= France at the 2022 Mediterranean Games =

- IOC code: FRA
- NOC: French Olympic Committee

in Oran, Algeria 25 June 2022 – 6 July 2022
- Medals Ranked 3rd: Gold 21 Silver 24 Bronze 36 Total 81

Mediterranean Games appearances (overview)
- 1951; 1955; 1959; 1963; 1967; 1971; 1975; 1979; 1983; 1987; 1991; 1993; 1997; 2001; 2005; 2009; 2013; 2018; 2022; 2026

France competed at the 2022 Mediterranean Games held in Oran, Algeria from 25 June to 6 July 2022.

France won a total of 81 medals during the Games. In terms of total medal count and gold medal count, France finished third behind Italy and Turkey.

== Medalists ==
The first French gold medals were won on the fourth day of competition.

Medal	Name	Sport	Event	Date
Gold	Pauline Lecarpentier	Wrestling	Women's freestyle 68 kg	29 June
Gold	Mélanie Vieu	Judo	Women's 48 kg	29 June
Gold	Iban Bariteaud; Nicolas Bernardi; Romain Fichet	Archery	Men's team	1 July
Gold	Sébastien Belay	Boules	Lyonnaise, Men's precision shooting	
Gold	Alexandre Chirat	Boules	Lyonnaise, Men's progressive shooting	
Gold	Lucas Desport; Yohan Cousin	Boules	Pétanque, Men's doubles	
Gold	Arthur Bruyas; Léopold Delaunay; Marcus Gomis; Lorenzo Thirouard-Samson	Basketball	Men's tournament	3 July
Gold	Joris Bouchaut	Swimming	Men's 1500 metre freestyle	3 July
Gold	Men's team	Football	Men's tournament	4 July
Gold	Jean-Baptiste Bernaz	Sailing	Laser	
Gold	Marie Barrué	Sailing	Laser Radial	
Gold	Hélène Noesmoen	Sailing	Women's iQFOiL	
Gold	Paul Penhoët	Cycling	Men's road race	
Gold	Azeddine Habz	Athletics	Men's 1500 metres	
Gold	Augustin Bey	Athletics	Men's long jump	
Gold	Aurore Fleury	Athletics	Women's 1500 metres	
Gold	Solenn Compper	Athletics	Women's 100 metres hurdles	
Gold	Océanne Muller	Shooting	Women's 10 metre air rifle	
Gold	Carole Cormenier	Shooting	Women's trap	
Gold	Océanne Muller; Brian Baudouin	Shooting	Mixed 10 metre air rifle team	
Gold	Noémie Battault; Emmanuel Petit	Shooting	Mixed skeet team	
Silver	Lorette Charpy; Carolann Héduit; Djenna Laroui; Morgane Osyssek-Reimer; Célia Serber	Gymnastics	Women's artistic team all-around	26 June
Silver	Léo Tudezca	Wrestling	Men's Greco-Roman 60 kg	27 June
Silver	Morgane Osyssek-Reimer	Gymnastics	Women's vault	29 June
Silver	Julie Sabatié	Wrestling	Women's freestyle 50 kg	29 June
Silver	Améline Douarre	Wrestling	Women's freestyle 62 kg	29 June
Silver	Chloé Buttigieg	Judo	Women's 78 kg	1 July
Silver	Enzo Grau	Boxing	Men's lightweight	1 July
Silver	Romane Moulai	Boxing	Women's light flyweight	1 July
Silver	Antoine Marc	Swimming	Men's 200 metre breaststroke	1 July
Silver	Camille Droguet; Anna Ngo Ndjock; Marie Pardon; Emma Peytour	Basketball	Women's tournament	3 July
Silver	Joris Bouchaut	Swimming	Men's 400 metre freestyle	3 July
Silver	Mathys Chouchaoui; Clément Bidard; Stanislas Huille; Charles Rihoux; Christophe Brun; Sergueï Comte	Swimming	Men's 4 × 100 metre medley relay	4 July
Silver	Assia Touati; Lucile Tessariol; Marina Jehl; Océane Carnez	Swimming	Women's 4 × 100 metre freestyle relay	5 July
Silver	Tom Arnoux	Sailing	Men's iQFOiL	
Silver	Ewen Costiou	Cycling	Men's road race	
Silver	Enzo Paleni	Cycling	Men's time trial	
Silver	Ludvy Vaillant	Athletics	Men's 400 metres hurdles	
Silver	Benjamin Choquert	Athletics	Men's half marathon	
Silver	Anthony Ammirati	Athletics	Men's pole vault	
Silver	Camille Seri	Athletics	Women's 400 metres hurdles	
Silver	Mallory Leconte; Éloïse de la Taille; Gémima Joseph; Wided Atatou	Athletics	Women's 4 × 100 metres relay	
Silver	Morgane Patru	Fencing	Women's foil	
Silver	Camille Jedrzejewski	Shooting	Women's 10 metre air pistol	
Silver	Camille Jedrzejewski; Florian Fouquet	Shooting	Mixed 10 metre air pistol team	
Bronze	Cameron-Lie Bernard; Edgar Boulet; Mathias Philippe; Léo Saladino; Julien Saleur	Gymnastics	Men's artistic team all-around	26 June
Bronze	Cameron-Lie Bernard	Gymnastics	Men's parallel bars	29 June
Bronze	Rayyan Meziane	Karate	Men's 60 kg	26 June
Bronze	Gagik Snjoyan	Wrestling	Men's Greco-Roman 67 kg	27 June
Bronze	Carolann Héduit	Gymnastics	Women's artistic individual all-around	28 June
Bronze	Akhmed Aibuev	Wrestling	Men's freestyle 86 kg	28 June
Bronze	Carolann Héduit	Gymnastics	Women's balance beam	29 June
Bronze	Morgane Osyssek-Reimer	Gymnastics	Women's floor	29 June
Bronze	Tatiana Salah	Wrestling	Women's freestyle 57 kg	29 June
Bronze	Maxime Gobert	Judo	Men's 66 kg	29 June
Bronze	Chloé Devictor	Judo	Women's 52 kg	29 June
Bronze	Kendra Dacher	Wrestling	Women's freestyle 76 kg	29 June
Bronze	Tizie Gnamien	Judo	Men's 81 kg	30 June
Bronze	Joris Agbegnenou	Judo	Men's 100 kg	1 July
Bronze	Anaëlle Florent	Archery	Women's individual	1 July
Bronze	Anaëlle Florent; Lucie Maunier; Lauréna Villard	Archery	Women's team	1 July
Bronze	Coralie Hayme	Judo	Women's +78 kg	1 July
Bronze	Moreno Fendero	Boxing	Men's middleweight	1 July
Bronze	Soheb Bouafia	Boxing	Men's heavyweight	1 July
Bronze	Djamili Dine Aboudou	Boxing	Men's super heavyweight	1 July
Bronze	Amina Zidani	Boxing	Women's lightweight	1 July
Bronze	Thaïs Larché	Boxing	Women's light welterweight	1 July
Bronze	Stanislas Huille	Swimming	Men's 100 metre backstroke	1 July
Bronze	Christophe Brun	Swimming	Men's 200 metre backstroke	1 July
Bronze	Charles Rihoux; Mathias Even; Tom Hug-Dreyfus; Arthur Berol	Swimming	Men's 4 × 100 metre freestyle relay	3 July
Bronze	Brandon Vautard	Weightlifting	Men's 89 kg Clean & Jerk	3 July
Bronze	Kanélya Carabin	Taekwondo	Women's 57 kg	3 July
Bronze	Magda Wiet-Hénin	Taekwondo	Women's 67 kg	4 July
Bronze	Althéa Laurin	Taekwondo	Women's +67 kg	4 July
Bronze	Valentin Retailleau	Cycling	Men's road race	
Bronze	Cédrine Kerbaol	Cycling	Women's time trial	
Bronze	Jerry Leconte; Jérémy Leroux; Yanis Ammour; Dylan Vermont	Athletics	Men's 4 × 100 metres relay	
Bronze	Felise Vahai Sosaia	Athletics	Men's javelin throw	
Bronze	Leila Hadji	Athletics	Women's 5000 metres	
Bronze	Alizée Minard	Athletics	Women's javelin throw	
Bronze	Éloïse Vanryssel	Fencing	Women's épée	

== Archery ==
France won three medals in archery.

Men

Athlete	Event	Ranking round		Round of 64	Round of 32	Round of 16	Quarterfinals	Semifinals	Final / BM	
Athlete	Event	Score	Seed	Opposition Score	Opposition Score	Opposition Score	Opposition Score	Opposition Score	Opposition Score	Rank
Romain Fichet	Individual	649	7	Bye	Podkrajšek (SLO); W 6-0	Castro (ESP); W 6-4	Nespoli (ITA); L 1-7	Did not advance		
Nicolas Bernardi	Individual	639	12	Bye	Panagi (CYP); W 6-0	Ak (TUR); W 6-4	Carneiro (POR); W 7-1	Mete Gazoz (TUR); L 0-6	Mauro Nespoli (ITA); L 3-7	4
Iban Bariteaud	Individual	632	15	Bye	Dvorani (KOS); W 6-4	Nespoli (ITA); L 3-7	Did not advance			
Fichet; Bernardi; Bariteaud	Team	1920	4	—N/a		Bye	Slovenia; W w/o	Italy; W 6-0	Spain; W 6-2	1st place, gold medalist(s)

Women

Athlete	Event	Ranking round		Round of 32	Round of 16	Quarterfinals	Semifinals	Final / BM	
Athlete	Event	Score	Seed	Opposition Score	Opposition Score	Opposition Score	Opposition Score	Opposition Score	Rank
Lauréna Villard	Individual	627	13	Unamunzaga (ESP); W 6^{10+}-5^{10+}	Canales (ESP); L 4-6	Did not advance			
Anaëlle Florent	Individual	624	14	Corel (SLO); W w/o	Umer (SLO); W w/o	Coşkun (TUR); W 7-3	Lucilla Boari (ITA); L 0-6	Ezgi Başaran (TUR); W 7-3	3rd place, bronze medalist(s)
Lucie Maunier	Individual	614	16	Petrou (CYP); W 7-1	Anagöz (TUR); L 0-6	Did not advance			
Villard; Florent; Maunier	Team	1865	5	—N/a		Spain; W 5-4	Turkey; L 1-5	Greece; W 6-2	3rd place, bronze medalist(s)

Mixed

Athlete	Event	Ranking round		Round of 16	Quarterfinals	Semifinals	Final / BM	
Athlete	Event	Score	Seed	Opposition Score	Opposition Score	Opposition Score	Opposition Score	Rank
Villard; Fichet	Mixed team	1276	5	Baayou (LBA); Aborgiba (LBA); W 6-2	Canales (ESP); Alvariño (ESP); L 4-5	Did not advance		

== Artistic gymnastics ==
France competed in artistic gymnastics.

== Athletics ==
France won 13 medals in athletics.

== Basketball ==
France won the gold medal in the men's tournament and the silver medal in the women's tournament.

Athlete	Event	Group matches				Quarterfinals	Semifinals	Final / BM	
Athlete	Event	Opposition Score	Opposition Score	Opposition Score	Rank	Opposition Score	Opposition Score	Opposition Score	Rank
Arthur Bruyas; Léopold Delaunay; Marcus Gomis; Lorenzo Thirouard-Samson	Men's Tournament	(Serbia) Serbia; L 19–21	(Cyprus) Cyprus; W 20–3	-	2	(Greece) Greece; W 22–20	(Turkey) Turkey; W 15–12	(Serbia) Serbia; W 19–13	1st place, gold medalist(s)
Camille Droguet; Anna Ngo Ndjock; Marie Pardon; Emma Peytour	Women's Tournament	(Tunisia) Tunisia; W 21–2	(Egypt) Egypt; W 16–10	(Italy) Italy; W 13–9	1	(Slovenia) Slovenia; W 20–5	(Turkey) Turkey; W 19–10	(Spain) Spain; L 11–12	2nd place, silver medalist(s)

== Boules ==
France won three gold medals in boules.

== Boxing ==
France won seven medals in boxing.

Men

Athlete	Event	Round of 16	Quarterfinals	Semifinals	Final / BM	
Athlete	Event	Opposition Score	Opposition Score	Opposition Score	Opposition Score	Rank
Ibrahim Boukedim	flyweight	Haris Aganović (BIH); W RSC	Said Mortaji (MAR); L 1-2	Did not advance		
Enzo Grau	lightweight	Bye	Tadej Černoga (SLO); W 3-0	Abdelnacer Benlaribi (ALG); L 2-1	Mohamed Hamout (MAR); L 0-3	2nd place, silver medalist(s)
Hugo Grau	welterweight	Omar Elsayed (EGY); L 0-2	Did not advance			
Moreno Fendero	middleweight	Arjon Kajoshi (ALB); W 3-0	Aly Abdalla (EGY); W 3-0	Ahmad Ghousoon (SYR); L 0-3	Did not advance	3rd place, bronze medalist(s)
Cheikhmar Koné	light heavyweight	Mohamed Assaghir (MAR); L 0-3	Did not advance			
Soheb Bouafia	heavyweight	Burak Aksın (TUR); W 3-0	Džemal Bošnjak (BIH); W 2-0	Moh Said Hamani (ALG); L 0-3	Did not advance	3rd place, bronze medalist(s)
Djamili Dine Aboudou	super heavyweight	-	Mohammad Mlaiyes (SYR); W 3-0	Vincenzo Fiaschetti (ITA); L 0-3	Did not advance	3rd place, bronze medalist(s)

Women

Athlete	Event	Round of 16	Quarterfinals	Semifinals	Final / BM	
Athlete	Event	Opposition Score	Opposition Score	Opposition Score	Opposition Score	Rank
Romane Moulai	flyweight	-	bye	Buse Naz Çakıroğlu (TUR); W W/O	Giordana Sorrentino (ITA); L 0-3	2nd place, silver medalist(s)
Salma Friga	bantamweight	Widad Bertal (MAR); L 0-3	Did not advance			
Amina Zidani	lightweight	-	Mariam Hussein (EGY); W ABD	Hadjila Khelif (ALG); L 0-3	Did not advance	2nd place, silver medalist(s)
Thaïs Larché	light welterweight	-	Tara Bohatjuk (BIH); W 3-0	Assunta Canfora (ITA); L 0-3	Did not advance	3rd place, bronze medalist(s)
Fatia Benmessahel	welterweight	-	Oumaïma Belahbib (MAR); L 1-2	Did not advance		

== Cycling ==
France competed in cycling.

== Fencing ==
France won two medals in fencing.

== Football ==
France won the football tournament.

Summary

Team	Event	Group stage				Semifinal	Final / BM	
Team	Event	Opposition Score	Opposition Score	Opposition Score	Rank	Opposition Score	Opposition Score	Rank
France U18 men's	Men's tournament	Morocco; W 1–0	Spain; D 1–1	Algeria; W 3–2	1	Turkey; W 2–0	Italy; W 1–0	1st place, gold medalist(s)

Group play

Pos	Team	Pld	W	D	L	GF	GA	GD	Pts	Qualification
1	France	3	2	1	0	5	3	+2	7	Semifinals
2	Morocco	3	1	1	1	3	2	+1	4	Semifinals
3	Algeria (H)	3	1	0	2	3	5	−2	3	
4	Spain	3	0	2	1	2	3	−1	2	

Source: Oran 2022
(H) Hosts
26 June 2022
20:00

France	1–0	Morocco
Messoussa 15'	Report

Abdelkrim Kerroum Stadium, Sig
Referee: Luca Pairetto (Italy)

28 June 2022
20:00

Spain	1–1	France
Gómez 47'	Report	Dimi 55'

Ahmed Zabana Stadium, Oran
Referee: Zorbay Küçük (Turkey)

30 June 2022
20:00

Algeria	2–3	France
Chegra 56' (pen.); Zaoui 79'	Report	Messoussa 8', 28'; Bouanani 81' (pen.)

Ahmed Zabana Stadium, Oran
Attendance: 40,000
Referee: Luca Pairetto (Italy)

Semifinal

2 July 2022
17:00

France	2–0	Turkey
Messoussa 10'; Dimi 84'	Report

Abdelkrim Kerroum Stadium, Sig
Referee: Youcef Gamouh (Algeria)

Gold medal match

4 July 2022
20:45

France	1–0	Italy
Pirringuel 68'	Report

Miloud Hadefi Stadium, Bir El Djir
Attendance: 25,000 (official)
45,000
Referee: Lotfi Bekouassa (Algeria)

== Judo ==
France won seven medals in judo.

== Karate ==
France won one medal in karate: Rayyan Meziane won bronze in the men's 60 kg event.

Men

Athlete	Event	Round of 16	Quarterfinals	Semifinals	Repechage	Final / BM	
Athlete	Event	Opposition Result	Opposition Result	Opposition Result	Opposition Result	Opposition Result	Rank
Rayyan Meziane	−60 kg	Bye	Salmi (ALG); L 1–2	—N/a	Marinić (SLO); W 1–0	Crescenzo (ITA); W 2–0	3rd place, bronze medalist(s)
Younesse Salmi	−67 kg	Bye	Maresca (ITA); L 1–5	—N/a	—N/a	Tsangaras (CYP); L 4–5	5
Thanh-Liêm Lê	−75 kg	Bouallagui (TUN); W 4–1	Garibović (CRO); L 1–1	—N/a	—N/a	—N/a	7
Dany Makamata	−84 kg	Gashi (KOS); W 3–0	Brežančić (SRB); L 1–1	—N/a	Midoune (ALG); L 0–8	—N/a	7
Hendrick Confiac	+84 kg	Abdulsalam (LBA); W 8–2	Džuho (BIH); L 1–4	—N/a	—N/a	—N/a	7

Women

Athlete	Event	Round of 16	Quarterfinals	Semifinals	Repechage	Final / BM	
Athlete	Event	Opposition Result	Opposition Result	Opposition Result	Opposition Result	Opposition Result	Rank
Tiphaine Bonnarde	−50 kg	Haberl (SLO); L 0–0	—N/a	—N/a	—N/a	—N/a	10
Asma Charif	−55 kg	Kostić (BIH); W 5–2	Gërvalla (KOS); L 0–3	—N/a	—N/a	—N/a	7
Maeva Dario	−61 kg	Gözütok (BIH); W 4–4	El-Shafei (EGY); W 5–3	Mahjoub (TUN); L 1–8	—N/a	Sipović (BIH); L 1–2	5
Natanaële Flamand	−68 kg	Mekkaoui (ALG); W 4–1	Eltemur (TUR); L 3–4	—N/a	—N/a	—N/a	7
Tricya Sombe	+68 kg	Bye	Crivelli (ITA); L 0–8	—N/a	—N/a	—N/a	7

== Sailing ==
France won four medals in sailing.

== Shooting ==
France won six medals in shooting.

== Swimming ==
France won eight medals in swimming.

== Taekwondo ==
France won three medals in Taekwondo.

Legend

- PTG — Won by Points Gap
- SUP — Won by superiority
- OT — Won on over time (Golden Point)
- DQ — Won by disqualification
- PUN — Won by punitive declaration
- WD — Won by withdrawal

Men

Athlete	Event	Round of 32	Round of 16	Quarterfinals	Semifinals	Final	Rank
Herwan Onanga	58 kg	—N/a	Foti (ITA); W 19-17	Lakehal (MAR); L 5-29^{PTG}	—N/a	—N/a	5
Souleyman Alaphilippe	68 kg	Tebib (ALG); W 27-22	Pérez (ESP); L 6-22	—N/a	—N/a	—N/a	9
Ismaël Bouzid Souhli	80 kg	—N/a	Boatris (MAR); L 31-33	—N/a	—N/a	—N/a	9

Women

Athlete	Event	Round of 16	Quarterfinals	Semifinals	Final	Rank
Kanélya Carabin	57 kg	Bye	Kalteki (GRE); W 14-12	Darwish (EGY); L 13-21	—N/a	3rd place, bronze medalist(s)
Magda Wiet-Hénin	67 kg	Bye	Salih (MAR); W 21-1^{PTG}	Castro (ESP); L 15-19	—N/a	3rd place, bronze medalist(s)
Althéa Laurin	+67 kg	Bye	Božanić (SRB); W 5-24	Aboufaras (MAR); L 6-9	—N/a	3rd place, bronze medalist(s)

== Volleyball ==
France competed in volleyball.

=== Women's tournament ===
Group A

Pos	Team	Pld	W	L	Pts	SW	SL	SR	SPW	SPL	SPR	Qualification
1	Serbia	2	2	0	5	6	3	2.000	192	187	1.027	Final round
2	Croatia	2	1	1	3	5	5	1.000	209	200	1.045	Final round
3	France	2	0	2	1	3	6	0.500	186	200	0.930	

== Water polo ==
Summary

Team	Event	Group stage					Semifinal	Final / BM / Pl.	
Team	Event	Opposition Score	Opposition Score	Opposition Score	Opposition Score	Rank	Opposition Score	Opposition Score	Rank
France men's	Men's tournament	Montenegro; L 8–16	Portugal; W 15–10	Serbia; L 7–18	Slovenia; L 7–11	4	Did not advance	Turkey; W 11–10	7

Group play

Pos	Team	Pld	W	D	L	GF	GA	GD	Pts	Qualification
1	Serbia	4	4	0	0	65	24	+41	8	Semifinals
2	Montenegro	4	3	0	1	58	27	+31	6	Semifinals
3	Slovenia	4	2	0	2	41	45	−4	4	Fifth place game
4	France	4	1	0	3	37	55	−18	2	Seventh place game
5	Portugal	4	0	0	4	22	72	−50	0	

Source: Oran 2022

24 June 2022; 12:00	Report	France	8–16	Montenegro	Oran; Referees: Grigorios Spanoudis (GRE), Sergio Jiménez (ESP)
24 June 2022; 12:00	Report	Score by quarters: 2–4, 2–4, 1–4, 3–4			Oran; Referees: Grigorios Spanoudis (GRE), Sergio Jiménez (ESP)
24 June 2022; 12:00	Report	Mas, Rodrigues 4	Goals	L. Vukičević 5	Oran; Referees: Grigorios Spanoudis (GRE), Sergio Jiménez (ESP)

25 June 2022; 10:00	Report	Portugal	10–15	France	Oran; Referees: Grigorios Spanoudis (GRE), Emanuel Manol Taylan (TUR)
25 June 2022; 10:00	Report	Score by quarters: 2–2, 1–4, 3–4, 4–5			Oran; Referees: Grigorios Spanoudis (GRE), Emanuel Manol Taylan (TUR)
25 June 2022; 10:00	Report	Moreira 3	Goals	Mas 5	Oran; Referees: Grigorios Spanoudis (GRE), Emanuel Manol Taylan (TUR)

26 June 2022; 10:00	Report	France	7–18	Serbia	Oran; Referees: Emanuel Manol Taylan (TUR), Grigorios Spanoudis (GRE)
26 June 2022; 10:00	Report	Score by quarters: 2–4, 1–8, 3–2, 1–4			Oran; Referees: Emanuel Manol Taylan (TUR), Grigorios Spanoudis (GRE)
26 June 2022; 10:00	Report	Mathieu 3	Goals	Kojić 6	Oran; Referees: Emanuel Manol Taylan (TUR), Grigorios Spanoudis (GRE)

27 June 2022; 12:00	Report	Slovenia	11–7	France	Oran; Referees: Andrija Đurašković (MNE), Arnaldo Petronilli (ITA)
27 June 2022; 12:00	Report	Score by quarters: 3–1, 1–2, 4–1, 3–3			Oran; Referees: Andrija Đurašković (MNE), Arnaldo Petronilli (ITA)
27 June 2022; 12:00	Report	Zdravkovič Gligorovski 3	Goals	Roussel 2	Oran; Referees: Andrija Đurašković (MNE), Arnaldo Petronilli (ITA)

Seventh place game

29 June 2022; 10:00	Report	Turkey	10–11	France	Oran; Referees: Andrija Đurašković (MNE), Matevž Homovec (SLO)
29 June 2022; 10:00	Report	Score by quarters: 1–1, 1–3, 4–3, 4–4			Oran; Referees: Andrija Đurašković (MNE), Matevž Homovec (SLO)
29 June 2022; 10:00	Report	Caner 5	Goals	Mas 3	Oran; Referees: Andrija Đurašković (MNE), Matevž Homovec (SLO)

== Weightlifting ==
France won one medal in weightlifting.

Men

Athlete	Event	Snatch		Clean & Jerk	
Athlete	Event	Result	Rank	Result	Rank
Bernardin Matam	73 kg	DNS			
Brandon Vautard	89 kg	140	9	192	3rd place, bronze medalist(s)
Romain Imadouchène	102 kg	160	6	—	—

Women

Athlete	Event	Snatch		Clean & Jerk	
Athlete	Event	Result	Rank	Result	Rank
Garance Rigaud	59 kg	82	7	95	8
Dora Tchakounté	71 kg	97	4	114	8
Vicky Graillot	71 kg	88	9	114	9

== Wrestling ==
France won eight medals in wrestling.
