= Swimming at the 2022 Mediterranean Games – Men's 200 metre breaststroke =

Men's 200 metre breaststroke at the 2022 Mediterranean Games
- Location: Bir El Djir, Algeria
- Dates: 1 July
- Competitors: 15 from 9 nations
- Winning time: 2:11.26

Medalists
gold medal	Berkay Ömer Öğretir	Turkey
silver medal	Antoine Marc	France
bronze medal	Alex Castejón	Spain

The men's 200 metre breaststroke competition at the 2022 Mediterranean Games was held on 1 July 2022 at the Aquatic Center of the Olympic Complex in Bir El Djir.

== Records ==
Prior to this competition, the existing world and Mediterranean Games records were as follows:

World record	Zac Stubblety-Cook (AUS)	2:05.95	Adelaide, Australia	19 May 2022
Mediterranean Games record	Melquíades Álvarez (ESP)	2:09.69	Pescara, Italy	29 June 2009

== Results ==
=== Heats ===
The heats were started at 10:39.

Rank	Heat	Lane	Name	Nationality	Time	Notes
1	3	4	Berkay Ömer Öğretir	Turkey	2:12.62	Q
2	3	5	Alex Castejón	Spain	2:12.73	Q
3	2	5	Antoine Marc	France	2:14.94	Q
4	1	6	Gabriel Lopes	Portugal	2:15.24	Q
5	2	4	Savvas Thomoglou	Greece	2:15.87	Q
6	1	4	Alessandro Fusco	Italy	2:16.22	Q
7	1	5	Thomas Le Pape	France	2:16.25	Q
8	2	3	Giovanni Sorriso	Italy	2:16.58	Q
9	1	2	Francisco Quintas	Portugal	2:17.19	
10	1	3	Ramzi Chouchar	Algeria	2:17.61	
11	2	6	Moncef Aymen Balamane	Algeria	2:20.03	
12	3	2	Giacomo Casadei	San Marino	2:20.31	
13	3	3	Konstantinos Meretsolias	Greece	2:20.38	
14	2	2	Andrej Stojanovski	North Macedonia	2:22.42	
15	3	6	Kaan Korkmaz	Turkey	2:22.80	
	2	7	Siraj Al-Sharif	Libya	Did not start	
	3	7	Abdulhay Ashour	Libya	Did not start	

=== Final ===
The final was held at 18:35.

Rank	Lane	Name	Nationality	Time	Notes
1st place, gold medalist(s)	4	Berkay Ömer Öğretir	Turkey	2:11.26	
2nd place, silver medalist(s)	3	Antoine Marc	France	2:12.55	
3rd place, bronze medalist(s)	5	Alex Castejón	Spain	2:12.60	
4	2	Savvas Thomoglou	Greece	2:13.28	
5	6	Gabriel Lopes	Portugal	2:13.64	
6	7	Alessandro Fusco	Italy	2:15.38	
7	1	Thomas Le Pape	France	2:15.50	
8	8	Giovanni Sorriso	Italy	2:15.90	
