= Swimming at the 2022 Mediterranean Games – Women's 50 metre backstroke =

Women's 50 metre backstroke at the 2022 Mediterranean Games
- Location: Bir El Djir, Algeria
- Dates: 3 July
- Competitors: 15 from 9 nations
- Winning time: 28.59

Medalists
gold medal	Nina Stanisavljević	Serbia
silver medal	Anna Ntountounaki	Greece
bronze medal	Rafaela Azevedo	Portugal

The women's 50 metre backstroke competition at the 2022 Mediterranean Games was held on 3 July 2022 at the Aquatic Center of the Olympic Complex in Bir El Djir.

== Records ==
Prior to this competition, the existing world and Mediterranean Games records were as follows:

World record	Liu Xiang (CHN)	26.98	Jakarta, Indonesia	21 August 2018
Mediterranean Games record	Silvia Scalia (ITA)	28.33	Tarragona, Spain	23 June 2018

== Results ==
=== Heats ===
The heats were started at 10:42.

Rank	Heat	Lane	Name	Nationality	Time	Notes
1	2	3	Nina Stanisavljević	Serbia	28.60	Q
2	1	3	Ekaterina Avramova	Turkey	28.83	Q
3	2	4	Anita Gastaldi	Italy	29.00	Q
4	2	7	Anna Ntountounaki	Greece	29.04	Q
5	1	4	Rafaela Azevedo	Portugal	29.09	Q
6	1	2	Carlotta Zofkova	Italy	29.18	Q
7	1	6	Sezin Eligül	Turkey	29.21	Q
7	2	5	Carmen Weiler	Spain	29.21	Q
9	1	5	Lidón Muñoz	Spain	29.24	
10	2	6	Camila Rebelo	Portugal	29.29	
11	2	1	Amel Melih	Algeria	29.67	
12	2	2	Emma Morel	France	29.96	
13	1	7	Ioanna Sacha	Greece	30.00	
14	2	8	Mònica Ramírez	Andorra	30.99	
15	1	1	Imène Kawthar Zitouni	Algeria	31.03	

=== Final ===
The final was held at 18:06.

Rank	Lane	Name	Nationality	Time	Notes
1st place, gold medalist(s)	4	Nina Stanisavljević	Serbia	28.59	
2nd place, silver medalist(s)	6	Anna Ntountounaki	Greece	28.68	
3rd place, bronze medalist(s)	2	Rafaela Azevedo	Portugal	28.86	
4	5	Ekaterina Avramova	Turkey	28.89	
5	7	Carlotta Zofkova	Italy	29.06	
6	3	Anita Gastaldi	Italy	29.17	
7	1	Carmen Weiler	Spain	29.27	
8	8	Sezin Eligül	Turkey	29.37	
