= Swimming at the 2022 Mediterranean Games – Men's 50 metre freestyle =

Men's 50 metre freestyle at the 2022 Mediterranean Games
- Location: Bir El Djir, Algeria
- Dates: 4 July
- Competitors: 20 from 11 nations
- Winning time: 21.91

Medalists
gold medal	Kristian Gkolomeev	Greece
silver medal	Miguel Nascimento	Portugal
bronze medal	Oussama Sahnoune	Algeria

The men's 50 metre freestyle competition at the 2022 Mediterranean Games was held on 4 July 2022 at the Aquatic Center of the Olympic Complex in Bir El Djir.

== Records ==
Prior to this competition, the existing world and Mediterranean Games records were as follows:

World record	César Cielo (BRA)	20.91	São Paulo, Brazil	18 December 2009
Mediterranean Games record	Frédérick Bousquet (FRA)	21.17	Pescara, Italy	28 June 2009

== Results ==
=== Heats ===
The heats were started at 10:10.

Rank	Heat	Lane	Name	Nationality	Time	Notes
1	3	4	Kristian Gkolomeev	Greece	22.05	Q
2	1	5	Oussama Sahnoune	Algeria	22.13	Q
3	1	4	Diogo Ribeiro	Portugal	22.52	Q
4	2	4	Miguel Nascimento	Portugal	22.55	Q
5	1	6	Stergios Bilas	Greece	22.62	Q
6	3	3	Alessandro Bori	Italy	22.63	Q
7	2	3	Emre Sakçı	Turkey	22.65	Q
8	1	3	Julien Berol	France	22.68	Q
9	2	5	Nicolò Franceschi	Italy	22.69	
10	2	2	Mathias Even	France	22.70	
10	1	2	Emre Gürdenli	Turkey	22.70	
12	3	5	Nikola Aćin	Serbia	22.73	
13	2	6	Uroš Nikolić	Serbia	22.80	
14	3	6	Juan Segura	Spain	22.91	
15	3	2	Mario Mollà	Spain	23.39	
16	3	7	Mehdi Nazim Benbara	Algeria	23.46	
17	2	7	Markos Iakovidis	Cyprus	23.80	
18	2	1	Tomàs Lomero	Andorra	23.83	
19	1	7	Andreas Pantziaros	Cyprus	24.88	
20	3	1	Drini Ujkashej	Albania	27.11	

=== Final ===
The final was held at 18:03.

Rank	Lane	Name	Nationality	Time	Notes
1st place, gold medalist(s)	4	Kristian Gkolomeev	Greece	21.91	
2nd place, silver medalist(s)	6	Miguel Nascimento	Portugal	22.01	
3rd place, bronze medalist(s)	5	Oussama Sahnoune	Algeria	22.22	
4	1	Emre Sakçı	Turkey	22.37	
5	3	Diogo Ribeiro	Portugal	22.40	
6	7	Alessandro Bori	Italy	22.50	
7	8	Julien Berol	France	22.65	
8	2	Stergios Bilas	Greece	22.75	
