= Archery at the 2022 Mediterranean Games – Women's team =

Women's team at the 2022 Mediterranean Games
- Venue: Annex Stadium Olympic Complex
- Date: 29 June – 1 July
- Competitors: 21 from 7 nations
- Teams: 7

Medalists
gold medal	Yasemin Anagöz; Ezgi Başaran; Gülnaz Büşranur Coşkun	Turkey
silver medal	Tatiana Andreoli; Lucilla Boari; Chiara Rebagliati	Italy
bronze medal	Anaëlle Florent; Lucie Maunier; Lauréna Villard	France

The women's team competition in archery at the 2022 Mediterranean Games was held from 29 June to 1 July at the Annex Stadium of the Olympic Complex in Oran.

== Qualification round ==
Results after 216 arrows.

Rank	Nation	Name	Score	10+X	X
1	Turkey	Yasemin Anagöz; Ezgi Başaran; Gülnaz Büşranur Coşkun	1928	71	18
2	Italy	Tatiana Andreoli; Lucilla Boari; Chiara Rebagliati	1900	56	17
3	Greece	Anatoli Martha Gkorila; Maria Nasoula; Evangelia Psarra	1890	51	18
4	Spain	Elia Canales; Leyre Fernández; Irati Unamunzaga	1873	45	16
5	France	Anaëlle Florent; Lucie Maunier; Lauréna Villard	1865	46	14
6	Slovenia	Urška Čavič; Nina Corel; Ana Umer	1847	48	17
7	Cyprus	Christina Hadjierotocritou; Mikaella Kourouna; Elena Petrou	1781	31	6

== Elimination round ==
Quarterfinals
5	France	5	52	50	54	45	24+
4	Spain	4	50	51	53	54	24
3	Greece	w/o
6	Slovenia
7	Cyprus	0	41	38	46
2	Italy	6	45	51	49

Semifinals
1	Turkey	5	53	51	56
5	France	1	53	50	50
3	Greece	0	45	46	51
2	Italy	6	50	51	53

Final
1	Turkey	5	50	51	55	54
2	Italy	3	49	53	53	54
Third place
5	France	6	48	54	54	51
3	Greece	2	51	52	53	48
