= Judo at the 2022 Mediterranean Games – Men's 81 kg =

Judo competitions

Judo Men's 81 kg at the 2022 Mediterranean Games
- Venue: Mohammed Ben Ahmed Convention Centre – Hall 03 and 06
- Location: Oran, Algeria
- Date: 30 June
- Competitors: 11 from 11 nations

Medalists
gold medal	Vedat Albayrak	Turkey
silver medal	Kenny Komi Bedel	Italy
bronze medal	Alfonso Urquiza	Spain
bronze medal	Tizie Gnamien	France

The men's 81 kg competition in judo at the 2022 Mediterranean Games was held on 30 June at the Mohammed Ben Ahmed Convention Centre in Oran.

== Results ==
=== Main bracket ===
Round of 16
Božidar Vučurević (BIH)	10
Edi Šerifovski (MKD)	00
Manuel Rodrigues (POR)	00
Kenny Komi Bedel (ITA)	10
Aghiles Imad Benazoug (ALG)	10
Arber Kullashi (KOS)	00

Quarterfinals
Vedat Albayrak (TUR)	01
Božidar Vučurević (BIH)	00
Tizie Gnamien (FRA)	01
Wajdi Hajji (TUN)	00
Achraf Moutii (MAR)	00
Kenny Komi Bedel (ITA)	10
Alfonso Urquiza (ESP)	10
Aghiles Imad Benazoug (ALG)	00

Semifinals
Vedat Albayrak (TUR)	10
Tizie Gnamien (FRA)	00
Kenny Komi Bedel (ITA)	10
Alfonso Urquiza (ESP)	00

Final
Vedat Albayrak (TUR)	01
Kenny Komi Bedel (ITA)	00

=== Repechage ===
Repechage 2
Božidar Vučurević (BIH)	10
Wajdi Hajji (TUN)	00

Bronze medal
Božidar Vučurević (BIH)	00
Alfonso Urquiza (ESP)	01

Repechage 1
Manuel Rodrigues (POR)	11
Achraf Moutii (MAR)	00

Repechage 2
Manuel Rodrigues (POR)	01
Aghiles Imad Benazoug (ALG)	00

Bronze medal
Manuel Rodrigues (POR)	00
Tizie Gnamien (FRA)	11
