= Judo at the 2022 Mediterranean Games – Women's 48 kg =

Judo competitions

Judo Women's 48 kg at the 2022 Mediterranean Games
- Venue: Mohammed Ben Ahmed Convention Centre – Hall 03 and 06
- Location: Oran, Algeria
- Date: 29 June
- Competitors: 11 from 11 nations

Medalists
gold medal	Mélanie Vieu	France
silver medal	Milica Nikolić	Serbia
bronze medal	Maruša Štangar	Slovenia
bronze medal	Oumaima Bedioui	Tunisia

The women's 48 kg competition in judo at the 2022 Mediterranean Games was held on 29 June at the Mohammed Ben Ahmed Convention Centre in Oran.

== Results ==
=== Main bracket ===
Round of 16
Chaimae Eddinari (MAR)	00
Raquel Brito (POR)	10
Imene Rezzoug (ALG)	00
Sofia Petitto (ITA)	10
Gülkader Şentürk (TUR)	00
Erza Muminoviq (KOS)	10

Quarterfinals
Milica Nikolić (SRB)	10
Raquel Brito (POR)	00
Mireia Lapuerta Comas (ESP)	10
Maruša Štangar (SLO)	00
Oumaima Bedioui (TUN)	00
Sofia Petitto (ITA)	10
Mélanie Vieu (FRA)	10
Erza Muminoviq (KOS)	00

Semifinals
Milica Nikolić (SRB)	10
Mireia Lapuerta Comas (ESP)	00
Sofia Petitto (ITA)	01
Mélanie Vieu (FRA)	10

Final
Milica Nikolić (SRB)	00
Mélanie Vieu (FRA)	01

=== Repechage ===
Repechage 2
Raquel Brito (POR)	00
Maruša Štangar (SLO)	10

Bronze medal
Maruša Štangar (SLO)	10
Sofia Petitto (ITA)	01

Repechage 1
Imene Rezzoug (ALG)	00
Oumaima Bedioui (TUN)	11

Repechage 2
Oumaima Bedioui (TUN)	10
Erza Muminoviq (KOS)	00

Bronze medal
Oumaima Bedioui (TUN)	01
Mireia Lapuerta Comas (ESP)	00
