= Archery at the 2022 Mediterranean Games – Women's individual =

Women's individual at the 2022 Mediterranean Games
- Venue: Annex Stadium Olympic Complex
- Date: 29 June – 1 July
- Competitors: 27 from 12 nations

Medalists
gold medal	Leyre Fernández	Spain
silver medal	Lucilla Boari	Italy
bronze medal	Anaëlle Florent	France

The women's individual competition in archery at the 2022 Mediterranean Games was held from 29 June to 1 July at the Annex Stadium of the Olympic Complex in Oran.

== Qualification round ==
Results after 72 arrows.

Rank	Name	Nation	Score	10+X	X
1	Yasemin Anagöz	Turkey	649	26	6
2	Anatoli Martha Gkorila	Greece	644	24	8
3	Ana Umer	Slovenia	643	20	7
4	Elia Canales	Spain	642	19	8
5	Ezgi Başaran	Turkey	641	27	7
6	Gülnaz Büşranur Coşkun	Turkey	638	18	5
7	Lucilla Boari	Italy	637	22	5
8	Leyre Fernández	Spain	635	18	5
9	Tatiana Andreoli	Italy	634	15	8
10	Maria Nasoula	Greece	630	17	7
11	Chiara Rebagliati	Italy	629	19	4
12	Rihab Elwalid	Tunisia	628	22	4
13	Lauréna Villard	France	627	15	3
14	Anaëlle Florent	France	624	18	6
15	Evangelia Psarra	Greece	616	10	3
16	Lucie Maunier	France	614	13	5
17	Elena Petrou	Cyprus	604	11	2
18	Urška Čavič	Slovenia	603	17	6
19	Nina Corel	Slovenia	601	11	4
20	Irati Unamunzaga	Spain	596	8	3
21	Christina Hadjierotocritou	Cyprus	594	11	3
22	Yasmine Bellal	Algeria	583	11	3
23	Mikaella Kourouna	Cyprus	583	9	1
24	Nada Azzam	Egypt	568	8	3
25	Anja Brkić	Serbia	545	5	2
26	Israa Yassen	Egypt	524	9	0
27	Maran Baayou	Libya	385	3	0

== Elimination round ==
=== Section 1 ===
1/16 finals
17	Petrou (CYP)	1	25	23	27	25
16	Maunier (FRA)	7	27	28	27	28
9	Andreoli (ITA)	6	26	28	28	27
24	Azzam (EGY)	2	27	25	24	23
25	Brkić (CRO)	1	26	24	21	25
8	Fernández (ESP)	7	26	27	27	27

1/8 finals
1	Anagöz (TUR)	6	29	29	28
16	Maunier (FRA)	0	27	25	27
9	Andreoli (ITA)	2	28	26	26	27
8	Fernández (ESP)	6	28	27	28	27

Quarterfinals
1	Anagöz (TUR)	1	26	26	25	27
8	Fernández (ESP)	7	29	26	27	29

=== Section 2 ===
1/16 finals
21	Hadjierotocritou (CYP)	6	25	27	26	27	25
12	Elwalid (TUN)	4	25	23	26	27	25
13	Villard (FRA)	6^{10+}	26	26	27	25	22
20	Unamunzaga (ESP)	5^{10}	24	28	24	27	22

1/8 finals
5	Başaran (TUR)	6	21	25	27	28
21	Hadjierotocritou (CYP)	2	19	25	27	27
13	Villard (FRA)	4	28	26	28	26	25
4	Canales (ESP)	6	26	27	27	27	27

Quarterfinals
5	Başaran (TUR)	6	29	25	28	28	29
4	Canales (ESP)	4	29	28	25	28	27

=== Section 3 ===
1/16 finals
19	Corel (SLO)
14	Florent (FRA)	w/o
11	Rebagliati (ITA)	6	28	26	24	26
22	Bellal (ALG)	2	26	22	26	20
27	Baayou (LBA)	0	20	21	22
6	Coşkun (TUR)	6	25	28	26

1/8 finals
3	Umer (SLO)
14	Florent (FRA)	w/o
11	Rebagliati (ITA)	0	23	24	26
6	Coşkun (TUR)	6	28	28	28

Quarterfinals
14	Florent (FRA)	7	28	27	25	25	29
6	Coşkun (TUR)	3	24	26	25	28	28

=== Section 4 ===
1/16 finals
7	Boari (ITA)	6	26	29	27
26	Yassen (EGY)	0	18	16	15
23	Kourouna (CYP)	6	27	25	27	27	27
10	Nasoula (GRE)	4	25	25	28	27	25
15	Psarra (GRE)	7	28	28	27	28
18	Čavič (SLO)	1	26	25	27	24

1/8 finals
7	Boari (ITA)	6	25	28	28	27
23	Kourouna (CYP)	2	26	25	27	25
15	Psarra (GRE)	6	21	26	27	28
2	Gkorila (GRE)	2	27	21	24	26

Quarterfinals
7	Boari (ITA)	6	26	28	24	24	29
15	Psarra (GRE)	4	27	27	19	27	26

=== Finals ===
Semifinals
8	Leyre Fernández (ESP)	6^{9}	27	26	26	24	25
5	Ezgi Başaran (TUR)	5^{8}	25	25	27	28	25
14	Anaëlle Florent (FRA)	0	21	24	26
7	Lucilla Boari (ITA)	6	28	30	27

Gold medal match
8	Leyre Fernández (ESP)	7	24	25	25	28
7	Lucilla Boari (ITA)	1	24	24	19	25
Bronze medal match
5	Ezgi Başaran (TUR)	3	23	22	25	27	21
14	Anaëlle Florent (FRA)	7	24	21	25	28	25
