= Karate at the 2022 Mediterranean Games – Men's 75 kg =

Held at the Mohammed ben Ahmed CCO in Oran

Men's kumite 75 kg at the 2022 Mediterranean Games
- Venue: Mohammed ben Ahmed CCO Hall 03 and 06
- Date: 26 June
- Competitors: 15 from 15 nations

Medalists
| gold medal | Oussama Zaid | Algeria |
| silver medal | Abdalla Abdelaziz | Egypt |
| bronze medal | Luigi Busà | Italy |
| bronze medal | Hamza Turulja | Bosnia and Herzegovina |

The men's 75 kg competition in karate at the 2022 Mediterranean Games was held on 26 June at the Mohammed ben Ahmed CCO Hall 03 and 06 in Oran.

== Results ==
=== Bracket ===
Round of 16
Carlos Bargados (ESP) | 4
Abdalla Abdelaziz (EGY) | 6
Elhami Shabani (KOS) | 0
Luigi Busà (ITA) | 1
Thanh-Liêm Lê (FRA) | 4
Ramez Bouallagui (TUN) | 1
Petar Zaborski (MKD) | 0
Enes Garibović (CRO) | 1
Đorđe Salapura (SRB) | 0
Erman Eltemur (TUR) | 2
Anass Alami (MAR) | 5
Tiago Gonçalves (POR) | 6
Panayiotis Loizides (CYP) | 0
Oussama Zaid (ALG) | 5

Quarterfinals
Abdalla Abdelaziz (EGY) | 1
Luigi Busà (ITA) | 1
Thanh-Liêm Lê (FRA) | 1
Enes Garibović (CRO) | 1
Erman Eltemur (TUR) | 1
Tiago Gonçalves (POR) | 0
Oussama Zaid (ALG) | 3
Hamza Turulja (BIH) | 0

Semifinals
Abdalla Abdelaziz (EGY) | 2
Enes Garibović (CRO) | 0
Erman Eltemur (TUR) | 0
Oussama Zaid (ALG) | 0

Final
Abdalla Abdelaziz (EGY) | 4
Oussama Zaid (ALG) | 5

=== Repechage ===
Repechage
Carlos Bargados (ESP) | 2
Luigi Busà (ITA) | 5

Bronze medal
Luigi Busà (ITA) | 3
Enes Garibović (CRO) | 0

Repechage
Panayiotis Loizides (CYP) | 0
Hamza Turulja (BIH) | 0

Bronze medal
Hamza Turulja (BIH) | 3
Erman Eltemur (TUR) | 1
