= Karate at the 2022 Mediterranean Games – Men's +84 kg =

Sports

Men's kumite +84 kg at the 2022 Mediterranean Games
- Venue: Mohammed ben Ahmed CCO Hall 03 and 06
- Date: 27 June
- Competitors: 15 from 15 nations

Medalists
| gold medal | Anđelo Kvesić | Croatia |
| silver medal | Hocine Daikhi | Algeria |
| bronze medal | Rijad Džuho | Bosnia and Herzegovina |
| bronze medal | Mehdi Sriti | Morocco |

The men's +84 kg competition in karate at the 2022 Mediterranean Games was held on 27 June at the Mohammed ben Ahmed CCO Hall 03 and 06 in Oran.

== Results ==
=== Bracket ===
Round of 16
Georgios Tzanos (GRE) | 0
Ömer Faruk Arslan (TUR) | 0
Anđelo Kvesić (CRO) | 5
Houssem Eddine Choiya (TUN) | 3
Nuri Abdulsalam (LBA) | 2
Hendrick Confiac (FRA) | 8
Rijad Džuho (BIH) | 3
Taha Mahmoud (EGY) | 2
Hocine Daikhi (ALG) | 7
Đorđe Tešanović (SRB) | 2
Nuno Valente (POR) | 6
Mathaios Stylianou (CYP) | 5
Mehdi Sriti (MAR) | 5
Stefan Joksimović (SLO) | 0

Quarterfinals
Georgios Tzanos (GRE) | 0
Anđelo Kvesić (CRO) | 4
Hendrick Confiac (FRA) | 1
Rijad Džuho (BIH) | 4
Hocine Daikhi (ALG) | 4
Nuno Valente (POR) | 1
Mehdi Sriti (MAR) | 11
Babacar Seck (ESP) | 3

Semifinals
Anđelo Kvesić (CRO) | 5
Rijad Džuho (BIH) | 1
Hocine Daikhi (ALG) | 7
Mehdi Sriti (MAR) | 1

Final
Anđelo Kvesić (CRO) | 2
Hocine Daikhi (ALG) | 1

=== Repechage ===
Repechage
Houssem Eddine Choiya (TUN) | 5
Georgios Tzanos (GRE) | 0

Bronze medal
Houssem Eddine Choiya (TUN) | 1
Rijad Džuho (BIH) | 2

Bronze medal
Nuno Valente (POR) | 0
Mehdi Sriti (MAR) | 8
