= Table tennis at the 2022 Mediterranean Games =

Table tennis competition

- Venue: Centre Mohammed Ben Ahmed
- Location: Oran, Algeria
- Dates: 26–30 June

The table tennis event at the 2022 Mediterranean Games was held in Oran, Algeria, from 26 to 30 June 2022.

== Medal table ==
Rank	Nation	Gold	Silver	Bronze	Total
1	Egypt	1	1	0	2
2	Spain	1	0	1	2
3	Monaco	1	0	0	1
3	Slovenia	1	0	0	1
5	Portugal	0	2	2	4
6	Italy	0	1	0	1
7	Greece	0	0	1	1
Totals (7 entries)		4	4	4	12

== Medalists ==
Event	Gold	Silver	Bronze
Men's singles	Álvaro Robles; Spain	Omar Assar; Egypt	João Geraldo; Portugal
Men's team	Slovenia; Peter Hribar; Darko Jorgić; Deni Kožul	Portugal; Diogo Chen; João Geraldo; João Monteiro	Greece; Konstantinos Konstantinopoulos; Ioannis Sgouropoulos
Women's singles	Xiaoxin Yang; Monaco	Shao Jieni; Portugal	María Xiao; Spain
Women's team	Egypt; Mariam Alhodaby; Dina Meshref; Hana Goda	Italy; Nicole Arlia; Giorgia Piccolin; Nikoleta Stefanova	Portugal; Inês Matos; Matilde Pinto; Shao Jieni
