= Wrestling at the 2022 Mediterranean Games – Women's freestyle 62 kg =

Wrestling competitions

Women's Freestyle 62 kg at the 2022 Mediterranean Games
- Venue: EMEC Hall
- Date: 28–29 June
- Competitors: 7 from 7 nations

Medalists
gold medal	Marwa Amri	Tunisia
silver medal	Améline Douarre	France
bronze medal	Lydia Pérez	Spain

The women's freestyle 62 kg competition of the wrestling events at the 2022 Mediterranean Games in Oran, Algeria, was held from 28 June to 29 June at the EMEC Hall.

== Results ==
28 June

=== Elimination groups ===
==== Group A ====
Pos	Athlete	Pld	W	L	CP	TP
1	Améline Douarre (FRA)	3	3	0	9	15
2	Lydia Pérez (ESP)	3	2	1	9	11
3	Aslı Tuğcu (TUR)	3	1	2	5	12
4	Ana Fabijan (SRB)	3	0	3	1	1

Source: Oran 2022

	Score		CP
Améline Douarre (FRA)	3–3	Lydia Pérez (ESP)	3–1 VPO1
Aslı Tuğcu (TUR)	11–0	Ana Fabijan (SRB)	4–0 VSU
Améline Douarre (FRA)	8–1	Aslı Tuğcu (TUR)	3–1 VPO1
Lydia Pérez (ESP)	2–0 Fall	Ana Fabijan (SRB)	5–0 VFA
Ana Fabijan (SRB)	3–4	Améline Douarre (FRA)	1–3 VPO1
Lydia Pérez (ESP)	6–0	Aslı Tuğcu (TUR)	3–0 VPO

==== Group B ====
Pos	Athlete	Pld	W	L	CP	TP
1	Marwa Amri (TUN)	2	2	0	9	12
2	Mastoura Soudani (ALG)	2	1	1	5	2
3	Elena Esposito (ITA)	2	0	2	0	0

Source: Oran 2022

	Score		CP
Mastoura Soudani (ALG)	0–10	Marwa Amri (TUN)	0–4 VSU
Elena Esposito (ITA)	0–2 Fall	Mastoura Soudani (ALG)	0–5 VFA
Marwa Amri (TUN)	2–0 Fall	Elena Esposito (ITA)	5–0 VFA

Semifinals
Améline Douarre (FRA)	9
Mastoura Soudani (ALG)	3
Lydia Pérez (ESP)	0
Marwa Amri (TUN)	11

Final
Améline Douarre (FRA)	2
Marwa Amri (TUN)	9
Bronze medal
Mastoura Soudani (ALG)	11
Lydia Pérez (ESP)	13
