= Cycling at the 2022 Mediterranean Games =

Algerian bicycle sporting event

- Venue: Oran
- Dates: 30 June – 2 July

The cycling competitions at the 2022 Mediterranean Games was held on 30 June and 2 July 2022 in Oran, Algeria.

== Medal summary ==
=== Medalists ===
Event	Gold		Silver		Bronze	
Men's road race	Paul Penhoët; France	3h 12' 23"	Ewen Costiou; France	+ 0"	Valentin Retailleau; France	+ 5"
Men's time trial	Rafael Reis; Portugal	31' 28.28"	Enzo Paleni; France	+49.27"	Ognjen Ilić; Serbia	+50.75"
Women's road race	Barbara Guarischi; Italy	1h 58' 24"	Daniela Campos; Portugal	+ 0"	Sandra Alonso; Spain	+ 0"
Women's time trial	Vittoria Guazzini; Italy	22' 24.40"	Eugenia Bujak; Slovenia	+49.80"	Cédrine Kerbaol; France	+1' 28.37"

=== Medal table ===
Rank	Nation	Gold	Silver	Bronze	Total
1	Italy	2	0	0	2
2	France	1	2	2	5
3	Portugal	1	1	0	2
4	Slovenia	0	1	0	1
5	Serbia	0	0	1	1
5	Spain	0	0	1	1
Totals (6 entries)		4	4	4	12
