= Archery at the 2022 Mediterranean Games – Men's team =

Event at the 2022 Mediterranean Games

Men's team at the 2022 Mediterranean Games
- Venue: Annex Stadium Olympic Complex
- Date: 29 June – 1 July
- Competitors: 27 from 9 nations
- Teams: 9

Medalists
gold medal	Iban Bariteaud; Nicolas Bernardi; Romain Fichet	France
silver medal	Pablo Acha; Miguel Alvariño; Daniel Castro	Spain
bronze medal	Samet Ak; Mete Gazoz; Muhammed Yıldırmış	Turkey

The men's team competition in archery at the 2022 Mediterranean Games was held from 29 June to 1 July at the Annex Stadium of the Olympic Complex in Oran.

== Qualification round ==
Results after 216 arrows.

Rank	Nation	Name	Score	10+X	X
1	Italy	Federico Musolesi; Mauro Nespoli; Alessandro Paoli	1969	75	21
2	Turkey	Samet Ak; Mete Gazoz; Muhammed Yıldırmış	1952	78	26
3	Spain	Pablo Acha; Miguel Alvariño; Daniel Castro	1938	63	20
4	France	Iban Bariteaud; Nicolas Bernardi; Romain Fichet	1920	60	16
5	Slovenia	Den Habjan Malavašič; Sergej Podkrajšek; Žiga Ravnikar	1907	57	13
6	Portugal	Nuno Carneiro; Luís Gonçalves; Tiago Matos	1835	48	14
7	Algeria	Imadeddine Bakri; Abdelmajid Hocine; Ayoub Rahlaoui	1774	30	9
8	Cyprus	Charalambos Charalambous; Konstantinos Loizou; Constantinos Panagi	1766	41	11
9	Kosovo	Hazir Asllani; Edi Dvorani; Valmir Gllareva	1751	43	8

== Elimination round ==
1/8 finals
9	Kosovo	0	49	43	46
8	Cyprus	6	52	50	48

Quarterfinals
1	Italy	6	53	57	56
8	Cyprus	0	52	50	46
5	Slovenia
4	France	w/o
3	Spain	6	47	55	56
6	Portugal	0	40	50	53
7	Algeria	0	46	48	46
2	Turkey	6	50	54	51

Semifinals
1	Italy	0	50	51	51
4	France	6	56	58	52
3	Spain	6	51	55	58	56
2	Turkey	2	53	52	54	53

Final
4	France	6	52	50	54	53
3	Spain	2	51	49	55	52
Third place
1	Italy	4	57	49	58	53	26
2	Turkey	5	56	51	52	55	28
