= Boxing at the 2022 Mediterranean Games – Women's light flyweight =

Boxing competitions

Women's light flyweight at the 2022 Mediterranean Games
- Venue: EMEC Hall
- Date: 28 June – 1 July
- Competitors: 6 from 6 nations

Medalists
gold medal	Giordana Sorrentino	Italy
silver medal	Romane Moulai	France
bronze medal	Buse Naz Çakıroğlu	Turkey
bronze medal	Laura Fuertes	Spain

The women's light flyweight competition of the boxing events at the 2022 Mediterranean Games in Oran, Algeria, was held from 28 June to 1 July at the EMEC Hall.

Like all Mediterranean Games boxing events, the competition was a straight single-elimination tournament. Both semifinal losers were awarded bronze medals, so no boxers competed again after their first loss.

== Results ==
Quarterfinals
Eman Mohamed (EGY)	0
Giordana Sorrentino (ITA)	3
Fatiha Mansouri (ALG)	1
Buse Naz Çakıroğlu (TUR)	2

Semifinals
Laura Fuertes (ESP)	0
Giordana Sorrentino (ITA)	3
Buse Naz Çakıroğlu (TUR)
Romane Moulai (FRA)	WO

Final
Giordana Sorrentino (ITA)	3
Romane Moulai (FRA)	0
