= Archery at the 2022 Mediterranean Games =

Archery competition

- Venue: Annex Stadium Olympic Complex
- Dates: 29 June – 1 July
- Competitors: 63 from 17 nations

The Archery event at the 2022 Mediterranean Games was held in Oran, Algeria, from 29 June to 1 July 2022.

== Medal summary ==
=== Medalists ===
Event	Gold	Silver	Bronze
Men's individual	Federico Musolesi; Italy	Mete Gazoz; Turkey	Mauro Nespoli; Italy
Men's team	France; Iban Bariteaud; Nicolas Bernardi; Romain Fichet	Spain; Pablo Acha; Miguel Alvariño; Daniel Castro	Turkey; Samet Ak; Mete Gazoz; Muhammed Yıldırmış
Women's individual	Leyre Fernández; Spain	Lucilla Boari; Italy	Anaëlle Florent; France
Women's team	Turkey; Yasemin Anagöz; Ezgi Başaran; Gülnaz Büşranur Coşkun	Italy; Tatiana Andreoli; Lucilla Boari; Chiara Rebagliati	France; Anaëlle Florent; Lucie Maunier; Lauréna Villard
Mixed team	Turkey; Yasemin Anagöz; Mete Gazoz	Italy; Lucilla Boari; Mauro Nespoli	Spain; Elia Canales; Miguel Alvariño

=== Medal table ===
Rank	Nation	Gold	Silver	Bronze	Total
1	Turkey	2	1	1	4
2	Italy	1	3	1	5
3	Spain	1	1	1	3
4	France	1	0	2	3
Totals (4 entries)		5	5	5	15
