= Boxing at the 2022 Mediterranean Games – Men's heavyweight =

Boxing competitions

Men's heavyweight boxing at the 2022 Mediterranean Games
- Venue: EMEC Hall
- Date: 26 June – 1 July
- Competitors: 9 from 9 nations

Medalists
gold medal	Aziz Abbes Mouhiidine	Italy
silver medal	Moh Said Hamani	Algeria
bronze medal	Soheb Bouafia	France
bronze medal	Vagkan Nanitzanian	Greece

The men's heavyweight (91 kg) competition of the boxing events at the 2022 Mediterranean Games in Oran, Algeria, was held from 26 June to 1 July at the EMEC Hall.

Like all Mediterranean Games boxing events, the competition was a straight single-elimination tournament. Both semifinal losers were awarded bronze medals, so no boxers competed again after their first loss.

== Results ==
Round of 16
Burak Aksın (TUR)	0
Soheb Bouafia (FRA)	3

Quarterfinals
Džemal Bošnjak (BIH)	0
Soheb Bouafia (FRA)	2
Moh Said Hamani (ALG)	2
Alaa Eldin Ghousoon (SYR)	1
Mohamed Ibrahim (EGY)	0
Vagkan Nanitzanian (GRE)	3
Enmanuel Reyes (ESP)	0
Aziz Abbes Mouhiidine (ITA)	3

Semifinals
Soheb Bouafia (FRA)	0
Moh Said Hamani (ALG)	3
Vagkan Nanitzanian (GRE)	0
Aziz Abbes Mouhiidine (ITA)	3

Final
Moh Said Hamani (ALG)	0
Aziz Abbes Mouhiidine (ITA)	3
