= Portugal at the 2022 Mediterranean Games =

- IOC code: POR
- NOC: Olympic Committee of Portugal

in Oran, Algeria 25 June 2022 – 6 July 2022
- Medals Ranked 9th: Gold 7 Silver 10 Bronze 8 Total 25

Mediterranean Games appearances
- 1951; 1955; 1959; 1963; 1967; 1971; 1975; 1979; 1983; 1987; 1991; 1993; 1997; 2001; 2005; 2009; 2013; 2018; 2022

Portugal competed at the 2022 Mediterranean Games held in Oran, Algeria from 25 June to 6 July 2022.

== Medalists ==
Medal	Name	Sport	Event	Date
Gold	Diogo Ribeiro	Swimming	Men's 50 metre butterfly	1 July
Gold	Camila Rebelo	Swimming	Women's 200 metre backstroke	2 July
Gold	João Coelho	Athletics	Men's 400 metres	
Gold	Leandro Ramos	Athletics	Men's javelin throw	
Gold	Cátia Azevedo	Athletics	Women's 400 metres	
Gold	Rafael Reis	Cycling	Men's time trial	
Gold	Camila Rebelo	Swimming	Women's 100 metre backstroke	5 July
Silver	Ana Monteiro	Swimming	Women's 200 metre butterfly	1 July
Silver	Diogo Ribeiro	Swimming	Men's 100 metre freestyle	2 July
Silver	Miguel Nascimento	Swimming	Men's 50 metre freestyle	4 July
Silver	Ana Rodrigues	Swimming	Women's 50 metre breaststroke	4 July
Silver	Daniela Campos	Cycling	Women's road race	
Silver	Lorène Bazolo	Athletics	Women's 100 metres	
Silver	Liliana Cá	Athletics	Women's discus throw	
Silver	Maria Inês Barros	Shooting	Women's trap	
Silver	Diogo Chen; João Geraldo; João Monteiro	Table tennis	Men's team	
Silver	Shao Jieni	Table tennis	Women's singles	
Bronze	Ana Filipa Martins	Gymnastics	Women's uneven bars	29 June
Bronze	Tiago Pereira	Athletics	Men's triple jump	
Bronze	Lorène Bazolo	Athletics	Women's 200 metres	
Bronze	Evelise Veiga	Athletics	Women's long jump	
Bronze	Rafaela Azevedo	Swimming	Women's 50 metre backstroke	3 July
Bronze	Raquel Pereira	Swimming	Women's 200 metre breaststroke	5 July
Bronze	João Geraldo	Table tennis	Men's singles	
Bronze	Inês Matos; Matilde Pinto; Shao Jieni	Table tennis	Women's team	

== Archery ==
Portugal competed in archery.

Athlete	Event	Ranking round		Round of 64	Round of 32	Round of 16	Quarterfinals	Semifinals	Final/BM	Rank
Athlete	Event	Score	Rank	Round of 64	Round of 32	Round of 16	Quarterfinals	Semifinals	Final/BM	Rank
Nuno Carneiro	Men's Individual	633	13	Bye	Charalambous (CYP); W 6-0	Bakri (ALG); W 6-4	Bernardi (FRA); L 1-7	Did not advance		
Tiago Matos	Men's Individual	606	25	Bye	Ravnikar (SLO); L 1-7	Did not advance				
Luís Gonçalves	Men's Individual	596	28	Bye	Ak (TUR); L 0-6	Did not advance				
Tiago Matos; Luís Gonçalves; Nuno Carneiro	Men's team	1835	6	—	—	Spain; L 0-6	Did not advance			

== Athletics ==
Portugal won eight medals in athletics.

== Artistic gymnastics ==
Portugal won one bronze medal in artistic gymnastics.

== Cycling ==
Portugal won two medals in cycling.

== Football ==
Portugal competed in the football tournament.

== Judo ==
Portugal competed in judo.

== Karate ==
Portugal competed in karate.

Men

Athlete	Event	Round of 16	Quarterfinals	Semifinals	Repechage	Final / BM	
Athlete	Event	Opposition Result	Opposition Result	Opposition Result	Opposition Result	Opposition Result	Rank
Tiago Gonçalves	−75 kg	Alami (MAR); W 6–5	Eltemur (TUR); L 0–1	—	—	—	7
Nuno Valente	+84 kg	Stylianou (CYP); W 6–5	Daikhi (ALG); L 1–4	—	—	Sriti (MAR); L 0–8	5

Women

Athlete	Event	Round of 16	Quarterfinals	Semifinals	Repechage	Final / BM	
Athlete	Event	Opposition Result	Opposition Result	Opposition Result	Opposition Result	Opposition Result	Rank
Sara Leal	−50 kg	Bye	Ouikene (ALG); L 0–2	—	Pinilla (ESP); L 1–4	—	7
Constança Matos	−55 kg	Yakan (TUR); L 1–7	—	—	—	—	11

== Shooting ==
Portugal won one medal in shooting.

== Swimming ==
Portugal won nine medals in swimming.

== Table tennis ==
Portugal won four medals in table tennis.

== Tennis ==
Portugal competed in tennis.

== Water polo ==
Summary

Team	Event	Group stage					Semifinal	Final / BM / Pl.	
Team	Event	Opposition Score	Opposition Score	Opposition Score	Opposition Score	Rank	Opposition Score	Opposition Score	Rank
Portugal men's	Men's tournament	Slovenia; L 5–18	France; L 10–15	Montenegro; L 4–23	Serbia; L 3–16	5	did not advance		9

Group play

Pos	Team	Pld	W	D	L	GF	GA	GD	Pts	Qualification
1	Serbia	4	4	0	0	65	24	+41	8	Semifinals
2	Montenegro	4	3	0	1	58	27	+31	6	Semifinals
3	Slovenia	4	2	0	2	41	45	−4	4	Fifth place game
4	France	4	1	0	3	37	55	−18	2	Seventh place game
5	Portugal	4	0	0	4	22	72	−50	0	

Source: Oran 2022

24 June 2022; 10:00	Report	Slovenia	18–5	Portugal	Oran; Referees: Arnaldo Petronilli (ITA), Emanuel Manol Taylan (TUR)
24 June 2022; 10:00	Report	Score by quarters: 5–0, 5–1, 4–2, 4–2			Oran; Referees: Arnaldo Petronilli (ITA), Emanuel Manol Taylan (TUR)
24 June 2022; 10:00	Report	Lah 6	Goals	Moreira 4	Oran; Referees: Arnaldo Petronilli (ITA), Emanuel Manol Taylan (TUR)

25 June 2022; 10:00	Report	Portugal	10–15	France	Oran; Referees: Grigorios Spanoudis (GRE), Emanuel Manol Taylan (TUR)
25 June 2022; 10:00	Report	Score by quarters: 2–2, 1–4, 3–4, 4–5			Oran; Referees: Grigorios Spanoudis (GRE), Emanuel Manol Taylan (TUR)
25 June 2022; 10:00	Report	Moreira 3	Goals	Mas 5	Oran; Referees: Grigorios Spanoudis (GRE), Emanuel Manol Taylan (TUR)

26 June 2022; 12:00	Report	Montenegro	23–4	Portugal	Oran; Referees: Arnaldo Petronilli (ITA), Sergio Jiménez (ESP)
26 June 2022; 12:00	Report	Score by quarters: 5–1, 5–2, 6–1, 7–0			Oran; Referees: Arnaldo Petronilli (ITA), Sergio Jiménez (ESP)
26 June 2022; 12:00	Report	Vučković 5	Goals	Moreira, Santiago 2	Oran; Referees: Arnaldo Petronilli (ITA), Sergio Jiménez (ESP)

28 June 2022; 12:00	Report	Portugal	3–16	Serbia	Oran; Referees: Sergio Jiménez (ESP), Emanuel Manol Taylan (TUR)
28 June 2022; 12:00	Report	Score by quarters: 0–4, 1–3, 1–4, 1–5			Oran; Referees: Sergio Jiménez (ESP), Emanuel Manol Taylan (TUR)
28 June 2022; 12:00	Report	Santiago 3	Goals	Dimitrijević, Kovačević 3	Oran; Referees: Sergio Jiménez (ESP), Emanuel Manol Taylan (TUR)

== Wrestling ==
Portugal competed in wrestling.
