= Taekwondo at the 2022 Mediterranean Games =

Taekwondo competition

- Venue: Mohammed ben Ahmed CCO Hall
- Dates: 3–4 July

The Taekwondo event at the 2022 Mediterranean Games was held in Oran, Algeria, from 3 to 4 July 2022.

== Medal table ==
Rank	Nation	Gold	Silver	Bronze	Total
1	Turkey	3	1	1	5
2	Spain	2	3	0	5
3	Croatia	2	0	3	5
4	Egypt	1	1	2	4
5	Morocco	0	3	0	3
6	France	0	0	3	3
7	Greece	0	0	2	2
7	Italy	0	0	2	2
9	North Macedonia	0	0	1	1
9	Slovenia	0	0	1	1
9	Tunisia	0	0	1	1
Totals (11 entries)		8	8	16	32

== Medal summary ==
=== Men's events ===
Event	Gold	Silver	Bronze
Flyweight (58 kg)	Adrián Vicente; Spain	Omar Lakehal; Morocco	Ömer Faruk Dayıoğlu; Turkey
Flyweight (58 kg)	Adrián Vicente; Spain	Omar Lakehal; Morocco	Domen Molj; Slovenia
Lightweight (68 kg)	Javier Pérez; Spain	Hakan Reçber; Turkey	Konstantinos Chamalidis; Greece
Lightweight (68 kg)	Javier Pérez; Spain	Hakan Reçber; Turkey	Lovre Brečić; Croatia
Middleweight (80 kg)	Seif Eissa; Egypt	Daniel Quesada; Spain	Firas Katoussi; Tunisia
Middleweight (80 kg)	Seif Eissa; Egypt	Daniel Quesada; Spain	Apostolos Telikostoglou; Greece
Heavyweight (+80 kg)	Ivan Šapina; Croatia	Ayoub Bassel; Morocco	Roberto Botta; Italy
Heavyweight (+80 kg)	Ivan Šapina; Croatia	Ayoub Bassel; Morocco	Dejan Georgievski; North Macedonia

=== Women's events ===
Event	Gold	Silver	Bronze
Flyweight (49 kg)	Merve Dinçel; Turkey	Adriana Cerezo; Spain	Bruna Duvančić; Croatia
Flyweight (49 kg)	Merve Dinçel; Turkey	Adriana Cerezo; Spain	Shahd El-Hosseiny; Egypt
Lightweight (57 kg)	Hatice Kübra İlgün; Turkey	Ashrakat Darwish; Egypt	Giada Al Halwani; Italy
Lightweight (57 kg)	Hatice Kübra İlgün; Turkey	Ashrakat Darwish; Egypt	Kanélya Carabin; France
Middleweight (67 kg)	Matea Jelić; Croatia	Cecilia Castro; Spain	Aya Shehata; Egypt
Middleweight (67 kg)	Matea Jelić; Croatia	Cecilia Castro; Spain	Magda Wiet-Hénin; France
Heavyweight (+67 kg)	Nafia Kuş; Turkey	Fatima-Ezzahra Aboufaras; Morocco	Nika Petanjek; Croatia
Heavyweight (+67 kg)	Nafia Kuş; Turkey	Fatima-Ezzahra Aboufaras; Morocco	Althéa Laurin; France
