= Judo at the 2022 Mediterranean Games – Women's 78 kg =

Judo competitions

Judo Women's 78 kg at the 2022 Mediterranean Games
- Venue: Mohammed Ben Ahmed Convention Centre – Hall 03 and 06
- Location: Oran, Algeria
- Date: 1 July
- Competitors: 9 from 9 nations

Medalists
gold medal	Loriana Kuka	Kosovo
silver medal	Chloé Buttigieg	France
bronze medal	Petrunjela Pavić	Croatia
bronze medal	Nurcan Yılmaz	Turkey

The women's 78 kg competition in judo at the 2022 Mediterranean Games was held on 1 July at the Mohammed Ben Ahmed Convention Centre in Oran.

== Results ==
=== Main bracket ===
Round of 16
Jovana Peković (MNE)	01
Metka Lobnik (SLO)	00
Nurcan Yılmaz (TUR)	10
Lucía Pérez (ESP)	00
Petrunjela Pavić (CRO)	w/o
Natasha Tarabay (LBN)

Quarterfinals
Kaouthar Ouallal (ALG)	10
Jovana Peković (MNE)	01
Chloé Buttigieg (FRA)	w/o
Linda Politi (ITA)
Loriana Kuka (KOS)	10
Nurcan Yılmaz (TUR)	00
Hafsa Yatim (MAR)	00
Petrunjela Pavić (CRO)	01

Semifinals
Kaouthar Ouallal (ALG)	00
Chloé Buttigieg (FRA)	10
Loriana Kuka (KOS)	10
Petrunjela Pavić (CRO)	00

Final
Chloé Buttigieg (FRA)	00
Loriana Kuka (KOS)	01

=== Repechage ===
Repechage
Jovana Peković (MNE)	w/o
Linda Politi (ITA)
Nurcan Yılmaz (TUR)	10
Hafsa Yatim (MAR)	00

Bronze medal
Jovana Peković (MNE)	00
Petrunjela Pavić (CRO)	11
Nurcan Yılmaz (TUR)	01
Kaouthar Ouallal (ALG)	00
