= Boxing at the 2022 Mediterranean Games – Men's lightweight =

Boxing competitions

Men's lightweight boxing at the 2022 Mediterranean Games
- Venue: EMEC Hall
- Date: 27 June – 1 July
- Competitors: 10 from 10 nations

Medalists
| gold medal | Mohamed Hamout | Morocco |
| silver medal | Enzo Grau | France |
| bronze medal | Abdelnacer Benlaribi | Algeria |
| bronze medal | Giuseppe Canonico | Italy |

The men's lightweight (60 kg) competition of the boxing events at the 2022 Mediterranean Games in Oran, Algeria, was held from 27 June to 1 July at the EMEC Hall.

Like all Mediterranean Games boxing events, the competition was a straight single-elimination tournament. Both semifinal losers were awarded bronze medals, so no boxers competed again after their first loss.

== Results ==
Round of 16
Hakan Doğan (TUR) | 1
Abdelnacer Benlaribi (ALG) | 2
Mohamed Hamout (MAR) | 3
Mostafa Komsan (EGY) | 0

Quarterfinals
José Quiles (ESP) | 0
Abdelnacer Benlaribi (ALG) | 3
Enzo Grau (FRA) | 3
Tadej Černoga (SLO) | 0
Giuseppe Canonico (ITA) | RSC-I
Nikola Ivković (BIH)
Mohamed Hamout (MAR) | 3
Nazif Sejdi (SRB) | 0

Semifinals
Abdelnacer Benlaribi (ALG) | 1
Enzo Grau (FRA) | 2
Giuseppe Canonico (ITA) | 0
Mohamed Hamout (MAR) | 3

Final
Enzo Grau (FRA) | 0
Mohamed Hamout (MAR) | 3
