= Water polo at the 2022 Mediterranean Games =

Water polo competition

Tournament details
- Host country: Algeria
- Venue: 1 (in 1 host city)
- Dates: 24–30 June
- Teams: 9 (from 1 confederation)

Final positions
- Champions: Serbia (3rd title)
- Runners-up: Montenegro
- Third place: Spain
- Fourth place: Italy

Tournament statistics
- Matches played: 22
- Goals scored: 474 (21.55 per match)
- Top scorers: (Serbia) Nikola Kojić (Slovenia) Jaša Lah (17 goals)

The water polo tournament at the 2022 Mediterranean Games in Oran took place between 24 and 30 June at the Miloud Hadefi Complex Aquatic Center in Bir El Djir, Oran. The competition was held only for men's teams.

== Medal summary ==
=== Events ===
Event	Gold	Silver	Bronze
Men	Serbia; Vuk Anđelić; Bogdan Brešćanski; Marko Dimitrijević; Bogdan Gavrilović; Nikola Kojić; Aleksandar Kovačević; Mitar Maraš; Petar Pajković; Zoran Poznanović; Nikola Vuk Radulović; Petar Stanić; Viktor Urošević; Radosav Virijević	Montenegro; Neđo Baštrica; Andrija Bjelica; Danilo Dragović; Danilo Krivokapić; Pavle Krivokapić; Milan Nikaljević; Draško Samardžić; Danilo Stupar; Balša Vučković; Lazar Vukićević; Vladan Vukićević; Dušan Vuković; Miloš Vukšić	Spain; Hugo Castro; Marc Frigola; Didac García; Gerard Gil; Biel Gomila; Luca de la Cruz; Javier Ibáñez; Daniel Ivaylov; Robert López; Javier Otero; Jan Pérez; Xavier Teclas; Joan Villamayor

== Participating teams ==
- France
- Greece
- Italy
- Montenegro
- Portugal
- Serbia
- Slovenia
- Spain
- Turkey

== Preliminary round ==
All times are local (UTC+1).

=== Group A ===
Pos	Team	Pld	W	D	L	GF	GA	GD	Pts	Qualification
1	Spain	3	3	0	0	41	27	+14	6	Semifinals
2	Italy	3	2	0	1	31	22	+9	4	Semifinals
3	Greece	3	1	0	2	38	29	+9	2	Fifth place game
4	Turkey	3	0	0	3	17	49	−32	0	Seventh place game

Source: Oran 2022

24 June 2022; 16:00	Report	Greece	11–12	Spain	Oran; Referees: Igor Virijević (SRB), Ghislain Dehon (FRA)
24 June 2022; 16:00	Report	Score by quarters: 2–2, 2–4, 4–2, 3–4			Oran; Referees: Igor Virijević (SRB), Ghislain Dehon (FRA)
24 June 2022; 16:00	Report	four players 2	Goals	López 5	Oran; Referees: Igor Virijević (SRB), Ghislain Dehon (FRA)

24 June 2022; 18:00	Report	Turkey	2–13	Italy	Oran; Referees: Matevž Homovec (SLO), Eurico da Silva (POR)
24 June 2022; 18:00	Report	Score by quarters: 1–2, 1–4, 0–2, 0–5			Oran; Referees: Matevž Homovec (SLO), Eurico da Silva (POR)
24 June 2022; 18:00	Report	Caner, Kuloğlu 1	Goals	Cora, Taramasco 4	Oran; Referees: Matevž Homovec (SLO), Eurico da Silva (POR)

26 June 2022; 16:00	Report	Spain	14–8	Italy	Oran; Referees: Igor Virijević (SRB), Andrija Đurašković (MNE)
26 June 2022; 16:00	Report	Score by quarters: 2–1, 3–3, 5–2, 4–2			Oran; Referees: Igor Virijević (SRB), Andrija Đurašković (MNE)
26 June 2022; 16:00	Report	Hugo Castro 4	Goals	Nenni 3	Oran; Referees: Igor Virijević (SRB), Andrija Đurašković (MNE)

26 June 2022; 18:00	Report	Greece	21–7	Turkey	Oran; Referees: Eurico da Silva (POR), Matevž Homovec (SLO)
26 June 2022; 18:00	Report	Score by quarters: 4–2, 4–3, 7–1, 6–1			Oran; Referees: Eurico da Silva (POR), Matevž Homovec (SLO)
26 June 2022; 18:00	Report	Spachits 4	Goals	Erçıkdı, Koyuncu 2	Oran; Referees: Eurico da Silva (POR), Matevž Homovec (SLO)

28 June 2022; 16:00	Report	Spain	15–8	Turkey	Oran; Referees: Matevž Homovec (SLO), Ghislain Dehon (FRA)
28 June 2022; 16:00	Report	Score by quarters: 6–3, 1–2, 4–2, 4–1			Oran; Referees: Matevž Homovec (SLO), Ghislain Dehon (FRA)
28 June 2022; 16:00	Report	Frigola, Gil 3	Goals	Caner 5	Oran; Referees: Matevž Homovec (SLO), Ghislain Dehon (FRA)

28 June 2022; 18:00	Report	Italy	10–6	Greece	Oran; Referees: Eurico da Silva (POR), Igor Virijević (SRB)
28 June 2022; 18:00	Report	Score by quarters: 1–1, 4–2, 3–2, 2–1			Oran; Referees: Eurico da Silva (POR), Igor Virijević (SRB)
28 June 2022; 18:00	Report	Bragantini, Nenni 3	Goals	Almyras, Kandanoleon 2	Oran; Referees: Eurico da Silva (POR), Igor Virijević (SRB)

=== Group B ===
Pos	Team	Pld	W	D	L	GF	GA	GD	Pts	Qualification
1	Serbia	4	4	0	0	65	24	+41	8	Semifinals
2	Montenegro	4	3	0	1	58	27	+31	6	Semifinals
3	Slovenia	4	2	0	2	41	45	−4	4	Fifth place game
4	France	4	1	0	3	37	55	−18	2	Seventh place game
5	Portugal	4	0	0	4	22	72	−50	0	

Source: Oran 2022

24 June 2022; 10:00	Report	Slovenia	18–5	Portugal	Oran; Referees: Arnaldo Petronilli (ITA), Emanuel Manol Taylan (TUR)
24 June 2022; 10:00	Report	Score by quarters: 5–0, 5–1, 4–2, 4–2			Oran; Referees: Arnaldo Petronilli (ITA), Emanuel Manol Taylan (TUR)
24 June 2022; 10:00	Report	Lah 6	Goals	Moreira 4	Oran; Referees: Arnaldo Petronilli (ITA), Emanuel Manol Taylan (TUR)

24 June 2022; 12:00	Report	France	8–16	Montenegro	Oran; Referees: Grigorios Spanoudis (GRE), Sergio Jiménez (ESP)
24 June 2022; 12:00	Report	Score by quarters: 2–4, 2–4, 1–4, 3–4			Oran; Referees: Grigorios Spanoudis (GRE), Sergio Jiménez (ESP)
24 June 2022; 12:00	Report	Mas, Rodrigues 4	Goals	L. Vukičević 5	Oran; Referees: Grigorios Spanoudis (GRE), Sergio Jiménez (ESP)

25 June 2022; 10:00	Report	Portugal	10–15	France	Oran; Referees: Grigorios Spanoudis (GRE), Emanuel Manol Taylan (TUR)
25 June 2022; 10:00	Report	Score by quarters: 2–2, 1–4, 3–4, 4–5			Oran; Referees: Grigorios Spanoudis (GRE), Emanuel Manol Taylan (TUR)
25 June 2022; 10:00	Report	Moreira 3	Goals	Mas 5	Oran; Referees: Grigorios Spanoudis (GRE), Emanuel Manol Taylan (TUR)

25 June 2022; 12:00	Report	Serbia	22–6	Slovenia	Oran; Referees: Arnaldo Petronilli (ITA), Sergio Jiménez (ESP)
25 June 2022; 12:00	Report	Score by quarters: 3–2, 3–2, 7–1, 9–1			Oran; Referees: Arnaldo Petronilli (ITA), Sergio Jiménez (ESP)
25 June 2022; 12:00	Report	Kovačević 4	Goals	Lah 3	Oran; Referees: Arnaldo Petronilli (ITA), Sergio Jiménez (ESP)

26 June 2022; 10:00	Report	France	7–18	Serbia	Oran; Referees: Emanuel Manol Taylan (TUR), Grigorios Spanoudis (GRE)
26 June 2022; 10:00	Report	Score by quarters: 2–4, 1–8, 3–2, 1–4			Oran; Referees: Emanuel Manol Taylan (TUR), Grigorios Spanoudis (GRE)
26 June 2022; 10:00	Report	Mathieu 3	Goals	Kojić 6	Oran; Referees: Emanuel Manol Taylan (TUR), Grigorios Spanoudis (GRE)

26 June 2022; 12:00	Report	Montenegro	23–4	Portugal	Oran; Referees: Arnaldo Petronilli (ITA), Sergio Jiménez (ESP)
26 June 2022; 12:00	Report	Score by quarters: 5–1, 5–2, 6–1, 7–0			Oran; Referees: Arnaldo Petronilli (ITA), Sergio Jiménez (ESP)
26 June 2022; 12:00	Report	Vučković 5	Goals	Moreira, Santiago 2	Oran; Referees: Arnaldo Petronilli (ITA), Sergio Jiménez (ESP)

27 June 2022; 10:00	Report	Serbia	9–8	Montenegro	Oran; Referees: Sergio Jiménez (ESP), Grigorios Spanoudis (GRE)
27 June 2022; 10:00	Report	Score by quarters: 2–3, 1–2, 2–1, 4–2			Oran; Referees: Sergio Jiménez (ESP), Grigorios Spanoudis (GRE)
27 June 2022; 10:00	Report	Kojić 3	Goals	Baštrica 2	Oran; Referees: Sergio Jiménez (ESP), Grigorios Spanoudis (GRE)

27 June 2022; 12:00	Report	Slovenia	11–7	France	Oran; Referees: Andrija Đurašković (MNE), Arnaldo Petronilli (ITA)
27 June 2022; 12:00	Report	Score by quarters: 3–1, 1–2, 4–1, 3–3			Oran; Referees: Andrija Đurašković (MNE), Arnaldo Petronilli (ITA)
27 June 2022; 12:00	Report	Zdravkovič Gligorovski 3	Goals	Roussel 2	Oran; Referees: Andrija Đurašković (MNE), Arnaldo Petronilli (ITA)

28 June 2022; 10:00	Report	Montenegro	11–6	Slovenia	Oran; Referees: Arnaldo Petronilli (ITA), Grigorios Spanoudis (GRE)
28 June 2022; 10:00	Report	Score by quarters: 3–0, 4–4, 1–2, 3–0			Oran; Referees: Arnaldo Petronilli (ITA), Grigorios Spanoudis (GRE)
28 June 2022; 10:00	Report	Vučković, L. Vukičević 3	Goals	Čanč 2	Oran; Referees: Arnaldo Petronilli (ITA), Grigorios Spanoudis (GRE)

28 June 2022; 12:00	Report	Portugal	3–16	Serbia	Oran; Referees: Sergio Jiménez (ESP), Emanuel Manol Taylan (TUR)
28 June 2022; 12:00	Report	Score by quarters: 0–4, 1–3, 1–4, 1–5			Oran; Referees: Sergio Jiménez (ESP), Emanuel Manol Taylan (TUR)
28 June 2022; 12:00	Report	Santiago 3	Goals	Dimitrijević, Kovačević 3	Oran; Referees: Sergio Jiménez (ESP), Emanuel Manol Taylan (TUR)

== Final round ==
=== Bracket ===
Semifinals
29 June
Spain	9
Montenegro	10
29 June
Serbia	8
Italy	7

Gold medal
30 June
Montenegro	8
Serbia	9
Bronze medal
30 June
Spain	16
Italy	8

=== Semifinals ===
29 June 2022; 15:00	Report	Spain	9–10	Montenegro	Oran; Referees: Arnaldo Petronilli (ITA), Igor Virijević (SRB)
29 June 2022; 15:00	Report	Score by quarters: 2–2, 3–1, 2–3, 2–4			Oran; Referees: Arnaldo Petronilli (ITA), Igor Virijević (SRB)
29 June 2022; 15:00	Report	three players 2	Goals	Baštrica 4	Oran; Referees: Arnaldo Petronilli (ITA), Igor Virijević (SRB)

29 June 2022; 17:00	Report	Serbia	8–7	Italy	Oran; Referees: Grigorios Spanoudis (GRE), Emanuel Manol Taylan (TUR)
29 June 2022; 17:00	Report	Score by quarters: 3–1, 2–0, 1–4, 2–2			Oran; Referees: Grigorios Spanoudis (GRE), Emanuel Manol Taylan (TUR)
29 June 2022; 17:00	Report	Dimitrijević, Gavrilović 2	Goals	Taramasco 3	Oran; Referees: Grigorios Spanoudis (GRE), Emanuel Manol Taylan (TUR)

=== Seventh place game ===
29 June 2022; 10:00	Report	Turkey	10–11	France	Oran; Referees: Andrija Đurašković (MNE), Matevž Homovec (SLO)
29 June 2022; 10:00	Report	Score by quarters: 1–1, 1–3, 4–3, 4–4			Oran; Referees: Andrija Đurašković (MNE), Matevž Homovec (SLO)
29 June 2022; 10:00	Report	Caner 5	Goals	Mas 3	Oran; Referees: Andrija Đurašković (MNE), Matevž Homovec (SLO)

=== Fifth place game ===
29 June 2022; 12:00	Report	Greece	16–12	Slovenia	Oran; Referees: Sergio Jiménez (ESP), Ghislain Dehon (FRA)
29 June 2022; 12:00	Report	Score by quarters: 5–1, 2–4, 5–4, 4–3			Oran; Referees: Sergio Jiménez (ESP), Ghislain Dehon (FRA)
29 June 2022; 12:00	Report	Bitsakos, Mathiopoulos 3	Goals	Lah 5	Oran; Referees: Sergio Jiménez (ESP), Ghislain Dehon (FRA)

=== Bronze medal game ===
30 June 2022; 10:00	Report	Spain	16–8	Italy	Oran; Referees: Andrija Đurašković (MNE), Eurico da Silva (POR)
30 June 2022; 10:00	Report	Score by quarters: 2–4, 4–1, 5–2, 5–1			Oran; Referees: Andrija Đurašković (MNE), Eurico da Silva (POR)
30 June 2022; 10:00	Report	Castro 4	Goals	three players 2	Oran; Referees: Andrija Đurašković (MNE), Eurico da Silva (POR)

=== Gold medal game ===
30 June 2022; 13:00	Report	Montenegro	8–9	Serbia	Oran; Referees: Ghislain Dehon (FRA), Sergio Jiménez (ESP)
30 June 2022; 13:00	Report	Score by quarters: 2–1, 2–4, 3–2, 1–2			Oran; Referees: Ghislain Dehon (FRA), Sergio Jiménez (ESP)
30 June 2022; 13:00	Report	L. Vukičević 3	Goals	Gavrilović, Kojić 2	Oran; Referees: Ghislain Dehon (FRA), Sergio Jiménez (ESP)

== Final standings ==
Rank	Team
1st place, gold medalist(s)	Serbia
2nd place, silver medalist(s)	Montenegro
3rd place, bronze medalist(s)	Spain
4	Italy
5	Greece
6	Slovenia
7	France
8	Turkey
9	Portugal
