= Spain at the 2022 Mediterranean Games =

- IOC code: ESP
- NOC: Spanish Olympic Committee
- Competitors: 282 in 23 sports
- Flag bearers: Pablo Abian; María Xiao (opening)
- Medals Ranked 5th: Gold 16 Silver 25 Bronze 25 Total 66

Mediterranean Games appearances (overview)
- 1951; 1955; 1959; 1963; 1967; 1971; 1975; 1979; 1983; 1987; 1991; 1993; 1997; 2001; 2005; 2009; 2013; 2018; 2022; 2026

Spain competed at the 2022 Mediterranean Games in Oran, Algeria from 25 June to 6 July 2022.

== Medal table ==
Medal	Name	Sport	Event	Date
Gold	Francisco Garrigos	Judo	Men's -60 kg	June 29
Gold	Pablo Abián	Badminton	Men's singles	June 30
Gold	Ai Tsunoda	Judo	Women's 70 kg	June 30
Gold	Jéssica Bouzas Maneiro; Guiomar Maristany	Tennis	Women's Doubles	June 30
Gold	Laura Redondo	Athletics	Women's Hammer Throw	June 30
Gold	Álvaro Robles	Table Tennis	Men's Singles	June 30
Gold	Leyre Fernández Infante	Archery	Women's Individual	July 1
Gold	Guiomar Maristany	Tennis	Women's Singles	July 1
Gold	Nikoloz Sherazadishvili	Judo	Men -100 kg	July 1
Gold	Lidón Muñoz	Swimming	Women's 50m Freestyle	July 1
Gold	Javier Pérez Polo	Taekwondo	Men's -68 kg	July 3
Gold	Spain women's national 3x3 basketball team: Natalia Rodríguez; Aina Ayuso; Carolina Guerrero; Helena Pueyo	3X3 Basketball	Women's tournament	July 3
Gold	Marcos Ruiz	Weightlifting	Men's 102 kg Snatch	July 4
Gold	Adrián Vicente	Taekwondo	Men's -58 kg	July 4
Gold	Spain women's national handball team: Carmen Campos; Esther Arrojería; Laura Hernández; Alba Chiara Spugnini; María Gomes; Ona Vegue; Elena Cuadrado; Kaba Gassama; June Loidi; Nicole Wiggins; Maddi Aalla; Sara Valero; Seynabou Mbengue; Paula María Valdivia; Clara Gasco; Elba Álvarez	Handball	Women's tournament	July 6
Gold	Spain men's national handball team: Roberto Rodríguez; Imanol Garciandia; Antonio Bazán; Pol Valera; Ian Tarrafeta; Miguel Martínez; Ander Izquierdo; Jose María Márquez; Sergey Hernández; Kauldi Odriozola; Josep Forqués; Jorge Serrano; Daniel Fernández; Jaime Gallego; Asier Nieto; Alberto Martín	Handball	Men's tournament	July 6
Silver	Luis Enrique Peñalver; Pablo Abián	Badminton	Men's Doubles	June 27
Silver	Levan Metreveli	Wrestling	Men's Freestyle 57 kg	June 27
Silver	Joel Plata	Artistic gymnastics	Men's All Around	June 28
Silver	Sara Díaz; Melania Homar	Boules	Petanque - Women's Doubles	June 29
Silver	Sara Díaz	Boules	Petanque - Women's Precision Shooting	June 29
Silver	Beatriz Corrales	Badminton	Women's Singles	June 30
Silver	Luis Enrique Peñalver	Badminton	Men's Singles	June 30
Silver	Cristina Cabaña	Judo	Women's -63 kg	June 30
Silver	Carlos López Montagud; Álvaro López San Martín	Tennis	Men's Doubles	June 30
Silver	Pablo Acha; Miguel Alvariño; Daniel Castro	Archery	Men's Team	July 1
Silver	Atenery Hernández	Weightlifting	Women's -49 kg Clean & Jerk	July 1
Silver	Atenery Hernández	Weightlifting	Women's -49 kg Snatch	July 1
Silver	Mario Molla Yanes; Carlos Quijada Roldán; Luis Domínguez Calonge; Miguel Martínez Novoa	Swimming	Men's 4 × 200 m Freestyle Relay	July 1
Silver	Carlos López Montagud	Tennis	Men's Singles	July 1
Silver	África Zamorano	Swimming	Women's 200 Backstroke	July 2
Silver	Joel Rodríguez	Sailing	Men's Laser	July 3
Silver	Adriana Cerezo Iglesias	Taekwondo	Women's -49 kg	July 3
Silver	Juan Segura	Swimming	Men's 50 Backstroke	July 3
Silver	Marcos Ruiz	Weightlifting	Men's 102 kg Clean & Jerk	July 4
Silver	Cecilia Castro	Taekwondo	Women's -67 kg	July 4
Silver	Daniel Quesada	Taekwondo	Men's -80 kg	July 4
Silver	África Zamorano; Marina García; Carla Hurtado; Lidón Muñoz	Swimming	Women's 4 × 100 m Medley Relay	July 4
Silver	Spain men's national volleyball team: Francisco Javier Iribarne; Víctor Rodriguez; Borja Ruiz; Jordi Ramon; Unai Larranaga; Jean Pascal Diedhiou; Jose María Giménez; Andrés Jesús Villena; Álvaro Gimeno; César Martín; David López; Miguel Ángel de Amo	Volleyball	Men's competition	July 4
Silver	Carlos Llavador	Fencing	Men's Foil Individual	July 5
Silver	Marina García	Swimming	Women's 200m Breaststroke	July 5
Bronze	Alba Pinilla	Karate	Women's 50 kg	June 26
Bronze	Laura Casabuena; Emma Fernández; Lorena Medina; Alba Petisco; Claudia Villalva	Artistic gymnastics	Women's team	June 26
Bronze	Lydia Pérez	Wrestling	Women's Freestyle 62 kg	June 28
Bronze	Ana Isabel Pérez	Judo	Women's 52 kg	June 29
Bronze	Marina Rueda	Wrestling	Women's Freestyle 53 kg	June 29
Bronze	Spain men's national water polo team: Xavier Teclas; Joan Villamayor; Gerard Gil; Daniel Ivaylov; Marc Frigola; Hugo Castro; Robert López; Javier Ibáñez; Jan Pérez; Luca de la Cruz; Javier Otero; Biel Gomila; Didac García	Water Polo	Men's competition	June 30
Bronze	Marta López del Árbol	Boxing	Women 48 kg	June 30
Bronze	Laura Fuertes	Boxing	Women 50 kg	June 30
Bronze	Gazimagomed Jalidov	Boxing	Men 81 kg	June 30
Bronze	Alfonso Urquiza	Judo	Men -81 kg	June 30
Bronze	Maria Xiao	Table Tennis	Women's Singles	June 30
Bronze	Elia Canales; Miguel Alvariño	Archery	Mixed Doubles	July 1
Bronze	Jéssica Bouzas Maneiro	Tennis	Women's Singles	July 1
Bronze	Tristani Mosakhlishvili	Judo	Men -90 kg	July 1
Bronze	Alba Vázquez Ruiz	Swimming	Women's 400m Individual Medley	July 1
Bronze	Alex Castejón	Swimming	Men's 200m Breastsroke	July 1
Bronze	Sandra Alonso	Cycling	Women's Road Race	July 2
Bronze	Tessy Ebosele	Athletics	Women's Triple Jump	July 2
Bronze	Iñaki Bravo	Fencing	Men's Sabre Individual	July 3
Bronze	Daniel Rodríguez	Athletics	Men's 200m	July 3
Bronze	Enrique Llopis	Athletics	Men's 110m hurdles	July 3
Bronze	Spain men's national 3x3 basketball team: Unai Mendicote; Guillem Arcos; Isaac Mayo; Pablo González	3X3 Basketball	Men's tournament	July 3
Bronze	María Teresa Díaz	Fencing	Women's Foil Individual	July 5
Bronze	Luis Domínguez	Swimming	Men's 200m Freestyle	July 5
Bronze	Carmen Weiler	Swimming	Women's 100m Backstroke	July 5

== Archery ==
Men

Athlete	Event	Ranking round		Round of 64	Round of 32	Round of 16	Quarterfinals	Semifinals	Final / BM	
Athlete	Event	Score	Seed	Opposition Score	Opposition Score	Opposition Score	Opposition Score	Opposition Score	Opposition Score	Rank
Pablo Acha	Individual	643	9	Bye	Karageorgiou (GRE); W 6-0	Ravnikar (SLO); L 7-3	did not advance			
Miguel Alvariño	Individual	653	6	Bye	Hocine (ALG); W 6-0	Paoli (ITA); W 7-1	Musolesi (ITA); L 6-4	did not advance		
Daniel Castro	Individual	642	10	Bye	Hammed (TUN); W 6-0	Fichet (FRA); L 6-4	did not advance			
Pablo Acha; Miguel Alvariño; Daniel Castro	Team	1938	3	—N/a		Bye	Portugal (POR); W 6-0	Turkey (TUR); W 6-2	France (FRA); L 6-2	2nd place, silver medalist(s)

Women

Athlete	Event	Ranking round		Round of 32	Round of 16	Quarterfinals	Semifinals	Final / BM	
Athlete	Event	Score	Seed	Opposition Score	Opposition Score	Opposition Score	Opposition Score	Opposition Score	Rank
Elia Canales	Individual	642	4	Bye	Villard (FRA); W 6-4	Başaran (TUR); L 6-4	did not advance		
Leyre Fernández	Individual	635	8	Brkić (CRO); W 7-1	Andreoli (ITA); W 6-2	Anagöz (TUR); W 7-1	Başaran (TUR); W 6-5	Boari (ITA); W 7-1	1st place, gold medalist(s)
Irati Unamunzaga	Individual	596	20	Villard (FRA); L 6-5	did not advance				
Elia Canales; Leyre Fernández; Irati Unamunzaga	Team	1873	4	—N/a		France (FRA); L 4-5	did not advance		

Mixed

Athlete	Event	Ranking round		Round of 16	Quarterfinals	Semifinals	Final / BM	
Athlete	Event	Score	Seed	Opposition Score	Opposition Score	Opposition Score	Opposition Score	Rank
Miguel Alvariño; Elia Canales	Mixed team	1295	4	Bye	France (FRA); W 5-4	Turkey (TUR); L 5-4	Greece (GRE); W 6-2	3rd place, bronze medalist(s)

== Artistic gymnastics ==
Spain competed in artistic gymnastics.

== Athletics ==
Key

- Note – Ranks given for track events are within the athlete's heat only
- Q = Qualified for the next round
- q = Qualified for the next round as a fastest loser or, in field events, by position without achieving the qualifying target
- NR = National record
- N/A = Round not applicable for the event
- Bye = Athlete not required to compete in round

Men
Track & road events

Athlete	Event	Semifinal		Final	
Athlete	Event	Result	Rank	Result	Rank
Sergio López	100 m	10.38	5 Q	10.33	5
Daniel Rodríguez	200 m	20.86	4 Q	20.78	3rd place, bronze medalist(s)
Iñaki Cañal	400 m	46.31	5 Q	46.44	5
Alberto Guerrero	800 m	1:47.82	9	did not advance	
Abderrahman El Khayami	1500 m	—N/a		3:45.25	9
Daniel Cisneros	110 m hurdles	13.53	5 Q	13.98	7
Enrique Llopis	110 m hurdles	13.52	4 Q	13.47	3rd place, bronze medalist(s)
Aleix Porras	400 m hurdles	51.90	10	did not advance	
Alejandro Quijada	3000 m steeplechase	—N/a		8:36.69	9

Field events

Athlete	Event	Final	
Athlete	Event	Result	Rank
Isidro Leyva	Pole vault	5.45	5
Jaime Guerra	Long jump	7.60	6
Diego Casas	Discus throw	54.80	12
Alberto González	Hammer throw	66.49	11

Men
Track & road events

Athlete	Event	Semifinal		Final	
Athlete	Event	Result	Rank	Result	Rank
Carmen Marco	100 m	11.56	4 Q	11.48	4
Eva Santidrián	200 m	23.56 PB	4 Q	23.33 PB	5
Blanca Hervas	400 m	—N/a		54.23	6
Daniela García	800 m	2:05.92	7 Q	2:03.45	5
Marina Martínez	1500 m	—N/a		4:14.04	4
Marta García	1500 m	—N/a		DNS	-
Marta García	5000 m	—N/a		DNS	-
Aitana Radsma	110 m hurdles	13.39	8	did not advance	
Carla García	400 m hurdles	57.30	6 Q	56.83	6
Clara Viñaras	3000 m steeplechase	—N/a		10:12.34	9

Field events

Athlete	Event	Final	
Athlete	Event	Result	Rank
Irati Mitxelena	Long jump	6.03	12
Tessy Ebosele	Triple jump	13.63	3rd place, bronze medalist(s)
Osarumen Odeh	Hammer throw	65.05	5
Laura Redondo	Hammer throw	69.97	1st place, gold medalist(s)

== Badminton ==
Spain competed in badminton.

== Basketball ==
Spain won the bronze medal in the men's tournament and the gold medal in the women's tournament.

Athlete	Event	Group matches				Quarterfinals	Semifinals	Final / BM	
Athlete	Event	Opposition Score	Opposition Score	Opposition Score	Rank	Opposition Score	Opposition Score	Opposition Score	Rank
Guillem Arcos; Isaac Mayo; Unai Mendicote; Pablo González	Men's Tournament	(Portugal) Portugal; W 14–12	(Slovenia) Slovenia; W 21–5	—N/a	1	(Algeria) Algeria; W 21–18	(Serbia) Serbia; L 13–21	(Turkey) Turkey; W 16–13	3rd place, bronze medalist(s)
Aina Ayuso; Carolina Guerrero; Natalia Rodríguez; Helena Pueyo	Women's Tournament	(Turkey) Turkey; W 18–15	(Greece) Greece; W 21–13	(Slovenia) Slovenia; W 16–12	1	(Tunisia) Slovenia; W 22–16	(Italy) Italy; W 16–11	(France) France; W 12–11	1st place, gold medalist(s)

== Boules ==
Spain competed in boules.

Lyonnaise

Athlete	Event	Heats				Quarterfinals	Semifinals	Final / BM	
Athlete	Event	Heat 1	Heat 2	Total	Rank	Opposition Score	Opposition Score	Opposition Score	Rank
Daniel Guillen	Men's precision throw	3	11	14	12	did not advance			
Cristina Soler	Women's precision throw	5	13	18	8 Q	Ozturk (TUR); L 16-5	did not advance		

Pétanque

Athlete	Event	Preliminary round				Quarterfinals	Semifinals	Final / BM	
Athlete	Event	Round 1	Rank	Round 2	Rank	Opposition Score	Opposition Score	Opposition Score	Rank
Jesús Escarcho	Men's precision throw	38	4 Q	Bye		Akbas (TUR); W 41-32	Bougriba (TUN); L 34-44	Ouaghlissi (ALG); L 21-40	4
Sara Díaz	Women's precision throw	24	3 q	59	3 Q	—N/a	Disidoro (FRA); W 37-18	Beji Ep Mattoussi (TUN); L 30-37	2nd place, silver medalist(s)

Athlete	Event	Group stage		Quarterfinals	Semifinals	Final / BM	
Athlete	Event	Opposition Score	Rank	Opposition Score	Opposition Score	Opposition Score	Rank
José Alberto Andreu; Jesús Escarcho	Men's doubles	Monaco (MON) W 13–1; Italy (ITA) W 10–3	1 Q	Tunisia (TUN); W 13–11	Morocco (MAR); L 13–3	Italy (ITA); L 13–11	4
Sara Díaz; Melania Holmar	Women's doubles	Turkey (TUR) W 12–4; France (FRA) W 9–6; Italy (ITA) W 13–3	1 Q	—N/a	Algeria (ALG); W 13–3	Tunisia (TUN); L 13–6	2nd place, silver medalist(s)

== Boxing ==
Spain competed in boxing.

Men

Athlete	Event	Round of 16	Quarterfinals	Semifinals	Final	
Athlete	Event	Opposition Result	Opposition Result	Opposition Result	Opposition Result	Rank
Martín Molina	Flyweight -52kg	Ismail (EGY); W 0-2	Serra (ITA); L 1-2	did not advance		
Antonio Barrul	Featherweight -57kg	Bye	Çiftçi (TUR); L 1-2	did not advance		
José Quiles	Lightweight -60kg	Bye	Benlaribi (ALG); L 0-3	did not advance		
Miguel Cuadrado	Middleweight -75kg	Nemouchi (ALG); L 0-3	did not advance			
Gazimagomed Jalidov	Light heavyweight -81kg	Commey (ITA); W 0-3	Dananovic (BIH); WRSC	Mironchikov (SRB); L 0-3	did not advance	3rd place, bronze medalist(s)
Enmanuel Reyes Pla	Heavyweight -91kg	Bye	Mouhiidine (ITA); L 0-3	did not advance		

Women

Athlete	Event	Round of 16	Quarterfinals	Semifinals	Final	
Athlete	Event	Opposition Result	Opposition Result	Opposition Result	Opposition Result	Rank
Marta López del Árbol	Minimumweight -48kg	Bye	Mouttaki (MAR); W 0-3	Boualam (ALG); L 0-3	did not advance	3rd place, bronze medalist(s)
Laura Fuertes	Light flyweight -50kg	—N/a	Bye	Sorrentino (ITA); L 0-3	did not advance	3rd place, bronze medalist(s)
Mamen Madueño	Bantamweight -54kg	Bye	Ayyad (EGY); L ABD	did not advance		

== Cycling ==
Spain competed in cycling.

Men

Athlete	Event	Time	Rank
Rodrigo Álvarez	Men's road race	3:15:34	17
Francesc Bennassar	Men's road race	3:15:34	18
Xabier Berasategi	Men's road race	3:15:35	37
Pablo García Frances	Men's road race	DNF	-
Mikel Retegi Goñi	Men's road race	DNF	-
Fernando Tercero	Men's road race	DNF	-
Enekoitz Azparren	Men's road race	3:15:35	39
Enekoitz Azparren	Men's time trial	33:29.24	6
Marcel Camprubí	Men's road race	3:37:06	61
Marcel Camprubí	Men's time trial	36:58.74	17

Women

Athlete	Event	Time	Rank
Sandra Alonso	Women's road race	1:58:24	3rd place, bronze medalist(s)
Sandra Alonso	Women's time trial	26:39.88	9
Mireia Benito	Women's road race	1:58:33	23
Mireia Benito	Women's time trial	26:25.28	8
Inés Cantera	Women's road race	DNS	-
Alicia González	Women's road race	1:58:24	11
Sara Martín	Women's road race	1:58:24	15
Lourdes Oyarbide	Women's road race	1:58:50	25

== Fencing ==
Spain competed in fencing.

Men

Athlete	Event	Group stage		Round of 16	Quarterfinal	Semifinal	Final / BM	
Athlete	Event	Pool Scores	Rank	Opposition Score	Opposition Score	Opposition Score	Opposition Score	Rank
Ángel Fabregat	Individual épée	Kraria (ALG) L 2-5; Taliotis (CYP) L 3-4; Ekenler (TUR) L 4-5; Cuomo (ITA) W 2-5; Kraria (FRA) L 3-5	5 Q	Frazao (POR); W 15-11	Elsayed (EGY); L 12-15	did not advance		
Carlos Llavador	Individual foil	Files (CRO) W 5-1; Essam (EGY) W 5-2; Elice (FRA) W 1-5; Luperi (ITA) W 3-5; Fellah (ALG) W 5-0	1 Q	Bye	Elice (FRA); W 11-15	Elice (EGY); W 15-12	Cuk (SRB); L 15-9	2nd place, silver medalist(s)
Iñaki Bravo	Individual sabre	Saad (ALG) W 5-1; Zavirsek Zorz (SLO) W 5-1; Seitz (FRA) L 1-5; Repetti (ITA) W 4-5; Moataz (EGY) W 5-2; Ferjani (TUN) W 5-2	3 Q	Pogu (FRA); W 15-12	Repetti (ITA); W 15-13	Nuccio (ITA); L 15-11	did not advance	3rd place, bronze medalist(s)

Women

Athlete	Event	Group stage		Round of 16	Quarterfinal	Semifinal	Final / BM	
Athlete	Event	Pool Scores	Rank	Opposition Score	Opposition Score	Opposition Score	Opposition Score	Rank
Sara Fernández	Individual épée	Mavrikiou (CYP) W 3-4; Zeboudj (ALG) W 1-5; Louis-Marie (FRA) L 2-4; Foietta (ITA) L 1-3	5 Q	Gunac (TUR); W 14-12	Foietta (ITA); L 10-15	did not advance		
María Teresa Díaz	Individual foil	Mebarki (ALG) W 1-5; Oliveira (POR) W 5-2; Calissi (ITA) L 2-5; Marechal (FRA) W 5-2	1 Q	Bye	Batini (ITA); W 15-10	Patru (FRA); L 15-9	did not advance	3rd place, bronze medalist(s)
María Mariño	Individual foil	Isbir (TUR) W 5-1; Zebboudj (ALG) W 5-0; Batini (ITA) W 5-3; Recher (FRA) L 3-5	1 Q	Bye	Calissi (ITA); L 13-14	did not advance		
Lucía Martín-Portugués	Individual sabre	Daghfous (TUN) W 5-1; Passaro (ITA) W 4-5; Vongsavady (FRA) L 5-4; Mohammed Belkbir (ALG) W 5-3; Kehli (ALG) W 5-4; Lembach (FRA) L 3-5	3 Q	Bye	Mormile (ITA); L 6-15	did not advance		
Araceli Navarro	Individual sabre	Aime (FRA) L 4-5; Gargano (ITA) W 5-3; Mormile (ITA) L 2-5; Boudiaf (ALG) L 4-5; Shchukla (TUR) L 2-5	5	did not advance				

== Football ==
Summary

Team	Event	Group stage				Semifinal	Final / BM	
Team	Event	Opposition Score	Opposition Score	Opposition Score	Rank	Opposition Score	Opposition Score	Rank
Spain U18 men's	Men's tournament	Algeria; L 0–1	France; D 1–1	Morocco; D 1–1	3	did not advance		

Group play

Pos	Team	Pld	W	D	L	GF	GA	GD	Pts	Qualification
1	France	3	2	1	0	5	3	+2	7	Semifinals
2	Morocco	3	1	1	1	3	2	+1	4	Semifinals
3	Algeria (H)	3	1	0	2	3	5	−2	3	
4	Spain	3	0	2	1	2	3	−1	2	

Source: Oran 2022
(H) Hosts
26 June 2022
17:00

Spain	0–1	Algeria
	Report	Puch-Herrantz 27'

Abdelkrim Kerroum Stadium, Sig
Referee: Evangelos Manouchos (Greece)

28 June 2022
20:00

Spain	1–1	France
Gómez 47'	Report	Dimi 55'

Ahmed Zabana Stadium, Oran
Referee: Zorbay Küçük (Turkey)

30 June 2022
20:00

Morocco	1–1	Spain
Khalifi 23' (pen.)	Report	Rodríguez 12'

Abdelkrim Kerroum Stadium, Sig
Referee: Bruno José Costa (Portugal)

== Handball ==
Summary

Team	Event	Group stage					Semifinal	Final / BM / Pl.	
Team	Event	Opposition Score	Opposition Score	Opposition Score	Opposition Score	Rank	Opposition Score	Opposition Score	Rank
Spain men's	Men's tournament	Turkey; W 46–19	North Macedonia; W 31–22	Greece; W 46–21	Algeria; W 31–19	1 Q	Serbia; W 42–38	Egypt; W 28–27	1st place, gold medalist(s)
Spain women's	Women's tournament	Algeria; W 26-20	Tunisia; W 28-21	Croatia; W 31–23	—N/a	1 Q	Portugal; W 26–24	Croatia; W 29–25	1st place, gold medalist(s)

=== Men's tournament ===
Group play

Pos	Team	Pld	W	D	L	GF	GA	GD	Pts	Qualification
1	Spain	4	4	0	0	154	81	+73	8	Semifinals
2	North Macedonia	4	2	1	1	116	98	+18	5	Semifinals
3	Algeria (H)	4	2	1	1	110	107	+3	5	Fifth place game
4	Turkey	4	1	0	3	96	135	−39	2	Seventh place game
5	Greece	4	0	0	4	93	148	−55	0	Ninth place game

Source: Oran 2022
Rules for classification: 1) Points; 2) Head-to-head points; 3) Head-to-head goal difference; 4) Head-to-head goals scored; 5) Goal difference; 6) Goals scored; 7) Draw.
(H) Hosts

28 June 2022; 20:00	Spain	46–19	Turkey	24 February Indoor Hall, Arzew; Referees: Hamidi, Belkhiri (ALG)
28 June 2022; 20:00	Serrano 7	(26–7)	Durmaz, Pehlivan 4	24 February Indoor Hall, Arzew; Referees: Hamidi, Belkhiri (ALG)
28 June 2022; 20:00	2× (suspension)	Report	1× (yellow card) 4× (suspension)	24 February Indoor Hall, Arzew; Referees: Hamidi, Belkhiri (ALG)

30 June 2022; 17:00	North Macedonia	22–31	Spain	24 February Indoor Hall, Arzew; Referees: Sando Kovačević, Jakovljević (SRB)
30 June 2022; 17:00	Serafimov 8	(8–14)	three players 4	24 February Indoor Hall, Arzew; Referees: Sando Kovačević, Jakovljević (SRB)
30 June 2022; 17:00	2× (yellow card) 3× (suspension)	Report	3× (suspension)	24 February Indoor Hall, Arzew; Referees: Sando Kovačević, Jakovljević (SRB)

1 July 2022; 17:00	Spain	46–21	Greece	24 February Indoor Hall, Arzew; Referees: Rodrigues, Pinherio (POR)
1 July 2022; 17:00	Folqués, Odriozola 6	(24–10)	three players 4	24 February Indoor Hall, Arzew; Referees: Rodrigues, Pinherio (POR)
1 July 2022; 17:00	2× (suspension)	Report	2× (suspension)	24 February Indoor Hall, Arzew; Referees: Rodrigues, Pinherio (POR)

2 July 2022; 19:15	Algeria	19–31	Spain	24 February Indoor Hall, Arzew; Referees: Sá, Sá (POR)
2 July 2022; 19:15	Saker 4	(7–22)	Márquez 5	24 February Indoor Hall, Arzew; Referees: Sá, Sá (POR)
2 July 2022; 19:15	1× (yellow card) 2× (suspension)	Report	2× (suspension)	24 February Indoor Hall, Arzew; Referees: Sá, Sá (POR)

Semifinal

4 July 2022; 18:00	Spain	42–38	Serbia	Miloud Hadefi Complex Omnisport Arena, Bir El Djir; Referees: Belkhiri, Hamidi (ALG)
4 July 2022; 18:00	three players 6	(22–21)	three players 7	Miloud Hadefi Complex Omnisport Arena, Bir El Djir; Referees: Belkhiri, Hamidi (ALG)
4 July 2022; 18:00	1× (yellow card) 1× (suspension)	Report	2× (yellow card) 5× (suspension)	Miloud Hadefi Complex Omnisport Arena, Bir El Djir; Referees: Belkhiri, Hamidi (ALG)

Gold medal game

6 July 2022; 16:30	Egypt	27–28	Spain	Miloud Hadefi Complex Omnisport Arena, Bir El Djir; Referees: Belkhiri, Hamidi (ALG)
6 July 2022; 16:30	Sanad 7	(16–13)	Tarrafeta 10	Miloud Hadefi Complex Omnisport Arena, Bir El Djir; Referees: Belkhiri, Hamidi (ALG)
6 July 2022; 16:30	3× (suspension)	Report	1× (yellow card) 5× (suspension)	Miloud Hadefi Complex Omnisport Arena, Bir El Djir; Referees: Belkhiri, Hamidi (ALG)

=== Women's tournament ===
Group play

Pos	Team	Pld	W	D	L	GF	GA	GD	Pts	Qualification
1	Spain	3	3	0	0	85	64	+21	6	Semifinals
2	Croatia	3	2	0	1	82	78	+4	4	Semifinals
3	Tunisia	3	1	0	2	67	75	−8	2	Fifth place game
4	Algeria (H)	3	0	0	3	60	77	−17	0	Seventh place game

Source: Oran 2022
Rules for classification: 1) Points; 2) Head-to-head points; 3) Head-to-head goal difference; 4) Head-to-head goals scored; 5) Goal difference; 6) Goals scored; 7) Draw.
(H) Hosts

30 June 2022; 17:15	Spain	26–20	Algeria	El Hachemí Hantaz Hall, Aïn El Turk; Referees: Ilievski, Ilievski (MKD)
30 June 2022; 17:15	Valdivia 7	(14–9)	five players 3	El Hachemí Hantaz Hall, Aïn El Turk; Referees: Ilievski, Ilievski (MKD)
30 June 2022; 17:15	1× (yellow card) 3× (suspension)	Report	3× (suspension)	El Hachemí Hantaz Hall, Aïn El Turk; Referees: Ilievski, Ilievski (MKD)

1 July 2022; 19:15	Spain	28–21	Tunisia	El Hachemí Hantaz Hall, Aïn El Turk; Referees: Jakovljević, Kovačević (SRB)
1 July 2022; 19:15	Arrojeria 7	(11–8)	Bouri 4	El Hachemí Hantaz Hall, Aïn El Turk; Referees: Jakovljević, Kovačević (SRB)
1 July 2022; 19:15	1× (yellow card) 3× (suspension)	Report	3× (suspension)	El Hachemí Hantaz Hall, Aïn El Turk; Referees: Jakovljević, Kovačević (SRB)

2 July 2022; 19:15	Croatia	23–31	Spain	El Hachemí Hantaz Hall, Aïn El Turk; Referees: Hamidi, Belkhiri (ALG)
2 July 2022; 19:15	Posavec 8	(12–18)	Campos 7	El Hachemí Hantaz Hall, Aïn El Turk; Referees: Hamidi, Belkhiri (ALG)
2 July 2022; 19:15	2× (yellow card) 3× (suspension)	Report	3× (yellow card) 3× (suspension)	El Hachemí Hantaz Hall, Aïn El Turk; Referees: Hamidi, Belkhiri (ALG)

Semifinal

4 July 2022; 10:30	Spain	26–24	Portugal	Miloud Hadefi Complex Omnisport Arena, Bir El Djir; Referees: Farsi, Kahouadji (ALG)
4 July 2022; 10:30	Campos 10	(12–13)	Minciuna 6	Miloud Hadefi Complex Omnisport Arena, Bir El Djir; Referees: Farsi, Kahouadji (ALG)
4 July 2022; 10:30	1× (yellow card) 4× (suspension)	Report	1× (yellow card) 4× (suspension)	Miloud Hadefi Complex Omnisport Arena, Bir El Djir; Referees: Farsi, Kahouadji (ALG)

Gold medal game

6 July 2022; 14:00	Spain	29–25	Croatia	Miloud Hadefi Complex Omnisport Arena, Bir El Djir; Referees: Sá, Sá (POR)
6 July 2022; 14:00	Campos 9	(17–13)	Pavlović 9	Miloud Hadefi Complex Omnisport Arena, Bir El Djir; Referees: Sá, Sá (POR)
6 July 2022; 14:00	3× (suspension)	Report	2× (yellow card) 3× (suspension)	Miloud Hadefi Complex Omnisport Arena, Bir El Djir; Referees: Sá, Sá (POR)

== Judo ==
Spain competed in judo.

Men

Athlete	Event	Round of 16	Quarterfinals	Semifinals	Repechage 1	Repechage 2	Final / BM	
Athlete	Event	Opposition Result	Opposition Result	Opposition Result	Opposition Result	Opposition Result	Opposition Result	Rank
Francisco Garrigós	−60 kg	Bye	Yagoubi (ALG); W 10–0	Bassou (MAR); W 10-0	Bye		Dhouibi (TUN); W 10–0	1st place, gold medalist(s)
Alberto Gaitero	−66 kg	Bye	Piras (ITA); L 1–0	did not advance	Cherrad (ALG); W 1–10	Gobert (FRA); L 0–10	did not advance	
Alfonso Urquiza	−81 kg	Bye	Benazoug (ALG); W 0–10	Bedel (ITA); L 0–10	Bye		Vučurević (BIH); W 0–1	3rd place, bronze medalist(s)
Tristani Mosakhlishvili	−90 kg	Brašnjović (SRB); W 10-0	Damier (FRA); W 10-0	Zgank (TUR); L 0-10	Bye		Pirelli (ITA); W 10-0	3rd place, bronze medalist(s)
Nikoloz Sherazadishvili	-100 kg	Bye	Şişmanlar (TUR); W 11-0	Agbegnenou (TUR); W 10-0	Bye		Bouamar (ALG); W 11-1	1st place, gold medalist(s)
Irinel Chelaru	+100 kg	Vujičić (BIH); W 1-0	Belrekaa (ALG); L 0-10	Did not advance	Bye	Esseryry (TUR); L 0-10	did not advance	

Women

Athlete	Event	Round of 16	Quarterfinals	Semifinals	Repechage 1	Repechage 2	Final / BM	
Athlete	Event	Opposition Result	Opposition Result	Opposition Result	Opposition Result	Opposition Result	Opposition Result	Rank
Mireia Lapuerta Comas	−48 kg	Bye	Štangar (SLO); W 10-0	Nikolić (SRB); L 10-0	—N/a		Bedioui (TUN); L 1-0	5
Ana Pérez Box	−52 kg	Bye	Devictor (FRA); W 10-0	Krasniqi (KOS); L 0-1	—N/a		Aissahine (ALG); W 10-0	3rd place, bronze medalist(s)
María Ruíz	−57 kg	Bye	Halata (ALG); L 10-0	did not advance	—N/a	Loxha (KOS); L 0-10	did not advance	
Cristina Cabaña	−63 kg	Bye	D'Isanto (ITA); W 0-10	Harachi (MAR); W 0-1	Bye		Fazliu (KOS); L 0-1	2nd place, silver medalist(s)
Ai Tsunoda	−70 kg	Bye	Samardžić (BIH); W 1-0	Pogačnik (TUN); W 10-0	Bye		Landolsi (TUN); W 10-0	1st place, gold medalist(s)
Lucía Pérez	−78 kg	Yılmaz (TUR); L 0-10	did not advance					
Nisrin Bousbaa	+78 kg	Tavano (ITA); L 0-10	did not advance					

== Karate ==
Men

Athlete	Event	Round of 16	Quarterfinals	Semifinals	Repechage	Final / BM	
Athlete	Event	Opposition Result	Opposition Result	Opposition Result	Opposition Result	Opposition Result	Rank
Alex Ortíz de Zarate	−60 kg	Jina (MAR); L 2-5	did not advance				
Samy Ennkhaili	−67 kg	Lotfy (EGY); L 3-0	did not advance				
Carlos Bargados	−75 kg	Abdelaziz (EGY); L 4-6	did not advance		Busá (ITA); L 2-5	did not advance	
José Rafael Ibáñez	−84 kg	Slimani (TUN); W 1-1	Martini (ITA); W 2-1	Badawy (EGY); L 1-4	—N/a	Aktaş (TUR); L 3-2	5th
Babacar Seck	+84 kg	Bye	Sriti (MAR); L 11-3	did not advance			

Women

Athlete	Event	Round of 16	Quarterfinals	Semifinals	Repechage	Final / BM	
Athlete	Event	Opposition Result	Opposition Result	Opposition Result	Opposition Result	Opposition Result	Rank
Alba Pinilla	−50 kg	Ouikene (ALG); L 0-0	did not advance		Leal (POR); W 4-1	Haberl (SLO); W 4-4	3rd place, bronze medalist(s)
Carlota Fernández	−55 kg	Brunori (ITA); L 0-3	did not advance				
María Espinosa	−61 kg	Lenard (CRO); W 1-2	Mangiacapra (ITA); L 0-1	did not advance			
Adriana Gil	−68 kg	Brouk (MAR); L 0-0	did not advance				
María Torres	+68 kg	Bye	Jovanović (MNE); L 0-5	did not advance	Okila (EGY); W 3-1	Jemi (TUN); L 3-2	5th

== Sailing ==
Spain competed in sailing.

== Shooting ==
Spain competed in shooting.

== Table Tennis ==
Spain competed in table tennis.

== Taekwondo ==
Spain competed in Taekwondo.

Men

Athlete	Event	Round of 32	Round of 16	Quarterfinals	Semifinals	Final	
Athlete	Event	Opposition Result	Opposition Result	Opposition Result	Opposition Result	Opposition Result	Rank
Adrián Vicente	58 kg	—N/a	Bye	Saidi Attoui (ALG); W 28^{PTG}–8	Domen Molj (SLO); W 41–9	Omar Lakehal (MAR); W 26–12	1st place, gold medalist(s)
Javier Pérez	68 kg	Bye	Souleyman Alaphilippe (FRA); W 22–6	Dennis Baretta (ITA); W 25^{PTG}–4	Konstantinos Chamalidis (GRE); W 16–3	Hakan Reçber (TUR); W 25–24	1st place, gold medalist(s)
Daniel Quesada	80 kg	—N/a	Bye	Hüseyin Kartal (TUR); W 32–21	Apostolos Telikostoglou (GRE); W 13–1	Seif Eissa (EGY); L 5–7	2nd place, silver medalist(s)
Raúl Martínez	+80 kg	—N/a	Ahmad Mohamed (EGY); L 5–14	did not advance			

Women

Athlete	Event	Round of 16	Quarterfinals	Semifinals	Final	
Athlete	Event	Opposition Result	Opposition Result	Opposition Result	Opposition Result	Rank
Adriana Cerezo	49 kg	Bye	Nezha Elaasal (MAR); W 26^{PTG}–4	Shahd El-Hosseiny (EGY); W 5–1	Merve Dinçel (TUR); L 1–7	2nd place, silver medalist(s)
Cecilia Castro	67 kg	Bye	Mervenur Evci (TUR); W 19–5	Magda Wiet-Hénin (FRA); W 19–15	Matea Jelić (CRO); L 7–8	2nd place, silver medalist(s)
Tania Castiñeira	+67 kg	Bye	Nika Petanjek (CRO); L 4–7	did not advance		

== Tennis ==
Spain competed in tennis.

Men

Athlete	Event	Round of 32	Round of 16	Quarterfinals	Semifinals	Final / BM	
Athlete	Event	Opposition Score	Opposition Score	Opposition Score	Opposition Score	Opposition Score	Rank
Carlos López Montagud	Singles	Muedini (ALB); W 0–6, 1-6	Asciak (MLT); W 2–6, 1-6	Catarina (MON); W 2–6, 6–3, 3-6	Moundir (MAR); W 6–3, 3–6, 0-6	Passaro (ITA)	2nd place, silver medalist(s)
Álvaro López San Martín	Singles	Premzl (SLO); W 6–4, 6-4	Ouakaa (TUN); W 6–0, 6-1	Benchetrit (MAR); L 4–6, 6-7	did not advance		
Carlos López Montagud; Álvaro López San Martín	Doubles	—N/a	Bye	Elyased/Maamoun (EGY); W 4–6, 2-6	Benchetrit/Moundir (MAR); W 7–6, 5–7, 0-1	Arnaldi/Passaro (ITA); L 6–2, 6-3	2nd place, silver medalist(s)

Women

Athlete	Event	Round of 32	Round of 16	Quarterfinals	Semifinals	Final / BM	
Athlete	Event	Opposition Score	Opposition Score	Opposition Score	Opposition Score	Opposition Score	Rank
Jéssica Bouzas Maneiro	Singles	Bye	Alves Campino (POR); W 4–6, 2-6	Kabbaj (MAR); W 7–6. 6-3	Brancaccio (ITA); L 7–5, 4–6, 3-6	Bechri (TUN); W W/o	3rd place, bronze medalist(s)
Guiomar Maristany	Singles	Bye	Benaïssa (ALG); W 2–6, 2-6	Zantedeschi (ITA); W 1–6, 0-6	Bechri (TUN); W 0–6, 1R-3	Brancaccio (ITA); W 2–6,7-5,2-6	1st place, gold medalist(s)
Jéssica Bouzas Maneiro; Guiomar Maristany	Doubles	—N/a	Bye	Bekrar/Ibbou (ALG); W 5–7, 6-3	Bechri/Ben Hassen (TUN); W 4–6, 3-6	Curmi/Pellicano (MLT); W 6–3, 6-2	1st place, gold medalist(s)

== Volleyball ==
Spain competed in volleyball.

Team	Event	Group stage				Quarter-final	Semifinal	Final / BM / Pl.	
Team	Event	Opposition Score	Opposition Score	Opposition Score	Rank	Opposition Score	Opposition Score	Opposition Score	Rank
Spain men's	Men's tournament	Croatia; L 1-3	Tunisia; W 3-0	Serbia; W 3-2	2	Egypt; W 3-2	France; W 3-0	Croatia; L 0-3	2nd place, silver medalist(s)
Spain women's	Women's tournament	Italy; L 0-3	Algeria; W 3-0	Turkey; L 1-3	3	Greece; W 3-0	Italy; L 0-3	Serbia; L 2-3	4

== Water polo ==
Summary

Team	Event	Group stage				Semifinal	Final / BM / Pl.	
Team	Event	Opposition Score	Opposition Score	Opposition Score	Rank	Opposition Score	Opposition Score	Rank
Spain men's	Men's tournament	Greece; W 12–11	Italy; W 14–8	Turkey; W 15–8	1 Q	Montenegro; L 9–10	Italy; W 16–8	3rd place, bronze medalist(s)

Group play

Pos	Team	Pld	W	D	L	GF	GA	GD	Pts	Qualification
1	Spain	3	3	0	0	41	27	+14	6	Semifinals
2	Italy	3	2	0	1	31	22	+9	4	Semifinals
3	Greece	3	1	0	2	38	29	+9	2	Fifth place game
4	Turkey	3	0	0	3	17	49	−32	0	Seventh place game

Source: Oran 2022

24 June 2022; 16:00	Report	Greece	11–12	Spain	Oran; Referees: Igor Virijević (SRB), Ghislain Dehon (FRA)
24 June 2022; 16:00	Report	Score by quarters: 2–2, 2–4, 4–2, 3–4			Oran; Referees: Igor Virijević (SRB), Ghislain Dehon (FRA)
24 June 2022; 16:00	Report	four players 2	Goals	López 5	Oran; Referees: Igor Virijević (SRB), Ghislain Dehon (FRA)

26 June 2022; 16:00	Report	Spain	14–8	Italy	Oran; Referees: Igor Virijević (SRB), Andrija Đurašković (MNE)
26 June 2022; 16:00	Report	Score by quarters: 2–1, 3–3, 5–2, 4–2			Oran; Referees: Igor Virijević (SRB), Andrija Đurašković (MNE)
26 June 2022; 16:00	Report	Hugo Castro 4	Goals	Nenni 3	Oran; Referees: Igor Virijević (SRB), Andrija Đurašković (MNE)

28 June 2022; 16:00	Report	Spain	15–8	Turkey	Oran; Referees: Matevž Homovec (SLO), Ghislain Dehon (FRA)
28 June 2022; 16:00	Report	Score by quarters: 6–3, 1–2, 4–2, 4–1			Oran; Referees: Matevž Homovec (SLO), Ghislain Dehon (FRA)
28 June 2022; 16:00	Report	Frigola, Gil 3	Goals	Caner 5	Oran; Referees: Matevž Homovec (SLO), Ghislain Dehon (FRA)

Semifinal

29 June 2022; 15:00	Report	Spain	9–10	Montenegro	Oran; Referees: Arnaldo Petronilli (ITA), Igor Virijević (SRB)
29 June 2022; 15:00	Report	Score by quarters: 2–2, 3–1, 2–3, 2–4			Oran; Referees: Arnaldo Petronilli (ITA), Igor Virijević (SRB)
29 June 2022; 15:00	Report	three players 2	Goals	Baštrica 4	Oran; Referees: Arnaldo Petronilli (ITA), Igor Virijević (SRB)

Bronze medal game

30 June 2022; 10:00	Report	Spain	16–8	Italy	Oran; Referees: Andrija Đurašković (MNE), Eurico da Silva (POR)
30 June 2022; 10:00	Report	Score by quarters: 2–4, 4–1, 5–2, 5–1			Oran; Referees: Andrija Đurašković (MNE), Eurico da Silva (POR)
30 June 2022; 10:00	Report	Castro 4	Goals	three players 2	Oran; Referees: Andrija Đurašković (MNE), Eurico da Silva (POR)

== Weightlifting ==
Spain competed in weightlifting.

Men

Athlete	Event	Snatch		Clean & Jerk	
Athlete	Event	Result	Rank	Result	Rank
Josué Brachi	−61 kg	116	4	136	4
David Sánchez	−73 kg	140	7	165	6
Martín Liste	−89 kg	145	8	175	7
Marcos Ruiz	−102 kg	175	1st place, gold medalist(s)	208	2nd place, silver medalist(s)

Women

Athlete	Event	Snatch		Clean & Jerk	
Athlete	Event	Result	Rank	Result	Rank
Atenery Hernández	−49 kg	78	2nd place, silver medalist(s)	96	2nd place, silver medalist(s)
Mouna Skandi	−59 kg	82	6	111	4
Ilia Hernández	−71 kg	92	6	121	4

== Wrestling ==
Men's Freestyle

Athlete	Event	Round Robin	Round of 16	Quarterfinal	Semifinal	Repechage 1	Repechage 2	Final / BM	
Athlete	Event	Round Robin	Opposition Result	Opposition Result	Opposition Result	Opposition Result	Opposition Result	Opposition Result	Rank
Levan Metreveli	−57 kg	Karavuş (TUR) L 2-7; Kateb (ALG) W 3-3 VPO1	—N/a		Damour (TUR); W 4-8	—N/a		Karavuş (TUR); L 2-9	3rd place, bronze medalist(s)
Juan Pablo González	−65 kg	—N/a	Kherbache (ALG); L 2-2	did not advance					
Damian Iglesias	−86 kg	—N/a	Bye	Hajdari (ALB); L 2-3	did not advance				
Alejandro Cañada	−97 kg	Nurov (MKD) L 0–10; Saadaoui (TUN) L 2-6; Fardj (ALG) W 4-0	—N/a		Did not advance	—N/a		did not advance	

Men's Greco-Roman

Athlete	Event	Round of 16	Quarterfinal	Semifinal	Repechage 1	Repechage 2	Final / BM	
Athlete	Event	Opposition Result	Opposition Result	Opposition Result	Opposition Result	Opposition Result	Opposition Result	Rank
Daniel Bobillo Vigil	−60 kg	Marvice (ITA); L 6-2	did not advance					
Marcos Sánchez-Silva	−77 kg	Ouakali (ALG); L 2–10	—N/a		Russo (ITA); L 1–6	did not advance		

Women's Freestyle

Athlete	Event	Round Robin	Quarterfinal	Semifinal	Final / BM	
Athlete	Event	Round Robin	Opposition Result	Opposition Result	Opposition Result	Rank
Aintzane Gorría	−50 kg	Demirhan (TUR) L 0–4; Liuzzi (ITA) L 4–13; Doudou (ALG) W 8–2	—N/a	did not advance		
Marina Rueda	−53 kg	—N/a	Hassoune (MAR); W 6-2	Prevolaraki (GRE); L 0-10	Luttenauer (FRA); W 10-11	3rd place, bronze medalist(s)
Graciela Sánchez	−57 kg	Bousetta (TUN) L 0–4 de Vita (ITA) W WO	—N/a	Gün (TUR); L 6-0	Salah (FRA); L 4-3	5
Lydia Pérez	−62 kg	Tuğcu (TUR) W 6–0; Fabian (SRB) W 2–0; Douarre (FRA) L 3–3 VPO1	—N/a	Amri (TUN); L 11–0	Soudani (ALG); W 13-10	3rd place, bronze medalist(s)
Nerea Pampín	−68 kg	Caneva (ITA) L 0–11; Jlassi (TUN) L 7-4	—N/a	did not advance		
Carla Lera	−76 kg	—N/a	Boughezal (ALG); W 11-1	Adar (TUR); L 10-0	Amer (EGY); L 2-0	5
