= Enzo Paleni =

French cyclist

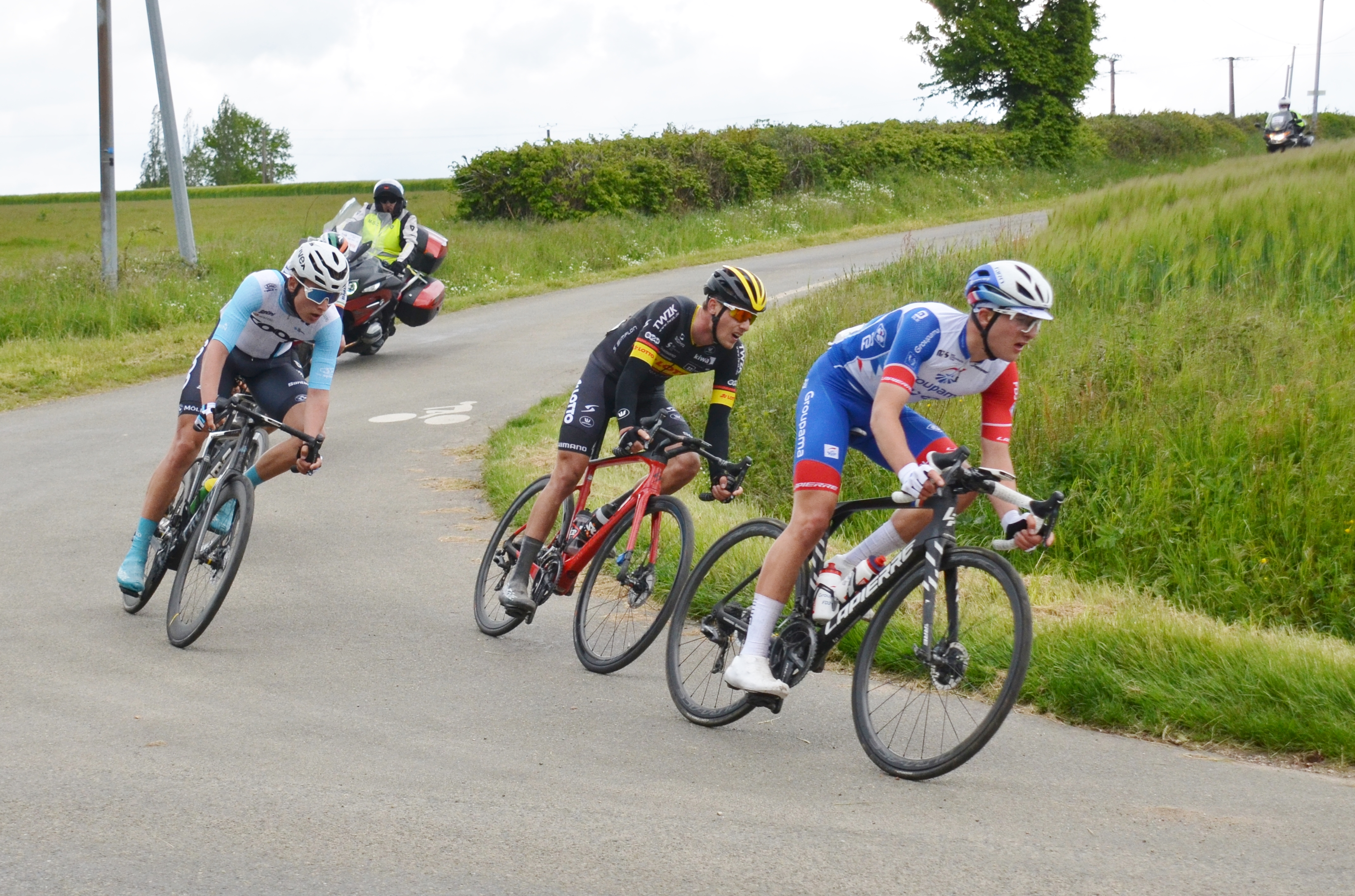
- Paleni (front) in 2021

Personal information
- Born: 30 May 2002 (age 24) Aix-en-Provence, France
- Height: 1.78 m (5 ft 10 in)
- Weight: 65 kg (143 lb)

Cycling career
- Sport: Cycling
- Current team: Groupama–FDJ United
- Discipline: Road
- Role: Rider

Amateur team
- 2019–2020: Van Rysel-AG2R La Mondiale

Professional teams
- 2021–2022: Équipe Continentale Groupama–FDJ
- 2023–: Groupama–FDJ
Medal record
Men's road cycling
Representing France
Mediterranean Games
Silver medal – second place	2022 Oran	Time trial

Enzo Paleni (born 30 May 2002) is a French professional racing cyclist, who currently rides for UCI WorldTeam Groupama–FDJ United.

== Career ==
In stage 1 of the Giro della Valle d'Aosta Paleni spent the day in the breakaway getting caught by teammate Lenny Martinez on the major hill. Paleni rode in the 2022 European Road Championships finishing in sixth place in the Under-23 Time trial. On 3 August 2022 Groupama–FDJ confirmed they had signed Paleni into their UCI WorldTeam for 2023.

== Major results ==
2019
1st Stage 2a (TTT) Aubel–Thimister–Stavelot
7th Chrono des Nations
2020
2nd Overall Grand Prix Rüebliland
2021
4th Chrono des Nations
2022
1st Overall Le Triptyque des Monts et Châteaux
1st Mountains classification, Tour de la Mirabelle
2nd Time trial, Mediterranean Games
3rd Overall Ronde de l'Isard
6th Grand Prix de la Somme
2023
8th Chrono des Nations
9th Grand Prix La Marseillaise
2024
7th Overall Tour Poitou-Charentes en Nouvelle-Aquitaine
2025
10th Overall Tour Poitou-Charentes en Nouvelle-Aquitaine
2026
Combativity award Stage 17 Vuelta a España

=== Grand Tour general classification results timeline ===
Grand Tour	2024
Giro d'Italia	56
Tour de France	
Vuelta a España	

Legend
—	Did not compete
DNF	Did not finish
