= Samet Ak =

Turkish recurve archer (born 2001)

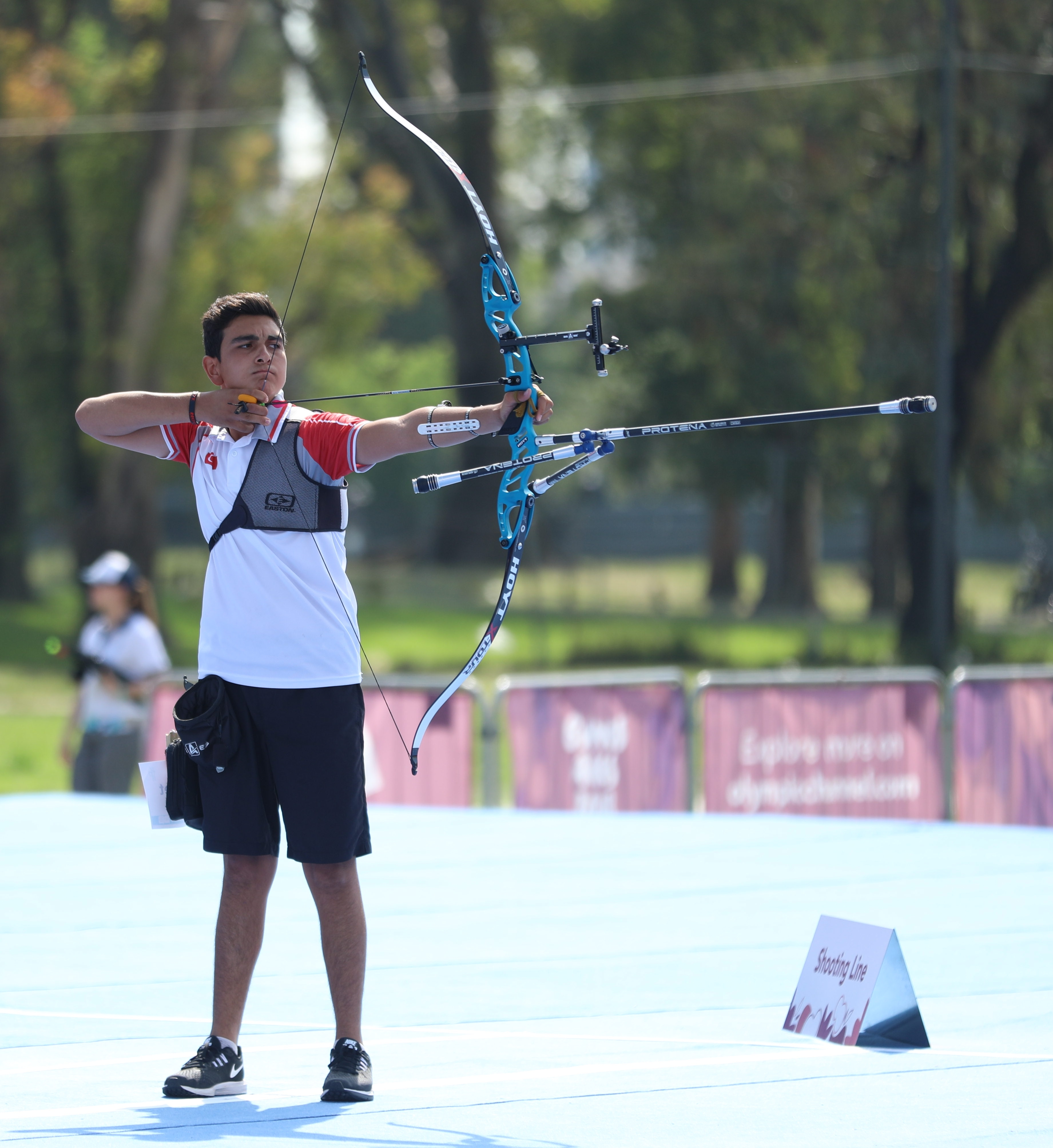
- 2018 Summer Youth Olympics

Personal information
- Nationality: Turkish
- Born: 21 July 2001 (age 24) Mersin, Turkey

Sport
- Country: Turkey
- Sport: Archery
- Event: Archery Recurve
Medal record
Archery Recurve
Representing Turkey
World Cup
Gold medal – first place	2019 Berlin	Team
Silver medal – second place	2019 Shanghai	Team
Bronze medal – third place	2022 Paris	Team
Islamic Solidarity Games
Gold medal – first place	2021 Konya	Individual
Gold medal – first place	2021 Konya	Team
Mediterranean Games
Bronze medal – third place	2022 Oran	Team
European Youth Championships
Gold medal – first place	2018 Patras	Junior Mixed team

Samet Ak (born 21 July 2001) is a Turkish recurve archer.

== Sport career ==
Samet Ak won the gold medal in the men's team recurve event at the 2019 Archery World Cup held in Berlin, Germany.
