= Archery at the 2018 Mediterranean Games – Women's team =

Women's team at the 2018 Mediterranean Games
- Venue: Campclar Athletics Stadium
- Location: Tarragona, Spain
- Dates: 23–24 June
- Competitors: 18 from 6 nations
- Teams: 6

Medalists
gold medal	Marion Bardary; Angéline Cohendet; Bérangère Rogazy	France
silver medal	Mónica Galisteo; Nerea López; Alicia Marín	Spain
bronze medal	Aybüke Aktuna; Yasemin Anagöz; Gülnaz Büşranur Coşkun	Turkey

The women's team archery event was one of 4 archery events at the 2018 Mediterranean Games.

== Schedule ==
All times are local (GMT+2).

Date	Time	Round
June 22, 2018	09:30	Qualification round
June 23, 2018	10:00; 10:30	Quarterfinals; Semifinals
June 24, 2018	10:00	Finals

== Results ==
=== Qualification round ===
Rank	Nation	Archer	Individual Total	Team Total
1	Turkey (TUR)	Aybüke Aktuna; Yasemin Anagöz; Gülnaz Büşranur Coşkun	639; 661; 642	1942
2	Italy (ITA)	Tatiana Andreoli; Lucilla Boari; Tanya Giada Giaccheri	640; 659; 640	1939
3	Spain (ESP)	Mónica Galisteo; Nerea López; Alicia Marín	650; 622; 657	1929
4	France (FRA)	Marion Bardary; Angéline Cohendet; Bérangère Rogazy	626; 643; 612	1881
5	Greece (GRE)	Anatoli Martha Gkorila; Maria Papandreopoulou; Evangelia Psarra	614; 590; 602	1806
6	Cyprus (CYP)	Irene Andreou; Christina Hadjierotokritou; Anna Kallenou	577; 565; 610	1752

=== Competition bracket ===
Quarterfinals
5	Greece (GRE)	4	56	52	54	49	24
4	France (FRA)	5	54	56	50	53	27
3	Spain (ESP)	6	52	54	57
6	Cyprus (CYP)	0	46	46	42

Semifinals
1	Turkey (TUR)	1	51	55	48
4	France (FRA)	5	52	55	52
3	Spain (ESP)	6	55	54	52	53
2	Italy (ITA)	2	50	57	51	50

Gold medal match
4	France (FRA)	5	54	54	57	54
3	Spain (ESP)	3	54	55	56	53
Bronze Medal Match
1	Turkey (TUR)	6	57	54	54
2	Italy (ITA)	0	49	50	49
