= Daniel Castro (archer) =

Spanish archer (born 1997)

Personal information
- Full name: Daniel Castro Barcala
- Nationality: Spanish
- Born: 19 April 1997 (age 29) Puentes de García Rodríguez, La Coruña

Sport
- Sport: Archery
Medal record
Mediterranean Games
Silver medal – second place	2022 Oran	Team

Daniel Castro Barcala (Note: In this Spanish name, the first or paternal surname is Castro and the second or maternal family name is Barcala.) (born 19 April 1997) is a Spanish archer. He competed in the men's individual event at the 2020 Summer Olympics. He won the silver medal in the men's team recurve event at the 2022 European Archery Championships held in Munich, Germany.
