= Portugal men's national water polo team =

Men's national water polo team representing Portugal

Portugal
- FINA code: POR
- Association: Federação Portuguesa de Natação
- Confederation: LEN (Europe)

Olympic Games
- Appearances: 1 (first in 1952)
- Best result: 20th place (1952)

The Portugal men's national water polo team is the representative for Portugal in international men's water polo. Portugal has contested water polo at the Olympics once, in 1952, when they were eliminated in the first round.

== Results ==
=== Olympic Games ===
- 1952 — 20th place
