= Ezgi Başaran =

Turkish recurve archer

Personal information
- Nationality: Turkish
- Born: 20 January 2003 (age 23) Istanbul, Turkey

Sport
- Country: Turkey
- Sport: Archery
- Event: Archery Recurve
- Team: Kaya Archery Sports Club
Medal record
Archery Recurve
Representing Turkey
European Championships
Silver medal – second place	2022 Munich	Women team
Mediterranean Games
Gold medal – first place	2022 Oran	Team

Ezgi Başaran (born 20 January 2003) is a Turkish recurve archer.

== Sport career ==
Ezgi Başaran won the silver medal in the women's team recurve event at the 2022 European Archery Championships held in Munich, Germany.
