= Turkey at the 2022 Mediterranean Games =

- IOC code: TUR
- NOC: Turkish Olympic Committee

in Oran 25 June – 5 July
- Competitors: 321 in 24 sports
- Medals Ranked 0th: Gold 45 Silver 26 Bronze 37 Total 108

Mediterranean Games appearances (overview)
- 1951; 1955; 1959; 1963; 1967; 1971; 1975; 1979; 1983; 1987; 1991; 1993; 1997; 2001; 2005; 2009; 2013; 2018; 2022

Turkey participated in the 2022 Mediterranean Games held in Oran, Algeria from 25 June to 5 July 2022. 321 athletes from Turkey were registered to compete in 24 sports at the Games.

== Medalists ==
Medal	Name	Sport	Event	Date
Gold	Eray Şamdan	Karate	Men's 60 kg	26 June
Gold	Bengisu Erçetin; Nazlıcan İnci	Badminton	Women's doubles	27 June
Gold	Kerem Kamal	Wrestling	Men's Greco-Roman 60 kg	27 June
Gold	Murat Fırat	Wrestling	Men's Greco-Roman 67 kg	27 June
Gold	Osman Yıldırım	Wrestling	Men's Greco-Roman 130 kg	27 June
Gold	Ahmet Önder; Ferhat Arıcan; İbrahim Çolak; Adem Asil; Sercan Demir	Gymnastics	Men's team	27 June
Gold	Adem Asil	Gymnastics	Individual all-around	28 June
Gold	Muhammet Karavuş	Wrestling	Men's Freestyle 57 kg	28 June
Gold	Evin Demirhan	Wrestling	Women's Freestyle 50 kg	29 June
Gold	Bediha Gün	Wrestling	Women's Freestyle 57 kg	29 June
Gold	Yasemin Adar	Wrestling	Women's Freestyle 76 kg	29 June
Gold	İbrahim Çolak	Gymnastics	Rings	29 June
Gold	Adem Asil	Gymnastics	Vault	29 June
Gold	Ferhat Arıcan	Gymnastics	Parallel bars	29 June
Gold	İnci Ece Öztürk	Boules	Lyonnaise - Women's Progressive shooting	29 June
Gold	Buket Öztürk	Boules	Lyonnaise - Women's Precision shooting	29 June
Gold	Bahar Çil	Boules	Raffa - Women's Single	29 June
Gold	İbrahim Arslantaş	Boules	Petanque - Men's Precision shooting	29 June
Gold	Neslihan Yiğit	Badminton	Women's singles	30 June
Gold	Vedat Albayrak	Judo	Men's 81 kg	30 June
Gold	Jak Ali Harvey	Athletics	Men's 100 metres	30 June
Gold	Yasemin Anagöz; Gülnaz Büşranur Coşkun; Ezgi Başaran	Archery	Women's team	1 July
Gold	Yasemin Anagöz; Mete Gazoz	Archery	Mixed team	1 July
Gold	Hatice Akbaş	Boxing	Women's bantamweight	1 July
Gold	Busenaz Sürmeneli	Boxing	Women's welterweight	1 July
Gold	Batuhan Çiftçi	Boxing	Men's featherweight	1 July
Gold	Mihael Žgank	Judo	Men's 90 kg	1 July
Gold	Kayra Sayit	Judo	Women's +78 kg	1 July
Gold	Ferdi Hardal	Weightlifting	Men's 61 kg Snatch	1 July
Gold	Ferdi Hardal	Weightlifting	Men's 61 kg Clean & jerk	1 July
Gold	Yasmani Copello	Athletics	Men's 400m Hurdles	1 July
Gold	Özkan Baltacı	Athletics	Men's Hammer Throw	1 July
Gold	Berkay Ömer Öğretir	Swimming	Men's 200 metre breaststroke	1 July
Gold	Ersu Şaşma	Athletics	Men's Pole Vault	2 July
Gold	Yasemin Can	Athletics	Women's 5000m	2 July
Gold	Ekaterina Guliyev	Athletics	Women's 800m	2 July
Gold	Merve Tuncel	Swimming	Women's 800 m freestyle	2 July
Gold	Merve Dinçel	Taekwondo	Women's 49 kg	3 July
Gold	Hatice Kübra İlgün	Taekwondo	Women's 57 kg	3 July
Gold	Ramil Guliyev	Athletics	Men's 200 m	3 July
Gold	Oğuzhan Tüzün	Shooting	Trap Men	3 July
Gold	Nafia Kuş	Taekwondo	Women's +67 kg	4 July
Gold	Berkay Ömer Öğretir	Swimming	Men's 100 metre breaststroke	5 July
Gold	Deniz Ertan	Swimming	Women's 400 metre freestyle	5 July
Gold	Viktoriya Zeynep Güneş	Swimming	Women's 200 metre breaststroke	5 July
Silver	Samet Ak	Wrestling	Men's Freestyle 74 kg	28 June
Silver	Fatih Erdin	Wrestling	Men's Freestyle 86 kg	28 June
Silver	Feyzullah Aktürk	Wrestling	Men's Freestyle 97 kg	28 June
Silver	Zeynep Yetgil	Wrestling	Women's Freestyle 53 kg	29 June
Silver	Buse Tosun	Wrestling	Women's Freestyle 68 kg	29 June
Silver	Adem Asil	Gymnastics	Rings	29 June
Silver	Adem Asil	Gymnastics	Horizontal bar	29 June
Silver	Ahmet Önder	Gymnastics	Floor exercise	29 June
Silver	Ahmet Emen	Boules	Raffa - Men's Single	29 June
Silver	Kıvılcım Kaya	Athletics	Women's Hammer Throw	30 June
Silver	Ramil Guliyev	Athletics	Men's 100 metres	30 June
Silver	Mete Gazoz	Archery	Men's individual	1 July
Silver	Ayşe Çağırır	Boxing	Women's minimumweight	1 July
Silver	İsmail Keleş	Shooting	10m Air Pistol Men	1 July
Silver	Deniz Ertan	Swimming	Women's 400 metre individual medley	1 July
Silver	Jak Ali Harvey; Kayhan Özer; Ertan Özkan; Ramil Guliyev	Athletics	Men's 4 x 100m Relay	1 July
Silver	Eda Tuğsuz	Athletics	Women's Javelin Throw	2 July
Silver	Tuğba Danışmaz	Athletics	Women's Triple Jump	2 July
Silver	Deniz Ertan	Swimming	Women's 800 m freestyle	2 July
Silver	Emre Sakçı	Swimming	Men's 50 metre breaststroke	2 July
Silver	Muhammed Furkan Özbek	Weightlifting	Men's 73kg - Clean & jerk	2 July
Silver	Nuray Güngör	Weightlifting	Women's 71 kg Snatch	3 July
Silver	Hakan Reçber	Taekwondo	Men's 68 kg	3 July
Silver	Viktoriya Zeynep Güneş	Swimming	Women's 200 metre individual medley	4 July
Silver	Turkey women's national volleyball team: Melis Yılmaz; İlkin Aydın; Emine Arıcı; Ezgi Akyaldız; Buse Ünal; Aslıhan Kılıç; Ayçin Akyol; Buse Kayacan Sonsırma; Tutku Burcu Yüzgenç; Yasemin Yıldırım; Derya Cebecioğlu; Yaprak Erkek	Volleyball	Women's tournament	4 July
Silver	Emre Sakçı	Swimming	Men's 100 metre breaststroke	5 July
Bronze	Tuba Yakan	Karate	Women's 55 kg	26 June
Bronze	Eda Eltemur	Karate	Women's 68 kg	27 June
Bronze	Meltem Hocaoğlu	Karate	Women's +68 kg	27 June
Bronze	Uğur Aktaş	Karate	Men's 84 kg	27 June
Bronze	Ali Cengiz	Wrestling	Men's Greco-Roman 87 kg	27 June
Bronze	Salim Ercan	Wrestling	Men's Freestyle 125 kg	28 June
Bronze	Adem Asil	Gymnastics	Floor exercise	29 June
Bronze	Ferhat Arıcan	Gymnastics	Pommel horse	29 June
Bronze	Ahmet Önder	Gymnastics	Horizontal bar	29 June
Bronze	Özge Bayrak	Badminton	Women's singles	29 June
Bronze	Emre Lale	Badminton	Men's singles	29 June
Bronze	Gülçin Esen; Beyza Tatarlı	Boules	Pétanque - Women's Double	29 June
Bronze	Buse Naz Çakıroğlu	Boxing	Women's light flyweight	30 June
Bronze	Gizem Özer	Boxing	Women's light welterweight	30 June
Bronze	Samet Gümüş	Boxing	Men's light Flyweight	30 June
Bronze	Özlem Becerek	Athletics	Women's Discus Throw	30 June
Bronze	Mete Gazoz; Samet Ak; Muhammed Yıldırmış	Archery	Men's team	1 July
Bronze	Şaziye Erdoğan	Weightlifting	Women's 49 kg Snatch	1 July
Bronze	Şaziye Erdoğan	Weightlifting	Women's 49 kg Clean & jerk	1 July
Bronze	Nurcan Yılmaz	Judo	Women's 78 kg	1 July
Bronze	Hasan Şentürk; Özgür Özkan; Ahmet Berk Başeğmez; Sencer Horasan	Equestrian	Jumping Team	1 July
Bronze	Baturalp Ünlü; Batuhan Filiz; Efe Turan; Doğa Çelik	Swimming	Men's 4 × 200 metre freestyle relay	1 July
Bronze	Merve Tuncel	Swimming	Women's 200 metre butterfly	1 July
Bronze	Viktoriya Zeynep Güneş	Swimming	Women's 100 metre breaststroke	2 July
Bronze	Ekaterina Avramova	Swimming	Women's 200 metre backstroke	2 July
Bronze	Cansel Özkan	Weightlifting	Women's 59 kg Snatch	2 July
Bronze	Nuray Güngör	Weightlifting	Women's 71 kg Snatch	3 July
Bronze	Ecem Güzel	Sailing	Women's Laser Radial	3 July
Bronze	Deniz Ertan; Merve Tuncel; Ecem Dönmez; Beril Böcekler	Swimming	Women's 4 × 200 metre freestyle relay	3 July
Bronze	Mert Kılavuz	Swimming	Men's 1500 metre freestyle	3 July
Bronze	Şevval Ayaz; Ekaterina Guliyev; Tuğba Toptaş; Büşra Yıldırım	Athletics	Women's 4 × 400 m Relay	3 July
Bronze	Oğuzhan Kaya; Yasmani Copello; Sinan Ören; İsmail Nezir	Athletics	Men's 4 x 400m Relay	3 July
Bronze	Ömer Faruk Dayıoğlu	Taekwondo	Men's 58 kg	4 July
Bronze	Deniz Ertan	Swimming	Women's 200 metre individual medley	4 July
Bronze	Berke Saka; Berkay Ömer Öğretir; Ümitcan Güreş; Baturalp Ünlü	Swimming	Men's 4 × 100 metre medley relay	4 July
Bronze	Ekaterina Avramova; Viktoriya Zeynep Güneş; Deniz Ertan; İlknur Nihan Çakıcı	Swimming	Women's 4 × 100 metre medley relay	4 July
Bronze	İrem Karamete	Fencing	Women's Foil Individual	5 July

Medals by sport
Sport	1st place, gold medalist(s)	2nd place, silver medalist(s)	3rd place, bronze medalist(s)	Total
Archery	2	1	1	4
Athletics	7	5	3	15
Badminton	2	0	2	4
Boules	4	1	1	6
Boxing	3	1	3	7
Equestrian	0	0	1	1
Fencing	0	0	1	1
Gymnastics	5	3	3	11
Judo	3	0	1	4
Karate	1	0	4	5
Sailing	0	0	1	1
Shooting	1	1	0	2
Swimming	5	5	9	19
Taekwondo	3	1	1	5
Volleyball	0	1	0	1
Weightlifting	2	2	4	8
Wrestling	7	5	2	14
Total	45	26	37	108

== Archery ==
Athlete	Event	Ranking round		Round of 64	Round of 32	Round of 16	Quarterfinals	Semifinals	Final/BM	Rank
Athlete	Event	Score	Rank	Round of 64	Round of 32	Round of 16	Quarterfinals	Semifinals	Final/BM	Rank
Muhammed Abdullah Yıldırmış	Men's Individual	628	17	Bay	Stefanovic (SRB); L 2-6	Did not advance				17
Samet Ak	Men's Individual	654	5	Bay	Goncalves (POR); W 6-0	Bernardi (FRA); L 4-6	Did not advance			9
Mete Gazoz	Men's Individual	670	1	Bay	Loizu (CYP); W 6-0	Stefanovic (SRB); W 6-2	Ravnikar (SLO); W 6-2	Bernardi (FRA); W 6-0	Musolesi (ITA); L 4-6	2nd place, silver medalist(s)
Muhammed Abdullah Yıldırmış; Samet Ak; Mete Gazoz	Men's team	1952	2			Bay	Algeria; W 6-0	Spain; L 2-6	Italy; W 5-4	3rd place, bronze medalist(s)
Ezgi Başaran	Women's Individual	641	5		Bay	Hacıerotokritu (CYP); W 6-2	Canales (ESP); W 6-4	Infante (ESP); L 5-6	Florent (FRA); L 3-7	4
Gülnaz Büşranur Coşkun	Women's Individual	638	6		Bayu (LBA); W 6-0	Rebagliati (ITA); W 6-0	Florent (FRA); L 3-7	Did not advance		7
Yasemin Ecem Anagöz	Women's Individual	649	1		Bay	Maunier (FRA); W 6-0	Infante (ESP); L 1-7	Did not advance		8
Ezgi Başaran; Gülnaz Büşranur Coşkun; Yasemin Ecem Anagöz	Women's team	1928	1				Bay	France; W 5-1	Italy; W 5-3	1st place, gold medalist(s)
Yasemin Ecem Anagöz; Mete Gazoz	Mixed team	1319	1			Bay	Cyprus; W 6-0	Spain; W 6-5	Italy; W 5-3	1st place, gold medalist(s)

== Athletics ==
=== Men ===
Track & road events

Athlete	Event	Semifinal		Final	
Athlete	Event	Result	Rank	Result	Rank
Ramil Guliyev	100 m	10.24	2	10.16	2nd place, silver medalist(s)
Jak Ali Harvey	100 m	10.22	1	10.15	1st place, gold medalist(s)
Ramil Guliyev	200 m	20.74	1	20.21	1st place, gold medalist(s)
Jak Ali Harvey	200 m	—N/a	DNF	Did not advance	—N/a
Oğuzhan Kaya	400 m	47.43	14	Did not advance	—N/a
Sinan Ören	400 m	47.10	13	Did not advance	—N/a
Salih Toksöz	800 m	1:50.05	4	Did not advance	—N/a
Ramazan Barbaros	1500 m	—N/a	—N/a	3:53.55	13
Sezgin Ataç	5000 m	—N/a	—N/a	—N/a	DNF
Aras Kaya	5000 m	—N/a	—N/a	13:44.67	4
Ramazan Özdemir	Half marathon	—N/a	—N/a	—N/a	DNF
Mikdat Sevler	110 m hurdles	13.40	2	13.57	4
İsmail Nezir	400 m hurdles	49.59	5	50.09	7
Yasmani Copello	400 m hurdles	49.08	2	48.27	1st place, gold medalist(s)
Hilal Yego	3000 m steeplechase	—N/a	—N/a	8:33.43	6
Jak Ali Harvey; Ramil Guliyev; Kayhan Özer; Ertan Özkan	4 × 100 m relay	—N/a	—N/a	38.98	2nd place, silver medalist(s)
Oğuzhan Kaya; Yasmani Copello; Sinan Ören; İsmail Nezir	4 × 400 m relay	—N/a	—N/a	3:04.55	2nd place, silver medalist(s)

Field events

Athlete	Event	Final	
Athlete	Event	Result	Rank
Alperen Acet	High jump	2,13	9
Ersu Şaşma	Pole Vault	5.75	1st place, gold medalist(s)
Necati Er	Long Jump	7.76	5
Necati Er	Triple Jump	16.52	4
Özkan Baltacı	Hammer Throw	74,34	1st place, gold medalist(s)
Ömer Şahin	Discus Throw	57.87	8
Enes Çankaya	Discus Throw	57.43	9
Emin Öncel	Javelin Throw	73.95	6

=== Women ===
Track & road events

Athlete	Event	Semifinal		Final	
Athlete	Event	Result	Rank	Result	Rank
Mizgin Ay	100 m	11.78	8	11.86	8
Mizgin Ay	200 m	—N/a	DNS	Did not advance	—N/a
Büşra Yıldırım	400 m	—N/a	—N/a	53.59	5
Tuğba Toptaş	800 m	2:06.82	8	2:05.33	8
Ekaterina Guliyev	800 m	2:02.64	1	2:01.08	1st place, gold medalist(s)
Emine Hatun Tuna	1500 m	—N/a	—N/a	—N/a	DNS
Şilan Ayyıldız	1500 m	—N/a	—N/a	4:14.45	5
Emine Hatun Tuna	5000 m	—N/a	—N/a	16:18.07	8
Yasemin Can	5000 m	—N/a	—N/a	15:23.47	1st place, gold medalist(s)
Meryem Erdoğan	Half marathon			1:14:11	4
Şevval Ayaz	100 m hurdles	13.22	4	Did not advance	—N/a
Tuğba Güvenç	3000 m steeplechase	—N/a	—N/a	—N/a	DNF

Field events

Athlete	Event	Final	
Athlete	Event	Result	Rank
Buse Savaşkan	High Jump	1.84	5
Tuğba Danışmaz	Triple Jump	14.05	2nd place, silver medalist(s)
Kıvılcım Kaya Salman	Hammer throw	69,82	2nd place, silver medalist(s)
Özlem Becerek	Discus throw	61,96	3rd place, bronze medalist(s)
Eda Tuğsuz	Javelin Throw	59.30	2nd place, silver medalist(s)
Esra Türkmen	Javelin Throw	56.03	4

== Badminton ==
Turkey competed in badminton.

Athlete	Event	Round of 32	Round of 16	Quarterfinal	Semifinal	Final	Rank
Emre Lale	Men's singles	Bay	Hamek (ALG); W 2–0 (21–14, 21–13)	Toti (ITA); W 2–0 (21–13, 21–13)	Abián (ESP); L 0–2 (16–21, 18–21)	—N/a	3rd place, bronze medalist(s)
Nurullah Saraç	Men's singles	Rodrigues (POR); W 2–0 (21–16, 21–17)	Peñalver (ESP); L 0–2 (18–21, –21)	Did not advance			9
Özge Bayrak	Women's singles	Bay	Sotiryu (GRE); W 2–1 (21–19, 20–22, 21–8)	Fink (ITA); W 2–0 (21–14, 21–17)	Corrales (ESP); L 0–2 (14–21, 22–24)	—N/a	3rd place, bronze medalist(s)
Neslihan Yiğit	Women's singles	Bay	Setién (ESP); W 2–0 (21–14, 21–17)	Hamza (ITA); W 2–0 (21–10, 21–12)	Hany (EGY); W 2–0 (21–13, 21–6)	Corrales (ESP); W 2–0 (21–14, 21–11)	1st place, gold medalist(s)
Bengisu Erçetin; Nazlıcan İnci	Women's doubles	—N/a	Bay	Setién & Corrales (ESP); W 2–0 (21–8, 21–15)	Sudimac & Lončar (SRB); W 2–0 (21–10, 21–11)	Fink & Hamza (ITA); W 2–0 (21–15, 21–18)	1st place, gold medalist(s)

== Basketball ==
=== Men's 3x3 tournament ===
Group A

Pos	Team	Pld	W	L	PF	PA	PD	Qualification
1	Turkey	2	1	1	39	29	+10	Quarterfinals
2	Algeria	2	1	1	35	39	−4	Quarterfinals
3	Italy	2	1	1	31	37	−6	

Rules for classification: 1) Wins; 2) Head-to-head record; 3) Points scored.

30 June
18:00

Report

Turkey	18–19	Algeria

Sidi M’hamed Public Garden Court, Oran

1 July
17:00

Report

Italy	10–21	Turkey

Sidi M’hamed Public Garden Court, Oran

Quarterfinal

2 July
20:40

Report

Turkey	18–14	Portugal

Sidi M’hamed Public Garden Court, Oran

Semifinals

3 July
18:10

Report

Turkey	12–15	France

Sidi M’hamed Public Garden Court, Oran

Bronze medal game

3 July
21:50

Report

Turkey	13–16 (OT)	Spain

Sidi M’hamed Public Garden Court, Oran

=== Women's 3x3 tournament ===
Group C

Pos	Team	Pld	W	L	PF	PA	PD	Qualification
1	Spain	3	3	0	55	40	+15	Quarterfinals
2	Turkey	3	2	1	40	37	+3	Quarterfinals
3	Slovenia	3	1	2	36	37	−1	
4	Greece	3	1	2	37	51	−14	

Rules for classification: 1) Wins; 2) Head-to-head record; 3) Points scored.

30 June
19:20

Report

Spain	18–15	Turkey

Sidi M’hamed Public Garden Court, Oran

30 June
22:40

Report

Turkey	10–9	Slovenia

Sidi M’hamed Public Garden Court, Oran

1 July
21:40

Report

Turkey	15–13	Greece

Sidi M’hamed Public Garden Court, Oran

Quarterfinal

2 July
21:20

Report

Portugal	10–13	Turkey

Sidi M’hamed Public Garden Court, Oran

Semifinal

3 July
17:50

Report

Turkey	10–19	France

Sidi M’hamed Public Garden Court, Oran

Bronze medal game

3 July
21:30

Report

Italy	14–12	Turkey

Sidi M’hamed Public Garden Court, Oran

== Boules ==
Turkey competed in boules.

Men

Athlete	Event	Preliminary round				Final			Rank
Athlete	Event	Heat 1/Tour 1	Heat 2/Tour 2	Heat 3	Heat 4	Quarterfinals	Semifinals	Final/BM	Rank
Faik Dursun Öztürk	Lyonnaise precision shooting	8	10			Did not advance			
Mehmet Can Yakın	Lyonnaise progressive shooting	40	42			Milicevic (CRO); L 42-48	Did not advance		
Onur Yılmaz; İbrahim Arslantaş	Pétanque men's doubles	Andorra; W 12-11	Italy; L 4-15	Tunisia; L 12-13		Did not advance			
İbrahim Arslantaş	Pétanque precision shooting	39				Amormino (ITA); W 34-21	Uaglissi (ALG); W 30-25	Bugriba (TUN); W 31-29	1st place, gold medalist(s)
Ahmet Emen	Raffa men's individual	Dall'olmo (SMR); W 8-5	Uynaksi (MAR); W 12-8	Rouault (FRA); W 12-11				Visconti (ITA); L 2-12	2nd place, silver medalist(s)
Murat Alan; Ahmet Emen	Raffa men's doubles	Libya; L 9-12	Egypt; W 12-0	Algeria; L 10-12					

Women

Athlete	Event	Preliminary round			Final			Rank
Athlete	Event	Heat 1/Tour 1	Heat 2/Tour 2	Heat 3	Quarterfinals	Semifinals	Final/BM	Rank
Buket Öztürk	Lyonnaise precision shooting	12	22		Vilchez (ESP); W 16-5	Bajric (CRO); W 13-8	Basei (ITA); W 14-7	1st place, gold medalist(s)
İnci Ece Öztürk	Lyonnaise progressive shooting	34	35		Boljevic (MNE); W 39-16	Volcina (SLO); W 34-28	Vojkovic (CRO); W 35-28	1st place, gold medalist(s)
Gülçin Esen; Beyza Tatarlı	Pétanque women's doubles	Spain; L 4-12	France; W 11-8			Tunisia; L 5-13	Algeria; W 13-5	3rd place, bronze medalist(s)
Gülçin Esen	Women's precision shooting	19	20			Did not advance		
Bahar Çil	Raffa women's individual	Elbez (LBA); G 8-5	Morelli (ITA); M 0-12	Paoletti (SMR); G 12-5			Aissiui (ALG); G 9-7	1st place, gold medalist(s)
Bahar Çil; Pınar Demir	Raffa women's doubles	Algeria; L 0-12	Libya; W 8-5				Algeria; L 4-12	

== Boxing ==
Turkey competed in boxing.

Men

Athlete	Event	Round of 16	Quarterfinals	Semifinals	Final	
Athlete	Event	Opposition Result	Opposition Result	Opposition Result	Opposition Result	Rank
Samet Gümüş	Flyweight (52 kg)	—N/a	Bajoku (KOS); W 3-0	Serra (ITA); L 0-3	—N/a	3rd place, bronze medalist(s)
Batuhan Çiftçi	Featherweight(57 kg)	—N/a	Barrul (ESP); W 3-0	Zouhairi (MAR); W 3-0	Mordjane (ALG); W 3–0	1st place, gold medalist(s)
Hakan Doğan	Lightweight (60 kg)	Benlaribi (ALG); L 1-2	Did not advance			9
Kerem Özmen	Light welterweight (63 kg)	Veljovic (BIH); W RSC	Abdelli (ALG); L 1-2	Did not advance		5
Nejati Ekinci	Welterweight (69 kg)	Beqiri (ALB); L 1-2	Did not advance			9
Serhat Güler	Middleweight (75 kg)	Cvitanović (BIH); L 0-3	Did not advance			9
Kaan Aykutsun	Light heavyweight (81 kg)	Youssef (SYR); W RSC-I	Mironchikov (SRB); L 0-3	Did not advance		5
Burak Aksın	Heavyweight (91 kg)	Bouafia (FRA); L 0-3	Did not advance			9
Uğur Aydemir	Super heavyweight (+91 kg)	—N/a	Bouloudinats (ALG); L 0-3	Did not advance		5

Women

Athlete	Event	Round of 16	Quarterfinals	Semifinals	Final	
Athlete	Event	Opposition Result	Opposition Result	Opposition Result	Opposition Result	Rank
Ayşe Çağırır	Minimumweight	—N/a	Bonatti (ITA); W 2-1	Hafsi (TUN); W 3-0	Boualam (ALG); L 0–2	2nd place, silver medalist(s)
Buse Naz Çakıroğlu	Light flyweight	—N/a	Mansouri (ALG); W 2–1	Moulai (FRA); L WO	—N/a	3rd place, bronze medalist(s)
Hatice Akbaş	Bantamweight	Chebbi (TUN); W 3–0	Charaabi (ITA); W 3–0	Ayyad (EGY); W 3–0	Gojković (MNE); W 3–0	1st place, gold medalist(s)
Gizem Özer	Light welterweight	—N/a	Bye	Khelif (ALG); L 0–3	—N/a	3rd place, bronze medalist(s)
Busenaz Sürmeneli	Welterweight	—N/a	Gajić (SRB); W RSC	Gemini (ITA); W 3–0	Chaib (ALG); W 3–0	1st place, gold medalist(s)

== Cycling ==
Men

Athlete	Event	Time	Rank
Burak Abay	Road race	3:15:35	36
Samet Bulut	Road race	3:33:05	57
Feritcan Şamlı	Road race	3:33:05	58
Batuhan Özgür	Road race	3:15:35	32
Ahmet Örken	Road race	3:30:02	47
Ahmet Örken	Road time trial	33:49.46	8

Women

Athlete	Event	Time	Rank
Azize Bekar	Road race	1:58:24	14
Fatma Sezer	Road race	2:13:19	28

== Equestrian ==
Athlete	Horse	Event	Round 1		Round 2			Final					
Athlete	Horse	Event	Round 1		Round 2			Round A		Round B		Total	
Athlete	Horse	Event	Penalties	Rank	CP	Total	Sıra	CP	Rank	CP	Rank	CP	Rank
Ahmet Berk Başeğmez	Corthagos 58	Individual										24	18
Hasan Şentürk	Cantaire O	Individual										9	4
Özgür Özkan	Champ's Son	Individual										14	11
Sencer Horasan	Casscord	Individual										49	21
Ahmet Berk Başeğmez; Hasan Şentürk; Özgür Özkan; Sencer Horasan		Team						1		20		21	3rd place, bronze medalist(s)

== Fencing ==
Turkey competed in fencing.

Men

Athlete	Event	Match #1	Match #2	Match #3	Match #4	Match #5	Round of 16	Quarterfinal	Semifinal	Final / BM	Rank
Hilmi Talha Ekenler	Epée	Allegre (FRA); W 5-1	Cuomo (ITA); L 0-5	Pujol (ESP); W 5-4	Kraira (ALG); W 5-4	Taliotis (CYP); L 4-5	Jerent (FRA); L 10-15	Did not advance			11
Martino Munito	Flöre	Madi (ALG) W 5-0	Macedo (POR) W 5-1	Hamza (EGY); L 1-5	Filippi (ITA); L 3-5	Bibard (FRA); L 3-5	Bianchi (ITA); L 4-15	Did not advance			11
Enver Yıldırım	Sabre	İzem (ALG); W 5-1	Nuccio (ITA); L 3-5	Hmissi (TUN); W 5-2	Elsissi (EGY); L 2-5	Annic (FRA); W 5-2	Amir (EGY); L 11-15	Did not advance			11

Women

Athlete	Event	Match #1	Match #2	Match #3	Match #4	Match #5	Round of 16	Quarterfinal	Semifinal	Final / BM	Rank
Aleyna Ertürk	Epée	Vitalis (FRA); L 1-5	Grijak (SRB); L 4-5	Rizzi (ITA); W 5-3	Melek (ALG); W 5-0	Mami (TUN); W 5-0	Grijak (SRB); L 10-15	Did not advance			10
Gökçe Günaç	Epée	Ebu Cude (LBN); W 5-1	Vanryssel (FRA); L 1-5	Damjanoska (MKD); W 5-1	Marzani (ITA); L 4-5	Gueham (ALG); W 5-0	Calleja (ESP); L 12-14	Did not advance			9
Alisa İşbir	Foil	Marino (ESP); L 1-5	Recher (FRA); W 5-0	Batini (ITA); L 2-5	Zebbuc (ALG); W 5-1		Marechal (FRA); W 15-13	Patru (FRA); L 7-15			8
İrem Karamete	Foil	Guemmar (ALG); W 5-0	Patru (FRA); L 4-5	Cipressa (ITA); L 3-5	Caude (LBN); W 5-4		Oliveira (POR); W 15-11	Cipressa (ITA); W 15-11	Calissi (ITA); L 9-15		3rd place, bronze medalist(s)
Iryna Shchukla	Sabre	Budiaf (ALG); W 5-4	Mormile (ITA); L 2-5	Aime (FRA); W 5-2	Gargano (ITA); L 4-5	Laso (ESP); W 5-2	Bay	Budiaf (ALG); L 12-15			8

== Football ==
Summary

Team	Event	Group stage				Semifinal	Final / BM	
Team	Event	Opposition Score	Opposition Score	Opposition Score	Rank	Opposition Score	Opposition Score	Rank
Turkey U18 men's	Men's tournament	Greece; W 2–1	Portugal; L 0–2	Italy; D 0–0	2	France; L 0–2	Morocco; L 2–4	4

Team roster

Team (U-18)

Goalkeepers

- Serhat Öztaşdelen
- Jankat Yılmaz

Defenders

- Eren Tunalı
- Emir Ortakaya
- Emir Tintiş
- Mehmet Enes Gülalan
- Yaşar Kavas
- Ali Şahin Yılmaz

Midfielders

- Sami Satılmış
- Ulusoy Mert Kabasakal
- Teoman Gündüz
- Mehmet Ali Büyüksayar
- Devran Şenyurt
- Muhammed Mustafa Pınarcı

Forwards

- Ahmet Karademir
- Habib Biçer
- Yunus Emre Kefeli
- Ali Kılıç
Coach: (Turkey) Mehmet Hacıoğlu

Group play

Pos	Team	Pld	W	D	L	GF	GA	GD	Pts	Qualification
1	Italy	3	2	1	0	5	0	+5	7	Semifinals
2	Turkey	3	1	1	1	2	3	−1	4	Semifinals
3	Portugal	3	1	0	2	2	3	−1	3	
4	Greece	3	1	0	2	3	6	−3	3	

Source: Oran 2022
26 June 2022
17:00

Greece	1–2	Turkey
Volakis 81'	Report	Yılmaz 39'; Biçer 45+1'

Mers El Hadjadj Stadium, Mers El Hadjadj
Referee: Jérémie Pignard (France)

28 June 2022
20:00

Portugal	2–0	Turkey
Falé 15'; de Freitas 53'	Report

Abdelkrim Kerroum Stadium, Sig
Referee: Youcef Gamouh (Algeria)

30 June 2022
17:00

Turkey	0–0	Italy
	Report

Mers El Hadjadj Stadium, Mers El Hadjadj
Referee: Amir Loucif (Tunisia)

Semifinal

2 July 2022
17:00

France	2–0	Turkey
Messoussa 10'; Dimi 84'	Report

Abdelkrim Kerroum Stadium, Sig
Referee: Youcef Gamouh (Algeria)

Bronze medal match

4 July 2022
17:00

Turkey	2–4	Morocco
Biçer 15', 58'	Report	Anhari 45+1'; Raihani 47'; Maurer 73'; Sadik 86'

Miloud Hadefi Stadium, Bir El Djir
Referee: Bruno José Costa (Portugal)

== Gymnastics ==
Turkey competed in artistic gymnastics.

Men's artistic individual all-around

Athlete	Event	Qualification								Final							
Athlete	Event	Apparatus Score (Rank)						T	R	Apparatus Score (Rank)						T	R
Athlete	Event	VT	F	PH	R	PB	B	T	R	VT	F	PH	R	PB	B	T	R
Ferhat Arıcan	Individual all-around	14,100 (7)		13,800 (6)		14,450 (4)	12,700 (22)	55,050	33								
Ahmet Önder	Individual all-around	13,950 (10)	14,250 (3)	13,150 (15)	13,900 (6)	15,150 (1)	13,650 (4)	84,050	1								
Adem Asil	Individual all-around	13,500 (26)	14,400 (2)	13,300 (14)	14,600 (2)	14,050 (12)	13,800 (2)	83,650	2	14,850	14,050	13,250	14,950	14,100	13,500	84,700	1st place, gold medalist(s)
Sercan Demir	Individual all-around	13,150 (30)	13,450 (9)	10,400 (40)	13,250 (14)	14,000 (13)	13,100 (18)	77,350	15	13,050	13,100	12,250	13,500	14,250	12,850	79,000	10
İbrahim Çolak	Individual all-around		12,400 (26)		14,650 (1)			27,050	43								
Ferhat Arıcan; İbrahim Çolak; Ahmet Önder; Sercan Demir; Adem Asil	Team all-around									41,550 (5)	42,100 (1)	40,250 (1)	43,150 (1)	43,650 (1)	40,550 (1)	251,250	1st place, gold medalist(s)

Men

Athlete	Apparatus	Athlete	Rank
Adem Asil	Floor	14,200	3rd place, bronze medalist(s)
Adem Asil	Rings	14,750	2nd place, silver medalist(s)
Adem Asil	Vault	15,075	1st place, gold medalist(s)
Adem Asil	Horizontal	13,950	2nd place, silver medalist(s)
İbrahim Çolak	Rings	14,850	1st place, gold medalist(s)
Ahmet Önder	Floor	14,300	2nd place, silver medalist(s)
Ahmet Önder	Vault	13,500	8
Ahmet Önder	Parallel bars	14,500	4
Ahmet Önder	Horizontal	13,650	3rd place, bronze medalist(s)
Ferhat Arıcan	Pommel horse	14,000	3rd place, bronze medalist(s)
Ferhat Arıcan	Parallel bars	15,100	1st place, gold medalist(s)

Women artistic individual all-around

Athlete	Event	Qualification						Final					
Athlete	Event	Apparatus Score (Rank)				Total	Rank	Apparatus Score (Rank)				Total	Rank
Athlete	Event	V	FX	UB	BB	Total	Rank	V	FX	UB	BB	Total	Rank
Bengisu Yıldız	Individual all-around	13,000 (9)	12,050 (9)	11,800 (17)	11,600 (19)	48,450	7	12,833	11,333	11,700	10,966	46,832	8
Göksu Üçtaş Şanlı	Individual all-around	12,900 (15)	12,400 (6)		11,600 (20)	36,900	26						
Bilge Tarhan	Individual all-around	12,900 (14)	11,600 (16)	11,850 (16)	11,250 (24)	47,600	11	12,966	10,966	11,733	10,466	46,131	9
Sevgi Seda Kayışoğlu	Individual all-around		11,950 (13)	11,300 (22)	11,900 (15)	35,150	28						
Bengisu Yıldız; Bilge Tarhan; Göksu Üçtaş Şanlı; Nazlı Savranbaşı; Sevgi Seda Kayışoğlu	Team all-around							38,800 (4)	36,400 (3)	36,400 (3)	35,100 (5)	146,700	4

Women

Athlete	Apparatus	Score	Rank
Bilge Tarhan	Vault	12,700	7
Göksu Üçtaş Şanlı	Floor	13,000	4
Bengisu Yıldız	Floor	11,450	8
Bengisu Yıldız	Vault	12,300	8
Nazlı Savranbaşı	Uneven bars	10,200	8

== Handball ==
Summary

Team	Event	Group stage					Semifinal	Final / BM / Pl.	
Team	Event	Opposition Score	Opposition Score	Opposition Score	Opposition Score	Rank	Opposition Score	Opposition Score	Rank
Turkey men's	Men's tournament	Algeria; L 27–32	Spain; L 19–46	North Macedonia; L 22–31	Greece; W 28–26	4	Did not advance	Italy; L 25–34	8
Turkey women's	Women's tournament	North Macedonia; W 34–27	Portugal; L 26–30	Serbia; L 26–31	—N/a	3	Did not advance	Tunisia; W 35–29	5

=== Men's tournament ===
Team roster

Team
- Coşkun Göktepe
- Enis Yatkın
- Hüseyin Bereket
- Samet Kanberoğlu
- Enis Harun Hacıoğlu
- Yaşar Erdem Ateş
- Genco İlanç
- Halil İbrahim Öztürk
- Ali Emre Babacan
- Sedat Yıldırım
- Gökay Bilim
- Atakan Şirin
- Ömer Bağ
- Ömür Pehlivan
- Durmuş Ali Tınkır
- Görkem Biçer
- Şevket Yağmuroğlu
- Tolga Durmaz
- Alper Aydın
- İlkan Keleşoğlu
- Koray Ayar
- Ömer Lütfi Acar
Coach:Okan Halay

Group play

Pos	Team	Pld	W	D	L	GF	GA	GD	Pts	Qualification
1	Spain	4	4	0	0	154	81	+73	8	Semifinals
2	North Macedonia	4	2	1	1	116	98	+18	5	Semifinals
3	Algeria (H)	4	2	1	1	110	107	+3	5	Fifth place game
4	Turkey	4	1	0	3	96	135	−39	2	Seventh place game
5	Greece	4	0	0	4	93	148	−55	0	Ninth place game

Source: Oran 2022
Rules for classification: 1) Points; 2) Head-to-head points; 3) Head-to-head goal difference; 4) Head-to-head goals scored; 5) Goal difference; 6) Goals scored; 7) Draw.
(H) Hosts

27 June 2022; 18:00	Turkey	27–32	Algeria	24 February Indoor Hall, Arzew; Referees: Sá, Sá (POR)
27 June 2022; 18:00	Pehlivan 5	(14–15)	Berkous 6	24 February Indoor Hall, Arzew; Referees: Sá, Sá (POR)
27 June 2022; 18:00	5× (suspension) 2× (red card)	Report	1× (yellow card) 5× (suspension) 1× (red card)	24 February Indoor Hall, Arzew; Referees: Sá, Sá (POR)

28 June 2022; 20:00	Spain	46–19	Turkey	24 February Indoor Hall, Arzew; Referees: Hamidi, Belkhiri (ALG)
28 June 2022; 20:00	Serrano 7	(26–7)	Durmaz, Pehlivan 4	24 February Indoor Hall, Arzew; Referees: Hamidi, Belkhiri (ALG)
28 June 2022; 20:00	2× (suspension)	Report	1× (yellow card) 4× (suspension)	24 February Indoor Hall, Arzew; Referees: Hamidi, Belkhiri (ALG)

1 July 2022; 19:15	Turkey	22–31	North Macedonia	24 February Indoor Hall, Arzew; Referees: Díaz-Flores, Pérez (ESP)
1 July 2022; 19:15	Durmaz 5	(12–13)	Petkovski 11	24 February Indoor Hall, Arzew; Referees: Díaz-Flores, Pérez (ESP)
1 July 2022; 19:15	1× (yellow card) 8× (suspension) 2× (red card)	Report	3× (suspension)	24 February Indoor Hall, Arzew; Referees: Díaz-Flores, Pérez (ESP)

2 July 2022; 17:00	Greece	26–28	Turkey	24 February Indoor Hall, Arzew; Referees: Farsi, Kahouadji (ALG)
2 July 2022; 17:00	Stefanitsis 4	(14–11)	Şirin 7	24 February Indoor Hall, Arzew; Referees: Farsi, Kahouadji (ALG)
2 July 2022; 17:00	6× (suspension)	Report	2× (yellow card) 3× (suspension) 1× (red card)	24 February Indoor Hall, Arzew; Referees: Farsi, Kahouadji (ALG)

Seventh place game

4 July 2022; 12:30	Italy	34–25	Turkey	24 February Indoor Hall, Arzew; Referees: Jakovljević, Sando Kovačević (SRB)
4 July 2022; 12:30	Mengon, Moretti 6	(22–11)	İlanç 8	24 February Indoor Hall, Arzew; Referees: Jakovljević, Sando Kovačević (SRB)
4 July 2022; 12:30		Report	1× (yellow card) 5× (suspension)	24 February Indoor Hall, Arzew; Referees: Jakovljević, Sando Kovačević (SRB)

=== Women's tournament ===
Team roster

Team
- Merve Durdu
- Fatma Gül Sakızcan
- Ceyhan Coşkunsu
- Beyza Irem Türkoglu
- Elif Sıla Aydın
- Tuana Akman
- Emine Gökdemir
- Ayşenur Kara
- Aslı İskit
- Neslihan Çalışkan
- Betül Yılmaz
- Ayşenur Sormaz
- Yasemin Şahin
- Fatma Küçükyıldız
- Gülcan Tügel
- Beyza Karaçam
- Merve Özbolluk
- Ece Sözmen
- Nurceren Akgün Göktepe
- Ceren Demirçelen
- Cansu Akalın
Coach: Costică Buceschi

Group play

Pos	Team	Pld	W	D	L	GF	GA	GD	Pts	Qualification
1	Serbia	3	3	0	0	78	64	+14	6	Semifinals
2	Portugal	3	2	0	1	69	64	+5	4	Semifinals
3	Turkey	3	1	0	2	86	88	−2	2	Fifth place game
4	North Macedonia	3	0	0	3	62	79	−17	0	Seventh place game

Source: Oran 2022
Rules for classification: 1) Points; 2) Head-to-head points; 3) Head-to-head goal difference; 4) Head-to-head goals scored; 5) Goal difference; 6) Goals scored; 7) Draw.

30 June 2022; 12:00	North Macedonia	27–34	Turkey	El Hachemí Hantaz Hall, Aïn El Turk; Referees: Deche, Guarda (ALG)
30 June 2022; 12:00	Kiprijanovska 6	(16–19)	Türkoglu 8	El Hachemí Hantaz Hall, Aïn El Turk; Referees: Deche, Guarda (ALG)
30 June 2022; 12:00	2× (suspension)	Report	4× (yellow card) 6× (suspension)	El Hachemí Hantaz Hall, Aïn El Turk; Referees: Deche, Guarda (ALG)

1 July 2022; 12:00	Turkey	26–30	Portugal	El Hachemí Hantaz Hall, Aïn El Turk; Referees: Farsi, Kahouadji (ALG)
1 July 2022; 12:00	Türkoglu 5	(14–12)	Sabino 9	El Hachemí Hantaz Hall, Aïn El Turk; Referees: Farsi, Kahouadji (ALG)
1 July 2022; 12:00	5× (suspension)	Report	3× (suspension)	El Hachemí Hantaz Hall, Aïn El Turk; Referees: Farsi, Kahouadji (ALG)

2 July 2022; 12:00	Turkey	26–31	Serbia	El Hachemí Hantaz Hall, Aïn El Turk; Referees: Deche, Ghouarda (ALG)
2 July 2022; 12:00	İskit 5	(14–17)	three players 5	El Hachemí Hantaz Hall, Aïn El Turk; Referees: Deche, Ghouarda (ALG)
2 July 2022; 12:00	2× (yellow card) 7× (suspension)	Report	3× (yellow card) 4× (suspension)	El Hachemí Hantaz Hall, Aïn El Turk; Referees: Deche, Ghouarda (ALG)

Fifth place game

4 July 2022; 12:30	Tunisia	29–35	Turkey	El Hachemí Hantaz Hall, Aïn El Turk; Referees: Rodrigues, Pinherio (POR)
4 July 2022; 12:30	Hachana 6	(14–20)	İskit 6	El Hachemí Hantaz Hall, Aïn El Turk; Referees: Rodrigues, Pinherio (POR)
4 July 2022; 12:30	4× (suspension)	Report	1× (yellow card) 5× (suspension)	El Hachemí Hantaz Hall, Aïn El Turk; Referees: Rodrigues, Pinherio (POR)

== Judo ==
Turkey competed in judo.

Men

Athlete	Event	Round of 16	Quarterfinals	Semifinals	Repechage 1	Repechage 2	Final / BM	
Athlete	Event	Opposition Result	Opposition Result	Opposition Result	Opposition Result	Opposition Result	Opposition Result	Rank
Mihraç Akkuş	60 kg	Rea (ITA); W IPP (10 - 0)	Bassou (MAR); L IPP (10 - 0)	—N/a	Yagoubi (ALG); L IPP (10 - 0S1)	—N/a	—N/a	7
Ejder Toktay	66 kg	Balarjishvili (CYP); L IPP (0 - 10)	—N/a	—N/a	—N/a	—N/a	—N/a	9
Bayram Kandemir	73 kg	Bayan (SYR); L WAZ (0S1 - 1S2)	—N/a	—N/a	—N/a	—N/a	—N/a	9
Vedat Albayrak	81 kg	—N/a	Vučurević (BIH); W 1-0 (WAZ)	Gnamien (FRA); W 10-0 (IPP)	—N/a	—N/a	Bedel (ITA); W 1S2-0 (WAZ)	1st place, gold medalist(s)
Mihael Zgank	90 kg	—N/a	Chakarovski (MKD); W 10-0 (IPP)	Mosakhlishvili (ESP); W IPP (10S2 - 0S1)	—N/a	—N/a	Tselidis (GRE); W IPP (10S1 - 0H)	1st place, gold medalist(s)
Mert Şişmanlar	100 kg	—N/a	Sherazadishvili (ESP); L IPP (11 - 0S1)	—N/a	—N/a	Ghares (TUN); W WAZ (0 - 1S1)	Kukolj (SRB); L IPP (0 - 11)	5
Münir Ertuğ	+100 kg	Skalec (CRO); W IPP (10S1 - 0)	Dragič (SLO); L	—N/a	—N/a	Hdiouech (TUN); L PEN (0H - 10S1)	—N/a	7

Women

Athlete	Event	Round of 16	Quarterfinals	Semifinals	Repechage 1	Repechage 2	Final / BM	
Athlete	Event	Opposition Result	Opposition Result	Opposition Result	Opposition Result	Opposition Result	Opposition Result	Rank
Gülkader Şentürk	48 kg	Muminoviq (KOS); L IPP (0S2 - 10S2)	—N/a	—N/a	—N/a	—N/a	—N/a	9
Buketnur Karabulut	52 kg	Asvesta (CYP); L IPP (11 - 0)	—N/a	—N/a	—N/a	—N/a	—N/a	9
Hasret Bozkurt	57 kg	—N/a	Samardzic (BIH); W IPP (0 - 10)	Perišić (SRB); L IPP (10 - 0S1)	—N/a	—N/a	Loxha (KOS); L WAZ (1 - 0S1)	5
Ayten Yeksan	63 kg	D'Isanto (ITA); L IPP (0H - 10S1)	—N/a	—N/a	—N/a	—N/a	—N/a	9
Minel Akdeniz	70 kg	Crisóstomo (POR); L IPP (0 - 10S1)	—N/a	—N/a	—N/a	—N/a	—N/a	9
Nurcan Yılmaz	78 kg	Gomez (ESP); W IPP (10 - 0)	Kuka (KOS); L IPP (10 - 0S1)	—N/a	—N/a	Yatim (TUN); W IPP (10 - 0S1)	Ouallal (ALG); W WAZ (1S1 - 0S1)	3rd place, bronze medalist(s)
Kayra Sayit	+78 kg	—N/a	Žabić (SRB); W IPP (10S1 - 0)	Maranić (CRO); W IPP (11S1 - 0S2)	—N/a	—N/a	Rouhou (TUN); W WAZ (0S1 - 1S2)	1st place, gold medalist(s)

== Karate ==
Athlete	Kategori	Round of 16	Quarterfinals	Semifinals	Final / BM	Rank
Eray Şamdan	Men's 60 kg	Rfigui (TUN); W 0-0	Dujaković (BIH); W 8-0	Aboukora (EGY); W 5-1	Salmi (ALG); W 5-0	1st place, gold medalist(s)
Burak Uygur	Men's 67 kg	Bay	Oubaya (MAR); L 0-1	Did not advanced		7
Erman Eltemur	Men's 75 kg	Salapura (SRB); W 2-0	Gonçalves (POR); W 1-0	Zaid (ALG); L 0-0	Turulja (BIH); L 1-3	5
Uğur Aktaş	Men's 84 kg	Badawy (EGY); L 0-1		Ech-Chaabi (TUN); W 4-4	Ibáñez (ESP); W 3-2	3rd place, bronze medalist(s)
Ömer Faruk Aslan	Men's +84 kg	Tzanos (GRE); L 0-0	Did not advanced			10
Serap Özçelik	Women's 50 kg	Bay	Ben Hassen (TUN); W 0-0	Selama (EGY); L 1-1	El Hayti (MAR); L 0-2	5
Tuba Yakan	Women's 55 kg	De Matos (POR); W 7-1	Zarati (TUN); W 7-1	Youssef (EGY); L 0-8	Gonzales (CYP); W 0-0	3rd place, bronze medalist(s)
Gülbahar Gözütok	Women's 61 kg	Dario (FRA); L 4-4	Did not advanced			11
Eda Eltemur	Women's 68 kg	Bay	Flamand (FRA); W 4-3	Semeraro (ITA); L 1-1	Smiljan (SLO); W 8-3	3rd place, bronze medalist(s)
Meltem Hocaoğlu	Women's +68 kg	Kydonaki (GRE); L 1-4		Perović (SRB); W 1-0	Crivelli (ITA); W 5-4	3rd place, bronze medalist(s)

== Sailing ==
Turkey competed in sailing.

Athlete	Event	Race																		Net points	Final rank
Athlete	Event	1	2	3	4	5	6	7	8	9	10	11	12	13	14	15	16	17	M*	Net points	Final rank
Yiğit Yalçın Çıtak	Laser	6	13	~~29~~	8	29	11	6	29										10	112	14
Berkay Abay	Laser	7	12	2	12	7	~~29~~	8	15										9	72	10
Onur Cavit Biriz	iQFOiL	6	8	7	8	3	11	12	~~21~~	5	5	4	6	4	7	8	4	7	4	109	6
Luis Göktepe	iQFOiL	9	10	9	10	6	9	10	10	6	6	8	10	8	9	9	~~11~~	9	6	144	9
Nazlı Çağla Dönertaş	Laser Radial	4	4	12	4	4	3	2	~~25~~										6	40	5
Ecem Güzel	Laser Radial	2	2	~~13~~	8	2	2	4	6										7	33	3rd place, bronze medalist(s)
Dilara Uralp	iQFOiL	8	8	11	9	8	10	10	4	~~15~~	11	10	8	11	9	11	9		7	144	10
Merve Vatan	iQFOiL	9	12	8	7	11	11	8	7	~~15~~	8	6	4	9	6	5	6		11	128	8

== Shooting ==
Turkey competed in shooting.

Men

Athlete	Event	Qualification	Rank	Final	Rank
Yusuf Dikeç	10 m air pistol	573	7	145,4	8
İsmail Keleş	10 m air pistol	576	3	249,5	2nd place, silver medalist(s)
Ömer Akgün	10 m air rifle	625,7	5	153,0	7
Yusuf Karabina	10 m air rifle	617,7	15	Did not advance	
Oğuzhan Tüzün	Trap	121	4	29	1st place, gold medalist(s)
Nedim Tolga Tuncer	Trap	122	2		
Baran Ahmet	Skeet	67	14	Did not advance	
Mustafa Serhat Şahin	Skeet	71	10	Did not advance	

Women

Athlete	Event	Qualification	Rank	Final	Rank
Şevval İlayda Tarhan	10 m air pistol	566	7	244,6	4
Elif Beyza Aşık	10 m air pistol	566	8	194,1	6
Şeymanur Koca	10 m air rifle	618,4	15	Did not advance	
Gülşen Delen	10 m air rifle	608,1	22	Did not advance	
Safiye Sarıtürk	Trap	110	10	Did not advance	
Rümeysa Pelin Kaya	Trap	112	9	Did not advance	
Nur Banu Balkancı	Skeet	110	8	16	7
Sena Can	Skeet	65	9	Did not advance	

Mixed events

Athlete	Event	Qualification	Qualification	Final/BM	Qualification
İsmail Keleş; Elif Beyza Aşık	10 m air pistol	568	3	Italy; L 14-16	4
Yusuf Dikeç; Şevval İlayda Tarhan	10 m air pistol	565	6	Did not advance	
Ömer Akgün; Şeymanur Koca	10 m air rifle	623,9	6	Did not advance	
Yusuf Karabina; Gülşen Delen	10 m air rifle	610,3	16	Did not advance	
Mustafa Serhat Şahin; Nur Banu Balkancı	Skeet	90	8	Did not advance	
Baran Ahmet; Sena Can	Skeet	90	8	Did not advance	

== Swimming ==
Men

Athlete	Event	Heat		Final	
Athlete	Event	Time	Rank	Time	Rank
Berkay Ömer Öğretir	50 m breaststroke	27.80	5	28.00	6
Berkay Ömer Öğretir	100 m breaststroke	1:01.06	1	1:00.03	1st place, gold medalist(s)
Berkay Ömer Öğretir	200 m breaststroke	2:12.62	1	2:11.26	1st place, gold medalist(s)
Kaan Korkmaz	200 m breaststroke	2:22.80	15	Did not advance	
Kaan Korkmaz	200 m individual medley	2:08.56	14	Did not advance	
Kaan Korkmaz	400 m individual medley	4:29.23	8	4:29.09	8
Polat Turnalı	100 m butterfly	56.01	15	Did not advance	
Polat Turnalı	200 m butterfly	2:00.12	3	2:00.54	6
Polat Turnalı	400 m individual medley	4:29.29	9	Did not advance	
Efe Turan	200 m freestyle	1:50.97	7	1:51.68	8
Efe Turan	400 m freestyle	3:59.46	9		
Berke Saka	100 m backstroke	56.18	12	Did not advance	
Berke Saka	200 m backstroke	2:02.74	11	Did not advance	
Berke Saka	200 m individual medley	2:02.77	5		
Baturalp Ünlü	200 m freestyle	1:49.64	3	1:49.11	5
Batuhan Filiz	400 m freestyle	3:52.52	2	3:50.26	4
Batuhan Filiz	1500 m freestyle	15:18.99	1	15:29.05	7
Ümit Can Güreş	50 m butterfly	24.25	10	Did not advance	
Ümit Can Güreş	100 m butterfly	53.53	10	Did not advance	
Doğa Çelik	100 m freestyle	51.20	15	Did not advance	
Emre Gürdenli	50 m freestyle	22.70	10	Did not advance	
Hüseyin Emre Sakçı	50 m freestyle	22.65	7	22.37	4
Hüseyin Emre Sakçı	100 m freestyle	50.97	14	Did not advance	
Hüseyin Emre Sakçı	50 m breaststroke	27.46	2	27.00	2nd place, silver medalist(s)
Hüseyin Emre Sakçı	100 m breaststroke	1:02.17	6	1:00.19	2nd place, silver medalist(s)
Hüseyin Emre Sakçı	50 m butterfly	24.08	6	23.96	7
Mert Kılavuz	1500 m freestyle	15:30.50	5	15:15.41	3rd place, bronze medalist(s)
Doruk Tekin	50 m backstroke	25.75	7	25.69	8
Hüseyin Emre Sakçı; Doğa Çelik; Baturalp Ünlü; Emre Gürdenli	4x100 m freestyle relay			3:19.35	4
Baturalp Ünlü; Batuhan Filiz; Efe Turan; Doğa Çelik	4x200 m freestyle relay			7:23.67	3rd place, bronze medalist(s)
Baturalp Ünlü; Berke Saka; Berkay Ömer Öğretir; Ümit Can Güreş	4x100 m medley relay	3:41.15	1	3:36.29	3rd place, bronze medalist(s)

Women

Athlete	Event	Heat		Final	
Athlete	Event	Time	Rank	Time	Rank
Viktoriya Zeynep Güneş	50 m breaststroke	32.19	8	DNS	
Viktoriya Zeynep Güneş	100 m breaststroke	1:08.85	3	1:08.44	3rd place, bronze medalist(s)
Viktoriya Zeynep Güneş	200 m breaststroke	2:31.53	3	2:26.48	1st place, gold medalist(s)
Viktoriya Zeynep Güneş	200 m individual medley	2:17.09	1	2:12.26	2nd place, silver medalist(s)
Viktoriya Zeynep Güneş	400 m individual medley	4:51.67	6	4:46.30	4
Deniz Ertan	200 m individual medley	2:17.93	3	2:14.15	3rd place, bronze medalist(s)
Deniz Ertan	400 m individual medley	4:46.28	1	4:40.97	2nd place, silver medalist(s)
Deniz Ertan	400 m freestyle	4:11.39	1	4:08.04	1st place, gold medalist(s)
Deniz Ertan	800 m freestyle			8:29.03	2nd place, silver medalist(s)
Ekaterina Avramova	50 m backstroke	28.83	2	28.89	4
Ekaterina Avramova	100 m backstroke	1:01.89	1	1:02.03	4
Ekaterina Avramova	200 m backstroke	2:13.80	3	2:12.72	3rd place, bronze medalist(s)
Sudem Denizli	200 m backstroke	2:15.87	8	2:14.96	6
Merve Tuncel	200 m butterfly	2:13.54	3	2:12.59	3rd place, bronze medalist(s)
Merve Tuncel	200 m freestyle	2:02.47	10	Did not advance	
Merve Tuncel	800 m freestyle			8:26.80	1st place, gold medalist(s)
Defne Taçyıldız	100 m butterfly	1:03.99	12	Did not advance	
Defne Taçyıldız	200 m butterfly	2:14.17	6	2:16.22	8
Ecem Dönmez	200 m butterfly	29.47	17	Did not advance	
Sezin Eligül	50 m freestyle	26.91	18	Did not advance	
Sezin Eligül	50 m backstroke	29.21	7	29.37	8
Sezin Eligül	50 m butterfly	27.46	11	Did not advance	
Beril Böcekler	200 m freestyle	2:04.53	13	Did not advance	
Beril Böcekler	400 m freestyle	4:15.84	5	4:17.92	6
İlknur Nihan Çakıcı	50 m freestyle	26.57	14	Did not advance	
İlknur Nihan Çakıcı	100 m freestyle	57.66	14	Did not advance	
Ekaterina Avramova; İlknur Nihan Çakıcı; Sezin Eligül; Viktoriya Zeynep Güneş	4x100 m freestyle relay			3:49.39	5
Deniz Ertan; Merve Tuncel; Ecem Dönmez; Beril Böcekler	4x200 m freestyle relay			8:05.41	3rd place, bronze medalist(s)
Aleyna Özkan; Ekaterina Avramova; Viktoriya Zeynep Güneş; Selen Özbilen	4x100 m medley relay			4:07.31	3rd place, bronze medalist(s)

== Volleyball ==
Turkey competed in volleyball.

Summary

Team	Event	Group stage				Quarterfinal	Semifinal	Final / BM	
Team	Event	Opposition Score	Opposition Score	Opposition Score	Rank	Opposition Score	Opposition Score	Opposition Score	Rank
Turkey women's	Women's tournament	Algeria; W 3–0	Italy; W 3–1	Spain; W 3–1	1 Q	Tunisia; W 3–0	Serbia; W 3–0	Italy; L 1–3	2nd place, silver medalist(s)

Team	Event	Group stage				Quarterfinal	5th–8th	Fifth place game	
Team	Event	Opposition Score	Opposition Score	Opposition Score	Rank	Opposition Score	Opposition Score	Opposition Score	Rank
Turkey men's	Men's tournament	Algeria; W 3–0	Greece; L 2–3	France; L 0–3	2 Q	Italy; L 0–3	Greece; W 3–1	Tunisia; W 3–1	5

=== Men's tournament ===
Team
- Aslan Ekşi
- Oğuzhan Doğruluk
- Oğulcan Yatgın
- Gökhan Gökgöz
- Mehmet Hacıoğlu
- Cansın Enaboifo Ogbaı
- İzzet Ünver
- Burakhan Tosun
- Metin Toy
- Doğukan Ulu
- Berkay Bayraktar
- Mustafa Cengiz
Coach:Hakan Özkan

Group B

Pos	Team	Pld	W	L	Pts	SW	SL	SR	SPW	SPL	SPR	Qualification
1	France	3	3	0	8	9	2	4.500	265	226	1.173	Final round
2	Turkey	3	1	2	4	5	6	0.833	230	253	0.909	Final round
3	Greece	3	1	2	3	5	8	0.625	286	285	1.004	Final round
4	Algeria	3	1	2	3	3	6	0.500	156	213	0.732	

Date	Time		Score		Set 1	Set 2	Set 3	Set 4	Set 5	Total	Report
26 Jun	18:00	Turkey	3–0	Algeria	25–22	25–23	25–23			75–68	P2 P3
27 Jun	21:00	Greece	3–2	Turkey	25–23	22–25	25–8	23–25	15–13	110–94	P2 P3
28 Jun	21:00	Turkey	0–3	France	21–25	22–25	18–25			61–75	P1 P3

Quarterfinal

Date	Time		Score		Set 1	Set 2	Set 3	Set 4	Set 5	Total	Report
30 Jun	10:00	Italy	3–0	Turkey	25–15	25–16	25–15			75–46	P2 P3

Classification 5th–8th

Date	Time		Score		Set 1	Set 2	Set 3	Set 4	Set 5	Total	Report
1 Jul	16:00	Turkey	3–1	Greece	25–19	25–15	21–25	25–21		96–80	Report

Fifth place game

Date	Time		Score		Set 1	Set 2	Set 3	Set 4	Set 5	Total	Report
2 Jul	19:00	Turkey	3–1	Tunisia	25–23	21–25	25–19	25–22		96–89	Report

=== Women's tournament ===
Team
- Melis Yılmaz
- İlkin Aydın
- Emine Arıcı
- Ezgi Akyaldız
- Buse Ünal
- Aslıhan Kılıç
- Ayçin Akyol
- Buse Kayacan Sonsırma
- Tutku Burcu Yüzgenç
- Yasemin Yıldırım
- Derya Cebecioğlu
- Yaprak Erkek
Coach:Alper Hamurcu

Group C

Pos	Team	Pld	W	L	Pts	SW	SL	SR	SPW	SPL	SPR	Qualification
1	Turkey	3	3	0	9	9	2	4.500	267	199	1.342	Final round
2	Italy	3	2	1	6	7	3	2.333	239	189	1.265	Final round
3	Spain	3	1	2	3	4	6	0.667	207	240	0.863	Final round
4	Algeria	3	0	3	0	0	9	0.000	144	229	0.629	

Date	Time		Score		Set 1	Set 2	Set 3	Set 4	Set 5	Total	Report
26 Jun	21:00	Algeria	0–3	Turkey	16–25	4–25	13–25			33–75	Report
27 Jun	18:00	Turkey	3–1	Italy	26–24	25–19	19–25	25–21		95–89	Report
28 Jun	18:00	Turkey	3–1	Spain	22–25	25–16	25–18	25–18		97–77	Report

Quarterfinal

Date	Time		Score		Set 1	Set 2	Set 3	Set 4	Set 5	Total	Report
30 Jun	19:00	Turkey	3–0	Tunisia	25–14	25–15	25–17			75–46	Report

Semifinal

Date	Time		Score		Set 1	Set 2	Set 3	Set 4	Set 5	Total	Report
2 Jul	10:00	Serbia	0–3	Turkey	21–25	14–25	22–25			57–75	Report

Final

Date	Time		Score		Set 1	Set 2	Set 3	Set 4	Set 5	Total	Report
4 Jul	16:30	Turkey	1–3	Italy	24–26	20–25	25–22	22–25		91–98	Report

== Table tennis ==
Turkey competed in table tennis.

Athlete	Event	First Phase			Second Phase			Quarterfinal	Semifinal	Final	Rank
Athlete	Event	Match #1	Match #2	Match #3	Match #1	Match #2	Match #3	Quarterfinal	Semifinal	Final	Rank
Abdullah Taha Yiğenler	Singles	Salih (EGY); L 3-4	Levajac (SRB); W 4-1		Assar (EGY); L 2-4	Bobocica (ITA); L 3-4	Selgas (POR); W	Did not advance			9
İbrahim Gündüz	Singles	Geraldo (POR); L 0-4	Heruf (ALG); W 4-1		Rembert (FRA); L 3-4	Jevtovic (SRB); W 4-3	Martinez (ESP); L 1-4	Did not advance			9
Abdullah Talha Yiğenler; Tugay Şirzat Yılmaz; İbrahim Gündüz	Team	Portugal (POR); L 2-3	Italy (ITA); L 2-3					Did not advance			9
Simay Kulakçeken	Singles	Lupulesku (SRB); L 2-4	Lograibi (ALG); W 4-3	Pavade (FRA); L 2-4	De Matos (POR); W 4-3	Yang (MON); L 0-4	Lutz (FRA); L 2-4	Did not advance			9
Sibel Altınkaya	Singles	Meşref (EGY); L 2-4	Toliu (GRE); W 4-1		Lupulesku (SRB); L 0-4	Piccolin (ITA); W	Zhang Xu (ESP); W 4-1	Yang (MON); L 0-4	Did not advance		5
Simay Kulakçeken; Özge Yılmaz; Sibel Altınkaya	Team	Italy (ITA); L 1-3	Serbia (SRB); L 2-3					Did not advance			7

== Taekwondo ==
Men

Athlete	Event	Round of 16	Quarterfinals	Semifinals	Final	Rank
Ömer Faruk Dayıoğlu	58 kg	—N/a	Teskera (CRO); W 50-5	Lakehal (MAR); L 23-26	—N/a	3rd place, bronze medalist(s)
Hakan Reçber	68 kg	Birzeeq (LBA); W 34-24	Bećović (MNE); W 35-34	Brečić (CRO); W 36-33	Pérez (ESP); L 24-25	2nd place, silver medalist(s)
Hüseyin Kartal	80 kg	Dodesvki (MKD); W 24-13	Quesada (ESP); L 21-32	Did not advanced		5
Emre Kutalmış Ateşli	+80 kg	Bay	Bassel (MAR); L 6-9	Did not advanced		7

Women

Athlete	Event	Round of 16	Quarterfinals	Semifinals	Final	Rank
Merve Dinçel	49 kg	—N/a	Stanković (SRB); W 16-3	Duvančić (CRO); W 7-5	Cerezo (ESP); W 7-1	1st place, gold medalist(s)
Hatice Kübra İlgün	57 kg	—N/a	Teggeri (CYP); W 22-2	Al Halwani (ITA); W 12-3	Darwish (EGY); W 28-7	1st place, gold medalist(s)
Mervenur Evci	67 kg	Atamani (ALG); W 17-6	Castro (ESP); L 5-19	Did not advanced		5
Nafia Kuş	+67 kg	—N/a	Kadi (ALG); W 20-0	Petanjek (CRO); W 11-10	Aboufaras (MAR); W 5-0	1st place, gold medalist(s)

== Tennis ==
Turkey competed in tennis.

Men

Athlete	Event	Round of 32	Round of 16	Quarterfinal	Semifinal	Final/BM	Rank
Yankı Erel	Singles	Dominko (SLO); W 2-1 (6-7, 6-4, 6-4)	Maamoun (EGY); L 0-2 (4-6, 4-6)	Did not advance			
Koray Kırcı	Singles	Rihane (ALG); W 2-0 (6-3, 6-2)	Chrysochos (CYP); L 0-2 (6-7, 5-7)	Did not advance			
Sarp Ağabigün; Koray Kırcı	Doubles	—N/a	Coelho & Gomes (POR); W 2-0 (7-5, 6-2)	Abderrahman & Ouakaa (TUN); W 2-1 (7-6, 6-7, 10-2)	Arnaldi & Passaro (ITA); L 0-2 (2-6, 1-6)	Benchetrit & Moundir (MAR); L 0-2 (1-6, 6-7)	4

Women

Athlete	Event	Round of 32	Round of 16	Quarterfinal	Semifinal	Final/BM	Rank
Zeynep Sönmez	Singles	—N/a	Bajri (ALB); W 2-0 (6-1, 6-2)	Brancaccio (ITA); L 0-2 (1-6, 4-6)	Did not advance		
İlay Yörük	Singles	—N/a	Gjinaj (KOS); W 2-0 (6-1, 6-1)	Bechri (TUN); L 1-2 (6-4, 1-6, 2-6)	Did not advance		
Başak Eraydın; Doğa Türkmen	Doubles	—N/a	—N/a	Bechri & Ben Hassen (TUN); L 1-2 (7,6, 4-6, 6-10)	Did not advance		

== Water polo ==
Summary

Team	Event	Group stage				Semifinal	Final / BM / Pl.	
Team	Event	Opposition Score	Opposition Score	Opposition Score	Rank	Opposition Score	Opposition Score	Rank
Turkey men's	Men's tournament	Italy; L 2–13	Greece; L 7–21	Spain; L 8–15	4	Did not advance	France; L 10–11	8

Group play

Pos	Team	Pld	W	D	L	GF	GA	GD	Pts	Qualification
1	Spain	3	3	0	0	41	27	+14	6	Semifinals
2	Italy	3	2	0	1	31	22	+9	4	Semifinals
3	Greece	3	1	0	2	38	29	+9	2	Fifth place game
4	Turkey	3	0	0	3	17	49	−32	0	Seventh place game

Source: Oran 2022

24 June 2022; 18:00	Report	Turkey	2–13	Italy	Oran; Referees: Matevž Homovec (SLO), Eurico da Silva (POR)
24 June 2022; 18:00	Report	Score by quarters: 1–2, 1–4, 0–2, 0–5			Oran; Referees: Matevž Homovec (SLO), Eurico da Silva (POR)
24 June 2022; 18:00	Report	Caner, Kuloğlu 1	Goals	Cora, Taramasco 4	Oran; Referees: Matevž Homovec (SLO), Eurico da Silva (POR)

26 June 2022; 18:00	Report	Greece	21–7	Turkey	Oran; Referees: Eurico da Silva (POR), Matevž Homovec (SLO)
26 June 2022; 18:00	Report	Score by quarters: 4–2, 4–3, 7–1, 6–1			Oran; Referees: Eurico da Silva (POR), Matevž Homovec (SLO)
26 June 2022; 18:00	Report	Spachits 4	Goals	Erçıkdı, Koyuncu 2	Oran; Referees: Eurico da Silva (POR), Matevž Homovec (SLO)

28 June 2022; 16:00	Report	Spain	15–8	Turkey	Oran; Referees: Matevž Homovec (SLO), Ghislain Dehon (FRA)
28 June 2022; 16:00	Report	Score by quarters: 6–3, 1–2, 4–2, 4–1			Oran; Referees: Matevž Homovec (SLO), Ghislain Dehon (FRA)
28 June 2022; 16:00	Report	Frigola, Gil 3	Goals	Caner 5	Oran; Referees: Matevž Homovec (SLO), Ghislain Dehon (FRA)

Seventh place game

29 June 2022; 10:00	Report	Turkey	10–11	France	Oran; Referees: Andrija Đurašković (MNE), Matevž Homovec (SLO)
29 June 2022; 10:00	Report	Score by quarters: 1–1, 1–3, 4–3, 4–4			Oran; Referees: Andrija Đurašković (MNE), Matevž Homovec (SLO)
29 June 2022; 10:00	Report	Caner 5	Goals	Mas 3	Oran; Referees: Andrija Đurašković (MNE), Matevž Homovec (SLO)

== Weightlifting ==
Men

Athlete	Event	Snatch		Clean & jerk	
Athlete	Event	Result	Rank	Result	Rank
Ferdi Hardal	61 kg	128	1st place, gold medalist(s)	153	1st place, gold medalist(s)
Muhammed Furkan Özbek	73 kg	145	5	184	2nd place, silver medalist(s)
Celil Erdoğdu	89 kg	153	5	~~191~~	DNF
Onur Demirci	102 kg	155	8	~~196~~	DNF
Ali Oflaz	+102 kg	152	4	186 kg	4

Women

Athlete	Event	Snatch		Clean & jerk	
Athlete	Event	Result	Rank	Result	Rank
Şaziye Erdoğan	49 kg	75	3rd place, bronze medalist(s)	95	3rd place, bronze medalist(s)
Cansel Özkan	59 kg	92	3rd place, bronze medalist(s)	106	6
Nuray Güngör	71 kg	99	3rd place, bronze medalist(s)	122	2nd place, silver medalist(s)

== Wrestling ==
Men's Freestyle

Athlete	Event	Round of 16	Quarterfinal	Semifinal	Repechage	Final / BM	Rank
Münir Recep Aktaş	65 kg	Bay	Abakarov (ALB); L 4-8		Bay	Mićić (SRB); L 0-4	5
Samet Ak	74 kg		Dudaev (ALB); W 6-3	Ikkal (ALG); W 7-2		Hussen (EGY); L 1-11	2nd place, silver medalist(s)
Fatih Erdin	86 kg	Bay	Charalambos (CYP); W 10-0	Hajdari (ALB); W 10-0		Amine (SMR); L 1-4	2nd place, silver medalist(s)
Salim Ercan	125 kg	Bay	Shala (KOS); W 10-0	Nurasulov (SRB); L 2-10		Khalil (ALG); W 10-0	3rd place, bronze medalist(s)
		Group #1	Group #2				
Muhammet Karavuş	57 kg	Vartanov (ESP); W 7-2	Kateb (ALG); W 6-0	Morris (ITA); W 10-0		Vartanov (ESP); W 9-2	1st place, gold medalist(s)
Feyzullah Aktürk	97 kg	Iannattoni (ITA); W 10-0	Elders (EGY); W 7-0	Saadaoui (TUN); W 10-2		Nurov (MKD); L 3-4	2nd place, silver medalist(s)

Greco-Roman

Athlete	Event	Round of 16	Quarterfinal	Semifinal	Repechage	Final / BM	Rank
Kerem Kamal	60 kg	Bay	Mahmoud (EGY); W 7-6	Lizatović (CRO); W 9-1		Tudezca (FRA); W 8-0	1st place, gold medalist(s)
Murat Fırat	67 kg		Snjoyan (FRA); W 6-3	Sanfilippo (ITA); W 6-1		Ghaiou (ALG); W 7-6	1st place, gold medalist(s)
Ahmet Yılmaz	77 kg	Prevolarakis (GRE); L 3-3	Did not advanced				10
Ali Cengiz	87 kg		Luburić (CRO); W 6-3	Azara (ALG); L 0-4		Bur (FRA); W 4-0	3rd place, bronze medalist(s)
		Group #1	Group #2				
Osman Yıldırım	130 kg	Ntounias (GRE); W 9-1	Mohamed (EGY); W 3-1	Kouchit (ALG); W 8-0		Mohamed (EGY); W 5-1	1st place, gold medalist(s)

Women's Freestyle

Athlete	Event	Group matches				Quarterfinal	Semifinal	Final / BM	Rank
Athlete	Event	Round 1	Round 2	Round 3	Round 4	Quarterfinal	Semifinal	Final / BM	Rank
Evin Demirhan	50 kg	Doudou (ALG); W 6-0	Liuzzi (ITA); W 8-1	Goñi (ESP); W 8-0			Hamdi (TUN); W 6-5	Sabatié (FRA); W 3-2	1st place, gold medalist(s)
Zeynep Yetgil	53 kg					Di Dio (ITA); W 8-0	Mohamed (EGY); W 4-1	Prevolaraki (GRE); L 1-3	2nd place, silver medalist(s)
Bediha Gün	57 kg	Hussein (EGY); W 10-0	Houfaf (ALG); W 3-0	Salah (FRA); W 4-0			Sánchez (ESP); W 6-0	Bousetta (TUN); W 5-0	1st place, gold medalist(s)
Aslı Tuğcu	62 kg	Fabian (SRB); W 11-0	Douarre (FRA); L 1-8	Pérez (ESP); L 0-6	Did not advanced				5
Buse Tosun	68 kg	Lecarpentier (FRA); W 7-6	Merzouk (ALG); W 10-0				Jlassi (TUN); W 9-0	Lecarpentier (FRA); L 3-4	2nd place, silver medalist(s)
Yasemin Adar	76 kg					Amer (EGY); W 10-0	Celda (ESP); W 10-0	Rinaldi (ITA); W 10-0	1st place, gold medalist(s)
