= Artistic gymnastics at the 2022 Mediterranean Games =

- Venue: Miloud Hadefi Complex Omnisport Arena
- Dates: 26–29 June

The artistic gymnastics competitions at the 2022 Mediterranean Games in Oran took place between 26–29 June at the Miloud Hadefi Complex Omnisport Arena.

== Schedule ==
Q	Qualification	F	Final

Event↓/Date →	Sun 26	Mon 27	Tue 28	Wed 29
Women's individual all-around	Q		F	
Women's team all-around	F			
Women's vault	Q			F
Women's uneven bars	Q			F
Women's balance beam	Q			F
Women's floor	Q			F
Men's individual all-around		Q	F	
Men's team all-around		F		
Men's floor		Q		F
Men's pommel horse		Q		F
Men's rings		Q		F
Men's vault		Q		F
Men's parallel bars		Q		F
Men's horizontal bar		Q		F

== Medalists ==
=== Men ===
Event	Gold	Silver	Bronze
Team all-around	Turkey; Ferhat Arıcan; Adem Asil; İbrahim Çolak; Sercan Demir; Ahmet Önder	Italy; Nicola Bartolini; Lorenzo Minh Casali; Lay Giannini; Matteo Levantesi; Marco Lodadio	France; Cameron-Lie Bernard; Edgar Boulet; Mathias Philippe; Léo Saladino; Julien Saleur
Individual all-around	Adem Asil; Turkey	Joel Plata; Spain	Marios Georgiou; Cyprus
Floor exercise	Nicola Bartolini; Italy	Ahmet Önder; Turkey	Adem Asil; Turkey
Pommel horse	Mateo Žugec; Croatia	Jakov Vlahek; Croatia	Ferhat Arıcan; Turkey
Rings	İbrahim Çolak; Turkey	Adem Asil; Turkey	Ali Zahran; Egypt
Vault	Adem Asil; Turkey	Nicola Bartolini; Italy	Matteo Levantesi; Italy
Parallel bars	Ferhat Arıcan; Turkey	Matteo Levantesi; Italy	Cameron-Lie Bernard; France
Horizontal bar	Marios Georgiou; Cyprus	Adem Asil; Turkey	Ahmet Önder; Turkey

=== Women ===
Event	Gold	Silver	Bronze
Team all-around	Italy; Angela Andreoli; Alice D'Amato; Asia D'Amato; Martina Maggio; Giorgia Villa	France; Lorette Charpy; Carolann Héduit; Djenna Laroui; Morgane Osyssek-Reimer; Célia Serber	Spain; Laura Casabuena; Emma Fernández; Lorena Medina; Alba Petisco; Claudia Villalba
Individual all-around	Martina Maggio; Italy	Asia D'Amato; Italy	Carolann Héduit; France
Vault	Asia D'Amato; Italy	Morgane Osyssek-Reimer; France	Angela Andreoli; Italy
Uneven bars	Giorgia Villa; Italy	Martina Maggio; Italy	Ana Filipa Martins; Portugal
Balance beam	Martina Maggio; Italy	Asia D'Amato; Italy	Carolann Héduit; France
Floor exercise	Asia D'Amato; Italy	Martina Maggio; Italy	Morgane Osyssek-Reimer; France

== Medal table ==
* Host nation (Algeria)

Rank	Nation	Gold	Silver	Bronze	Total
1	Italy	7	7	2	16
2	Turkey	5	3	3	11
3	Croatia	1	1	0	2
4	Cyprus	1	0	1	2
5	France	0	2	5	7
6	Spain	0	1	1	2
7	Egypt	0	0	1	1
7	Portugal	0	0	1	1
9	Algeria*	0	0	0	0
Totals (9 entries)		14	14	14	42

== Participating nations ==
- Albania (1)
- Algeria (10)
- Bosnia and Herzegovina (1)
- Croatia (5)
- Cyprus (6)
- Egypt (10)
- France (10)
- Greece (5)
- Italy (10)
- Kosovo (2)
- Monaco (1)
- Portugal (8)
- Slovenia (6)
- Serbia (2)
- Syria (3)
- Spain (10)
- Turkey (10)
