= Swimming at the 2020 European Aquatics Championships – Mixed 4 × 200 metre freestyle relay =

Mixed 4 × 200 metre freestyle relay at the 2020 European Aquatics Championships
- Venue: Danube Arena
- Dates: 18 May 2021
- Competitors: 53 from 10 nations
- Teams: 10
- Winning time: 7:26.67

Medalists
gold medal	Thomas Dean; James Guy; Abbie Wood; Freya Anderson; Calum Jarvis; Joe Litchfield; Lucy Hope	Great Britain
silver medal	Stefano Ballo; Stefano Di Cola; Federica Pellegrini; Margherita Panziera; Stefania Pirozzi; Filippo Megli; Sara Gailli	Italy
bronze medal	Aleksandr Shchegolev; Aleksandr Krasnykh; Anna Egorova; Anastasiya Kirpichnikova; Ivan Girev; Evgeny Rylov; Maria Kameneva; Arina Surkova	Russia

The Mixed 4 × 200 metre freestyle relay competition of the 2020 European Aquatics Championships was held on 18 May 2021.

== Records ==
Before the competition, the existing European and championship records were as follows.

	Team	Time	Location	Date
European record	Target time	7:22.33		
Championship record	Germany	7:28.43	Glasgow	4 August 2018

The following new records were set during this competition.

Date	Event	Team	Time	Record
18 May	Final	Great Britain	7:26.67	CR

== Results ==
=== Heats ===
The heats were started at 10:57.

Rank	Heat	Lane	Nation	Swimmers	Time	Notes
1	1	5	Great Britain	Calum Jarvis (1:49.68); Joe Litchfield (1:47.55); Lucy Hope (1:59.70); Abbie Wood (1:57.71)	7:34.64	Q
2	2	3	Italy	Stefania Pirozzi (2:00.08); Stefano Di Cola (1:47.00); Filippo Megli (1:47.66); Sara Gailli (2:00.62)	7:35.36	Q
3	2	4	Denmark	Mikkel Gadgaard (1:49.32); Andreas Hansen (1:48.75); Helena Rosendahl Bach (1:58.33); Amalie Søby Mortensen (2:01.55)	7:37.95	Q, NR
4	1	6	Israel	Denis Loktev (1:49.81); Gal Cohen Groumi (1:49.81); Anastasia Gorbenko (2:01.14); Andrea Murez (1:59.48)	7:40.24	Q
5	2	2	Hungary	Balázs Holló (1:48.87); Gábor Zombori (1:48.37); Evelyn Verrasztó (2:02.27); Fanni Fábián (2:00.78)	7:40.29	Q
6	1	4	Russia	Ivan Girev (1:49.80); Evgeny Rylov (1:48.76); Maria Kameneva (1:59.93); Arina Surkova (2:05.58)	7:44.07	Q
7	2	5	Turkey	Baturalp Ünlü (1:49.37); Efe Turan (1:50.23); Merve Tuncel (2:02.46); Deniz Ertan (2:03.79)	7:45.85	Q
8	2	6	Ireland	Max McCusker (1:52.89); Brendan Hyland (1:52.13); Naomi Trait (2:03.57); Victoria Catterson (2:02.65)	7:51.24	Q, NR
9	1	2	Slovakia	Jakub Poliačik (1:53.18); Richard Nagy (1:53.42); Zora Ripková (2:04.74); Martina Cibulková (2:02.99)	7:54.33	NR
10	1	3	Kosovo	Arti Krasniqi (1:56.68); Jona Macula (2:27.10); Olt Kondirolli (2:06.27); Era Budima (2:19.96)	8:50.01	
	2	7	Poland	Did not start		

=== Final ===
The final was held at 19:27.

Rank	Lane	Nation	Swimmers	Time	Notes
1st place, gold medalist(s)	4	Great Britain	Thomas Dean (1:46.54); James Guy (1:45.43); Abbie Wood (1:56.67); Freya Anderson (1:58.03)	7:26.67	CR, NR
2nd place, silver medalist(s)	5	Italy	Stefano Ballo (1:46.96); Stefano Di Cola (1:46.16); Federica Pellegrini (1:55.66); Margherita Panziera (2:00.57)	7:29.35	NR
3rd place, bronze medalist(s)	7	Russia	Aleksandr Shchegolev (1:46.66); Aleksandr Krasnykh (1:47.05); Anna Egorova (1:58.52); Anastasiya Kirpichnikova (1:59.31)	7:31.54	
4	6	Israel	Denis Loktev (1:48.08); Ron Polonsky (1:48.71); Andrea Murez (1:57.31); Anastasia Gorbenko (1:58.86)	7:32.96	NR
5	3	Denmark	Mikkel Gadgaard (1:48.75); Andreas Hansen (1:48.55); Signe Bro (2:00.10); Helena Rosendahl Bach (1:58.41)	7:35.81	NR
6	2	Hungary	Balázs Holló (1:48.54); Gábor Zombori (1:48.37); Laura Veres (1:59.41); Fanni Fábián (2:00.10)	7:36.42	
7	1	Turkey	Baturalp Ünlü (1:48.08); Efe Turan (1:50.43); Merve Tuncel (2:01.99); Deniz Ertan (2:03.52)	7:44.02	
8	8	Ireland	Brendan Hyland (1:51.40); Max McCusker (1:52.33); Naomi Trait (2:04.31); Victoria Catterson (2:02.37)	7:50.41	NR
