= Swimming at the 2024 European Aquatics Championships – Women's 800 metre freestyle =

Women's 800 metre freestyle at the 2024 European Aquatics Championships
- Venue: Sports Centre Milan Gale Muškatirović
- Dates: 17 June (heats); 18 June (final)
- Competitors: 16 from 9 nations
- Winning time: 8:29.96

Medalists
gold medal	Ajna Késely	Hungary
silver medal	Fleur Lewis	Great Britain
bronze medal	Deniz Ertan	Turkey

The Women's 800 metre freestyle competition of the 2024 European Aquatics Championships was held on 17 and 18 June 2024.

== Records ==
Prior to the competition, the existing world, European and championship records were as follows.

	Name	Nation	Time	Location	Date
World record	Katie Ledecky	United States	8:04.79	Rio de Janeiro	12 August 2016
European record	Rebecca Adlington	Great Britain	8:14.10	Beijing	16 August 2008
Championship record	Jazmin Carlin	Great Britain	8:15.54	Berlin	21 August 2014

== Results ==
=== Heats ===
The heats were started on 17 June at 11:03.
Qualification Rules: The 8 fastest from the heats qualify to the final.

Rank	Heat	Lane	Name	Nationality	Time	Notes
1	1	5	Deniz Ertan	Turkey	8:38.00	Q
2	1	3	Fleur Lewis	Great Britain	8:38.33	Q
3	1	4	Boglárka Telegdy-Kapás	Hungary	8:41.22	Q
4	2	4	Ajna Késely	Hungary	8:41.38	Q
5	2	3	Merve Tuncel	Turkey	8:41.60	Q
6	2	5	Jeannette Spiwoks	Germany	8:45.10	Q
7	2	6	Francisca Martins	Portugal	8:47.80	Q
8	2	2	Grace Palmer	Belgium	8:52.57	Q
9	1	6	Nóra Fluck	Hungary	8:53.39	
10	2	7	Vanna Djakovic	Serbia	8:54.57	
11	1	1	Ada Hakkarainen	Finland	8:54.81	
12	1	7	Lena Opatril	Austria	8:57.76	
13	1	2	Johanna Enkner	Austria	8:59.83	
14	2	1	Leonie-Sarah Josephine Tenzer	Austria	8:59.99	
15	1	8	Laura Lahtinen	Finland	9:05.92	
16	2	8	Katarina Ćorović	Serbia	9:20.09	

=== Final ===
The final was held on 18 June at 19:57.

Rank	Lane	Name	Nationality	Time	Notes
1st place, gold medalist(s)	6	Ajna Késely	Hungary	8:29.96	
2nd place, silver medalist(s)	5	Fleur Lewis	Great Britain	8:33.54	
3rd place, bronze medalist(s)	4	Deniz Ertan	Turkey	8:34.31	
4	1	Francisca Martins	Portugal	8:34.35	
5	7	Jeannette Spiwoks	Germany	8:40.05	
6	2	Merve Tuncel	Turkey	8:40.32	
7	3	Boglárka Telegdy-Kapás	Hungary	8:40.33	
8	8	Grace Palmer	Belgium	8:51.04	
