= Swimming at the 2022 Mediterranean Games – Women's 200 metre butterfly =

Women's 200 metre butterfly at the 2022 Mediterranean Games
- Location: Bir El Djir, Algeria
- Dates: 1 July
- Competitors: 14 from 8 nations
- Winning time: 2:09.18

Medalists
gold medal	Lana Pudar	Bosnia and Herzegovina
silver medal	Ana Monteiro	Portugal
bronze medal	Merve Tuncel	Turkey

The women's 200 metre butterfly competition at the 2022 Mediterranean Games was held on 1 July 2022 at the Aquatic Center of the Olympic Complex in Bir El Djir.

== Records ==
Prior to this competition, the existing world and Mediterranean Games records were as follows:

World record	Liu Zige (CHN)	2:01.81	Jinan, China	21 October 2009
Mediterranean Games record	Caterina Giacchetti (ITA)	2:06.89	Pescara, Italy	1 July 2009

== Results ==
=== Heats ===
The heats were started at 11:05.

Rank	Heat	Lane	Name	Nationality	Time	Notes
1	2	4	Lana Pudar	Bosnia and Herzegovina	2:12.83	Q
2	1	4	Ana Monteiro	Portugal	2:13.37	Q
3	1	3	Merve Tuncel	Turkey	2:13.54	Q
4	1	7	Lara Grangeon	France	2:13.55	Q
5	2	6	Juliette Marchand	France	2:14.14	Q
6	2	5	Defne Taçyıldız	Turkey	2:14.17	Q
7	1	6	Georgia Damasioti	Greece	2:14.36	Q
8	2	2	Mariana Cunha	Portugal	2:14.38	Q
9	2	3	Alessia Polieri	Italy	2:14.53	
10	1	2	Júlia Pujadas	Spain	2:15.51	
11	2	7	Carla Hurtado	Spain	2:17.51	
12	2	1	Xanthi Mitsakou	Greece	2:20.29	
13	2	8	Lilia Sihem Midouni	Algeria	2:26.44	
14	1	1	Jihane Benchadli	Algeria	2:29.71	
	1	5	Ilaria Cusinato	Italy	Did not start	

=== Final ===
The final was held at 19:03.

Rank	Lane	Name	Nationality	Time	Notes
1st place, gold medalist(s)	4	Lana Pudar	Bosnia and Herzegovina	2:09.18	
2nd place, silver medalist(s)	5	Ana Monteiro	Portugal	2:09.32	
3rd place, bronze medalist(s)	3	Merve Tuncel	Turkey	2:12.59	
4	8	Mariana Cunha	Portugal	2:12.73	
5	1	Georgia Damasioti	Greece	2:12.78	
6	2	Juliette Marchand	France	2:13.06	
7	6	Lara Grangeon	France	2:14.27	
8	7	Defne Taçyıldız	Turkey	2:16.22	
