= Gymnastics at the 2022 Mediterranean Games – Women's floor =

Women's floor exercise at the 2022 Mediterranean Games
- Venue: Miloud Hadefi Complex Omnisport Arena
- Date: 29 June 2022
- Competitors: 8
- Winning total: 13.500

Medalists
gold medal	(Italy) Asia D'Amato
silver medal	(Italy) Martina Maggio
bronze medal	(France) Morgane Osyssek-Reimer

The Women's floor exercise competition at the 2022 Mediterranean Games was held on 29 June 2022 at the Miloud Hadefi Complex Omnisport Arena.

== Qualification ==
Position	Gymnast	D-score	E-score	Penalty	Total	Notes
1	Martina Maggio (ITA)	5.7	7.800		13.500	Q
2	Asia D'Amato (ITA)	5.4	7.800		13.200	Q
3	Ana Đerek (CRO)	5.1	7.850		12.950	Q
4	Morgane Osyssek-Reimer (FRA)	5.3	7.650	0.1	12.850	Q
5	Laura Casabuena (ESP)	4.9	7.650		12.550	Q
6	Göksu Üçtaş Şanlı (TUR)	4.8	7.600		12.400	Q
7	Alba Petisco (ESP)	5.0	7.350		12.350	Q
8	Emma Fernández (ESP)	4.9	7.250		12.150	–
9	Bengisu Yıldız (TUR)	4.9	7.150		12.050	Q
10	Lorena Medina (ESP)	4.6	7.400		12.000	–
11	Carolann Héduit (FRA)	5.0	7.100	0.1	12.000	R1
12	Angela Andreoli (ITA)	5.7	6.600	0.3	12.000	–
13	Sevgi Kayışoğlu (TUR)	4.8	7.150		11.950	–
14	Jana Mahmoud (EGY)	4.9	7.200	0.2	11.900	R2
15	Lucija Hribar (SLO)	4.3	7.350		11.650	R3

== Final ==
Position	Gymnast	D-score	E-score	Penalty	Total
1st place, gold medalist(s)	Asia D'Amato (ITA)	5.5	8.000		13.500
2nd place, silver medalist(s)	Martina Maggio (ITA)	5.6	7.700		13.300
3rd place, bronze medalist(s)	Morgane Osyssek-Reimer (FRA)	5.2	7.850		13.050
4	Göksu Üçtaş Şanlı (TUR)	5.0	8.000		13.000
5	Alba Petisco (ESP)	5.0	7.950		12.950
6	Ana Đerek (CRO)	5.2	7.650		12.850
7	Laura Casabuena (ESP)	4.9	7.400		12.300
8	Bengisu Yıldız (TUR)	5.0	6.450		11.450
