= Swimming at the 2022 Mediterranean Games – Women's 200 metre individual medley =

Women's 200 metre individual medley at the 2022 Mediterranean Games
- Location: Bir El Djir, Algeria
- Dates: 4 July
- Competitors: 9 from 6 nations
- Winning time: 2:12.19

Medalists
gold medal	Sara Franceschi	Italy
silver medal	Viktoriya Zeynep Güneş	Turkey
bronze medal	Deniz Ertan	Turkey

The women's 200 metre individual medley competition at the 2022 Mediterranean Games was held on 4 July 2022 at the Aquatic Center of the Olympic Complex in Bir El Djir.

== Records ==
Prior to this competition, the existing world and Mediterranean Games records were as follows:

World record	Katinka Hosszú (HUN)	2:06.12	Kazan, Russia	3 August 2015
Mediterranean Games record	Camille Muffat (FRA)	2:10.36	Pescara, Italy	27 June 2009

== Results ==
=== Heats ===
The heats were started at 10:30.

Rank	Heat	Lane	Name	Nationality	Time	Notes
1	1	4	Viktoriya Zeynep Güneş	Turkey	2:17.09	Q
2	2	4	Sara Franceschi	Italy	2:17.41	Q
3	2	6	Deniz Ertan	Turkey	2:17.93	Q
4	1	5	Camille Tissandié	France	2:18.19	Q
5	1	6	Ioanna Sacha	Greece	2:18.93	Q
6	1	3	Paula Juste	Spain	2:19.09	Q
7	2	5	Alba Vázquez	Spain	2:20.44	Q
8	2	2	Hamida Rania Nefsi	Algeria	2:22.71	Q
9	1	2	Jihane Benchadli	Algeria	2:24.24	
	2	3	Ilaria Cusinato	Italy	Did not start	

=== Final ===
The final was held at 18:35.

Rank	Lane	Name	Nationality	Time	Notes
1st place, gold medalist(s)	5	Sara Franceschi	Italy	2:12.19	
2nd place, silver medalist(s)	4	Viktoriya Zeynep Güneş	Turkey	2:12.26	
3rd place, bronze medalist(s)	3	Deniz Ertan	Turkey	2:14.15	
4	7	Paula Juste	Spain	2:15.94	
5	1	Alba Vázquez	Spain	2:16.50	
6	6	Camille Tissandié	France	2:17.57	
7	2	Ioanna Sacha	Greece	2:19.65	
8	8	Hamida Rania Nefsi	Algeria	2:22.77	
