= Swimming at the 2022 Mediterranean Games – Women's 200 metre backstroke =

Women's 200 metre backstroke at the 2022 Mediterranean Games
- Location: Bir El Djir, Algeria
- Dates: 2 July
- Competitors: 11 from 7 nations
- Winning time: 2:10.41

Medalists
gold medal	Camila Rebelo	Portugal
silver medal	África Zamorano	Spain
bronze medal	Ekaterina Avramova	Turkey

The women's 200 metre backstroke competition at the 2022 Mediterranean Games was held on 2 July 2022 at the Aquatic Center of the Olympic Complex in Bir El Djir.

== Records ==
Prior to this competition, the existing world and Mediterranean Games records were as follows:

World record	Regan Smith (USA)	2:03.35	Gwangju, South Korea	26 July 2019
Mediterranean Games record	Alessia Filippi (ITA)	2:08.03	Pescara, Italy	28 June 2009

== Results ==
=== Heats ===
The heats were started at 11:29.

Rank	Heat	Lane	Name	Nationality	Time	Notes
1	2	4	África Zamorano	Spain	2:13.52	Q
2	1	4	Camila Rebelo	Portugal	2:13.77	Q
3	2	3	Ekaterina Avramova	Turkey	2:13.80	Q
4	2	6	Martina Cenci	Italy	2:14.56	Q
5	2	5	Carmen Weiler	Spain	2:14.78	Q
6	2	2	Anaïs Podevin	France	2:15.58	Q
7	1	6	Francesca Furfaro	Italy	2:15.62	Q
8	1	5	Sudem Denizli	Turkey	2:15.87	Q
9	1	3	Ioanna Sacha	Greece	2:16.82	
10	1	2	Imène Kawthar Zitouni	Algeria	2:21.88	NR
11	2	7	Jihane Benchadli	Algeria	2:24.17	

=== Final ===
The final was held at 19:37.

Rank	Lane	Name	Nationality	Time	Notes
1st place, gold medalist(s)	5	Camila Rebelo	Portugal	2:10.41	NR
2nd place, silver medalist(s)	4	África Zamorano	Spain	2:11.48	
3rd place, bronze medalist(s)	3	Ekaterina Avramova	Turkey	2:12.72	
4	2	Carmen Weiler	Spain	2:12.96	
5	6	Martina Cenci	Italy	2:13.82	
6	8	Sudem Denizli	Turkey	2:14.96	
7	7	Anaïs Podevin	France	2:15.28	
8	1	Francesca Furfaro	Italy	2:17.15	
