= Swimming at the 2022 Mediterranean Games – Women's 800 metre freestyle =

Wome's swimming event

Women's 800 metre freestyle at the 2022 Mediterranean Games
- Location: Bir El Djir, Algeria
- Dates: 2 July
- Competitors: 7 from 5 nations
- Winning time: 8:26.80

Medalists
gold medal	Merve Tuncel	Turkey
silver medal	Deniz Ertan	Turkey
bronze medal	Martina Caramignoli	Italy

The women's 800 metre freestyle competition at the 2022 Mediterranean Games was held on 2 July 2022 at the Aquatic Center of the Olympic Complex in Bir El Djir.

== Records ==
Prior to this competition, the existing world and Mediterranean Games records were as follows:

World record	Katie Ledecky (USA)	8:04.79	Rio de Janeiro, Brazil	12 August 2016
Mediterranean Games record	Alessia Filippi (ITA)	8:20.78	Pescara, Italy	30 June 2009

== Results ==
The final was held at 19:15.

Rank	Lane	Name	Nationality	Time	Notes
1st place, gold medalist(s)	4	Merve Tuncel	Turkey	8:26.80	
2nd place, silver medalist(s)	3	Deniz Ertan	Turkey	8:29.03	
3rd place, bronze medalist(s)	5	Martina Caramignoli	Italy	8:31.75	
4	2	Alisia Tettamanzi	Italy	8:37.75	
5	6	Tamila Holub	Portugal	8:45.25	
6	7	Daša Tušek	Slovenia	8:56.97	
7	1	Sara Dande	Albania	9:52.17	
