= Swimming at the 2022 Mediterranean Games – Men's 4 × 200 metre freestyle relay =

Men's 4 × 200-metre freestyle relay at the 2022 Mediterranean Games
- Location: Bir El Djir, Algeria
- Dates: 1 July
- Competitors: 20 from 5 nations
- Teams: 5
- Winning time: 7:17.91

Medalists
gold medal	Dimitrios Markos; Evangelos Makrygiannis; Konstantinos Stamou; Andreas Vazaios	Greece
silver medal	Mario Mollà; Carlos Quijada; Luis Domínguez; Miguel Martínez	Spain
bronze medal	Baturalp Ünlü; Batuhan Filiz; Efe Turan; Doğa Çelik	Turkey

The men's 4 × 200-metre freestyle relay event at the 2022 Mediterranean Games was held on 1 July 2022 at the Aquatic Center of the Olympic Complex in Bir El Djir.

== Records ==
Prior to this competition, the existing world and Mediterranean Games records were as follows:

World record	United States	6:58.55	Rome, Italy	31 July 2009
Mediterranean Games record	Italy	7:09.44	Pescara, Italy	29 June 2009

== Results ==
The final was held at 19:17.

Rank	Lane	Nation	Swimmers	Time	Notes
1st place, gold medalist(s)	3	Greece	Dimitrios Markos (1:47.72); Evangelos Makrygiannis (1:52.22); Konstantinos Stamou (1:50.03); Andreas Vazaios (1:47.94)	7:17.91	
2nd place, silver medalist(s)	2	Spain	Mario Mollà (1:52.59); Carlos Quijada (1:50.23); Luis Domínguez (1:49.03); Miguel Martínez (1:51.22)	7:23.07	
3rd place, bronze medalist(s)	5	Turkey	Baturalp Ünlü (1:49.63); Batuhan Filiz (1:49.92); Efe Turan (1:51.33); Doğa Çelik (1:52.79)	7:23.67	
4	6	Algeria	Mohamed Anisse Djaballah (1:53.00); Sofiane Achour Talet (1:55.26); Lounis Khendriche (1:56.06); Fares Benzidoun (1:55.78)	7:40.10	
	4	Italy	Mattia Zuin (1:49.49); Luca De Tullio (1:49.51); Filippo Megli; Alessio Proietti Colonna	Disqualified	
