= Swimming at the 2022 Mediterranean Games – Men's 1500 metre freestyle =

Men's 1500 metre freestyle at the 2022 Mediterranean Games
- Location: Bir El Djir, Algeria
- Dates: 2 July (heats); 3 July (final)
- Competitors: 12 from 10 nations
- Winning time: 15:10.11

Medalists
| gold medal | Joris Bouchaut | France |
| silver medal | Dimitrios Markos | Greece |
| bronze medal | Mert Kılavuz | Turkey |

The men's 1500 metre freestyle competition at the 2022 Mediterranean Games was held on 2 and 3 July 2022 at the Aquatic Center of the Olympic Complex in Bir El Djir.

== Records ==
Prior to this competition, the existing world and Mediterranean Games records were as follows:

| World record | Sun Yang (CHN) | 14:31.02 | London, Great Britain | 4 August 2012 |
| Mediterranean Games record | Oussama Mellouli (TUN) | 14:38.01 | Pescara, Italy | 1 July 2009 |

== Results ==
=== Heats ===
The heats were started on 2 July at 11:39.

| Rank | Heat | Lane | Name | Nationality | Time | Notes |
|---|---|---|---|---|---|---|
| 1 | 1 | 6 | Batuhan Filiz | Turkey | 15:18.99 | Q |
| 2 | 1 | 3 | Albert Escrits | Spain | 15:20.51 | Q |
| 3 | 2 | 5 | Joris Bouchaut | France | 15:29.48 | Q |
| 4 | 2 | 4 | Luca De Tullio | Italy | 15:29.61 | Q |
| 5 | 1 | 4 | Mert Kılavuz | Turkey | 15:30.50 | Q |
| 6 | 2 | 3 | Ahmed Jaouadi | Tunisia | 15:35.04 | Q |
| 7 | 2 | 6 | Dimitrios Markos | Greece | 15:35.08 | Q |
| 8 | 1 | 5 | Fabio Dalu | Italy | 15:35.90 | Q |
| 9 | 2 | 6 | Loris Bianchi | San Marino | 16:03.32 | |
| 10 | 2 | 2 | Mohamed Anisse Djaballah | Algeria | 16:11.93 | |
| 11 | 1 | 2 | Théo Druenne | Monaco | 16:33.07 | |
| 12 | 1 | 7 | Christos Manoli | Cyprus | 16:41.18 | |

=== Final ===
The final was held on 3 July at 18:58.

| Rank | Lane | Name | Nationality | Time | Notes |
|---|---|---|---|---|---|
| 1st place, gold medalist(s) | 3 | Joris Bouchaut | France | 15:10.11 | |
| 2nd place, silver medalist(s) | 1 | Dimitrios Markos | Greece | 15:11.47 | |
| 3rd place, bronze medalist(s) | 2 | Mert Kılavuz | Turkey | 15:15.41 | |
| 4 | 6 | Luca De Tullio | Italy | 15:16.31 | |
| 5 | 5 | Albert Escrits | Spain | 15:20.55 | |
| 6 | 8 | Fabio Dalu | Italy | 15:28.41 | |
| 7 | 4 | Batuhan Filiz | Turkey | 15:29.05 | |
| 8 | 7 | Ahmed Jaouadi | Tunisia | 15:41.75 | |
