= Morgane Osyssek =

French artistic gymnast

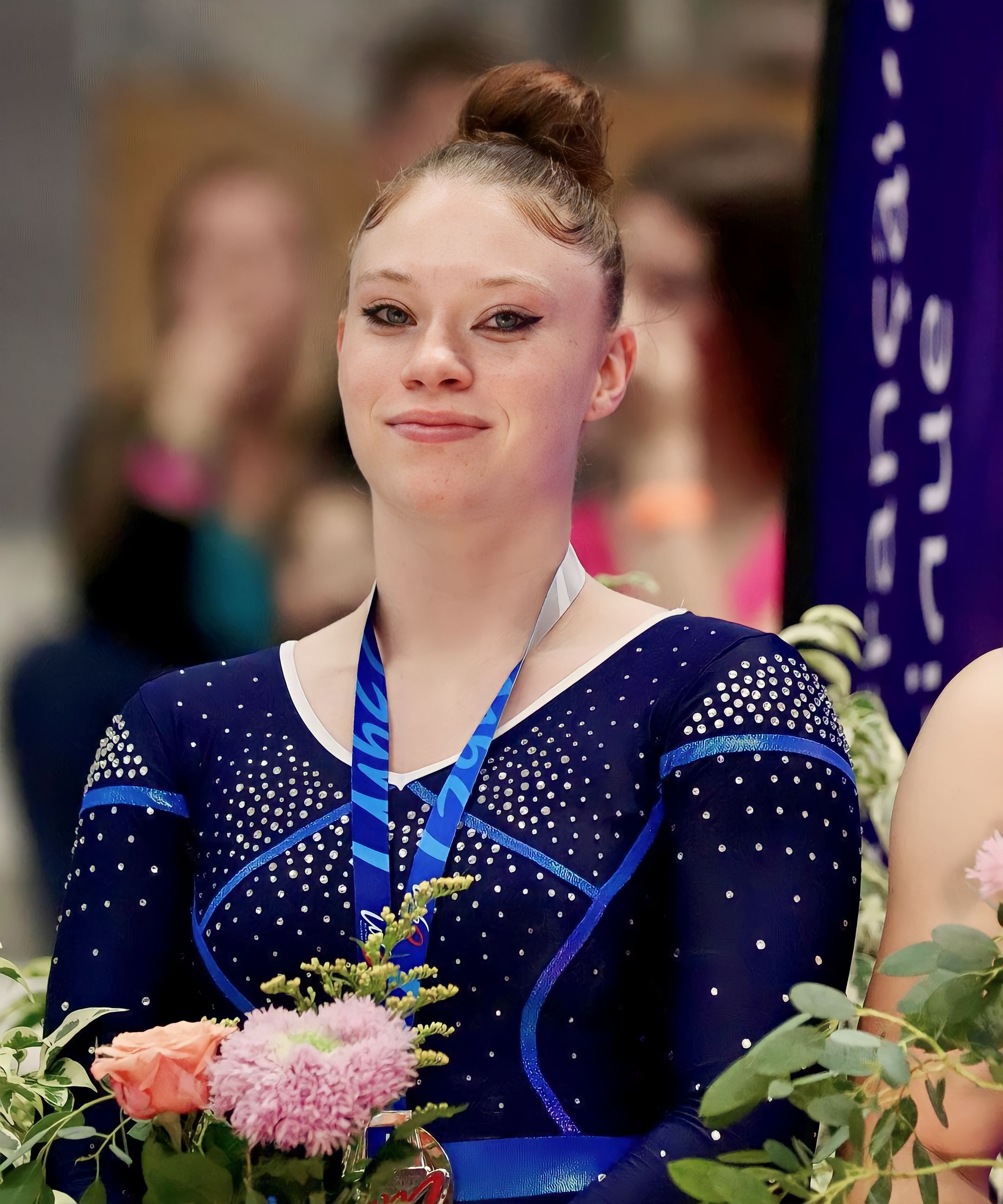
- Osyssek in 2023

Personal information
- Full name: Morgane Osyssek-Reimer
- Nickname: Mo-Mo
- Born: 15 December 2002 (age 23) Colmar, France

Gymnastics career
- Discipline: Women's artistic gymnastics
- Country represented: France; (2015–present)
- Club: Union Haguenau
- Gym: INSEP
- Head coaches: Frédéric Jay, Jérome Martin
- Former coaches: Nadia Masse, Nellu Pop, Martine George, Alisée Dal Santos,Tara Duncanson
- Choreographer: Grégory Milan
Medal record
Representing France
Women's artistic gymnastics
World Championships
| Bronze medal – third place | 2023 Antwerp | Team |
European Championships
| Bronze medal – third place | 2024 Rimini | Team |
| Bronze medal – third place | 2025 Leipzig | Team |
| Bronze medal – third place | 2026 Zagreb | Team |
Mediterranean Games
| Silver medal – second place | 2018 Tarragona | Team |
| Silver medal – second place | 2022 Oran | Team |
| Silver medal – second place | 2022 Oran | Vault |
| Bronze medal – third place | 2022 Oran | Floor exercise |
FIG World Cup
Event / 1st / 2nd / 3rd; World Challenge Cup / 0 / 3 / 3

Morgane Osyssek-Reimer (born 15 December 2002) is a French artistic gymnast. She was a member of the bronze medal-winning teams at the 2023 World Championships and at the 2024, 2025, and 2026 European Championships. She represented France at the 2024 Summer Olympics.

== Early life ==
Osyssek was born in Colmar, France on 15 December 2002.

== Gymnastics career ==
=== 2016 ===
Osyssek competed at the European Championships where she helped France finish fifth as team in the junior division. Individually she placed sixth in the all-around and fifth on vault.

=== 2022 ===
In June, Osyssek competed at the Mediterranean Games, where the French team took the silver medal behind Italy. Individually Osyssek won the silver medal on vault and the bronze medal on floor exercise. At the European Championships in Munich, France finished sixth in the team final. Additionally Osyssek placed seventh on floor exercise.

In October, Osyssek was named as the alternate for the World Championships team. In November, she competed at the Arthur Gander Memorial where she placed third behind Alice D'Amato and Lena Bickel.

=== 2023 ===
Osyssek competed at the DTB Pokal Team Challenge where she helped France finish third. She later competed at the European Championships where she helped France finish sixth; individually she finished thirteenth in the all-around. In August she was named to the team to compete at the World Championships.

At the World Championships Osyssek contributed scores on balance beam and floor exercise towards France's historic bronze medal winning performance. Individually Osyssek was initially the first reserve for the all-around final. She was substituted in when Ou Yushan of China withdrew; she finished fourteenth.

=== 2024 ===
Osyssek competed at the World Challenge Cup in Antalya where she took silver on floor & the bronze on vault. In May Osyssek competed at the European Championships alongside Ming van Eijken, Lorette Charpy, Marine Boyer, and Coline Devillard. During the team final she helped France win the bronze medal behind Italy and Great Britain.

In July, Osyssek was officially selected to represent France at the 2024 Olympic Games alongside Mélanie de Jesus dos Santos, Boyer, Devillard, and van Eijken. They finished eleventh in qualifications and did not advance to the team final.

== Competitive history ==
Competitive history of Morgane Osyssek at the junior level
| Year | Event | Team | AA | VT | UB | BB | FX |
|---|---|---|---|---|---|---|---|
| 2014 | French Championships | 4 | | | | | |
| 2015 | Élite Gym Massilia | | 12 | | | | |
| 2016 | Züri GymDays | 2nd place, silver medalist(s) | 7 | | | | |
| 2016 | FRA vs ROU Friendly | 2nd place, silver medalist(s) | 3rd place, bronze medalist(s) | | | | |
| 2016 | European Championships | 5 | 6 | 5 | | | |
| 2016 | French Championships | | 4 | 2nd place, silver medalist(s) | | | |
| 2016 | French Review | | 1st place, gold medalist(s) | | | | |
| 2016 | Élite Gym Massilia | | 11 | | | | |
| 2017 | International GymSport | | 2nd place, silver medalist(s) | | | | 4 |
| 2017 | French Championships | | 7 | | | | |

Osyssek at the 2026 Paris World Challenge Cup

Competitive history of Morgane Osyssek at the senior level
| Year | Event | Team | AA | VT | UB | BB | FX |
|---|---|---|---|---|---|---|---|
| 2018 | French Championships | | 9 | 1st place, gold medalist(s) | | | |
| 2018 | Mediterranean Games | 2nd place, silver medalist(s) | | | | | |
| 2018 | Rüsselsheim Friendly | 4 | | | | | |
| 2018 | Élite Gym Massilia | | 6 | 9 | 10 | 7 | |
| 2019 | French Championships | | 9 | 3rd place, bronze medalist(s) | | | |
| 2019 | Worms Friendly | 3rd place, bronze medalist(s) | 12 | | | | |
| 2019 | Élite Gym Massilia | | 12 | 5 | | | |
| 2020 | French Test Meet | | 5 | | | | |
| 2020 | Coupe d’Hiver | 3rd place, bronze medalist(s) | 10 | | | | |
| 2021 | French Championships | | 6 | 3rd place, bronze medalist(s) | | | |
| 2021 | Élite Gym Massilia | | 12 | | | 8 | 2nd place, silver medalist(s) |
| 2022 | French Test Meet | | 7 | | | | |
| 2022 | City of Jesolo Trophy | 6 | 17 | | | | |
| 2022 | Varna Challenge Cup | | | | | | 4 |
| 2022 | Mediterranean Games | 2nd place, silver medalist(s) | 2nd place, silver medalist(s) | | | 4 | 3rd place, bronze medalist(s) |
| 2022 | French Championships | | 4 | 2nd place, silver medalist(s) | | 1st place, gold medalist(s) | 3rd place, bronze medalist(s) |
| 2022 | Sedan Friendly | 1st place, gold medalist(s) | 1st place, gold medalist(s) | | | | |
| 2022 | European Championships | 6 | | | | | 7 |
| 2022 | Joaquim Blume Memorial | | 6 | | | | |
| 2022 | World Championships | 8 (Note: Osyssek was the Team FRA alternate.) | | | | | |
| 2022 | Arthur Gander Memorial | | 3rd place, bronze medalist(s) | | | | |
| 2022 | Swiss Cup | 7 | | | | | |
| 2023 | DTB Pokal Team Challenge | 3rd place, bronze medalist(s) | | | | | |
| 2023 | European Championships | 6 | 13 | | | | |
| 2023 | Tel Aviv Challenge Cup | | | 3rd place, bronze medalist(s) | | | 2nd place, silver medalist(s) |
| 2023 | French Championships | | 7 | 2nd place, silver medalist(s) | 4 | | |
| 2023 | Heidelberg Friendly | 3rd place, bronze medalist(s) | 7 | | | | |
| 2023 | World Championships | 3rd place, bronze medalist(s) | 14 | | | | |
| 2024 | Antalya Challenge Cup | | | 3rd place, bronze medalist(s) | | | 2nd place, silver medalist(s) |
| 2024 | City of Jesolo Trophy | 5 | 29 | 4 | | | 7 |
| 2024 | European Championships | 3rd place, bronze medalist(s) | 7 | | | | 5 |
| 2024 | French Championships | | 2nd place, silver medalist(s) | | 3rd place, bronze medalist(s) | 3rd place, bronze medalist(s) | 2nd place, silver medalist(s) |
| 2024 | Olympic Games | 11 | | | | | |
| 2024 | Arthur Gander Memorial | | 7 | | | | |
| 2024 | Swiss Cup | 1st place, gold medalist(s) | | | | | |
| 2025 | French Championships | | 2nd place, silver medalist(s) | | 5 | 1st place, gold medalist(s) | 2nd place, silver medalist(s) |
| 2025 | European Championships | 3rd place, bronze medalist(s) | 4 | | | 4 | |
| 2025 | European Championships Mixed Team | 4 | —N/a | | | | |
| 2025 | Paris World Challenge Cup | | | | | 3rd place, bronze medalist(s) | |
| 2025 | World Championships | | | | | 36 | |
| 2026 | French Championships | | 5 | 1st place, gold medalist(s) | | | 3rd place, bronze medalist(s) |
| 2026 | European Championships | 3rd place, bronze medalist(s) | | | | 8 | |
| 2026 | World Championships | 4 | | | | | |
