= Gymnastics at the 2022 Mediterranean Games – Women's vault =

Women's vault at the 2022 Mediterranean Games
- Venue: Miloud Hadefi Complex Omnisport Arena
- Date: 29 June 2022
- Competitors: 8
- Winning total: 13.875

Medalists
gold medal	(Italy) Asia D'Amato
silver medal	(France) Morgane Osyssek-Reimer
bronze medal	(Italy) Angela Andreoli

The Women's vault competition at the 2022 Mediterranean Games was held on 29 June 2022 at the Miloud Hadefi Complex Omnisport Arena.

== Qualification ==
Rank	Gymnast	Vault 1				Vault 2				Total	Qual.
Rank	Gymnast	D Score	E Score	Pen.	Score 1	D Score	E Score	Pen.	Score 2	Total	Qual.
1	Asia D'Amato (ITA)	5.0	8.850		13.850					13.800	Q
2	Tjaša Kysselef (SLO)	4.6	8.850		13.450					13.225	Q
3	Morgane Osyssek-Reimer (FRA)	4.6	8.700		13.300					13.000	Q
4	Tijana Korent (CRO)	3.8	8.850		12.650					12.750	Q
5	Jana Mahmoud (EGY)	4.4	8.550		12.950					12.725	Q
6	Angela Andreoli (ITA)	4.6	8.400	-0.3	12.700					12.675	Q
7	Bengisu Yıldız (TUR)	4.2	8.800		13.000					12.650	Q
8	Bilge Tarhan (TUR)	4.2	8.700		12.900					12.650	Q
9	Lorena Medina (ESP)	4.2	8.750		12.950					12.575	R1
10	Marina Parente (POR)	3.6	8.950		12.550					12.250	R2

== Final ==
Rank	Gymnast	Vault 1				Vault 2				Total
Rank	Gymnast	D Score	E Score	Pen.	Score 1	D Score	E Score	Pen.	Score 2	Total
1st place, gold medalist(s)	Asia D'Amato (ITA)	5.0	8.850		13.850	4.8	9.100		13.900	13.875
2nd place, silver medalist(s)	Morgane Osyssek-Reimer (FRA)	4.6	9.000		13.600	4.4	8.800		13.200	13.400
3rd place, bronze medalist(s)	Angela Andreoli (ITA)	4.6	9.100		13.700	3.8	8.900		12.700	13.200
4	Tjaša Kysselef (SLO)	4.6	8.800		13.400	4.2	8.800		13.000	13.200
5	Tijana Korent (CRO)	4.2	8.600		12.800	4.2	8.800		13.000	12.900
6	Jana Mahmoud (EGY)	4.4	8.550		12.950	4.0	8.700		12.700	12.825
7	Bilge Tarhan (TUR)	4.2	8.800		13.000	4.0	8.400		12.400	12.700
8	Bengisu Yıldız (TUR)	4.2	8.400		12.600	3.8	8.200		12.000	12.300
