= Angela Andreoli =

Italian artistic gymnast

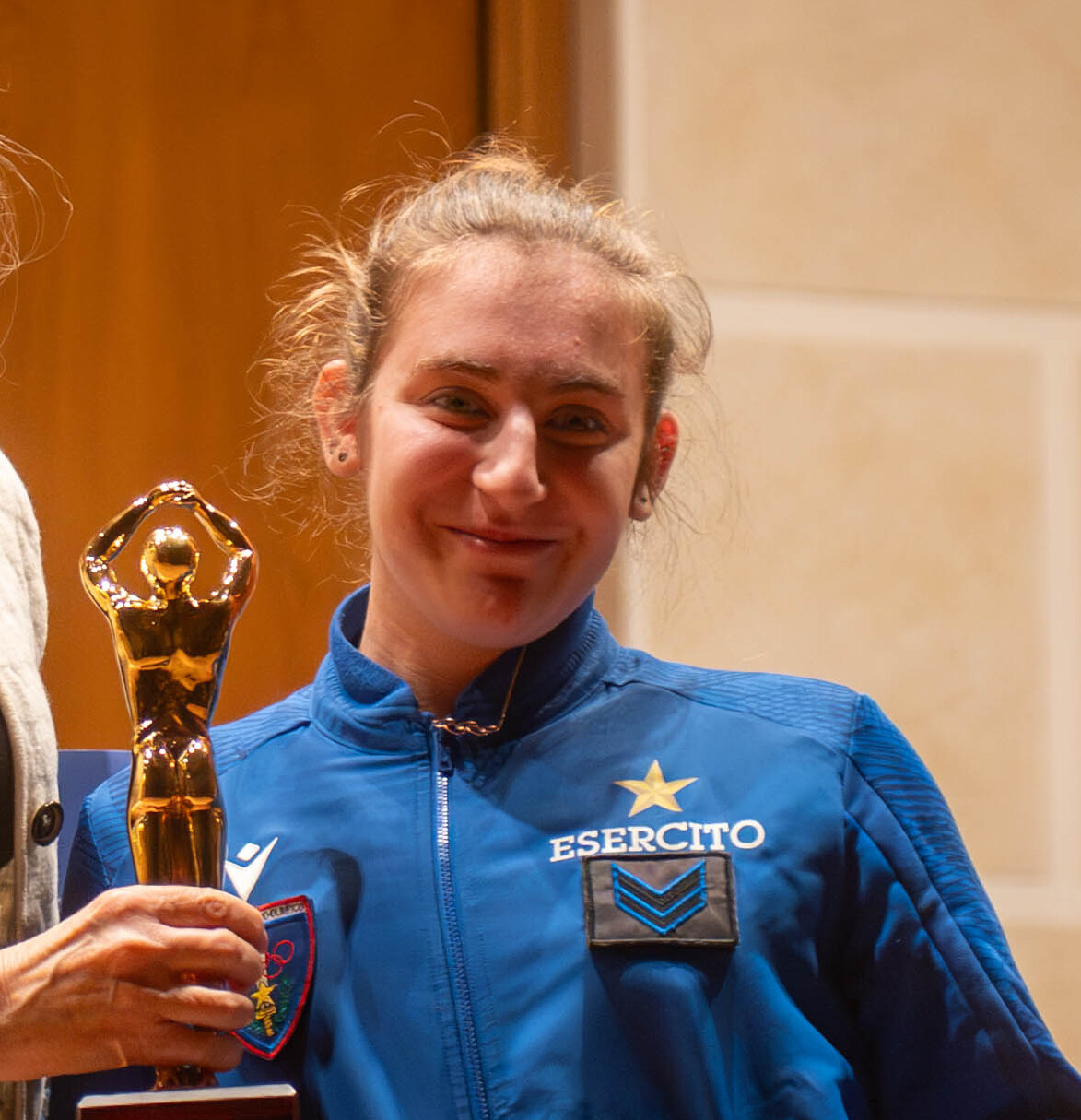
- Andreoli in 2024

Personal information
- Born: 6 June 2006 (age 20) Brescia, Italy

Gymnastics career
- Discipline: Women's artistic gymnastics
- Country represented: Italy (2017–present)
- Club: Centro Sportivo Esercito
- Gym: Brixia
- Head coach: Enrico Casella
Medal record
Women's artistic gymnastics
Representing Italy
Olympic Games
Silver medal – second place	2024 Paris	Team
European Championships
Gold medal – first place	2022 Munich	Team
Gold medal – first place	2024 Rimini	Team
Silver medal – second place	2023 Antalya	Team
Bronze medal – third place	2022 Munich	Floor Exercise
Bronze medal – third place	2024 Rimini	Floor Exercise
Mediterranean Games
Gold medal – first place	2022 Oran	Team
Gold medal – first place	2026 Taranto	Team
Bronze medal – third place	2022 Oran	Vault

Angela Andreoli (born 6 June 2006) is an Italian artistic gymnast. She was a member of the historic team that won silver at the 2024 Olympic Games. Additionally she was a member of the gold medal-winning teams at the 2022 Mediterranean Games, the 2022 European Championships, and the 2024 European Championships. Individually she is the 2022 Mediterranean Games bronze medalist on vault as well as the 2022 and 2024 European bronze medalist on floor exercise.

== Early life ==
Andreoli was born in Brescia, Italy in 2006. She currently trains at the International Academy of Brixia.

== Junior gymnastics career ==
=== Espoir: 2017–19 ===
Andreoli competed at the 2017 Tournoi International in the espoir division. She placed first in the all-around as well as on uneven bars, balance beam, and floor exercise. In 2018 Andreoli began competing in Serie A competitions alongside her club Brixia.

Andreoli competed at the 2019 City of Jesolo Trophy as part of the "Young Italy" team; they placed fourth. Individually Andreoli placed 16th in the all-around. At the Italian Gold Championships she won the all-around and earned the highest scores on all apparatuses except floor exercise, where she earned the second highest score. Andreoli ended the season competing at the Sainté Gym Cup. She placed third in the all-around behind Ondine Achampong of Great Britain and Alizée Letrange-Mouakit of France.

=== Junior: 2020–21 ===
At the 2020 Italian Gold Junior Championships Andreoli finished first. At the 2020 Italian National Championships Andreoli placed sixth in the all-around but was the highest scoring junior athlete.

At the 2021 Flanders International Team Challenge Andreoli finished third in the all-around but helped Italy finish first in the team competition. During event finals Andreoli had top three finishes on vault, uneven bars, and floor exercise. At Elite Gym Massilia Andreoli helped Italy finish first as a team and individually she won gold on floor exercise.

== Senior gymnastics career ==
=== 2022 ===
Andreoli became age-eligible for senior competition in 2022. She made her senior international debut at the DTB Pokal Team Challenge. Her scores on vault, uneven bars, and floor exercise contributed towards Italy's second-place finish. Individually Andreoli won gold on floor exercise ahead of Konnor McClain. Andreoli next competed at the City of Jesolo Trophy. She helped Italy finish second as a team and individually finished fourth on vault. In June Andreoli competed at the Mediterranean Games alongside Martina Maggio, Alice D'Amato, Asia D'Amato, and Giorgia Villa. Together they won gold in the team competition, over five points ahead of second place France. In August Andreoli competed at the European Championships where Italy won gold as a team. During event finals Andreoli won bronze on floor exercise behind Jessica Gadirova and teammate Maggio. In October it was revealed that Andreoli would miss out on competing at the World Championships due to injury.

=== 2023 ===
Andreoli competed at the 2023 European Championships alongside Alice D'Amato, Asia D'Amato, Manila Esposito, and Giorgia Villa; together they finished second as a team behind Great Britain. Andreoli was later selected to compete at the 2023 World Championships alongside D'Amato, Esposito, Elisa Iorio, and Arianna Belardelli. Andreoli contributed a score on balance beam towards Italy's fifth-place finish.

=== 2024 ===
Andreoli competed at the 2024 European Championships alongside Alice D'Amato, Asia D'Amato, Manila Esposito, and Elisa Iorio. On the first day of competition Andreoli recorded the third highest all-around score but did not medal due to two-per-country limitations since Esposito and D'Amato scored higher. During event finals she won bronze on floor exercise. On the final day of competition, the team final, Andreoli recorded scores on vault, balance beam, and floor exercise, helping Italy win their third European team title.

In July Andreoli competed at the Italian Championships where she won the national title on floor exercise. At the conclusion of the competition she was named to the team to represent Italy at the 2024 Summer Olympics alongside Alice D'Amato, Esposito, Iorio, and Giorgia Villa.

At the 2024 Olympic Games Andreoli helped Italy qualify to the team final in second place. During the team final Andreoli contributed a score on vault, balance beam, and floor exercise towards Italy's second-place finish, tying Italy's highest Olympic team placement. The last time the Italian women won an Olympic team medal was 96 years prior at the 1928 Olympic Games.

While competing at the Arthur Gander Memorial in November, Andreoli injured her knee and withdrew from the competition. It was later revealed that a bone in her knee became detached and she would require surgery to repair it.

== Competitive history ==
Competitive history of Angela Andreoli at the espoir level
Year	Event	Team	AA	VT	UB	BB	FX
2017	Tournoi International		1st place, gold medalist(s)		1st place, gold medalist(s)	1st place, gold medalist(s)	1st place, gold medalist(s)
2018	2nd Italian Serie A	1st place, gold medalist(s)					
2018	3rd Italian Serie A	1st place, gold medalist(s)					
2019	City of Jesolo Trophy	4	16				
2019	2nd Italian Serie A	1st place, gold medalist(s)				1st place, gold medalist(s)	
2019	Italian Gold Championships		1st place, gold medalist(s)	1st place, gold medalist(s)	1st place, gold medalist(s)	1st place, gold medalist(s)	2nd place, silver medalist(s)
2019	3rd Italian Serie A	1st place, gold medalist(s)					
2019	Sainté Gym Cup		3rd place, bronze medalist(s)				

Competitive history of Angela Andreoli at the junior level
Year	Event	Team	AA	VT	UB	BB	FX
2020	3rd Italian Serie A	1st place, gold medalist(s)				2nd place, silver medalist(s)	1st place, gold medalist(s)
2020	Italian Gold Junior Championships		1st place, gold medalist(s)				
2020	National Championships		6	3rd place, bronze medalist(s)		4	3rd place, bronze medalist(s)
2020	Italian Serie A Final Six	1st place, gold medalist(s)					
2021	1st Italian Serie A	1st place, gold medalist(s)			1st place, gold medalist(s)	1st place, gold medalist(s)	
2021	Italian Serie A Final Six	1st place, gold medalist(s)					
2021	FIT Challenge	1st place, gold medalist(s)	3rd place, bronze medalist(s)	2nd place, silver medalist(s)	3rd place, bronze medalist(s)		2nd place, silver medalist(s)
2021	National Championships		5	3rd place, bronze medalist(s)		5	1st place, gold medalist(s)
2021	Elite Gym Massilia	1st place, gold medalist(s)	9				1st place, gold medalist(s)
2021	Italian Gold Championships		1st place, gold medalist(s)	1st place, gold medalist(s)	1st place, gold medalist(s)	2nd place, silver medalist(s)	1st place, gold medalist(s)

Competitive history of Angela Andreoli at the senior level
Year	Event	Team	AA	VT	UB	BB	FX
2022	1st Italian Serie A	1st place, gold medalist(s)				1st place, gold medalist(s)	
2022	2nd Italian Serie A	1st place, gold medalist(s)		3rd place, bronze medalist(s)			1st place, gold medalist(s)
2022	DTB Pokal Team Challenge	2nd place, silver medalist(s)					1st place, gold medalist(s)
2022	City of Jesolo Trophy	2nd place, silver medalist(s)	16	4			
2022	Mediterranean Games	1st place, gold medalist(s)		3rd place, bronze medalist(s)			
2022	European Championships	1st place, gold medalist(s)					3rd place, bronze medalist(s)
2023	City of Jesolo Trophy	1st place, gold medalist(s)	3rd place, bronze medalist(s)				5
2023	European Championships	2nd place, silver medalist(s)					
2023	World Championships	5					
2024	City of Jesolo Trophy	1st place, gold medalist(s)	6			5	4
2024	European Championships	1st place, gold medalist(s)					3rd place, bronze medalist(s)
2024	Italian Championships		6				1st place, gold medalist(s)
2024	Olympic Games	2nd place, silver medalist(s)					
2024	Arthur Gander Memorial		DNF				
