= Gymnastics at the 2022 Mediterranean Games – Women's artistic team all-around =

Women's artistic team all-around at the 2022 Mediterranean Games
- Venue: Miloud Hadefi Complex Omnisport Arena
- Date: 26 June 2022
- Competitors: 37 from 8 nations
- Winning total: 161.950

Medalists
gold medal	Angela Andreoli; Alice D'Amato; Asia D'Amato; Martina Maggio; Giorgia Villa	Italy
silver medal	Lorette Charpy; Carolann Héduit; Djenna Laroui; Morgane Osyssek-Reimer; Célia Serber	France
bronze medal	Laura Casabuena; Emma Fernández; Lorena Medina; Alba Petisco; Claudia Villalba	Spain

The Women's artistic team all-around competition at the 2022 Mediterranean Games was held on 26 June 2022 at the Miloud Hadefi Complex Omnisport Arena.

== Qualified teams ==
The following NOCs competed as a team for the event.

- Algeria
- Egypt
- Spain
- France
- Italy
- Portugal
- Slovenia
- Turkey

== Final ==
Rank	Team	Vault (gymnastics)	Uneven bars	Balance beam	Floor (gymnastics)	Total
1st place, gold medalist(s)	Italy	41.300 (1)	41.250 (1)	40.700 (1)	38.700 (1)	161.950
1st place, gold medalist(s)	Angela Andreoli (ITA)	12.700		13.000	12.000	161.950
1st place, gold medalist(s)	Alice D'Amato (ITA)	13.800	12.750		11.200	161.950
1st place, gold medalist(s)	Asia D'Amato (ITA)	13.850	13.600	13.750	13.200	161.950
1st place, gold medalist(s)	Martina Maggio (ITA)	13.650	13.800	13.750	13.500	161.950
1st place, gold medalist(s)	Giorgia Villa (ITA)		13.850	13.200		161.950
2nd place, silver medalist(s)	France	40.200 (2)	39.950 (2)	40.100 (2)	36.350 (4)	156.600
2nd place, silver medalist(s)	Lorette Charpy (FRA)	13.150	13.650	13.200	11.500	156.600
2nd place, silver medalist(s)	Carolann Héduit (FRA)	13.750	13.500	13.500	12.000	156.600
2nd place, silver medalist(s)	Djenna Laroui (FRA)		12.350		11.200	156.600
2nd place, silver medalist(s)	Morgane Osyssek-Reimer (FRA)	13.300		13.400	12.850	156.600
2nd place, silver medalist(s)	Célia Serber (FRA)		12.800	12.100		156.600
3rd place, bronze medalist(s)	Spain	39.000 (3)	35.450 (5)	36.950 (3)	37.050 (2)	148.450
3rd place, bronze medalist(s)	Laura Casabuena (ESP)	11.600	11.550	12.700	12.550	148.450
3rd place, bronze medalist(s)	Emma Fernández (ESP)	12.850	11.450	12.250	12.150	148.450
3rd place, bronze medalist(s)	Lorena Medina (ESP)	12.950	11.850		12.000	148.450
3rd place, bronze medalist(s)	Alba Petisco (ESP)	13.200	12.050	10.650	12.350	148.450
3rd place, bronze medalist(s)	Claudia Villalba (ESP)			12.000		148.450
4	Turkey	38.800 (4)	36.400 (3)	35.100 (5)	36.400 (3)	146.700
4	Sevgi Kayışoğlu (TUR)		11.300	11.900	11.950	146.700
4	Nazlı Savranbaşı (TUR)	12.650	12.750			146.700
4	Bilge Tarhan (TUR)	12.900	11.850	11.250	11.600	146.700
4	Göksu Üçtaş Şanlı (TUR)	12.900		11.600	12.400	146.700
4	Bengisu Yıldız (TUR)	13.000	11.800	11.600	12.050	146.700
5	Portugal	37.050 (7)	36.350 (4)	35.700 (4)	34.200 (6)	143.300
5	Mafalda Costa (POR)	12.250	11.400	10.550	11.200	143.300
5	Ana Filipa Martins (POR)		13.850	12.450		143.300
5	Lia Sobral (POR)	12.250	11.100	11.250	11.450	143.300
5	Mariana Parente (POR)	12.550	10.850	12.000	11.550	143.300
6	Egypt	38.350 (6)	34.900 (7)	32.700 (6)	34.900 (5)	140.850
6	Jana Abdelsalam (EGY)	12.900	11.900	11.350	11.450	140.850
6	Jana Aboelhasan (EGY)	12.500	10.400	10.050	11.100	140.850
6	Jana Mahmoud (EGY)	12.950	11.800	9.250	11.900	140.850
6	Zeina Sharaf (EGY)		11.200	11.300		140.850
6	Nour Swidan (EGY)				11.550	140.850
7	Slovenia	38.450 (5)	35.000 (6)	32.700 (6)	22.950 (8)	129.100
7	Lucija Hribar (SLO)	13.000	12.850	11.650	11.650	129.100
7	Sara King (SLO)	12.000	9.750	9.350	11.300	129.100
7	Tjaša Kysselef (SLO)	13.450		11.700		129.100
7	Zala Trtnik (SLO)		12.400			129.100
8	Algeria	36.800 (8)	31.900 (8)	28.300 (8)	29.850 (7)	126.850
8	Fatima Boukhatem (ALG)	12.300	10.600	8.450	10.350	126.850
8	Sofia Nair (ALG)		9.300	9.300	9.200	126.850
8	Lahna Salem (ALG)	12.500	11.250	9.250	10.300	126.850
8	Sihem Hamidi (ALG)	12.000	10.050	9.750	8.800	126.850
