= Deniz Ertan =

Turkish swimmer (born 2004)

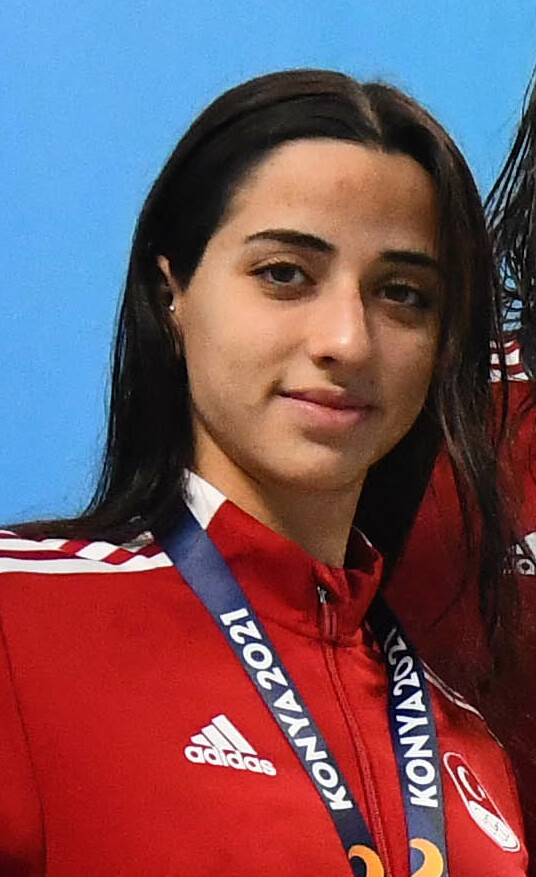
- Ertan in 2022

Personal information
- Born: 1 January 2004 (age 22)
- Height: 163
- Weight: 54

Sport
- Sport: Swimming
- Strokes: Freestyle, individual medley
- College team: Arizona State (2023–present); Georgia Tech (2022–2023)
Medal record
Women's swimming
Representing Turkey
European Championships (LC)
| Bronze medal – third place | 2024 Belgrade | 400 m freestyle |
| Bronze medal – third place | 2024 Belgrade | 800 m freestyle |
Islamic Solidarity Games
| Gold medal – first place | 2021 Konya | 100 m butterfly |
| Gold medal – first place | 2021 Konya | 400 m individual medley |
| Gold medal – first place | 2021 Konya | 4×200 m freestyle |
| Gold medal – first place | 2021 Konya | 4×100 m medley |
| Silver medal – second place | 2021 Konya | 800 m freestyle |
| Silver medal – second place | 2021 Konya | 1500 m freestyle |
| Silver medal – second place | 2021 Konya | 200 m individual medley |
Mediterranean Games
| Gold medal – first place | 2022 Oran | 400 m freestyle |
| Silver medal – second place | 2022 Oran | 800 m freestyle |
| Silver medal – second place | 2022 Oran | 400 m medley |
| Bronze medal – third place | 2022 Oran | 200 m medley |
| Bronze medal – third place | 2022 Oran | 4×200 m freestyle |
| Bronze medal – third place | 2022 Oran | 4×100 m medley |

Deniz Ertan (born 1 January 2004) is a Turkish swimmer specialized in freestyle swimming. She qualified for the 800 m freestyle event of the 2020 Summer Olympics. She also ranked third in the 800 m freestyle at the European Aquatics Championships on 18 June 2024. She is a member of Fenerbahçe Swimming.

While living in Ankara, Turkey, Ertan attended TED Ankara College. She won the bronze medal in the 200m individual medley event at the 2019 European Youth Summer Olympic Festival in Baku, Azerbaijan. After graduating in 2022, her collegiate swimming career began at Georgia Tech, where she swam under head coach Courtney Shealy Hart. From September 2023, she started swimming for coach Bob Bowman at Arizona State.

She won the bronze medal with 8:34.31 in the 800 m freestyle event at the 2024 European Aquatics Championships in Belgrade, Serbia, on 18 June 2024.
