= Defne Taçyıldız =

Turkish swimmer (born 2003)

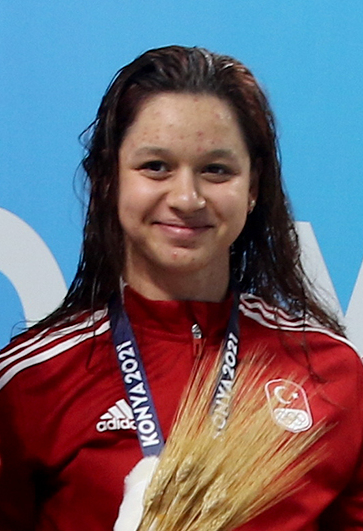

Personal information
- Nationality: Turkish
- Born: 5 February 2003 (age 23) Ankara, Turkey

Sport
- Sport: Swimming
Medal record
Women's swimming
Representing Turkey
Islamic Solidarity Games
Gold medal – first place	2021 Konya	200 m butterfly

Defne Taçyıldız (born 5 February 2003) is a Turkish swimmer. She competed in the women's 200 metre butterfly at the 2020 Summer Olympics.
