= Baturalp Ünlü =

Turkish Olympic swimmer (born 2002)

Personal information
- Nationality: Turkish
- Born: 9 July 2002 (age 23) Denizli, Turkey

Sport
- Sport: Swimming
- Strokes: Freestyle
- College team: Georgia Tech
Medal record
Men's swimming
Representing Turkey
Mediterranean Games
Bronze medal – third place	2022 Oran	4×200 m freestyle
Bronze medal – third place	2022 Oran	4×100 m medley
Islamic Solidarity Games
Gold medal – first place	2021 Konya	200 m freestyle
Gold medal – first place	2021 Konya	4x100 m freestyle
Gold medal – first place	2021 Konya	4x200 m freestyle
European Junior Championships
Bronze medal – third place	2019 Kazan	4×100 m medley

Baturalp Ünlü (born 9 July 2002) is a Turkish swimmer who specializes in freestyle events. He represented Turkey at the 2020 Summer Olympics in Tokyo, Japan, and has competed at European and world-level international competitions.

== Career ==
=== International competitions ===
Ünlü represented Turkey at the 2020 European Aquatics Championships in Budapest, Hungary, competing in the men's 200 metre freestyle.

He also represented Turkey at the 2020 Summer Olympics in Tokyo, Japan, where he competed in the men's 200 metre freestyle event.

Ünlü has competed at the FINA World Aquatics Championships and other international competitions as a member of the Turkish national swimming team.

=== Mediterranean Games ===
At the 2022 Mediterranean Games in Oran, Algeria, Ünlü won two bronze medals as part of the Turkish relay teams in the 4×200 metre freestyle relay and the 4×100 metre medley relay.

=== Islamic Solidarity Games ===
At the 2021 Islamic Solidarity Games in Konya, Turkey, Ünlü won three gold medals. He won the 200 metre freestyle and was also part of the Turkish teams that won the 4×100 metre freestyle relay and the 4×200 metre freestyle relay.

=== Collegiate career ===
Ünlü competed for the Georgia Tech Yellow Jackets swimming and diving team in the NCAA. During his collegiate career he specialized in freestyle events and represented Georgia Tech at the Atlantic Coast Conference (ACC) Championships and other NCAA competitions.

While swimming for Georgia Tech, he set the Turkish national record in the 400 metre freestyle.
