= Merve Tuncel =

Turkish swimmer (born 2005)

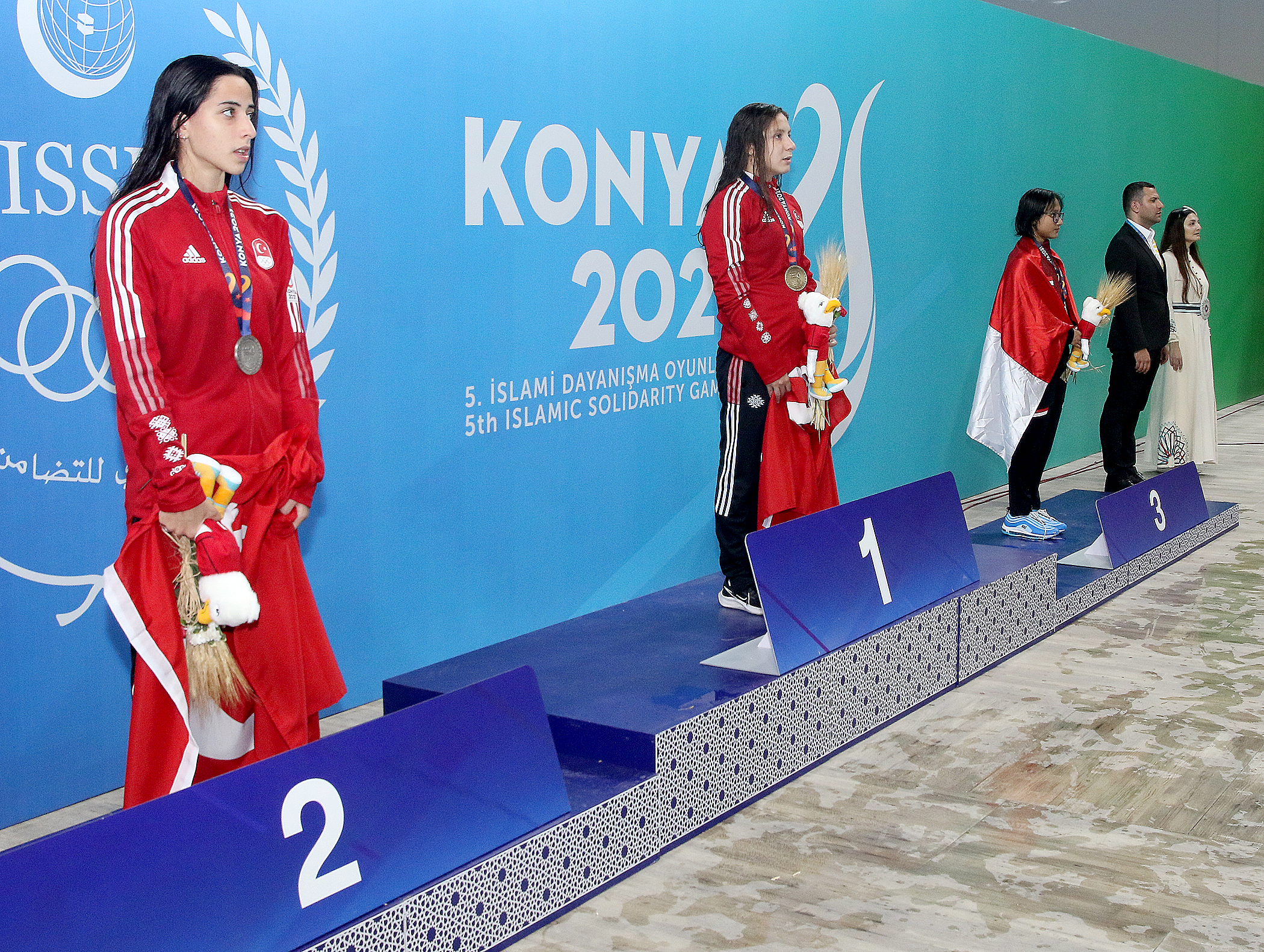

Personal information
- Born: 1 January 2005 (age 21) Ankara, Turkey
- Height: 165
- Weight: 58

Sport
- Sport: Swimming
- Strokes: Freestyle
- Club: Enka SK
Medal record
Women's swimming
Representing Turkey
Senior level
European Championships (LC)
Bronze medal – third place	2022 Rome	800 m freestyle
Islamic Solidarity Games
Gold medal – first place	2021 Konya	200 m freestyle
Gold medal – first place	2021 Konya	400 m freestyle
Gold medal – first place	2021 Konya	800 m freestyle
Gold medal – first place	2021 Konya	1500 m freestyle
Gold medal – first place	2021 Konya	4×100 m freestyle
Gold medal – first place	2021 Konya	4×200 m freestyle
Mediterranean Games
Gold medal – first place	2022 Oran	800 m freestyle
Bronze medal – third place	2022 Oran	200 m butterfly
Bronze medal – third place	2022 Oran	4×200 m freestyle
Youth level
World Junior Championships
Gold medal – first place	2022 Lima	400 m freestyle
Gold medal – first place	2022 Lima	800 m freestyle
Gold medal – first place	2022 Lima	1500 m freestyle
Bronze medal – third place	2022 Lima	4×200 m freestyle
European Junior Championships
Gold medal – first place	2021 Rome	400 m freestyle
Gold medal – first place	2021 Rome	800 m freestyle CR, EJR
Gold medal – first place	2021 Rome	1500 m freestyle CR, EJR
Gold medal – first place	2022 Otopeni	400 m freestyle
Gold medal – first place	2022 Otopeni	800 m freestyle
Gold medal – first place	2022 Otopeni	1500 m freestyle
Gold medal – first place	2023 Belgrade	800 m freestyle
Gold medal – first place	2023 Belgrade	1500 m freestyle
Silver medal – second place	2023 Belgrade	400 m freestyle
Bronze medal – third place	2021 Rome	4×200 m freestyle relay
Bronze medal – third place	2022 Otopeni	200 m freestyle
European Youth Summer Olympic Festival
Bronze medal – third place	2019 Baku	800 m freestyle

Merve Tuncel (born 1 January 2005) is a Turkish swimmer specialized in the freestyle swimming. She qualified for the 400m, 800m and 1500m freestyle events of the 2020 Summer Olympics. She is a member of Enka SK.

== Early years ==
Merve Tuncel was born to Sulhi and Adalet Tuncel in Ankara, Turkey on 1 January 2005. She is a student at George Washington University in Washington, D.C.

She liked to play with water in her very early youth years. She started swimming at Age 4 At age ten, she started to swim at the Turkey Olympic Preparation Center in Eryaman, Ankara under the Head Coach Gjon Shyti. From 2019 she swims for Enka SK. She's currently training at George Washington University.

== Swimming career ==
Tuncel won the silver medal in the 200m butterfly, and the bronze medal in the 800m freestyle at the 2019 European Youth Summer Olympic Festival in Baku, Azerbaijan. She broke the juniors world record at Istanbul, Turkey on 22 December 2020 in the short course 1500m freestyle swimming event with 15:45.29. She won gold medals in the events 400 m, 800 m, 1500 m, and the bronze medal in the 4 × 200 m freestyle relay event of the 2021 European Junior Swimming Championships in Rome, Italy. She set new championships record and European Juniors record with her times 8:21.91 in 800 m freestyle, and 15:55.23 in 1500 m freestyle.

Tuncel was the flag bearer for Turkey together with Berke Saka at the 2020 Summer Olympics opening ceremony.

== Summary (2019-July 2023) ==
Event	Gold	Silver	Bronze	Total
2019 European Youth Summer Olympic Festival	0	0	1	1
2021 European Junior Swimming Championships	3	0	1	4
2022 European Junior Swimming Championships	3	0	1	4
2023 European Junior Swimming Championships	2	1	0	3
2022 FINA World Junior Swimming Championships	3	0	1	4
Swimming at the 2022 Mediterranean Games	1	0	2	3
Swimming at the 2021 Islamic Solidarity Games	6	0	0	6
2022 European Aquatics Championships	0	0	1	1
Total	18	1	7	26

Olympic Games
Preceded by Rıza Kayaalp	Flagbearer for Turkey; Tokyo 2020 with Berke Saka	Succeeded by Incumbent
