= Italy at the 2022 Mediterranean Games =

Italy at multi-sport event

- IOC code: ITA
- NOC: Italian Olympic Committee
- Medals Ranked 1st: Gold 48 Silver 50 Bronze 61 Total 159

Mediterranean Games appearances (overview)
- 1951; 1955; 1959; 1963; 1967; 1971; 1975; 1979; 1983; 1987; 1991; 1993; 1997; 2001; 2005; 2009; 2013; 2018; 2022; 2026

Italy competed at the 2022 Mediterranean Games in Oran, Algeria from 25 June to 6 July 2022.

== Medalists ==
Medal	Name	Sport	Event	Date
Gold	Angela Andreoli; Alice D'Amato; Asia D'Amato; Martina Maggio; Giorgia Villa	Artistic gymnastics	Women's team	June 26
Gold	Martina Maggio	Artistic gymnastics	Women's individual all-around	June 28
Gold	Mattia Visconti; Marco Di Nicola	Boules	Raffa men's doubles	June 29
Gold	Mattia Visconti	Boules	Raffa men's single	June 29
Gold	Martina Maggio	Artistic gymnastics	Women's balance beam	June 29
Gold	Asia D'Amato	Artistic gymnastics	Women's floor	June 29
Gold	Nicola Bartolini	Artistic gymnastics	Men's vault	June 29
Gold	Giorgia Villa	Artistic gymnastics	Women's uneven bars	June 29
Gold	Asia D'Amato	Artistic gymnastics	Women's vault	June 29
Gold	Martina Bartolomei	Shooting	Women's skeet	June 29
Gold	Matteo Arnaldi; Francesco Passaro	Tennis	Men's doubles	June 30
Gold	Vittoria Guazzini	Cycling	Women's road time trial	June 30
Gold	Federico Musolesi	Archery	Men's individual	July 1
Gold	Andrea Federici; Matteo Melluzzo; Diego Aldo Pettorossi; Roberto Rigali	Athletics	Men's 4x100 metres relay	July 1
Gold	Rebecca Sartori	Athletics	Women's 400 metres hurdles	July 1
Gold	Irene Siragusa; Gloria Hooper; Aurora Berton; Johanelis Herrera Abreu	Athletics	Women's 4x100 metres relay	July 1
Gold	Giovanna Epis	Athletics	Women's half marathon	July 1
Gold	Federico Emilio Serra	Boxing	Men's flyweight	July 1
Gold	Aziz Abbes Mouhiidine	Boxing	Men's heavyweight	July 1
Gold	Giordana Sorrentino	Boxing	Women's light flyweight	July 1
Gold	Sara Franceschi	Swimming	Women's 400 metre individual medley	July 1
Gold	Francesco Passaro	Tennis	Men's single	July 1
Gold	Giulia Imperio	Weightlifting	Women's 49 kg snatch	July 1
Gold	Giulia Imperio	Weightlifting	Women's 49 kg clean & jerk	July 1
Gold	Barbara Guarischi	Cycling	Women's road race	July 2
Gold	Filippo Megli	Swimming	Men's 100 metre freestyle	July 2
Gold	Pier Andrea Matteazzi	Swimming	Men's 400 metre individual medley	July 2
Gold	Fabio Scozzoli	Swimming	Men's 50 metre breaststroke	July 2
Gold	Lisa Angiolini	Swimming	Women's 100 metre breaststroke	July 2
Gold	Lucrezia Magistris	Weightlifting	Women's 59 kg snatch	July 2
Gold	Mirko Zanni	Weightlifting	Men's 73 kg snatch	July 2
Gold	Antonino Pizzolato	Weightlifting	Men's 89 kg snatch	July 3
Gold	Antonino Pizzolato	Weightlifting	Men's 89 kg clean & jerk	July 3
Gold	Anna Polinari; Virginia Troiani; Raphaela Boaheng Lukudo; Giancarla Trevisan	Athletics	Women's 4x400 metres relay	July 3
Gold	Nicolò Renna	Sailing	Men's iQFOiL	July 3
Gold	Luca Serio; Alessandro Bori; Giovanni Carraro; Filippo Megli	Swimming	Men's 4x100 metre relay freestyle	July 3
Gold	Simone Stefani	Swimming	Men's 50 metre backstroke	July 3
Gold	Giulia Rizzi	Fencing	Women's épee	July 4
Gold	Claudio Faraci	Swimming	Men's 200 metre butterfly	July 4
Gold	Lorenzo Mora; Alessandro Pinzuti; Matteo Rivolta; Alessandro Bori; Matteo Restivo; Alessandro Fusco; Simone Stefanì; Filippo Megli	Swimming	Men's 4 × 100 metre medley relay	July 4
Gold	Carlotta Zofkova; Lisa Angiolini; Ilaria Bianchi; Sofia Morini	Swimming	Women's 4 × 100 metre medley relay	July 4
Gold	Sara Franceschi	Swimming	Women's 200 metre individual medley	July 4
Gold	Lisa Angiolini	Swimming	Women's 50 metre breaststroke	July 4
Gold	Francesca Bosio; Ilaria Battistoni; Sofia D'Odorico; Federica Squarcini; Sara Panetoni; Nkemdilim Terry Enweonwu; Elena Perinelli; Alessia Mazzaro; Emma Cagnin; Binto Diop; Giorgia Frosini; Linda Nkiruka Nwakalor	Volleyball	Women's tournament	July 4
Gold	Olga Rachele Calissi	Fencing	Women's foil	July 5
Gold	Matteo Rivolta	Swimming	Men's 100 metre butterfly	July 5
Gold	Lorenzo Mora	Swimming	Men's 200 metre backstroke	July 5
Gold	Filippo Megli	Swimming	Men's 200 metre freestyle	July 5
Silver	Luca Maresca	Karate	Men's 67 kg	June 26
Silver	Katharina Fink; Yasmine Hamza	Badminton	Women's doubles	June 27
Silver	Nicola Bartolini; Lorenzo Casali; Lay Giannini; Matteo Levantesi; Marco Lodadio	Artistic gymnastics	Men's team	June 27
Silver	Silvia Semeraro	Karate	Women's 68 kg	June 27
Silver	Nicole Arlia; Giorgia Piccolin; Nikoleta Stefanova	Table tennis	Women's team	June 27
Silver	Asia D'Amato	Artistic gymnastics	Women's individual all-around	June 28
Silver	Abraham Conyedo	Wrestling	Men's Freestyle 125 kg	June 28
Silver	Luigi Grattapaglia	Boules	Lyonnaise men's precision shooting	June 29
Silver	Stefano Pegoraro	Boules	Lyonnaise men's progressive shooting	June 29
Silver	Valentina Basei	Boules	Lyonnaise women's precision shooting	June 29
Silver	Flavia Morelli; Ilaria Treccani	Boules	Raffa women's doubles	June 29
Silver	Matteo Levantesi	Artistic gymnastics	Men's parallel bars	June 29
Silver	Nicola Bartolini	Artistic gymnastics	Men's vault	June 29
Silver	Asia D'Amato	Artistic gymnastics	Women's balance beam	June 29
Silver	Martina Maggio	Artistic gymnastics	Women's floor	June 29
Silver	Martina Maggio	Artistic gymnastics	Women's uneven bars	June 29
Silver	Matteo Piras	Judo	Men's 66 kg	June 29
Silver	Giulia Caggiano	Judo	Women's 57 kg	June 29
Silver	Diana Bacosi; Tommaso Cassandro	Shooting	Mixed skeet team	June 30
Silver	Kenny Komi Bedel	Judo	Men's 81 kg	June 30
Silver	Tobia Bocchi	Athletics	Men's triple jump	June 30
Silver	Lucilla Boari	Archery	Women's individual	July 1
Silver	Lucilla Boari; Tatiana Andreoli; Chiara Rebagliati	Archery	Women's team	July 1
Silver	Lucilla Boari; Mauro Nespoli	Archery	Mixed team	July 1
Silver	Gianluigi Malanga	Boxing	Men's light welterweight	July 1
Silver	Vincenzo Fiaschetti	Boxing	Men's super heavyweight	July 1
Silver	Assunta Canfora	Boxing	Women's light welterweight	July 1
Silver	Lorenzo Mora	Swimming	Men's 100 metre backstroke	July 1
Silver	Matteo Rivolta	Swimming	Men's 50 metre butterfly	July 1
Silver	Nuria Brancaccio	Tennis	Women's single	July 1
Silver	Eloisa Coiro	Athletics	Women's 800 metres	July 2
Silver	Anita Bottazzo	Swimming	Women's 100 metre breaststroke	July 2
Silver	Viola Scotto Di Carlo	Swimming	Women's 50 metre butterfly	July 2
Silver	Lucrezia Magistris	Weightlifting	Women's 59 kg clean & jerk	July 2
Silver	Diego Aldo Pettorossi	Athletics	Men's 200 metres	July 3
Silver	Pietro Pivotto; Giuseppe Leonardi; Lapo Bianciardi; Matteo Raimondi	Athletics	Men's 4x400 metres relay	July 3
Silver	Federica Del Buono	Athletics	Women's 1500 metres	July 3
Silver	Nicla Mosetti	Athletics	Women's 100 metres hurdles	July 3
Silver	Riccardo Nuccio	Fencing	Men's sabre	July 3
Silver	Chiara Mormile	Fencing	Women's sabre	July 3
Silver	Marta Maggetti	Sailing	Women's iQFOiL	July 3
Silver	Chiara Benini Floriani	Sailing	Women's laser radial	July 3
Silver	Linda Caponi; Antonietta Cesarano; Noemi Cesarano; Alice Mizzau	Swimming	Women's 4x200 metre relay freestyle	July 3
Silver	Davide Mastrantonio; Filippo Missori; Iacopo Regonesi; Andrea Palella; Lorenzo Dellavalle; Gabriele Indragoli; Luis Hasa; Justin Kumi; Tommaso Mancini; Federico Accornero; Nicola Patané; Nicola Bagnolini; Andrea Bozzolan; Gabriele Guarino; Lorenzo Amatucci; Lorenzo Ignacchiti; Luca D'Andrea; Antonio Raimondo	Football	Men's tournament	July 4
Silver	Valerio Cuomo	Fencing	Men's épee	July 4
Silver	Nicol Foietta	Fencing	Women's épee	July 4
Silver	Matteo Restivo	Swimming	Men's 200 metre backstroke	July 5
Silver	Carlotta Zofkova	Swimming	Women's 100 metre backstroke	July 5
Bronze	Luigi Busà	Karate	Men's 75 kg	June 26
Bronze	Veronica Brunori	Karate	Women's 55 kg	June 26
Bronze	Alessandra Mangiacapra	Karate	Women's 61 kg	June 26
Bronze	Mirco Minguzzi	Wrestling	Men's Greco-Roman 87 kg	June 27
Bronze	Fabio Caponio; Giovanni Toti	Badminton	Men's doubles	June 27
Bronze	Ruben Marvice	Wrestling	Men's Greco-Roman 60 kg	June 27
Bronze	Serena Traversa	Boules	Lyonnaise women's progressive shooting	June 28
Bronze	Studd Obispado Morris	Wrestling	Men's Freestyle 57 kg	June 28
Bronze	Dalma Caneva	Wrestling	Women's Freestyle 68 kg	June 29
Bronze	Enrica Rinaldi	Wrestling	Women's Freestyle 76 kg	June 29
Bronze	Saverio Amormino; Andrea Chiapello	Boules	Pétanque men's doubles	June 29
Bronze	Flavia Morelli	Boules	Raffa women's single	June 29
Bronze	Matteo Levantesi	Artistic gymnastics	Men's vault	June 29
Bronze	Angela Andreoli	Artistic gymnastics	Women's vault	June 29
Bronze	Diana Bacosi	Shooting	Women's skeet	June 29
Bronze	Luca Tesconi; Chiara Giancamilli	Shooting	Mixed 10 metre air pistol team	June 29
Bronze	Martina Bartolomei; Gabriele Rossetti	Shooting	Mixed skeet team	June 30
Bronze	Nuria Brancaccio; Aurora Zantedeschi	Tennis	Women's doubles	June 30
Bronze	Martina Esposito	Judo	Women's 70 kg	June 30
Bronze	Melissa Gemini	Boxing	Women's welterweight	June 30
Bronze	Rebecca Nicoli	Boxing	Women's lightweight	June 30
Bronze	Salvatore Cavallaro	Boxing	Men's middleweight	June 30
Bronze	Giuseppe Canonico	Boxing	Men's lightweight	June 30
Bronze	Mauro Nespoli	Archery	Men's individual	July 1
Bronze	Giorgio Olivieri	Athletics	Men's hammer throw	July 1
Bronze	Lorenzo Agro Sylvain	Judo	Men's +100 kg	July 1
Bronze	Luca Tesconi	Shooting	Men's 10 metre air pistol	July 1
Bronze	Ossama Meslek	Athletics	Men's 1500 metres	July 2
Bronze	Virginia Troiani	Athletics	Women's 400 metres	July 2
Bronze	Alessandro Bori	Swimming	Men's 100 metre freestyle	July 2
Bronze	Pietro Paolo Sarpe	Swimming	Men's 400 metre individual medley	July 2
Bronze	Alice Mizzau	Swimming	Women's 200 metre freestyle	July 2
Bronze	Sonia Laquintana	Swimming	Women's 50 metre butterfly	July 2
Bronze	Martina Rita Caramignoli	Swimming	Women's 800 metre freestyle	July 2
Bronze	Mirko Zanni	Weightlifting	Men's 73 kg clean & jerk	July 2
Bronze	Catilin Tecuceanu	Athletics	Men's 800 metres	July 3
Bronze	Italo Quazzola	Athletics	Men's 5000 metres	July 3
Bronze	Ludovica Cavalli	Athletics	Women's 1500 metres	July 3
Bronze	Marta Morara	Athletics	Women's high jump	July 3
Bronze	Giulia Bongiorno; Beatrice Del Pero; Sara Madera; Giovanna Elena Smorto	Basketball	Women's tournament	July 3
Bronze	Dario Cavaliere	Fencing	Men's sabre	July 3
Bronze	Rebecca Gargano	Fencing	Women's sabre	July 3
Bronze	Eloisa Passaro	Fencing	Women's sabre	July 3
Bronze	Giovanni Coccoluto Giorgietti	Sailing	Laser	July 3
Bronze	Luca Di Tomassi	Sailing	Men's iQFOiL	July 3
Bronze	Silvana Maria Stanco	Shooting	Women's trap	July 3
Bronze	Pier Andrea Matteazzi	Swimming	Men's 200 metre individual medley	July 3
Bronze	Luca De Tullio	Swimming	Men's 400 metre freestyle	July 3
Bronze	Lorenzo Mora	Swimming	Men's 50 metre backstroke	July 3
Bronze	Roberto Botta	Taekwondo	Men's +80 kg	July 3
Bronze	Giada Al Halwani	Taekwondo	Women's 57 kg	July 3
Bronze	Giacomo Paolini	Fencing	Men's épee	July 4
Bronze	Matteo Tagliariol	Fencing	Men's épee	July 4
Bronze	Roberta Marzani	Fencing	Women's épee	July 4
Bronze	Anita Bottazzo	Swimming	Women's 50 metre breaststroke	July 4
Bronze	Ilaria Bianchi	Swimming	Women's 100 metre butterfly	July 4
Bronze	Leonardo Ferrato; Francesco Recine; Federico Crosato; Alberto Pol; Marco Falaschi; Davide Gardini; Giulio Magalini; Gabriele Di Martino; Fabrizio Gironi; Andrea Schiro; Damiano Catania; Marco Vitelli	Volleyball	Men's tournament	July 4
Bronze	Cristiano Giuseppe Ficco	Weightlifting	Men's 102 kg snatch	July 4
Bronze	Davide Filippi	Fencing	Men's foil	July 5
Bronze	Edoardo Valsecchi	Swimming	Men's 100 metre butterfly	July 5
Bronze	Alessandro Pinzuti	Swimming	Men's 100 metre breaststroke	July 5
Bronze	Antonietta Cesarano	Swimming	Women's 400 metre freestyle	July 5
Bronze	Sonia Laquintana; Alice Mizzau; Viola Scotto di Carlo; Sofia Morini	Swimming	Women's 4 × 100 metre freestyle relay	July 5

== Archery ==
Men

Athlete	Event	Ranking round		Round of 24	Round of 16	Round of 8	Quarterfinals	Semifinals	Final / BM	
Athlete	Event	Score	Seed	Opposition Score	Opposition Score	Opposition Score	Opposition Score	Opposition Score	Opposition Score	Rank
Federico Musolesi	Individual	661	3	—N/a	Aly (EGY); W 7–1	Remar (CRO); W 6–0	Alvarino Garcia (ESP); W 6–4	Nespoli (ITA); W 6-2	Gazoz (TUR); W 4-6	1st place, gold medalist(s)
Mauro Nespoli	Individual	667	2	—N/a	Rahlaoui (ALG); W 0–6	Bariteaud (FRA); W 3–7	Fichet (FRA); W 1–6	Musolesi (ITA); L 6-2	Bernardi (FRA); W 3-7	3rd place, bronze medalist(s)
Alessandro Paoli	Individual	641	11	—N/a	Gllareva (KOS); W 6–4	Alvarino Garcia (ESP); L 1–7	did not advance			9
Federico Musolesi; Mauro Nespoli; Alessandro Paoli	Team			—N/a	—N/a	—N/a	Cyprus (CYP); W 6–0	France (FRA); L 0–6	Turkey (TUR); L 4–5	4

Women

Athlete	Event	Ranking round		Round of 24	Round of 16	Round of 8	Quarterfinals	Semifinals	Final / BM	
Athlete	Event	Score	Seed	Opposition Score	Opposition Score	Opposition Score	Opposition Score	Opposition Score	Opposition Score	Rank
Lucilla Boari	Individual	637	7	—N/a	Yassen (EGY); W 6–0	Kourouna (CYP); W 6–2	Psarra (GRE); W 6–4	Florent (FRA); W 0-6	Fernandez Infante (ESP); L 7-1	2nd place, silver medalist(s)
Tatiana Andreoli	Individual	634	9	—N/a	Azzam (EGY); W 6–2	Fernandez Infante (ESP); L 2–6	did not advance			9
Chiara Rebagliati	Individual	629	11	—N/a	Bellal (ALG); W 6–2	Coskun (ESP); L 0–6	did not advance			9
Lucilla Boari; Tatiana Andreoli; Chiara Rebagliati	Team			—N/a	—N/a	—N/a	Cyprus (CYP); W 0–6	Greece (GRE); W 0–6	Turkey (TUR); L 5–3	2nd place, silver medalist(s)

Mixed

Athlete	Event	Ranking round		Round of 8	Quarterfinals	Semifinals	Final / BM	
Athlete	Event	Score	Seed	Opposition Score	Opposition Score	Opposition Score	Opposition Score	Rank
Lucilla Boari; Mauro Nespoli	Team			—N/a	Tunisia (TUN); W 0–6	Greece (GRE); W 0–6	Turkey (TUR); L 5–3	2nd place, silver medalist(s)

== Artistic gymnastics ==
Italy competed in artistic gymnastics.

Women
Team

Athlete	Event	Final					
Athlete	Event	Apparatus				Total	Rank
Athlete	Event	VT	UB	BB	FX	Total	Rank
Angela Andreoli	Team	12.700 Q	—N/a	13.000	12.000	—N/a	
Alice D'Amato	Team	13.800	12.750	—N/a	11.200	—N/a	
Asia D'Amato	Team	13.850 Q	13.600	13.750 Q	13.200 Q	54.400	2 Q
Martina Maggio	Team	13.650	13.800 Q	13.750 Q	13.500 Q	54.700	1 Q
Giorgia Villa	Team	—N/a	13.850 Q	13.200	—N/a	—N/a	
Total	Team	41.300	41.250	40.700	38.700	161.950	1st place, gold medalist(s)

Individual

Athlete	Event	Final					
Athlete	Event	Apparatus				Total	Rank
Athlete	Event	VT	UB	BB	FX	Total	Rank
Asia D'Amato	All-around	14.033	13.833	13.366	12.833	54.065	2nd place, silver medalist(s)
Martina Maggio	All-around	13.666	13.666	13.966	13.566	54.864	1st place, gold medalist(s)

Apparatus

Athlete	Event	Total	Rank
Angela Andreoli	Vault	13.200	3rd place, bronze medalist(s)
Asia D'Amato	Vault	13.875	1st place, gold medalist(s)
Martina Maggio	Uneven Bars	13.850	2nd place, silver medalist(s)
Giorgia Villa	Uneven Bars	14.000	1st place, gold medalist(s)
Asia D'Amato	Balance Beam	13.250	2nd place, silver medalist(s)
Martina Maggio	Balance Beam	13.550	1st place, gold medalist(s)
Asia D'Amato	Floor Exercise	13.500	1st place, gold medalist(s)
Martina Maggio	Floor Exercise	13.300	2nd place, silver medalist(s)

Men
Team

Key:

- F - Floor
- PH - Pommel horse
- R - Rings
- V - Vault
- PB - Parallel bars
- HB - Horizontal bar

Athlete	Event	Final							
Athlete	Event	Apparatus						Total	Rank
Athlete	Event	F	PH	R	V	PB	HB	Total	Rank
Nicola Bartolini	Team	14.600	13.700	12.900	14.650	14.050	13.250	83.150	3
Lorenzo Casali	Team	13.300	12.950	13.300	14.300	14.150	13.250	81.250	7
Matteo Levantesi	Team	11.300	12.650	13.000	14.400	14.750	13.600	79.700	9
Lay Giannini	Team	—N/a	11.700	—N/a	—N/a	14.350	13.200	39.250	40
Marco Lodadio	Team	3.100	—N/a	14.600	13.600	—N/a	—N/a	31.300	41
Total	Team	39.200	39.300	40.900	43.350	43.250	40.100	246.100	2nd place, silver medalist(s)

Individual finals

Athlete	Event	Apparatus						Total	Rank
Athlete	Event	F	PH	R	V	PB	HB	Total	Rank
Nicola Bartolini	Floor	14.850	—N/a					14.850	1st place, gold medalist(s)
Nicola Bartolini	Pommel horse	—N/a	13.950	—N/a				13.950	4
Marco Lodadio	Rings	—N/a		14.600	—N/a			14.600	4
Nicola Bartolini	Vault	—N/a			14.475	—N/a		14.475	2nd place, silver medalist(s)
Matteo Levantesi	Vault	—N/a			14.200	—N/a		14.200	3rd place, bronze medalist(s)
Matteo Levantesi	Parallel bars	—N/a				14.500	—N/a	14.500	2nd place, silver medalist(s)
Lay Giannini	Parallel bars	—N/a				12.800	—N/a	12.800	8
Matteo Levantesi	Horizontal bar	—N/a					13.450	13.450	5
Lorenzo Casali	All around	13.150	13.000	13.500	14.600	14.100	13.250	81.600	4
Nicola Bartolini	All around	14.200	13.100	13.100	13.200	13.950	13.300	80.850	7

== Athletics ==
Italy competed in athletics.

Key

- Note – Ranks given for track events are within the athlete's heat only
- Q = Qualified for the next round
- q = Qualified for the next round as a fastest loser or, in field events, by position without achieving the qualifying target
- NR = National record
- N/A = Round not applicable for the event
- Bye = Athlete not required to compete in round

}}

Men
Track & road events

Athlete	Event	Semifinal		Final	
Athlete	Event	Result	Rank	Result	Rank
Matteo Melluzzo	100 m	10.36	1 Q	10.28	4
Roberto Rigali	100 m	10.41	4 q	10.39	6
Francesco Ferrante	110 m hurdles	13.88	4 q	14.27	8
Lorenzo Ndele Simonelli	110 m hurdles	13.72	4 q	13.59	5
Ossama Meslek	1500 m	—N/a		3:42.49	3rd place, bronze medalist(s)
Pietro Arese	1500 m	—N/a		3:42.80	4
Diego Pettorossi	200 m	20.55	1 Q	20.65	2nd place, silver medalist(s)
Andrea Federici	200 m	21.05	2 Q	21.25	7
Giovanni Gatti	3000 m steeplechase	—N/a		8:46.77	11
Lapo Bianciardi	400 m	46.33	3 q	47.02	7
Giuseppe Leonardi	400 m	47.01	3	Did not advance	
José Reynaldo Bencosme de Leon	400 m hurdles	49.55	1 Q	48.91	4
Mario Lambrughi	400 m hurdles	50.32	4 q	49.29	5
Italo Quazzola	5000 m	—N/a		13:37.63	3rd place, bronze medalist(s)
Dario De Caro	5000 m	—N/a		13:37.63	9
Catalin Tecuceanu	800 m	1:47.10	1 Q	1:44.97	3rd place, bronze medalist(s)
Simone Barontini	800 m	1:46.89	3 q	1:45.92	6
Andrea Federici; Diego Pettorossi; Matteo Melluzzo; Roberto Rigali	4x100 m relay	—N/a		38.95	1st place, gold medalist(s)
Pietro Pivotto; Giuseppe Leonardi; Lapo Bianciardi; Matteo Raimondi	4x400 m relay	—N/a		3:04.55	2nd place, silver medalist(s)

Field events

Athlete	Event	Qualification		Final	
Athlete	Event	Result	Rank	Result	Rank
Nazzareno Di Marco	Discus throw	—N/a		59.52	6
Giovanni Faloci	Discus throw	—N/a		57.30	10
Giorgio Olivieri	Hammer throw	—N/a		72.18	3rd place, bronze medalist(s)
Marco Lingua	Hammer throw	—N/a		70.70	6
Roberto Orlando	Javelin throw	—N/a		74.27	5
Marco Fassinotti	High jump	—N/a		2.19	7
Christian Falocchi	High jump	—N/a		2.16	8
Gabriele Chilà	Long jump	—N/a		7.58	7
Jacopo Quarratesi	Long jump	—N/a		7.41	9
Tobia Bocchi	Triple jump	—N/a		16.93	2nd place, silver medalist(s)
Andrea Dallavalle	Triple jump	—N/a		16.44	5
Sebastiano Bianchetti	Shot put	—N/a		20.03	6
Riccardo Ferrara	Shot put	—N/a		19.18	9
Max Mandusic	Pole vault	—N/a		5.30	6
Ivan De Angelis	Pole vault	—N/a		DNS	

Women
Track & road events

Athlete	Event	Semifinal		Final	
Athlete	Event	Result	Rank	Result	Rank
Gloria Hooper	100 m	11.59	3 Q	11.62	5
Giorgia Bellinazzi	100 m	11.75	3 Q	11.71	7
Elena Carraro	100 m hurdles	13.15	1 Q	13.67	7
Nicla Mosetti	100 m hurdles	13.02	1 Q	13.22	2nd place, silver medalist(s)
Federica Del Buono	1500 m	—N/a		4:13.09	2nd place, silver medalist(s)
Ludovica Cavalli	1500 m	—N/a		4:13.37	3rd place, bronze medalist(s)
Maya Fonda Bruney	200 m	23.66	3 Q	23.81	8
Irene Siragusa	200 m	23.59	3 Q	23.27	4
Martina Merlo	3000 m steeplechase	—N/a		9:38.84	5
Anna Arnaudo	3000 m steeplechase	—N/a		10:22.46	10
Giovanna Selva	5000 m	—N/a		16:08.71	7
Virginia Troiani	400 m	—N/a		53.14	3rd place, bronze medalist(s)
Raphaela Boaheng Lukudo	400 m	—N/a		53.37	4
Alice Muraro	400 m hurdles	57.20	2 Q	57.12	7
Rebecca Sartori	400 m hurdles	56.55	1 Q	55.75	1st place, gold medalist(s)
Joyce Mattagliano	800 m	2:06.85	4	Did not advance	
Eloisa Coiro	800 m	2:03.16	2 Q	2:01.40	2nd place, silver medalist(s)
Aurora Berton; Gloria Hooper; Irene Siragusa; Johanelis Herrera Abreu	4x100 m relay	—N/a		43.68	1st place, gold medalist(s)
Anna Polinari; Virginia Troiani; Raphaela Boaheng Lukudo; Giancarla Dimich Trevisan	4x400 m relay	—N/a		3:29.93	1st place, gold medalist(s)
Giovanna Epis	Half marathon	—N/a		1:13:47	1st place, gold medalist(s)
Rebecca Lonedo	Half marathon	—N/a		1:15:49	7

Field events

Athlete	Event	Final	
Athlete	Event	Result	Rank
Stefania Strumillo	Discus throw	55.93	4
Diletta Fortuna	Discus throw	50.98	6
Lucia Prinetti Anzalapya	Hammer throw	63.91	7
Nadia Maffo	Hammer throw	61.82	10
Sara Zabarino	Javelin throw	53.98	5
Carolina Visca	Javelin throw	52.18	6
Marta Morara	High jump	1.87	3rd place, bronze medalist(s)
Erika Furlani	High jump	1.84	8
Laura Strati	Long jump	6.14	8

== Badminton ==
Italy competed in badminton.

Men

Athlete	Event	Round of 32	Round of 16	Quarterfinals	Semifinals	Final	
Athlete	Event	Opposition Result	Opposition Result	Opposition Result	Opposition Result	Opposition Result	Rank
Fabio Caponio	Singles	Kattirtzi Ranjbar (CYP); W (21–5, 21–7)	Tsamousiadis (GRE); W (21–5, 21–12)	Krapež (SLO); L (25–27, 21–6, 17–21)	did not advance		
Giovanni Toti	Singles	Špoljarec (CRO); W (21–16, 21–9)	Ivanič (SLO); W (22–20, 21–9)	Lale (TUR); L (13–21, 13–21)	did not advance		
Fabio Caponio; Giovanni Toti	Doubles	—N/a	—N/a	Portugal (POR); W (21–11, 21–8)	Spain (ESP); L (21–17, 15–21, 19–21)	Did not advance	3rd place, bronze medalist(s)

Women

Athlete	Event	Round of 32	Round of 16	Quarterfinals	Semifinals	Final	
Athlete	Event	Opposition Result	Opposition Result	Opposition Result	Opposition Result	Opposition Result	Rank
Yasmine Hamza	Singles	Polanc (SLO); W (21–14, 21–15)	Bouksani (ALG); W (21–11, 21–15)	Yiğit (TUR); L (10–21, 12–21)	did not advance		
Katharina Fink	Singles	Cloteaux-Foucault (FRA); W (21–18, 13–21, 21–12)	Lončar (SRB); W WDN	Bayrak (TUR); L (14–21, 10–21)	did not advance		
Katharina Fink; Yasmine Hamza	Doubles	—N/a	—N/a	Slovenia (SLO); W (21–18, 21–13)	Cyprus (CYP); W (21–16, 21–17)	Turkey (TUR); L (15–21, 18–21)	2nd place, silver medalist(s)

== Basketball ==
Italy won the bronze medal in the women's tournament. Italy also competed in the men's tournament.

Athlete	Event	Group matches				Quarterfinals	Semifinals	Final / BM	
Athlete	Event	Opposition Score	Opposition Score	Opposition Score	Rank	Opposition Score	Opposition Score	Opposition Score	Rank
Antonio Gallo; Fabio Valentini; Riccardo Chinellato; Michele Serpilli	Men's Tournament	—N/a	(Turkey) Turkey; L 10–21	(Algeria) Algeria; W 21–16	3	—N/a	(Slovenia) Slovenia; W 21–18	(Egypt) Turkey; L 9–11	10
Giulia Bongiorno; Beatrice Del Pero; Sara Madera; Giovanna Elena Smorto	Women's Tournament	(Egypt) Egypt; W 15–4	(Tunisia) Tunisia; W 17–12	(France) France; L 9–13	2	(Serbia) Serbia; W 17–11	(Spain) Spain; L 11–16	(Turkey) Turkey; W 14–12	2nd place, silver medalist(s)

== Boules ==
Italy competed in boules.

Lyonnaise

Athlete	Event	Heats				Quarterfinals	Semifinals	Final / BM	
Athlete	Event	Heat 1	Heat 2	Total	Rank	Opposition Score	Opposition Score	Opposition Score	Rank
Luigi Grattapaglia	Men's precision throw	21	20	41	3 Q	Svara (SLO); W 24-15	Kovacevic (SRB); W 23-12	Belay (FRA); L 24-28	2nd place, silver medalist(s)
Valentina Basei	Women's precision throw	3	16	19	4 Q	Mhamdi Ep Jbeli (TUN); W 19-18	Petric (SLO); W 20-19	Ozturk (TUR); W 7-14	2nd place, silver medalist(s)
Stefano Pegoraro	Men's progressive shooting	43	48	91	1 Q	Khiari (TUN); W 47-38	Milicevic (CRO); W 48-41	Chirat (FRA); L 45-46	2nd place, silver medalist(s)
Serena Traversa	Women's progressive shooting	39	37	76	1 Q	Bye	Vojkovic (CRO); L 32-36	Volcina (SLO); W 38-36	3rd place, bronze medalist(s)

Pétanque

Athlete	Event	Preliminary round				Quarterfinals	Semifinals	Final / BM	
Athlete	Event	Round 1	Rank	Round 2	Rank	Opposition Score	Opposition Score	Opposition Score	Rank
Saverio Amormino	Men's precision throw	30	6	41	1 Q	Arslantas (TUR); L 21-34	Did not advance		
Monica Scalise	Women's precision throw	10	6	18	4	Did not advance			

Athlete	Event	Group stage			Quarterfinals	Semifinals	Final / BM	
Athlete	Event	Opposition Score	Opposition Score	Rank	Opposition Score	Opposition Score	Opposition Score	Rank
Saverio Amorimino; Andrea Chiapello	Men's doubles	Spain; L 3-10	Monaco; W 13-12	3 Q	Algeria; W 13-5	France; L 9-13	Spain; W 13-11	3rd place, bronze medalist(s)
Alessia Bottero; Monica Scalise	Women's doubles	Turkey; L 3-10	France; L 3-13	4	Did not advance			

Raffa

Athlete	Event	Preliminary round				Semifinals	Final / BM	
Athlete	Event	Opposition Score	Opposition Score	Opposition Score	Rank	Opposition Score	Opposition Score	Rank
Mattia Visconti	Men's raffa single	Ali (ALG); W 12-6	Rouault (FRA); W 12-6	Rouault (FRA); W 12-8	1 Q	Dall'Olmo (SMR); W 12-8	Emen (TUR); W 12-2	1st place, gold medalist(s)
Flavia Morelli	Women's raffa single	Elbez (LBA); W 12-0	Cil (TUR); W 12-0	Cil (TUR); L 5-12	2 Q	Aissioui (ALG); L 10-11	Paoletti (SMR); W 12-3	3rd place, bronze medalist(s)

Athlete	Event	Group stage					Semifinals	Final / BM	
Athlete	Event	Opposition Score	Opposition Score	Opposition Score	Opposition Score	Rank	Opposition Score	Opposition Score	Rank
Marco Di Nicola; Mattia Visconti	Men's doubles	Morocco; T 0-0	San Marino; L 6-12	San Marino; L 6-12	—N/a	2 Q	Libya; W 12-1	San Marino; W 11-7	1st place, gold medalist(s)
Flavia Morelli; Ilaria Treccani	Women's doubles	France; W 12-7	San Marino; L 7-12	France; W 11-9	San Marino; L 5-12	2 Q	Algeria; W 12-11	San Marino; L 3-12	2nd place, silver medalist(s)

== Boxing ==
Italy competed in boxing.

Men

Athlete	Event	Round of 16	Quarterfinals	Semifinals	Final	
Athlete	Event	Opposition Result	Opposition Result	Opposition Result	Opposition Result	Rank
Federico Emilio Serra	Men's flyweight	Bye	Molina Salvador (ESP); W 2-1	Gümüş (TUR); W 3-0	Mortaji (MAR); W KO	1st place, gold medalist(s)
Francesco Iozia	Men's featherweight	Mordjane (ALG); L 0-3	Did not advance			
Giuseppe Canonico	Men's lightweight	Bye	Ivkovic (BIH); W KO	Hamout (MAR); L 0-3	Did not advance	3rd place, bronze medalist(s)
Gianluigi Malanga	Men's light welterweight	Bye	Christodoulou (CYP); W 3-0	Nadir (MAR); W 3-0	Abdelli (ALG); L 0-3	2nd place, silver medalist(s)
Salvatore Cavallaro	Men's welterweight	Bye	Savkovic (MNE); L 0-3	Did not advance		
Salvatore Cavallaro	Men's middleweight	Knezevic (CRO); W WO	Amroug (MAR); W 2-1	Nemouchi (ALG); L 1-2	Did not advance	3rd place, bronze medalist(s)
Alfred Cromwell Commey	Men's light heavyweight	Jalidov Gafurova (ESP); L 1-2	Did not advance			
Aziz Abbes Mouhiidine	Men's heavyweight	Bye	Reyes Pla (ESP); W 3-0	Nanitzanian (GRE); W 3-0	Hamani (ALG); W 3-0	1st place, gold medalist(s)
Vincenzo Fiaschetti	Men's super heavyweight	—N/a	Hysa (ALB); W 2-1	Aboudou Moindze (FRA); W 3-0	Hafez (EGY); L 1-2	2nd place, silver medalist(s)

Women

Athlete	Event	Round of 16	Quarterfinals	Semifinals	Final	
Athlete	Event	Opposition Result	Opposition Result	Opposition Result	Opposition Result	Rank
Roberta Bonatti	Women's minimumweight	—N/a	Çağırır (TUR); L 1-2	Did not advance		
Giordana Sorrentino	Women's light flyweight	—N/a	Mohamed (EGY); W 3-0	Fuertes (EGY); W 3-0	Moulai (FRA); W 3-0	1st place, gold medalist(s)
Sirine Charaabi	Women's bantamweight	Bye	Akbaş (TUR); L 0-3	Did not advance		
Rebecca Nicoli	Women's lightweight	—N/a	Papadatou (GRE); W 3-0	Rhaddi (MAR); L 1-2	Did not advance	3rd place, bronze medalist(s)
Assunta Canfora	Women's light welterweight	—N/a	Bye	Larché (FRA); W 3-0	Kelif (ALG); L 0-3	2nd place, silver medalist(s)
Melissa Gemini	Women's welterweight	—N/a	Khaled (EGY); W 3-0	Sürmeneli (TUR); L 0-3	Did not advance	3rd place, bronze medalist(s)

== Cycling ==
Italy competed in cycling.

Men

Athlete	Event	Time	Rank
Samuele Zambelli	Road race	3:13:45	11
Matteo Zurlo	Road race	3:15:34	21
Luca Coati	Road race	3:15:35	40
Davide Persico	Road race	3:15:35	41
Carloalberto Giordani	Road race	3:15:41	42
Mattia Pinazzi	Road race	3:15:41	43
Michael Belleri	Road race	DNF	
Luca Coati	Time trial	33:06.50	5

Women

Athlete	Event	Time	Rank
Arianna Fidanza	Road race	1:58:50	27
Giulia Maria Confalonieri	Road race	1:58:36	25
Eleonora Camilla Gasparrini	Road race	1:58:36	24
Vittoria Guazzini	Road race	1:58:29	19
Ilaria Sanguineti	Road race	1:58:24	5
Barbara Guarischi	Road race	1:58:24	1st place, gold medalist(s)
Vittoria Guazzini	Time trial	24:24.40	1st place, gold medalist(s)
Arianna Fidanza	Time trial	26:15.58	6

== Fencing ==
Italy competed in fencing.

Men

Athlete	Event	Play Stage							Round of 32	Round of 16	Quarterfinal	Semifinal	Final / BM	
Athlete	Event	Opposition Score	Opposition Score	Opposition Score	Opposition Score	Opposition Score	Opposition Score	Rank	Opposition Score	Opposition Score	Opposition Score	Opposition Score	Opposition Score	Rank
Riccardo Nuccio	Sabre	Annic (FRA); W 5–2	Yildirim (TUR); W 5–3	Elsissy (EGY); W 5–1	Izem (ALG); W 5–2	Hmissi (TUN); W 5–2	—N/a	1	—N/a	Bye	Amer (EGY); W 15–6	Bravo Aramburu (ESP); W 15-11	Elsissy (EGY); L 9-15	2nd place, silver medalist(s)
Giovanni Repetti	Sabre	Ferjani (TUN); W 1-5	Seitz (FRA); W 5–3	Abdelaziz Saad (ALG); W 5–1	Bravo Aramburu (ESP); L 4-5	Zavirsek Zorz (SLO); W 5-1	Moataz (EGY); W 5–4	2	—N/a	Annic (FRA); W 14-15	Bravo Aramburu (ESP); L 15-3	Did not advance		
Dario Cavaliere	Sabre	Bounabi (ALG); W 5-2	Ferjani (TUN); W 5-4	Kranjnc (SLO); W 5–2	Amer (EGY); W 5-0	Pogu (FRA); W 5-3	—N/a	1	—N/a	Izem (ALG); W 4-15	Ferjani (TUN); W 14-15	Elsissy (EGY); L 9-15	Did not advance	3rd place, bronze medalist(s)
Valerio Cuomo	Épée	Taliotis (CYP); W 5-1	Ekenler (TUR); W 5–0	Allegre (FRA); W 5–3	Fabregat Pujol (ESP); L 2-5	Kraria (ALG); W 5–3	—N/a	1	Bye	Taliotis (CYP); W 15–7	Yasseen (EGY); W 12–8	Tagliariol (ITA); W 15-10	Elsayed (EGY); L 13-15	2nd place, silver medalist(s)
Giacomo Paolini	Épée	Srbinoski (MKD); W 5–0	Frazao (POR); W 5-0	Hoareau-Berkani (ALG); W 5-1	Nahi (MAR); W 5-1	Abujtela (LBA); W 5-2	El-Sayed (EGY); L 4-5	1	Bye	Elkord (MAR); W 8-15	Elsokkary (EGY); W 10-15	Elsayed (EGY); L 15-14	Did not Advance	3rd place, bronze medalist(s)
Matteo Tagliariol	Épée	Jerent (FRA); W 4–3	Elkord (MAR); W 5-4	El Choueiri (LBN); W 5–2	Elsokkary (EGY); W 5-2	Eljibali (LBA); W 3–2	—N/a	1	Bye	El Haouari (MAR); W 15–7	Allegre (FRA); W 15–5	Cuomo (ITA); L 10-15	Did not advance	3rd place, bronze medalist(s)
Edoardo Luperi	Foil	Llavador (ESP); L 3-5	Elice (FRA); W 5-2	Essam (EGY); W 5-2	Files (CRO); W 5-4	Fellah (ALG); W 5-1	—N/a	2	—N/a	Essam (EGY); W 15-8	Hamza (EGY); L 14-15	Did not advance		
Davide Filippi	Foil	Hamza (EGY); W 5-4	Bibard (FRA); W 5-3	Minuto (TUR); W 5-3	Macedo (POR); W 5-3	Madi (ALG); W 5-1	—N/a	1	—N/a	Bye	Bianchi (ITA); W 15-8	Cuk (SRB); L 10-15	Did not advance	3rd place, bronze medalist(s)
Guillaume Bianchi	Foil	Cuk (SRB); L 2-5	Tofalides (CYP); W 5-2	Aboelkasem (EGY); L 3-5	Ediri (FRA); W 5-2	Heroui (ALG); W 5-2	—N/a	2	—N/a	Minuto (TUR); W 15-4	Filippi (ITA); L 8-15	Did not advance		

Women

Athlete	Event	Play Stage							Round of 32	Round of 16	Quarterfinal	Semifinal	Final / BM	
Athlete	Event	Opposition Score	Opposition Score	Opposition Score	Opposition Score	Opposition Score	Opposition Score	Rank	Opposition Score	Opposition Score	Opposition Score	Opposition Score	Opposition Score	Rank
Rebecca Gargano	Sabre	Mormile (ITA); L 3-5	Navarro (ESP); L 3-5	Boudiaf (ALG); L 4-5	Shchukla (TUR); W 5–4	Aime (FRA); W 5-1	—N/a	4	—N/a	Belkbir (ALG); W 15-8	Lembach (FRA); W 15-12	Boudiaf (ALG); L 11-15	Did not advance	3rd place, bronze medalist(s)
Chiara Mormile	Sabre	Gargano (ITA); W 5–3	Shchukla (TUR); W 5–2	Navarro (ESP); W 5-2	Aime (FRA); W 5-3	Boudiaf (ALG); L 2-5	—N/a	2	—N/a	Bye	Martín-Portugués (ESP); W 15-6	Passaro (ITA); W 15-12	Boudiaf (ALG); L 7-15	2nd place, silver medalist(s)
Eloisa Passaro	Sabre	Kehli (ALG); L 3-5	Martín-Portugués (ESP); L 4-5	Lembach (FRA); L 2-5	Vongsavady (FRA); L 4-5	Daghfous (TUN); W 5-4	Belkbir (ALG); W 5-3	5	—N/a	Kehli (ALG); W 15-13	Vongsavady (FRA); W 15-12	Mormile (ITA); L 12-15	Did not advance	3rd place, bronze medalist(s)

== Football ==
Summary

Team	Event	Group stage				Semifinal	Final / BM	
Team	Event	Opposition Score	Opposition Score	Opposition Score	Rank	Opposition Score	Opposition Score	Rank
Italy U18 men's	Men's tournament	Portugal; W 1–0	Greece; W 4–0	Turkey; D 0–0	1 Q	Morocco; W 2–1	France; L 0–1	2nd place, silver medalist(s)

Group play

Pos	Team	Pld	W	D	L	GF	GA	GD	Pts	Qualification
1	Italy	3	2	1	0	5	0	+5	7	Semifinals
2	Turkey	3	1	1	1	2	3	−1	4	Semifinals
3	Portugal	3	1	0	2	2	3	−1	3	
4	Greece	3	1	0	2	3	6	−3	3	

Source: Oran 2022
26 June 2022
20:00

Italy	1–0	Portugal
Raimondo 77'	Report

Ahmed Zabana Stadium, Oran
Referee: Karim Sabry (Morocco)

28 June 2022
17:00

Italy	4–0	Greece
Raimondo 47', 65', 90+1' (pen.); D'Andrea 79' (pen.)	Report

Mers El Hadjadj Stadium, Mers El Hadjadj
Referee: Lotfi Bekouassa (Algeria)

30 June 2022
17:00

Turkey	0–0	Italy
	Report

Mers El Hadjadj Stadium, Mers El Hadjadj
Referee: Amir Loucif (Tunisia)

Semifinal

2 July 2022
20:00

Italy	2–1	Morocco
Raimondo 55', 63'	Report	Khalifi 90+3' (pen.)

Abdelkrim Kerroum Stadium, Sig
Referee: Jérémie Pignard (France)

Gold medal match

4 July 2022
20:45

France	1–0	Italy
Pirringuel 68'	Report

Miloud Hadefi Stadium, Bir El Djir
Attendance: 25,000 (official)
45,000
Referee: Lotfi Bekouassa (Algeria)

== Handball ==
Summary

Team	Event	Group stage					Semifinal	Final / BM / Pl.	
Team	Event	Opposition Score	Opposition Score	Opposition Score	Opposition Score	Rank	Opposition Score	Opposition Score	Rank
Italy men's	Men's tournament	Egypt; L 35–38	Serbia; L 33–34	Tunisia; L 29–34	Slovenia; W 10–0	4	Did not advance	Turkey; W 34–25	7

=== Men's tournament ===
Group play

Pos	Team	Pld	W	D	L	GF	GA	GD	Pts	Qualification
1	Egypt	4	4	0	0	113	89	+24	8	Semifinals
2	Serbia	4	3	0	1	107	97	+10	6	Semifinals
3	Tunisia	4	2	0	2	99	94	+5	4	Fifth place game
4	Italy	4	1	0	3	107	106	+1	2	Seventh place game
5	Slovenia (Note: Slovenia withdrew from the tournament due to several positive COVID-19 cases. The matches were counted as a 10–0 win for the opposing team.)	4	0	0	4	0	40	−40	0	Ninth place game

Source: Oran 2022
Rules for classification: 1) Points; 2) Head-to-head points; 3) Head-to-head goal difference; 4) Head-to-head goals scored; 5) Goal difference; 6) Goals scored; 7) Draw.
Notes:

27 June 2022; 16:00	Egypt	38–35	Italy	24 February Indoor Hall, Arzew; Referees: Ilievski, Ilievski (MKD)
27 June 2022; 16:00	Kaddah 9	(20–14)	Parisini 8	24 February Indoor Hall, Arzew; Referees: Ilievski, Ilievski (MKD)
27 June 2022; 16:00	3× (suspension)	Report	1× (suspension)	24 February Indoor Hall, Arzew; Referees: Ilievski, Ilievski (MKD)

30 June 2022; 14:00	Italy	33–34	Serbia	24 February Indoor Hall, Arzew; Referees: Ghoul, Chergui (ALG)
30 June 2022; 14:00	Arcieri 7	(16–15)	Milić 8	24 February Indoor Hall, Arzew; Referees: Ghoul, Chergui (ALG)
30 June 2022; 14:00	1× (suspension)	Report	2× (yellow card) 6× (suspension) 1× (red card)	24 February Indoor Hall, Arzew; Referees: Ghoul, Chergui (ALG)

1 July 2022; 12:00	Tunisia	34–29	Italy	24 February Indoor Hall, Arzew; Referees: Ilievski, Ilievski (MKD)
1 July 2022; 12:00	Bhar, Boughanmi 8	(18–15)	Prantner 7	24 February Indoor Hall, Arzew; Referees: Ilievski, Ilievski (MKD)
1 July 2022; 12:00	1× (yellow card) 2× (suspension)	Report	1× (yellow card) 5× (suspension)	24 February Indoor Hall, Arzew; Referees: Ilievski, Ilievski (MKD)

Cancelled	Italy	10–0	Slovenia	24 February Indoor Hall, Arzew

Seventh place game

4 July 2022; 12:30	Italy	34–25	Turkey	24 February Indoor Hall, Arzew; Referees: Jakovljević, Sando Kovačević (SRB)
4 July 2022; 12:30	Mengon, Moretti 6	(22–11)	İlanç 8	24 February Indoor Hall, Arzew; Referees: Jakovljević, Sando Kovačević (SRB)
4 July 2022; 12:30		Report	1× (yellow card) 5× (suspension)	24 February Indoor Hall, Arzew; Referees: Jakovljević, Sando Kovačević (SRB)

== Judo ==
Italy competed in judo.

== Karate ==
Italy competed in karate.

== Sailing ==
Italy competed in sailing.

== Shooting ==
Italy competed in shooting.

== Swimming ==
Italy competed in swimming.

Men

Athlete	Event	Heat		Final	
Athlete	Event	Time	Rank	Time	Rank
Gianluca Andolfi	50 m butterfly	24.26	11	did not advance	
Alessandro Bori	50 m freestyle	22.63	6 Q	22.50	6
Alessandro Bori	100 m freestyle	49.45	3 Q	49.12	3rd place, bronze medalist(s)
Luca Bruno	200 m butterfly	2:00.92	7 Q	2:00.63	7
Fabio Dalu	1500 m freestyle	15:35.90	8 Q	15:28.41	6
Luca De Tullio	400 m freestyle	3:53.75	4 Q	3:50.11	3rd place, bronze medalist(s)
Luca De Tullio	1500 m freestyle	15:29.61	4 Q	15:16.31	4
Claudio Faraci	200 m butterfly	1:58.49	1 Q	1:57.09	1st place, gold medalist(s)
Nicolò Franceschi	50 m freestyle	22.69	9	did not advance	
Alessandro Fusco	100 m breaststroke	1:02.44	8 Q	1:02.26	8
Alessandro Fusco	200 m breaststroke	2:16.22	6 Q	2:15.38	6
Pier Andrea Matteazzi	200 m individual medley	2:02.80	6 Q	2:00.24	3rd place, bronze medalist(s)
Pier Andrea Matteazzi	400 m individual medley	4:23.56	3 Q	4:13.83	1st place, gold medalist(s)
Filippo Megli	100 m freestyle	49.18	2 Q	49.00	1st place, gold medalist(s)
Filippo Megli	200 m freestyle	1:48.08	1 Q	1:47.33	1st place, gold medalist(s)
Lorenzo Mora	50 m backstroke	25.54	6 Q	25.17	3rd place, bronze medalist(s)
Lorenzo Mora	100 m backstroke	55.09	4 Q	54.50	2nd place, silver medalist(s)
Lorenzo Mora	200 m backstroke	2:00.66	=3 Q	1:57.62	1st place, gold medalist(s)
Alessandro Pinzuti	50 m breaststroke	27.82	6 Q	27.55	4
Alessandro Pinzuti	100 m breaststroke	1:01.50	2 Q	1:00.31	3rd place, bronze medalist(s)
Alessio Proietti Colonna	200 m freestyle	1:49.94	4 Q	1:48.61	4
Alessio Proietti Colonna	400 m freestyle	3:56.83	7 Q	3:56.12	8
Matteo Restivo	100 m backstroke	55.88	10	did not advance	
Matteo Restivo	200 m backstroke	2:00.66	=3 Q	1:57.77	2nd place, silver medalist(s)
Matteo Rivolta	50 m butterfly	23.89	3 Q	23.59	2nd place, silver medalist(s)
Matteo Rivolta	100 m butterfly	52.97	3 Q	51.66 GR	1st place, gold medalist(s)
Pietro Paolo Sarpe	400 m individual medley	4:23.36	2 Q	4:20.41	3rd place, bronze medalist(s)
Fabio Scozzoli	50 m breaststroke	27.17	1 Q	26.97 GR	1st place, gold medalist(s)
Simone Stefanì	50 m backstroke	25.17	1 Q	25.00	1st place, gold medalist(s)
Giovanni Sorriso	200 m breaststroke	2:16.58	8 Q	2:15.90	8
Giovanni Sorriso	200 m individual medley	2:03.46	7 Q	2:03.33	7
Edoardo Valsecchi	100 m butterfly	52.63	2 Q	52.53	3rd place, bronze medalist(s)
Luca Serio; Alessandro Bori; Giovanni Carraro; Filippo Megli	4 × 100 m freestyle relay	—N/a		3:15.77	1st place, gold medalist(s)
Mattia Zuin; Luca De Tullio; Filippo Megli; Alessio Proietti Colonna	4 × 200 m freestyle relay	—N/a		DSQ	
Lorenzo Mora; Alessandro Pinzuti; Matteo Rivolta; Alessandro Bori; Matteo Restivo (heat); Alessandro Fusco (heat); Simone Stefanì (heat); Filippo Megli (heat)	4 × 100 m medley relay	3:43.34	4 Q	3:35.77	1st place, gold medalist(s)

Women

Athlete	Event	Heat		Final	
Athlete	Event	Time	Rank	Time	Rank
Lisa Angiolini	50 m breaststroke	31.22	1 Q	30.87 GR	1st place, gold medalist(s)
Lisa Angiolini	100 m breaststroke	1:07.77	1 Q	1:07.59	1st place, gold medalist(s)
Lisa Angiolini	200 m breaststroke	2:32.97	5 Q	2:30.26	5
Ilaria Bianchi	100 m butterfly	59.55	1 Q	59.06	3rd place, bronze medalist(s)
Anita Bottazzo	50 m breaststroke	31.66	5 Q	31.41	3rd place, bronze medalist(s)
Anita Bottazzo	100 m breaststroke	1:08.84	2 Q	1:08.14	2nd place, silver medalist(s)
Martina Caramignoli	400 m freestyle	4:14.50	2 Q	4:12.08	4
Martina Caramignoli	800 m freestyle	—N/a		8:31.75	3rd place, bronze medalist(s)
Vanessa Cavagnoli	200 m breaststroke	2:36.23	7 Q	2:37.82	8
Martina Cenci	200 m backstroke	2:14.56	4 Q	2:13.82	5
Antonietta Cesarano	400 m freestyle	4:14.82	3 Q	4:10.13	3rd place, bronze medalist(s)
Noemi Cesarano	200 m freestyle	2:01.54	6 Q	2:01.21	6
Ilaria Cusinato	200 m butterfly	DNS		did not advance	
Ilaria Cusinato	200 m individual medley	DNS		did not advance	
Sara Franceschi	200 m individual medley	2:17.41	2 Q	2:12.19	1st place, gold medalist(s)
Sara Franceschi	400 m individual medley	4:46.75	2 Q	4:40.86	1st place, gold medalist(s)
Francesca Furfaro	200 m backstroke	2:15.62	7 Q	2:17.15	8
Anita Gastaldi	50 m backstroke	29.00	3 Q	29.17	6
Anita Gastaldi	100 m backstroke	1:03.10	6 Q	1:02.31	6
Sonia Laquintana	50 m butterfly	26.77	4 Q	26.38	3rd place, bronze medalist(s)
Claudia Lutecka	50 m freestyle	26.05	12	did not advance	
Alice Mizzau	100 m freestyle	56.30	9	did not advance	
Alice Mizzau	200 m freestyle	2:01.04	4 Q	1:59.95	3rd place, bronze medalist(s)
Sofia Morini	100 m freestyle	55.90	6 Q	55.56	6
Alessia Polieri	200 m butterfly	2:14.53	9	did not advance	
Viola Scotto di Carlo	50 m freestyle	25.32	4 Q	25.48	5
Viola Scotto di Carlo	50 m butterfly	26.48	1 Q	26.25	2nd place, silver medalist(s)
Claudia Tarzia	100 m butterfly	1:00.05	3 Q	59.41	6
Alisia Tettamanzi	800 m freestyle	—N/a		8:37.75	4
Carlotta Toni	400 m individual medley	4:51.99	7 Q	4:54.80	8
Carlotta Zofkova	50 m backstroke	29.18	6 Q	29.06	5
Carlotta Zofkova	100 m backstroke	1:02.19	3 Q	1:01.61	2nd place, silver medalist(s)
Sonia Laquintana; Alice Mizzau; Viola Scotto di Carlo; Sofia Morini	4 × 100 m freestyle relay	—N/a		3:42.86	3rd place, bronze medalist(s)
Linda Caponi; Antonietta Cesarano; Noemi Cesarano; Alice Mizzau	4 × 200 m freestyle relay	—N/a		7:59.63	2nd place, silver medalist(s)
Carlotta Zofkova; Lisa Angiolini; Ilaria Bianchi; Sofia Morini	4 × 100 m medley relay	—N/a		4:04.65	1st place, gold medalist(s)

== Table Tennis ==
Men

Athlete	Event	First Phase				Second Phase				Quarterfinal	Semifinal	Final / BM	
Athlete	Event	Opposition Score	Opposition Score	Opposition Score	Rank	Opposition Score	Opposition Score	Opposition Score	Rank	Opposition Score	Opposition Score	Opposition Score	Rank
Niagol Ivanov Stoyanov	Singles	Giardi (SMR); W 4-1	Rembert (FRA); L 1-4	Kharabaxhag (KOS); W 4-0	2	Saleh (EGY); W 4-3	Caballero Cuellar (ESP); W 4-1	Sgouropoulos (GRE); L 3-4	2	Bouloussa (ALG); W 4-2	Assar (EGY); L 4-3	Ferreiro Geraldo (POR); L 4-0	4
Mihai Bobocica	Singles	Kostantinopoulos (GRE); W 1-0	Kozul (SLO); L 3-4	Yiangou (CYP); W 4-1	1	Andrae Selgas (POR); W 4-2	Yingenler (TUR); W 2-0	Assar (EGY); W 4-1	1	Robles Martinez (ESP); L 3-4	did not advance		5
Bobocica; Stoyanov; Piccolin	Team	Portugal (POR); W 3-1	Turkey (TUR); W 3-2	—N/a	1	—N/a	—N/a	—N/a		Spain (ESP); L 3-2	did not advance		5

Women

Athlete	Event	First Phase			Second Phase				Quarterfinal	Semifinal	Final / BM	
Athlete	Event	Opposition Score	Opposition Score	Rank	Opposition Score	Opposition Score	Opposition Score	Rank	Opposition Score	Opposition Score	Opposition Score	Rank
Nicole Arlia	Singles	Shao (POR); L 0-4	Zhang Xu (ESP); L 0-4	3	did not advance				Zoghlami (TUN); W 1-3	Loghraibi (ALG); W 0-3	Strazar (SLO); W 0-3	17
Giorgia Piccolin	Singles	Strazar (SLO); W 4-2	Lutz (FRA); W 4-1	1	Zhang Xu (ESP); L 4-0	Altinkaya (TUR); L 0-0	Assar (SRB); L 0-0	4	did not advance			13
Nicole Arlia; Giorgia Piccolin; Nikoleta Stefanova	Team	Turkey (TUR); W 3-1	Serbia (SRB); W 3-1	1	—N/a	—N/a	—N/a		Tunisia (TUN); W 3-0	Portugal (POR); W 3-2	Egypt (EGY); L 3-2	2nd place, silver medalist(s)

== Taekwondo ==
Men

Athlete	Event	Round of 16	Quarterfinals	Semifinals	Final / BM	
Athlete	Event	Opposition Result	Opposition Result	Opposition Result	Opposition Result	Rank
Giuseppe Foti	Men's −58 kg	Onanga (FRA); L 19–17	did not advance			
Dennis Baretta	Men's −68 kg	Barakat (EGY); W 10–8	Pérez Polo (ESP); L 25–4	did not advance		
Samuele Baliva	Men's -80 kg	Takov (SRB); L 4-20	did not advance			
Roberto Botta	Men's +80 kg	Bye	Divkovic (SLO); W 2-10	Sapina (CRO); L 18-15	Did not advance	3rd place, bronze medalist(s)

Women

Athlete	Event	Round of 16	Quarterfinals	Semifinals	Final / BM	
Athlete	Event	Opposition Result	Opposition Result	Opposition Result	Opposition Result	Rank
Giada Al Halwani	Women's −57 kg	Bye	Radmilovic (SRB); W 28-8	Ilgun (TUR); L 12-3	Did not advance	3rd place, bronze medalist(s)
Cristina Gaspa	Women's −67 kg	Salih (MAR); L 3-4	did not advance			
Maristella Smiraglia	Women's +67 kg	Aboufaras (MAR); L 23-13	did not advance			

== Tennis ==
Italy competed in tennis.

Men

Athlete	Event	Third round	Quarterfinals	Semifinals	Final / BM	
Athlete	Event	Opposition Result	Opposition Result	Opposition Result	Opposition Result	Rank
Matteo Arnaldi	Singles	Moundir (MAR); L 5–7, 7–6, 3–6	did not advance			
Francesco Passaro	Singles	Elsayed (EGY); W 6–7, 2–6	Chrysochos (CYP); W 1–6, 6–1, 1–6	Benchetrit (MAR); W 4–6, 2–6	Lopez Montagud (ESP); W 7–6, 4–6, 3-6	1st place, gold medalist(s)
Matteo Arnaldi; Francesco Passaro	Doubles	—N/a	Chrysochos / Neos (CYP); W 6–3, 6–2	Ağabigün / Ilkel (TUR); W 6–2, 6–1	Lopez Montagud / López San Martín (ESP); W 6–2, 6–3	1st place, gold medalist(s)

Women

Athlete	Event	Third round	Quarterfinals	Semifinals	Final / BM	
Athlete	Event	Opposition Result	Opposition Result	Opposition Result	Opposition Result	Rank
Aurora Zandeschi	Singles	El Aouni (MAR); W 6–4, 7–5	Maristany (ESP); L 0–6, 1–6	—N/a	Kabbaj (MAR); W ret.	5
Nuria Brancaccio	Singles	Pellicano (MLT); W ret.	Sonmez (TUR); W 6–1, 6–4	Bouzas Maneiro (ESP); W 7–5, 4–6, 3–6	Maristany (ESP); L 2–6, 7–5, 2-6	2nd place, silver medalist(s)
Aurora Zandeschi; Nuria Brancaccio	Doubles	—N/a	Abdelsalam / El Sayed (EGY); W 6–4, 6–2	Curmi / Genovese (MLT); L 6–3, 6–7, 0–0	Did not advance	3rd place, bronze medalist(s)

== Volleyball ==
Italy competed in volleyball.

Team	Event	Group stage				Quarter-final	Semifinal	Final / BM / Pl.	
Team	Event	Opposition Score	Opposition Score	Opposition Score	Rank	Opposition Score	Opposition Score	Opposition Score	Rank
Italy men's	Men's tournament	Egypt; W 3-0	North Macedonia; L 3-0	—N/a	1 Q	Turkey; W 3-0	Croatia; L 1-3	France; W 3-1	3rd place, bronze medalist(s)
Italy women's	Women's tournament	Spain; W 3-0	Turkey; L 1-3	Algeria; W 3-0	2 Q	Croatia; W 3-0	Spain; W 3-0	Turkey; W 3-1	1st place, gold medalist(s)

== Water polo ==
Summary

Team	Event	Group stage				Semifinal	Final / BM / Pl.	
Team	Event	Opposition Score	Opposition Score	Opposition Score	Rank	Opposition Score	Opposition Score	Rank
Italy men's	Men's tournament	Turkey; W 13–2	Spain; L 8–14	Greece; W 10–6	2 Q	Serbia; L 7–8	Spain; L 8–16	4

Group play

Pos	Team	Pld	W	D	L	GF	GA	GD	Pts	Qualification
1	Spain	3	3	0	0	41	27	+14	6	Semifinals
2	Italy	3	2	0	1	31	22	+9	4	Semifinals
3	Greece	3	1	0	2	38	29	+9	2	Fifth place game
4	Turkey	3	0	0	3	17	49	−32	0	Seventh place game

Source: Oran 2022

24 June 2022; 18:00	Report	Turkey	2–13	Italy	Oran; Referees: Matevž Homovec (SLO), Eurico da Silva (POR)
24 June 2022; 18:00	Report	Score by quarters: 1–2, 1–4, 0–2, 0–5			Oran; Referees: Matevž Homovec (SLO), Eurico da Silva (POR)
24 June 2022; 18:00	Report	Caner, Kuloğlu 1	Goals	Cora, Taramasco 4	Oran; Referees: Matevž Homovec (SLO), Eurico da Silva (POR)

26 June 2022; 16:00	Report	Spain	14–8	Italy	Oran; Referees: Igor Virijević (SRB), Andrija Đurašković (MNE)
26 June 2022; 16:00	Report	Score by quarters: 2–1, 3–3, 5–2, 4–2			Oran; Referees: Igor Virijević (SRB), Andrija Đurašković (MNE)
26 June 2022; 16:00	Report	Castro 4	Goals	Nenni 3	Oran; Referees: Igor Virijević (SRB), Andrija Đurašković (MNE)

28 June 2022; 18:00	Report	Italy	10–6	Greece	Oran; Referees: Eurico da Silva (POR), Igor Virijević (SRB)
28 June 2022; 18:00	Report	Score by quarters: 1–1, 4–2, 3–2, 2–1			Oran; Referees: Eurico da Silva (POR), Igor Virijević (SRB)
28 June 2022; 18:00	Report	Bragantini, Nenni 3	Goals	Almyras, Kandanoleon 2	Oran; Referees: Eurico da Silva (POR), Igor Virijević (SRB)

Semifinal

29 June 2022; 17:00	Report	Serbia	8–7	Italy	Oran; Referees: Grigorios Spanoudis (GRE), Emanuel Manol Taylan (TUR)
29 June 2022; 17:00	Report	Score by quarters: 3–1, 2–0, 1–4, 2–2			Oran; Referees: Grigorios Spanoudis (GRE), Emanuel Manol Taylan (TUR)
29 June 2022; 17:00	Report	Dimitrijević, Gavrilović 2	Goals	Taramasco 3	Oran; Referees: Grigorios Spanoudis (GRE), Emanuel Manol Taylan (TUR)

Third place game

30 June 2022; 10:00	Report	Spain	16–8	Italy	Oran; Referees: Andrija Đurašković (MNE), Eurico da Silva (POR)
30 June 2022; 10:00	Report	Score by quarters: 2–4, 4–1, 5–2, 5–1			Oran; Referees: Andrija Đurašković (MNE), Eurico da Silva (POR)
30 June 2022; 10:00	Report	Castro 4	Goals	three players 2	Oran; Referees: Andrija Đurašković (MNE), Eurico da Silva (POR)

== Weightlifting ==
Italy competed in weightlifting.

Men

Athlete	Event	Snatch		Clean & Jerk	
Athlete	Event	Result	Rank	Result	Rank
Mirko Zanni	−73 kg	150	1st place, gold medalist(s)	177	3rd place, bronze medalist(s)
Antonino Pizzolato	−89 kg	172	1st place, gold medalist(s)	213	1st place, gold medalist(s)
Cristiano Giuseppe Ficco	−102 kg	164	3rd place, bronze medalist(s)	207	4

Women

Athlete	Event	Snatch		Clean & Jerk	
Athlete	Event	Result	Rank	Result	Rank
Giulia Imperio	−49 kg	83	1st place, gold medalist(s)	97	1st place, gold medalist(s)
Lucrezia Magistris	−59 kg	95	1st place, gold medalist(s)	114	2nd place, silver medalist(s)
Carlotta Brunelli	−71 kg	93	5	105	11

== Wrestling ==
Italy competed in wrestling. Key:

- WO – walkover
- VFA (ranking points: 5–0 or 0–5) – Victory by fall.
- VIN (ranking points: 5–0 or 0–5) – Victory by injury
- VDQB (ranking point: 5-0 or 0-5) - Victory for withdrawal or disqualification
- VPO1 (ranking points: 3–1 or 1–3) – Decision by points – the loser with technical points.
- VPO (ranking points: 3–0 or 0–3) – Decision by points – the loser without technical points.
- VSU (ranking points: 4–0 or 0–4) – Great superiority – the loser without technical points and a margin of victory of at least 8 (Greco-Roman) or 10 (freestyle) points.
- VSU1 (ranking points: 4–1 or 1–4) – Technical superiority – the loser with technical points and a margin of victory of at least 8 (Greco-Roman) or 10 (freestyle) points.

Greco-Roman

Athlete	Event	Group Stage			Round of 16	Quarterfinal	Semifinal	Repechage	Final / BM	
Athlete	Event	Opposition Result	Opposition Result	Rank	Opposition Result	Opposition Result	Opposition Result	Opposition Result	Opposition Result	Rank
Ruben Marvice	Men's 60 kg	—N/a			Bobillo Virgil (ESP); W VPO1 (6-2)	Tudezca (FRA); L VPO1 (3-5)	Did not advance	Fajari (MAR); W VSU1 (9-1)	Alnakdali (SYR); W VDQB (10-8)	3rd place, bronze medalist(s)
Ignazio Sanfilippo	Men's 67 kg	—N/a				Fawaz (SYR); W VSU (8-0)	Firat (TUR); L VPO1 (1-6)	—N/a	Snjoyan (FRA); L VPO1 (1-4)	5
Ciro Russo	Men's 77 kg	—N/a			Bye	Ouakali (ALG); L VFA (0-8)	Did not advance	Mejias (ESP); W VPO1 (6-0)	Kamenjasevic (CRO); L VPO1 (1-3)	5
Mirco Minguzzi	Men's 87 kg	—N/a				Dickov (SRB); W VPO1 (6-3)	Hassan (EGY); W VPO1 (7-3)	Did not advance	Sid Azara (ALG); L VPO (0-5)	2nd place, silver medalist(s)
Samuele Varicelli	Men's 130 kg	Guennichi (TUN); L VSU (0-9)	Kouchit (ALG); L VSU (0-9)	3	Did not advance					
