= Swimming at the 2022 Mediterranean Games – Women's 100 metre breaststroke =

Women's 100 metre breaststroke at the 2022 Mediterranean Games
- Location: Bir El Djir, Algeria
- Dates: 2 July
- Competitors: 13 from 10 nations
- Winning time: 1:07.59

Medalists
gold medal	Lisa Angiolini	Italy
silver medal	Anita Bottazzo	Italy
bronze medal	Viktoriya Zeynep Güneş	Turkey

The women's 100 metre breaststroke competition at the 2022 Mediterranean Games was held on 2 July 2022 at the Aquatic Center of the Olympic Complex in Bir El Djir.

== Records ==
Prior to this competition, the existing world and Mediterranean Games records were as follows:

World record	Lilly King (USA)	1:04.13	Budapest, Hungary	25 July 2017
Mediterranean Games record	Jessica Vall (ESP)	1:07.19	Tarragona, Spain	24 June 2018

== Results ==
=== Heats ===
The heats were started at 10:50.

Rank	Heat	Lane	Name	Nationality	Time	Notes
1	2	4	Lisa Angiolini	Italy	1:07.77	Q
2	1	4	Anita Bottazzo	Italy	1:08.84	Q
3	2	5	Viktoriya Zeynep Güneş	Turkey	1:08.85	Q
4	1	5	Marina García	Spain	1:09.21	Q
5	2	6	Ana Blažević	Croatia	1:09.79	Q
6	1	3	Tara Vovk	Slovenia	1:09.97	Q
7	1	6	Chara Angelaki	Greece	1:10.04	Q
8	2	3	Ana Rodrigues	Portugal	1:10.56	Q
9	1	2	Tjaša Pintar	Slovenia	1:10.98	
10	2	2	Maria Drasidou	Greece	1:11.29	
11	2	1	Nàdia Tudó	Andorra	1:13.25	
12	2	7	Claudia Verdino	Monaco	1:17.41	
13	1	7	Vanesa Beka	Kosovo	1:20.87	

=== Final ===
The final was held at 18:45.

Rank	Lane	Name	Nationality	Time	Notes
1st place, gold medalist(s)	4	Lisa Angiolini	Italy	1:07.59	
2nd place, silver medalist(s)	5	Anita Bottazzo	Italy	1:08.14	
3rd place, bronze medalist(s)	3	Viktoriya Zeynep Güneş	Turkey	1:08.44	
4	6	Marina García	Spain	1:08.91	
5	7	Tara Vovk	Slovenia	1:09.16	
6	8	Ana Rodrigues	Portugal	1:09.42	
7	2	Ana Blažević	Croatia	1:09.60	
8	1	Chara Angelaki	Greece	1:09.88	
