= Swimming at the 2022 Mediterranean Games – Women's 50 metre breaststroke =

Women's 50 metre breaststroke at the 2022 Mediterranean Games
- Location: Bir El Djir, Algeria
- Dates: 4 July
- Competitors: 11 from 8 nations
- Winning time: 30.87

Medalists
gold medal	Lisa Angiolini	Italy
silver medal	Ana Rodrigues	Portugal
bronze medal	Anita Bottazzo	Italy

The women's 50 metre breaststroke competition at the 2022 Mediterranean Games was held on 4 July 2022 at the Aquatic Center of the Olympic Complex in Bir El Djir.

== Records ==
Prior to this competition, the existing world and Mediterranean Games records were as follows:

World record	Benedetta Pilato (ITA)	29.30	Budapest, Hungary	22 May 2021
Mediterranean Games record	Arianna Castiglioni (ITA)	31.07	Tarragona, Spain	25 June 2018

The following records were established during the competition:

Date	Event	Name	Nationality	Time	Record
4 July	Final	Lisa Angiolini	Italy	30.87	GR

== Results ==
=== Heats ===
The heats were started at 10:00.

Rank	Heat	Lane	Name	Nationality	Time	Notes
1	1	4	Lisa Angiolini	Italy	31.22	Q
2	2	3	Ana Rodrigues	Portugal	31.36	Q
3	1	5	Tara Vovk	Slovenia	31.39	Q
4	2	4	Maria Drasidou	Greece	31.51	Q
5	2	5	Anita Bottazzo	Italy	31.66	Q
6	1	6	Marina García	Spain	31.90	Q
7	2	6	Chara Angelaki	Greece	31.96	Q
8	1	3	Viktoriya Zeynep Güneş	Turkey	32.19	Q, WD
9	2	2	Tjaša Pintar	Slovenia	32.25	Q
10	2	7	Claudia Verdino	Monaco	34.33	
11	1	2	Vanesa Beka	Kosovo	37.14	

=== Final ===
The final was held at 18:00.

Rank	Lane	Name	Nationality	Time	Notes
1st place, gold medalist(s)	4	Lisa Angiolini	Italy	30.87	GR
2nd place, silver medalist(s)	5	Ana Rodrigues	Portugal	31.31	
3rd place, bronze medalist(s)	2	Anita Bottazzo	Italy	31.41	
4	6	Maria Drasidou	Greece	31.64	
5	3	Tara Vovk	Slovenia	31.75	
6	7	Marina García	Spain	32.02	
7	8	Tjaša Pintar	Slovenia	32.11	
8	1	Chara Angelaki	Greece	32.24	
