= Swimming at the 2022 Mediterranean Games – Women's 200 metre breaststroke =

Women's 200 metre breaststroke at the 2022 Mediterranean Games
- Location: Bir El Djir, Algeria
- Dates: 5 July
- Competitors: 10 from 8 nations
- Winning time: 2:26.48

Medalists
gold medal	Viktoriya Zeynep Güneş	Turkey
silver medal	Marina García	Spain
bronze medal	Raquel Pereira	Portugal

The women's 200 metre breaststroke competition at the 2022 Mediterranean Games was held on 5 July 2022 at the Aquatic Center of the Olympic Complex in Bir El Djir.

== Records ==
Prior to this competition, the existing world and Mediterranean Games records were as follows:

World record	Tatjana Schoenmaker (RSA)	2:18.95	Tokyo, Japan	30 July 2021
Mediterranean Games record	Jessica Vall (ESP)	2:25.22	Tarragona, Spain	23 June 2018

== Results ==
=== Heats ===
The heats were started at 11:01.

Rank	Heat	Lane	Name	Nationality	Time	Notes
1	2	4	Marina García	Spain	2:29.43	Q
2	2	3	Ana Blažević	Croatia	2:30.79	Q
3	2	5	Viktoriya Zeynep Güneş	Turkey	2:31.53	Q
4	1	5	Raquel Pereira	Portugal	2:32.79	Q
5	1	4	Lisa Angiolini	Italy	2:32.97	Q
6	2	2	Alba Vázquez	Spain	2:34.47	Q
7	1	3	Vanessa Cavagnoli	Italy	2:36.23	Q
8	2	6	Chara Angelaki	Greece	2:36.79	Q
9	1	2	Nàdia Tudó	Andorra	2:37.60	
10	1	6	Hamida Rania Nefsi	Algeria	2:39.52	

=== Final ===
The final was held at 18:35.

Rank	Lane	Name	Nationality	Time	Notes
1st place, gold medalist(s)	3	Viktoriya Zeynep Güneş	Turkey	2:26.48	
2nd place, silver medalist(s)	4	Marina García	Spain	2:27.32	
3rd place, bronze medalist(s)	6	Raquel Pereira	Portugal	2:28.35	
4	5	Ana Blažević	Croatia	2:30.15	
5	2	Lisa Angiolini	Italy	2:30.26	
6	7	Alba Vázquez	Spain	2:31.28	
7	8	Chara Angelaki	Greece	2:33.33	
8	1	Vanessa Cavagnoli	Italy	2:37.82	
