= Swimming at the 2022 Mediterranean Games – Men's 100 metre freestyle =

Men's 100 metre freestyle at the 2022 Mediterranean Games
- Location: Bir El Djir, Algeria
- Dates: 2 July
- Competitors: 21 from 13 nations
- Winning time: 49.00

Medalists
gold medal	Filippo Megli	Italy
silver medal	Diogo Ribeiro	Portugal
bronze medal	Alessandro Bori	Italy

The men's 100 metre freestyle competition at the 2022 Mediterranean Games was held on 2 July 2022 at the Aquatic Center of the Olympic Complex in Bir El Djir.

== Records ==
Prior to this competition, the existing world and Mediterranean Games records were as follows:

World record	César Cielo (BRA)	46.91	Rome, Italy	30 July 2009
Mediterranean Games record	Alain Bernard (FRA)	47.83	Pescara, Italy	29 June 2009

== Results ==
=== Heats ===
The heats were started at 10:30.

Rank	Heat	Lane	Name	Nationality	Time	Notes
1	1	6	Charles Rihoux	France	48.58	Q
2	2	4	Filippo Megli	Italy	49.18	Q
3	2	5	Alessandro Bori	Italy	49.45	Q
4	1	5	Andreas Vazaios	Greece	49.62	Q
5	3	4	Diogo Ribeiro	Portugal	49.66	Q
6	1	4	Uroš Nikolić	Serbia	49.78	Q
7	2	3	Luis Domínguez	Spain	49.81	Q
8	2	2	Mario Šurković	Croatia	49.82	Q
9	3	6	Mario Mollà	Spain	50.06	
10	3	5	Miguel Nascimento	Portugal	50.10	
11	2	6	Stergios Bilas	Greece	50.23	
12	3	3	Nikola Aćin	Serbia	50.30	
13	1	3	Julien Berol	France	50.56	
14	3	2	Emre Sakçı	Turkey	50.97	
15	3	7	Doğa Çelik	Turkey	51.20	
16	3	1	Tomàs Lomero	Andorra	51.86	NR
17	1	7	Fares Benzidoun	Algeria	52.48	
18	2	7	Mehdi Nazim Benbara	Algeria	52.78	
19	2	1	Andreas Pantziaros	Cyprus	55.07	
20	1	1	Siraj Al-Sharif	Libya	56.89	
21	1	2	Drini Ujkashej	Albania	59.37	

=== Final ===
The final was held at 18:32.

Rank	Lane	Name	Nationality	Time	Notes
1st place, gold medalist(s)	5	Filippo Megli	Italy	49.00	
2nd place, silver medalist(s)	2	Diogo Ribeiro	Portugal	49.02	
3rd place, bronze medalist(s)	3	Alessandro Bori	Italy	49.12	
4	4	Charles Rihoux	France	49.15	
5	6	Andreas Vazaios	Greece	49.50	
6	1	Luis Domínguez	Spain	49.82	
7	7	Uroš Nikolić	Serbia	49.85	
8	8	Mario Šurković	Croatia	50.61	
