= Wrestling at the 2022 Mediterranean Games – Men's freestyle 74 kg =

Wrestling competitions

Men's Freestyle 74 kg at the 2022 Mediterranean Games
- Venue: EMEC Hall
- Date: 27–28 June
- Competitors: 8 from 8 nations

Medalists
gold medal	Amr Reda Hussen	Egypt
silver medal	Samet Ak	Turkey
bronze medal	Malik Amine	San Marino
bronze medal	Islam Dudaev	Albania

The men's freestyle 74 kg competition of the wrestling events at the 2022 Mediterranean Games in Oran, Algeria, was held from 27 June to 28 June at the EMEC Hall.

== Results ==
Legend

- F — Won by fall

Quarterfinals		Semifinals		Final
Amr Reda Hussen (EGY)	10
Malik Amine (SMR)	0	Amr Reda Hussen (EGY)	4^{F}
Jacopo Masotti (ITA)	4	Jacopo Masotti (ITA)	0
Alban Sopa (KOS)	0			Amr Reda Hussen (EGY)	11
Abdelkader Ikkal (ALG)	3			Samet Ak (TUR)	1
Fati Vejseli (MKD)	2	Abdelkader Ikkal (ALG)	2
Islam Dudaev (ALB)	3	Samet Ak (TUR)	7
Samet Ak (TUR)	6

Bronze medals
Malik Amine (SMR)	6
Jacopo Masotti (ITA)	4
Islam Dudaev (ALB)	8
Abdelkader Ikkal (ALG)	0
