= Boxing at the 2022 Mediterranean Games – Men's welterweight =

Boxing competitions

Men's welterweight boxing at the 2022 Mediterranean Games
- Venue: EMEC Hall
- Date: 26 June – 1 July
- Competitors: 14 from 14 nations

Medalists
gold medal	Jugurtha Ait-Bekka	Algeria
silver medal	Stefan Savković	Montenegro
bronze medal	Omar Elsayed	Egypt
bronze medal	Hamza El Barbari	Morocco

The men's welterweight (69 kg) competition of the boxing events at the 2022 Mediterranean Games in Oran, Algeria, was held from 26 June to 1 July at the EMEC Hall.

Like all Mediterranean Games boxing events, the competition was a straight single-elimination tournament. Both semifinal losers were awarded bronze medals, so no boxers competed again after their first loss.

== Results ==
Round of 16
Hamza El Barbari (MAR)	ABD
Patriot Behrami (KOS)
Jugurtha Ait-Bekka (ALG)	3
Noa Ježek (CRO)	0
Necat Ekinci (TUR)	1
Alban Beqiri (ALB)	2
Hugo Grau (FRA)	0
Omar Elsayed (EGY)	2
Abdulhadi Nakkash (SYR)
Ibrahim Ali (LBA)	RSC
Stefan Savković (MNE)	3
Rafail Pafios (CYP)	0

Quarterfinals
Gianni Dedić (BIH)	0
Hamza El Barbari (MAR)	3
Jugurtha Ait-Bekka (ALG)	ABD
Alban Beqiri (ALB)
Omar Elsayed (EGY)	3
Ibrahim Ali (LBA)	0
Stefan Savković (MNE)	3
Salvatore Cavallaro (ITA)	0

Semifinals
Hamza El Barbari (MAR)	1
Jugurtha Ait-Bekka (ALG)	2
Omar Elsayed (EGY)	0
Stefan Savković (MNE)	3

Final
Jugurtha Ait-Bekka (ALG)	WO
Stefan Savković (MNE)
