= Gymnastics at the 2022 Mediterranean Games – Women's balance beam =

Women's balance beam at the 2022 Mediterranean Games
- Venue: Miloud Hadefi Complex Omnisport Arena
- Date: 29 June 2022
- Competitors: 8
- Winning total: 13.350

Medalists
gold medal	(Italy) Martina Maggio
silver medal	(Italy) Asia D'Amato
bronze medal	(France) Carolann Héduit

The Women's balance beam competition at the 2022 Mediterranean Games was held on 29 June 2022 at the Miloud Hadefi Complex Omnisport Arena.

== Qualification ==
Position	Gymnast	D-score	E-score	Penalty	Total	Notes
1	Martina Maggio (ITA)	5.4	8.350		13.750	Q
2	Asia D'Amato (ITA)	5.6	8.150		13.750	Q
3	Carolann Héduit (FRA)	5.6	7.900		13.500	Q
4	Morgane Osyssek-Reimer (FRA)	5.6	7.800		13.400	Q
5	Giorgia Villa (ITA)	5.1	8.100		13.200	–
6	Lorette Charpy (FRA)	5.3	7.900		13.200	–
7	Angela Andreoli (ITA)	5.9	7.100		13.000	–
8	Laura Casabuena (ESP)	5.6	7.100		12.700	Q
9	Ana Đerek (CRO)	5.3	7.200		12.500	Q
10	Ana Filipa Martins (POR)	4.9	7.550		12.450	Q
11	Emma Fernández (ESP)	5.1	7.150		12.250	Q
12	Célia Serber (FRA)	4.9	7.200		12.100	–
13	Claudia Villalba (ESP)	4.5	7.500		12.000	–
14	Marina Parente (POR)	4.6	7.400		12.000	R1
15	Sevgi Kayışoğlu (TUR)	5.1	6.800		11.900	R2
16	Tatiana Bachurina (CYP)	4.6	7.150		11.750	R3

== Final ==
Position	Gymnast	D-score	E-score	Penalty	Total
1st place, gold medalist(s)	Martina Maggio (ITA)	5.6	7.950		13.550
2nd place, silver medalist(s)	Asia D'Amato (ITA)	5.6	7.650		13.250
3rd place, bronze medalist(s)	Carolann Héduit (FRA)	5.5	7.600		13.100
4	Morgane Osyssek-Reimer (FRA)	5.6	7.250	-0.1	12.750
5	Laura Casabuena (ESP)	5.9	6.750		12.650
6	Ana Đerek (CRO)	5.2	7.400		12.600
7	Ana Filipa Martins (POR)	5.2	6.200		11.400
8	Emma Fernández (ESP)	5.1	5.300		10.400
