= San Marino at the 2022 Mediterranean Games =

- IOC code: SMR
- NOC: Sammarinese National Olympic Committee

in Oran, Algeria 25 June 2022 – 6 July 2022
- Medals Ranked 17th: Gold 2 Silver 1 Bronze 3 Total 6

Mediterranean Games appearances (overview)
- 1987; 1991; 1993; 1997; 2001; 2005; 2009; 2013; 2018; 2022

San Marino competed at the 2022 Mediterranean Games held in Oran, Algeria from 25 June to 6 July 2022.

== Medalists ==
Medal	Name	Sport	Event	Date
Gold	Myles Amine	Wrestling	Men's freestyle 86 kg	28 June
Gold	Stella Paoletti; Anna Maria Ciucci	Boules	Raffa, women's doubles	29 June
Silver	Enrico Dall'Olmo; Jacopo Frisoni	Boules	Raffa, men's doubles	29 June
Bronze	Malik Amine	Wrestling	Men's freestyle 74 kg	28 June
Bronze	Enrico Dall'Olmo	Boules	Raffa, men's singles	29 June
Bronze	Gian Marco Berti	Shooting	Men's trap	3 July

== Archery ==
San Marino competed in archery.

Athlete	Event	Ranking round		Round of 64	Round of 32	Round of 16	Quarterfinals	Semifinals	Final / BM	
Athlete	Event	Score	Seed	Opposition Score	Opposition Score	Opposition Score	Opposition Score	Opposition Score	Opposition Score	Rank
Jacopo Forlani	Men's Individual	566	32	Loizou (CYP); L 2–6	Did not advance					

== Boules ==
San Marino won three medals in boules.

== Shooting ==
San Marino won one medal in shooting.

== Swimming ==
San Marino competed in swimming.

Men

Athlete	Event	Heat		Final	
Athlete	Event	Time	Rank	Time	Rank
Loris Bianchi	200 m freestyle	1:54.94	14	did not advance	
Loris Bianchi	400 m freestyle	4:00.64	10	did not advance	
Loris Bianchi	1500 m freestyle	16:03.32	9	did not advance	
Giacomo Casadei	50 m breaststroke	29.49	16	did not advance	
Giacomo Casadei	100 m breaststroke	1:04.52	15	did not advance	
Giacomo Casadei	200 m breaststroke	2:20.31	12	did not advance	
Alessandro Rebosio	50 m butterfly	26.26	17	did not advance	
Alessandro Rebosio	100 m butterfly	57.08	16	did not advance	
Alessandro Rebosio	200 m butterfly	2:06.26	10	did not advance	

== Taekwondo ==
San Marino competed in Taekwondo.

Legend

- PTG — Won by Points Gap
- SUP — Won by superiority
- OT — Won on over time (Golden Point)
- DQ — Won by disqualification
- PUN — Won by punitive declaration
- WD — Won by withdrawal

Men

Athlete	Event	Round of 32	Round of 16	Quarterfinals	Semifinals	Final	Rank
Michele Ceccaroni	68 kg	Bye	Brečić (CRO); L 6-26	—N/a	—N/a	—N/a	9

== Tennis ==
San Marino competed in tennis.

Men

Athlete	Event	Round of 32	Round of 16	Quarterfinals	Semifinals	Final / BM	
Athlete	Event	Opposition Score	Opposition Score	Opposition Score	Opposition Score	Opposition Score	Rank
Marco De Rossi	Singles	A Elsayed (EGY); L 3–6, 4–6	Did not advance				

== Wrestling ==
San Marino won two medals in wrestling.

Men's freestyle wrestling

Athlete	Event	Round of 16	Quarterfinal	Semifinal	Final / BM	
Athlete	Event	Opposition Result	Opposition Result	Opposition Result	Opposition Result	Rank
Malik Amine	−74 kg	Bye	Hussen (EGY); L 0–10	—N/a	Masotti (ITA); W 6–4	3rd place, bronze medalist(s)
Myles Amine	−86 kg	Aibuev (FRA); W 6–1	Badawi (EGY); W 10–0	Benferdjallah (ALG); W 10–0	Erdin (TUR); W 4–1	1st place, gold medalist(s)
