= Swimming at the 2020 European Aquatics Championships – Women's 200 metre breaststroke =

Swimming competition

Women's 200 metre breaststroke at the 2020 European Aquatics Championships
- Venue: Danube Arena
- Dates: 20 May 2021 (heats and semifinals); 21 May 2021 (final)
- Competitors: 44 from 25 nations
- Winning time: 2:21.34

Medalists
gold medal	Molly Renshaw	Great Britain
silver medal	Lisa Mamie	Switzerland
bronze medal	Yuliya Yefimova	Russia

The Women's 200 metre breaststroke competition of the 2020 European Aquatics Championships was held on 20 and 21 May 2021.

== Records ==
Before the competition, the existing world, European and championship records were as follows.

	Name	Nationality	Time	Location	Date
World record European record	Rikke Møller Pedersen	Denmark	2:19.11	Barcelona	1 August 2013
Championship record	Rikke Møller Pedersen	Denmark	2:19.84	Berlin	22 August 2014

== Results ==
The heats were started on 20 May at 10:25.

=== Heats ===
Rank	Heat	Lane	Name	Nationality	Time	Notes
1	3	4	Evgeniia Chikunova	Russia	2:23.92	Q
2	5	5	Abbie Wood	Great Britain	2:24.16	Q
3	3	3	Lisa Mamie	Switzerland	2:24.47	Q
4	4	4	Molly Renshaw	Great Britain	2:24.52	Q
5	5	4	Yuliya Yefimova	Russia	2:24.75	Q
6	4	5	Maria Temnikova	Russia	2:24.95	
7	4	3	Francesca Fangio	Italy	2:25.00	Q
8	5	3	Marina García Urzainqui	Spain	2:24.99	Q
9	3	5	Jessica Vall	Spain	2:25.17	Q
10	3	2	Martina Carraro	Italy	2:25.36	Q
11	4	2	Victoria Kaminskaya	Portugal	2:25.90	Q
12	5	0	Sophie Hansson	Sweden	2:26.08	Q
13	2	4	Kotryna Teterevkova	Lithuania	2:27.06	Q
14	2	5	Anastasia Basisto	Moldova	2:27.07	Q, NR
15	3	0	Petra Halmai	Hungary	2:27.20	Q
16	2	7	Raquel Pereira	Portugal	2:27.25	Q
17	4	6	Kristýna Horská	Czech Republic	2:27.41	Q
18	3	6	Kim Herkle	Germany	2:27.54	
19	1	3	Andrea Podmaníková	Slovakia	2:27.77	NR
20	5	6	Lisa Angiolini	Italy	2:27.78	
21	3	1	Tes Schouten	Netherlands	2:28.17	
22	2	0	Emelie Fast	Sweden	2:28.38	
23	3	8	Clara Rybak-Andersen	Denmark	2:28.41	
24	5	1	Eneli Jefimova	Estonia	2:28.64	
25	5	2	Eszter Békési	Hungary	2:28.81	
26	3	9	Martta Ruuska	Finland	2:28.96	
27	5	8	Stina Kajsa Colleou	Norway	2:29.00	
28	5	7	Bente Fischer	Germany	2:29.79	
29	4	8	Thea Blomsterberg	Denmark	2:29.98	
30	5	9	Nikoleta Trníková	Slovakia	2:30.01	
31	3	7	Tatiana Belonogoff	Russia	2:30.06	
32	2	9	Maria Romanjuk	Estonia	2:30.27	
33	2	2	Hannah Brunzell	Sweden	2:30.59	
34	2	8	Arianna Castiglioni	Italy	2:30.96	
35	4	9	Eva Kummen	Norway	2:30.97	
36	4	7	Tjaša Vozel	Slovenia	2:31.43	
37	1	4	Hazal Özkan	Turkey	2:31.65	
38	4	0	Josephine Dumont	Belgium	2:32.01	
39	2	6	Alíz Kalmár	Hungary	2:32.41	
40	2	1	Ana Blažević	Croatia	2:32.85	
41	1	5	Nina Vadovičová	Slovakia	2:33.83	
42	1	7	Lea Polonsky	Israel	2:35.94	
43	1	2	Nàdia Tudó	Andorra	2:37.55	
44	1	6	Alina Tkachenko	Ukraine	2:40.49	
	2	3	Jenna Laukkanen	Finland	Did not start	
	4	1	Laura Lahtinen	Finland	Did not start	

=== Semifinals ===
The semifinals were started on 20 May at 18:30.

==== Semifinal 1 ====
Rank	Lane	Name	Nationality	Time	Notes
1	5	Molly Renshaw	Great Britain	2:21.55	Q
2	4	Abbie Wood	Great Britain	2:21.86	Q
3	3	Marina García Urzainqui	Spain	2:24.25	q
4	6	Jessica Vall	Spain	2:24.50	q
5	7	Kotryna Teterevkova	Lithuania	2:25.98	
6	1	Petra Halmai	Hungary	2:26.10	
7	8	Kristýna Horská	Czech Republic	2:26.11	
8	2	Victoria Kaminskaya	Portugal	2:26.17	

==== Semifinal 2 ====
Rank	Lane	Name	Nationality	Time	Notes
1	5	Lisa Mamie	Switzerland	2:23.15	Q
2	4	Evgeniia Chikunova	Russia	2:23.33	Q
3	3	Yuliya Yefimova	Russia	2:23.56	q
4	6	Francesca Fangio	Italy	2:24.56	q
5	7	Sophie Hansson	Sweden	2:24.79	
6	2	Martina Carraro	Italy	2:25.07	
7	1	Anastasia Basisto	Moldova	2:26.39	NR
8	8	Raquel Pereira	Portugal	2:26.62	

=== Final ===
The final was held on 21 May at 19:19.

Rank	Lane	Name	Nationality	Time	Notes
1st place, gold medalist(s)	4	Molly Renshaw	Great Britain	2:21.34	
2nd place, silver medalist(s)	3	Lisa Mamie	Switzerland	2:22.05	
3rd place, bronze medalist(s)	2	Yuliya Yefimova	Russia	2:22.16	
4	6	Evgeniia Chikunova	Russia	2:22.17	
5	5	Abbie Wood	Great Britain	2:22.78	
6	8	Francesca Fangio	Italy	2:24.26	
7	7	Marina García Urzainqui	Spain	2:25.76	
8	1	Jessica Vall	Spain	2:25.84	
