= Wrestling at the 2022 Mediterranean Games – Men's freestyle 86 kg =

Wrestling competitions

Men's Freestyle 86 kg at the 2022 Mediterranean Games
- Venue: EMEC Hall
- Date: 27–28 June
- Competitors: 10 from 10 nations

Medalists
gold medal	Myles Amine	San Marino
silver medal	Fatih Erdin	Turkey
bronze medal	Choiras Charalambos	Cyprus
bronze medal	Akhmed Aibuev	France

The men's freestyle 86 kg competition of the wrestling events at the 2022 Mediterranean Games in Oran, Algeria, was held from 27 June to 28 June at the EMEC Hall.

== Results ==
Legend

- F — Won by fall

Round of 16
Mahmoud Badawi (EGY)	6
Fedaeddin Al-Osta (SYR)	0
Akhmed Aibuev (FRA)	1
Myles Amine (SMR)	6

Quarterfinals
Damian Iglesias (ESP)	2
Osman Hajdari (ALB)	3
Choiras Charalambos (CYP)	0
Fatih Erdin (TUR)	10
Aron Caneva (ITA)	1
Fateh Benferdjallah (ALG)	5
Mahmoud Badawi (EGY)	0
Myles Amine (SMR)	10

Semifinals
Osman Hajdari (ALB)	0
Fatih Erdin (TUR)	10
Fateh Benferdjallah (ALG)	0
Myles Amine (SMR)	10

Final
Fatih Erdin (TUR)	1
Myles Amine (SMR)	4

Repechage round 1
Akhmed Aibuev (FRA)	11
Mahmoud Badawi (EGY)	0

Bronze medals
Choiras Charalambos (CYP)	6
Osman Hajdari (ALB)	1
Akhmed Aibuev (FRA)	10
Fateh Benferdjallah (ALG)	1
