= Swimming at the 2022 Mediterranean Games – Men's 400 metre freestyle =

Men's 400 metre freestyle at the 2022 Mediterranean Games
- Location: Bir El Djir, Algeria
- Dates: 3 July
- Competitors: 15 from 11 nations
- Winning time: 3:48.72

Medalists
gold medal	Dimitrios Markos	Greece
silver medal	Joris Bouchaut	France
bronze medal	Luca De Tullio	Italy

The men's 400 metre freestyle competition at the 2022 Mediterranean Games was held on 3 July 2022 at the Aquatic Center of the Olympic Complex in Bir El Djir.

== Records ==
Prior to this competition, the existing world and Mediterranean Games records were as follows:

World record	Paul Biedermann (GER)	3:40.07	Rome, Italy	26 July 2009
Mediterranean Games record	Oussama Mellouli (TUN)	3:42.71	Pescara, Italy	27 June 2009

== Results ==
=== Heats ===
The heats were started at 10:00.

Rank	Heat	Lane	Name	Nationality	Time	Notes
1	3	5	Joris Bouchaut	France	3:52.40	Q
2	3	3	Batuhan Filiz	Turkey	3:52.52	Q
3	3	7	Sašo Boškan	Slovenia	3:53.40	Q
4	2	4	Luca De Tullio	Italy	3:53.75	Q
5	2	6	Carlos Quijada	Spain	3:54.25	Q
6	2	5	Dimitrios Markos	Greece	3:54.33	Q
7	3	2	Alessio Proietti Colonna	Italy	3:56.83	Q
8	2	2	Luis Domínguez	Spain	3:57.76	Q
9	2	3	Efe Turan	Turkey	3:59.46	
10	2	7	Loris Bianchi	San Marino	4:00.64	
11	3	6	Mohamed Anisse Djaballah	Algeria	4:03.41	
12	1	5	Théo Druenne	Monaco	4:08.36	
13	2	1	Christos Manoli	Cyprus	4:09.52	
14	3	1	Lounis Khendriche	Algeria	4:10.15	
15	1	3	Abdulhay Ashour	Libya	4:29.51	NR
	1	4	Ahmed Jaouadi	Tunisia	Did not start	
	2	8	Mohamed Lagili	Tunisia	Did not start	
	3	8	Konstantinos Stamou	Greece	Did not start	

=== Final ===
The final was held at 18:00.

Rank	Lane	Name	Nationality	Time	Notes
1st place, gold medalist(s)	7	Dimitrios Markos	Greece	3:48.72	
2nd place, silver medalist(s)	4	Joris Bouchaut	France	3:49.45	
3rd place, bronze medalist(s)	6	Luca De Tullio	Italy	3:50.11	
4	5	Batuhan Filiz	Turkey	3:50.26	
5	2	Carlos Quijada	Spain	3:52.23	
6	3	Sašo Boškan	Slovenia	3:52.24	
7	8	Luis Domínguez	Spain	3:54.48	
8	1	Alessio Proietti Colonna	Italy	3:56.12	
