= Swimming at the 2022 Mediterranean Games – Men's 200 metre freestyle =

Men's 200 metre freestyle at the 2022 Mediterranean Games
- Location: Bir El Djir, Algeria
- Dates: 5 July
- Competitors: 16 from 12 nations
- Winning time: 1:47.33

Medalists
gold medal	Filippo Megli	Italy
silver medal	Dimitrios Markos	Greece
bronze medal	Luis Domínguez	Spain

The men's 200 metre freestyle competition at the 2022 Mediterranean Games was held on 5 July 2022 at the Aquatic Center of the Olympic Complex in Bir El Djir.

== Records ==
Prior to this competition, the existing world and Mediterranean Games records were as follows:

World record	Paul Biedermann (GER)	1:42.00	Rome, Italy	28 July 2009
Mediterranean Games record	Oussama Mellouli (TUN)	1:46.44	Pescara, Italy	30 June 2009

== Results ==
=== Heats ===
The heats were started at 10:40.

Rank	Heat	Lane	Name	Nationality	Time	Notes
1	3	5	Filippo Megli	Italy	1:48.08	Q
2	1	5	Luis Domínguez	Spain	1:49.10	Q
3	3	4	Baturalp Ünlü	Turkey	1:49.64	Q
4	2	4	Alessio Proietti Colonna	Italy	1:49.94	Q
5	2	3	Sašo Boškan	Slovenia	1:50.08	Q
6	1	6	Joris Bouchaut	France	1:50.12	Q
7	3	6	Efe Turan	Turkey	1:50.97	Q
8	2	5	Dimitrios Markos	Greece	1:51.10	Q
9	2	2	Gabriel Lopes	Portugal	1:52.37	
10	2	6	Tom Hug-Dreyfus	France	1:53.40	
11	1	4	Mohamed Lagili	Tunisia	1:53.46	
12	1	3	Mohamed Anisse Djaballah	Algeria	1:53.69	
13	1	2	Sofiane Achour Talet	Algeria	1:53.94	
14	3	2	Loris Bianchi	San Marino	1:54.94	
15	3	7	Christos Manoli	Cyprus	1:58.20	
16	2	7	Abdulhay Ashour	Libya	2:03.53	
	3	3	Mario Mollà	Spain	Did not start	

=== Final ===
The final was held at 18:20.

Rank	Lane	Name	Nationality	Time	Notes
1st place, gold medalist(s)	4	Filippo Megli	Italy	1:47.33	
2nd place, silver medalist(s)	8	Dimitrios Markos	Greece	1:48.11	
3rd place, bronze medalist(s)	5	Luis Domínguez	Spain	1:48.33	
4	6	Alessio Proietti Colonna	Italy	1:48.61	
5	3	Baturalp Ünlü	Turkey	1:49.11	
6	2	Sašo Boškan	Slovenia	1:49.15	
7	7	Joris Bouchaut	France	1:49.54	
8	1	Efe Turan	Turkey	1:51.68	
