= Wrestling at the 2022 Mediterranean Games =

Wrestling competition

- Venue: EMEC Hall
- Dates: 26–29 June

The wrestling competition at the 2022 Mediterranean Games was held from 26 to 29 June at the EMEC Hall in Oran. The men's greco-Roman style 97 kg events were removed from the program because there was not enough participation. Albania, Algeria and San Marino won their first gold medals in the Wrestling at the Mediterranean Games.

== Competition schedule ==
All times are (UTC+1)

Date	Time	Event
26 June	10.00-13.00	Elimination rounds GR – 60-67-77-87-97-130 kg
26 June	17.00-19.00	Semi-final GR – 60-67-77-87-97-130 kg
27 June	10.00-13.00	Elimination rounds LL – 57-65-74-86-97-125 kg & Repechage GR – 60-67-77-87-97-130 kg
27 June	17.00-19.00	Semi-final LL 57- 65-74-86-97-125 kg
27 June	19.00-20.30	Finals GR – 60-67-77-87-97-130 kg
28 June	10.00-13.00	Elimination rounds LF – 50-53-57-62-68-76 kg & Repechage LL – 57-65-74-86-97-125 kg
28 June	17.00-19.00	Semi-final LF – 50-53-57-62-68-76 kg
28 June	19.00-20.30	Finals LL – 57-65-74-86-97-125 kg
29 June	18.00-19.00	Repechages LF – 50-53-57-62-68-76 kg
29 June	19.00-20.30	Finals LF – 50-53-57-62-68-76 kg

== Medal table ==
* Host nation (Algeria)

Rank	Nation	Gold	Silver	Bronze	Total
1	Turkey	7	5	2	14
2	Serbia	2	0	1	3
3	France	1	3	4	8
4	Egypt	1	2	6	9
5	Algeria*	1	2	0	3
6	Tunisia	1	1	3	5
7	Albania	1	0	1	2
7	Greece	1	0	1	2
7	North Macedonia	1	0	1	2
7	San Marino	1	0	1	2
11	Italy	0	3	3	6
12	Spain	0	1	2	3
13	Croatia	0	0	1	1
13	Cyprus	0	0	1	1
Totals (14 entries)		17	17	27	61

== Medalists ==
=== Men's freestyle ===
Event	Gold	Silver	Bronze
57 kg	Muhammet Karavuş; Turkey	Levan Metreveli; Spain	Studd Morris; Italy
65 kg	Zelimkhan Abakarov; Albania	Yehia Hafez; Egypt	Stevan Mićić; Serbia
65 kg	Zelimkhan Abakarov; Albania	Yehia Hafez; Egypt	Vladimir Egorov; North Macedonia
74 kg	Amr Reda Hussen; Egypt	Samet Ak; Turkey	Malik Amine; San Marino
74 kg	Amr Reda Hussen; Egypt	Samet Ak; Turkey	Islam Dudaev; Albania
86 kg	Myles Amine; San Marino	Fatih Erdin; Turkey	Choiras Charalambos; Cyprus
86 kg	Myles Amine; San Marino	Fatih Erdin; Turkey	Akhmed Aibuev; France
97 kg	Magomedgaji Nurov; North Macedonia	Feyzullah Aktürk; Turkey	Mohamed Saadaoui; Tunisia
125 kg	Magomedgadzhi Nurasulov; Serbia	Abraham Conyedo; Italy	Salim Ercan; Turkey
125 kg	Magomedgadzhi Nurasulov; Serbia	Abraham Conyedo; Italy	Youssif Hemida; Egypt

=== Men's Greco-Roman ===
Event	Gold	Silver	Bronze
60 kg	Kerem Kamal; Turkey	Léo Tudezca; France	Haithem Mahmoud; Egypt
60 kg	Kerem Kamal; Turkey	Léo Tudezca; France	Ruben Marvice; Italy
67 kg	Murat Fırat; Turkey	Ishak Ghaiou; Algeria	Omar Abdelrahman; Egypt
67 kg	Murat Fırat; Turkey	Ishak Ghaiou; Algeria	Gagik Snjoyan; France
77 kg	Viktor Nemeš; Serbia	Abdelkrim Ouakali; Algeria	Antonio Kamenjašević; Croatia
77 kg	Viktor Nemeš; Serbia	Abdelkrim Ouakali; Algeria	Georgios Prevolarakis; Greece
87 kg	Bachir Sid Azara; Algeria	Mirco Minguzzi; Italy	Ali Cengiz; Turkey
87 kg	Bachir Sid Azara; Algeria	Mirco Minguzzi; Italy	Noureldin Hassan; Egypt
97 kg	no competitors		
130 kg	Osman Yıldırım; Turkey	Abdellatif Mohamed; Egypt	Amine Guennichi; Tunisia

=== Women's freestyle ===
Event	Gold	Silver	Bronze
50 kg	Evin Demirhan; Turkey	Julie Sabatié; France	Sarra Hamdi; Tunisia
53 kg	Maria Prevolaraki; Greece	Zeynep Yetgil; Turkey	Marina Rueda; Spain
53 kg	Maria Prevolaraki; Greece	Zeynep Yetgil; Turkey	Shaimaa Atef Mohamed; Egypt
57 kg	Bediha Gün; Turkey	Siwar Bousetta; Tunisia	Tatiana Debien; France
62 kg	Marwa Amri; Tunisia	Améline Douarre; France	Lydia Pérez; Spain
68 kg	Pauline Lecarpentier; France	Buse Tosun; Turkey	Dalma Caneva; Italy
76 kg	Yasemin Adar; Turkey	Enrica Rinaldi; Italy	Kendra Dacher; France
76 kg	Yasemin Adar; Turkey	Enrica Rinaldi; Italy	Samar Amer; Egypt

== Participating nations ==
139 wrestlers from 19 countries:

1. Albania (6)
2. Algeria (17)
3. Croatia (3)
4. Cyprus (2)
5. Egypt (15)
6. Spain (12)
7. France (13)
8. Greece (6)
9. Italy (17)
10. Kosovo (2)
11. Morocco (2)
12. North Macedonia (3)
13. Portugal (1)
14. Slovenia (1)
15. San Marino (2)
16. Serbia (5)
17. Syria (6)
18. Tunisia (9)
19. Turkey (17)
