= Sailing at the 2022 Mediterranean Games =

- Venue: Nautical Base Les Andalouses
- Dates: 27 June – 3 July

Sailing competitions at the 2022 Mediterranean Games were held from 27 June to 3 July 2022 at the Nautical Base Les Andalouses in El Ançor.

== Medal summary ==
=== Men's events ===
Event	Gold	Silver	Bronze
Laser	Jean-Baptiste Bernaz; France	Joel Rodríguez; Spain	Giovanni Coccoluto Giorgetti; Italy
iQFOiL	Nicolò Renna; Italy	Tom Arnoux; France	Luca Di Tomassi; Italy

=== Women's events ===
Event	Gold	Silver	Bronze
Laser Radial	Marie Barrué; France	Chiara Benini Floriani; Italy	Ecem Güzel; Turkey
iQFOiL	Hélène Noesmoen; France	Marta Maggetti; Italy	Palma Čargo; Croatia

=== Medal table ===
Rank	Nation	Gold	Silver	Bronze	Total
1	France	3	1	0	4
2	Italy	1	2	2	5
3	Spain	0	1	0	1
4	Croatia	0	0	1	1
4	Turkey	0	0	1	1
Totals (5 entries)		4	4	4	12
