= Gymnastics at the 2022 Mediterranean Games – Women's artistic individual all-around =

Women's artistic individual all-around at the 2022 Mediterranean Games
- Venue: Miloud Hadefi Complex Omnisport Arena
- Date: 28 June 2022
- Competitors: 16
- Winning total: 54.864

Medalists
gold medal	(Italy) Martina Maggio
silver medal	(Italy) Asia D'Amato
bronze medal	(France) Carolann Héduit

The Women's artistic individual all-around competition at the 2022 Mediterranean Games was held on 28 June 2022 at the Miloud Hadefi Complex Omnisport Arena.

== Qualification ==
Position	Gymnast	Vault (gymnastics)	Uneven bars	Balance beam	Floor (gymnastics)	Total	Notes
1	Martina Maggio (ITA)	13.650	13.800	13.750	13.500	54.700	Q
2	Asia D'Amato (ITA)	13.850	13.600	13.750	13.200	54.400	Q
3	Carolann Héduit (FRA)	13.750	13.500	13.500	12.000	52.750	Q
4	Lorette Charpy (FRA)	13.150	13.650	13.200	11.500	51.500	~~Q~~ WD
5	Lucija Hribar (SLO)	13.000	12.850	11.650	11.650	49.150	Q
6	Emma Fernández (ESP)	12.850	11.450	12.250	12.150	48.700	Q
7	Bengisu Yıldız (TUR)	13.000	11.800	11.600	12.050	48.450	Q
8	Laura Casabuena (ESP)	11.600	11.550	12.700	12.550	48.400	Q
9	Alba Petisco (ESP)	13.200	12.050	10.650	12.350	48.250	–
10	Jana Abdelsalam (EGY)	12.900	11.900	11.350	11.450	47.600	Q
10	Bilge Tarhan (TUR)	12.900	11.850	11.250	11.600	47.600	Q
12	Mariana Parente (POR)	12.550	10.850	12.000	11.550	46.950	Q
13	Lia Sobral (POR)	12.250	11.100	11.250	11.450	46.050	Q
14	Jana Mahmoud (EGY)	12.950	11.800	9.250	11.900	45.900	Q
15	Mafalda Costa (POR)	12.250	11.400	10.550	11.200	45.400	–
16	Tatiana Bachurina (CYP)	11.650	10.700	11.750	10.550	44.650	Q
17	Jana Aboelhasan (EGY)	12.500	10.400	10.050	11.100	44.050	–
18	Lahna Salem (ALG)	12.500	11.250	9.250	10.300	43.300	~~Q~~ WD
19	Sara King (SLO)	12.000	9.750	9.350	11.300	42.400	Q
20	Fatima Boukhatem (ALG)	12.300	10.600	8.450	10.350	41.700	Q
21	Evangelina Dimitiou (CYP)	11.600	9.400	9.800	10.550	41.350	Q

== Final ==
Position	Gymnast	Vault (gymnastics)	Uneven bars	Balance beam	Floor (gymnastics)	Total
1st place, gold medalist(s)	Martina Maggio (ITA)	13.666	13.666	13.966	13.566	54.864
2nd place, silver medalist(s)	Asia D'Amato (ITA)	14.033	13.833	13.366	12.833	54.065
3rd place, bronze medalist(s)	Carolann Héduit (FRA)	13.933	13.666	12.433	13.033	53.065
4	Lucija Hribar (SLO)	13.133	12.433	11.500	11.966	49.032
5	Emma Fernández (ESP)	12.766	11.200	12.000	12.400	48.366
6	Jana Mahmoud (EGY)	12.933	12.100	10.633	11.766	47.432
7	Laura Casabuena (ESP)	12.666	12.500	9.400	12.266	46.832
8	Bengisu Yıldız (TUR)	12.833	11.700	10.966	11.333	46.832
9	Bilge Tarhan (TUR)	12.966	11.733	10.466	10.966	46.131
10	Evangelina Dimitiou (CYP)	11.800	10.066	11.300	11.333	44.499
11	Tatiana Bachurina (CYP)	11.666	11.966	10.433	10.400	44.465
12	Mariana Parente (POR)	12.366	11.600	9.733	10.433	44.132
13	Sara King (SLO)	11.866	10.466	10.333	11.333	43.998
14	Jana Abdelsalam (EGY)	11.933	9.633	9.900	12.133	43.599
15	Lia Sobral (POR)	12.133	9.066	10.666	11.533	43.398
16	Fatima Boukhatem (ALG)	0.000	10.500	8.533	10.133	29.166
