= Shooting at the 2022 Mediterranean Games =

- Venue: Hassi Ben Okba Shooting Center
- Dates: 28 June – 3 July

Shooting competitions at the 2022 Mediterranean Games was held from 28 June to 3 July 2022 at the Hassi Ben Okba Shooting Center.

== Medal summary ==
=== Men's events ===
Event	Gold	Silver	Bronze
10 metre air pistol	Damir Mikec; Serbia	İsmail Keleş; Turkey	Luca Tesconi; Italy
10 metre air rifle	Milenko Sebić; Serbia	Miran Maričić; Croatia	Luka Lukić; Slovenia
Skeet	Stefanos Nikolaidis; Cyprus	Efthimios Mitas; Greece	Azmy Mehelba; Egypt
Trap	Oğuzhan Tüzün; Turkey	Anton Glasnović; Croatia	Gian Marco Berti; San Marino

=== Women's events ===
Event	Gold	Silver	Bronze
10 metre air pistol	Anna Korakaki; Greece	Camille Jedrzejewski; France	Zorana Arunović; Serbia
10 metre air rifle	Océanne Muller; France	Teodora Vukojević; Serbia	Živa Dvoršak; Slovenia
Skeet	Martina Bartolomei; Italy	Emmanouela Katzouraki; Greece	Diana Bacosi; Italy
Trap	Carole Cormenier; France	Maria Inês Barros; Portugal	Silvana Stanco; Italy

=== Mixed events ===
Event	Gold	Silver	Bronze
10 metre air pistol team	Serbia; Zorana Arunović; Damir Mikec	France; Camille Jedrzejewski; Florian Fouquet	Italy; Chiara Giancamilli; Luca Tesconi
10 metre air rifle team	France; Océanne Muller; Brian Baudouin	Serbia; Andrea Arsović; Lazar Kovačević	Slovenia; Živa Dvoršak; Luka Lukić
Skeet team	France; Noémie Battault; Emmanuel Petit	Italy; Diana Bacosi; Tammaro Cassandro	Italy; Martina Bartolomei; Gabriele Rossetti

=== Medal table ===
Rank	Nation	Gold	Silver	Bronze	Total
1	France	4	2	0	6
2	Serbia	3	2	1	6
3	Greece	1	2	0	3
4	Italy	1	1	5	7
5	Turkey	1	1	0	2
6	Cyprus	1	0	0	1
7	Croatia	0	2	0	2
8	Portugal	0	1	0	1
9	Slovenia	0	0	3	3
10	Egypt	0	0	1	1
10	San Marino	0	0	1	1
Totals (11 entries)		11	11	11	33
