= Raquel Pereira =

Portuguese swimmer (born 2000)

Personal information
- Nationality: Portuguese
- Born: 6 January 2000 (age 26)

Sport
- Sport: Swimming
Medal record
Women's swimming
Representing Portugal
Mediterranean Games
Bronze medal – third place	2022 Oran	200 m breaststroke

Raquel Gomes Ramos Pereira (born 6 January 2000) is a Portuguese swimmer who has set multiple national records. She competed in the women's 200 metre breaststroke event at the 2020 European Aquatics Championships, in Budapest, Hungary.
