= Swimming at the 2022 Mediterranean Games – Men's 100 metre butterfly =

Men's 100 metre butterfly at the 2022 Mediterranean Games
- Location: Bir El Djir, Algeria
- Dates: 5 July
- Competitors: 19 from 12 nations
- Winning time: 51.66

Medalists
| gold medal | Matteo Rivolta | Italy |
| silver medal | Jaouad Syoud | Algeria |
| bronze medal | Edoardo Valsecchi | Italy |

The men's 100 metre butterfly competition at the 2022 Mediterranean Games was held on 5 July 2022 at the Aquatic Center of the Olympic Complex in Bir El Djir.

== Records ==
Prior to this competition, the existing world and Mediterranean Games records were as follows:

| World record | Caeleb Dressel (USA) | 49.45 | Tokyo, Japan | 31 July 2021 |
| Mediterranean Games record | Ivan Lenđer (SRB) | 51.79 | Pescara, Italy | 28 June 2009 |

The following new records were set during this competition.

| Date | Event | Name | Nationality | Time | Record |
|---|---|---|---|---|---|
| 5 July | Final | Matteo Rivolta | Italy | 51.66 | GR |

== Results ==
=== Heats ===
The heats were started at 10:00.

| Rank | Heat | Lane | Name | Nationality | Time | Notes |
|---|---|---|---|---|---|---|
| 1 | 2 | 4 | Jaouad Syoud | Algeria | 52.52 | Q |
| 2 | 2 | 5 | Edoardo Valsecchi | Italy | 52.63 | Q |
| 3 | 1 | 4 | Matteo Rivolta | Italy | 52.97 | Q |
| 4 | 1 | 5 | Stanislas Huille | France | 53.05 | Q |
| 4 | 3 | 3 | Charles Rihoux | France | 53.05 | Q |
| 6 | 2 | 6 | Andreas Vazaios | Greece | 53.23 | Q |
| 7 | 2 | 3 | Konstantinos Stamou | Greece | 53.24 | Q |
| 8 | 3 | 6 | Đurde Matić | Serbia | 53.27 | Q |
| 9 | 3 | 5 | Diogo Ribeiro | Portugal | 53.50 | |
| 10 | 3 | 4 | Ümitcan Güreş | Turkey | 53.53 | |
| 11 | 1 | 3 | Mario Mollà | Spain | 53.59 | |
| 12 | 1 | 7 | Miguel Nascimento | Portugal | 53.87 | |
| 13 | 1 | 6 | Miguel Martínez | Spain | 54.63 | |
| 14 | 2 | 7 | Tomàs Lomero | Andorra | 55.16 | |
| 15 | 3 | 2 | Polat Uzer Turnalı | Turkey | 56.01 | |
| 16 | 1 | 2 | Alessandro Rebosio | San Marino | 57.08 | |
| 17 | 2 | 2 | Fares Benzidoun | Algeria | 57.90 | |
| 18 | 3 | 7 | Christos Manoli | Cyprus | 58.14 | |
| 19 | 3 | 1 | Alush Telaku | Kosovo | 59.70 | |

=== Final ===
The final was held at 18:00.

| Rank | Lane | Name | Nationality | Time | Notes |
|---|---|---|---|---|---|
| 1st place, gold medalist(s) | 3 | Matteo Rivolta | Italy | 51.66 | GR |
| 2nd place, silver medalist(s) | 4 | Jaouad Syoud | Algeria | 52.38 | |
| 3rd place, bronze medalist(s) | 5 | Edoardo Valsecchi | Italy | 52.53 | |
| 4 | 2 | Stanislas Huille | France | 52.66 | |
| 5 | 8 | Đurde Matić | Serbia | 52.82 | |
| 6 | 1 | Konstantinos Stamou | Greece | 52.92 | |
| 7 | 7 | Andreas Vazaios | Greece | 52.95 | |
| 8 | 6 | Charles Rihoux | France | 53.50 | |
