= Swimming at the 2022 Mediterranean Games – Men's 200 metre butterfly =

Men's 200 metre butterfly at the 2022 Mediterranean Games
- Location: Bir El Djir, Algeria
- Dates: 4 July
- Competitors: 13 from 10 nations
- Winning time: 1:57.09

Medalists
gold medal	Claudio Faraci	Italy
silver medal	Andreas Vazaios	Greece
bronze medal	Jaouad Syoud	Algeria

The men's 200 metre butterfly competition at the 2022 Mediterranean Games was held on 4 July 2022 at the Aquatic Center of the Olympic Complex in Bir El Djir.

== Records ==
Prior to this competition, the existing world and Mediterranean Games records were as follows:

World record	Kristóf Milák (HUN)	1:50.34	Budapest, Hungary	21 June 2022
Mediterranean Games record	Velimir Stjepanović (SRB)	1:56.19	Mersin, Turkey	25 June 2013

== Results ==
=== Heats ===
The heats were started at 10:45.

Rank	Heat	Lane	Name	Nationality	Time	Notes
1	1	4	Claudio Faraci	Italy	1:58.49	Q
2	2	5	Miguel Martínez	Spain	1:59.93	Q
3	2	6	Polat Uzer Turnalı	Turkey	2:00.12	Q
4	1	7	Andreas Vazaios	Greece	2:00.57	Q
5	2	4	Jaouad Syoud	Algeria	2:00.73	Q
6	1	5	Matthias Marsau	France	2:00.76	Q
7	2	3	Luca Bruno	Italy	2:00.92	Q
8	1	3	Tom Rémy	France	2:01.71	Q
9	1	6	Lounis Khendriche	Algeria	2:05.88	
10	2	2	Alessandro Rebosio	San Marino	2:06.26	
11	2	1	Christos Manoli	Cyprus	2:09.20	
12	1	2	Alush Telaku	Kosovo	2:13.84	
13	2	7	Siraj Al-Sharif	Libya	2:22.97	

=== Final ===
The final was held at 18:39.

Rank	Lane	Name	Nationality	Time	Notes
1st place, gold medalist(s)	4	Claudio Faraci	Italy	1:57.09	
2nd place, silver medalist(s)	6	Andreas Vazaios	Greece	1:57.92	
3rd place, bronze medalist(s)	2	Jaouad Syoud	Algeria	1:58.37	
4	7	Matthias Marsau	France	1:59.14	
5	5	Miguel Martínez	Spain	1:59.86	
6	3	Polat Uzer Turnalı	Turkey	2:00.54	
7	1	Luca Bruno	Italy	2:00.63	
8	8	Tom Rémy	France	2:02.96	
