= Fencing at the 2022 Mediterranean Games =

- Venue: Mohammed Ben Ahmed Convention Centre
- Dates: 3–5 July
- Competitors: 108 from 16 nations

The fencing event at the 2022 Mediterranean Games took place from 3 to 5 July in Oran, Algeria.

Athletes competed in six events. There were no team events.

== Medal summary ==
=== Men's events ===
Event	Gold	Silver	Bronze
Individual épée	Mohamed El-Sayed; Egypt	Valerio Cuomo; Italy	Matteo Tagliariol; Italy Giacomo Paolini; Italy
Individual foil	Veljko Ćuk; Serbia	Carlos Llavador; Spain	Davide Filippi; Italy Mohamed Hamza; Egypt
Individual sabre	Ziad El-Sissy; Egypt	Riccardo Nuccio; Italy	Iñaki Bravo; Spain Dario Cavaliere; Italy

=== Women's events ===
Event	Gold	Silver	Bronze
Individual épée	Giulia Rizzi; Italy	Nicol Foietta; Italy	Roberta Marzani; Italy Éloïse Vanryssel; France
Individual foil	Olga Rachele Calissi; Italy	Morgane Patru; France	Teresa Díaz; Spain İrem Karamete; Turkey
Individual sabre	Saoussen Boudiaf; Algeria	Chiara Mormile; Italy	Eloisa Passaro; Italy Rebecca Gargano; Italy

== Medal table ==
* Host nation (Algeria)

Rank	Nation	Gold	Silver	Bronze	Total
1	Italy	2	4	7	13
2	Egypt	2	0	1	3
3	Algeria*	1	0	0	1
3	Serbia	1	0	0	1
5	Spain	0	1	2	3
6	France	0	1	1	2
7	Turkey	0	0	1	1
Totals (7 entries)		6	6	12	24
