= Swimming at the 2022 Mediterranean Games – Men's 100 metre breaststroke =

Men's 100 metre breaststroke at the 2022 Mediterranean Games
- Location: Bir El Djir, Algeria
- Dates: 5 July
- Competitors: 17 from 11 nations
- Winning time: 1:00.03

Medalists
gold medal	Berkay Ömer Öğretir	Turkey
silver medal	Emre Sakçı	Turkey
bronze medal	Alessandro Pinzuti	Italy

The men's 100 metre breaststroke competition at the 2022 Mediterranean Games was held on 5 July 2022 at the Aquatic Center of the Olympic Complex in Bir El Djir.

== Records ==
Prior to this competition, the existing world and Mediterranean Games records were as follows:

World record	Adam Peaty (GBR)	56.88	Gwangju, South Korea	21 July 2019
Mediterranean Games record	Fabio Scozzoli (ITA)	1:00.36	Tarragona, Spain	24 June 2018

The following records were established during the competition:

Date	Event	Name	Nationality	Time	Record
5 July	Final	Berkay Ömer Öğretir	Turkey	1:00.03	GR

== Results ==
=== Heats ===
The heats were started at 11:11.

Rank	Heat	Lane	Name	Nationality	Time	Notes
1	3	4	Berkay Ömer Öğretir	Turkey	1:01.06	Q
2	3	5	Alessandro Pinzuti	Italy	1:01.50	Q
3	1	5	Clément Bidard	France	1:01.82	Q
4	1	4	Konstantinos Meretsolias	Greece	1:02.12	Q
5	1	3	Antoine Marc	France	1:02.13	Q
6	2	4	Emre Sakçı	Turkey	1:02.17	Q
7	2	5	Savvas Thomoglou	Greece	1:02.41	Q
8	2	3	Alessandro Fusco	Italy	1:02.44	Q
9	3	2	Moncef Aymen Balamane	Algeria	1:02.82	
10	3	3	Francisco Quintas	Portugal	1:02.86	
11	2	2	Gabriel Lopes	Portugal	1:03.20	
12	3	6	Panayiotis Panaretos	Cyprus	1:03.48	
13	2	7	Patrick Pelegrina	Andorra	1:03.82	
14	2	6	Peter John Stevens	Slovenia	1:03.96	
15	1	2	Giacomo Casadei	San Marino	1:04.52	
16	1	6	Alex Castejón	Spain	1:04.55	
17	3	7	Ramzi Chouchar	Algeria	1:05.91	

=== Final ===
The final was held at 18:50.

Rank	Lane	Name	Nationality	Time	Notes
1st place, gold medalist(s)	4	Berkay Ömer Öğretir	Turkey	1:00.03	GR
2nd place, silver medalist(s)	7	Emre Sakçı	Turkey	1:00.19	
3rd place, bronze medalist(s)	5	Alessandro Pinzuti	Italy	1:00.31	
4	3	Clément Bidard	France	1:01.17	
5	6	Konstantinos Meretsolias	Greece	1:01.70	
6	2	Antoine Marc	France	1:01.85	
7	1	Savvas Thomoglou	Greece	1:02.08	
8	8	Alessandro Fusco	Italy	1:02.26	
