= Boxing at the 2022 Mediterranean Games =

Boxing competition

- Venue: EMEC Hall
- Dates: 26 June – 1 July

The Boxing event at the 2022 Mediterranean Games was held in Oran, Algeria, from 26 June to 1 July 2022. For the first time, boxing for women is included in the Mediterranean Games.

== Medal table ==
* Host nation (Algeria)

Rank	Nation	Gold	Silver	Bronze	Total
1	Algeria*	5	5	3	13
2	Italy	3	3	4	10
3	Turkey	3	1	3	7
4	Morocco	1	2	4	7
5	Egypt	1	0	2	3
6	Serbia	1	0	1	2
7	Syria	1	0	0	1
8	France	0	2	5	7
9	Montenegro	0	2	1	3
10	Spain	0	0	3	3
11	Tunisia	0	0	2	2
12	Greece	0	0	1	1
12	Kosovo	0	0	1	1
Totals (13 entries)		15	15	30	60

== Medalists ==
=== Men's events ===
Event	Gold	Silver	Bronze
Flyweight (52kg)	Federico Serra; Italy	Said Mortaji; Morocco	Samet Gümüş; Turkey
Flyweight (52kg)	Federico Serra; Italy	Said Mortaji; Morocco	Omer Ametović; Serbia
Featherweight (57kg)	Batuhan Çiftçi; Turkey	Oussama Mordjane; Algeria	Bilel Mhamdi; Tunisia
Featherweight (57kg)	Batuhan Çiftçi; Turkey	Oussama Mordjane; Algeria	Abdellatif Zouhairi; Morocco
Lightweight (60kg)	Mohamed Hamout; Morocco	Enzo Grau; France	Abdelnacer Benlaribi; Algeria
Lightweight (60kg)	Mohamed Hamout; Morocco	Enzo Grau; France	Giuseppe Canonico; Italy
Super lightweight (63kg)	Yahia Abdelli; Algeria	Gianluigi Malanga; Italy	Shpetim Bajoku; Kosovo
Super lightweight (63kg)	Yahia Abdelli; Algeria	Gianluigi Malanga; Italy	Abdelhaq Nadir; Morocco
Welterweight (69kg)	Jugurtha Ait-Bekka; Algeria	Stefan Savković; Montenegro	Hamza El Barbari; Morocco
Welterweight (69kg)	Jugurtha Ait-Bekka; Algeria	Stefan Savković; Montenegro	Omar Elsayed; Egypt
Middleweight (75kg)	Ahmad Ghossoun; Syria	Younes Nemouchi; Algeria	Salvatore Cavallaro; Italy
Middleweight (75kg)	Ahmad Ghossoun; Syria	Younes Nemouchi; Algeria	Moreno Fendero; France
Light heavyweight (81kg)	Vladimir Mironchikov; Serbia	Mohammed Houmri; Algeria	Petar Marčić; Montenegro
Light heavyweight (81kg)	Vladimir Mironchikov; Serbia	Mohammed Houmri; Algeria	Gazimagomed Jalidov; Spain
Heavyweight (91kg)	Aziz Abbes Mouhiidine; Italy	Moh Said Hamani; Algeria	Youcef Soheb Bouafia; France
Heavyweight (91kg)	Aziz Abbes Mouhiidine; Italy	Moh Said Hamani; Algeria	Vagkan Nanitzanian; Greece
Super heavyweight (+91kg)	Yousry Hafez; Egypt	Vincenzo Fiaschetti; Italy	Chouaib Bouloudinat; Algeria
Super heavyweight (+91kg)	Yousry Hafez; Egypt	Vincenzo Fiaschetti; Italy	Djamili Dine Aboudou; France

=== Women's events ===
Event	Gold	Silver	Bronze
Minimumweight (48 kg)	Roumaysa Boualam; Algeria	Ayşe Çağırır; Turkey	Wafa Hafsi; Tunisia
Minimumweight (48 kg)	Roumaysa Boualam; Algeria	Ayşe Çağırır; Turkey	Marta López; Spain
Light flyweight (50 kg)	Giordana Sorrentino; Italy	Romane Moulai; France	Buse Naz Çakıroğlu; Turkey
Light flyweight (50 kg)	Giordana Sorrentino; Italy	Romane Moulai; France	Laura Fuertes; Spain
Bantamweight (54 kg)	Hatice Akbaş; Turkey	Bojana Gojković; Montenegro	Fatma Hadjala; Algeria
Bantamweight (54 kg)	Hatice Akbaş; Turkey	Bojana Gojković; Montenegro	Yomna Ayyad; Egypt
Lightweight (60 kg)	Hadjila Khelif; Algeria	Chaymae Rhaddi; Morocco	Amina Zidani; France
Lightweight (60 kg)	Hadjila Khelif; Algeria	Chaymae Rhaddi; Morocco	Rebecca Nicoli; Italy
Light welterweight (63 kg)	Imane Khelif; Algeria	Assunta Canfora; Italy	Gizem Özer; Turkey
Light welterweight (63 kg)	Imane Khelif; Algeria	Assunta Canfora; Italy	Thaïs Larché; France
Welterweight (66 kg)	Busenaz Sürmeneli; Turkey	Ichrak Chaib; Algeria	Oumaïma Belahbib; Morocco
Welterweight (66 kg)	Busenaz Sürmeneli; Turkey	Ichrak Chaib; Algeria	Melissa Gemini; Italy
