= Taekwondo at the 2022 Mediterranean Games – Men's +80 kg =

Taekwondo competition

Taekwondo – Men's +80 kg at the 2022 Mediterranean Games
- Venue: Mohammed Ben Ahmed Convention Centre
- Date: 3 July
- Competitors: 10 from 10 nations

Medalists
gold medal	Ivan Šapina	Croatia
silver medal	Ayoub Bassel	Morocco
bronze medal	Roberto Botta	Italy
bronze medal	Dejan Georgievski	North Macedonia

The men's +80 kg competition in taekwondo at the 2022 Mediterranean Games was held on 3 July at the Mohammed Ben Ahmed Convention Centre in Oran.

== Results ==
Legend

- PTG — Won by Points Gap
- SUP — Won by superiority
- OT — Won on over time (Golden Point)
- DQ — Won by disqualification
- PUN — Won by punitive declaration
- WD — Won by withdrawal

Round of 16
Abdelmalik Bendaikha (ALG)	6
Dinko Šegedin (BIH)	18
Ahmad Mohamed (EGY)	14
Raúl Martínez (ESP)	5

Quarterfinals
Ivan Šapina (CRO)	24
Dinko Šegedin (BIH)	3
Patrik Divkovič (SLO)	2
Roberto Botta (ITA)	10
Emre Kutalmış Ateşli (TUR)	6
Ayoub Bassel (MAR)	9
Ahmad Mohamed (EGY)	18
Dejan Georgievski (MKD)	20

Semifinals
Ivan Šapina (CRO)	18
Roberto Botta (ITA)	15
Ayoub Bassel (MAR)	^{IRM}
Dejan Georgievski (MKD)

Final
Ivan Šapina (CRO)	35
Ayoub Bassel (MAR)	25
