= Rebecca Gargano =

Italian fencer (born 1994)

Personal information
- Born: 16 December 1994 (age 31) Marino, Lazio, Italy

Sport
- Country: Italy
- Sport: Fencing
Medal record
European Games
Silver medal – second place	2015 Baku	Sabre team
Mediterranean Games
Bronze medal – third place	2022 Oran	Individual
Universiade
Gold medal – first place	2019 Naples	Sabre team

Rebecca Gargano (born 16 December 1994 in Marino, Lazio) is an Italian fencer who won one gold medal at the 2019 Summer Universiade. She also won a silver at the 2015 European Games. She won one of the bronze medals in the women's individual sabre event at the 2022 Mediterranean Games held in Oran, Algeria.

== See also ==
- Italy at the 2019 Summer Universiade
