= Libya at the 2022 Mediterranean Games =

- IOC code: LBA
- NOC: Libyan Olympic Committee

in Oran, Algeria 25 June 2022 – 6 July 2022
- Medals Ranked 24th: Gold 0 Silver 0 Bronze 1 Total 1

Mediterranean Games appearances
- 1951; 1955; 1959; 1963; 1967; 1971; 1975; 1979; 1983; 1987; 1991; 1993; 1997; 2001; 2005; 2009; 2013; 2018; 2022

Libya competed at the 2022 Mediterranean Games held in Oran, Algeria from 25 June to 6 July 2022.

== Medalists ==
Medal	Name	Sport	Event	Date
Bronze	Rashed Alswesi; Mahmud Issa	Boules	Raffa, men's doubles	29 June

== Archery ==
Libya competed in archery.

Athlete	Event	Ranking round		Round of 64	Round of 32	Round of 16	Quarterfinals	Semifinals	Final / BM	
Athlete	Event	Score	Seed	Opposition Score	Opposition Score	Opposition Score	Opposition Score	Opposition Score	Opposition Score	Rank
Majdi Aborgiba	Men's Individual	499	36	Bakri (ALG); L0-6	Did not advance					
Maran Baayou	Women's Individual	385	27	—	Coşkun (TUR); L0-6	Did not advance				
Maran Baayou; Majdi Aborgiba	Mixed team	884	12	—	—	Villard (FRA); Fichet (FRA); L 2-6	Did not advance			

== Athletics ==
Libya competed in athletics.

== Boxing ==
Libya competed in boxing.

Men

Athlete	Event	Round of 16	Quarterfinal	Semifinal	Final	Rank
Ibrahim Ali	Welterweight	Abdulhadi Nakkash (SYR); W RSC	Omar Elsayed (EGY); L 0–3	did not advance		
Asim Dawku	Middleweight	Aly Abdalla (EGY); L 0–3	did not advance			

== Boules ==
Libya won one bronze medal in boules.

== Cycling ==
Libya competed in cycling.

== Equestrian ==
Libya competed in equestrian.

== Fencing ==
Libya competed in fencing.

== Judo ==
Libya competed in judo.

== Karate ==
Libya competed in karate.

Men

Athlete	Event	Round of 16	Quarterfinals	Semifinals	Repechage	Final / BM	
Athlete	Event	Opposition Result	Opposition Result	Opposition Result	Opposition Result	Opposition Result	Rank
Nuri Abdulsalam	+84 kg	Confiac (FRA); L 2–8	—	—	—	—	10

== Sailing ==
Libya competed in sailing.

== Shooting ==
Libya competed in shooting.

== Swimming ==
Libya competed in swimming.

Men

Athlete	Event	Heat		Final	
Athlete	Event	Time	Rank	Time	Rank
Siraj Al-Sharif	100 m freestyle	56.89	20	did not advance	
Siraj Al-Sharif	200 m butterfly	2:22.97	13	did not advance	
Abdulhay Ashour	200 m freestyle	2:03.53	16	did not advance	
Abdulhay Ashour	400 m freestyle	4:29.51	15	did not advance	

== Table tennis ==
Libya competed in table tennis.

== Taekwondo ==
Libya competed in Taekwondo.

Legend

- PTG — Won by Points Gap
- SUP — Won by superiority
- OT — Won on over time (Golden Point)
- DQ — Won by disqualification
- PUN — Won by punitive declaration
- WD — Won by withdrawal

Men

Athlete	Event	Round of 32	Round of 16	Quarterfinals	Semifinals	Final	Rank
Najimuldin Birzeeq	68 kg	Bye	Reçber (TUR); L 24-34	—	—	—	9

== Weightlifting ==
Libya competed in weightlifting.

Men

Athlete	Event	Snatch		Clean & Jerk	
Athlete	Event	Result	Rank	Result	Rank
Ahsaan Shabi	73 kg	136	8	170	5
Omar Al-Ajeemi	89 kg	148	7	185	5
Ahmed Abuzriba	102 kg	158	7	190	6
