= Gloria Hooper =

Gloria Hooper may refer to:

- Gloria Hooper, Baroness Hooper (born 1939), British politician and lawyer
- Gloria Hooper (athlete) (born 1992), Italian sprinter
