= Lisa Angiolini =

Italian swimmer (born 1995)

Personal information
- Nationality: Italian
- Born: 29 June 1995 (age 31)

Sport
- Sport: Swimming
Medal record
Women's swimming
Representing Italy
European Championships (LC)
Silver medal – second place	2022 Rome	100 m breaststroke
Silver medal – second place	2026 Paris	4×100 m medley
Bronze medal – third place	2020 Budapest	4×200 m freestyle
Mediterranean Games
Gold medal – first place	2022 Oran	50 m breaststroke
Gold medal – first place	2022 Oran	100 m breaststroke
Gold medal – first place	2022 Oran	4×100 m medley
Gold medal – first place	2026 Taranto	50 m breaststroke
Gold medal – first place	2026 Taranto	200 m breaststroke
Silver medal – second place	2026 Taranto	100 m breaststroke

Lisa Angiolini (born 29 June 1995) is an Italian swimmer.

== Career ==
She competed in the women's 200 metre breaststroke event at the 2020 European Aquatics Championships, in Budapest, Hungary. She was also part of the Italian team that won the bronze medal in the women's 4 × 200 metre freestyle relay event.

At the 2022 European Aquatics Championships, held in Rome, Angiolini won the silver medal in the 100 metre breaststroke with a time of 1:06.34, which was 0.37 seconds behind gold medalist and fellow Italian Benedetta Pilato.
