= Marina García Urzainqui =

Spanish swimmer (born 1994)

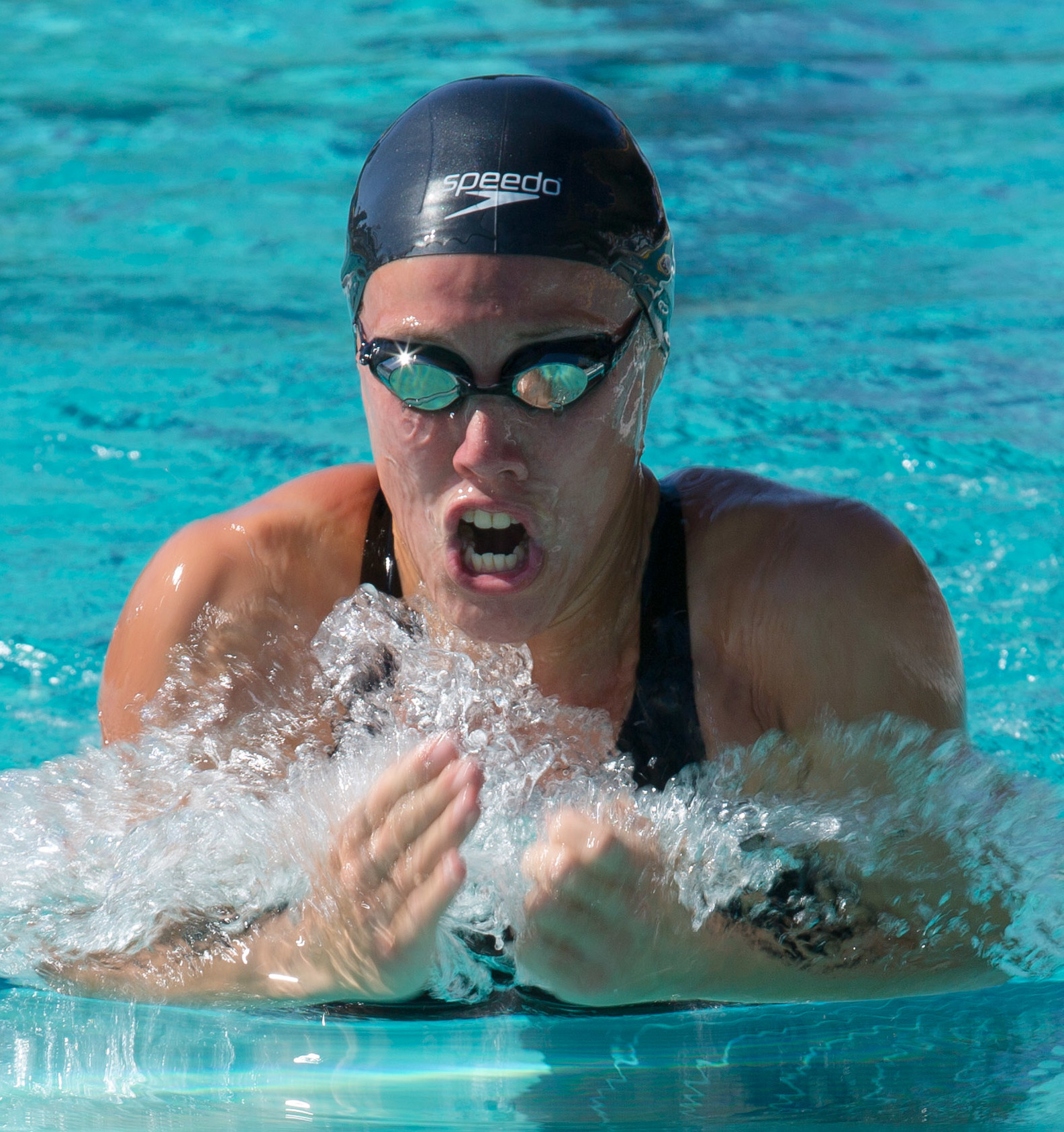

Personal information
- National team: Spain
- Born: 6 June 1994 (age 32) Barcelona, Spain
- Height: 1.68 m (5 ft 6 in)
- Weight: 57 kg (126 lb)

Sport
- Sport: Swimming
- Strokes: Breaststroke
- College team: University of California, Berkeley
Medal record
Women's swimming
Representing Spain
European Aquatics Championships
Bronze medal – third place	2012 Debrecen	100 m breaststroke
European Championships (SC)
Silver medal – second place	2012 Chartres	200 m breaststroke
Bronze medal – third place	2012 Chartres	100 m breaststroke
Mediterranean Games
Silver medal – second place	2018 Tarragona	100 m breaststroke
Silver medal – second place	2018 Tarragona	200 m breaststroke
Silver medal – second place	2022 Oran	4×100 m medley
Silver medal – second place	2022 Oran	200 m breaststroke

Marina García Urzainqui (born 6 June 1994) is a Spanish swimmer. She was born in Barcelona. At the 2012 Summer Olympics she finished 25th overall in the heats in the Women's 100 metre breaststroke and did not reach the semifinals.
