= Anita Bottazzo =

Italian swimmer (born 2003)

Personal information
- National team: Italy
- Born: 14 December 2003 (age 22) Oderzo, Italy
- Height: 1.70 m (5 ft 7 in)
- Weight: 65 kg (143 lb)

Sport
- Sport: Swimming
- Strokes: Breaststroke
- Club: G.S. Fiamme Gialle
- Coach: Annie Lazor
Medal record
Women's swimming
Representing Italy
Event	1st	2nd	3rd
European 25m Championships	0	1	0
Mediterranean Games	0	1	1
Total	0	2	1
European 25m Championships
Silver medal – second place	2023 Otopeni	4×50 m medley

Anita Bottazzo (born 14 December 2003) is an Italian competitive swimmer specializing in sprint breaststroke.

== Career ==
Born in Oderzo, Bottazzo was a rugby player before turning her focus to swimming. At 15 years old, she moved to Imola to train at the Imolanuoto Center under coach Cesare Casella. At the 2022 Mediterranean Games in Oran, she earned a silver medal in the 100-meter breaststroke and a bronze medal in the 50-metre breaststroke. At the 2023 World Aquatics Championships in Fukuoka, she finished fifth in the 50-metre breaststroke.

In 2024, Bottazzo moved to Gainesville, Florida, where she enrolled at the University of Florida to study genetics and joined the Florida Gators, being trained by Anthony Nesty. At the 2025 World Aquatics Championships, she achieved a personal best of 1'05″61, which earned her the access to the final, where she eventually finished sixth.

== International championships (50 m) ==
Meet	50 Breaststroke	100 Breaststroke
WC 2024 (age: 21)	4th	4th
