= Croatia at the 2022 Mediterranean Games =

- IOC code: CRO

in Oran, Algeria
- Medals Ranked 12th: Gold 6 Silver 7 Bronze 10 Total 23

Mediterranean Games appearances (overview)
- 1993; 1997; 2001; 2005; 2009; 2013; 2018; 2022

Other related appearances
- Yugoslavia (1951–1991)

Croatia competed at the 2022 Mediterranean Games in Oran, Algeria from 25 June to 6 July 2022.

== Medals by sport ==
Sport	Gold	Silver	Bronze	Total
Taekwondo	2	0	3	5
Artistic gymnastics	1	1	0	2
Athletics	1	1	0	2
Karate	1	0	1	2
Volleyball	1	0	0	1
Shooting	0	2	0	2
Judo	0	1	2	3
Boules	0	1	1	2
Handball	0	1	0	1
Badminton	0	0	1	1
Sailing	0	0	1	1
Wrestling	0	0	1	1
Totals (12 entries)	6	7	10	23

== Medalists ==
Medal	Name	Sport	Event	Date
Gold	Anđelo Kvesić	Karate	Men's +84 kg	27 June
Gold	Mateo Žugec	Artistic gymnastics	Men's pommel horse	29 June
Gold	Marija Tolj	Athletics	Women's discus throw	30 June
Gold	Ivan Šapina	Taekwondo	Men's +80 kg	3 July
Gold	Matea Jelić	Taekwondo	Women's 67 kg	4 July
Gold	Men's volleyball team: Bernard Bakonji Petar Đirlić Tino Hanžić Ivan Mihalj Tomislav Mitrašinović Kruno Nikačević Stipe Perić Hrvoje Pervan Marko Sedlaček Filip Šestan Petar Višić Ivan Zeljković (Team coached by Cédric Énard)	Volleyball	Men's tournament	4 July
Silver	Ria Vojković	Boules	Women's progressive throw	29 June
Silver	Jakov Vlahek	Artistic gymnastics	Men's pommel horse	29 June
Silver	Ana Viktorija Puljiz	Judo	Women's 52 kg	29 June
Silver	Miran Maričić	Shooting	Men's 10 m air rifle	30 June
Silver	Anton Glasnović	Shooting	Men's trap	3 July
Silver	Martin Marković	Athletics	Men's discus throw	3 July
Silver	Women's handball team: Tina Barišić Josipa Bebek Lucija Bešen Ema Guskić Tena Japundža Lana Jarak Ana Malec Katarina Pavlović Tena Petika Stela Posavec Sara Šenvald Andrea Šimara Antonia Tucaković Mia Tupek Nika Vojnović (Team coached by Nenad Šoštarić)	Handball	Women's tournament	6 July
Bronze	Luka Ban and Filip Špoljarec	Badminton	Men's doubles	27 June
Bronze	Ivan Kvesić	Karate	Men's 84 kg	27 June
Bronze	Antonio Kamenjašević	Wrestling	Men's Greco-Roman 77 kg	27 June
Bronze	Marino Milićević	Boules	Men's progressive throw	28 June
Bronze	Iva Oberan	Judo	Women's 63 kg	30 June
Bronze	Petrunjela Pavić	Judo	Women's 78 kg	1 July
Bronze	Bruna Duvančić	Taekwondo	Women's 49 kg	3 July
Bronze	Lovre Brečić	Taekwondo	Men's 68 kg	3 July
Bronze	Palma Čargo	Sailing	Women's windsurfer	3 July
Bronze	Nika Petanjek	Taekwondo	Women's +67 kg	4 July
