= Swimming at the 2022 Mediterranean Games =

- Dates: 1–5 July

The swimming competitions at the 2022 Mediterranean Games in Oran was held from 1 to 5 July at the Miloud Hadefi Complex Aquatic Center in Bir El Djir, Oran.

== Schedule ==
H	Heats	F	Final

M = Morning session (starting at 09:30), E = Evening session (starting at 17:30)

Men
Date →	Fri 1		Sat 2		Sun 3		Mon 4		Tue 5	
Event ↓	M	E	M	E	M	E	M	E	M	E
50 m freestyle							H	F		
100 m freestyle			H	F						
200 m freestyle									H	F
400 m freestyle					H	F				
1500 m freestyle			H			F				
50 m backstroke					H	F				
100 m backstroke	H	F								
200 m backstroke									H	F
50 m breaststroke			H	F						
100 m breaststroke									H	F
200 m breaststroke	H	F								
50 m butterfly	H	F								
100 m butterfly									H	F
200 m butterfly							H	F		
200 m individual medley					H	F				
400 m individual medley			H	F						
4 × 100 m freestyle relay						F				
4 × 200 m freestyle relay		F								
4 × 100 m medley relay							H	F		

Women
Date →	Fri 1		Sat 2		Sun 3		Mon 4		Tue 5	
Event ↓	M	E	M	E	M	E	M	E	M	E
50 m freestyle	H	F								
100 m freestyle					H	F				
200 m freestyle			H	F						
400 m freestyle									H	F
800 m freestyle				F						
50 m backstroke					H	F				
100 m backstroke									H	F
200 m backstroke			H	F						
50 m breaststroke							H	F		
100 m breaststroke			H	F						
200 m breaststroke									H	F
50 m butterfly			H	F						
100 m butterfly							H	F		
200 m butterfly	H	F								
200 m individual medley							H	F		
400 m individual medley	H	F								
4 × 100 m freestyle relay										F
4 × 200 m freestyle relay						F				
4 × 100 m medley relay								F		

== Medal summary ==
=== Men's events ===
Event	Gold		Silver		Bronze	
50 m freestyle	Kristian Gkolomeev; Greece	21.91	Miguel Nascimento; Portugal	22.01	Oussama Sahnoune; Algeria	22.22
100 m freestyle	Filippo Megli; Italy	49.00	Diogo Ribeiro; Portugal	49.02	Alessandro Bori; Italy	49.12
200 m freestyle	Filippo Megli; Italy	1:47.33	Dimitrios Markos; Greece	1:48.11	Luis Dominguez Calonge; Spain	1:48.33
400 m freestyle	Dimitrios Markos; Greece	3:48.72	Joris Bouchaut; France	3:49.45	Luca De Tullio; Italy	3:50.11
1500 m freestyle	Joris Bouchaut; France	15:10.11	Dimitrios Markos; Greece	15:11.47	Mert Kılavuz; Turkey	15:15.41
50 m backstroke	Simone Stefanì; Italy	25.00	Juan Segura; Spain	25.09	Lorenzo Mora; Italy	25.17
100 m backstroke	Evangelos Makrygiannis; Greece	54.35	Lorenzo Mora; Italy	54.50	Stanislas Huille; France	54.66
200 m backstroke	Lorenzo Mora; Italy	1:57.62	Matteo Restivo; Italy	1:57.77	Christophe Brun; France	1:58.40
50 m breaststroke	Fabio Scozzoli; Italy	26.97; GR	Emre Sakçı; Turkey	27.00	Peter John Stevens; Slovenia	27.46
100 m breaststroke	Berkay Ömer Öğretir; Turkey	1:00.03; GR	Emre Sakçı; Turkey	1:00.19	Alessandro Pinzuti; Italy	1:00.31
200 m breaststroke	Berkay Ömer Öğretir; Turkey	2:11.26	Antoine Marc; France	2:12.55	Alex Castejón; Spain	2:12.60
50 m butterfly	Diogo Ribeiro; Portugal	23.38; GR	Matteo Rivolta; Italy	23.59	Kristian Gkolomeev; Greece	23.61
100 m butterfly	Matteo Rivolta; Italy	51.66; GR	Jaouad Syoud; Algeria	52.38	Edoardo Valsecchi; Italy	52.53
200 m butterfly	Claudio Faraci; Italy	1:57.09	Andreas Vazaios; Greece	1:57.92	Jaouad Syoud; Algeria	1:58.37
200 m individual medley	Jaouad Syoud; Algeria Andreas Vazaios; Greece	1:58.83	Not awarded		Pier Andrea Matteazzi; Italy	2:00.24
400 m individual medley	Pier Andrea Matteazzi; Italy	4:13.83	Anže Ferš Eržen; Slovenia	4:19.63 NR	Pietro Paolo Sarpe; Italy	4:20.41
4 × 100 m freestyle	Italy; Luca Serio (49.79); Alessandro Bori (48.85); Giovanni Carraro (48.68); Filippo Megli (48.45)	3:15.77	Greece; Andreas Vazaios (49.46); Stergios Bilas (49.01); Kristian Gkolomeev (48.24); Dimitrios Markos (49.93)	3:16.64	France; Charles Rihoux (49.00); Mathias Even (49.19); Tom Hug-Dreyfus (50.22); Arthur Berol (49.63)	3:18.04
4 × 200 m freestyle	Greece; Dimitrios Markos (1:47.72); Evangelos Makrygiannis (1:52.22); Konstantinos Stamou (1:50.03); Andreas Vazaios (1:47.94)	7:17.91	Spain; Mario Mollà (1:52.59); Carlos Quijada (1:50.23); Luis Domínguez (1:49.03); Miguel Martínez (1:51.22)	7:23.07	Turkey; Baturalp Ünlü (1:49.63); Batuhan Filiz (1:49.92); Efe Turan (1:51.33); Doğa Çelik (1:52.79)	7:23.67
4 × 100 m medley	Italy; Lorenzo Mora (54.73); Alessandro Pinzuti (1:00.44); Matteo Rivolta (51.56); Alessandro Bori (49.04); Matteo Restivo^{[a]} Alessandro Fusco^{[a]} Simone Stefanì^{[a]} Filippo Megli^{[a]}	3:35.77	France; Mathys Chouchaoui (54.87); Clément Bidard (1:00.46); Stanislas Huille (52.43); Charles Rihoux (48.27); Christophe Brun^{[a]} Sergueï Comte^{[a]}	3:36.03	Turkey; Berke Saka (54.88); Berkay Ömer Öğretir (59.28); Ümitcan Güreş (52.18); Baturalp Ünlü (49.95)	3:36.29

^{a} Swimmers who participated in the heats only and received medals.

=== Women's events ===
Event	Gold		Silver		Bronze	
50 m freestyle	Lidón Muñoz; Spain	24.97	Neža Klančar; Slovenia	25.01	Kalia Antoniou; Cyprus	25.06
100 m freestyle	Kalia Antoniou; Cyprus	54.36; GR	Janja Šegel; Slovenia	54.48	Neža Klančar; Slovenia	55.31
200 m freestyle	Janja Šegel; Slovenia	1:56.68; GR	Katja Fain; Slovenia	1:57.49	Alice Mizzau; Italy	1:59.95
400 m freestyle	Deniz Ertan; Turkey	4:08.04	Katja Fain; Slovenia	4:09.07	Antonietta Cesarano; Italy	4:10.13
800 m freestyle	Merve Tuncel; Turkey	8:26.80	Deniz Ertan; Turkey	8:29.03	Martina Caramignoli; Italy	8:31.75
50 m backstroke	Nina Stanisavljević; Serbia	28.59	Anna Ntountounaki; Greece	28.68	Rafaela Azevedo; Portugal	28.86
100 m backstroke	Camila Rebelo; Portugal	1:01.34	Carlotta Zofkova; Italy	1:01.61	Carmen Weiler; Spain	1:01.98
200 m backstroke	Camila Rebelo; Portugal	2:10.41	África Zamorano; Spain	2:11.48	Ekaterina Avramova; Turkey	2:12.72
50 m breaststroke	Lisa Angiolini; Italy	30.87; GR	Ana Rodrigues; Portugal	31.31	Anita Bottazzo; Italy	31.41
100 m breaststroke	Lisa Angiolini; Italy	1:07.59	Anita Bottazzo; Italy	1:08.14	Viktoriya Zeynep Güneş; Turkey	1:08.44
200 m breaststroke	Viktoriya Zeynep Güneş; Turkey	2:26.48	Marina García; Spain	2:27.32	Raquel Pereira; Portugal	2:28.35
50 m butterfly	Anna Ntountounaki; Greece	25.95	Viola Scotto di Carlo; Italy	26.25	Sonia Laquintana; Italy	26.38
100 m butterfly	Lana Pudar; Bosnia and Herzegovina	57.55; GR	Anna Ntountounaki; Greece	58.56	Ilaria Bianchi; Italy	59.06
200 m butterfly	Lana Pudar; Bosnia and Herzegovina	2:09.18	Ana Monteiro; Portugal	2:09.32	Merve Tuncel; Turkey	2:12.59
200 m individual medley	Sara Franceschi; Italy	2:12.19	Viktoriya Zeynep Güneş; Turkey	2:12.26	Deniz Ertan; Turkey	2:14.15
400 m individual medley	Sara Franceschi; Italy	4:40.86	Deniz Ertan; Turkey	4:40.97	Alba Vázquez; Spain	4:45.63
4 × 100 m freestyle	Slovenia; Janja Šegel (54.26) GR, NR; Neža Klančar (54.07); Katja Fain (54.82); Tjaša Pintar (55.37)	3:38.52; GR, NR	France; Assia Touati (56.14); Lucile Tessariol (54.63); Marina Jehl (55.11); Océane Carnez (55.69)	3:41.57	Italy; Sonia Laquintana (56.14); Alice Mizzau (56.04); Viola Scotto di Carlo (55.67); Sofia Morini (55.01)	3:42.86
4 × 200 m freestyle	Slovenia; Janja Šegel (1:59.34); Neža Klančar (2:02.07); Katja Fain (1:57.72); Tjaša Pintar (2:00.14)	7:59.27; NR	Italy; Linda Caponi (2:00.51); Antonietta Cesarano (1:59.16); Noemi Cesarano (2:00.65); Alice Mizzau (1:59.31)	7:59.63	Turkey; Deniz Ertan (2:01.42); Merve Tuncel (2:00.63); Ecem Dönmez (2:01.13); Beril Böcekler (2:02.23)	8:05.41
4 × 100 m medley	Italy; Carlotta Zofkova (1:01.52); Lisa Angiolini (1:07.32); Ilaria Bianchi (1:00.78); Sofia Morini (55.03)	4:04.65	Spain; África Zamorano (1:02.24); Marina García (1:08.63); Carla Hurtado (1:01.05); Lidón Muñoz (54.25)	4:06.17	Turkey; Ekaterina Avramova (1:01.69); Viktoriya Zeynep Güneş (1:08.66); Deniz Ertan (1:00.56); İlknur Nihan Çakıcı (56.40)	4:07.31

=== Medal table ===
* Host nation (Algeria)

Rank	Nation	Gold	Silver	Bronze	Total
1	Italy	15	7	14	36
2	Greece	6	6	1	13
3	Turkey	5	5	9	19
4	Slovenia	3	5	2	10
5	Portugal	3	4	2	9
6	Bosnia and Herzegovina	2	0	0	2
7	Spain	1	5	4	10
8	France	1	4	3	8
9	Algeria*	1	1	2	4
10	Cyprus	1	0	1	2
11	Serbia	1	0	0	1
Totals (11 entries)		39	37	38	114
