= Slovenia at the 2022 Mediterranean Games =

- IOC code: SLO
- NOC: Olympic Committee of Slovenia

in Oran, Algeria 25 June 2022 – 6 July 2022
- Medals Ranked 11th: Gold 6 Silver 8 Bronze 9 Total 23

Mediterranean Games appearances (overview)
- 1993; 1997; 2001; 2005; 2009; 2013; 2018; 2022

Other related appearances
- Yugoslavia (1951–1991)

Slovenia competed at the 2022 Mediterranean Games held in Oran, Algeria from 25 June to 6 July 2022.

== Medalists ==
Medal	Name	Sport	Event	Date
Gold	Peter Hribar; Darko Jorgić; Deni Kožul	Table tennis	Men's team	27 June
Gold	Vito Dragič	Judo	Men's +100 kg	1 July
Gold	Neja Filipič	Athletics	Women's triple jump	2 July
Gold	Janja Šegel	Swimming	Women's 200 metre freestyle	2 July
Gold	Janja Šegel; Neža Klančar; Katja Fain; Tjaša Pintar	Swimming	Women's 4 × 200 metre freestyle relay	3 July
Gold	Janja Šegel; Neža Klančar; Katja Fain; Tjaša Pintar	Swimming	Women's 4 × 100 metre freestyle relay	5 July
Silver	Neža Klančar	Swimming	Women's 50 metre freestyle	1 July
Silver	Anita Horvat	Athletics	Women's 400 metres	2 July
Silver	Katja Fain	Swimming	Women's 200 metre freestyle	2 July
Silver	Anže Ferš Eržen	Swimming	Men's 400 metre individual medley	2 July
Silver	Agata Zupin; Jerneja Smonkar; Maja Pogorevc; Anita Horvat	Athletics	Women's 4 × 400 metres relay	3 July
Silver	Janja Šegel	Swimming	Women's 100 metre freestyle	3 July
Silver	Katja Fain	Swimming	Women's 400 metre freestyle	5 July
Silver	Eugenia Bujak	Cycling	Women's time trial	
Bronze	Andraž Krapež	Badminton	Men's singles	29 June
Bronze	Tadeja Petrič	Boules	Lyonnaise, women's precision shooting	29 June
Bronze	Maruša Štangar	Judo	Women's 48 kg	29 June
Bronze	Peter John Stevens	Swimming	Men's 50 metre breaststroke	2 July
Bronze	Neža Klančar	Swimming	Women's 100 metre freestyle	3 July
Bronze	Domen Molj	Taekwondo	Men's 58 kg	4 July

== Archery ==
Slovenia competed in archery.

Men

Athlete	Event	Ranking round		Round of 64	Round of 32	Round of 16	Quarterfinals	Semifinals	Final / BM	
Athlete	Event	Score	Seed	Opposition Score	Opposition Score	Opposition Score	Opposition Score	Opposition Score	Opposition Score	Rank
Den Habjan Malavašič	Individual	657	4	Bye	Bakri (ALG); L w/o	Did not advance				
Žiga Ravnikar	Individual	649	8	Bye	Matos (POR); W 7-1	Acha (ESP); W 7-3	Gazoz (TUR); L 2-6	Did not advance		
Sergej Podkrajšek	Individual	601	26	Bye	Fichet (FRA); L 0-7	Did not advance				
Den Habjan Malavašič; Sergej Podkrajšek; Žiga Ravnikar	Team	1907	5	—		Bye	France; L w/o	Did not advance		

Women

Athlete	Event	Ranking round		Round of 32	Round of 16	Quarterfinals	Semifinals	Final / BM	
Athlete	Event	Score	Seed	Opposition Score	Opposition Score	Opposition Score	Opposition Score	Opposition Score	Rank
Ana Umer	Individual	643	3	Bye	Florent (FRA); L w/o	Did not advance			
Urška Čavič	Individual	603	18	Psarra (GRE); L 1-7	Did not advance				
Nina Corel	Individual	601	19	Florent (FRA); L w/o	Did not advance				
Urška Čavič; Nina Corel; Ana Umer	Team	1847	6	—		Greece; L w/o	Did not advance		

Mixed

Athlete	Event	Ranking round		Round of 16	Quarterfinals	Semifinals	Final / BM	
Athlete	Event	Score	Seed	Opposition Score	Opposition Score	Opposition Score	Opposition Score	Rank
Ana Umer; Den Habjan Malavašič	Mixed team	1300	3	Bye	Gkorila (GRE); Karageorgiou (GRE); L 4-5	Did not advance		

== Artistic gymnastics ==
Slovenia competed in artistic gymnastics.

== Athletics ==
Slovenia won three medals in athletics.

== Badminton ==
Slovenia competed in badminton.

== Boules ==
Slovenia competed in boules.

== Boxing ==
Slovenia competed in boxing.

Men

Athlete	Event	Round of 16	Quarterfinals	Semifinals	Final / BM	
Athlete	Event	Opposition Score	Opposition Score	Opposition Score	Opposition Score	Rank
Tadej Černoga	lightweight	Bye	Enzo Grau (FRA); L 0-3	did not advance		
Nik Nikolov Veber	light welterweight	Abdelhaq Nadir (MAR); L 0-3	did not advance			

== Cycling ==
Slovenia competed in cycling.

== Judo ==
Slovenia competed in judo.

== Karate ==
Slovenia competed in karate.

Men

Athlete	Event	Round of 16	Quarterfinals	Semifinals	Repechage	Final / BM	
Athlete	Event	Opposition Result	Opposition Result	Opposition Result	Opposition Result	Opposition Result	Rank
Niklas Tamše Marinić	−60 kg	Salmi (ALG); L 0–8	—	—	—	Meziane (FRA); L 0–1	7
Stefan Joksimović	+84 kg	Sriti (MAR); L 0–5	—	—	—	—	10

Women

Athlete	Event	Round of 16	Quarterfinals	Semifinals	Repechage	Final / BM	
Athlete	Event	Opposition Result	Opposition Result	Opposition Result	Opposition Result	Opposition Result	Rank
Urša Haberl	−50 kg	Bonnarde (FRA); W 0–0	Kontou (CYP); W 1–0	Ouikene (ALG); L 0–1	—	Pinilla (ESP); L 4–4	5
Kiti Smiljan	−68 kg	Bye	Semeraro (ITA); L 0–4	—	—	Eltemur (TUR); L 3–8	5

== Shooting ==
Slovenia competed in shooting.

== Swimming ==
Slovenia competed in swimming.

Men

Athlete	Event	Heat		Final	
Athlete	Event	Time	Rank	Time	Rank
Sašo Boškan	200 m freestyle	1:50.08	5 Q	1:49.15	6
Sašo Boškan	400 m freestyle	3:53.40	3 Q	3:52.24	6
Sašo Boškan	50 m backstroke	DNS		Did not advance	
Sašo Boškan	100 m backstroke	56.07	11	Did not advance	
Primož Šenica Pavletič	100 m backstroke	57.13	15	Did not advance	
Primož Šenica Pavletič	200 m backstroke	2:01.32	6 Q	2:00.51	5
Anže Ferš Eržen	200 m backstroke	2:00.35	2 Q	2:00.85	8
Peter John Stevens	50 m breaststroke	27.70	4 Q	27.46	3rd place, bronze medalist(s)
Peter John Stevens	100 m breaststroke	1:03.96	14	Did not advance	
Anže Ferš Eržen	200 m individual medley	2:04.54	9	Did not advance	
Anže Ferš Eržen	400 m individual medley	4:23.00	1 Q	4:19.63 NR	2nd place, silver medalist(s)
Sašo Boškan; Peter John Stevens; Anže Ferš Eržen; Primož Šenica Pavletič	4 × 100 m medley relay	3:43.51	5 Q	3:41.38	7

Women

Athlete	Event	Heat		Final	
Athlete	Event	Time	Rank	Time	Rank
Tjaša Pintar	50 m freestyle	26.32	15	Did not advance	
Neža Klančar	50 m freestyle	25.25	3 Q	25.01	2nd place, silver medalist(s)
Neža Klančar	100 m freestyle	55.70	3 Q	55.31	3rd place, bronze medalist(s)
Janja Šegel	100 m freestyle	55.30	2 Q	54.48	2nd place, silver medalist(s)
Janja Šegel	200 m freestyle	2:00.04	1 Q	1:56.68 GR	1st place, gold medalist(s)
Katja Fain	200 m freestyle	2:00.17	2 Q	1:57.49	2nd place, silver medalist(s)
Katja Fain	400 m freestyle	4:15.08	4 Q	4:09.07	2nd place, silver medalist(s)
Daša Tušek	400 m freestyle	4:22.60	10	Did not advance	
Daša Tušek	800 m freestyle	—		8:56.97	6
Janja Šegel	100 m backstroke	1:03.22	8 Q	Withdrew	
Tjaša Pintar	50 m breaststroke	32.25	9 Q	32.11	7
Tara Vovk	50 m breaststroke	31.39	3 Q	31.75	5
Tjaša Pintar	100 m breaststroke	1:10.98	9	Did not advance	
Tara Vovk	100 m breaststroke	1:09.97	6 Q	1:09.16	5
Neža Klančar	50 m butterfly	26.51	2 Q	26.45	4
Janja Šegel; Neža Klančar; Katja Fain; Tjaša Pintar	4 × 100 m freestyle relay	—		3:38.52 GR, NR	1st place, gold medalist(s)
Janja Šegel; Neža Klančar; Katja Fain; Tjaša Pintar	4 × 200 m freestyle relay	—		7:59.27 NR	1st place, gold medalist(s)
Janja Šegel; Tara Vovk; Tjaša Pintar; Neža Klančar	4 × 100 m medley relay	—		4:08.51 NR	5

== Table tennis ==
Slovenia competed in table tennis.

== Taekwondo ==
Slovenia competed in Taekwondo.

Legend

- PTG — Won by Points Gap
- SUP — Won by superiority
- OT — Won on over time (Golden Point)
- DQ — Won by disqualification
- PUN — Won by punitive declaration
- WD — Won by withdrawal

Men

Athlete	Event	Round of 32	Round of 16	Quarterfinals	Semifinals	Final	Rank
Domen Molj	58 kg	—	Bye	Mansour (EGY); W 27-11	Vicente (ESP); L 9-41	—	3rd place, bronze medalist(s)
Lin Kovačič	68 kg	Bye	Wasfi (MAR); W 17-15	Chamalidis (GRE); L 11-20	—	—	5
Patrik Divkovič	+80 kg	—	Bye	Botta (ITA); L 2-10	—	—	7

== Tennis ==
Slovenia competed in tennis.

== Water polo ==
Summary

Team	Event	Group stage					Semifinal	Final / BM / Pl.	
Team	Event	Opposition Score	Opposition Score	Opposition Score	Opposition Score	Rank	Opposition Score	Opposition Score	Rank
Slovenia men's	Men's tournament	Portugal; W 18–5	Serbia; L 6–22	France; W 11–7	Montenegro; L 6–11	3	—	Greece; L 12–16	6

Group play

Pos	Team	Pld	W	D	L	GF	GA	GD	Pts	Qualification
1	Serbia	4	4	0	0	65	24	+41	8	Semifinals
2	Montenegro	4	3	0	1	58	27	+31	6	Semifinals
3	Slovenia	4	2	0	2	41	45	−4	4	Fifth place game
4	France	4	1	0	3	37	55	−18	2	Seventh place game
5	Portugal	4	0	0	4	22	72	−50	0	

Source: Oran 2022

24 June 2022; 10:00	Report	Slovenia	18–5	Portugal	Oran; Referees: Arnaldo Petronilli (ITA), Emanuel Manol Taylan (TUR)
24 June 2022; 10:00	Report	Score by quarters: 5–0, 5–1, 4–2, 4–2			Oran; Referees: Arnaldo Petronilli (ITA), Emanuel Manol Taylan (TUR)
24 June 2022; 10:00	Report	Lah 6	Goals	Moreira 4	Oran; Referees: Arnaldo Petronilli (ITA), Emanuel Manol Taylan (TUR)

25 June 2022; 12:00	Report	Serbia	22–6	Slovenia	Oran; Referees: Arnaldo Petronilli (ITA), Sergio Jiménez (ESP)
25 June 2022; 12:00	Report	Score by quarters: 3–2, 3–2, 7–1, 9–1			Oran; Referees: Arnaldo Petronilli (ITA), Sergio Jiménez (ESP)
25 June 2022; 12:00	Report	Kovačević 4	Goals	Lah 3	Oran; Referees: Arnaldo Petronilli (ITA), Sergio Jiménez (ESP)

27 June 2022; 12:00	Report	Slovenia	11–7	France	Oran; Referees: Andrija Đurašković (MNE), Arnaldo Petronilli (ITA)
27 June 2022; 12:00	Report	Score by quarters: 3–1, 1–2, 4–1, 3–3			Oran; Referees: Andrija Đurašković (MNE), Arnaldo Petronilli (ITA)
27 June 2022; 12:00	Report	Zdravkovič Gligorovski 3	Goals	Roussel 2	Oran; Referees: Andrija Đurašković (MNE), Arnaldo Petronilli (ITA)

28 June 2022; 10:00	Report	Montenegro	11–6	Slovenia	Oran; Referees: Arnaldo Petronilli (ITA), Grigorios Spanoudis (GRE)
28 June 2022; 10:00	Report	Score by quarters: 3–0, 4–4, 1–2, 3–0			Oran; Referees: Arnaldo Petronilli (ITA), Grigorios Spanoudis (GRE)
28 June 2022; 10:00	Report	Vučković, L. Vukičević 3	Goals	Čanč 2	Oran; Referees: Arnaldo Petronilli (ITA), Grigorios Spanoudis (GRE)

Fifth place game

29 June 2022; 12:00	Report	Greece	16–12	Slovenia	Oran; Referees: Sergio Jiménez (ESP), Ghislain Dehon (FRA)
29 June 2022; 12:00	Report	Score by quarters: 5–1, 2–4, 5–4, 4–3			Oran; Referees: Sergio Jiménez (ESP), Ghislain Dehon (FRA)
29 June 2022; 12:00	Report	Bitsakos, Mathiopoulos 3	Goals	Lah 5	Oran; Referees: Sergio Jiménez (ESP), Ghislain Dehon (FRA)

== Weightlifting ==
Slovenia competed in weightlifting.

Men

Athlete	Event	Snatch		Clean & jerk	
Athlete	Event	Result	Rank	Result	Rank
Jure Škedelj	102 kg	135	11	167	8

Women

Athlete	Event	Snatch		Clean & jerk	
Athlete	Event	Result	Rank	Result	Rank
Nastasja Štesl	59 kg	77	8	95	9

== Wrestling ==
Slovenia competed in wrestling.

Key:

- VT (ranking points: 5–0 or 0–5) – Victory by fall.
- VB (ranking points: 5–0 or 0–5) – Victory by injury (VF for forfeit, VA for withdrawal or disqualification)
- PP (ranking points: 3–1 or 1–3) – Decision by points – the loser with technical points.
- PO (ranking points: 3–0 or 0–3) – Decision by points – the loser without technical points.
- ST (ranking points: 4–0 or 0–4) – Great superiority – the loser without technical points and a margin of victory of at least 8 (Greco-Roman) or 10 (freestyle) points.
- SP (ranking points: 4–1 or 1–4) – Technical superiority – the loser with technical points and a margin of victory of at least 8 (Greco-Roman) or 10 (freestyle) points.

Men's Greco-Roman

Athlete	Event	Round of 16	Quarterfinal	Semifinal	Repechage	Final / BM	
Athlete	Event	Opposition Result	Opposition Result	Opposition Result	Opposition Result	Opposition Result	Rank
Luka Gumilar	77 kg	Kupi (ALB); L 0–10	did not advance				13
