= Swimming at the 2022 Mediterranean Games – Women's 4 × 100 metre medley relay =

Women's 4 × 100-metre medley relay at the 2022 Mediterranean Games
- Location: Bir El Djir, Algeria
- Dates: 4 July
- Competitors: 28 from 7 nations
- Teams: 7
- Winning time: 4:04.65

Medalists
gold medal	Carlotta Zofkova; Lisa Angiolini; Ilaria Bianchi; Sofia Morini	Italy
silver medal	África Zamorano; Marina García; Carla Hurtado; Lidón Muñoz	Spain
bronze medal	Ekaterina Avramova; Viktoriya Zeynep Güneş; Deniz Ertan; İlknur Nihan Çakıcı	Turkey

The women's 4 × 100-metre medley relay competition at the 2022 Mediterranean Games was held on 4 July 2022 at the Aquatic Center of the Olympic Complex in Bir El Djir.

== Records ==
Prior to this competition, the existing world and Mediterranean Games records were as follows:

World record	United States	3:50.40	Gwangju, South Korea	28 July 2019
Mediterranean Games record	Italy	3:58.27	Tarragona, Spain	25 June 2018

== Results ==
The final was held at 18:53.

Rank	Lane	Nation	Swimmers	Time	Notes
1st place, gold medalist(s)	6	Italy	Carlotta Zofkova (1:01.52); Lisa Angiolini (1:07.32); Ilaria Bianchi (1:00.78); Sofia Morini (55.03)	4:04.65	
2nd place, silver medalist(s)	3	Spain	África Zamorano (1:02.24); Marina García (1:08.63); Carla Hurtado (1:01.05); Lidón Muñoz (54.25)	4:06.17	
3rd place, bronze medalist(s)	4	Turkey	Ekaterina Avramova (1:01.69); Viktoriya Zeynep Güneş (1:08.66); Deniz Ertan (1:00.56); İlknur Nihan Çakıcı (56.40)	4:07.31	
4	1	Portugal	Camila Rebelo (1:02.02); Ana Rodrigues (1:09.38); Mariana Cunha (59.60); Francisca Martins (56.57)	4:07.57	NR
5	2	Slovenia	Janja Šegel (1:02.50); Tara Vovk (1:10.20); Tjaša Pintar (1:00.71); Neža Klančar (55.10)	4:08.51	NR
6	5	Greece	Ioanna Sacha (1:04.10); Chara Angelaki (1:10.02); Anna Ntountounaki (58.97); Sofia Klikopoulou (56.87)	4:09.96	
7	7	Algeria	Imène Kawthar Zitouni (1:06.68); Hamida Rania Nefsi (1:14.50); Nesrine Medjahed (1:03.29); Amel Melih (56.31)	4:20.78	
