= Swimming at the 2020 European Aquatics Championships – Women's 4 × 100 metre freestyle relay =

Women's 4 × 100 metre freestyle relay at the 2020 European Aquatics Championships
- Venue: Danube Arena
- Dates: 17 May 2021
- Competitors: 72 from 16 nations
- Teams: 16
- Winning time: 3:34.17

Medalists
gold medal	Lucy Hope; Anna Hopkin; Abbie Wood; Freya Anderson; Evelyn Davis; Emma Russell	Great Britain
silver medal	Ranomi Kromowidjojo; Kira Toussaint; Marrit Steenbergen; Femke Heemskerk; Kim Busch; Robin Neumann	Netherlands
bronze medal	Marie Wattel; Charlotte Bonnet; Anouchka Martin; Assia Touati; Lison Nowaczyk	France

The Women's 4 × 100 metre freestyle relay competition of the 2020 European Aquatics Championships was held on 17 May 2021.

== Records ==
Before the competition, the existing world, European and championship records were as follows.

	Team	Time	Location	Date
World record	Australia	3:30.05	Gold Coast	5 April 2018
European record	Netherlands	3:31.72	Rome	26 July 2009
Championship record	Netherlands	3:33.62	Eindhoven	18 March 2008

== Results ==
=== Heats ===
The heats were held at 11:34.

Rank	Heat	Lane	Nation	Swimmers	Time	Notes
1	1	1	Netherlands	Kim Busch (54.59); Kira Toussaint (54.06); Marrit Steenbergen (53.95); Robin Neumann (55.60)	3:38.20	Q
2	2	3	Denmark	Signe Bro (54.01); Jeanette Ottesen (54.86); Emily Gantriis (55.42); Julie Kepp Jensen (54.59)	3:38.88	Q
3	2	1	Great Britain	Lucy Hope (54.37); Evelyn Davis (55.09); Emma Russell (55.34); Freya Anderson (54.28)	3:39.08	Q
4	1	2	France	Charlotte Bonnet (53.93); Lison Nowaczyk (55.51); Assia Touati (54.74); Anouchka Martin (55.07)	3:39.25	Q
5	1	3	Slovenia	Neža Klančar (54.49); Katja Fain (54.77); Janja Šegel (54.61); Tjaša Pintar (55.74)	3:39.61	Q, NR
6	2	6	Italy	Chiara Tarantino (55.95); Silvia Di Pietro (54.92); Costanza Cocconcelli (55.30); Federica Pellegrini (53.74)	3:39.91	Q
7	1	8	Sweden	Michelle Coleman (54.59); Alma Thormalm (56.35); Sophie Hansson (55.18); Louise Hansson (53.96)	3:40.08	Q
8	1	4	Hungary	Evelyn Verrasztó (55.81); Petra Senánszky (55.09); Panna Ugrai (55.46); Fanni Gyurinovics (54.26)	3:40.62	Q
9	1	6	Poland	Aleksandra Polańska (56.02); Kornelia Fiedkiewicz (55.14); Dominika Kossakowska (55.51); Alicja Tchórz (54.61)	3:41.28	
10	2	8	Switzerland	Maria Ugolkova (55.53); Nina Kost (54.83); Leoni Richter (55.76); Noémi Girardet (55.52)	3:41.64	
11	1	5	Israel	Andrea Murez (54.18); Anastasia Gorbenko (54.23); Daria Golovaty (56.34); Zohar Shikler (57.73)	3:42.48	
12	2	2	Ireland	Mona McSharry (55.95); Danielle Hill (55.78); Victoria Catterson (56.43); Erin Riordan (56.21)	3:44.37	NR
13	1	7	Turkey	Selen Özbilen (56.08); Viktoriya Zeynep Güneş (56.17); İlknur Nihan Çakıcı (56.01); Ekaterina Avramova (56.48)	3:44.74	
14	2	7	Latvia	Ieva Maļuka (56.12); Gabriela Ņikitina (56.85); Arina Baikova (56.85); Arina Sisojeva (1:00.17)	3:49.99	NR
15	2	5	Slovakia	Laura Benková (58.16); Teresa Ivanová (56.83); Nikoleta Trníková (59.25); Martina Cibulková (56.54)	3:50.78	
16	2	4	Kosovo	Jona Macula (1:07.84); Era Budima (1:04.95); Jona Beqiri (1:04.36); Eda Zeqiri (1:05.95)	4:23.10	

=== Final ===
The final was held at 19:01.

Rank	Lane	Nation	Swimmers	Time	Notes
1st place, gold medalist(s)	3	Great Britain	Lucy Hope (53.89); Anna Hopkin (53.59); Abbie Wood (53.90); Freya Anderson (52.79)	3:34.17	NR
2nd place, silver medalist(s)	4	Netherlands	Ranomi Kromowidjojo (53.56); Kira Toussaint (54.61); Marrit Steenbergen (54.13); Femke Heemskerk (51.99)	3:34.29	
3rd place, bronze medalist(s)	6	France	Marie Wattel (53.97); Charlotte Bonnet (53.36); Anouchka Martin (54.25); Assia Touati (54.34)	3:35.92	
4	5	Denmark	Signe Bro (53.73); Jeanette Ottesen (54.89); Julie Kepp Jensen (54.63); Pernille Blume (53.56)	3:36.81	NR
5	1	Sweden	Michelle Coleman (54.34); Sara Junevik (55.67); Sophie Hansson (54.78); Louise Hansson (53.93)	3:38.72	
6	7	Italy	Silvia Di Pietro (55.11); Margherita Panziera (54.88); Federica Pellegrini (53.94); Costanza Cocconcelli (55.15)	3:39.08	
7	2	Slovenia	Neža Klančar (54.82); Katja Fain (54.81); Janja Šegel (54.68); Tjaša Pintar (55.65)	3:39.96	
8	8	Hungary	Fanni Gyurinovics (55.19); Panna Ugrai (55.05); Petra Senánszky (55.54); Evelyn Verrasztó (56.53)	3:42.31	
