= Swimming at the 2020 European Aquatics Championships – Women's 4 × 200 metre freestyle relay =

Women's 4 × 200 metre freestyle relay at the 2020 European Aquatics Championships
- Venue: Danube Arena
- Dates: 21 May 2021
- Competitors: 56 from 13 nations
- Teams: 13
- Winning time: 7:53.15

Medalists
| gold medal | Lucy Hope; Tamryn Van Selm; Holly Hibbott; Freya Anderson; Emma Russell | Great Britain |
| silver medal | Zsuzsanna Jakabos; Fanni Fábián; Laura Veres; Boglárka Kapás; Evelyn Verrasztó | Hungary |
| bronze medal | Stefania Pirozzi; Sara Gailli; Simona Quadarella; Federica Pellegrini; Lisa Angiolini | Italy |

The Women's 4 × 200 metre freestyle relay competition of the 2020 European Aquatics Championships was held on 21 May 2021.

== Records ==
Before the competition, the existing world, European and championship records were as follows.

| | Team | Time | Location | Date |
|---|---|---|---|---|
| World record | Australia | 7:41.50 | Gwangju | 25 July 2019 |
| European record | Great Britain | 7:45.51 | Rome | 30 July 2009 |
| Championship record | Italy | 7:50.53 | Berlin | 21 August 2014 |

== Results ==
=== Heats ===
The heats were held at 11:04.

| Rank | Heat | Lane | Nation | Swimmers | Time | Notes |
|---|---|---|---|---|---|---|
| 1 | 1 | 4 | Italy | Stefania Pirozzi (2:00.01); Sara Gailli (2:00.90); Lisa Angiolini (2:01.18); Federica Pellegrini (1:57.74) | 7:59.83 | Q |
| 2 | 1 | 5 | Israel | Lea Polonsky (2:02.67); Andrea Murez (1:57.31); Daria Golovaty (2:01.76); Anastasia Gorbenko (1:58.77) | 8:00.51 | Q, NR |
| 3 | 1 | 6 | Denmark | Marina Heller Hansen (2:00.64); Helena Rosendahl Bach (1:59.34); Amalie Søby Mortensen (2:00.43); Maj Howardsen (2:01.24) | 8:01.65 | Q |
| 4 | 1 | 7 | Great Britain | Lucy Hope (2:00.22); Tamryn van Selm (1:59.78); Holly Hibbott (2:00.51); Emma Russell (2:01.17) | 8:01.68 | Q |
| 5 | 2 | 6 | Belgium | Valentine Dumont (1:58.90); Kimberly Buys (2:01.78); Lana Ravelingien (2:00.84); Lotte Goris (2:00.21) | 8:01.73 | Q, NR |
| 6 | 1 | 3 | Hungary | Zsuzsanna Jakabos (1:59.87); Evelyn Verrasztó (2:01.18); Fanni Fábián (2:00.50); Laura Veres (2:00.95) | 8:02.50 | Q |
| 7 | 2 | 3 | Poland | Aleksandra Knop (2:01.74); Aleksandra Polańska (1:59.84); Paulina Nogaj (2:02.40); Dominika Kossakowska (1:59.30) | 8:03.28 | Q |
| 8 | 2 | 5 | France | Margaux Fabre (2:01.86); Océane Carnez (2:00.04); Lucile Tessariol (2:01.92); Assia Touati (1:59.54) | 8:03.36 | Q |
| 9 | 2 | 7 | Slovenia | Janja Šegel (2:00.64); Neža Klančar (2:01.99); Tjaša Pintar (2:01.65); Katja Fain (1:59.33) | 8:03.61 | |
| 10 | 2 | 1 | Austria | Cornelia Pammer (2:01.27); Lena Opatril (2:01.65); Lena Kreundl (2:07.57); Marlene Kahler (1:59.93) | 8:10.42 | |
| 11 | 2 | 4 | Slovakia | Laura Benková (2:03.66); Zora Ripková (2:02.90); Tamara Potocka (2:01.79); Martina Cibulková (2:02.64) | 8:10.99 | NR |
| 12 | 1 | 2 | Turkey | Merve Tuncel (2:02.19); Beril Böcekler (2:03.07); Selen Özbilen (2:06.31); Deniz Ertan (2:06.05) | 8:17.62 | |
| 13 | 2 | 2 | Portugal | Francisca Martins (2:03.69); Raquel Pereira (2:06.43); Diana Durães (2:05.57); Rita Frischknecht (2:05.94) | 8:21.63 | |

=== Final ===
The final was held on 21 May 2021 at 19:49.

| Rank | Lane | Nation | Swimmers | Time | Notes |
|---|---|---|---|---|---|
| 1st place, gold medalist(s) | 6 | Great Britain | Lucy Hope (1:58.45); Tamryn Van Selm (1:58.59); Holly Hibbott (1:59.71); Freya Anderson (1:56.40) | 7:53.15 | |
| 2nd place, silver medalist(s) | 7 | Hungary | Zsuzsanna Jakabos (1:59.34); Fanni Fábián (2:00.19); Laura Veres (1:59.23); Boglárka Kapás (1:57.50) | 7:56.26 | |
| 3rd place, bronze medalist(s) | 4 | Italy | Stefania Pirozzi (1:59.63); Sara Gailli (1:59.94); Simona Quadarella (2:00.61); Federica Pellegrini (1:56.54) | 7:56.72 | |
| 4 | 8 | France | Charlotte Bonnet (1:57.31); Océane Carnez (1:59.94); Lucile Tessariol (2:00.61); Assia Touati (2:00.06) | 7:59.45 | |
| 5 | 3 | Denmark | Marina Heller Hansen (2:01.63); Helena Rosendahl Bach (1:58.50); Amalie Søby Mortensen (2:00.20); Maj Howardsen (2:01.00) | 8:01.33 | |
| 6 | 1 | Poland | Aleksandra Knop (2:01.67); Aleksandra Polańska (1:59.10); Paulina Nogaj (2:02.62); Dominika Kossakowska (2:00.46) | 8:03.85 | |
| 7 | 2 | Belgium | Valentine Dumont (1:58.61); Kimberly Buys (2:02.69); Lana Ravelingien (2:03.48); Lotte Goris (2:00.11) | 8:04.89 | |
| 8 | 5 | Israel | Daria Golovaty (2:01.71); Andrea Murez (1:59.26); Lea Polonsky (2:02.47); Anastasia Gorbenko (2:04.25) | 8:07.69 | |
