= Swimming at the 2022 Mediterranean Games – Women's 100 metre freestyle =

Women's 100 metre freestyle at the 2022 Mediterranean Games
- Location: Bir El Djir, Algeria
- Dates: 3 July
- Competitors: 18 from 11 nations
- Winning time: 54.36

Medalists
| gold medal | Kalia Antoniou | Cyprus |
| silver medal | Janja Šegel | Slovenia |
| bronze medal | Neža Klančar | Slovenia |

The women's 100 metre freestyle competition at the 2022 Mediterranean Games was held on 3 July 2022 at the Aquatic Center of the Olympic Complex in Bir El Djir.

== Records ==
Prior to this competition, the existing world and Mediterranean Games records were as follows:

| World record | Sarah Sjöström (SWE) | 51.71 | Budapest, Hungary | 23 July 2017 |
| Mediterranean Games record | Malia Metella (FRA) | 54.72 | Pescara, Italy | 27 June 2009 |

The following records were established during the competition:

| Date | Event | Name | Nationality | Time | Record |
|---|---|---|---|---|---|
| 3 July | Final | Kalia Antoniou | Cyprus | 54.36 | GR |

== Results ==
=== Heats ===
The heats were started at 11:14.

| Rank | Heat | Lane | Name | Nationality | Time | Notes |
|---|---|---|---|---|---|---|
| 1 | 3 | 4 | Kalia Antoniou | Cyprus | 55.11 | Q |
| 2 | 2 | 4 | Janja Šegel | Slovenia | 55.30 | Q |
| 3 | 1 | 4 | Neža Klančar | Slovenia | 55.70 | Q |
| 4 | 3 | 3 | Lucile Tessariol | France | 55.75 | Q |
| 5 | 1 | 3 | Marina Jehl | France | 55.89 | Q |
| 6 | 3 | 6 | Sofia Morini | Italy | 55.90 | Q |
| 7 | 3 | 5 | Lidón Muñoz | Spain | 56.22 | Q |
| 8 | 1 | 5 | Nina Stanisavljević | Serbia | 56.26 | Q |
| 9 | 2 | 3 | Alice Mizzau | Italy | 56.30 | |
| 10 | 2 | 2 | Anna Hadjiloizou | Cyprus | 56.57 | |
| 11 | 2 | 5 | Carmen Weiler | Spain | 57.02 | |
| 12 | 3 | 7 | Sofia Klikopoulou | Greece | 57.03 | |
| 13 | 1 | 2 | Francisca Martins | Portugal | 57.48 | |
| 14 | 1 | 6 | İlknur Nihan Çakıcı | Turkey | 57.66 | |
| 15 | 3 | 1 | Nesrine Medjahed | Algeria | 58.00 | |
| 16 | 2 | 7 | Chrysoula Mitsakou | Greece | 58.28 | |
| 17 | 1 | 7 | Ana Rodrigues | Portugal | 59.10 | |
| 18 | 2 | 1 | Nàdia Tudó | Andorra | 1:00.02 | |
| | 2 | 6 | Ekaterina Avramova | Turkey | Did not start | |
| | 3 | 2 | Amel Melih | Algeria | Did not start | |

=== Final ===
The final was held at 18:31.

| Rank | Lane | Name | Nationality | Time | Notes |
|---|---|---|---|---|---|
| 1st place, gold medalist(s) | 4 | Kalia Antoniou | Cyprus | 54.36 | GR |
| 2nd place, silver medalist(s) | 5 | Janja Šegel | Slovenia | 54.48 | |
| 3rd place, bronze medalist(s) | 3 | Neža Klančar | Slovenia | 55.31 | |
| 4 | 1 | Lidón Muñoz | Spain | 55.35 | |
| 5 | 6 | Lucile Tessariol | France | 55.49 | |
| 6 | 7 | Sofia Morini | Italy | 55.56 | |
| 7 | 2 | Marina Jehl | France | 55.85 | |
| 8 | 8 | Nina Stanisavljević | Serbia | 56.39 | |
