= Swimming at the 2022 Mediterranean Games – Women's 200 metre freestyle =

Women's 200 metre freestyle at the 2022 Mediterranean Games
- Location: Bir El Djir, Algeria
- Dates: 2 July
- Competitors: 16 from 9 nations
- Winning time: 1:56.68

Medalists
gold medal	Janja Šegel	Slovenia
silver medal	Katja Fain	Slovenia
bronze medal	Alice Mizzau	Italy

The women's 200 metre freestyle competition at the 2022 Mediterranean Games was held on 2 July 2022 at the Aquatic Center of the Olympic Complex in Bir El Djir.

== Records ==
Prior to this competition, the existing world and Mediterranean Games records were as follows:

World record	Federica Pellegrini (ITA)	1:52.98	Rome, Italy	29 July 2009
Mediterranean Games record	Patricia Castro (ESP)	1:58.91	Pescara, Italy	30 June 2009

The following records were established during the competition:

Date	Event	Name	Nationality	Time	Record
2 July	Final	Janja Šegel	Slovenia	1:56.68	GR

== Results ==
=== Heats ===
The heats were started at 10:20.

Rank	Heat	Lane	Name	Nationality	Time	Notes
1	2	4	Janja Šegel	Slovenia	2:00.04	Q
2	3	4	Katja Fain	Slovenia	2:00.17	Q
3	2	3	Lucile Tessariol	France	2:00.42	Q
4	1	4	Alice Mizzau	Italy	2:01.04	Q
5	3	5	Océane Carnez	France	2:01.11	Q
6	2	3	Noemi Cesarano	Italy	2:01.54	Q
7	1	3	Ainhoa Campabadal	Spain	2:02.20	Q
8	2	6	Francisca Martins	Portugal	2:02.38	Q
9	3	2	Tamila Holub	Portugal	2:02.45	
10	2	5	Merve Tuncel	Turkey	2:02.47	
11	1	6	Xanthi Mitsakou	Greece	2:02.91	
12	3	6	Paula Juste	Spain	2:03.51	
13	1	5	Beril Böcekler	Turkey	2:04.53	
14	2	2	Chrysoula Mitsakou	Greece	2:06.42	
15	1	2	Lilia Sihem Midouni	Algeria	2:11.14	
16	2	7	Sara Dande	Albania	2:19.31	

=== Final ===
The final was held at 18:18.

Rank	Lane	Name	Nationality	Time	Notes
1st place, gold medalist(s)	4	Janja Šegel	Slovenia	1:56.68	GR
2nd place, silver medalist(s)	5	Katja Fain	Slovenia	1:57.49	
3rd place, bronze medalist(s)	6	Alice Mizzau	Italy	1:59.95	
4	3	Lucile Tessariol	France	2:00.40	
5	2	Océane Carnez	France	2:01.12	
6	7	Noemi Cesarano	Italy	2:01.21	
7	8	Francisca Martins	Portugal	2:02.02	
8	1	Ainhoa Campabadal	Spain	2:02.20	
