= Swimming at the 2022 Mediterranean Games – Women's 50 metre freestyle =

Women's 50 metre freestyle at the 2022 Mediterranean Games
- Location: Bir El Djir, Algeria
- Dates: 1 July
- Competitors: 21 from 11 nations
- Winning time: 24.97

Medalists
| gold medal | Lidón Muñoz | Spain |
| silver medal | Neža Klančar | Slovenia |
| bronze medal | Kalia Antoniou | Cyprus |

The women's 50 metre freestyle competition at the 2022 Mediterranean Games was held on 1 July 2022 at the Aquatic Center of the Olympic Complex in Bir El Djir.

== Records ==
Prior to this competition, the existing world and Mediterranean Games records were as follows:

| World record | Sarah Sjöström (SWE) | 23.67 | Budapest, Hungary | 29 July 2017 |
| Mediterranean Games record | Farida Osman (EGY) | 24.83 | Tarragona, Spain | 25 June 2018 |

== Results ==
=== Heats ===
The heats were started at 10:00.

| Rank | Heat | Lane | Name | Nationality | Time | Notes |
|---|---|---|---|---|---|---|
| 1 | 3 | 4 | Lidón Muñoz | Spain | 25.19 | Q |
| 2 | 2 | 4 | Kalia Antoniou | Cyprus | 25.24 | Q |
| 3 | 1 | 4 | Neža Klančar | Slovenia | 25.25 | Q |
| 4 | 2 | 3 | Viola Scotto di Carlo | Italy | 25.32 | Q |
| 5 | 2 | 5 | Anna Santamans | France | 25.54 | Q |
| 6 | 2 | 6 | Anna Hadjiloizou | Cyprus | 25.63 | Q |
| 7 | 3 | 5 | Nina Stanisavljević | Serbia | 25.67 | Q |
| 8 | 1 | 6 | Sofia Klikopoulou | Greece | 25.77 | Q |
| 9 | 1 | 5 | Amel Melih | Algeria | 25.85 | |
| 10 | 3 | 2 | Lucile Tessariol | France | 26.01 | |
| 11 | 3 | 3 | Carmen Weiler | Spain | 26.02 | |
| 12 | 3 | 6 | Claudia Lutecka | Italy | 26.05 | |
| 13 | 1 | 3 | Maria Drasidou | Greece | 26.06 | |
| 14 | 2 | 7 | Nesrine Medjahed | Algeria | 26.15 | |
| 15 | 1 | 2 | Tjaša Pintar | Slovenia | 26.32 | |
| 16 | 1 | 7 | Ana Guedes | Portugal | 26.55 | |
| 17 | 2 | 2 | İlknur Nihan Çakıcı | Turkey | 26.57 | |
| 18 | 3 | 7 | Sezin Eligül | Turkey | 26.91 | |
| 19 | 3 | 1 | Francisca Martins | Portugal | 27.06 | |
| 20 | 3 | 8 | Mònica Ramírez | Andorra | 27.34 | |
| 21 | 2 | 1 | Nàdia Tudó | Andorra | 27.99 | |
| | 1 | 1 | Tanja Popović | Serbia | Did not start | |

=== Final ===
The final was held at 18:00.

| Rank | Lane | Name | Nationality | Time | Notes |
|---|---|---|---|---|---|
| 1st place, gold medalist(s) | 4 | Lidón Muñoz | Spain | 24.97 | |
| 2nd place, silver medalist(s) | 3 | Neža Klančar | Slovenia | 25.01 | |
| 3rd place, bronze medalist(s) | 5 | Kalia Antoniou | Cyprus | 25.06 | |
| 4 | 2 | Anna Santamans | France | 25.37 | |
| 5 | 6 | Viola Scotto di Carlo | Italy | 25.48 | |
| 6 | 7 | Anna Hadjiloizou | Cyprus | 25.55 | |
| 7 | 1 | Nina Stanisavljević | Serbia | 25.77 | |
| 8 | 8 | Sofia Klikopoulou | Greece | 25.93 | |
