= Swimming at the 2022 Mediterranean Games – Women's 50 metre butterfly =

Women's 50 metre butterfly at the 2022 Mediterranean Games
- Location: Bir El Djir, Algeria
- Dates: 2 July
- Competitors: 17 from 11 nations
- Winning time: 25.95

Medalists
| gold medal | Anna Ntountounaki | Greece |
| silver medal | Viola Scotto di Carlo | Italy |
| bronze medal | Sonia Laquintana | Italy |

The women's 50 metre butterfly competition at the 2022 Mediterranean Games was held on 2 July 2022 at the Aquatic Center of the Olympic Complex in Bir El Djir.

== Records ==
Prior to this competition, the existing world and Mediterranean Games records were as follows:

| World record | Sarah Sjöström (SWE) | 24.43 | Borås, Sweden | 5 July 2014 |
| Mediterranean Games record | Farida Osman (EGY) | 25.48 | Tarragona, Spain | 24 June 2018 |

== Results ==
=== Heats ===
The heats were started at 10:00.

| Rank | Heat | Lane | Name | Nationality | Time | Notes |
|---|---|---|---|---|---|---|
| 1 | 1 | 4 | Viola Scotto di Carlo | Italy | 26.48 | Q |
| 2 | 2 | 4 | Neža Klančar | Slovenia | 26.51 | Q |
| 3 | 3 | 4 | Anna Ntountounaki | Greece | 26.60 | Q |
| 4 | 1 | 5 | Sonia Laquintana | Italy | 26.77 | Q |
| 5 | 2 | 7 | Lana Pudar | Bosnia and Herzegovina | 26.78 | Q |
| 6 | 3 | 5 | Ana Guedes | Portugal | 26.96 | Q |
| 7 | 3 | 3 | Emma Morel | France | 26.99 | Q |
| 8 | 1 | 3 | Mariana Cunha | Portugal | 27.20 | Q |
| 9 | 2 | 5 | Lidón Muñoz | Spain | 27.25 | |
| 10 | 2 | 6 | Nina Stanisavljević | Serbia | 27.44 | |
| 11 | 3 | 6 | Sezin Eligül | Turkey | 27.46 | |
| 12 | 2 | 3 | Georgia Damasioti | Greece | 27.55 | |
| 13 | 1 | 6 | Amel Melih | Algeria | 27.59 | |
| 14 | 1 | 2 | Kalia Antoniou | Cyprus | 27.68 | |
| 15 | 2 | 2 | Carla Hurtado | Spain | 28.21 | |
| 16 | 3 | 7 | Nesrine Medjahed | Algeria | 28.44 | |
| 17 | 3 | 2 | Ecem Dönmez | Turkey | 29.47 | |

=== Final ===
The final was held at 18:00.

| Rank | Lane | Name | Nationality | Time | Notes |
|---|---|---|---|---|---|
| 1st place, gold medalist(s) | 3 | Anna Ntountounaki | Greece | 25.95 | |
| 2nd place, silver medalist(s) | 4 | Viola Scotto di Carlo | Italy | 26.25 | |
| 3rd place, bronze medalist(s) | 6 | Sonia Laquintana | Italy | 26.38 | |
| 4 | 5 | Neža Klančar | Slovenia | 26.45 | |
| 5 | 2 | Lana Pudar | Bosnia and Herzegovina | 26.77 | |
| 6 | 7 | Ana Guedes | Portugal | 26.96 | |
| 7 | 8 | Mariana Cunha | Portugal | 27.09 | |
| 8 | 1 | Emma Morel | France | 27.50 | |
