= Swimming at the 2022 Mediterranean Games – Women's 100 metre backstroke =

Women's 100 metre backstroke at the 2022 Mediterranean Games
- Location: Bir El Djir, Algeria
- Dates: 5 July
- Competitors: 12 from 8 nations
- Winning time: 1:01.34

Medalists
gold medal	Camila Rebelo	Portugal
silver medal	Carlotta Zofkova	Italy
bronze medal	Carmen Weiler	Spain

The women's 100 metre backstroke competition at the 2022 Mediterranean Games was held on 5 July 2022 at the Aquatic Center of the Olympic Complex in Bir El Djir.

== Records ==
Prior to this competition, the existing world and Mediterranean Games records were as follows:

World record	Kaylee McKeown (AUS)	57.45	Adelaide, Australia	13 June 2021
Mediterranean Games record	Margherita Panziera (ITA)	1:00.54	Tarragona, Spain	25 June 2018

== Results ==
=== Heats ===
The heats were started at 11:21.

Rank	Heat	Lane	Name	Nationality	Time	Notes
1	2	4	Ekaterina Avramova	Turkey	1:01.89	Q
2	1	5	Camila Rebelo	Portugal	1:01.92	Q
3	1	3	Carlotta Zofkova	Italy	1:02.19	Q
4	1	4	Carmen Weiler	Spain	1:02.62	Q
5	2	5	África Zamorano	Spain	1:02.64	Q
6	2	6	Anita Gastaldi	Italy	1:03.10	Q
7	2	7	Anna Ntountounaki	Greece	1:03.21	Q
8	2	2	Janja Šegel	Slovenia	1:03.22	Q, WD
9	1	6	Ioanna Sacha	Greece	1:03.46	Q
10	1	2	Anaïs Podevin	France	1:03.84	
11	2	3	Rafaela Azevedo	Portugal	1:04.81	
12	1	7	Imène Kawthar Zitouni	Algeria	1:07.74	

=== Final ===
The final was held at 19:04.

Rank	Lane	Name	Nationality	Time	Notes
1st place, gold medalist(s)	5	Camila Rebelo	Portugal	1:01.34	
2nd place, silver medalist(s)	3	Carlotta Zofkova	Italy	1:01.61	
3rd place, bronze medalist(s)	6	Carmen Weiler	Spain	1:01.98	
4	4	Ekaterina Avramova	Turkey	1:02.03	
5	2	África Zamorano	Spain	1:02.15	
6	7	Anita Gastaldi	Italy	1:02.31	
7	1	Anna Ntountounaki	Greece	1:03.51	
	8	Ioanna Sacha	Greece	Did not start	
