= Archery at the 2022 Mediterranean Games – Mixed team =

Mixed team at the 2022 Mediterranean Games
- Venue: Annex Stadium Olympic Complex
- Date: 29 June – 1 July 2022
- Competitors: 24 from 12 nations
- Teams: 12

Medalists
gold medal	Yasemin Anagöz; Mete Gazoz	Turkey
silver medal	Lucilla Boari; Mauro Nespoli	Italy
bronze medal	Elia Canales; Miguel Alvariño	Spain

The mixed team competition in archery at the 2022 Mediterranean Games was held from 29 June to 1 July 2022 at the Annex Stadium of the Olympic Complex in Oran.

== Qualification round ==
Results after 144 arrows.

Rank	Nation	Name	Score	10+X	X
1	Turkey	Yasemin Anagöz; Mete Gazoz	1319	56	15
2	Italy	Lucilla Boari; Mauro Nespoli	1304	50	15
3	Slovenia	Ana Umer; Den Habjan Malavašič	1300	47	14
4	Spain	Elia Canales; Miguel Alvariño	1295	43	12
5	France	Lauréna Villard; Romain Fichet	1276	36	7
6	Greece	Anatoli Martha Gkorila; Alexandros Karageorgiou	1255	39	12
7	Tunisia	Rihab Elwalid; Mohamed Hammed	1242	32	7
8	Cyprus	Elena Petrou; Charalambos Charalambous	1221	28	7
9	Egypt	Nada Azzam; Aly Abdelbar	1186	26	5
10	Algeria	Yasmine Bellal; Abdelmajid Hocine	1181	25	7
11	Serbia	Anja Brkić; Mihajlo Stefanović	1176	22	12
12	Libya	Maran Baayou; Majdi Aborgiba	884	5	1

== Elimination round ==
1/8 finals
9	Azzam (EGY); Abdelbar (EGY)	0	27	32	32
8	Petrou (CYP); Charalambous (CYP)	6	34	34	33
5	Villard (FRA); Fichet (FRA)	6	34	32	34	38
12	Baayou (LBA); Aborgiba (LBA)	2	17	38	28	20
11	Brkić (SRB); Stefanović (SRB)	2	31	32	34	32
6	Gkorila (GRE); Karageorgiou (GRE)	6	35	33	30	33
7	Elwalid (TUN); Hammed (TUN)	6	35	35	37	34
10	Bellal (ALG); Hocine (ALG)	2	33	36	32	26

Quarterfinals
1	Anagöz (TUR); Gazoz (TUR)	6	35	40	38
8	Petrou (CYP); Charalambous (CYP)	0	33	36	33
5	Villard (FRA); Fichet (FRA)	4	37	37	33	32	17
4	Canales (ESP); Alvariño (ESP)	5	36	35	35	35	17+
3	Čavič (SLO); Ravnikar (SLO)	4	37	35	28	37	17
6	Gkorila (GRE); Karageorgiou (GRE)	5	33	36	36	29	18
7	Elwalid (TUN); Hammed (TUN)	0	26	34	34
2	Boari (ITA); Nespoli (ITA)	6	35	38	35

Semifinals
1	Anagöz (TUR); Gazoz (TUR)	5	36	37	36	32	19
4	Canales (ESP); Alvariño (ESP)	4	36	37	34	36	17
6	Gkorila (GRE); Karageorgiou (GRE)	0	32	34	32
2	Boari (ITA); Nespoli (ITA)	6	37	36	34

Final
1	Anagöz (TUR); Gazoz (TUR)	5	34	34	38	36
2	Boari (ITA); Nespoli (ITA)	3	35	34	34	33
Third place
4	Canales (ESP); Alvariño (ESP)	6	33	39	35	37
6	Gkorila (GRE); Karageorgiou (GRE)	2	37	36	21	31
