= Archery at the 2022 Mediterranean Games – Men's individual =

Men's individual at the 2022 Mediterranean Games
- Venue: Annex Stadium Olympic Complex
- Date: 29 June – 1 July
- Competitors: 36 from 17 nations

Medalists
gold medal	Federico Musolesi	Italy
silver medal	Mete Gazoz	Turkey
bronze medal	Mauro Nespoli	Italy

The men's individual competition in archery at the 2022 Mediterranean Games was held from 29 June to 1 July at the Annex Stadium of the Olympic Complex in Oran.

== Qualification round ==
Results after 72 arrows.

Rank	Name	Nation	Score	10+X	X
1	Mete Gazoz	Turkey	670	30	9
2	Mauro Nespoli	Italy	667	28	10
3	Federico Musolesi	Italy	661	29	5
4	Den Habjan Malavašič	Slovenia	657	27	7
5	Samet Ak	Turkey	654	27	7
6	Miguel Alvariño	Spain	653	24	4
7	Romain Fichet	France	649	21	4
8	Žiga Ravnikar	Slovenia	649	20	3
9	Pablo Acha	Spain	643	20	11
10	Daniel Castro	Spain	642	19	5
11	Alessandro Paoli	Italy	641	18	6
12	Nicolas Bernardi	France	639	18	6
13	Nuno Carneiro	Portugal	633	16	2
14	Alen Remar	Croatia	633	13	3
15	Iban Bariteaud	France	632	21	6
16	Mihajlo Stefanović	Serbia	631	17	10
17	Muhammed Yıldırmış	Turkey	628	21	10
18	Edi Dvorani	Kosovo	622	15	1
19	Aly Abdelbar	Egypt	618	18	2
20	Charalambos Charalambous	Cyprus	617	17	5
21	Constantinos Panagi	Cyprus	617	16	5
22	Valmir Gllareva	Kosovo	614	15	4
23	Mohamed Hammed	Tunisia	614	10	3
24	Alexandros Karageorgiou	Greece	611	15	4
25	Tiago Matos	Portugal	606	17	6
26	Sergej Podkrajšek	Slovenia	601	10	3
27	Abdelmajid Hocine	Algeria	598	14	4
28	Luís Gonçalves	Portugal	596	15	6
29	Imadeddine Bakri	Algeria	596	9	4
30	Bahaaeldin Aly	Egypt	583	13	5
31	Ayoub Rahlaoui	Algeria	580	7	1
32	Jacopo Forlani	San Marino	566	6	3
33	Konstantinos Loizou	Cyprus	532	8	1
34	Hazir Asllani	Kosovo	515	13	3
35	Jacques El Rayes	Lebanon	501	6	2
36	Majdi Aborgiba	Libya	499	2	1

== Elimination round ==
=== Section 1 ===
1/24 finals
33	Loizou (CYP)	6	25	24	19	26
32	Forlani (SMR)	2	23	18	24	20

1/16 finals
1	Gazoz (TUR)	6	30	28	27
33	Loizou (CYP)	0	18	21	26
17	Yıldırmış (TUR)	2	25	24	28	21
16	Stefanović (SRB)	6	26	28	27	25
9	Acha (ESP)	6	24	29	27
24	Karageorgiou (GRE)	0	22	24	24
25	Matos (POR)	1	27	25	24	26
8	Ravnikar (SLO)	7	27	27	28	27

1/8 finals
1	Gazoz (TUR)	6	27	27	30	29
16	Stefanović (SRB)	2	28	25	29	27
9	Acha (ESP)	3	29	27	27	26	26
8	Ravnikar (SLO)	7	28	27	28	28	30

Quarterfinals
1	Gazoz (TUR)	6	30	27	27	29
8	Ravnikar (SLO)	2	29	28	25	28

=== Section 2 ===
1/24 finals
29	Bakri (ALG)	6	28	21	22
36	Aborgiba (LBA)	0	10	15	21

1/16 finals
5	Ak (TUR)	6	27	28	27
28	Gonçalves (POR)	0	19	23	23
21	Panagi (CYP)	0	25	25	27
12	Bernardi (FRA)	6	29	29	28
13	Carneiro (POR)	6	24	27	28
20	Charalambous (CYP)	0	23	24	25
29	Bakri (ALG)	w/o
4	Habjan Malavašič (SLO)

1/8 finals
5	Ak (TUR)	4	24	29	27	29	28
12	Bernardi (FRA)	6	29	29	28	27	28
13	Carneiro (POR)	6	24	24	27	26	29
29	Bakri (ALG)	4	28	27	24	24	26

Quarterfinals
12	Bernardi (FRA)	7	27	27	28	28
13	Carneiro (POR)	1	24	27	26	27

=== Section 3 ===
1/24 finals
35	El Rayes (LBN)	0	23	15	22
30	Aly (EGY)	6	26	20	29

1/16 finals
3	Musolesi (ITA)	7	28	26	28	28
30	Aly (EGY)	1	28	23	26	19
19	Abdelbar (EGY)	3	26	27	26	27	20
14	Remar (CRO)	7	26	26	28	30	27
11	Paoli (ITA)	6	28	29	27	26	25
22	Gllareva (KOS)	4	25	25	30	27	24
27	Hocine (ALG)	0	25	25	26
6	Alvariño (ESP)	6	27	28	29

1/8 finals
3	Musolesi (ITA)	6	27	30	29
14	Remar (CRO)	0	26	25	28
11	Paoli (ITA)	1	26	28	27	28
6	Alvariño (ESP)	7	29	28	29	29

Quarterfinals
3	Musolesi (ITA)	6	29	29	28	29	28
6	Alvariño (ESP)	4	30	28	28	25	28

=== Section 4 ===
1/24 finals
31	Rahlaoui (ALG)	6	21	23	24	25
34	Asllani (KOS)	2	26	18	20	23

1/16 finals
7	Fichet (FRA)	6	27	27	29
26	Podkrajšek (SLO)	0	25	24	28
23	Hammed (TUN)	0	23	28	27
10	Castro (ESP)	6	28	30	28
15	Bariteaud (FRA)	6	27	27	27	26	28
18	Dvorani (KOS)	4	26	26	28	27	24
31	Rahlaoui (ALG)	0	29	23	22
2	Nespoli (ITA)	6	30	29	27

1/8 finals
7	Fichet (FRA)	6	28	25	28	28	27
10	Castro (ESP)	4	29	30	27	27	26
15	Bariteaud (FRA)	3	29	27	29	28	24
2	Nespoli (ITA)	7	27	28	29	29	29

Quarterfinals
7	Fichet (FRA)	1	27	28	28	28
2	Nespoli (ITA)	7	30	29	28	30

=== Finals ===
Semifinals
1	Mete Gazoz (TUR)	6	29	29	30
12	Nicolas Bernardi (FRA)	0	24	27	28
3	Federico Musolesi (ITA)	6	28	28	29	28
2	Mauro Nespoli (ITA)	2	26	27	29	28

Gold medal match
1	Mete Gazoz (TUR)	4	23	29	28	23	25
3	Federico Musolesi (ITA)	6	25	26	27	27	26
Bronze medal match
12	Nicolas Bernardi (FRA)	3	24	21	27	24	24
2	Mauro Nespoli (ITA)	7	24	26	27	24	25
