= Swimming at the 2022 Mediterranean Games – Women's 4 × 100 metre freestyle relay =

Women's 4 × 100 metre freestyle relay at the 2022 Mediterranean Games
- Location: Bir El Djir, Algeria
- Dates: 5 July
- Competitors: 32 from 8 nations
- Teams: 8
- Winning time: 3:38.52

Medalists
gold medal	Janja Šegel; Neža Klančar; Katja Fain; Tjaša Pintar	Slovenia
silver medal	Assia Touati; Lucile Tessariol; Marina Jehl; Océane Carnez	France
bronze medal	Sonia Laquintana; Alice Mizzau; Viola Scotto di Carlo; Sofia Morini	Italy

The women's 4 × 100 metre freestyle relay competition at the 2022 Mediterranean Games was held on 5 July 2022 at the Aquatic Center of the Olympic Complex in Bir El Djir.

== Records ==
Prior to this competition, the existing world and Mediterranean Games records were as follows:

World record	Australia	3:29.69	Tokyo, Japan	25 July 2021
Mediterranean Games record	France	3:39.95	Tarragona, Spain	24 June 2018

The following records were established during the competition:

Date	Event	Nation	Swimmers	Time	Record
5 July	Final	Slovenia	Janja Šegel (54.26); Neža Klančar (54.07); Katja Fain (54.82); Tjaša Pintar (55.37)	3:38.52	GR

== Results ==
The final was held at 19:34.

Rank	Lane	Nation	Swimmers	Time	Notes
1st place, gold medalist(s)	7	Slovenia	Janja Šegel (54.26 NR) GR; Neža Klančar (54.07); Katja Fain (54.82); Tjaša Pintar (55.37)	3:38.52	GR, NR
2nd place, silver medalist(s)	3	France	Assia Touati (56.14); Lucile Tessariol (54.63); Marina Jehl (55.11); Océane Carnez (55.69)	3:41.57	
3rd place, bronze medalist(s)	4	Italy	Sonia Laquintana (56.14); Alice Mizzau (56.04); Viola Scotto di Carlo (55.67); Sofia Morini (55.01)	3:42.86	
4	5	Spain	Ainhoa Campabadal (56.88); Lidón Muñoz (54.79); Carmen Weiler (55.91); África Zamorano (56.42)	3:44.00	
5	6	Turkey	Sezin Eligül (58.18); İlknur Nihan Çakıcı (56.73); Viktoriya Zeynep Güneş (56.87); Ekaterina Avramova (57.61)	3:49.39	
6	2	Greece	Sofia Klikopoulou (57.47); Chrysoula Mitsakou (57.70); Xanthi Mitsakou (58.19); Anna Ntountounaki (57.20)	3:50.56	
7	8	Portugal	Francisca Martins (58.01); Ana Rodrigues (57.55); Mariana Cunha (56.88); Camila Rebelo (58.79)	3:51.23	NR
8	1	Algeria	Amel Melih (56.68); Nesrine Medjahed (57.18); Jihane Benchadli (1:00.25); Lilia Sihem Midouni (59.09)	3:53.20	NR
