= Swimming at the 2022 Mediterranean Games – Women's 400 metre freestyle =

Women's 400 metre freestyle at the 2022 Mediterranean Games
- Location: Bir El Djir, Algeria
- Dates: 5 July
- Competitors: 14 from 9 nations
- Winning time: 4:08.04

Medalists
gold medal	Deniz Ertan	Turkey
silver medal	Katja Fain	Slovenia
bronze medal	Antonietta Cesarano	Italy

The Women's 400 metre freestyle competition at the 2022 Mediterranean Games was held on 5 July 2022 at the Aquatic Center of the Olympic Complex in Bir El Djir.

== Records ==
Prior to this competition, the existing world and Mediterranean Games records were as follows:

World record	Ariarne Titmus (AUS)	3:56.40	Adelaide, Australia	22 May 2022
Mediterranean Games record	Federica Pellegrini (ITA)	4:00.41	Pescara, Italy	27 June 2009

== Results ==
=== Heats ===
The heats were started at 10:10.

Rank	Heat	Lane	Name	Nationality	Time	Notes
1	2	4	Deniz Ertan	Turkey	4:11.39	Q
2	2	3	Martina Caramignoli	Italy	4:14.50	Q
3	2	5	Antonietta Cesarano	Italy	4:14.82	Q
4	1	5	Katja Fain	Slovenia	4:15.08	Q
5	1	4	Beril Böcekler	Turkey	4:15.84	Q
6	1	3	Tamila Holub	Portugal	4:16.57	Q
7	2	2	Francisca Martins	Portugal	4:21.04	Q
8	2	6	Paula Juste	Spain	4:21.09	Q
9	1	7	Chrysoula Mitsakou	Greece	4:22.11	
10	1	2	Daša Tušek	Slovenia	4:22.60	
11	2	7	Camille Tissandié	France	4:25.20	
12	2	1	Xanthi Mitsakou	Greece	4:31.62	
13	1	1	Lilia Sihem Midouni	Algeria	4:43.40	
14	2	8	Sara Dande	Albania	4:47.68	
	1	6	Ainhoa Campabadal	Spain	Did not start	

=== Final ===
The final was held at 18:04.

Rank	Lane	Name	Nationality	Time	Notes
1st place, gold medalist(s)	4	Deniz Ertan	Turkey	4:08.04	
2nd place, silver medalist(s)	6	Katja Fain	Slovenia	4:09.07	
3rd place, bronze medalist(s)	3	Antonietta Cesarano	Italy	4:10.13	
4	5	Martina Caramignoli	Italy	4:12.08	
5	7	Tamila Holub	Portugal	4:14.25	
6	2	Beril Böcekler	Turkey	4:17.92	
7	8	Paula Juste	Spain	4:20.10	
8	1	Francisca Martins	Portugal	4:24.14	
