= Swimming at the 2022 Mediterranean Games – Women's 4 × 200 metre freestyle relay =

Women's 4 × 200 metre freestyle relay at the 2022 Mediterranean Games
- Location: Bir El Djir, Algeria
- Dates: 3 July
- Competitors: 24 from 6 nations
- Teams: 6
- Winning time: 7:59.27

Medalists
gold medal	Janja Šegel; Neža Klančar; Katja Fain; Tjaša Pintar	Slovenia
silver medal	Linda Caponi; Antonietta Cesarano; Noemi Cesarano; Alice Mizzau	Italy
bronze medal	Deniz Ertan; Merve Tuncel; Ecem Dönmez; Beril Böcekler	Turkey

The women's 4 × 200 metre freestyle relay competition at the 2022 Mediterranean Games was held on 3 July 2022 at the Aquatic Center of the Olympic Complex in Bir El Djir.

== Records ==
Prior to this competition, the existing world and Mediterranean Games records were as follows:

World record	China	7:40.33	Tokyo, Japan	29 July 2021
Mediterranean Games record	Italy	7:56.69	Pescara, Italy	30 June 2009

== Results ==
The final was held at 19:28.

Rank	Lane	Nation	Swimmers	Time	Notes
1st place, gold medalist(s)	6	Slovenia	Janja Šegel (1:59.34); Neža Klančar (2:02.07); Katja Fain (1:57.72); Tjaša Pintar (2:00.14)	7:59.27	NR
2nd place, silver medalist(s)	4	Italy	Linda Caponi (2:00.51); Antonietta Cesarano (1:59.16); Noemi Cesarano (2:00.65); Alice Mizzau (1:59.31)	7:59.63	
3rd place, bronze medalist(s)	5	Turkey	Deniz Ertan (2:01.42); Merve Tuncel (2:00.63); Ecem Dönmez (2:01.13); Beril Böcekler (2:02.23)	8:05.41	
4	1	France	Océane Carnez (2:00.78); Lucile Tessariol (1:59.44); Marina Jehl (2:04.10); Assia Touati (2:03.02)	8:07.34	
5	2	Spain	Ainhoa Campabadal (2:02.09); Paula Juste (2:02.52); África Zamorano (2:02.32); Júlia Pujadas (2:03.15)	8:10.08	
6	7	Portugal	Francisca Martins (2:02.09); Tamila Holub (2:02.52); Mariana Cunha (2:02.32); Camila Rebelo (2:03.15)	8:17.52	
