= Swimming at the 2022 Mediterranean Games – Men's 400 metre individual medley =

Men's 400 metre individual medley at the 2022 Mediterranean Games
- Location: Bir El Djir, Algeria
- Dates: 2 July
- Competitors: 10 from 7 nations
- Winning time: 4:13.83

Medalists
gold medal	Pier Andrea Matteazzi	Italy
silver medal	Anže Ferš Eržen	Slovenia
bronze medal	Pietro Paolo Sarpe	Italy

The men's 400 metre individual medley competition at the 2022 Mediterranean Games was held on 2 July 2022 at the Aquatic Center of the Olympic Complex in Bir El Djir.

== Records ==
Prior to this competition, the existing world and Mediterranean Games records were as follows:

World record	Michael Phelps (USA)	4:03.84	Beijing, China	10 August 2008
Mediterranean Games record	Oussama Mellouli (TUN)	4:10.53	Pescara, Italy	29 June 2009

== Results ==
=== Heats ===
The heats were started at 10:59.

Rank	Heat	Lane	Name	Nationality	Time	Notes
1	1	2	Anže Ferš Eržen	Slovenia	4:23.00	Q
2	1	3	Pietro Paolo Sarpe	Italy	4:23.36	Q
3	2	4	Pier Andrea Matteazzi	Italy	4:23.56	Q
4	2	3	Tom Rémy	France	4:24.40	Q
5	1	4	Alex Castejón	Spain	4:25.74	Q
6	1	6	Ramzi Chouchar	Algeria	4:27.52	Q
7	2	2	Thomas Le Pape	France	4:27.93	Q
8	2	6	Kaan Korkmaz	Turkey	4:29.23	Q
9	2	7	Polat Uzer Turnalı	Turkey	4:29.29	
10	1	5	Daniil Giourtzidis	Greece	4:29.58	
	2	5	Jaouad Syoud	Algeria	Did not start	

=== Final ===
The final was held at 18:59.

Rank	Lane	Name	Nationality	Time	Notes
1st place, gold medalist(s)	3	Pier Andrea Matteazzi	Italy	4:13.83	
2nd place, silver medalist(s)	4	Anže Ferš Eržen	Slovenia	4:19.63	NR
3rd place, bronze medalist(s)	5	Pietro Paolo Sarpe	Italy	4:20.41	
4	6	Tom Rémy	France	4:21.42	
5	2	Alex Castejón	Spain	4:22.39	
6	1	Thomas Le Pape	France	4:26.34	
7	7	Ramzi Chouchar	Algeria	4:27.93	
8	8	Kaan Korkmaz	Turkey	4:29.09	
