= Swimming at the 2022 Mediterranean Games – Men's 50 metre breaststroke =

Men's 50 metre breaststroke at the 2022 Mediterranean Games
- Location: Bir El Djir, Algeria
- Dates: 2 July
- Competitors: 17 from 10 nations
- Winning time: 26.97

Medalists
gold medal	Fabio Scozzoli	Italy
silver medal	Emre Sakçı	Turkey
bronze medal	Peter John Stevens	Slovenia

The men's 50 metre breaststroke competition at the 2022 Mediterranean Games was held on 2 July 2022 at the Aquatic Center of the Olympic Complex in Bir El Djir.

== Records ==
Prior to this competition, the existing world and Mediterranean Games records were as follows:

World record	Adam Peaty (GBR)	25.95	Budapest, Hungary	25 July 2017
Mediterranean Games record	Alessandro Terrin (ITA)	27.22	Pescara, Italy	1 July 2009

The following records were established during the competition:

Date	Event	Name	Nationality	Time	Record
2 July	Heats	Fabio Scozzoli	Italy	27.17	GR
2 July	Final	Fabio Scozzoli	Italy	26.97	GR

== Results ==
=== Heats ===
The heats were started at 10:10.

Rank	Heat	Lane	Name	Nationality	Time	Notes
1	2	4	Fabio Scozzoli	Italy	27.17	Q, GR
2	3	4	Emre Sakçı	Turkey	27.46	Q
3	1	5	Konstantinos Meretsolias	Greece	27.65	Q
4	1	4	Peter John Stevens	Slovenia	27.70	Q
5	3	5	Berkay Ömer Öğretir	Turkey	27.80	Q
6	2	5	Alessandro Pinzuti	Italy	27.82	Q
7	3	3	Melvin Maillot	France	28.12	Q
8	2	3	Julien Valour	France	28.50	Q
9	1	6	Alexis Santos	Portugal	28.65	
10	2	6	Savvas Thomoglou	Greece	28.68	
11	2	7	Patrick Pelegrina	Andorra	28.85	
12	2	2	Moncef Aymen Balamane	Algeria	28.90	
13	3	2	Francisco Quintas	Portugal	28.91	
14	1	3	Panayiotis Panaretos	Cyprus	29.01	
15	3	6	Markos Iakovidis	Cyprus	29.03	
16	3	7	Giacomo Casadei	San Marino	29.49	
17	1	2	Youcef Bouzouia	Algeria	30.48	

=== Final ===
The final was held at 18:04.

Rank	Lane	Name	Nationality	Time	Notes
1st place, gold medalist(s)	4	Fabio Scozzoli	Italy	26.97	GR
2nd place, silver medalist(s)	5	Emre Sakçı	Turkey	27.00	
3rd place, bronze medalist(s)	6	Peter John Stevens	Slovenia	27.46	
4	7	Alessandro Pinzuti	Italy	27.55	
5	3	Konstantinos Meretsolias	Greece	27.93	
6	2	Berkay Ömer Öğretir	Turkey	28.00	
7	8	Julien Valour	France	28.28	
8	1	Melvin Maillot	France	28.33	
