= Swimming at the 2022 Mediterranean Games – Men's 200 metre individual medley =

Men's 200 metre individual medley at the 2022 Mediterranean Games
- Location: Bir El Djir, Algeria
- Dates: 3 July
- Competitors: 14 from 9 nations
- Winning time: 1:58.83

Medalists
gold medal	Jaouad Syoud	Algeria
gold medal	Andreas Vazaios	Greece
bronze medal	Pier Andrea Matteazzi	Italy

The men's 200 metre individual medley competition at the 2022 Mediterranean Games was held on 3 July 2022 at the Aquatic Center of the Olympic Complex in Bir El Djir.

== Records ==
Prior to this competition, the existing world and Mediterranean Games records were as follows:

World record	Ryan Lochte (USA)	1:54.00	Shanghai, China	28 July 2011
Mediterranean Games record	Oussama Mellouli (TUN)	1:58.38	Pescara, Italy	27 June 2009

== Results ==
=== Heats ===
The heats were started at 11:29.

Rank	Heat	Lane	Name	Nationality	Time	Notes
1	2	4	Jaouad Syoud	Algeria	2:00.41	Q
2	2	5	Gabriel Lopes	Portugal	2:00.86	Q
3	1	4	Andreas Vazaios	Greece	2:01.97	Q
4	2	6	Clément Bidard	France	2:02.56	Q
5	2	3	Berke Saka	Turkey	2:02.77	Q
6	1	3	Pier Andrea Matteazzi	Italy	2:02.80	Q
7	2	7	Giovanni Sorriso	Italy	2:03.46	Q
8	1	6	Mario Šurković	Croatia	2:04.38	Q
9	2	2	Anže Ferš Eržen	Slovenia	2:04.54	
10	1	7	Alex Castejón	Spain	2:04.71	
11	2	8	Daniil Giourtzidis	Greece	2:05.33	
12	1	2	Tom Rémy	France	2:05.88	
13	1	1	Ramzi Chouchar	Algeria	2:07.10	
14	2	1	Kaan Korkmaz	Turkey	2:08.56	
	1	5	Alexis Santos	Portugal	Did not start	

=== Final ===
The final was held at 18:43.

Rank	Lane	Name	Nationality	Time	Notes
1st place, gold medalist(s)	4	Jaouad Syoud	Algeria	1:58.83	
1st place, gold medalist(s)	3	Andreas Vazaios	Greece	1:58.83	
3rd place, bronze medalist(s)	7	Pier Andrea Matteazzi	Italy	2:00.24	
4	5	Gabriel Lopes	Portugal	2:00.28	
5	6	Clément Bidard	France	2:01.78	
6	2	Berke Saka	Turkey	2:02.12	
7	1	Giovanni Sorriso	Italy	2:03.33	
8	8	Mario Šurković	Croatia	2:04.10	
