= Federico Musolesi =

Italian archer (born 1998)

Personal information
- National team: Italy
- Born: 17 October 1998 (age 27) Bologna, Italy

Sport
- Sport: Archery
- Club: Aeronautica
Medal record
Men's archery
Representing Italy
International competitions
Event	1st	2nd	3rd
European Championships	1	1	0
European Games	1	0	0
Mediterranean Games	1	0	0
Total	3	1	0
European Games
Gold medal – first place	2023 Kraków-Małopolska	Team
European Championships
Gold medal – first place	2022 Munich	Team
Silver medal – second place	2024 Essen	Team
European Indoor Championships
Silver medal – second place	2024 Varaždin	Team
Silver medal – second place	2026 Plovdiv	Team
Bronze medal – third place	2022 Laško	Team
Bronze medal – third place	2026 Plovdiv	Individual
Mediterranean Games
Gold medal – first place	2022 Oran	Individual

Federico Musolesi (born 17 October 1998) is an Italian archer who competed at the 2024 Summer Olympics.

== Career ==
He won three medals with the team at international senior level.

== Achievements ==
Year	Competition	Venue	Rank	Event	Performance	Notes
2022	European Championships	(Germany) Munich	1st	Team	5–1 at Spain	
2022	Mediterranean Games	(Algeria) Oran	1st	Individual	6–4 at Gazos (TUR)	
2023	European Games	(Poland) Kraków	1st	Team	5–1 at Spain	
2024	European Championships	(Germany) Essen	2nd	Team	0–6 with France	
