= Rihab Elwalid =

Tunisian archer (born 1998)

Personal information
- Nationality: Tunisian
- Born: 14 June 1998 (age 28)

Sport
- Sport: Archery
Medal record
Women's recurve archery
Representing Tunisia
African Games
Silver medal – second place	2019 Rabat	Individual

Rihab Elwalid (born 14 June 1998) is a Tunisian archer. She won the silver medal in the women's recurve event at the 2019 African Games held in Rabat, Morocco. She competed in the women's individual event at the 2020 Summer Olympics held in Tokyo, Japan.

She competed in the women's individual and mixed team events at the 2022 Mediterranean Games held in Oran, Algeria.
