= Laura Veres =

Hungarian swimmer (born 2005)

Personal information
- National team: Hungary
- Born: 21 August 2005 (age 20) Gyula, Hungary

Sport
- Sport: Swimming
Medal record
Representing Hungary
European Championships (LC)
Bronze medal – third place	2020 Budapest	4×200 m freestyle
European Junior Championships
Gold medal – first place	2021 Rome	4×200 m freestyle

Laura Veres (born 21 August 2005) is a Hungarian swimmer. She competed in the women's 4 × 200 metre freestyle relay at the 2020 Summer Olympics.
