= List of Slovenian records in swimming =

The Slovenian records in swimming are the fastest ever performances of swimmers from Slovenia, which are recognised and ratified by Plavalna Zveza Slovenije.

All records were set in finals unless noted otherwise.

== Long Course (50 m) ==
=== Men ===
Event	Time		Name	Club	Date	Meet	Location	Ref
50 m freestyle	22.19		Jernej Godec	Slovenia	11 August 2009	World Military Swimming / Lifesaving Championships	Montreal, Canada	
100 m freestyle	48.88	sf	Anže Tavčar	Slovenia	19 May 2016	European Championships	London, Great Britain	
200 m freestyle	1:47.62		Sašo Boškan	Plavalni klub Triglav Kranj	30 November 2023	Rotterdam Qualification Meet	Rotterdam, Netherlands	
400 m freestyle	3:49.26		Sašo Boškan	Slovenia	27 June 2025	European U23 Championships	Šamorín, Slovakia	
800 m freestyle	7:54.58	h	Luka Turk	Slovenia	27 March 2007	World Championships	Melbourne, Australia	
1500 m freestyle	15:07.59	h	Luka Turk	Slovenia	31 March 2007	World Championships	Melbourne, Australia	
50m backstroke	25.80		Sašo Boškan	Slovenia	10 April 2021	Eindhoven Qualification Meet	Eindhoven, Netherlands	
100m backstroke	54.88	sf	Blaž Medvešek	Slovenia	25 July 2005	World Championships	Montreal, Canada	
200m backstroke	1:58.61	sf, so	Blaž Medvešek	Slovenia	24 July 2003	World Championships	Barcelona, Spain	
50m breaststroke	26.70	h	Damir Dugonjič	Slovenia	4 August 2015	World Championships	Kazan, Russia	
100m breaststroke	59.66	sf	Damir Dugonjič	Slovenia	26 July 2009	World Championships	Rome, Italy	
200m breaststroke	2:15.06	h	Jaš Berložnik	Slovenia	27 June 2025	European U23 Championships	Šamorín, Slovakia	
50m butterfly	23.20	h	Jernej Godec	Slovenia	26 July 2009	World Championships	Rome, Italy	
100m butterfly	51.24	h	Peter Mankoč	Slovenia	14 August 2008	Olympic Games	Beijing, China	
200m butterfly	1:57.05	h	Robert Žbogar	Slovenia	8 August 2016	Olympic Games	Rio de Janeiro, Brazil	
200m individual medley	2:01.08		Anže Ferš Eržen	PK Ilirija Ljubljana	31 July 2023	Slovenian Championships	Kranj, Slovenia	
400m individual medley	4:19.63		Anže Ferš Eržen	Slovenia	2 July 2022	Mediterranean Games	Oran, Algeria	
4×100m freestyle relay	3:20.98	h	Peter Mankoč (49.22); Jernej Godec (50.14); Jernej Mencinger (51.32); Blaž Medvešek (50.30)	Slovenia	24 July 2005	World Championships	Montreal, Canada	
4×200m freestyle relay	7:24.59	h	Anže Tavčar (1:50.36); Martin Bau (1:50.96); Robert Žbogar (1:51.25); Grega Popović (1:52.02)	Slovenia	21 May 2016	European Championships	London, Great Britain	
4×100m medley relay	3:36.79	h	Robert Žbogar (56.41); Damir Dugonjič (1:00.17); Peter Mankoč (50.86); Jernej Godec (49.35)	Slovenia	2 August 2009	World Championships	Rome, Italy	

Legend: # – Record awaiting ratification by Plavalna Zveza Slovenije; WR – World record; ER – European record;
Records not set in finals: h – heat; sf – semifinal; r – relay 1st leg; rh – relay heat 1st leg; b – B final; † – en route to final mark; so – swim-off; tt – time trial

=== Women ===
Event	Time		Name	Club	Date	Meet	Location	Ref
50m freestyle	24.35		Neža Klančar	Slovenia	4 August 2024 (Note: by official result source; 3 August 2024 by national federation source, a typo)	Olympic Games	Paris, France	
100m freestyle	53.96	=	Neža Klančar	Slovenia	17 April 2024	Australian Championships	Gold Coast, Australia	
100m freestyle	53.96	sf, =	Neža Klančar	Slovenia	30 July 2024 (Note: by official result source; 3 August 2024 by national federation source, a typo)	Olympic Games	Paris, France	
200m freestyle	1:54.97		Sara Isaković	Slovenia	13 August 2008	Olympic Games	Beijing, China	
400m freestyle	4:06.35		Anja Klinar	Slovenia	3 July 2016	Open de France de Natation	Vichy, France	
800m freestyle	8:25.68	=	Tjaša Oder	Slovenia	19 May 2016	European Championships	London, Great Britain	
800m freestyle	8:25.68	=	Anja Klinar	Slovenia	2 July 2016	Open de France de Natation	Vichy, France	
1500m freestyle	16:08.67		Tjaša Oder	Slovenia	21 May 2016	European Championships	London, Great Britain	
50m backstroke	28.63		Najya Hana Jukić	Plavalni klub Velenje	22 December 2024	Slovenian Championships	Maribor, Slovenia	
100m backstroke	1:01.85		Anja Čarman	PK Triglav Kranj	20 December 2008	International Meeting	Maribor, Slovenia	
200m backstroke	2:10.49	h	Anja Čarman	Slovenia	14 August 2008	Olympic Games	Beijing, China	
50m breaststroke	31.12	tt	Tara Vovk	Unattached	3 March 2022	TYR Pro Swim Series	Westmont, United States	
100m breaststroke	1:07.54		Tina Celik	Slovenia	11 August 2026	European Championships	Paris, France	
200m breaststroke	2:26.06	h	Tjaša Vozel	Slovenia	4 October 2019	World Cup	Budapest, Hungary	
50m butterfly	25.81	h	Neža Klančar	Slovenia	28 July 2023	World Championships	Fukuoka, Japan	
100m butterfly	58.68	h	Sara Isaković	Slovenia	9 August 2008	Olympic Games	Beijing, China	
200m butterfly	2:07.05		Sara Isaković	Slovenia	6 June 2008	Trofeo Sette Colli	Rome, Italy	
200m individual medley	2:13.37		Anja Klinar	Zito Gorenjka Radovljica	26 April 2009	International Austria-Meet	Vienna, Austria	
400m individual medley	4:38.13		Anja Klinar	Slovenia	9 August 2010	European Championships	Budapest, Hungary	
4×50m freestyle relay	1:49.27		Nastja Govejšek (26.96); Tjaša Pintar (27.40); Gaja Natlačen (27.36); Iza Senčar (27.55)	Plavalna Zveza Slovenije	14 May 2011	Pokal Terme Ptuj	Ptuj, Slovenia	
4×100m freestyle relay	3:38.52		Janja Šegel (54.26); Neža Klančar (54.07); Katja Fain (54.82); Tjaša Pintar (55.37)	Slovenia	5 July 2022	Mediterranean Games	Oran, Algeria	
4×200m freestyle relay	7:59.27		Janja Šegel (1:59.34); Neža Klančar (2:02.07); Katja Fain (1:57.72); Tjaša Pintar (2:00.14)	Slovenia	3 July 2022	Mediterranean Games	Oran, Algeria	
4×100m medley relay	4:07.47	h	Janja Šegel (1:02.02); Tara Vovk (1:10.49); Hana Sekuti (1:00.40); Neža Klančar (54.56)	Slovenia	16 February 2024	World Championships	Doha, Qatar	

Legend: # – Record awaiting ratification by Plavalna Zveza Slovenije; WR – World record; ER – European record;
Records not set in finals: h – heat; sf – semifinal; r – relay 1st leg; rh – relay heat 1st leg; b – B final; † – en route to final mark; so – swim-off; tt – time trial

=== Mixed relay ===
Event	Time		Name	Club	Date	Meet	Location	Ref
4×100m freestyle relay	3:38.17	h	Žan Pogačar (52.95); Grega Popović (53.22); Nastja Govejšek (55.54); Tjaša Pintar (56.46)	Slovenia	17 August 2014	Youth Olympic Games	Nanjing, China	
4×200m freestyle relay	7:37.63		Sašo Boškan (1:48.23); Primož Šenica Pavletič (1:51.71); Janja Segel (1:56.90); Katja Fain (2:00.79)	Slovenia	22 June 2024	European Championships	Belgrade, Serbia	
4×100m medley relay	3:58.52		Ava Schollmayer (1:05.26); Damir Dugonjič (1:01.71); Robert Žbogar (54.15); Anemari Kosak (57.40)	Slovenia	6 March 2016	Cetveroboj SLO-CRO-BIH-SRB	Kranj, Slovenia	
4×100m medley relay	3:54.59	#	Primož Senica Pavletic (56.27); Tina Celik (1:08.31); Jaka Pusnik (55.15); Janja Šegel (54.86)	Slovenia	23 August 2026	Mediterranean Games	Taranto, Italy	

Legend: # – Record awaiting ratification by Plavalna Zveza Slovenije; WR – World record; ER – European record;
Records not set in finals: h – heat; so – swim-off

== Short Course (25 m) ==
=== Men ===
Event	Time		Name	Club	Date	Meet	Location	Ref
50m freestyle	21.18	h	Jernej Godec	Slovenia	10 December 2009	European Championships	Istanbul, Turkey	
100m freestyle	47.82	h	Peter Mankoč	PK Ilirija Ljubljana	28 November 2009	-	Vienna, Austria	
200m freestyle	1:44.12	h	Sašo Boškan	Slovenia	15 December 2024	World Championships	Budapest, Hungary	
400m freestyle	3:41.98	h	Martin Bau	Slovenia	4 December 2019	European Championships	Glasgow, Great Britain	
800m freestyle	7:42.02	h	Sašo Boškan	Slovenia	5 December 2025	European Championships	Lublin, Poland	
1500m freestyle	14:45.10	h	Martin Bau	Slovenia	3 December 2015	European Championships	Netanya, Israel	
50m backstroke	23.53	h	Jernej Godec	Slovenia	11 December 2009	European Championships	Istanbul, Turkey	
100m backstroke	52.26	h	Robert Žbogar	Slovenia	3 December 2015	European Championships	Netanya, Israel	
200m backstroke	1:52.39		Blaž Medvešek	Slovenia	9 December 2004	European Championships	Vienna, Austria	
50m breaststroke	25.85		Peter John Stevens	Slovenia	11 December 2016	World Championships	Windsor, Canada	
100m breaststroke	57.06		Damir Dugonjič	Slovenia	4 December 2014	World Championships	Doha, Qatar	
200m breaststroke	2:07.04	h	Nejc Zupan	Slovenia	25 November 2012	European Championships	Chartres, France	
50m butterfly	22.47	h	Jernej Godec	Slovenia	10 December 2009	European Championships	Istanbul, Turkey	
100m butterfly	49.62	sf	Peter Mankoč	Slovenia	10 December 2009	European Championships	Istanbul, Turkey	
200m butterfly	1:53.85	h	Robert Žbogar	Slovenia	10 December 2011	European Championships	Szczecin, Poland	
100m individual medley	50.76	sf	Peter Mankoč	Slovenia	12 December 2009	European Championships	Istanbul, Turkey	
200m individual medley	1:56.13		Peter Mankoč	Slovenia	5 April 2002	World Championships	Moscow, Russia	
400m individual medley	4:09.38	h	Robert Žbogar	Slovenia	4 December 2014	World Championships	Doha, Qatar	
4×50m freestyle relay	1:28.38		Peter Mankoč (21.88); Matjaž Markič (22.15); Emil Tahirovič (22.37); Blaž Medvešek (21.98)	Slovenia	12 December 2002	European Championships	Riesa, Germany	
4×100m freestyle relay	3:20.92		Jernej Godec; Blaž Medvešek; Luka Velikonja; Peter Mankoč	PK Ilirija Ljubljana	5 February 2004	Slovenian Championships	Celje, Slovenia	
4×200m freestyle relay	7:17.78		Arne Furlan Štular (1:48.28); Primož Šenica Pavletič (1:47.15); Leonardo Korent De Franceschi (1:49.85); Maks Kastigar (1:52.50)	PK Ljubljana	15 December 2023	Slovenian Championships	Koper, Slovenia	
4×50m medley relay	1:33.65	h	Robert Žbogar (24.96); Matjaž Markič (25.76); Peter Mankoč (22.02); Jernej Godec (20.91)	Slovenia	10 December 2009	European Championships	Istanbul, Turkey	
4×100m medley relay	3:37.94		Blaž Medvešek; Matjaž Pernat; Jernej Mencinger; Luka Vrtovec	PK Branik Maribor	6 February 2005	Slovenian Championships	Celje, Slovenia	

Legend: # – Record awaiting ratification by Plavalna Zveza Slovenije; WR – World record; ER – European record;
Records not set in finals: h – heat; sf – semifinal; r – relay 1st leg; rh – relay heat 1st leg; b – B final; † – en route to final mark; so – swim-off; tt – time trial

=== Women ===
Event	Time		Name	Club	Date	Meet	Location	Ref
50 m freestyle	23.88		Neža Klančar	Plavalni klub Olimpija	30 January 2026	Slovenian Championships	Ljubljana, Slovenia	
100 m freestyle	52.78		Neža Klančar	Plavalni klub Olimpija	31 January 2026	Slovenian Championships	Ljubljana, Slovenia	
200 m freestyle	1:53.48		Katja Fain	Slovenia	16 December 2021	World Championships	Abu Dhabi, United Arab Emirates	
400 m freestyle	4:01.46		Katja Fain	Slovenia	13 December 2022	World Championships	Melbourne, Australia	
800 m freestyle	8:13.78		Tjaša Oder	Slovenia	5 December 2019	European Championships	Glasgow, Great Britain	
1500 m freestyle	15:52.61		Tjaša Oder	PK Fužinar Ravne	26 January 2020	Slovenian Championships	Ljubljana, Slovenia	
50m backstroke	27.16	=	Neža Klančar	Olimpija PK Ljubljana	19 November 2023	Špelin in Vesnin Memorial	Kranj, Slovenia	
50m backstroke	27.16	r, =	Janja Šegel	Slovenia	7 December 2023	European Championships	Otopeni, Romania	
100m backstroke	58.16		Anja Čarman	Slovenia	12 December 2008	European Championships	Rijeka, Croatia	
200m backstroke	2:04.04		Anja Čarman	Slovenia	13 December 2009	European Championships	Istanbul, Turkey	
50m breaststroke	30.17	sf	Tara Vovk	Slovenia	6 December 2025	European Championships	Lublin, Poland	
100m breaststroke	1:05.69	h	Tjaša Vozel	Slovenia	6 December 2019	European Championships	Glasgow, Great Britain	
200m breaststroke	2:20.99	h	Tjaša Vozel	Slovenia	8 December 2019	European Championships	Glasgow, Great Britain	
50m butterfly	25.01	sf, so	Neža Klančar	Slovenia	2 December 2025	European Championships	Lublin, Poland	
100m butterfly	58.00	sf	Nastja Govejšek	Slovenia	5 December 2015	European Championships	Netanya, Israel	
200m butterfly	2:07.04		Katja Fain	Slovenia	1 October 2021	World Cup	Berlin, Germany	
100m individual medley	58.55		Neža Klančar	Slovenia	7 December 2023	European Championships	Otopeni, Romania	
200m individual medley	2:09.32		Alenka Kejžar	Slovenia	11 December 2003	European Championships	Dublin, Ireland	
400m individual medley	4:30.83		Anja Klinar	Slovenia	28 November 2010	European Championships	Eindhoven, Netherlands	
4×50m freestyle relay	1:38.96		Neža Klančar (24.62); Katja Fain (24.82); Janja Šegel (25.05); Tjaša Pintar (24.47)	Slovenia	6 December 2019	European Championships	Glasgow, Great Britain	
4×100m freestyle relay	3:46.10		Neža Klančar (53.96); Neža Kocijan (55.92); Anja Jelesijevič (58.16); Manuela Maksi Matkovič (58.06)	PK Olimpija Ljubljana	25 January 2018	Slovenian Championships	Ljubljana, Slovenia	
4×200m freestyle relay	8:05.40		Sara Račnik (2:02.02); Daša Tušek (2:03.19); Tjaša Oder (2:01.60); Janja Šegel (1:58.59)	PK Fužinar Ravne	25 January 2020	Slovenian Championships	Ljubljana, Slovenia	
4×50m medley relay	1:47.09		Janja Šegel (27.17); Tara Vovk (29.76); Neža Klančar (25.14); Katja Fain (25.02)	Slovenia	7 December 2023	European Championships	Otopeni, Romania	
4×100m medley relay	4:10.77		Anja Jelesijevič (1:03.40); Sara Mihalič (1:10.12); Naja Martinčič (1:03.23); Neža Klančar (54.02)	PK Olimpija Ljubljana	26 January 2020	Slovenian Championships	Ljubljana, Slovenia	

Legend: # – Record awaiting ratification by Plavalna Zveza Slovenije; WR – World record; ER – European record;
Records not set in finals: h – heat; sf – semifinal; r – relay 1st leg; rh – relay heat 1st leg; b – B final; † – en route to final mark; so – swim-off; tt – time trial

=== Mixed relay ===
Event	Time		Name	Club	Date	Meet	Location	Ref
4×50 m freestyle relay	1:36.34			Olimpija Ljubljana	28 January 2018	-	Ljubljana, Slovenia	
4×50 m medley relay	1:39.79	not ratified	Anja Čarman (27.19); Damir Dugonjič (25.57); Peter Mankoč (22.20); Nastja Govejšek (24.83)	Slovenia	23 November 2012	European Championships	Chartres, France	

Legend: # – Record awaiting ratification by Plavalna Zveza Slovenije;
Records not set in finals: h – heat; so – swim-off
