= Alice Mizzau =

Italian swimmer (born 1993)

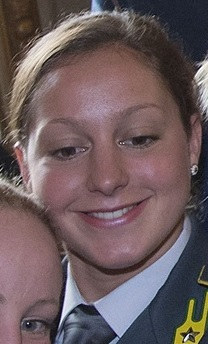

Personal information
- Full name: Alice Mizzau
- National team: Italy
- Born: 18 March 1993 (age 33) Udine, Italy
- Height: 179 cm (5 ft 10 in)
- Weight: 65 kg (143 lb)

Sport
- Sport: Swimming
- Strokes: Freestyle
- Club: G.S. Fiamme Gialle, Plain Team Veneto
- Coach: Max Di Mito
Medal record
Women's swimming
Representing Italy
World Championships (LC)
Silver medal – second place	2015 Kazan	4×200 m freestyle
World Championships (SC)
Bronze medal – third place	2014 Doha	4×100 m freestyle
European Championships (LC)
Gold medal – first place	2012 Debrecen	4×200 m freestyle
Gold medal – first place	2014 Berlin	4×200 m freestyle
Silver medal – second place	2012 Debrecen	4×100 m medley
Bronze medal – third place	2012 Debrecen	4×100 m freestyle
Bronze medal – third place	2014 Berlin	4×100 m freestyle
Bronze medal – third place	2022 Rome	4×200 m mixed freestyle
Mediterranean Games
Silver medal – second place	2022 Oran	4×200 m freestyle
Bronze medal – third place	2022 Oran	200 m freestyle
Bronze medal – third place	2022 Oran	4×100 m freestyle

Alice Mizzau (born 18 March 1993) is an Italian former competitive swimmer who competes primarily in freestyle events.

She won the first gold medal of all time, of an Italian women relay team, at an international swimming championships 2012 European Aquatics Championships with the 4 × 200 m freestyle.

== Biography ==
Alice Mizzau qualified for her first Olympic appearance at the 2012 Summer Olympics in London.

== Achievements ==
Year	Competition	Venue	Position	Event	Performance	Notes
2012	European Championships (LC)	(Hungary) Debrecen	4th	100 m freestyle	55"07	
2012	European Championships (LC)	(Hungary) Debrecen	1st	4 × 200 m freestyle	7'52"90	
2012	European Championships (LC)	(Hungary) Debrecen	3rd	4 × 100 m freestyle	3'39"84	

== See also ==
- Italy at the 2012 Summer Olympics - Swimming
