= Katja Fain =

Slovenian swimmer (born 2001)

Personal information
- Nationality: Slovenian
- Born: 31 August 2001 (age 25) Maribor, Slovenia
- Height: 184 cm (6 ft 0 in)

Sport
- Sport: Swimming
- Club: Plavalni klub Branik Maribor
Medal record
Representing Slovenia
European Championships (SC)
Bronze medal – third place	2021 Kazan	200 m freestyle
Mediterranean Games
Gold medal – first place	2022 Oran	4×200 m freestyle
Gold medal – first place	2022 Oran	4×100 m freestyle
Silver medal – second place	2022 Oran	200 m freestyle
Silver medal – second place	2022 Oran	400 m freestyle
European Junior Championships
Bronze medal – third place	2017 Netanya	400 m freestyle

Katja Fain (born 31 August 2001) is a Slovenian swimmer. She won a bronze medal in the 200 metre freestyle at the 2021 European Short Course Championships. She represented Slovenia at the 2020 and 2024 Summer Olympics.

== Career ==
Fain is coached by her mother, Metka Sparavec, who is a 1996 Olympian in swimming. She won a bronze medal at the 2017 European Junior Championships in the 400 metre freestyle with a time of 4:11.36.

Fain won four titles at the 2019 Slovenian Championships and qualified to represent Slovenia at the 2019 World Aquatics Championships held in Gwangju, South Korea. She competed in the 200 metre freestyle and 400 metre freestyle events. In the 200 metre event, she did not advance to compete in the semi-finals, and in the 400 metre event, she did not advance to compete in the final. She also competed in the 400 metre individual medley event and finished 20th in the heats.

Fain qualified for the 2020 Summer Olympics in three events. Her best finish was in the 400 metre individual medley, where she finished 15th in the heats. She finished 26th in the 800 metre freestyle and 30th in the 1500 metre freestyle. At the 2021 European Short Course Championships, she won a bronze medal in the 200 metre freestyle behind Marrit Steenbergen and Barbora Seemanová.

Fain competed at the 2022 Mediterranean Games alongside Janja Šegel, Neža Klančar, and Tjaša Pintar, and they won gold medals in both the 4 × 100 metre and 4 x 200 metre freestyle relays. Individually, she won silver medals in both the 200 and 400 metre freestyle events. At the 2022 World Short Course Championships, she finished fifth in the 400 metre freestyle and set a new national record of 4:01.46. She also competed in the 200 metre freestyle and finished tenth in the heats. She was selected by the Slovene Swimming Federation as the best swimmer of 2022.

Fain competed for Slovenia at the 2024 Summer Olympics with the 4 × 100 metre freestyle relay team, and they finished 14th in the heats.
