= Alexandros Karageorgiou =

Greek archer (born 1986)

Sport
- Country: Greece
- Sport: Archery

Alexandros Karageorgiou (born 3 June 1986) is an archer from Greece. He competed at the 2004 Summer Olympics.

Karageorgiou placed 33rd in the men's individual ranking round with a 72-arrow score of 647. He then defeated the 32nd-ranked Tarundeep Rai of India in a minor upset, 147–143, in the first round of elimination.

Karageorgiou was also a member of the 13th-place Greek men's archery team at the 2004 Summer Olympics.
