= Neža Klančar =

Slovenian swimmer (born 2000)

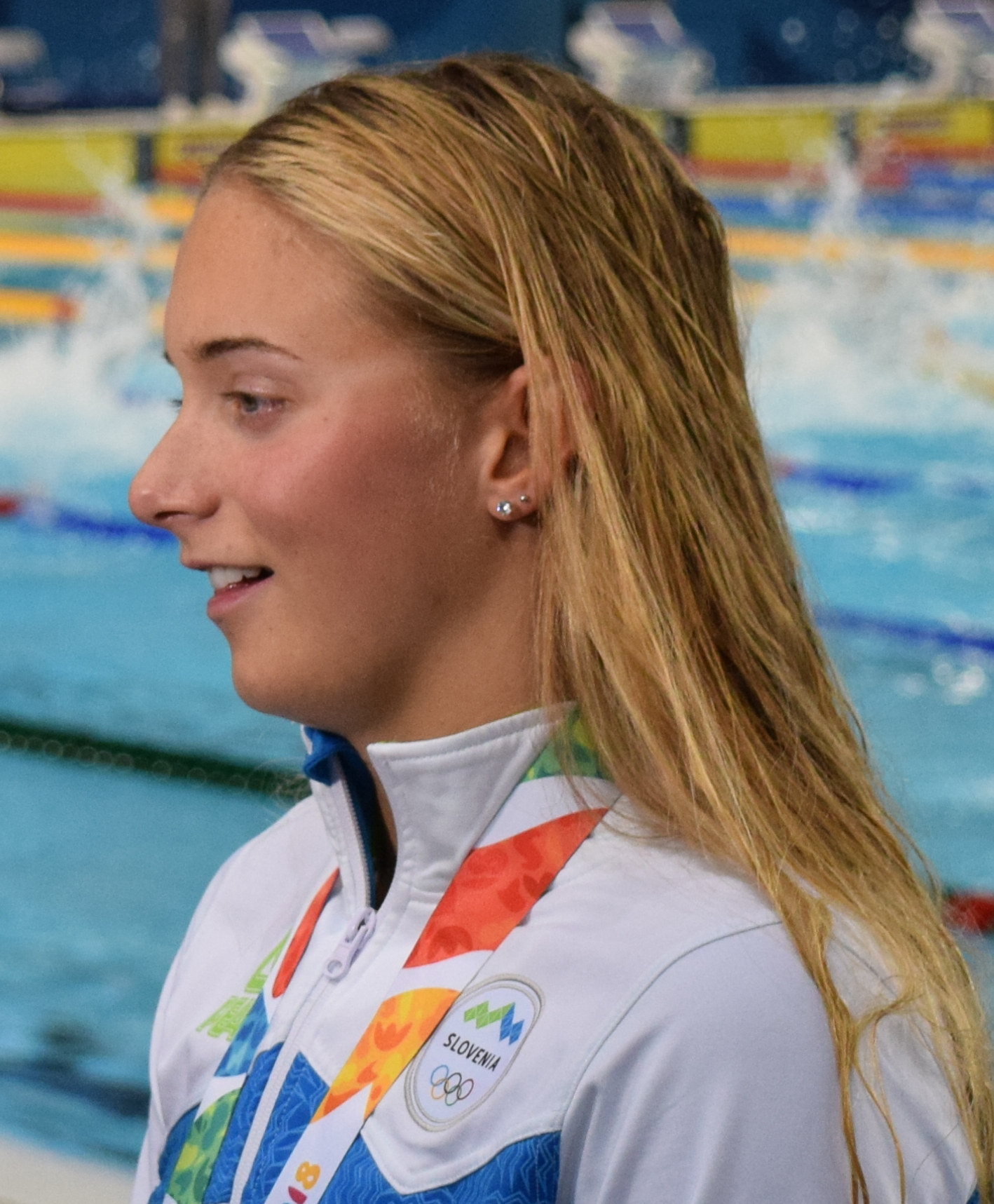
- Klančar at the 2018 Summer Youth Olympics

Personal information
- Nationality: Slovenian
- Born: 19 February 2000 (age 26) Ljubljana, Slovenia
- Height: 171 cm (5 ft 7 in)

Sport
- Sport: Swimming
- Coach: Tomaž Torkar
Medal record
Women's swimming
Representing Slovenia
Mediterranean Games
Gold medal – first place	2022 Oran	4×200 m freestyle
Gold medal – first place	2022 Oran	4×100 m freestyle
Silver medal – second place	2022 Oran	50 m freestyle
Bronze medal – third place	2022 Oran	100 m freestyle
Summer Youth Olympics
Bronze medal – third place	2018 Buenos Aires	50 m freestyle
Bronze medal – third place	2018 Buenos Aires	100 m freestyle

Neža Klančar (born 19 February 2000) is a Slovenian swimmer. At the 2018 Summer Youth Olympics, she won bronze medals in the 50 metre freestyle and the 100 metre freestyle. She won three medals at the 2022 Mediterranean Games and represented Slovenia at the 2024 Summer Olympics where she became Slovenia's first Olympic swimming finalist since 2008.

== Career ==
Klančar competed at the 2018 Summer Youth Olympics in Buenos Aires and finished fifth in the 200 metre individual medley. She tied with China's Yang Junxuan for the bronze medal in the 50 metre freestyle with a time of 25.47. She also won a bronze medal in the 100 metre freestyle and set a new national record of 54.55.

Klančar represented Slovenia at the 2019 World Aquatics Championships held in Gwangju, South Korea. She competed in the 50 metre freestyle and 100 metre freestyle events. In both events she did not advance to compete in the semi-finals. In the 50 mretre freestyle, she broke her own Slovenian national record with a time of 25.12. She also competed in the 200 metre individual medley where she also did not advance to compete in the semi-finals.

Klančar competed at the 2022 Mediterranean Games alongside Janja Šegel, Katja Fain, and Tjaša Pintar, and they won gold medals in both the 4 × 100 metre and 4 x 200 metre freestyle relays. Individually, Klančar won a silver medal in the 50 metre freestyle and a bronze medal in the 100 metre freestyle. She missed the 2024 European Championships due to illness.

Klančar represented Slovenia at the 2024 Summer Olympics. In the 50 metre freestyle, she set a national record in the heats with a time of 24.64 and advanced to the semifinals. She then broke the record again with a time of 24.40 in the semifinals and became the first Slovenian Olympic finalist in swimming since Sara Isakovič in 2008. She once again broke the national record in the final with a time of 24.35 to finish sixth. She also set a national record in the 100 metre freestyle semifinals but did not advance to the final.

Klančar took time off after the Olympics to heal an ongoing shoulder injury. As a result, she withdrew from the 2024 World Short-Course Championships.
