= Beril Böcekler =

Turkish swimmer (born 2004)

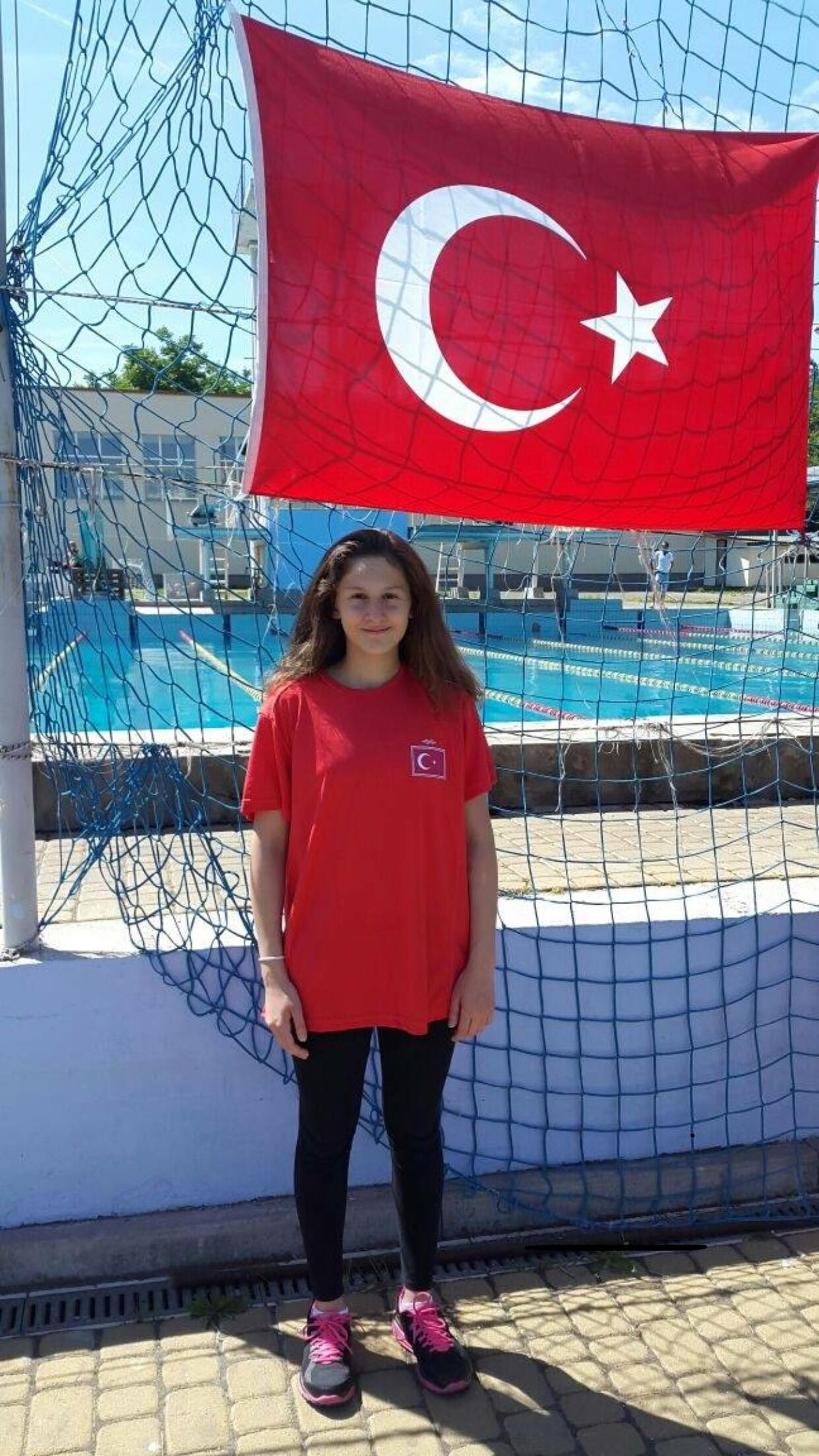
- Beril Böcekler (September 2018)

Personal information
- National team: Turkey
- Born: 7 February 2004 (age 22) Ankara, Turkey

Sport
- Sport: Swimming
- Strokes: Freestyle
- Club: Enka SK
Medal record
Women's swimming
Representing Turkey
Islamic Solidarity Games
Gold medal – first place	2021 Konya	4×200 m freestyle
Silver medal – second place	2021 Konya	200 m freestyle
Silver medal – second place	2021 Konya	400 m freestyle
Mediterranean Games
Bronze medal – third place	2022 Oran	4×200 m freestyle
European Junior Championships
Silver medal – second place	2019 Kazan	800 m freestyle
Silver medal – second place	2019 Kazan	1500 m freestyle
Silver medal – second place	2021 Rome	800 m freestyle
Bronze medal – third place	2021 Rome	200 m freestyle
Bronze medal – third place	2021 Rome	4×200 m freestyle
European Youth Summer Olympic Festival
Gold medal – first place	2019 Baku	200 m freestyle
Gold medal – first place	2019 Baku	400 m freestyle
Gold medal – first place	2019 Baku	800 m freestyle

Beril Böcekler (born 7 February 2004) is a Turkish competitive swimmer in freestyle. She is a member of Enka SK in Istanbul.

Böcekler won the silver medal both in the 800 m freestyle and the 1500 m freestyle event at the 2019 European Junior Swimming Championships in Kazan, Russia. She captured three gold medals in the 200 m freestyle, the 400 m freestyle and the 800 m freestyle event at the 2019 European Youth Summer Olympic Festival (EYOF) in Baku, Azerbaijan, where she set four Turkish national records in the 200 m, 400 m, 800 m and 1500 m freestyle events in addition to the EYOF records in the 400 m and 800 m events. She trains at the Turkish Olympic Preparation Center under the Head Coach Gjon Shyti from 2015
