= Žiga Ravnikar =

Slovenian archer (born 1999)

Personal information
- Nationality: Slovenian
- Born: 25 December 1999 (age 26)
- Home town: Domžale, Slovenia
- Height: 173 cm (5 ft 8 in)

Sport
- Sport: Archery
Medal record
Men's recurve archery
Representing Slovenia
World Field Championships
Gold medal – first place	2024 Lac La Biche	Team
Silver medal – second place	2022 Yankton	Team
Bronze medal – third place	2024 Lac La Biche	Mixed team

Žiga Ravnikar (born 25 December 1999) is a Slovenian archer. He competed in the men's individual event at the 2020 Summer Olympics.
