= Camila Rebelo =

Portuguese swimmer (born 2003)

Personal information
- Full name: Camila Rodrigues Rebelo
- Nationality: Portuguese
- Born: 3 February 2003 (age 23) Vila Nova de Poiares, Coimbra, Portugal

Sport
- Sport: Swimming
- Strokes: back
- Club: Louzan Natação/EFAPEL
Medal record
Women's swimming
Representing Portugal
European Aquatics Championships
Gold medal – first place	2024 Belgrade	200 m backstroke
Silver medal – second place	2026 Paris	200 m backstroke
Mediterranean Games
Gold medal – first place	2022 Oran	100 m backstroke
Gold medal – first place	2022 Oran	200 m backstroke
Gold medal – first place	2026 Taranto	100 m backstroke
Gold medal – first place	2026 Taranto	200 m backstroke
Bronze medal – third place	2026 Taranto	4×100 m mixed medley
World University Games
Silver medal – second place	2021 Chengdu	100 m backstroke
Silver medal – second place	2021 Chengdu	200 m backstroke

Camila Rodrigues Rebelo (born 3 February 2003) is a Portuguese swimmer. She is the first Portuguese to win gold in a European Aquatics Championship.

== Career ==
Camila Rebelo started swimming at 2 years old, in the municipal pool of Lousã.

At the 2022 Mediterranean Games, in Oran, Camila gained two gold medals, one at the 100 metre backstroke event, finishing 1m01.34s; and the other in 200 metre backstroke. She was the only participant to reach two first places in the competition.

In 2023, she was the first Portuguese person to qualify for the 2024 Summer Olympics, by winning the 200 metre backstroke event at the 2023 Open de España de Primavera de Natación, in Palma de Mallorca, with a time of 2:09.84 minutes, setting a new record for Portugal. In the same year, at the 2021 Summer World University Games, in Chengdu, Camila won the silver medals in 200 metre and 100 metre backstroke, which made her the first female Portuguese swimmer to reach a world podium. In December, she placed fifth in the 2023 European Short Course Swimming Championships, in Otopeni.

On 18 June 2024, at 21 years old, she won the gold medal in the 200 metres backstroke at the 2024 European Aquatics Championships, in Belgrade, becoming the first Portuguese to win gold in the history of the championship and setting a new national record of 2:08.95 minutes.
