= Lucile Tessariol =

French swimmer (born 2004)

Personal information
- Nationality: French
- Born: 6 January 2004 (age 22)

Sport
- Sport: Swimming
Medal record
Women's swimming
Representing France
European Championships (LC)
Gold medal – first place	2022 Rome	4×100 m mixed freestyle
Silver medal – second place	2022 Rome	4×200 m mixed freestyle
Mediterranean Games
Silver medal – second place	2022 Oran	4×100 m freestyle

Lucile Tessariol (born 6 January 2004) is a French swimmer. She competed in the women's 4 × 200 metre freestyle relay at the 2020 European Aquatics Championships and in the women's 4 × 200 metre freestyle relay at the 2020 Summer Olympics. with the French team finishing fourth and eighth respectively.
