= Tjaša Pintar =

Slovenian swimmer (born 1997)

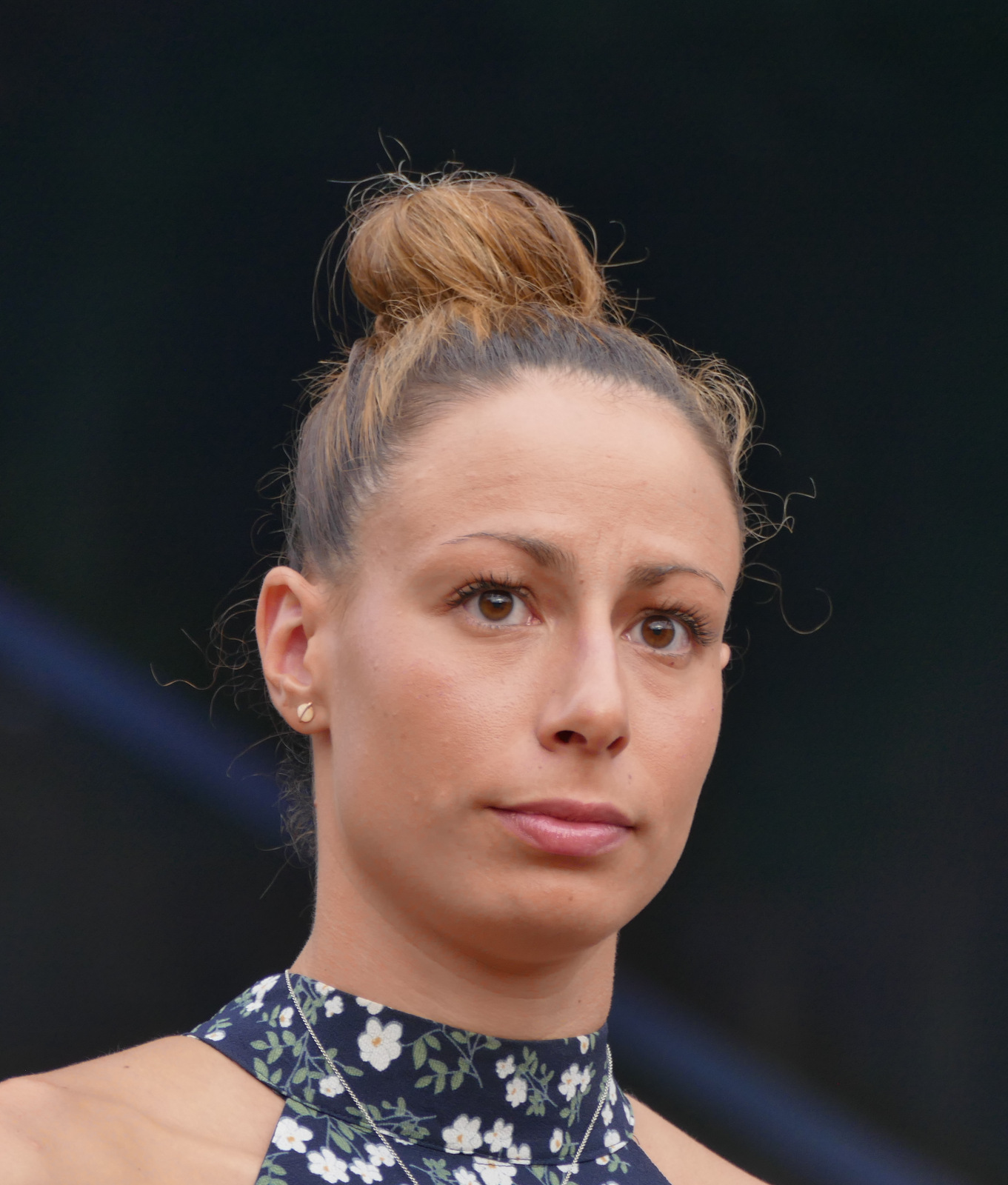
- Pintar in 2022

Personal information
- Born: 15 February 1997 (age 29) Ljubljana, Slovenia
- Height: 175 cm (5 ft 9 in)

Sport
- Sport: Swimming
Medal record
Women's swimming
Representing Slovenia
Mediterranean Games
Gold medal – first place	2022 Oran	4×200 m freestyle
Gold medal – first place	2022 Oran	4×100 m freestyle

Tjaša Pintar (born 15 February 1997) is a Slovenian swimmer.

At the 2011 European Youth Summer Olympic Festival, she earned a silver medal in the women's 200 m individual medley event and bronze medals in the women's 100 m breaststroke and 4 x 100 m freestyle relay events. In 2014, she represented Slovenia at the Summer Youth Olympics held in Nanjing, China.

Pintar competed on the Slovenian team in the women's 4 × 200 metre freestyle relay event at the 2016 Summer Olympics. At the 2022 Mediterranean Games, Pintar earned gold medals in the women's 4×100 m freestyle and 4×200 m freestyle events.

She also competed for Slovenia at the 2024 Summer Olympics.
