= Janja Šegel =

Slovenian swimmer (born 2001)

Personal information
- Nationality: Slovenian
- Born: 17 June 2001 (age 25) Ravne na Koroškem, Slovenia
- Height: 177 cm (5 ft 10 in)
- Weight: 60 kg (132 lb)

Sport
- Sport: Swimming
- Club: PK Fuzinar
Medal record
Women's swimming
Representing Slovenia
Mediterranean Games
| Gold medal – first place | 2022 Oran | 200 m freestyle |
| Gold medal – first place | 2022 Oran | 4×200 m freestyle |
| Gold medal – first place | 2022 Oran | 4×100 m freestyle |
| Silver medal – second place | 2022 Oran | 100 m freestyle |
European Youth Olympic Festival
| Gold medal – first place | 2015 Tbilisi | 100 m freestyle |
| Gold medal – first place | 2015 Tbilisi | 4x100 m medley |
| Silver medal – second place | 2015 Tbilisi | 50 m freestyle |
| Silver medal – second place | 2015 Tbilisi | 200 m freestyle |
| Bronze medal – third place | 2015 Tbilisi | 4x100 m mixed medley |

Janja Šegel (born 17 June 2001) is a Slovenian swimmer. She competed on the Slovenian team in the women's 4 × 200 metre freestyle relay event at the 2016 Summer Olympics.

Šegel also competed for Slovenia at the 2020 Summer Olympics and 2024 Summer Olympics.
