= Greece at the 2022 Mediterranean Games =

- IOC code: GRE
- NOC: Hellenic Olympic Committee

in Oran
- Competitors: 174 in 22 sports
- Flag bearers: Anna Korakaki, Efthimios Mitas
- Medals Ranked 8th: Gold 10 Silver 11 Bronze 10 Total 31

Mediterranean Games appearances (overview)
- 1951; 1955; 1959; 1963; 1967; 1971; 1975; 1979; 1983; 1987; 1991; 1993; 1997; 2001; 2005; 2009; 2013; 2018; 2022

Greece competed at the 2022 Mediterranean Games in Oran, Algeria from 25 June to 6 July 2022.

== Medal summary ==
=== Medal table ===
Medal	Name	Sport	Event	Date
Gold	Dionysios Xenos	Karate	−67 kg	26 June
Gold	Kyriaki Kydonaki	Karate	−67 kg	27 June
Gold	Maria Prevolaraki	Wrestling	−53 kg	30 June
Gold	Evangelos Makrygiannis	Swimming	100 m backstroke	1 July
Gold	Dimitrios Markos, Evangelos Makrygiannis, Konstantinos Stamou, Andreas Vazaios	Swimming	4×200 m freestyle	1 July
Gold	Anna Korakaki	Shooting	10m air pistol	2 July
Gold	Anna Ntountounaki	Swimming	50m butterfly	2 July
Gold	Dimitrios Markos	Swimming	400m freestyle	3 July
Gold	Andreas Vazaios	Swimming	200m individual medley	3 July
Gold	Kristian Gkolomeev	Swimming	50m freestyle	4 July
Silver	Emmanouela Katzouraki	Shooting	Women's Skeet	29 June
Silver	Efthimios Mitas	Shooting	Men's Skeet	29 June
Silver	Theodoros Tselidis	Judo	-90kg	1 July
Silver	Sofia Georgopoulou	Weightlifting	-59kg arraché	2 July
Silver	Dimitrios Markos	Swimming	1500 m freestyle	3 July
Silver	Anna Ntountounaki	Swimming	50m backstroke	3 July
Silver	Andreas Vazaios , Stergios Bilas, Kristian Gkolomeev, Dimitrios Markos	Swimming	4×100 m freestyle	3 July
Silver	Tatiana Gousin	Athletics	High jump	3 July
Silver	Anna Ntountounaki	Swimming	100m butterfly	4 July
Silver	Andreas Vazaios	Swimming	200m butterfly	4 July
Silver	Dimitrios Markos	Swimming	200m freestyle	5 July
Bronze	Georgios Prevolarakis	Wrestling	−77 kg	28 June
Bronze	Greek men's team (Konstantinos Konstantinopoulos & Ioannis Sgouropoulos)	Table tennis	Men's tournament	28 June
Bronze	Vagkan Nanitzanian	Boxing	-91 kg	29 June
Bronze	Ioannis Nyfantopoulos	Athletics	100 metres	30 June
Bronze	Elisavet Teltsidou	Judo	-70kg	30 June
Bronze	Kristian Gkolomeev	Swimming	100m backstroke	1 July
Bronze	Ioannis Rizos	Athletics	Pole vault	2 July
Bronze	Elisavet Pesiridou	Athletics	100m hurdles	3 July
Bronze	Konstantinos Chamalidis	Taekwondo	-68kg	3 July
Bronze	Apostolos Telikostoglou	Taekwondo	-80kg	4 July

Multiple medalists
Name	Sport	1st place, gold medalist(s)	2nd place, silver medalist(s)	3rd place, bronze medalist(s)	Total
Dimitrios Markos	Swimming	2	3	0	5
Andreas Vazaios	Swimming	2	2	0	4
Evangelos Makrygiannis	Swimming	2	0	0	2
Anna Ntountounaki	Swimming	1	2	0	3
Kristian Golomeev	Swimming	1	1	1	3

Medals by sport
Sport	1st place, gold medalist(s)	2nd place, silver medalist(s)	3rd place, bronze medalist(s)	Total
Athletics	0	1	3	4
Boxing	0	0	1	1
Judo	0	1	1	2
Karate	2	0	0	2
Shooting	1	2	0	3
Swimming	6	6	1	13
Taekwondo	0	0	2	2
Tabletennis	0	0	1	1
Weightlifting	0	1	0	1
Wrestling	1	0	1	2
Total	10	11	10	31

== Archery ==
Greece competed in archery.

Men

Athlete	Event	Ranking round		Round of 64	Round of 32	Round of 16	Quarterfinals	Semifinals	Final / BM	
Athlete	Event	Score	Seed	Opposition Score	Opposition Score	Opposition Score	Opposition Score	Opposition Score	Opposition Score	Rank
Alexandros Karageorgiou	Individual	611	24	Bye	Acha (ESP); L 0-6	Did not advance				

Women

Athlete	Event	Ranking round		Round of 32	Round of 16	Quarterfinals	Semifinals	Final / BM	
Athlete	Event	Score	Seed	Opposition Score	Opposition Score	Opposition Score	Opposition Score	Opposition Score	Rank
Anatoli Martha Gkorila	Individual	644	2	Bye	Psarra (GRE); L 2-6	Did not advance			
Maria Nasoula	Individual	630	10	Kourouna (CYP); L 4-6	Did not advance				
Evangelia Psarra	Individual	616	15	Čavič (SLO); W 7-1	Gkorila (GRE); W 6-2	Boari (ITA); L 4-6	Did not advance		
Anatoli Martha Gkorila; Maria Nasoula; Evangelia Psarra	Team	1890	3	—N/a		Slovenia; W w/o	Italy; L 0-6	France; L 2-6	4

Mixed

Athlete	Event	Ranking round		Round of 16	Quarterfinals	Semifinals	Final / BM	
Athlete	Event	Score	Seed	Opposition Score	Opposition Score	Opposition Score	Opposition Score	Rank
Anatoli Martha Gkorila; Alexandros Karageorgiou	Mixed team	1255	6	Brkić (SRB); Stefanović (SRB); W 6-2	Čavič (SLO); Ravnikar (SLO); W 5-4	Boari (ITA); Nespoli (ITA); L 0-6	Canales (ESP); Alvariño (ESP); L 2-6	4

== Basketball ==
Greece competed in basketball.

Event	Group matches				Quarterfinals	Semifinals	Final / BM	
Event	Opposition Score	Opposition Score	Opposition Score	Rank	Opposition Score	Opposition Score	Opposition Score	Rank
Men's Tournament	(Croatia) Croatia; W 17–16	(Egypt) Egypt; W 18–15	(Tunisia) Tunisia; W 17–13	1	(France) France; L 20–22	(Portugal) Portugal; L 17–19	(Croatia) Croatia; L 12–21	8
Women's Tournament	(Slovenia) Slovenia; L 11–15	(Spain) Spain; L 13–21	(Turkey) Turkey; L 13–15	4	Bye	(Egypt) Egypt; W 17–11	(Algeria) Algeria; W 16–9	9

== Football ==
Summary

Team	Event	Group stage				Semifinal	Final / BM	
Team	Event	Opposition Score	Opposition Score	Opposition Score	Rank	Opposition Score	Opposition Score	Rank
Greece U18 men's	Men's tournament	Turkey; L 1–2	Italy; L 0–4	Portugal; W 2–0	4	did not advance		

Group play

Pos	Team	Pld	W	D	L	GF	GA	GD	Pts	Qualification
1	Italy	3	2	1	0	5	0	+5	7	Semifinals
2	Turkey	3	1	1	1	2	3	−1	4	Semifinals
3	Portugal	3	1	0	2	2	3	−1	3	
4	Greece	3	1	0	2	3	6	−3	3	

Source: Oran 2022
26 June 2022
17:00

Greece	1–2	Turkey
Volakis 81'	Report	Yılmaz 39'; Biçer 45+1'

Mers El Hadjadj Stadium, Mers El Hadjadj
Referee: Jérémie Pignard (France)

28 June 2022
17:00

Italy	4–0	Greece
Raimondo 47', 65', 90+1' (pen.); D'Andrea 79' (pen.)	Report

Mers El Hadjadj Stadium, Mers El Hadjadj
Referee: Lotfi Bekouassa (Algeria)

30 June 2022
17:00

Portugal	0–2	Greece
	Report	Koutsias 76', 79'

Abdelkrim Kerroum Stadium, Sig
Referee: Lamia Atman (Algeria)

== Handball ==
Summary

Team	Event	Group stage					Semifinal	Final / BM / Pl.	
Team	Event	Opposition Score	Opposition Score	Opposition Score	Opposition Score	Rank	Opposition Score	Opposition Score	Rank
Greece men's	Men's tournament	North Macedonia; L 21–39	Algeria; L 25–35	Spain; L 21–46	Turkey; L 26–28	5	—N/a	Slovenia; W 10–0	9

=== Men's tournament ===
Group play

Pos	Team	Pld	W	D	L	GF	GA	GD	Pts	Qualification
1	Spain	4	4	0	0	154	81	+73	8	Semifinals
2	North Macedonia	4	2	1	1	116	98	+18	5	Semifinals
3	Algeria (H)	4	2	1	1	110	107	+3	5	Fifth place game
4	Turkey	4	1	0	3	96	135	−39	2	Seventh place game
5	Greece	4	0	0	4	93	148	−55	0	Ninth place game

Source: Oran 2022
Rules for classification: 1) Points; 2) Head-to-head points; 3) Head-to-head goal difference; 4) Head-to-head goals scored; 5) Goal difference; 6) Goals scored; 7) Draw.
(H) Hosts

27 June 2022; 20:00	North Macedonia	39–21	Greece	24 February Indoor Hall, Arzew; Referees: Jakovljević, Sando Kovačević (SRB)
27 June 2022; 20:00	Serafimov 7	(20–13)	Pagiatis 5	24 February Indoor Hall, Arzew; Referees: Jakovljević, Sando Kovačević (SRB)
27 June 2022; 20:00	1× (suspension)	Report	1× (yellow card) 3× (suspension) 1× (red card)	24 February Indoor Hall, Arzew; Referees: Jakovljević, Sando Kovačević (SRB)

30 June 2022; 19:00	Greece	25–35	Algeria	24 February Indoor Hall, Arzew; Referees: Díaz-Flores, Pérez (ESP)
30 June 2022; 19:00	Dikaioulias 4	(13–17)	Naïm 7	24 February Indoor Hall, Arzew; Referees: Díaz-Flores, Pérez (ESP)
30 June 2022; 19:00	4× (suspension)	Report	1× (yellow card) 2× (suspension)	24 February Indoor Hall, Arzew; Referees: Díaz-Flores, Pérez (ESP)

1 July 2022; 17:00	Spain	46–21	Greece	24 February Indoor Hall, Arzew; Referees: Rodrigues, Pinherio (POR)
1 July 2022; 17:00	Folqués, Odriozola 6	(24–10)	three players 4	24 February Indoor Hall, Arzew; Referees: Rodrigues, Pinherio (POR)
1 July 2022; 17:00	2× (suspension)	Report	2× (suspension)	24 February Indoor Hall, Arzew; Referees: Rodrigues, Pinherio (POR)

2 July 2022; 17:00	Greece	26–28	Turkey	24 February Indoor Hall, Arzew; Referees: Farsi, Kahouadji (ALG)
2 July 2022; 17:00	Stefanitsis 4	(14–11)	Şirin 7	24 February Indoor Hall, Arzew; Referees: Farsi, Kahouadji (ALG)
2 July 2022; 17:00	6× (suspension)	Report	2× (yellow card) 3× (suspension) 1× (red card)	24 February Indoor Hall, Arzew; Referees: Farsi, Kahouadji (ALG)

Ninth place game

Cancelled	Slovenia	0–10	Greece	24 February Indoor Hall, Arzew

== Taekwondo ==
Greece competed in Taekwondo.

Men

Athlete	Event	Round of 32	Round of 16	Quarterfinals	Semifinals	Final	
Athlete	Event	Opposition Result	Opposition Result	Opposition Result	Opposition Result	Opposition Result	Rank
Konstantinos Chamalidis	68 kg	Bye	Arber Azemi (KOS); W 18–8	Lin Kovačič (SLO); W 20–11	Javier Pérez (ESP); L 3–16	Did not advance	3rd place, bronze medalist(s)
Apostolos Telikostoglou	80 kg	—N/a	Bye	Stefan Takov (SRB); W 5–1	Daniel Quesada (ESP); L 1–13	Did not advance	3rd place, bronze medalist(s)

Women

Athlete	Event	Round of 16	Quarterfinals	Semifinals	Final	
Athlete	Event	Opposition Result	Opposition Result	Opposition Result	Opposition Result	Rank
Faidra Kalteki	57 kg	Bye	Kanélya Carabin (FRA); L 12–14	Did not advance		

== Volleyball ==
Greece competed in volleyball.

Team	Event	Group stage				Quarter-final	Semifinal	Final / BM / Pl.	
Team	Event	Opposition Score	Opposition Score	Opposition Score	Rank	Opposition Score	Opposition Score	Opposition Score	Rank
Greece men's	Men's tournament	France; L 2-3	Turkey; W 3-2	Algeria; W 3-0	3	Croatia; L 0-3	Turkey; L 1-3	Egypt; W 3-1	7
Greece women's	Women's tournament	Tunisia; W 3-0	Egypt; W 3-0	North Macedonia; W 3-0	1	Spain; L 0-3	Croatia; W 3-1	Egypt; W 3-1	5

== Water polo ==
Summary

Team	Event	Group stage				Semifinal	Final / BM / Pl.	
Team	Event	Opposition Score	Opposition Score	Opposition Score	Rank	Opposition Score	Opposition Score	Rank
Greece men's	Men's tournament	Spain; L 11–12	Turkey; W 21–7	Italy; L 6–10	3	—N/a	Slovenia; W 16–12	5

Group play

Pos	Team	Pld	W	D	L	GF	GA	GD	Pts	Qualification
1	Spain	3	3	0	0	41	27	+14	6	Semifinals
2	Italy	3	2	0	1	31	22	+9	4	Semifinals
3	Greece	3	1	0	2	38	29	+9	2	Fifth place game
4	Turkey	3	0	0	3	17	49	−32	0	Seventh place game

Source: Oran 2022

24 June 2022; 16:00	Report	Greece	11–12	Spain	Oran; Referees: Igor Virijević (SRB), Ghislain Dehon (FRA)
24 June 2022; 16:00	Report	Score by quarters: 2–2, 2–4, 4–2, 3–4			Oran; Referees: Igor Virijević (SRB), Ghislain Dehon (FRA)
24 June 2022; 16:00	Report	four players 2	Goals	López 5	Oran; Referees: Igor Virijević (SRB), Ghislain Dehon (FRA)

26 June 2022; 18:00	Report	Greece	21–7	Turkey	Oran; Referees: Eurico da Silva (POR), Matevž Homovec (SLO)
26 June 2022; 18:00	Report	Score by quarters: 4–2, 4–3, 7–1, 6–1			Oran; Referees: Eurico da Silva (POR), Matevž Homovec (SLO)
26 June 2022; 18:00	Report	Spachits 4	Goals	Erçıkdı, Koyuncu 2	Oran; Referees: Eurico da Silva (POR), Matevž Homovec (SLO)

28 June 2022; 18:00	Report	Italy	10–6	Greece	Oran; Referees: Eurico da Silva (POR), Igor Virijević (SRB)
28 June 2022; 18:00	Report	Score by quarters: 1–1, 4–2, 3–2, 2–1			Oran; Referees: Eurico da Silva (POR), Igor Virijević (SRB)
28 June 2022; 18:00	Report	Bragantini, Nenni 3	Goals	Almyras, Kandanoleon 2	Oran; Referees: Eurico da Silva (POR), Igor Virijević (SRB)

Fifth place game

29 June 2022; 12:00	Report	Greece	16–12	Slovenia	Oran; Referees: Sergio Jiménez (ESP), Ghislain Dehon (FRA)
29 June 2022; 12:00	Report	Score by quarters: 5–1, 2–4, 5–4, 4–3			Oran; Referees: Sergio Jiménez (ESP), Ghislain Dehon (FRA)
29 June 2022; 12:00	Report	Bitsakos, Mathiopoulos 3	Goals	Lah 5	Oran; Referees: Sergio Jiménez (ESP), Ghislain Dehon (FRA)
