= Bir El Djir =

- Commune and town
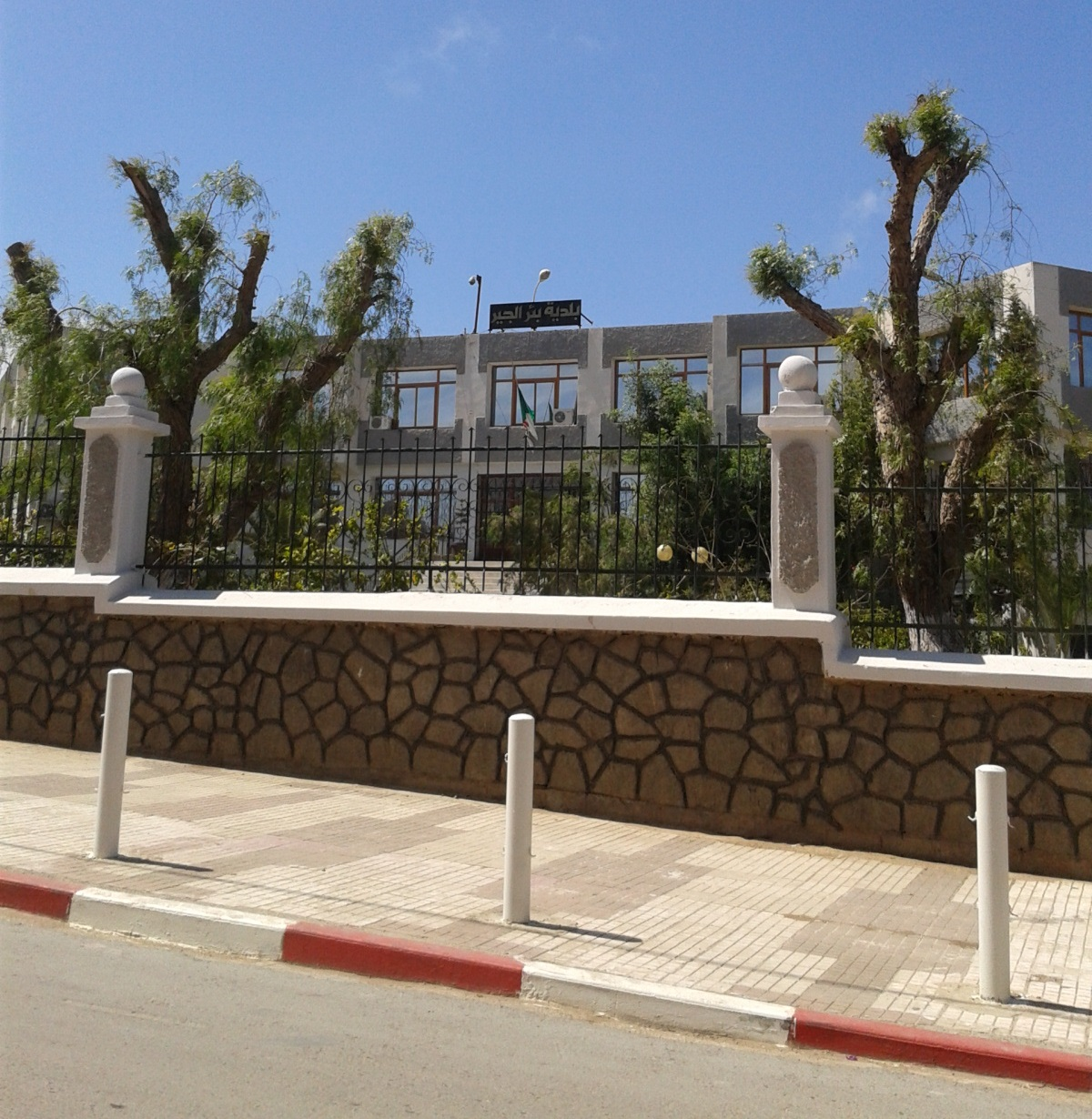

- Location within Algeria
- Coordinates: 35°44′12″N 0°33′15″W
- Country: Algeria
- Province: Oran Province
- District: Bir El Djir District

Area
  - Total: 12.53 sq mi (32.46 km^{2})

Population (2009)
  - Total: 171,883
  - Density: 13,710/sq mi (5,295/km^{2})
- Time zone: UTC+1 (CET)
- Postal code: 31130

Bir El Djir (Arabic: بئر الجير), formerly known as Arcole, is a town and commune in the Oran Province, Algeria. It is an eastern suburb of Oran, the province's capital. In 2009, it had a population of 171,883 people.

== Toponymy ==
The name of the town is thought to come from the Arabic words بئر (bir) and جِير (jir), which together translate roughly as "spring [of] the lime", or "lime spring". During the French colonial period, the town was called Arcole, which referred to the Battle of Arcole.

== University ==
Bir El Djir hosts the University of Oran 2 Mohamed Ben Ahmed

== 2022 Mediterranean Games ==
Bir El Djir is one of the three venues that held the 2022 Mediterranean Games in Oran.

== See also ==
- Bir El Djir District
- List of universities in Algeria
