= Algeria at the 2022 Mediterranean Games =

- IOC code: ALG
- NOC: Algerian Olympic Committee

in Oran, Algeria 25 June–6 July 2022
- Competitors: 386 in 24 sports
- Flag bearers: Messaoud Dris; Imane Khelif
- Medals Ranked 4th: Gold 20 Silver 17 Bronze 16 Total 53

Mediterranean Games appearances (overview)
- 1967; 1971; 1975; 1979; 1983; 1987; 1991; 1993; 1997; 2001; 2005; 2009; 2013; 2018; 2022; 2026

Algeria competed at the 2022 Mediterranean Games in Oran, Algeria over 10 days from 25 June to 5 July 2022 with delegation of 522 persons (324 athletes in 24 sports), including 293 men and 182 women. The country finished the Games with 53 medals amongst all nations: 20 gold, 17 silver, and 16 bronze. This is the best participation in the history of Algeria, breaking the number of the 2001 Mediterranean Games. The sports with the most medals were Athletics, Karate and Boxing. The first medals Algeria earned were in Karate, where Algeria won six medals, including four golds by Cylia Ouikene, Louiza Abouriche and Chaima Midi for women's and Oussama Zaid for men's. In Boxing, Algeria participated with fifteen men's and women's boxers, 13 of whom won medals including five golds through Jugurtha Ait Bekka, Roumaysa Boualam, Hadjila Khelif, Imane Khelif and Yahia Abdelli. The third specialty in terms of medals is strong Athletics with a total of 13 medals, including five golds, by Bilal Tabti in 3000 m steeplechase, Yasser Triki in Triple jump, Bilel Afer in high jump, Djamel Sedjati in 800 m and finally the Men's 4×400 m relay team.

In other sports participation was different and in Badminton duo Koceila Mammeri and Youcef Sabri Medel won a historic gold, and the only one in this specialty, by defeating the Spanish duo Luis Enrique Penalver Pereira and Pablo Abian Vicen. In fencing Algeria won its first gold medal in history with Saoussen Boudiaf winning against Italian Rebecca Gargano. In Judo, from which a lot was expected of Algeria, they earned four medals, one of which was gold by Messaoud Dris in 73 kg, defeating Moroccan Hassan Doukkali by Ippon. In wrestling, swimming and weightlifting, he won one gold medal in each discipline: Bachir Sid Azara in men's Greco-Roman as for Ishak Ghaiou and Abdelkrim Ouakali get the silver medal. Jaouad Syoud in 200 m individual medley and Walid Bidani in snatch +102 kg and was satisfied with silver in Clean & jerk.

== Medal summary ==
=== Medal table ===
Medal	Name	Sport	Event	Date
Gold	Cylia Ouikene	Karate	Women's 50 kg	26 June
Gold	Louiza Abouriche	Karate	Women's 55 kg	26 June
Gold	Oussama Zaid	Karate	Men's 75 kg	26 June
Gold	Chaima Midi	Karate	Women's 61 kg	26 June
Gold	Koceila Mammeri; Youcef Sabri Medel	Badminton	Men's doubles	27 June
Gold	Bachir Sid Azara	Wrestling	Men's Greco-Roman 87 kg	27 June
Gold	Messaoud Dris	Judo	Men's 73 kg	30 June
Gold	Bilal Tabti	Athletics	Men's 3000 m steeplechase	30 June
Gold	Yasser Triki	Athletics	Triple jump	30 June
Gold	Jugurtha Ait Bekka	Boxing	Men's welterweight	1 July
Gold	Roumaysa Boualam	Boxing	Women's minimumweight	1 July
Gold	Hadjila Khelif	Boxing	Women's lightweight	1 July
Gold	Imane Khelif	Boxing	Women's light welterweight	1 July
Gold	Yahia Abdelli	Boxing	Men's light welterweight	1 July
Gold	Bilel Afer	Athletics	Men's high jump	1 July
Gold	Saoussen Boudiaf	Fencing	Women's Sabre	3 July
Gold	Djamel Sedjati	Athletics	Men's 800 m	3 July
Gold	Jaouad Syoud	Swimming	Men's 200 m individual medley	3 July
Gold	Abdennour Bendjemaa; Mohamed Ali Gouaned; Abdelmalik Lahoulou; Slimane Moula	Athletics	Men's 4×400 m relay	3 July
Gold	Walid Bidani	Weightlifting	Men's snatch +102 kg	4 July
Silver	Ala Salmi	Karate	Men's 60 kg	26 June
Silver	Hocine Daikhi	Karate	Men's +84 kg	27 June
Silver	Ishak Ghaiou	Wrestling	Men's Greco-Roman 67 kg	27 June
Silver	Abdelkrim Ouakali	Wrestling	Men's Greco-Roman 77 kg	27 June
Silver	Lamia Aissioui	Boules	Women's raffa singles	29 June
Silver	Mustapha Bouamar	Judo	Men's 100 kg	1 July
Silver	Mohamed Sofiane Belrekaa	Judo	Men's +100 kg	1 July
Silver	Ichrak Chaib	Boxing	Women's welterweight	1 July
Silver	Oussama Mordjane	Boxing	Men's featherweight	1 July
Silver	Younes Nemouchi	Boxing	Men's middleweight	1 July
Silver	Mohammed Houmri	Boxing	Men's light heavyweight	1 July
Silver	Moh Said Hamani	Boxing	Men's heavyweight	1 July
Silver	Maghnia Hammadi	Weightlifting	Women's snatch 71 kg	3 July
Silver	Yassine Hathat	Athletics	Men's 800 m	3 July
Silver	Amine Bouanani	Athletics	Men's 110 m hurdles	3 July
Silver	Walid Bidani	Weightlifting	Men's Clean & jerk +102 kg	4 July
Silver	Jaouad Syoud	Swimming	Men's 100 m butterfly	5 July
Bronze	Mohamed Faycal Ouaghlissi	Boules	Men's pétanque singles	28 June
Bronze	Lamia Aissioui; Chahrezad Chibani	Boules	Women's raffa doubles	28 June
Bronze	Chouaib Bouloudinat	Boxing	Super heavyweight	29 June
Bronze	Fatma Zohra Hadjala	Boxing	Bantamweight	30 June
Bronze	Amina Belkadi	Judo	Women's 63 kg	30 June
Bronze	Hichem Bouchicha	Athletics	Men's 3000 m steeplechase	30 June
Bronze	Zouina Bouzebra	Athletics	Women's Hammer throw	30 June
Bronze	Abdelnacer Benlaribi	Boxing	Lightweight	30 June
Bronze	Hichem Bouhanoune	Athletics	Men's Long jump	1 July
Bronze	Abdelmalik Lahoulou	Athletics	Men's 400 m hurdles	1 July
Bronze	Abdennour Bendjemaa	Athletics	Men's 400 m	2 July
Bronze	Maghnia Hammadi	Weightlifting	Women's Clean & jerk 71 kg	3 July
Bronze	Faris Touairi	Weightlifting	Men's snatch 89 kg	3 July
Bronze	Yasser Triki	Athletics	Men's Long jump	3 July
Bronze	Oussama Sahnoune	Swimming	Men's 50 m freestyle	4 July
Bronze	Jaouad Syoud	Swimming	Men's 200 m butterfly	4 July

Medals by sport
Sport	1st place, gold medalist(s)	2nd place, silver medalist(s)	3rd place, bronze medalist(s)	Total
Athletics	5	2	6	13
Badminton	1	0	0	1
Boxing	5	5	3	13
Boules	0	1	2	3
Judo	1	2	1	4
Fencing	1	0	0	1
Karate	4	2	0	6
Swimming	1	1	2	4
Weightlifting	1	2	2	5
Wrestling	1	2	0	3
Total	20	17	16	53

Medals by date
Day	Date	1st place, gold medalist(s)	2nd place, silver medalist(s)	3rd place, bronze medalist(s)	Total
1	26 June	4	1	0	5
2	27 June	2	3	0	5
3	28 June	0	0	2	2
4	29 June	0	1	1	2
5	30 June	3	0	5	8
6	1 July	6	7	2	15
7	2 July	0	0	1	1
8	3 July	4	3	3	10
9	4 July	1	1	2	4
10	5 July	0	1	0	1
Total		20	17	16	53

Medals by gender
Gender	1st place, gold medalist(s)	2nd place, silver medalist(s)	3rd place, bronze medalist(s)	Total	Percentage
Male	13	14	11	38	71.7%
Female	7	3	5	15	28.3%
Total	20	17	16	53	100%

Multiple medalists
Name	Sport	1st place, gold medalist(s)	2nd place, silver medalist(s)	3rd place, bronze medalist(s)	Total
Jaouad Syoud	Swimming	1	1	1	3
Walid Bidani	Weightlifting	1	1	0	2
Abdelmalik Lahoulou	Athletics	1	0	1	2
Abdennour Bendjemaa	Athletics	1	0	1	2
Yasser Triki	Athletics	1	0	1	2
Maghnia Hammadi	Weightlifting	0	1	1	2
Lamia Aissioui	Boules	0	1	1	2

== Archery ==
Men

Athlete	Event	Ranking round		Round of 64	Round of 32	Round of 16	Quarterfinals	Semifinals	Final / BM	
Athlete	Event	Score	Seed	Opposition Score	Opposition Score	Opposition Score	Opposition Score	Opposition Score	Opposition Score	Rank
Abdelmajid Hocine	Individual	598	14	Bye	Alvariño (ESP); L 0-6	Did not advance				
Imadeddine Bakri	Individual	596	9	Aborgiba (LBA); W 6-0	Malavašič (SLO); W w/o	Carneiro (POR); L 4-6	Did not advance			
Ayoub Rahlaoui	Individual	580	7	Bye	Nespoli (ITA); L 0-6	Did not advance				
Abdelmajid Hocine; Imadeddine Bakri; Ayoub Rahlaoui	Team	1774	30	—N/a		Turkey; L 0-6	Did not advance			

Women

Athlete	Event	Ranking round		Round of 64	Round of 32	Round of 16	Quarterfinals	Semifinals	Final / BM	
Athlete	Event	Score	Seed	Opposition Score	Opposition Score	Opposition Score	Opposition Score	Opposition Score	Opposition Score	Rank
Yasmine Bellal	Individual	583	11	—N/a	Rebagliati (ITA); L 0-6	Did not advance				

== Athletics (track and field) ==
Key

- Note–Ranks given for track events are within the athlete's heat only
- Q = Qualified for the next round
- q = Qualified for the next round as a fastest loser or, in field events, by position without achieving the qualifying target
- NR = National record
- N/A = Round not applicable for the event
- Bye = Athlete not required to compete in round

Track & road events
Men

Athlete	Event	Semifinal		Final	
Athlete	Event	Result	Rank	Result	Rank
Youcef Sahel	100 m	10.42 PB	3 Q	10.43	7
Skander Djamil Athmani	100 m	10.56	6	Did not advance	
Anas Es Saddik Hammouni	400 m	46.65	2 Q	46.77	6
Abdennour Bendjemaa	400 m	46.65	3 q	46.06 PB	3rd place, bronze medalist(s)
Djamel Sedjati	800 m	1:46.39	1 Q	1:44.52	1st place, gold medalist(s)
Yassine Hathat	800 m	1:49.05	1 Q	1:44.79	2nd place, silver medalist(s)
Salim Keddar	1500 m	—N/a		3:44.18	7
Mohamed-amine Drabli	1500 m	—N/a		3:45.14	8
Mohammed Merbouhi	5000 m	—N/a		13:49.54	6
Ali Grine	5000 m	—N/a		13:54.35	7
Amine Bouanani	110 m hurdles	13.44 NR	1 Q	13.38 NR	2nd place, silver medalist(s)
Saber Boukmouche	400 m hurdles	50.38	3 Q	50.01	6
Abdelmalik Lahoulou	400 m hurdles	49.30	3 Q	48.87 SB	3rd place, bronze medalist(s)
Bilal Tabti	3000 m steeplechase	—N/a		8:22.79	1st place, gold medalist(s)
Hichem Bouchicha	3000 m steeplechase	—N/a		8:23.95	3rd place, bronze medalist(s)
Abdennour Bendjemaa; Mohamed Ali Gouaned; Abdelmalik Lahoulou; Slimane Moula	4×400 m relay	—N/a		3:03.41	1st place, gold medalist(s)
Nabil El Hannachi	Half marathon	—N/a		1:07:06	6
El Hadi Laameuch	Half marathon	—N/a		1:07:24	7
Rabah Aboud	Half marathon	—N/a		DNF	

Women

Athlete	Event	Semifinal		Final	
Athlete	Event	Result	Rank	Result	Rank
Amina Touati	100 m	12.35	6	Did not advance	
Meriem Boulehsa	400 m	—N/a		55.87 SB	7
Ghania Rezzik	800 m	2:09.90	6	Did not advance	
Roukia Mouici	800 m	DNS		Did not advance	
Amina Bettiche	1500 m	—N/a		4:18.55 SB	9
Abir Reffas	1500 m	—N/a		4:28.97 SB	11
Nawal Yahi	5000 m	—N/a		16:08.52	6
Souad Aït Salem	5000 m	—N/a		16:21.60	9
Rahil Hamel	110 m hurdles	14.02	7	Did not advance	
Loubna Benhadja	400 m hurdles	1:00.30	5	Did not advance	
Amina Bettiche	3000 m steeplechase	—N/a		9:37.18 SB	4
Loubna Benhadja; Douaa Ferdi; Chaima Ouanis; Meriem Boulehsa	4×400 m relay	—N/a		3:45.18	4
Malika Benderbal	Half marathon	—N/a		1:17:38	9
Souad Aït Salem	Half marathon	—N/a		1:18:24	10
Nawal Yahi	Half marathon	—N/a		DNF	

Field events
Men

Athlete	Event	Qualification		Final	
Athlete	Event	Distance	Position	Distance	Position
Yasser Triki	Long jump	—N/a		7.80 m SB	3rd place, bronze medalist(s)
Tarek Hocine	Long jump	—N/a		7.02 m	10
Yasser Triki	Triple jump	—N/a		17.07 m	1st place, gold medalist(s)
Rida Abina	Triple jump	—N/a		15.44 m	8
Bilel Afer	High jump	—N/a		2.24 m PB	1st place, gold medalist(s)
Hichem Bouhanoune	High jump	—N/a		2.22 m PB	3rd place, bronze medalist(s)
Hichem Khalil Cherabi	Pole vault	—N/a		5.30 m	7
Mohamed Raid Redjechta	Shot put	—N/a		15.91 m	12
Mohamed Reda Bouziane	Shot put	—N/a		15.46 m	13
KHENNOUSSI Oussama	Discus throw	—N/a		58.93 m PB	7
BOURAKBA Abdelmoumene	Discus throw	—N/a		55.93 m	11

Women

Athlete	Event	Qualification		Final	
Athlete	Event	Distance	Position	Distance	Position
Tahani Romaissa Belabiod	Long jump	—N/a		6.06 m	10
Kaoutar Selmi	Long jump	—N/a		5.86 m	13
Kaoutar Selmi	Triple jump	—N/a		13.28 PB	7
Wissal Harkas	Triple jump	—N/a		13.02 PB	8
Darina Hadil Rezik	High jump	—N/a		1.72 m	12
Afaf Ben Hadja	High jump	—N/a		1.67 m	13
Nabila Bounab	Discus throw	—N/a		42.19 m	7
Zahra Tatar	Hammer throw	—N/a		61.93 m	9
Zouina Bouzebra	Hammer throw	—N/a		65.45 m	3rd place, bronze medalist(s)

== Badminton ==
Algeria competed in badminton.

Men

Athlete	Event	Round of 32	Round of 16	Quarterfinal	Semifinal	Final	Rank
Athlete	Event	Opposition Score	Opposition Score	Opposition Score	Opposition Score	Opposition Score	Rank
Adel Hamek	Singles	Hailis (CYP); W 21-13, 21-10	Lale (TUR); L 14-21, 13-21	Did not advance			
Mohamed Abderrahime Belarbi	Singles	Gllareva (KOS); W 21-2, 21-1	Ban (CRO); L -21, -21	Did not advance			
Koceila Mammeri; Youcef Sabri Medel	Doubles	—N/a	Bye	Krapez, Ivanic (SLO); W 21-18, 21-18	Ban, Spoljarec (CRO); W 18-21, 21-15, 21-14	Penalver Pereira, Abian Vicen (ESP); W 14-21, 21-19, 21-16	1st place, gold medalist(s)

Women

Athlete	Event	Round of 32	Round of 16	Quarterfinal	Semifinal	Final	Rank
Athlete	Event	Opposition Score	Opposition Score	Opposition Score	Opposition Score	Opposition Score	Rank
Yassmina Chibah	Singles	Chrisiodoulou (CYP); L 15-21, 14-21	Did not advance				
Halla Bouksani	Singles	Hamza (ITA); L 11-21, 15-21	Did not advance				
Tanina Mammeri; Linda Mazri	Doubles	—N/a	Bye	Katirizi Ranjbar, Christodoulou (CYP); L 9-21, 9-21	Did not advance		

== Basketball ==
=== Men's 3x3 tournament ===
Group A

Pos	Team	Pld	W	L	PF	PA	PD	Qualification
1	Turkey	2	1	1	39	29	+10	Quarterfinals
2	Algeria	2	1	1	35	39	−4	Quarterfinals
3	Italy	2	1	1	31	37	−6	

Rules for classification: 1) Wins; 2) Head-to-head record; 3) Points scored.

30 June
20:00

Report

Turkey	18–19	Algeria
Pts: Bas 8		Pts: Hifi 12

Sidi M’hamed Public Garden Court, Oran
Referees: Najib Chajiddine (FRA)

1 July
22:20

Report

Algeria	16–21	Italy
Pts: Hifi 12		Pts: Valentini 9

Sidi M’hamed Public Garden Court, Oran
Referees: Vladimir Veskovic (SRB)

Quarterfinals

2 July
22:00

Report

Spain	21–18	Algeria
Pts: Rubio 9		Pts: Hifi 11

Sidi M’hamed Public Garden Court, Oran
Referees: Vladimir Veskovic (SRB)

5–8th place semifinals

3 July
19:50

Report

Algeria	17–15 (OT)	Croatia

Sidi M’hamed Public Garden Court, Oran
Referees: Najib Chajiddine (FRA)

3 July
21:10

Report

Portugal	21–17	Algeria

Sidi M’hamed Public Garden Court, Oran
Referees: Vladimir Veskovic (SRB)

=== Women's 3x3 tournament ===
Group A

Pos	Team	Pld	W	L	PF	PA	PD	Qualification
1	Serbia	2	2	0	25	18	+7	Quarterfinals
2	Portugal	2	1	1	26	27	−1	Quarterfinals
3	Algeria	2	0	2	20	26	−6	

Rules for classification: 1) Wins; 2) Head-to-head record; 3) Points scored.

30 June
20:40

Report

Algeria	7–11	Serbia
Pts: Gribi, Belabbas 3		Pts: Jelic 7

Sidi M’hamed Public Garden Court, Oran
Referees: Maria Giulia Forni (ITA)

1 July
19:40

Report

Portugal	15–13	Algeria
Pts: De Lima Viegas 9		Pts: Belabbas 10

Sidi M’hamed Public Garden Court, Oran
Referees: Najib Chjiddine (FRA)

Ninth place game

2 July
22:40

Report

Greece	16–9	Algeria

Sidi M’hamed Public Garden Court, Oran
Referees: Pedro Henrique Ribeiro Da Silva (POR)

== Boules ==
Lyonnaise

Pétanque

Athlete	Event	Group stage			Quarterfinals	Semifinal	Final / BM	
Athlete	Event	Opposition Score	Opposition Score	Rank	Opposition Score	Opposition Score	Opposition Score	Rank
Abdeldjalil Boukhefardji; Mohamed Fayçal Ouaghlissi	Men's doubles	Peres; Viegas Das Dores (POR); W 9-4	Akbas; Bajjioui (MAR); W 12-5	1	Amormino; Chiaprllo (ITA); L 5-13	Did not advance		
Ibtissam Baba Arbi; Nour El Houda Bouguerra	Women's doubles	Campillo; Crovetto (MON); W 12-0	Ghariz; Gourar (MAR); W 11-5	1	—N/a	Diaz Reyes; Homar Mayol (ESP); W 3-11	Esen; Tatarli (TUR); W 2-1	3rd place, bronze medalist(s)

Raffa

Athlete	Event	Group stage				Quarterfinals	Semifinal	Final / BM	
Athlete	Event	Opposition Score	Opposition Score	Opposition Score	Rank	Opposition Score	Opposition Score	Opposition Score	Rank
Hakim Ali	Men's singles	Rouault (FRA); L 9-12	Alswesi (LBA)	Rouault (FRA)					
Lamia Aissioui	Women's singles	Paoletti (SMR); L 8-12	Tahraoui (FRA); W 12-4	Morelli (ITA); W 11-10	1	Did not advance		Cil (TUR); L 7-9	2nd place, silver medalist(s)
Hakim Ali; Tarek Zekiri	Men's doubles	Alswesi; Issa (LBA); L 8-12	? ? (EGY); W 12-0	Dall'Olmo; Frisoni (SMR); W 12-6					

== Boxing ==
Algeria competed in boxing.

Men

Athlete	Event	Round of 16	Quarterfinals	Semifinals	Final	
Athlete	Event	Opposition Result	Opposition Result	Opposition Result	Opposition Result	Rank
Yassine Touareg	Flyweight	Ametović (SRB); L 1–2	Did not advance			
Oussama Mordjane	Featherweight	Iozia (ITA); W 3–0	Rahimic (BIH); W 3–0	Mhamdi (TUN); W 2–0	Cifici (TUR); L 0–3	2nd place, silver medalist(s)
Abdelnacer Benlaribi	Lightweight	Dogan (TUR); W 2–1	Quiles Brotons (ESP); W 3–0	Grau (FRA); L 1–2	Did not advance	3rd place, bronze medalist(s)
Yahia Abdelli	Light welterweight	—N/a	Ozmen (TUR); W 2–1	Bajoku (KOS); W 2–1	Malanga (ITA); W 3–0	1st place, gold medalist(s)
Jugurtha Ait Bekka	Welterweight	Jezek (CRO); W 3–0	Beqiri (ALB); W RSC	El Barbari (MAR); W 2–1	Savkovic (MNE); W WO	1st place, gold medalist(s)
Younes Nemouchi	Middleweight	Cuadrado (ESP); W 3–0	Cvitanovic (BIH); W 3–0	Cavallaro (ITA); W 2–1	Ghousoon (SYR); L 1–2	2nd place, silver medalist(s)
Mohammed Houmri	Light heavyweight	—N/a	Assaghir (MAR); W 3–0	Marcic (MNE); W 3–0	Mironchikov (SRB); L 1–2	2nd place, silver medalist(s)
Moh Said Hamani	Heavyweight	—N/a	Ghousoon (SYR); W 2–1	Bouafia (FRA); W 3–0	Mouhidine (ITA); L 0–3	2nd place, silver medalist(s)
Chouaib Bouloudinat	Super heavyweight	Bye	Aydemir (TUR); W 3–0	Hafez (EGY); L 0–3	Did not advance	3rd place, bronze medalist(s)

Women

Algeria has entered six female boxers to compete instead of seven after the cancellation of the 75 kg category following the absence of several boxers.

Athlete	Event	Round of 16	Quarterfinals	Semifinals	Final	
Athlete	Event	Opposition Result	Opposition Result	Opposition Result	Opposition Result	Rank
Roumaysa Boualam	Minimumweight	—N/a	Youssef (EGY); W RSC	López (ESP); W 3–0	Çağırır (TUR); W 2–0	1st place, gold medalist(s)
Fatiha Mansouri	Light flyweight	—N/a	Çakıroğlu (TUR); L 1–2	Did not advance		
Fatma Zohra Hadjala	Bantamweight	—N/a	Bertal (MAR); W 3–0	Gojković (MNE); L 0–3	Did not advance	3rd place, bronze medalist(s)
Hadjila Khelif	Lightweight	—N/a	Bye	Zidani (FRA); W 3–0	Rhaddi (MAR); W 2–0	1st place, gold medalist(s)
Imane Khelif	Light welterweight	—N/a	Mohamed (EGY); W RSC	Özer (TUR); W 3–0	Canfora (ITA); W 3–0	1st place, gold medalist(s)
Ichrak Chaib	Welterweight	—N/a	Bye	Belahbib (MAR); W WO	Sürmeneli (TUR); L 0–3	2nd place, silver medalist(s)

== Cycling ==
Athlete	Event	Time	Rank
Mohamed Amine N'Hari	Men's Individual Time Trial	34:55.44	12
Hamza Mansouri	Men's Individual Time Trial	34:13.90	9
Nesrine Houili	Women's Individual Time Trial	28:22.85	12
Azzedine Lagab	Men's road race	3:15:35	35
Youcef Reguigui	Men's road race	3:13:45	10
Yacine Hamza	Men's road race	3:15:34	26
Nassim Saidi	Men's road race	3:15:34	23
Islam Mansouri	Men's road race	3:15:35	34
Hamza Mansouri	Men's road race	DNF	
Mohamed Amine N'Hari	Men's road race	DNF	
Hamza Amari	Men's road race	3:15:34	20
Nesrine Houili	Women's road race	1:58:24	10

== Fencing ==
Men

Athlete	Event	Group stage							Round of 32	Round of 16	Quarterfinal	Semifinal	Final / BM	
Athlete	Event	Opposition Score	Opposition Score	Opposition Score	Opposition Score	Opposition Score	Opposition Score	Rank	Opposition Score	Opposition Score	Opposition Score	Opposition Score	Opposition Score	Rank
Menaouer Benreguia	Individual épée	Algadi (LBA); L 1-5	Yasseen (EGY); L 3-5	Frazao (POR); L 1-5	Fava (FRA); L 1-5	El Haouari (MAR); W 5-4	—N/a	5	Did not advance					
Raphael Jacques Hoareau-Berkani	Individual épée	Nahi (MAR); W 5-2	El-Sayed (EGY); L 2-5	Paolini (ITA); L 1-5	Srbinoski (MKD); W 5-3	Frazão (POR); L 0-5	Abujtela (LBA); W 4-3	4	Kraria (ALG); W 15-11	Yasseen (EGY); L 5-15	Did not advance			
Mohamed Cherif Kraria	Individual épée	Fabregat (ESP); W 5-2	Allègre (FRA); L 0-5	Taliotis (CYP); L 4-5	Ekenler (TUR); L 4-5	Cuomo (ITA); L 3-5	—N/a	5	Berkani (ALG); L 11-15	Did not advance				
Salim Heroui	Individual foil	Ediri (FRA); L 3-5	Tofalides (CYP); L 1-5	Abouelkassem (EGY); L 4-5	Ćuk (SRB); L 2-5	Bianchi (ITA); L 2-5	—N/a	6	Did not advance					
Dani Adam Fellah	Individual foil	Elice (FRA); L 2-5	Files (CRO); L 2-5	Luperi (ITA); L 1-5	Essam (EGY); L 3-5	Llavador (ESP); L 0-5	—N/a	6	Did not advance					
Youcef Madi	Individual foil	Minuto (TUR); L 0-5	Hamza (EGY); L 2-5	Filippi (ITA); L 1-5	Bibard (FRA); L 1-5	Macedo (POR); L 2-5	—N/a	6	Did not advance					
Adem Abdelhacib Izem	Individual sabre	Yildirim (TUR); L 1-5	Hmissi (TUN); W 5-2	Annic (FRA); L 3-5	Nuccio (ITA); L 2-5	El-Sissy (EGY); L 1-5	—N/a	5	—N/a	Cavaliere (ITA); L 4-15	Did not advance			
Youcef Abdelaziz Saad	Individual sabre	Aramburu (ESP); L 1-5	Moataz (EGY); L 3-5	F.Ferjani (TUN); L 2-5	Repetti (ITA); L 1-5	Zorz (SLO); L 3-5	Seitz (FRA); L 0-5	7	Did not advance					
Akram Bounabi	Individual sabre	Cavaliere (ITA); L 2-5	Pogu (FRA); L 2-5	Amer (EGY); L 0-5	A.Ferjani (TUN); L 0-5	Krajnc (SLO); L 1-5	—N/a	6	Did not advance					

Women

Athlete	Event	Group stage							Round of 16	Quarterfinal	Semifinal	Final / BM	
Athlete	Event	Opposition Score	Opposition Score	Opposition Score	Opposition Score	Opposition Score	Opposition Score	Rank	Opposition Score	Opposition Score	Opposition Score	Opposition Score	Rank
Leia Racha Malek	Individual épée	Rizzi (ITA); L 3-5	Vitalis (FRA); L 3-5	Mami (TUN); L 4-5	Ertürk (TUR); L 0-5	Grijak (SRB); L 1-5	—N/a	6	Did not advance				
Maroua Gueham	Individual épée	Marzani (ITA); L 1-5	Damjanoska (MKD); W 4-1	Abou Jaoude (LBN); L 1-2	Vanryssel (FRA); L 3-4	Günaç (TUR); L 0-5	—N/a	5	Rizzi (ITA); L 0-15	Did not advance			
Yousra Zeboudj	Individual épée	Louis-Marie (FRA); L 1-5	Calleja (ESP); L 1-5	Foietta (ITA); L 4-5	Mavrikiou (CYP); L 1-5	—N/a		5	Did not advance				
Chaima Nihal Guemmar	Individual foil	Karamete (TUR); L 0-5	Cipressa (ITA); L 0-5	Patru (FRA); L 2-5	Abou Jaoude (LBN); L 1-5	—N/a		5	Did not advance				
Meriem Mebarki	Individual foil	Escalona (ESP); L 1-5	Marechal (FRA); L 3-5	Calissi (ITA); L 1-5	Oliveira (POR); L 2-5	—N/a		5	Did not advance				
Sonia Zebboudj	Individual foil	Batini (ITA); L 2-5	Mariño (ESP); L 0-5	Recher (FRA); L 2-5	Isbir (TUR); L 1-5	—N/a		5	Did not advance				
Saoussen Boudiaf	Individual sabre	Shchukla (TUR); L 4-5	Aime (FRA); W 5-0	Gargano (ITA); W 5-4	Navarro (ESP); W 5-4	Mormile (ITA); W 5-2	—N/a	1	Bye	Shchukla (TUR); W 15-12	Gargano (ITA); W 15-11	Mormile (ITA); W 15-7	1st place, gold medalist(s)
Kaouther Mohamed Belkebir	Individual sabre	Kehli (ALG); W 5-3	Lembach (FRA); L 2-5	Daghfous (TUN); L 2-5	Portugués (ESP); L 3-5	Vongsavady (FRA); L 2-5	Passaro (ITA); L 3-5	6	Gargano (ITA); L 8-15	Did not advance			
Zohra Nora Kehli	Individual sabre	Belkebir (ALG); L 3-5	Passaro (ITA); W 5-3	Lembach (FRA); L 2-5	Daghfous (TUN); W 5-1	Portugués (ESP); L 4-5	Vongsavady (FRA); L 2-5	5	Passaro (ITA); L 13-15	Did not advance			

== Football ==
Summary

Team	Event	Group stage				Semifinal	Final / BM	
Team	Event	Opposition Score	Opposition Score	Opposition Score	Rank	Opposition Score	Opposition Score	Rank
Algeria U18 men's	Men's tournament	Spain; W 1–0	Morocco; L 0–2	France; L 2–3	3	Did not advance		

Team roster

The following is the Algeria squad in the men's football tournament of the 2022 Mediterranean Games. The team of 20 players was officially named on 14 June.

Head coach: (Algeria) Mourad Slatni

No.	Pos.	Player	Date of birth (age)	Caps	Goals	Club
1	GK	Chems Eddine Boumengouche	8 February 2004 (aged 18)	0	0	(Algerian Football Federation) Académie FAF
2	DF	Salah Eddine Zaoui	25 April 2004 (aged 18)	0	0	(Algerian Football Federation) Académie FAF
3	DF	Fouad Hanfoug	23 January 2004 (aged 18)	0	0	(Algerian Football Federation) CR Belouizdad
4	DF	Abdessamed Bounacer	11 December 2004 (aged 17)	0	0	(Algerian Football Federation) USM Alger
5	DF	Ouanis Bouzahzah	7 October 2004 (aged 17)	0	0	(Algerian Football Federation) Académie FAF
6	MF	Abdelghani Lallam	6 July 2004 (aged 17)	0	0	(Algerian Football Federation) Paradou AC
7	MF	Edhy Zuliani	11 August 2004 (aged 17)	0	0	(French Football Federation) Toulouse FC
8	DF	Mehdi Push Harrantz	20 January 2004 (aged 18)	0	0	(French Football Federation) AC Ajaccio
9	DF	Ivane Chegra	3 March 2004 (aged 18)	0	0	(French Football Federation) AC Ajaccio
10	FW	Mohamed Rafik Omar	10 January 2004 (aged 18)	0	0	(Algerian Football Federation) Académie FAF
11	DF	Adam Dougui	2 February 2004 (aged 18)	0	0	(The Football Association) Queens Park Rangers
12		Adam Ghyril Djadi	30 March 2004 (aged 18)	0	0	(French Football Federation) Bourg-en-Bresse
13	MF	Al Amin Aïd	30 September 2004 (aged 17)	0	0	(French Football Federation) Olympique Lyonnais
14	DF	Djibril Nottebaer	28 December 2004 (aged 17)	0	0	(French Football Federation) Amiens SC
15	FW	Lahlou Akhrib	24 April 2005 (aged 17)	0	0	(Algerian Football Federation) JS Kabylie
16	GK	Hamza Boualem	20 September 2004 (aged 17)	0	0	(Algerian Football Federation) USM Alger
17		Mahamed Islam Abdelkader	6 February 2004 (aged 18)	0	0	(Algerian Football Federation) Paradou AC
	FW	Mohamed Zaid Benmazouz		0	0	(Algerian Football Federation) USM Alger
	MF	Hamza Moulai		0	0	(Algerian Football Federation) Paradou AC
	MF	Brahim Bellas	13 March 2004 (aged 18)	0	0	(Algerian Football Federation) CR Belouizdad

Group play

Pos	Team	Pld	W	D	L	GF	GA	GD	Pts	Qualification
1	France	3	2	1	0	5	3	+2	7	Semifinals
2	Morocco	3	1	1	1	3	2	+1	4	Semifinals
3	Algeria (H)	3	1	0	2	3	5	−2	3	
4	Spain	3	0	2	1	2	3	−1	2	

Source: Oran 2022
(H) Hosts
26 June 2022
17:00

Spain	0–1	Algeria
	Report	Puch-Herrantz 27'

Abdelkrim Kerroum Stadium, Sig
Referee: Evangelos Manouchos (Greece)

28 June 2022
17:00

Algeria	0–2	Morocco
	Report	Boukhres 48'; Raihani 64'

Abdelkrim Kerroum Stadium, Sig
Referee: Amir Loucif (Tunisia)

30 June 2022
20:00

Algeria	2–3	France
Chegra 56' (pen.); Zaoui 79'	Report	Messoussa 8', 28'; Bouanani 81' (pen.)

Ahmed Zabana Stadium, Oran
Attendance: 40,000
Referee: Luca Pairetto (Italy)

== Gymnastics ==
=== Artistic ===
Men
Team

Athlete	Event	Final							
Athlete	Event	Apparatus						Total	Rank
Athlete	Event	F	PH	R	V	PB	HB	Total	Rank
Bilal Bellaoui	Team	12.850	—N/a	12.500	13.150	11.900	11.650	—N/a	
Mohamed Bourguieg	Team	11.200	10.200	12.550	13.700	12.700	12.050	—N/a	
H'mida Djaber	Team	11.400	11.600	12.200	12.950	12.350	9.550	—N/a	
Hillal Metidji	Team	12.050	12.950	12.500	13.850	13.400	12.750	—N/a	
Mohamed Yousfi	Team	—N/a	12.400	—N/a	—N/a	—N/a	—N/a	—N/a	
Total	Team	36.300	36.950	37.550	40.700	38.450	36.450	226.400	9

Individual

Athlete	Event	Qualification								Final							
Athlete	Event	Apparatus						Total	Rank	Apparatus						Total	Rank
Athlete	Event	F	PH	R	V	PB	HB	Total	Rank	F	PH	R	V	PB	HB	Total	Rank
Hillal Metidji	All-around	12.050	12.950	12.500	13.850	13.400	12.750	77.500	14	Did not advance							
Mohamed Bourguieg	All-around	11.200	10.200	12.550	13.700	12.700	12.050	72.400	24	Did not advance							
H'mida Djaber	All-around	11.400	11.600	12.200	12.950	12.350	9.550	70.050	28	Did not advance							

Women
Team

Athlete	Event	Final					
Athlete	Event	Apparatus				Total	Rank
Athlete	Event	V	UB	BB	F	Total	Rank
Fatima Boukhatem	Team	12.300	10.600	8.450	10.350	—N/a	
Sofia Nair	Team	—N/a	9.300	9.300	9.200	—N/a	
Lahna Salem	Team	12.500	11.250	9.250	10.300	—N/a	
Sihem Hamidi	Team	12.000	10.050	9.750	8.800	—N/a	
Total	Team	36.800	31.900	28.300	29.850	126.850	8

Individual

Athlete	Event	Qualification						Final					
Athlete	Event	Apparatus				Total	Rank	Apparatus				Total	Rank
Athlete	Event	V	UB	BB	F	Total	Rank	V	UB	BB	F	Total	Rank
Fatima Boukhatem	All-around	12.300	10.600	8.450	10.350	41.700	20 Q	0.000	10.500	8.533	10.133	29.166	16
Lahna Salem	All-around	12.500	11.250	9.250	10.300	43.300	18 ~~Q~~ WD	Did not advance					

== Handball ==
Summary

Team	Event	Group stage					Semifinal	Final / BM / Pl.	
Team	Event	Opposition Score	Opposition Score	Opposition Score	Opposition Score	Rank	Opposition Score	Opposition Score	Rank
Algeria men's	Men's tournament	Turkey; W 32–27	North Macedonia; D 24–24	Greece; W 25–35	Spain; L 19–31	3	Did not advance	Tunisia; L 35–39 (OT)	6
Algeria women's	Women's tournament	Spain; L 20–26	Croatia; L 21–31	Tunisia; L 19–20	—N/a	4	Did not advance	North Macedonia; L 23–31	8

=== Men's tournament ===
Team roster

The following is the Algerian roster in the men's handball tournament of the 2022 Mediterranean Games.

Head coach: Rabah Gherbi

No.	Pos.	Name	Date of birth (age)	Height	App.	Goals	Club
16	GK	Yahia Zemouchi	17 September 1994 (aged 27)	1.93 m	1	0	(Algeria) OM Annaba
22	GK	Khalifa Ghedbane	26 November 1996 (aged 25)	1.98 m	2	1	(Romania) Dinamo București
6	LB	Messaoud Berkous	20 July 1989 (aged 32)	1.92 m	2	9	(France) Istres Provence
26	LB	Mokhtar Kouri	29 February 1996 (aged 26)	1.94 m	2	1	(Kuwait) Al Nasr Club
87	RB	Ayoub Abdi	6 February 1997 (aged 25)	1.89 m	2	6	(France) Fenix Toulouse
77	LW	Réda Arib	22 October 1991 (aged 30)	1.86 m	2	6	(Algeria) MC Alger
15	RW	Redouane Saker	1 October 1991 (aged 30)	1.78 m	2	8	(Saudi Arabia) Al Taradji Club
18	PV	Hichem Kaabeche	12 March 1990 (aged 32)	1.92 m	2	1	(France) Villeurbanne
4	LB	Noureddine Hellal	23 May 1996 (aged 26)	1.86 m	2	3	(Libya) ?
2	LB	Zoheïr Naïm	3 May 1996 (aged 26)	1.88 m	2	4	(United Arab Emirates) Sharjah
94	PV	Bastien Khermouche	10 November 1993 (aged 28)	1.92 m	2	1	(France) Dijon Métropole
10	CB	Hamza Remili	12 March 1987 (aged 35)	1.78 m	1	0	(Algeria) CRB Baraki
3	LB	Nabil Chahbour	11 October 1996 (aged 25)	1. m	1	0	(Kuwait) Al Nasr Club
44	CB	Mustapha Hadj Sadok	17 August 1997 (aged 24)	1.87 m	2	4	(Switzerland) Pfadi Winterthur
36	CB	Abdelkader Rahim	12 July 1990 (aged 31)	1.90 m	2	4	(France) Dunkerque Handball
17	LB	Yacine Djedid	6 April 1997 (aged 25)	1. m	2	8	(Algeria) CRB Baraki

Group play

Pos	Team	Pld	W	D	L	GF	GA	GD	Pts	Qualification
1	Spain	4	4	0	0	154	81	+73	8	Semifinals
2	North Macedonia	4	2	1	1	116	98	+18	5	Semifinals
3	Algeria (H)	4	2	1	1	110	107	+3	5	Fifth place game
4	Turkey	4	1	0	3	96	135	−39	2	Seventh place game
5	Greece	4	0	0	4	93	148	−55	0	Ninth place game

Source: Oran 2022
Rules for classification: 1) Points; 2) Head-to-head points; 3) Head-to-head goal difference; 4) Head-to-head goals scored; 5) Goal difference; 6) Goals scored; 7) Draw.
(H) Hosts

27 June 2022; 18:00	Turkey	27–32	Algeria	24 February Indoor Hall, Arzew; Referees: Sá, Sá (POR)
27 June 2022; 18:00	Pehlivan 5	(14–15)	Berkous 6	24 February Indoor Hall, Arzew; Referees: Sá, Sá (POR)
27 June 2022; 18:00	5× (suspension) 2× (red card)	Report	1× (yellow card) 5× (suspension) 1× (red card)	24 February Indoor Hall, Arzew; Referees: Sá, Sá (POR)

28 June 2022; 18:00	Algeria	24–24	North Macedonia	24 February Indoor Hall, Arzew; Referees: Rodrigues, Pinherio (POR)
28 June 2022; 18:00	Saker 7	(15–15)	Serafimov 5	24 February Indoor Hall, Arzew; Referees: Rodrigues, Pinherio (POR)
28 June 2022; 18:00	5× (suspension) 1× (red card)	Report	2× (yellow card) 5× (suspension)	24 February Indoor Hall, Arzew; Referees: Rodrigues, Pinherio (POR)

30 June 2022; 19:00	Greece	25–35	Algeria	24 February Indoor Hall, Arzew; Referees: Díaz-Flores, Pérez (ESP)
30 June 2022; 19:00	Dikaioulias 4	(13–17)	Naïm 7	24 February Indoor Hall, Arzew; Referees: Díaz-Flores, Pérez (ESP)
30 June 2022; 19:00	4× (suspension)	Report	1× (yellow card) 2× (suspension)	24 February Indoor Hall, Arzew; Referees: Díaz-Flores, Pérez (ESP)

2 July 2022; 19:15	Algeria	19–31	Spain	24 February Indoor Hall, Arzew; Referees: Sá, Sá (POR)
2 July 2022; 19:15	Saker 4	(7–22)	Márquez 5	24 February Indoor Hall, Arzew; Referees: Sá, Sá (POR)
2 July 2022; 19:15	1× (yellow card) 2× (suspension)	Report	2× (suspension)	24 February Indoor Hall, Arzew; Referees: Sá, Sá (POR)

Fifth place game

4 July 2022
15:00
Tunisia
39–35 (ET)
Algeria
24 February Indoor Hall, Arzew
Referees: Ilievski, Ilievski (MKD)
Boughanmi 8
(13–12)
Naim 10
6× (suspension)
Report
6× (suspension)

FT: 26–26 ET: 5–5, 8–4

=== Women's tournament ===
Group play

Pos	Team	Pld	W	D	L	GF	GA	GD	Pts	Qualification
1	Spain	3	3	0	0	85	64	+21	6	Semifinals
2	Croatia	3	2	0	1	82	78	+4	4	Semifinals
3	Tunisia	3	1	0	2	67	75	−8	2	Fifth place game
4	Algeria (H)	3	0	0	3	60	77	−17	0	Seventh place game

Source: Oran 2022
Rules for classification: 1) Points; 2) Head-to-head points; 3) Head-to-head goal difference; 4) Head-to-head goals scored; 5) Goal difference; 6) Goals scored; 7) Draw.
(H) Hosts

30 June 2022; 17:15	Spain	26–20	Algeria	El Hachemí Hantaz Hall, Aïn El Turk; Referees: Ilievski, Ilievski (MKD)
30 June 2022; 17:15	Valdivia 7	(14–9)	five players 3	El Hachemí Hantaz Hall, Aïn El Turk; Referees: Ilievski, Ilievski (MKD)
30 June 2022; 17:15	1× (yellow card) 3× (suspension)	Report	3× (suspension)	El Hachemí Hantaz Hall, Aïn El Turk; Referees: Ilievski, Ilievski (MKD)

1 July 2022; 17:15	Algeria	21–31	Croatia	El Hachemí Hantaz Hall, Aïn El Turk; Referees: Sá, Sá (POR)
1 July 2022; 17:15	three players 4	(8–14)	Pavlović 9	El Hachemí Hantaz Hall, Aïn El Turk; Referees: Sá, Sá (POR)
1 July 2022; 17:15	1× (yellow card) 6× (suspension)	Report	1× (yellow card) 6× (suspension)	El Hachemí Hantaz Hall, Aïn El Turk; Referees: Sá, Sá (POR)

2 July 2022; 17:00	Algeria	19–20	Tunisia	El Hachemí Hantaz Hall, Aïn El Turk; Referees: Ilievski, Ilievski (MKD)
2 July 2022; 17:00	Makhloufi 7	(9–10)	Masri 7	El Hachemí Hantaz Hall, Aïn El Turk; Referees: Ilievski, Ilievski (MKD)
2 July 2022; 17:00	1× (yellow card) 5× (suspension)	Report	2× (yellow card) 6× (suspension)	El Hachemí Hantaz Hall, Aïn El Turk; Referees: Ilievski, Ilievski (MKD)

Seventh place game

4 July 2022; 10:00	Algeria	23–31	North Macedonia	El Hachemí Hantaz Hall, Aïn El Turk; Referees: Díaz-Flores, Pérez (ESP)
4 July 2022; 10:00	Zazai 7	(12–17)	Dukoska 10	El Hachemí Hantaz Hall, Aïn El Turk; Referees: Díaz-Flores, Pérez (ESP)
4 July 2022; 10:00	5× (suspension)	Report	3× (suspension)	El Hachemí Hantaz Hall, Aïn El Turk; Referees: Díaz-Flores, Pérez (ESP)

== Judo ==
Algeria competed in judo.

Men

Athlete	Event	Round of 16	Quarterfinals	Semifinals	Repechage 1	Repechage 2	Final / BM	
Athlete	Event	Opposition Result	Opposition Result	Opposition Result	Opposition Result	Opposition Result	Opposition Result	Rank
Bilal Yagoubi	60 kg	Korotzidis (CYP); W 10–00	Garrigós (ESP); L 00–10	—N/a		Akkuş (TUR); W 10–00	Samy (EGY); L 00–10	5
Rachid Cherrad	66 kg	Piras (ITA); L 00–10	Did not advance			Gaitero (ESP); L 01–10	Did not advance	
Messaoud Dris	73 kg	Çullhaj (ALB); W 11–00	Bayan (SYR); W 10–00	Gjakova (KOS); W	—N/a		Doukkali (MAR); W 10–01	1st place, gold medalist(s)
Aghiles Imad Benazoug	81 kg	Kullashi (KOS); W 10–00	Urquiza (ESP); L 00–10	Did not advance		Rodrigues (POR); L 00–01	Did not advance	
Abderrahmane Benamadi	90 kg	Bye	Miletić (BIH); L 00–10	Did not advance	Ben Ammar (TUN); W 10–00	Pirelli (ITA); L 00–10	Did not advance	
Mustapha Bouamar	100 kg	Bye	Kumrić (CRO); W 11–00	Kukolj (SRB); W 11–00	—N/a		Sherazadishvili (ESP); L 01–11	2nd place, silver medalist(s)
Mohamed Sofiane Belrekaa	+100 kg	Bye	Chelaru (ESP); W 10–00	Andreev (FRA); W 10–00	—N/a		Dragič (SLO); L 00–01	2nd place, silver medalist(s)

Women

Athlete	Event	Round of 16	Quarterfinals	Semifinals	Repechage	Final / BM	
Athlete	Event	Opposition Result	Opposition Result	Opposition Result	Opposition Result	Opposition Result	Rank
Imene Rezzoug	48 kg	Petitto (ITA); L 00–10	Did not advance		Bedioui (TUN); L 00–11	Did not advance	
Faïza Aissahine	52 kg	Štangar (SLO); W 01–00	Puljiz (CRO); L 00–10	Did not advance	Petrović (SRB); W 10–00	Box (ESP); L 00–10	5
Yamina Halata	57 kg	Bye	María Ruiz (ESP); W 10–00	Caggiano (ITA); L 00–01	—N/a	Samardžić (BIH); L 00–01	5
Amina Belkadi	63 kg	Bye	Turpin (FRA); W 01–00	Fazliu (KOS); L 00–01	—N/a	D'Isanto (ITA)	3rd place, bronze medalist(s)
Souad Bellakehal	70 kg	Samardžić (BIH); L 00–10	Did not advance				
Kaouthar Ouallal	78 kg	Bye	Peković (MNE); W 10–01	Buttigieg (FRA); L 00–10	Did not advance	Yılmaz (TUR); L 00–01	5
Sonia Asselah	+78 kg	Bye	Maranić (CRO); L 00–10	Did not advance	Žabić (SRB); L 00–10	Did not advance	

== Karate ==
Men

Athlete	Event	Round of 16	Quarterfinals	Semifinals	Repechage	Final / BM	
Athlete	Event	Opposition Result	Opposition Result	Opposition Result	Opposition Result	Opposition Result	Rank
Ala Salmi	−60 kg	Marinić (SLO); W 8–0	Meziane (FRA); W 2–1	Crescenzo (ITA); W 2–1	Bye	Şamdan (TUR); L 0–5	2nd place, silver medalist(s)
Fouad Benbara	−67 kg	Joksić (SRB); L 2–3	Did not advance				
Oussama Zaid	−75 kg	Loizides (CYP); W 5–0	Turulja (BIH); W 3–0	Eltemur (TUR); W 0–0	Bye	Abdelaziz (EGY); W 5–4	1st place, gold medalist(s)
Falleh Midoune	−84 kg	Brežančić (SRB); L 2–10	—N/a	—N/a	Makamata (FRA); W 8–0	Kvesić (CRO); L 2–8	5
Hocine Daikhi	+84 kg	Tešanović (SRB); W 7–2	Valente (POR); W 4–1	Sriti (MAR); W 7–1	Bye	Kvesić (CRO); L 1–2	2nd place, silver medalist(s)

Women

Athlete	Event	Round of 16	Quarterfinals	Semifinals	Repechage	Final / BM	
Athlete	Event	Opposition Result	Opposition Result	Opposition Result	Opposition Result	Opposition Result	Rank
Cylia Ouikene	−50 kg	Pinilla (ESP); W 0–0	Leal (POR); W 2–0	Haberl (SLO); W 1–0	Bye	Salama (EGY); W 5–0	1st place, gold medalist(s)
Louiza Abouriche	−55 kg	Hasani (CRO); W 4–2	Brunori (ITA); W 9–2	Gërvalla (KOS); W 7–0	Bye	Youssef (EGY); W 4–1	1st place, gold medalist(s)
Chaima Midi	−61 kg	Herver (AND); W 1–0	Stylianou (CYP); W 3–0	Mangiacapra (ITA); W 2–0	Bye	Mahjoub (TUN); W 3–2	1st place, gold medalist(s)
Karima Mekkaoui	−68 kg	Flamand (FRA); L 1–4	Did not advance				
Loubna Mekdas	+68 kg	Bye	Jemi (TUN); L 0–2	Did not advance			

== Sailing ==
Algeria competed in sailing.

Men

Athlete	Event	Race									Net points	Final rank
Athlete	Event	1	2	3	4	5	6	7	8	9	Net points	Final rank
Wassim Ziani	Laser Radial	21	16	17	14	4	16	16	19	(24)	123	19
Abdelkhalek Boussouar	Laser Radial	22	(29 BFD)	21	19	16	17	21	24	15	155	21

Athlete	Event	Race																		Net points	Final rank
Athlete	Event	1	2	3	4	5	6	7	8	9	10	11	12	13	14	15	16	17	18	Net points	Final rank
Ramzi Boujatit	iQFOiL	11	(15)	12	13	11	10	9	7	12	9	9	11	12	10	11	10	11	9	177	11
Rami Boudrouma	iQFOiL	13	(16)	13	15	12	14	11	11	13	11	11	14	11	15	12	12	13	10	211	13

Women

Athlete	Event	Race									Net points	Final rank
Athlete	Event	1	2	3	4	5	6	7	8	9	Net points	Final rank
Mallia Karassane	Laser Radial	15	16	10	13	18	16	(19)	16	12	116	17
Maissa Abdelfettah	Laser Radial	17	(20)	17	14	13	13	18	20	13	125	18

Athlete	Event	Race																	Net points	Final rank
Athlete	Event	1	2	3	4	5	6	7	8	9	10	11	12	13	14	15	16	17	Net points	Final rank
Nadjet Berrichi	iQFOiL	12	13	13	13	12	13	13	DNF 15	10	13	13	13	13	13	DNF 15	12	DNF 15	206	13
Katia Belabbas	iQFOiL	DNF 15	14	DNF 15	DNF 15	13	14	14	DNF 15	DNF 15	14	14	14	14	14	DNF 15	13	DNF 15	228	14

M = Medal race; EL = Eliminated – did not advance into the medal race

== Shooting ==
Algeria competed in shooting.

Men

Women

== Swimming ==
Men

Athlete	Event	Heat		Final	
Athlete	Event	Time	Rank	Time	Rank
Oussama Sahnoune	50 m freestyle	22.13	2 Q	22.22	3rd place, bronze medalist(s)
Mehdi Nazim Benbara	50 m freestyle	23.46	16	Did not advance	
Fares Benzidoun	100 m freestyle	52.48	17	Did not advance	
Mehdi Nazim Benbara	100 m freestyle	52.78	18	Did not advance	
Sofiane Achour Talet	200 m freestyle	1:53.94	12	Did not advance	
Mohamed Anisse Djaballah	200 m freestyle	1:53.69	11	Did not advance	
Mohamed Anisse Djaballah	400 m freestyle	4:03.41	11	Did not advance	
Lounis Khendriche	400 m freestyle	4:10.15	14	Did not advance	
Mohamed Anisse Djaballah	1500 m freestyle	16:11.93	10	Did not advance	
Youcef Bouzouia	50 m breaststroke	30.48	17	Did not advance	
Moncef Aymen Balamane	50 m breaststroke	28.90	12	Did not advance	
Moncef Aymen Balamane	100 m breaststroke	1:02.82	9	Did not advance	
Ramzi Chouchar	100 m breaststroke	1:05.91	17	Did not advance	
Ramzi Chouchar	200 m breaststroke	2:17.61	10	Did not advance	
Moncef Aymen Balamane	200 m breaststroke	2:20.03	11	Did not advance	
Mehdi Nazim Benbara	50 m backstroke	26.77	15	Did not advance	
Abdellah Ardjoune	50 m backstroke	25.98	11	Did not advance	
Abdellah Ardjoune	100 m backstroke	55.50	7 Q	55.82	8
Abdellah Ardjoune	200 m backstroke	2:04.18	13	Did not advance	
Jaouad Syoud	50 m butterfly	24.27	8 Q	24.15	8
Youcef Bouzouia	50 m butterfly	25.11	16	Did not advance	
Fares Benzidoun	100 m butterfly	57.90	17	Did not advance	
Jaouad Syoud	100 m butterfly	52.52	1 Q	52.38	2nd place, silver medalist(s)
Lounis Khendriche	200 m butterfly	2:05.88	9	Did not advance	
Jaouad Syoud	200 m butterfly	2:00.73	5 Q	1:58.37	3rd place, bronze medalist(s)
Ramzi Chouchar	200 m individual medley	2:07.10	13	Did not advance	
Jaouad Syoud	200 m individual medley	2:00.41	1 Q	1:58.83	1st place, gold medalist(s)
Ramzi Chouchar	400 m individual medley	4:27.52	6 Q	4:27.93	7
Jaouad Syoud	400 m individual medley	DNS		Did not advance	
Malachy Belkhelladi; Fares Benzidoun; Mehdi Nazim Benbara; Youcef Bouzouia	4×100 m freestyle relay	—N/a		DSQ	
Mohamed Anisse Djaballah; Sofiane Achour Talet; Lounis Khendriche; Fares Benzidoun	4×200 m freestyle relay	—N/a		7:40.10	4
Abdellah Ardjoune; Moncef Aymen Balamane; Fares Benzidoun; Mehdi Nazim Benbara	4×100 m medley relay	3:48.37	8 Q	3:46.25	8

Women

Athlete	Event	Heat		Final	
Athlete	Event	Time	Rank	Time	Rank
Amel Melih	50 m freestyle	25.85	9	Did not advance	
Nesrine Medjahed	50 m freestyle	26.15	14	Did not advance	
Amel Melih	100 m freestyle	DNS		Did not advance	
Nesrine Medjahed	100 m freestyle	58.00	15	Did not advance	
Lilia Sihem Midouni	400 m freestyle	4:43.40	13	Did not advance	
Hamida Rania Nefsi	200 m breaststroke	2:39.52	10	Did not advance	
Imène Kawthar Zitouni	50 m backstroke	31.03	15	Did not advance	
Amel Melih	50 m backstroke	29.67	11	Did not advance	
Imène Kawthar Zitouni	100 m backstroke	1:07.74	12	Did not advance	
Imène Kawthar Zitouni	200 m backstroke	2:21.88 NR	10	Did not advance	
Jihane Benchadli	200 m backstroke	2:24.17	11	Did not advance	
Amel Melih	50 m butterfly	27.59	13	Did not advance	
Nesrine Medjahed	50 m butterfly	28.44	16	Did not advance	
Lilia Sihem Midouni	100 m butterfly	1:05.53	13	Did not advance	
Lilia Sihem Midouni	200 m butterfly	2:26.44	13	Did not advance	
Jihane Benchadli	200 m butterfly	2:29.71	14	Did not advance	
Hamida Rania Nefsi	200 m individual medley	2:22.71	8 Q	2:22.77	8
Jihane Benchadli	200 m individual medley	2:24.24	9	Did not advance	
Hamida Rania Nefsi	400 m individual medley	5:01.05	10	Did not advance	
Imène Kawthar Zitouni	400 m individual medley	5:04.81	11	Did not advance	
Amel Melih; Nesrine Medjahed; Jihane Benchadli; Lilia Sihem Midouni	4×100 m freestyle relay	—N/a		3:53.20	8
Imène Kawthar Zitouni; Hamida Rania Nefsi; Nesrine Medjahed; Amel Melih	4×100 m medley relay	—N/a		4:20.78	7

== Volleyball ==
=== Men's tournament ===
Team roster

Head coach: Morad Sennoun

- 1 Ilyas Achouri L
- 2 Sofiane Bouyoucef MB
- 3 Ahmed Amir Kerboua S
- 6 Mohamed Amine Oumessad MB
- 7 Ali Kerboua WS
- 8 Boudjemaa Ikken OS
- 9 Abderraouf Hamimes S
- 11 Soufiane Hosni WS
- 16 Islem Ould Cherchali MB
- 17 Farouk Tizit WS
- 18 Billel Soualem WS
- 20 Youssouf Bourouba OS

Group B

Pos	Team	Pld	W	L	Pts	SW	SL	SR	SPW	SPL	SPR	Qualification
1	France	3	3	0	8	9	2	4.500	265	226	1.173	Final round
2	Turkey	3	1	2	4	5	6	0.833	230	253	0.909	Final round
3	Greece	3	1	2	3	5	8	0.625	286	285	1.004	Final round
4	Algeria	3	1	2	3	3	6	0.500	156	213	0.732	

Date	Time		Score		Set 1	Set 2	Set 3	Set 4	Set 5	Total	Report
26 Jun	20:00	Turkey	3–0	Algeria	25–22	25–23	25–23			75–68	Report
27 Jun	20:00	Algeria	0–3	France	18–25	18–25	16–25			52–75	Report
28 Jun	20:00	Greece	0–3	Algeria	24–26	20–25	19–25			63–76	Report

=== Women's tournament ===
Team roster

Head coach: Nabil Tennoun

- 1 Zina Mordjane Oudai S
- 3 Salima Hammouche L
- 5 Fahima Brahmi MB
- 6 Wissem Djouhri OS
- 7 Amira Bechar WS
- 8 Zohra Bensalem (C) WS
- 10 Melissa Soualmi OS
- 11 Yasmine Abderrahim WS
- 12 Kahina Djouhri MB
- 13 Radia Nadra Bellahsene S
- 14 Bekhta Rabah Mazari WS
- 15 Aicha Mezemate MB

Group C

Pos	Team	Pld	W	L	Pts	SW	SL	SR	SPW	SPL	SPR	Qualification
1	Turkey	3	3	0	9	9	2	4.500	267	199	1.342	Final round
2	Italy	3	2	1	6	7	3	2.333	239	189	1.265	Final round
3	Spain	3	1	2	3	4	6	0.667	207	240	0.863	Final round
4	Algeria	3	0	3	0	0	9	0.000	144	229	0.629	

Date	Time		Score		Set 1	Set 2	Set 3	Set 4	Set 5	Total	Report
26 Jun	21:00	Algeria	0–3	Turkey	16–25	4–25	13–25			33–75	Report
27 Jun	21:00	Spain	3–0	Algeria	25–23	29–27	25–18			79–68	Report
28 Jun	21:00	Italy	3–0	Algeria	25–11	25–14	25–18			75–43	Report

== Taekwondo ==
Men

Athlete	Event	Round of 32	Round of 16	Quarterfinals	Semifinals	Final	
Athlete	Event	Opposition Result	Opposition Result	Opposition Result	Opposition Result	Opposition Result	Rank
Saidi Attoui	58 kg	—N/a	Avramoski (MKD); W 34^{PTG}–14	Vicente (ESP); L 8–28^{PTG}	Did not advance		
Hani Tebib	68 kg	Alaphilippe (FRA); L 22–27	Did not advance				
Islam Guetfaya	80 kg	—N/a	Katoussi (TUN); L 5–26^{PTG}	Did not advance			
Abdelmalik Bendaikha	+80 kg	—N/a	Šegedin (BIH); L 6–18	Did not advance			

Women

Athlete	Event	Round of 16	Quarterfinals	Semifinals	Final	
Athlete	Event	Opposition Result	Opposition Result	Opposition Result	Opposition Result	Rank
Nada Baatouche	49 kg	Stanković (SRB); L 15–32	Did not advance			
Samia Zeggane	57 kg	Teggeri (CYP); L 6–26^{PTG}	Did not advance			
Racha Atamani	67 kg	Evci (TUR); L 6–17	Did not advance			
Assia Kadi	+67 kg	Bye	Kuş (TUR); L 0–20	Did not advance		

== Tennis ==
Men

Athlete	Event	Round of 32	Round of 16	Quarterfinals	Semifinals	Final / BM	
Athlete	Event	Opposition Score	Opposition Score	Opposition Score	Opposition Score	Opposition Score	Rank
Toufk Sahtali	Singles	Maamoun (EGY); L 3–6, 6–7	Did not advance				
Youcef Rihane	Singles	Kirci (TUR); L 3–6, 2–6	Did not advance				
Samir Hamza Reguig; Youcef Rihane	Doubles	Dominko; Premzl (SLO); L 6–3, 4–6, 8–10	Did not advance				

Women

Athlete	Event	Round of 32	Round of 16	Quarterfinals	Semifinals	Final / BM	
Athlete	Event	Opposition Score	Opposition Score	Opposition Score	Opposition Score	Opposition Score	Rank
Amira Benaissa	Singles	Fonte (POR); W 5–7, 7–6, 6–4	Maristany (ESP); L 2–6, 2–6	Did not advance			
Inès Ibbou	Singles		Kabbaj (MAR); L 2–6, 4–6	Did not advance			
Ines Bekrar; Inès Ibbou	Doubles	—N/a	Alves Campino; Fonte (POR); W 6–3, 6–2	Bouzas Maneiro; Maristany (ESP); L 5–7, 3–6	Did not advance		

== Weightlifting ==
Men

Athlete	Event	Snatch		Clean & jerk	
Athlete	Event	Result	Rank	Result	Rank
Abdelkader Ainouazane	61 kg	—	—	135	5
Samir Farjallah	73 kg	141	6	171	4
Faris Touairi	89 kg	161	3rd place, bronze medalist(s)	—	—
Aymen Touairi	102 kg	192	4	206	5
Walid Bidani	+102 kg	202	1st place, gold medalist(s)	235	2nd place, silver medalist(s)

Women

Athlete	Event	Snatch		Clean & jerk	
Athlete	Event	Result	Rank	Result	Rank
Nadia Katbi	49 kg	57	5	65	5
Fatima Zohra Laghouati	59 kg	76	9	100	7
Maghnia Hammadi	71 kg	100	2nd place, silver medalist(s)	121	3rd place, bronze medalist(s)

== Wrestling ==
Key:

- VT (ranking points: 5–0 or 0–5) – Victory by fall.
- VB (ranking points: 5–0 or 0–5) – Victory by injury (VF for forfeit, VA for withdrawal or disqualification)
- PP (ranking points: 3–1 or 1–3) – Decision by points – the loser with technical points.
- PO (ranking points: 3–0 or 0–3) – Decision by points – the loser without technical points.
- ST (ranking points: 4–0 or 0–4) – Great superiority – the loser without technical points and a margin of victory of at least 8 (Greco-Roman) or 10 (freestyle) points.
- SP (ranking points: 4–1 or 1–4) – Technical superiority – the loser with technical points and a margin of victory of at least 8 (Greco-Roman) or 10 (freestyle) points.

Men's Freestyle

Athlete	Event	Round of 16	Quarterfinal	Semifinal	Repechage	Final / BM	
Athlete	Event	Opposition Result	Opposition Result	Opposition Result	Opposition Result	Opposition Result	Rank
Abdelhak Kherbache	65 kg	Crespo (ESP); W 2–2	Dirki (SYR); W 6–5	Hafez (EGY); L 9–5	—N/a	Egorov (MKD); L 2–7	5
Abdelkader Ikkal	74 kg	—N/a	Vejseli (MKD); W 3–2	Samet Ak (TUR); L 2–7	—N/a	Dudaev (ALB); L 0–8	5
Fateh Benferdjallah	86 kg	Bye	Caneva (ITA); L 5–1	Amine (SMR); L 0–10	Bye	Aibuev (FRA); L 0–10	5
Muhammed Bilal Khalil	125 kg	Bye	Nurasulov (SRB); L 0–10	—N/a		Salim (TUR); L 0–10	5

Athlete	Event	Round Robin				Semifinal	Final / BM	
Athlete	Event	Opposition Result	Opposition Result	Opposition Result	Rank	Opposition Result	Opposition Result	Rank
Salaheddine Kateb	57 kg	Karavuş (TUR); L 0–6	Vartanov (ESP); L 3–3 VP	—N/a	3	Did not advance		
Mohammed Fardj	97 kg	Nurov (MKD); L 0–10	Saadaoui (TUN); L 3–5	Pancorbo (ESP); L 0–4	4	Did not advance		

Women's Freestyle

Athlete	Event	Round Robin				Semifinal	Final / BM	
Athlete	Event	Opposition Result	Opposition Result	Opposition Result	Rank	Opposition Result	Opposition Result	Rank
Ibtissem Doudou	50 kg	Demirhan (TUR); L 0–6	Liuzzi (ITA); L 3–3	Goñi (ESP); L 2–8	4	Did not advance		
Rayane Houfaf	57 kg	Gün (TUR); L 0–3	Salah (FRA); L 0–7	Hussein (EGY); W 2–0	3	Did not advance		
Mastoura Soudani	62 kg	Amri (TUN); L 0–10	Esposito (ITA); W 2–0	—N/a	2	Douarre (FRA); L 3–9	Pérez (ESP); L 11–13	5
Thelleli Merzouk	68 kg	Tosun (TUR); L 0–10	Lecarpentier (FRA); L 0–12	—N/a	3	Did not advance		

Athlete	Event	Quarterfinal	Semifinal	Final / BM	
Athlete	Event	Opposition Result	Opposition Result	Opposition Result	Rank
Lamia Chemlal	53 kg	Shaimaa (EGY); L 6–8	Did not advance		
Hadil Boughezal	76 kg	Celda (ESP); L 1–11	Did not advance		

Men's Greco-Roman

Athlete	Event	Round of 16	Quarterfinal	Semifinal	Repechage	Final / BM	
Athlete	Event	Opposition Result	Opposition Result	Opposition Result	Opposition Result	Opposition Result	Rank
Abdeldjebar Djebbari	60 kg	Bye	Lizatović (CRO); L WO	Did not advance			
Ishak Ghaiou	67 kg	—N/a	Oliveira (POR); W 8–0	Abdelrahman (EGY); W 3–1	—N/a	Fırat (TUR); L 6–7	2nd place, silver medalist(s)
Abdelkrim Ouakali	77 kg	Mejias (ESP); W 10–2	Russo (ITA); W 8^{F}–0	Kamenjašević (CRO); W 12–3	Bye	Nemeš (SRB); L 0–9	2nd place, silver medalist(s)
Bachir Sid Azara	87 kg	—N/a	Bur (FRA); W 3–0	Cengiz (TUR); W 4–0	—N/a	Minguzzi (ITA); W 5–0	1st place, gold medalist(s)
		Group #1	Group #2				
Hichem Kouchit	130 kg	Guennichi (TUN); L 1-5	Varicelli (ITA); W 9-0	Yıldırım (TUR); L 0-8	Bye	Guennichi (TUN); L 0-8	4
