= Boxing at the 2022 Mediterranean Games – Men's flyweight =

Boxing competitions

Men's flyweight boxing at the 2022 Mediterranean Games
- Venue: EMEC Hall
- Date: 27 June – 1 July
- Competitors: 11 from 11 nations

Medalists
| gold medal | Federico Serra | Italy |
| silver medal | Said Mortaji | Morocco |
| bronze medal | Samet Gümüş | Turkey |
| bronze medal | Omer Ametović | Serbia |

The men's flyweight competition of the boxing events at the 2022 Mediterranean Games in Oran, Algeria, was held from 27 June to 1 July at the EMEC Hall.

Like all Mediterranean Games boxing events, the competition was a straight single-elimination tournament. Both semifinal losers were awarded bronze medals, so no boxers competed again after their first loss.

== Results ==
Round of 16
Ahmed Ismail (EGY) | 0
Martín Molina (ESP) | 2
Haris Aganović (BIH)
Ibrahim Boukedim (FRA) | RSC
Omer Ametović (SRB) | 2
Yassine Touareg (ALG) | 1

Quarterfinals
Federico Serra (ITA) | 2
Martín Molina (ESP) | 1
Samet Gümüş (TUR) | 3
Bashkim Bajoku (KOS) | 0
Said Mortaji (MAR) | 2
Ibrahim Boukedim (FRA) | 1
Omer Ametović (SRB) | 3
Mehdi Hajri (TUN) | 0

Semifinals
Federico Serra (ITA) | 3
Samet Gümüş (TUR) | 0
Said Mortaji (MAR) | WO
Omer Ametović (SRB)

Final
Federico Serra (ITA) | RSC
Said Mortaji (MAR)
