= Boxing at the 2022 Mediterranean Games – Women's light welterweight =

Boxing competitions

Women's light welterweight at the 2022 Mediterranean Games
- Venue: EMEC Hall
- Date: 27 June – 1 July
- Competitors: 6 from 6 nations

Medalists
gold medal	Imane Khelif	Algeria
silver medal	Assunta Canfora	Italy
bronze medal	Gizem Özer	Turkey
bronze medal	Thaïs Larché	France

The women's light welterweight competition of the boxing events at the 2022 Mediterranean Games in Oran, Algeria, was held from 27 June to 1 July at the EMEC Hall.

Like all Mediterranean Games boxing events, the competition was a straight single-elimination tournament. Both semifinal losers were awarded bronze medals, so no boxers competed again after their first loss.

== Results ==
Quarterfinals
Imane Khelif (ALG)	RSC
Rahma Mohamed (EGY)
Thaïs Larché (FRA)	3
Tara Bohatjuk (BIH)	0

Semifinals
Gizem Özer (TUR)	0
Imane Khelif (ALG)	3
Thaïs Larché (FRA)	0
Assunta Canfora (ITA)	3

Final
Imane Khelif (ALG)	3
Assunta Canfora (ITA)	0
