= Wrestling at the 2022 Mediterranean Games – Men's Greco-Roman 77 kg =

Wrestling competitions

Men's Greco-Roman 77 kg at the 2022 Mediterranean Games
- Venue: EMEC Hall
- Date: 26–27 June
- Competitors: 13 from 13 nations

Medalists
gold medal	Viktor Nemeš	Serbia
silver medal	Abdelkrim Ouakali	Algeria
bronze medal	Antonio Kamenjašević	Croatia
bronze medal	Georgios Prevolarakis	Greece

The Men's Greco-Roman 77 kg competition of the wrestling events at the 2022 Mediterranean Games in Oran, Algeria, was held from 26 June to 27 June at the EMEC Hall.

== Results ==
Legend

- F — Won by fall

Round of 16
Marcos Sánchez-Silva (ESP)	2
Abdelkrim Ouakali (ALG)	10
Georgios Prevolarakis (GRE)	3
Ahmet Yılmaz (TUR)	3
Lamjed Maafi (TUN)	5
Ibrahim Ghanem (FRA)	3
Kevin Kupi (ALB)	10
Luka Gumilar (SLO)	0
Viktor Nemeš (SRB)	9
Emad Abouelatta (EGY)	0

Quarterfinals
Mohamad Al-Obeid (SYR)	0
Antonio Kamenjašević (CRO)	9
Ciro Russo (ITA)	0
Abdelkrim Ouakali (ALG)	8^{F}
Georgios Prevolarakis (GRE)	14
Lamjed Maafi (TUN)	4
Kevin Kupi (ALB)	1
Viktor Nemeš (SRB)	10

Semifinals
Antonio Kamenjašević (CRO)	3
Abdelkrim Ouakali (ALG)	12
Georgios Prevolarakis (GRE)	0
Viktor Nemeš (SRB)	9

Final
Abdelkrim Ouakali (ALG)	0
Viktor Nemeš (SRB)	9

Repechage round 1
Marcos Sánchez-Silva (ESP)	1
Ciro Russo (ITA)	6
Emad Abouelatta (EGY)	9
Kevin Kupi (ALB)	0

Bronze medals
Ciro Russo (ITA)	1
Antonio Kamenjašević (CRO)	3
Emad Abouelatta (EGY)	3
Georgios Prevolarakis (GRE)	3
