= Serbia at the 2022 Mediterranean Games =

- IOC code: SRB
- NOC: Olympic Committee of Serbia
- Competitors: 160 in 21 sports
- Flag bearer: Damir Mikec
- Medals Ranked 7th: Gold 13 Silver 7 Bronze 11 Total 31

Mediterranean Games appearances (overview)
- 2009; 2013; 2018; 2022; 2026

Other related appearances
- Yugoslavia (1951–1991); Serbia and Montenegro (1997–2005); Kosovo (2018–pres.)

Serbia competed at the 2022 Mediterranean Games in Oran, Algeria over 11 days from 25 June to 6 July 2022.

== Medalists ==
Medal	Name	Sport	Event	Date
Gold	Viktor Nemeš	Wrestling	Greco-Roman 77 kg	27 June
Gold	Magomedgadzhi Nurasulov	Wrestling	Freestyle 125 kg	28 June
Gold	Damir Mikec; Zorana Arunović	Shooting	10 m air pistol team	29 June
Gold	Marica Perišić	Judo	Women's 57 kg	29 June
Gold	Milenko Sebić	Shooting	10 m air rifle man	30 June
Gold	Serbia men's national water polo team: Petar Pajković; Mitar Maraš; Marko Dimitrijević; Bogdan Gavrilović; Nikola Kojić; Vuk Anđelić; Zoran Poznanović; Viktor Urošević; Aleksandar Kovačević; Bogdan Brešćanski; Petar Stanić; Nikola Vuk Radulović; Radosav Virijević	Water polo	Men's tournament	30 June
Gold	Armin Sinančević	Athletics	Shot put	30 June
Gold	Damir Mikec	Shooting	10 m air pistol men	1 July
Gold	Milica Gardašević	Athletics	Long jump	1 July
Gold	Vladimir Mironchikov	Boxing	Men's 81 kg	1 July
Gold	Adriana Vilagoš	Athletics	Javelin throw	2 July
Gold	Nina Stanisavljević	Swimming	50 m backstroke	3 July
Gold	Veljko Ćuk	Fencing	Men's foil	5 July
Silver	Vladimir Brežančić	Karate	Men's 84 kg	27 June
Silver	Milica Nikolić	Judo	Women's 48 kg	29 June
Silver	Asmir Kolašinac	Athletics	Shot put	30 June
Silver	Teodora Vukojević	Shooting	10 m air rifle women	1 July
Silver	Lazar Kovačević; Andrea Arsović	Shooting	10 m air rifle mixed team	2 July
Silver	Lazar Anić	Athletics	Long jump	3 July
Silver	Serbia men's national 3x3 team: Nemanja Stanković; Stefan Momirov; Nikola Kovačević; Miloš Antić	Basketball	Men's tournament	3 July
Bronze	Marija Sudimac; Sara Lončar	Badminton	Women's doubles	27 June
Bronze	Stevan Mićić	Wrestling	Freestyle 65 kg	28 June
Bronze	Strahinja Bunčić	Judo	Men's 66 kg	29 June
Bronze	Dejan Kovačević	Boules	Men's precision shooting	29 June
Bronze	Ognjen Ilić	Cycling	Men's road time trial	30 June
Bronze	Omer Ametović	Boxing	Men's 52 kg	30 June
Bronze	Aleksandar Kukolj	Judo	Men's 100 kg	1 July
Bronze	Zorana Arunović	Shooting	10 m air pistol women	2 July
Bronze	Serbia women's national volleyball team: Tara Taubner; Andrea Tišma; Minja Osmajić; Bojana Gočanin; Jovana Cvetković; Hena Kurtagić; Ana Malešević; Vanja Savić; Isidora Kockarević; Branka Tica; Vanja Ivanović; Rada Perović	Volleyball	Women's tournament	4 July
Bronze	Serbia women's national handball team: Marija Simić; Dunja Radević; Lana Mijailović; Nataša Ćetković; Una Obrenović; Aleksandra Vukajlović; Helena Indić; Srna Sukur; Isidora Bogunović; Jelena Đurašinović; Marija Jovanović; Edita Nuković; Teodora Veličković; Jovana Jovović; Dunja Tabak; Katarina Bojičić	Handball	Women's tournament	6 July
Bronze	Serbia men's national handball team: Milan Bomaštar; Vukašin Vorkapić; Milan Milić; Uroš Borzaš; Todor Jandrić; Andrej Trnavac; Uroš Kojadinović; Uroš Pavlović; Milan Golubović; Veljko Popović; Marko Vignjević; Mladen Šotić; Stefan Petrić; Ivan Popović; Marko Milosavljević; Miloš Grozdanić	Handball	Men's tournament	6 July

Medals by sport
Sport	1st place, gold medalist(s)	2nd place, silver medalist(s)	3rd place, bronze medalist(s)	Total
Athletics	3	2	0	5
Badminton	0	0	1	1
Basketball	0	1	0	1
Boules	0	0	1	1
Boxing	1	0	1	2
Cycling	0	0	1	1
Fencing	1	0	0	1
Handball	0	0	2	2
Judo	1	1	2	4
Karate	0	1	0	1
Shooting	3	2	1	6
Swimming	1	0	0	1
Volleyball	0	0	1	1
Water polo	1	0	0	1
Wrestling	2	0	1	3
Total	13	7	11	31

== Archery ==
Men

Athlete	Event	Ranking round		Round of 64	Round of 32	Round of 16	Quarterfinals	Semifinals	Final / BM	
Athlete	Event	Score	Seed	Opposition Score	Opposition Score	Opposition Score	Opposition Score	Opposition Score	Opposition Score	Rank
Mihajlo Stefanović	Individual	631	16	Bye	Muhammed Yildirmis (TUR); W 6–2	Mete Gazoz (TUR); L 2–6	Did not advance			

Women

Athlete	Event	Ranking round		Round of 32	Round of 16	Quarterfinals	Semifinals	Final / BM	
Athlete	Event	Score	Seed	Opposition Score	Opposition Score	Opposition Score	Opposition Score	Opposition Score	Rank
Anja Brkić	Individual	545	25	Leyre Fernandez Infante (ESP); L 1–7	Did not advance				

Team

Athlete	Event	Ranking round		Round of 16	Quarterfinals	Semifinals	Final / BM	
Athlete	Event	Score	Seed	Opposition Score	Opposition Score	Opposition Score	Opposition Score	Rank
Anja Brkić; Mihajlo Stefanović	Mixed	1176	11	Greece; L 2–6	Did not advance			

== Artistic gymnastics ==
Men

Athlete	Event	Qualification								Final							
Athlete	Event	Apparatus						Total	Rank	Apparatus						Total	Rank
Athlete	Event	F	PH	R	V	PB	HB	Total	Rank	F	PH	R	V	PB	HB	Total	Rank
Ivan Dejanović	All-around	0.000	0.000	0.000	0.000	0.000	12.200	12.200	56	Did not advance							
Petar Vefić	All-around	9.850	11.600	12.400	12.700	12.850	11.500	70.900	28 Q	12.950	12.000	12.450	12.650	12.050	11.300	73.400	18

== Athletics ==
Serbia competed in athletics.

Key

- Note – Ranks given for track events are within the athlete's heat only
- Q = Qualified for the next round
- q = Qualified for the next round as a fastest loser or, in field events, by position without achieving the qualifying target
- NR = National record
- N/A = Round not applicable for the event
- Bye = Athlete not required to compete in round

Men
Track & road events

Athlete	Event	Semifinal		Final	
Athlete	Event	Result	Rank	Result	Rank
Elzan Bibić	1500 m	—N/a		3:45.42	10
Jovan Čanak	110 m hurdles	Did not start			

Field events

Athlete	Event	Final	
Athlete	Event	Result	Rank
Lazar Anić	Long jump	7.83	2nd place, silver medalist(s)
Armin Sinančević	Shot put	21.29	1st place, gold medalist(s)
Asmir Kolašinac	Shot put	20.37	2nd place, silver medalist(s)

Women
Track & road events

Athlete	Event	Semifinal		Final	
Athlete	Event	Result	Rank	Result	Rank
Ivana Ilić	100 m	11.82	9	Did not advance	
Ivana Ilić	200 m	24.39	9	Did not advance	
Tamara Milutinović	200 m	24.48	10	Did not advance	
Anja Lukić	110 m hurdles	13.26	6 q	13.40	5

Field events

Athlete	Event	Final	
Athlete	Event	Distance	Position
Milica Gardašević	Long jump	6.67	1st place, gold medalist(s)
Adriana Vilagoš	Javelin throw	60.22	1st place, gold medalist(s)

== Badminton ==
Serbia competed in badminton.

Women

Athlete	Event	Round of 32	Round of 16	Quarterfinal	Semifinal	Final / BM	
Athlete	Event	Opposition Score	Opposition Score	Opposition Score	Opposition Score	Opposition Score	Rank
Sara Lončar	Women's singles	Bye	Katharina Fink (ITA); L (w/o)	Did not advance			
Marija Sudimac	Women's singles	Theodora Lamprianidou (GRE); W (21–9, 21–16)	Da Cunha Goncalves (POR); W (21–11, 21–8)	Doha Hany (EGY); L (21–16, 19–21, 16–21)	Did not advance		
Sara Lončar; Marija Sudimac	Women's doubles	—N/a	Grammatoula Sotiriou / Theodora Lamprianidou (GRE); W (21–10, 21–14)	Doha Hany / Nour Youssri (EGY); W (21–15, 21–12)	Bengisu Erçetin / Nazlıcan İnci (TUR); L (10–21, 11–21)	Did not advance	3rd place, bronze medalist(s)

== Basketball 3x3 ==
Athlete	Event	Group matches			Quarterfinals	Semifinals	Final / BM	
Athlete	Event	Opposition Score	Opposition Score	Rank	Opposition Score	Opposition Score	Opposition Score	Rank
Nemanja Stanković; Stefan Momirov; Nikola Kovačević; Miloš Antić	Men's Tournament	(Cyprus) Cyprus; W 19–16	(France) France; W 21–16	1 Q	(Croatia) Croatia; W 17–14	(Spain) Spain; W 21–13	(France) France; L 13–19	2nd place, silver medalist(s)
Nina Tešić; Lena Radulović; Tijana Jelić; Ivana Curaković	Women's Tournament	(Algeria) Algeria; W 11–7	(Portugal) Portugal; W 14–11	1 Q	(Italy) Italy; L 11–17	Did not advance		

== Boules ==
Lyonnaise

Athlete	Event	Preliminary round				Quarterfinals	Semifinals	Final / BM	
Athlete	Event	Round 1	Rank	Round 2	Rank	Opposition Score	Opposition Score	Opposition Score	Rank
Milica Popović	Women's precision throw	6	7	12	=8	Did not advance			
Dejan Kovačević	Men's precision throw	23	1	22	2Q	Rayen Hamdi (TUN); W 13-4	Luigi Grattapaglia (ITA); L 12-23	Sid Ahmed Boufateh (ALG); W 11-8	3rd place, bronze medalist(s)

== Boxing ==
Men

Athlete	Event	Round of 16	Quarterfinals	Semifinals	Final	
Athlete	Event	Opposition Result	Opposition Result	Opposition Result	Opposition Result	Rank
Omer Ametović	Flyweight	Mohamed Yassine Touareg (ALG); W 2-1	Mehdi Hajri (TUN); W 3-0	Said Mortaji (MAR); L W/O	Did not advance	3rd place, bronze medalist(s)
Nazif Sejdi	Lightweight	—N/a	Mohamed Hamout (MAR); L 0- 3	Did not advance		
Semiz Aličić	Light welterweight	—N/a	Abdelhag Nadir (MAR); L 0-3	Did not advance		
Almir Memić	Middleweight	Ali Hashem (LBN); W RSC	Ahmed Ghousoon (SYR); L 1-2	Did not advance		
Vladimir Mironchikov	Light heavyweight	—N/a	Kaan Aykutsun (TUR); W 3-0	Gazimagomed Jalidov Gafurova (ESP); W 3-0	Mohammed Houmri (ALG); W 2-1	1st place, gold medalist(s)

Women

Athlete	Event	Round of 16	Quarterfinals	Semifinals	Final	
Athlete	Event	Opposition Result	Opposition Result	Opposition Result	Opposition Result	Rank
Nikolina Gajić	Welterweight	—N/a	Busenaz Surmeneli (TUR); L RSC	Did not advance		

== Cycling ==
Serbia competed in cycling.

Men

Athlete	Event	Time	Rank
Đorđe Đurić	Road race	3:12:28	6
Dušan Rajović	Road race	3:15:34	24
Veljko Stojnić	Road race	3:14:02	15
Ognjen Ilić	Time trial	32:19.63	3rd place, bronze medalist(s)

Women

Athlete	Event	Time	Rank
Jelena Erić	Road race	Did not start	

== Fencing ==
Serbia competed in fencing.

Men

Athlete	Event	Group stage						Round of 16	Quarterfinal	Semifinal	Final / BM	
Athlete	Event	Opposition Score	Opposition Score	Opposition Score	Opposition Score	Opposition Score	Rank	Opposition Score	Opposition Score	Opposition Score	Opposition Score	Rank
Veljko Ćuk	Individual foil	Abouelkassem (EGY); W 5–4	Bianchi (ITA); W 5–2	Tofalides (CYP); W 5–3	Heroui (ALG); W 5–2	Ediri (FRA); W 5–4	1 Q	Macedo (POR); W 15–4	Aboelkasem (EGY); W 15–13	Filippi (ITA); W 15–10	Llavador (ESP); W 15–9	1st place, gold medalist(s)

Women

Athlete	Event	Group stage						Round of 16	Quarterfinal	Semifinal	Final / BM	
Athlete	Event	Opposition Score	Opposition Score	Opposition Score	Opposition Score	Opposition Score	Rank	Opposition Score	Opposition Score	Opposition Score	Opposition Score	Rank
Jana Grijak	Individual épée	Mami (TUN); W 5–0	Ertürk (TUR); W 5–4	Vitalis (FRA); L 4–5	Rizzi (ITA); L 3–5	Malek (ALG); W 5–4	3 Q	Ertürk (TUR); W 15–10	Marzani (ITA); L 8–15	Did not advance		

== Handball ==
Summary

Team	Event	Group stage					Semifinal	Final / BM / Pl.	
Team	Event	Opposition Score	Opposition Score	Opposition Score	Opposition Score	Rank	Opposition Score	Opposition Score	Rank
Serbia men's	Men's tournament	Slovenia; W 31–27	Egypt; L 28–35	Italy; W 34–33	Tunisia; W 35–29	2 Q	Spain; L 38–42	North Macedonia; W 34–29	3rd place, bronze medalist(s)
Serbia women's	Women's tournament	Portugal; W 21–20	North Macedonia; W 26–18	Turkey; W 31–26	—N/a	1 Q	Croatia; L 20–31	Portugal; W 26–22	3rd place, bronze medalist(s)

=== Men's tournament ===
Squad

- Milan Bomaštar
- Vukašin Vorkapić
- Milan Milić
- Uroš Borzaš
- Todor Jandrić
- Andrej Trnavac
- Uroš Kojadinović
- Uroš Pavlović
- Milan Golubović
- Veljko Popović
- Marko Vignjević
- Mladen Šotić
- Stefan Petrić
- Ivan Popović
- Marko Milosavljević
- Miloš Grozdanić

Group play

Pos	Team	Pld	W	D	L	GF	GA	GD	Pts	Qualification
1	Egypt	4	4	0	0	113	89	+24	8	Semifinals
2	Serbia	4	3	0	1	107	97	+10	6	Semifinals
3	Tunisia	4	2	0	2	99	94	+5	4	Fifth place game
4	Italy	4	1	0	3	107	106	+1	2	Seventh place game
5	Slovenia (Note: Slovenia withdrew from the tournament due to several positive COVID-19 cases. The matches were counted as a 10–0 win for the opposing team.)	4	0	0	4	0	40	−40	0	Ninth place game

Source: Oran 2022
Rules for classification: 1) Points; 2) Head-to-head points; 3) Head-to-head goal difference; 4) Head-to-head goals scored; 5) Goal difference; 6) Goals scored; 7) Draw.
Notes:

27 June 2022; 14:00	Slovenia	0–10 (27–31)	Serbia	24 February Indoor Hall, Arzew; Referees: Deche, Guarda (ALG)
27 June 2022; 14:00	Pipp 5	(15–15)	Grozdanić 8	24 February Indoor Hall, Arzew; Referees: Deche, Guarda (ALG)
27 June 2022; 14:00	1× (yellow card) 2× (suspension)	Report	2× (yellow card) 9× (suspension) 1× (red card)	24 February Indoor Hall, Arzew; Referees: Deche, Guarda (ALG)

28 June 2022; 14:00	Serbia	28–35	Egypt	24 February Indoor Hall, Arzew; Referees: Sá, Sá (POR)
28 June 2022; 14:00	Grozdanić 7	(12–16)	El-Ahmar 6	24 February Indoor Hall, Arzew; Referees: Sá, Sá (POR)
28 June 2022; 14:00	2× (yellow card) 6× (suspension)	Report	3× (suspension) 1×	24 February Indoor Hall, Arzew; Referees: Sá, Sá (POR)

30 June 2022; 14:00	Italy	33–34	Serbia	24 February Indoor Hall, Arzew; Referees: Ghoul, Chergui (ALG)
30 June 2022; 14:00	Arcieri 7	(16–15)	Milić 8	24 February Indoor Hall, Arzew; Referees: Ghoul, Chergui (ALG)
30 June 2022; 14:00	1× (suspension)	Report	2× (yellow card) 6× (suspension) 1× (red card)	24 February Indoor Hall, Arzew; Referees: Ghoul, Chergui (ALG)

2 July 2022; 14:15	Serbia	35–29	Tunisia	24 February Indoor Hall, Arzew; Referees: Díaz-Flores, Pérez (ESP)
2 July 2022; 14:15	Vorkapić 7	(19–13)	Rzig 8	24 February Indoor Hall, Arzew; Referees: Díaz-Flores, Pérez (ESP)
2 July 2022; 14:15	1× (yellow card) 3× (suspension)	Report	1× (yellow card) 4× (suspension)	24 February Indoor Hall, Arzew; Referees: Díaz-Flores, Pérez (ESP)

Semifinal

4 July 2022; 18:00	Spain	42–38	Serbia	Miloud Hadefi Complex Omnisport Arena, Bir El Djir; Referees: Belkhiri, Hamidi (ALG)
4 July 2022; 18:00	three players 6	(22–21)	three players 7	Miloud Hadefi Complex Omnisport Arena, Bir El Djir; Referees: Belkhiri, Hamidi (ALG)
4 July 2022; 18:00	1× (yellow card) 1× (suspension)	Report	2× (yellow card) 5× (suspension)	Miloud Hadefi Complex Omnisport Arena, Bir El Djir; Referees: Belkhiri, Hamidi (ALG)

Bronze medal game

6 July 2022; 11:30	North Macedonia	29–34	Serbia	Miloud Hadefi Complex Omnisport Arena, Bir El Djir; Referees: Deche, Ghouarda (ALG)
6 July 2022; 11:30	Pe. Atanasijevikj, Petrov 5	(13–15)	Vorkapić 6	Miloud Hadefi Complex Omnisport Arena, Bir El Djir; Referees: Deche, Ghouarda (ALG)
6 July 2022; 11:30	7× (suspension)	Report	1× (yellow card) 13× (suspension) 1× (red card)	Miloud Hadefi Complex Omnisport Arena, Bir El Djir; Referees: Deche, Ghouarda (ALG)

=== Women's tournament ===
Squad

- Marija Simić
- Dunja Radević
- Lana Mijailović
- Nataša Ćetković
- Una Obrenović
- Aleksandra Vukajlović
- Helena Indić
- Srna Sukur
- Isidora Bogunović
- Jelena Đurašinović
- Marija Jovanović
- Edita Nuković
- Teodora Veličković
- Jovana Jovović
- Dunja Tabak
- Katarina Bojičić

Group play

Pos	Team	Pld	W	D	L	GF	GA	GD	Pts	Qualification
1	Serbia	3	3	0	0	78	64	+14	6	Semifinals
2	Portugal	3	2	0	1	69	64	+5	4	Semifinals
3	Turkey	3	1	0	2	86	88	−2	2	Fifth place game
4	North Macedonia	3	0	0	3	62	79	−17	0	Seventh place game

Source: Oran 2022
Rules for classification: 1) Points; 2) Head-to-head points; 3) Head-to-head goal difference; 4) Head-to-head goals scored; 5) Goal difference; 6) Goals scored; 7) Draw.

30 June 2022; 14:15	Serbia	21–20	Portugal	El Hachemí Hantaz Hall, Aïn El Turk; Referees: Kahouadji, Farsi (ALG)
30 June 2022; 14:15	Jovović 11	(13–12)	Sabino 6	El Hachemí Hantaz Hall, Aïn El Turk; Referees: Kahouadji, Farsi (ALG)
30 June 2022; 14:15	1× (yellow card) 2× (suspension) 1× (red card)	Report	3× (suspension)	El Hachemí Hantaz Hall, Aïn El Turk; Referees: Kahouadji, Farsi (ALG)

1 July 2022; 14:15	North Macedonia	18–26	Serbia	El Hachemí Hantaz Hall, Aïn El Turk; Referees: Hamidi, Belkhiri (ALG)
1 July 2022; 14:15	Dukoska, Kiprijanovska 5	(8–10)	Jovović 8	El Hachemí Hantaz Hall, Aïn El Turk; Referees: Hamidi, Belkhiri (ALG)
1 July 2022; 14:15	1× (yellow card) 6× (suspension)	Report	2× (yellow card) 5× (suspension)	El Hachemí Hantaz Hall, Aïn El Turk; Referees: Hamidi, Belkhiri (ALG)

2 July 2022; 12:00	Turkey	26–31	Serbia	El Hachemí Hantaz Hall, Aïn El Turk; Referees: Deche, Ghouarda (ALG)
2 July 2022; 12:00	İskit 5	(14–17)	three players 5	El Hachemí Hantaz Hall, Aïn El Turk; Referees: Deche, Ghouarda (ALG)
2 July 2022; 12:00	2× (yellow card) 7× (suspension)	Report	3× (yellow card) 4× (suspension)	El Hachemí Hantaz Hall, Aïn El Turk; Referees: Deche, Ghouarda (ALG)

Semifinal

4 July 2022; 15:30	Serbia	20–31	Croatia	Miloud Hadefi Complex Omnisport Arena, Bir El Djir; Referees: Sá, Sá (POR)
4 July 2022; 15:30	Vukajlović 8	(12–16)	Barišić, Pavlović 8	Miloud Hadefi Complex Omnisport Arena, Bir El Djir; Referees: Sá, Sá (POR)
4 July 2022; 15:30	1× (yellow card) 3× (suspension)	Report	2× (yellow card) 3× (suspension)	Miloud Hadefi Complex Omnisport Arena, Bir El Djir; Referees: Sá, Sá (POR)

Bronze medal game

6 July 2022; 09:00	Portugal	22–26	Serbia	Miloud Hadefi Complex Omnisport Arena, Bir El Djir; Referees: Pérez, Díaz-Flores (ESP)
6 July 2022; 09:00	three players 4	(12–10)	Jovović, Vukajlović 7	Miloud Hadefi Complex Omnisport Arena, Bir El Djir; Referees: Pérez, Díaz-Flores (ESP)
6 July 2022; 09:00	3× (suspension)	Report	2× (yellow card) 6× (suspension)	Miloud Hadefi Complex Omnisport Arena, Bir El Djir; Referees: Pérez, Díaz-Flores (ESP)

== Judo ==
Men

Athlete	Event	Round of 16	Quarterfinals	Semifinals	Repechage 1	Repechage 2	Final / BM	
Athlete	Event	Opposition Result	Opposition Result	Opposition Result	Opposition Result	Opposition Result	Opposition Result	Rank
Strahinja Bunčić	−66 kg	Bye	Gobert (FRA); W 10-0	Piras (ITA); L 0-01	Bye		Klačar (CRO); W 10-0	3rd place, bronze medalist(s)
Darko Brašnjović	−90 kg	Mosakhlishvili (ESP); L 0-01	Did not advance		Damier (FRA); W 10-0	Chakarovski (MKD); W 10-0	Miletić (BIH); L 0-10	5
Aleksandar Kukolj	−100 kg	Bye	Zekaj (KOS); W 01-0	Bouamar (ALG); L 0-11	Bye		Şişmanlar (TUR); W 11 -0	3rd place, bronze medalist(s)

Women

Athlete	Event	Round of 16	Quarterfinals	Semifinals	Repechage 1	Repechage 2	Final / BM	
Athlete	Event	Opposition Result	Opposition Result	Opposition Result	Opposition Result	Opposition Result	Opposition Result	Rank
Milica Nikolić	−48 kg	Bye	Brito (POR); W 10-0	Lapuerta (ESP); W 10-0	Bye		Vieu (FRA); L 0-01	2nd place, silver medalist(s)
Nadežda Petrović	−52 kg	Giorda (ITA); W 10-0	Iraoui (MAR); L 0-01	Did not advance	Aissahine (ALG); L 0-01	—N/a	Did not advance	
Marica Perišić	−57 kg	Bye	Vellozzi (FRA); W 10-0	Bozkurt (TUR); W 10-0	Bye		Caggiano (ITA); W 10-0	1st place, gold medalist(s)
Milica Žabić	+78 kg	Torkar (SLO); W 10-0	Sayit (TUR); L 0-01	Did not advance	Asselah (ALG); W 10-0	—N/a	Hayme (FRA); L 0-01	5

== Karate ==
Serbia competed in karate.

Men

Athlete	Event	Round of 16	Quarterfinals	Semifinals	Repechage	Final / BM	
Athlete	Event	Opposition Result	Opposition Result	Opposition Result	Opposition Result	Opposition Result	Rank
Stefan Joksić	−67 kg	Benbara (ALG); W 3–2	Tsangaras (CYP); L 1–8	Did not advance			
Đorđe Salapura	−75 kg	Eltemur (TUR); L 0–2	Did not advance				
Vladimir Brežančić	−84 kg	Midoune (ALG); W 10–2	Makamata (FRA); W 1–1	Kvesić (CRO); W 4–0	Bye	Badawy (EGY); L 4–6	2nd place, silver medalist(s)
Đorđe Tešanović	+84 kg	Daikhi (ALG); L 2–7	Did not advance				

Women

Athlete	Event	Round of 16	Quarterfinals	Semifinals	Repechage	Final / BM	
Athlete	Event	Opposition Result	Opposition Result	Opposition Result	Opposition Result	Opposition Result	Rank
Tamara Živković	−61 kg	Zaborska (MKD); W 3–3	Mahjoub (TUN); L 2–8	Did not advance	Sipović (BIH); L 0–4	Did not advance	
Marina Radičević	−68 kg	Bye	Brouk (MAR); L 3–5	Did not advance			
Ivana Perović	+68 kg	Lesjak (CRO); W 1–0	Kydonaki (GRE); L 0–0	Did not advance	Hocaoğlu (TUR); L 0–1	Did not advance	

== Sailing ==
Serbia competed in sailing.

Men

Athlete	Event	Race									Net points	Final rank
Athlete	Event	1	2	3	4	5	6	7	8	F	Net points	Final rank
Nikola Banjac	Laser	15	14	13	15	22	12	19	9	21	118	17

Women

Athlete	Event	Race									Net points	Final rank
Athlete	Event	1	2	3	4	5	6	7	8	F	Net points	Final rank
Kristina Boja	Laser Radial	16	14	14	16	9	14	11	17	17	128	15

== Shooting ==
Serbia competed in shooting.

Men

Athlete	Event	Qualification		Final	
Athlete	Event	Points	Rank	Points	Rank
Damir Mikec	10 m air pistol man	585.0	1 Q	249.0	1st place, gold medalist(s)
Milenko Sebić	10 m air rifle man	625.0	7 Q	259.3	1st place, gold medalist(s)
Lazar Kovačević	10 m air rifle man	632.4	1 Q	205.8	5

Women

Athlete	Event	Qualification		Final	
Athlete	Event	Points	Rank	Points	Rank
Zorana Arunović	10 m air pistol women	577.0	3 Q	248.6	3rd place, bronze medalist(s)
Andrea Arsović	10 m air rifle women	624.5	11	Did not advance	
Teodora Vukojević	10 m air rifle women	626.5	8 Q	261.0	2nd place, silver medalist(s)

Mixed

Athlete	Event	Qualification		Final / BM	
Athlete	Event	Points	Rank	Opposition Result	Rank
Zorana Arunović; Damir Mikec	Mixed 10 metre air pistol team	576	1 Q	France (FRA); W 16–10	1st place, gold medalist(s)
Andrea Arsović; Lazar Kovačević	Mixed 10 metre air rifle team	627.8	2 Q	France (FRA); L 6–16	2nd place, silver medalist(s)
Teodora Vukojević; Milenko Sebić	Mixed 10 metre air rifle team	623.9	6	Did not advance	

== Swimming ==
Men

Athlete	Event	Heat		Final	
Athlete	Event	Time	Rank	Time	Rank
Đurde Matić	50 m butterfly	14.66	14	Did not advance	
Đurde Matić	100 m butterfly	53.27	8 Q	52.82	5
Nikola Aćin	50 m freestyle	22.73	12	Did not advance	
Nikola Aćin	100 m freestyle	50.30	12	Did not advance	
Uroš Nikolić	50 m freestyle	22.80	13	Did not advance	
Uroš Nikolić	100 m freestyle	49.78	6 Q	49.85	7

Women

Athlete	Event	Heat		Final	
Athlete	Event	Time	Rank	Time	Rank
Nina Stanisavljević	50 m backstroke	28.60	1 Q	28.59	1st place, gold medalist(s)
Nina Stanisavljević	50 m butterfly	27.44	10	Did not advance	
Nina Stanisavljević	50 m freestyle	25.67	7 Q	25.77	7
Nina Stanisavljević	100 m freestyle	56.26	8 Q	56.39	5

== Table tennis ==
Men

Athlete	Event	Round Robin 1				Round Robin 1				Quarterfinal	Semifinal	Final / BM	
Athlete	Event	Opposition Score	Opposition Score	Opposition Score	Rank	Opposition Score	Opposition Score	Opposition Score	Rank	Opposition Score	Opposition Score	Opposition Score	Rank
Marko Jevtović	Singles	Bourass (TUN); W 4–0	Mahmuti (KOS); W 4–0	Sgouropoulos (GRE); L 3–4	2 Q	Robles (ESP); L 0–4	Gündüz (TUR); L 3–4	Rembert (FRA); L 2–4	4	Did not advance			
Dimitrije Levajac	Singles	Saleh (EGY); L 0–4	Yigenler (TUR); L 1–4	—N/a	3	Did not advance							
Dimitrije Levajac; Marko Jevtović; Aleksa Gacev	Team	Spain (ESP); W 3–2	Tunis (TUN); W 3–0	—N/a	1 Q	—N/a				Portugal (POR); L 1–3	Did not advance		

Women

Athlete	Event	Round Robin 1				Round Robin 2				Quarterfinal	Semifinal	Final / BM	
Athlete	Event	Opposition Score	Opposition Score	Opposition Score	Rank	Opposition Score	Opposition Score	Opposition Score	Rank	Opposition Score	Opposition Score	Opposition Score	Rank
Sabina Šurjan	Singles	Meletie (CYP); W 4–0	Xiao (ESP); W 4–2	de Matos (POR); W 4–1	1 Q	Garci (TUN); W 4–0	Goda (EGY); L 1–4	Toliou (GRE); W 4–1	3	Did not advance			
Izabela Lupulesku	Singles	Kulakceken (TUR); W 4–2	Pavade (FRA); L 0–4	Loghraibi (ALG); W 4–1	2 Q	Altinkaya (TUR); W 4–0	Zhang (ESP); W 4–1	Piccolin (ITA); W w/o	1 Q	Shao (POR); L 1–4	Did not advance		
Sabina Šurjan; Izabela Lupulesku; Tijana Jokić	Team	Italy (ITA); L 1–3	Turkey (TUR); W 3–2	—N/a	2 Q	—N/a				Spain (ESP); W 3–1	Egypt (EGY); L 1–3	Portugal (POR); L 1–3	4

== Taekwondo ==
Men

Athlete	Event	Round of 16	Quarterfinals	Semifinals	Final	
Athlete	Event	Opposition Result	Opposition Result	Opposition Result	Opposition Result	Rank
Novak Stanić	−68 kg	Bećović (MNE); L 18–42	Did not advance			
Stefan Takov	−80 kg	Baliva (ITA); W 20–10	Telikostoglou (GRE); L 1–5	Did not advance		

Women

Athlete	Event	Round of 16	Quarterfinals	Semifinals	Final	
Athlete	Event	Opposition Result	Opposition Result	Opposition Result	Opposition Result	Rank
Vanja Stanković	−49 kg	Baatouche (ALG); W 32–15	Dinçel (TUR); L 3–16	Did not advance		
Aleksandra Radmilović	−57 kg	Bye	Al Halwani (ITA); L 8–28	Did not advance		
Aleksandra Perišić	−67 kg	Bye	Shehata (EGY); L 4–4	Did not advance		
Nadica Božanić	+67 kg	Tolba (EGY); W 10–3	Laurin (FRA); L 5–24	Did not advance		

== Volleyball ==
Serbia competed in volleyball.

Summary

Team	Event	Group stage				Quarterfinal	Semifinal	Final / BM / Pl.	
Team	Event	Opposition Score	Opposition Score	Opposition Score	Rank	Opposition Score	Opposition Score	Opposition Score	Rank
Serbia men's	Men's tournament	Tunisia; L 0–3	Croatia; L 0–3	Spain; L 2–3	4	Did not advance			
Serbia women's	Women's tournament	France; W 3–1	Croatia; W 3–2	—N/a	1 Q	Egypt; W 3–1	Turkey; L 0–3	Spain; W 3–2	3rd place, bronze medalist(s)

=== Men's tournament ===
Squad

- Aleksa Batak
- Andrej Polomac
- Božidar Vučićević
- Dušan Nikolić
- Stefan Negić
- Uroš Nikolić
- Andrej Rudić
- Aleksandar Stefanović
- Lazar Marinović
- Luka Tadić
- Stefan Skakić
- Lazar Bajandić

Group C

Pos	Team	Pld	W	L	Pts	SW	SL	SR	SPW	SPL	SPR	Qualification
1	Croatia	3	2	1	7	8	4	2.000	272	281	0.968	Final round
2	Spain	3	2	1	5	7	5	1.400	288	250	1.152	Final round
3	Tunisia	3	2	1	5	6	5	1.200	246	222	1.108	Final round
4	Serbia	3	0	3	1	2	9	0.222	216	269	0.803	

Date	Time		Score		Set 1	Set 2	Set 3	Set 4	Set 5	Total	Report
26 Jun	12:00	Tunisia	3–0	Serbia	25–22	25–15	25–20			75–57	P1 P3
27 Jun	12:00	Serbia	0–3	Croatia	20–25	19–25	28–30			67–80	P2 P3
28 Jun	12:00	Spain	3–2	Serbia	22–25	25–19	23–25	25–23	19–17	114–109	P2 P3

=== Women's tournament ===
Squad

- Tara Taubner
- Andrea Tišma
- Minja Osmajić
- Bojana Gočanin
- Jovana Cvetković
- Hena Kurtagić
- Ana Malešević
- Vanja Savić
- Isidora Kockarević
- Branka Tica
- Vanja Ivanović
- Rada Perović

Group A

Pos	Team	Pld	W	L	Pts	SW	SL	SR	SPW	SPL	SPR	Qualification
1	Serbia	2	2	0	5	6	3	2.000	192	187	1.027	Final round
2	Croatia	2	1	1	3	5	5	1.000	209	200	1.045	Final round
3	France	2	0	2	1	3	6	0.500	186	200	0.930	

Date	Time		Score		Set 1	Set 2	Set 3	Set 4	Set 5	Total	Report
27 Jun	09:00	Serbia	3–1	France	19–25	25–17	25–20	25–22		94–84	P2 P3
28 Jun	09:00	Croatia	2–3	Serbia	25–21	20–25	25–12	22–25	11–15	103–98	P2 P3

Quarterfinals

Date	Time		Score		Set 1	Set 2	Set 3	Set 4	Set 5	Total	Report
30 Jun	10:00	Serbia	3–1	Egypt	25–11	25–20	25–27	25–21		100–79	P2 P3

Semifinals

Date	Time		Score		Set 1	Set 2	Set 3	Set 4	Set 5	Total	Report
2 Jul	10:00	Serbia	0–3	Turkey	21–25	14–25	22–25			57–75	P2 P3

Third place game

Date	Time		Score		Set 1	Set 2	Set 3	Set 4	Set 5	Total	Report
4 Jul	09:30	Serbia	3–2	Spain	16–25	25–16	20–25	25–16	15–10	101–92	P2 P3

== Water polo ==
Summary

Team	Event	Group stage					Semifinal	Final / BM / Pl.	
Team	Event	Opposition Score	Opposition Score	Opposition Score	Opposition Score	Rank	Opposition Score	Opposition Score	Rank
Serbia men's	Men's tournament	Slovenia; W 22–6	France; W 18–7	Montenegro; W 9–8	Portugal; W 16–3	1 Q	Italy; W 8–7	Montenegro; W 9–8	1st place, gold medalist(s)

Squad

- Petar Pajković
- Mitar Maraš
- Marko Dimitrijević
- Bogdan Gavrilović
- Nikola Kojić
- Vuk Anđelić
- Zoran Poznanović
- Viktor Urošević
- Aleksandar Kovačević
- Bogdan Brešćanski
- Petar Stanić
- Nikola Vuk Radulović
- Radosav Virijević

Group play

Pos	Team	Pld	W	D	L	GF	GA	GD	Pts	Qualification
1	Serbia	4	4	0	0	65	24	+41	8	Semifinals
2	Montenegro	4	3	0	1	58	27	+31	6	Semifinals
3	Slovenia	4	2	0	2	41	45	−4	4	Fifth place game
4	France	4	1	0	3	37	55	−18	2	Seventh place game
5	Portugal	4	0	0	4	22	72	−50	0	

Source: Oran 2022

25 June 2022; 12:00	Report	Serbia	22–6	Slovenia	Oran; Referees: Arnaldo Petronilli (ITA), Sergio Jiménez (ESP)
25 June 2022; 12:00	Report	Score by quarters: 3–2, 3–2, 7–1, 9–1			Oran; Referees: Arnaldo Petronilli (ITA), Sergio Jiménez (ESP)
25 June 2022; 12:00	Report	Kovačević 4	Goals	Lah 3	Oran; Referees: Arnaldo Petronilli (ITA), Sergio Jiménez (ESP)

26 June 2022; 10:00	Report	France	7–18	Serbia	Oran; Referees: Emanuel Manol Taylan (TUR), Grigorios Spanoudis (GRE)
26 June 2022; 10:00	Report	Score by quarters: 2–4, 1–8, 3–2, 1–4			Oran; Referees: Emanuel Manol Taylan (TUR), Grigorios Spanoudis (GRE)
26 June 2022; 10:00	Report	Mathieu 3	Goals	Kojić 6	Oran; Referees: Emanuel Manol Taylan (TUR), Grigorios Spanoudis (GRE)

27 June 2022; 10:00	Report	Serbia	9–8	Montenegro	Oran; Referees: Sergio Jiménez (ESP), Grigorios Spanoudis (GRE)
27 June 2022; 10:00	Report	Score by quarters: 2–3, 1–2, 2–1, 4–2			Oran; Referees: Sergio Jiménez (ESP), Grigorios Spanoudis (GRE)
27 June 2022; 10:00	Report	Kojić 3	Goals	Baštrica 2	Oran; Referees: Sergio Jiménez (ESP), Grigorios Spanoudis (GRE)

28 June 2022; 12:00	Report	Portugal	3–16	Serbia	Oran; Referees: Sergio Jiménez (ESP), Emanuel Manol Taylan (TUR)
28 June 2022; 12:00	Report	Score by quarters: 0–4, 1–3, 1–4, 1–5			Oran; Referees: Sergio Jiménez (ESP), Emanuel Manol Taylan (TUR)
28 June 2022; 12:00	Report	Santiago 3	Goals	Dimitrijević, Kovačević 3	Oran; Referees: Sergio Jiménez (ESP), Emanuel Manol Taylan (TUR)

Semifinal

29 June 2022; 17:00	Report	Serbia	8–7	Italy	Oran; Referees: Grigorios Spanoudis (GRE), Emanuel Manol Taylan (TUR)
29 June 2022; 17:00	Report	Score by quarters: 3–1, 2–0, 1–4, 2–2			Oran; Referees: Grigorios Spanoudis (GRE), Emanuel Manol Taylan (TUR)
29 June 2022; 17:00	Report	Dimitrijević, Gavrilović 2	Goals	Taramasco 3	Oran; Referees: Grigorios Spanoudis (GRE), Emanuel Manol Taylan (TUR)

Final

30 June 2022; 13:00	Report	Montenegro	8–9	Serbia	Oran; Referees: Ghislain Dehon (FRA), Sergio Jiménez (ESP)
30 June 2022; 13:00	Report	Score by quarters: 2–1, 2–4, 3–2, 1–2			Oran; Referees: Ghislain Dehon (FRA), Sergio Jiménez (ESP)
30 June 2022; 13:00	Report	L. Vukičević 3	Goals	Gavrilović, Kojić 2	Oran; Referees: Ghislain Dehon (FRA), Sergio Jiménez (ESP)

== Weightlifting ==
Men

Athlete	Event	Snatch		Clean & Jerk	
Athlete	Event	Result	Rank	Result	Rank
Stevan Vladisavljev	−61 kg	110	5	130	6

Women

Athlete	Event	Snatch		Clean & Jerk	
Athlete	Event	Result	Rank	Result	Rank
Sonja Bjelić	−71 kg	85	10	100	12

== Wrestling ==
Men's Freestyle wrestling

Athlete	Event	Round of 16	Quarterfinal	Semifinal	Final / BM	
Athlete	Event	Opposition Result	Opposition Result	Opposition Result	Opposition Result	Rank
Stevan Mićić	−65 kg	Bye	Sticker (FRA); W 10-0	Abakarov (ALB); L 0-9	Aktaş (TUR); W 9-0	3rd place, bronze medalist(s)
Magomedgadzhi Nurasulov	−125 kg	Bye	Khalil (ALG); W 10-0	Ercan (TUR); W 10-2	Conyedo (ITA); W 8-1	1st place, gold medalist(s)

Women's Freestyle wrestling

Athlete	Event	Group Stage				Semifinal	Final / BM	
Athlete	Event	Opposition Result	Opposition Result	Opposition Result	Rank	Opposition Result	Opposition Result	Rank
Ana Fabian	−62 kg	Douarre (FRA); L 1-4	Pérez (ESP); L 0-2	Tuğcu (TUR); L 0-11	4	Did not advance		

Greco-Roman wrestling

Athlete	Event	Round of 16	Quarterfinal	Semifinal	Repechage	Final / BM	
Athlete	Event	Opposition Result	Opposition Result	Opposition Result	Opposition Result	Opposition Result	Rank
Viktor Nemeš	−77 kg	Abouelatta (EGY); W 9-0	Kupi (ALB); W 10-1	Prevolarakis (GRE); W 9-0	Bye	Ouakali (ALG); W 9-0	1st place, gold medalist(s)
Žarko Dickov	−87 kg	—N/a	Minguzzi (ITA); L 3-6	Did not advance	—N/a	Hassan (EGY); L 4-6	5
