= Morocco at the 2022 Mediterranean Games =

- IOC code: MAR
- NOC: Moroccan Olympic Committee

in Oran, Algeria 25 June – 5 July
- Competitors: 137 in 15 sports
- Medals Ranked 15th: Gold 3 Silver 13 Bronze 17 Total 33

Mediterranean Games appearances
- 1959; 1963; 1967; 1971; 1975; 1979; 1983; 1987; 1991; 1993; 1997; 2001; 2005; 2009; 2013; 2018; 2022

Morocco competed at the 2022 Mediterranean Games in Oran, Algeria over 10 days from 25 June to 6 July 2022 with delegation of 137 athletes in 15 sports.

== Boxing ==
Morocco competed in boxing.

Men

Athlete	Event	Round of 16	Quarterfinals	Semifinals	Final	
Athlete	Event	Opposition Result	Opposition Result	Opposition Result	Opposition Result	Rank
Said Mortaji	Flyweight (52 kg)	Bye	Ibrahim Boukedim (FRA); W 2-1	Omer Ametović (SRB); W W/O	Federico Serra (ITA); L RSC	2nd place, silver medalist(s)
Abdellatif Zouhairi	Featherweight (57 kg)	Ardit Murja (ALB); W 3-0	Omar Abozaid (EGY); W 2-1	Batuhan Çiftçi (TUR); L 0-3	did not advance	3rd place, bronze medalist(s)
Mohamed Hamout	Lightweight (60 kg)	Mostafa Komsan (EGY); W 3-0	Nazif Sejdi (SRB); W 3-0	Giuseppe Canonico (ITA); W 3-0	Enzo Grau (FRA); W 3-0	1st place, gold medalist(s)
Abdelhaq Nadir	Light Welterweight (63 kg)	Nik Nikolov Veber (SLO); W 3-0	Semiz Aličić (SRB); W 3-0	Gianluigi Malanga (ITA); L 0-3	did not advance	3rd place, bronze medalist(s)
Hamza El Barbari	Welterweight (69 kg)	Patriot Behrami (KOS); W ABD	Gianni Dedić (BIH); W 3-0	Jugurtha Ait-Bekka (ALG); L 1-2	did not advance	3rd place, bronze medalist(s)
Zine El Abidine Amroug	Middleweight (75 kg)	Mohamed Aziz Touati (TUN); W 3-0	Salvatore Cavallaro (ITA); L 1-2	did not advance		
Mohamed Assaghir	Light Heavyweight (81 kg)	Cheikhmar Koné (FRA); W 3-0	Mohammed Houmri (ALG); L 0-3	did not advance		
Mohamed Firisse	Super Heavyweight (+91 kg)	—	Yousry Hafez (EGY); L 0-3	did not advance		

Women

Athlete	Event	Round of 16	Quarterfinals	Semifinals	Final	
Athlete	Event	Opposition Result	Opposition Result	Opposition Result	Opposition Result	Rank
Yasmine Mouttaki	Minimumweight (48 kg)	—	Marta López (ESP); L 0-3	did not advance		
Widad Bertal	Bantamweight (54 kg)	Salma Friga (FRA); W 3-0	Fatma Hadjala (ALG); L 0-3	did not advance		
Chaymae Rhaddi	Lightweight (60 kg)	—	Mariem Homrani (TUN); W 2-1	Rebecca Nicoli (ITA); W 2-1	Hadjila Khelif (ALG); L 1-2	2nd place, silver medalist(s)
Oumaïma Belahbib	Welterweight (66 kg)	—	Fatia Benmessahel (FRA); W 2-1	Ichrak Chaib (ALG); L W/O	did not advance	3rd place, bronze medalist(s)

== Equestrian ==
Morocco competed in equestrian.

== Football ==
=== Men's tournament ===
Standings

Results

=== Group A ===
Pos	Team	Pld	W	D	L	GF	GA	GD	Pts	Qualification
1	France	3	2	1	0	5	3	+2	7	Semifinals
2	Morocco	3	1	1	1	3	2	+1	4	Semifinals
3	Algeria (H)	3	1	0	2	3	5	−2	3	
4	Spain	3	0	2	1	2	3	−1	2	

Source: Oran 2022
(H) Hosts
26 June 2022
20:00

France	1–0	Morocco
Messoussa 15'	Report

Abdelkrim Kerroum Stadium, Sig
Referee: Luca Pairetto (Italy)
28 June 2022
17:00

Algeria	0–2	Morocco
	Report	Boukhres 48'; Raihani 64'

Abdelkrim Kerroum Stadium, Sig
Referee: Amir Loucif (Tunisia)
30 June 2022
20:00

Morocco	1–1	Spain
Khalifi 23' (pen.)	Report	Álvaro 12'

Mers El Hadjadj Stadium, Mers El Hadjadj
Referee: Bruno José Costa (Portugal)

=== Semifinals ===
2 July 2022
20:00

Italy	2–1	Morocco
Raimondo 55', 63'	Report	Khalifi 90+3' (pen.)

Abdelkrim Kerroum Stadium, Sig
Referee: Jérémie Pignard (France)

=== Bronze medal match ===
4 July 2022
17:00

Turkey	2–4	Morocco
Biçer 15', 58'	Report	Anhari 45+1'; Raihani 47'; Maurer 73'; Sadik 86'

Miloud Hadefi Stadium, Bir El Djir
Referee: Bruno José Costa (Portugal)

== Judo ==
Men

Athlete	Event	Round of 16	Quarterfinals	Semifinals	Repechage 1	Repechage 2	Final / BM	
Athlete	Event	Opposition Result	Opposition Result	Opposition Result	Opposition Result	Opposition Result	Opposition Result	Rank
Issam Bassou	60 kg	bye	Mihraç Akkuş (TUR); W 10-00	Francisco Garrigós (ESP); L 00-10	bye	bye	Maxime Merlin (FRA); W 01-00	3rd place, bronze medalist(s)
Abderrahmane Boushita	66 kg	bye	Robert Klačar (CRO); W 10-00	Mohamed Abdelmawgoud (EGY); L 01-11	bye	bye	Maxime Gobert (FRA); L 00-10	4
Hassan Doukkali	73 kg	Kyprianos Andreou (CYP); W 11-01	Martin Hojak (SLO); W 01-00	Aleddine Ben Chalbi (TUN); W 10-00	bye	bye	Messaoud Dris (ALG); L 01-10	2nd place, silver medalist(s)
Achraf Moutii	81 kg	bye	Kenny Komi Bedel (ITA); L 00-10	Did not advance	Manuel Rodrigues (POR); L 00-11	Did not advance		
Zouhair Esseryry	+100 kg	Marvin Gadeau (MON); W 10-00	Guerman Andreev (FRA); L 00-10	Did not advance	bye	Irinel Chelaru (ESP); W 10-00	Lorenzo Agro Sylvan (ITA); L 00-10	4

Women

Athlete	Event	Round of 16	Quarterfinals	Semifinals	Repechage 1	Repechage 2	Final / BM	
Athlete	Event	Opposition Result	Opposition Result	Opposition Result	Opposition Result	Opposition Result	Opposition Result	Rank
Chaimae Eddinari	48 kg	Raquel Brito (POR); L 00-10	Did not advance					
Soumiya Iraoui	52 kg	bye	Nadežda Petrović (SRB); W 01-00	Ana Viktorija Puljiz (CRO); L 00-01	—	bye	Chloé Devictor (FRA); L 00-10	4
Sarah Harachi	63 kg	bye	Meriem Bjaoui (TUN); W 11-01	Cristina Cabaña (ESP); L 00-01	—	bye	Iva Oberan (CRO); L 00-10	4
Hafsa Yatim	78 kg	bye	Petrunjela Pavić (CRO); L 00-01	Did not advance	—	Nurcan Yılmaz (TUR); L 00-10	Did not advance	

== Karate ==
Men

Athlete	Event	Round of 16	Quarterfinals	Semifinals	Repechage	Final / BM	
Athlete	Event	Opposition Result	Opposition Result	Opposition Result	Opposition Result	Opposition Result	Rank
Abdelali Jina	60 kg	Álex Ortiz (ESP); W 5–2	Angelo Crescenzo (ITA); L 3–4	did not advance			
Said Oubaya	67 kg	Boran Berak (CRO); W6–5	Burak Uygur (TUR); W 1–0	Dionysios Xenos (GRE); L 0–2	—	Ahmed Lotfy (EGY); L 0–0	4
Anass Alami	75 kg	Tiago Gonçalves (POR); L 5–6	did not advance				
Nabil Ech-Chaabi	84 kg	Petar Spasenovski (MKD); W8–0	Youssef Badawy (EGY); L2–4	did not advance	Uğur Aktaş (TUR); L4–4	did not advance	
Mehdi Sriti	+84 kg	Stefan Joksimović (SLO); W5–0	Babacar Seck (ESP); W11–3	Hocine Daikhi (ALG); L1–7	Bye	Nuno Valente (POR); W8–0	3rd place, bronze medalist(s)

Women

Athlete	Event	Round of 16	Quarterfinals	Semifinals	Repechage	Final / BM	
Athlete	Event	Opposition Result	Opposition Result	Opposition Result	Opposition Result	Opposition Result	Rank
Chaimae El Hayti	50 kg	Iris Ćorić (BIH); W2–1	Reem Salama (EGY); L1–5	did not advance	Bye	Serap Özçelik (TUR); W2–0	3rd place, bronze medalist(s)
Farida Mrabet Lemti	55 kg	Ahlam Youssef (EGY); L0–6	did not advance		Arianne Gonzales (CYP); L2–2	did not advance	
Fatima-Zahra Chajai	61 kg	Salma El-Shafei (EGY); L0–0	did not advance				
Nissrine Brouk	68 kg	Adriana Gil (ESP); W0–0	Marina Radičević (SRB); W5–3	Feryal Abdelaziz (EGY); L1–2	—	Vasiliki Panetsidou (GRE); W3–3	3rd place, bronze medalist(s)

== Shooting ==
Morocco competed in shooting.

== Taekwondo ==
Men

Athlete	Event	Round of 16	Quarterfinals	Semifinals	Final	Rank
Omar Lakehal	58 kg	Bye	Herwan Onanga (FRA); W 29-5	Ömer Faruk Dayıoğlu (TUR); W 26-23	Adrián Vicente (ESP); L 12-26	2nd place, silver medalist(s)
Abdelbasset Wasfi	68 kg	Lin Kovačič (SLO); L 15-17	did not advance			
Youssef Boatris	80 kg	Ismaël Bouzid Souhli (FRA); W 33-31	Seif Eissa (EGY); L 9-13	did not advance		
Ayoub Bassel	+80 kg	Bye	Emre Kutalmış Ateşli (TUR); W 9-6	Roberto Botta (ITA); W IRM	Ivan Šapina (CRO); L 25-35	2nd place, silver medalist(s)

Women

Athlete	Event	Round of 16	Quarterfinals	Semifinals	Final	Rank
Nezha Elaasal	49 kg	Džejla Makaš (BIH); W 25-3	Adriana Cerezo (ESP); L 4-26	did not advance		
Nada Laaraj	57 kg	Bye	Ashrakat Darwish (EGY); L 13-13	did not advance		
Safia Salih	67 kg	Cristina Gaspa (ITA); W 4-3	Magda Wiet-Hénin (FRA); L 1-21	did not advance		
Fatima-Ezzahra Aboufaras	+67 kg	Bye	Maristella Smiraglia (ITA); W 23-13	Althéa Laurin (FRA); W 9-6	Nafia Kuş (TUR); L 0-5	2nd place, silver medalist(s)
