= Judo at the 2022 Mediterranean Games – Men's 100 kg =

Judo competitions

Judo Men's 100 kg at the 2022 Mediterranean Games
- Venue: Mohammed Ben Ahmed Convention Centre – Hall 03 and 06
- Location: Oran, Algeria
- Date: 1 July
- Competitors: 10 from 10 nations

Medalists
gold medal	Nikoloz Sherazadishvili	Spain
silver medal	Mustapha Bouamar	Algeria
bronze medal	Joris Agbegnenou	France
bronze medal	Aleksandar Kukolj	Serbia

The men's 100 kg competition in judo at the 2022 Mediterranean Games was held on 1 July at the Mohammed Ben Ahmed Convention Centre in Oran.

== Results ==
=== Main bracket ===
Round of 16
Enrico Bergamelli (ITA)	00
Shpati Zekaj (KOS)	10
Joris Agbegnenou (FRA)	10
Diogo Brites (POR)	00

Quarterfinals
Aleksandar Kukolj (SRB)	01
Shpati Zekaj (KOS)	00
Mustapha Bouamar (ALG)	11
Marko Kumrić (CRO)	00
Koussay Ben Ghares (TUN)	00
Joris Agbegnenou (FRA)	01
Nikoloz Sherazadishvili (ESP)	11
Mert Şişmanlar (TUR)	00

Semifinals
Aleksandar Kukolj (SRB)	00
Mustapha Bouamar (ALG)	11
Joris Agbegnenou (FRA)	00
Nikoloz Sherazadishvili (ESP)	10

Final
Mustapha Bouamar (ALG)	01
Nikoloz Sherazadishvili (ESP)	11

=== Repechage ===
Repechage 2
Shpati Zekaj (KOS)	00
Marko Kumrić (CRO)	11

Bronze medal
Marko Kumrić (CRO)	00
Joris Agbegnenou (FRA)	01

Repechage 1
Diogo Brites (POR)	00
Koussay Ben Ghares (TUN)	11

Repechage 2
Koussay Ben Ghares (TUN)	00
Mert Şişmanlar (TUR)	01

Bronze medal
Mert Şişmanlar (TUR)	00
Aleksandar Kukolj (SRB)	11
