= Judo at the 2022 Mediterranean Games – Men's 66 kg =

Judo competitions

Judo Men's 66 kg at the 2022 Mediterranean Games
- Venue: Mohammed Ben Ahmed Convention Centre – Hall 03 and 06
- Location: Oran, Algeria
- Date: 29 June
- Competitors: 11 from 11 nations

Medalists
gold medal	Mohamed Abdelmawgoud	Egypt
silver medal	Matteo Piras	Italy
bronze medal	Maxime Gobert	France
bronze medal	Strahinja Bunčić	Serbia

The men's 66 kg competition in judo at the 2022 Mediterranean Games was held on 29 June at the Mohammed Ben Ahmed Convention Centre in Oran.

== Results ==
=== Main bracket ===
Round of 16
Rachid Cherrad (ALG)	00
Matteo Piras (ITA)	10
Robert Klačar (CRO)	10
Bernardo Tralhão Fernandes (POR)	00
Ejder Toktay (TUR)	00
Georgios Balarjishvili (CYP)	10

Quarterfinals
Alberto Gaitero (ESP)	00
Matteo Piras (ITA)	01
Strahinja Bunčić (SRB)	10
Maxime Gobert (FRA)	00
Abderrahmane Boushita (MAR)	10
Robert Klačar (CRO)	00
Mohamed Abdelmawgoud (EGY)	11
Georgios Balarjishvili (CYP)	01

Semifinals
Matteo Piras (ITA)	01
Strahinja Bunčić (SRB)	00
Abderrahmane Boushita (MAR)	01
Mohamed Abdelmawgoud (EGY)	11

Final
Matteo Piras (ITA)	00
Mohamed Abdelmawgoud (EGY)	11

=== Repechage ===
Repechage 1
Rachid Cherrad (ALG)	01
Alberto Gaitero (ESP)	10

Repechage 2
Alberto Gaitero (ESP)	00
Maxime Gobert (FRA)	01

Bronze medal
Maxime Gobert (FRA)	10
Abderrahmane Boushita (MAR)	00

Repechage 2
Robert Klačar (CRO)	10
Georgios Balarjishvili (CYP)	00

Bronze medal
Robert Klačar (CRO)	00
Strahinja Bunčić (SRB)	01
