= Mohamed Talaat (equestrian) =

Egyptian equestrian

Personal information
- Nationality: Egypt
- Born: 12 August 1988 (age 38)

Sport
- Sport: Equestrian

Mohamed Talaat (born 12 August 1988) is an Egyptian equestrian. He competed in the 2020 Summer Olympics.

In August 2019, Talaat tested positive for cannabis at the African Games held in Morocco. After a long and protracted process, in December 2021 he was issued with a two-year ban backdated to June 2021, which was reduced after appeal in June 2022 to a one-year ban. His results (which included his team results) for the African Games and the Tokyo 2020 Olympic Games were retrospectively disqualified. The period of ineligibility did not start in August 2019 because Talaat did not serve a provisional suspension at that time.
