= Àngel Fabregat =

Catalan writer

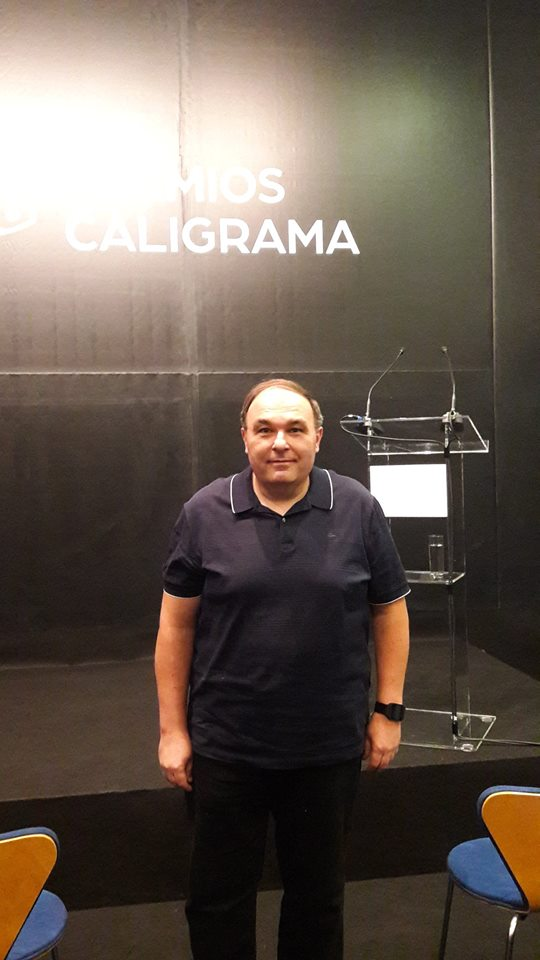
Caligrama Awards Ceremony at the headquarters of the Grupo Editorial Penguin Random House

Àngel Fabregat Morera (born 1965, in Belianes) is a Catalan writer.

He studied at the Technical University of Madrid and at the Open University of Catalonia.

== Prizes ==
- Premi Gabriel Ferrater 1988 de Poesia. Premis Literaris Baix Camp per a joves d'Òmnium Cultural.
- Premi de Poesia "Club d'Amics de la Unesco de Barcelona 1988".
- Premi Literari "Sant Jordi" (1989) Generalitat de Catalunya.
- Premi Ateneu Igualadí 1990.
- Premi e-poemes de La Vanguardia 2009.
- Premi de Poesia Miquel Bosch i Jover 2010.
- Premi de Poesia Josefina Oliveras 2010.
- Premi de Poesia Francesc Candel 2010.
- Premi de les Lletres Vila de Corbera 2010.

== Works ==
- Antologia d'un Onatge (Ed. Columna, 1990)
- Els vençuts.

=== Coauthor ===
- Sol de Violoncel (Ed. Reus : Òmnium Cultural Baix Camp, 1988)
- Paisatges amb Solitud (Ed. Reus : Òmnium Cultural Baix Camp, 1989)
- Els Mars Tancats (Ed. Reus : Òmnium Cultural Baix Camp, 1991)
