= Luis Macedo =

American former fugitive on parole (born 1988)

FBI Ten Most Wanted Fugitive
- Charges: Unlawful Flight to Avoid Prosecution – First Degree Murder
- Reward: Up to $100,000
- Alias: "Ye-Ye", Luis Macebo, Luis M. Macedo, Louis Macedo, Louis M. Macedo, Luis M. Maczdo, Luis M. Mercado

Description
- Born: Between February 3 and March 22, 1988 (age 38) (Note: Dates of birth used: February 3, March 2, 3, 8 and 22); Illinois, United States
- Nationality: American
- Gender: male
- Height: 5 ft 5 in (1.65 m)
- Weight: 130 lb (59 kg)

Status
- Caught: August 27, 2017
- Number: 507
- Captured

Luis Macedo is an American former fugitive on parole who was wanted for the murder of 15-year-old Alex Arellano in Chicago, Illinois. On May 1, 2009, Arellano was beaten, shot, and set on fire by Latin Kings gang members after refusing to show a gang sign. Macedo, a member of Latin Kings, is said to have started the attack. Macedo was federally charged with fleeing to avoid prosecution. According to authorities, he was said to be living in Mexico (where he was eventually apprehended).

== Recent events and capture ==
In 2016, Macedo was added to FBI Ten Most Wanted Fugitives list. He was captured on August 27, 2017, in Guadalajara, Jalisco, Mexico without incident.

Macedo was profiled on The Hunt with John Walsh episode '"Enemy Territory" which premiered October 15, 2017.
