= Egypt at the 2022 Mediterranean Games =

- IOC code: EGY
- NOC: Egyptian Olympic Committee

in Oran, Algeria 25 June 2022 – 6 July 2022
- Medals Ranked 6th: Gold 13 Silver 15 Bronze 23 Total 51

Mediterranean Games appearances (overview)
- 1951; 1955; 1959–1967; 1971; 1975; 1979; 1983; 1987; 1991; 1993; 1997; 2001; 2005; 2009; 2013; 2018; 2022; 2026

Other related appearances
- United Arab Republic (1959, 1963)

Egypt competed at the 2022 Mediterranean Games held in Oran, Algeria from 25 June to 6 July 2022.

== Medalists ==
Medal	Name	Sport	Event	Date
Gold	Youssef Badawy	Karate	Men's 84 kg	27 June
Gold	Feryal Abdelaziz	Karate	Women's 68 kg	27 June
Gold	Mariam Alhodaby; Dina Meshref; Hana Goda	Table tennis	Women's team	27 June
Gold	Amr Reda Hussen	Wrestling	Men's freestyle 74 kg	28 June
Gold	Mohamed Abdelmawgoud	Judo	Men's 60 kg	29 June
Gold	Yousry Hafez	Boxing	Men's super heavyweight	1 July
Gold	Neama Said	Weightlifting	Women's 71 kg Snatch	3 July
Gold	Neama Said	Weightlifting	Women's 71 kg Clean & Jerk	3 July
Gold	Basant Hemida	Athletics	Women's 100 metres	30 June
Gold	Basant Hemida	Athletics	Women's 200 metres	3 July
Gold	Seif Eissa	Taekwondo	Men's 80 kg	4 July
Gold	Mohamed El-Sayed	Fencing	Men's épée	
Gold	Ziad El-Sissy	Fencing	Men's sabre	
Silver	Abdalla Abdelaziz	Karate	Men's 75 kg	26 June
Silver	Reem Salama	Karate	Women's 50 kg	26 June
Silver	Ahlam Youssef	Karate	Women's 55 kg	26 June
Silver	Abdellatif Mohamed	Wrestling	Men's Greco-Roman 130 kg	27 June
Silver	Yehia Hafez	Wrestling	Men's freestyle 65 kg	28 June
Silver	Omar Assar	Table tennis	Men's singles	30 June
Silver	Ahmed Eltamadi	Weightlifting	Men's 61 kg Snatch	1 July
Silver	Ahmed Eltamadi	Weightlifting	Men's 61 kg Clean & Jerk	1 July
Silver	Esraa Owis	Athletics	Women's long jump	1 July
Silver	Ihab Abdelrahman	Athletics	Men's javelin throw	2 July
Silver	Karim Abokahla	Weightlifting	Men's 89 kg Snatch	3 July
Silver	Karim Abokahla	Weightlifting	Men's 89 kg Clean & Jerk	3 July
Silver	Ashrakat Darwish	Taekwondo	Women's 57 kg	3 July
Silver	Mohamed El-Naggar on Comme Il Faut; Mohamed Talaat on Darshan; Mohamed Weaam on Morocco; Mouda Zeyada on Katia	Equestrian	Team jumping	
Silver	Men's team	Handball	Men's tournament	6 July
Bronze	Amr Aboukora	Karate	Men's 60 kg	26 June
Bronze	Ahmed Lotfy	Karate	Men's 67 kg	26 June
Bronze	Haithem Mahmoud	Wrestling	Men's Greco-Roman 60 kg	27 June
Bronze	Omar Abdelrahman	Wrestling	Men's Greco-Roman 67 kg	27 June
Bronze	Noureldin Hassan	Wrestling	Men's Greco-Roman 87 kg	27 June
Bronze	Youssif Hemida	Wrestling	Men's freestyle 125 kg	28 June
Bronze	Doha Hany	Badminton	Women's singles	29 June
Bronze	Shaimaa Mohamed	Wrestling	Women's freestyle 53 kg	29 June
Bronze	Samar Amer	Wrestling	Women's freestyle 76 kg	29 June
Bronze	Youssry Samy	Judo	Men's 60 kg	29 June
Bronze	Ali Zahran	Gymnastics	Men's rings	29 June
Bronze	Mohamed Magdi Hamza	Athletics	Men's shot put	30 June
Bronze	Omar Elsayed	Boxing	Men's welterweight	1 July
Bronze	Yomna Ayyad	Boxing	Women's bantamweight	1 July
Bronze	Basma Ibrahim	Weightlifting	Women's 59 kg Clean & Jerk	2 July
Bronze	Shahd El-Hosseiny	Taekwondo	Women's 49 kg	3 July
Bronze	Ahmed Ali	Weightlifting	Men's 102 kg Clean & Jerk	4 July
Bronze	Ahmed Gaber	Weightlifting	Men's +102 kg Snatch	4 July
Bronze	Ahmed Gaber	Weightlifting	Men's +102 kg Clean & Jerk	4 July
Bronze	Aya Shehata	Taekwondo	Women's 67 kg	4 July
Bronze	Mohamed Talaat	Equestrian	Individual jumping	
Bronze	Mohamed Hamza	Fencing	Men's foil	
Bronze	Azmy Mehelba	Shooting	Men's skeet	

== Archery ==
Egypt competed in archery.

Athlete	Event	Ranking round		Round of 64	Round of 32	Round of 16	Quarterfinals	Semifinals	Final / BM	
Athlete	Event	Score	Seed	Opposition Score	Opposition Score	Opposition Score	Opposition Score	Opposition Score	Opposition Score	Rank
Aly Abdelbar	Individual	618	18	El Rayes (LBN); W 6-0	Musolesi (ITA); L 1-7	Did not advance				
Bahaaeldin Aly	Individual	583	30	bye	Remar (CRO); L 3-7	Did not advance				

Women

Athlete	Event	Ranking round		Round of 32	Round of 16	Quarterfinals	Semifinals	Final / BM	
Athlete	Event	Score	Seed	Opposition Score	Opposition Score	Opposition Score	Opposition Score	Opposition Score	Rank
Nada Azzam	Individual	568	24	Andreoli (ITA); L 2-6	Did not advance				
Israa Yassen	Individual	524	26	Boari (ITA); L 0-6	Did not advance				

Mixed

Athlete	Event	Ranking round		Round of 16	Quarterfinals	Semifinals	Final / BM	
Athlete	Event	Score	Seed	Opposition Score	Opposition Score	Opposition Score	Opposition Score	Rank
Nada Azzam; Aly Abdelbar	Mixed team	1186	9	Petrou (CYP); Charalambous (CYP); L 0-6	Did not advance			

== Artistic gymnastics ==
Egypt competed in artistic gymnastics.

== Athletics ==
Egypt won five medals in athletics.

== Basketball ==
Egypt competed in Basketball.

== Badminton ==
Egypt competed in badminton.

== Boxing ==
Egypt won three medals in boxing.

== Equestrian ==
Egypt won two medals in equestrian.

== Fencing ==
Egypt won three medals in fencing.

== Handball ==
Egypt won one medal in handball.

Summary

Team	Event	Group stage					Semifinal	Final / BM / Pl.	
Team	Event	Opposition Score	Opposition Score	Opposition Score	Opposition Score	Rank	Opposition Score	Opposition Score	Rank
Egypt men's	Men's tournament	Italy; W 38–35	Serbia; W 35–28	Tunisia; W 30–26	Slovenia; W 10–0	1 Q	North Macedonia; W 34–20	Egypt; L 27–28	2nd place, silver medalist(s)

Group stage

Pos	Team	Pld	W	D	L	GF	GA	GD	Pts	Qualification
1	Egypt	4	4	0	0	113	89	+24	8	Semifinals
2	Serbia	4	3	0	1	107	97	+10	6	Semifinals
3	Tunisia	4	2	0	2	99	94	+5	4	Fifth place game
4	Italy	4	1	0	3	107	106	+1	2	Seventh place game
5	Slovenia (Note: Slovenia withdrew from the tournament due to several positive COVID-19 cases. The matches were counted as a 10–0 win for the opposing team.)	4	0	0	4	0	40	−40	0	Ninth place game

Source: Oran 2022
Rules for classification: 1) Points; 2) Head-to-head points; 3) Head-to-head goal difference; 4) Head-to-head goals scored; 5) Goal difference; 6) Goals scored; 7) Draw.
Notes:

27 June 2022; 16:00	Egypt	38–35	Italy	24 February Indoor Hall, Arzew; Referees: Ilievski, Ilievski (MKD)
27 June 2022; 16:00	Kaddah 9	(20–14)	Parisini 8	24 February Indoor Hall, Arzew; Referees: Ilievski, Ilievski (MKD)
27 June 2022; 16:00	3× (suspension)	Report	1× (suspension)	24 February Indoor Hall, Arzew; Referees: Ilievski, Ilievski (MKD)

28 June 2022; 14:00	Serbia	28–35	Egypt	24 February Indoor Hall, Arzew; Referees: Sá, Sá (POR)
28 June 2022; 14:00	Grozdanić 7	(12–16)	El-Ahmar 6	24 February Indoor Hall, Arzew; Referees: Sá, Sá (POR)
28 June 2022; 14:00	2× (yellow card) 6× (suspension)	Report	3× (suspension) 1×	24 February Indoor Hall, Arzew; Referees: Sá, Sá (POR)

30 June 2022; 12:00	Egypt	30–26	Tunisia	24 February Indoor Hall, Arzew; Referees: Sá, Sá (POR)
30 June 2022; 12:00	Mesilhy 6	(15–13)	Boughanmi 6	24 February Indoor Hall, Arzew; Referees: Sá, Sá (POR)
30 June 2022; 12:00	4× (suspension)	Report	2× (yellow card) 6× (suspension) 1× (red card)	24 February Indoor Hall, Arzew; Referees: Sá, Sá (POR)

Cancelled	Slovenia	0–10	Egypt	24 February Indoor Hall, Arzew

Semifinal

4 July 2022; 13:00	Egypt	34–20	North Macedonia	Miloud Hadefi Complex Omnisport Arena, Bir El Djir; Referees: Ghouarda, Deche (ALG)
4 July 2022; 13:00	Sanad 8	(16–10)	four players 4	Miloud Hadefi Complex Omnisport Arena, Bir El Djir; Referees: Ghouarda, Deche (ALG)
4 July 2022; 13:00	1× (yellow card) 4× (suspension)	Report	3× (yellow card) 4× (suspension)	Miloud Hadefi Complex Omnisport Arena, Bir El Djir; Referees: Ghouarda, Deche (ALG)

Gold medal game

6 July 2022; 16:30	Egypt	27–28	Spain	Miloud Hadefi Complex Omnisport Arena, Bir El Djir; Referees: Belkhiri, Hamidi (ALG)
6 July 2022; 16:30	Sanad 7	(16–13)	Tarrafeta 10	Miloud Hadefi Complex Omnisport Arena, Bir El Djir; Referees: Belkhiri, Hamidi (ALG)
6 July 2022; 16:30	3× (suspension)	Report	1× (yellow card) 5× (suspension)	Miloud Hadefi Complex Omnisport Arena, Bir El Djir; Referees: Belkhiri, Hamidi (ALG)

== Judo ==
Egypt competed in judo.

Men

Athlete	Event	Round of 16	Quarterfinals	Semifinals	Repechage 1	Repechage 2	Final / BM	
Athlete	Event	Opposition Result	Opposition Result	Opposition Result	Opposition Result	Opposition Result	Opposition Result	Rank
Youssry Samy	60 kg	Bye	Suleiman Al-Refai (SYR); W 10-00	Fraj Dhouibi (TUN); L 00-01	—N/a	Bye	Bilal Yagoubi (ALG); W 10-00	3rd place, bronze medalist(s)
Mohamed Abdelmawgoud	66 kg	Bye	Georgios Balarjishvili (CYP); W 11-01	Matteo Piras (ITA); W 11-01	Bye		Matteo Piras (ITA); W 11-00	1st place, gold medalist(s)

== Karate ==
Egypt won seven medals in karate.

Men

Athlete	Event	Round of 16	Quarterfinals	Semifinals	Repechage	Final / BM	
Athlete	Event	Opposition Result	Opposition Result	Opposition Result	Opposition Result	Opposition Result	Rank
Amr Aboukora	−60 kg	Theopemtou (CYP); W 0–0	Xenos (GRE); W 5–0	Şamdan (TUR); L 1–5	—N/a	Dujaković (BIH); W 8–4	3rd place, bronze medalist(s)
Ahmed Lotfy	−67 kg	Ennkhaili (ESP); W 3–0	Xenos (GRE); L 0–2	—N/a	—N/a	Oubaya (MAR); W 0–0	3rd place, bronze medalist(s)
Abdalla Abdelaziz	−75 kg	Bargados (ESP); W 6–4	Busà (ITA); W 1–1	Garibović (CRO); W 2–0	—N/a	Zaid (ALG); L 4–5	2nd place, silver medalist(s)
Youssef Badawy	−84 kg	Uğur Aktaş (TUR); W 1–0	Ech-Chaabi (MAR); W 4–2	Ibáñez (ESP); W 4–1	—N/a	Brežančić (SRB); W 6–4	1st place, gold medalist(s)
Taha Mahmoud	+84 kg	Džuho (BIH); L 2–3	—N/a	—N/a	—N/a	—N/a	10

Women

Athlete	Event	Round of 16	Quarterfinals	Semifinals	Repechage	Final / BM	
Athlete	Event	Opposition Result	Opposition Result	Opposition Result	Opposition Result	Opposition Result	Rank
Reem Salama	−50 kg	Bye	El Hayti (MAR); W 5–1	Özçelik (TUR); W 1–1	—N/a	Ouikene (ALG); L 0–5	2nd place, silver medalist(s)
Ahlam Youssef	−55 kg	Mrabet Lemti (MAR); W 6–0	Gonzales (CYP); W 7–1	Yakan (TUR); W 8–0	—N/a	Abouriche (ALG); L 1–4	2nd place, silver medalist(s)
Salma El-Shafei	−61 kg	Chajai (MAR); W 0–0	Dario (FRA); L 3–5	—N/a	—N/a	—N/a	7
Feryal Abdelaziz	−68 kg	Bye	Panetsidou (GRE); W 2–0	Brouk (MAR); W 2–1	—N/a	Semeraro (ITA); W 2–0	1st place, gold medalist(s)
Menna Shaaban Okila	+68 kg	Jovanović (MNE); L 2–3	—N/a	—N/a	Torres (ESP); L 1–3	—N/a	10

== Shooting ==
Egypt won one bronze medal in shooting.

== Table tennis ==
Egypt won two medals in table tennis.

== Taekwondo ==
Egypt won four medals in Taekwondo.

== Tennis ==
Egypt competed in tennis.

== Volleyball ==
Egypt competed in volleyball.

== Weightlifting ==
Egypt won ten medals in weightlifting.

Men

Athlete	Event	Snatch		Clean & Jerk	
Athlete	Event	Result	Rank	Result	Rank
Ahmed Eltamadi	61 kg	120	2nd place, silver medalist(s)	152	2nd place, silver medalist(s)
Ahmed Mohamed	73 kg	146	4	—	—
Karim Abokahla	89 kg	171	2nd place, silver medalist(s)	212	2nd place, silver medalist(s)
Ahmed Ali	102 kg	160	5	208	3rd place, bronze medalist(s)
Ahmed Gaber	+102 kg	170	3rd place, bronze medalist(s)	231	3rd place, bronze medalist(s)

Women

Athlete	Event	Snatch		Clean & Jerk	
Athlete	Event	Result	Rank	Result	Rank
Basma Ibrahim	59 kg	88	5	113	3rd place, bronze medalist(s)
Roufida Abdeltawwab	71 kg	91	7	118	5
Neama Said	71 kg	101	1st place, gold medalist(s)	125	1st place, gold medalist(s)

== Wrestling ==
Egypt won nine medals in wrestling.
