= Weightlifting at the 2009 Mediterranean Games =

The weightlifting competitions at the 2009 Mediterranean Games in Pescara, Italy took place between 26 June and 30 June at the Pala Rigopiano. Athletes competed in 22 events across 11 weight categories (7 for men and 4 for women). Three Women's (48 kg, 75 kg and +75 kg) and the Men's +105 kg category will not be held because too few nations applied.

== Doping cases ==
Nikolaos Kourtidis who won 2 gold medal in the men's 94 kg, and Konstantina Lapou who took silver in the women's 58-kg, tested positive after the competition.

For Nurcan Taylan who won 2 gold medals in the women's 53 kg the IWF invalidated all results between middle of 2008 to 2016.

== Medal table ==
* Host nation (Italy)

Rank	Nation	Gold	Silver	Bronze	Total
1	Egypt	6	5	6	17
2	Turkey	4	7	2	13
3	Tunisia	4	2	1	7
4	France	4	1	5	10
5	Albania	2	4	0	6
6	Syria	2	0	1	3
7	Cyprus	0	2	0	2
8	Italy*	0	1	1	2
9	Spain	0	0	3	3
10	Libya	0	0	2	2
11	Greece	0	0	1	1
Totals (11 entries)		22	22	22	66

== Medal summary ==
=== Men's events ===
Event		Gold	Silver	Bronze
56 kg	Snatch	Khalil El Maoui (TUN)	Sedat Artuç (TUR)	Gökhan Kılıç (TUR)
56 kg	Clean & Jerk	Khalil El Maoui (TUN)	Vito Dellino (ITA)	Mustafa Ramo (SYR)
62 kg	Snatch	Erol Bilgin (TUR)	Dimitris Minasidis (CYP)	Iván García (ESP)
62 kg	Clean & Jerk	Erol Bilgin (TUR)	Dimitris Minasidis (CYP)	Massimiliano Rubino (ITA)
69 kg	Snatch	Vencelas Dabaya (FRA)	Briken Calja (ALB)	Mohamed Abdelbaki (EGY)
69 kg	Clean & Jerk	Vencelas Dabaya (FRA)	Mohamed Abdelbaki (EGY)	Manuel Martín (ESP)
77 kg	Snatch	Erkand Qerimaj (ALB)	Tarek Yehia Abdelazim (EGY)	Semih Yağcı (TUR)
77 kg	Clean & Jerk	Ibrahim Abdelbaki (EGY)	Erkand Qerimaj (ALB)	Tarek Yehia Abdelazim (EGY)
85 kg	Snatch	İzzet İnce (TUR)	Ervis Tabaku (ALB)	Mohamed Eshtiwi (LBA)
85 kg	Clean & Jerk	Benjamin Hennequin (FRA)	Elsayed Hasona (EGY)	Mohamed Eshtiwi (LBA)
94 kg	Snatch	Gaber Mohamed (EGY)	David Matam (FRA)	Ahmed Sellou (EGY)
94 kg	Clean & Jerk	David Matam (FRA)	Gaber Mohamed (EGY)	José Juan Navarro (ESP)
105 kg	Snatch	Ahed Joughili (SYR)	Bünyamin Sudaş (TUR)	Grigor Satsian (GRE)
105 kg	Clean & Jerk	Ahed Joughili (SYR)	Bünyamin Sudaş (TUR)	Ahmed Mohamed (EGY)

=== Women's events ===
Event		Gold	Silver	Bronze
53 kg	Snatch	Soumaya Fatnassi (TUN)	Donia Abdelrahman (EGY)	Virginie Andrieux (FRA)
53 kg	Clean & Jerk	Soumaya Fatnassi (TUN)	Emine Bilgin (TUR)	Virginie Andrieux (FRA)
58 kg	Snatch	Romela Begaj (ALB)	Aylin Daşdelen (TUR)	Ahlem Elarbi (TUN)
58 kg	Clean & Jerk	Aylin Daşdelen (TUR)	Romela Begaj (ALB)	Agnes Chiquet (FRA)
63 kg	Snatch	Esmat Ahmed (EGY)	Sibel Şimşek (TUR)	Muslime Meral-Sunar (FRA)
63 kg	Clean & Jerk	Esmat Ahmed (EGY)	Sibel Şimşek (TUR)	Muslime Meral-Sunar (FRA)
69 kg	Snatch	Abeer Abdelrahman (EGY)	Hanene Ourfelli (TUN)	Fatma Abdelsayed (EGY)
69 kg	Clean & Jerk	Abeer Abdelrahman (EGY)	Hanene Ourfelli (TUN)	Fatma Abdelsayed (EGY)
