= Boxing at the 2009 Mediterranean Games =

Boxing competition

- Location: Pescara, Italy
- Dates: 26 June – 5 July 2009

Boxing was one of the sports held at the 2009 Mediterranean Games.

== Medalists ==
Event	Gold	Silver	Bronze
Light Flyweight (–48 kilograms)	Jeremy Beccu (FRA)	Kelvin de la Nieve (ESP)	Alfonso Pinto (ITA) Ferhat Pehlivan (TUR)
Flyweight (–51 kilograms)	Nordine Oubaali (FRA)	Francisco Torrijos (ESP)	Vincenzo Picardi (ITA) Samir Brahimi (ALG)
Bantamweight (–54 kilograms)	Vittorio Parrinello (ITA)	Abdelhalim Ouradi (ALG)	Wessam Salamana (SYR) Hicham Mesbahi (MAR)
Featherweight (–57 kilograms)	Kerem Gurgen (TUR)	Branimir Stanković (SRB)	Alessio di Savino (ITA) Mohamed Amine Oudahi (ALG)
Lightweight (–60 kilograms)	Domenico Valentino (ITA)	Filip Palić (CRO)	Yakup Kilic (TUR) Ljubomir Marjanović (SRB)
Light welterweight (–64 kilograms)	Alexis Vastine (FRA)	Driss Moussaid (MAR)	Hamza Hassini (TUN) Yassin Gaber al-Sheairy (EGY)
Welterweight (–69 kilograms)	Onder Sipal (TUR)	Medhi Khalsi (MAR)	Velibor Vidić (BIH) Hossam Bakr Abdin (EGY)
Middleweight (–75 kilograms)	Rachid Hamani (ALG)	Adem Kilici (TUR)	Luca Podda (ITA) Mathieu Bauderlique (FRA)
Light Heavyweight (–81 kilograms)	Boško Drašković (MNE)	Abdelhafid Benchebla (ALG)	Onder Ozgul (TUR) Yahia Elmekachari (TUN)
Heavyweight (–91 kilograms)	Clemente Russo (ITA)	Mourad Sahraoui (TUN)	Mohammad Ghosoun Sumar (SYR) Mohamed Arjaoui (MAR)
Super heavyweight (+91 kilograms)	Roberto Cammarelle (ITA)	Marko Tomasović (CRO)	Alen Beganović (MNE) Mohamed Homrani (TUN)

== Medal table ==
Rank	Nation	Gold	Silver	Bronze	Total
1	Italy (ITA)	4	0	4	8
2	France (FRA)	3	0	1	4
3	Turkey (TUR)	2	1	3	6
4	Algeria (ALG)	1	2	2	5
5	Montenegro (MNE)	1	0	1	2
6	Morocco (MAR)	0	2	2	4
7	Croatia (CRO)	0	2	0	2
7	Spain (ESP)	0	2	0	2
9	Tunisia (TUN)	0	1	3	4
10	Serbia (SRB)	0	1	1	2
11	Egypt (EGY)	0	0	2	2
11	Syria (SYR)	0	0	2	2
13	Bosnia and Herzegovina (BIH)	0	0	1	1
Totals (13 entries)		11	11	22	44
