= Cycling at the 2009 Mediterranean Games =

- Venue: Pescara Urban Circuit
- Dates: 30 June and 3 July

The cycling competitions at the 2009 Mediterranean Games took place from 30 June to 3 July at the Pescara urban circuit.

Athletes competed in three events.

== Medal summary ==
=== Medalists ===
Event	Gold		Silver		Bronze	
Men's road race	Enrico Peruffo; Italy	3h 08' 15"	Marko Kump; Slovenia	s.t.	Andrea Guardini; Italy	s.t.
Men's time trial	Adriano Malori; Italy	28' 28"	Tony Gallopin; France	+40"	Ioannis Tamouridis; Greece	+59"
Women's road race	Luisa Tamanini; Italy	1h 16' 18"	Julie Krasniak; France	+4"	Giorgia Bronzini; Italy	+10"

=== Medal table ===
* Host nation (Italy)

Rank	Nation	Gold	Silver	Bronze	Total
1	Italy*	3	0	2	5
2	France	0	2	0	2
3	Slovenia	0	1	0	1
4	Greece	0	0	1	1
Totals (4 entries)		3	3	3	9
