= Wrestling at the 2009 Mediterranean Games =

Wrestling competition

- Venue: Huércal de Almería Sports Hall
- Dates: 26–29 June

The Wrestling competition at the 2009 Mediterranean Games was held in the Huércal de Almería Sports Hall in Pescara, Italy from June 26 to June 29, 2005.

== Medal table ==
* Host nation (Italy)

Rank	Nation	Gold	Silver	Bronze	Total
1	Turkey	7	2	4	13
2	Egypt	2	2	0	4
3	Italy*	2	1	6	9
4	Serbia	2	1	2	5
5	Greece	1	3	7	11
6	Spain	1	1	3	5
7	Tunisia	1	1	2	4
8	Croatia	1	0	1	2
9	France	0	3	4	7
10	Syria	0	3	2	5
11	Bosnia and Herzegovina	0	0	1	1
11	Montenegro	0	0	1	1
Totals (12 entries)		17	17	33	67

== Medalists ==
=== Men's freestyle ===
Event	Gold	Silver	Bronze
55 kg	(Turkey) Sezar Akgül	(Syria) Firas Alalli Alrifai	(France) Hamza Fatah (Italy) Federico Manea
60 kg	(Egypt) Hassan Ibrahim	(Turkey) Mustafa Kartal	(Spain) Agustin Sanchez Parra (Italy) Federico Manea
66 kg	(Turkey) Muhammed İlkhan	(Syria) Mazen Kdmanie	(Tunisia) Mohamed Ali Ben Ayech (Greece) Anastasios Akritidis
84 kg	(Turkey) Ali İmamoğlu	(France) Said Itaev	(Spain) Javier Ramos Blasco (Greece) Theodosios Pavlidis
96 kg	(Egypt) Saleh Emara	(Syria) Raja Al-Karrad	(Bosnia and Herzegovina) Kemal Tajic (Greece) Orestis Leonidis
120 kg	(Turkey) Fatih Çakıroğlu	(Greece) Ioannis Arzoumanidis	(Italy) Francesco Miano-Petta (Serbia) Radomir Petković

=== Men's Greco-Roman ===
Event	Gold	Silver	Bronze
55 kg	(Serbia) Kristijan Fris	(Egypt) Mostafa Mohamed	(Greece) Grigorios Anastasiadis (Turkey) Erhan Karakuş
60 kg	(Serbia) Davor Štefanek	(Egypt) Sayed Hamed	(Italy) Paolo Fucile (Turkey) Soner Sucu
66 kg	(Greece) Gievgkeni Pentorets	(Serbia) Aleksandar Maksimović	(Turkey) Abdullah Coşkun (Syria) Moustafa Alnakdali
74 kg	(Turkey) Şeref Tüfenk	(France) Christophe Guenot	(Croatia) Neven Zugaj (Greece) Ioannis Spyridakis
84 kg	(Croatia) Nenad Žugaj	(Italy) Andrea Minguzzi	(France) Melonin Noumonvi (Turkey) Akif Canbaş
96 kg	(Turkey) Serkan Özden	(Greece) Theodoros Tounousidis	(Montenegro) Vladimir Radosaulevic (Italy) Beniamino Scibilia
120 kg	(Turkey) Rıza Kayaalp	(Greece) Panagiotis Papadopoulos	(Italy) Rocco Daniele Ficara (Serbia) Radomir Petković

=== Women's freestyle ===
Event	Gold	Silver	Bronze
48 kg	(Tunisia) Naziha Hamza	(Spain) Sara Sanchez Parra	(Italy) Silvia Felice (France) Melanie Lesaffre
51 kg	(Italy) Francine De Paola	(Turkey) Dilek Atakol	(Tunisia) Hedia Tabelsi (France) Aurelie Basset
55 kg	(Spain) Karima Sanchez Ramis	(Tunisia) Marwa Amri	(Greece) Panagiota Antonopoulou (Italy) Valentina Minguzzi
59 kg	(Italy) Sabrina Esposito	(France) Meryem Selloum	(Spain) Aurora Fajardo Prieto (Greece) Evangeli Chrysi
