= Montenegro at the Mediterranean Games =

- IOC code: MNE
- NOC: Montenegrin Olympic Committee
- Medals Ranked 23rd: Gold 5 Silver 10 Bronze 13 Total 28

Mediterranean Games appearances (overview)
- 2009; 2013; 2018; 2022; 2026

Other related appearances
- Yugoslavia (1951–1991); Serbia and Montenegro (1997–2005)

Montenegro participated at 2009 Mediterranean Games, for the first time after the separation of Serbia and Montenegro. As of 2026, Montenegrin athletes have won a total of 28 medals under their flag.

== Medal tables ==
Games	Athletes	Gold	Silver	Bronze	Total	Rank
1951–1991	as part of Yugoslavia (YUG)					
1997–2005	as part of Serbia and Montenegro (SCG)					
(Italy) 2009 Pescara	107	2	2	3	7	16
(Turkey) 2013 Mersin	40	1	1	3	5	15
(Spain) 2018 Tarragona	57	0	1	2	3	22
(Algeria) 2022 Oran	32	1	4	2	7	20
(Italy) 2026 Taranto	55	1	2	3	6	18
Total		5	10	13	28	23

== Medals by sport ==
Sport	Gold	Silver	Bronze	Total
Athletics	2	0	2	4
Boxing	1	2	4	7
Bocce	1	1	0	2
Judo	1	0	1	2
Karate	0	3	2	5
Water polo	0	2	1	3
Handball	0	1	1	2
Tennis	0	1	0	1
Boules	0	0	1	1
Wrestling	0	0	1	1
Totals (10 entries)	5	10	13	28

== See also ==
- Montenegro at the Olympics
- Montenegro at the Paralympics
- Sport in Montenegro
