= 2009 Mediterranean Games medal table =

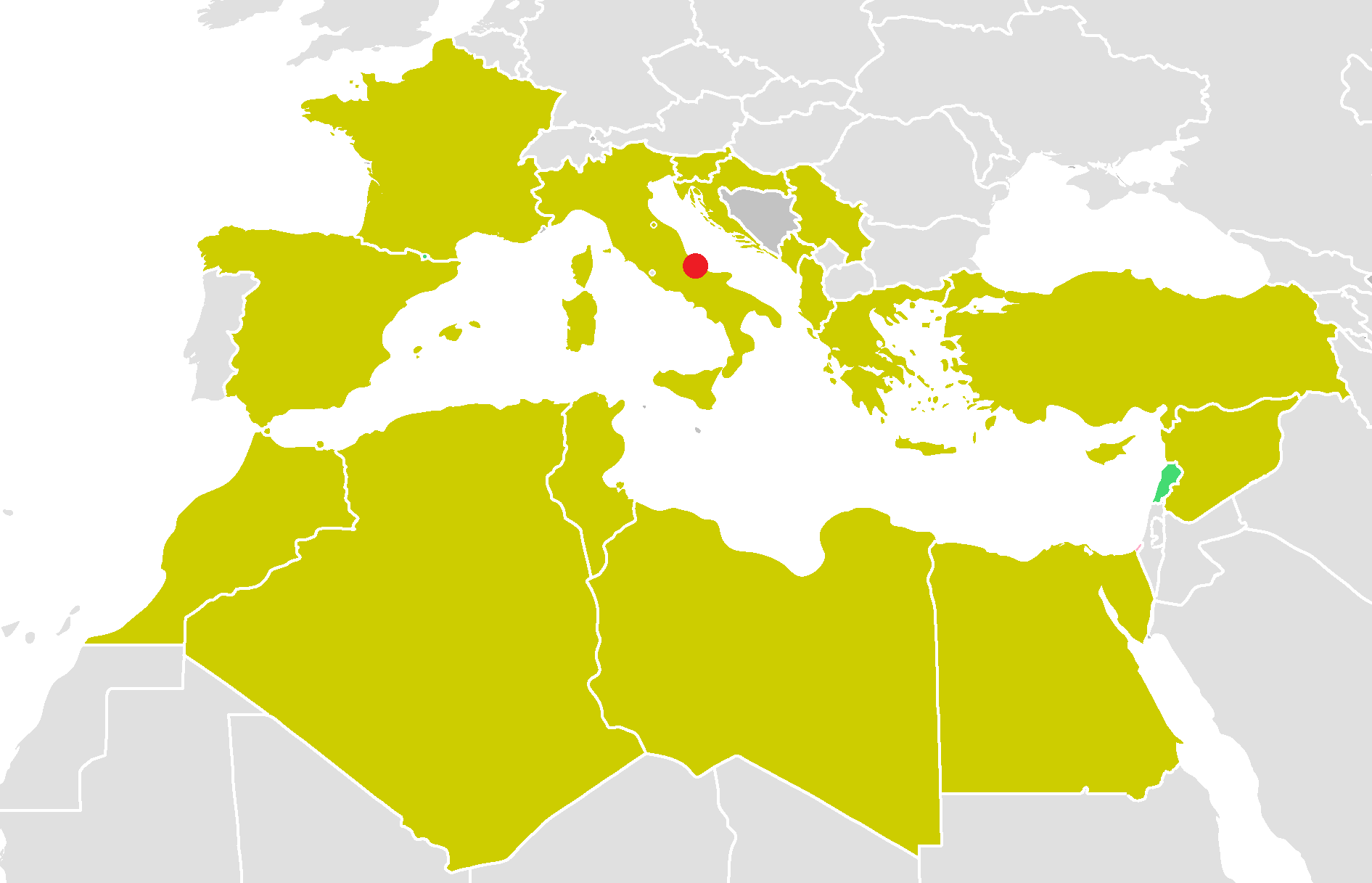
Map of the International Committee of Mediterranean Games (ICMG) member countries showing the achievements of each nation during the 2009 Mediterranean Games in Pescara, Italy. Gold for countries achieving at least one gold medal. Silver for countries achieving at least one silver medal. Green for countries that did not win a medal. Grey for countries that are not part of the ICMG. A red circle displays the host city.

The 2009 Mediterranean Games, officially known as the XVI Mediterranean Games (Italian: XVI Giochi del Mediterraneo), was a multi-sport event held in Pescara, Italy, from 26 June to 5 July 2009. A record total of 3,368 athletes—2,183 men and 1,185 women—representing 23 National Olympic Committees (NOCs) participated in the Games. The number of competing NOCs was the highest in Mediterranean Games history, alongside Tunis 2001.

Athletes from every participating NOC, except Andorra and Lebanon, won medals. Among the medalling NOCs, 18 won at least one gold medal. Tunisian swimmer Oussama Mellouli won five gold medals, making him the most successful athlete of the Pescara 2009 Games. French gymnast Youna Dufournet won four golds and one silver, becoming the most decorated female athlete at these Games. In the 400 metres freestyle event, Athens Olympics silver medallist Federica Pellegrini of Italy won gold and broke the world record. She won a second gold medal as part of the relay team in the 4×100 metres freestyle event. Spanish swimmer Aschwin Wildeboer Faber set a new world record in the 100 metres backstroke and won four gold medals. Maltese shooter William Chetcuti won his nation's only medal, a silver in the men's double trap. Yann Siccardi won the only medal for Monaco at the 2009 Mediterranean Games, a silver in the men's 60 kg event of judo.

A total of 782 medals (243 gold, 244 silver and 295 bronze) were awarded. Athletics, swimming, weightlifting and wrestling accounted for almost half of the total medals awarded. Five NOCs—Greece, Tunisia, Morocco, Cyprus and San Marino—improved their position in the medal table compared to the 2005 Mediterranean Games. The host nation, Italy, topped the medal table for a record eleventh time in the history of the Games, having collected 64 gold medals; it also secured the most bronze medals (63) and the most medals overall (176). The Italian delegation also obtained the most medals in athletics, bowls, boxing, canoeing, fencing, karate, road cycling, rowing, shooting, swimming and volleyball, and tied for the most in football, judo, rhythmic gymnastics and water polo. France led the silver medal count with 53, and with 48 golds, 39 bronzes and a total of 140 medals, finished second on the medal table. Spanish athletes claimed 83 medals in total (including 28 gold), earning third spot on the table.

== Medal table ==
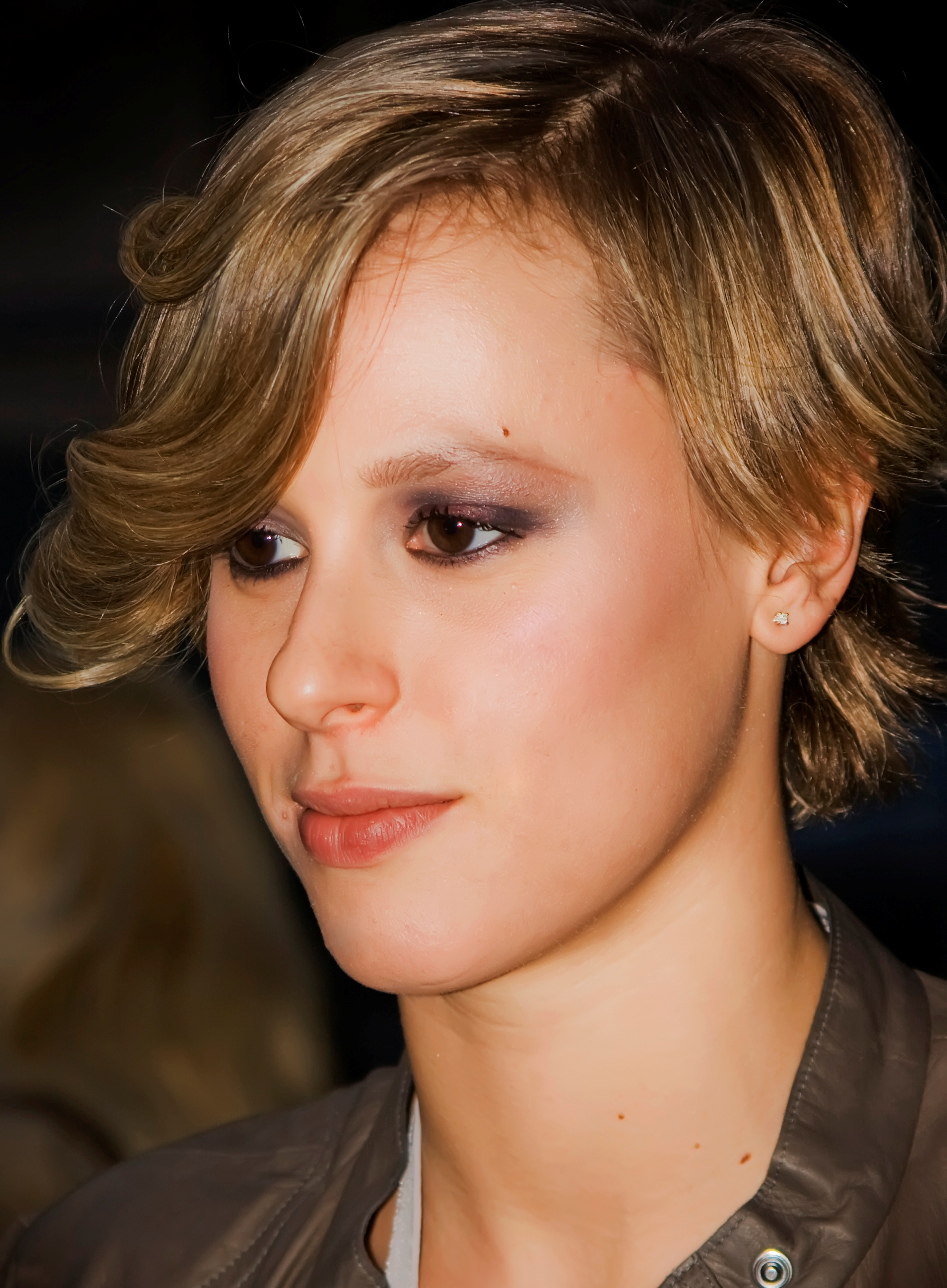
Federica Pellegrini broke the world record in the 400 metres freestyle event.

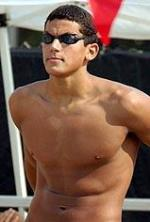
Oussama Mellouli won five gold medals in swimming.

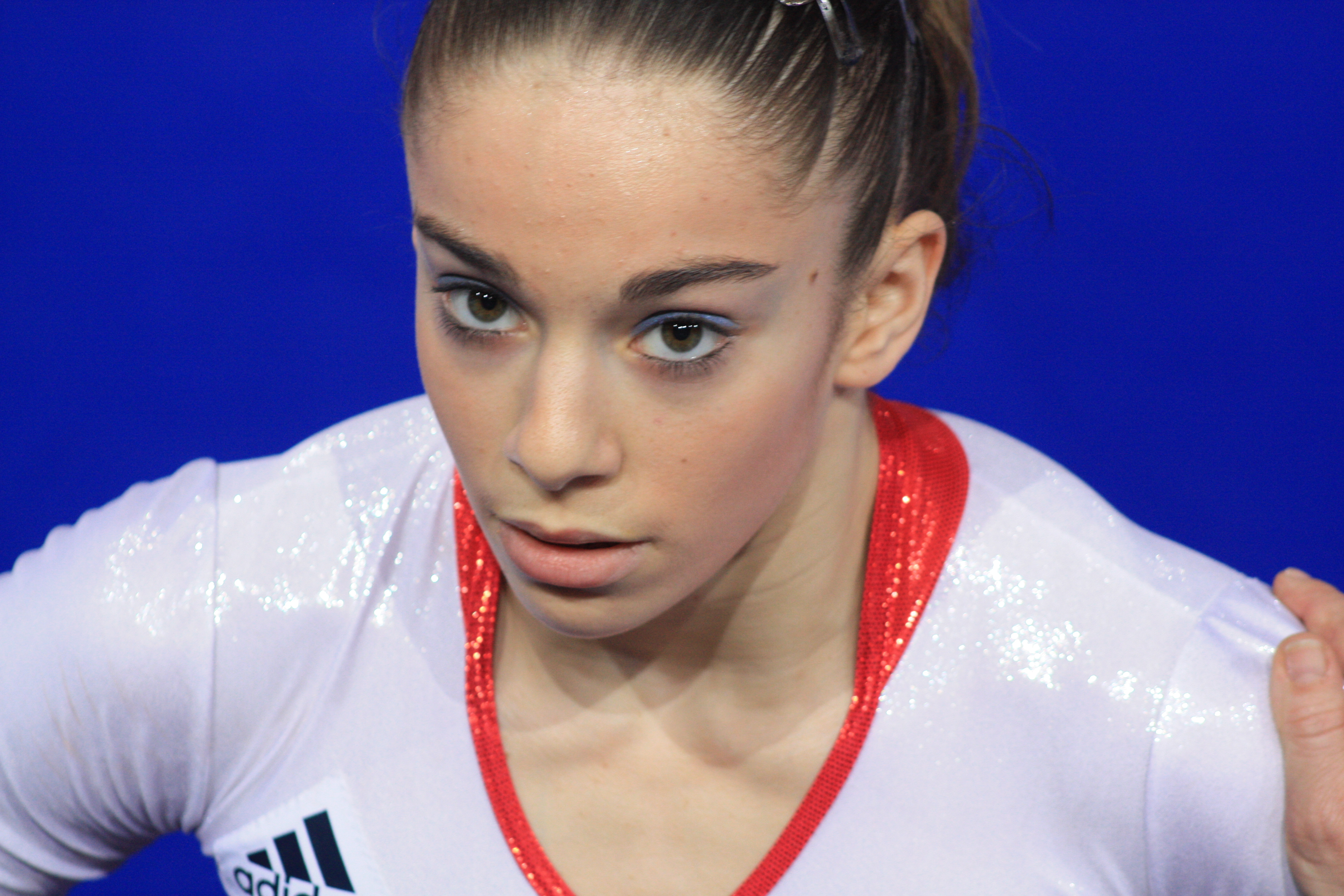
French gymnast Youna Dufournet won the balance beam silver medal.

The ranking in this table is consistent with Comité international des Jeux méditerranéens convention in its published medal tables. By default, the table is ordered by the number of gold medals the athletes from a nation have won (in this context, a nation is an entity represented by a NOC). The number of silver medals is taken into consideration next, followed by the number of bronze medals. If nations are still tied, equal ranking is given; they are listed alphabetically by IOC country code.

The total number of bronze medals is greater than the total number of gold or silver medals because two bronze medals were awarded per event in four sports: boxing, judo, karate and wrestling. In the women's 50 m freestyle event of swimming, a tie for the second position between two swimmers from Italy meant that two silver medals (and no bronze) were awarded.

Key

* Host nation

Rank	Nation	Gold	Silver	Bronze	Total
1	Italy (ITA)*	64	49	63	176
2	France (FRA)	48	53	41	142
3	Spain (ESP)	28	21	34	83
4	Greece (GRE)	19	14	31	64
5	Turkey (TUR)	18	20	25	63
6	Tunisia (TUN)	15	9	13	37
7	Egypt (EGY)	11	11	12	34
8	Serbia (SRB)	9	13	13	35
9	Slovenia (SLO)	7	9	10	26
10	Morocco (MAR)	6	9	6	21
11	Croatia (CRO)	5	12	11	28
12	Cyprus (CYP)	3	4	1	8
13	Albania (ALB)	2	4	0	6
14	Algeria (ALG)	2	3	12	17
15	Syria (SYR)	2	3	7	12
16	Montenegro (MNE)	2	2	3	7
17	San Marino (SMR)	1	3	2	6
18	Libya (LBA)	1	0	6	7
19	Bosnia and Herzegovina (BIH)	0	3	5	8
20	Malta (MLT)	0	1	0	1
20	Monaco (MON)	0	1	0	1
Total		243	244	295	782

== Change ==
Nurcan Taylan DQ and all results were invalidated from 2009 to 2016.
