= Gymnastics at the 2009 Mediterranean Games =

There were two gymnastics competitions at the 2009 Mediterranean Games:

- Artistic gymnastics at the 2009 Mediterranean Games
- Rhythmic gymnastics at the 2009 Mediterranean Games
