= Kerem Gürgen =

Turkish boxer

Personal information
- Nationality: Turkish

Sport
- Country: Turkey
- Sport: Amateur boxing
- Event: Featherweight
Medal record
Mediterranean Games
Gold medal – first place	2009 Pescara	Featherweight
World University Boxing Championships
Silver medal – second place	2008 Kazan	Featherweight

Kerem Gürgen is a Turkish amateur boxer in the featherweight (57 kg) division. He is currently a member of the squad at Gençlik Spor İl Müdürlüğü (GSİM) in Siirt.

== Career ==
Gürgen boxed a gold medal in the featherweight division at the 2009 Mediterranean Games in Pescara, Italy.

At the 3rd World University Championship held between 20 and 27 September 2008 in Kazan, Russia, he gained the silver medal.
