= Simon Delestre =

French equestrian (born 1981)

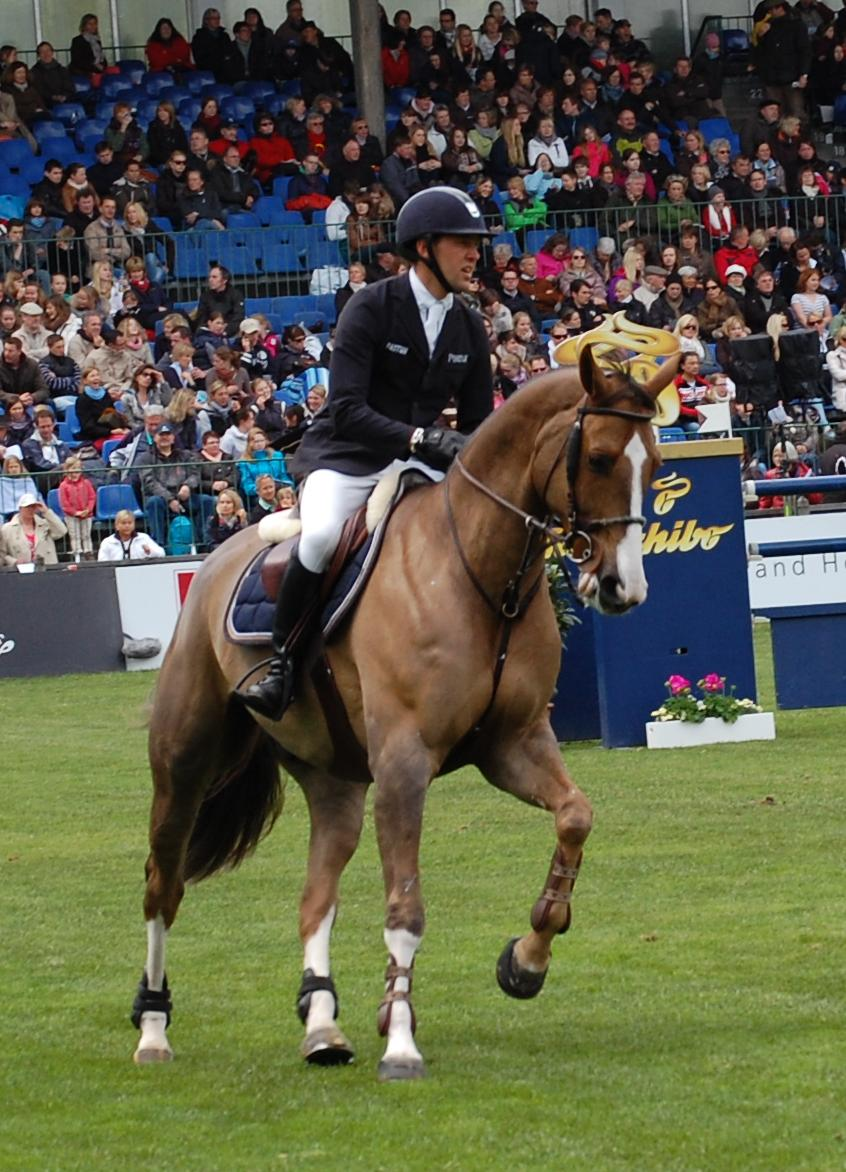
- Delestre on Napoli du Ry in 2012

Personal information
- Nationality: France
- Discipline: Show jumping
- Born: 21 June 1981 (age 45); Metz
- Height: 1.75 m (5 ft 9 in)
- Weight: 67 kg (148 lb)
- Horse(s): Cauletto, Napoli du Ry, Valentino Velvet, Ciana Z, Queldam Denfer, Ryan des Hayettes, Whisper, Qlassic Bois Margot, Quiness du Mezel, Armani
Medal record
Olympic Games
Representing France
Bronze medal – third place	2024 Paris	Team jumping
European Championships
Bronze medal – third place	2015 Aachen	Individual jumping
FEI Nations Cup
Gold medal – first place	2013 Barcelona	Team jumping
Mediterranean Games
Gold medal – first place	2009 Pescara	Individual jumping
Gold medal – first place	2009 Pescara	Team jumping
Silver medal – second place	2005 Almeria	Team jumping
European Young Riders Championship
Gold medal – first place	2000	Team jumping
Junior European Championships
Bronze medal – third place	1999 Hickstead	Team jumping
France Junior Championships
Gold medal – first place	1999	Individual jumping

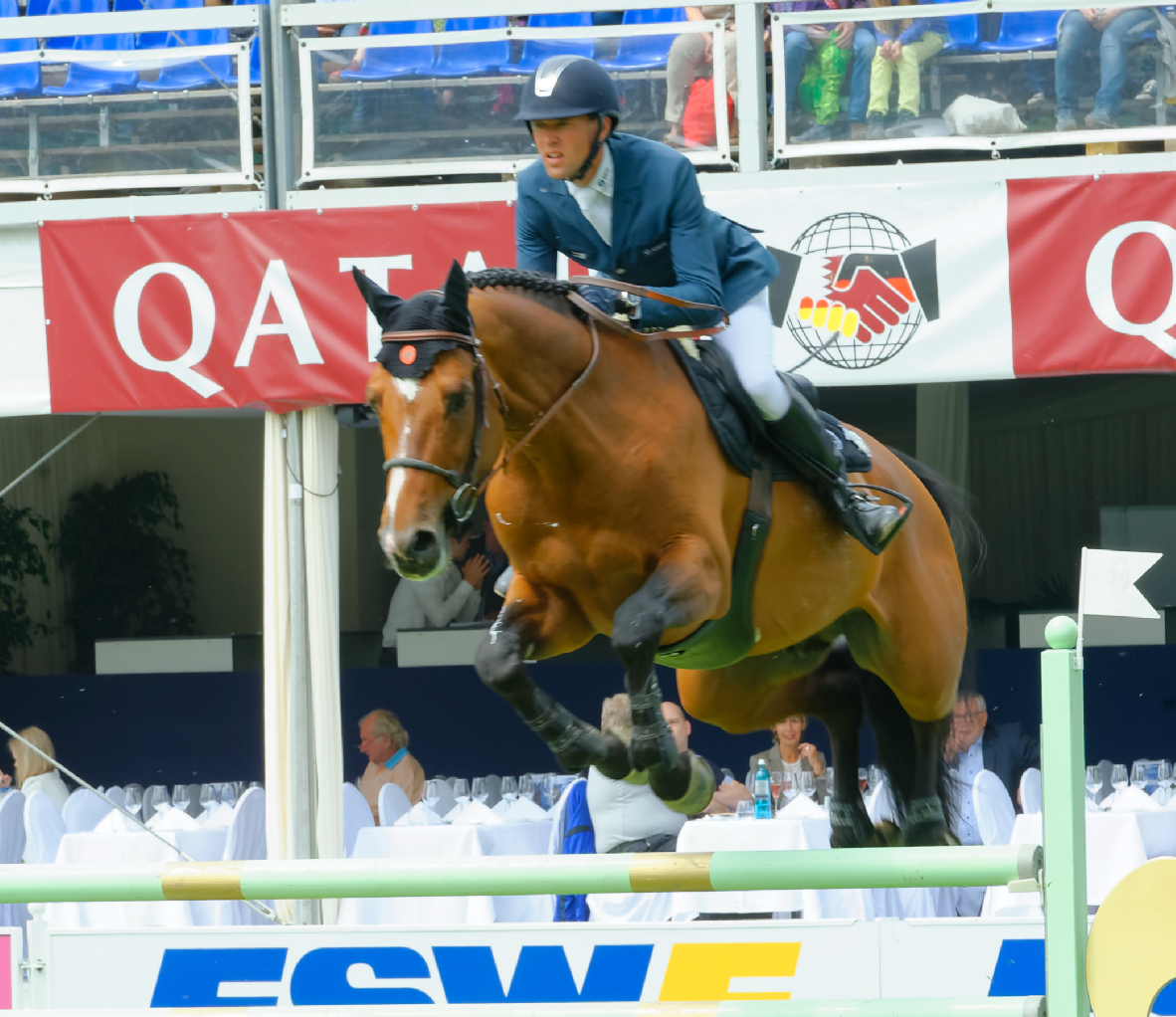
Simon Delestre with Quidman Denfer at Wiesbaden CSIYH* 2015

Simon Delestre (born 21 June 1981) is a French equestrian. His specialty is show jumping, either individually or as part of a team. Delestre ranks twenty-five on the FEI Rolex Ranking List.

== Personal life ==
Delestre was born 21 June 1981 in Metz, France, the son of Marcel Delestre. His father, a former international rider, got Delestre interested in equestrianism at a young age. Delestre tried many sports as a child, but a pony named Panama du Cassou HN gave him a taste for riding.

Delestre's stables are located in the structure of his parents Marcel and Magalis' home in Solgne.

Recently when asked if he had any hobbies, Delestre said "No time for that."

== Career ==
After obtaining a Bachelor of Science in 1999, Delestre was crowned the gold medalist at the France Junior Championships and continued that year to win bronze as part of a team in the European Junior Championships. The following year he won the gold medal with his team at the European Championship for Young Riders. Delestre then continued his career in both Pro and Pro Elite races, as well as international events such as the Nations Cup, CSI-5*, and the World Cup Circuit.

In 2011, Delestre was selected to be a reserve rider at the European Championships in Madrid, Spain, where the French team has won three silver medals. The same year, Delestre managed to qualify for the World Cup Final in Leipzig, Germany, where he ranked sixteenth with Couletto. At the end of 2011, Delestre manages to be in the Top Ten of the FEI Rolex Ranking List, allowing him to participate in the Final Top Ten IJRC of Paris. For that race, he finished eighth on Napoli du Ry. Delestre participated in two World Cup finals, where he got tenth in Stuttgart and fourth in Zurich. However, he failed to qualify for the finals in Hertogensbosch, Netherlands.

Delestre qualified for the 2012 London Olympics on Napoli du Ry, where his coach was Henk Nooren. He finished nineteenth in the individual jumping finals and was part of the French team for team jumping, which came in twelfth.

Delestre is perhaps best known for his prowess in the Mediterranean Games, where he has won two gold medals and one silver, both as part of a team and individually.

=== Placements ===
- 1999
  - Junior Champion of France in Fontainebleau with Bella de Charmois
  - Part of the bronze medal team at the European Junior Championships in Münchwilen, Switzerland, with Eddy de Villiers
- 2000
  - Part of the gold medal team at the European Championship for Young Riders in Hartpury, United Kingdom, with Didam de la Ressée
  - Winner of CSIOY Reims with Didam de la Ressée
- 2001
  - Part of the fourth-place team at the European Championship for Young Riders in Gijón, Spain, with Faraon de la Ressée
- 2002
  - Part of the fifth-place team at the CSIO-4* Ebelsberg in Linz, Austria, with Didam de la Ressée
  - Third place at the Grand Prix for CSIO-4* Ebelsberg in Linz, Austria, with Didam de la Ressée
  - Winner of the Grand Prix for CSIOY in Lummen, Belgium, with JPC Rexito Z
- 2003
  - Seventh place at the Grand Prix for CSI-3* in Lons le Saunier with Hello Arcy
  - Winner of the small Grand Prix for CSI-3* in Vittel with Lucky Luck C
  - The Grand Prize Winner for Pro 1 in Montbéliard with Iceberg Forestry
- 2004
  - Second place at the Grand Prix Pro in Palaiseau with Holga of Bignons
  - Second place at the Power Pro with Franconville Istar of Vesquerie
- 2005
  - Winner of the Grand Prix for CSI-3* in Dunkirk with Unpublished Balme
  - Sixth place at the Grand Prix for CSI-3* in Bourge en Bresse with Unpublished Balme
  - Part of the silver medal team at the Mediterranean Games with Unpublished Balme
  - Eighth place individually at the Mediterranean Games with Unpublished Balme
- 2006
  - Part of the winning team at CSIO-5* in Rome, Italy, with Unpublished Balme
  - Part of the second-place team at CSIO-5* in Rotterdam, Netherlands, with Unpublished Balme
  - Ninth place at the Grand Prix World Cup of the CHI-5* in Geneva, Switzerland, with Unpublished Balme
- 2007
  - Winner of the Grand Prix at the 1m40 in Cheminot with Melody Burning
  - Winner of the Grand Prix at the 1m45 in Maillys with Melody Burning
  - 4th in the World Championships of six years in Lanaken, Belgium, with Neptune's Cottage
  - 5th in the World Championships of seven years in Lanaken, Belgium, with Melody Burning
- 2008
  - Winner of the Grand Prix Pro Elite 1.50m in Sainte-Mere-Eglise with Oda
  - Winner of the Grand Prix Pro Elite 1.50m in Cluny with Unpublished Balme
  - Seventh place at the Grand Prix Pro Elite 1.50m in Cluny with Couletto
- 2009
  - Part of the winning team at CSIO-5 in Gijón with Melody Burning
  - Individual gold medal at the Mediterranean Games in Pescara, Italy with Melody Burning
  - Part of the gold medal team at the Mediterranean Games in Pescara, Italy with Melody Burning
  - Seventh place at the Grand Prix for CSI-5* at Paris-Villepinte with Couletto
- 2010
  - Fifth place at the Grand Prix World Cup for CSI-5* in Mechelen, Belgium, with Couletto
  - Winner of the Grand Prix for CSI-3* in Montpellier, France, with Oslo du Chavet
  - Second place at the Grand Prix for CSI-5* in Brussels (Audi Masters) with Couletto
  - Third place at the Grand Prix for CSI-5* in Paris (Grand Masters) with Napoli du Ry
  - Winner of the Grand Prix for CSI-4* in Antwerp, Belgium, with Napoli du Ry
- 2011
  - Tenth place at the Grand Prix World Cup for CSI-5* in Stuttgart, Germany, with Napoli du Ry
  - Third place at the Grand Prix for CSI-5* in Madrid, Spain, with Napoli du Ry
  - Winner of the French Tour EADS at the Global Champions Tour in Cannes with Napoli du Ry
  - Sixteenth place at the World Cup Final in Leipzig, Germany, with Couletto
  - Fifth place at the Grand Prix World Cup for CSI-5* in 's-Hertogenbosch, Netherlands, with Couletto
- 2012
  - Fourth place at the Grand Prix World Cup for CSI-5* in with Napoli du Ry
  - Twelfth place at the Grand Prix of the Global Champions Tour in Doha, Qatar, with Valentino Velvet
  - Winner of the small Grand Prix for CSIO-5* in La Baule-Escoublac, France, with Whisper
  - Third place at the Grand Prix for CSIO-5* in Rotterdam, Netherlands, with Napoli du Ry
  - Nineteenth place for the 2012 London Olympics individual jumping with Napoli du Ry
  - Part of the twelfth place team for the London 2012 Olympics team jumping with Napoli du Ry

== Notable horses ==
Name	Age	Gender	Color	Breed	Sire	Dam	Damsire	References
Couletto	13 years	Stallion	Gray dappled	Oldenburger	Couleur Rubin	Panarina	Caletto	
Napoli du Ry	12 years	Gelding	Chestnut	Oldenburger	Baloubet du Rouet	La Donna	Silvio I	
Valentino Velvet	11 years	Stallion	Dark bay	Warmblood	C Indoctro	Riadne Velvet	Burggraaf	
Whisper	10 years	Mare	Black pangared	Warmblood	Gentleman	Kiovili D	Sit This One Out	
Qlassic Bois Margot	9 years	Stallion	Black pangared	French Saddle Pony	L'Arc de Triomphe*Bois Margot	Decibelle du Roc	Galoubet A	
Quiness du Mezel	9 years	Mare	Chestnut	French Saddle Pony	Elan de la Cour*HN	Égée du Mezel	Tenor de Conde*HN	
Cap Kennedy Bois Margot	9 years	Stallion	Grey	Holsteiner	Cassini II	Karina V	Cantus	
Ryan des Hayettes	8 years	Stallion	Chestnut	French Saddle Pony	Hugo Gesmeray	Ryonne des Hayettes Z	Ryon d'Anzex	
Stardust Quinhon	7 years	Mare	Dark brown bay	Selle Français	Calvaro	Longane Quinhon	Cabdulla du Tillard	
Shere Khan du Banney	7 years	Stallion	Chestnut	Selle Français	Eyken des Fontenis	Fany de St Pair	Papyrus de Chivre	
Ho-Go Van De Padenborre	6 years	Stallion	Bay	Belgian Warmblood	Darco	Dirka Van De Padenborre	Chin Chin	
Hennessey Van De Padenborre	6 years	Mare	Chestnut	Belgian Warmblood	Quidam de Revel	Delicieuse Van De Padenborre	Chin Chin	
