= Croatia at the 2009 Mediterranean Games =

- IOC code: CRO
- NOC: Croatian Olympic Committee

in Pescara
- Medals Ranked 11th: Gold 5 Silver 12 Bronze 11 Total 28

Mediterranean Games appearances (overview)
- 1993; 1997; 2001; 2005; 2009; 2013; 2018; 2022

Other related appearances
- Yugoslavia (1951–1991)

Croatia competed at the 2009 Mediterranean Games held in Pescara, Italy, from 25 June to 5 July 2009. This was the nation's fifth consecutive appearance at the Mediterranean Games. It won 5 gold, 12 silver and 11 bronze medals.

== Medalists ==
Medal	Name	Sport	Event	Date
Gold	Nenad Žugaj	Wrestling	Men's Greco-Roman 84 kg	26 June
Gold	Snježana Pejčić	Shooting	Women's 50 m rifle 3 positions	27 June
Gold	Mario Todorović	Swimming	Men's 50 m butterfly	30 June
Gold	Petra Volf	Karate	Women's −68 kg	30 June
Gold	Croatia national basketball team: Damir Rančić; Jakov Vladović; Rok Stipčević; Krunoslav Simon; Lukša Andrić; Petar Babić; Marko Car; Ante Tomić; Damjan Rudež; Luka Žorić; Jure Lalić; Drago Pašalić	Basketball	Men's Basketball	4 July
Silver	Mario Vekić	Rowing	Men's single sculls	28 June
Silver	Jelena Kovačević	Karate	Women's −55 kg	30 June
Silver	Andrej Gaćina; Roko Tošić	Table tennis	Men's team	30 June
Silver	Andrej Gaćina	Table tennis	Men's singles	1 July
Silver	Filip Ude	Gymnastics	Men's floor	2 July
Silver	Filip Palić	Boxing	Men's lightweight	2 July
Silver	Marko Tomasović	Boxing	Men's super heavyweight	2 July
Silver	Vera Begić	Athletics	Women's discus throw	3 July
Silver	Stjepan Janić	Canoeing	Men's K-1 500 m	4 July
Silver	Tina Mihelić	Sailing	Women's Laser Radial	4 July
Silver	Tonči Stipanović	Sailing	Men's Laser	4 July
Silver	Šime Fantela; Igor Marenić	Sailing	Men's 470	4 July
Bronze	Neven Žugaj	Wrestling	Men's Greco-Roman 74 kg	26 June
Bronze	Sanja Jovanović	Swimming	Women's 50 m backstroke	27 June
Bronze	Mirna Rajle Brođanac	Rowing	Women's lightweight single sculls	28 June
Bronze	Jurica Grabušić	Athletics	Men's 110 m hurdles	30 June
Bronze	Ana Sundov; Gordana Dagelić	Bowls	Women's Raffa-Doubles	30 June
Bronze	Danil Dondjoni	Karate	Men's −60 kg	30 June
Bronze	Nikolina Horvat	Athletics	Women's 400 m hurdles	1 July
Bronze	Croatia women's national basketball team: Jelena Ivezić; Anđa Jelavić; Tina Periša; Marta Čakić; Josipa Bura; Neda Lokas; Iva Ciglar; Antonija Mišura; Iva Slišković; Mirna Mazić; Luca Ivanković; Sena Pavetić	Basketball	Women's Basketball	2 July
Bronze	Nedžad Mulabegović	Athletics	Men's shot put	3 July
Bronze	Stjepan Janić	Canoeing	Men's K-1 1000 m	3 July
Bronze	Croatia women's national volleyball team: Ana Grbac; Jelena Balić; Marina Miletić; Mirela Delić; Sandra Popović; Cecilia Dujić; Mia Jerkov; Ilijana Dugandžić; Biljana Gligorović; Senna Ušić Jogunica; Ivana Miloš; Maja Poljak	Volleyball	Women's volleyball	4 July

== Athletics ==
Key

- Note–Ranks given for track events are within the athlete's heat only
- Q = Qualified for the next round
- q = Qualified for the next round as a fastest loser or, in field events, by position without achieving the qualifying target
- NR = National record
- N/A = Round not applicable for the event
- Bye = Athlete not required to compete in round

Men
Track & road events

Athlete	Event	Semifinal		Final	
Athlete	Event	Result	Rank	Result	Rank
Željko Vincek	400 m	46.85	4	did not advance	
Jure Božinović	800 m	1:50:34	5	did not advance	
Jurica Grabušić	110 m hurdles	13.81	1 Q	13.82	3rd place, bronze medalist(s)

Field events

Athlete	Event	Final	
Athlete	Event	Distance	Position
András Haklits	Hammer throw	71.31	7
Martin Marić	Discus throw	60.60	6
Nedžad Mulabegović	Shot put	19.85	3rd place, bronze medalist(s)

Women
Track & road events

Athlete	Event	Semifinal		Final	
Athlete	Event	Result	Rank	Result	Rank
Maja Golub	100 m	11.65	4	did not advance	
Anita Banović	400 m	53.91	4 q	53.57	5
Danijela Grgić	400 m	54.67	4 q	did not start	
Nikolina Horvat	400 m hurdles	—		56.97	3rd place, bronze medalist(s)

Field events

Athlete	Event	Final	
Athlete	Event	Distance	Position
Vera Begić	Discus throw	60.29	2nd place, silver medalist(s)

== Basketball ==
=== Men's tournament ===
Group A

Morocco	63–75	Croatia

Croatia	82–68	Greece

Croatia	71–69	Serbia

	Team	Pts	Pl	W	L	PF	PA	PD
1.	Croatia	6	3	3	0	228	200	+28
2.	Greece	5	3	2	1	255	236	+19
3.	Serbia	4	3	1	2	216	228	−12
4.	Morocco	3	3	0	3	213	248	−35

Quarterfinal

Croatia	94–70	Albania

Semifinal

Italy	104–108	Croatia

Final

Greece	60 – 72	Croatia

=== Women's tournament ===
Group A

Croatia	130–35	Albania

Italy	71–89	Croatia

	Team	Pts	Pl	W	L	PF	PA	PD
1.	Croatia	4	2	2	0	219	106	+113
2.	Italy	3	2	1	1	189	124	+65
3.	Albania	2	2	0	2	70	248	−178

Semifinal

Croatia	71–76	Serbia

Bronze medal match

Croatia	77 – 62	Greece

== Bowls ==
Lyonnaise

Athlete	Event	Elimination		Quarterfinal		Semifinal		Final / BM	
Athlete	Event	Score	Rank	Score	Rank	Score	Rank	Score	Rank
Sandro Gulja	Men's precision throw	23	1 Q	13	5	—		did not advance	
Iva Vlahek	Women's precision throw	29	1 Q	3	7	—		did not advance	
Ante Papak	Men's progressive throw	36/48	4 Q	39/47	3 Q	41/49	3 q	29/47	4
Danijela Kolobarić	Women's progressive throw	—		18/36	7	did not advance			

Raffa

Athlete	Event	Group stage						Semifinal	Final / BM	
Athlete	Event	Opposition Score	Opposition Score	Opposition Score	Opposition Score	Opposition Score	Rank	Opposition Score	Opposition Score	Rank
Zdravko Omrčen	Men's singles	Makara (TUR); L 4–12	Benedetti (ITA); L 1–12	Cupac (SRB); W 12–2	—		3	did not advance		
Gordana Dagelić	Women's singles	Ciucci (SMR); L 11–12	Cantalini (ITA); L 1–12	Sindik (MNE); W 12–4	Yuksel (TUR); W 12–5	Orlović (SRB); W 12–0	3 Q	Ciucci (SMR); L 8–12	Yuksel (TUR); L 7–12	4
Petar Kalinić; Zdravko Omrčen	Men's doubles	Petrović / Ranković (MNE); W 12–7	Makara / Seleciler (TUR); L 7–12	—			2 Q	Albani / Albani (SMR); L 7–12	Makara / Seleciler (TUR); L 5–12	4
Gordana Dagelić; Ana Šundov	Women's doubles	Demir / Yuksel (TUR); L 6–12	Cantarini / Corti (ITA); L 1–12	Carinato / Ciucci (SMR); L 3–12	Sindik / Sindik (MNE); W 12–11	Lacarac / Orlović (SRB); W 12–6	4 Q	Demir / Yuksel (TUR); L 5–12	Carinato / Ciucci (SMR); W 12–11	3rd place, bronze medalist(s)

== Boxing ==
Men

Athlete	Event	Round of 16	Quarterfinals	Semifinals	Final	
Athlete	Event	Opposition Result	Opposition Result	Opposition Result	Opposition Result	Rank
Filip Palić	Lightweight	BYE	Weslati (TUN); W 15–7	Marjanović (SRB); W 9–7	Valentino (ITA); L 3–12	2nd place, silver medalist(s)
Borna Katalinić	Welterweight	Marziali (ITA); W 6–3	Khalsi (MAR); L 3–4	did not advance		
Marko Čalić	Heavyweight	Bouloudinat (ALG); W 8–7	Arjaoui (MAR); L WO	did not advance		
Marko Tomasović	Super heavyweight	BYE	Hysa (ALB); W 7–1	Homrani (TUN); W 6–2	Cammarelle (ITA); L WO	2nd place, silver medalist(s)

== Canoeing ==
=== Sprint ===
Men

Athlete	Event	Heats		Semifinals		Final	
Athlete	Event	Time	Rank	Time	Rank	Time	Rank
Stjepan Janić	K-1 500 m	1:39.290	1 FA	Bye		1:45.125	2nd place, silver medalist(s)
Stjepan Janić	K-1 1000 m	3:30.810	3 FA	Bye		3:48.390	3rd place, bronze medalist(s)
Stjepan Janić; Mićo Janić	K-2 500 m	1:41.339	5 Q	1:39.098	2 FA	1:33.302	7

Women

Athlete	Event	Heats		Semifinals		Final	
Athlete	Event	Time	Rank	Time	Rank	Time	Rank
Maja Sudar	K-1 500 m	2:05.495	4 Q	2:07.732	4	did not advance	
Maja Sudar	K-1 1000 m	4:40.870	6 Q	4:23.800	2 FA	4:46.780	9

Legend: FA = Qualify to final (medal); FB = Qualify to final B (non-medal)

== Cycling ==
=== Road ===
Athlete	Event	Time	Rank
Tomislav Dančulović	Men's road race	3:08:18	20
Kristijan Đurasek	Men's road race	3:08:19	30
Luka Grubić	Men's road race	3:08:17	17

== Equestrian ==
=== Jumping ===
Athlete	Horse	Event	Qualification						Final					Total	
Athlete	Horse	Event	Round 1		Round 2			Round A			Round B			Total	
Athlete	Horse	Event	Penalties	Rank	Penalties	Total	Rank	Penalties	Total	Rank	Penalties	Total	Rank	Penalties	Rank
Vernalis Dokuzović	Odessa	Individual	8	=24 Q	28	36	=41 Q	20	56	39	did not advance			56	39
Denis Gugić	Up To Date	Individual	16	=42 Q	20	36	=41 Q	9	45	36 Q	9	54	32	54	32
Janika Krasovec	Cebano	Individual	4	=18 Q	16	20	=31 Q	8	28	26 Q	8	36	24	36	24
Filip Rožmarić	Cezar	Individual	9	34 Q	8	17	30 Q	0	17	20 Q	16	33	23	33	23
Vernalis Dokuzović; Denis Gugić; Janika Krasovec; Filip Rožmarić	See above	Team	—						21	9 Q	44	65	10	65	10

== Fencing ==
Women

Athlete	Event	Group stage						Quarterfinal	Semifinal	Final / BM	
Athlete	Event	Opposition Score	Opposition Score	Opposition Score	Opposition Score	Opposition Score	Rank	Opposition Score	Opposition Score	Opposition Score	Rank
Tončica Topić	Épée	Moellhausen (ITA); L 3–5	Kostaki (GRE); L 1–5	Colignon (FRA); L 1–5	Deger (TUR); W 5–1	Besbes (TUN); L 2–5	5	did not advance			

== Gymnastics ==
=== Artistic ===
Men
Team

Athlete	Event	Final							
Athlete	Event	Apparatus						Total	Rank
Athlete	Event	F	PH	R	V	PB	HB	Total	Rank
Marko Brez	Team	13.650	12.950	13.550	14.100	13.650	14.350 Q	82.250	12 Q
Nikola Dudek	Team	13.000	13.100	13.050	14.650	11.750	13.700	79.250	14 Q
Tomislav Marković	Team	14.750 Q	—	12.950	14.350	12.850	—	54.900	36
Robert Seligman	Team	—	14.600 Q	—				14.600	53
Filip Ude	Team	14.800 Q	—		15.600	12.900	14.250	57.550	34
Total	Team	43.200	40.650	39.550	44.600	39.400	42.300	249.700	5

Individual finals

Athlete	Event	Apparatus						Total	Rank
Athlete	Event	F	PH	R	V	PB	HB	Total	Rank
Tomislav Marković	Floor	14.550	—					14.550	6
Filip Ude	Floor	15.200	—					15.200	2nd place, silver medalist(s)
Robert Seligman	Pommel horse	—	14.400	—				14.400	4
Marko Brez	Horizontal bar	—					12.600	12.600	8
Marko Brez	All-around	13.550	13.400	13.300	14.500	13.500	13.900	82.150	9
Nikola Dudek	All-around	13.400	12.350	13.000	14.750	13.900	13.350	80.750	10

== Handball ==
=== Women's tournament ===
Group A

26 June	Croatia	28–24	Greece

27 June	Italy	26–38	Croatia

29 June	Croatia	28–31	Turkey

30 June	Spain	34–17	Croatia

Team	Pld	W	D	L	GF	GA	GD	Points
Turkey	4	4	0	0	128	92	36	8
Spain	4	3	0	1	134	77	57	6
Croatia	4	2	0	2	111	115	−4	4
Italy	4	1	0	3	102	147	−45	2
Greece	4	0	0	4	90	134	−44	0

== Judo ==
Athlete	Event	Round of 16	Quarterfinals	Semifinals	Repechage	Final / BM	
Athlete	Event	Opposition Result	Opposition Result	Opposition Result	Opposition Result	Opposition Result	Rank
Dragan Crnov	Men's −73 kg	Uematsu Trevino (ESP); L 0001–0011	did not advance				
Tomislav Marijanović	Men's −81 kg	Jeannin (FRA); L 100–000	did not advance				
Kristina Marijanović	Women's −70 kg	Bayram (TUR); W 1000–0011	Iglesias Armino (ESP); L 0102–0210	did not advance	Vyzaniari (GRE); W 1020–0000	Barbieri (ITA); L 0001–0200	5

== Karate ==
Athlete	Event	Round of 32	Round of 16	Quarterfinals	Semifinals	Repechage 1	Repechage 2	Final / BM	
Athlete	Event	Opposition Result	Opposition Result	Opposition Result	Opposition Result	Opposition Result	Opposition Result	Opposition Result	Rank
Danil Dondjoni	Men's −60 kg	—	Tabben (TUN); W 2–0	Bouamria (ALG); W 2–0	Giuliani (ITA); L 0–2	—	Bye	Syllas (GRE); W 2–0	3rd place, bronze medalist(s)
Rene Pernus	Men's −75 kg	Matijevič (SLO); W HAN	Busa' (ITA); L 0–0	did not advance		Bye	Tzanos (GRE); L 0–6	did not advance	
Neven Martić	Men's −84 kg	—	Abuzeid (LBA); W 4–3	Erkan (TUR); W HAS 00:55	Loria (ITA); L KO 03:00	—	Bye	Taumotekava (FRA); L KO 04:00	5
Jelena Kovačević	Women's −55 kg	—	Sawaya (LIB); W 1–0	El Djou (ALG); W HAN	Samy (FRA); W HAN	Bye		Ben Othman (TUN); L 0–2	2nd place, silver medalist(s)
Ivana Goricaj	Women's −61 kg	—	Hasnaoui (TUN); W HAN	Vicente (ESP); L HAN	did not advance				
Petra Volf	Women's −68 kg	—	Guezzouli (ALG); W 2–0	Guler (TUR); W 1–0	Colomar Costa (ESP); W 1–0	Bye		Panetsidou (GRE); W 3–0	1st place, gold medalist(s)
Ana-Marija Čelan	Women's +68 kg	—	Bye	Aras (TUR); L 0–1	did not advance				

== Rowing ==
Men

Athlete	Event	Heats		Repechage		Final	
Athlete	Event	Time	Rank	Time	Rank	Time	Rank
Marko Kušurin	Lightweight Single sculls	8:32.16	4 R	7:37.02	4 FA	7:24.55	6
Mario Vekić	Single sculls	7:01.14	1 FA	—		7:05.81	2nd place, silver medalist(s)

Women

Athlete	Event	Heats		Final	
Athlete	Event	Time	Rank	Time	Rank
Marcela Milošević	Single sculls	8:19.56	4 FA	8:21.63	4
Mirna Rajle Brođanac	Lightweight Single sculls	8:06.59	3 FA	7:53.84	3rd place, bronze medalist(s)

== Sailing ==
Men

Athlete	Event	Race											Net points	Final rank
Athlete	Event	1	2	3	4	5	6	7	8	9	10	M*	Net points	Final rank
Daniel Mihelić	Laser	12	10	1	8	~~20 DNF~~	3	1	1	CAN			36	5
Tonči Stipanović	Laser	3	~~29~~	3	3	1	7	4	5	CAN			26	2nd place, silver medalist(s)
Šime Fantela; Igor Marenić	470	~~8~~	2	5	3	3	2	5	3	4	CAN		27	2nd place, silver medalist(s)

Women

Athlete	Event	Race											Net points	Final rank
Athlete	Event	1	2	3	4	5	6	7	8	9	10	M*	Net points	Final rank
Tina Mihelić	Laser Radial	4	6	3	4	3	2	~~15 DNF~~	CAN				22	2nd place, silver medalist(s)
Enia Ninčević; Romana Župan	470	~~9~~	9	4	5	3	7	6	3	CAN			37	7

M = Medal race; EL = Eliminated – did not advance into the medal race;

== Shooting ==
Men

Athlete	Event	Qualification		Final	
Athlete	Event	Points	Rank	Points	Rank
Anton Glasnović	Trap	101	26	did not advance	
Josip Glasnović	Trap	119	5 Q	141 S/O 3	4
Petar Gorša	10 m air rifle	593	5 Q	695.2	6
Petar Gorša	50 m rifle prone	588	8 Q	690.1	8
Petar Gorša	50 m rifle 3 positions	1146	10	did not advance	

Women

Athlete	Event	Qualification		Final	
Athlete	Event	Points	Rank	Points	Rank
Marija Marović	10 m air pistol	381	4 Q	476.6	6
Marija Marović	25 m pistol	572	7 Q	756.2	8
Snježana Pejčić	10 m air rifle	393	6 Q	494.4	7
Snježana Pejčić	50 m rifle 3 positions	576	2 Q	675.3	1st place, gold medalist(s)
Vlatka Pervan	25 m pistol	571	10	did not advance	
Kristina Vrbek	10 m air pistol	372	16	did not advance	

== Swimming ==
Men

Athlete	Event	Heat		Final	
Athlete	Event	Time	Rank	Time	Rank
Ivan Perhat	50 m freestyle	23.81	7	did not advance	
Alexei Puninski	50 m freestyle	23.06	6	did not advance	
Alexei Puninski	100 m freestyle	DNS		did not advance	
Mario Todorović	100 m freestyle	DNS		did not advance	
Mario Delač	200 m freestyle	1:53.39	6	did not advance	
Dominik Straga	200 m freestyle	DNS		did not advance	
Ante Cvitković	50 m backstroke	26.24	3 Q	26.27	7
Ivan Tolić	50 m backstroke	26.85	3 Q	27.29	8
Ante Cvitković	100 m backstroke	56.47	2 Q	DSQ	
Ivan Tolić	100 m backstroke	58.86	4	did not advance	
Ante Cvitković	200 m backstroke	DSQ		did not advance	
Ivan Bilić	50 m breaststroke	29.73	6	did not advance	
Vanja Rogulj	50 m breaststroke	28.21	3 Q	28.29	7
Nikola Delić	100 m breastroke	DSQ		did not advance	
Vanja Rogulj	100 m breastroke	1:03.47	4	did not advance	
Vanja Rogulj	200 m breastroke	2:29.67	6	did not advance	
Luka Škugor	200 m breastroke	2:16.97	6	did not advance	
Alexei Puninski	50 m butterfly	24.27	3 Q	23.93	6
Mario Todorović	50 m butterfly	23.67	1 Q	23.61	1st place, gold medalist(s)
Dominik Straga	100 m butterfly	52.28	1 Q	DNS	
Mario Todorović	100 m butterfly	53.39	4 Q	52.41	4
Nikša Roki	200 m butterfly	2:20.33	5	did not advance	
Saša Imprić	200 m individual medley	2:05.33	5	did not advance	
Nikša Roki	200 m individual medley	2:04.13	4 Q	2:05.54	7
Nikša Roki	400 m individual medley	4:37.59	5	did not advance	
Mario Delač; Ivan Perhat; Alexei Puninski; Dominik Straga	4 × 100 m freestyle relay	—		3:19.92	4
Mario Delač; Saša Imprić; Nikša Roki; Dominik Straga	4 × 200 m freestyle relay	8:03.52	6 Q	7:29.96	6
Ante Cvitković; Vanja Rogulj; Luka Škugor*; Dominik Straga; Mario Todorović; Ivan Tolić*	4 × 100 m medley relay	3:47.80	2 Q	3:41.78	5
Kristjan Mamić	100 m freestyle S10	1:04.78	3 Q	1:05.17	8
Kristijan Vincetić	100 m freestyle S10	1:00.29	2 Q	59.93	6

Women

Athlete	Event	Heat		Final	
Athlete	Event	Time	Rank	Time	Rank
Monika Babok	50 m freestyle	26.35	4	did not advance	
Monika Babok	100 m freestyle	57.86	6	did not advance	
Lidja Franić	50 m backstroke	29.49	3 Q	29.85	8
Sanja Jovanović	50 m backstroke	29.09	2 Q	28.65	3rd place, bronze medalist(s)
Lidja Franić	100 m backstroke	1:05.50	4	did not advance	
Sanja Jovanović	100 m backstroke	1:03.81	3 Q	1:02.72	5
Monika Babok	50 m butterfly	27.43	3 Q	27.50	8
Sanja Milojević	100 m freestyle S10	—		1:11.81	6

* – Indicates athlete swam in the preliminaries but not in the final race.

== Table tennis ==
Men

Athlete	Event	Round Robin 1			Round Robin 2				Quarterfinal	Semifinal	Final / BM	
Athlete	Event	Opposition Score	Opposition Score	Rank	Opposition Score	Opposition Score	Opposition Score	Rank	Opposition Score	Opposition Score	Opposition Score	Rank
Andrej Gaćina	Singles	Vannucci (SMR); W 4–0	Miličević (BIH); W 4–0	1 Q	Karakašević (SRB); W 4–1	Bobocica (ITA); W 4–3	Machado Sobrados (ESP); W 4–2	1 Q	Zeng (TUR); W 4–2	Carneros Beamud (ESP); W 4–1	Gkionis (GRE); L 1–4	2nd place, silver medalist(s)
Roko Tošić	Singles	El Boubou (LIB); W 4–1	Zeng (TUR); W 4–1	1 Q	Lebesson (FRA); L 0–4	Gkionis (GRE); L 2–4	Miličević (BIH); W 4–1	3	did not advance			
Andrej Gaćina; Roko Tošić	Team	Stefanelli / Vannucci (SMR); W 3–0	Belkadi / Khrouf / Zaidi (ALG); W 3–0	1 Q	—				Vang / Zeng (TUR); W 3–1	Karakašević / Grujić (SRB); W 3–0	Lebesson / Mattenet (FRA); L 0–3	2nd place, silver medalist(s)

Women

Athlete	Event	Round Robin 1				Round Robin 2				Quarterfinal	Semifinal	Final / BM	
Athlete	Event	Opposition Score	Opposition Score	Opposition Score	Rank	Opposition Score	Opposition Score	Opposition Score	Rank	Opposition Score	Opposition Score	Opposition Score	Rank
Andrea Bakula	Singles	Stefanova (ITA); L 0–4	Medjoub (ALG); W 4–0	—	2 Q	Hu (TUR); L 2–4	Isaku (ALB); W 4–0	Bermudez (ESP); L 0–4	3	did not advance			
Cornelia Vaida	Singles	Isaku (ALB); W 4–0	Erdelji (SRB); L 1–4	—	2 Q	Grundisch (FRA); W 4–2	Stefanova (ITA); W 4–0	Ntoulaki (GRE); L 3–4	2 Q	He (TUR); W 4–1	Li (FRA); L 0–4	Ntoulaki (GRE); L 1–4	4
Andrea Bakula; Cornelia Vaida	Team	Bouclares / Bougadoum / Medjoub (ALG); W 3–0	Erdelji / Molnar (SRB); W 3–1	Isa. / Mus. / Skuf. (ALB); W 3–0	1 Q	—				He / Hu (TUR); L 0–3	did not advance		

== Volleyball ==
=== Beach ===
Athlete	Event	Preliminary round	Standing	Quarterfinals	Semifinals	Final / BM	
Athlete	Event	Opposition Score	Standing	Opposition Score	Opposition Score	Opposition Score	Rank
Pero Križanović; Krešimir Perić	Men's	Pool D Ingrosso – Ingrosso (ITA); L 1 – 2 (21–17, 19–21, 8–15); Anan – Bushaala (LBA); W 2 – 1 (19–21, 21–13, 19–17); Folguera Estruga – Salvador Campillo (AND); L 0 – 2 (20–22, 19–21)	2 Q	Polyxroniadis – Vlachostathis (GRE); W 2 – 0 (21–11, 24–22)	Ariza – De Amo Fernandez (ESP); L 1 – 2 (21–18, 15–21, 11–15)	Ingrosso – Ingrosso (ITA); L 0 – 2 (15–21, 17–21)	4
Dijana Crnić; Maja Majić	Women's	Pool A Faure – Giordano (FRA); L 0 – 2 (7–21, 11–21); Ferretti – Giombini (ITA); L 0 – 2 (15–21, 6–21); Gundogdu – Sahin (TUR); L 0 – 2 (12–21, 10–21); Brusilda – Qose (ALB); L 1 – 2 (22–20, 18–21, 12–15)	5	did not advance			

=== Indoor ===
==== Women's tournament ====
Group B

28 June 2009; 12:30	Croatia	3–1	France	Vasto Sport Hall, Pescara; Attendance: 100; Referees: Brian McDougall (GBR), Daniele Rapisarda (ITA)
28 June 2009; 12:30	(25–16, 24–26, 25–16, 25–12)			Vasto Sport Hall, Pescara; Attendance: 100; Referees: Brian McDougall (GBR), Daniele Rapisarda (ITA)

29 June 2009; 12:30	Algeria	0–3	Croatia	Vasto Sport Hall, Pescara; Attendance: 60; Referees: Jamel Hidri (TUN), Chiat Firincioglu (TUR)
29 June 2009; 12:30	(16–25, 16–25, 15–25)			Vasto Sport Hall, Pescara; Attendance: 60; Referees: Jamel Hidri (TUN), Chiat Firincioglu (TUR)

30 June 2009; 12:30	Croatia	0–3	Italy	Vasto Sport Hall, Pescara; Attendance: 2,100; Referees: Michalis Themelis (GRE), Jurij Stengar (SLO)
30 June 2009; 12:30	(21–25, 19–25, 18–25)			Vasto Sport Hall, Pescara; Attendance: 2,100; Referees: Michalis Themelis (GRE), Jurij Stengar (SLO)
