= Karaoğlanoğlu (disambiguation) =

Karaoğlanoğlu is Turkish for Agios Georgios, a village in the Kyrenia district of Northern Cyprus.

Karaoğlanoğlu may also refer to:

- Orçun Karaoğlanoğlu (born 1987), Turkish kayaker
- Colonel Karaoglanoglu, Turkish soldier who died at the Battle of Pentemili beachhead, 1974
