= Morocco at the 2005 Mediterranean Games =

- IOC code: MAR
- NOC: Moroccan Olympic Committee

in Almería
- Medals Ranked 12th: Gold 3 Silver 6 Bronze 3 Total 12

Mediterranean Games appearances (overview)
- 1959; 1963; 1967; 1971; 1975; 1979; 1983; 1987; 1991; 1993; 1997; 2001; 2005; 2009; 2013; 2018; 2022

Morocco (MAR) competed at the 2005 Mediterranean Games in Almería, Spain. The nation had a total number of 142 participants (110 men and 32 women).

== Medals ==
=== Gold ===
Athletics

- Men's 10.000 metres: Mohammed Amyn
- Men's 3000m Steeplechase: Brahim Boulami
- Women's Half Marathon: Zhor El Kamch

=== Silver ===
Athletics

- Men's 1.500 metres: Adil Kaouch
- Men's 5.000 metres: Hicham Bellani
- Men's Triple Jump: Tarik Bouguetaïb
- Men's Half Marathon: Abdelkebir Lamachi
- Women's 5.000 metres: Asmae Leghzaoui
- Women's 10.000 metres: Asmae Leghzaoui

=== Bronze ===
Athletics

- Men's 800 metres: Amine Laalou

Boxing

- Men's Featherweight (– 57 kg): Aboubakr Seddik Lbida

Judo

- Men's Half-Middleweight (– 81 kg): Safouane Attaf

== See also ==
- Morocco at the 2004 Summer Olympics
- Morocco at the 2008 Summer Olympics
