= Equestrian at the 2009 Mediterranean Games =

The Equestrian Competition at the 2009 Mediterranean Games was held in Pescara, Italy.

== Individual Jumping ==
Rank	Final
1st place, gold medalist(s)	Simon Delestre (FRA)
2nd place, silver medalist(s)	Alexandra Francart (FRA)
3rd place, bronze medalist(s)	Julien Gonin (FRA)

== Team Jumping ==
Rank	Final
1st place, gold medalist(s)	France
2nd place, silver medalist(s)	Spain
3rd place, bronze medalist(s)	Greece

== Medal table ==
Place	Nation	1st place, gold medalist(s)	2nd place, silver medalist(s)	3rd place, bronze medalist(s)	Total
1	France	2	1	1	4
2	Spain	0	1	0	1
3	Greece	0	0	1	1
Total		2	2	2	6
