= Fencing at the 2009 Mediterranean Games =

The Fencing Competition at the 2009 Mediterranean Games was held in Pescara, Italy.

== Medallists ==
=== Men's Competition ===
==== Individual Epée ====
Rank	Final
1st place, gold medalist(s)	Gauthier Grumier (FRA)
2nd place, silver medalist(s)	Matteo Tagliariol (ITA)
3rd place, bronze medalist(s)	Francesco Martinelli (ITA)

=== Women's competition ===
==== Individual Epée ====
Rank	Final
1st place, gold medalist(s)	Nathalie Moellhausen (ITA)
2nd place, silver medalist(s)	Sarra Besbes (TUN)
3rd place, bronze medalist(s)	Jeanne Colignon (FRA)

==== Individual Foil ====
Rank	Final
1st place, gold medalist(s)	Valentina Vezzali (ITA)
2nd place, silver medalist(s)	Margherita Granbassi (ITA)
3rd place, bronze medalist(s)	Ines Boubakri (TUN)

==== Individual Sabre ====
Rank	Final
1st place, gold medalist(s)	Carole Vergne (FRA)
2nd place, silver medalist(s)	Léonore Perrus (FRA)
3rd place, bronze medalist(s)	Ilaria Bianco (ITA)

== Medal table ==
Place	Nation	1st place, gold medalist(s)	2nd place, silver medalist(s)	3rd place, bronze medalist(s)	Total
1	Italy	2	2	2	6
2	France	2	1	1	4
3	Tunisia	0	1	1	2
Total		4	4	4	12
