= Serbia at the 2009 Mediterranean Games =

- IOC code: SRB
- NOC: Olympic Committee of Serbia

in Pescara
- Competitors: 153 in 17 sports
- Flag bearer: Jasna Šekarić
- Medals Ranked 8th: Gold 9 Silver 13 Bronze 13 Total 35

Mediterranean Games appearances (overview)
- 2009; 2013; 2018; 2022; 2026

Other related appearances
- Yugoslavia (1951–1991); Serbia and Montenegro (1997–2005); Kosovo (2018–pres.)

Serbia competed at the 2009 Mediterranean Games held in Pescara, Italy. 153 athletes in 17 sports represented Serbia. Serbia won total of 35 medals, 9 gold, 13 silver and 13 bronze medals.

== Medals by sport ==
| Sport | Gold | Silver | Bronze | Total |
|---|---|---|---|---|
| Shooting | 2 | 5 | 2 | 9 |
| Swimming | 2 | 2 | 1 | 5 |
| Wrestling | 2 | 1 | 2 | 5 |
| Handball | 1 | 0 | 0 | 1 |
| Judo | 1 | 0 | 0 | 1 |
| Water polo | 1 | 0 | 0 | 1 |
| Canoeing | 0 | 2 | 1 | 3 |
| Athletics | 0 | 1 | 2 | 3 |
| Boxing | 0 | 1 | 1 | 2 |
| Basketball | 0 | 1 | 0 | 1 |
| Karate | 0 | 0 | 2 | 2 |
| Rowing | 0 | 0 | 1 | 1 |
| Table tennis | 0 | 0 | 1 | 1 |
| Totals (13 entries) | 9 | 13 | 13 | 35 |

== Medalists ==
| Medal | Name | Sport | Event |
|---|---|---|---|
| Gold | Serbia men's national handball team: Petar Đorđić; Jožef Holpert; Veljko Inđić; Nenad Malenčić; Dragan Marjanac; Dobrivoje Marković; Savo Mešter; Petar Nenadić; Dragan Počuča; Rajko Prodanović; Momir Rnić; Žarko Šešum; Aleksandar Stanojević; Tomislav Stojković; Dragan Tubić; Uroš Vilovski | Handball | Men's tournament |
| Gold | Miloš Mijalković | Judo | 66kg |
| Gold | Zorana Arunović | Shooting | 10m Air Pistol |
| Gold | Andrea Arsović | Shooting | 10m Air Rifle |
| Gold | Miroslava Najdanovski | Swimming | 100 m freestyle |
| Gold | Ivan Lendjer | Swimming | 100 m Butterfly |
| Gold | Serbia men's national water polo team: Milan Aleksić; Marko Avramović; Filip Filipović; Slavko Gak; Živko Gocić; Stefan Mitrović; Slobodan Nikić; Gojko Pijetlović; Duško Pijetlović; Andrija Prlainović; Nikola Rađen; Slobodan Soro; Vanja Udovičić | Water polo | Men's tournament |
| Gold | Kristijan Fris | Wrestling | Greco-Roman 55 kg |
| Gold | Davor Štefanek | Wrestling | Greco-Roman 60 kg |
| Silver | Olivera Jevtić | Athletics | 10,000 metres |
| Silver | Serbia women's national basketball team: Tijana Ajduković; Nina Bogićević; Ana Dabovic; Latinka Dušanić; Jelena Jovanović; Nevena Jovanović; Jefimija Karakašević; Milica Paligorić; Sonja Petrović; Jovana Popović; Ana Radović; Tatjana Živanović | Basketball | Women's tournament |
| Silver | Branimir Stanković | Boxing | 57kg |
| Silver | Marko Tomićević | Canoeing | K1 1000m |
| Silver | Antonija Nađ | Canoeing | K1 1000m |
| Silver | Andrija Zlatić | Shooting | 10m Air Pistol |
| Silver | Jasna Šekarić | Shooting | 25m Pistol |
| Silver | Damir Mikec | Shooting | 50m Pistol |
| Silver | Nemanja Mirosavljev | Shooting | 50 metre rifle prone |
| Silver | Nemanja Mirosavljev | Shooting | 50 metre rifle three positions |
| Silver | Ivan Lendjer | Swimming | 50m Butterfly |
| Silver | Čaba Silađi | Swimming | 100 m Breaststroke |
| Silver | Aleksandar Maksimović | Wrestling | Men's Greco-Roman 66 kg |
| Bronze | Dragana Tomašević | Athletics | Discus throw |
| Bronze | Dragutin Topić | Athletics | High jump |
| Bronze | Ljubomir Marjanović | Boxing | 60kg |
| Bronze | Dejan Pajić; Dusko Stanojević | Canoeing | K2 1000m |
| Bronze | Biljana Stojović | Karate | -50kg |
| Bronze | Valentin Popa | Karate | -67kg |
| Bronze | Nikola Stojić; Goran Jagar | Rowing | Coxless pair |
| Bronze | Jasna Šekarić | Shooting | 10m Air Pistol |
| Bronze | Andrija Zlatić | Shooting | 50m Pistol |
| Bronze | Čaba Silađi | Swimming | 50 m Breaststroke |
| Bronze | Aleksandar Karakašević; Slobodan Grujić | Table tennis | Men's team |
| Bronze | Radomir Petković | Wrestling | Greco-Roman 120 kg |
| Bronze | Radomir Petković | Wrestling | Men's Freestyle 120 kg |
