= Montenegro at the 2009 Mediterranean Games =

- IOC code: MNE
- NOC: Montenegrin Olympic Committee

in Pescara
- Medals Ranked 16th: Gold 2 Silver 2 Bronze 3 Total 7

Mediterranean Games appearances (overview)
- 2009; 2013; 2018; 2022

Other related appearances
- Yugoslavia (1951–1991); Serbia and Montenegro (1997–2005)

Montenegro competed at the 2009 Mediterranean Games held in Pescara, Italy. It won 2 gold, 2 silver and 3 bronze medals.

== Medalists ==
Medal	Name	Sport	Event
Gold	Miroslav Petković	Bocce	
Gold	Boško Drašković	Boxing	81 kg
Silver	Almir Cecunjanin	Karate	84 kg
Silver	Daniel Danilović, Goran Tošić	Tennis	Men's doubles
Bronze	Vladimir Radosaulevic	Wrestling	Men's Greco-Roman 96 kg
Bronze	Alen Beganović	Boxing	+91 kg
Bronze	Handball team: Radmila Miljanić Jovanka Radičević Djurdjica Djurović Marija Jovanović Ana Radović Anđela Dragutinović Sonja Barjaktarović Mirjana Milenković Jelena Marković Ivana Dragaš Suzana Lazović Majda Mehmedović Milena Raičević Ivana Božović	Handball	Women's tournament
