= Morocco at the 2009 Mediterranean Games =

- IOC code: MAR
- NOC: Moroccan Olympic Committee

in Pescara
- Medals Ranked 10th: Gold 6 Silver 9 Bronze 6 Total 21

Mediterranean Games appearances (overview)
- 1959; 1963; 1967; 1971; 1975; 1979; 1983; 1987; 1991; 1993; 1997; 2001; 2005; 2009; 2013; 2018; 2022

Morocco competed at the 2009 Mediterranean Games held in Pescara, Italy.

== Medal Count ==
Medal	Name	Sport	Event
Gold	Laalou Amine	Athletics	Men's 800m
Gold	Chatbi Jamel	Athletics	Men's 3000m Steeplechase
Gold	Selmouni Anis	Athletics	Men's 5000m
Gold	Ouhaddou Hanane	Athletics	Women's 5000m
Gold	Baday Ahmed	Athletics	Men's 1/2 Marathon
Gold	Bellani Hicham	Athletics	Men's 10000m
Silver	Hachlaf Halima	Athletics	Women's 800m
Silver	Moustaoui Mohamed	Athletics	Men's 1500m
Silver	Lakhouad Btissam	Athletics	Women's 1500m
Silver	Boujattaoui Chakir	Athletics	Men's 3000m Steeplechase
Silver	Berrabah Yahya	Athletics	Men's Long Jump
Silver	Amyn Mohammed	Athletics	Men's 10000m
Silver	Moussaid Driss	Boxing	Super Light 64 kg
Silver	Khalsi Mehdi	Boxing	Welter 69 kg
Silver	El Assri Mohamed	Judo	Men -90 kg Middle
Bronze	Iguider Abdalaati	Athletics	Men's 1500m
Bronze	Mesbahi Hicham	Boxing	Bantam 54 kg
Bronze	Arjaoui Mohammed	Boxing	Heavy 91 kg
Bronze	Attaf Safouane	Judo	Men -81 kg Half-Middle
Bronze	El Allami/Lalami	Tennis	Women's Doubles

== Number of Entries by Sport ==
Discipline	Men	Women	Total
Athletics	24	13	37
Basketball	12	0	12
Beach Volleyball	2	0	2
Boxing	9	0	9
Cycling Road	8	0	8
Equestrian	5	0	5
Fencing	2	0	2
Artistic Gymnastics	2	0	2
Golf	3	3	6
Judo	6	5	11
Bowls	2	0	2
Shooting	4	2	6
Swimming	5	4	9
Tennis	2	2	4
Volleyball	12	0	12
Weightlifting	0	2	2
Totals	98	31	129

== See also ==
- Mediterranean Games
- 2009 Mediterranean Games medal table
- European Olympic Committees
