= Gökhan Kılıç =

Turkish weightlifter (born 1988)

Personal information
- Nationality: Turkish
- Born: 6 January 1988 (age 38) Sakarya, Turkey
- Height: 1.62 m (5 ft 4 in)
- Weight: 56 kg (123 lb)

Sport
- Country: Turkey
- Sport: Weightlifting
- Weight class: 56 kg
Medal record
Men's weightlifting
Representing Turkey
European Championships
Silver medal – second place	2011 Kazan	56 kg
Bronze medal – third place	2012 Antalya	56 kg
Mediterranean Games
Bronze medal – third place	2009 Pescara	56 kg S

Gökhan Kılıç (born 6 January 1988) is a Turkish weightlifter competing in the –56 kg division.

== Career ==
Born in Sakarya Province, Turkey, Kılıç began weightlifting at a young age and soon joined the national team setup. He represented Turkey in the 56 kg category during the late 2000s and 2010s.

He first gained international attention at the 2009 Mediterranean Games held in Pescara, Italy, where he earned a bronze medal in total with lifts of 111 kg in snatch and 135 kg in clean & jerk.

At the 2011 European Weightlifting Championships in Kazan, Russia, Kılıç won the gold medal in the snatch category and the silver in total, lifting 118 kg in snatch and 138 kg in clean & jerk for a combined total of 256 kg.

The following year, at the 2012 European Weightlifting Championships held in Antalya, Turkey, he won the bronze medal after lifting 121 kg in snatch and 136 kg in clean & jerk (257 kg total).

Kılıç represented Turkey in various international tournaments throughout his career, establishing himself as one of the country’s consistent performers in the lighter weight categories during the early 2010s.

== Major results ==
Year	Competition	Venue	Weight	Result (kg)		Total	Rank
Year	Competition	Venue	Weight	S	C	Total	Rank
2009	Mediterranean Games	Pescara, Italy	56 kg	111	135	246	3rd place, bronze medalist(s)
2011	European Weightlifting Championships	Kazan, Russia	56 kg	118	138	256	2nd place, silver medalist(s)
2012	European Weightlifting Championships	Antalya, Turkey	56 kg	121	136	257	3rd place, bronze medalist(s)
