= Turkey at the 2009 Mediterranean Games =

- IOC code: TUR
- NOC: Turkish Olympic Committee

in Pescara
- Competitors: 332
- Medals Ranked 5th: Gold 18 Silver 20 Bronze 25 Total 63

Mediterranean Games appearances (overview)
- 1951; 1955; 1959; 1963; 1967; 1971; 1975; 1979; 1983; 1987; 1991; 1993; 1997; 2001; 2005; 2009; 2013; 2018; 2022

Turkey participated in the 2009 Mediterranean Games held in Pescara, Italy from 25 June to 5 July 2009.

== Competitors ==
Sport	Men	Women	Total
Athletics	19	13	32
Basketball	12	12	24
Bocce	6	6	12
Boxing	11	0	11
Canoeing	4	1	5
Cycling	5	1	6
Equestrian	5	0	5
Fencing	2	6	8
Football	18	0	18
Golf	3	3	6
Gymnastics, Artistic	5	1	6
Gymnastics, Rhythmic	0	3	3
Handball	16	16	32
Judo	7	7	14
Karate	5	5	10
Rowing	7	0	7
Sailing	4	0	4
Shooting	13	4	17
Swimming	11	11	22
Table tennis	2	2	4
Tennis	3	2	5
Volleyball, Beach	4	4	8
Volleyball	12	12	24
Water polo	13	0	13
Water ski	4	4	8
Weightlifting	7	4	11
Wrestling	13	4	17
Total	211	121	332

== Medal summary ==
=== Medal table ===
Sport	Gold	Silver	Bronze	Total
Wrestling	7	2	4	13
Weightlifting	4	6	3	13
Athletics	3	3	4	10
Boxing	2	1	3	6
Karate	1	0	3	4
Table tennis	1	0	0	1
Bocce	0	2	3	5
Tennis	0	2	0	2
Gymnastics, Artistic	0	1	0	1
Handball	0	1	0	1
Shooting	0	1	0	1
Volleyball	0	1	0	1
Judo	0	0	3	3
Basketball	0	0	1	1
Golf	0	0	1	1
Total	18	19	26	63

=== Medalists ===
Medal	Name	Sport	Event
Gold	Elvan Abeylegesse	Athletics	Women's 10000m
Gold	Fatih Avan	Athletics	Men's Javelin Throw
Gold	Nevin Yanıt	Athletics	Women's 100m Hurdles
Gold	Kerem Gürgen	Boxing	Feather 57 kg
Gold	Önder Şipal	Boxing	Welter 69 kg
Gold	Gülderen Çelik	Karate	Women's Under 50 kg
Gold	Melek Hu	Table Tennis	Women's Singles
Gold	Erol Bilgin	Weightlifting	Men's 62 kg - Clean and Jerk
Gold	Erol Bilgin	Weightlifting	Men's 62 kg - Snatch
Gold	İzzet İnce	Weightlifting	Men's 85 kg - Snatch
Gold	Nurcan Taylan (DQ)	Weightlifting	Women's 53 kg - Snatch
Gold	Nurcan Taylan (DQ)	Weightlifting	Women's 53 kg - Clean and Jerk
Gold	Aylin Daşdelen	Weightlifting	Women's 58 kg - Clean&Jerk
Gold	Şeref Tüfenk	Wrestling	Men's Grecoroman 74 kg
Gold	Serkan Özden	Wrestling	Men's Grecoroman 96 kg
Gold	Rıza Kayaalp	Wrestling	Men's Grecoroman 120 kg
Gold	Sezar Akgül	Wrestling	Men's Freestyle 55 kg
Gold	Muhammet İlkkan	Wrestling	Men's Freestyle 66 kg
Gold	Ali İmamoğlu	Wrestling	Men's Freestyle 84 kg
Gold	Fatih Çakıroğlu	Wrestling	Men's Freestyle 120 kg
Silver	Göksu Üçtaş	Artistic gymnastics	Women's Vault
Silver	Ercüment Olgundeniz	Athletics	Men's Discus Throw
Silver	Karin Mey Melis	Athletics	Women's Long Jump
Silver	Burcu Ayhan	Athletics	Women's High Jump
Silver	İlke Kumartaşlıoğlu	Bowls	Women's Precision throw
Silver	Turkey	Bowls	Raffa-Women's Doubles
Silver	Adem Kılıççı	Boxing	Middle 75 kg
Silver	Turkey	Handball	Women
Silver	Ayşe Kil Erten	Shooting	Women's 10m Air Pistol
Silver	Marsel İlhan	Tennis	Men's Singles
Silver	Turkey	Tennis	Women's Doubles
Silver	Turkey	Volleyball	Women]
Silver	Bünyamin Sudaş	Weightlifting	Men's 105 kg Snatch
Silver	Bünyamin Sudaş	Weightlifting	Men's 105 kg Clean&Jerk
Silver	Sedat Artuç	Weightlifting	Men's 56 kg Snatch
Silver	Sibel Şimşek	Weightlifting	Women's 63 kg Snatch
Silver	Sibel Şimşek	Weightlifting	Women's 63 kg Clean&Jerk
Silver	Dilek Atakol	Wrestling	Women's Freestyle 51 kg
Silver	Mustafa Kartal	Wrestling	Men's Freestyle 60 kg
Bronze	Halil Akkaş	Athletics	Men's 3000m Steeplechase
Bronze	Kemal Koyuncu	Athletics	Men's 5000m
Bronze	Selim Bayrak	Athletics	Men's 10000m
Bronze	Turkey	Athletics	Men's 4 × 100 m Relay
Bronze	Turkey	Basketball	Men
Bronze	Caner Makara	Bowls	Raffa-Men's Singles
Bronze	Rukiye Yüksel	Bowls	Raffa-Women's Singles
Bronze	Turkey	Bowls	Raffa-Men's Doubles
Bronze	Ferhat Pehlivan	Boxing	Light Fly 48 kg
Bronze	Yakup Kılıç	Boxing	Light 60 kg
Bronze	Önder Özgül	Boxing	Light Heavy 81 kg
Bronze	Turkey	Golf	Men's Team
Bronze	Derya Cıbır	Judo	Women -48 kg Extra-Light
Bronze	Sezer Huysuz	Judo	Men -73 kg Light
Bronze	Gülşah Kocatürk	Judo	Women +78 kg
Bronze	Vildan Doğan	Karate	Women's Under 61 kg
Bronze	Serkan Yağcı	Karate	Men's Under 75 kg
Bronze	Yıldız Aras	Karate	Women's Over 68 kg
Bronze	Gökhan Kılıç	Weightlifting	Men's 56 kg Snatch
Bronze	Aylin Daşdelen	Weightlifting	Women's 58 kg Snatch
Bronze	Semih Yağcı	Weightlifting	Men's 77 kg Snatch
Bronze	Emine Bilgin	Weightlifting	Women's 53 kg Clean&Jerk
Bronze	Erhan Karakuş	Wrestling	Men's Greco-Roman 55 kg
Bronze	Soner Sucu	Wrestling	Men's Greco-Roman 60 kg
Bronze	Abdullah Coşkun	Wrestling	Men's Greco-Roman 66 kg
Bronze	Akif Canbaş	Wrestling	Men's Greco-Roman 84 kg

== Results by event ==
=== Canoeing Flat ===
Men

Athlete	Event	Heat		Semifinal		Final	
Athlete	Event	Time	Rank	Time	Rank	Time	Rank
Orçun Karaoğlanoğlu	K–1 1000m	3:54.070	5th	3:57.510	4th	4:23.930	11th
Öztürk Kuru	K–1 1000m	4:00.710	7th	3:58.810	6th	4:26.740	12th
Orçun Karaoğlanoğlu	K–1 500m	1:53.920	6th	1:46.443	6th	2:00.637	12th
Öztürk Kuru	K–1 500m	1:55.250	7th	1:51.037	9th	2:01.555	14th
Orçun Karaoğlanoğlu; Emre Karahan	K–2 1000m	3:36.600	4th	3:37.020	1st	3:45.170	9th
Emre Karahan; Çağrıbey Yıldırım	K–2 500m	1:41.272	4th	1:42.022	4th	DNQ	

Women

Athlete	Event	Heat		Semifinal		Final	
Athlete	Event	Time	Rank	Time	Rank	Time	Rank
Gizem Şen	K–1 1000m	4:32.480	4th	4:25.910	4th	DNQ	
Gizem Şen	K–1 500m	2:10.762	6th	2:12.677	6th	DNQ	

=== Golf ===
Men

Athlete	Event	Round				Total	Par	Rank
Athlete	Event	1	2	3	4	Total	Par	Rank
Hamza Hakan Sayın	Individual	72	73	74	70	289	+1	5
Mustafa Hocaoğlu	Individual	71	74	72	72	289	+1	6
Gencer Özcan	Individual	74	70	73	73	290	+2	7
Hamza Hakan Sayın; Mustafa Hocaoğlu; Gencer Özcan	Team	143	143	145	142	573	-3	Bronze medal

Women

Athlete	Event	Round				Total	Par	Rank
Athlete	Event	1	2	3	4	Total	Par	Rank
Nejla Gerçek	Individual	76	77	74	69	296	+8	6
Elçin Ulu	Individual	76	79	73	73	301	+13	8
Begüm Yılmaz	Individual	86	85	83	82	336	+48	16
Nejla Gerçek; Elçin Ulu; Begüm Yılmaz	Team	152	156	147	142	597	+21	4

=== Gymnastics ===
==== Artistic ====
Men

Athlete	Event	Qualification		Final		Rank
Athlete	Event	Score	Rank	Score	Rank	Rank
Ferhat Arıcan	All-around	65.100	31	Did not advance		31
Ferhat Arıcan	Floor exercise	13.800	20	Did not advance		20
Ferhat Arıcan	Pommel horse	10.850	38	Did not advance		38
Ferhat Arıcan	Rings	12.550	32	Did not advance		32
Ferhat Arıcan	Vault	15.500	16	Did not advance		16
Ferhat Arıcan	Parallel bars	12.400	32	Did not advance		32
Ümit Şamiloğlu	Horizontal bar	15.400	1 Q	14.000	6	6
Muhammet Akkavak	All-around	76.550	23	Did not advance		23
Muhammet Akkavak	Floor exercise	13.500	25	Did not advance		25
Muhammet Akkavak	Pommel horse	10.550	40	Did not advance		40
Muhammet Akkavak	Rings	12.350	33	Did not advance		33
Muhammet Akkavak	Vault	14.450	33	Did not advance		33
Muhammet Akkavak	Parallel bars	12.900	26	Did not advance		26
Muhammet Akkavak	Horizontal bar	12.800	30	Did not advance		30
Yunus Emre Uyar	All-around	77.550	18 Q	73.750	17	17
Yunus Emre Uyar	Floor exercise	13.500	26	Did not advance		26
Yunus Emre Uyar	Pommel horse	12.450	23	Did not advance		23
Yunus Emre Uyar	Rings	11.900	36	Did not advance		36
Yunus Emre Uyar	Vault	15.500	18	Did not advance		18
Yunus Emre Uyar	Parallel bars	11.700	38	Did not advance		38
Yunus Emre Uyar	Horizontal bar	12.500	33	Did not advance		33
Özgür Şanlı	All-around	77.900	17 Q	78.450	14	14
Özgür Şanlı	Floor exercise	13.550	24	Did not advance		24
Özgür Şanlı	Pommel horse	11.700	30	Did not advance		30
Özgür Şanlı	Rings	11.750	37	Did not advance		37
Özgür Şanlı	Vault	14.700	26	Did not advance		26
Özgür Şanlı	Parallel bars	12.800	29	Did not advance		29
Özgür Şanlı	Horizontal bar	13.400	22	Did not advance		22

Athlete	Event	FX	PH	SR	VT	PB	HB	Total	Rank
Ferhat Arıcan; Muhammet Akkavak; Özgür Şanlı; Yunus Emre Uyar; Ümit Şamiloğlu	Team	54.350	45.550	48.550	60.150	49.800	54.100	312.500	8

Women

Athlete	Event	Qualification		Final		Rank
Athlete	Event	Score	Rank	Score	Rank	Rank
Göksu Üçtaş	All-around	49.200	11 Q	51.750	7	7
Göksu Üçtaş	Vault	14.100	2 Q	13.650	2	Silver medal
Göksu Üçtaş	Uneven bars	12.000	15	Did not advance		15
Göksu Üçtaş	Balance beam	10.800	18	Did not advance		18
Göksu Üçtaş	Floor exercise	12.300	17	Did not advance		17

=== Karate ===
Women's kumite

Athlete	Event	1/8 final	Quarterfinal	Semifinal	Final	Rank
Gülderen Çelik	50 kg	Bye	(Serbia) Stojovic; W HAN	(Greece) Kosmidou; W 2–1	(Italy) Cardin; W 2–1	Gold medal
Serap Özçelik	55 kg	(Serbia) Strika; W 3–0	(France) Samy; L 1–8	Did not advance		5

=== Water skiing ===
Women

Athlete	Event	Preliminary		Final	
Athlete	Event	Score	Rank	Score	Rank
Aylin Parla	Wakeboard	6.45	4 Q	5.23	5
Nergiz Onaran	Wakeboard	3.56	5 Q	11.23	4
