= Libya at the 2009 Mediterranean Games =

- IOC code: LBA
- NOC: Libyan Olympic Committee

in Pescara
- Medals Ranked 18th: Gold 1 Silver 0 Bronze 6 Total 7

Mediterranean Games appearances
- 1951; 1955; 1959; 1963; 1967; 1971; 1975; 1979; 1983; 1987; 1991; 1993; 1997; 2001; 2005; 2009; 2013; 2018; 2022

Libya sent a delegation of 81 athletes to the 2009 Mediterranean Games. These athletes won a total of 1 gold medal and 6 bronze medals.
