= Hanene Ourfelli =

Tunisian weightlifter

Personal information
- Full name: Hanene Al-Orfelli
- Nationality: Tunisia
- Born: 8 January 1986 (age 40)
- Height: 1.71 m (5 ft 7 1/2 in)
- Weight: 64 kg (141 lb)

Sport
- Sport: Weightlifting
- Event: 63 kg

Hanene Ourfelli (by birth Al-Orfelli; Arabic: حنان الورفلي, romanized: Ḥanān al-Warfallī; born January 8, 1986) is a Tunisian weightlifter. Ourfelli represented Tunisia at the 2008 Summer Olympics in Beijing, where she competed for the women's middleweight category (63 kg). Ourfelli placed sixteenth in this event, as she successfully lifted 80 kg in the single-motion snatch, and hoisted 95 kg in the two-part, shoulder-to-overhead clean and jerk, for a total of 175 kg.
