= Mario Delač =

Croatian swimmer

Personal information
- Born: March 15, 1985 (age 41) Zagreb, Yugoslavia

Sport
- Sport: Swimming

Mario Delač (born March 15, 1985) is a freestyle swimmer from Croatia, who made his Olympic debut for his native country at the 2004 Summer Olympics in Athens, Greece. There he competed in the 200 m Freestyle, and as a member of the 4 × 100 m Freestyle Relay Team. He also competed in the Croatian National Championships, where he won three gold medals.

Delač trained at The Race Club, a swimming club founded by Olympic Swimmers Gary Hall, Jr. and his father, Gary Hall, Sr. The Race Club, originally known as "The World Team," was designed to serve as a training group for elite swimmers across the world in preparation for the 2000 Sydney Olympic Games. To be able to train with the Race Club, one must either have been ranked in the top 20 in the world the past 3 calendar years or top 3 in their nation in the past year. The Race Club included such well known swimmers as Roland Mark Schoeman, Mark Foster, Ryk Neethling, and Therese Alshammar.
