= Slovenia at the 2009 Mediterranean Games =

- IOC code: SLO
- NOC: Olympic Committee of Slovenia

in Pescara
- Medals Ranked 9th: Gold 7 Silver 9 Bronze 10 Total 26

Mediterranean Games appearances (overview)
- 1993; 1997; 2001; 2005; 2009; 2013; 2018; 2022

Other related appearances
- Yugoslavia (1951–1991)

Slovenia competed at the 2009 Mediterranean Games held in Pescara, Italy. It won 7 gold, 9 silver and 10 bronze medals.

== Medalists ==
Medal	Name	Sport	Event
Gold	Bostjan Macek	Shooting	Men's Trap
Gold	Anja Klinar	Swimming	Women's 400 m individual medley
Gold	Tim Gornik	Golf	Men's Individual-Team
Gold	Urška Žolnir	Judo	Women -63 kg Half-Middle
Gold	Aljaž Sedej	Judo	Men -81 kg Half-Middle
Gold	Lucija Polavder	Judo	Women +78 kg Heavy
Gold	Špela Ponomarenko	Canoeing	Women's K1 500m
Silver	Aljaž Pegan	Gymnastics	Men's Horizontal bar
Silver	Luka Špik and Jan Špik	Rowing	Men's double sculls
Silver	Nina Cesar	Swimming	Women's 800 m Freestyle
Silver	Emil Tahirovič	Swimming	Men's 50 m Breaststroke
Silver	Sabina Veit	Athletics	Women's 200 m
Silver	Ales Borcnik	Bowls	Men's Progressive throw
Silver	Petra Pivk	Bowls	Women's Progressive throw
Silver	Marko Kump	Cycling road	Men's Road Race
Silver	Raša Sraka	Judo	Women -70 kg Middle
Bronze	Anja Klinar	Swimming	Women's 200 m individual medley
Bronze	Kranjc Mitja	Athletics	Men's Javelin Throw
Bronze	Peter Mankoč	Swimming	Men's 100 m butterfly
Bronze	Slovenia team	Rowing	Men's lightweight double sculls
Bronze	Slovenia team	Volleyball	Men's
