= Orçun Karaoğlanoğlu =

Turkish sprint kayaker

Personal information
- Full name: Orçun Tolga Karaoğlanoğlu
- Nationality: Turkish
- Born: October 1, 1987 (age 38) Balıkesir, Turkey

Sport
- Sport: Kayaking
- Event(s): K-1 1000m, K-1 500m, K-4 1000m
Medal record
Gold medal – first place	2009 Boulogne	K-4 500 m
Bronze medal – third place	2009 Boulogne	K-4 1000 m

Orçun Tolga Karaoğlanoğlu (born 1 October 1987) is a Turkish sprint kayaker. He was born in Balıkesir, Turkey. He is a student of the Turkish Naval Academy (Turkish: Deniz Harp Okulu), and competes for his school's team.

== Sports career ==
=== Club ===
Karaoğlanoğlu won the K-1 200m, K-1 1000m and K-2 1000m events at the 2006 Spring Flatwater Canoeing Cup at Lake Sapanca in Sakarya Province. In 2007, he was admitted to the Turkey national canoeing team after he won the K-1 1000m, K-2 500m and K-2 1000m events at the 2007 Spring Flatwater Canoeing Cup held at Lake Seyhan Dam, Adana.

=== International ===
In 2005, he took part in the juniors K1-1000m event of European Canoe Flatwater Junior and U-23 Championships in Plovdiv, Bulgaria. Karaoğlanoğlu competed in the K1-1000m and K4-1000m events at the 2007 ICF Canoe Sprint World Championships in Duisburg, Germany without advancing to the finals. In 2008, he raced in the K1-1000m event at the 3rd World Canoe Cup in Poznań, Poland. He unsuccessfully competed in the K-1 1000m, K-4 200m and K-4 500m events at the 2008 Canoe Sprint European Championships in Milan, Italy for the participation at the 2008 Summer Olympics. Karaoğlanoğlu took part at the International Boulogne Flatwater Canoeing Championship held in Boulogne, France on 25–26 April 2009. He won a gold medal in the K4-500m event and a bronze medal in the K4-1000m race with his teammates Çağrı Beyyıldırım, Emre Karahan and Öztürk Kuru. He represented Turkey in the K1-500m and K1-1000m events at the 2009 Mediterranean Games in Pescara, Italy without reaching to a medal.
