= Rhythmic gymnastics at the 2009 Mediterranean Games =

Rhythmic Gymnastics individual all-around competition at the 2009 Mediterranean Games was held in Pescara, Italy.

== Competition schedule ==
Competitions followed this timetable:

●	Competitions	●	Finals

June/July
26	27	28	29	30	01	02	03	04	05
●	●								

== Medal winners ==
=== Women's ===
Games	Gold		Silver		Bronze	
Individual	ITA Julieta Cantaluppi	103.550	FRA Delphine Ledoux	100.675	ESP Carolina Rodriguez	99.425

== Medal table ==
Rank	Nation	Gold	Silver	Bronze	Total
1	Italy (ITA)	1	0	0	1
2	France (FRA)	0	1	0	1
3	Spain (ESP)	0	0	1	1
Totals (3 entries)		1	1	1	3

== Results ==
Rank	Nation	Name	Points
1	Italy	Julieta Cantaluppi	103.550
2	France	Delphine Ledoux	100.675
3	Spain	Carolina Rodríguez	99.425
4	Italy	Chiara Ianni	98.950
5	Greece	Michaela Metallidou	95.175
6	Slovenia	Mojca Rode	93.825
7	Turkey	Pinar Akilveren	92.900
8	Turkey	Burçin Neziroglu	92.750
9	Cyprus	Chrystalleni Trikomiti	91.850
10	Cyprus	Loukia Trikomiti	89.525
