= Spain at the 2009 Mediterranean Games =

- IOC code: ESP
- NOC: Spanish Olympic Committee

in Pescara
- Medals Ranked 3rd: Gold 28 Silver 21 Bronze 34 Total 83

Mediterranean Games appearances (overview)
- 1951; 1955; 1959; 1963; 1967; 1971; 1975; 1979; 1983; 1987; 1991; 1993; 1997; 2001; 2005; 2009; 2013; 2018; 2022

Spain competed at the 2009 Mediterranean Games held in Pescara, Italy.

== Medals ==
| 1st | 2nd | 3rd | Rank | Ref |
| 28 | 21 | 34 | 3 | |
