= Egypt at the 2009 Mediterranean Games =

- IOC code: EGY
- NOC: Egyptian Olympic Committee

in Pescara
- Medals Ranked 7th: Gold 11 Silver 11 Bronze 12 Total 34

Mediterranean Games appearances (overview)
- 1951; 1955; 1959–1967; 1971; 1975; 1979; 1983; 1987; 1991; 1993; 1997; 2001; 2005; 2009; 2013; 2018; 2022

Other related appearances
- United Arab Republic (1959, 1963)

Egypt, with eleven gold medals, ten silver medals, and thirteen bronze medals, ranked at number seven in the 2009 Mediterranean Games.
