= 2009 Mediterranean Games =

16th edition of the Mediterranean Games

XVI Mediterranean Games Pescara 2009
- Host city: Pescara, Italy
- Motto: The Mediterranean – One Sea – One Dream
- Nations: 23
- Athletes: 3,368 (2,183 men and 1,185 women)
- Events: 28 sports
- Opening: 25 June 2009
- Closing: 5 July 2009
- Opened by: Renato Schifani, President of the Italian Senate
- Main venue: Stadio Adriatico

The 2009 Mediterranean Games, officially the XVI Mediterranean Games (Italian: XVI Giochi del Mediterraneo) and commonly known as Pescara 2009, was a multi-sport event held in Pescara, Italy, from 26 June to 5 July 2009. It was governed by the International Committee of Mediterranean Games (ICMG) (French: Comité international des Jeux méditerranéens). A total of 3,368 athletes (2,183 men and 1,185 women) from 23 National Olympic Committees (NOCs) participated in the Games. Montenegro participated for the first time at the Mediterranean Games, after their independence in 2006. The program included competitions in 24 different sports, including three non-Olympic sports – bocce, karate, and water skiing – and golf, which was reinstated as an official Olympic sport in 2016 Summer Olympics. Water skiing was introduced as a demonstration sport. Two disabled sports, athletics and swimming, were also contested in the Games. Italy became the first nation to host the Mediterranean Games three times, having previously hosted them in Naples (1963) and Bari (1997).

Pescara was awarded the Games on 18 October 2003 in Almeria, Spain, which was the host of 2005 Mediterranean Games, defeating bids from Rijeka and Patras. The organising committee of the Games, Comitato Organizzatore dei XVI Giochi del Mediterraneo (COJM), was created in 2006 to oversee the staging of the Games. A total of 33 venues were used to host the events, including Stadio Adriatico — main stadium of the Pescara Games, hosted both the opening and closing ceremonies, as well as the athletics competition and football final. Many events took place in several different cities. The official logo of the 2009 Mediterranean Games featured simple graphical illustrations of mountains and sea of the Abruzzo region, and the Marsican brown bear was chosen as the mascot of the Games.

Athletes from 21 countries won medals, leaving two countries without a medal; 18 of them won at least one gold medal. A total of 782 medals – 243 gold, 244 silver and 295 bronze – were awarded. Competitors from the host nation, Italy, led the medal table for the eleventh time in the history of the Games, with 64 gold medals. Italian swimmer Federica Pellegrini and Spanish swimmer Aschwin Wildeboer set new world records in their respective events.

== Background ==
The Mediterranean Games is a multi-sport event, much like the Summer Olympics (albeit on a much smaller scale), with participation exclusively from countries around the Mediterranean Sea where Europe, Africa, and Asia meet. The Games started in 1951 and are held every four years. The idea of holding the Mediterranean Games originated with Muhammed Taher Pasha, who was the chairman of the Egyptian Olympic Committee and the vice-president of the International Olympic Committee (IOC), at a meeting during the 1948 London Olympics. The Games "were designed specifically to bring together the Muslim and European countries surrounding the Mediterranean basin" to promote understanding through sporting competition.

The first edition of the Mediterranean Games was held in the Egyptian city of Alexandria in 1951, attracting 734 competitors from 10 nations. Female athletes were not allowed to compete. Italy hosted the Games for the first time in 1963 in Naples, the fourth edition of the Games. Naples was the second in Europe (following Barcelona in 1955) to host the Games. Thirty-four years later, another Italian city, Bari, hosted the Games.

== Organisation ==
=== Selection of host city ===
Location of Pescara in Italy

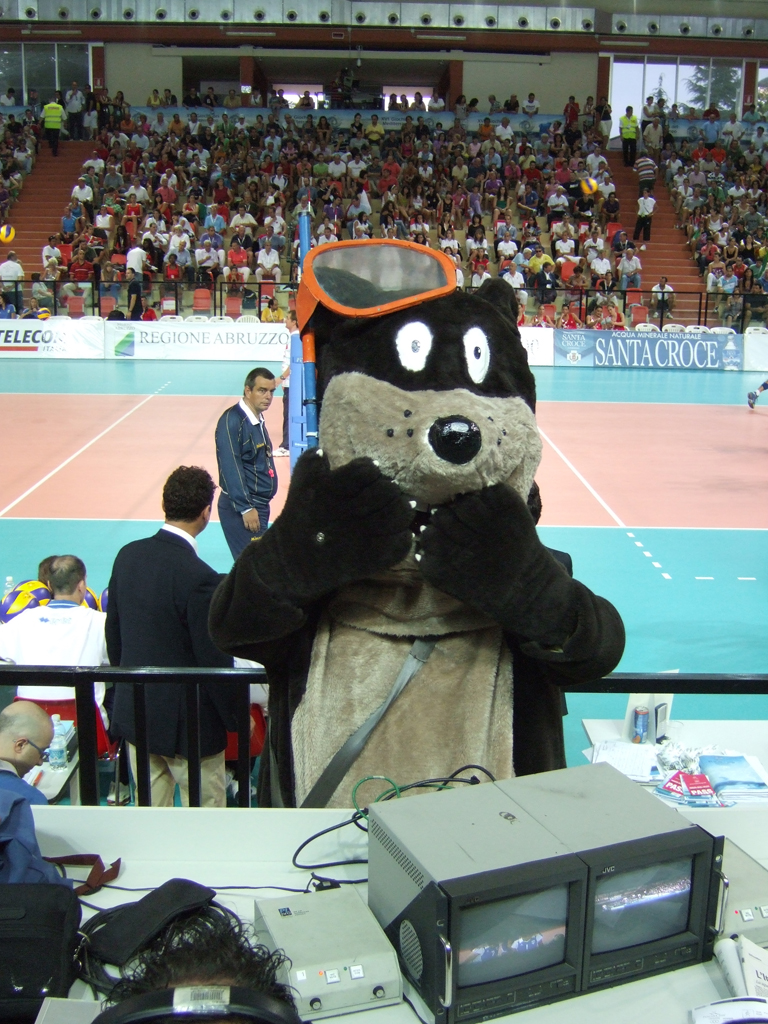
Games mascot

Pescara was elected as the host city for the 2009 Mediterranean Games on 18 October 2003 in Almeria, Spain, defeating bids from Rijeka and Patras. The decision for the host city was made after the voting by members of the International Committee of Mediterranean Games, held in Almeria, host of the 2005 Mediterranean Games. Croatia's bidding city, Rijeka, was the first city to be eliminated, followed by Patras, Greece's bidding city. This was the third time that any Italian city hosted this multi-sport event.

Croatian delegates were outraged by the final decision, particularly as this was their third bid in recent years; Croatia made bids in 1995 and 1999 for the 1997 and 2001 Mediterranean Games, respectively. Former Prime Minister of Croatia and the president of the Croatian Olympic Committee Zlatko Mateša expressed his disappointment: "It just shows, once again, that small countries have no chance of competing with the big ones". The Croatian bid was supported by the president and CEO of Formula One Management and Formula One Administration Bernie Ecclestone, 1992 Olympic bronze medallist in tennis Goran Ivanišević and 1998 FIFA World Cup Golden Shoe Award winner Davor Šuker.

=== Organising committee ===
The Comitato Organizzatore dei XVI Giochi del Mediterraneo – Pescara 2009 (English: Organizing Committee of the XVI Mediterranean Games – Pescara 2009; abbreviated as COJM) was created in 2006 to oversee the staging of the Games. The committee was in charge of implementing and staging the Games, and to maintain the infrastructure and provide other services. The committee's board of directors consisted of politicians, IOC members from Italy, and presidents of the various Italian sports governing bodies. Mario Pescante was appointed as the Commissioner Extraordinary of the Games in 2008 by the Italian Government. He had held the same office during the 2006 Winter Olympic, held in Turin.

A few weeks before the Games on 18 May, Sabatino Aracu resigned from his post of the president of the organising committee in order to allow its dissolution, which according to him was "incapable of taking urgent measures". Aracu's decision was reportedly motivated by the bureaucratic reasons. He was later appointed Honorary President of the Games.

=== Logo and mascot ===
Mascot

The official logo of this edition of the Mediterranean Games featured simple graphical illustrations of mountains and sea of the Abruzzo region. Pescara is the capital of Province of Pescara which is situated in the Abruzzo region. The official mascot was a Marsican brown bear, called Aua', wearing a diving mask and flip-flops with swimfins in his hands. The Marsican brown bear is a highly threatened, unrecognised subspecies of the Brown bear, with a range restricted to the Abruzzo National Park. The mascot was unveiled by the Mediterranean Games Executive Committee during their meeting in Pescara from 24 to 28 March 2008.

=== Medals ===
The medals of the Games were designed and produced by the Italian company, Coinart, specialising in the manufacture of medals, jewellery, badges, plaques, and trophies. The medals were made up of brass, bronze, and gold. The obverse features the Games logo, stylised shape of an athlete posed to plunge into the waves, with the inscription "Pescara 2009" and XVI Jeux méditerranéens in French and the ICMG logo at bottom—three interlocking rings, representing Africa, Asia and Europe. The reverse features the Warrior of Capestrano (Italian: Guerriero di Capestrano), a fourth-century BC statue, measures more than two metres in height. The statue was discovered in 1934 in Capestrano, Province of L'Aquila, Abruzzo region. It is widely considered to be an archaeological evidence of the pre-Roman settlements in Abruzzo.

=== Venues ===
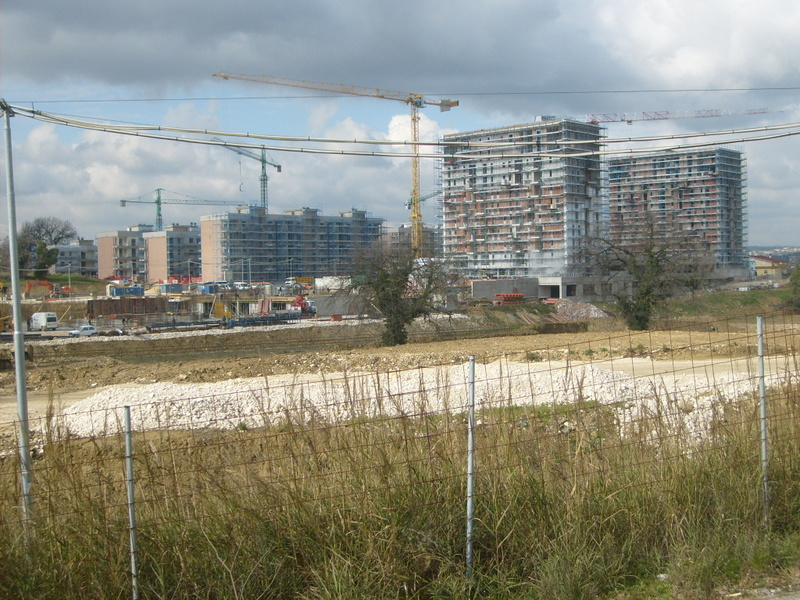
Games village under development.

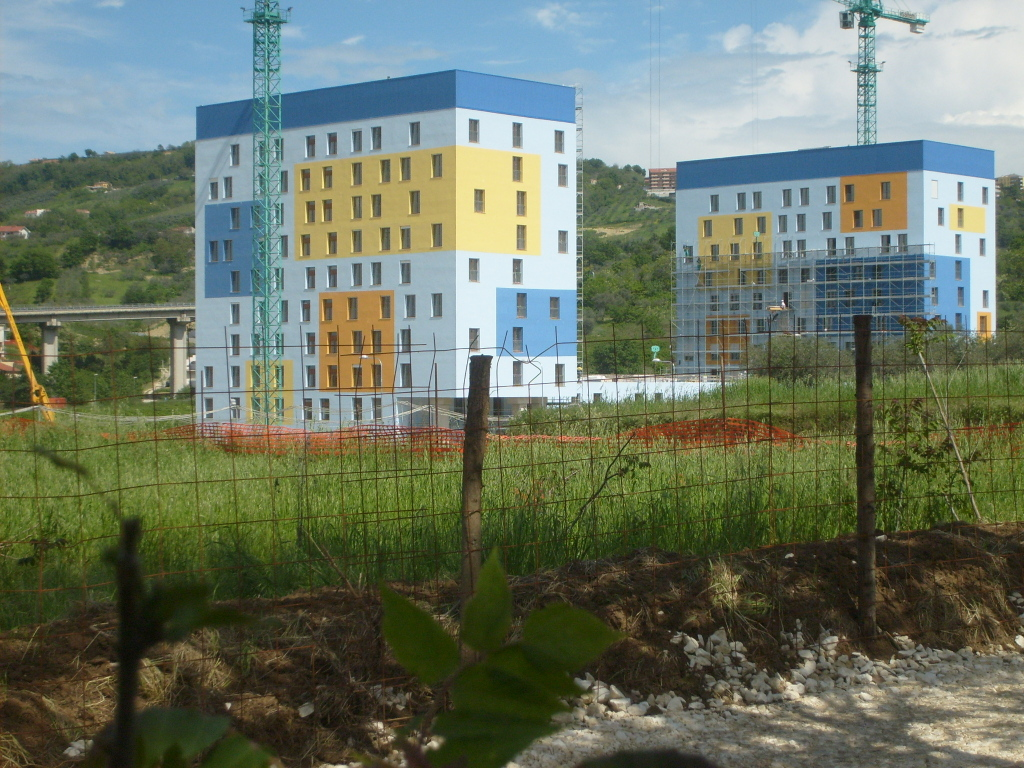
Completed blocks of the village.

The main stadium of the 2009 Mediterranean Games was Stadio Adriatico. The stadium received major renovations and upgrades at a cost of about €10 million. It hosted the opening ceremonies as well as the athletics competition and football final. A total of 33 venues were used to host the events during the Games. Many events took place in several different cities.

The Mediterranean Village provided accommodation and training for athletes of the Games. It was designed by the Italian architect Paolo Desideri, and the total cost of the project was €150 million. It was located in the municipality of Chieti and was spread over an area of 18 acres (7.3 ha; 0.028 sq mi), including a 7 acres (2.8 ha; 0.011 sq mi) public park. More than 450 apartments accommodated athletes and team officials.

The village was designed according to modern architecture and was said to have adopted green features like solar water heating. Key facilities such as a restaurant, medical centre, and a conference hall with a seating capacity of 800 people were hosted there. Rhythmic gymnast Fabrizia D'Ottavio was appointed the mayor of the village.

List of venues, showing the city, venue, sport and venue capacity
City	Venue	Sport	Capacity	Ref
Pescara	Stadio Adriatico	Athletics	22,000	
Pescara	Stadio Adriatico	Football	22,000	
Chieti	Stadio Guido Angelini	Football	12,750	
Lanciano	Stadio Guido Biondi	Football	6,500	
L'Aquila	Stadio Tommaso Fattori	Football	5,000	
Francavilla al mare	Stadio Valle Anzuca	Football	1,500	
Teramo	Stadio Comunale	Football	8,000	
Pescara	Stadio del mare	Beach volleyball	2,000	
Pescara	Stadio Adriano Flacco	Bocce	800–1,000	
Bomba	Lago di Bomba	Canoeing	1,000	
Bomba	Lago di Bomba	Rowing	1,000	
Pescara	Street circuit	Cycling		
Chieti	PalaTricalle	Artistic gymnastics	2,400	
Silvi	Pala Universo	Artistic gymnastics	2,000	
Miglianico	Golf Club Miglianico	Golf		
Pescara	Stadio Adriatico	Disabled athletics	22,000	
Pescara	Piscine Le Naiadi	Disabled swimming	4,000	
Pescara	Centro Sportivo Febo	Judo	800–1,500	
Pescara	Centro Sportivo Febo	Wrestling	800–1500	
Pescara	Piscine Le Naiadi	Swimming	4,000	
Pescara	Centro Sportivo Febo	Karate	800–1,500	
Pescara	PalaElettra	Basketball	2,000	
Pescara	PalaElettra II	Basketball	555	
Teramo	PalaScapriano	Basketball	3,500	
Roseto degli Abruzzi	PalaMaggetti	Basketball	4,000	
Ortona	Palasport	Basketball	1,450	
Pescara	Palasport Giovanni Paolo II	Handball	2,000	
Chieti	Palasport Santa Filomena	Women's handball	1,500	
Pescara	Piscine Le Naiadi	Water polo	4,000	
Chieti	PalaTricalle	Volleyball	2,400	
Montesilvano	PalaRoma Montesilvano	Volleyball	1,500	
Vasto	Sports Hall of Vasto	Volleyball	1,700	
Avezzano	Palaghiaccio	Boxing	2,000	
Pineto	PalaVolley S. Maria	Fencing	1,000	
Pescara	Arena del Mare	Water skiing	2,000	
Pescara	PalaRigopiano	Weightlifting	1,200	
Chieti	Centro ippico "Teaterno"	Equestrian	1,000	
Pescara	Tennis Club Pescara	Tennis	1,500	
Lanciano	Palasport	Table tennis	2,000	
Pescara	Centro Sportivo Febo	Shooting	100	
Manoppello	Poligono S.Uberto	Trap shooting	1,000	
Pescara	City marina	Sailing	2,000	

== Calendar ==
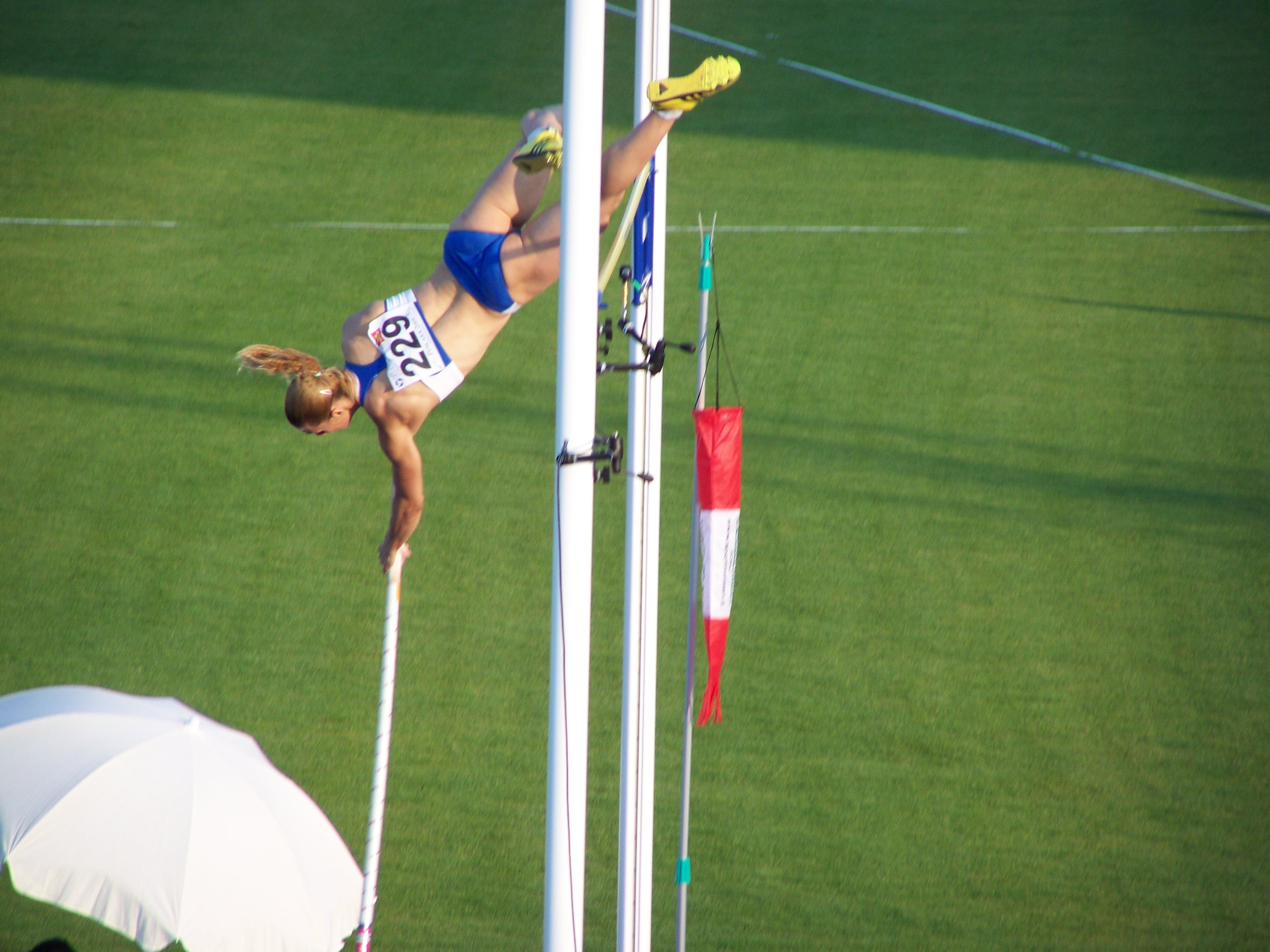
Greek athlete Nikoleta Kyriakopoulou during the women's pole vault event.

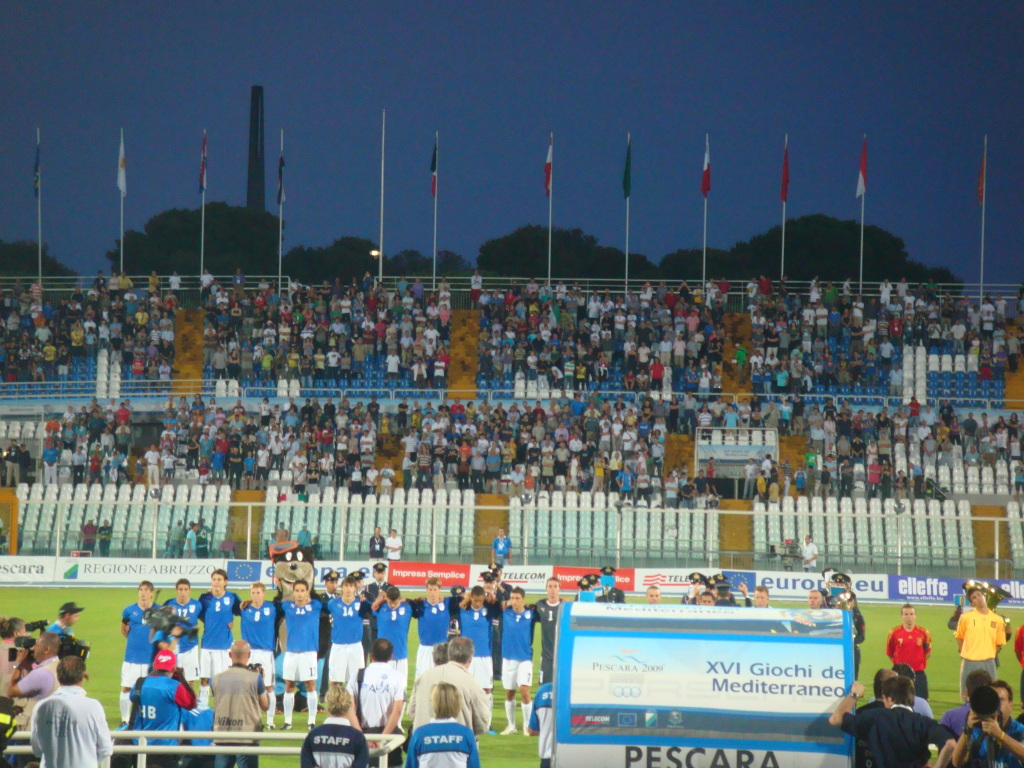
Football final in between Italy and Spain.

In the following calendar for the 2009 Mediterranean Games, each blue box represents an event competition, such as a qualification round, on that day. The yellow boxes represent days during which medal-awarding finals for a sport were held. On the left the calendar lists each sport with events held during the Games. There is a key at the top of the calendar to aid the reader.

Although the Games officially began on 26 June 2009, the first football games were held on 25 June. Opening ceremony was held on 26 June, and on the same day Tunisian weightlifter Khalil El-Maaoui won the first gold medal of the Games in the men's 56 kg event.

●	Opening ceremony	●	Competitions	●	Event finals	●	Closing ceremony

	June/July										
Sport	25	26	27	28	29	30	01	02	03	04	05
Ceremonies		●									●
Athletics						●	●	●	●		
Basketball		●	●	●	●	●	●	●	●	●	
Beach volley				●	●	●	●	●	●		
Bocce				●	●	●	●	●	●		
Boxing			●	●	●	●	●	●			
Canoeing									●	●	●
Cycling						●			●		
Disabled sports						●	●	●			
Equestrian							●		●		
Fencing				●	●	●					
Football	●		●		●		●		●	●	●
Golf					●	●	●	●			
Artistic and Rhythmic Gymnastics		●	●		●	●	●	●	●		
Handball		●	●	●	●	●	●	●	●	●	●
Judo								●	●	●	●
Karate						●	●				
Rowing			●	●	●						
Sailing				●	●	●	●	●	●	●	
Shooting			●	●	●	●	●	●	●		
Swimming			●	●	●	●					
Table tennis						●	●	●	●	●	
Tennis			●	●	●	●	●				
Volleyball				●	●	●	●	●	●	●	●
Water polo						●	●	●	●		●
Waterskiing			●	●	●						
Weightlifting		●	●	●	●	●					
Wrestling		●	●	●	●						
June/July	25	26	27	28	29	30	01	02	03	04	05

== Games ==
=== Opening ceremony ===
The opening ceremony officially began at 9:00 pm Central European Summer Time (UTC+02:00) on 26 June in the Stadio Adriatico. Italian entrepreneur Marco Balich, who coordinated the opening ceremony of the 2006 Winter Olympics, held in Turin, was its producer and director, with "music moments and stage actions" were developed by the choreography director Doug Jack. K-events (now Filmmaster Events), subsidiary of the Italian holding company Filmmaster Group, was responsible for the organisation of the opening and closing ceremonies.

The ceremony, among other dignitaries and guests, included the president of the International Olympic Committee Jacques Rogge, president of the ICMG Amar Addadi, Italian Prime Minister Silvio Berlusconi, Albert II, Prince of Monaco, Commissioner Extraordinary of the Games Mario Pescante, president of the Pescara Games organising committee Sabatino Aracu, European Olympic Committee (EOC) president Patrick Hickey, president of the Italian National Olympic Committee (Italian: Comitato Olimpico Nazionale Italiano (CONI)) Gianni Petrucci and the EOC and CONI secretary general Raffaele Pagnozzi.

The cultures of Abruzzi Region and Mediterranean were highlighted in the two-and-a-half hours long opening ceremony. The stadium was full to its 25,000 capacity. A special tribute was presented to the victims of the 2009 L'Aquila earthquake, occurred in the region of Abruzzo on 6 April; Italian flag was carried by the Italian Special Forces, "who were the first to arrive in L’Aquila". The ceremony featured a special performance by the Italian Air Force. Italian musician and singer-songwriter Eros Ramazzotti sang "L'orizzonte" from his 2009 studio album Ali e radici. The main attraction of the ceremony was the "Water Ceremony". The "water journey" took place through the villages most stricken by the earthquake and ended at the stadium.

=== Sports ===
The programme for the Pescara Games included 24 sports and 245 events. Two disabled sports – athletics and swimming – were also held, each comprising two events. Three sports were open only to men – boxing, football and water polo – while rhythmic gymnastics and two events of fencing (foil and sabre) were open only to women. Equestrian was the only sport in which men and women competed together. Water skiing was added as a demonstration sport.

Numbers in parentheses indicate the number of medal events contested in each sport.

- Aquatics
  - Swimming (38)
  - Water polo (1)
- Athletics (40)
- Basketball (2)
- Bocce (10)
- Boxing (11)
- Canoeing
  - Sprint (6)
- Cycling
  - Road (3)
- Disabled sports
  - Athletics (2)
  - Swimming (2)
- Equestrian
  - Jumping (2)
- Fencing (4)
- Football (1)
- Golf (4)
- Gymnastics
  - Artistic gymnastics (14)
  - Rhythmic gymnastics (1)
- Handball (2)
- Judo (14)
- Karate (10)
- Rowing (8)
- Sailing (4)
- Shooting (13)
- Table tennis (4)
- Tennis (4)
- Volleyball
  - Beach volleyball (2)
  - Volleyball (2)
- Water skiing (6)
- Weightlifting (22)
- Wrestling (17)

=== Closing ceremony ===
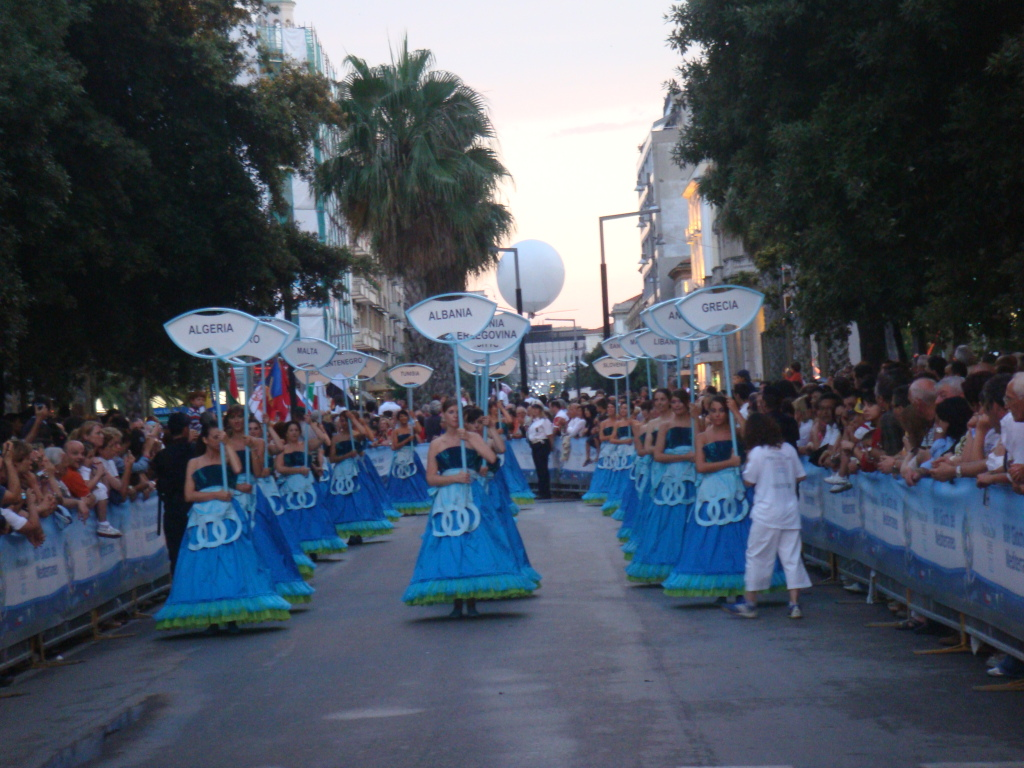
Young ladies carrying signs with the participating country's name in Italian during the closing ceremony.

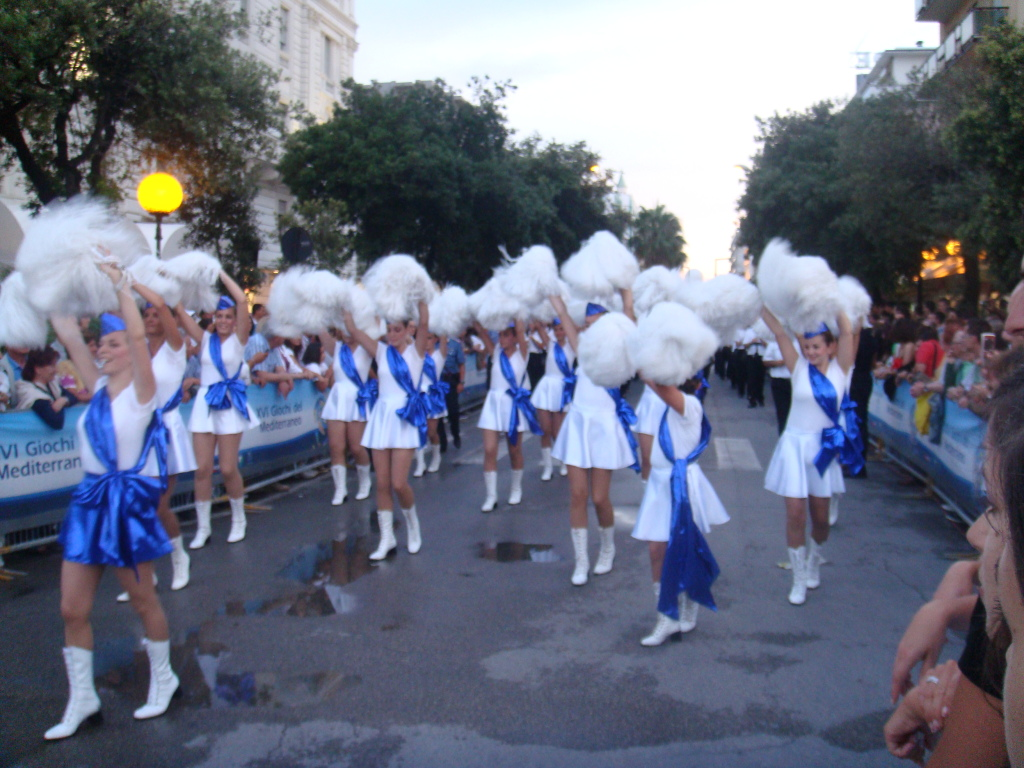
Majorettes during the closing ceremony.

The 2009 Mediterranean Games closing ceremony concluded the Pescara Games on 5 July. It began at 9:00 pm Central European Summer Time (UTC+2:00), and took place on the streets of the city. The "main element" of the ceremony was white, and spectators were asked by the organisers to wear white clothing. The event was directed by Marco Balich and organised by K-events.

The ceremony included the handover of the Games from Pescara to Volos, co-host of the 2013 Mediterranean Games with Larissa. The Italian army's brass band played the Italian national anthem, Il Canto degli Italiani. The Mayor of Pescara, Luigi Albore Mascia, then handed the Mediterranean Games flag to the president of the International Committee for the Mediterranean Games, Amar Addadi, who in turn passed it to Aleksandros Voulgaris, the Mayor of Volos. The closing act of the ceremony was the romanza of Mario Cavaradossi "E lucevan le stelle", performed by local pop singer Piero Mazzocchetti, who was specially chosen for this purpose by the president of the organising committee Sabatino Aracu.

== Medal count ==
Athletes from 21 countries won medals, leaving two countries without a medal, and 18 of them won at least one gold medal. Andorra and Lebanon did not win any medal. Athens Olympics silver medallist in 200 metre freestyle, Federica Pellegrini of Italy made a new world record in the 400 metres freestyle event. Spanish swimmer Aschwin Wildeboer set a new world record in 100 metres backstroke.

Key

* Host nation

Rank	Nation	Gold	Silver	Bronze	Total
1	Italy (ITA)*	64	49	63	176
2	France (FRA)	48	53	41	142
3	Spain (ESP)	28	21	34	83
4	Greece (GRE)	19	14	31	64
5	Turkey (TUR)	18	20	25	63
6	Tunisia (TUN)	15	9	13	37
7	Egypt (EGY)	11	11	12	34
8	Serbia (SRB)	9	13	13	35
9	Slovenia (SLO)	7	9	10	26
10	Morocco (MAR)	6	9	6	21
Total		243	244	295	782

== Participating nations ==
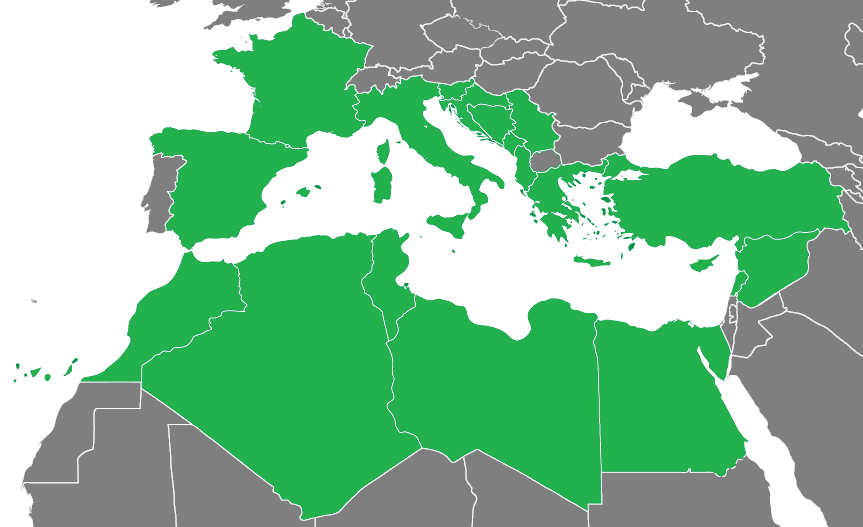
Participating countries

A total of 3,368 athletes (2,183 men and 1,185 women) from 23 member nations of the International Committee of Mediterranean Games participated (ICMG) in the Games. The number of participating countries was the greatest in Mediterranean Games history (equivalent to Tunis 2005). The total number of female athletes was an all-time high. Women took part in the Games for the first time in 1967. Italy and Greece had the largest teams, with 452 athletes for Italy and 391 for Greece. Andorra sent the smallest delegation of 13 members.

All but one of the 24 National Olympic Committees that were member of the ICMG, as of 2009, participated in the Pescara Games, the exception being Republic of Macedonia. Montenegro, after their independence in 2006, participated for the first time at the Mediterranean Games. The states of Serbia and Montenegro, which participated at the 2005 Mediterranean Games jointly as Serbia and Montenegro, competed separately. The Montenegrin Olympic Committee was accepted as a new National Olympic Committee by the International Olympic Committee in 2007.

- Albania (151 athletes)
- Algeria (116)
- Andorra (13)
- Bosnia and Herzegovina (83)
- Croatia (163)
- Cyprus (70)
- Egypt (70)
- France (359)
- Greece (391)
- Italy (452)
- Lebanon (36)
- Libya (81)
- Malta (43)
- Monaco (15)
- Montenegro (107)
- Morocco (129)
- San Marino (30)
- Serbia (154)
- Slovenia (135)
- Spain (249)
- Syria (60)
- Tunisia (129)
- Turkey (332)

== See also ==
- Mediterranean Games
- 2009 Mediterranean Games medal table
- European Olympic Committees

Preceded by Almería	Mediterranean Games; Pescara; 2009	Succeeded by Mersin
