= France at the 2009 Mediterranean Games =

- IOC code: FRA
- NOC: French Olympic Committee

in Pescara
- Medals Ranked 2nd: Gold 48 Silver 53 Bronze 41 Total 142

Mediterranean Games appearances (overview)
- 1951; 1955; 1959; 1963; 1967; 1971; 1975; 1979; 1983; 1987; 1991; 1993; 1997; 2001; 2005; 2009; 2013; 2018; 2022; 2026

France competed at the 2009 Mediterranean Games held in Pescara, Italy. The country finished second to Italy in terms of total medal count and gold medal count specifically, winning a total of 140 medals (48 gold).

Several French medal winners would go on to participate on the French Olympic team.
