= Italy at the 2009 Mediterranean Games =

- IOC code: ITA
- NOC: Italian National Olympic Committee

in Pescara
- Medals Ranked 1st: Gold 64 Silver 49 Bronze 63 Total 176

Mediterranean Games appearances (overview)
- 1951; 1955; 1959; 1963; 1967; 1971; 1975; 1979; 1983; 1987; 1991; 1993; 1997; 2001; 2005; 2009; 2013; 2018; 2022; 2026

Italy competed at the 2009 Mediterranean Games held in Pescara, Italy.

== Athletics ==
Sport	Gold	Silver	Bronze	Total
Athletics	11	12	7	30
Totals (1 entries)	11	12	7	30

=== Men ===
Event	1st place, gold medalist(s)	2nd place, silver medalist(s)	3rd place, bronze medalist(s)
4×100 metres relay	Maurizio Checcucci; Simone Collio; Emanuele Di Gregorio; Fabio Cerutti		
20 km walk	Ivano Brugnetti	Giorgio Rubino	
Long jump	Fabrizio Schembri		Daniele Greco
Hammer throw	Nicola Vizzoni		
100 metres		Emanuele Di Gregorio	Fabio Cerutti
200 metres		Matteo Galvan	
5000 metres		Stefano La Rosa	
	4	4	2

=== Women ===
Event	1st place, gold medalist(s)	2nd place, silver medalist(s)	3rd place, bronze medalist(s)
400 metres	Libania Grenot	Daniela Reina	
800 metres	Elisa Cusma		
1500 metres	Elisa Cusma		
Half marathon	Anna Incerti	Rosaria Console	
High jump	Antonietta Di Martino		
Long jump	Tania Vicenzino		
Hammer throw	Silvia Salis	Clarissa Claretti	
5000 metres		Elena Romagnolo	Silvia Weissteiner
4×100 metres relay		Anita Pistone; Maria Aurora Salvagno; Giulia Arcioni; Vincenza Calì	
Shot put		Assunta Legnante	Chiara Rosa
Javelin throw		Zahra Bani	
200 metres			Vincenza Calì
100 metres hurdles			Micol Cattaneo
Pole vault			Anna Giordano Bruno
	7	7	5

== See also ==
- Italy at the Mediterranean Games
