= 2025 Open Internacional de San Sebastián – Singles =

Singles
- 2025 Open Internacional de San Sebastián

Final
- Champion: Oksana Selekhmeteva
- Runner-up: (Netherlands) Anouk Koevermans
- Score: 6–0, 6–4

Events
Singles	Doubles
← 2022 ·	Open Internacional de San Sebastián	· 2026 →

Julia Grabher was the defending champion but lost in the second round to Carson Branstine.

Oksana Selekhmeteva won the title, defeating Anouk Koevermans in the final, 6–0, 6–4.

== Seeds ==
1. (Egypt) Mayar Sherif (second round)
2. (Czech Republic) Sára Bejlek (second round)
3. (Romania) Anca Todoni (second round, withdrew)
4. (Latvia) Darja Semeņistaja (semifinals)
5. (Austria) Julia Grabher (second round)
6. (Spain) Leyre Romero Gormaz (second round)
7. (Netherlands) Arantxa Rus (quarterfinals)
8. (Liechtenstein) Kathinka von Deichmann (first round)

== Draw ==
=== Key ===
- Q = Qualifier
- WC = Wild card
- LL = Lucky loser
- Alt = Alternate
- ITF = ITF entry
- PR = Protected ranking
- SR = Special ranking
- SE = Special exempt
- JE = Junior exempt
- JR = Junior Accelerator Programme entrant
- CO = College Accelerator Programme entrant
- NG = Next Gen Accelerator Program entrant
- w/o = Walkover
- r = Retired
- d = Defaulted

=== Finals ===
Semifinals
Q	(Germany) Tamara Korpatsch	2	1
Oksana Selekhmeteva	6	6
4	(Latvia) Darja Semeņistaja	5	6^{5}
(Netherlands) Anouk Koevermans	7	7^{7}

Final
Oksana Selekhmeteva	6	6
(Netherlands) Anouk Koevermans	0	4

=== Top half ===
First round
1	(Egypt) M Sherif	6	6
Q	(France) N Berecoechea	1	1
Q	(Germany) T Korpatsch	6	6
PR	(France) A Cornet	3	2
(Spain) A Bolsova	7^{7}	6
(United States) E Kalieva	6^{2}	3
(Netherlands) E Vedder	4	6	0
7	(Netherlands) A Rus	6	4	6
3	(Romania) A Todoni	1	6	6
Q	(Italy) D Spiteri	6	3	2
(Germany) C Werner	4	3
(Serbia) L Radivojević	6	6
O Selekhmeteva	6	5	6
(Croatia) T Würth	4	7	2
WC	(Spain) A Mintegi del Olmo	6	6
8	(Liechtenstein) K von Deichmann	3	2

Second round
1	(Egypt) M Sherif	1	2
Q	(Germany) T Korpatsch	6	6
(Spain) A Bolsova	3	6	4
7	(Netherlands) A Rus	6	1	6
3	(Romania) A Todoni
(Serbia) L Radivojević	w/o
O Selekhmeteva	6	6
WC	(Spain) A Mintegi del Olmo	3	4

Quarterfinals
Q	(Germany) T Korpatsch	7^{10}	3	6
7	(Netherlands) A Rus	6^{8}	6	1
(Serbia) L Radivojević	6^{3}	4
O Selekhmeteva	7^{7}	6

Semifinals
Q	(Germany) T Korpatsch	2	1
O Selekhmeteva	6	6

=== Bottom half ===
First round
5	(Austria) J Grabher	6	6
WC	(Spain) L Cortez Llorca	1	1
WC	(Spain) M Bassols Ribera	6^{4}	7	4
Q	(Canada) C Branstine	7^{7}	5	6
(Switzerland) C Naef	6	6^{3}	1
(Spain) I Burillo	3	7^{7}	6
(Spain) G Maristany	1	2
4	(Latvia) D Semeņistaja	6	6
6	(Spain) L Romero Gormaz	6	6
WC	(Spain) C Esquiva Bañuls	2	0
(Spain) Á Fita Boluda	3	6	7^{7}
(Spain) C Martínez Círez	6	2	6^{1}
(Netherlands) A Koevermans	6	3	6
LL	(Australia) T Smith	3	6	3
(Germany) N Schunk	2	1
2	(Czech Republic) S Bejlek	6	6

Second round
5	(Austria) J Grabher	1	4
Q	(Canada) C Branstine	6	6
(Spain) I Burillo	1	5
4	(Latvia) D Semeņistaja	6	7
6	(Spain) L Romero Gormaz	7	2	3
(Spain) Á Fita Boluda	5	6	6
(Netherlands) A Koevermans	6	3	6
2	(Czech Republic) S Bejlek	4	6	3

Quarterfinals
Q	(Canada) C Branstine	4	4
4	(Latvia) D Semeņistaja	6	6
(Spain) Á Fita Boluda	5	3
(Netherlands) A Koevermans	7	6

Semifinals
4	(Latvia) D Semeņistaja	5	6^{5}
(Netherlands) A Koevermans	7	7^{7}

== Qualifying ==
=== Seeds ===
1. (Germany) Tamara Korpatsch (qualified)
2. (Canada) Carson Branstine (qualified)
3. Julia Avdeeva (withdrew)
4. (Romania) Gabriela Lee (first round)
5. (Australia) Tina Smith (qualifying competition, lucky loser)
6. (Malta) Francesca Curmi (qualifying competition)
7. Anastasia Tikhonova (qualifying competition)
8. (Italy) Tatiana Pieri (first round)

=== Qualifiers ===
1. (Germany) Tamara Korpatsch
2. (Canada) Carson Branstine
3. (Italy) Dalila Spiteri
4. (France) Nahia Berecoechea

=== Lucky loser ===
1. (Australia) Tina Smith

=== Qualifying draw ===
==== First qualifier ====
First round
1	(Germany) Tamara Korpatsch	7	6
(Germany) Emily Seibold	5	2
WC	(Spain) Olga Bienzobas Fernández	1	3
5	(Australia) Tina Smith	6	6

Qualifying competition
1	(Germany) Tamara Korpatsch	6	6
5	(Australia) Tina Smith	1	1

==== Second qualifier ====
First round
2	(Canada) Carson Branstine	6	6
(Germany) Noma Noha Akugue	0	1
WC	(Italy) Enola Chiesa	1	2
6	(Malta) Francesca Curmi	6	6

Qualifying competition
2	(Canada) Carson Branstine	7	6
6	(Malta) Francesca Curmi	5	2

==== Third qualifier ====
First round
Alt	(Japan) Naoko Eto	0	0
(Italy) Dalila Spiteri	6	6
(United States) Ellie Schoppe	4	6^{2}
7	Anastasia Tikhonova	6	7^{7}

Qualifying competition
(Italy) Dalila Spiteri	6	3	6
7	Anastasia Tikhonova	2	6	2

==== Fourth qualifier ====
First round
4	(Romania) Gabriela Lee	4	3
Ekaterina Kazionova	6	6
(France) Nahia Berecoechea	6	6
8	(Italy) Tatiana Pieri	1	4

Qualifying competition
Ekaterina Kazionova	6	1	3
(France) Nahia Berecoechea	3	6	6
