= Tennis at the 2022 Mediterranean Games – Women's singles =

Women's singles
- Tennis at the 2022 Mediterranean Games

Events
Singles	men	women
Doubles	men	women
- Mediterranean Games

The Women's singles event at the 2022 Mediterranean Games will be held from 27 June to 1 July at the Habib Khelil Tennis Complex.

Guiomar Maristany of Spain won the gold medal, defeating Nuria Brancaccio of Italy in the final, 6–2, 5–7, 6–2.

Jéssica Bouzas Maneiro of Spain won the bronze medal, defeating Chiraz Bechri of Tunisia in the bronze medal match, Walkover.

== Medalists ==
Gold	Silver	Bronze
Guiomar Maristany; Spain	Nuria Brancaccio; Italy	Jéssica Bouzas Maneiro; Spain

== Seeds ==
1. (Spain) Jéssica Bouzas Maneiro (semifinals; bronze medalist)
2. (Spain) Guiomar Maristany (champion; gold medalist)
3. (Egypt) Sandra Samir (second round)
4. (Italy) Nuria Brancaccio (final; silver medalist)
5. (Turkey) Zeynep Sönmez (quarterfinals)
6. (Turkey) İlay Yörük (quarterfinals)
7. (Italy) Aurora Zantedeschi (quarterfinals)
8. (Algeria) Inès Ibbou (second round)

== Draw ==
=== Finals ===
Semifinals; 30 June
1	Jéssica Bouzas Maneiro (ESP)	7	4	3
4	Nuria Brancaccio (ITA)	5	6	6
Chiraz Bechri (TUN)	0	1^{R}
2	Guiomar Maristany (ESP)	6	3

Final; 1 July
4	Nuria Brancaccio (ITA)	2	7	2
2	Guiomar Maristany (ESP)	6	5	6
Bronze medal match
1	Jéssica Bouzas Maneiro (ESP)	w/o
Chiraz Bechri (TUN)

=== Top half ===
First round 27 June
Mariana Alves Campino (POR)	6	6^{6}	6
Feryel Ben Hassen (TUN)	2	7^{7}	1
Helene Pellicano (MLT)	4	6	7
Aya El-Sayed (EGY)	6	1	5

Second round 28 June
1	Jéssica Bouzas Maneiro (ESP)	6	6
Mariana Alves Campino (POR)	4	2
Yasmine Kabbaj (MAR)	6	6
8	Inès Ibbou (ALG)	2	4
4	Nuria Brancaccio (ITA)	w/o
Helene Pellicano (MLT)
Gresi Bajri (ALB)	1	2
5	Zeynep Sönmez (TUR)	6	6

Quarterfinals; 29 June
1	Jéssica Bouzas Maneiro (ESP)	7^{7}	6
Yasmine Kabbaj (MAR)	6^{3}	3
4	Nuria Brancaccio (ITA)	6	6
5	Zeynep Sönmez (TUR)	1	4

Semifinals; 30 June
1	Jéssica Bouzas Maneiro (ESP)	7	4	3
4	Nuria Brancaccio (ITA)	5	6	6

=== Bottom half ===
First round
Kristal Dule (ALB)	1	1
Chiraz Bechri (TUN)	6	6
Aya El Aouni (MAR)	3	7^{7}	6
Francesca Curmi (MLT)	6	6^{2}	4
Amira Benaïssa (ALG)	5	7^{7}	6
Maria Inês Fonte (POR)	7	6^{2}	4

Second round
6	İlay Yörük (TUR)	6	6
Vesa Gjinaj (KOS)	1	1
Chiraz Bechri (TUN)	6	3	6
3	Sandra Samir (EGY)	1	6	3
7	Aurora Zantedeschi (ITA)	6	7
Aya El Aouni (MAR)	4	5
Amira Benaïssa (ALG)	2	2
2	Guiomar Maristany (ESP)	6	6

Quarterfinals
6	İlay Yörük (TUR)	6	1	2
Chiraz Bechri (TUN)	4	6	6
7	Aurora Zantedeschi (ITA)	0	1
2	Guiomar Maristany (ESP)	6	6

Semifinals
Chiraz Bechri (TUN)	0	1^{R}
2	Guiomar Maristany (ESP)	6	3
