= 2022 Open Internacional de San Sebastián =

Tennis tournament

- Date: 26 September–2 October 2022
- Edition: 1st
- Category: ITF Women's World Tennis Tour
- Prize money: $60,000
- Surface: Clay / Outdoor
- Location: San Sebastián, Spain

Champions

Singles
- (Austria) Julia Grabher

Doubles
- (Spain) Aliona Bolsova / (Ukraine) Katarina Zavatska
Open Internacional de San Sebastián	· 2025 →

The 2022 Open Internacional de San Sebastián was a professional tennis tournament played on outdoor clay courts. It was the first edition of the tournament which was part of the 2022 ITF Women's World Tennis Tour. It took place in San Sebastián, Spain between 26 September and 2 October 2022.

== Champions ==
=== Singles ===
- (Austria) Julia Grabher def. (Spain) Aliona Bolsova, 6–3, 7–6^{(7–3)}

=== Doubles ===
- (Spain) Aliona Bolsova / (Ukraine) Katarina Zavatska def. (Spain) Ángela Fita Boluda / (Spain) Guiomar Maristany, 1–2, ret.

== Singles main draw entrants ==
=== Seeds ===
Country	Player	Rank^{1}	Seed
AUT	Julia Grabher	99	1
FRA	Clara Burel	103	2
	Elina Avanesyan	129	3
GEO	Ekaterine Gorgodze	162	4
AND	Victoria Jiménez Kasintseva	186	5
CZE	Brenda Fruhvirtová	195	6
CYP	Raluca Șerban	197	7
AUT	Sinja Kraus	201	8

- ^{1} Rankings are as of 19 September 2022.

=== Other entrants ===
The following players received wildcards into the singles main draw:

- (Spain) Lucía Cortez Llorca
- (Andorra) Victoria Jiménez Kasintseva
- (Spain) Carlota Martínez Círez
- (Spain) Ane Mintegi del Olmo

The following players received entry into the singles main draw using a protected ranking:

- (Colombia) Emiliana Arango

The following players received entry from the qualifying draw:

- (Algeria) Amira Benaïssa
- (France) Nahia Berecoechea
- (Romania) Oana Gavrilă
- (Germany) Jasmin Jebawy
- (Ukraine) Nadiya Kolb
- (France) Amandine Monnot

The following player received entry as a lucky loser:

- (Spain) Noelia Bouzó Zanotti
