= Tennis at the 2022 Mediterranean Games – Men's singles =

Tennis tournament at 2022 Mediterranean Games

Men's singles
- Tennis at the 2022 Mediterranean Games

Events
Singles	men	women
Doubles	men	women
- Mediterranean Games

The men's singles event at the 2022 Mediterranean Games will be held from 27 June to 1 July at the Habib Khelil Tennis Complex.

Francesco Passaro of Italy won the gold medal, defeating Carlos López Montagud of Spain in the final, 6–7, 6–4, 6–3.

Adam Moundir of Morocco won the bronze medal, defeating Elliot Benchetrit of Morocco in the bronze medal match, Walkover.

== Medalists ==
Gold	Silver	Bronze
Francesco Passaro; Italy	Carlos López Montagud; Spain	Adam Moundir; Morocco

== Seeds ==
The top four seeds received a bye into the second round.

1. (Italy) Matteo Arnaldi (second round)
2. (Italy) Francesco Passaro (champion; gold medalist)
3. (Morocco) Elliot Benchetrit (semifinals)
4. (Monaco) Lucas Catarina (quarterfinals)
5. (Spain) Álvaro López San Martín (quarterfinals)
6. (Spain) Carlos López Montagud (final; silver medalist)
7. (Turkey) Yankı Erel (second round)
8. (Cyprus) Petros Chrysochos (quarterfinals)

== Draw ==
=== Finals ===
Semifinals; 30 June
Adam Moundir (MAR)	6	0	1
6	Carlos López Montagud (ESP)	3	6	6
3	Elliot Benchetrit (MAR)	4	2
2	Francesco Passaro (ITA)	6	6

Final; 1 July
6	Carlos López Montagud (ESP)	7^{7}	4	3
2	Francesco Passaro (ITA)	6^{3}	6	6
Bronze medal match
Adam Moundir (MAR)	w/o
3	Elliot Benchetrit (MAR)

=== Top half ===
First round 27 June
M Gomes (POR)	4	1
A Moundir (MAR)	6	6
K. Maamoun (EGY)	6	7^{7}
T Sahtali (ALG)	3	6^{1}
S Dominko (SLO)	7^{7}	4	4
7	Y Erel (TUR)	6^{3}	6	6
W Abderrahman (TUN)	2	0
M Efstathiou (CYP)	6	6
M Asciak (MLT)	6	3	7^{7}
A Skorilas (GRE)	1	6	6^{3}
M Muedini (ALB)	0	1
6	C López Montagud (ESP)	6	6

Second round 28 June
1	M Arnaldi (ITA)	5	7^{7}	3
A Moundir (MAR)	7	6^{5}	6
K. Maamoun (EGY)	6	6
7	Y Erel (TUR)	4	4
4	L Catarina (MON)	6	7
M Efstathiou (CYP)	3	5
M Asciak (MLT)	2	1
6	C López Montagud (ESP)	6	6

Quarterfinals; 29 June
A Moundir (MAR)	6	6
K. Maamoun (EGY)	2	3
4	L Catarina (MON)	2	6	3
6	C López Montagud (ESP)	6	3	6

Semifinals; 30 June
A Moundir (MAR)	6	0	1
6	C López Montagud (ESP)	3	6	6

=== Bottom half ===
First round 27 June
5	Á López San Martín (ESP)	6	6
M Premzl (SLO)	4	4
A Ouakaa (TUN)	6	6
V Tashi (KOS)	3	2
L Delicata (MLT)	w/o
A Thanos (GRE)
8	P Chrysochos (CYP)	6	7
F Coelho (POR)	4	5
K Kırcı (TUR)	6	6
Y Rihane (ALG)	3	2
A Elsayed (EGY)	6	6
M De Rossi (SMR)	3	4

Second round 28 June
5	Á López San Martín (ESP)	6	6
A Ouakaa (TUN)	0	1
L Delicata (MLT)	2	1
3	E Benchetrit (MAR)	6	6
8	P Chrysochos (CYP)	7^{13}	7
K Kırcı (TUR)	6^{11}	5
A Elsayed (EGY)	6^{3}	2
2	F Passaro (ITA)	7^{7}	6

Quarterfinals; 29 June
5	Á López San Martín (ESP)	4	6^{2}
3	E Benchetrit (MAR)	6	7^{7}
8	P Chrysochos (CYP)	1	6	1
2	F Passaro (ITA)	6	1	6

Semifinals; 30 June
3	E Benchetrit (MAR)	4	2
2	F Passaro (ITA)	6	6
