= 2022 Open Internacional de San Sebastián – Singles =

Singles
- 2022 Open Internacional de San Sebastián

Final
- Champion: (Austria) Julia Grabher
- Runner-up: (Spain) Aliona Bolsova
- Score: 6–3, 7–6^{(7–3)}

Events
Singles	Doubles
Open Internacional de San Sebastián	· 2025 →

This was the first edition of the tournament.

Julia Grabher won the title, defeating Aliona Bolsova in the final, 6–3, 7–6^{(7–3)}.

== Seeds ==
1. (Austria) Julia Grabher (champion)
2. (France) Clara Burel (second round)
3. Elina Avanesyan (second round, withdrew)
4. (Georgia (country)) Ekaterine Gorgodze (first round)
5. (Andorra) Victoria Jiménez Kasintseva (second round)
6. (Czech Republic) Brenda Fruhvirtová (quarterfinals)
7. (Cyprus) Raluca Șerban (semifinals)
8. (Austria) Sinja Kraus (first round)

== Draw ==
=== Key ===
- Q = Qualifier
- WC = Wild card
- LL = Lucky loser
- Alt = Alternate
- ITF = ITF entry
- PR = Protected ranking
- SR = Special ranking
- SE = Special exempt
- JE = Junior exempt
- JR = Junior Accelerator Programme entrant
- CO = College Accelerator Programme entrant
- NG = Next Gen Accelerator Program entrant
- w/o = Walkover
- r = Retired
- d = Defaulted

=== Finals ===
Semifinals
1	(Austria) Julia Grabher	6	6
7	(Cyprus) Raluca Șerban	1	2
(Spain) Aliona Bolsova	6	7
(Netherlands) Eva Vedder	1	5

Final
1	(Austria) Julia Grabher	6	7^{7}
(Spain) Aliona Bolsova	3	6^{3}

=== Top half ===
First round
1	(Austria) J Grabher	6	7
(Romania) IL Roșca	1	5
(Turkey) İ Öz	6	4	7
Q	(Ukraine) N Kolb	2	6	5
(Spain) Á Fita Boluda	3	5
(Ukraine) K Zavatska	6	7
Q	(Romania) O Gavrilă	3	3
5/WC	(Andorra) V Jiménez Kasintseva	6	6
4	(Georgia (country)) E Gorgodze	6	4	5
(Argentina) P Ormaechea	3	6	7
T Barkova	5	2
(Spain) J Bouzas Maneiro	7	6
Q	(Algeria) A Benaïssa	7^{7}	6
Q	(Germany) J Jebawy	6^{5}	4
(Venezuela) A Gámiz	7^{7}	2	1
7	(Cyprus) R Șerban	6^{2}	6	6

Second round
1	(Austria) J Grabher	6	6
(Turkey) İ Öz	1	3
(Ukraine) K Zavatska	6	6
5/WC	(Andorra) V Jiménez Kasintseva	1	4
(Argentina) P Ormaechea	7^{7}	6
(Spain) J Bouzas Maneiro	6^{1}	2
Q	(Algeria) A Benaïssa	0	0
7	(Cyprus) R Șerban	6	6

Quarterfinals
1	(Austria) J Grabher	6	7^{7}
(Ukraine) K Zavatska	4	6^{4}
(Argentina) P Ormaechea	5	7	6^{7}
7	(Cyprus) R Șerban	7	5	7^{9}

Semifinals
1	(Austria) J Grabher	6	6
7	(Cyprus) R Șerban	1	2

=== Bottom half ===
First round
8	(Austria) S Kraus	6	6^{5}	2
(Spain) G Maristany	3	7^{7}	6
(Spain) L Romero Gormaz	7	4	1
(Spain) A Bolsova	5	6	6
(Germany) N Schunk	1	6	6
PR	(Colombia) E Arango	6	3	4
Q	(France) A Monnot	3	2
3	E Avanesyan	6	6
6	(Czech Republic) B Fruhvirtová	6	6
WC	(Spain) A Mintegi del Olmo	4	2
Q	(France) N Berecoechea	7^{7}	2	2
WC	(Spain) L Cortez Llorca	6^{4}	6	6
(Netherlands) E Vedder	6	6
LL	(Spain) N Bouzó Zanotti	2	4
WC	(Spain) C Martínez Círez	2	2
2	(France) C Burel	6	6

Second round
(Spain) G Maristany	2	7^{7}	3
(Spain) A Bolsova	6	6^{5}	6
(Germany) N Schunk	w/o
3	E Avanesyan
6	(Czech Republic) B Fruhvirtová	6	7^{7}
WC	(Spain) L Cortez Llorca	3	6^{0}
(Netherlands) E Vedder	6	6
2	(France) C Burel	0	2

Quarterfinals
(Spain) A Bolsova	3	6	6
(Germany) N Schunk	6	3	2
6	(Czech Republic) B Fruhvirtová	3	6	4
(Netherlands) E Vedder	6	2	6

Semifinals
(Spain) A Bolsova	6	7
(Netherlands) E Vedder	1	5
