= 2022 Open Internacional de San Sebastián – Doubles =

Doubles
- 2022 Open Internacional de San Sebastián

Final
- Champions: (Spain) Aliona Bolsova (Ukraine) Katarina Zavatska
- Runners-up: (Spain) Ángela Fita Boluda (Spain) Guiomar Maristany
- Score: 1–2, ret.

Events
| Singles | Doubles |
| Open Internacional de San Sebastián | · 2025 → |

This was the first edition of the tournament.

Aliona Bolsova and Katarina Zavatska won the title after Ángela Fita Boluda and Guiomar Maristany retired at 1–2 in the final.

== Seeds ==
1. (Venezuela) Andrea Gámiz / (Netherlands) Eva Vedder (semifinals)
2. (Spain) Jéssica Bouzas Maneiro / (Spain) Leyre Romero Gormaz (semifinals)
3. (Spain) Ángela Fita Boluda / (Spain) Guiomar Maristany (final, retired)
4. (Spain) Aliona Bolsova / (Ukraine) Katarina Zavatska (champions)

== Draw ==
=== Key ===
- Q = Qualifier
- WC = Wild card
- LL = Lucky loser
- Alt = Alternate
- ITF = ITF entry
- PR = Protected ranking
- SR = Special ranking
- SE = Special exempt
- JE = Junior exempt
- JR = Junior Accelerator Programme entrant
- CO = College Accelerator Programme entrant
- NG = Next Gen Accelerator Program entrant
- w/o = Walkover
- r = Retired
- d = Defaulted

=== Draw ===
1st round

Quarterfinals
1 | (Venezuela) A Gámiz (Netherlands) E Vedder | 6 | 6
(Ukraine) M Kolb (Ukraine) N Kolb | 1 | 1
3 | (Spain) Á Fita Boluda (Spain) G Maristany | 6 | 6
(France) N Berecoechea (Germany) J Jebawy | 2 | 1
(Spain) N Aranzábal (Spain) M Idiakez | 1 | 2
2 | (Spain) J Bouzas Maneiro (Spain) L Romero Gormaz | 6 | 6

Semifinals
1 | (Venezuela) A Gámiz (Netherlands) E Vedder | 3 | 5
3 | (Spain) Á Fita Boluda (Spain) G Maristany | 6 | 7
4 | (Spain) A Bolsova (Ukraine) K Zavatska | 6^{3} | 6 | [10]
2 | (Spain) J Bouzas Maneiro (Spain) L Romero Gormaz | 7^{7} | 2 | [3]

Final
3 | (Spain) Á Fita Boluda (Spain) G Maristany | 2^{r}
4 | (Spain) A Bolsova (Ukraine) K Zavatska | 1
