= Tennis at the 2022 Mediterranean Games – Women's doubles =

Women's doubles
- Tennis at the 2022 Mediterranean Games

Events
Singles	men	women
Doubles	men	women
- Mediterranean Games

The Women's doubles event at the 2022 Mediterranean Games was held from 27 June to 30 June at the Habib Khelil Tennis Complex.

Jéssica Bouzas Maneiro and Guiomar Maristany of Spain won the gold medal, defeating Francesca Curmi and Elaine Genovese of Malta in the final, 6–3, 6–2.

Nuria Brancaccio and Aurora Zantedeschi of Italy won the bronze medal, defeating Chiraz Bechri and Feryel Ben Hassen of Tunisia in the bronze medal match, Walkover.

== Medalists ==
Gold	Silver	Bronze
Jéssica Bouzas Maneiro and Guiomar Maristany; Spain	Francesca Curmi and Elaine Genovese; Malta	Nuria Brancaccio and Aurora Zantedeschi; Italy

== Seeds ==
1. Nuria Brancaccio / Aurora Zantedeschi (ITA) (semifinals; bronze medalists)
2. Jéssica Bouzas Maneiro / Guiomar Maristany (ESP) (champions; gold medalists)
3. Başak Eraydın / Doğa Türkmen (TUR) (Quarterfinals)
4. Francesca Curmi / Elaine Genovese (MLT) (final; silver medalists)

== Draw ==
First round 27 June
Mariana Alves Campino (POR); Maria Inês Fonte (POR)	3	2
Inès Bekrar (ALG); Inès Ibbou (ALG)	6	6

Quarterfinals; 28 June
1	Nuria Brancaccio (ITA); Aurora Zantedeschi (ITA)	6	6
Sandra Samir (EGY); Aya El-Sayed (EGY)	4	2
4	Francesca Curmi (MLT); Elaine Genovese (MLT)	7^{7}	7^{7}
Yasmine Kabbaj (MAR); Aya El Aouni (MAR)	6^{1}	6^{5}
Chiraz Bechri (TUN); Feryel Ben Hassen (TUN)	6^{6}	6	[10]
3	Başak Eraydın (TUR); Doğa Türkmen (TUR)	7^{7}	4	6
Inès Bekrar (ALG); Inès Ibbou (ALG)	5	3
2	Jéssica Bouzas Maneiro (ESP); Guiomar Maristany (ESP)	7	6

Semifinals; 29 June
1	Nuria Brancaccio (ITA); Aurora Zantedeschi (ITA)	6	6^{5}	7
4	Francesca Curmi (MLT); Elaine Genovese (MLT)	3	7^{7}	[10]
Chiraz Bechri (TUN); Feryel Ben Hassen (TUN)	4	3
2	Jéssica Bouzas Maneiro (ESP); Guiomar Maristany (ESP)	6	6

Final; 30 June
4	Francesca Curmi (MLT); Elaine Genovese (MLT)	3	2
2	Jéssica Bouzas Maneiro (ESP); Guiomar Maristany (ESP)	6	6
Bronze medal match 30 June
1	Nuria Brancaccio (ITA); Aurora Zantedeschi (ITA)	w/o
Chiraz Bechri (TUN); Feryel Ben Hassen (TUN)
