= 2025 Open Internacional de San Sebastián – Doubles =

Doubles
- 2025 Open Internacional de San Sebastián

Final
- Champions: Anastasia Tikhonova (Croatia) Tara Würth
- Runners-up: (United States) Elvina Kalieva (Romania) Gabriela Lee
- Score: 6–3, 6–0

Events
| Singles | Doubles |
| ← 2022 · | Open Internacional de San Sebastián | · 2026 → |

Aliona Bolsova and Katarina Zavatska were the reigning champions from 2022, when the tournament was last held, but did not participate this year.

Anastasia Tikhonova and Tara Würth won the title, defeating Elvina Kalieva and Gabriela Lee 6–3, 6–0 in the final.

== Seeds ==
1. (Italy) Angelica Moratelli / (Latvia) Darja Semeņistaja (quarterfinals)
2. Anastasia Tikhonova / (Croatia) Tara Würth (champions)

== Draw ==
=== Key ===
- Q = Qualifier
- WC = Wild card
- LL = Lucky loser
- Alt = Alternate
- ITF = ITF entry
- PR = Protected ranking
- SR = Special ranking
- SE = Special exempt
- JE = Junior exempt
- JR = Junior Accelerator Programme entrant
- CO = College Accelerator Programme entrant
- NG = Next Gen Accelerator Program entrant
- w/o = Walkover
- r = Retired
- d = Defaulted

=== Draw ===
Quarterfinals
1 | (Italy) A Moratelli (Latvia) D Semeņistaja | 6^{5} | 6 | [6]
(Germany) T Morderger (Germany) Y Morderger | 7^{7} | 3 | [10]
WC | (France) N Berecoechea (Spain) O Bienzobas Fernández
(United States) E Kalieva (Romania) G Lee | w/o
(Switzerland) C Naef (Liechtenstein) K von Deichmann | 6^{2} | 5
(Venezuela) A Gámiz (Netherlands) E Vedder | 7^{7} | 7
(Spain) Á Fita Boluda (Netherlands) A Rus
2 | A Tikhonova (Croatia) T Würth | w/o

Semifinals
(Germany) T Morderger (Germany) Y Morderger | 1 | 1
(United States) E Kalieva (Romania) G Lee | 6 | 6
(Venezuela) A Gámiz (Netherlands) E Vedder | 5 | 4
2 | A Tikhonova (Croatia) T Würth | 7 | 6

Final
(United States) E Kalieva (Romania) G Lee | 3 | 0
2 | A Tikhonova (Croatia) T Würth | 6 | 6
