= Malta at the Mediterranean Games =

- IOC code: MLT
- NOC: Maltese Olympic Committee
- Medals Ranked 26th: Gold 1 Silver 4 Bronze 4 Total 9

Mediterranean Games appearances (overview)
- 1951; 1955; 1959; 1963; 1967; 1971; 1975; 1979; 1983; 1987; 1991; 1993; 1997; 2001; 2005; 2009; 2013; 2018; 2022; 2026

Malta appeared in every edition of the quadrennial Mediterranean Games event ever since its establishment in 1951.

== Overview ==
=== By event ===
Games	Athletes	Gold	Silver	Bronze	Total	Rank
1951 Alexandria	3	0	0	0	0	—
1955 Barcelona	4	0	0	0	0	—
1959 Beirut	2	0	0	0	0	—
1963 Naples	36	0	0	0	0	—
1967 Tunis		0	0	0	0	—
1971 İzmir	11	0	0	0	0	—
1975 Algiers	29	0	0	0	0	—
1979 Split	68	0	0	0	0	—
1983 Casablanca	31	0	0	0	0	—
1987 Latakia	8	0	0	0	0	—
1991 Athens	15	0	0	0	0	—
1993 Languedoc-Roussillon	10	0	0	1	1	17th
1997 Bari	15	0	1	1	2	15th
2001 Tunis	16	0	0	0	0	—
2005 Almería	29	0	0	1	1	19th
2009 Pescara	43	0	1	0	1	20th
2013 Mersin		1	1	0	2	16th
2018 Tarragona	11	0	0	1	1	24th
2022 Oran	31	0	1	0	1	23rd
2026 Taranto	40	0	0	0	0	—
Total		1	4	4	9	26th

== See also ==
- Malta at the Olympics
- Malta at the Paralympics
