= Malta at the 2005 Mediterranean Games =

- IOC code: MLT
- NOC: Malta Olympic Committee

in Almería
- Medals Ranked 19th: Gold 0 Silver 0 Bronze 1 Total 1

Mediterranean Games appearances (overview)
- 1951; 1955; 1959; 1963; 1967; 1971; 1975; 1979; 1983; 1987; 1991; 1993; 1997; 2001; 2005; 2009; 2013; 2018; 2022

Malta (MLT) competed at the 2005 Mediterranean Games in Almería, Spain. The island had a total number of 29 participants (26 men and 3 women).

== Medals ==
=== Bronze ===
Shooting

- Men's Double Trap: William Chetcuti

== Athletes ==
=== Athletics ===
- Carol Galea
- Jeandre Mallia
- Rashid Chouhal
- Mario Bonello
- Darren Gilford

=== Football ===
- Andrei Agius
- Edmund Agius
- Matthew Bartolo
- Steven Bezzina
- David Camenzuli
- Dyson Falzon
- Clayton Failla
- Paul Fenech
- Kenneth Spiteri
- Andrew Hogg
- Joseph Mifsud
- Alex Muscat
- Bernard Paris
- Jonathan Pearson
- Joel Sammut Vasquez
- Ryan Fenech
- Mark Gauci
- Andrew Scerri

=== Golf ===
- Andrew Borg

=== Judo ===
- Marcon Bezzina

=== Shooting ===
- William Chetcuti
- Emmanuel Grima

=== Swimming ===
- Angela Galea

=== Wrestling ===
- Abraham Vassallo

== See also ==
- Malta at the 2004 Summer Olympics
- Malta at the 2008 Summer Olympics
