= Adam Moundir =

Swiss–Moroccan tennis player

- Full name: Adam Ralph Khalifa Moundir
- Country (sports): Morocco (2019–current); Switzerland (2013–19)
- Born: 26 April 1995 (age 31) Saint-Louis, France
- Height: 1.91 m (6 ft 3 in)
- Plays: Right-handed (two-handed backhand)
- College: Old Dominion University
- Prize money: $61,158

Singles
- Career record: 2–3 (at ATP Tour level, Grand Slam level, and in Davis Cup)
- Career titles: 0
- Highest ranking: No. 437 (18 November 2019)

Doubles
- Career record: 0–1 (at ATP Tour level, Grand Slam level, and in Davis Cup)
- Career titles: 0
- Highest ranking: No. 390 (29 May 2023)

Team competitions
- Davis Cup: 6–2
Medal record
Representing Morocco
Men's Tennis
African Games
| Silver medal – second place | 2019 Rabat | Doubles |
| Bronze medal – third place | 2019 Rabat | Singles |
Mediterranean Games
| Bronze medal – third place | 2022 Oran | Singles |
| Bronze medal – third place | 2022 Oran | Doubles |

Adam Moundir (born 26 April 1995) is a Swiss–Moroccan tennis player. In June 2019, Moundir switched nationalities on the ITF and ATP to represent Morocco.

Moundir has a career high ATP singles ranking of No. 437 achieved on 18 November 2019 and a career high ATP doubles ranking of No. 390 which was achieved on 29 May 2023.

Moundir has represented Morocco at the Davis Cup.

== Future and Challenger finals ==
=== Singles: 5 (2–3) ===
| Legend (singles) ATP Challenger Tour (0–0) ITF Futures Tour (2–3) | Titles by surface Hard (0–3) Clay (2–0) Grass (0–0) Carpet (0–0) |

| Result | W–L | Date | Tournament | Tier | Surface | Opponent | Score |
|---|---|---|---|---|---|---|---|
| Loss | 0–1 | Nov 2018 | Egypt F27, Sharm El Sheikh | Futures | Hard | (Spain) David Pérez Sanz | 7–6^{(7–5)}, 3–6, 3–6 |
| Win | 1–1 | Sep 2019 | M25 Jounieh, Lebanon | World Tennis Tour | Clay | (France) Corentin Denolly | 6–4, 6–3 |
| Loss | 1–2 | Oct 2019 | M15 Sharm El Sheikh, Egypt | World Tennis Tour | Hard | (Czech Republic) Marek Gengel | 2–6, 3–6 |
| Loss | 1–3 | Oct 2019 | M15 Doha, Qatar | World Tennis Tour | Hard | (Ukraine) Marat Deviatiarov | 2–6, 3–6 |
| Win | 2–3 | Jul 2022 | M15 Metzingen, Germany | World Tennis Tour | Clay | (Hungary) Péter Fajta | 7–5, 3–6, 6–1 |

=== Doubles 14 (4–10) ===
| Legend (doubles) ATP Challenger Tour (0–0) ITF Futures Tour (4–10) | Titles by surface Hard (0–8) Clay (4–2) Grass (0–0) Carpet (0–0) |

| Result | W–L | Date | Tournament | Tier | Surface | Partner | Opponents | Score |
|---|---|---|---|---|---|---|---|---|
| Loss | 0–1 | Aug 2018 | Morocco F3, Tangier | Futures | Clay | (Morocco) Lamine Ouahab | (Argentina) Manuel Barros (Argentina) Tomás Lipovšek Puches | 3–6, 1–6 |
| Loss | 0–2 | Oct 2018 | Egypt F21, Sharm El Sheikh | Futures | Hard | (Poland) Kacper Żuk | (Italy) Marco Brugnerotto (Spain) David Pérez Sanz | 6–3, 2–6, [7–10] |
| Loss | 0–3 | Oct 2018 | Egypt F22, Sharm El Sheikh | Futures | Hard | (Germany) Kai Wehnelt | (Italy) Marco Brugnerotto (Spain) David Pérez Sanz | 5–7, 6–3, [6–10] |
| Loss | 0–4 | Oct 2018 | Egypt F23, Sharm El Sheikh | Futures | Hard | (Portugal) Francisco Dias | (Spain) David Pérez Sanz (Germany) Kai Wehnelt | 3–6, 3–6 |
| Loss | 0–5 | Nov 2018 | Egypt F27, Sharm El Sheikh | Futures | Hard | (Bahrain) Ali Dawani | (Venezuela) Jordi Muñoz Abreu (Spain) David Pérez Sanz | 2–6, 4–6 |
| Win | 1–5 | Jul 2019 | M15 Casablanca, Morocco | World Tennis Tour | Clay | (Morocco) Anas Fattar | (France) Pierre Delage (France) Nathan Seateun | 6–4, 6–1 |
| Win | 2–5 | Aug 2019 | M15 Agadir, Morocco | World Tennis Tour | Clay | (Morocco) Lamine Ouahab | (Argentina) Nicolás Alberto Arreche (Italy) Nicolò Turchetti | 2–6, 6–1, [10–6] |
| Loss | 2–6 | Oct 2019 | M15 Sharm El Sheikh, Egypt | World Tennis Tour | Hard | (Italy) Giorgio Ricca | (Czech Republic) Marek Gengel (Tunisia) Anis Ghorbel | 6–7^{(4–7)}, 3–6 |
| Loss | 2–7 | Oct 2019 | M15 Doha, Qatar | World Tennis Tour | Hard | (Slovakia) Marek Semjan | (Switzerland) Antoine Bellier (France) Quentin Folliot | 4–6, 6–2, [6–10] |
| Loss | 2–8 | Dec 2019 | M15 Doha, Qatar | World Tennis Tour | Hard | (Japan) Rio Noguchi | (Ukraine) Danylo Kalenichenko (Belarus) Ivan Liutarevich | 3–6, 6–7^{(3–7)} |
| Loss | 2–9 | Feb 2020 | M15 Monastir, Tunisia | World Tennis Tour | Hard | (Bosnia and Herzegovina) Aziz Kijametović | (Tunisia) Moez Echargui (Tunisia) Anis Ghorbel | 5–7, 4–6 |
| Loss | 2–10 | Feb 2022 | M15 Antalya, Turkey | World Tennis Tour | Clay | (Switzerland) Nicolás Parizzia | (Uruguay) Martín Cuevas (Spain) Àlex Martí Pujolràs | 6–3, 3–6, [4–10] |
| Win | 3–10 | May 2022 | M15 Brčko, Bosnia and Herzegovina | World Tennis Tour | Clay | (Ukraine) Vladyslav Orlov | (Ukraine) Oleksandr Bielinskyi (Ukraine) Viacheslav Bielinskyi | 5–7, 6–2, [12–10] |
| Win | 4–10 | Jul 2022 | M15 Casablanca, Morocco | World Tennis Tour | Clay | (Morocco) Younes Lalami Laaroussi | (Belgium) Simon Beaupain (Italy) Federico Iannaccone | 3–6, 6–3, [11–9] |

== Davis Cup ==
=== Participations: (6–2) ===
| Group membership World Group (0–0) WG Play-off (0–0) Group I (0–0) Group II (1–2) Group III (5–0) Group IV (0–0) | Matches by surface Hard (0–0) Clay (6–2) Grass (0–0) Carpet (0–0) | Matches by type Singles (4–2) Doubles (2–0) |

- ▲ ▼ indicates the outcome of the Davis Cup match followed by the score, date, place of event, the zonal classification and its phase, and the court surface.

| Rubber outcome | No. | Rubber | Match type (partner if any) | Opponent nation | Opponent player(s) | Score |
▼2–3; 5-6 April 2019; Royal Tennis Club de Marrakech, Marrakesh, Morocco; Europe/Africa Zone Group II First round; Clay surface
| Defeat | 1 | I | Singles | Lithuania | Ričardas Berankis | 2–6, 6–7^{(5–7)} |
▲4–0; 6-7 March 2020; Royal Tennis Club de Marrakech, Marrakesh, Morocco; World Group II Play-off First round; Clay surface
| Victory | 2 | II | Singles | Vietnam | Nguyễn Văn Phương | 6–1, 6–4 |
▼0–4; 4-5 March 2022; Monte Carlo Country Club, Roquebrune-Cap-Martin, France; World Group II Play-off; Clay surface
| Defeat | 3 | I | Singles | Monaco | Lucas Catarina | 3–6, 4–6 |
▲3–0; 10 August 2022; Tennis Club de Bachdjarah, Algiers, Algeria; Africa Zone Group III Pool B Round robin; Clay surface
| Victory | 4 | II | Singles | Algeria | Rayan Ghedjemis | 6–2, 3–6, 6–3 |
| Victory | 5 | III | Doubles (with Younes Lalami Laaroussi) (dead rubber) | Algeria | Samir Hamza Reguig / Toufik Sahtali | 6–4, 6–3 |
▲3–0; 11 August 2022; Tennis Club de Bachdjarah, Algiers, Algeria; Africa Zone Group III Pool B Round robin; Clay surface
| Victory | 6 | II | Singles | Kenya | Kael Shalin Shah | 6–0, 6–2 |
| Victory | 7 | III | Doubles (with Younes Lalami Laaroussi) (dead rubber) | Kenya | Derick Ominde / Keean Shah | 6–2, 6–2 |
▲3–0; 12 August 2022; Tennis Club de Bachdjarah, Algiers, Algeria; Africa Zone Group III Pool B Round robin; Clay surface
| Victory | 8 | II | Singles | Namibia | Codie Schalk van Schalkwyk | 6–1, 6–3 |
