= Malta at the 2013 Mediterranean Games =

- IOC code: MLT
- NOC: Malta Olympic Committee

in Mersin
- Medals Ranked th: Gold 1 Silver 1 Bronze 0 Total 2

Mediterranean Games appearances (overview)
- 1951; 1955; 1959; 1963; 1967; 1971; 1975; 1979; 1983; 1987; 1991; 1993; 1997; 2001; 2005; 2009; 2013; 2018; 2022

Malta competed at the 2013 Mediterranean Games in Mersin, Turkey from the 20th to 30 June 2013.

== Shooting ==
- Gold: Men Double Trap: William Chetcuti

== Bocce ==
- Silver: Men Bocce Doubles
