= Malta at the 1951 Mediterranean Games =

- IOC code: MLT
- NOC: Maltese Olympic Committee

in Alexandria, Egypt
- Competitors: 3
- Medals: Gold 0 Silver 0 Bronze 0 Total 0

Mediterranean Games appearances (overview)
- 1951; 1955; 1959; 1963; 1967; 1971; 1975; 1979; 1983; 1987; 1991; 1993; 1997; 2001; 2005; 2009; 2013; 2018; 2022

Malta competed at the 1951 Mediterranean Games in Alexandria, Egypt.
