= 2025 Open Internacional de San Sebastián =

Tennis tournament

- Date: 8–13 September 2025
- Edition: 2nd
- Category: WTA 125 tournaments
- Prize money: $115,000
- Surface: Clay / Outdoor
- Location: San Sebastián, Spain

Champions

Singles
- Oksana Selekhmeteva

Doubles
- Anastasia Tikhonova / (Croatia) Tara Würth
← 2022 ·	Open Internacional de San Sebastián	· 2026 →

The 2025 Open Internacional de San Sebastián was a professional tennis tournament played on outdoor clay courts. It was the second edition of the tournament (the first since 2022) and part of the 2025 WTA 125 tournaments (upgraded from ITF status in 2022). It took place in San Sebastián, Spain between 8 and 13 September 2025.

== Singles main draw entrants ==
=== Seeds ===
Country	Player	Rank^{1}	Seed
EGY	Mayar Sherif	102	1
CZE	Sára Bejlek	111	2
ROU	Anca Todoni	112	3
LAT	Darja Semeņistaja	115	4
AUT	Julia Grabher	116	5
ESP	Leyre Romero Gormaz	123	6
NED	Arantxa Rus	131	7
LIE	Kathinka von Deichmann	157	8

- ^{1} Rankings are as of 25 August 2025.

=== Other entrants ===
The following players received wildcards into the singles main draw:

- (Spain) Marina Bassols Ribera
- (Spain) Lucía Cortez Llorca
- (Spain) Charo Esquiva Bañuls
- (Spain) Ane Mintegi del Olmo

The following players received entry into the singles main draw using a protected ranking:

- (France) Alizé Cornet

The following players received entry from the qualifying draw:

- (France) Nahia Berecoechea
- (Canada) Carson Branstine
- (Germany) Tamara Korpatsch
- (Italy) Dalila Spiteri

The following player received entry as a lucky loser:

- (Australia) Tina Smith

=== Withdrawals ===
- (Spain) Andrea Lázaro García → replaced by (Australia) Tina Smith

== Doubles entrants ==
=== Seeds ===
Country	Player	Country	Player	Rank	Seed
ITA	Angelica Moratelli	LAT	Darja Semeņistaja	198	1
	Anastasia Tikhonova	CRO	Tara Würth	295	2

- Rankings as of 25 August 2025.

=== Other entrants ===
The following pair received a wildcard into the doubles main draw:

- (France) Nahia Berecoechea / (Spain) Olga Bienzobas Fernández

== Champions ==
=== Singles ===
- Oksana Selekhmeteva def. (Netherlands) Anouk Koevermans, 6–0, 6–4

=== Doubles ===
- Anastasia Tikhonova / (Croatia) Tara Würth def. (United States) Elvina Kalieva / (Romania) Gabriela Lee 6–3, 6–0
