= Malta at the 2018 Mediterranean Games =

- IOC code: MLT
- NOC: Malta Olympic Committee
- Competitors: 11 in 6 sports
- Flag bearer: Brian Galea
- Medals Ranked 24th: Gold 0 Silver 0 Bronze 1 Total 1

Mediterranean Games appearances (overview)
- 1951; 1955; 1959; 1963; 1967; 1971; 1975; 1979; 1983; 1987; 1991; 1993; 1997; 2001; 2005; 2009; 2013; 2018; 2022

Malta competed at the 2018 Mediterranean Games in Tarragona, Spain from 22 June to 1 July 2018.

== Medal summary ==
=== Medal table ===
Medal	Name	Sport	Event	Date
Bronze	Stefan Farrugia	Boules	Men's Raffa - Individual	30 June

== Athletics ==
Men
Track & road events

Athlete	Event	Final	
Athlete	Event	Result	Rank
Charlton Debono	Half marathon	1:12:21	14

Women
Track & road events

Athlete	Event	Final	
Athlete	Event	Result	Rank
Lisa Marie Bezzina	Half marathon	1:24:35	9

== Boules ==
Men

Athlete	Event	Group stage		Semifinal	Final / BM	
Athlete	Event	Pool Scores	Rank	Opposition Score	Opposition Score	Rank
Stefan Farrugia	Raffa − Individual	Belhouchet (ALG) W 10–7; Şimşek (TUR) W 12–6; Alswesi (LBA) W 12–6; Dall'Olmo (SMR) L 8–12; Nanni (ITA) L 10–12; Stjepčević (MNE) W 12–0; Rouault (FRA) W 12–8	3 Q	Dall'Olmo (SMR); L 7–9	Alswesi (LBA); W 8–7	3rd place, bronze medalist(s)

== Golf ==
Athlete	Event	Round 1	Round 2	Round 3	Round 4	Total		
Athlete	Event	Score	Score	Score	Score	Score	Par	Rank
Andrew Borg	Men's individual	77	70	71	76	294	+6	16
John Junior ver Elst Micallef	Men's individual	81	77	80	71	309	+21	32
Daniel Holland	Men's individual	80	76	77	80	313	+25	33
Andrew Borg; John Junior ver Elst Micallef; Daniel Holland	Men's team	77; ~~81~~; 80	70; ~~77~~; 76	71; ~~80~~; 77	76; 71; ~~80~~	598		10

== Shooting ==
Men

Athlete	Event	Qualification		Final	
Athlete	Event	Points	Rank	Points	Rank
William Chetcuti	Trap	114	22	Did not advance	
Brian Galea	Trap	114	23	Did not advance	

Women

Athlete	Event	Qualification		Final	
Athlete	Event	Points	Rank	Points	Rank
Eleanor Bezzina	10 m air pistol	560	7 Q	132.2	7

== Weightlifting ==
Women

Athlete	Event	Snatch		Clean & Jerk	
Athlete	Event	Result	Rank	Result	Rank
Yazmin Zammit Stevens	−69 kg	80	5	105	6

== Wrestling ==
Men's Freestyle

Athlete	Event	Round of 16	Quarterfinal	Semifinal	Repechage	Final / BM	
Athlete	Event	Opposition Result	Opposition Result	Opposition Result	Opposition Result	Opposition Result	Rank
David Galea	−74 kg	Chamizo (ITA); L 0–10	Did not advance		Binenmpaoum (GRE); W WO	Demir (TUR); L 0–10	5
