= 2022 Davis Cup Africa Zone Group III =

Davis Cup competition in 2022

The Africa Zone was the unique zone within Group 3 of the regional Davis Cup competition in 2022. The zone's competition was held in round robin format in Algiers, Algeria, from 10 to 13 August 2022.

== Participating nations ==
- Algeria
- Benin
- Ivory Coast
- Kenya
- Morocco
- Mozambique
- Namibia
- Zimbabwe

== Draw ==
Date: 10–13 August 2022

Location: Tennis Club de Bachdjarah, Algiers, Algeria (clay)

Format: Round-robin basis. Two pools of two teams. Two pools of four teams and nations will play each team once in their group. The two group winners will automatically earn promotion to the World Group II play-offs in 2022. The two second-placed teams will fight for the third remaining promotion spot. The four teams finishing in third and last place will fight to avoid relegation to Africa Group IV.

=== Seeding ===
Pot	Nation	Rank^{1}	Seed
1	Zimbabwe	67	1
1	Morocco	67	1
2	Benin	75	3
2	Kenya	77	4
3	Namibia	82	5
3	Mozambique	90	6
4	Algeria	91	7
4	Ivory Coast	105	8

- ^{1}Davis Cup Rankings as of 7 March 2022

=== Round Robin ===
==== Pool A ====
		CIV	ZIM	BEN	MOZ	RR; W–L	Set; W–L	Game; W–L	Standings
8	Ivory Coast		2–1	2–1	3–0	3–0	14–5 (74%)	105–70 (60%)	1
1	Zimbabwe	1–2		2–1	3–0	2–1	12–6 (67%)	97–59 (62%)	2
3	Benin	1–2	1–2		3–0	1–2	11–8 (58%)	95–75 (56%)	3
6	Mozambique	0–3	0–3	0–3		0–3	0–18 (0%)	15–108 (12%)	4

==== Pool B ====
		MAR	NAM	ALG	KEN	RR; W–L	Set; W–L	Game; W–L	Standings
1	Morocco		3–0	3–0	3–0	3–0	18–1 (95%)	113–53 (68%)	1
5	Namibia	0–3		2–1	2–1	2–1	9–12 (43%)	98–98 (50%)	2
7	Algeria	0–3	1–2		2–1	1–2	9–14 (39%)	93–116 (44%)	3
4	Kenya	0–3	1–2	1–2		0–3	5–14 (26%)	63–100 (39%)	4

Standings are determined by: 1. number of wins; 2. number of matches; 3. in two-team ties, head-to-head records; 4. in three-team ties, (a) percentage of sets won (head-to-head records if two teams remain tied), then (b) percentage of games won (head-to-head records if two teams remain tied), then (c) Davis Cup rankings.

=== Playoffs ===
Placing	A Team	Score	B Team
1st–2nd	Ivory Coast	0–2	Morocco
Promotion	Zimbabwe	2–1	Namibia
Relegation	Benin	2–1	Kenya
Relegation	Mozambique	0–2	Algeria

- Ivory Coast, Morocco and Zimbabwe qualify for the 2023 Davis Cup World Group II Play-offs
- Kenya and Mozambique are relegated to 2023 Davis Cup Africa Zone Group IV

== Round Robin ==
=== Pool A ===
==== Zimbabwe vs. Ivory Coast ====
Zimbabwe
1
Tennis Club de Bachdjarah, Algiers, Algeria
10 August 2022
Clay

Ivory Coast
2

			1	2	3
1	(Zimbabwe) (Ivory Coast)	Courtney John Lock; Abdoulaziz Bationo	3; 6	4; 6
2	(Zimbabwe) (Ivory Coast)	Benjamin Lock; Eliakim Coulibaly	6; 1	6; 4
3	(Zimbabwe) (Ivory Coast)	Benjamin Lock / Courtney John Lock; Abdoulaziz Bationo / Eliakim Coulibaly	4; 6	6^{2} 7^{7}

==== Benin vs. Mozambique ====
Benin
3
Tennis Club de Bachdjarah, Algiers, Algeria
10 August 2022
Clay

Mozambique
0

			1	2	3
1	(Benin) (Mozambique)	Patrick Agbo-Panzo; Jaime Sigauque	6; 0	6; 0
2	(Benin) (Mozambique)	Sylvestre Monnou; Armando Sigauque	6; 0	6; 1
3	(Benin) (Mozambique)	Alexis Klégou / Sylvestre Monnou; Jossefa Simão Elias / Jaime Sigauque	6; 1	6; 2

==== Zimbabwe vs. Benin ====
Zimbabwe
2
Tennis Club de Bachdjarah, Algiers, Algeria
11 August 2022
Clay

Benin
1

			1	2	3
1	(Zimbabwe) (Benin)	Mehluli Don Ayanda Sibanda; Sylvestre Monnou	3; 6	4; 6
2	(Zimbabwe) (Benin)	Benjamin Lock; Alexis Klégou	6; 2	7^{8} 6^{6}
3	(Zimbabwe) (Benin)	Benjamin Lock / Courtney John Lock; Alexis Klégou / Sylvestre Monnou	6; 4	6; 3

==== Mozambique vs. Ivory Coast ====
Mozambique
0
Tennis Club de Bachdjarah, Algiers, Algeria
11 August 2022
Clay

Ivory Coast
3

			1	2	3
1	(Mozambique) (Ivory Coast)	Jaime Sigauque; Abdoulaziz Bationo	1; 6	2; 6
2	(Mozambique) (Ivory Coast)	Jossefa Simão Elias; Eliakim Coulibaly	0; 6	0; 6
3	(Mozambique) (Ivory Coast)	Jossefa Simão Elias / Jaime Sigauque; Frédéric Coulibaly / Gueninle Abdoul Karim Ouattara	3; 6	3; 6

==== Zimbabwe vs. Mozambique ====
Zimbabwe
3
Tennis Club de Bachdjarah, Algiers, Algeria
12 August 2022
Clay

Mozambique
0

			1	2	3
1	(Zimbabwe) (Mozambique)	Mehluli Don Ayanda Sibanda; Jaime Sigauque	6; 1	6; 0
2	(Zimbabwe) (Mozambique)	Benjamin Lock; Jossefa Simão Elias	6; 1	6; 0
3	(Zimbabwe) (Mozambique)	Benjamin Lock / Courtney John Lock; Hercilio Rafael Seda / Jaime Sigauque	6; 0	6; 0

==== Benin vs. Ivory Coast ====
Benin
1
Tennis Club de Bachdjarah, Algiers, Algeria
12 August 2022
Clay

Ivory Coast
2

			1	2	3
1	(Benin) (Ivory Coast)	Sylvestre Monnou; Abdoulaziz Bationo	4; 6	6; 4	2; 6
2	(Benin) (Ivory Coast)	Alexis Klégou; Eliakim Coulibaly	2; 6	5; 7
3	(Benin) (Ivory Coast)	Patrick Agbo-Panzo / Alexis Klégou; Frédéric Coulibaly / Gueninle Abdoul Karim Ouattara	7^{13} 6^{11}	6; 4

=== Pool B ===
==== Morocco vs. Algeria ====
Morocco
3
Tennis Club de Bachdjarah, Algiers, Algeria
10 August 2022
Clay

Algeria
0

			1	2	3
1	(Morocco) (Algeria)	Yassine Dlimi; Toufik Sahtali	6; 2	6; 4
2	(Morocco) (Algeria)	Adam Moundir; Rayan Ghedjemis	6; 2	3; 6	6; 3
3	(Morocco) (Algeria)	Younes Lalami Laaroussi / Adam Moundir; Samir Hamza Reguig / Toufik Sahtali	6; 4	6; 3

==== Kenya vs. Namibia ====
Kenya
1
Tennis Club de Bachdjarah, Algiers, Algeria
10 August 2022
Clay

Namibia
2

			1	2	3
1	(Kenya) (Namibia)	Albert Njogu; Connor Henry van Schalkwyk	1; 6	1; 6
2	(Kenya) (Namibia)	Kael Shalin Shah; Codie Schalk van Schalkwyk	7; 5	6; 3
3	(Kenya) (Namibia)	Derick Ominde / Keean Shah; Codie Schalk van Schalkwyk / Connor Henry van Schalkwyk	5; 7	2; 6

==== Morocco vs. Kenya ====
Morocco
3
Tennis Club de Bachdjarah, Algiers, Algeria
11 August 2022
Clay

Kenya
0

			1	2	3
1	(Morocco) (Kenya)	Yassine Dlimi; Albert Njogu	6; 1	6; 2
2	(Morocco) (Kenya)	Adam Moundir; Kael Shalin Shah	6; 0	6; 2
3	(Morocco) (Kenya)	Younes Lalami Laaroussi / Adam Moundir; Derick Ominde / Keean Shah	6; 2	6; 2

==== Namibia vs. Algeria ====
Namibia
2
Tennis Club de Bachdjarah, Algiers, Algeria
11 August 2022
Clay

Algeria
1

			1	2	3
1	(Namibia) (Algeria)	Connor Henry van Schalkwyk; Toufik Sahtali	6; 2	6^{4} 7^{7}	6; 4
2	(Namibia) (Algeria)	Codie Schalk van Schalkwyk; Rayan Ghedjemis	3; 6	6; 1	3; 6
3	(Namibia) (Algeria)	Codie Schalk van Schalkwyk / Connor Henry van Schalkwyk; Rayan Ghedjemis / Samir Hamza Reguig	6; 3	3; 6	6; 3

==== Morocco vs. Namibia ====
Morocco
3
Tennis Club de Bachdjarah, Algiers, Algeria
12 August 2022
Clay

Namibia
0

			1	2	3
1	(Morocco) (Namibia)	Yassine Dlimi; Connor Henry van Schalkwyk	7; 5	6; 2
2	(Morocco) (Namibia)	Adam Moundir; Codie Schalk van Schalkwyk	6; 1	6; 3
3	(Morocco) (Namibia)	Walid Ahouda / Mehdi Benchakroun; Steyn Dippenaar / Codie Schalk van Schalkwyk	7^{8} 6^{6}	6; 3

==== Kenya vs. Algeria ====
Kenya
1
Tennis Club de Bachdjarah, Algiers, Algeria
12 August 2022
Clay

Algeria
2

			1	2	3
1	(Kenya) (Algeria)	Albert Njogu; Samir Hazma Reguig	1; 6	3; 6
2	(Kenya) (Algeria)	Kael Shalin Shah; Rayan Ghedjemis	7^{7} 6^{4}	4; 6	5; 7
3	(Kenya) (Algeria)	Derick Ominde / Keean Shah; Mohamed Amine Aïssa Khelifa / Toufik Sahtali				w/o

== Play-offs ==
=== 1st place play-off ===
==== Ivory Coast vs. Morocco ====
Ivory Coast
0
Tennis Club de Bachdjarah, Algiers, Algeria
13 August 2022
Clay

Morocco
2

			1	2	3
1	(Ivory Coast) (Morocco)	Gueninle Abdoul Karim Ouattara; Walid Ahouda	3; 6	6; 4	4; 6
2	(Ivory Coast) (Morocco)	Abdoulaziz Bationo; Mehdi Benchakroun	2; 6	3; 6
3	(Ivory Coast) (Morocco)	Abdoulaziz Bationo / Gueninle Abdoul Karim Ouattara; Yassine Dlimi / Younes Lalami Laaroussi				not played

=== Promotion play-off ===
==== Namibia vs. Zimbabwe ====
Namibia
1
Tennis Club de Bachdjarah, Algiers, Algeria
13 August 2022
Clay

Zimbabwe
2

			1	2	3
1	(Namibia) (Zimbabwe)	Connor Henry van Schalkwyk; Mehluli Don Ayanda Sibanda	6; 3	6; 4
2	(Namibia) (Zimbabwe)	Codie Schalk van Schalkwyk; Benjamin Lock	3; 6	6; 4	6^{2} 7^{7}
3	(Namibia) (Zimbabwe)	Codie Schalk van Schalkwyk / Connor Henry van Schalkwyk; Benjamin Lock / Courtney John Lock	0; 6	1; 6

=== Relegation play-offs ===
==== Benin vs. Kenya ====
Benin
2
Tennis Club de Bachdjarah, Algiers, Algeria
13 August 2022
Clay

Kenya
1

			1	2	3
1	(Benin) (Kenya)	Patrick Agbo-Panzo; Keean Shah	6; 0	6; 3
2	(Benin) (Kenya)	Alexis Klégou; Kael Shalin Shah	6; 1	6; 1
3	(Benin) (Kenya)	Patrick Agbo-Panzo / Sylvestre Monnou; Albert Njogu / Derick Ominde	6^{2} 7^{7}	5; 7

==== Algeria vs. Mozambique ====
Algeria
2
Tennis Club de Bachdjarah, Algiers, Algeria
13 August 2022
Clay

Mozambique
0

			1	2	3
1	(Algeria) (Mozambique)	Toufik Sahtali; Jossefa Simão Elias	6; 0	6; 1
2	(Algeria) (Mozambique)	Samir Hamza Reguig; Hercilio Rafael Seda	6; 0	6; 0
3	(Algeria) (Mozambique)	Mohamed Amine Aïssa Khelifa / Rayan Ghedjemis; Jossefa Simão Elias / Jaime Sigauque				not played
