= Open Internacional de San Sebastián =

WTA 125
- Event name: Open Internacional de San Sebastián
- Location: San Sebastián, Spain
- Venue: Real Club Tenis de San Sebastián
- Category: WTA 125
- Surface: Clay / Outdoor
- Draw: 32S/16Q/8D
- Prize money: $115,000
- Website: https://openinternacionalsansebastian.com

Current champions (2025)
- Singles: Oksana Selekhmeteva
- Doubles: Anastasia Tikhonova (Croatia) Tara Würth

The Open Internacional de San Sebastián is a professional women's tennis tournament played on outdoor clay courts in San Sebastián, Spain. The event was originally part of the ITF Women's World Tennis Tour, classified as a $60,000 ITF tournament and first held in 2022.

In 2025, the tournament returned as a WTA 125 event, becoming the first WTA tournament ever held in the Basque Country.

== Past finals ==
=== Singles ===
Year	Champion	Runner-up	Score
2022	(Austria) Julia Grabher	(Spain) Aliona Bolsova	6–3, 7–6^{(7–3)}
2023 - 2024	Not Held		
↓ WTA 125 event ↓
2025	Oksana Selekhmeteva	(Netherlands) Anouk Koevermans	6–0, 6–4
2026	not held		

=== Doubles ===
Year	Champions	Runners-up	Score
2022	(Spain) Aliona Bolsova (Ukraine) Katarina Zavatska	(Spain) Ángela Fita Boluda (Spain) Guiomar Maristany	1–2 ret.
2023 - 2024	Not Held		
↓ WTA 125 event ↓
2025	Anastasia Tikhonova (Croatia) Tara Würth	(United States) Elvina Kalieva (Romania) Gabriela Lee	6–3, 6–0
2026	not held		
