= Jéssica Bouzas Maneiro =

Spanish tennis player (born 2002)

Jéssica Bouzas
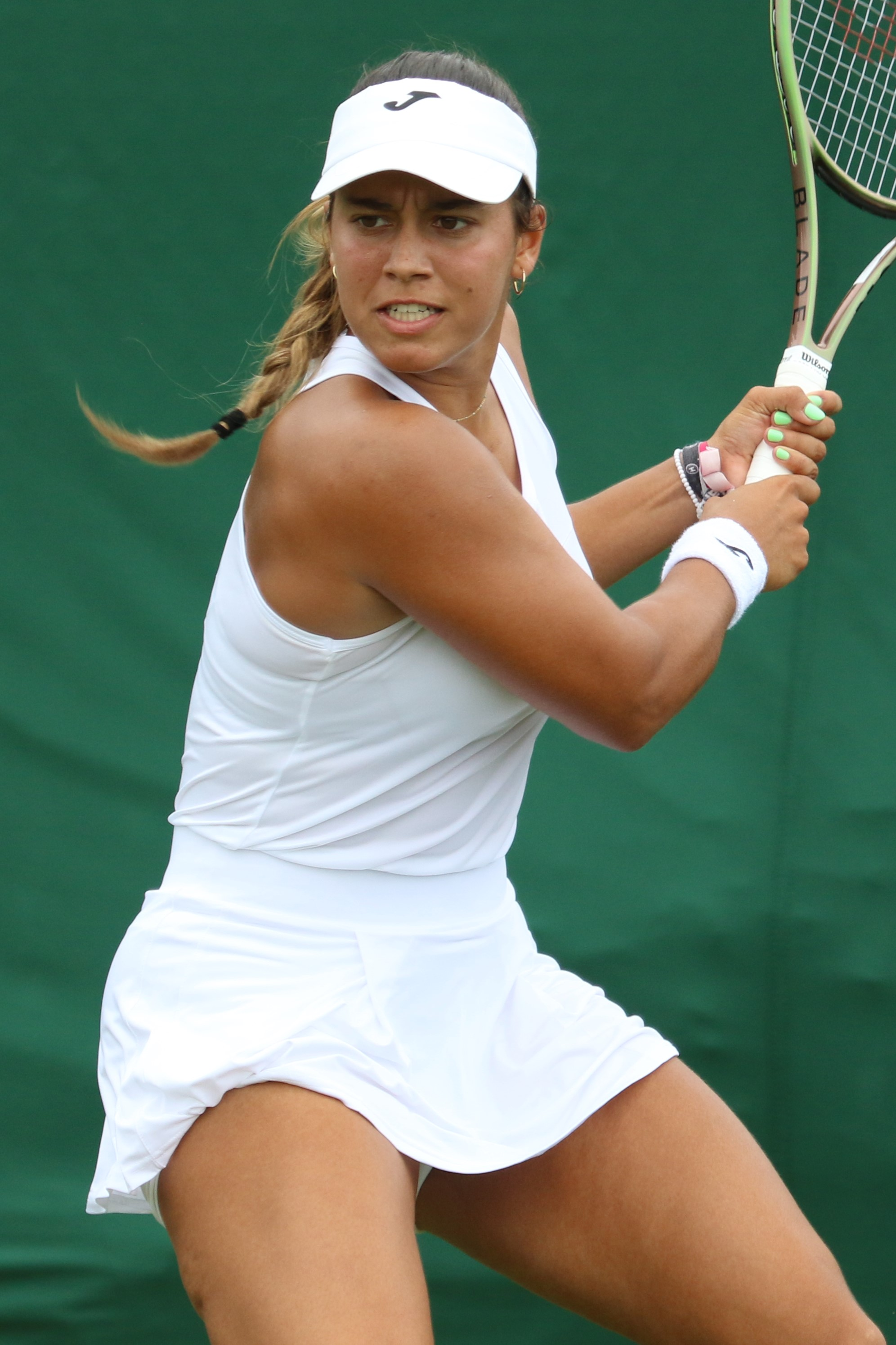
- Bouzas at the 2023 Wimbledon Championships
- Full name: Jéssica Bouzas Maneiro
- Country (sports): Spain
- Born: 24 September 2002 (age 24) Vilagarcía de Arousa, Galicia
- Height: 1.70 m (5 ft 7 in)
- Plays: Right-handed (two-handed backhand)
- Coach: Roberto Ortega Olmedo
- Prize money: $3,342,136

Singles
- Career record: 275–162
- Career titles: 1 WTA 125
- Highest ranking: No. 40 (18 August 2025)
- Current ranking: No. 99 (12 October 2026)

Grand Slam singles results
- Australian Open: 2R (2025)
- French Open: 3R (2025)
- Wimbledon: 4R (2025)
- US Open: 3R (2024)

Doubles
- Career record: 41–46
- Career titles: 0 WTA, 4 ITF
- Highest ranking: No. 201 (9 January 2023)
- Current ranking: No. 1,118 (12 October 2026)

Grand Slam doubles results
- Australian Open: 1R (2025, 2026)
- French Open: 1R (2025, 2026)
- Wimbledon: 1R (2025, 2026)
- US Open: 1R (2025)

Team competitions
- BJK Cup: 3–2
Medal record
Women's tennis
Representing Spain
Mediterranean Games
Bronze medal – third place	2022 Oran	Singles
Gold medal – first place	2022 Oran	Doubles
- Last updated on: 14 October 2026.

Jéssica Bouzas Maneiro (born 24 September 2002) is a Spanish professional tennis player. She has a career-high WTA singles ranking of No. 40, achieved on 18 August 2025, and a best in doubles of No. 201, attained on 9 January 2023. She is the current No. 2 Spanish WTA player.

Bouzas Maneiro has won one singles title on the WTA Challenger Tour as well as eleven singles titles and four doubles titles on the ITF World Tennis Tour.

== Early life ==
Jéssica Bouzas Maneiro was born in Vilagarcía de Arousa to father Juan Jesús and mother Gloria. She began playing tennis at the age of five at the Club de Tenis O Rial in her hometown. At the age of 13, she moved to Alicante to train at the Ferrero Tennis Academy. In 2022, she moved to Madrid to train under Javier Martí, the former coach of Paula Badosa. In September 2023, she hired Roberto Ortega Olmedo as her coach.

== Career ==
=== 2020–2021: ITF Circuit titles ===
In December 2020, Bouzas Maneiro reached her first professional singles final at the 15k Torneo Internacional de Tenis Ciudad Raqueta in Madrid, but was defeated by Conny Perrin. The following month, in January 2021, she won her maiden singles title at a 15k event in Cairo, defeating Chantal Škamlová in the final. In March 2021, she reached the final of the 15k Internationaux de Tennis Féminin in Gonesse, but lost to Marine Partaud. At the 15k Open du Havre, she reached the quarterfinals, eventually losing to Léolia Jeanjean. In June 2021, she won another title at a 15k event in Heraklion and reached the final of the 25k Ciudad Raqueta event in Madrid.

=== 2022–2023: Major and United Cup debuts ===
In February 2022, she won the 15k event in Villena, defeating Ashley Lahey in the final. A month later, she won her second title of the year at the 15k Vilas Academy Calvià Open in Palma Nova. In May, she reached the final of the 25k event in Platja d'Aro, but lost to compatriot Guiomar Maristany. At the end of June, she won the bronze medal in singles and a gold medal in doubles at the Mediterranean Games. Partnering Maristany, they defeated the Maltese pair of Francesca Curmi and Elaine Genovese to clinch the medal.

In 2023, she competed for Spain as a substitute at the United Cup, and was victorious on her debut over Olivia Gadecki. She made her major debut at the Wimbledon Championships by qualifying for the main draw.

=== 2024: WTA 125 title and top 10 win, two major third rounds ===
In March, she won her maiden WTA 125 title at the Antalya Challenger. The following month, she reached the final of the Zaragoza Open, but lost to Moyuka Uchijima. She subsequently made her WTA top 100 debut on 15 April 2024, reaching a new career-high ranking of world No. 90. She made her WTA 1000 main-draw debut, after qualifying for the Madrid Open where she defeated compatriot Paula Badosa in the first round for her first win at this level.

At Wimbledon, Bouzas stood in the third round of a major for the first time in her career, after upsetting defending champion Markéta Vondroušová in straight sets, her first top 10 win, and defeating compatriot Cristina Bucșa. Her victory over Vondroušová marked the first time since 1994 that the defending women's Wimbledon champion was eliminated in the first round. She exited the tournament, after retiring due to a back injury while trailing in her round three match against eventual champion Barbora Krejčíková.

She also made her debut at the Cincinnati Open when she defeated fellow lucky loser Lucia Bronzetti before losing to Elina Svitolina.

Bouzas reached another major third round at the US Open with wins over Petra Martić and 31st seed Katie Boulter. Her run was ended by sixth seed Jessica Pegula.

Wins over qualifier Jana Fett and wildcard Shi Han saw her make it through to the quarterfinals at the Guangzhou Open, where she lost to qualifier Caroline Dolehide.

=== 2025: Wimbledon fourth round, first WTA 1000 quarterfinal ===
At the Australian Open, Bouzas defeated Sonay Kartal to set up a second round meeting with world No. 1 Aryna Sabalenka which she lost in straight sets.

In April at the Rouen Open, she overcame Maria Sakkari, and Varvara Gracheva, before losing in the quarterfinals to top seed and eventual champion, Elina Svitolina.

The following month, Bouzas made it through to the quarterfinals at the Morocco Open in Rabat with wins over Julia Grabher and qualifier Sada Nahimana. She lost in the last eight to Ajla Tomljanović.

At the French Open, she defeated ninth seed Emma Navarro and Robin Montgomery to reach the third round, in which she lost to Hailey Baptiste.

Bouzas made it into the fourth round at Wimbledon for the first time thanks to the retirement due to injury of her opening opponent, Ella Seidel, followed by wins over 28th seed Sofia Kenin and Dayana Yastremska. Her run was ended by 19th seed Liudmila Samsonova.

Moving onto the North American hardcourt swing of the season at the Canadian Open, she defeated qualifier Louisa Chirico, 26th seed Ashlyn Krueger, qualifier Aoi Ito, and Zhu Lin to reach her first WTA 1000 quarterfinal, at which point she lost to wildcard entrant and eventual champion, Victoria Mboko.

Ranked at a new career-high of world No. 42, Bouzas made it through to the fourth round at the Cincinnati Open with wins over wildcard entrant Venus Williams, 21st seed Leylah Fernandez, and wildcard entrant Taylor Townsend. She lost to world No. 1, Aryna Sabalenka.

=== 2026: Two WTA 250 quarterfinals ===
Seeded second at the Morocco Open, Bouzas defeated qualifiers Lisa Zaar and Fiona Ferro to reach the quarterfinals, at which point her run was ended by sixth seed Petra Marčinko. The following month at the Nottingham Open, she overcame qualifier Himeno Sakatsume and Katie Volynets to make it through to the quarterfinals, where she lost to third seed Emma Navarro.

== Performance timeline ==
Key
W	F	SF	QF	#R	RR	Q#	P#	DNQ	A	Z#	PO	G	S	B	NMS	NTI	P	NH

(W) winner; (F) finalist; (SF) semifinalist; (QF) quarterfinalist; (#R) rounds 4, 3, 2, 1; (RR) round-robin stage; (Q#) qualification round; (P#) preliminary round; (DNQ) did not qualify; (A) absent; (Z#) Davis/Fed Cup Zonal Group (with number indication) or (PO) play-off; (G) gold, (S) silver or (B) bronze Olympic/Paralympic medal; (NMS) not a Masters tournament; (NTI) not a Tier I tournament; (P) postponed; (NH) not held; (SR) strike rate (events won / competed); (W–L) win–loss record.
To avoid confusion and double counting, these charts are updated at the conclusion of a tournament or when the player's participation has ended.

Only main-draw results in WTA Tour, Grand Slam tournaments, Billie Jean King Cup, Hopman Cup, United Cup and Olympic Games are included in win–loss records.

=== Singles ===
Current through the 2026 US Open.

Tournament	2021	2022	2023	2024	2025	2026	SR	W–L	Win%
Grand Slam tournaments
Australian Open	A	A	Q3	Q1	2R	1R	0 / 2	1–2	33%
French Open	A	A	Q1	1R	3R	1R	0 / 3	2–3	40%
Wimbledon	A	A	1R	3R	4R	3R	0 / 4	7–4	64%
US Open	A	A	Q1	3R	1R	2R	0 / 3	3–3	50%
Win–Loss	0–0	0–0	0–1	4–3	6–4	3–4	0 / 12	13–12	52%
WTA 1000 tournaments
Qatar Open	NTI	A	NTI	A	A	1R	0 / 1	0–1	0%
Dubai Championships	A	NTI	A	A	A	1R	0 / 1	0–1	0%
Indian Wells Open	A	A	A	A	1R	2R	0 / 2	1–2	33%
Miami Open	A	A	A	Q1	1R	1R	0 / 2	0–2	0%
Madrid Open	Q1	Q1	Q1	2R	2R	2R	0 / 3	3–3	50%
Italian Open	A	A	A	Q1	2R	1R	0 / 2	1–2	33%
Canadian Open	A	A	A	A	QF	2R	0 / 2	5–2	71%
Cincinnati Open	A	A	A	2R	4R	2R	0 / 3	5–3	63%
China Open	NH		A	1R	3R	A	0 / 2	2–2	50%
Wuhan Open	NH			A	2R	A	0 / 1	1–1	50%
Win–Loss	0–0	0–0	0–0	2–3	12–8	4–8	0 / 19	18–19	49%

== WTA 125 finals ==
=== Singles: 2 (1 title, 1 runner-up) ===
Result	W–L	Date	Tournament	Surface	Opponent	Score
Win	1–0	Mar 2024	Antalya Challenger, Turkiye	Clay	(Romania) Irina-Camelia Begu	6–2, 4–6, 6–2
Loss	1–1	Sep 2026	Jingshan Open, China	Hard	Alexandra Shubladze	3–6, 2–6

== ITF Circuit finals ==
=== Singles: 19 (11 titles, 8 runner-ups) ===
Legend W100 tournaments (0–2) W60/75 tournaments (2–1) W50 tournaments (1–1) W25 tournaments (3–2) W15 tournaments (5–2)	Finals by surface Hard (5–1) Clay (6–7)

Result	W–L	Date	Tournament	Tier	Surface	Opponent	Score
Loss	0–1	Dec 2020	ITF Madrid, Spain	W15	Clay	(Switzerland) Conny Perrin	4–6, 6–7^{(8)}
Win	1–1	Jan 2021	ITF Cairo, Egypt	W15	Clay	(Slovakia) Chantal Škamlová	7–5, 4–6, 6–4
Win	2–1	Jan 2021	ITF Cairo, Egypt	W15	Clay	(United States) Anastasia Nefedova	6–0, 6–0
Loss	2–2	Mar 2021	ITF Gonesse, France	W15	Clay (i)	(France) Marine Partaud	4–6, 3–6
Win	3–2	Jun 2021	ITF Heraklion, Greece	W15	Clay	(Mexico) María Portillo Ramírez	6–3, 6–0
Loss	3–3	Jun 2021	ITF Madrid, Spain	W25	Clay	(France) Amandine Hesse	4–6, 5–7
Win	4–3	Feb 2022	ITF Villena, Spain	W15	Hard	(United States) Ashley Lahey	6–2, 6–1
Win	5–3	Mar 2022	ITF Palmanova, Spain	W15	Hard	(Spain) Yvonne Cavallé Reimers	6–4, 6–1
Loss	5–4	May 2022	ITF Platja d'Aro, Spain	W25	Clay	(Spain) Guiomar Maristany	6–7^{(2)}, 4–6
Win	6–4	Jul 2022	ITF Aschaffenburg, Germany	W25	Clay	(Germany) Katharina Hobgarski	6–1, 6–2
Win	7–4	Oct 2022	ITF Šibenik, Croatia	W25	Clay	(Spain) Leyre Romero Gormaz	6–3, 6–3
Win	8–4	Oct 2022	ITF Quinta do Lago, Portugal	W25	Hard	(Croatia) Tara Würth	7–5, 5–4 ret.
Loss	8–5	May 2023	Prague Open, Czech Republic	W60	Clay	(Latvia) Darja Semenistaja	6–2, 3–6, 4–6
Win	9–5	Jul 2023	ATV Roma, Italy	W60	Clay	(Cyprus) Raluca Șerban	6–2, 6–4
Loss	9–6	Aug 2023	ITF Gran Canaria, Spain	W100	Clay	(Austria) Julia Grabher	4–6, 4–6
Win	10–6	Jan 2024	Porto Indoor, Portugal	W75+H	Hard (i)	(Poland) Maja Chwalińska	3–6, 6–0, 6–4
Loss	10–7	Jan 2024	Porto Indoor 2, Portugal	W50	Hard (i)	(Slovakia) Rebecca Šramková	7–6^{(4)}, 5–7, 1–6
Win	11–7	Feb 2024	ITF Morelia, Mexico	W50	Hard	(United States) Hailey Baptiste	6–7^{(11)}, 6–1, 7–6^{(1)}
Loss	11–8	Apr 2024	Zaragoza Open, Spain	W100	Clay	(Japan) Moyuka Uchijima	1–6, 2–6

=== Doubles: 6 (4 titles, 2 runner-ups) ===
Legend W60 tournaments (1–0) W25 tournaments (3–1) W15 tournaments (0–1)	Finals by surface Clay (4–2)

Result	W–L	Date	Tournament	Tier	Surface	Partner	Opponents	Score
Loss	0–1	Feb 2021	ITF Antalya, Turkiye	W15	Clay	(Netherlands) Lexie Stevens	(Croatia) Mariana Dražić (Romania) Oana Georgeta Simion	6–4, 3–6, [10–12]
Win	1–1	Apr 2022	ITF Oeiras, Portugal	W25	Clay	(Spain) Guiomar Maristany	(Portugal) Francisca Jorge (Portugal) Matilde Jorge	3–6, 6–4, [10–8]
Win	2–1	Jul 2022	ITF Getxo, Spain	W25	Clay	(Spain) Leyre Romero Gormaz	(South Korea) Park So-hyun (Greece) Sapfo Sakellaridi	7–5, 6–0
Loss	2–2	Jul 2022	ITF Darmstadt, Germany	W25	Clay	(Spain) Leyre Romero Gormaz	(Estonia) Elena Malõgina (France) Alice Robbe	5–7, 5–7
Win	3–2	Aug 2022	ITF San Bartolomé, Spain	W60	Clay	(Spain) Leyre Romero Gormaz	(Spain) Lucía Cortez Llorca (Spain) Rosa Vicens Mas	1–6, 7–5, [10–6]
Win	4–2	Sep 2022	ITF Marbella, Spain	W25	Clay	(Spain) Leyre Romero Gormaz	(Argentina) Julia Riera (Chile) Daniela Seguel	6–4, 6–2

== National representation ==
=== Multi-sports event ===
Bouzas Maneiro made her debut representing Spain in multi-sports event at the 2022 Mediterranean Games.

==== Singles: 1 (bronze medal) ====
Result	Date	Tournament	Surface	Opponent	Score
Bronze	June 2022	Mediterranean Games, Oran, Algeria	Clay	(Tunisia) Chiraz Bechri	w/o

==== Doubles: 1 (gold medal) ====
Result	Date	Tournament	Surface	Partner	Opponents	Score
Gold	June 2022	Mediterranean Games, Oran	Clay	(Spain) Guiomar Maristany	(Malta) Francesca Curmi (Malta) Elaine Genovese	6–3, 6–2

== Wins against top 10 players ==
- Bouzas Maneiro has a 3–6 record against players who were, at the time the match was played, ranked in the top 10.

No.	Player	Rk	Event	Surface	Rd	Score	Rk	Years	Ref
1.	(Czech Republic) Markéta Vondroušová	6	Wimbledon, UK	Grass	1R	6–4, 6–2	83	2024	
2.	(United States) Emma Navarro	9	French Open, France	Clay	1R	6–0, 6–1	68	2025	
3.	(United States) Coco Gauff	4	United Cup, Australia	Hard	RR	6–1, 6–7^{(3–7)}, 6–0	42	2026	

- Key: (Rk) first use, opponent rank; (Rd) round; (Rk) 2nd use, player rank; (Ref) reference; (F) final; (SF) semifinal; (QF) quarterfinal; (#R) rounds 4, 3, 2, 1; (RR) round-robin stage; (Q#) qualifying rounds or stages (3), 2, 1.

*As of 5 January 2026
