= Anouk Koevermans =

Dutch tennis player (born 2004)

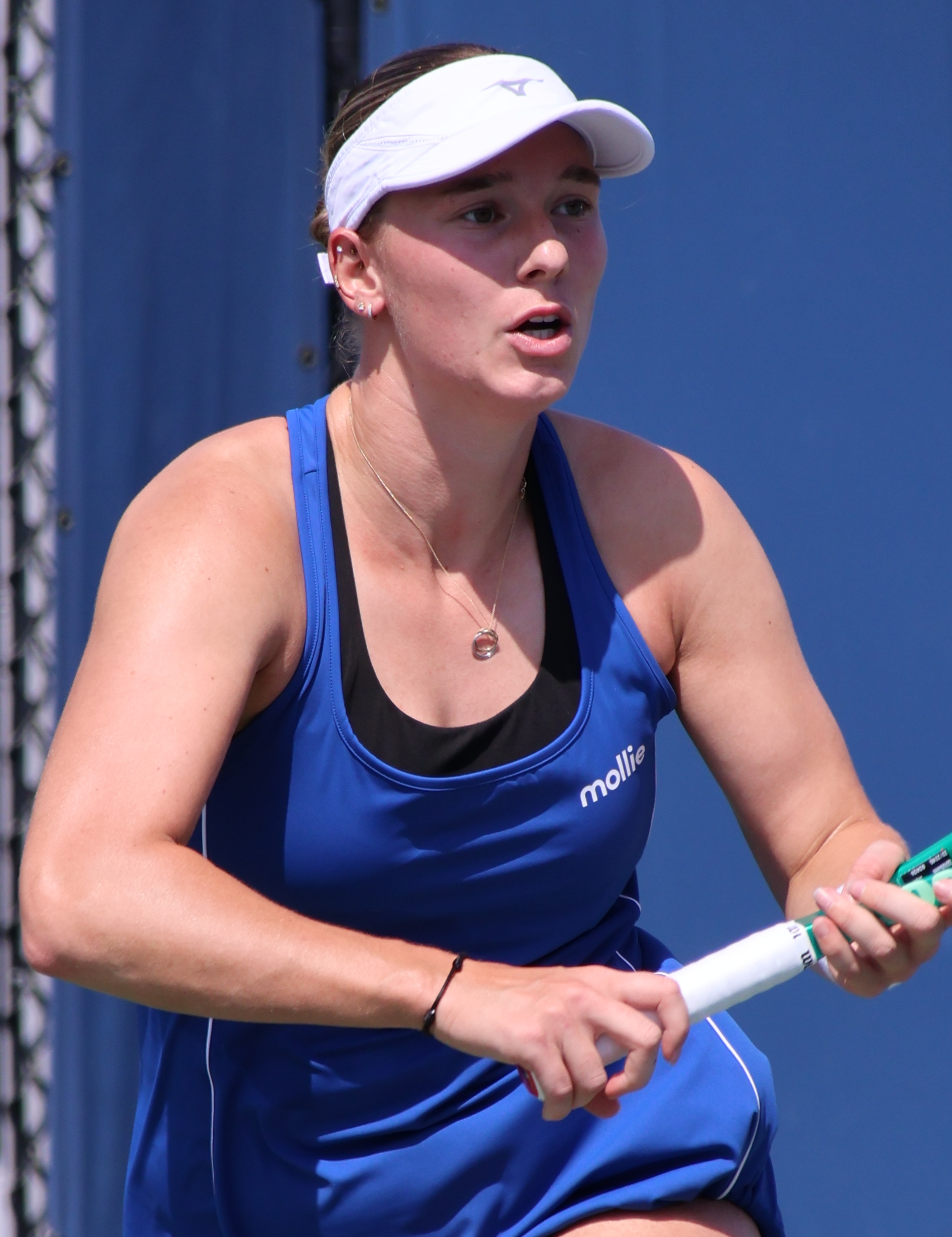
- Koevermans at the 2026 US Open
- Country (sports): Netherlands
- Born: 2 January 2004 (age 22) Berkel en Rodenrijs, Netherlands
- Plays: Right (two-handed backhand)
- Prize money: $500,828

Singles
- Career record: 195–130
- Career titles: 3 ITF
- Highest ranking: No. 154 (2 March 2026)
- Current ranking: No. 235 (19 October 2026)

Grand Slam singles results
- Australian Open: Q2 (2026)
- French Open: Q2 (2025)
- Wimbledon: Q2 (2025)
- US Open: 1R (2026)

Doubles
- Career record: 32–32
- Career titles: 1 ITF
- Highest ranking: No. 737 (15 April 2024)
- Current ranking: No. 1,777 (19 October 2026)

Team competitions
- Fed Cup: 6–3
- Last updated on: 23 October 2026.

Anouk Koevermans (born 2 January 2004) is a Dutch professional tennis player. She has a career-high singles ranking of No. 154 by the WTA, achieved on 2 March 2026. She also has a career-high doubles ranking of world No. 737, reached in 2024.

Competing for the Netherlands in the BJK Cup, Koevermans has a win–loss record of 6–3, as of October 2026.

== Career ==
Koevermans won her first bigger ITF title in May 2024 at the W50 event in Otočec, Slovenia.

== Personal life ==
Her father is Mark Koevermans, a former professional tennis player and former general manager of Dutch football club Feyenoord.

== Grand Slam singles performance timeline ==
Key
W	F	SF	QF	#R	RR	Q#	DNQ	A	NH

(W) winner; (F) finalist; (SF) semifinalist; (QF) quarterfinalist; (#R) rounds 4, 3, 2, 1; (RR) round-robin stage; (Q#) qualification round; (DNQ) did not qualify; (A) absent; (NH) not held; (SR) strike rate (events won / competed); (W–L) win–loss record.
To avoid confusion and double counting, these charts are updated at the conclusion of a tournament or when the player's participation has ended.

Tournament	2025	2025	SR	W–L
Australian Open	Q1	Q2	0 / 0	0–0
French Open	Q2	Q1	0 / 0	0–0
Wimbledon	Q2	Q1	0 / 0	0–0
US Open	Q1	1R	0 / 1	0–1
Win–Loss	0–0	0–1	0 / 1	0–1

== WTA 125 finals ==
=== Singles: 2 (runner-ups) ===
Result	W–L	Date	Tournament	Surface	Opponent	Score
Loss	0–2	Jul 2025	Palermo Ladies Open, Italy	Clay	(United Kingdom) Francesca Jones	3–6, 2–6
Loss	0–1	Sep 2025	Open de San Sebastián, Spain	Clay	(Russia) Oksana Selekhmeteva	0–6, 4–6

== ITF Circuit finals ==
=== Singles: 8 (3 titles, 5 runner-ups) ===
Legend
W75 tournaments
W40/50 tournaments
W15 tournaments

Result	W–L	Date	Tournament	Tier	Surface	Opponent	Score
Loss	0–1	Sep 2022	ITF Haren, Netherlands	W15	Clay	(Germany) Sina Herrmann	5–7, 7–5, 3–6
Loss	0–2	May 2023	ITF Kursumlijska Banja, Serbia	W15	Clay	(Greece) Michaela Laki	1–6, 4–6
Loss	0–3	Sep 2023	ITF Oldenzaal, Netherlands	W40	Clay	(Czech Republic) Brenda Fruhvirtová	5–7, 2–6
Win	1–3	May 2024	ITF Otočec, Slovenia	W50	Clay	(Andorra) Victoria Jiménez Kasintseva	1–6, 6–4, 7–5
Win	2–3	Jul 2024	Internazionali di Cordenons, Italy	W75	Clay	(Croatia) Lucija Ćirić Bagarić	7–6^{(4)}, 6–2
Loss	2–4	Oct 2024	Challenger de Saguenay, Canada	W75+H	Hard (i)	(Croatia) Petra Marčinko	3–6, 6–4, 6–7^{(3)}
Loss	2–5	Aug 2025	ITF Koksijde, Belgium	W50+H	Clay	(Japan) Ikumi Yamazaki	1–6, 4–6
Win	3–5	Feb 2026	Porto Indoor, Portugal	W75	Hard (i)	(United Kingdom) Harriet Dart	6–2, 1–0 ret.

=== Doubles: 2 (1 title, 1 runner-up) ===
Legend W15 tournaments	Finals by surface Hard (1–1)

Result	W–L	Date	Tournament	Tier	Surface	Partner	Opponents	Score
Loss	0–1	Nov 2021	ITF Monastir, Tunisia	W15	Hard	(Netherlands) Lexie Stevens	(Bulgaria) Gergana Topalova (Belgium) Eliessa Vanlangendonck	1–6, 2–6
Win	1–1	Mar 2023	ITF Monastir, Tunisia	W15	Hard	(Netherlands) Marente Sijbesma	(Italy) Angelica Raggi (Italy) Jennifer Ruggeri	6–4, 6–3
