= Tennis at the 2022 Mediterranean Games =

Tennis competition

- Venue: Habib Khelil Tennis Complex
- Dates: 27 June – 1 July

The tennis competitions at the 2022 Mediterranean Games in Oran took place from 27 June to 1 July at the Habib Khelil Tennis Complex. Athletes will compete in 4 events.

== Medal table ==
* Host nation (Algeria)

Rank	Nation	Gold	Silver	Bronze	Total
1	Spain	2	2	1	5
2	Italy	2	1	1	4
3	Malta	0	1	0	1
4	Morocco	0	0	2	2
Totals (4 entries)		4	4	4	12

== Medalists ==
Event	Gold	Silver	Bronze
Men's singles	Francesco Passaro; Italy	Carlos López Montagud; Spain	Adam Moundir; Morocco
Men's doubles	Matteo Arnaldi; Francesco Passaro; Italy	Carlos López Montagud; Álvaro López San Martín; Spain	Elliot Benchetrit; Adam Moundir; Morocco
Women's singles	Guiomar Maristany; Spain	Nuria Brancaccio; Italy	Jéssica Bouzas Maneiro; Spain
Women's doubles	Jéssica Bouzas Maneiro; Guiomar Maristany; Spain	Francesca Curmi; Elaine Genovese; Malta	Nuria Brancaccio; Aurora Zantedeschi; Italy
