= Malta at the 2022 Mediterranean Games =

- IOC code: MLT
- NOC: Maltese Olympic Committee

in Oran, Algeria 25 June 2022 – 6 July 2022
- Flag bearers: Francesca Curmi; Marlon Attard
- Medals Ranked 23rd: Gold 0 Silver 1 Bronze 0 Total 1

Mediterranean Games appearances (overview)
- 1951; 1955; 1959; 1963; 1967; 1971; 1975; 1979; 1983; 1987; 1991; 1993; 1997; 2001; 2005; 2009; 2013; 2018; 2022

Malta competed at the 2022 Mediterranean Games held in Oran, Algeria from 25 June to 6 July 2022.

== Medalists ==
Medal	Name	Sport	Event	Date
Silver	Francesca Curmi; Elaine Genovese	Tennis	Women's doubles	30 June

== Athletics ==
Malta competed in athletics.

== Cycling ==
Malta competed in cycling.

== Sailing ==
Malta competed in sailing.

== Shooting ==
Malta competed in shooting.

== Tennis ==
Malta won one silver medal in tennis.
