= Guiomar Maristany =

Spanish tennis player (born 1999)

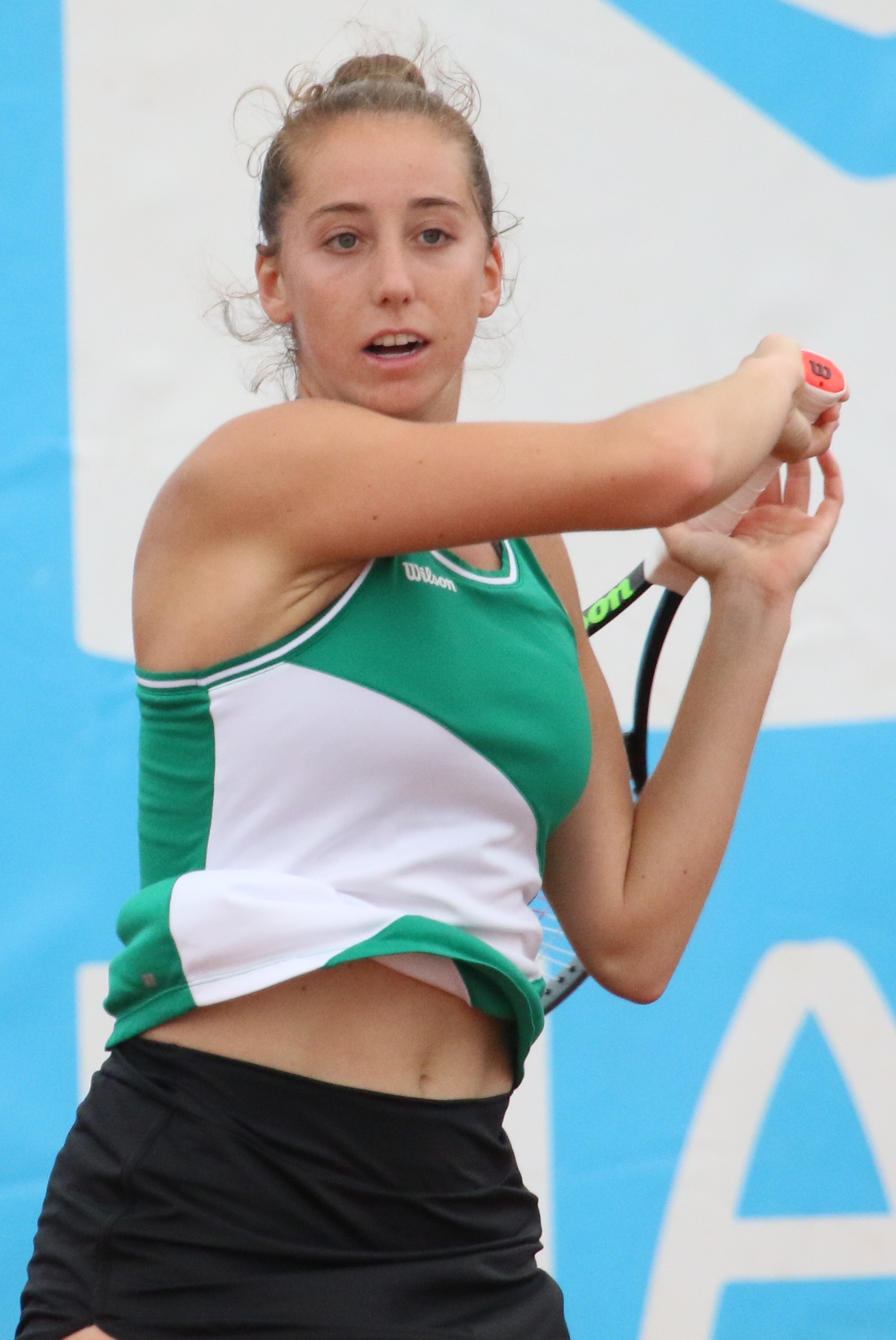
- Maristany in 2021
- Full name: Guiomar Maristany Zuleta de Reales
- Country (sports): Spain
- Born: 19 February 1999 (age 27) Barcelona, Spain
- Height: 170 cm (5 ft 7 in)
- Turned pro: 2015
- Plays: Right (two-handed backhand)
- Prize money: $588,594

Singles
- Career record: 333–214
- Career titles: 9 ITF
- Highest ranking: No. 138ª (26 October 2026)
- Current ranking: No. 138ª (26 October 2026)

Grand Slam singles results
- Australian Open: 1R (2026)
- French Open: Q3 (2026)
- Wimbledon: Q1 (2025)
- US Open: Q2 (2025, 2026)

Doubles
- Career record: 81–69
- Career titles: 6 ITF
- Highest ranking: No. 287 (30 January 2023)
- Current ranking: No. 618 (28 September 2026)
Medal record
Representing Spain
Women's tennis
Mediterranean Games
Gold medal – first place	2022 Oran	Singles
Gold medal – first place	2022 Oran	Doubles
- Last updated on: 26 October 2026.

Guiomar Maristany Zuleta de Reales (born 19 February 1999) is a Spanish tennis player. She has a career-high WTA singles ranking of world No. 138, achieved on 26 October 2026. On 30 January 2023, she peaked at No. 287 in the WTA doubles rankings. She has won eight titles in singles and six in doubles on the ITF Women's Circuit.

== Career ==
=== 2022–2023: Mediterranean Games gold medals ===
In March 2022, Maristany became the champion in Palma Nova, Spain by defeating Argentine Solana Sierra. In May, she won her fifth career singles title by defeating compatriot Jéssica Bouzas Maneiro in the final. She played a $25k final in Madrid in June 2022.

She won gold medals in singles and doubles at the 2022 Mediterranean Games in Oran, Algeria. In the finals, she defeated Italian Nuria Brancaccio in singles, and, alongside Jéssica Bouzas Maneiro, overcame Maltese Francesca Curmi and Elaine Genovese in the doubles final.

Maristany gained entry into the WTA 125 2023 Open Internacional de Valencia as a lucky loser, defeating Alena Fomina-Klotz to reach the second round, where she lost to Marina Bassols Ribera.

=== 2024–2025: WTA Tour debut ===
Given a wildcard entry into the WTA 125 2024 Catalonia Open, she made it through to the semifinals with wins over Nao Hibino, Dejana Radanović and third seed Arantxa Rus, before her run was ended by Mayar Sherif.

Maristany made her WTA Tour main-draw debut at the 2025 Iași Open, losing in the first round to third seed Ann Li in three sets.

=== 2026: Major debut, first WTA Tour win, top 150 ===
Maristany made her Grand Slam tournament debut at the 2026 Australian Open in the longest final qualifying contest, with a three sets win over Elvina Kalieva in 2 hours and 57 minutes. She lost in the main draw first round to Polina Kudermetova.

At the Copa Colsanitas, Maristany defeated seventh seed Francesca Jones for her first WTA Tour main-draw win, before losing to Emiliana Arango in the second round.

In September, she reached her maiden WTA 125 final at the Tolentino Open, losing to third seed Julia Grabher. As a result of her performance at the tournament, Maristany broke into the top 150 in the WTA rankings for the first time at world No. 145 on 28 September 2026.

== Grand Slam singles performance timeline ==
Key
W	F	SF	QF	#R	RR	Q#	DNQ	A	NH

(W) winner; (F) finalist; (SF) semifinalist; (QF) quarterfinalist; (#R) rounds 4, 3, 2, 1; (RR) round-robin stage; (Q#) qualification round; (DNQ) did not qualify; (A) absent; (NH) not held; (SR) strike rate (events won / competed); (W–L) win–loss record.
To avoid confusion and double counting, these charts are updated at the conclusion of a tournament or when the player's participation has ended.

=== Singles ===
Tournament	2024	2025	2026	W–L
Australian Open	A	Q1	1R	3–2
French Open	A	Q2	Q3	3–2
Wimbledon	A	Q1	A	0–1
US Open	Q1	Q2	Q2	2–3
Win–loss	0–1	2–4	6–3	8–8

== WTA 125 finals ==
=== Singles: 1 (1 runner-up) ===
Result	W–L	Date	Tournament	Surface	Opponent	Score
Loss	0–1	Sep 2026	Tolentino Open, Italy	Clay	(Austria) Julia Grabher	6–7^{(5–7)}, 2–6

== ITF Circuit finals ==
=== Singles: 16 (9 titles, 7 runner-ups) ===
Legend W60/75 tournaments (0–2) W50 tournaments (2–0) W25/35 tournaments (4–4) W15 tournaments (3–1)	Finals by surface Hard (0–2) Clay (9–5)

Result	W–L	Date	Tournament	Tier	Surface	Opponent	Score
Loss	0–1	Jun 2017	ITF Madrid, Spain	W15	Clay	(Spain) Rocío de la Torre Sánchez	1–6, 1–6
Win	1–1	Oct 2017	ITF Telde, Spain	W15	Clay	(Switzerland) Lisa Sabino	7–5, 4–6, 6–4
Win	2–1	May 2018	ITF Hammamet, Tunisia	W15	Clay	(Russia) Victoria Kan	7–6^{(1)}, 6–3
Loss	2–2	Aug 2018	ITF Las Palmas, Spain	W25	Clay	(Turkey) Başak Eraydın	4–6, 3–6
Win	3–2	Jul 2019	ITF Palmela, Portugal	W25	Clay	(Spain) Eva Guerrero Álvarez	6–3, 7–5
Win	4–2	Mar 2022	ITF Palmanova, Spain	W15	Clay	(Argentina) Solana Sierra	6–3, 6–2
Win	5–2	May 2022	ITF Platja d'Aro, Spain	W25	Clay	(Spain) Jéssica Bouzas Maneiro	7–6^{(2)}, 6–4
Loss	5–3	Jun 2022	ITF Madrid, Spain	W25	Hard	(Australia) Jaimee Fourlis	4–6, 2–6
Win	6–3	Mar 2023	ITF Palmanova, Spain	W25	Clay	(Spain) Rosa Vicens Mas	6–4, 1–6, 6–1
Loss	6–4	Dec 2023	ITF Monastir, Tunisia	W25	Hard	Alina Charaeva	2–6, 4–6
Win	7–4	Jan 2024	ITF Antalya, Turkey	W50	Clay	(Slovenia) Polona Hercog	6–4, 6–1
Loss	7–5	Jul 2024	ITF Torino, Italy	W35	Clay	(Argentina) Solana Sierra	6–4, 2–6, 0–6
Loss	7–6	Sep 2024	Lisboa Belém Open, Portugal	W75	Clay	(Andorra) Victoria Jiménez Kasintseva	4–6, 2–6
Win	8–6	Mar 2025	ITF Sabadell, Spain	W35	Clay	(Australia) Astra Sharma	6–3, 6–3
Loss	8–7	May 2025	Zagreb Open, Croatia	W75	Clay	(Croatia) Tara Würth	2–6, 6–4, 3–6
Win	9–7	Nov 2025	ITF Heraklion, Greece	W50	Clay	(Italy) Lisa Pigato	2–6, 6–2, 6–2

=== Doubles: 11 (6 titles, 5 runner-ups) ===
Legend W60 tournaments (1–1) W25 tournaments (3–3) W10/15 tournaments (1–1)	Finals by surface Hard (2–1) Clay (4–4)

Result	W–L	Date	Tournament	Tier	Surface	Partner	Opponents	Score
Win	1–0	Oct 2016	ITF Telde, Spain	W10	Clay	(Spain) Lucía de la Puerta Uribe	(Switzerland) Leonie Küng (Germany) Vivian Wolff	7–5, 6–4
Loss	1–1	Jun 2017	ITF Hammamet, Tunisia	W15	Clay	(Spain) Lucía de la Puerta Uribe	(Chile) Fernanda Brito (Bolivia) Noelia Zeballos	1–6, 3–6
Loss	1–2	Nov 2017	ITF Sant Cugat del Vallès, Spain	W25	Clay	(Serbia) Olga Danilović	(Brazil) Luisa Stefani (Mexico) Renata Zarazúa	1–6, 4–6
Loss	1–3	Jul 2018	ITF Getxo, Spain	W25	Clay	(Spain) Marina Bassols Ribera	(Spain) Yvonne Cavallé Reimers (Spain) Ángela Fita Boluda	3–6, 2–6
Win	2–3	Apr 2022	ITF Oeiras, Portugal	W25	Clay	(Spain) Jéssica Bouzas Maneiro	(Portugal) Francisca Jorge (Portugal) Matilde Jorge	3–6, 6–4, [10–8]
Win	3–3	Jun 2022	ITF Madrid, Spain	W25	Hard	(Spain) Yvonne Cavallé Reimers	(Sweden) Jacqueline Cabaj Awad; Valeria Savinykh	6–4, 6–4
Win	4–3	Jul 2022	Amstelveen Open, Netherlands	W60	Clay	(Spain) Aliona Bolsova	(Czech Republic) Michaela Bayerlová (Czech Republic) Aneta Laboutková	6–2, 6–2
Loss	4–4	Oct 2022	Open de San Sebastián, Spain	W60	Clay	(Spain) Ángela Fita Boluda	(Spain) Aliona Bolsova (Ukraine) Katarina Zavatska	2–1 ret.
Win	5–4	Aug 2023	ITF Ourense, Spain	W25	Hard	(Spain) Lucía Cortez Llorca	(Romania) Karola Bejenaru (France) Yasmine Mansouri	6–4, 3–6, [10–6]
Loss	5–5	Nov 2023	ITF Limassol, Cyprus	W25	Hard	(Germany) Katharina Hobgarski	(Czech Republic) Julie Štruplová (Belgium) Hanne Vandewinkel	4–6, 4–6
Win	6–5	Nov 2025	ITF Heraklion, Greece	W50	Clay	(Spain) Andrea Lázaro García	(Greece) Marianne Argyrokastriti (Ukraine) Kateryna Diatlova	walkover

== National representation ==
=== Multi-sports event ===
Maristany made her debut representing Spain in multi-sports event at the 2022 Mediterranean Games, she won the women's singles and the doubles gold medal.

==== Singles: 1 (gold) ====
Result	Date	Tournament	Surface	Opponent	Score
Gold	June 2022	Mediterranean Games, Oran, Algeria	Clay	(Italy) Nuria Brancaccio	6–2, 5–7, 6–2

==== Doubles: 1 (gold) ====
Result	Date	Tournament	Surface	Partner	Opponents	Score
Gold	June 2022	Mediterranean Games, Oran, Algeria	Clay	(Spain) Jéssica Bouzas Maneiro	(Malta) Francesca Curmi (Malta) Elaine Genovese	6–3, 6–2
