= Elaine Genovese =

Maltese tennis player (born 1991)

- Country (sports): Malta
- Residence: Sliema, Malta
- Born: 11 January 1991 (age 35) Pietà, Malta
- Plays: Right-handed (two-handed backhand)
- Prize money: $18,414

Singles
- Career record: 85–84
- Career titles: 0
- Highest ranking: No. 902 (24 December 2018)

Doubles
- Career record: 53–70
- Career titles: 3 ITF
- Highest ranking: No. 542 (31 July 2023)
- Current ranking: No. 768 (1 January 2024)

Team competitions
- Fed Cup: 33–43
- Last updated on: 1 January 2024.

Elaine Genovese (born 11 January 1991) is a Maltese tennis player.

She has a career-high doubles ranking by the Women's Tennis Association (WTA) of 542, achieved on 31 July 2023.

Genovese has represented Malta in the Fed Cup, where she has a win–loss record of 33–43.

Partnering Francesca Curmi, she won the silver medal in the women's doubles at the 2022 Mediterranean Games, losing in the final to Spanish duo Jéssica Bouzas Maneiro and Guiomar Maristany.

== ITF Circuit finals ==
=== Doubles: 6 (3 titles, 3 runner-ups) ===
Legend $25,000 tournaments $15,000 tournaments	Finals by surface Hard (2–3) Clay (1–0)

Result	W–L	Date	Tournament	Tier	Surface	Partner	Opponents	Score
Loss	0–1	Oct 2017	ITF Nonthaburi, Thailand	15,000	Hard	(Finland) Oona Orpana	(Thailand) Nudnida Luangnam (Thailand) Varunya Wongteanchai	4–6, 4–6
Win	1–1	Jul 2018	ITF Bucharest, Romania	15,000	Clay	(United Kingdom) Soumeya Anane	(Romania) Ioana Gaspar (Romania) Camelia Hristea	6–4, 3–6, [10–2]
Loss	1–2	Oct 2018	ITF Monastir, Tunisia	15,000	Hard	(Algeria) Amira Benaïssa	(Croatia) Silvia Njirić (Italy) Miriana Tona	6–1, 6–7^{(2)}, [4–10]
Win	2–2	Aug 2022	ITF Vigo, Spain	25,000	Hard	(Malta) Francesca Curmi	(Denmark) Olga Helmi (Germany) Kathleen Kanev	6–0, 6–3
Loss	2–3	Apr 2023	ITF Monastir, Tunisia	15,000	Hard	(Vietnam) Savanna Lý Nguyễn	(Belgium) Amelie Van Impe (Belgium) Clara Vlasselaer	0–6, 7–6^{(2)}, [9–11]
Win	3–3	May 2023	ITF Monastir, Tunisia	15,000	Hard	(India) Sharmada Balu	(Canada) Louise Kwong (United States) Anna Ulyashchenko	0–6, 6–4, [11–9]
