= Aliona Bolsova =

Spanish-Moldovan tennis player (born 1997)

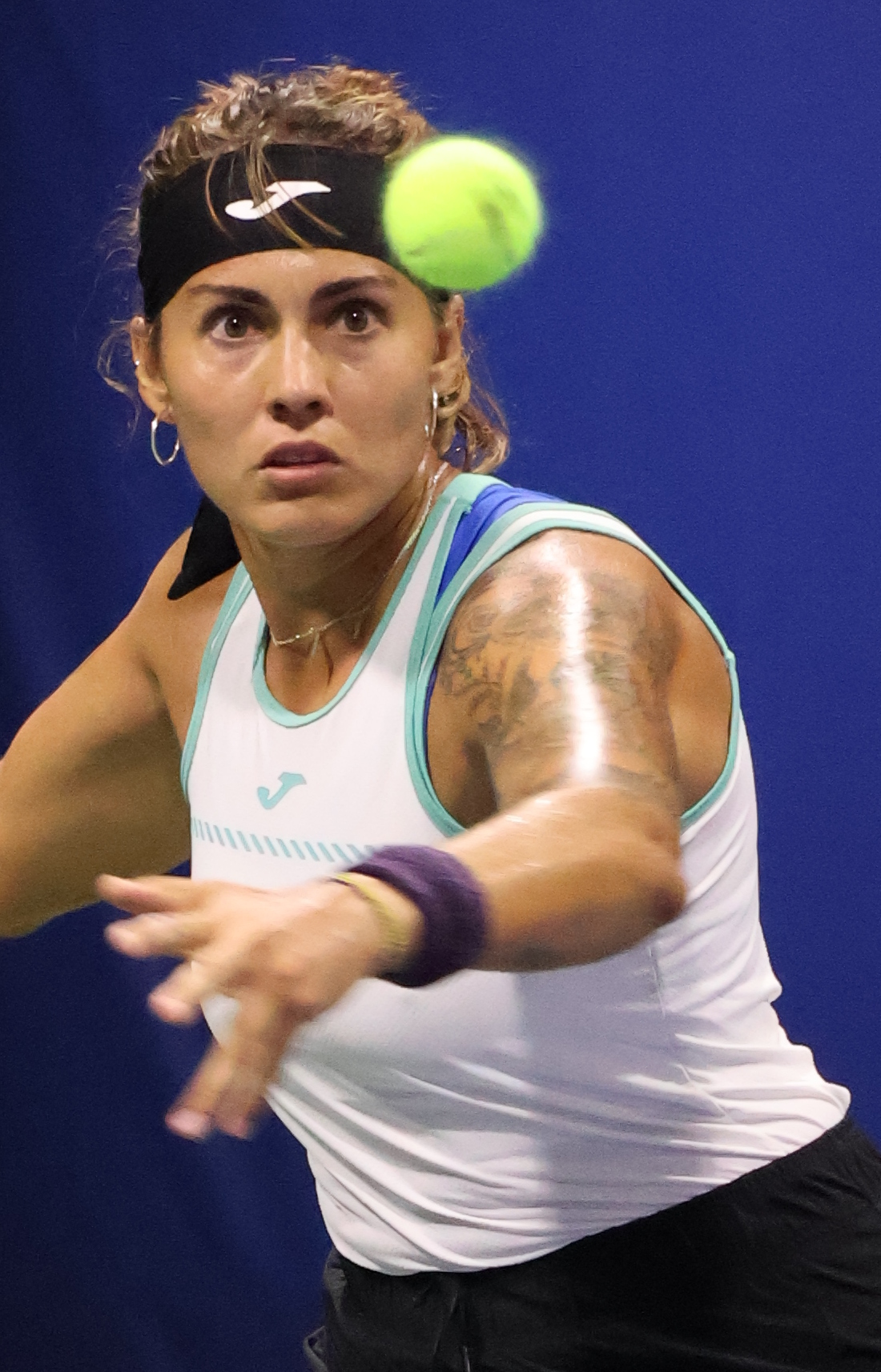
- Bolsova at the 2023 US Open
- Full name: Aliona Vadimovna Bolsova Zadoinova
- Native name: Aliona Bolșova
- Country (sports): Moldova (2012–Jan 2013); Spain (Apr 2013–)
- Born: 6 November 1997 (age 28) Chișinău, Moldova
- Height: 1.72 m (5 ft 8 in)
- Turned pro: 2018
- Retired: 30 April 2026
- Plays: Right (two-handed backhand)
- Coach: Lourdes Dominguez Lino
- Prize money: US$ 1,728,655

Singles
- Career record: 309–210
- Career titles: 9 ITF
- Highest ranking: No. 88 (31 July 2019)

Grand Slam singles results
- Australian Open: 1R (2021)
- French Open: 4R (2019)
- Wimbledon: 1R (2021)
- US Open: 2R (2019, 2020)

Doubles
- Career record: 173–106
- Career titles: 5 WTA 125
- Highest ranking: No. 54 (5 December 2022)

Grand Slam doubles results
- Australian Open: 3R (2021, 2022)
- French Open: 1R (2020, 2021, 2023)
- Wimbledon: 2R (2022)
- US Open: 2R (2022, 2023)

Team competitions
- Fed Cup: 5–3

Aliona Vadimovna Bolsova Zadoinova (Note: Romanian: Aliona Bolșova) (born 6 November 1997) is a Spanish-Moldovan former professional tennis player. She reached career-high WTA rankings of No. 88 in singles and No. 54 in doubles. She won five doubles titles on the WTA Challenger Tour along with nine singles and 16 doubles titles on the ITF Circuit.

On the ITF Junior Circuit, Bolsova had a combined career-high ranking of No. 4, and reached the quarterfinals of the 2015 Australian Open.

Playing for Spain, Bolsova has a win-loss record of 5–3 in Billie Jean King Cup competitions.

== Personal life ==
Bolsova moved from Moldova to Spain at a young age. Her father, Vadim Zadoinov, and her mother, Olga Bolșova, were both Olympic athletes, and so were her maternal grandparents, athletes Viktor Bolshov and Valentyna Maslovskaya.

She represented Moldova from 2012 to 2013, until she gained Spanish citizenship in 2013.

== College ==
Bolsova played for Oklahoma State University's tennis team as a freshman in the 2016–17 season in NCAA play. There, her record was 31–7 in singles and 25–7 in doubles. Her tenure included helping OSU's team reach the final of the 2017 Big 12 Conference championship and the quarterfinals of the 2017 NCAA tournament.

In 2018, Bolsova played for Florida Atlantic University, going undefeated in singles with a record of 19–0. In doubles, she went 15–3. Bolsova turned professional following the Conference USA championship of 2018.

== Professional ==
At the 2019 French Open, she qualified for the main draw and reached the fourth round on her major debut in which she lost to Amanda Anisimova.

Partnering with Rebeka Masarova, Bolsova won the doubles draw at the 2022 Internacional de Valencia, defeating Alexandra Panova and Arantxa Rus in the final. She also won the doubles title at the 2022 Țiriac Foundation Trophy, teaming with Andrea Gámiz to overcome Réka Luca Jani and Panna Udvardy in the final.

Bolsova entered the main draw at the 2023 French Open as a lucky loser and won her first-round match against Kristína Kučová, before losing to Anna Karolína Schmiedlová.

Partnering with Katarzyna Kawa, she was runner-up in the doubles at the 2024 Țiriac Foundation Trophy, losing to Carole Monnet and Darja Semeņistaja in the final.

Bolsova ended also runner-up in the doubles at the 2024 Bolivia Open, partnering with Valeriya Strakhova, and losing the final to Nuria Brancaccio and Leyre Romero Gormaz.

In November 2025, Bolsova announced her retirement from professional tennis, with her final appearance at the 2026 Catalonia Open Solgironès in April 2026.

== Performance timelines ==
Key
W	F	SF	QF	#R	RR	Q#	DNQ	A	NH

(W) winner; (F) finalist; (SF) semifinalist; (QF) quarterfinalist; (#R) rounds 4, 3, 2, 1; (RR) round-robin stage; (Q#) qualification round; (DNQ) did not qualify; (A) absent; (NH) not held; (SR) strike rate (events won / competed); (W–L) win–loss record.
To avoid confusion and double counting, these charts are updated at the conclusion of a tournament or when the player's participation has ended.

Only main-draw results in WTA Tour, Grand Slam tournaments, Billie Jean King Cup, United Cup, Hopman Cup and Olympic Games are included in win–loss records.

=== Singles ===
Tournament	2018	2019	2020	2021	2022	2023	2024	2025	2026	SR	W–L	Win %
Grand Slam tournaments
Australian Open	A	Q2	Q2	1R	Q3	Q2	Q1	Q1	Q1	0 / 1	0–1	0%
French Open	A	4R	1R	Q1	Q1	2R	A	A	-	0 / 3	4–3	57%
Wimbledon	A	Q1	NH	1R	Q1	Q1	A	A	-	0 / 1	0–1	0%
US Open	Q3	2R	2R	Q1	Q1	Q2	Q1	A	-	0 / 2	2–2	50%
Win–Loss	0–0	4–2	1–2	0–2	0–0	1–1	0–0	0–0	0–0	0 / 7	6–7	46%
WTA 1000 tournaments
Miami Open	A	A	NH	1R	A	A	A	A	A	0 / 1	0–1	0%
Madrid Open	A	Q2	NH	Q1	A	Q2	A	2R	-	0 / 1	1–1	50%
Italian Open	A	A	2R	Q1	A	Q2	A	A	-	0 / 1	1–1	50%
Cincinnati Open	A	A	Q1	A	A	A	A	A	-	0 / 0	0–0	–
Career statistics
Tournaments	0	6	4	9	0	4	0	1	0	Career total: 24		
Overall win–loss	0–0	6–6	2–4	3–9	0–0	1–4	0–0	2–2	0–0	0 / 25	14–25	36%
Year-end ranking	163	114	103	157	193	137	540	231	-	$1,728,655		

=== Doubles ===
Tournament	2019	2020	2021	2022	2023	SR	W–L	Win %
Grand Slam tournaments
Australian Open	A	A	3R	3R	1R	0 / 3	4–3	57%
French Open	A	1R	1R	A	1R	0 / 3	0–3	0%
Wimbledon	A	NH	A	2R	A	0 / 1	1–1	50%
US Open	A	A	A	2R	2R	0 / 2	2–2	50%
Win–Loss	0–0	0–1	2–2	4–3	1–3	0 / 9	7–9	44%
WTA 1000 tournaments
Madrid Open	1R	NH	A	A	A	0 / 1	0–1	0%
Career statistics
Tournaments	3	2	5	4	2	Career total: 16		
Overall win–loss	2–2	0–2	7–6	7–5	0–2	0 / 16	16–17	48%
Year-end ranking	301	290	85	58	100			

== WTA Tour finals ==
=== Doubles: 1 (runner-up) ===
Legend WTA 250 (0–1)	Finals by surface Clay (0–1)

Result	Date	Tournament	Tier	Surface	Partner	Opponent	Score
Loss	Jul 2021	Budapest Grand Prix, Hungary	WTA 250	Clay	(Germany) Tamara Korpatsch	(Romania) Mihaela Buzărnescu (Hungary) Fanny Stollár	4–6, 4–6

== WTA 125 finals ==
=== Doubles: 10 (5 titles, 5 runner-ups) ===
Result	W–L	Date	Tournament	Surface	Partner	Opponents	Score
Win	1–0	Jun 2021	Bol Ladies Open, Croatia	Clay	(Poland) Katarzyna Kawa	(Georgia (country)) Ekaterine Gorgodze (Slovakia) Tereza Mihalíková	6–1, 4–6, [10–6]
Win	2–0	Jun 2022	Internacional de Valencia, Spain	Clay	(Spain) Rebeka Masarova	Alexandra Panova (Netherlands) Arantxa Rus	6–0, 6–3
Win	3–0	Sep 2022	Romanian Ladies Open, Romania	Clay	(Venezuela) Andrea Gámiz	(Hungary) Réka Luca Jani (Hungary) Panna Udvardy	7–5, 6–3
Win	4–0	Apr 2023	San Luis Open, Mexico	Clay	(Venezuela) Andrea Gámiz	(Georgia (country)) Oksana Kalashnikova (Poland) Katarzyna Piter	7–6^{(5)}, 6–4
Loss	4–1	Jun 2023	Solgironès Open, Spain	Clay	(Spain) Rebeka Masarova	(United States) Caroline Dolehide; Diana Shnaider	6–7^{(5)}, 3–6
Win	5–1	Jun 2023	Internacional de Valencia, Spain (2)	Clay	(Venezuela) Andrea Gámiz	Angelina Gabueva; Irina Khromacheva	6–4, 4–6, [10–7]
Loss	5–2	Sep 2024	Țiriac Foundation Trophy, Romania	Clay	(Poland) Katarzyna Kawa	(France) Carole Monnet (Latvia) Darja Semeņistaja	6–1, 2–6, [7–10]
Loss	5–3	Oct 2024	Bolivia Open, Bolivia	Clay	(Ukraine) Valeriya Strakhova	(Italy) Nuria Brancaccio (Spain) Leyre Romero Gormaz	4-6, 4–6
Loss	5–4	Feb 2025	Cancún Open, Mexico	Hard	(Spain) Yvonne Cavallé Reimers	(Australia) Maya Joint (Australia) Taylah Preston	4–6, 3–6
Loss	5–5	Feb 2026	Les Sables d'Olonne Open, France	Hard (i)	(Spain) Irene Burillo	(United States) Carol Young Suh Lee (Czech Republic) Anna Sisková	2–6, 3–6

== ITF Circuit finals ==
=== Singles: 19 (9 titles, 10 runner-ups) ===
Legend
W80 tournaments (1–0)
60k / W60 tournaments (2–3)
25k / W25 / W35 tournaments (2–5)
10k tournaments (4–2)

Result	W–L	Date	Tournament	Tier	Surface	Opponent	Score
Loss	0–1	Nov 2012	ITF Coimbra, Portugal	10k	Hard	(Liechtenstein) Kathinka von Deichmann	1–6, 3–6
Win	1–1	Sep 2013	ITF Lleida, Spain	10k	Clay	(Egypt) Mayar Sherif	0–6, 6–3, 6–2
Win	2–1	Jul 2014	ITF Les Contamines, France	10k	Hard	(Germany) Tayisiya Morderger	3–6, 6–3, 6–0
Loss	2–2	May 2015	ITF Santa Margherita di Pula, Italy	10k	Clay	(Italy) Bianca Turati	6–2, 4–6, 5–7
Win	3–2	Jun 2015	ITF Madrid, Spain	10k	Clay (i)	(Spain) Lucía Cervera Vázquez	7–5, 3–6, 6–4
Win	4–2	Jul 2015	ITF Getxo, Spain	10k	Clay	(Italy) Corinna Dentoni	6–0, 6–2
Loss	4–3	May 2018	Torneo Conchita Martínez, Spain	25k	Hard	(United Kingdom) Katie Swan	2–6, 3–6
Loss	4–4	Jun 2018	Internacional de Barcelona, Spain	25k	Clay	(Spain) Estrella Cabeza Candela	2–6, 3–6
Win	5–4	Jul 2018	ITF Getxo, Spain	25k	Clay	(Spain) Olga Sáez Larra	6–0, 6–1
Win	6–4	Jul 2018	ITF Darmstadt, Germany	25k	Clay	(Germany) Katharina Gerlach	6–2, 6–1
Loss	6–5	Sep 2018	Open de Valencia, Spain	60k+H	Clay	(Spain) Paula Badosa	1–6, 6–4, 2–6
Loss	6–6	Oct 2018	ITF Riba-Roja de Turia, Spain	25k	Clay	(Belgium) Marie Benoît	0–6, 6–7^{(2)}
Loss	6–7	Feb 2020	Cairo Open, Egypt	W60	Hard	(Ukraine) Marta Kostyuk	1–6, 0–6
Loss	6–8	Jun 2022	ITF Denain, France	W25	Clay	(Spain) Leyre Romero Gormaz	4–6, 6–3, 4–6
Win	7–8	Sep 2022	Vrnjačka Banja Open, Serbia	W60	Clay	(Slovenia) Nina Potočnik	7–5, 6–1
Loss	7–9	Oct 2022	Open de San Sebastián, Spain	W60	Clay	(Austria) Julia Grabher	3–6, 6–7^{(3)}
Win	8–9	Nov 2022	Open Villa de Madrid, Spain	W80	Clay	(Germany) Tamara Korpatsch	6–4, 6–2
Win	9–9	Apr 2023	Koper Open, Slovenia	W60	Clay	(Romania) Irina Bara	3–6, 6–2, 4–1 ret.
Loss	9–10	Sep 2025	ITF Reus, Spain	W35	Clay	(Croatia) Lucija Ćirić Bagarić	1–6, 6–3, 1–6

=== Doubles: 26 (17 titles, 9 runner-ups) ===
Legend
W100 tournaments (1–3)
W80 tournaments (2–0)
W60 / W75 tournaments (2–3)
25k / W35 tournaments (4–1)
10k / 15k / W15 tournaments (8–2)

Result	W–L	Date	Tournament	Tier	Surface	Partner	Opponents	Score
Loss	0–1	Nov 2012	ITF Coimbra, Portugal	10k	Hard	(Russia) Ulyana Ayzatulina	(Russia) Nadezda Gorbachkova (Russia) Ekaterina Pushkareva	2–6, 3–6
Win	1–1	Jul 2014	ITF Knokke, Belgium	10k	Clay	(Chile) Cecilia Costa Melgar	(Belgium) Justine De Sutter (Belgium) Sofie Oyen	4–6, 6–3, [10–4]
Win	2–1	Jul 2014	ITF Les Contamines, France	10k	Hard	(France) Carla Touly	(Italy) Sara Castellano (Italy) Chiara Quattrone	6–1, 6–1
Win	3–1	Sep 2014	ITF Madrid, Spain	10k	Hard	(Spain) Olga Sáez Larra	(Spain) Marta Huqi González Encinas (Spain) Estela Pérez Somarriba	6–1, 6–4
Win	4–1	Oct 2014	ITF Benicarló, Spain	10k	Clay	(Venezuela) Andrea Gámiz	(Australia) Alexandra Nancarrow (Spain) Inés Ferrer Suárez	6–2, 6–3
Win	5–1	Nov 2014	ITF Castellón, Spain	10k	Clay	(Venezuela) Andrea Gámiz	(Italy) Federica Arcidiacono (Italy) Martina Spigarelli	6–1, 6–2
Win	6–1	May 2015	ITF Pula, Italy	10k	Clay	(Australia) Priscilla Hon	(Spain) Cristina Bucșa (Spain) Eva Guerrero Álvarez	6–0, 6–3
Loss	6–2	Jun 2015	ITF Madrid, Spain	10k	Clay (i)	(Spain) Lucía Cervera Vázquez	(Belgium) Elyne Boeykens (Belgium) Steffi Distelmans	3–6, 6–7^{(4)}
Win	7–2	Sep 2015	ITF Barcelona, Spain	15k	Clay	(Italy) Gaia Sanesi	(Spain) Estrella Cabeza Candela (Ukraine) Oleksandra Korashvili	6–3, 6–4
Win	8–2	Oct 2018	ITF Riba-Roja de Turia, Spain	25k	Clay	(Greece) Despina Papamichail	(Spain) Marina Bassols Ribera (Spain) Ángela Fita Boluda	6−2, 6−2
Loss	8–3	Sep 2019	Open de Saint-Malo, France	W60+H	Clay	(Croatia) Tereza Mrdeža	(Georgia (country)) Ekaterine Gorgodze (Belgium) Maryna Zanevska	7–6^{(8)}, 5–7, [8–10]
Loss	8–4	Dec 2020	Dubai Tennis Challenge, UAE	W100	Hard	(Slovenia) Kaja Juvan	(Georgia (country)) Ekaterine Gorgodze (India) Ankita Raina	4–6, 6–3, [6–10]
Win	9–4	Sep 2021	Open de Valencia, Spain	W80	Clay	(Venezuela) Andrea Gámiz	(Georgia (country)) Ekaterine Gorgodze (Brazil) Laura Pigossi	6–3, 6–4
Loss	9–5	Apr 2022	Chiasso Open, Switzerland	W60	Clay	(Russia) Oksana Selekhmeteva	(Czech Republic) Anastasia Dețiuc (Czech Republic) Miriam Kolodziejová	3–6, 6–1, [8–10]
Win	10–5	Jul 2022	Amstelveen Open, Netherlands	W60	Clay	(Spain) Guiomar Maristany	(Czech Republic) Michaela Bayerlová (Czech Republic) Aneta Laboutková	6–2, 6–2
Win	11–5	Oct 2022	Open de San Sebastián, Spain	W60	Clay	(Ukraine) Katarina Zavatska	(Spain) Ángela Fita Boluda (Spain) Guiomar Maristany	1–2 ret.
Win	12–5	Oct 2022	ITF Les Franqueses del Vallès, Spain	W100	Hard	(Spain) Rebeka Masarova	(Japan) Misaki Doi (Indonesia) Beatrice Gumulya	7–5, 1–6, [10–3]
Win	13–5	Nov 2022	Open Villa de Madrid, Spain	W80	Clay	(Spain) Rebeka Masarova	(Croatia) Lea Bošković (Latvia) Daniela Vismane	6–3, 6–3
Loss	13–6	Nov 2023	Open de Valencia, Spain	W100	Clay	(Georgia (country)) Natela Dzalamidze	(Greece) Valentini Grammatikopoulou (Romania) Andreea Mitu	5–7, 4–6
Win	14–6	Sep 2024	ITF Pula, Italy	W35	Clay	(Netherlands) Eva Vedder	(Germany) Katharina Hobgarski (Czech Republic) Julie Štruplová	6–3, 6–3
Loss	14–7	Oct 2024	ITF Seville, Spain	W35	Clay	(Greece) Martha Matoula	(Spain) Ángela Fita Boluda (Switzerland) Ylena In-Albon	2–6, 1–6
Win	15–7	Mar 2025	ITF Sabadell, Spain	W35	Clay	(Switzerland) Ylena In-Albon	(Slovenia) Živa Falkner (Slovenia) Pia Lovrič	6–4, 6–0
Loss	15–8	Apr 2025	Zaragoza Open, Spain	W100	Clay	(Spain) Ángela Fita Boluda	(Australia) Olivia Gadecki (Indonesia) Aldila Sutjiadi	4–6, 3–6
Loss	15–9	Mar 2026	Trnava Indoor, Slovakia	W75	Hard (i)	(Spain) Yvonne Cavallé Reimers	(Czech Republic) Anna Sisková (Russia) Anastasia Tikhonova	1–6, 2–6
Win	16–9	Mar 2026	ITF Sabadell, Spain	W35	Clay	(Spain) Ángela Fita Boluda	(Spain) Lucía Cortez Llorca (Spain) Alicia Herrero Liñana	6–4, 6–1
Win	17–9	Aug 2026	ITF Torelló, Spain	W15	Hard	(Spain) Celia Cerviño Ruiz	(Mexico) Julia García Ruiz (Spain) Ariadna Garcia-Patrón Canals	6–2, 6–2
