= Francesca Curmi =

Maltese tennis player (born 2002)

- Country (sports): Malta
- Born: 7 July 2002 (age 24) Malta
- Plays: Right (two-handed backhand)
- Prize money: $90,255

Singles
- Career record: 185–118
- Career titles: 6 ITF
- Highest ranking: No. 192 (2 November 2026)
- Current ranking: No. 192 (2 November 2026)

Doubles
- Career record: 43–45
- Career titles: 2 ITF
- Highest ranking: No. 402 (17 July 2023)
- Current ranking: No. 1,187 (15 December 2025)

Team competitions
- Fed Cup: 19–8
- Last updated on: 15 December 2025.

Francesca Curmi (born 7 July 2002) is a Maltese tennis player.

Curmi has represented Malta in the Billie Jean King Cup, where she has a win–loss record of 19–8 (as of December 2025).

On the ITF Junior Circuit, Curmi has a career-high combined ranking of 64, achieved on 28 May 2018.

Curmi participated in 2018 Summer Youth Olympics in singles, doubles and mixed doubles. In doubles partnering with Eléonora Molinaro from Luxembourg. The Maltese-Luxembourgish pair lost in three sets to French pairing Clara Burel and Diane Parry, 4–6, 6–3, [5–10], in the first round.

Curmi represented Malta at the 2022 Mediterranean Games held in Oran, Algeria. Curmi and Elaine Genovese won the silver medal in the women's doubles event. She was also one of the flag bearers during the opening ceremony.

She made history when she became the first Maltese player to participate in a WTA Tour draw at the 2023 Palermo Ladies Open where she entered as a lucky loser, but was defeated in the first round by Cristina Bucșa.

Curmi qualified for the 2023 WTA 125 Angers Open and reached the second round, losing to McCartney Kessler, after her opening opponent, Patricia Maria Țig, retired during the third set of their match.

== Junior years ==
Grand Slam performance - Singles:

- Australian Open: 1R (2019)
- French Open: 1R (2018)
- Wimbledon: Q1 (2018)
- US Open: 1R (2018)

Grand Slam performance - Doubles:

- Australian Open: SF (2019)
- French Open: 1R (2018)
- Wimbledon: 2R (2018)
- US Open: 1R (2019)

== ITF Circuit finals ==
=== Singles: 11 (6 titles, 5 runner-ups) ===
Legend W75 tournaments (1–0) W50 tournaments (0–3) W25/35 tournaments (2–0) W15 tournaments (3–2)	Finals by surface Hard (3–4) Clay (2–1) Carpet (1–0)

Result	W–L	Date	Tournament	Tier	Surface	Opponent	Score
Loss	0–1	Feb 2021	ITF Monastir, Tunisia	W15	Hard	(Poland) Weronika Falkowska	2–6, 0–6
Loss	0–2	Apr 2022	ITF Monastir, Tunisia	W15	Hard	(Italy) Angelica Raggi	3–6, 6–3, 5–7
Win	1–2	Jun 2022	ITF Monastir, Tunisia	W15	Hard	(China) Yao Xinxin	6–2, 6–4
Win	2–2	Jun 2022	ITF Monastir, Tunisia	W15	Hard	(Japan) Sayaka Ishii	6–2, 4–6, 7–5
Win	3–2	May 2023	ITF Tossa de Mar, Spain	W25+H	Carpet	(Spain) Georgina García Pérez	6–2, 4–6, 7–6^{(2)}
Loss	3–3	Nov 2024	ITF Funchal, Portugal	W50	Hard	Kristina Dmitruk	1–6, 2–3 ret.
Loss	3–4	Mar 2025	ITF Nantes, France	W50	Hard (i)	(Australia) Talia Gibson	6–3, 5–7, 1–6
Win	4–4	Jul 2025	ITF Darmstadt, Germany	W35	Clay	(Germany) Josy Daems	6–2, 6–0
Win	5–4	Dec 2025	ITF Monastir, Tunisia	W15	Hard	(Lithuania) Justina Mikulskytė	7–5, 6–4
Loss	5–5	May 2026	ITF Portorož, Slovenia	W50	Clay	(Czech Republic) Julie Štruplová	3–6, 3–6
Win	6–5	Jun 2026	Internationaux de Blois, France	W75	Clay	Alevtina Ibragimova	6–3, 7–5

=== Doubles: 6 (2 titles, 4 runner-ups) ===
Legend W25/35 tournaments (2–2) W15 tournaments (0–2)	Finals by surface Hard (1–2) Clay (1–2)

Result	W–L	Date	Tournament	Tier	Surface	Partner	Opponents	Score
Loss	0–1	Nov 2019	ITF Antalya, Turkey	W15	Hard	(Spain) Paula Arias Manjón	(Czech Republic) Johana Marková (Slovenia) Nika Radišić	2–6, 6–4, [9–11]
Loss	0–2	May 2022	ITF Santa Margarida de Montbui, Spain	W15	Hard	(Serbia) Mihaela Đaković	(South Korea) Shin Ji-ho (Republic of Ireland) Celine Simunyu	6–7^{(3)}, 3–6
Win	1–2	Aug 2022	ITF Vigo, Spain	W25	Hard	(Malta) Elaine Genovese	(Denmark) Olga Helmi (Germany) Kathleen Kanev	6–0, 6–3
Loss	1–3	Mar 2024	ITF Alaminos, Cyprus	W35	Clay	(Romania) Cristina Dinu	(Croatia) Tena Lukas (France) Kristina Mladenovic	4–6, 5–7
Win	2–3	Mar 2024	ITF Alaminos, Cyprus	W35	Clay	(Greece) Despina Papamichail	(Switzerland) Leonie Küng (United Kingdom) Eliz Maloney	6–3, 6–2
Loss	2–4	Apr 2026	ITF Santa Margherita di Pula, Italy	W35	Clay	(Italy) Deborah Chiesa	(Czech Republic) Alena Kovačková (Czech Republic) Jana Kovačková	1–6, 3–6

== Head to head ==
=== Top 5 highest rank wins ===
#	Tournament	Category	Start date	Surface	Rd	Opponent	Rank	Score	FCR
1	Torneig Internacional Els Gorchs, Spain	ITF W100	23 October 2023	Hard	1R	(Slovenia) Tamara Zidanšek	No. 98	6–4, 3–1 ret.	No. 313
2	Open Villa de Madrid, Spain	ITF W80	14 November 2022	Clay	2R	(France) Océane Dodin	No. 109	6–4, 6–2	No. 484
3	ITF Funchal, Portugal	ITF W50	11 November 2024	Hard	QF	(Ukraine) Daria Snigur	No. 141	7–5, 3–2 ret.	No. 417
4	ITF Kuršumlijska Banja, Serbia	ITF W75	19 May 2025	Clay	2R	(China) Gao Xinyu	No. 147	6–2, 6–4	No. 369
5	Internationaux de Tennis de Blois, France	ITF W75	15 June 2026	Clay	2R	(Serbia) Lola Radivojević	No. 150	7–5, 6–3	No. 334

- statistics correct as of 20 June 2026.
