= Tunisia at the 2022 Mediterranean Games =

- IOC code: TUN
- NOC: Tunisian Olympic Committee

in Oran, Algeria 25 June – 5 July
- Competitors: 175 in 24 sports
- Medals Ranked 10th: Gold 6 Silver 8 Bronze 13 Total 27

Mediterranean Games appearances (overview)
- 1959; 1963; 1967; 1971; 1975; 1979; 1983; 1987; 1991; 1993; 1997; 2001; 2005; 2009; 2013; 2018; 2022; 2026

Tunisia competed at the 2022 Mediterranean Games in Oran, Algeria over 10 days from 25 June to 6 July 2022 with delegation of 263 persons (175 athletes in 24 sports).

== Medals ==
=== Medal table ===
Medal	Name	Sport	Event	Date
Gold	Mouna Béji; Asma Belli	Boules	Women's doubles	29 June
Silver	Wafa Mahjoub	Karate	Women's 61 kg	26 June
Bronze	Chehinez Jemi	Karate	Women's +68 kg	27 June
Bronze	Amine Guennichi	Wrestling	Men's Greco-Roman 130 kg	27 June
Bronze	Mohamed Saadaoui	Wrestling	Men's Freestyle 97 kg	28 June

Medals by sport
Sport	1st place, gold medalist(s)	2nd place, silver medalist(s)	3rd place, bronze medalist(s)	Total
Boules	1	0	0	1
Karate	0	1	1	2
Wrestling	0	0	2	2
Total	1	1	3	5

Medals by date
Day	Date	1st place, gold medalist(s)	2nd place, silver medalist(s)	3rd place, bronze medalist(s)	Total
1	26 June	0	1	0	1
2	27 June	0	0	2	2
3	28 June	0	0	1	1
4	29 June	1	0	0	1
5	30 June	0	0	0	0
6	1 July	0	0	0	0
7	2 July	0	0	0	0
8	3 July	0	0	0	0
9	4 July	0	0	0	0
10	5 July	0	0	0	0
Total		1	1	3	5

Medals by gender
Gender	1st place, gold medalist(s)	2nd place, silver medalist(s)	3rd place, bronze medalist(s)	Total
Male	0	0	2	2
Female	1	1	1	3
Total	1	1	3	5

== Archery ==
Athlete	Event	Ranking round		Round of 24	Round of 16	Round of 8	Quarterfinals	Semifinals	Final / BM	
Athlete	Event	Score	Seed	Opposition Score	Opposition Score	Opposition Score	Opposition Score	Opposition Score	Opposition Score	Rank
Mohamed Hammed	Men's individual	614	23	Bye	Castro (ESP); L 0—6	Did not advance				
Rihab Elwalid	Women's individual	628	12	—N/a	Hadjierotocritou (CYP); L 4—6	Did not advance				
Mohamed Hammed/ Rihab Elwalid	Mixed team	1242	7	—N/a	—N/a	Algeria (ALG); W 6–4	Greece (GRE); L 0–6	Did not advance		

== Basketball ==
Athlete	Event	Group matches				Quarterfinals	Semifinals	Final / BM	
Athlete	Event	Opposition Score	Opposition Score	Opposition Score	Rank	Opposition Score	Opposition Score	Opposition Score	Rank
Firas Ben Njima; Hassen Nasr; Hazem Dalhoumi; Houssem Mahemli	Men's Tournament	(Egypt) Egypt; L 8–10	(Croatia) Croatia; W 15–14	(Greece) Greece; L 17–13	4	did not advance			11
Hibet Allah Ben Rhouma; Sirine Ben Gara; Marwa Shili; Abir Jdidi Bagane	Women's Tournament	(France) France; L 2–21	(Italy) Egypt; L 12–17	(Egypt) Italy; W 10–8	3	(Spain) Spain; L 6–22	(Serbia) Serbia; W 13–11	(Portugal) Portugal; L 6–13	6

=== Men's 3x3 tournament ===
Group D

Pos	Team	Pld	W	L	PF	PA	PD	Qualification
1	Greece	3	3	0	52	44	+8	Quarterfinals
2	Croatia	3	1	2	47	44	+3	Quarterfinals
3	Egypt	3	1	2	37	43	−6	9–12th place semifinals
4	Tunisia	3	1	2	36	41	−5	

Source: Oran 2022
Rules for classification: 1) Wins; 2) Head-to-head record; 3) Points scored.

30 June
19:00

Report

Egypt	10–8	Tunisia

Sidi M’hamed Public Garden Court, Oran

30 June
22:00

Report

Croatia	14–15	Tunisia

Sidi M’hamed Public Garden Court, Oran

1 July
21:20

Report

Tunisia	13–17	Greece

Sidi M’hamed Public Garden Court, Oran

=== Women's 3x3 tournament ===
Group B

Pos	Team	Pld	W	L	PF	PA	PD	Qualification
1	France	3	3	0	50	21	+29	Quarterfinals
2	Italy	3	2	1	41	29	+12	Quarterfinals
3	Tunisia	3	1	2	24	46	−22	Quarterfinals
4	Egypt	3	0	3	22	41	−19	9–11th place semifinal

Source: Oran 2022
Rules for classification: 1) Wins; 2) Head-to-head record; 3) Points scored.

30 June
18:00

Report

France	21–2	Tunisia
Pts: Droguet, Peytour-Raison 8		Pts: Ben Gara, Jdidi Bagane 1

Sidi M’hamed Public Garden Court, Oran
Referees: Maria Giulia Forni (ITA)

30 June
21:20

Report

Tunisia	12–17	Italy

Sidi M’hamed Public Garden Court, Oran

1 July
20:00

Report

Tunisia	10–8	Egypt

Sidi M’hamed Public Garden Court, Oran

Quarterfinal

2 July
21:20

Report

Portugal	10–13	Turkey

Sidi M’hamed Public Garden Court, Oran

5–8th place semifinals

3 July
18:50

Report

Serbia	11–13	Tunisia

Sidi M’hamed Public Garden Court, Oran

Fifth place game

3 July
20:30

Report

Tunisia	6–13	Portugal

Sidi M’hamed Public Garden Court, Oran

== Boxing ==
Men

Athlete	Event	Round of 16	Quarterfinals	Semifinals	Final	
Athlete	Event	Opposition Result	Opposition Result	Opposition Result	Opposition Result	Rank
Mehdi Hajri	Flyweight (52 kg)	Bye	Omer Ametović (SRB); L 0-3	Did not advance		
Bilel Mhamdi	Featherweight (57 kg)	Bye	Belal Joukhdar (SYR); W 3-0	Oussama Mordjane (ALG); L 0-3	Did not advance	3rd place, bronze medalist(s)
Abdesalem Sassi	Light Welterweight (63 kg)	Shpetim Bajoku (KOS); L 0-3	Did not advance			
Mohamed Aziz Touati	Middleweight (75 kg)	Zine El Abidine Amroug (MAR); L 0-3	Did not advance			

Women

Athlete	Event	Round of 16	Quarterfinals	Semifinals	Final	
Athlete	Event	Opposition Result	Opposition Result	Opposition Result	Opposition Result	Rank
Wafa Hafsi	Minimumweight	—N/a	Bye	Ayşe Çağırır (TUR); L 0-3	Did not advance	3rd place, bronze medalist(s)
Amel Chebbi	Bantamweight	Hatice Akbaş (TUR); L 0-3	Did not advance			
Mariem Homrani	Lightweigh	—N/a	Chaymae Rhaddi (MAR); L 1-2	Did not advance		

== Handball ==
Summary

Team	Event	Group stage					Semifinal	Final / BM / Pl.	
Team	Event	Opposition Score	Opposition Score	Opposition Score	Opposition Score	Rank	Opposition Score	Opposition Score	Rank
Tunisia men's	Men's tournament	Slovenia; W 10–0	Egypt; L 26–30	Italy; L 29–34	Serbia; L 29–35	3	Did not advance	Algeria; W 39–35	5
Tunisia women's	Women's tournament	Algeria; W 20-19	Spain; L 21-28	Croatia; L 26–28	—N/a	3	Did not advance	Turkey; L 35-29	6

=== Men's tournament ===
Group Stage

Pos	Team	Pld	W	D	L	GF	GA	GD	Pts	Qualification
1	Egypt	4	4	0	0	113	89	+24	8	Semifinals
2	Serbia	4	3	0	1	107	97	+10	6	Semifinals
3	Tunisia	4	2	0	2	99	94	+5	4	Fifth place game
4	Italy	4	1	0	3	107	106	+1	2	Seventh place game
5	Slovenia (Note: Slovenia withdrew from the tournament due to several positive COVID-19 cases. The matches were counted as a 10–0 win for the opposing team.)	4	0	0	4	0	40	−40	0	Ninth place game

Source: Oran 2022
Rules for classification: 1) Points; 2) Head-to-head points; 3) Head-to-head goal difference; 4) Head-to-head goals scored; 5) Goal difference; 6) Goals scored; 7) Draw.
Notes:

28 June 2022; 16:00	Tunisia	10–0 (36–34)	Slovenia	24 February Indoor Hall, Arzew; Referees: Díaz-Flores, Pérez (ESP)
28 June 2022; 16:00	Maaref 8	(22–12)	Slatinek-Jovičič 7	24 February Indoor Hall, Arzew; Referees: Díaz-Flores, Pérez (ESP)
28 June 2022; 16:00	5× (suspension)	Report	6× (suspension)	24 February Indoor Hall, Arzew; Referees: Díaz-Flores, Pérez (ESP)

30 June 2022; 12:00	Egypt	30–26	Tunisia	24 February Indoor Hall, Arzew; Referees: Sá, Sá (POR)
30 June 2022; 12:00	Mesilhy 6	(15–13)	Boughanmi 6	24 February Indoor Hall, Arzew; Referees: Sá, Sá (POR)
30 June 2022; 12:00	4× (suspension)	Report	2× (yellow card) 6× (suspension) 1× (red card)	24 February Indoor Hall, Arzew; Referees: Sá, Sá (POR)

1 July 2022; 12:00	Tunisia	34–29	Italy	24 February Indoor Hall, Arzew; Referees: Ilievski, Ilievski (MKD)
1 July 2022; 12:00	Bhar, Boughanmi 8	(18–15)	Prantner 7	24 February Indoor Hall, Arzew; Referees: Ilievski, Ilievski (MKD)
1 July 2022; 12:00	1× (yellow card) 2× (suspension)	Report	1× (yellow card) 5× (suspension)	24 February Indoor Hall, Arzew; Referees: Ilievski, Ilievski (MKD)

2 July 2022; 14:15	Serbia	35–29	Tunisia	24 February Indoor Hall, Arzew; Referees: Díaz-Flores, Pérez (ESP)
2 July 2022; 14:15	Vorkapić 7	(19–13)	Rzig 8	24 February Indoor Hall, Arzew; Referees: Díaz-Flores, Pérez (ESP)
2 July 2022; 14:15	1× (yellow card) 3× (suspension)	Report	1× (yellow card) 4× (suspension)	24 February Indoor Hall, Arzew; Referees: Díaz-Flores, Pérez (ESP)

Fifth place game

4 July 2022
15:00
Tunisia
39–35 (ET)
Algeria
24 February Indoor Hall, Arzew
Referees: Ilievski, Ilievski (MKD)
Boughanmi 8
(13–12)
Naim 10
6× (suspension)
Report
6× (suspension)

FT: 26–26 ET: 5–5, 8–4

=== Women's tournament ===
Group Stage

Pos	Team	Pld	W	D	L	GF	GA	GD	Pts	Qualification
1	Spain	3	3	0	0	85	64	+21	6	Semifinals
2	Croatia	3	2	0	1	82	78	+4	4	Semifinals
3	Tunisia	3	1	0	2	67	75	−8	2	Fifth place game
4	Algeria (H)	3	0	0	3	60	77	−17	0	Seventh place game

Source: Oran 2022
Rules for classification: 1) Points; 2) Head-to-head points; 3) Head-to-head goal difference; 4) Head-to-head goals scored; 5) Goal difference; 6) Goals scored; 7) Draw.
(H) Hosts

30 June 2022; 19:15	Tunisia	26–28	Croatia	El Hachemí Hantaz Hall, Aïn El Turk; Referees: Rodrigues, Pinherio (POR)
30 June 2022; 19:15	Hamrouni 8	(14–17)	Pavlović 12	El Hachemí Hantaz Hall, Aïn El Turk; Referees: Rodrigues, Pinherio (POR)
30 June 2022; 19:15	5× (suspension)	Report	1× (yellow card) 5× (suspension) 1× (red card)	El Hachemí Hantaz Hall, Aïn El Turk; Referees: Rodrigues, Pinherio (POR)

1 July 2022; 19:15	Spain	28–21	Tunisia	El Hachemí Hantaz Hall, Aïn El Turk; Referees: Jakovljević, Kovačević (SRB)
1 July 2022; 19:15	Arrojeria 7	(11–8)	Bouri 4	El Hachemí Hantaz Hall, Aïn El Turk; Referees: Jakovljević, Kovačević (SRB)
1 July 2022; 19:15	1× (yellow card) 3× (suspension)	Report	3× (suspension)	El Hachemí Hantaz Hall, Aïn El Turk; Referees: Jakovljević, Kovačević (SRB)

2 July 2022; 17:00	Algeria	19–20	Tunisia	El Hachemí Hantaz Hall, Aïn El Turk; Referees: Ilievski, Ilievski (MKD)
2 July 2022; 17:00	Makhloufi 7	(9–10)	Masri 7	El Hachemí Hantaz Hall, Aïn El Turk; Referees: Ilievski, Ilievski (MKD)
2 July 2022; 17:00	1× (yellow card) 5× (suspension)	Report	2× (yellow card) 6× (suspension)	El Hachemí Hantaz Hall, Aïn El Turk; Referees: Ilievski, Ilievski (MKD)

Fifth place game

4 July 2022; 12:30	Tunisia	29–35	Turkey	El Hachemí Hantaz Hall, Aïn El Turk; Referees: Rodrigues, Pinherio (POR)
4 July 2022; 12:30	Hachana 6	(14–20)	İskit 6	El Hachemí Hantaz Hall, Aïn El Turk; Referees: Rodrigues, Pinherio (POR)
4 July 2022; 12:30	4× (suspension)	Report	1× (yellow card) 5× (suspension)	El Hachemí Hantaz Hall, Aïn El Turk; Referees: Rodrigues, Pinherio (POR)

== Judo ==
Tunisia competed in judo.

Men

Athlete	Event	Round of 16	Quarterfinals	Semifinals	Repechage 1	Repechage 2	Final / BM	
Athlete	Event	Opposition Result	Opposition Result	Opposition Result	Opposition Result	Opposition Result	Opposition Result	Rank
Fraj Dhouibi	60 kg	Bye	Maxime Merlin (FRA); W 10-00	Youssry Samy (EGY); W 01-00	Bye		Francisco Garrigós (ESP); L 00-10	2nd place, silver medalist(s)
Aleddine Ben Chalbi	73 kg	Abdulati Abushagur (LBA); W 10-00	Manuel Lombardo (ITA); W 01-00	Hassan Doukkali (MAR); L 00-10	Bye		Michail Tsoutlasvili (GRE); W 11-00	3rd place, bronze medalist(s)
Wajdi Hajji	81 kg	Bye	Tizie Gnamien (FRA); L 00-01	Did not advance	Bye	Božidar Vučurević (BIH); L 00-10	Did not advance	
Abdelaziz Ben Ammar	90 kg	Toni Miletić (BIH); L 00-10	Did not advance		Abderrahmane Benamadi (ALG); L 00-10	Did not advance		
Koussay Ben Ghares	100 kg	Bye	Joris Agbegnenou (FRA); L 00-01	Did not advance	Diogo Brites (POR); W 11-00	Mert Şişmanlar (TUR); L 00-01	Did not advance	
Wahib Hdiouech	+100 kg	Bye	Lorenzo Agro Sylvan (ITA); L 00-10	Did not advance	Panagiotis Papanikolaou (GRE); W 10-00	Münir Ertuğ (TUR); W 10-00	Guerman Andreev (FRA); W 01-00	3rd place, bronze medalist(s)

Women

Athlete	Event	Round of 16	Quarterfinals	Semifinals	Repechage 1	Repechage 2	Final / BM	
Athlete	Event	Opposition Result	Opposition Result	Opposition Result	Opposition Result	Opposition Result	Opposition Result	Rank
Oumaima Bedioui	48 kg	Bye	Sofia Petitto (ITA); L 00-10	Did not advance	Imene Rezzoug (ALG); W 11-00	Erza Muminoviq (KOS); W 10-00	Mireia Lapuerta Comas (ESP); W 01-00	3rd place, bronze medalist(s)
Meriem Bjaoui	63 kg	Bye	Sarah Harachi (MAR); L 00-11	did not advance	Nicolle D'Isanto (ITA); L 00-10	—N/a	did not advance	
Nihel Landolsi	70 kg	Bye	Elisavet Teltsidou (GRE); W 01-00	Lara Cvjetko (CRO); W 10-00	Bye		Ai Tsunoda (ESP); L 00-10	2nd place, silver medalist(s)
Nihel Cheikh Rouhou	+78 kg	Bye	Asya Tavano (ITA); W 10-00	Coralie Hayme (FRA); W 01-00	did not advance	—N/a	Kayra Sayit (TUR); L 00-01	2nd place, silver medalist(s)

== Karate ==
Tunisia competed in karate.

Men

Athlete	Event	Round of 16	Quarterfinals	Semifinals	Repechage	Final / BM	
Athlete	Event	Opposition Result	Opposition Result	Opposition Result	Opposition Result	Opposition Result	Rank
Mohamed Rfigui	60 kg	Eray Şamdan (TUR); L 0–0	did not advance		Pavle Dujaković (BIH); L 1–2	did not advance	
Ramez Bouallagui	75 kg	Thanh-Liêm Lê (FRA); L 1–4	did not advance				
Thamer Slimani	84 kg	José Ibáñez (ESP); L 1–4	did not advance				
Houssem Eddine Choiya	+84 kg	Anđelo Kvesić (CRO); L 3–5	did not advance		Georgios Tzanos (GRE); W 5–0	Rijad Džuho (BIH); L 1–2	4

Women

Athlete	Event	Round of 16	Quarterfinals	Semifinals	Repechage	Final / BM	
Athlete	Event	Opposition Result	Opposition Result	Opposition Result	Opposition Result	Opposition Result	Rank
Islem Ben Hassen	50 kg	Erminia Perfetto (ITA); W 1–0	Serap Özçelik (TUR); L 0–0	did not advance			
Shirine Zarati	55 kg	Bye	Tuba Yakan (TUR); L 0–8	did not advance			
Wafa Mahjoub	61 kg	Nejra Sipović (BIH); W 1–0	Tamara Živković (SRB); W 8–2	Maeva Dario (FRA); W 8–1	Bye	Chaima Midi (ALG); L 2–3	2nd place, silver medalist(s)
Chehinez Jemi	+68 kg	Fortesa Orana (KOS); W 6–3	Loubna Mekdas (ALG); W 2–0	Milena Jovanović (MNE); L 0–0	Bye	María Torres (ESP); W 3–2	3rd place, bronze medalist(s)

== Swimming ==
Men

Athlete	Event	Heat		Final	
Athlete	Event	Time	Rank	Time	Rank
Mohamed Lagili	200 m freestyle	1:53.46	11	did not advance	
Mohamed Lagili	400 m freestyle	DNS		did not advance	
Ahmed Jaouadi	400 m freestyle	DNS		did not advance	
Ahmed Jaouadi	1500 m freestyle	15:35.04	6 Q	15:41.75	8

== Taekwondo ==
Athlete	Event	Round of 16	Quarterfinals	Semifinals	Final	
Athlete	Event	Opposition Result	Opposition Result	Opposition Result	Opposition Result	Rank
Firas Katoussi	Men's 80 kg	Islam Guetfaya (ALG); W 26^{PTG}–5	Nedžad Husić (BIH); W 22–4	Seif Eissa (EGY); L 5–7	Did not advance	3rd place, bronze medalist(s)
Ikram Dhahri	Women's 49 kg	Džejla Makaš (BIH); W 16–2	Bruna Duvančić (CRO); L 9–11	Did not advance		

== Volleyball ==
Team	Event	Group stage				Quarter-final	Semifinal	Final / BM / Pl.	
Team	Event	Opposition Score	Opposition Score	Opposition Score	Rank	Opposition Score	Opposition Score	Opposition Score	Rank
Tunisia men's	Men's tournament	Serbia; W 3-0	Spain; L 0-3	Croatia; W 3-2	3 Q	France; L 1-3	Egypt; W 3-1	Turkey; L 1-3	6
Tunisia women's	Women's tournament	Greece; L 0-3	North Macedonia; W 3-0	Egypt; L 1-3	3 Q	Turkey; L 0-3	Egypt; L 1-3	Croatia; W 0-3	8

== Weightlifting ==
Men

Athlete	Event	Snatch		Clean & jerk	
Athlete	Event	Result	Rank	Result	Rank
Amine Bouhijbha	61 kg	116	3rd place, bronze medalist(s)	150	3rd place, bronze medalist(s)
Karem Ben Hnia	73 kg	147	3rd place, bronze medalist(s)	185	1st place, gold medalist(s)
Aymen Bacha	102 kg	174	2nd place, silver medalist(s)	210	1st place, gold medalist(s)

Women

Athlete	Event	Snatch		Clean & jerk	
Athlete	Event	Result	Rank	Result	Rank
Zahra Chihi	49 kg	~~74~~	DNF	—	—
Ghofrane Belkhir	59 kg	91	4	115	1st place, gold medalist(s)
Jawaher Gesmi	71 kg	84	12	114	7
