= North Macedonia at the 2022 Mediterranean Games =

- IOC code: MKD
- NOC: Olympic Committee of North Macedonia

in Oran, Algeria 25 June 2022 – 6 July 2022
- Competitors: 79 in 6 sports
- Medals Ranked 21st: Gold 1 Silver 0 Bronze 2 Total 3

Mediterranean Games appearances
- 2013; 2018; 2022

Other related appearances
- Yugoslavia (1951–1991)

North Macedonia competed at the 2022 Mediterranean Games in Oran, Algeria from 25 June to 6 July 2022.

== Medals ==
Medals by sport
Sport	1st place, gold medalist(s)	2nd place, silver medalist(s)	3rd place, bronze medalist(s)	Total	Rank
Wrestling	1	0	1	2	7
Taekwondo	0	0	1	1	9

== Medalists ==
Medal	Name	Sport	Event	Date
Gold	Magomedgaji Nurov	Wrestling	Men's Freestyle 97 Kg	28 June
Bronze	Vladimir Egorov	Wrestling	Men's Freestyle 65 Kg	28 June
Bronze	Dejan Georgievski	Taekwondo	Men's Heavyweight (+80 kg)	3 July

== Handball ==
Summary

Team	Event	Group stage					Semifinal	Final / BM / Pl.	
Team	Event	Opposition Score	Opposition Score	Opposition Score	Opposition Score	Rank	Opposition Score	Opposition Score	Rank
North Macedonia men's	Men's tournament	Greece; W 31-21	Algeria; D 24-24	Spain; L 22-31	Turkey; W 31-22	2	Egypt; L 20-34	Serbia; L 29-34	4
North Macedonia women's	Women's tournament	Turkey; L 27-34	Serbia; L 18-26	Portugal; L 17-19	—N/a	4	—N/a	Algeria; W 31-23	7

=== Men's tournament ===
Group Stage

Pos	Team	Pld	W	D	L	GF	GA	GD	Pts	Qualification
1	Spain	4	4	0	0	154	81	+73	8	Semifinals
2	North Macedonia	4	2	1	1	116	98	+18	5	Semifinals
3	Algeria (H)	4	2	1	1	110	107	+3	5	Fifth place game
4	Turkey	4	1	0	3	96	135	−39	2	Seventh place game
5	Greece	4	0	0	4	93	148	−55	0	Ninth place game

Source: Oran 2022
Rules for classification: 1) Points; 2) Head-to-head points; 3) Head-to-head goal difference; 4) Head-to-head goals scored; 5) Goal difference; 6) Goals scored; 7) Draw.
(H) Hosts

27 June 2022; 20:00	North Macedonia	39–21	Greece	24 February Indoor Hall, Arzew; Referees: Jakovljević, Sando Kovačević (SRB)
27 June 2022; 20:00	Serafimov 7	(20–13)	Pagiatis 5	24 February Indoor Hall, Arzew; Referees: Jakovljević, Sando Kovačević (SRB)
27 June 2022; 20:00	1× (suspension)	Report	1× (yellow card) 3× (suspension) 1× (red card)	24 February Indoor Hall, Arzew; Referees: Jakovljević, Sando Kovačević (SRB)

28 June 2022; 18:00	Algeria	24–24	North Macedonia	24 February Indoor Hall, Arzew; Referees: Rodrigues, Pinherio (POR)
28 June 2022; 18:00	Saker 7	(15–15)	Serafimov 5	24 February Indoor Hall, Arzew; Referees: Rodrigues, Pinherio (POR)
28 June 2022; 18:00	5× (suspension) 1× (red card)	Report	2× (yellow card) 5× (suspension)	24 February Indoor Hall, Arzew; Referees: Rodrigues, Pinherio (POR)

30 June 2022; 17:00	North Macedonia	22–31	Spain	24 February Indoor Hall, Arzew; Referees: Sando Kovačević, Jakovljević (SRB)
30 June 2022; 17:00	Serafimov 8	(8–14)	three players 4	24 February Indoor Hall, Arzew; Referees: Sando Kovačević, Jakovljević (SRB)
30 June 2022; 17:00	2× (yellow card) 3× (suspension)	Report	3× (suspension)	24 February Indoor Hall, Arzew; Referees: Sando Kovačević, Jakovljević (SRB)

1 July 2022; 19:15	Turkey	22–31	North Macedonia	24 February Indoor Hall, Arzew; Referees: Díaz-Flores, Pérez (ESP)
1 July 2022; 19:15	Durmaz 5	(12–13)	Petkovski 11	24 February Indoor Hall, Arzew; Referees: Díaz-Flores, Pérez (ESP)
1 July 2022; 19:15	1× (yellow card) 8× (suspension) 2× (red card)	Report	3× (suspension)	24 February Indoor Hall, Arzew; Referees: Díaz-Flores, Pérez (ESP)

Semi-Final

4 July 2022; 13:00	Egypt	34–20	North Macedonia	Miloud Hadefi Complex Omnisport Arena, Bir El Djir; Referees: Ghouarda, Deche (ALG)
4 July 2022; 13:00	Sanad 8	(16–10)	four players 4	Miloud Hadefi Complex Omnisport Arena, Bir El Djir; Referees: Ghouarda, Deche (ALG)
4 July 2022; 13:00	1× (yellow card) 4× (suspension)	Report	3× (yellow card) 4× (suspension)	Miloud Hadefi Complex Omnisport Arena, Bir El Djir; Referees: Ghouarda, Deche (ALG)

Bronze Medal Match

6 July 2022; 11:30	North Macedonia	29–34	Serbia	Miloud Hadefi Complex Omnisport Arena, Bir El Djir; Referees: Deche, Ghouarda (ALG)
6 July 2022; 11:30	Pe. Atanasijevikj, Petrov 5	(13–15)	Vorkapić 6	Miloud Hadefi Complex Omnisport Arena, Bir El Djir; Referees: Deche, Ghouarda (ALG)
6 July 2022; 11:30	7× (suspension)	Report	1× (yellow card) 13× (suspension) 1× (red card)	Miloud Hadefi Complex Omnisport Arena, Bir El Djir; Referees: Deche, Ghouarda (ALG)

=== Women's tournament ===
Group Stage

Pos	Team	Pld	W	D	L	GF	GA	GD	Pts	Qualification
1	Serbia	3	3	0	0	78	64	+14	6	Semifinals
2	Portugal	3	2	0	1	69	64	+5	4	Semifinals
3	Turkey	3	1	0	2	86	88	−2	2	Fifth place game
4	North Macedonia	3	0	0	3	62	79	−17	0	Seventh place game

Source: Oran 2022
Rules for classification: 1) Points; 2) Head-to-head points; 3) Head-to-head goal difference; 4) Head-to-head goals scored; 5) Goal difference; 6) Goals scored; 7) Draw.

30 June 2022; 12:00	North Macedonia	27–34	Turkey	El Hachemí Hantaz Hall, Aïn El Turk; Referees: Deche, Guarda (ALG)
30 June 2022; 12:00	Kiprijanovska 6	(16–19)	Türkoglu 8	El Hachemí Hantaz Hall, Aïn El Turk; Referees: Deche, Guarda (ALG)
30 June 2022; 12:00	2× (suspension)	Report	4× (yellow card) 6× (suspension)	El Hachemí Hantaz Hall, Aïn El Turk; Referees: Deche, Guarda (ALG)

1 July 2022; 14:15	North Macedonia	18–26	Serbia	El Hachemí Hantaz Hall, Aïn El Turk; Referees: Hamidi, Belkhiri (ALG)
1 July 2022; 14:15	Dukoska, Kiprijanovska 5	(8–10)	Jovović 8	El Hachemí Hantaz Hall, Aïn El Turk; Referees: Hamidi, Belkhiri (ALG)
1 July 2022; 14:15	1× (yellow card) 6× (suspension)	Report	2× (yellow card) 5× (suspension)	El Hachemí Hantaz Hall, Aïn El Turk; Referees: Hamidi, Belkhiri (ALG)

2 July 2022; 14:15	Portugal	19–17	North Macedonia	El Hachemí Hantaz Hall, Aïn El Turk; Referees: Ghoul, Chergui (ALG)
2 July 2022; 14:15	Sabino 8	(13–11)	Dukovska 10	El Hachemí Hantaz Hall, Aïn El Turk; Referees: Ghoul, Chergui (ALG)
2 July 2022; 14:15	1× (yellow card) 3× (suspension)	Report	1× (yellow card) 5× (suspension)	El Hachemí Hantaz Hall, Aïn El Turk; Referees: Ghoul, Chergui (ALG)

Seventh place game

4 July 2022; 10:00	Algeria	23–31	North Macedonia	El Hachemí Hantaz Hall, Aïn El Turk; Referees: Díaz-Flores, Pérez (ESP)
4 July 2022; 10:00	Zazai 7	(12–17)	Dukoska 10	El Hachemí Hantaz Hall, Aïn El Turk; Referees: Díaz-Flores, Pérez (ESP)
4 July 2022; 10:00	5× (suspension)	Report	3× (suspension)	El Hachemí Hantaz Hall, Aïn El Turk; Referees: Díaz-Flores, Pérez (ESP)

== Karate ==
North Macedonia competed in karate.

Men

Athlete	Event	Round of 16	Quarterfinals	Semifinals	Repechage	Final / BM	
Athlete	Event	Opposition Result	Opposition Result	Opposition Result	Opposition Result	Opposition Result	Rank
Petar Zaborski	75 kg	Enes Garibović (CRO); L 0–1	did not advance				
Petar Spasenovski	84 kg	Nabil Ech-Chaabi (MAR); L 0–8	did not advance				

Women

Athlete	Event	Round of 16	Quarterfinals	Semifinals	Repechage	Final / BM	
Athlete	Event	Opposition Result	Opposition Result	Opposition Result	Opposition Result	Opposition Result	Rank
Simona Zaborska	61 kg	Tamara Živković (SRB); L 3–3	did not advance				

== Swimming ==
Men

Athlete	Event	Heat		Final	
Athlete	Event	Time	Rank	Time	Rank
Andrej Stojanovski	50 m backstroke	27.71	17	did not advance	
Andrej Stojanovski	200 m breaststroke	2:22.42	14	did not advance	

== Taekwondo ==
North Macedonia won one medal in Taekwondo.

Men

Athlete	Event	Round of 16	Quarterfinals	Semifinals	Final	Rank
Marko Avramoski	58 kg	Saidi Attoui (ALG); L 14-34	did not advance			
Filip Dodevski	80 kg	Hüseyin Kartal (TUR); L 13-24	did not advance			
Dejan Georgievski	+80 kg	Bye	Ahmad Mohamed (EGY); W 20-18	Ayoub Bassel (MAR); L IRM	did not advance	3rd place, bronze medalist(s)

Women

Athlete	Event	Round of 16	Quarterfinals	Semifinals	Final	Rank
Sanja Popovska	57 kg	Ashrakat Darwish (EGY); L 5-7	did not advance			
Anamarija Georgievska	67 kg	Zorana Sandić (BIH); W 13-5	Matea Jelić (CRO); L 2-28	did not advance		

== Wrestling ==
North Macedonia won two medals in wrestling.
