= Handball at the 2022 Mediterranean Games =

Handball tournaments

- Venue: Miloud Hadefi Complex Omnisport Arena; 24 February Indoor Hall; El Hachemí Hantaz Hall
- Dates: 26 June – 6 July
- Nations: 12
- Teams: 10 (men); 8 (women)

Champions
- Men: Spain
- Women: Spain

The handball tournaments at the 2022 Mediterranean Games in Oran took place between 26 June and 6 July 2022.

== Medal summary ==
=== Events ===
Event	Gold	Silver	Bronze
Men	Spain; Antonio Bazán; Daniel Fernández; Josep Folqués; Jaime Gallego; Imanol Garciandia; Sergey Hernández; Ander Izquierdo; Alberto Martín; Asier Nieto; Pol Valera; Ian Tarrafeta; Chema Márquez; Miguel Martínez; Kauldi Odriozola; Roberto Rodríguez; Jorge Serrano	Egypt; Mohab Abdelhak; Abdelrahman Abdou; Mohamed Abousalem; Ahmed El-Ahmar; Seif El-Deraa; Yehia El-Deraa; Ibrahim El-Masry; Mohamed El-Tayar; Omar El-Wakil; Karim Hendawy; Hassan Kaddah; Ahmed Mesilhy; Ali Mohamed; Ahmed Nasralla; Akram Saad; Mohammad Sanad	Serbia; Milan Bomaštar; Uroš Borzaš; Milan Golubović; Miloš Grozdanić; Todor Jandrić; Uroš Kojadinović; Milan Milić; Marko Milosavljević; Uroš Pavlovčič; Stefan Petrić; Ivan Popović; Veljko Popovic; Mladen Šotić; Andrej Trnavac; Marko Vignjević; Vukašin Vorkapić
Women	Spain; Maddi Aalla; Elba Álvarez; Carmen Campos; Elena Cuadrado; Esther Arrojería; Clara Gascó; Kaba Gassama; María Gomes; Laura Hernández; June Loidi; Seynabou Mbengue; Alba Spugnini; Paula Valdivia Monserrat; Sara Valero; Ona Vegué; Nicole Wiggins	Croatia; Tina Barišić; Josipa Bebek; Lucija Bešen; Ema Guskić; Tena Japundža; Lana Jarak; Ana Malec; Katarina Pavlović; Tena Petika; Stela Posavec; Sara Šenvald; Andrea Šimara; Antonija Tucaković; Mia Tupek; Nika Vojnović	Serbia; Isidora Bogunović; Katarina Bojičić; Nataša Ćetković; Jelena Đurašinović; Helena Inđić; Marija Jovanović; Jovana Jovović; Lana Mijailović; Edita Nuković; Una Obrenović; Dunja Radević; Marija Simić; Srna Sukur; Dunja Tabak; Teodora Veličković; Aleksandra Vukajlović

== Participating nations ==
Men

Federation	Nation
CAHB Africa	Algeria; Egypt; Tunisia
EHF Europe	Greece; Italy; North Macedonia; Serbia; Slovenia; Spain; Turkey

Women

Federation	Nation
CAHB Africa	Algeria; Tunisia
EHF Europe	Croatia; North Macedonia; Portugal; Serbia; Spain; Turkey
