= Boules at the Mediterranean Games =

Boules is one of the sports at the quadrennial Mediterranean Games competition. It has been a sport in the program of the Mediterranean Games since its inception in 1997.

== Editions ==
Games	Year	Host	Winner of the medal table	Second in the medal table	Third in the medal table
XIII	1997	(Italy) Bari	Italy	France	Tunisia
XIV	2001	(Tunisia) Tunis	France	Spain	Slovenia
XV	2005	(Spain) Almería	France	Italy	Tunisia
XVI	2009	(Italy) Pescara	Italy	France	Tunisia
XVII	2013	(Turkey) Mersin	Italy	France	Turkey
XVIII	2018	(Spain) Tarragona	Tunisia	Croatia	France
XIX	2022	(Algeria) Oran	Turkey	France	Italy
XX	2026	(Italy) Taranto	Italy	France	San Marino

== All-time medal table ==
Updated after the 2026 Mediterranean Games

Rank	Nation	Gold	Silver	Bronze	Total
1	Italy (ITA)	19	12	14	45
2	France (FRA)	17	9	11	37
3	Tunisia (TUN)	9	4	7	20
4	Turkey (TUR)	6	7	6	19
5	San Marino (SMR)	4	7	4	15
6	Slovenia (SLO)	4	3	5	12
7	Croatia (CRO)	3	8	2	13
8	Spain (ESP)	2	10	3	15
9	Montenegro (MNE)	1	1	1	3
10	Algeria (ALG)	0	2	6	8
11	Malta (MLT)	0	1	2	3
11	Morocco (MAR)	0	1	2	3
13	Serbia (SRB)	0	0	2	2
14	Libya (LBA)	0	0	1	1
Totals (14 entries)		65	65	66	196
