= Handball at the 2022 Mediterranean Games – Men's tournament =

Men's handball at the 2022 Mediterranean Games
Tournament details
- Host country: Algeria
- Venues: 2 (in 2 host cities)
- Dates: 26 June – 6 July
- Teams: 10 (from 2 confederations)

Final positions
- Champions: Spain (2nd title)
- Runners-up: Egypt
- Third place: Serbia
- Fourth place: North Macedonia

The men's handball tournament at the 2022 Mediterranean Games was held from 26 June to 6 July in Arzew and Bir El Djir.

== Preliminary round ==
All times are local (UTC+1).

=== Group A ===
| Pos | Team | Pld | W | D | L | GF | GA | GD | Pts | Qualification |
|---|---|---|---|---|---|---|---|---|---|---|
| 1 | Egypt | 4 | 4 | 0 | 0 | 113 | 89 | +24 | 8 | Semifinals |
| 2 | Serbia | 4 | 3 | 0 | 1 | 107 | 97 | +10 | 6 | Semifinals |
| 3 | Tunisia | 4 | 2 | 0 | 2 | 99 | 94 | +5 | 4 | Fifth place game |
| 4 | Italy | 4 | 1 | 0 | 3 | 107 | 106 | +1 | 2 | Seventh place game |
| 5 | Slovenia (Note: Slovenia withdrew from the tournament due to several positive COVID-19 cases. The matches were counted as a 10–0 win for the opposing team.) | 4 | 0 | 0 | 4 | 0 | 40 | −40 | 0 | Ninth place game |

Source: Oran 2022
Rules for classification: 1) Points; 2) Head-to-head points; 3) Head-to-head goal difference; 4) Head-to-head goals scored; 5) Goal difference; 6) Goals scored; 7) Draw.
Notes:

| 27 June 2022; 14:00 | Slovenia | 0–10 (27–31) | Serbia | 24 February Indoor Hall, Arzew; Referees: Deche, Guarda (ALG) |
| 27 June 2022; 14:00 | Pipp 5 | (15–15) | Grozdanić 8 | 24 February Indoor Hall, Arzew; Referees: Deche, Guarda (ALG) |
| 27 June 2022; 14:00 | 1× (yellow card) 2× (suspension) | Report | 2× (yellow card) 9× (suspension) 1× (red card) | 24 February Indoor Hall, Arzew; Referees: Deche, Guarda (ALG) |

| 27 June 2022; 16:00 | Egypt | 38–35 | Italy | 24 February Indoor Hall, Arzew; Referees: Ilievski, Ilievski (MKD) |
| 27 June 2022; 16:00 | Kaddah 9 | (20–14) | Parisini 8 | 24 February Indoor Hall, Arzew; Referees: Ilievski, Ilievski (MKD) |
| 27 June 2022; 16:00 | 3× (suspension) | Report | 1× (suspension) | 24 February Indoor Hall, Arzew; Referees: Ilievski, Ilievski (MKD) |

| 28 June 2022; 14:00 | Serbia | 28–35 | Egypt | 24 February Indoor Hall, Arzew; Referees: Sá, Sá (POR) |
| 28 June 2022; 14:00 | Grozdanić 7 | (12–16) | El-Ahmar 6 | 24 February Indoor Hall, Arzew; Referees: Sá, Sá (POR) |
| 28 June 2022; 14:00 | 2× (yellow card) 6× (suspension) | Report | 3× (suspension) 1× | 24 February Indoor Hall, Arzew; Referees: Sá, Sá (POR) |

| 28 June 2022; 16:00 | Tunisia | 10–0 (36–34) | Slovenia | 24 February Indoor Hall, Arzew; Referees: Díaz-Flores, Pérez (ESP) |
| 28 June 2022; 16:00 | Maaref 8 | (22–12) | Slatinek-Jovičič 7 | 24 February Indoor Hall, Arzew; Referees: Díaz-Flores, Pérez (ESP) |
| 28 June 2022; 16:00 | 5× (suspension) | Report | 6× (suspension) | 24 February Indoor Hall, Arzew; Referees: Díaz-Flores, Pérez (ESP) |

| 30 June 2022; 12:00 | Egypt | 30–26 | Tunisia | 24 February Indoor Hall, Arzew; Referees: Sá, Sá (POR) |
| 30 June 2022; 12:00 | Mesilhy 6 | (15–13) | Boughanmi 6 | 24 February Indoor Hall, Arzew; Referees: Sá, Sá (POR) |
| 30 June 2022; 12:00 | 4× (suspension) | Report | 2× (yellow card) 6× (suspension) 1× (red card) | 24 February Indoor Hall, Arzew; Referees: Sá, Sá (POR) |

| 30 June 2022; 14:00 | Italy | 33–34 | Serbia | 24 February Indoor Hall, Arzew; Referees: Ghoul, Chergui (ALG) |
| 30 June 2022; 14:00 | Arcieri 7 | (16–15) | Milić 8 | 24 February Indoor Hall, Arzew; Referees: Ghoul, Chergui (ALG) |
| 30 June 2022; 14:00 | 1× (suspension) | Report | 2× (yellow card) 6× (suspension) 1× (red card) | 24 February Indoor Hall, Arzew; Referees: Ghoul, Chergui (ALG) |

| 1 July 2022; 12:00 | Tunisia | 34–29 | Italy | 24 February Indoor Hall, Arzew; Referees: Ilievski, Ilievski (MKD) |
| 1 July 2022; 12:00 | Bhar, Boughanmi 8 | (18–15) | Prantner 7 | 24 February Indoor Hall, Arzew; Referees: Ilievski, Ilievski (MKD) |
| 1 July 2022; 12:00 | 1× (yellow card) 2× (suspension) | Report | 1× (yellow card) 5× (suspension) | 24 February Indoor Hall, Arzew; Referees: Ilievski, Ilievski (MKD) |

| Cancelled | Slovenia | 0–10 | Egypt | 24 February Indoor Hall, Arzew |

| Cancelled | Italy | 10–0 | Slovenia | 24 February Indoor Hall, Arzew |

| 2 July 2022; 14:15 | Serbia | 35–29 | Tunisia | 24 February Indoor Hall, Arzew; Referees: Díaz-Flores, Pérez (ESP) |
| 2 July 2022; 14:15 | Vorkapić 7 | (19–13) | Rzig 8 | 24 February Indoor Hall, Arzew; Referees: Díaz-Flores, Pérez (ESP) |
| 2 July 2022; 14:15 | 1× (yellow card) 3× (suspension) | Report | 1× (yellow card) 4× (suspension) | 24 February Indoor Hall, Arzew; Referees: Díaz-Flores, Pérez (ESP) |

=== Group B ===
| Pos | Team | Pld | W | D | L | GF | GA | GD | Pts | Qualification |
|---|---|---|---|---|---|---|---|---|---|---|
| 1 | Spain | 4 | 4 | 0 | 0 | 154 | 81 | +73 | 8 | Semifinals |
| 2 | North Macedonia | 4 | 2 | 1 | 1 | 116 | 98 | +18 | 5 | Semifinals |
| 3 | Algeria (H) | 4 | 2 | 1 | 1 | 110 | 107 | +3 | 5 | Fifth place game |
| 4 | Turkey | 4 | 1 | 0 | 3 | 96 | 135 | −39 | 2 | Seventh place game |
| 5 | Greece | 4 | 0 | 0 | 4 | 93 | 148 | −55 | 0 | Ninth place game |

Source: Oran 2022
Rules for classification: 1) Points; 2) Head-to-head points; 3) Head-to-head goal difference; 4) Head-to-head goals scored; 5) Goal difference; 6) Goals scored; 7) Draw.
(H) Hosts

| 27 June 2022; 18:00 | Turkey | 27–32 | Algeria | 24 February Indoor Hall, Arzew; Referees: Sá, Sá (POR) |
| 27 June 2022; 18:00 | Pehlivan 5 | (14–15) | Berkous 6 | 24 February Indoor Hall, Arzew; Referees: Sá, Sá (POR) |
| 27 June 2022; 18:00 | 5× (suspension) 2× (red card) | Report | 1× (yellow card) 5× (suspension) 1× (red card) | 24 February Indoor Hall, Arzew; Referees: Sá, Sá (POR) |

| 27 June 2022; 20:00 | North Macedonia | 39–21 | Greece | 24 February Indoor Hall, Arzew; Referees: Jakovljević, Sando Kovačević (SRB) |
| 27 June 2022; 20:00 | Serafimov 7 | (20–13) | Pagiatis 5 | 24 February Indoor Hall, Arzew; Referees: Jakovljević, Sando Kovačević (SRB) |
| 27 June 2022; 20:00 | 1× (suspension) | Report | 1× (yellow card) 3× (suspension) 1× (red card) | 24 February Indoor Hall, Arzew; Referees: Jakovljević, Sando Kovačević (SRB) |

| 28 June 2022; 18:00 | Algeria | 24–24 | North Macedonia | 24 February Indoor Hall, Arzew; Referees: Rodrigues, Pinherio (POR) |
| 28 June 2022; 18:00 | Saker 7 | (15–15) | Serafimov 5 | 24 February Indoor Hall, Arzew; Referees: Rodrigues, Pinherio (POR) |
| 28 June 2022; 18:00 | 5× (suspension) 1× (red card) | Report | 2× (yellow card) 5× (suspension) | 24 February Indoor Hall, Arzew; Referees: Rodrigues, Pinherio (POR) |

| 28 June 2022; 20:00 | Spain | 46–19 | Turkey | 24 February Indoor Hall, Arzew; Referees: Hamidi, Belkhiri (ALG) |
| 28 June 2022; 20:00 | Serrano 7 | (26–7) | Durmaz, Pehlivan 4 | 24 February Indoor Hall, Arzew; Referees: Hamidi, Belkhiri (ALG) |
| 28 June 2022; 20:00 | 2× (suspension) | Report | 1× (yellow card) 4× (suspension) | 24 February Indoor Hall, Arzew; Referees: Hamidi, Belkhiri (ALG) |

| 30 June 2022; 17:00 | North Macedonia | 22–31 | Spain | 24 February Indoor Hall, Arzew; Referees: Sando Kovačević, Jakovljević (SRB) |
| 30 June 2022; 17:00 | Serafimov 8 | (8–14) | three players 4 | 24 February Indoor Hall, Arzew; Referees: Sando Kovačević, Jakovljević (SRB) |
| 30 June 2022; 17:00 | 2× (yellow card) 3× (suspension) | Report | 3× (suspension) | 24 February Indoor Hall, Arzew; Referees: Sando Kovačević, Jakovljević (SRB) |

| 30 June 2022; 19:00 | Greece | 25–35 | Algeria | 24 February Indoor Hall, Arzew; Referees: Díaz-Flores, Pérez (ESP) |
| 30 June 2022; 19:00 | Dikaioulias 4 | (13–17) | Naïm 7 | 24 February Indoor Hall, Arzew; Referees: Díaz-Flores, Pérez (ESP) |
| 30 June 2022; 19:00 | 4× (suspension) | Report | 1× (yellow card) 2× (suspension) | 24 February Indoor Hall, Arzew; Referees: Díaz-Flores, Pérez (ESP) |

| 1 July 2022; 17:00 | Spain | 46–21 | Greece | 24 February Indoor Hall, Arzew; Referees: Rodrigues, Pinherio (POR) |
| 1 July 2022; 17:00 | Folqués, Odriozola 6 | (24–10) | three players 4 | 24 February Indoor Hall, Arzew; Referees: Rodrigues, Pinherio (POR) |
| 1 July 2022; 17:00 | 2× (suspension) | Report | 2× (suspension) | 24 February Indoor Hall, Arzew; Referees: Rodrigues, Pinherio (POR) |

| 1 July 2022; 19:15 | Turkey | 22–31 | North Macedonia | 24 February Indoor Hall, Arzew; Referees: Díaz-Flores, Pérez (ESP) |
| 1 July 2022; 19:15 | Durmaz 5 | (12–13) | Petkovski 11 | 24 February Indoor Hall, Arzew; Referees: Díaz-Flores, Pérez (ESP) |
| 1 July 2022; 19:15 | 1× (yellow card) 8× (suspension) 2× (red card) | Report | 3× (suspension) | 24 February Indoor Hall, Arzew; Referees: Díaz-Flores, Pérez (ESP) |

| 2 July 2022; 17:00 | Greece | 26–28 | Turkey | 24 February Indoor Hall, Arzew; Referees: Farsi, Kahouadji (ALG) |
| 2 July 2022; 17:00 | Stefanitsis 4 | (14–11) | Şirin 7 | 24 February Indoor Hall, Arzew; Referees: Farsi, Kahouadji (ALG) |
| 2 July 2022; 17:00 | 6× (suspension) | Report | 2× (yellow card) 3× (suspension) 1× (red card) | 24 February Indoor Hall, Arzew; Referees: Farsi, Kahouadji (ALG) |

| 2 July 2022; 19:15 | Algeria | 19–31 | Spain | 24 February Indoor Hall, Arzew; Referees: Sá, Sá (POR) |
| 2 July 2022; 19:15 | Saker 4 | (7–22) | Márquez 5 | 24 February Indoor Hall, Arzew; Referees: Sá, Sá (POR) |
| 2 July 2022; 19:15 | 1× (yellow card) 2× (suspension) | Report | 2× (suspension) | 24 February Indoor Hall, Arzew; Referees: Sá, Sá (POR) |

== Playoffs ==
=== Bracket ===
Semifinals
4 July
Egypt | 34
North Macedonia | 20
4 July
Spain | 42
Serbia | 38

Gold medal
6 July
Egypt | 27
Spain | 28
Bronze medal
6 July
North Macedonia | 29
Serbia | 34

=== Semifinals ===
| 4 July 2022; 13:00 | Egypt | 34–20 | North Macedonia | Miloud Hadefi Complex Omnisport Arena, Bir El Djir; Referees: Ghouarda, Deche (ALG) |
| 4 July 2022; 13:00 | Sanad 8 | (16–10) | four players 4 | Miloud Hadefi Complex Omnisport Arena, Bir El Djir; Referees: Ghouarda, Deche (ALG) |
| 4 July 2022; 13:00 | 1× (yellow card) 4× (suspension) | Report | 3× (yellow card) 4× (suspension) | Miloud Hadefi Complex Omnisport Arena, Bir El Djir; Referees: Ghouarda, Deche (ALG) |

| 4 July 2022; 18:00 | Spain | 42–38 | Serbia | Miloud Hadefi Complex Omnisport Arena, Bir El Djir; Referees: Belkhiri, Hamidi (ALG) |
| 4 July 2022; 18:00 | three players 6 | (22–21) | three players 7 | Miloud Hadefi Complex Omnisport Arena, Bir El Djir; Referees: Belkhiri, Hamidi (ALG) |
| 4 July 2022; 18:00 | 1× (yellow card) 1× (suspension) | Report | 2× (yellow card) 5× (suspension) | Miloud Hadefi Complex Omnisport Arena, Bir El Djir; Referees: Belkhiri, Hamidi (ALG) |

=== Ninth place game ===
| Cancelled | Slovenia | 0–10 | Greece | 24 February Indoor Hall, Arzew |

=== Seventh place game ===
| 4 July 2022; 12:30 | Italy | 34–25 | Turkey | 24 February Indoor Hall, Arzew; Referees: Jakovljević, Sando Kovačević (SRB) |
| 4 July 2022; 12:30 | Mengon, Moretti 6 | (22–11) | İlanç 8 | 24 February Indoor Hall, Arzew; Referees: Jakovljević, Sando Kovačević (SRB) |
| 4 July 2022; 12:30 | | Report | 1× (yellow card) 5× (suspension) | 24 February Indoor Hall, Arzew; Referees: Jakovljević, Sando Kovačević (SRB) |

=== Fifth place game ===
4 July 2022
15:00
Tunisia
39–35 (ET)
Algeria
24 February Indoor Hall, Arzew
Referees: Ilievski, Ilievski (MKD)
Boughanmi 8
(13–12)
Naim 10
6× (suspension)
Report
6× (suspension)

FT: 26–26 ET: 5–5, 8–4

=== Bronze medal game ===
| 6 July 2022; 11:30 | North Macedonia | 29–34 | Serbia | Miloud Hadefi Complex Omnisport Arena, Bir El Djir; Referees: Deche, Ghouarda (ALG) |
| 6 July 2022; 11:30 | Pe. Atanasijevikj, Petrov 5 | (13–15) | Vorkapić 6 | Miloud Hadefi Complex Omnisport Arena, Bir El Djir; Referees: Deche, Ghouarda (ALG) |
| 6 July 2022; 11:30 | 7× (suspension) | Report | 1× (yellow card) 13× (suspension) 1× (red card) | Miloud Hadefi Complex Omnisport Arena, Bir El Djir; Referees: Deche, Ghouarda (ALG) |

=== Gold medal game ===
| 6 July 2022; 16:30 | Egypt | 27–28 | Spain | Miloud Hadefi Complex Omnisport Arena, Bir El Djir; Referees: Belkhiri, Hamidi (ALG) |
| 6 July 2022; 16:30 | Sanad 7 | (16–13) | Tarrafeta 10 | Miloud Hadefi Complex Omnisport Arena, Bir El Djir; Referees: Belkhiri, Hamidi (ALG) |
| 6 July 2022; 16:30 | 3× (suspension) | Report | 1× (yellow card) 5× (suspension) | Miloud Hadefi Complex Omnisport Arena, Bir El Djir; Referees: Belkhiri, Hamidi (ALG) |

== Final standings ==
| Rank | Team |
|---|---|
| 1st place, gold medalist(s) | Spain |
| 2nd place, silver medalist(s) | Egypt |
| 3rd place, bronze medalist(s) | Serbia |
| 4 | North Macedonia |
| 5 | Tunisia |
| 6 | Algeria |
| 7 | Italy |
| 8 | Turkey |
| 9 | Greece |
| 10 | Slovenia |
