= Tunisia at the 2013 Mediterranean Games =

- IOC code: TUN
- NOC: Tunisian Olympic Committee

in Mersin
- Competitors: 74 in 4 sports
- Medals Ranked th: Gold 5 Silver 14 Bronze 13 Total 32

Mediterranean Games appearances (overview)
- 1959; 1963; 1967; 1971; 1975; 1979; 1983; 1987; 1991; 1993; 1997; 2001; 2005; 2009; 2013; 2018; 2022

Tunisia is competing at the 2013 Mediterranean Games in Mersin, Turkey from the 20th to 30 June 2013.

== Basketball ==
=== Men's tournament ===
Team

- Omar Mouhli
- Mokhtar Mohamed Ghayaza
- Makrem Ben Romdhane
- Amine Rzig
- Youssef Gaddour
- Salah Mejri
- Radhouane Slimane
- Omar Abada
- Nizar Knioua
- Mourad El Mabrouk
- Marouan Kechrid
- Zied Chennoufi

Standings

Qualified for the semifinals

Team	Pld	W	L	PF	PA	PD	Pts
Serbia	2	2	0	157	137	+20	4
Tunisia	2	1	1	141	123	+18	2
Italy	2	0	2	107	145	-38	2

Results

June 19
15:00

Report

Italy	43–68	Tunisia
Scoring by quarter: 5-12, 13-14, 11-24, 14-18
Pts: Vitali 10; Rebs: Cervi 9 Asts: Moraschini 2		Pts: El Mabrouk, Ghayaza 10; Rebs: Ben Romdhane 11; Asts: Ben Romdhane 3

Servet Tazegül Arena, Mersin
Referees: Yilmaz (TUR), Kaddour (ALG), Ciulin (ROU)

June 21
15:30

Tunisia	73–80	Serbia

Servet Tazegül Arena, Mersin

== Football ==
=== Men's tournament ===
Team

- Seifedine Lahwel
- Rami Haj Selem
- Khalim Sassi
- Walid Dhaouedi
- Idriss Mhirsi
- Radhouene Khalfaoui
- Rafik Kamarji
- Adem Rjaibi
- Mehdi Ben Nsib
- Bechir Kablouti
- Ayoub Jirtila
- Sedik Mejri
- Oualid Bouzidi
- Zied Ounali
- Slimen Kchok
- Ahmed Khlil
- Achref Mnani
- Azer Ghali

Standings

Team	Pld	W	D	L	GF	GA	GD	Pts
Tunisia	3	2	1	0	6	3	+3	7
Libya	3	1	1	1	5	5	0	4
Italy	3	1	1	1	8	5	+3	4
Macedonia	3	0	1	2	3	9	−6	1

Results

June 19, 2013
21:45

Italy	2-2	Tunisia

Tarsus Şehir Stadı, Tarsus

June 21, 2013
21:45

Tunisia	2-1	Libya

Tevfik Sırrı Gür Stadium, Mersin

June 23, 2013
21:45

North Macedonia	0-2	Tunisia

Tarsus Şehir Stadı, Tarsus

== Handball ==
- Men's Tournament - 1 team of 16 athletes

Team

- Mohamed Tajouri
- Wassim Helal
- Marouan Chouiref
- Jihed Jaballah
- Kamel Alouini
- Abdelhak Ben Salah
- Selim Hedoui
- Mohamed Souissi
- Mosbah Sanai
- Wael Jallouz
- Mohamed Ali Bhar
- Aymen Toumi
- Aymen Hammed
- Oussama Boughanmi
- Amine Bannour
- Women's Tournament - 1 team of 16 athletes

== Sailing ==
Men

Athlete	Event	Race											Net points	Final rank
Athlete	Event	1	2	3	4	5	6	7	8	9	10	M*	Net points	Final rank
Youssef Akrout	Laser													
Zine El Abidine Khairat	Laser													

== Volleyball ==
=== Men's tournament ===
Team

- Saddem Hmissi
- Anouer Taouerghi
- Samir Sellami
- Marouene M'rabet
- Ahmed Kadhi
- Bilel Ben Hassine
- Hakim Zouari
- Elyes Karamosly
- Marouen Garci
- Hamza Nagga
- Ismail Moalla
- Amen Allah Hmissi

Standings

Pos	Team	Pld	W	L	Pts	SW	SL	SR	SPW	SPL	SPR
1	Italy	3	2	1	7	8	2	4.000	255	205	1.244
2	Tunisia	3	2	1	6	6	4	1.500	212	219	0.968
3	Algeria	3	2	1	5	6	5	1.200	240	243	0.988
4	Macedonia	3	0	3	0	1	9	0.111	205	245	0.837

Results

Date	Time		Score		Set 1	Set 2	Set 3	Set 4	Set 5	Total	Report
21-Jun	15:30	Tunisia	3 – 0	Algeria	25-19	25-22	25-18			75–0	
23-Jun	13:00	Tunisia	3 – 1	North Macedonia	20-25	25-18	25-23	25-19		95–0	
25-Jun	13:00	Tunisia	–	Italy							
