= Tunisia at the 1979 Mediterranean Games =

- IOC code: TUN
- NOC: Tunisian Olympic Committee

in Split
- Medals Ranked 9th: Gold 1 Silver 2 Bronze 9 Total 12

Mediterranean Games appearances (overview)
- 1959; 1963; 1967; 1971; 1975; 1979; 1983; 1987; 1991; 1993; 1997; 2001; 2005; 2009; 2013; 2018; 2022

Tunisia (TUN) competed at the 1979 Mediterranean Games in Split, Yugoslavia. IT won 1 gold, 2 silver and 9 bronze medals.
