= Tunisia at the 2001 Mediterranean Games =

- IOC code: TUN
- NOC: Tunisian Olympic Committee

in Tunis
- Medals Ranked 6th: Gold 19 Silver 12 Bronze 25 Total 56

Mediterranean Games appearances (overview)
- 1959; 1963; 1967; 1971; 1975; 1979; 1983; 1987; 1991; 1993; 1997; 2001; 2005; 2009; 2013; 2018; 2022

Tunisia (TUN) hosted the 2001 Mediterranean Games event in the capital Tunis, Tunisia.
