= Buket (name) =

Buket is a Turkish feminine given name. It may refer to:

- Buket Kömür (born 1998), Turkish-British actress
- Buket Öztürk (born 2001), Turkish bocce player
- Buket Uzuner (born 1955), Turkish writer
