= Tunisia at the Mediterranean Games =

- IOC code: TUN
- NOC: Tunisian Olympic Committee
- Medals Ranked 9th: Gold 92 Silver 111 Bronze 172 Total 375

Mediterranean Games appearances (overview)
- 1959; 1963; 1967; 1971; 1975; 1979; 1983; 1987; 1991; 1993; 1997; 2001; 2005; 2009; 2013; 2018; 2022; 2026

Tunisia has competed at every celebration of the Mediterranean Games since the 1959 Mediterranean Games. As of 2026 Mediterranean Games, Tunisian athletes have won a total of 375 medals.

== Medal tables ==
=== Medals by Mediterranean Games ===
Host nation

Below the table representing all Tunisian medals around the games. Till now, Tunisia won 375 medals where 92 of them are gold.

| Games | Athletes | Gold | Silver | Bronze | Total | Rank |
| 1951 Alexandria | The country was under the French Occupation and thus they Did not participate | | | | | |
| 1955 Barcelona | The country was under the French Occupation and thus they Did not participate | | | | | |
| 1959 Beirut | 28 | 3 | 2 | 1 | 6 | 9 |
| 1963 Naples | 46 | 0 | 1 | 1 | 2 | 8 |
| 1967 Tunis | | 5 | 9 | 11 | 25 | 6 |
| 1971 İzmir | 83 | 3 | 6 | 2 | 11 | 8 |
| 1975 Algiers | 123 | 3 | 2 | 2 | 7 | 10 |
| 1979 Split | 154 | 1 | 2 | 9 | 12 | 9 |
| 1983 Casablanca | 99 | 4 | 1 | 4 | 9 | 9 |
| 1987 Latakia | 47 | 2 | 4 | 5 | 11 | 12 |
| 1991 Athens | 82 | 1 | 0 | 5 | 6 | 14 |
| 1993 Languedoc-Roussillon | 60 | 1 | 1 | 8 | 10 | 13 |
| 1997 Bari | 74 | 2 | 3 | 9 | 14 | 12 |
| 2001 Tunis | 303 | 19 | 12 | 25 | 56 | 6 |
| 2005 Almería | 124 | 13 | 7 | 15 | 35 | 7 |
| 2009 Pescara | 131 | 13 | 11 | 14 | 38 | 6 |
| 2013 Mersin | 74 | 7 | 19 | 22 | 48 | 10 |
| 2018 Tarragona | 132 | 6 | 13 | 13 | 32 | 10 |
| 2022 Oran | 175 | 6 | 8 | 13 | 27 | 10 |
| 2026 Taranto | 184 | 3 | 10 | 13 | 26 | 13 |
| Total | | 92 | 111 | 172 | 349 | 9 |

=== Medals by sport ===
| Sport | Gold | Silver | Bronze | Total |
|---|---|---|---|---|
| Athletics | 19 | 23 | 26 | 68 |
| Boxing | 18 | 15 | 32 | 65 |
| Weightlifting | 17 | 18 | 22 | 57 |
| Swimming | 12 | 7 | 9 | 28 |
| Boules | 9 | 4 | 7 | 20 |
| Karate | 6 | 3 | 10 | 19 |
| Wrestling | 5 | 9 | 14 | 28 |
| Judo | 3 | 14 | 25 | 42 |
| Fencing | 2 | 3 | 6 | 11 |
| Gymnastics | 2 | 1 | 3 | 6 |
| Taekwondo | 1 | 3 | 3 | 7 |
| Football | 1 | 2 | 2 | 5 |
| Handball | 0 | 3 | 4 | 7 |
| Tennis | 0 | 2 | 2 | 4 |
| Volleyball | 0 | 2 | 0 | 2 |
| Cycling | 0 | 1 | 0 | 1 |
| Finswimming | 0 | 1 | 0 | 1 |
| Basketball | 0 | 0 | 1 | 1 |
| Totals (18 entries) | 95 | 111 | 166 | 372 |

== Athletes with most medals ==
The Tunisian athlete who won the most medals in the history of the Mediterranean Games, by swimmer Oussama Mellouli.

| Athlete | Sport | Games | Gold medal | Silver medal | Bronze medal | Total |
|---|---|---|---|---|---|---|
| Oussama Mellouli | Swimming | 2001–2005–2009–2013 | 10 | 4 | 0 | 14 |
| Mouna Beji | Boules | 2009–2013–2018–2022 | 5 | 1 | 1 | 7 |
| Mohammed Gammoudi | Athletics | 1963–1967 | 4 | 0 | 0 | 4 |
| [[ ]] | | | | | | |
| [[ ]] | | | | | | |

Notes: in Khaki the athletes still in activity.

== Medal account by gender ==
| # | Venue and Year | Men | | | | Women | | | | Total | | | |
|---|---|---|---|---|---|---|---|---|---|---|---|---|---|
| # | Venue and Year | Gold medal | Silver medal | Bronze medal | Tot. | Gold medal | Silver medal | Bronze medal | Tot. | Gold medal | Silver medal | Bronze medal | Tot. |
| 1 | (Egypt) Alexandria 1951 | | | | | – | – | – | – | | | | |
| 2 | (Spain) Barcelona 1955 | | | | | – | – | – | – | | | | |
| 3 | (Lebanon) Beirut 1959 | | | | | – | – | – | – | | | | |
| 4 | (Italy) Naples 1963 | | | | | – | – | – | – | | | | |
| 5 | (Tunisia) Tunis 1967 | | | | | | | | | | | | |
| 6 | (Turkey) İzmir 1971 | | | | | | | | | | | | |
| 7 | (Algeria) Algiers 1975 | | | | | | | | | | | | |
| 8 | (Socialist Federal Republic of Yugoslavia) Split 1979 | | | | | | | | | | | | |
| 9 | (Morocco) Casablanca 1983 | | | | | | | | | | | | |
| 10 | (Syria) Latakia 1987 | | | | | | | | | | | | |
| 11 | (Greece) Athens 1991 | | | | | | | | | | | | |
| 12 | (France) Narbonne 1993 | | | | | | | | | | | | |
| 13 | (Italy) Bari 1997 | | | | | | | | | | | | |
| 14 | (Tunisia) Tunis 2001 | | | | | | | | | | | | |
| 15 | (Spain) Almeria 2005 | | | | | | | | | | | | |
| 16 | (Italy) Pescara 2009 | | | | | | | | | | | | |
| 17 | (Turkey) Mersin 2013 | | | | | | | | | | | | |
| 18 | (Spain) Tarragona 2018 | | | | | | | | | | | | |
| 19 | (Algeria) Oran 2022 | | | | | | | | | | | | |
| Total | | | | | | | | | | | | | |

== See also ==
- Tunisia at the Olympics
- Tunisia at the All-Africa Games
- Tunisia at the Pan Arab Games
- Tunisia at the Paralympics
- Sports in Tunisia
