= Tunisia at the 1975 Mediterranean Games =

- IOC code: TUN
- NOC: Tunisian Olympic Committee

in Algiers
- Medals Ranked 10th: Gold 3 Silver 2 Bronze 2 Total 7

Mediterranean Games appearances (overview)
- 1959; 1963; 1967; 1971; 1975; 1979; 1983; 1987; 1991; 1993; 1997; 2001; 2005; 2009; 2013; 2018; 2022

Tunisia (TUN) competed at the 1975 Mediterranean Games in Algiers, Algeria. It won 3 gold, 2 silver and 2 bronze medals.
