= Tunisia at the 1963 Mediterranean Games =

- IOC code: TUN
- NOC: Tunisian Olympic Committee

in Naples
- Medals Ranked 7th: Gold 2 Silver 2 Bronze 2 Total 6

Mediterranean Games appearances (overview)
- 1959; 1963; 1967; 1971; 1975; 1979; 1983; 1987; 1991; 1993; 1997; 2001; 2005; 2009; 2013; 2018; 2022

Tunisia (TUN) competed at the 1963 Mediterranean Games in Naples, Italy.
