= İnci Ece Öztürk =

Turkish boccia player (born 1997)

- İnci Ece Öztürk (2020)

Personal information
- National team: Turkey
- Born: 22 March 1997 (age 29) --> Bursa, Turkey
- Relative: Buket Öztürk (sister)

Sport
- Sport: Bocce volo
- Event: Bocce Volo progressive throw
- Club: Bursa BB
Medal record
Women's Bocce volo
Representing Turkey
World Bocce Championship
Gold medal – first place	2023 Rumily	Volo progressive throw
Silver medal – second place	2023 Rumşly	Volo mixed relay
World Games
Silver medal – second place	2025 Chengdu	Volo progressive throw
World Cup
Silver medal – second place	2023 Saint-Vulbas	Volo mixed relay
European Bocce Championship
Gold medal – first place	2024 Mersin	Volo doubles relay
Mediterranean Games
Gold medal – first place	2022 Es Sénia	Volo progressive throw
Gold medal – first place	2018 Tarragona	Volo progressive throw
Islamic Solidarity Games
Gold medal – first place	2021 Konya	Volo progressive throw

İnci Ece Öztürk (born 22 March 1997) is a Turksh female bocce volo player specialized in progressive throw. She represents Turkey at international competitions.

== Sport career ==
Öztürk was introduced to the sport of Bocce by her physical education teacher in the fifth grade of primary school, she had entered after her family changed their location. Her school teacher, who was also interested in bocce, persuaded her and her mother to switch from volleyball to bocce. Her mother purchased the hard-to-find bocce balls, and forced her daughter to go to practice regularly. As she improved in this sport, she began participating in competitions outside the city. At the age of fifteen, she had reached final stages of different events at the Turkish championships.

The turning point in her caeer came with her champions title in the Volo progressive throw event at the 2018 Mediterranean Games in Tarragona, Spain. The same year, she and her sister Bukat became world champion, being the first Turkish world champions in bocce. The sisters won the world cup in 2019. They together won the gold medal in the 2022 European Championship.

She captured the gold medal in the Volo progressive throw event at the 2022 Mediterranean Games in Es Sénia, Algeria. She won the gold medal in the Volo progressive throw event at the 2021 Islamic Solidarity Games in Konya, Turkey, which was postponed to 2022 dur to COVID-19 pandemic in Turkey. That year, she moved to France, and joined the bocce club Rives de Saône.

At the 2023 World Doubles&Mixed Bocce Volo Cup in Saint-Vulbas, France, she and her sister Buket Öztürk failed to advance from the quarterfinals of the Volo doubles relay event, but she won the silver medal in the Volo mixed relay event with Mehmet Can Yakın. She won the gold medal in the Volo progressive throw, and the silver medal in the Volo mixed relay event with Mehmet Can Yakın at the 2023 World Women&Mixed Bocce Volo Championship in Rumily, France.

She captured the gold medal in the Volo doubles relay with Mine Türker at the 2024 European Bocce Women&Mix Championship in Mersin, Turkey.

She won the silver medal in the Lyonnaise progressive shooting at the 2025 World Games şn Chengdu, China.

== Personal life ==
Born on 22 March 1997, İnci Ece Öztürk is a native of Bursa, western Turkey. Her five-year younger sister, Buket Öztürk is also a national bocce player.

After finishing her university education, she completed a Master's degrre, and is preparing a doctoral thesis in the Faculty of Sport science at Uludağ University in Bursa.
