= Boxing at the 1959 Mediterranean Games =

Boxing competition

- Location: Beirut, Lebanon
- Dates: 14–16 October 1959

The boxing tournament at the 1959 Mediterranean Games was held in Beirut, Lebanon.

== Medalists ==
Event	Gold	Silver	Bronze
Flyweight (–51 kg)	Abdel Moneim El-Guindi (UAR)	Ben Larbi (MAR)	Maranon Antonio Ramos (ESP)
Bantamweight (–54 kg)	Ben Mohamed (MAR)	Alfonso Carbajo (ESP)	Yazid Mahmoud El-Nahas (UAR)
Featherweight (–57 kg)	André Iuncker (FRA)	Simon Bellaiche (TUN)	José Luis Biescas (ESP)
Lightweight (–60 kg)	Roger Younsi (FRA)	Vural İnan (TUR)	Hernandes Juan Albornoz (ESP)
Light Welterweight (–63.5 kg)	Sayed El-Nahas (UAR)	Fuat Birol (TUR)	Georges Costi (LBN)
Welterweight (–67 kg)	Omrane Sadok (TUN)	Ben Djilali (MAR)	Dimitrios Mikhail (GRE)
Light Middleweight (–71 kg)	Souleymane Diallo (FRA)	Cesáreo Barrera (ESP)	Mohamed Arafa Rozekah (UAR)
Middleweight (–75 kg)	Abdelaziz Salah El Hasni (TUN)	Hani Zebib (LBN)	Anwar Saed Allah Houlta (UAR)
Light Heavyweight (–81 kg)	Hedi Ben Othmane El Nabli (TUN)	Ibrahim Abdallah (UAR)	Vyron Stoimenidis (GRE)
Heavyweight (+81 kg)	Mahmoud El Kelany (UAR)	Saad El Din Dgheili (LBN)	No bronze awarded

== Medal table ==
Rank	Nation	Gold	Silver	Bronze	Total
1	United Arab Republic (UAR)	3	1	3	7
2	Tunisia (TUN)	3	1	0	4
3	France (FRA)	3	0	0	3
4	Morocco (MAR)	1	2	0	3
5	Spain (ESP)	0	2	3	5
6	Lebanon (LBN)	0	2	1	3
7	Turkey (TUR)	0	2	0	2
8	Greece (GRE)	0	0	2	2
Totals (8 entries)		10	10	9	29

- Note: Official 1959 Mediterranean Games report erroneously omits bronze medal won by José Luis Biescas in the –57 kg category
