= Tunisia at the 1959 Mediterranean Games =

- IOC code: TUN
- NOC: Tunisian Olympic Committee

in Beirut
- Medals Ranked 9th: Gold 3 Silver 2 Bronze 1 Total 6

Mediterranean Games appearances (overview)
- 1959; 1963; 1967; 1971; 1975; 1979; 1983; 1987; 1991; 1993; 1997; 2001; 2005; 2009; 2013; 2018; 2022

Tunisia competed at the 1959 Mediterranean Games in Beirut, Lebanon, with 28 athletes, and the nation finished the competition in the 9th rank and won 6 medals; 3 gold, 2 silver and a bronze medal.

== Medals ==
Tunisia finished the competition in the second rank in boxing where she won 4 medals; 3 golds and a silver. The second silver medal was won by Mongi Soussi Zarrouki in 400 Metres Hurdles event in a timing of 54.1. Norbert Brami was the winner of the bronze medal in Fencing after 4 victories.

=== Medals by sport ===
Sport	Gold	Silver	Bronze	Total
Boxing	3	1	0	4
Athletics	0	1	0	1
Fencing	0	0	1	1
Totals (3 entries)	3	2	1	6

== Medalists ==
Medal	Name	Sport	Event
Gold	Sadek Omrane	Boxing	Welter Weight –67 KG
Gold	Abdelaziz Salah El Hasni	Boxing	Middle Weight –75 KG
Gold	Hedi Ben Othmane El Nabli	Boxing	Light Heavy Weight –81 KG
Silver	Simon Bellaiche	Boxing	Feather Weight –57 KG
Silver	Mongi Soussi Zarrouki	Athletics	400 Metres Hurdles
Bronze	Norbert Brami	Fencing	Men's Épée

== Medal table ==
* Host nation (Lebanon)

Rank	Nation	Gold	Silver	Bronze	Total
1	France	26	27	16	69
2	United Arab Republic	23	21	30	74
3	Turkey	13	8	1	22
4	Italy	12	5	4	21
5	Yugoslavia	11	9	8	28
6	Greece	8	9	13	30
7	Spain	5	12	12	29
8	Lebanon*	3	10	17	30
9	Tunisia	3	2	1	6
10	Morocco	2	3	2	7
Totals (10 entries)		106	106	104	316

== See also ==
- Tunisia at the Mediterranean Games
