= Antonia Tucaković =

Croatian handball player (born 1992)

Personal information
- Full name: Antonia Tucaković
- Nationality: Croatian
- Born: 9 May 1992 (age 34) Split, Croatia
- Height: 1.72 m (5 ft 8 in)

Sport
- Sport: Handball
- Position: Goalkeeper
- Current club: RK Podravka Koprivnica
- Number: 1
National team
- Years: Team
- –: Croatia
Medal record
Mediterranean Games
Silver medal – second place	2022 Oran	Team

Antonia Tucaković (née Jukić; born 9 May 1992) is a Croatian handball player who plays for RK Podravka Koprivnica and the Croatia national team.
