= Sidi Ben Yebka =

Coordinates: 35.8294°N 0.3947°W

- Commune and town
- Interactive map of Sidi Ben Yebka
- Country: Algeria
- Province: Oran Province
- District: Arzew District

Population (1998)
  - Total: 5,893
- Time zone: UTC+1 (CET)

Sidi Ben Yebka is a town and commune in Oran Province, Algeria. According to the 1998 census it has a population of 5893.
