= Simon Bellaiche =

Tunisian boxer (died 2010)

Personal information
- Nationality: Tunisia
- Born: c. 1941 Tunis, Tunisia
- Died: July 13, 2011 Tunis, Tunisia

Sport
- Country: Tunisia
- Sport: Boxing

Medal record

Men's Boxing

Representing Tunisia

Mediterranean Games
Silver medal – second place	1959 Beirut	Feather Weight

Simon Bellaiche (? – July 13, 2010) was a Tunisian boxer, who won the silver medal in the men's Feather Weight (57 kg) category at the 1959 Mediterranean Games in Beirut, Lebanon.
