= Tunisia at the 2009 Mediterranean Games =

- IOC code: TUN
- NOC: Tunisian Olympic Committee

in Pescara
- Medals Ranked 6th: Gold 15 Silver 9 Bronze 13 Total 37

Mediterranean Games appearances (overview)
- 1959; 1963; 1967; 1971; 1975; 1979; 1983; 1987; 1991; 1993; 1997; 2001; 2005; 2009; 2013; 2018; 2022

Tunisia sent 130 athletes to the 2009 Mediterranean Games. Tunisians competed in 17 different sporting disciplines, with 46 competing in team sports and 84 competing individually.

== Medalists ==
Medal	Name	Sport	Event
Gold	Dhouha Ben Othmen	Karate	Kumite −55 kg
Gold	Khalil El Maoui	Weightlifting	Men's 56 kg snatch
Gold	Khalil El Maoui	Weightlifting	Men's 56 kg clean & jerk
Gold	Oussama Mellouli	Swimming	Men's 200 m freestyle
Gold	Oussama Mellouli	Swimming	Men's 400 m freestyle
Gold	Oussama Mellouli	Swimming	Men's 1500 m freestyle
Gold	Oussama Mellouli	Swimming	Men's 400 m individual medley
Gold	Oussama Mellouli	Swimming	Men's 200 m individual medley
Gold	Ahmed Aouadi	Disability athletics	Men's 1500 metres T54
Gold	Samira Berri	Disability athletics	Women's 800 metres T54
Gold	Naziha Hamza	Wrestling	Women's Freestyle 48 kg
Gold	Hajer Barhoumi	Judo	Women's 52 kg
Gold	Mouna Beji, Nadia Ben Abdesslem	Bocce	Women's double
Silver	Ahmed Mathlouthi	Swimming	Men's 200 m freestyle
Silver	Mourad Sahraoui	Boxing	Men's -91 kg
Silver	Soumaya Fatnassi	Weightlifting	Women's 53 kg snatch
Silver	Hanen Ouerfelli	Weightlifting	Women's 69 kg clean & jerk
Silver	Hanen Ouerfelli	Weightlifting	Women's 69 kg snatch
Silver	Soumaya Fatnassi	Weightlifting	Women's 53 kg clean & jerk
Silver	Marwa Amri	Wrestling	Women's Freestyle 55 kg
Silver	Anis Chedly	Judo	Men's +100 kg
Silver	Chahinez M'barki	Judo	Women's 48 kg
Silver	Houda Miled	Judo	Women's 78 kg
Silver	Sarra Besbes	Fencing	Women's Individual Épée
Bronze	Ahmed Mathlouthi	Swimming	Men's 400 m freestyle
Bronze	Wajdi Bouallègue	Gymnastics	Vault
Bronze	Tunisia men's national handball team	Handball	Men's tournament
Bronze	Masouda Siffi	Disability athletics	Women's 800 metres T54
Bronze	Habiba Ghribi	Athletics	Women's 1500 metres
Bronze	Yahia El-Mekachari	Boxing	Men's -81 kg
Bronze	Hamza Hassini	Boxing	Men's -64 kg
Bronze	Mohamed Homrani	Boxing	Men's +91 kg
Bronze	Hedia Tabelsi	Wrestling	Women's Freestyle 51 kg
Bronze	Mohamed Ali Ben Ayech	Wrestling	Men's Freestyle 66 kg
Bronze	Ines Boubakri	Fencing	Women's Individual Foil
Bronze	Nihal Chikhrouhou	Judo	Women's +78 kg
Bronze	Tayeb Arbi, Sami Atallah	Bocce	Men's double
