= Tunisia at the 2005 Mediterranean Games =

- IOC code: TUN
- NOC: Tunisian Olympic Committee

in Almería
- Medals Ranked 7th: Gold 13 Silver 7 Bronze 15 Total 35

Mediterranean Games appearances (overview)
- 1959; 1963; 1967; 1971; 1975; 1979; 1983; 1987; 1991; 1993; 1997; 2001; 2005; 2009; 2013; 2018; 2022

Tunisia (TUN) competed at the 2005 Mediterranean Games in Almería, Spain. The nation had a total number of 124 participants (99 men and 25 women).

== Medals ==
=== Gold ===
Athletics

- Men's 400 metres: Soufiene Laabidi
- Women's 1500 metres: Fatima Langouar

Boxing

- Men's Light Heavyweight (– 81 kg): Mourad Sahraoui

Gymnastics

- Men's Vault: Wajdi Bouallègue

Karate

- Men's – 60 kg: Montassar Tabben

Swimming

- Men's 800m Freestyle: Oussama Mellouli
- Men's 200m Medley: Oussama Mellouli
- Men's 400m Medley: Oussama Mellouli

=== Silver ===
Boxing

- Men's Flyweight (– 51 kg): Walid Cherif
- Men's Heavyweight (– 91 kg): Mohamed Homrani

Gymnastics

- Men's Floor: Wajdi Bouallègue

=== Bronze ===
Athletics

- Men's 400 metres: Ridha Ghali
- Men's 4 × 400 m Relay: Ridha Ghali, Soufiene Laabidi, Kamel Tabbal, and Laroussi Titi
- Men's Decathlon: Hamdi Dhouibi

Judo

- Women's Heavyweight (+ 78 kg): Insaf Yahyaoui

Karate

- Women's – 60 kg: Rafika Dakhlaoui
- Women's Open Class: Rafika Dakhlaoui
- Men's – 65 kg: Hassib Kanoun
- Men's – 80 kg: Mohamed Hammouda

== Results by event ==
Boxing

- Men's Flyweight (– 51 kg)

- Walid Cherif

- Men's Featherweight (– 57 kg)

- Seifeddine Najmaoui

- Men's Lightweight (– 60 kg)

- Saber Guesmi

- Men's Welterweight (– 69 kg)

- Rached Mardassi

- Men's Middleweight (– 75 kg)

- Kamel Tabboubi

- Men's Light Heavyweight (– 81 kg)

- Mourad Sahraoui

- Men's Heavyweight (– 91 kg)

- Mohamed Homrani

- Men's Super Heavyweight (+ 91 kg)

- Mourad Chebbi

== See also ==
- Tunisia at the 2004 Summer Olympics
- Tunisia at the 2008 Summer Olympics
