= Arzew District =

Coordinates: 35.8700°N 0.3200°W

Arzew District دائرة أرزيو
- District
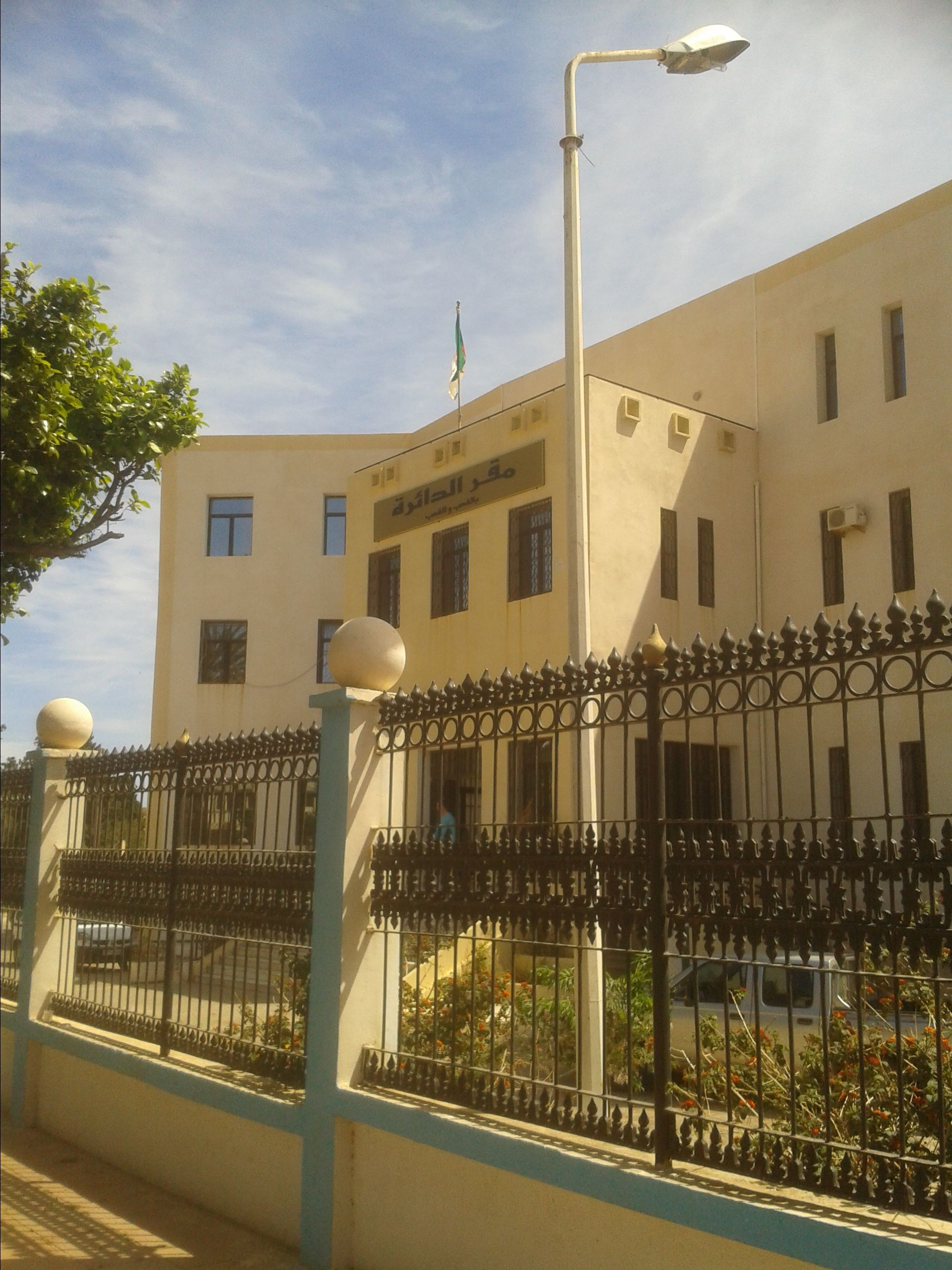

- Map of Algeria highlighting Oran Province

- Map of Oran Province highlighting Arzew District
- Country: Algeria
- Province: Oran
- District seat: Arzew

Area
  - Total: 123.59 km^{2} (47.72 sq mi)

Population (1998)
  - Total: 72,613
  - Density: 587.53/km^{2} (1,521.7/sq mi)
- Time zone: UTC+01 (CET)
- Municipalities: 2

Arzew is a district in Oran Province, Algeria, on the Mediterranean Sea. It was named after its capital, Arzew.

== Municipalities ==
The district is further divided into 2 municipalities:

- Arzew
- Sidi Ben Yebka
