= Buket Öztürk =

Turkish boccia player (born 2001)

BuketÖztürk
- Buket Öztürk (2020)

Personal information
- National team: Turkey
- Born: 30 December 2001 (age 24) --> Bursa, Turkey
- Relative: İnci Ece Öztürk (sister)

Sport
- Sport: Bocce Volo
- Club: Çekirge Spor
- Coached by: Yılmaz Güzelocak
Medal record
Women's Bocce Volo
Representing Turkey
World Bocce Championship
| Silver medal – second place | 2023 Rumily | Volo precision throw |
| Gold medal – first place | 2018 Jiaxing | Volo precision throw |
| Silver medal – second place | 2018 Jiaxing | Volo doubles |
European Bocce Championships
| Gold medal – first place | 2024 Toroslar | Pétanque doubles tradional |
Mediterranean Games
| Gold medal – first place | 2022 Es Sénia | Voloe precision throw |

Buket Öztürk (born 30 December 2001) is a Turkish bocce Volo player specialized in precision throw. She represents Turkey at international competitions.

== Sport career ==
Öztürk started bocce playing at the age of nine in 2010 by watching her older sister's training sessions. Although got aspired, she was not always willing to practice regularly. Her sister forced her to go the training. The training took place in the school's shelter.

She has achieved significant successes since the age of sixteen. She was selected to the national team in 2018, and from then on, she always competed alongside her sister on the national team.

She was a member of Hasanağa TOKİ GSK before she transferred to Çekirge Spor.

In 2017, she won gold medal in the juniors precision throw, doubles and triples events at the Balkan Pétanque Championship in Sofia, Bulgaria. At the 2018 World Bocce Championship in Jiaxing, Chşna, she became gold medalist in the precision throw event, and won the silver medal in the doubles event with her sister İnci Ece Öztürk. The gold medal in the world championship was Turkey's first champions title.

She won the silver medal in Volo precision throw event at the 2023 World Women&Mixed BocceVolo Championship in Rumily, France. At the 2023 World Doubles&Mixed Bocce Volo Cup in Saint-Vulbas, France, she and her sister İnci Ece Öztürk failed to advance from the quarterfinals of the Volo doubles relay event.

She won gold medal in the Volo singles traditional throw and in the doubles traditional throw event with her teammate Emine Dursun at the 2024 European Bocce Women & Mix Championship in Toroslar, Mersin, Turkey.

== Personal life ==
Born on 30 December 2001, Buket Öztürk is a native of Bursa, western Turkey. Her five-year older sister, İnci Ece Öztürk, is also a national bocce player.

She studied in the Faculty of Sport science at Uludağ University in Bursa.
