= Carmen Campos =

Spanish handball player (born 1995)

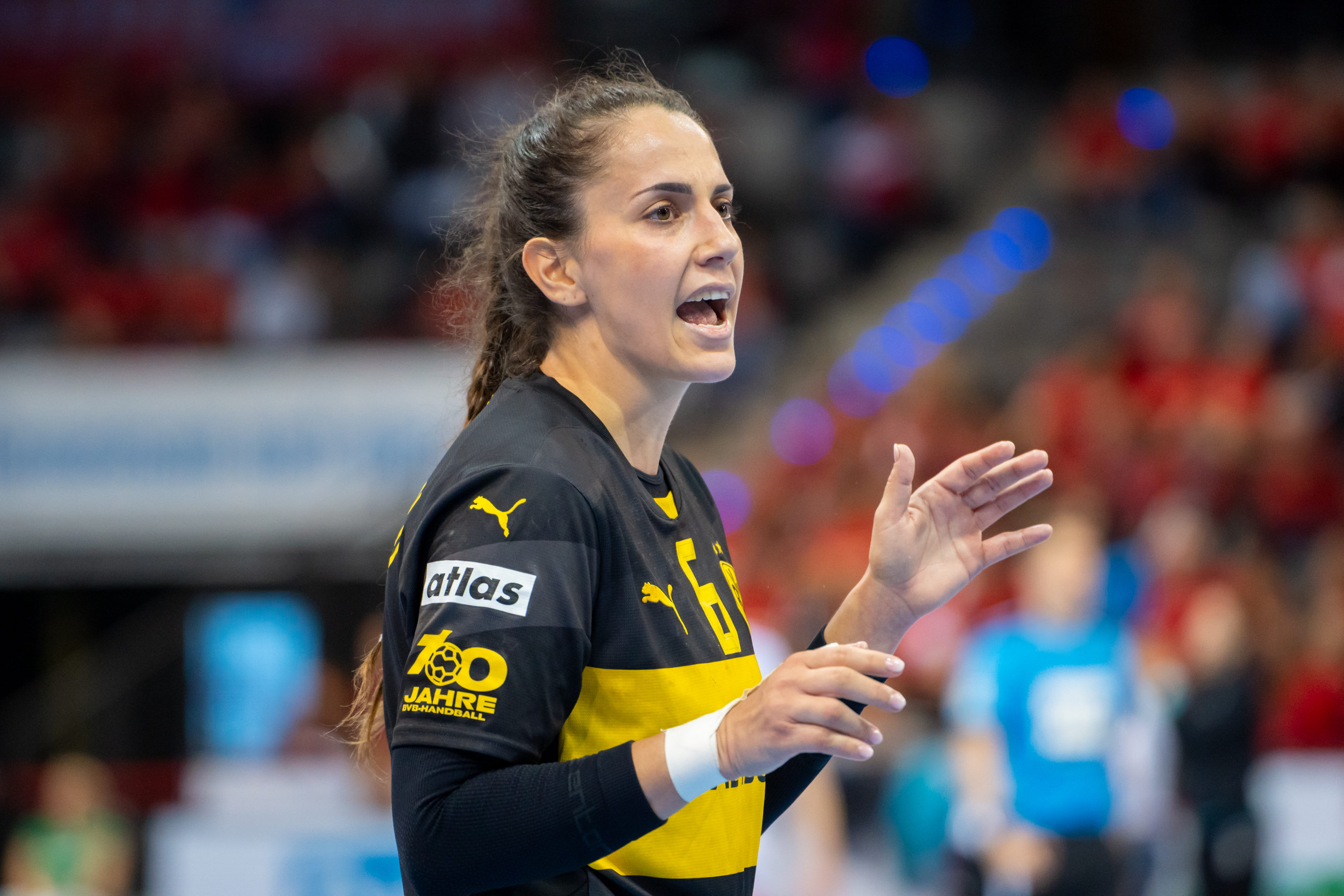
- Campos in 2025

Personal information
- Full name: Carmen Campos Costa
- Nationality: Spanish
- Born: 10 July 1995 (age 31) Madrid, Spain
- Height: 1.71 m (5 ft 7 in)

Sport
- Sport: Handball
- Position: Left back
- Current club: Borussia Dortmund Handball
- Number: 95

Senior clubs
- Years: Team
- –2017: BM Base Villaverde
- 2017–2018: HC Puig d'en Valls
- 2018–2020: CB Atlético Guardés
- 2020–2023: Jeanne d'Arc Dijon Handball
- 2023–: Borussia Dortmund Handball
National team
Years	Team	Apps	(Gls)
2018–	Spain	53	(142)
Medal record
Mediterranean Games
Gold medal – first place	2018 Tarragona	Team
Gold medal – first place	2022 Oran	Team

Carmen Campos Costa (Note: In this Spanish name, the first or paternal surname is Campos and the second or maternal family name is Costa.) (born 10 July 1995) is a Spanish female handballer for Borussia Dortmund Handball and the Spanish national team.

She won the gold medal at the 2018 Mediterranean Games.
