= Boules at the 2022 Mediterranean Games =

Boules competition

- Venue: LOFA Complex
- Dates: 26–29 June

The Boules event at the 2022 Mediterranean Games was held in Es Sénia, Algeria, from 26 to 29 June 2022. Athletes competed in 9 events across 3 disciplines: lyonnaise, pétanque and raffa.

== Medal table ==
* Host nation (Algeria)

Rank	Nation	Gold	Silver	Bronze	Total
1	Turkey	4	1	1	6
2	France	3	0	0	3
3	Italy	2	4	3	9
4	Tunisia	2	1	0	3
5	San Marino	1	1	1	3
6	Spain	0	2	0	2
7	Algeria*	0	1	2	3
8	Croatia	0	1	1	2
8	Morocco	0	1	1	2
10	Libya	0	0	1	1
10	Serbia	0	0	1	1
10	Slovenia	0	0	1	1
Totals (12 entries)		12	12	12	36

== Medal summary ==
=== Lyonnaise ===
Event	Gold	Silver	Bronze
Men's precision shooting	Sébastien Belay; France	Luigi Grattapaglia; Italy	Dejan Kovačević; Serbia
Men's progressive shooting	Alexandre Chirat; France	Stefano Pegoraro; Italy	Marino Miličević; Croatia
Women's precision shooting	Buket Öztürk; Turkey	Valentina Basei; Italy	Tadeja Petrič; Slovenia
Women's progressive shooting	İnci Ece Öztürk; Turkey	Ria Vojković; Croatia	Serena Traversa; Italy

=== Pétanque ===
Event	Gold	Silver	Bronze
Men's precision shooting	İbrahim Arslantaş; Turkey	Mohamed Khaled Bougriba; Tunisia	Mohamed Faycal Ouaghlissi; Algeria
Men's doubles	France; Lucas Desport; Yohan Cousin	Morocco; Lhoussain Akbas; Mohamed Bajjioui	Italy; Saverio Amormino; Andrea Chiapello
Women's precision shooting	Mouna Béji; Tunisia	Sara Díaz; Spain	Karima Ghariz; Morocco
Women's doubles	Tunisia; Mouna Béji; Asma Belli	Spain; Sara Díaz; Melania Homar	Turkey; Gülçin Esen; Beyza Tatarlı

=== Raffa ===
Event	Gold	Silver	Bronze
Men's individual	Mattia Visconti; Italy	Ahmet Emen; Turkey	Enrico Dall'Olmo; San Marino
Men's doubles	Italy; Marco Di Nicola; Mattia Visconti	San Marino; Enrico Dall'Olmo; Jacopo Frisoni	Libya; Rashed Alswesi; Mahmud Issa
Women's individual	Bahar Çil; Turkey	Lamia Aissioui; Algeria	Flavia Morelli; Italy
Women's doubles	San Marino; Stella Paoletti; Anna Maria Ciucci	Italy; Flavia Morelli; Stella Paoletti	Algeria; Lamia Aissioui; Chahrezad Chibani
