= Tunisia at the 2018 Mediterranean Games =

- IOC code: TUN

Mediterranean Games appearances (overview)
- 1959; 1963; 1967; 1971; 1975; 1979; 1983; 1987; 1991; 1993; 1997; 2001; 2005; 2009; 2013; 2018; 2022

Tunisia competed in the 2018 Mediterranean Games held in Tarragona, Spain, from 22 June to 1 July 2018.

== Medals ==
Medals by sport
Sport	1st place, gold medalist(s)	2nd place, silver medalist(s)	3rd place, bronze medalist(s)	Total	Rank
Karate	0	1	0	1	10

== Karate ==
Nader Azzoauzi won the silver medal in the men's kumite 60 kg event.

== Swimming ==
Men

Athlete	Event	Heat		Final	
Athlete	Event	Time	Rank	Time	Rank
Mohamed Agili	200 m freestyle	1:49.67	2 Q	1:48.73	4
Mohamed Agili	400 m freestyle	3:53.23	4 Q	3:52.54	4
Wassim Elloumi	50 m breaststroke	28.70	11	did not advance	
Wassim Elloumi	100 m breaststroke	1:01.81	4 Q	1:01.61 NR	4
Wassim Elloumi	200 m breaststroke	2:15.81	4 Q	2:14.88	5
Mohamed Masmoudi	200 m butterfly	2:05.78	12	did not advance	
Mohamed Masmoudi	400 m individual medley	4:31.23	11	did not advance	

Women

Athlete	Event	Heat		Final	
Athlete	Event	Time	Rank	Time	Rank
Rim Ouenniche	200 m freestyle	2:04.93	12	did not advance	
Rim Ouenniche	50 m backstroke	30.17 NR	10	did not advance	
Rim Ouenniche	100 m backstroke	1:05.96	8 Q	1:04.92	8
