= José Luis Biescas =

Spanish boxer

Personal information
- Nationality: Spanish
- Born: 1 June 1939 (age 85); Tarazona, Spain

Sport
- Sport: Boxing

José Luis Biescas (born 1 June 1939) is a Spanish boxer. He competed in the men's featherweight event at the 1960 Summer Olympics.
