= Tina Barišić =

Croatian handballer (born 2000)

Personal information
- Nationality: Croatian
- Born: 30 October 2000 (age 26) Knin, Croatia
- Height: 1.85 m (6 ft 1 in)

Sport
- Sport: Handball
- Position: Left back
- Current club: RK Podravka Koprivnica
- Number: 44

Senior clubs
- Years: Team
- –2021: ŽRK Umag
- 2021–: RK Podravka Koprivnica
National team
Years	Team	Apps	(Gls)
2022–	Croatia	46	(156)
Medal record
Mediterranean Games
Silver medal – second place	2022 Oran	Team
- Updated on 29 October 2026

Tina Barišić (born 30 October 2000) is a Croatian handballer for RK Podravka Koprivnica and the Croatian national team.

She represented Croatia at the 2022 European Women's Handball Championship and the 2024 European Women's Handball Championship.
