= Handball at the 2022 Mediterranean Games – Women's tournament =

Women's handball at the 2022 Mediterranean Games
Tournament details
- Host country: Algeria
- Venues: 2 (in 2 host cities)
- Dates: 30 June – 6 July
- Teams: 8 (from 2 confederations)

Final positions
- Champions: Spain (3rd title)
- Runners-up: Croatia
- Third place: Serbia
- Fourth place: Portugal

Tournament statistics
- Matches played: 18
- Goals scored: 910 (50.56 per match)
- Top scorers: (Croatia) Katarina Pavlović (44 goals)

The women's handball tournament at the 2022 Mediterranean Games was held from 30 June to 6 July in Aïn El Turk and Bir El Djir.

== Preliminary round ==
All times are local (UTC+1).

=== Group A ===
Pos	Team	Pld	W	D	L	GF	GA	GD	Pts	Qualification
1	Spain	3	3	0	0	85	64	+21	6	Semifinals
2	Croatia	3	2	0	1	82	78	+4	4	Semifinals
3	Tunisia	3	1	0	2	67	75	−8	2	Fifth place game
4	Algeria (H)	3	0	0	3	60	77	−17	0	Seventh place game

Source: Oran 2022
Rules for classification: 1) Points; 2) Head-to-head points; 3) Head-to-head goal difference; 4) Head-to-head goals scored; 5) Goal difference; 6) Goals scored; 7) Draw.
(H) Hosts

30 June 2022; 17:15	Spain	26–20	Algeria	El Hachemí Hantaz Hall, Aïn El Turk; Referees: Ilievski, Ilievski (MKD)
30 June 2022; 17:15	Valdivia 7	(14–9)	five players 3	El Hachemí Hantaz Hall, Aïn El Turk; Referees: Ilievski, Ilievski (MKD)
30 June 2022; 17:15	1× (yellow card) 3× (suspension)	Report	3× (suspension)	El Hachemí Hantaz Hall, Aïn El Turk; Referees: Ilievski, Ilievski (MKD)

30 June 2022; 19:15	Tunisia	26–28	Croatia	El Hachemí Hantaz Hall, Aïn El Turk; Referees: Rodrigues, Pinherio (POR)
30 June 2022; 19:15	Hamrouni 8	(14–17)	Pavlović 12	El Hachemí Hantaz Hall, Aïn El Turk; Referees: Rodrigues, Pinherio (POR)
30 June 2022; 19:15	5× (suspension)	Report	1× (yellow card) 5× (suspension) 1× (red card)	El Hachemí Hantaz Hall, Aïn El Turk; Referees: Rodrigues, Pinherio (POR)

1 July 2022; 17:15	Algeria	21–31	Croatia	El Hachemí Hantaz Hall, Aïn El Turk; Referees: Sá, Sá (POR)
1 July 2022; 17:15	three players 4	(8–14)	Pavlović 9	El Hachemí Hantaz Hall, Aïn El Turk; Referees: Sá, Sá (POR)
1 July 2022; 17:15	1× (yellow card) 6× (suspension)	Report	1× (yellow card) 6× (suspension)	El Hachemí Hantaz Hall, Aïn El Turk; Referees: Sá, Sá (POR)

1 July 2022; 19:15	Spain	28–21	Tunisia	El Hachemí Hantaz Hall, Aïn El Turk; Referees: Jakovljević, Kovačević (SRB)
1 July 2022; 19:15	Arrojeria 7	(11–8)	Bouri 4	El Hachemí Hantaz Hall, Aïn El Turk; Referees: Jakovljević, Kovačević (SRB)
1 July 2022; 19:15	1× (yellow card) 3× (suspension)	Report	3× (suspension)	El Hachemí Hantaz Hall, Aïn El Turk; Referees: Jakovljević, Kovačević (SRB)

2 July 2022; 17:00	Algeria	19–20	Tunisia	El Hachemí Hantaz Hall, Aïn El Turk; Referees: Ilievski, Ilievski (MKD)
2 July 2022; 17:00	Makhloufi 7	(9–10)	Masri 7	El Hachemí Hantaz Hall, Aïn El Turk; Referees: Ilievski, Ilievski (MKD)
2 July 2022; 17:00	1× (yellow card) 5× (suspension)	Report	2× (yellow card) 6× (suspension)	El Hachemí Hantaz Hall, Aïn El Turk; Referees: Ilievski, Ilievski (MKD)

2 July 2022; 19:15	Croatia	23–31	Spain	El Hachemí Hantaz Hall, Aïn El Turk; Referees: Hamidi, Belkhiri (ALG)
2 July 2022; 19:15	Posavec 8	(12–18)	Campos 7	El Hachemí Hantaz Hall, Aïn El Turk; Referees: Hamidi, Belkhiri (ALG)
2 July 2022; 19:15	2× (yellow card) 3× (suspension)	Report	3× (yellow card) 3× (suspension)	El Hachemí Hantaz Hall, Aïn El Turk; Referees: Hamidi, Belkhiri (ALG)

=== Group B ===
Pos	Team	Pld	W	D	L	GF	GA	GD	Pts	Qualification
1	Serbia	3	3	0	0	78	64	+14	6	Semifinals
2	Portugal	3	2	0	1	69	64	+5	4	Semifinals
3	Turkey	3	1	0	2	86	88	−2	2	Fifth place game
4	North Macedonia	3	0	0	3	62	79	−17	0	Seventh place game

Source: Oran 2022
Rules for classification: 1) Points; 2) Head-to-head points; 3) Head-to-head goal difference; 4) Head-to-head goals scored; 5) Goal difference; 6) Goals scored; 7) Draw.

30 June 2022; 12:00	North Macedonia	27–34	Turkey	El Hachemí Hantaz Hall, Aïn El Turk; Referees: Deche, Guarda (ALG)
30 June 2022; 12:00	Kiprijanovska 6	(16–19)	Türkoglu 8	El Hachemí Hantaz Hall, Aïn El Turk; Referees: Deche, Guarda (ALG)
30 June 2022; 12:00	2× (suspension)	Report	4× (yellow card) 6× (suspension)	El Hachemí Hantaz Hall, Aïn El Turk; Referees: Deche, Guarda (ALG)

30 June 2022; 14:15	Serbia	21–20	Portugal	El Hachemí Hantaz Hall, Aïn El Turk; Referees: Kahouadji, Farsi (ALG)
30 June 2022; 14:15	Jovović 11	(13–12)	Sabino 6	El Hachemí Hantaz Hall, Aïn El Turk; Referees: Kahouadji, Farsi (ALG)
30 June 2022; 14:15	1× (yellow card) 2× (suspension) 1× (red card)	Report	3× (suspension)	El Hachemí Hantaz Hall, Aïn El Turk; Referees: Kahouadji, Farsi (ALG)

1 July 2022; 12:00	Turkey	26–30	Portugal	El Hachemí Hantaz Hall, Aïn El Turk; Referees: Farsi, Kahouadji (ALG)
1 July 2022; 12:00	Türkoglu 5	(14–12)	Sabino 9	El Hachemí Hantaz Hall, Aïn El Turk; Referees: Farsi, Kahouadji (ALG)
1 July 2022; 12:00	5× (suspension)	Report	3× (suspension)	El Hachemí Hantaz Hall, Aïn El Turk; Referees: Farsi, Kahouadji (ALG)

1 July 2022; 14:15	North Macedonia	18–26	Serbia	El Hachemí Hantaz Hall, Aïn El Turk; Referees: Hamidi, Belkhiri (ALG)
1 July 2022; 14:15	Dukoska, Kiprijanovska 5	(8–10)	Jovović 8	El Hachemí Hantaz Hall, Aïn El Turk; Referees: Hamidi, Belkhiri (ALG)
1 July 2022; 14:15	1× (yellow card) 6× (suspension)	Report	2× (yellow card) 5× (suspension)	El Hachemí Hantaz Hall, Aïn El Turk; Referees: Hamidi, Belkhiri (ALG)

2 July 2022; 12:00	Turkey	26–31	Serbia	El Hachemí Hantaz Hall, Aïn El Turk; Referees: Deche, Ghouarda (ALG)
2 July 2022; 12:00	İskit 5	(14–17)	three players 5	El Hachemí Hantaz Hall, Aïn El Turk; Referees: Deche, Ghouarda (ALG)
2 July 2022; 12:00	2× (yellow card) 7× (suspension)	Report	3× (yellow card) 4× (suspension)	El Hachemí Hantaz Hall, Aïn El Turk; Referees: Deche, Ghouarda (ALG)

2 July 2022; 14:15	Portugal	19–17	North Macedonia	El Hachemí Hantaz Hall, Aïn El Turk; Referees: Ghoul, Chergui (ALG)
2 July 2022; 14:15	Sabino 8	(13–11)	Dukovska 10	El Hachemí Hantaz Hall, Aïn El Turk; Referees: Ghoul, Chergui (ALG)
2 July 2022; 14:15	1× (yellow card) 3× (suspension)	Report	1× (yellow card) 5× (suspension)	El Hachemí Hantaz Hall, Aïn El Turk; Referees: Ghoul, Chergui (ALG)

== Playoffs ==
=== Bracket ===
Semifinals
4 July
Spain	26
Portugal	24
4 July
Serbia	20
Croatia	31

Gold medal
6 July
Spain	29
Croatia	25
Bronze medal
6 July
Portugal	22
Serbia	26

=== Semifinals ===
4 July 2022; 10:30	Spain	26–24	Portugal	Miloud Hadefi Complex Omnisport Arena, Bir El Djir; Referees: Farsi, Kahouadji (ALG)
4 July 2022; 10:30	Campos 10	(12–13)	Minciuna 6	Miloud Hadefi Complex Omnisport Arena, Bir El Djir; Referees: Farsi, Kahouadji (ALG)
4 July 2022; 10:30	1× (yellow card) 4× (suspension)	Report	1× (yellow card) 4× (suspension)	Miloud Hadefi Complex Omnisport Arena, Bir El Djir; Referees: Farsi, Kahouadji (ALG)

4 July 2022; 15:30	Serbia	20–31	Croatia	Miloud Hadefi Complex Omnisport Arena, Bir El Djir; Referees: Sá, Sá (POR)
4 July 2022; 15:30	Vukajlović 8	(12–16)	Barišić, Pavlović 8	Miloud Hadefi Complex Omnisport Arena, Bir El Djir; Referees: Sá, Sá (POR)
4 July 2022; 15:30	1× (yellow card) 3× (suspension)	Report	2× (yellow card) 3× (suspension)	Miloud Hadefi Complex Omnisport Arena, Bir El Djir; Referees: Sá, Sá (POR)

=== Seventh place game ===
4 July 2022; 10:00	Algeria	23–31	North Macedonia	El Hachemí Hantaz Hall, Aïn El Turk; Referees: Díaz-Flores, Pérez (ESP)
4 July 2022; 10:00	Zazai 7	(12–17)	Dukoska 10	El Hachemí Hantaz Hall, Aïn El Turk; Referees: Díaz-Flores, Pérez (ESP)
4 July 2022; 10:00	5× (suspension)	Report	3× (suspension)	El Hachemí Hantaz Hall, Aïn El Turk; Referees: Díaz-Flores, Pérez (ESP)

=== Fifth place game ===
4 July 2022; 12:30	Tunisia	29–35	Turkey	El Hachemí Hantaz Hall, Aïn El Turk; Referees: Rodrigues, Pinherio (POR)
4 July 2022; 12:30	Hachana 6	(14–20)	İskit 6	El Hachemí Hantaz Hall, Aïn El Turk; Referees: Rodrigues, Pinherio (POR)
4 July 2022; 12:30	4× (suspension)	Report	1× (yellow card) 5× (suspension)	El Hachemí Hantaz Hall, Aïn El Turk; Referees: Rodrigues, Pinherio (POR)

=== Bronze medal game ===
6 July 2022; 09:00	Portugal	22–26	Serbia	Miloud Hadefi Complex Omnisport Arena, Bir El Djir; Referees: Pérez, Díaz-Flores (ESP)
6 July 2022; 09:00	three players 4	(12–10)	Jovović, Vukajlović 7	Miloud Hadefi Complex Omnisport Arena, Bir El Djir; Referees: Pérez, Díaz-Flores (ESP)
6 July 2022; 09:00	3× (suspension)	Report	2× (yellow card) 6× (suspension)	Miloud Hadefi Complex Omnisport Arena, Bir El Djir; Referees: Pérez, Díaz-Flores (ESP)

=== Gold medal game ===
6 July 2022; 14:00	Spain	29–25	Croatia	Miloud Hadefi Complex Omnisport Arena, Bir El Djir; Referees: Sá, Sá (POR)
6 July 2022; 14:00	Campos 9	(17–13)	Pavlović 9	Miloud Hadefi Complex Omnisport Arena, Bir El Djir; Referees: Sá, Sá (POR)
6 July 2022; 14:00	3× (suspension)	Report	2× (yellow card) 3× (suspension)	Miloud Hadefi Complex Omnisport Arena, Bir El Djir; Referees: Sá, Sá (POR)

== Final standings ==
Rank	Team
1st place, gold medalist(s)	Spain
2nd place, silver medalist(s)	Croatia
3rd place, bronze medalist(s)	Serbia
4	Portugal
5	Turkey
6	Tunisia
7	North Macedonia
8	Algeria
