= Katarina Pavlović =

Croatian handballer (born 1995)

Personal information
- Nationality: Croatian
- Born: 30 January 1995 (age 31) Ljubuški, Bosnia and Herzegovina
- Height: 1.80 m (5 ft 11 in)

Sport
- Sport: Handball
- Position: Right back
- Current club: Alba Fehérvár KC
- Number: 24

Senior clubs
- Years: Team
- 2009–2013: ŽRK Ljubuški
- 2013–2015: ŽRK Zelina
- 2015–2016: HSG Blomberg-Lippe
- 2017: MTV 1860 Altlandsberg
- 2017–2021: BSV Sachsen Zwickau
- 2021–2022: Rocasa Gran Canaria
- 2022–2023: CSM Târgu Jiu
- 2023–2025: CS Minaur Baia Mare
- 2025–: Alba Fehérvár KC
National team
Years	Team	Apps	(Gls)
2022–	Croatia	52	(147)
Medal record
Mediterranean Games
Silver medal – second place	2022 Oran	Team
- Updated on 29 October 2026

Katarina Pavlović (born 30 January 1995) is a Croatian handballer for the Hungarian team Alba Fehérvár KC and the Croatian national team.

She represented Croatia at the 2022 European Women's Handball Championship.
