= Esther Arrojería =

Spanish handball player (born 1994)

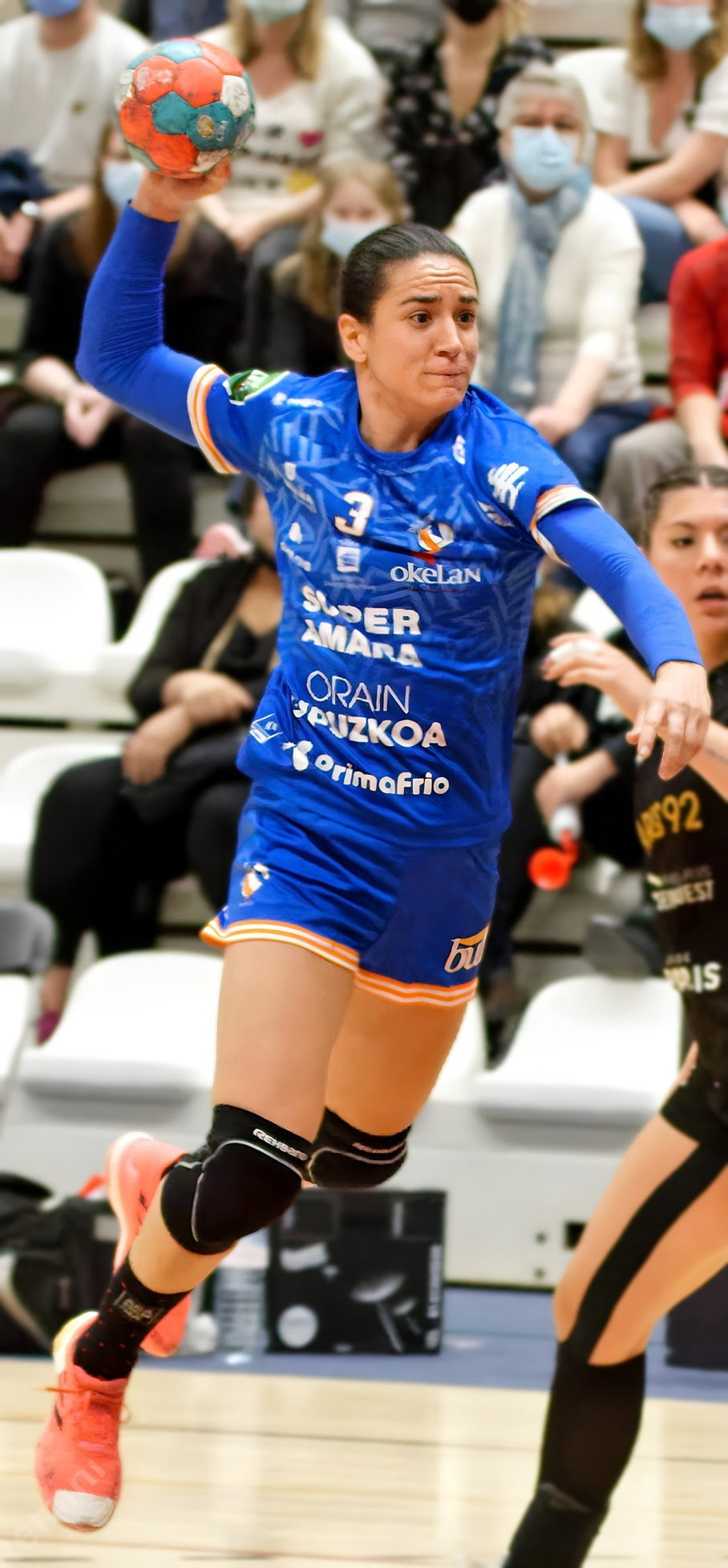
- Esther Arrojería Arantzazistroke (2021)

Personal information
- Full name: Esther Arrojería Arantzazistroke
- Nationality: Spanish
- Born: 11 February 1994 (age 32) Usurbil, Spain
- Height: 1.63 m (5 ft 4 in)

Sport
- Sport: Handball
- Position: Centre back
- Current club: BM Bera Bera
- Number: 3

Senior clubs
- Years: Team
- 2012–: BM Bera Bera
National team
| Years | Team | Apps | (Gls) |
| 2018– | Spain | 28 | (49) |
Medal record
Mediterranean Games
| Gold medal – first place | 2022 Oran | Team |
- Updated on 9 July 2024

Esther Arrojería Arantzazistroke (born 11 February 1994) is a Spanish female handballer for BM Bera Bera and the Spanish national team.

Arrojería made her official debut on the Spanish national team on 24 March 2018, against Poland. She also represented Spain at the 2022 European Women's Handball Championship in Slovenia, Montenegro and North Macedonia.

== Honours ==
=== Club ===
- División de Honor Femenina de Balonmano:
  - Winner: 2013, 2014, 2015, 2016, 2018, 2020, 2021, 2022
- Copa de la Reina de Balonmano:
  - Winner: 2013, 2014, 2016, 2019
- Supercopa de España de Balonmano Femenino:
  - Winner: 2013, 2014, 2015, 2016, 2017, 2019, 2022

=== National team ===
- Mediterranean Games:
  - Gold Medalist: 2022
