= Martin Serafimov =

Macedonian handball player

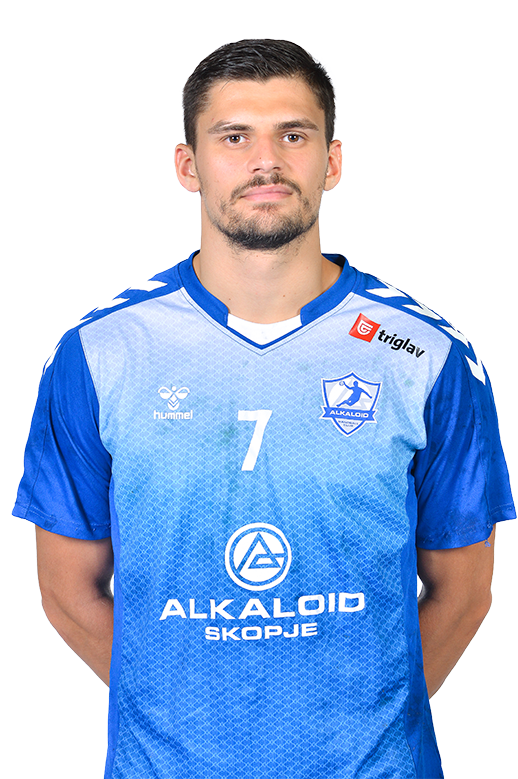
- Martin Serafimov in the RK Alkaloid kit

Personal information
- Nationality: Macedonian
- Born: 3 March 2000 (age 26) Skopje, Macedonia
- Height: 1.90 m (6 ft 3 in)

Sport
- Sport: Handball
- Position: Right back
- Current club: RK Eurofarm Pelister

Youth career
- Years: Team
- –: RK Metalurg Skopje

Senior clubs
- Years: Team
- 2017–2019: RK Metalurg II
- 2017–2021: RK Metalurg Skopje
- 2021–04/2026: RK Alkaloid
- 2026–: RK Eurofarm Pelister
National team
| Years | Team | Apps | (Gls) |
| 2018– | Macedonia | 36 | (71) |

Martin Serafimov (Macedonian: Мартин Серафимов) (born 3 March 2000) is a Macedonian handball player for RK Eurofarm Pelister and the Macedonian national team.

He represented Macedonia at the 2019 World Men's Handball Championship.

== Honours ==
RK Metalurg Skopje (North Macedonia)

- Macedonian Handball Cup

Winner (1): 2019

- Macedonian Handball Super League

Winner (1): 2020
RK Alkaloid (North Macedonia)

- Macedonian Handball Cup

Winner (1): 2024

- Macedonian Handball Super Cup

Winner (1): 2024

- EHF European Cup

Winner (1): 2024-25
