= Mohamed Ali Bhar =

Tunisian handball player

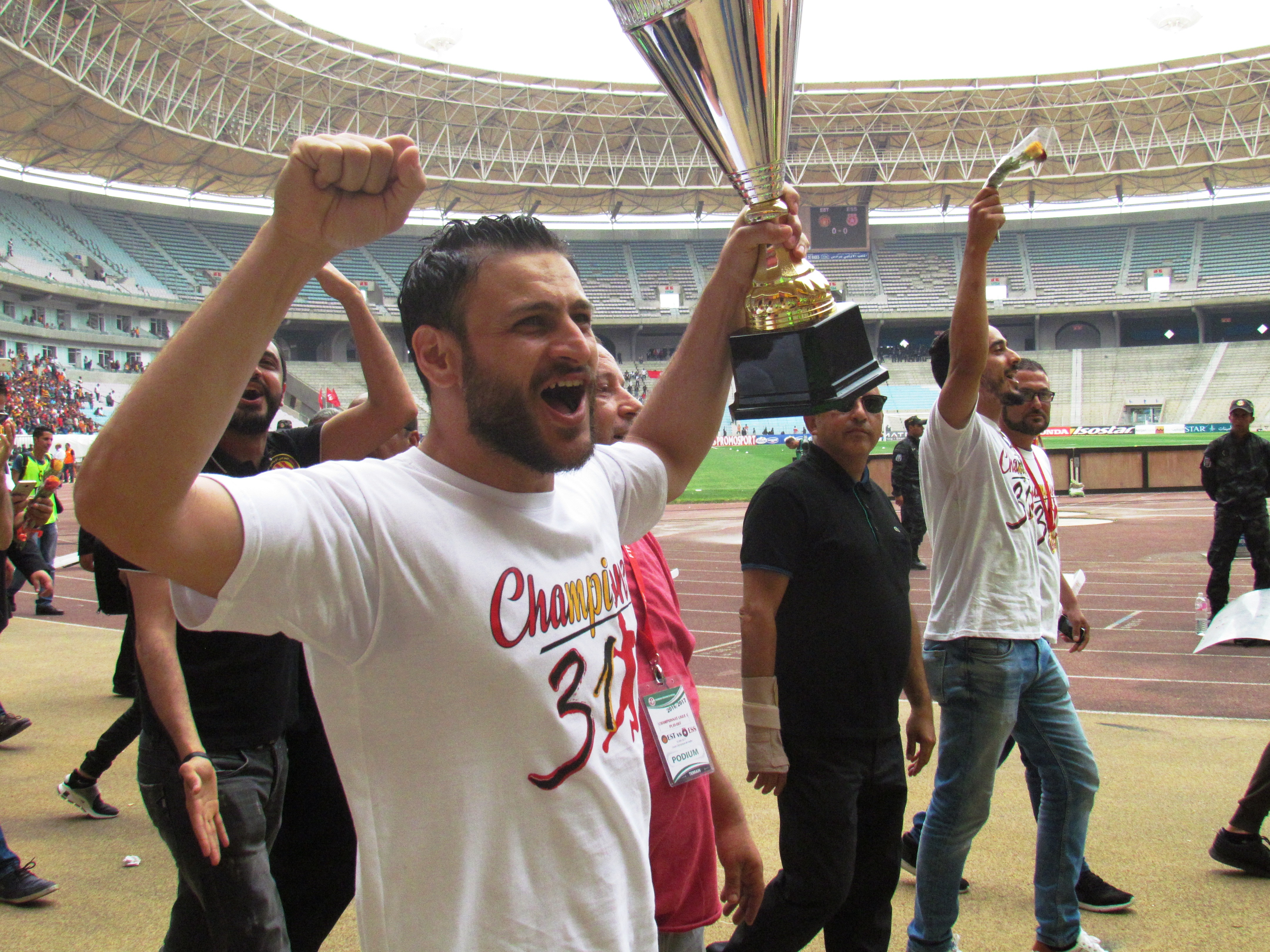

Personal information
- Nationality: Tunisian
- Born: 17 September 1989 (age 37) Moknine, Tunisia
- Height: 1.80 m (5 ft 11 in)

Sport
- Sport: Handball
- Position: Right wing
- Current club: Espérance de Tunis
- Number: 13
National team
- Years: Team
- –: Tunisia

Mohamed Ali Bhar (born 17 September 1989) is a Tunisian handball player for Espérance de Tunis and the Tunisian national team.

He participated at the 2016 Summer Olympics.
