= Vukašin Vorkapić =

Serbian handball player (born 1997)

Personal information
- Nationality: Serbian
- Born: 1 October 1997 (age 29) Belgrade, Serbia, FR Yugoslavia
- Height: 1.88 m (6 ft 2 in)

Sport
- Sport: Handball
- Position: Right wing
- Current club: Vardar 1961
- Number: 3

Senior clubs
- Years: Team
- –2021: Metaloplastika
- 2021–2023: US Ivry
- 2023–2026: Vojvodina
- 2026–present: Vardar 1961
National team
Years	Team	Apps	(Gls)
2018–present	Serbia	34	(69)
Medal record
Mediterranean Games
Bronze medal – third place	2022 Oran	Team
- Updated on 15 January 2026

Vukašin Vorkapić (Serbian Cyrillic: Вукашин Воркапић; born 1 October 1997) is a Serbian handball player for Vardar 1961. He also represents the Serbian national team.

Vorkapić represented Serbia at the 2019 World Men's Handball Championship.

== Honours ==
- Macedonian Handball Super League (North Macedonia)

Winner Gold :2026

- Macedonian Cup (North Macedonia)

Winner Gold : 2026
