= 24 February Indoor Hall =

Indoor sports arena in Arzew, Algeria

- Interactive map of 24 February Indoor Hall
- Location: Arzew, Algeria
- Operator: OPOW of Oran
- Capacity: 3,000

Construction
- Opened: 30 July 2007
- Renovated: 13 April 2022

Tenant
- ES Arzew

The 24 February Sports Indoor Hall (Arabic: قاعة متعددة الرياضات 24 فبراير), is an indoor sports arena located in Arzew, Algeria. The official seating capacity of the arena is 3,000.

== History ==
The Omnisport hall (OMS) in Arzew has been reopened after three years of closure during which it underwent major restoration work in anticipation of the 19th edition of the Mediterranean Games scheduled for next summer in Oran.

== Sports hosted ==
=== Team sports ===
Futsal, Team Handball, Basket-ball, Volley-ball.

=== Individual sports ===
Martial arts (Karate, Judo, Kickboxing ...etc.).

== Competitions hosted ==
Some of major senior competitions are below

- Mediterranean Games
  - 1 time (2022)
