= Arzew =

Arzew أرزيو
- Municipality
- Arzew
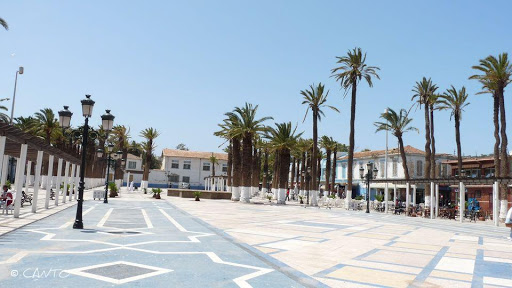
- View of Arzew with municipality sign

- Location of Arzew within Oran Province

- Location of Arzew within Algeria
- Coordinates: 35°51′N 0°19′W
- Country: Algeria
- Province: Oran
- District: Arzew (seat)

Government
  - PMA Seats: 15

Area
  - Total: 64 km^{2} (25 sq mi)
- Elevation: 72 m (236 ft)

Population (2006)
  - Total: 91,400
  - Density: 1,400/km^{2} (3,700/sq mi)
- Time zone: UTC+01 (CET)
- Postal code: 31200
- ONS code: 3106

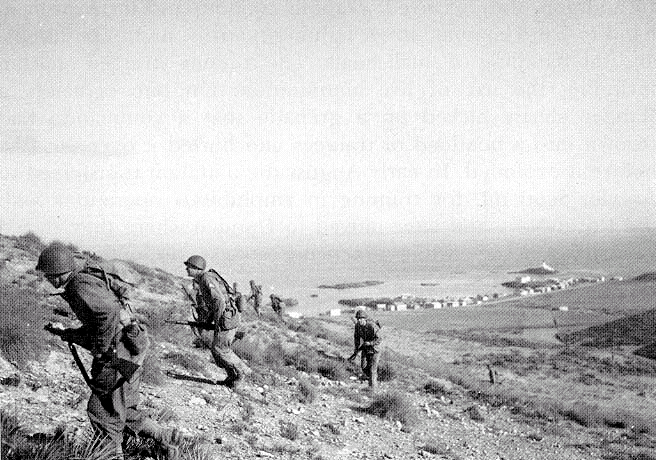
U.S. Rangers train on the terrain of the 8 November 1942 assault at Arzew

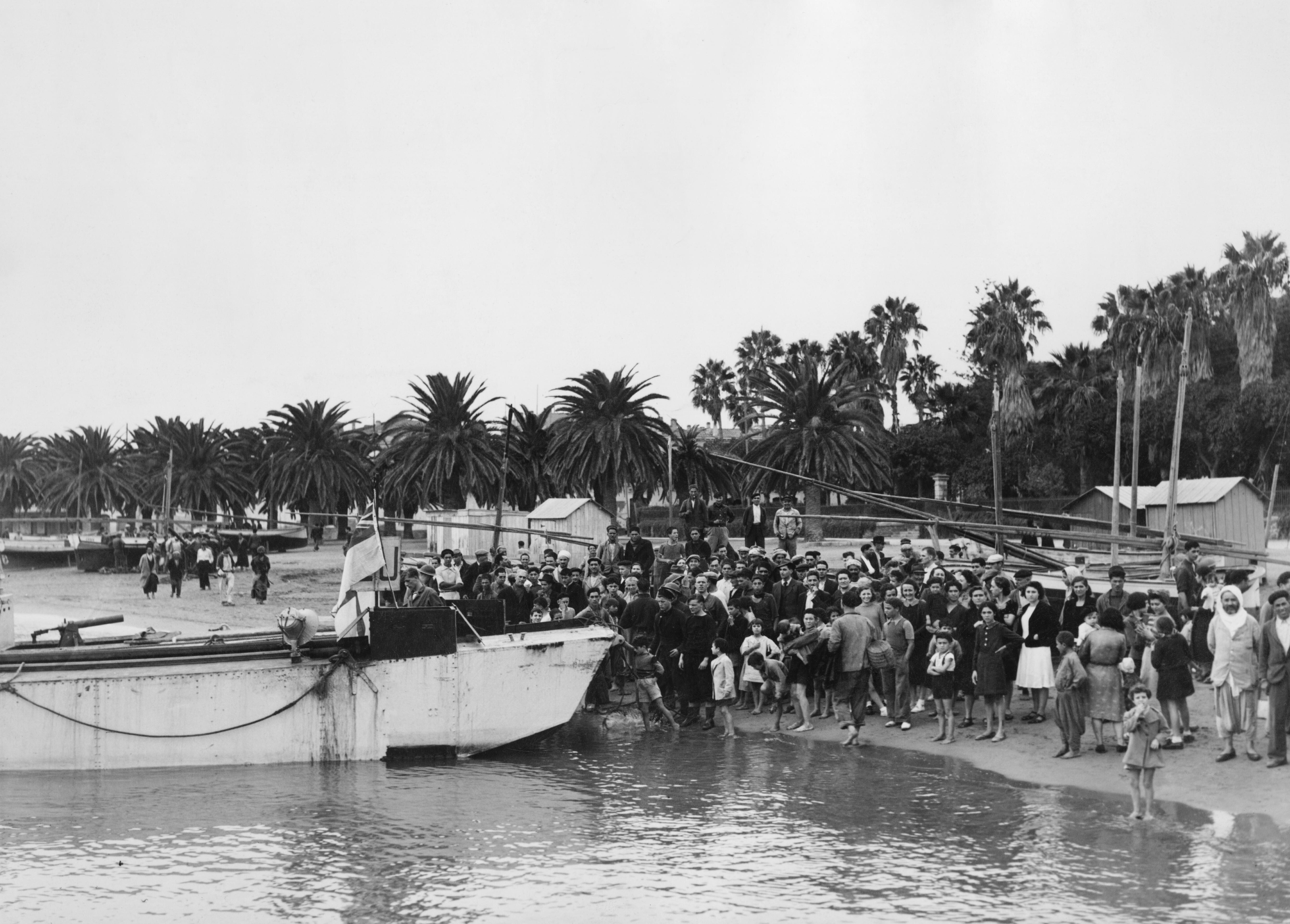
Arzew inhabitants meet U.S. troops during Operation Torch (November 1942)

Arzew or Arzeu (Arabic: أرزيو, ʾArzyu) is a port city in Algeria, 25 miles (40 km) from Oran. It is the capital of Arzew District, Oran Province.

== History ==
=== Antiquity ===
Like the rest of the Maghreb, the site of modern-day Arzew was originally inhabited by the Berbers. Arzew's original Berber population came mainly from the nearby town of Bethioua, families from nearby Mostaganem, Kabyles, that were deported there.

Nearby Bethioua was on the ruins of the Phoenician Empire of Carthage before becoming the Portus Magnus ("Great Port") under the Roman Empire, although the name was used on Arzew's coat of arms under French colonial rule. Portus Magnus was a Roman colony or otherwise received citizen status and exported grain and salt. Arsenaria was a nearby settlement 3 Roman miles (c. 4.4 km) inland from the sea. Portus Magnus was destroyed during the Vandal conquest of northwest Africa in AD 429 or 430 but saw some use by the Byzantines after their 6th-century recovery of the area, leaving some Christian remains. After the 7th-century Islamic conquest, the site seems to have been entirely abandoned, El Bekri describing "Arzao" as having only empty Roman ruins c. 1068. The Almohads refounded the port as Bethioua in 1162. Under the Ziyanids, this port near Tlemcen was renamed Marsa Ben Zian ("Port of the Sons of Zian"). The Roman relics remaining at Bethioua into the early modern period were mostly removed to the provincial museum at Oran during the 19th and 20th centuries.

=== French Algeria ===
During the French conquest of Algeria, a French force from Oran marched east to capture Marsa on 10 July 1833. The French army then used the area as a logistics hub, including during the Battle of Macta.

Upon the Treaty of Desmichels, Arzew was organized as part of French Algeria, initially under the spelling Arzowe. King Louis-Philippe ordered the establishment of the port of Arzew (Arzew Le Port) on 12 August 1845. French colonists settled the area, which was declared a commune on 31 December 1856. Many Spanish immigrants also came, and Arzew became a hub for the production and export of esparto, a kind of grass used for cording. The town was badly damaged by an earthquake in 1912. The area was important during Operation Torch, the Allied invasion of North Africa during World War II.

During the Algerian War of Independence, the city hosted one of the two SDECE French intelligence CIPCGs (Centre d'instruction à la pacification et à la contre-guérilla), bases used for counter-guerrilla and pacification work.

=== Modern Algeria ===
After the independence of Algeria in 1962, Arzew became an important port and industrial area, home to a refinery exporting LNG (liquified natural gas), as well as a fleet of small fishing boats to work the local waters.

== Demography ==
Historical population
Year	Pop.	±%
1901	5,600	—
1954	10,500	+87.5%
1966	11,500	+9.5%
1987	35,800	+211.3%
1998	56,200	+57.0%
Source: Populstat

== Culture ==
During the French colonial era, the settlers introduced a Roman Catholic celebration on August 15 -Assumption of Mary day- known as the "Procession of the Virgin" (la Procession de la Vierge).
