= Tunisian Olympic Committee =

National Olympic Committee

- Country: Tunisia
- Code: TUN
- Created: 1957
- Recognized: 1957
- Continental Association: ANOCA
- Headquarters: Tunis, Tunisia
- President: Mehrez Boussayene
- Secretary General: Skander Hachicha
- Website: www.cnot.org.tn

The Tunisian Olympic Committee (IOC code: TUN; Arabic: اللجنة الوطنية الأولمبية التونسية) is the National Olympic Committee that represents Tunisia in the Olympic Movement. It was founded and recognized by the IOC in 1957. It is based in Tunis. It is member of the International Olympic Committee (IOC), the Association of National Olympic Committees of Africa and others international sports organisation.

== List of presidents ==
President	Term
Mohamed Ben Abdelkader	1957–1960
Chedly Zouiten	1960–1962
Mohammed Mzali	1962–1987
Slaheddine Baly	1987–2002
Mohamed Gueddiche	2002–2004
Abdelhamid Slama	2004–2009
Slim Chiboub	2009–2011
Younes Chetali	2011–2013
Mehrez Boussayene	2013–present

== See also ==
- Tunisia at the Olympics
