= List of national sports teams of Kosovo =

Kosovo
- Use: Flag of Kosovo

National sports teams of Kosovo is a list of sports teams representing Kosovo.

== Multiport events ==
- Kosovo at the Olympics
- Kosovo at the Paralympics
- Kosovo at the Youth Olympics
- Kosovo at the European Games
- Kosovo at the European Youth Olympic Festival
- Kosovo at the European Championships
- Kosovo at the Mediterranean Games
- Kosovo at the Jeux de la Francophonie
- Kosovo at the FISU World University Games
- Special Olympics Kosovo
- Kosovo at the World Games

== Single sport events ==
=== Men ===
- Basketball
  - Kosovo men's national basketball team
  - Kosovo men's national under-20 basketball team
  - Kosovo men's national under-18 basketball team
  - Kosovo men's national under-16 basketball team
  - Kosovo men's national 3x3 team
- Football
  - Kosovo national football team
  - Kosovo national under-21 football team
  - Kosovo national under-19 football team
  - Kosovo national under-17 football team
  - Kosovo national under-15 football team
  - Kosovo national futsal team
  - Kosovo national minifootball team
- Handball
  - Kosovo men's national handball team
- Rugby union
  - Kosovo national rugby union team
  - Kosovo national rugby sevens team
- Tennis
  - Kosovo Davis Cup team

=== Women ===
- Basketball
  - Kosovo women's national basketball team
  - Kosovo women's national under-20 basketball team
  - Kosovo women's national under-18 basketball team
  - Kosovo women's national under-16 basketball team
- Football
  - Kosovo women's national football team
  - Kosovo women's national under-19 football team
  - Kosovo women's national under-17 football team
- Handball
  - Kosovo women's national handball team
- Tennis
  - Kosovo Billie Jean King Cup team
- Volleyball
  - Kosovo women's national volleyball team

== See also ==
- Sport in Kosovo
- Membership of Kosovo in international sports federations
- National sports team
