= Sport in Kosovo =

Popular team sports in Kosovo include football, basketball, volleyball, handball, and rugby, whereas major individual sports include wrestling, judo, swimming, boxing, karate and skiing.

Kosovo has seen more success internationally in individual sports, in particular judo, with 66 medals won in total, including 36 European medals, three Olympic gold medals, as well as nine World Judo medals and nine medals at the Mediterranean Games.

Previously, boxing had a high-profile role in Kosovo when it was part of the former Yugoslavia, winning 22 medals overall. Boxers from Kosovo won nine medals at the Mediterranean Games (three were gold medals) followed by seven medals in European Boxing, four medals in World Boxing and one Olympic bronze medal in 1984 by Aziz Salihu. Donjeta Sadiku would win the first ever gold medal for Kosovo at the Female Boxing World Cup in Warsaw (the first gold medal for the country in boxing since their Independence).

== Football in Kosovo ==
Locations of the 2023–24 Football Superleague of Kosovo teams

The Kosovo national football team has had some success in its short history. Their first success came at the 2018–19 UEFA Nations League when they finished in first place in Group D, in League D. Kosovo secured a promotion after beating Azerbaijan. Kosovo finished the league unbeaten (four wins and two draws) and secured for themselves a play-off spot in the UEFA Euro 2020. After the Nations League, Kosovo entered the UEFA Euro 2020 qualifying in Group A. Kosovo was able to upset the opponents after managing their first win against Bulgaria, followed by a win against the Czech Republic. Though the game against England saw Kosovo take an early lead they would go on to lose the match ending their unbeaten streak of 15 Matches in the process. In the following match, Kosovo defeated Montenegro. Kosovo finished their qualifying campaign in third place with eleven points. In the UEFA Euro 2020 qualifying play-offs Kosovo faced North Macedonia. The match itself was very close but North Macedonia would win, ending Kosovo's hopes for a debut participation at the UEFA Euro 2020.

=== Early Years ===
In 1922 the two first football clubs were formed: FC Gjakova and FC Prishtina. Until 1926 the clubs competed within the several levels of the Belgrade Football Subassociation, and after 1926, clubs from Kosovo were integrated into the newly formed Skopje Football Subassociation. The subassociations organised different levels of leagues which served as qualification leagues for the Yugoslav championship. From 1945 until 1991, football in the former Yugoslavia advanced so fast that in 1946 the Football Federation of Kosovo was formed as a subsidiary of the Football Federation of Yugoslavia. The most successful team from Kosovo in the first league of Yugoslavia was FC Prishtina. In 1991 the Football Federation of Kosovo was refounded after all football players from Kosovo were banned from the First League in Yugoslavia. The first game was held in KF Flamurtari's stadium on 13 September 1991 in Pristina, which also marked the start of the first independent championship in Kosovo. The governing body in Kosovo is responsible for the national team and for most of the main cup competitions.

Currently, Kosovo has a football league system which incorporates a number of clubs. The top division, the Raiffeisen Super League, has 12 teams. The league was founded in 1945 and is organized by the Football Federation of Kosovo. The other three professional divisions are the first league which includes 16 teams, and the second and third league. The main cup competition in Kosovo is the Republic of Kosovo Cup, which is open to every men's football team that is part of the Football Federation of Kosovo. The most successful clubs are FC Prishtina (twenty championship titles), KF Vëllaznimi (eight championship titles), KF Trepça (seven championship titles), KF Liria (five championship titles), and KF Besa (three championship titles).

On 29 November 1942, Kosovo for first time in its history played a friendly match as part of the celebrations for the 30th Anniversary of the Independence of Albania against Tirana. (Note: The alternative name of the Albania national team that was used during this match.)

The two main clubs in football are FC Prishtina and KF Trepça. Prishtina FC was founded in 1922, while KF Trepça was founded ten years later in 1932. KF Trepça was part of the 1977–78 championship in the former Yugoslavia League in football. They became the only Kosovan Football club ever to reach the finals in the Yugoslav Cup. FC Prishtina became the first member of the league in 1983, and it achieved an impressive victory after beating Red Star in Belgrade with 3–1.

=== 1967–1975 ===
On 8 November 1967, Kosovo, for the first time as an autonomous province of SFR Yugoslavia, played a friendly match against Yugoslavia and the match ended with a 3–3 home draw. For Yugoslavia this match was a pre-preparation before the UEFA Euro 1968 qualifying match against Albania.

==== Brotherhood and Unity Tournament ====
Eight years after the match against Yugoslavia, Kosovo in 1975 participated for the first and last time in the Brotherhood and Unity Tournament, which was held in Pristina and Prizren, where they won in all four matches of this tournament against Montenegro (2–0), Bosnia and Herzegovina (2–1), Slovenia (2–0) and Macedonia (1–0) and took first place.

Year	Round	Pos	Pld	W	D	L	GF	GA
(Socialist Republic of Serbia) Brotherhood and Unity Tournament	Winner	1st	4	4	0	0	7	1
Total	Best: Winner	1/1	4	4	0	0	7	1

=== Efforts for internationalization of Kosovo in FIFA and UEFA ===
In September 2012, Albania international Lorik Cana, along with Swiss internationals Granit Xhaka, Valon Behrami and Xherdan Shaqiri, all of them with Kosovo Albanian origin, wrote a declaration to FIFA President Sepp Blatter, asking him to allow Kosovo to play friendly matches. The declaration was also signed by eight other footballers from Kosovo: Ahmed Januzi, Alban Meha, Armend Dallku, Burim Kukeli, Etrit Berisha, Fatmire Bajramaj, Lorik Cana, Mërgim Mavraj and Samir Ujkani.

On 6 February 2013, FIFA decided to allow Kosovan club teams to play friendly games against clubs from countries whose national teams were members of FIFA. However, it was stipulated that Kosovan clubs and teams could not display national symbols such as the Kosovan flag, emblem, etc., or play the Kosovan anthem. On 5 March 2014, the Kosovan football team was allowed by FIFA to play its first international friendly match, against Haiti. This match ended in a 0–0 draw.

After the match against Haiti, six more matches followed in 2014, against Turkey, Senegal, Albania, Equatorial Guinea and Oman respectively. Kosovo would secure their first win ever in an international football match after beating Oman 1–0 with a goal from Albert Bunjaku.

=== Membership in UEFA and FIFA ===
In September 2015, at an UEFA Executive Committee meeting in Malta, the request from Kosovo for admission in UEFA was scheduled for deliberation in the next Ordinary Congress, to be held in Budapest. On 3 May 2016, at the Ordinary Congress, Kosovo was accepted into UEFA after members voted 28–24 in favour of Kosovo. Ten days later, Kosovo was accepted in FIFA during their 66th Congress in Mexico, with 141 votes in favour and 23 against.

FC Ballkani became the first to qualify for an UEFA Competition. In Group G Ballkani faced Prishtina in the debut CFR Cluj from Romania. The match ended in a draw, securing Kosovo's first ever points in a UEFA club competition. After a close loss to Slavia Prague, Ballkani would go on to secure Kosovo its first win in a UEFA competition Turkey. Ballkani could not progress further and secured only four points in the process, finishing in last place. It is still Kosovo's highest European club football success. They went on to quality for the 2023–24 UEFA Europa Conference League.

=== Kosovo women's national football team ===
Kosovo made their debut in the 2019 FIFA Women's World Cup qualification, where Kosovo was drawn with Albania, Greece and Malta. Kosovo failed to qualify and finished last in the group with three losses. After failing to qualify for the 2019 FIFA Women's World Cup, Kosovo participated in the UEFA Women's Euro 2021 qualifying, together with Estonia, Russia, Slovenia, Turkey and 2019 World Cup runners-up finisher Netherlands. Kosovo defeated Turkey in a 2–0 home win, their first-ever competitive win.

=== Achievements in football ===
- UEFA European Championship:
  - Playoffs (1): UEFA Euro 2020 qualifying play-offs.
  - Promotion (2): 2018–19 UEFA Nations League D, 2024–25 UEFA Nations League League C
- Kosovo national football team: being 15 Matches unbeaten between 2017-2019 winning 11 Matches out of it.
- Unofficial Football World Championships: Kosovo became the Champion in this Championship after beating Sweden in their last game 0-1 recently.

=== Kosovo Youth Football Teams in UEFA and regional competitions ===
- Valais Youth Cup
  - 4th place (1): at the 2013 Valais Youth Cup in Switzerland for the Kosovo national under-21 football team

=== Kosovan football clubs in UEFA Club and Continental Competitions ===
- UEFA Conference League:
  - Groupstage (3): FC Ballkani in 2022-23 and 2023–24, as well as FC Drita in 2025-26
- Mitropa Cup:
  - Runners Up (1): FC Prishtina in the 1983–84 Mitropa Cup.
- Yugoslav Cup:
  - Runners Up (1): by KF Trepça in 1977-78.
  - Semifinalist (1): FC Prishtina in 1987-88.

=== Kosovan Futal clubs in UEFA Club Competitions ===
- UEFA Futsal Champions League:
  - Round of 16 (2): Feniks Drenica in 2016-17 and by Prishtina 01 in 2023-24
  - Round of 32 (1): FC Prishtina in 2020-21

=== Kosovan Female Football in UEFA and FIFA Competitions ===
- UEFA Women's Nations League:
  - Promotion (1): 2023–24 UEFA Women's Nations League C
- Turkish Women's Cup:
  - Winners (2): the Kosovo women's national football team in 2023 and 2024
- BFU International Women's Cup:
  - Winners (1) by the Kosovo women's national football team in 2023
- UEFA Women's Champions League:
  - Round of 32 (1): KFF Mitrovica in 2019-20

=== Gjilan derby ===
Gjilan derby is the largest football derby in Kosovo which is contested between fierce rivals Drita FC and SC Gjilani. The derby was started in 1995 after the crisis and split of Drita FC. For the past 20 years, the match has attracted tens of thousands of fans.

=== Active ===
==== UEFA Champions League ====
Performances by clubs
Club	Pld	W	D	L	Win %
Drita	10	5	0	5	50.00
Ballkani	6	2	1	3	33.33
Prishtina	4	2	0	2	50.00
Feronikeli	4	2	1	1	50.00
Trepça '89	2	0	0	2	0.00
Total	26	11	2	13	42.31

Season	Team	Round	Opponent	Home	Away	Agg.
2017–18	Trepça '89	1Q	(Faroe Islands) Víkingur Gøta	1–4	1–2	2–6
2018–19	Drita	PR	(Andorra) FC Santa Coloma	2–0 (a.e.t.)		
2018–19	Drita	PR	(Gibraltar) Lincoln Red Imps	4–1 (a.e.t.)		
2018–19	Drita	1Q	(Sweden) Malmö	0–3	0–2	0–5
2019–20	Feronikeli	PR	(Gibraltar) Lincoln Red Imps	1–0		
2019–20	Feronikeli	PR	(Andorra) FC Santa Coloma	2–1		
2019–20	Feronikeli	1Q	(Wales) The New Saints	0–1	2–2	2–3
2020–21	Drita	PR	(Andorra) Inter d'Escaldes	2–1		
2020–21	Drita	PR	(Northern Ireland) Linfield	0–3 (awarded)		
2021–22	Prishtina	PR	(San Marino) Folgore	2–0		
2021–22	Prishtina	PR	(Andorra) Inter d'Escaldes	2–0		
2021–22	Prishtina	1Q	(Hungary) Ferencváros	1–3	0–3	1–6
2022–23	Ballkani	1Q	(Lithuania) Žalgiris	1–1	0–1 (a.e.t.)	1–2
2023–24	Ballkani	1Q	(Bulgaria) Ludogorets Razgrad	2–0	0–4	2–4
2024–25	Ballkani	1Q	(Andorra) UE Santa Coloma	1–2 (a.e.t.)	2–1	3–3 (5–6 p)
2025–26	Drita	1Q	(Luxembourg) Differdange 03	1–0	3–2	4–2
2025–26	Drita	2Q	(Denmark) Copenhagen	0–1	0–2	0–3

==== UEFA Europa League ====
Performances by clubs
Club	Pld	W	D	L	Win %
Prishtina	11	2	4	5	18.18
Drita	4	1	1	2	25.00
Gjilani	2	1	0	1	50.00
Feronikeli	2	0	0	2	0.00
Llapi	2	0	0	2	0.00
Total	21	4	5	12	19.05

Season	Team	Round	Opponent	Home	Away	Agg.
2017–18	Prishtina	1Q	(Sweden) Norrköping	0–1	0–5	0–6
2018–19	Prishtina	PR	(Gibraltar) Europa	5–0	1–1	6–1
2018–19	Prishtina	1Q	(Luxembourg) Fola Esch	0–0 (4–5 p)	0–0	0–0 (4–5 p)
2018–19	Drita	2Q	(Luxembourg) F91 Dudelange	1–1	1–2	2–3
2019–20	Prishtina	PR	(Gibraltar) St Joseph's	1–1	0–2	1–3
2019–20	Feronikeli	2Q	(Slovakia) Slovan Bratislava	0−2	1−2	1−4
2020–21	Prishtina	PR	(Gibraltar) Lincoln Red Imps	0–3 (awarded)		
2020–21	Gjilani	PR	(San Marino) Tre Penne	3–1		
2020–21	Gjilani	1Q	(Cyprus) APOEL	0–2 (a.e.t.)		
2020–21	Drita	2Q	(North Macedonia) Sileks	2–0		
2020–21	Drita	3Q	(Poland) Legia Warsaw	0–2		
2021–22 2022–23 2023–24	did not qualify					
2024–25	Llapi	1Q	(Poland) Wisła Kraków	1–2	0–2	1−4
2025–26	Prishtina	1Q	(Moldova) Sheriff Tiraspol	2–1	0–4	2–5
2025–26	Drita	3Q	(Romania) FCSB	1–3	2–3	3–6

==== UEFA Conference League ====
Performances by clubs
Club	Pld	W	D	L	Win %
Ballkani	32	16	4	12	50.00
Drita	20	9	4	7	45.00
Prishtina	6	2	2	2	33.33
Dukagjini	4	2	0	2	50.00
Gjilani	4	1	1	2	25.00
Llapi	6	0	3	3	0.00
Malisheva	4	1	0	3	25.00
Total	76	31	14	31	40.79

Season	Team	Round	Opponent	Home	Away	Agg.
2021–22	Llapi	1Q	(North Macedonia) Shkupi	1–1	0–2	1–3
2021–22	Drita	1Q	(Montenegro) Dečić	2–1	1–0	3–1
2021–22	Drita	2Q	(Netherlands) Feyenoord	0–0	2–3	2–3
2021–22	Prishtina	2Q	(Wales) Connah's Quay Nomads	4–1	2–4	6–5
2021–22	Prishtina	3Q	(Norway) Bodø/Glimt	2–1	0–2	2–3
2022–23	Gjilani	1Q	(Latvia) Liepāja	1–0	1–3	2–3
2022–23	Llapi	1Q	(Montenegro) Budućnost Podgorica	2–2	0–2	2–4
2022–23	Drita	1Q	(Finland) Inter Turku	3–0	0–1	3–1
2022–23	Drita	2Q	(Belgium) Antwerp	0–2	0–0	0–2
2022–23	Ballkani	2Q	(San Marino) La Fiorita	6–0	4–0	10–0
2022–23	Ballkani	3Q	(Faroe Islands) KÍ	3–2	1–2 (a.e.t.)	4–4 (4–3 p)
2022–23	Ballkani	PO	(North Macedonia) Shkupi	1–0	2–1	3–1
2022–23	Ballkani	GS	(Czech Republic) Slavia Prague	0–1	2–3	4th
2022–23	Ballkani	GS	(Romania) CFR Cluj	1–1	0–1	4th
2022–23	Ballkani	GS	(Turkey) Sivasspor	1–2	4–3	4th
2023–24	Gjilani	1Q	(Luxembourg) Progrès Niederkorn	0–2	2–2	2-4
2023–24	Dukagjini	1Q	(Gibraltar) Europa	2–1	3–2	5–3
2023–24	Dukagjini	2Q	(Croatia) Rijeka	0–1	1–6	1–7
2023–24	Drita	2Q	(Czech Republic) Viktoria Plzeň	1–2	0–0	1–2
2023–24	Ballkani	2Q	(Northern Ireland) Larne	3–0	4–1	7–1
2023–24	Ballkani	3Q	(Gibraltar) Lincoln Red Imps	2–0	3–1	5–1
2023–24	Ballkani	PO	(Belarus) BATE Borisov	4–1	0–1	4–2
2023–24	Ballkani	GS	(Croatia) Dinamo Zagreb	2–0	0–3	4th
2023–24	Ballkani	GS	(Czech Republic) Viktoria Plzeň	0–1	0–1	4th
2023–24	Ballkani	GS	(Kazakhstan) Astana	1–2	0–0	4th
2024–25	Malisheva	1Q	(Montenegro) Budućnost Podgorica	1–0	0–3	1–3
2024–25	Llapi	2Q	(Denmark) Brøndby	2–2	0–6	2–8
2024–25	Ballkani	2Q	(Malta) Ħamrun Spartans	0–0	2–0	2–0
2024–25	Ballkani	3Q	(Northern Ireland) Larne	0–1	1–0 (a.e.t.)	1–1 (1–4 p)
2024–25	Drita	2Q	(Iceland) Breiðablik	1–0	2–1	3–1
2024–25	Drita	3Q	(Latvia) Auda	3–1 (a.e.t.)	0–1	3–2
2024–25	Drita	PO	(Poland) Legia Warsaw	0–2	0–1	0–3
2025–26	Malisheva	1Q	(Iceland) Víkingur Reykjavík	0–8	0–1	0–9
2025–26	Prishtina	2Q	(Northern Ireland) Larne	1–1 (a.e.t.)	0–0	1–1 (4–5 p)
2025–26	Ballkani	2Q	(Malta) Floriana	4–2	1–1	5–3
2025–26	Ballkani	3Q	(Republic of Ireland) Shamrock Rovers	1–0	0–4	1–4

=== Other ===
==== UEFA Youth League ====
Performances by clubs
Club	Pld	W	D	L	Win %
2 Korriku	8	5	0	3	62.50
Total	8	5	0	3	62.50

Season	Team	Round	Opponent	Home	Away	Agg.
2024–25	2 Korriku	1R	(Albania) Bylis	2–1	1–2	4–2
2024–25	2 Korriku	2R	(Republic of Ireland) UCD	2–1	1–3	5–1
2024–25	2 Korriku	3R	(Ukraine) Dynamo Kyiv	1–4	5–0	1–9
2025–26	2 Korriku	To be determined				

=== Defunct ===
==== Mitropa Cup ====
Performances by clubs
Club	Pld	W	D	L	Win %
Prishtina	6	2	1	3	33.33
Total	6	2	3	1	33.33

Season	Team	Round	Opponent	Home	Away	Agg.
1983–84	Prishtina	RR	(Austria) Eisenstadt	3–3	2–4	Runners-up
1983–84	Prishtina	RR	(Hungary) Vasas	4–2	1–1	Runners-up
1983–84	Prishtina	RR	(Czechoslovakia) Teplice	2–0	1–1	Runners-up

=== Cups and Finals ===
==== Mitropa Cup ====
Team	Winners	Runners-up	Years won	Years runner-up
Prishtina	–	1	–	1983-84

==== Yugoslav Cup ====
Team	Winners	Runners-up	Years won	Years runner-up
Mitrovica	–	1	–	1977-78

=== Overal UEFA Club Record ===
Competition	P	W	D	L	GF	GA	GD	Win %
UEFA Champions League	26	11	2	13	30	42	−12	42.31
UEFA Europa League / UEFA Cup	23	4	5	14	21	39	−18	17.39
UEFA Conference League	76	31	14	31	91	99	−8	40.79
UEFA Youth League	6	4	0	2	10	12	−2	66.67
Mitropa Cup	6	2	3	1	13	11	+2	33.33
Total	137	52	24	61	165	203	−38	37.96

== Futsal ==
Kosovo was accepted as an UEFA futsal member at the Congress in Budapest, September 2015. They were accepted as a World Futsal member at the 66th FIFA congress held in Mexico, being fully accepted in May 2016. The Futsal Superleague of Kosovo was founded in 2005.

They gained access to the UEFA Futsal Champions League in their debut season in the 2016–17 UEFA Futsal Cup. FC Feniks Drenas made their debut for Kosovo at this competition. Feniks won all three matches against Oxford City Lions with 2-3 from England, then beating FC Encamp with a high scoring 0–12 win against the host of this round. In the third and final match Feniks Drenica beat ASA Tel Aviv with a final score of 6-0. Feniks became the first Kosovan Futsal Club to qualify for the Elite Round, competing with the sixteen best European clubs that year. It is so far also the best result for Kosovo in a Football-based competition. They would finish the season in 13th place.

The next success came by FC Prishtina who competed in the UEFA Futsal Champions League for the first time in the 2020–21 season, entering at the preliminary round. On 21 October 2020, the draw was held and Prishtina were drawn against the Albanian side Tirana. On 25 November 2020, Prishtina beat Tirana, this victory secured the qualification for the round of 32, where they faced Spanish giants Barcelona, who defeated FC Prishtina with a result of 9–2.

In the 2023–24 UEFA Futsal Champions League FC Prishtina were able to qualify for the Round of 16 after beating Iceland Ísbjörninn as well as Norwegian Utleira, against the Polish host they ended in a draw, finishing this group in the first place. In the following round Prishtina was able to repeat its success by beating the Finnish side Kampuksen Dynamo, after that they drew against the host FK Kauno Žalgiris but then followed by defeating AEL Futsal to secure Kosovo's second qualification at the Round of 16 in their history.

=== Kosovo futsal clubs in European competitions ===
Season	Team	Round	Opponent	Home	Away	Agg.
UEFA Futsal Cup
2016–17	Feniks	PR	(England) Oxford City Lions	3–2		
2016–17	Feniks	PR	(Andorra) Encamp (H)	12–0		
2016–17	Feniks	PR	(Israel) ASA Tel Aviv	6–0		
2016–17	Feniks	MR	(North Macedonia) Železarec Skopje (H)	5–0		
2016–17	Feniks	MR	(Azerbaijan) Araz Naxçivan	0–1		
2016–17	Feniks	MR	(Georgia (country)) Tbilisi State University	7–3		
2016–17	Feniks	ER	(Latvia) Nikars	3–4		
2016–17	Feniks	ER	(Kazakhstan) Kairat (H)	0–6		
2016–17	Feniks	ER	(Italy) Real Rieti	3–6		
2017–18	Liburni	PR	(Lithuania) Vytis	7–3		
2017–18	Liburni	PR	(Montenegro) Titograd	7–2		
2017–18	Liburni	PR	(Luxembourg) Differdange 03 (H)	6–2		
2017–18	Liburni	MR	(France) Garges Djibson	6–4		
2017–18	Liburni	MR	(Croatia) Nacional (H)	4–9		
2017–18	Liburni	MR	(Armenia) Leo	5–6		
UEFA Futsal Champions League
2018–19	Feniks (H)	MR	(Kazakhstan) Kairat	3–7		
2018–19	Feniks (H)	MR	(Belarus) Lidselmash Lida	2–3		
2018–19	Feniks (H)	MR	(Portugal) Sporting CP	0–5		
2019–20	Liburni	MR	(France) Toulon Élite	5–5		
2019–20	Liburni	MR	(Netherlands) Hovocubo	3–3		
2019–20	Liburni	MR	(Belarus) Stalitsa Minsk (H)	1–1		
2020–21	Prishtina	PR	(Albania) Tirana (H)	3–0		
2020–21	Prishtina	R32	(Spain) Barcelona (H)	2–9		
2021–22	Liqeni	PR	(Turkey) Tavşançalı	5–0		
2021–22	Liqeni	PR	(England) Helvécia	7–6		
2021–22	Liqeni	PR	(Germany) TSV Weilimdorf (H)	3–2		
2021–22	Liqeni	MR	(Romania) United Galati	6–4		
2021–22	Liqeni	MR	(Ukraine) Uragan Ivano-Frankivsk (H)	1–7		
2021–22	Liqeni	MR	(Azerbaijan) Araz Naxçivan	6–6		
2022–23	Liqeni	MR (H)	(Belarus) Stalitsa Minsk	2–6		
2022–23	Liqeni	MR (H)	(Poland) Piast Gliwice	3–9		
2022–23	Liqeni	MR (H)	(Denmark) Gentofte	4–3		
2023–24	Prishtina 01	PR	(Iceland) Ísbjörninn	11–1		
2023–24	Prishtina 01	PR	(Norway) Utleira	5–1		
2023–24	Prishtina 01	PR	(Poland) KSC Lubawa (H)	1–1		
2023–24	Prishtina 01	MR	(Finland) Kampuksen Dynamo	6–0		
2023–24	Prishtina 01	MR	(Lithuania) Kauno Žalgiris (H)	0–0		
2023–24	Prishtina 01	MR	(Cyprus) AEL Limassol	8–2		
2023–24	Prishtina 01	ER (H)	(Kazakhstan) Kairat	2–11		
2023–24	Prishtina 01	ER (H)	(Slovenia) Dobovec	3–3		
2023–24	Prishtina 01	ER (H)	(Portugal) Benfica	1–10		

=== Overall record of Kosovo in the UEFA Futsal Champions League ===
Overall	PPs	GP	W	D	L	GF	GA	GD	PTs
Total	9	44	19	8	17	174	158	+16	65

=== Kosovo national futsal team ===
Kosovo has so far participated in three international tournaments. First at the Futsal Week 2016, an international futsal tournament. They won this tournament after beating Finland and Turkey in the Groupstage. They also participated at the 2021 Continental Futsal Championship in Thailand, in which they could not get past the Groupstage.

Tournament	Round	Pos	Pld	W	D	L	GF	GA
(Croatia) 2016 Futsal Week Tournament	Champions	1st	4	3	0	1	17	7
(Thailand) 2021 Continental Futsal Championship	Group stage	4th	3	0	1	2	10	14
(Croatia) 2023 April Cup Futsal Week	Group stage	3rd	2	0	1	1	5	10
Total	1 title	3/3	9	3	2	4	32	31

== Basketball ==
The first basketball championship was held in 1991 with eight participating teams. The first champion was KB Prishtina.

The Basketball Federation of Kosovo was accepted as a full member of FIBA on 13 March 2015. Kosovo took first part in the EuroBasket qualification for the first time in 2017. Kosovo would secure their first ever win against North Macedonia in their debut, winning with 72–68 at home. Kosovo would win once more during the Pre-Qualifiers, against Estonia, finishing with a (2–2) record and advancing to the second round of World Cup qualifying. In the next round, Kosovo failed to progress and did not qualify. Kosovo most recently recorded its highest win against Switzerland scoring awin with 76–49 in the qualification for the EuroBasket 2025 tournament.

The Kosovo men's national under-20 basketball team were able to qualify for the first time for the FIBA U20 EuroBasket B Division in 2025. In Group D they finished second in the standings. In the Championship Round they faced Switzerland in the Quarterfinals, resulting in a loss for Kosovo. Kosovo finished the tournament in 8th place.

Since 2013, five teams from Kosovo KB Prishtina, KB Peja, KB Trepça, KB Bashkimi and KB Rahoveci have participated in the Balkan International Basketball League (BIBL).

The Kosovo Basketball Federation organizes competitions in different categories for men and women. The main league is called the ETC Super League. The Kosovo Basketball Federation also manages the Cup of Kosovo competition. Participating teams in the ETC Super League are: Prishtina, Peja, Trepça, Bashkimi, KB Drita, KB Besa, RTV 21, and Kastrioti.

KB Prishtina is the most successful basketball team in Kosovo. They have been crowned champions of the Kosovo Basketball Superleague 14 times. They also won the Kosovo Cup 15 times, most recently in 2020. KB Prishtina has also won the Kosovo Supercup seven times so far. KB Prishtina successfully won the Balkan International Basketball League three times: first in 2014–15 and for the second time in 2015–16. They would win it for a record third time in the 2023–24 BIBL season.

Prishtina made their debut in European Basketball at the FIBA Europe Cup in 2015–16. They were able to qualify for the playoffs for the first time in 2018–19. KB Ylli is the most recent club who represented Kosovo at the 2022–23 FIBA Europe Cup. KB Prishtina also made its debut in the European North Basketball League (ENBL). They qualified for the Quarterfinals during the 2022–23 European North Basketball League.

In the Basketball Champions League Kosovo made its debut with KB Prishtina in the 2017–18. In 2018-19 KB Prishtina were able to secure Kosovo's first ever win at this competition. They went on to miss the second round of the qualification stage. The Kosovo Basketball Superleague ranks 35th in Europe at the Basketball Champions League. In 2024, Trepça became the first Kosovan club to achieve a win in the BCL Qualifiers by defeating the Cypriot champion Keravnos but lost against the Czech champion Nymburk in the next round.

The women's basketball club Univerziteti Prishtina began competing in the 1970s and '80s in the Yugoslav Women's Basketball League. They participated with success at the WABA League in 2003–04, in which they qualified for the Final Four after finishing third in the regular season. They faced Šibenik Jolly JBS in the semifinals but did not advance to the finals.

== Judo ==
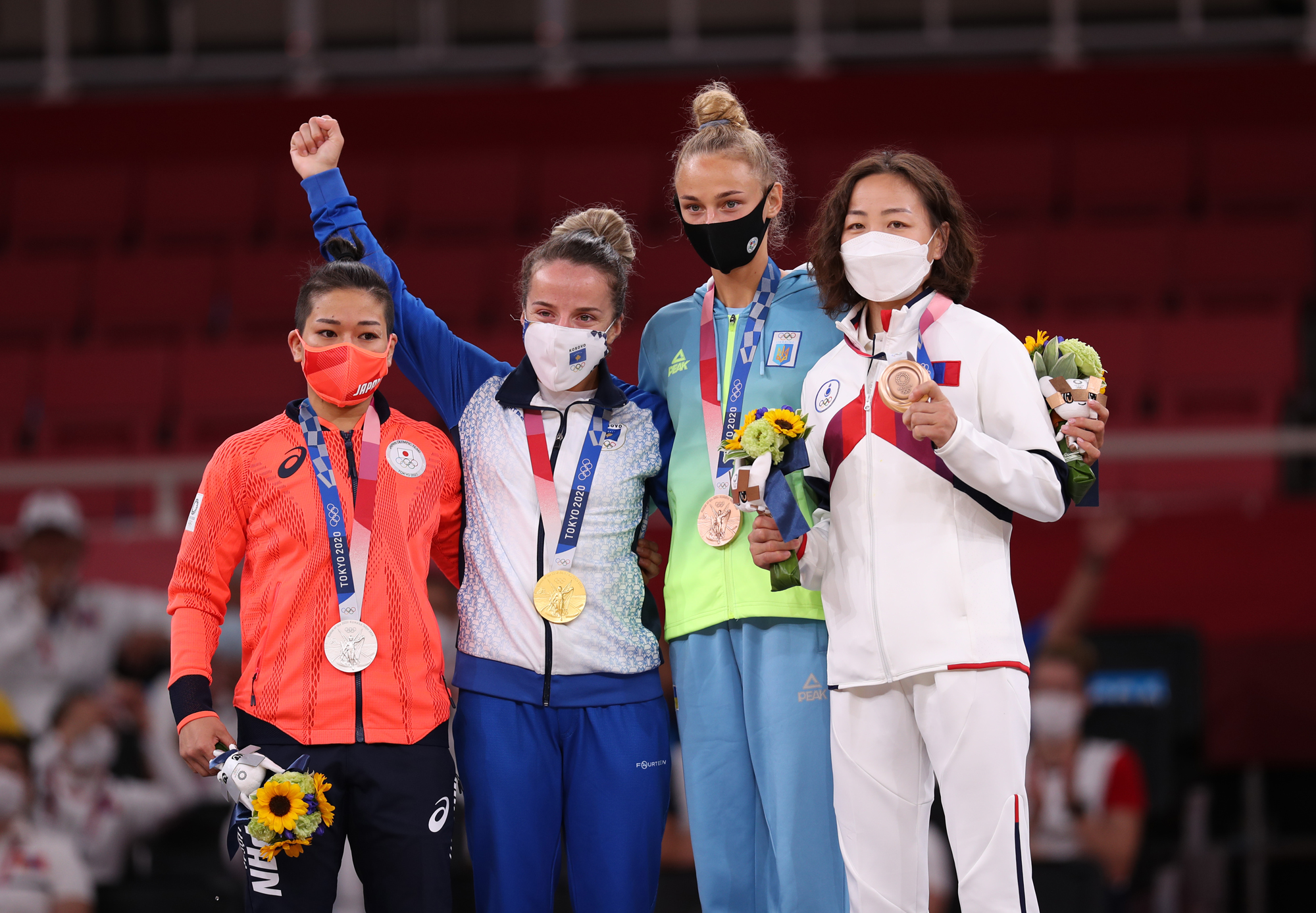
Kosovan Judoka Distria Krasniqi holding the gold medal she won at the 2020 Olympics in Tokyo in the Women's 48 kg category.

The Judo Federation of Kosovo organizes games and competitions in the country. The Kosovo Judo Federation was accepted in 2012 as a full member of the International Judo Federation. Presently, there are 12 clubs active across Kosovo.

Judo is the sport in which Kosovo has been most successful internationally. At the European Judo Championships the Kosovan judokas have won 28 medals (10 gold 4 silver and 14 bronze), since their first participation in 2014. Kosovo would be the most successful European Country at this sport in the 2021 European Judo Championships held in Lisbon, They would win two gold medals by male Judoka Akil Gjakova and Distria Krasniqi by the women, ranking Kosovo first in the medal tables. Kosovo broke a record after winning four medals at the 2023 European Judo Championships held in Montpellier in which they won one silver and three bronze medals. In the World Judo Championships they won one gold medal in 2013 and 6 bronze as well. Kosovo has also secured medals in Judo at the Mediterranean Games: 6 gold, 1 silver and 2 bronze since their debut in 2018 Tarragona.

Kosovo organized its first self-hosted Judo event as the 2023 European Judo Championships Open. Kosovo finished this event with Akil Gjakova winning the gold medal in the Lightweight (−73 kg) discipline and fellow Dardan Cena winning bronze, followed by Nora Gjakova and Distria Krasniqi who won the bronze medal as well in the Lightweight women's category.

The most successful judoka is Driton Kuka, who was a champion for many years. He won the bronze medal at the European Championship in 1990, and the World Cup in Hungary in 1991. Kuka now works with Majlinda Kelmendi, a former judoka from Peja who represented Kosovo in all judo competitions. Kelmendi won the gold medal at the 2009 World Junior Championships in Paris, France. She finished the fifth in the 2010 World Junior Championships in Morocco, and ninth in the 52 kg category at the 2010 World Judo Championships in Tokyo, Japan. However, she was not allowed to represent Kosovo at the 2012 Summer Olympics in London due to the resistance of the International Olympic Committee and the United Nations. Kelmendi gave Kosovo its first judo world title on 27 August 2013, as she beat Érika Miranda, a Brazilian judoka in the 52-kilogram gold medal match in Rio de Janeiro. In 2013, she was ranked first in the international rankings by the International Judo Federation in the 52 kg category. Kelmendi would defend her title again at the 2014 World Judo Championships – Women's 52 kg in which she won gold at the finals. In her same year she became also a European Judo Champion in Montpellier, France, after beating in the finals Russian Natalia Kuziutina. Her next Triumph prior to the Summer Olympics came at the 2016 European Judo Championships in Russia defeating in the Women's 52 kg gold medal match, French judoka Priscilla Gneto, winning her second gold medal at the European Judo Championships for Kosovo. She then would go on to win Kosovo's first ever Olympic medal at the 2016 Summer Olympics in the Women's 52 kg category after beating in a close final Odette Giuffrida, to secure her first ever gold medal for her country at this competition. Kelmendi than go on to win gold for the third time at the 2017 European Judo Championships in Warsaw in Poland. It is followed by her fourth and final gold medal win at the 2019 European Games after winning the finals against Natalia Kuziutina to secure Kosovo first ever gold medal at the European Games in their history. She competed for her second time and final time at the 2020 Summer Olympics in which she lost in the second round to Hungarian Réka Pupp. She retired with four European Judo Championships, two World Judo Championships and one Judo Olympic gold medal for her country.

Kosovo competed at the 2016 Summer Olympics. Majlinda Kelmendi would win gold in Judo at the 2016 Summer Olympics – Women's 52 kg. This was the first Olympic medal for Kosovo in their history. Distria Krasniqi win the first golden medal for Kosovo in Judo at the 2020 Summer Olympics – Women's 48 kg. Nora Gjakova won the second gold medal at the 2020 Summer Olympics.

Event	1st	2nd	3rd
Olympic Games	3	1	1
World Judo Championships	1	1	7
European Judo Championships	11	4	14
European Judo Open Championships	1	0	3
European Games	1	1	2
Mediterranean Games	6	1	2
Jeux de la Francophonie	3	0	1
Youth Olympic Games	0	0	2
Kosovo at the European Youth Olympics	0	0	1
Kosovo at the Universiade	0	1	0
Total	26	9	33

=== Medalists for Kosovo at the Summer Olympics in Judo ===
Medal	Name	Games	Sport	Event
Gold	Majlinda Kelmendi	2016 Rio de Janeiro	Judo	Women's 52 kg
Gold	Distria Krasniqi	2020 Tokyo	Judo	Women's 48 kg
Gold	Nora Gjakova	2020 Tokyo	Judo	Women's 57 kg
Silver	Distria Krasniqi	2024 Paris	Judo	Women's 52 kg
Bronze	Laura Fazliu	2024 Paris	Judo	Women's 63 kg

== Boxing ==
Boxing is a popular sport in Kosovo. Many Kosovan boxers competed in the past for either Yugoslavia or for other nations, such as Luan Krasniqi being the 1996 European Boxing Champion and Olympic bronze medalist for Germany, or Arnold Gjergjaj. Robin Krasniqi who is born in Istog in Kosovo, competes for Germany. He held the IBO light-heavyweight and WBA interim light-heavyweight championship.

Aziz Salihu is the most successful boxer in Kosovo. He won eight Yugoslav championships in which of them five were consecutive. Aziz would win two bronze medals at the European Championships in 1981 and 1985. He won bronze at the 1984 Summer Olympics in the super heavyweight category. He competed at the 1987 Boxing World Cup held in and won the bronze medal in super heavyweight. Aziz would win gold in boxing at the 1987 Mediterranean Games. Aziz Salihu became the first Kosovan to compete for the third time for Yugoslavia in boxing at the 1988 Summer Olympics.

Sami Buzoli is a boxer who boxed for Prishtina. He competed for Yugoslavia for the first time at the European Championships in 1981. He reached the finals in the Bantamweight category, in which he lost against Viktor Miroshnichenko. At the European Championships in 1983, he won silver. He also competed at the World Boxing Championship in 1982 Munich, in which he would win bronze in the Bantamweight category.

Mehmet Bogujevci is a well known boxer in Kosovo and Yugoslavia. He won five boxing Championships for Prishtina in Yugoslavia. At the European Championships in 1977 Halle he would win bronze in light welterweight. He would compete at the World Boxing Championship in 1978 Belgrad in which he would win silver in light welterweight. One year later he would win gold in boxing at the Mediterranean Games in 1979 Split. Mehmet Bogujevci became the first individual athlete from Kosovo to compete for Yugoslavia at the Olympics at the 1980 Summer Olympics in the men's welterweight category, reaching the quarterfinals, his sole participation at the Summer Olympics for Yugoslavia.

Besim Kabashi is a kickboxer in Kosovo and Germany. He boxed between 1997 and 2002 in the light heavyweight and super heavyweight divisions, winning in his debut year the WKA German Light Heavyweight title. He would return to beat Zoran Dorcic to become the WKA European Super Heavyweight Champion in 2007. Besim would then beat Yahya Gülay to become WKA World Heavyweight in 2008. He defended his title three more years, before his death in 2011. In his career he lost only one of his 66 fights.

Donjeta Sadiku is a well known female boxer from Prishtina. Donjeta made her debut for Kosovo at the 2020 Summer Olympics in Tokyo in the Women's lightweight discipline. Being the first Boxer from Kosovo to represent her country. Sadiku won the bronze medal at the 2022 IBA Women's World Boxing Championships in Istanbul. She won the first medal for Kosovo in the Boxing World Championship. She would follow her medal drain after winning again the bronze medal at the Women's European Boxing Championships in 2022 Budva. The first medal for Kosovo after 35 Years in this competition. She recently wrote history for Kosovo after qualifying directly to the 2024 Summer Olympics by beating in the Olympic Qualification Tournament four opponents. In the first round she defeated Shona Whitwell with 5-0 after that she was able to beat Greek boxer Christina Linardatou confidently with 5–0. Donjeta secured the finals after beating the German Maria Felicitas Ganglbauer once more with 5–0. She become the first boxer from Kosovo to qualify to the Olympic Games in boxing directly after beating in the finals Alessia Mesiano. This is the second sport in which Kosovo achieved this feat so far at the Olympic Games.

Kosovo competed in boxing at the 2022 Mediterranean Games held in Oran. Shpejtim Bajoku secured the bronze medal in the Men's light welterweight discipline. It is the first medal for Kosovo after 31 years in boxing at the Mediterranean Games and the second sport for the country at this competition.

Event	1st	2nd	3rd
Olympic Games	0	0	1
IBA World Boxing Championships	0	1	2
Boxing World Cup	1	0	1
European Boxing Championships	0	2	6
Mediterranean Games	4	2	4
Total	5	5	14

=== Medalists from Kosovo at the Summer Olympics in Boxing ===
Medal	Name	Games	Sport	Event
Bronze	Aziz Salihu	1984 Los Angeles	Boxing	Super heavyweight

== Handball ==
Sport in Kosovo
Medal record

IHF Emerging Nations Championship
Bronze medal – third place	2015 Kosovo	
Bronze medal – third place	2017 Bulgaria	

Small handball (modern handball) was introduced in 1950–1951. Handball teams succeeded in joining the first and second leagues in the former Yugoslavia, which at that time (1970–1980) was among the strongest leagues in the world. Teams such as Borci, Prishtina and Trepca reached the first league of the former Yugoslavia. Some of the players that played for the Yugoslav national team were Aziz Makiqi, Hasan Bajrami, and Tahir Sojeva.

From 13–23 October 1979 the women's World Junior Championships were held in Kosovo. The participants were: Austria, USSR, Denmark, France, the Netherlands, Hungary, Italy, Japan, Yugoslavia, Norway, DR Germany, FR Germany and the United States.

After the Kosovo War, many attempts were made for the internationalization of handball however this did not happen until 18 December 2004, when Kosovo handball federation was accepted in the European Handball Federation with conditional rights. After that year, Kosovo's teams such as KH Prishtina, KH Besa Famiglia, KH Kastrioti and KH Trepça participated in European competitions.

Presently in Kosovo there is a handball super league (major league), as well as a first league, juniors' league, and cadets' league in both the women's and men's categories. Participating clubs in the super league are: Besa Famgas, Prishtina, Kosova, Kastrioti, Zhegra, Drenica, Vëllaznimi, Trepça, Samadrexha, Llapi, and Drita.

The greatest success so far was achieved in the Cell Cup tournament in Hungary in 2013, where the Kosovo U18 team took second place in a competition with teams from across Europe. Kosovo would host the 2019 IHF Inter-Continental Trophy in Prishtina. The Kosovo U21 men's handball national team were able to win this competition and qualify for the first time to the IHF Men's Junior World Championship in 2019 Spain. They became the first national team in Kosovo to qualify for a world championship, in any team sport.

At the 2025 IHF Inter-Continental Trophy held in Prishtina, the Kosovo U18 National team were able to secure a spot for the 2025 IHF Men's U19 Handball World Championship in Egypt. At the 2025 IHF Men's U19 Handball World Championship Kosovo faced Switzerland, Hungary and Morocco in the Preliminary round. They finished third in the group. Kosovo would finish this Tournament in 24th place.

The Kosovo Women's U18 secured a spot at the IHF Women's Youth World Championship. After winning the 2024 IHF Inter-Continental Trophy they secured Kosovo's second participation. They participated at the 2024 Women's Youth World Handball Championship held in China and ranked 23rd.

The Kosovo men's national handball team is a recognized member in the EHF and IHF, since 2014.

Kosovo would host its first handball tournament when the 2015 IHF Emerging Nations Championship was held in Prishtina. They won bronze in their debut participation. Followed by their second participation were they won another bronze medal at the 2017 IHF Emerging Nations Championship held in Bulgaria. Their first Team Sport success for the country in their young handball history.

At the 2021 World Men's Handball Championship – European qualification tournament, Kosovo drew with Italy 26–26 and defeated Georgia 30–21 to take second place, behind Romania, in the qualifying group, but were not able to progress to the second phase of qualifying.

== Volleyball ==
The first volleyball championship was held in Pristina from 24–26 October 1948, with six teams participating: Proleteri, Buduçnosti, Trepça, Borac, Metohia, and Brastvo. During 1966–1967, four teams from Kosovo took part in the second division of the league of former Yugoslavia. In 1990 KV Prishtina-Elektroekonomia took part in qualification to enter the first division of the former Yugoslavia but did not succeed. The first League of Women was organized in 1975. Today the Volleyball Federation of Kosovo organizes competitions both men and women. Teams participating in Superleague of Kosovo are: Theranda, KV Drenica, KV R&Rukolli, KV Besa, KV Luboteni, KV Ferizaji.

== Athletics ==
Athletics (also known as track and field) is a group of sports that includes running, walking, jumping, and throwing. The Athletics Federation of Kosovo is an association of athletes and their clubs that organize sports competitions. It was founded on 25 September 1991 in Pristina. Some of the main responsibilities of the federation are to promote athletics in Kosovo, lead the development of athletics, coordinate the progress of the quality of athletics, and to adapt and implement short and long curriculum development in athletics. There are 13 active clubs.

In the 2023 Jeux de la Francophonie Kosovo was able to secure its first medals in athletics. Gresa Bakraqi won silver in the 3000m steeplechase with a time of 10:48,25. Muhamet Ramadani won the second silver medal.

Kosovo would make their debut internationally at the 2019 European Youth Summer Olympic Festival held in Baku. Muhamet Ramadani would win gold in shot put. Kosovo ended the competition ranked 26th. Kosovo ranked 15th in the 2021 European Athletics U20 Championships Muhamet Ramadani secured a bronze in the 2023 European Athletics U23 Championships. It was his first medal win at those games.

== Karate ==
Karate in Kosovo is rising in popularity. The 2021 Male Championship was won by Argjend Berjani from Klubi Prishtina. The Female Championship winner was Antoneta Butakova from Klubi Prishtina.

Herolind Nishevci is a known Karateka born in Pristina. He won two bronze medals in his career. He won in the 2016 World Karate Championships bronze in the +84 Category. This was the first medal won for Kosovo at the World Karate Championships. He also won the bronze medal at the 2021 European Karate Championships in Poreč in the same category.

== Tennis ==
KT Prishtina was founded on 27 June 1992 and is the oldest club in Kosovo. KT Trepca was founded on 15 July 2003 and has its own tennis school. There are currently ten active clubs in Kosovo. Kosovo is a member of the International Tennis Federations (ITF).

Kosovo became the 50th member of Tennis Europe on 28 March 2015. which became effective in 2016. They made their debut at the 2016 Davis Cup in the Europe Zone Group D III.

Female tennis players have been representing Kosovo at the Billie Jean King Cup since 2016. As of 2023 they were 52nd in the world rankings.

The most successful tennis player from Kosovo is Adrijana Lekaj. Other known players are Donika Bashota who won two doubles titles in 2013 and Arlinda Rushiti who achieved the most wins for Kosovo at the Billie Jean King Cup with 13–13.

== Rugby ==
The governing body for rugby in Kosovo is the Kosovo Rugby Federation which was founded in 2018 and became a member of Rugby Europe on 3 December 2021. The Kosovo national rugby sevens team made its debut in an international rugby event at the Men's Sevens Conference 2 tournament on 11 June 2022 in Malta.

R.K Qikat is Kosovos first all-female rugby sevens team. They have entered regional competitions since 2017, and have a youth program for children under 12, in cooperation with the men's team. They have contributed to the path towards recognition of Kosovo Rugby Association by the World Rugby Organization and IOC.

== Disability sports ==
The Paralympic Committee of Kosovo gained provisional membership of the International Paralympic Committee in July 2022 and a team representing Kosovo made its debut at the Paralympic Games in 2024.

Special Olympics Kosovo was founded in 2002. Athletes from Kosovo first took part in the 2003 Special Olympics World Summer Games held in Dublin. This was the first time a team represented Kosovo at an international multisport event. Kosovo has participated in every Special Olympics World Summer Games since 2003 and Special Olympics World Winter Games since 2013. Their first medals came at the 2019 Special Olympics in Abu Dhabi, in which the Kosovan delegation won three medals: one gold and two bronze.

== Traditional sports ==
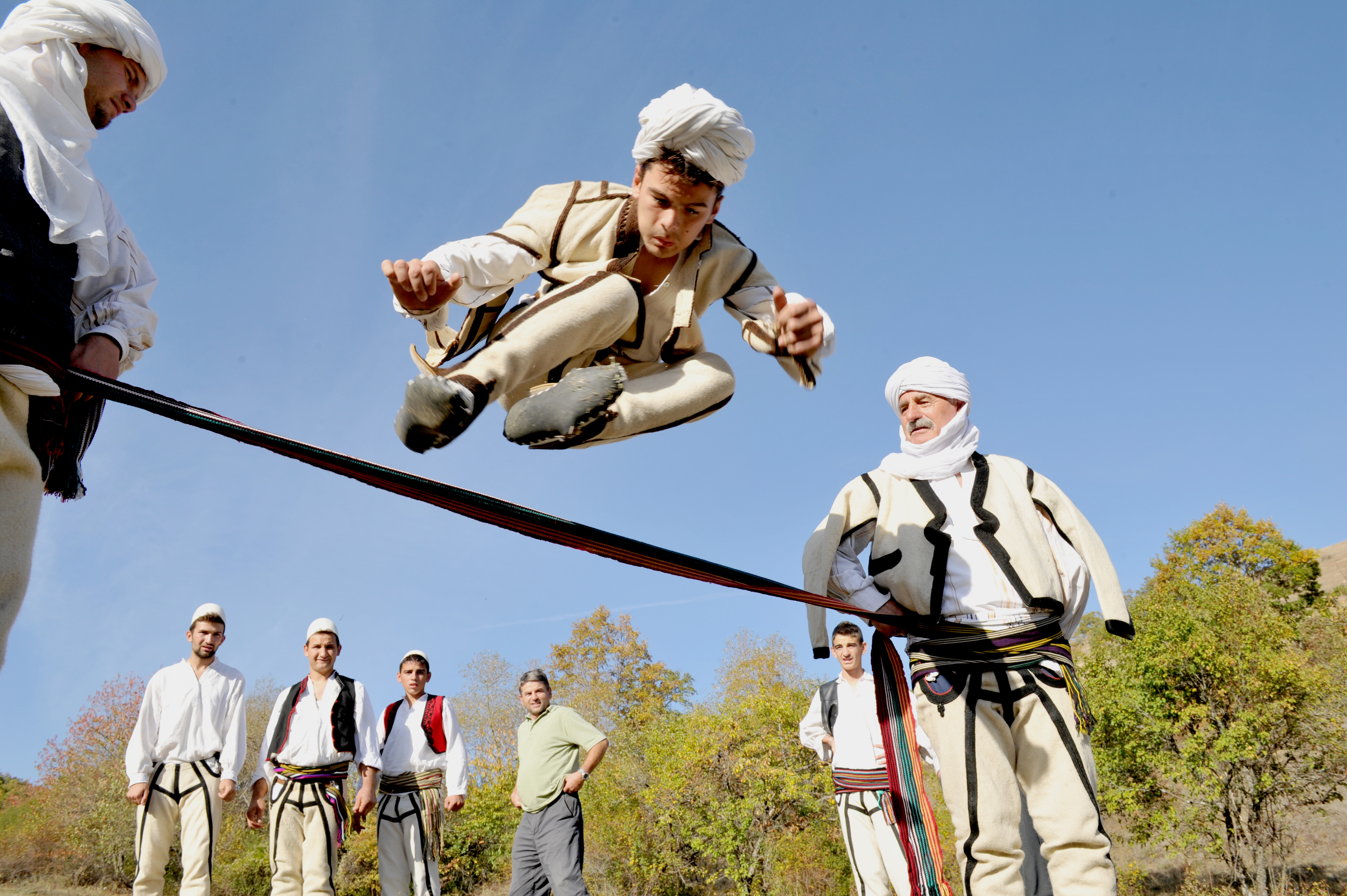
Young and old people playing traditional sports.

Albaniada is an event that celebrates traditional sports. The main goal of this event is to 'bring back to life' games and sports that have been traditionally played in Albania.

Some of the traditional sports are hats (Kapuça), measure and stick (Kut e Kleçkë), crouch (Guxhas), ball-on-horse (top-n-kali), arm wrestling (rrëzim i duarve), bag hopping (vrapim me thes), leg wrestling (rrëzim i këmbëve), boards (rrasash), capture the handkerchief (kapja e shamise), rope pull (tërheqja e litarit), stone throwing sideways (gurapesh me dy duar anash), overhead stone throwing (gurapesh prapa), single-hand stone throwing and swords (Shpatash). These kinds of sports can be played in an indoor environment like Oda or outside.

== Sports fan clubs ==
=== Plisat ===
Plisat
- Founded: 1987; 39 years ago
- Arena: Fadil Vokrri Stadium
- Location: Pristina, Kosovo
- Team colors: White and blue

This fan club was founded in 1987 by the supporters of FC Prishtina. They got their name from the traditional Albanian cap called Plis. Usually, the members of Plisat stay in the east stand of the Pristina City Stadium while supporting their team in football. They are popularly known as "the 12th player" of FC Prishtina because of the massive support they provide during the games – no matter if losing or winning. In the early 1980s they made notable travels to Čačak, but particularly notable was when, in 1983, more than 7000 supporters followed FC Prishtina to the Marakana stadium in Belgrade in the club's historical victory over Red Star Belgrade in the at-the-time strong Yugoslav First League.

Besides supporting the football team, after the Kosovo War, Plisat also began backing their basketball team, Sigal Prishtina, as well as local handball teams. Over time, they developed a distinctive style of support, featuring coordinated chants and elaborate choreographies in the stands of the city stadium in Pristina. Today, Plisat are regarded as the most prominent fan club in Kosovo.

=== Torcida ===
Torcida Mitrovicë
- Established: 20 March 1984; 42 years ago
- Arena: Adem Jashari Olympic Stadium, Minatori Sports Hall
- Location: Mitrovica, Kosovo
- Team colors: Green and black
- Affiliation: (Albania) Tifozat Kuq e Zi

Trepça's main supporters are Torcida Mitrovicë. They were officially founded by Shefqet Begu (also known as Qeti) on 20 March 1984. Torcida Mitrovicë are considered to be the oldest Albanian ultras.

=== Shqiponjat ===
Shqiponjat
- Founded: 1993; 33 years ago
- Dissolved: 2022
- Arena: Karagaq Sports Hall; Peja
- Location: Peja, Kosovo
- Team colors: Black and yellow

Shqiponjat (English:The Eagles) fan club was founded on 13 December 1993, in Peja. This fan club got their name from the symbol of the Albanian mountains – the Albanian Eagle. They supported the Peja teams like KF Besa in football, KB Peja in basketball and KH Besa in handball.

=== Intelektualët ===
Intelektualët
- Founded: 1998; 28 years ago
- Type: Ultras group
- Team: All clubs with name Drita from Gjilan
- Motto: No one likes us, we don't care
- Location: Gjilan, Kosovo
- Arena: Gjilan City Stadium
- Colors
- Affiliations: BKHooligans, Bojanina Blue Boys, Brigada 138, DH-B Hools, E7 Hools, Hienat, PM Mahalla, Q.Q Hools, ULH and GC Hools

This fan club got this name (English:The Intellectuals) after the club was founded in 1947 by the intellectuals and the society of the city in Gjilan. They support all of the ten clubs that share the name Drita. The colors that characterize this fan club are white and blue, as those are the colors all clubs named Drita use.

Nowadays, Intelektualët are the biggest and most active tifo groups after the war.

=== Arpagjik't ===
Arpagjik't
- Founded: 2000; 26 years ago
- Arena: "Përparim Thaçi" Stadium, Prizren
- Location: Prizren, Kosovo
- Team colors: Black and orange

The fan clubs in Prizren started when the local football club, KF Liria, played in the Yugoslav Second League. People from the city organized with traditional songs, costumes and traditional dances, and headed to the local stadium now called Përparim Thaçi to support their football club at that time.

After the war in Kosovo, their presence in the matches became regular, and the fans started to call themselves Arpagjik't. After the first season, the groups Arpagjik't and The Panthers merged under one same name – Arpagjik't.

The first flag for the Panthers was prepared in 2001, measuring 20 by 7 meters, on which was written "Go Bashkimi, Go Panthers". The first days under the name Arpagjik't were very successful because the fan club distributed over 400 fan membership cards, with which the fans could watch the matches without paying anything.

Skifterat
- Founded: 1999; 27 years ago
- Type: Supporters' group
- Club: SC Gjilani
- Location: Gjilan
- Stadium: Gjilan City Stadium
- Colours

=== Skifterat ===
Skifterat (English 'Falcons'), was founded in September 1999 in the city of Gjilan.

Their colours are red and white and they support SC Gjilani. The name Skifterat ('Falcons') is a tribute to a battalion of soldiers within the KLA, where most of the soldiers were from the city of Gjilan.

== International sports membership ==
Kosovo was a part of several international sports federations in the 1990s and has applied to become a member of many more after its 17 February 2008 unilateral declaration of independence from Serbia. Currently, Kosovo federations are full members of seven international federations, provisional members of four international federations, associated members of two international federations and members of one European federation. On 22 October 2014, the International Olympic Committee announced that it had granted provisional recognition to the Kosovo Olympic Committee and proposed that it be granted full recognition at the IOC Session to be held in December 2014. On 8 December 2014, the Olympic Committee of Kosovo became a full member of International Olympic Committee. The acceptance of Kosovo in the International Olympic Committee can have a significant positive impact in accepting other sport federations in the international level.

The International Committee of Mediterranean Games launched the bidding process for the 2030 Mediterranean Games at a meeting of its executive committee held on 10 December 2022 in Pristina. In April 2023, the International Committee of Mediterranean Games (CIJM) announced the end of the candidature process and the sole candidate city, Pristina, for the 2030 Games. Pristina was confirmed as the host city on 8 September 2023 during the ICMG General Assembly with 55 votes in favour, eight against and three abstentions. It will be the second time only that these games are organized in the Western Balkans, following the 1979 Mediterranean Games in Split when it was then Yugoslavia.

== Kosovo in international competitions ==
- Kosovo at the Olympics
- Kosovo at the Paralympics
- Kosovo at the Youth Olympics
- Kosovo at the European Youth Olympic Festival
- Kosovo at the Mediterranean Games
- Kosovo at the European Games
- Kosovo at the Jeux de la Francophonie
- Kosovo at the Universiade
- Kosovo at the World Games

=== Kosovo's total Medal overview ===
Games	Gold	Silver	Bronze	Total
Olympic Games	3	1	2	6
European Games	2	1	2	5
Mediterranean Games	11	6	11	28
Jeux de la Francophonie	3	2	1	6
Youth Olympics	0	0	2	2
European Youth Olympic Festival	1	0	1	2
Kosovo at the Universiade	0	1	0	1
Total	20	11	19	50

=== Medals won by Sport ===
Sport	Gold	Silver	Bronze	Total
Judo	13	5	13	31
Boxing	4	2	5	11
Karate	2	0	0	2
Athletics	1	2	0	3
Weightlifting	0	2	0	2
Wrestling	0	0	1	1
Total	20	11	19	50

== See also ==
- List of national sports teams of Kosovo
