= Kosovo at the Jeux de la Francophonie =

- IOC code: KOS
- NOC: Olympic Committee of Kosovo
- Website: http://www.noc-kosovo.org/
- Medals: Gold 3 Silver 2 Bronze 1 Total 6

Jeux de la Francophonie appearances (overview)
- 1989-2013; 2017; 2023

Kosovo became an associate member of the Organisation internationale de la Francophonie in 2014 and subsequently made its debut at the Jeux de la Francophonie in 2017.

== Medal count ==
Kosovo first competed in the Jeux de la Francophonie in 2017.

Games	Athletes	Gold	Silver	Bronze	Total
(Ivory Coast) Abidjan 2017 (details)		2	0	0	2
(Democratic Republic of the Congo) 2023 Kinshasa (details)	6	1	2	1	4
(Armenia) 2027 Yerevan (details)	Future event				
Total		3	2	1	6

=== By sport ===
Sport	Gold	Silver	Bronze	Total
Athletics	0	2	0	2
Judo	3	0	1	4
Total	3	2	1	6

== List of medallists ==
Medal	Name(s)	Games	Sport	Event
Gold	Akil Gjakova	(Ivory Coast) 2017 Abidjan	Judo	Men's 73 kg
Gold	Distria Krasniqi	(Ivory Coast) 2017 Abidjan	Judo	Women's 52 kg
Gold	Shpat Zekaj	(Democratic Republic of the Congo) 2023 Kinshasa	Judo	Men's 100 kg
Silver	Gresa Bakraqi	(Democratic Republic of the Congo) 2023 Kinshasa	Athletics	3000 m steeplechase
Silver	Muhamet Ramadani	(Democratic Republic of the Congo) 2023 Kinshasa	Athletics	Shot put
Bronze	Dardan Cena	(Democratic Republic of the Congo) 2023 Kinshasa	Judo	Men's 73 kg

== See also ==
- Kosovo at the Olympics
- Kosovo at the Youth Olympics
- Kosovo at the European Games
- Kosovo at the Mediterranean Games
- Kosovo at the Universiade
- Sport in Kosovo
