= Kosovo at the Mediterranean Games =

- IOC code: KOS
- NOC: Olympic Committee of Kosovo
- Medals Ranked 21st: Gold 8 Silver 4 Bronze 7 Total 19

Mediterranean Games appearances (overview)
- 1951; 1955; 1959; 1963; 1967; 1971; 1975; 1979; 1983; 1987; 1991; 1993; 1997; 2001; 2005; 2009; 2013; 2018; 2022; 2026

Other related appearances
- Yugoslavia (1951–1991); Serbia and Montenegro (1997–2005); Serbia (2009–pres.)

Kosovo first appeared at the quadrennial Mediterranean Games event in 2018. Kosovo had declared independence from Serbia in 2008. The Olympic committee of Kosovo was recognised by the International Olympic Committee six years later in December 2014.

Since their first appearance at the 2018 Mediterranean Games in Tarragona, Kosovo athletes won ten medals, in which of them, nine in judo and two medals in Boxing. Followed by an Gold Medal in Karate at the Mediterranean Games and two Silber Medals in Weightlifting at the 2026 Mediterranean Games.

As of 2026, Kosovan athletes have won a total of 19 medals. The country's ranking in the history of the Games is the 21st place respectively.

Kosovo's capital, Pristina, was confirmed as the host city for the 2030 Mediterranean Games by the International Committee of Mediterranean Games on 8 September 2023.

== Overview ==
=== By event ===
Host country

Games	Athletes	Gold	Silver	Bronze	Total	Rank
1951–1991	Competed as part of Yugoslavia					
1991–2005	Competed as part of Serbia and Montenegro					
(Italy) 2009 Pescara	Did not participate					
(Turkey) 2013 Mersin	Did not participate					
(Spain) 2018 Tarragona	40	3	1	0	4	14
(Algeria) 2022 Oran	38	3	0	3	6	16
(Italy) 2026 Taranto	163	2	3	4	9	15
(Kosovo) 2030 Prishtina	Future Event					
Total		8	4	7	19	21

=== By sport ===
Sport	Gold	Silver	Bronze	Total
Judo	6	2	6	14
Boxing	1	0	1	2
Karate	1	0	0	1
Weightlifting	0	2	0	2
Total	8	4	7	19

== Athletes with most medals ==
The Kosovan athletes who won the most medals in the history of the Mediterranean Games is Judoka Distria Krasniqi, who won two Gold medals for Kosovo. The other Judokas in this list are Loriana Kuka and Akil Gjakova.

Athlete	Sport	Games	Gold medal	Silver medal	Bronze medal	Total
Distria Krasniqi	Judo	2022, 2018	2	0	0	2
Loriana Kuka	Judo	2022, 2018	1	1	0	2
Akil Gjakova	Judo	2022, 2018, 2026	1	0	2	3
Laura Fazliu	Judo	2022, 2026	1	1	0	2
Kianoush Rostami	Weightlifting	2026	0	2	0	2
Flaka Loxha	Judo	2022, 2026	0	0	2	2

Notes: athletes in bold are still active.

== List of medalists ==
=== 2018 Mediterranean Games ===
Medal	Name	Sport	Event	Date
Gold	Distria Krasniqi	Judo	Women's 52 kg	June 27
Gold	Nora Gjakova	Judo	Women's 57 kg	June 27
Gold	Akil Gjakova	Judo	Men's 73 kg	June 28
Silver	Loriana Kuka	Judo	Women's 78 kg	June 29

=== 2022 Mediterranean Games ===
Medal	Name	Sport	Event	Date
Gold	Distria Krasniqi	Judo	Women's 52 kg	29 June
Gold	Laura Fazliu	Judo	Women's 63 kg	30 June
Gold	Loriana Kuka	Judo	Women's 78 kg	1 July
Bronze	Flaka Loxha	Judo	Women's 57 kg	29 June
Bronze	Akil Gjakova	Judo	Men's 73 kg	30 June
Bronze	Shpejtim Bajoku	Boxing	Men's 63 kg	30 June

=== 2026 Mediterranean Games ===
Medal	Name	Sport	Event	Date
Gold	Donjeta Sadiku	Boxing	Women's 60 kg	August 27
Gold	Islam Selmani	Karate	Men's 60 kg	September 1
(silver) Silver	Laura Fazliu	Judo	Women's 63 kg	August 29
Silver	Kianoush Rostami	Weightlifting	Men's 95 kg - Snatch	September 2
Silver	Kianoush Rostami	Weightlifting	Men's 95 kg - Clean & Jerk	September 2
(bronze) Bronze	Fatjona Kasapi	Judo	Women's 52 kg	August 28
(bronze) Bronze	Akil Gjakova	Judo	Men's 73 kg	August 28
(bronze) Bronze	Flaka Loxha	Judo	Women's 57 kg	August 28
(bronze) Bronze	Shpati Zekaj	Judo	Men's 100 kg	August 29

== Kosovan medalists at the mediterranean Games ==
There were plenty of ethnic Albanians who did participate for Yugoslavia coming from Kosovo who would win many medals at the Mediterranean Games. In Boxing several athletes of Albanian descent such as Mehmet Bogujevci being the first ever Gold Medalist from Kosovo at the 1979 Mediterranean Games in Split, followed by Aziz Salihu who won the Gold medal At the 1987 Mediterranean Games, Agim Latifi also won Gold, followed by Fatmir Makolli who won silver in the same Edition. As well as Afrim Manjanci and Ilir Mustafa who were successful medal winners for Yugoslavia respectively. But the Kosovans were also successful by representing Albania in which Egzon Shala won bronze in the 96 Kg category in Wrestling for Albania at the 2013 Mediterranean Games in Turkey.

Sport	**Gold**	**Silver**	**Bronze**	Total
Boxing	3	2	3	**8**
Wrestling	0	0	1	**1**
Total	3	2	4	**9**

== See also ==
- Kosovo at the Olympics
- Kosovo at the European Games
- Kosovo at the Jeux de la Francophonie
- Sport in Kosovo
