= Kosovo at the Olympics =

- IOC code: KOS
- NOC: Olympic Committee of Kosovo
- Website: noc-kosovo.org
- Medals Ranked 88th: Gold 3 Silver 1 Bronze 1 Total 5

Summer appearances
- 2016; 2020; 2024; 2028

Winter appearances
- 2018; 2022; 2026

Other related appearances
- Yugoslavia (1920–1992W); Independent Olympic Participants (1992S); Serbia and Montenegro (1996–2006); Serbia (2008–2012)

Kosovo made its Olympic debut as a member state in 2016. Its team is organized by the Olympic Committee of Kosovo (OCK), created in 1992 and recognized by the International Olympic Committee on 9 December 2014. It won its first medal in its debut appearance in 2016, when judoka Majlinda Kelmendi took gold in the women's -52 kg category. In the 2020 Tokyo Olympics, Nora Gjakova won gold in the women's judo -57 kg class, and Distria Krasniqi won gold in the women's judo -48 kg class.

== History ==
In past Olympic Games, athletes born in what is now Kosovo participated as part of the Yugoslavian team. In the 1960 Summer Olympics, three football players born in Kosovo (Milutin Šoškić, Fahrudin Jusufi, and Vladimir Durković) won gold as part of the Yugoslavia national team. The first individual athlete from Kosovo who competed for Yugoslavia at the Olympics was boxer Mehmet Bogujevci in the 1980 Summer Olympics men's welterweight category, reaching the quarterfinals. In the 1984 Summer Olympics, boxer Aziz Salihu became the first individual athlete from Kosovo to win an Olympic medal, a bronze in the super heavyweight class. In the following 1988 Summer Olympics, Salihu became the first Kosovan individual athlete to participate for a third time, again in boxing. The world-renowned judo coach of Kosovo is Driton Kuka. The bronze medalist at the European Championship in 1990 and the World Cup in Hungary in 1991 was to participate for FR Yugoslavia in the 1992 Barcelona Olympics, but Kosovo pulled out its competitors because of the repression of ethnic Albanians by the regime of Slobodan Milosevic. Kosovo Albanian Luan Krasniqi won a bronze medal representing Germany in heavyweight boxing at the 1996 Summer Olympics in Atlanta. In the 2000 Summer Olympics in Sydney Taip Ramadani became the first Kosovan Team athlete to represent Australia in Handball. Another Boxer with Kosovan descent would take place, with Naim Terbunja representing Sweden at the 2008 Summer Olympics. Fatmire Alushi, who was born in Kosovo, in Istog won a bronze medal while playing on the German women's football team at the 2008 Olympics in Beijing. Kosovo-Albanian Kosovare Asllani, representing the Sweden women's national football team, won silver medals twice: first at the 2016 Summer Olympics in Rio de Janeiro and again in the 2020 Tokyo Olympics.

After the breakup of Yugoslavia, the Olympic Committee of Kosovo (OCK) was established 1992. However, only Kosovo Serb athletes participated as part of the Olympic teams of Serbia and Montenegro and Serbia. On 17 February 2008, the Kosovan Parliament declared independence from Serbia. World junior champion in judo, Majlinda Kelmendi, qualified for the 2012 Summer Olympics. She wanted to compete under the flag of Kosovo, but OCK was not recognized by the International Olympic Committee (IOC) at the time. Also, the IOC turned down Kelmendi's request to compete as an independent athlete. Kelmendi chose instead to represent Albania. In which she couldn't win the first ever medal for Albania as she lost in the Round of Sixteen of this tournament.

In April 2013, the Brussels Agreement was concluded between the Serbian and Kosovan governments. Kosovo was recognised as a provisional member of the IOC on 22 October 2014, before becoming a full member on 9 December 2014. At that time, Kosovo was not a member or observer state of the United Nations, but it had gained diplomatic recognition as a sovereign state by 108 out of 193 UN member states. Kelmendi, who had gone on to become World and European judo champion in 2013 and 2014, carried Kosovo's flag during the Parade of Nations in the opening ceremonies in both Rio 2016 and Tokyo 2020.

Serbia protested Kosovo's admission to the IOC, as it officially claims that Kosovo is an autonomous province of Serbia. However, Serbia, considering the harmful effects of Yugoslavia's expulsion in 1992, decided against boycotting the 2016 Summer Olympics as a consequence.

Kosovo competed for the first time as a recognized Olympic nation at the 2016 Summer Olympics in Rio de Janeiro. In total eight athletes competed in various sports. Kosovo won one gold medal by Kelmendi in the women's -52kg class, the first Olympic medal for Kosovo in its history. As Kosovo finished their debut in the Summer Olympics in Rio de Janeiro in the 54th place.

The Olympic Committee of Kosovo made its Winter Olympic debut at the 2018 Games in Pyeongchang. Albin Tahiri was the flag-bearer at the 2018 Winter Olympics opening ceremony.

Kosovo competed in the Tokyo Games in 2021, with five male and six female competitors. Majlinda Kelmendi and Akil Gjakova were the flag-bearers in the Parade of Nations. Kosovo won two gold medals in the 2020 Summer Olympics, both in judo. Distria Krasniqi won the first gold medal for Kosovo in women's -48kg event. Nora Gjakova won the second gold medal for Kosovo in the women's -57kg event, the third gold medal overall for Kosovo at the Olympic Games. They won their two medals after three days of this competition, ranking them 7th on the Olympic Medal table, that particular day. Kosovo finished the 2020 Summer Olympics in Tokio in the 42nd place. Their highest finish so far, as a nation.

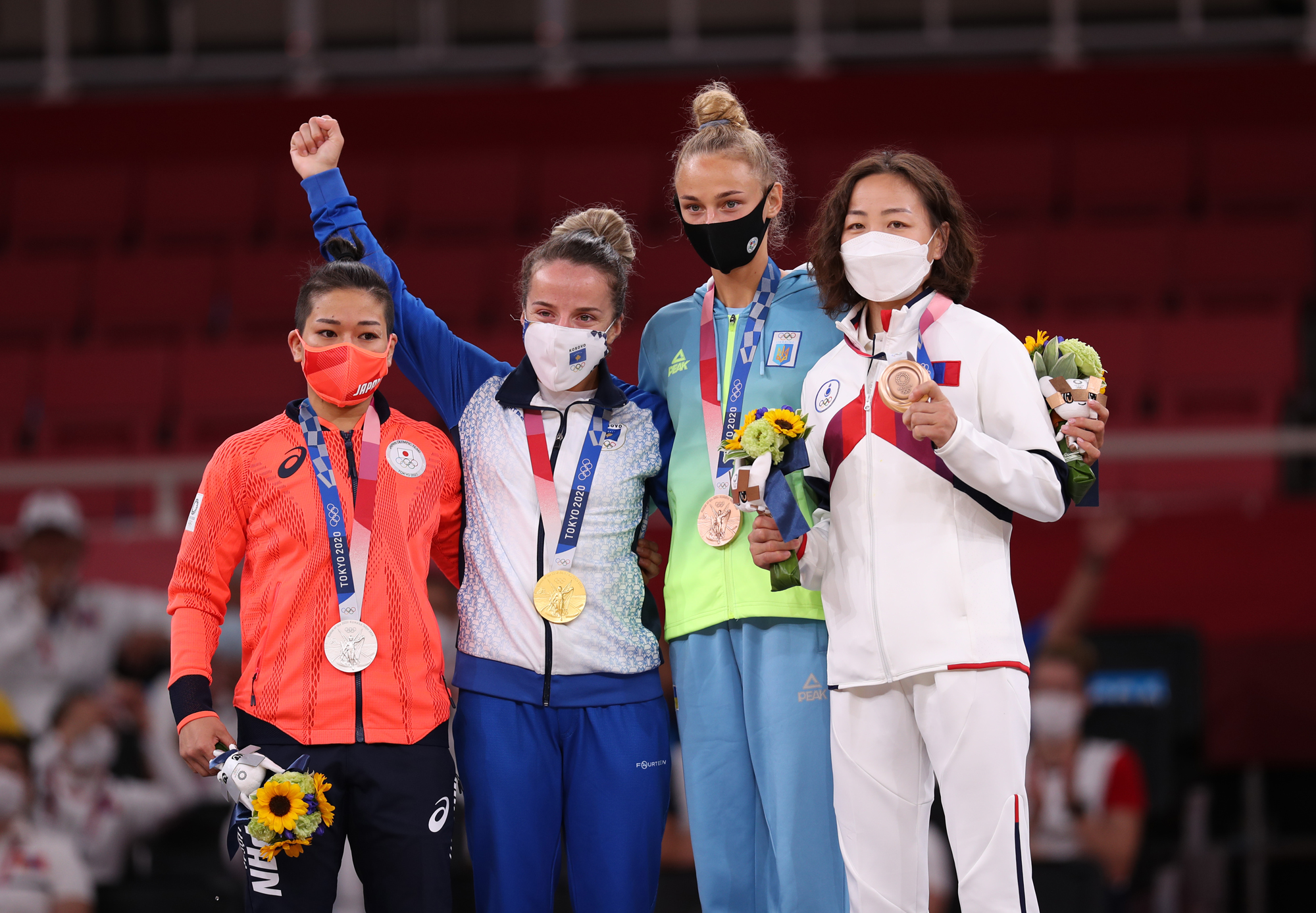
Kosovan Judoka Distria Krasniqi holding the second gold medal win for Kosovo at the 2020 Olympics in Tokyo in the Women's 48 kg category.

Kosovo competed at the 2022 Winter Olympics held in Beijing. Its Olympic team consisted of two athletes, one male and one female. Albin Tahiri competed in four alpine ski events. Kiana Kryeziu became the first woman in the history of Kosovo to compete at the Winter Olympics, in the women's giant slalom. Albin Tahiri achieved the best result for Kosovo at the Winter Olympics in the men's combined event with a 15th-place finish. His second best finish came in the men's giant slalom where he finished 30th.

In the 2024 Summer Olympics in Paris, Kosovo were able to win two more medals this time one silver and one bronze medal. Distria Krasniqi won silver in the Women's 52 kg category, her second medal at the Summer Olympics losing the final against Diyora Keldiyorova after golden score. The following medal were won by Laura Fazliu who would win the Bronze Medal in the Women's 63 kg. Kosovo so far won five Olympic medals in their three appearances at the Summer Olympics.

== Timeline of participation ==
Olympic Year/s	Teams	
1912	Kingdom of Serbia	
1920–1936	Kingdom of Yugoslavia	
1948–1992 W	Yugoslavia	
1992 S	Independent Olympic Participants	
1994		
1996–2006	FR Yugoslavia/ Serbia and Montenegro	
2008–2010	Serbia	
2012–2014	Serbia	
2016–present	Serbia	Kosovo

== Medal tables ==
=== Medals by Summer Games ===
Games	Athletes	Gold	Silver	Bronze	Total	Rank
1920–1988	as part of Yugoslavia					
1992 Barcelona	as part of Independent Olympic Participants					
1996–2004	as part of Serbia and Montenegro					
2008 Beijing	as part of Serbia					
2012 London	did not participate					
2016 Rio de Janeiro	8	1	0	0	1	54
2020 Tokyo	11	2	0	0	2	42
2024 Paris	9	0	1	1	2	73
2028 Los Angeles	future event					
2032 Brisbane	future event					
Total		3	1	1	5	88

=== Medals by Winter Games ===
Games	Athletes	Gold	Silver	Bronze	Total	Rank
1924–1992	as part of Yugoslavia					
1994 Lillehammer	did not participate					
1998–2006	as part of Serbia and Montenegro					
2010 Vancouver	as part of Serbia					
2014 Sochi	did not participate					
2018 Pyeongchang	1	0	0	0	0	–
2022 Beijing	2	0	0	0	0	–
2026 Milano Cortina	2	0	0	0	0	–
2030 French Alps	future event					
2034 Utah	future event					
Total		0	0	0	0	–

=== Medals by summer sport ===
Sport	Gold	Silver	Bronze	Total
Judo	3	1	1	5
Totals (1 entries)	3	1	1	5

== List of medalists ==
Medal	Name	Games	Sport	Event
Gold	Majlinda Kelmendi	2016 Rio de Janeiro	Judo	Women's 52 kg
Gold	Distria Krasniqi	2020 Tokyo	Judo	Women's 48 kg
Gold	Nora Gjakova	2020 Tokyo	Judo	Women's 57 kg
Silver	Distria Krasniqi	2024 Paris	Judo	Women's 52 kg
Bronze	Laura Fazliu	2024 Paris	Judo	Women's 63 kg

== Multiple medalists ==
Athlete	Sport	Games	Gold	Silver	Bronze	Total
Distria Krasniqi	Judo	2020–2024	1	1	0	2

== List of total medal winners from Kosovo in its history ==
No.	Name	Sport	Year
Yugoslav era
1-3	Fahrudin Jusufi; Vladimir Durković; Milutin Šoškić	Football	1960
4	Aziz Salihu	Boxing	1984
Independent Kosovo
5	Majlinda Kelmendi	Judo	2016
6, 8	Distria Krasniqi	Judo	2020, 2024
7	Nora Gjakova	Judo	2020
9	Laura Fazliu	Judo	2024

== Olympic participants ==
=== Summer Olympics ===
Sport	2016	2020	2024	Athletes
Athletics	2	1	1	4
Boxing		1	1	2
Cycling	1			1
Judo	2	5	5	12
Shooting	1	1		2
Swimming	2	2	2	6
Wrestling		1		1

=== Winter Olympics ===
Sport	2018	2022	Athletes
Alpine Skiing	1	2	3

== Flagbearers ==
Summer Olympics
Games	Athlete	Sport
2016 Rio de Janeiro	Majlinda Kelmendi	Judo
2020 Tokyo	Majlinda Kelmendi; Akil Gjakova	Judo
2024 Paris	Nora Gjakova; Akil Gjakova	Judo
2028 Los Angeles
2032 Brisbane

Winter Olympics
Games	Athlete	Sport
2018 Pyeongchang	Albin Tahiri	Alpine skiing
2022 Beijing	Albin Tahiri	Alpine skiing
2026 Milano Cortina	Kiana Kryeziu; Drin Kokaj	Alpine skiing
2030 French Alps	TBC	
2034 Utah	TBC	

== See also ==
- Kosovo at the Paralympics
- Special Olympics Kosovo
- Kosovo at the Youth Olympics
- Kosovo at the World Games
- Kosovo at the European Youth Olympic Festival
- Kosovo at the Mediterranean Games
- Kosovo at the European Games
- Kosovo at the Jeux de la Francophonie
- Kosovo at the Universiade
- Sport in Kosovo
- Sport in Pristina
