= Kosovo at the FISU World University Games =

Kosovo at the Universiade
- IOC code: KOS
- NOC: Kosovo University Sports Federation
- Website: https://fsunk-kos.org
- Medals: Gold 0 Silver 1 Bronze 0 Total 1

Summer appearances
- 1959−2017; 2019

Winter appearances
- 1960−2021

Kosovo became a member of the International University Sports Federation in 2017 and made its debut at the 2019 Summer Universiade.

== Medal count ==
=== Summer Universiade ===
Kosovo first competed in the Summer Universiade in 2019.

Edition				
(Italy) Naples 2019 (details)	0	0	0	0
(China) Chengdu 2023 (details)	–	–	–	–
(Germany) Rhine-Ruhr 2025 (details)	0	1	0	1
(South Korea) Hoseo 2027 (details)				
(United States) Research Triangle 2029 (details)				
Total	0	0	0	0

=== Winter Universiade ===
Following the cancellation of the 2021 edition, Kosovo made its debut at the Winter Universiade in 2025.

Edition				
(Switzerland) Lucerne 2021 (Cancelled)	N/A	N/A	N/A	N/A
(United States) Lake Placid 2023	-	-	-	-
(Italy) Turin 2025	0	0	0	0
Total	0	0	0	0

== List of medalists ==
Summer

Medal	Name(s)	Games	Sport	Event
Silver	Laura Fazliu	(Germany) 2025 Rhine-Ruhr	Judo	Women's half-middleweight (−63 kg)

== See also ==
- Kosovo at the Olympics
- Kosovo at the Youth Olympics
- Kosovo at the European Games
- Kosovo at the Mediterranean Games
- Sport in Kosovo
