= Kosovo at the World Games =

- IOC code: KOS
- NOC: Olympic Committee of Kosovo
- Website: http://www.noc-kosovo.org/
- Medals: Gold 0 Silver 0 Bronze 0 Total 0

World Games appearances (overview)
- 1981; 1985; 1989; 1993; 1997; 2001; 2005; 2009; 2013; 2017; 2022; 2025

Kosovo is made its debut at The World Games in 2025.

== Medal count ==
Games	Athletes	Gold	Silver	Bronze	Total
(China) Chengdu (details)					
(Germany) Karlsruhe (details)	Future event				
Total		0	0	0	0

== See also ==
- Kosovo at the Olympics
- Sport in Kosovo
