= Traditional clothing of Kosovo =

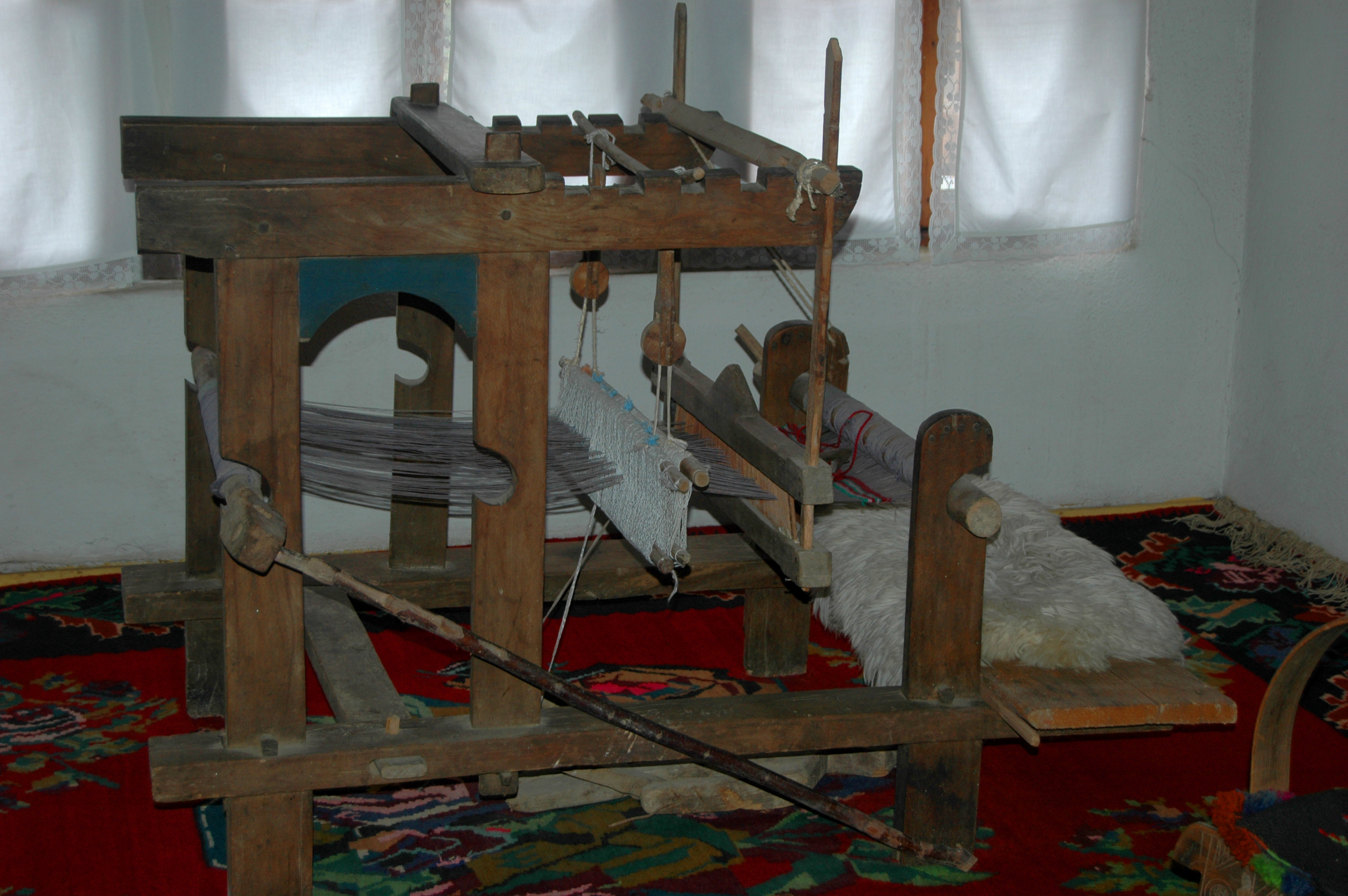
Women's working tool (vek)

Traditional clothing (folk costume) is one of the factors that has differentiated Kosovo from neighboring countries, dating back as far as the Illyrian era.

Kosovar clothing has evolved in service of modernization and contemporary style, however the fundamental symbols and motifs of the garments designs still tend to resemble the Illyrian clothing of antiquity, with the materials and fabrication methods not having changed much. These characteristic Kosovar clothes, are made with a type of loom called a vegjë or vek, which resembles the English spinning jenny and flying shuttle. The motifs and patterns on these garments can be interpreted through prehistoric religion. Triangles, rhombuses, circles, and crosses appear often and symbolize health and fertility. Chromatically, there are three main colors in these clothes, the most symbolic of which is red. Additionally, women would wear gold around their necks and bodies, intending to look elegant and modest.

== Historical origin ==
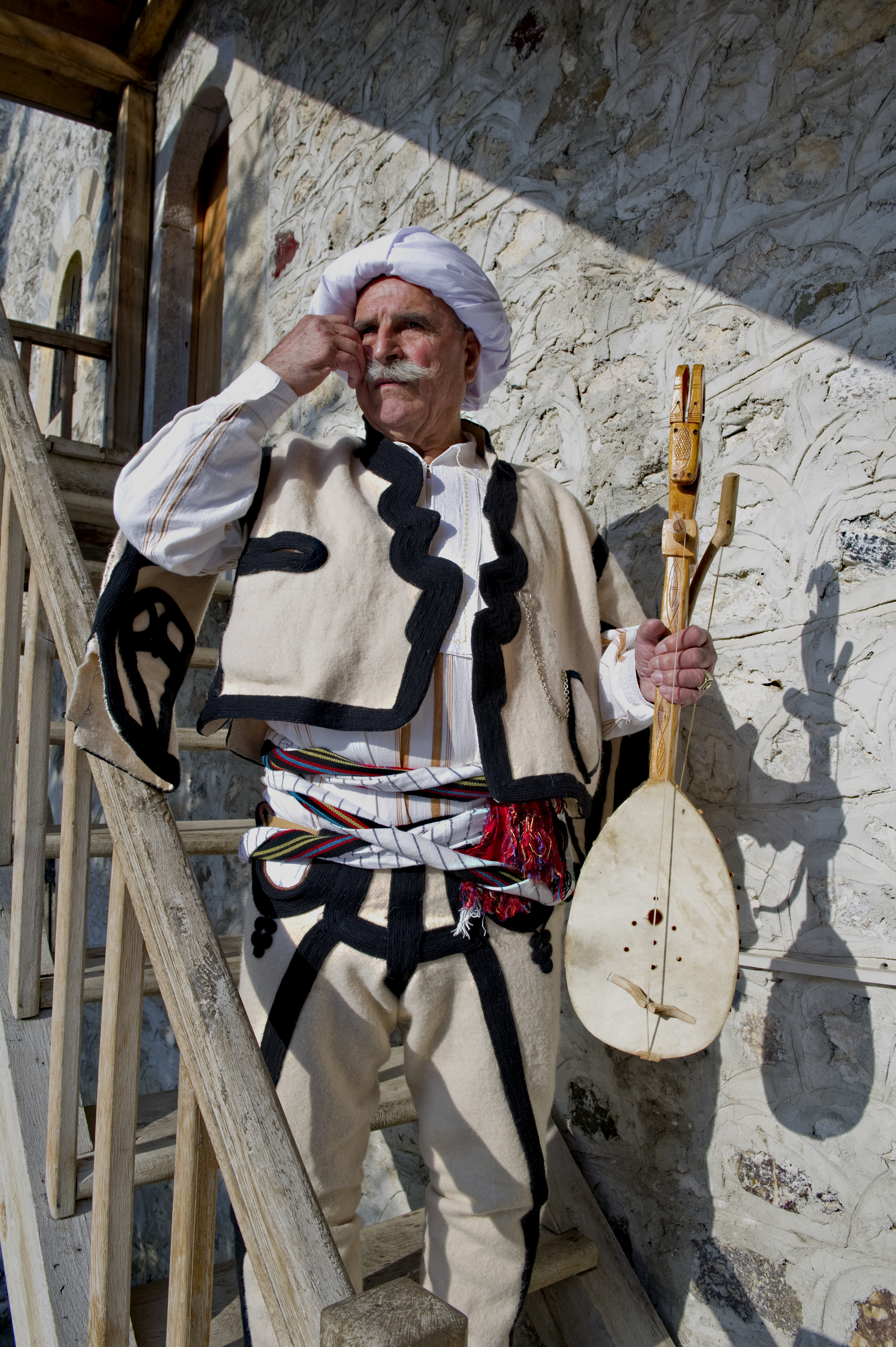
Traditional men's clothing of Podgur, characterized by marhama, as he carries the traditional instrument Lahuta

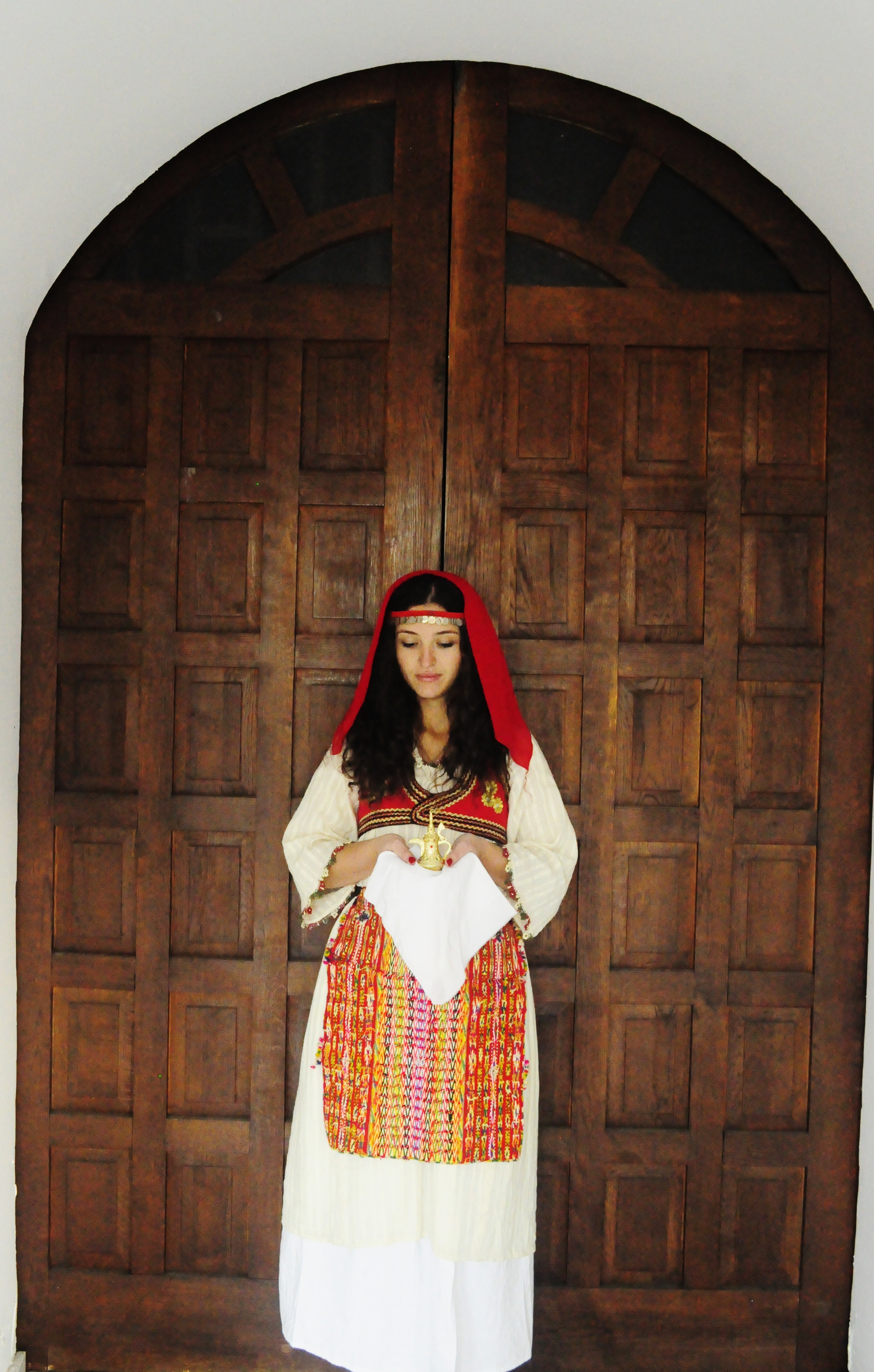
Women's Podgur apparel characterized by the crown lace

Among 140 types of traditional Albanian costumes, the Podgur's attire Veshja e Podgurit is Kosovar, differentiated by its variety and is an influence in all other regions. This costume belonged to the majority of the Illyrian and Albanian regions included in the international framework. The clothing items consist of the shirts of men and women, which are wide sleeved with a narrow collar which was buttoned up and a white traditional hat worn by men called plis, leather moccasins or opinga. According to archaeologists of the Museum of Pristina, Podgur's clothing dates back to the 5th and 4th century BC. However, transformations of this costume happened due to different social and cultural situations, technical inventions and also element exchange between the ethnic groups. From field investigation, it has been reported that in the 19th century and the first two decades of the 20th century, women's clothing went through morphological changes. The 19th-century look consisted of the combing of their hair and braiding them. They also wore red semi-spherical shaped hats which were embellished with tiny gold coins. Around the crown of the hat they wore a tight lace, lidhëse, which was 60 cm long. It was tied so that their hair remained hidden. Marhama is a type of material which was worn along their neck and chin, but the embroidered tail of marhama was laid down along the right shoulder, and it was called masdorja. The shirt was of foot-length and the sleeves were long and wide, approximately 35 cm and also embroidered. Shtjellakët (pështjellakët, mbështjellakët) which were pieces of material that resemble an apron, were big in size and tight in width, and it had geometrical motives, such as an axe or a circle. The moccasins were made from the skin of cattle and knitted with pieces of sheep skin. They were called gogishte moccasins. As belts, they wore woolen material called shokë which were knitted using a loom. It was of 3 cm width, and the embroidered part was tied on the back. Their colors were very characteristic and different, such as red, green, yellow and black. Children of rich families had their clothes knitted by tailors and that made them look like any other grown man. From puberty and on, children's clothing becomes more detailed. In this age boys start to wear plis, where as in cold days they wore scarfs and tirqe, traditional white woolen pants. In the celibacy age boys wore tirqe (which were always white ), plis and vests. However, children clothing in general is characterized by its simplicity. It consists of a knee length shirt which is made of white fabric combined with vertical shokë which was of chestnut color. The wearing of shokë by children was very rare; it was only worn during the years they were celibate and wanted to impress women their social circle. In youngster clothing, the white and black color were worn more often, whereas blazers were also enriched with red, yellow, green, and brown. During cold weather, youngsters also wore a certain type of hat called kapulace. It was made of woolen threads which were skull-shaped and they covered every part of the head and face except the eyes and nose. Blazers were also part of the youngster attire and were made of soutane, resembling the adult costume. Boys wore shoulder-length hair. Before costumes were knitted by tailors, the models were first cut out in Peć. This was done once a year, during fall or winter.

=== Men's clothing ===
Men's clothing was the symbol of beauty at the time. This attire includes a shirt, tëlinat which were long underpants, a scarf and tirqe. There were differences among the clothing of adults, based on their economical standing. In the men clothing framework, the groom's attire was the most symbolic one. The costume is built upon the symbolic meaning of starting a new phase of life. Men of Podgur used to wear white semi-spherical plis. Along with it there was also a scarf made of white fabric which consisted of a few horizontal shokë of different colors. This scarf was circled around plis and covered a part of their head and ears. Scarfs were worn by men of older age, around their forties. Men's shirts were called "chestnut shirts" because they were made of horizontal shokë of chestnut color. "Chestnut shirts" are rarely seen today, except in mountain regions. Blazers were the items worn over shirts. The part among the sleeves, the collar and arms contained a black stripe. The vest or xhamadani made of soutane was wide sleeved and reached the waist in length and had no collar. It was buttoned up with a clasp. The vest was double-breasted, and it was of black color. In cold weather, they used to wear a type of blazer called mitani and was made of soutane material. It was randomly worn over the vest or xhamadani. It had long sleeves, but no collar. The black strap covered the parts along the sleeves, around the neck and along the elbows. Mitani had an opening from the armpits to the elbows, and these openings were used to hold mitani freely. On the left part, a small pocket was sewn where men used to keep their cigars. Mitani was also worn by youngsters, but it was simpler than the mitani of men. Among the traditional clothing of Podgur's men, xhurdia which is a type of clothing worn by young boys is mostly known and symbolizes pride. It was made of soutane and tailors were usually the ones who made it. It had long and tight sleeves, open-chested, waist-length, and had a loose part at the back. Besides xhurdia there is also japanxhija which was a clothing of shepherds. However, it was also worn by others in cases of bad weather or long journeys. During nighttime, it was also used as a type of cover. It was made of white soutane along with black stripes, and it was also sleeveless and foot-length whereas its width depended on the length, taking form into a cone-shaped model. Along the belt the red shokë was worn which was older than the colorful shokë. Its length had to be long enough to be wrapped around the waist 5 times. Tëlinat or the long underpants were made of linen, from which their name originates. Later on these long underpants were also made of fabric using a loom. The edges were embroidered and were 20 cm wide. During summer time men used to wear tëlina along with a shirt which was called the shirt of tire. Shokë was tied around the waist, making the shirt resemble a kilt. Tirqe were made of soutane, which varied in quality based on the amount of cord it contained. Tirqe of high quality contained 20 threads of cord, whereas the one ones with lower quality had two to three threads of cord. The economical status determined which ones they wore. Nevertheless, traditionally white tirqe with black cords were worn in Podgur. Black tirqe were seldom worn by young boys but they were considered infamous because they were worn during the night in order not to attract attention. The socks that they wore were made of sheep wool and were from the toe gore to the heel and sometimes knee -length. Some people used to wear a type of short socks called meste over the previous ones. They were made of the wool and skin of bull, whereas the moccasins were made of sheep skin. After The Second World War, moccasins were made up of threads of different ties and cotton. Instead of opinga they were called yrnek. Men used to wear a lot of accessories at the time, such as rings, qystek të sahatit or otherwise known as pocket watches, etc. Weapons may also be considered as a part of men's accessory, and the revolver was the most common. Simplicity is what characterizes the attire of old men. Their most important item of clothing was Goxhufi, which was type of a vest and it was made of lamb skin. It had a sleeveless design and sometimes was knee length. They were reversible according to the climate.

=== Women's clothing ===
Girls' clothing

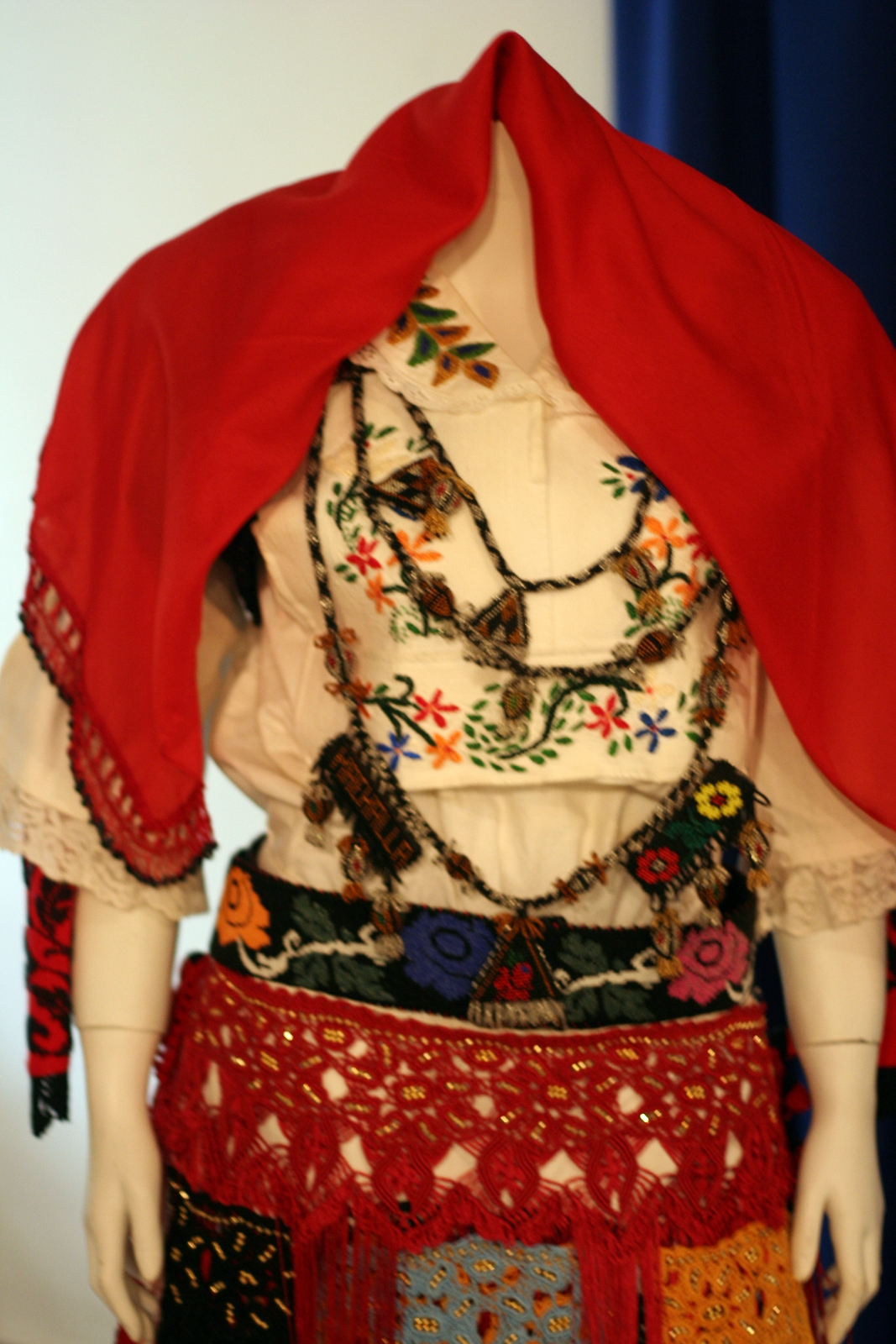
Young women's apparel. The floral embroidery symbolizes vitality and youth.

Even though young girls' costumes are not considered to be very specific or unique, in contrast to the women's attire, these costumes have gone through many transformations during their time being. A part of girls' look was their hairstyle which resembled that of boys. The shirts they wore were the same as those of women, although they were quite more simple. They also used to wear a type of tight skirt called pështjellci which was knee-length and made of woolen threads using a loom. During the last few years, these skirts were also made of linen threads. At the edge of the skirt, different floral designs are embroidered, symbolizing youth and vitality. Their moccasins were identical to those of women. Traditional clothing of young girls has not been completely preserved because of its transition to modernism.

Women's clothing

The transformation of women's attire mainly happened between the years of World War I and World War II. The semi-spherical shaped hats with gold coin embroidery were replaced with laces, called lidhsa. In the region of Istok, these laces were called hotoz. The fabric shirt was also to change its structure during this period of time. Instead of the fabric shirts, këmisha e arrës which is also a part of men's clothing was being used more often. The sleeves were shortened to the elbows and they were also tightened. When the sleeves were shortened, a different type of material was used to cover the part of the palm and up to the elbow. These were made of woolen thread and were known as mëngët or sleeves. Often, they were knitted using different colors.

Mitani also went through changes; it had long sleeves and a tight collar. It was waist-length and it was deep purple. It was usually sold by tailors. The vest, which is considerably new in the traditional clothing of women, was sleeveless. It did not have a collar, and its motifs were solar and lunar. The material which was used to knit these vests was known as coha and was sold by tailors of Peja, Mitrovica and Gjakova. During different journeys, women used to wear jackets called guna and they were made of woolen thread. It was knee-length, wide-sleeved and the parts along the neck were embroidered with threads of black cord. Women also used to wear fur which was seldom that of sheep and known as 'gala'. It was a sleeveless item of clothing. Tëlinat remained mostly the same, except of the kamzave which were pieces of thicker material and covered the knees. They were usually decorated with different kinds of embroidery. Socks were made out of thick woolen sheep thread and were embellished along the pulps. These embellishments differentiated due to age. Traditional clothing of women consisted of a lot of accessories, such as earrings, bracelets and rings.

Elderly women's clothing

The differences between the attire of elderly women and those of younger ones are the same as the differences between elderly and young men. Their main characteristic is the simplicity of their clothing. Except for the differences between group ages, the attire has also changed based on occasions. In weddings and other happy occasions, new clothing was worn, whereas in funerals, a specific costume was worn, known as veshja e Harcit.

== Types of traditional clothing in Kosovo ==
=== Women's clothing ===
Women's clothing is better preserved than the men's in the regions of Kosovo. There are regional variations of the women's apparel.

==== Pështjellak clothing ====
The most famous apparel was called ‘'pështjellak'’ which consistent of a long white shirt, and two ‘'pështjellak'’ (a white apron), the front and the back one. ‘'pështjellaku i parmë'’, or the front apron is as long as the shirt, and it was tailored to fit the woman's hip. ‘'pështjellaku i pasëm'’, the back apron was shorter than the front one. Other components of this clothing were : ‘'tëlina't’ (traditional underwear), ‘'jeleku'’ –resembles a short vest which was embroidered, ‘'shokë’' a large woolen material circling the waist, traditional black socks, and different color head scarves. Accessories were very popular among women – golden and silver necklaces, bracelets and rings. The socks were traditionally black, and they were worn with shoes called ‘'opinga'’, made of different animals’ skin.

==== Xhubleta clothing ====
Another equivalently famous apparel is the Xhubleta-clothing. A xhubleta is a bell wavy skirt which is held by two straps on the shoulders, worn on top of a long sleeved white linen shirt. Its texture consists of long suspended long black straps etched in the material, which was usually chestnut velvet. The socks and shoes were the same as the pështjellak clothing. In the Rugova region (Kosovar West) the xhubleta clothing was worn especially after the Second World War.

==== Dukagjini clothing ====
Veshja e Dukagjinit consisted of a long sleeved, full length white shirt. The tëlina are also of cotton, but their edges are colorfully embroidered. From the waist up, women wore a sleeveless vest decorated by golden threads, which was open to the front and it would button by beautiful clasps. The two pështjellak are also a characteristic of this clothing. The socks were woolen, and the ‘'opinga'’ were made of cattle skin. The decorative motifs of this region’s clothing are zoological, botanical and geometrical. The motif of the snake, rooster, and the Sun is related to the ancient beliefs of the Illyrian pagans. This garment was by default different for brides, who had sleeves embroidered by asymmetrical patterns of non distinctive colors.

==== Has clothing ====
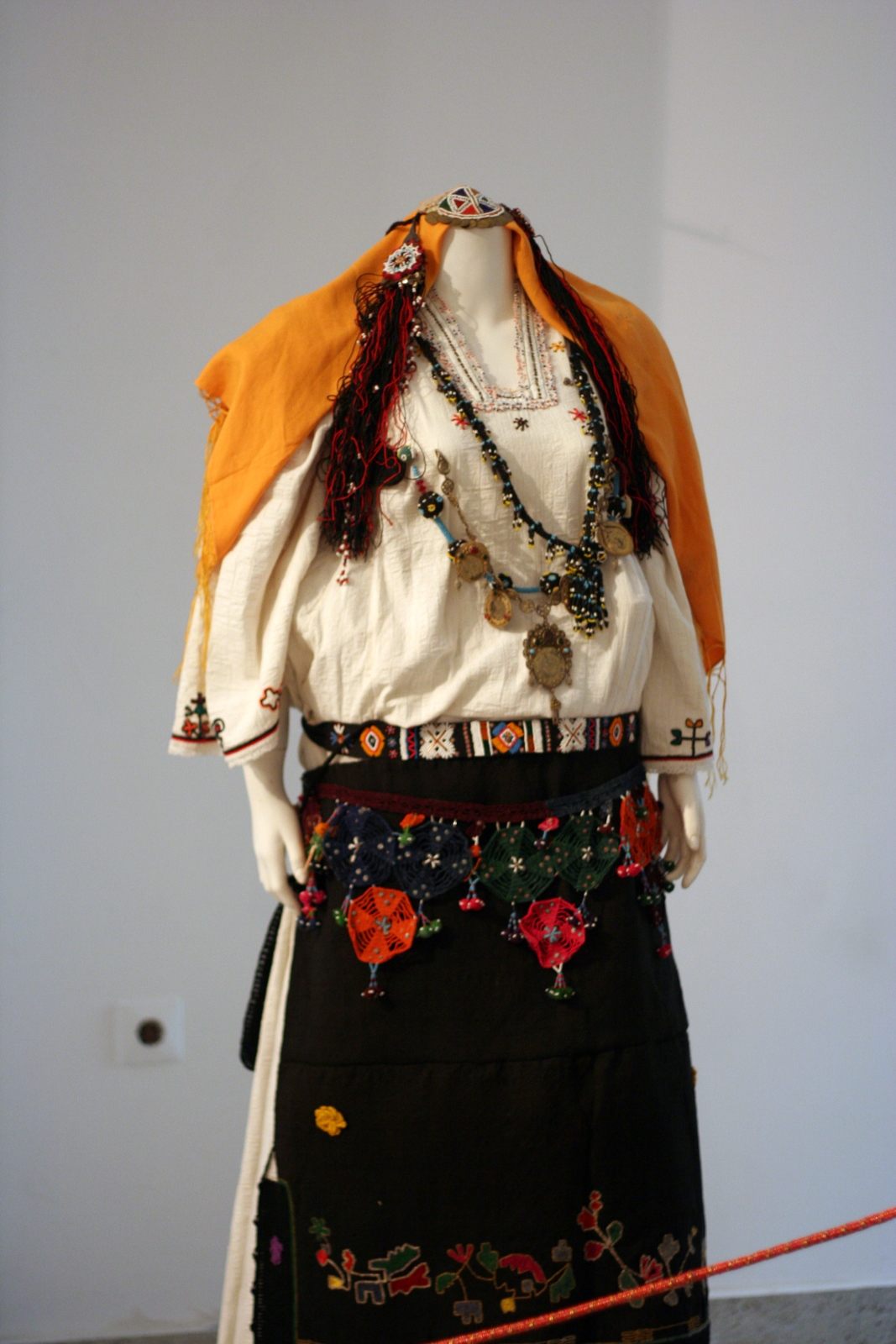
'Has' women apparel

The clothing of the southern region of Has is among the distinctive types of clothing in Kosovo. This garment is commonly found today, as it has survived and embraced the changes of the European styles. A short white shirt and a white linen full –length dress are the main components of the look. Long white drawers served as underpants, the traditional pështjellak was slightly wider than in other regions. The jelek (vest) was enriched with beads, mostly red. It could also contain golden threads. For formal events, they wore a small hat decorated with beads and golden studs. The socks in this costume were white, differently from other costumes’.

=== Men's clothing ===
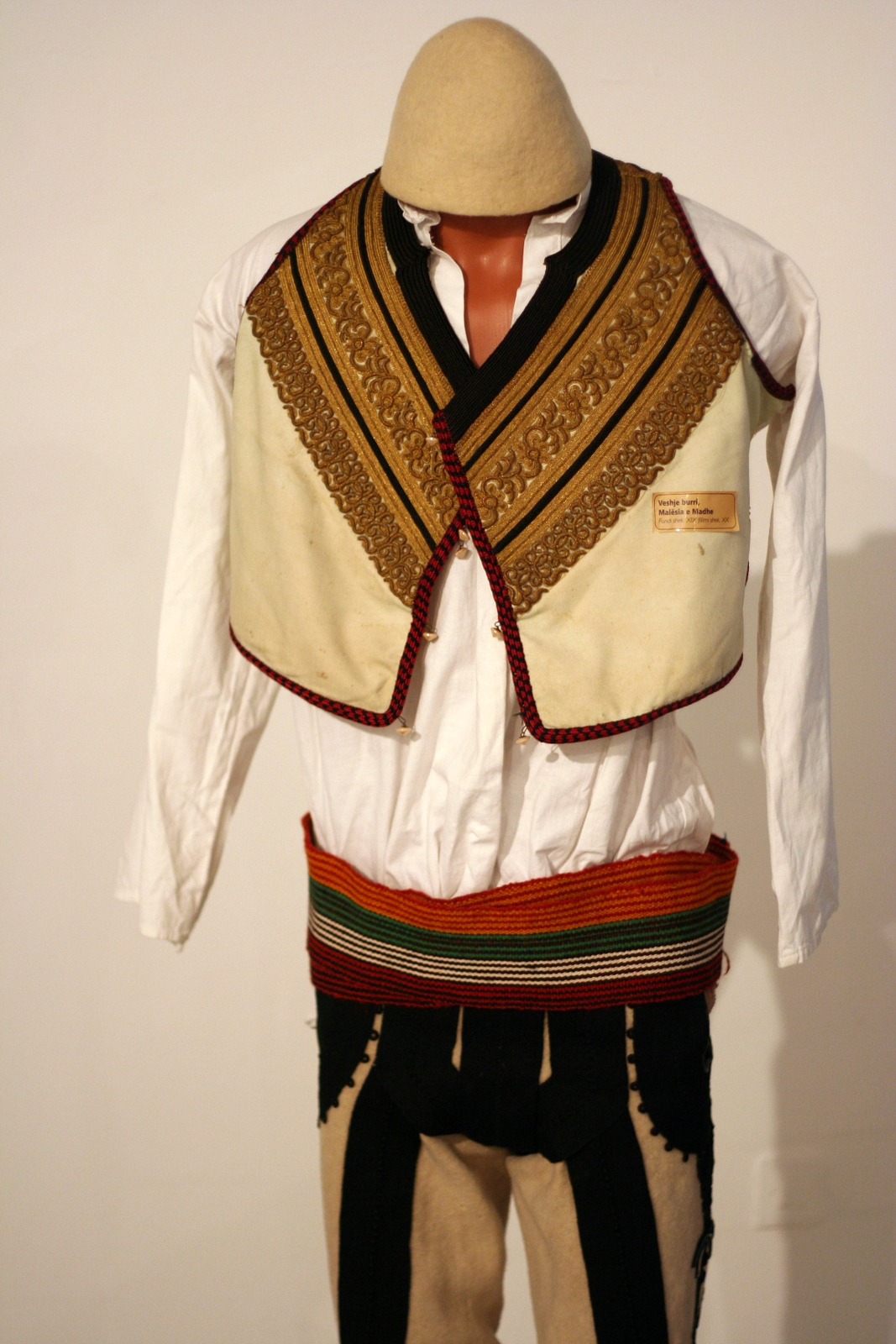
Male tirqi apparel

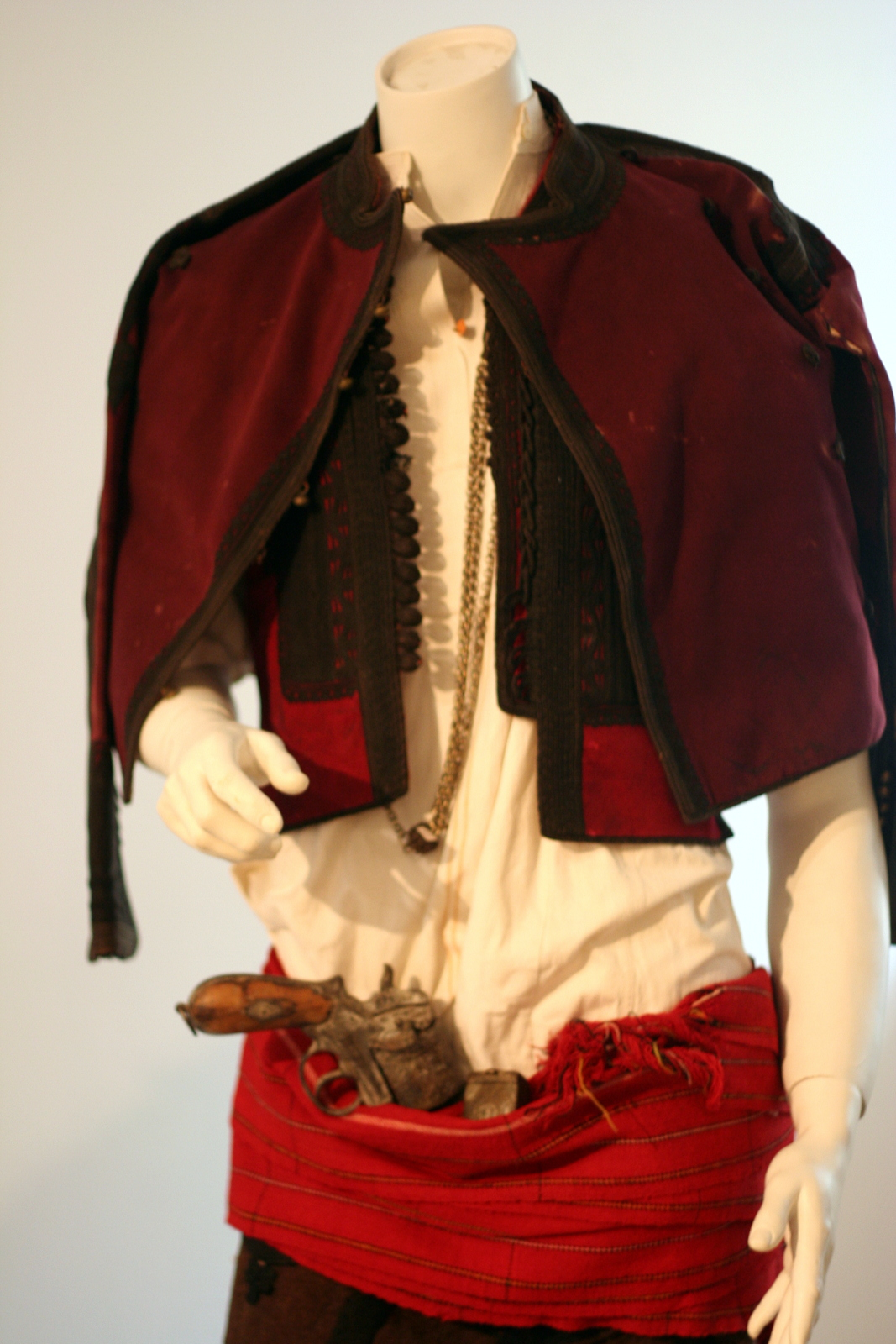
Men's mitan, xhamadan (underneath), shokë and the decorative revolver

Men's clothing was less preserved, however throughout the years it appears as more unified. Men's garments did not change much from region to region. One popular outfit was the one with ‘'fustanelle’' (a version of a kilt) until 1914 the First Balkanic war. The most popular was the tirqi apparel. The full look had elements which are similar to women's (white shirt, tëlina, shokë, socks, opinga, jelek (vest) ), however the tirqi ( woolen white pants) were only a characteristic of men's clothing. The shirt and the ‘tlina’ underpants were exclusively white. The shirts’ collars’ were T-shaped, and the sleeves of their shirts had white simple embroidery. From the waist up, men wore either jelek (vest) or xhamadan, a traditional woolen west which was usually white but was also found in dark colors. Men's accessories were the '‘gajtan'’ – a long black cord, decorated push buttons in their jelek and xhamadanë, and metallic clasps. These vests were designed in such a way that enabled the bearer to move their hands freely, and the sleeves hung loosely back. The tirqi were always decorated around the waist, pockets and vertically in length with black seams. Men wore woolen white socks and cattle skin shoes. In their heads they wore plis, woolen caps, and marhama, a large white scarf which encircles the head and the neck, covering the plis. The marhama or shalli i bardhë originated from Illyrians. Other accessories were qystek, a large golden chain which they put across their shoulders, sahati- a pocketwatch, a cigarette box along with a carved lighter and different silver rings. Occasionally, men held guns in their shokë. The differences these clothes had from region to region were little – they might have been worn more tightly or loosely, the decorations in their tirqi might have been decorated with thicker or thinner seams. There were decorations which implied certain economic status, social status or societal hierarchy. For example, 3 golden threads in tirqi implied celibacy, whereas 12 golden threads implied wedlock. 24 golden threads implied wealth and power, and the most occurring were in older men.

== Traditional clothing based on Regions ==
=== Llap clothing ===
The region of Llap is located in Northeastern Kosovo. Its tradition of clothing has not survived the modernization of clothing and the components of this look have become artifacts. The latest version of this clothing which are remembered consisted of tirqi clothing for men and pështjellak clothing for women. The items of clothing composing this apparel were somewhat similar to other regions’ clothing – tirqi, jelek, shoka, plisi, marhama and common accessories such as qystek- pocket watch, carved metallic cigarette box for men and pështjellak, white shirts, '‘tëlina’', ‘'shoka’', ‘'opinga'’ - moccasins and head scarves for women. Women generally wore more accessories compared to other regions of Kosovo and their shirts had more embroidering with vivid colors. Both men’s and women’s clothing implied the bearer’s socioeconomic standing, based on what quality of material, quantity of embroidery, choice of colors, and ultimately the number of golden threads one had etched on the back of their shirts or ‘'mitan'’. Few remaining prototypes of this apparel are nowadays preserved in the Historical Museum of Pristina.

=== Karadak clothing ===
==== Men's clothing ====
Men's clothing of Karadak consists of the shirt, tëlinat, vest, mitani, xhurdia, fur, socks, moccasins, plis and different accessories such as pocket watches, cigarette boxes and weapons. Shokë of young boys was whiter and it contained a lot of embroidery, whereas shoka of older men was maroon. Shirts of young boys and elderly men differed in width and length. The socks that were worn by the younger ones were decorated with different colors, whereas those of old men were simpler. Tirqi of youngsters and the so-called agzona men ( epithet of courage and pride), were of the color black.

==== Women's clothing ====
Nowadays, in this region Muslims and Christians all wear the so-called Veshje me dimi ( traditional embroidered pants similar to pantaloons ). The clothing that is worn today is similar with the clothing that was worn in the second half of the 19th century which consists of tëlina, dimi, shirt, vest, mitani, pështjellak, socks, moccasins, head-scarf, and accessories such as earrings, bracelets, rings, necklaces and clasps. Veshja me dimi consists of pështjellak, made of fur which is the most important item of the apparel and a shirt which is made out of silk or cotton fabric.
