= Kosovo at the European Youth Olympic Festival =

- IOC code: KOS
- NOC: Olympic Committee of Kosovo
- Website: noc-kosovo.org/
- Medals: Gold 1 Silver 0 Bronze 1 Total 2

After gaining recognition by the International Olympic Committee in December 2014, Kosovo has participated at the European Youth Olympic Festival since the 2015 Summer edition and the 2017 Winter edition.

== Medal tables ==
=== Medals by Summer Youth Olympic Festival ===
| Games | Athletes | Gold | Silver | Bronze | Total | Rank |
|---|---|---|---|---|---|---|
| (Georgia (country)) 2015 Tbilisi | 15 | 0 | 0 | 0 | 0 | - |
| (Hungary) 2017 Győr | 14 | 0 | 0 | 0 | 0 | - |
| (Azerbaijan) 2019 Baku | 18 | 1 | 0 | 0 | 1 | 26 |
| (Slovakia) 2022 Banská Bystrica | 13 | 0 | 0 | 0 | 0 | - |
| (Slovenia) 2023 Maribor | 19 | 0 | 0 | 0 | 0 | - |
| (North Macedonia) 2025 Skopje | 30 | 0 | 0 | 1 | 1 | 39 |
| Total | | 1 | 0 | 1 | 2 | 47 |

=== Medals by Winter Youth Olympic Festival ===
| Games | Athletes | Gold | Silver | Bronze | Total | Rank |
|---|---|---|---|---|---|---|
| (Austria) / 2015 Vorarlberg and Liechtenstein | Did not participate | | | | | |
| (Turkey) 2017 Erzurum | 5 | 0 | 0 | 0 | 0 | - |
| (Bosnia and Herzegovina) 2019 Sarajevo | 2 | 0 | 0 | 0 | 0 | - |
| (Finland) 2022 Vuokatti | | 0 | 0 | 0 | 0 | - |
| (Italy) 2023 Friuli-Venezia Giulia | 3 | 0 | 0 | 0 | 0 | - |
| (Georgia (country)) 2025 Borjomi-Bakuriani | 2 | 0 | 0 | 0 | 0 | - |
| Total | | 0 | 0 | 0 | 0 | - |

=== Medals by sport ===
| Sport | Gold | Silver | Bronze | Total |
|---|---|---|---|---|
| Athletics | 1 | 0 | 0 | 1 |
| Totals (1 entries) | 1 | 0 | 0 | 1 |

== List of medalists ==
| Medal | Name | Games | Sport | Event | Ref |
|---|---|---|---|---|---|
| Gold | Muhamet Ramadani | (Azerbaijan) 2019 Baku | Athletics | Boys’ Shot put | |
| Bronze | Enise Zijade | (North Macedonia) 2025 Skopje | Judo | Girls’ 57kg | |

== See also ==
- Kosovo at the Youth Olympics
- Kosovo at the Olympics
