= Kosovo national minifootball team =

International men's minifootball team

Kosovo
- Nickname(s): Dardanët (Dardanians)
- Association: Kosovo Minifootball Association
- Confederation: EMF (Europe)
- Head coach: Drilon Mehmeti
- Captain: Drilon Mehmeti
- FIFA code: KVX (Note: The international governing body of football, FIFA uses the trigramme 'KVX' for Kosovo, while the European governing body of football, UEFA uses the trigramme 'KOS' for Kosovo.)

First international
- Albania 5–4 (Note: The regular time of the match ended in a goalless draw and after the penalty shoot-out the match was won by Albania.) Kosovo (Tirana, Albania; 27 March 2022)

The Kosovo national minifootball team (Albanian: Kombëtarja e minifutbollit të Kosovës; Serbian: Малог футбалљ репрезентација Косова, romanized: Malog fudbala reprezentacija Kosova) represents Kosovo in international men's minifootball. It is controlled by the Kosovo Minifootball Association, the governing body for minifootball in Kosovo.

== History ==
=== Early beginnings ===
On 25 May 2018, Kosovo Minifootball Association was founded and registered in the competent authorities by Behar Kutllovci, a former footballer and founder of M'M Liga, a Mitrovica-based minifootball league. On 12 July 2019, Kosovo applies for membership in the European Minifootball Federation. On 16 October 2020, Kosovo was accepted into European Minifootball Federation after members voted with twelve votes in favor, three abstentions and one against.

=== First match ===
On 27 March 2022, Kosovo for the first time in its history played its first international friendly match against Albania and the match ended with a 5–4 away defeat after the penalty shoot-out after the regular time of the match ended with a goalless draw, and part of the team were Artan Rrecaj (GK), Astrit Salihu, Blerim Vilanci, Enes Alushaj, Isuf Sejdiu, Krenar Kasumi, Labeat Beshiri, Nuri Damati, Valent Beqiri (GK), Veton Shabani, Visar Zogiani and the team was led by Drilon Mehmeti who was the captain and player-coach.

== Fixtures and results ==
=== 2022 ===
27 March Friendly	Albania	0–0 (a.e.t.) (5–4 p)	Kosovo	Tirana, Albania
14:00		Report		Stadium: Skënder Halili Complex; Referee: Gerald Qirici (Albania)

== Players ==
=== Current squad ===
- The following players were called up for the friendly match against Albania, on 27 March 2022.

No.	Pos.	Nation	Player
1	GK	(Kosovo) KOS	Artan Rrecaj
3	UNK	(Kosovo) KOS	Krenar Kasumi
4	UNK	(Kosovo) KOS	Drilon Mehmeti (captain and player-coach)
5	UNK	(Kosovo) KOS	Visar Zogiani
6	UNK	(Kosovo) KOS	Labeat Beshiri
7	UNK	(Kosovo) KOS	Blerim Vilanci
8	UNK	(Kosovo) KOS	Nuri Damati
9	UNK	(Kosovo) KOS	Veton Shabani
10	UNK	(Kosovo) KOS	Isuf Sejdiu
11	UNK	(Kosovo) KOS	Astrit Salihu
12	GK	(Kosovo) KOS	Valent Beqiri
13	UNK	(Kosovo) KOS	Enes Alushaj

== Competitive record ==
=== WMF World Cup ===
WMF World Cup
Year	Round	Pos	Pld	W	D	L	GF	GA	Squad
(United States) 2015 to (United Arab Emirates) 2023	Team did not exist								
Total	—	0/4	0	0	0	0	0	0	—

=== WMF Continental Cup ===
WMF Continental Cup
Year	Round	Pos	Pld	W	D	L	GF	GA	Squad
(Tunisia) 2019	Team did not exist								
Total	—	0/2	0	0	0	0	0	0	—

=== EMF miniEURO ===
EMF miniEURO
Year	Round	Pos	Pld	W	D	L	GF	GA	Squad
(Slovakia) 2010 to (Ukraine) 2018	Team did not exist								
(Slovakia) 2022	Could not enter								
Total	—	0/10	0	0	0	0	0	0	—
