= 2030 Mediterranean Games =

2030 edition of the Mediterranean Games

XXI Mediterranean Games
- Host city: Pristina
- Country: Kosovo
- Motto: This is how we do it!
- Edition: 21st
- Nations: 26 (expected)
- Athletes: 5,000 (expected)
- Sport: 24 (expected)
- Opening: 21 August
- Closing: 3 September
- Main venue: TBA
- Website: prishtina2030.com

The 2030 Mediterranean Games (Albanian: Lojërat Mesdhetare 2030, Serbian: Медитеранске игре 2030. / Mediteranske igre 2030.), officially known as the XXI Mediterranean Games and commonly known as Prishtina 2030, is a forthcoming international multi-sport event that is scheduled to be held from 24 July to 4 August 2030 in Pristina, Kosovo.

== Bidding process ==
The International Committee of Mediterranean Games (CIJM) launched the bidding process for the 2030 games at a meeting of its executive committee held on 10 December 2022 in Pristina, Kosovo. In April 2023, CIJM announced the end of the candidature process and the sole candidate city, Pristina, for the 2030 Games. Pristina was confirmed as host city on 8 September 2023 during the ICMG General Assembly with 55 votes in favour, eight against and three abstentions.

=== Candidates ===
- Pristina, Kosovo – CIJM president Davide Tizzano stated that "Kosovo, together with the neighbouring countries will be ready to organise the Mediterranean Games" following a meeting with the President of Kosovo, Vjosa Osmani in December 2022. On 4 April 2023, the Prime Minister of Kosovo Albin Kurti, announced that Kosovo has officially applied to host the 2030 Mediterranean Games in Pristina. Kurti also stated that as Kosovo is a small and landlocked country, is expected that some will events to be held in neighbouring Albania. Pristina was officially confirmed as a candidate city by the CIJM on 1 April 2023. The formal host selection took place on 8 September 2023. Prishtina's bid was led by the Secretary General of the Kosovo Olympic Committee, Besim Aliti. This will be the first time that the event is held in a landlocked country and with two host countries.Additionally, it will mark the second instance of the Mediterranean Games being organized in a city without access to the Mediterranean Sea, following the 1983 Mediterranean Games held in Casablanca, Morocco. Additionally, it would be the second time that these games are organized in the former Yugoslavia, following the 1979 Mediterranean Games in Split, Croatia.

=== Vote results ===
2030 Mediterranean Games bidding .
	NOC	Yes	No	Abs
Pristina	Kosovo	55	8	3

== Development and preparation ==
On 20 December 2024 the Prime Minister of Kosovo, Albin Kurti, and the Prime Minister of Albania, Edi Rama, formalised a cooperation agreement for the 2030 Games. This agreement facilitates the inclusion of Durrës, Albania, as a host city for the sailing events.This agreement also opened the possibility to add more venues in Albania if there is any need regarding the issue of other competition venues.

=== Marketing ===
==== Emblem ====
Bid logo

The emblem for the 2030 Mediterranean Games was unveiled during the closing ceremony of the 2026 Mediterranean Games, held in Taranto, Italy. The unveiling officially marked the handover of the Mediterranean Games to Kosovo, which will host the 2030 edition. The vertically turned “2030” represents the Goddess on the Throne, a symbol of Prishtina. The blue “2” and “3” simultaneously form the letters “PR”, the abbreviation of Prishtina. The zeros also evoke the characteristic forms of traditional Albanian carpets, while the typography is inspired by the anatomy of the Latin-Roman alphabet discovered at Ulpiana, an ancient city in Dardania. The logo was created by Dardan Luta, a Kosovo-based artist with many years of professional experience. An earlier logo, used during the bidding process, was designed by Arian Hoti.

==== Promotional video and motto ====
The official promotional video for the games, released in November 2023, showcases the motto "This is how we do it!" and highlights the participation of several distinguished athletes. Notably, the video includes the presence of Olympic medalists Majlinda Kelmendi, Nora Gjakova, and Distria Krasniqi, alongside prominent figures Uta Ibrahimi, Meriton Korenica, Vedat Muriqi, and Donjeta Sadiku.

== Proposed Venues ==
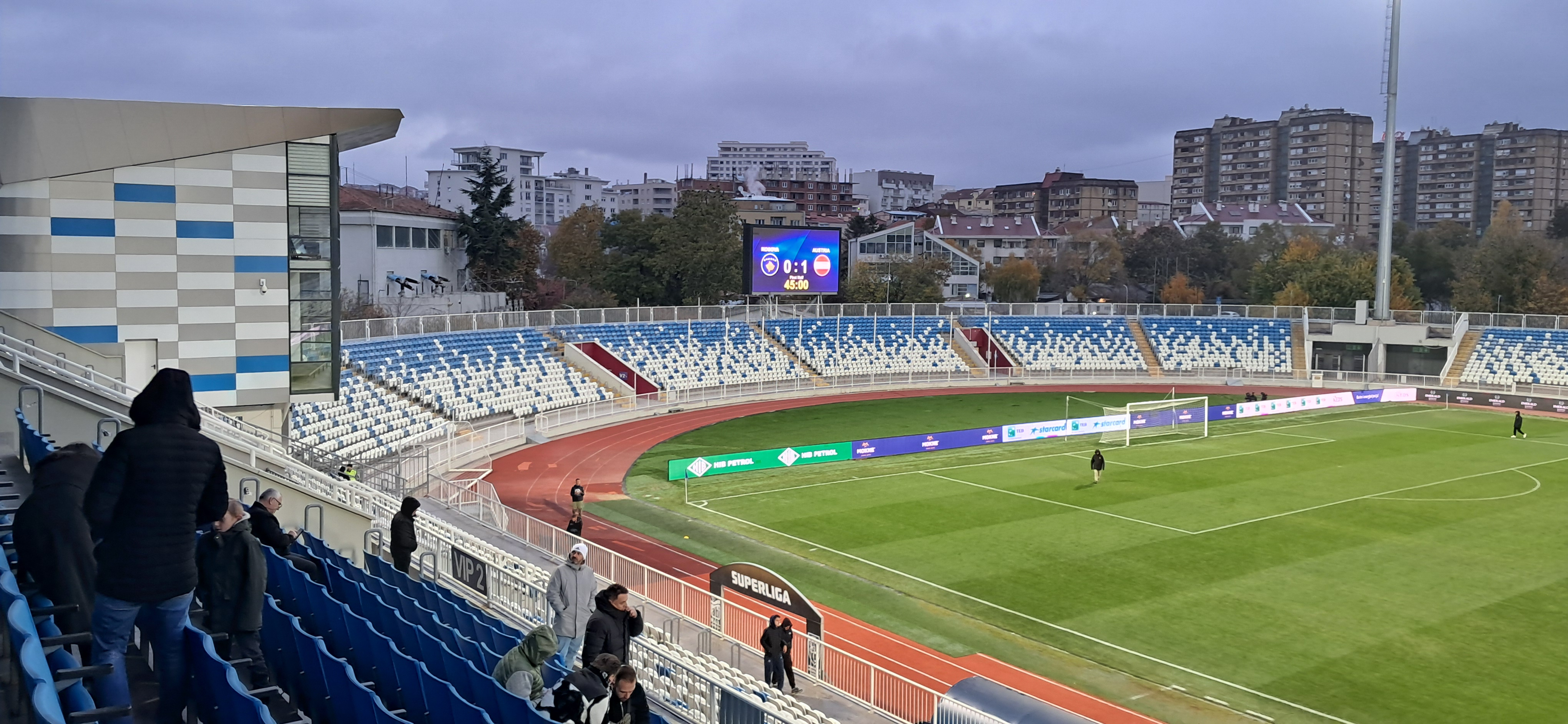
The Fadil Vokrri Stadium in Pristina.

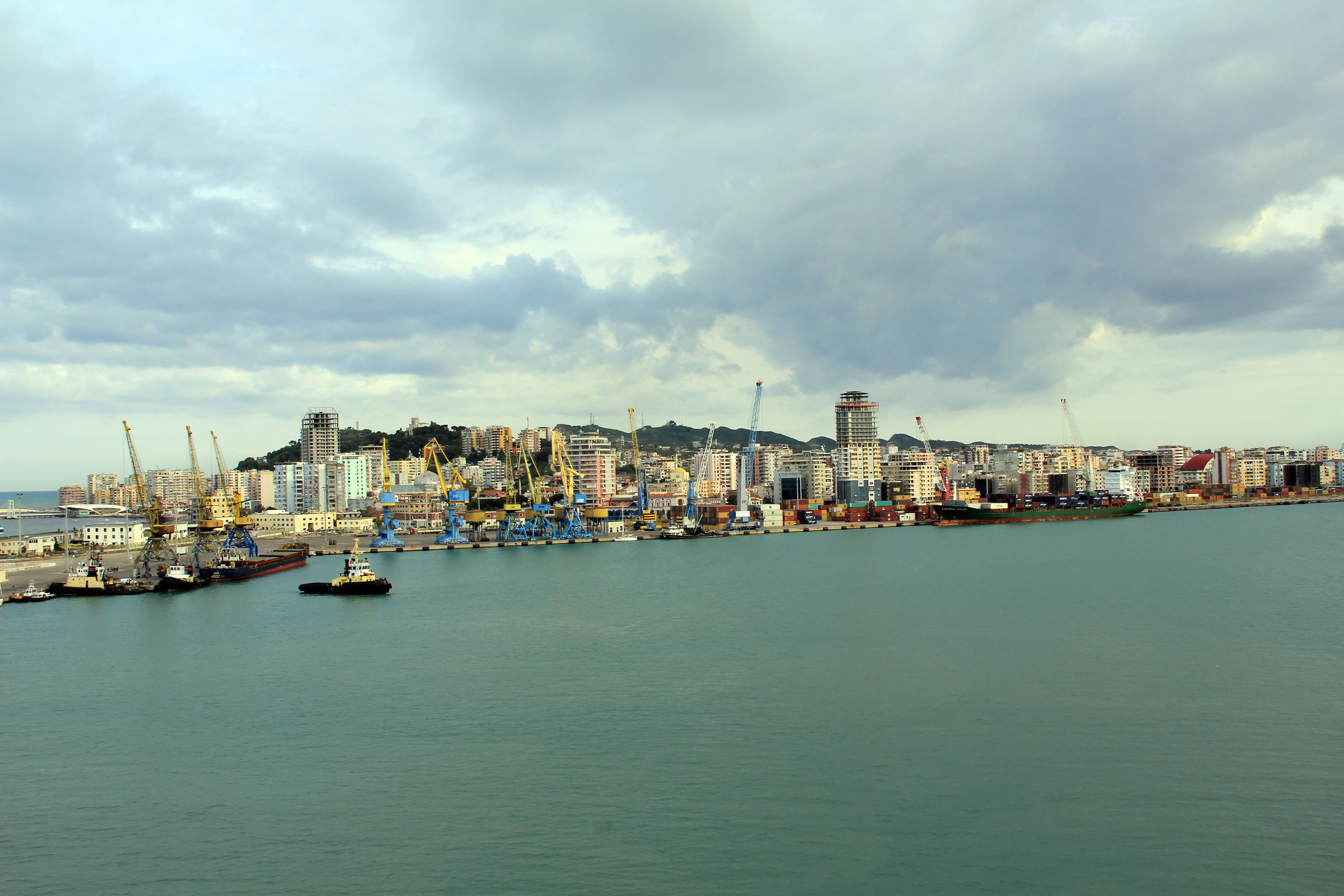
The city of Durrës in Albania on the Adriatic Sea will serve as the host city for the water sports event, as Kosovo is a landlocked country.

Prime Minister Kurti had stated that a newly built national stadium, swimming pool complex, tennis stadium and shooting range will be built for the games. Five temporary venues are to be built and existing facilities such as the Palace of Youth and Sports will be renovated.

In addition to Pristina, events will also take place in cities across Kosovo such as Ferizaj, Gjakova, Mitrovica, Peja, Podujevo and Prizren. As Kosovo is a landlocked country, sailing and other events will take place in Durrës, in neighbouring Albania.

Key to colours
E	Existing
N	New
R	Renovated

List of venues, showing the city, venue, sport and venue capacity
City	Venue	Sport	Capacity	Ref
=== Kosovo ===
Drenas	Drenas New Archery Arena	Archery	TBC	N
Gjakova	Shani Nushi Hall	Fencing Weightlifting	2,000	E
Gjakova	Gjakova City Stadium	Football	10,000	R
Gjilan	Bashkim Selishta Hall	Volleyball	1,700	R
Gjilan	Gjilan City Stadium	Football	9,800	R
Ferizaj	Bill Clinton Hall	Handball	2,000	E
Mitrovica	Minatori Sports Hall	Handball	2,500	E
Mitrovica	Adem Jashari Olympic Stadium	Athletics	18,200	R
Peja	Karagac Sports Hall	Judo	2,000	R
Pristina	Kosovo National Stadium	Opening and closing ceremony	30,000	N
Pristina	Fadil Vokrri Stadium	Football	13,980	E
Pristina	Palace of Youth and Sports	Handball Gymnastics	8,000	R
Pristina	Germia Park	Boules	TBC	E
Pristina	Olympic Swimming Pool Complex	Aquatics	TBC	N
Pristina	Prishtina Boulevards	3x3 basketball	TBC	E
Pristina	Tennis Complex Arena	Tennis	TBC	N
Podujevo	Podujeva Sports Hall	Volleyball	1,500	R
Podujevo	Zahir Pajaziti Stadium	Football	9,000	E
Podujevo	Batlava Lake	Canoeing	TBC	E
Prizren	Sezair Surroi Arena	Wrestling	2,500	E
Skenderaj	Shooting Center	Shooting	TBC	N
=== Albania ===
Durrës	Adriatic Sea	Sailing	1,000 expected	N

== The games ==
=== Sports ===
24 sporting disciplines are expected to take place.

In 2025, the International Committee of the Mediterranean Games decided, following a proposal from the Libyan Olympic Committee, to replace association football with futsal from the 2030 Mediterranean Games, in order to reduce organisational costs.

2030 Mediterranean Games sports programme
- Aquatics
  - Swimming
  - Water polo
  - Finswimming
- Archery
- Athletics
- Badminton
- 3x3 basketball
- Boxing
- Cycling (?)
  - Mountain biking
  - Road cycling
- Fencing
- Futsal
- Gymnastics
  - Artistic gymnastics
  - Rhythmic gymnastics
- Handball
- Judo
- Karate
- Padel
- Rowing
- Sailing
- Shooting
- Sport climbing
- Table tennis
- Taekwondo
- Tennis
- Volleyball
- Weightlifting
- Wrestling

==== Sports that can be added to the program ====
The organizing committee has reserved the right to add two to three additional sports including baseball 5, whitewater canoeing and kayaking, kickboxing and skating.

- Baseball5 ()
- Canoeing ()
- Kickboxing ()
- Kayaking ()
- Skating ()

=== Participating nations ===
Athletes from 26 nations are eligible to participate in the games.

Eligible National Committees
- Albania
- Algeria
- Andorra
- Bosnia and Herzegovina
- Croatia
- Cyprus
- Egypt
- France
- Greece
- Italy
- Kosovo (host)
- Lebanon
- Libya
- Malta
- Monaco
- Montenegro
- Morocco
- North Macedonia
- Portugal
- San Marino
- Serbia
- Slovenia
- Spain
- Syria
- Tunisia
- Turkey

== Calendar ==
The games are to be held between 21 August and 3 September 2030.

== See also ==
- Sport in Kosovo

Preceded by Taranto	Mediterranean Games; Pristina; 2030	Succeeded by TBD
