= Mehmet Bogujevci =

Yugoslav boxer (born 1951)

Personal information
- Nationality: Yugoslav
- Born: 3 May 1951 (age 74)

Sport
- Sport: Boxing

Memet (Mehmet) Bogujevci (born 3 May 1951) is a Yugoslav former boxer. He competed in the men's welterweight event at the 1980 Summer Olympics. At the European Championships in 1977, he won the bronze medal in the light welterweight class.
