= Kosovo at the European Games =

- IOC code: KOS
- Medals Ranked 39th: Gold 1 Silver 1 Bronze 2 Total 4

European Games appearances (overview)
- 2015; 2019; 2023; 2027

Kosovo first participated at the European Games at the inaugural edition in 2015. They have a total of four medals, all in judo: one gold, one silver and two bronzes.

== Medal tables ==
=== Medals by Games ===
Games	Athletes	Gold	Silver	Bronze	Total	Rank
(Azerbaijan) 2015 Baku	19	0	0	1	1	40
(Belarus) 2019 Minsk	12	1	1	1	3	34
(Poland) 2023 Kraków-Małopolska	38	0	0	0	0	-
(Turkey) 2027 Istanbul	Future event					
Total		1	1	2	4	39

=== Medals by sport ===
Sport	Gold	Silver	Bronze	Total
Judo	1	1	2	4
Totals (1 entries)	1	1	2	4

== List of medallists ==
Medal	Name(s)	Games	Sport	Event
Bronze	Nora Gjakova	(Azerbaijan) 2015 Baku	Judo	Women's 57 kg
Gold	Majlinda Kelmendi	(Belarus) 2019 Minsk	Judo	Women's 52 kg
Silver	Nora Gjakova	(Belarus) 2019 Minsk	Judo	Women's 57 kg
Bronze	Loriana Kuka	(Belarus) 2019 Minsk	Judo	Women's 78 kg

== Flagbearers ==
European Games
Games	Athlete	Sport
(Azerbaijan) Baku 2015	Majlinda Kelmendi	Judo
(Belarus) Minsk 2019	Donjeta Sadiku	Boxing
(Poland) Kraków-Małopolska 2023	Donjeta Sadiku; Muhamet Ramadani	Boxing; Athletics
(Turkey) Istanbul 2027		

== See also ==
- Kosovo at the Olympics
- Kosovo at the Mediterranean Games
- Sport in Kosovo
