= Kosovo at the Youth Olympics =

- IOC code: KOS
- NOC: Olympic Committee of Kosovo
- Website: http://www.noc-kosovo.org/
- Medals Ranked 120th: Gold 0 Silver 0 Bronze 1 Total 1

Summer appearances
- 2010-2014; 2018

Winter appearances
- 2012-2016; 2020

Kosovo has participated in the summer edition of the Youth Olympic Games since 2018 and the winter edition since 2020.

== Medal tables ==
=== Medals by Summer Games ===
Games	Athletes	Gold	Silver	Bronze	Total	Rank
(Argentina) Buenos Aires 2018 (Details)	5	0	0	1	1	83
(Senegal) 2026 Dakar	3	0	0	0	0	-
Total		0	0	1	1	109

==== By sport ====
Sport	Gold	Silver	Bronze	Total
Judo	0	0	1	1
Totals (1 entries)	0	0	1	1

=== Medals by Winter Games ===
Games	Athletes	Gold	Silver	Bronze	Total	Rank
(Switzerland) Lausanne 2020 (Details)	2	0	0	0	0	N/A
(South Korea) Gangwon 2024 (Details)	2	0	0	0	0	N/A
(Italy) Dolomiti Valtellina 2028 (Details)	Future Event					
Total		0	0	0	0	N/A

== List of medallists ==
=== Summer ===
Medal	Name(s)	Games	Sport	Event
Bronze	Erza Muminović	(Argentina) 2018 Buenos Aires	Judo	Girl's -44 kg
Bronze	Erza Muminović	(Argentina) 2018 Buenos Aires	Judo	Mixed team

== See also ==
- Kosovo at the Olympics
- Kosovo at the Universiade
- Sport in Kosovo
