= Yugoslavia at the 1979 Mediterranean Games =

- IOC code: YUG
- NOC: Yugoslav Olympic Committee

in Split
- Medals Ranked 1st: Gold 56 Silver 38 Bronze 33 Total 127

Mediterranean Games appearances (overview)
- 1951; 1955; 1959; 1963; 1967; 1971; 1975; 1979; 1983; 1987; 1991

Other related appearances
- Bosnia and Herzegovina (1993–pres.); Croatia (1993–pres.); Slovenia (1993–pres.); Serbia and Montenegro (1997–2005); Montenegro (2009–pres.); Serbia (2009–pres.); North Macedonia (2013–pres.); Kosovo (2018–pres.)

Yugoslavia hosted the 1979 Mediterranean Games in Split and finished first in the medal table with 127 medals.

== Medalists ==
Medal	Name	Sport	Event
Gold	Vladimir Milić	Athletics	Men's Shot put
Gold	Rok Kopitar	Athletics	Men's 400m Hurdles
Gold	Dragan Životić	Athletics	Men's 800m
Gold	Jelica Pavličić	Athletics	Women's 400m
Gold	Nenad Stekić	Athletics	Men's Long jump
Gold	Borisav Pisić	Athletics	Men's 110m Hurdles
Gold	Nađa Avdibašić, Jelica Pavličić, Elizabeta Božinovska, Ana Guštin	Athletics	Women's 4×400m relay
Gold	Branislav Tripković	Gymnastics	Men's Parallel bars
Gold	Miroslav Kezunović	Gymnastics	Men's Horizontal bar
Gold	Jasna Dokl	Gymnastics	Women's Balance beam
Gold	Radomir Kovačević	Judo	+95 kg
Gold	Vojo Vujević	Judo	71 kg
Gold	Slavko Obadov	Judo	86kg
Gold	Milorad Stanulov	Rowing	Single sculls
Gold	Duško Mrduljaš, Zlatko Celent, Josip Reić	Rowing	Coxed pairs
Gold	Fazlija Šaćirović	Boxing	Bantamweight
Gold	Milivoje Labudović	Boxing	Lightweight
Gold	Ace Rusevski	Boxing	Light Welterweight
Gold	Mehmet Bogujevci	Boxing	Welterweight
Gold	Miodrag Perunović	Boxing	Light Middleweight
Gold	Tadija Kačar	Boxing	Middleweight
Gold	Slobodan Kačar	Boxing	Light Heavyweight
Gold	Dragan Vujković	Boxing	Heavyweight
Gold	Matija Ljubek	Canoeing	Men's C-1 500m
Gold	Matija Ljubek	Canoeing	Men's C-1 1000m
Gold	Mirko Nišović, Matija Ljubek	Canoeing	Men's C-2 500m
Gold	Football team: Aleksandar Stojanović Zoran Vujović Nikica Cukrov Boro Primorac Vedran Rožić Nenad Starovlah Blaž Slišković Mišo Krstičević Ismet Hadžić Rajko Janjanin Miloš Šestić Zlatko Vujović Predrag Pašić Srećko Bogdan Tomislav Ivković Miloš Hrstić Dragan Okuka	Football	Men's tournament
Gold	Vladimir Zrnić	Weightlifting	82,5kg
Gold	Handball team: Adnan Dizdar Momir Rnić Pero Janjić Drago Jovović Radisav Pavićević Željko Zovko Zdravko Rađenović Radivoj Krivokapić Velibor Nenadić Željko Vidaković Rusmir Delahmetović Zoran Jovanović	Handball	Men's tournament
Gold	Handball team: Vesna Radović Vesna Milošević Ana Titlić Milenka Sladić Zorica Pavićević Nadežda Stanojević Svetlana Kitić Biserka Višnjić Katica Ileš Todorović Zorica Vojnović Mirjana Ognjenović Zdenka Leutar Dragica Mijač	Handball	Women's tournament
Gold	Field hockey team: Dušan Jovetić Ivica Pravica Tomislav Marcikić Grgo Šmit Stipan Prčić Anton Jurgec Mladen Radić Ivica Prahin Josip Ivković Imre Farkaš Vladimir Škrlec Željko Ivić	Field hockey	Men's tournament
Gold	Koce Efremov	Wrestling	Freestyle 52kg
Gold	Risto Darlev	Wrestling	Freestyle 57kg
Gold	Shaban Sejdiu	Wrestling	Freestyle 68kg
Gold	Kiro Ristov	Wrestling	Freestyle 74kg
Gold	Ivan Frgić	Wrestling	Greco-Roman 62kg
Gold	Ferenc Čaba	Wrestling	Greco-Roman 68kg
Gold	Karolj Kasap	Wrestling	Greco-Roman 74kg
Gold	Momir Petković	Wrestling	Greco-Roman 82kg
Gold	Darko Nišavić	Wrestling	Greco-Roman 90kg
Gold	Refik Memišević	Wrestling	Greco-Roman 100kg
Gold	Prvoslav Ilić	Wrestling	Greco-Roman +100kg
Gold	Borut Petrič	Swimming	Men's 400m Freestyle
Gold	Borut Petrič	Swimming	Men's 1500m Freestyle
Gold	Borut Petrič	Swimming	Men's 400m Medley
Gold	Water polo team: Milorad Krivokapić Zoran Gopčević Damir Polić Ratko Rudić Zoran Musutr Zoran Roje Milivoj Bebić Slobodan Trifunović Boško Lozica Predrag Manojlović Luko Vezilić	Water polo	Men's tournament
Gold	Srećko Pejović	Shooting	Men's 50 metre rifle three positions
Gold	Zdravko Milutinović	Shooting	Men's 50 metre rifle prone
Gold	Valerija Sabatka	Shooting	Women's 50 metre rifle three positions
Gold	Mima Jaušovec	Tennis	Women's singles
Gold	Mima Jaušovec, Renata Šašak	Tennis	Women's doubles
Gold	Dragutin Šurbek	Table tennis	Men's singles
Gold	Dragutin Šurbek, Anton Stipančić, Zoran Kosanović, Zoran Kalinić, Kovač	Table tennis	Men's teams
Gold	Eržebet Palatinuš	Table tennis	Women's singles
Gold	Eržebet Palatinuš, Gordana Perkućin	Table tennis	Women's doubles
Gold	Volleyball team: Vladimir Bogoevski Boro Jović Rade Malević Slobodan Lozančić Aleksandar Tacevski Miodrag Mitić Vladimir Trifunović Ljubomir Travica Zdravko Kuljić Goran Nešić Vinko Dobrić Goran Srbinovski	Volleyball	Men's tournament
Silver	Dragan Zdravković	Athletics	Men's 1500m
Silver	Željko Knapić, Dragan Životić, Rok Kopitar, Josip Alebić	Athletics	Men's 4×400m relay
Silver	Miloš Srejović	Athletics	Men's Triple jump
Silver	Darko Cujnik	Athletics	Men's Decathlon
Silver	Ana Guštin	Athletics	Women's 400m
Silver	Snežana Dančetović	Athletics	Women's Long jump
Silver	Breda Lorenci	Athletics	Women's Pentathlon
Silver	Milan Janić	Canoeing	Men's K-1 500m
Silver	Milan Janić	Canoeing	Men's K-1 1000m
Silver	Milan Janić, Dušan Filipović	Canoeing	Men's K-2 1000m
Silver	Klara Konc, Milena Popov	Canoeing	Women's K-2 500m
Silver	Klara Konc, Milena Popov, Slavica Nadrljanski, Milka Nadrljanski	Canoeing	Women's K-4 500m
Silver	Selena Trajković	Diving	Platform
Silver	Branislav Tripković	Gymnastics	Men's Pommel horse
Silver	Alenka Zupančič	Gymnastics	Women's Vault
Silver	Alenka Zupančič	Gymnastics	Women's Uneven bars
Silver	Jasna Dokl	Gymnastics	Women's Floor exercise
Silver	Ranko Miranović	Judo	95kg
Silver	Franc Očko	Judo	60kg
Silver	Zoltan Ilin	Tennis	Men's singles
Silver	Zoltan Ilin, Zoran Petković	Tennis	Men's doubles
Silver	Dušan Jurše, Darko Zibar	Rowing	Double sculls
Silver	Milan Arežina, Zoran Pančić, Dragan Obradović, Nikola Stefanović	Rowing	Quadruple sculls
Silver	Janez Grbelja, Stevo Macura, Zdravko Gracin, Ivo Despot, Ante Ban	Rowing	Coxed fours
Silver	Basketball team: Sabit Hadžić Stevan Gešoski Boban Petrović Miodrag Marić Andro Knego Ivica Dukan Mihovil Nakić Ratko Radovanović Željko Poljak Damir Pavličević Mirza Delibašić Rajko Žižić	Basketball	Men's tournament
Silver	Marko Ostrogonac	Weightlifting	56kg
Silver	Dušan Mirković	Weightlifting	75kg
Silver	Branko Tomljanović	Weightlifting	100kg
Silver	Slavko Skušek	Wrestling	Greco-Roman 52kg
Silver	Borut Petrič	Swimming	Men's 200m Freestyle
Silver	Borut Petrič	Swimming	Men's 200m Butterfly
Silver	Biserka Golob	Shooting	Women's 50 metre rifle three positions
Silver	Mirjana Jovović	Shooting	Women's 50 metre rifle prone
Silver	Dragutin Šurbek, Anton Stipančić	Table tennis	Men's doubles
Silver	Dubravka Fabri	Table tennis	Women's singles
Silver	Eržebet Palatinuš, Anton Stipančić	Table tennis	Mixed doubles
Silver	Eržebet Palatinuš, Gordana Perkućin, Dubravka Fabri, Branka Batinić	Table tennis	Women's teams
Silver	Volleyball team: Nada Gašević Snježana Azenić Jadranka Roknić Vesna Komnenić Cvijeta Stakić Ljiljana Stojmirović Stojna Gavrilović Majda Novak Jelena Reljin Radmila Ostojić Verica Kramarić Nada Zrilić	Volleyball	Women's tournament
Bronze	Josip Alebić	Athletics	Men's 400m
Bronze	Janez Sagadin; Dragan Zarić; Aleksandar Popović; Borisav Pisić	Athletics	Men's 4×100m relay
Bronze	Danial Temim	Athletics	Men's High jump
Bronze	Miljenko Rak	Athletics	Men's Long jump
Bronze	Milan Spasojević	Athletics	Men's Triple jump
Bronze	Ivan Ivančić	Athletics	Men's Shot put
Bronze	Neđo Đurović	Athletics	Men's Javelin throw
Bronze	Srećko Štiglić	Athletics	Men's Hammer throw
Bronze	Joško Vlašić	Athletics	Men's Decathlon
Bronze	Nađa Avdibašić	Athletics	Women's 800m
Bronze	Lidija Benedetić	Athletics	Women's High jump
Bronze	Kosa Stojković	Athletics	Women's Discus throw
Bronze	Borbala Menjhart	Athletics	Women's Javelin throw
Bronze	Drago Frelih; Bojan Udovič; Bruno Bulić; Janez Novak	Cycling	Team time trial
Bronze	Selver Mustafi	Boxing	Light Flyweight
Bronze	Bratislav Ristić	Boxing	Featherweight
Bronze	Miroslav Kezunović, Dušan Aćimović, Branislav Tripković, Jovičić, Kumčić	Gymnastics	Men's team
Bronze	Minski Fabris	Sailing	Finn
Bronze	Vesna Šeparović	Swimming	Women's 400m Medley
Bronze	Mirko Dimčevski	Wrestling	Freestyle 48kg
Bronze	Šaip Bajrami	Wrestling	Freestyle 62kg
Bronze	Anton Stipančić	Table tennis	Men's singles
Bronze	Zoran Kalinić, Zoran Kosanović	Table tennis	Men's doubles
Bronze	Branka Batinić	Table tennis	Women's singles
Bronze	Branka Batinić, Dubravka Fabri	Table tennis	Women's doubles
Bronze	Gordana Perkučin, Zoran Kalinić	Table tennis	Mixed doubles
Bronze	Zdravko Milutinović	Shooting	Men's 50 metre rifle three positions
Bronze	Franc Peternel Jr	Shooting	Men's Rapid fire pistol
Bronze	Davor Vukorepa	Judo	65kg
Bronze	Goran Žuvela	Judo	Openweight
Bronze	Boris Pejović, Mirko Ivančić	Rowing	Coxless pairs
Bronze	Darko Mikšić, Zdravko Huljev, Milan Radetić, Dragan Vujović	Rowing	Coxless fours
Bronze	Božidar Đorđević, Dušan Kovačević, Miodrag Janković, Srđan Radovanović, Dragoslav Jovanović, Vladimir Krstić, Milorad Kenić, Jovan Tešmanović, Saša Mimić	Rowing	Eights

== Medals by sport ==
Sport	Gold	Silver	Bronze	Total
Wrestling	11	1	2	14
Boxing	8	0	2	10
Athletics	7	7	13	27
Table tennis	4	4	5	13
Canoeing	3	5	0	8
Gymnastics	3	4	1	8
Judo	3	2	2	7
Shooting	3	2	2	7
Swimming	3	2	1	6
Rowing	2	3	3	8
Tennis	2	2	0	4
Handball	2	0	0	2
Weightlifting	1	3	0	4
Volleyball	1	1	0	2
Field hockey	1	0	0	1
Football	1	0	0	1
Water polo	1	0	0	1
Basketball	0	1	0	1
Diving	0	1	0	1
Cycling	0	0	1	1
Sailing	0	0	1	1
Totals (21 entries)	56	38	33	127
