= Yugoslavia at the 1975 Mediterranean Games =

- IOC code: YUG
- NOC: Yugoslav Olympic Committee

in Algiers
- Medals Ranked 3rd: Gold 24 Silver 17 Bronze 23 Total 64

Mediterranean Games appearances (overview)
- 1951; 1955; 1959; 1963; 1967; 1971; 1975; 1979; 1983; 1987; 1991

Other related appearances
- Bosnia and Herzegovina (1993–pres.); Croatia (1993–pres.); Slovenia (1993–pres.); Serbia and Montenegro (1997–2005); Montenegro (2009–pres.); Serbia (2009–pres.); North Macedonia (2013–pres.); Kosovo (2018–pres.)

Yugoslavia competed at the 1975 Mediterranean Games held in Algiers, Algeria.

== Medalists ==
Medal	Name	Sport	Event
Gold	Josip Alebić	Athletics	Men's 400m
Gold	Milovan Savić	Athletics	Men's 800m
Gold	Boško Božinović	Athletics	Men's 1500m
Gold	Borisav Pisić	Athletics	Men's 110m hurdles
Gold	Nenad Stekić	Athletics	Men's Long jump
Gold	Ivica Ivičak; Milorad Čikić; Milovan Savić; Josip Alebić	Athletics	Men's 4 × 400 m relay
Gold	Ivan Ivančić	Athletics	Men's Shot put
Gold	Žarko Primorac	Athletics	Men's Javelin throw
Gold	Srećko Štiglić	Athletics	Men's Hammer throw
Gold	Jelica Pavličić	Athletics	Women's 400m
Gold	Basketball team: Dražen Dalipagić Mirza Delibašić Blagoja Georgievski Željko Jerkov Dragan Kićanović Andro Knego Ratko Radovanović Goran Rakočević Žarko Varajić Radivoj Živković Rajko Žižić	Basketball	Men's tournament
Gold	Adem Ašanović	Boxing	Bantamweight
Gold	Milenko Rubelj	Boxing	Light Welterweight
Gold	Handball team: Abaz Arslanagić Milorad Karalić Zdravko Miljak Željko Nimš Radisav Pavičević Nebojša Popović Branislav Pokrajac Miroslav Pribanić Zdravko Rađenović Zvonimir Serdarušić Predrag Timko Zdenko Zorko	Handball	Men's tournament
Gold	Slavko Obadov	Judo	80kg
Gold	Pavle Bajčetić	Judo	93kg
Gold	Ivan Frgić	Wrestling	Greco-Roman, 57 kg
Gold	Sreten Damjanović	Wrestling	Greco-Roman, 68 kg
Gold	Momir Petković	Wrestling	Greco-Roman, 82 kg
Gold	Shaban Sejdiu	Wrestling	Freestyle, 62 kg
Gold	Zdravko Milutinović	Shooting	50 meter rifle three positions
Gold	Srećko Pejović	Shooting	50 metre rifle prone
Gold	Volleyball team: Vladimir Bogojevski Aleksandar Boričić Vladimir Bošnjak Vinko Dobrić Mirsad Elezović Miloš Grbić Miodrag Gvozdenović Ivica Jelić Siniša Kisić Laslo Lukač Živojin Vračarić Stevo Vujasinović	Volleyball	Men's tournament
Gold	Volleyball team: Gordana Grčić Ana Jokanović Nevena Jovanović Vesna Mrdić Dušica Miletić Majda Novak Vlasta Pesaresi Marijeta Pučko Cvijeta Stakić Vesna Tuličić Nada Zrilić Mirjana Živaljević	Volleyball	Women's tournament
Silver	Jelica Pavličić	Athletics	Women's 100m
Silver	Vinko Galušić	Athletics	Men's 20km walk
Silver	Snežana Hrepevnik	Athletics	Women's high jump
Silver	Milan Spasojević	Athletics	Men's triple jump
Silver	Predrag Križan	Athletics	Men's 200m
Silver	Branislava Gak, Lidija Vidmar, Đurđa Fočić, Jelica Pavličić	Athletics	Women's 4 × 100 m relay
Silver	Mihridžan Turčinović	Boxing	Lightweight
Silver	Živorad Jelisijević	Boxing	Welterweight
Silver	Kiro Ristov	Wrestling	Freestyle - 74kg
Silver	Darko Nišavić	Wrestling	Greco-Roman - 90kg
Silver	Karolj Danji	Wrestling	Greco-Roman - +100kg
Silver	Sandro Rudan	Swimming	Men's 200m Freestyle
Silver	Predrag Miloš	Swimming	Men's 100m Backstroke
Silver	Predrag Miloš	Swimming	Men's 200m Backstroke
Silver	Water polo team: Zoran Kačić Ozren Bonačić Uroš Marović Ratko Rudić Đuro Savinović Damir Polić Milan Franjković Dejan Dabović Boško Lozica Predrag Manojlović Predrag Vraneš	Water polo	Men's tournament
Silver	Dragan Savić	Tennis	Singles
Silver	Srećko Pejović	Shooting	50 meter rifle three positions
Bronze	Milorad Čikić	Athletics	Men's 400m
Bronze	Đurđa Fočić	Athletics	Women's High jump
Bronze	Đurđa Fočić	Athletics	Women's 100m hurdles
Bronze	Svetomir Belić	Boxing	Light Middleweight
Bronze	Maja Dokl, Maja Selinger, Andrea Dimnik, Gordana Ilić, Đaković, Antonia Nikolovska	Gymnastics	Women's team
Bronze	Maja Dokl	Gymnastics	Women's Vault
Bronze	Dušan Mirković	Weightlifting	75kg snatch
Bronze	Dušan Mirković	Weightlifting	75kg biathlon
Bronze	Vladimir Zrnić	Weightlifting	75kg clean & jerk
Bronze	Jože Urankar	Weightlifting	82,5kg clean & jerk
Bronze	Jože Urankar	Weightlifting	82,5kg biathlon
Bronze	Ivan Vidmajer	Judo	63kg
Bronze	Milan Mijalković	Judo	70kg
Bronze	Momir Lučić	Judo	+93kg
Bronze	Risto Darlev	Wrestling	Freestyle - 57kg
Bronze	Ace Jordanov	Wrestling	Freestyle - 68kg
Bronze	Vojislav Tabački	Wrestling	Greco-Roman - 68kg
Bronze	Nenad Miloš	Swimming	Men's 100m Backstroke
Bronze	Božidar Linhart, Sandro Rudan, Predrag Miloš, Rene Lustig	Swimming	Men's 4 × 100 m Freestyle
Bronze	Višnja Petković	Swimming	Women's 100m Breaststroke
Bronze	Dragan Savić, Zoltan Ilin	Tennis	Doubles
Bronze	Franc Peternel	Shooting	Rapid fire pistol
Bronze	Tomislav Ilić	Shooting	50 metre pistol

== Medals by sport ==
Sport	Gold	Silver	Bronze	Total
Athletics	10	6	3	19
Wrestling	4	3	3	10
Boxing	2	2	1	5
Shooting	2	1	2	5
Judo	2	0	3	5
Volleyball	2	0	0	2
Basketball	1	0	0	1
Handball	1	0	0	1
Swimming	0	3	3	6
Tennis	0	1	1	2
Water polo	0	1	0	1
Weightlifting	0	0	5	5
Gymnastics	0	0	2	2
Totals (13 entries)	24	17	23	64
