= Yugoslavia at the 1983 Mediterranean Games =

- IOC code: YUG
- NOC: Yugoslav Olympic Committee

in Casablanca
- Medals Ranked 4th: Gold 16 Silver 18 Bronze 19 Total 53

Mediterranean Games appearances (overview)
- 1951; 1955; 1959; 1963; 1967; 1971; 1975; 1979; 1983; 1987; 1991

Other related appearances
- Bosnia and Herzegovina (1993–); Croatia (1993–); Slovenia (1993–); Serbia and Montenegro (1997–2005); Montenegro (2009–); Serbia (2009–); North Macedonia (2013–); Kosovo (2018–)

Yugoslavia competed at the 1983 Mediterranean Games held in Casablanca, Morocco.

== Medalists ==
Medal	Name	Sport	Event
Gold	Snežana Dančetović	Athletics	Women's Long jump
Gold	Jovan Lazarević	Athletics	Men's Shot put
Gold	Joško Vlašić	Athletics	Men's Decathlon
Gold	Basketball team: Borislav Vučević Nebojša Zorkić Mihovil Nakić Jovanović Ivan Sunara Karadžić Vukičević Emir Mutapčić Stevica Čeko Šantelj Vujačić Zufer Avdija	Basketball	Men's tournament
Gold	Bojan Ropret	Cycling	Road race
Gold	Handball team: Zlatan Arnautović Momir Rnić Veselin Vuković Stjepan Obran Jovica Elezović Zdravko Zovko Željko Vidaković Pavle Jurina Veselin Vujović Mile Isaković Dragan Mladenović Mirko Bašić	Handball	Men's tournament
Gold	Borut Petrič	Swimming	200m Freestyle
Gold	Darjan Petrič	Swimming	400m Freestyle
Gold	Renata Šašak	Tennis	Women's singles
Gold	Water polo team: Marjan Risek Sergio Afrić Antonio Milat Dragan Andrić Veselin Đuho Zoran Roje Milivoj Bebić Goran Sukno Željko Kaurloto Zoran Petrović Andrija Popović Filipović Tomislav Paškvalin	Water polo	Men's tournament
Gold	Šaban Trstena	Wrestling	Men's Freestyle 57kg
Gold	Karolj Kasap	Wrestling	Greco-Roman 74kg
Gold	Karolj Kopas	Wrestling	Greco-Roman 82kg
Gold	Čaba Majoroš	Wrestling	Greco-Roman 90kg
Gold	Jožef Tertei	Wrestling	Greco-Roman 100kg
Gold	Refik Memišević	Wrestling	Greco-Roman +100kg
Silver	Slobodanka Čolović	Athletics	Women's 800m
Silver	Marica Mršić	Athletics	Women's 1500m
Silver	Marica Mršić	Athletics	Women's 3000m
Silver	Biljana Petrović	Athletics	Women's High jump
Silver	Lidija Lapajne	Athletics	Women's High jump
Silver	Ljubiša Simić	Boxing	Flyweight
Silver	Dragan Konovalov	Boxing	Featherweight
Silver	Mirko Puzović	Boxing	Light Welterweight
Silver	Bojan Ropret, Bruno Bulić, Marko Cuderman, Janez Lampič	Cycling	Team time trial
Silver	Branislav Tripković	Gymnastics	Men's Parallel bars
Silver	Stanko Anderle	Judo	Openweight
Silver	Darjan Petrič	Swimming	Men's 1500m Freestyle
Silver	Luka Radman	Weightlifting	90kg
Silver	Laslo Zerge	Wrestling	Greco-Roman 52kg
Silver	Zoran Šorov	Wrestling	Men's Freestyle 52kg
Silver	Prvoslav Ilić	Wrestling	Men's Freestyle +100kg
Silver	Abaz Emini	Wrestling	Men's freestyle 48kg
Silver	Adman Elezi	Wrestling	Men's Freestyle 82kg
Bronze	Željko Knapić	Athletics	Men's 400m
Bronze	Vladimir Milić	Athletics	Men's Shot put
Bronze	Mirela Šket	Athletics	Women's 800m
Bronze	Mojca Šavle	Athletics	Women's 400m hurdles
Bronze	Katica Mataković, Slobodanka Čolović, Mirela Šket, Elizabeta Božinovska	Athletics	Women's 4×400m relay
Bronze	Vukašin Dobrašinović	Boxing	Bantamweight
Bronze	Sreten Mirković	Boxing	Welterweight
Bronze	Nusret Redžepi	Boxing	Middleweight
Bronze	Xhevdet Peci	Boxing	Heavyweight
Bronze	Franc Očko	Judo	65kg
Bronze	Vojo Vujević	Judo	71kg
Bronze	Filip Leščak	Judo	78kg
Bronze	Stanko Lopatić	Judo	86kg
Bronze	Todor Barišić	Judo	+95kg
Bronze	Darjan Petrič	Swimming	Men's 200m Freestyle
Bronze	Borut Petrič	Swimming	Men's 400m Freestyle
Bronze	Borut Petrič	Swimming	Men's 200m Medley
Bronze	Nađa Pentić, Vesna Šeparović, Edita Grubišić, Bojana Kavčić	Swimming	Women's 4×100m Freestyle Relay
Bronze	Volleyball team: Cvijeta Stakić Radmila Ostojić Mirjana Grčić Snežana Azenić Jovanka Marković Mileva Borinčević Ljiljana Pešić Biljana Vladisavljević Božana Pavić Aleksandra Bezjak Barbara Kislinger Jasmina Redžović	Volleyball	Women's tournament

== Medals by sport ==
Sport	Gold	Silver	Bronze	Total
Wrestling	6	5	0	11
Athletics	3	5	5	13
Swimming	2	1	4	7
Cycling	1	1	0	2
Basketball	1	0	0	1
Handball	1	0	0	1
Tennis	1	0	0	1
Water polo	1	0	0	1
Boxing	0	3	4	7
Judo	0	1	5	6
Gymnastics	0	1	0	1
Weightlifting	0	1	0	1
Volleyball	0	0	1	1
Totals (13 entries)	16	18	19	53
