= Yugoslavia at the 1991 Mediterranean Games =

- IOC code: YUG
- NOC: Yugoslav Olympic Committee

in Athens
- Medals Ranked 5th: Gold 16 Silver 13 Bronze 9 Total 38

Mediterranean Games appearances (overview)
- 1951; 1955; 1959; 1963; 1967; 1971; 1975; 1979; 1983; 1987; 1991

Other related appearances
- Bosnia and Herzegovina (1993–pres.); Croatia (1993–pres.); Slovenia (1993–pres.); Serbia and Montenegro (1997–2005); Montenegro (2009–pres.); Serbia (2009–pres.); North Macedonia (2013–pres.); Kosovo (2018–pres.)

Yugoslavia competed at the 1991 Mediterranean Games held in Athens, Greece. This was the country's last appearance before the breakup of Yugoslavia.

== Medalists ==
Medal	Name	Sport	Event
Gold	Saša Karan	Athletics	Men's Decathlon
Gold	Tamara Malešev	Athletics	Women's Long jump
Gold	Ljubiša Simić	Boxing	Featherweight
Gold	Željko Mavrović	Boxing	Heavyweight
Gold	Handball team: Valter Matošević Dejan Perić Mehmedalija Mulabdić Zoran Tomić Nenad Peruničić Nedeljko Jovanović Rastko Stefanović Igor Butulija Dragan Škrbić Vladica Spasojević Aleksandar Knežević Vladimir Novaković Senjanin Maglajlija	Handball	Men's tournament
Gold	Handball team: Dragica Đurić Katica Ileš Stanica Gole Ljiljana Marković Stana Vuković Renata Pavličić Tatjana Polajner Dragana Pešić Ljiljana Knežević Snežana Pavlović Zagorka Baštovanović Klaudija Klikovac Milena Jelača Željka Rajak Branka Jovanović	Handball	Women's tournament
Gold	Nemanja Mirosavljev	Shooting	Men's 50 metre rifle prone
Gold	Jasna Šekarić	Shooting	Women's 25 metre pistol
Gold	Jasna Šekarić	Shooting	Women's 10 metre air pistol
Gold	Suzana Skoko	Shooting	Women's 10 metre air rifle
Gold	Hrvoje Barić	Swimming	Men's 100m Butterfly
Gold	Jasna Fazlić	Table tennis	Women's singles
Gold	Ilija Lupulesku, Zoran Primorac	Table tennis	Men's doubles
Gold	Gordana Perkučin, Jasna Fazlić	Table tennis	Women's doubles
Gold	Šaban Trstena	Wrestling	Freestyle 62kg
Gold	Goran Kasum	Wrestling	Greco-Roman 82kg
Silver	Dejan Joković; Nenad Đurović; Ismail Mačev; Slobodan Branković	Athletics	Men's 4×400m relay
Silver	Ilir Mustafa	Boxing	Light Middleweight
Silver	Dragomir Poleksić	Boxing	Middleweight
Silver	Miroslav Jočič	Judo	71kg
Silver	Mladen Makjanić	Sailing	Laser
Silver	Stevan Pletikosić	Shooting	Men's 50 metre rifle prone
Silver	Goran Maksimović	Shooting	Men's 10 meter air rifle
Silver	Volleyball team: Dejan Brđović Mirko Čulić Vladimir Grbić Ekrem Lagumdžija Žarko Petrović Željko Tanasković Goran Vujević Ljubiša Ristić Slobodan Kovač Vladimir Mladenović	Volleyball	Men's tournament
Silver	Water polo team: Aleksandar Šoštar Dušan Popović Vaso Subotić Dubravko Šimenc Igor Milanović Viktor Jelenić Mirko Vičević Vitomir Padovan Mislav Bezmalinović Perica Bukić Anto Vasović Goran Rađenović Renco Posinković	Water polo	Men's tournament
Silver	Nandor Sabo	Wrestling	Greco-Roman 68kg
Silver	Pajo Ivošević	Wrestling	Greco-Roman 90kg
Silver	Željko Trajković	Wrestling	Greco-Roman 74kg
Silver	Zoran Šorov	Wrestling	Freestyle 57kg
Bronze	Vlado Poslek	Canoeing	K-1 1000m
Bronze	Mitar Milinković	Judo	+95kg
Bronze	Darja Alauf	Swimming	Women's 100m Backstroke
Bronze	Darja Alauf	Swimming	Women's 200m Backstroke
Bronze	Zoran Primorac	Table tennis	Men's singles
Bronze	Gordana Perkučin	Table tennis	Women's singles
Bronze	Sandra Sušilo	Table tennis	Women's singles
Bronze	Franjo Horvat	Wrestling	Greco-Roman 130kg
Bronze	Vojislav Matić	Wrestling	Greco-Roman 62kg

== Medals by sport ==
Sport	Gold	Silver	Bronze	Total
Shooting	4	2	0	6
Table tennis	3	0	3	6
Wrestling	2	4	2	8
Boxing	2	2	0	4
Athletics	2	1	0	3
Handball	2	0	0	2
Swimming	1	0	2	3
Judo	0	1	1	2
Sailing	0	1	0	1
Volleyball	0	1	0	1
Water polo	0	1	0	1
Canoeing	0	0	1	1
Totals (12 entries)	16	13	9	38
