= Rowing at the 1979 Mediterranean Games =

Rowing competition

- Location: Zaton, Yugoslavia

The Rowing Competition at the 1979 Mediterranean Games was held in Zaton near Šibenik.

== Medalists ==
Event	Gold	Silver	Bronze
Single sculls	Milorad Stanulov (YUG)	Didier Gallet (FRA)	Constantin Kontomanolis (GRE)
Double sculls	France (FRA); Marc Bordoux; Denis Gaté	Yugoslavia (YUG); Dušan Jurše; Darko Zibar	Italy (ITA); Fabrizio Biondi; Annibale Venier
Quadruple sculls	France (FRA); Roland Weill; Charles Imbert; Jean Raymond Peltier; Christian Marquis	Yugoslavia (YUG); Milan Arežina; Zoran Pančić; Dragan Obradović; Nikola Stefanović	Spain (ESP); Angel Saez; Angel Viana; José Montosa; Fernando Climent
Coxless pairs	Italy (ITA); Antonio Baldacci; Franco Valtorta	France (FRA); Dominique Lecointe; Jean-Claude Roussel	Yugoslavia (YUG); Boris Pejović; Mirko Ivančić
Coxed pairs	Yugoslavia (YUG); Duško Mrduljaš; Zlatko Celent; Josip Reić (c)	Italy (ITA); Giuseppe Abbagnale; Antonio Dell'Aquila; Giuseppe Di Capua (c)	France (FRA); Yves Fraisse; Pascal Garcia; Gilles Grullie (c)
Coxless fours	France (FRA); Jean-Pierre Bremer; Jean-Claude Roussel; Dominique Lecointe; Nicolas Lourdaux	Italy (ITA); Alberto Santilli; Andrea Rocchegiani; Paolo Zago; Cristian Padula	Yugoslavia (YUG); Darko Mikšić; Zdravko Huljev; Milan Radetić; Dragan Vujović
Coxed fours	France (FRA); Gilbert Franz; Frédéric Perkowski; Jean Michel Izart; Didier Nouzies; Gilles Grullier (c)	Yugoslavia (YUG); Janez Grbelja; Stevo Macura; Zdravko Gracin; Ivo Despot; Ante Ban (c)	Italy (ITA); Marco Palma; Enzo Borgonovi; Antonio Di Criscienzo; Ariosto Temporin; Siro Meli (c)
Eights	Spain (ESP); Jaime Masovila; Luis Arteaga Leon; José Manuel Bermúdez; Miguel Solano; José Pardas; Isidro Martín; Salvador Verges; Luis María Lasúrtegui; Pedro Olasagasti Arruti (c)	France (FRA); Dominique Basset; Bernard Bruand; Bernard Chevalier; Serge Fornara; Jacques Taborski; Eric Baudino; André Perrot; Dominique Toubart; Jean-Pierre Huguet-Balent (c)	Yugoslavia (YUG); Božidar Đorđević; Dušan Kovačević; Miodrag Janković; Srđan Radovanović; Dragoslav Jovanović; Vladimir Krstić; Milorad Kenić; Jovan Tešmanović; Saša Mimić (c)

== Medal table ==
Rank	Nation	Gold	Silver	Bronze	Total
1	France (FRA)	4	3	1	8
2	Yugoslavia (YUG)	2	3	3	8
3	Italy (ITA)	1	2	2	5
4	Spain (ESP)	1	0	1	2
5	Greece (GRE)	0	0	1	1
Totals (5 entries)		8	8	8	24
