= Golf at the Mediterranean Games =

Golf is one of the sports at the quadrennial Mediterranean Games competition. It has been a sport in the program of the Mediterranean Games since 1991.

== Medalists ==
=== Men ===
Games	Year	Men	
Games	Year	Individual	Team
XIII	1991	(gold) (Italy) Manny Zerman, 289; (silver) (Spain) Tomás Jesus Muñoz, 296; (silver) (Greece) Georgios Nikitaldes, 296	(gold) Italy (Marcello Santi, Massimo Florioli, Manny Zerman), 585; (silver) France (Mikael Garabedian, Christophe Muniesa, Christian Cévaër), 589; (bronze) Spain (Diego Borrego, Tomás Jesus Muñoz, Alvaro Prat), 592
XII	1993	(gold) (France) Christian Cévaër, 285; (silver) (Spain) Francisco Valera, 286; (bronze) (Greece) Brenden Pappas, 289	(gold) France (Christian Cévaër, Jean-Yann Dusson, Benjamin Nicolay), 575; (silver) Spain (José Manuel Lara, Alvaro Prat, Francisco Valera), 577; (bronze) Greece (Brenden Pappas, Georgios Nikitaidis, Pelops Panagopoulos), 587
XIII	1997	(gold) (France) Olivier David, 272; (silver) (France) Grégory Havret, 282; (bronze) (Italy) Alessandro Napoleoni, 283	(gold) France (Grégory Havret, Olivier David, Christophe Ravetto), 550; (silver) Italy (Luca Fracassi, Alessandro Napoleoni, Carlo Zaretti), 575; (bronze) Spain (Mario Bedia, Gerard Pera, Antonio Pons), 591
XIV	2001	(gold) (France) Philippe Lima, 283; (silver) (Lebanon) Ali Hammoud, 296; (bronze) (Spain) Carlos de Corral, 300	(gold) France (Grégory Bourdy, Bruno Lecuona, Philippe Lima), 583; (silver) Spain (Rafa Cabrera-Bello, Carlos de Corral, Alfredo Garcia-Heredia), 603; (bronze) Lebanon (Mazen Hamdan, Ali Hammoud, Cheikh Mouss El-Zein), 608
XV	2005	(gold) (Spain) Ignacio Sanchez-Palencia, 290; (silver) (France) Julien Grillon, 293; (bronze) (Turkey) Hamza Hakan Sayın, 294	(gold) Spain, 582; (silver) Turkey, 583; (bronze) France, 594
XVI	2009	(gold) (Slovenia) Tim Gornik; (silver) (Italy) Filippo Bergamaschi; (bronze) (France) Nicolas Peyrichou	(gold) Italy (Filippo Bergamaschi, Niccolo Ravano, Claudio Vigano); (silver) France (Fréderic Abadie, Mayel Oueld Es Cheikh, Nicolas Peyrichou); (bronze) Turkey (Mustafa Hocaoğlu, Gencer Özcan, Hamza Hakan Sayın)
XVII	2013	did not appear	
XVIII	2018	(gold) (Spain) Mario Galiano Aguilar; (silver) (Italy) Aron Zemmer; (bronze) (Slovenia) Žan Luka Štirn	(gold) Spain (Mario Galiano Aguilar, Iván Cantero, Álvaro Velasco); (silver) Italy (Aron Zemmer, Jacopo Vecchi Fossa, Philip Geerts); (bronze) France (Nicolas Platret (a), Paul Foulquié (a), Marin D'Harcourt (a))
XIX	2022	did not appear	

=== Women ===
Games	Year	Women	
Games	Year	Individual	Team
XIII	1991	(gold) (Italy) Caterina Quintarelli, 306; (silver) (France) Caroline Bourtayre, 307; (bronze) (Spain) Esther Valera, 309	(gold) France (Valérie Michaud, Anne Lanzerac, Caroline Boutayre), 607; (silver) Italy (Isabella Maconi, Caterina Quintarelli, Isabella Calagero), 617; (bronze) Spain (Amaya Arruti, Macarena Campomanes, Esther Valera), 618
XII	1993	(gold) (Spain) Estefania Knuth, 286; (silver) (France) Stephanie Dallongeville, 298; (bronze) (Spain) Marina Arruti, 300	(gold) Spain (Marina Arruti, Estefania Knuth, Laura Navarro), 582; (silver) France (Stephanie Dallongeville, Patricia Meunier, Kristel Mourgue d’Algue), 600; (bronze) Italy (Giuliana Colavito, Caterina Quintarelli, Alessandra Salvi), 607
XIII	1997	(gold) (Italy) Maria Paola Casati, 282; (silver) (France) Maïtena Alsuguren, 288; (bronze) (Italy) Silvia Cavalleri, 293	(gold) Italy (Maria Paola Casati, Silvia Cavalleri, Giulia Sergas), 572; (silver) France (Maïtena Alsuguren, Ludivine Kreutz, Gwladys Nocera), 577; (bronze) Spain (Sara Beautell, Marta Prieto Olivares, Ana Belén Sánchez), 590
XIV	2001	(gold) (France) Sophie Giquel, 299; (silver) (Spain) Marta Prieto, 300; (bronze) (Spain) Tania Elósegui, 300	(gold) Spain (Carmen Alonso, Tania Elósegui, Marta Prieto), 597; (silver) France (Maïtena Alsuguren, Sophie Giquel, Alexandra Vilatte), 602; (bronze) Italy (Tullia Calzavara, Diana Luna, Barbara Paruscio), 613
XV	2005	(gold) (Spain) María Hernández, 298; (silver) (France) Elena Giraud, 300; (bronze) (France) Anne-Lise Caudal, 300	(gold) Spain, 596; (silver) France, 599; (bronze) Italy, 617
XVI	2009	(gold) (Spain) Azahara Muñoz; (silver) (Spain) Carlota Ciganda; (bronze) (France) Emilie Alonso	(gold) Spain (Carlota Ciganda, Ines Diaz Negrete Palacio, Azahara Muñoz); (silver) France (Emilie Alonso, Rosanna Crépiat, Perrine Delacour); (bronze) Italy (Alessandra Averna, Alessandra De Poli De Luigi, Giulia Molinaro)
XVII	2013	did not appear	
XVIII	2018	(gold) (Spain) Marta Sanz; (silver) (Italy) Angelica Moresco; (bronze) (Slovenia) Ana Belac	(gold) Spain (Marta Sanz, Natalia Escuriola, Patricia Sanz); (silver) Italy (Roberta Liti (a), Diana Luna, Angelica Moresco (a)); (bronze) Slovenia (Pia Babnik (a), Vida Obersnel (a), Ana Belac (a))
XIX	2022	did not appear	

== All-time medal table ==
Updated after the 2018 Mediterranean Games

Rank	Nation	Gold	Silver	Bronze	Total
1	Spain (ESP)	18	7	8	33
2	France (FRA)	6	13	5	24
3	Italy (ITA)	3	7	6	16
4	Slovenia (SLO)	1	0	3	4
5	Greece (GRE)	0	1	2	3
6	Lebanon (LIB)	0	1	1	2
7	Turkey (TUR)	0	0	2	2
Totals (7 entries)		28	29	27	84
