= Cycling at the Mediterranean Games =

Cycling is one of the sports at the quadrennial Mediterranean Games competition. It has been a sport in the program of the Mediterranean Games since its inception in 1955.

== Editions ==
| Games | Year | Host | Winner of the medal table | Second in the medal table | Third in the medal table |
|---|---|---|---|---|---|
| II | 1955 | (Spain) Barcelona | Italy | France | Spain |
| III | 1959 | (Lebanon) Beirut | Italy | Spain | France |
| IV | 1963 | (Italy) Naples | Italy | France | Spain |
| V | 1967 | (Tunisia) Tunis | Italy | Spain | Tunisia |
| VI | 1971 | (Turkey) İzmir | Italy | Spain | Yugoslavia |
| VII | 1975 | (Algeria) Algiers | Italy | Spain | France |
| VIII | 1979 | (Socialist Federal Republic of Yugoslavia) Split | France | Italy | Spain |
| IX | 1983 | (Morocco) Casablanca | Italy | Yugoslavia | France |
| X | 1987 | (Syria) Latakia | Italy | Spain | France |
| XI | 1991 | (Greece) Athens | Italy | Spain | France |
| XII | 1993 | (France) Languedoc-Roussillon | Italy | Spain; France | |
| XIII | 1997 | (Italy) Bari | Italy | France | Slovenia |
| XIV | 2001 | (Tunisia) Tunis | Italy | Spain | |
| XV | 2005 | (Spain) Almería | France | Spain | Italy |
| XVI | 2009 | (Italy) Pescara | Italy | France | Slovenia |
| XVII | 2013 | (Turkey) Mersin | France | Italy | Spain |
| XVIII | 2018 | (Spain) Tarragona | Italy | Portugal | Spain |
| XIX | 2022 | (Algeria) Oran | Italy | France | Portugal |
| XX | 2026 | (Italy) Taranto | Italy | Portugal | France |

== All-time medal table ==
Updated after the 2026 Mediterranean Games

| Rank | Nation | Gold | Silver | Bronze | Total |
|---|---|---|---|---|---|
| 1 | Italy (ITA) | 49 | 19 | 14 | 82 |
| 2 | Spain (ESP) | 9 | 15 | 16 | 40 |
| 3 | France (FRA) | 7 | 23 | 13 | 43 |
| 4 | Portugal (POR) | 2 | 3 | 2 | 7 |
| 5 | Yugoslavia (YUG) | 1 | 1 | 2 | 4 |
| 6 | Slovenia (SLO) | 0 | 3 | 2 | 5 |
| 7 | Greece (GRE) | 0 | 1 | 3 | 4 |
| 8 | Cyprus (CYP) | 0 | 1 | 1 | 2 |
| 8 | Libya (LBA) | 0 | 1 | 1 | 2 |
| 10 | Tunisia (TUN) | 0 | 1 | 0 | 1 |
| 11 | Morocco (MAR) | 0 | 0 | 8 | 8 |
| 12 | Algeria (ALG) | 0 | 0 | 3 | 3 |
| 13 | Turkey (TUR) | 0 | 0 | 2 | 2 |
| 14 | Serbia (SRB) | 0 | 0 | 1 | 1 |
| Totals (14 entries) | | 68 | 68 | 68 | 204 |
