= Yugoslavia at the Mediterranean Games =

- IOC code: YUG
- NOC: Yugoslav Olympic Committee
- Medals: Gold 194 Silver 173 Bronze 158 Total 525

Mediterranean Games appearances (overview)
- 1951; 1955; 1959; 1963; 1967; 1971; 1975; 1979; 1983; 1987; 1991

Other related appearances
- Bosnia and Herzegovina (1993–pres.); Croatia (1993–pres.); Slovenia (1993–pres.); Serbia and Montenegro (1997–2005); Montenegro (2009–pres.); Serbia (2009–pres.); North Macedonia (2013–pres.); Kosovo (2018–pres.)

The Socialist Federal Republic of Yugoslavia participated at ten Mediterranean Games from 1951 to 1991, with the exception of 1955. Yugoslavia was the host of the Mediterranean Games in 1979 in Split, when it finished first on the medal podium.

After the breakup of Yugoslavia, its former republics continued to compete at the Mediterranean Games:

Nation	First Games	Last Games
Bosnia and Herzegovina	1993	
Croatia	1993	
Slovenia	1993	
(Federal Republic of Yugoslavia) FR Yugoslavia/Serbia and Montenegro	1997	2005
Serbia	2009	
Montenegro	2009	
(North Macedonia) Macedonia	2013	
Kosovo	2018	

== Overview ==
=== By event ===
Games	Athletes	Gold	Silver	Bronze	Total	Rank
1951 Alexandria	17	3	5	7	15	6th
1955 Barcelona	Did not participate					
1959 Beirut	42	11	9	8	28	5th
1963 Naples	126	10	12	11	33	3rd
1967 Tunis		15	16	5	36	2nd
1971 İzmir	161	26	26	26	77	2nd
1975 Algiers	300	24	17	23	64	3rd
1979 Split	409	56	38	33	127	1st
1983 Casablanca	211	16	18	19	53	4th
1987 Latakia	95	17	19	17	53	2nd
1991 Athens	185	16	13	9	38	5th
Total		194	173	158	525	6th

=== Medals by sport ===
Sport	Gold	Silver	Bronze	Total
Athletics	45	48	44	137
Wrestling	36	27	17	80
Boxing	18	14	11	43
Shooting	16	8	11	35
Gymnastics	13	22	12	47
Swimming	10	14	20	44
Table tennis	10	7	10	27
Judo	7	7	14	28
Handball	7	0	0	7
Volleyball	6	2	1	9
Water polo	5	3	0	8
Basketball	5	1	1	7
Tennis	4	3	3	10
Canoeing	3	5	1	9
Rowing	3	4	4	11
Football	2	0	0	2
Weightlifting	1	5	5	11
Cycling	1	1	2	4
Sailing	1	1	1	3
Field hockey	1	0	0	1
Diving	0	1	0	1
Fencing	0	0	1	1
Totals (22 entries)	194	173	158	525

== See also ==
- Yugoslavia at the Olympics
