= Stefano Baudino =

Italian cyclist

Personal information
- Born: 28 December 1963 (age 62) Pinerolo, Italy

Cycling career
- Sport: Cycling
Medal record
Representing Italy
Summer Universiade
Silver medal – second place	1983 Edmonton	1000m time trial
Mediterranean Games
Gold medal – first place	1983 Casablanca	1000m time trial

Stefano Baudino (born 28 December 1963) is an Italian former cyclist. He competed in the 1000m time trial event at the 1984 Summer Olympics.

== Life and career ==
Baudino was born in the town of Pinerolo, Northwestern Italy to his father, Paulo Baudino. He joined the local cycling club at the age of eight, and was guided by his father as well as coach Claudio Godino. Baudino managed his first major achievement at the age of 17, when he competed at the 1981 UCI Junior Track World Championships in Leipzig, claiming bronze in the 1,000m.

The next year, Baudino went on to become the Italian National Champion in the 1,000m and replicated his success in 1983. In the 1984 Summer Olympics, Baudino finished in ninth place in the 1 km time trial.
