= Wrestling at the Mediterranean Games =

Wrestling is one of the sports at the quadrennial Mediterranean Games competition. It has been a sport in the program of the Mediterranean Games since its inception in 1951.

== Editions ==
Games	Year	Host	Winner of the medal table	Second in the medal table	Third in the medal table
I	1951	(Egypt) Alexandria	Turkey	Egypt	Italy
II	1955	(Spain) Barcelona	Turkey	Italy	France
III	1959	(Lebanon) Beirut	Turkey	United Arab Republic	Lebanon
IV	1963	(Italy) Naples	Turkey	Italy	Yugoslavia
V	1967	(Tunisia) Tunis	Turkey	Yugoslavia	Greece
VI	1971	(Turkey) İzmir	Turkey	Yugoslavia	France
VII	1975	(Algeria) Algiers	Turkey	Yugoslavia	France
VIII	1979	(Socialist Federal Republic of Yugoslavia) Split	Yugoslavia	Turkey	Italy
IX	1983	(Morocco) Casablanca	Turkey	Yugoslavia	Italy
X	1987	(Syria) Latakia	Turkey	Yugoslavia	Italy
XI	1991	(Greece) Athens	Turkey	France	Greece
XII	1993	(France) Languedoc-Roussillon	Turkey	France	Egypt
XIII	1997	(Italy) Bari	Turkey	Greece	France
XIV	2001	(Tunisia) Tunis	Turkey	Greece	France
XV	2005	(Spain) Almería	Turkey	Egypt	France
XVI	2009	(Italy) Pescara	Turkey	Egypt	Italy
XVII	2013	(Turkey) Mersin	Turkey	France	Egypt
XVIII	2018	(Spain) Tarragona	Turkey	France	Italy
XIX	2022	(Algeria) Oran	Turkey	Serbia	France
XX	2026	(Italy) Taranto	Turkey	Egypt	Greece

== All-time medal table ==
Updated after the 2026 Mediterranean Games

Rank	Nation	Gold	Silver	Bronze	Total
1	Turkey (TUR)	177	51	53	281
2	Yugoslavia (YUG)	37	28	18	83
3	France (FRA)	30	44	48	122
4	Greece (GRE)	27	53	66	146
5	Italy (ITA)	26	46	68	140
6	Egypt (EGY)	20	51	49	120
7	Syria (SYR)	8	18	32	58
8	Tunisia (TUN)	5	9	14	28
9	Serbia (SRB)	5	4	8	17
10	Spain (ESP)	3	8	20	31
11	Algeria (ALG)	2	6	8	16
12	United Arab Republic (UAR)	2	6	5	13
13	Croatia (CRO)	2	3	7	12
13	North Macedonia (MKD)	2	3	7	12
15	Albania (ALB)	2	2	4	8
16	Lebanon (LIB)	1	7	15	23
17	Serbia and Montenegro (SCG)	1	1	1	3
18	San Marino (SMR)	1	0	1	2
19	Morocco (MAR)	0	8	2	10
20	Cyprus (CYP)	0	2	1	3
21	Slovenia (SLO)	0	1	1	2
22	Bosnia and Herzegovina (BIH)	0	0	1	1
22	Libya (LBA)	0	0	1	1
22	Montenegro (MNE)	0	0	1	1
Totals (24 entries)		351	351	431	1,133
