= Turkey at the Mediterranean Games =

- IOC code: TUR
- NOC: Turkish Olympic Committee
- Medals Ranked 3rd: Gold 427 Silver 297 Bronze 357 Total 1,081

Mediterranean Games appearances (overview)
- 1951; 1955; 1959; 1963; 1967; 1971; 1975; 1979; 1983; 1987; 1991; 1993; 1997; 2001; 2005; 2009; 2013; 2018; 2022; 2026

Turkey participated in all editions of the Mediterranean Games since its establishment in 1951. As of 2025, Turkish athletes have won a total of 1,081 medals, divided into 427 golds, 297 silvers and 357 bronzes. Turkey ranks at third place following Italy and France.

== Medals (1951–2026) ==
Games	Country	Rank	Gold	Silver	Bronze	Total
1951 Alexandria	Egypt	4	10	3	7	20
1955 Barcelona	Spain	5	8	3	3	14
1959 Beirut	Lebanon	3	13	8	1	22
1963 Naples	Italy	2	10	3	4	17
1967 Tunis	Tunisia	4	9	9	6	24
1971 İzmir	Turkey	4	18	12	15	45
1975 Algiers	Algeria	5	12	11	8	31
1979 Split	Yugoslavia	6	5	5	14	24
1983 Casablanca	Morocco	5	12	5	14	31
1987 Latakia	Syria	7	8	9	22	39
1991 Athens	Greece	3	23	11	12	46
1993 Languedoc/Roussillon	France	3	34	20	10	64
1997 Bari	Italy	3	28	16	21	65
2001 Tunis	Tunisia	3	33	16	12	61
2005 Almeria	Spain	4	20	24	29	73
2009 Pescara	Italy	5	18	20	25	63
2013 Mersin	Turkey	2	47	43	35	125
2018 Tarragona	Spain	3	31	25	39	95
2022 Oran	Algeria	2	45	26	37	108
2026 Taranto	Italy	2	41	28	42	111
Total		3	427	297	357	1081

== Medals by sport ==
Updated to 2022 Mediterranean Games

Sport	Men				Women				Mixed				Total			
Sport	Gold	Silver	Bronze	Total	Gold	Silver	Bronze	Total	Gold	Silver	Bronze	Total	Gold	Silver	Bronze	Total
Archery	1	1	1	3	2	2	3	7	1	0	0	1	4	3	4	11
Athletics	19	25	26	70	12	11	15	38	0	0	0	0	31	36	41	108
Badminton	0	2	1	3	5	2	1	8	0	0	0	0	5	4	2	11
Basketball	2	1	3	6	1	2	0	3	0	0	0	0	3	3	3	9
Beach volleyball	2	0	1	3	0	0	0	0	0	0	0	0	2	0	1	3
Bocce	1	1	3	5	5	5	2	12	0	0	0	0	6	6	5	17
Boxing	23	29	38	90	2	1	2	5	0	0	0	0	25	30	40	95
Canoeing	0	0	1	1	0	0	0	0	0	0	0	0	0	0	1	1
Cycling	0	0	3	3	0	0	0	0	0	0	0	0	0	0	3	3
Diving	0	0	0	0	0	0	0	0	0	0	0	0	0	0	0	0
Equestrian	0	0	0	0	0	0	0	0	0	1	2	3	0	1	2	3
Fencing	1	0	0	1	0	1	3	4	0	0	0	0	1	1	3	5
Field hockey	0	0	0	0	0	0	0	0	0	0	0	0	0	0	0	0
Football	1	7	2	10	0	0	0	0	0	0	0	0	1	7	2	10
Golf	0	1	2	3	0	0	0	0	0	0	0	0	0	1	2	3
Gymnastics	9	10	6	25	0	2	0	2	0	0	0	0	9	12	6	27
Handball	0	0	1	1	0	1	0	1	0	0	0	0	0	1	1	2
Judo	5	9	19	33	5	1	15	21	0	0	0	0	10	10	34	54
Karate	5	3	12	20	9	3	11	23	0	0	0	0	14	6	23	43
Rowing	0	5	2	7	0	0	0	0	0	0	0	0	0	5	2	7
Rugby union	0	0	0	0	0	0	0	0	0	0	0	0	0	0	0	0
Sailing	0	1	1	2	0	0	2	2	0	0	0	0	0	1	3	4
Shooting	2	5	6	13	0	1	1	2	0	0	0	0	2	6	7	15
Swimming	3	6	12	21	3	7	15	25	0	0	0	0	6	13	27	46
Table tennis	1	2	3	6	2	1	0	3	0	0	0	0	3	3	3	9
Taekwondo	1	1	7	9	6	2	2	10	0	0	0	0	7	3	9	19
Tennis	0	2	1	3	4	1	1	6	0	0	0	0	4	3	2	9
Volleyball	0	4	4	8	1	7	3	11	0	0	0	0	1	11	7	19
Water polo	0	0	1	1	0	0	0	0	0	0	0	0	0	0	1	1
Water skiing	0	0	0	0	0	0	0	0	0	0	0	0	0	0	0	0
Weightlifting	63	41	21	125	21	11	10	42	0	0	0	0	84	52	31	167
Wrestling	154	40	48	242	10	8	0	18	0	0	0	0	164	48	48	260
Grand total													384	269	314	967
