= Cycling at the 1979 Mediterranean Games =

The cycling races at the 1979 Mediterranean Games were held in Split, Croatia, Yugoslavia.

== Medal summary ==
=== Medalists ===
| Event | Gold | | Silver | | Bronze | |
|---|---|---|---|---|---|---|
| Road race | Régis Clère; France | 4h 19' 50" | Francis Castaing; France | s.t. | Mustapha Najjari; Morocco | s.t. |
| Team time trial | Italy (ITA); Mauro De Pellegrini; Gianni Giacomini; Ivano Maffei; Alberto Minetti | 2h 08' 51" | Spain (ESP); Miguel Acha; Eduardo Chozas; Antonio Coll; Jesús Guzmán | +4' 49" | Yugoslavia (YUG); Bruno Bulić; Drago Frelih; Janez Novak; Bojan Udovič | +7' 38" |
