= France at the Mediterranean Games =

- IOC code: FRA
- NOC: French National Olympic and Sports Committee
- Medals Ranked 2nd: Gold 677 Silver 621 Bronze 611 Total 1,909

Mediterranean Games appearances (overview)
- 1951; 1955; 1959; 1963; 1967; 1971; 1975; 1979; 1983; 1987; 1991; 1993; 1997; 2001; 2005; 2009; 2013; 2018; 2022; 2026

France has competed at every celebration of the Mediterranean Games since the 1951 Mediterranean Games. As of 2026, French athletes have won a total of 1,909 medals.

== Medal tables ==
=== Medals by Mediterranean Games ===
Host nation

Below the table representing all French medals around the games. As of the completion of the 2026 Games, France had won 1,909 medals, 677 of them gold.

Games	Athletes	Gold	Silver	Bronze	Total	Rank
1951 Alexandria	42	26	13	5	44	2nd
1955 Barcelona	278	39	29	31	99	1st
1959 Beirut	66	26	27	16	69	1st
1963 Naples	72	8	14	8	30	3rd
1967 Tunis	68	7	4	4	15	5th
1971 İzmir	50	7	9	7	23	7th
1975 Algiers	164	31	25	23	79	2nd
1979 Split	287	55	40	34	129	2nd
1983 Casablanca	233	32	39	26	97	2nd
1987 Latakia	191	16	30	22	68	3rd
1991 Athens	306	48	57	34	139	2nd
1993 Languedoc-Roussillon	413	83	53	56	192	1st
1997 Bari	302	55	44	47	146	2nd
2001 Tunis	309	40	32	50	122	1st
2005 Almería	368	56	51	46	153	2nd
2009 Pescara	359	49	53	41	142	2nd
2013 Mersin		25	25	46	96	3rd
2018 Tarragona	310	28	31	41	99	4th
2022 Oran	313	21	24	36	81	3rd
2026 Taranto	330	25	21	42	88	4th
Total		677	621	611	1909	2nd

=== Medals by sport ===
Leading in that sport

Sport	Gold	Silver	Bronze	Total
Athletics	155	130	106	391
Swimming	116	96	74	286
Gymnastics	58	73	59	190
Judo	43	27	38	108
Fencing	33	25	33	91
Wrestling	30	44	48	122
Weightlifting	28	29	36	93
Rowing	26	15	10	51
Boxing	23	17	38	78
Shooting	22	17	21	60
Sailing	21	17	13	51
Karate	17	14	19	50
Boules	17	9	11	37
Archery	13	4	10	27
Canoeing	11	18	17	46
Table tennis	11	11	12	34
Equestrian	11	6	3	20
Bocce	10	4	7	21
Cycling	7	23	13	43
Golf	6	13	5	24
Diving	5	4	3	12
Waterskiing	4	7	0	11
Rugby union	4	0	0	4
Handball	3	6	1	10
Volleyball	3	4	6	13
Badminton	3	4	5	12
3x3 basketball	3	1	1	5
Taekwondo	2	3	7	12
Football	2	3	3	8
Finswimming	2	2	6	10
Skateboarding	2	1	0	3
Tennis	1	2	2	5
Beach volleyball	1	1	3	5
Roller speed skating	1	0	0	1
Basketball	0	2	3	5
Water polo	0	1	2	3
Field hockey	0	0	1	1
Padel	0	0	1	1
Roller hockey	0	0	1	1
Triathlon	0	0	1	1
Totals (40 entries)	694	633	619	1,946

== Athletics ==
#	Venue and Year	Men				Women				Total			
#	Venue and Year	Gold medal	Silver medal	Bronze medal	Tot.	Gold medal	Silver medal	Bronze medal	Tot.	Gold medal	Silver medal	Bronze medal	Tot.
1	(Egypt) Alexandria 1951	9	4	0	13	–	–	–	–	9	4	0	13
2	(Spain) Barcelona 1955	10	10	8	28	–	–	–	–	10	10	8	28
3	(Lebanon) Beirut 1959	11	5	3	19	–	–	–	–	11	5	3	19
4	(Italy) Naples 1963	5	9	6	20	–	–	–	–	5	9	6	20
5	(Tunisia) Tunis 1967	1	1	1	3	1	0	0	1	2	1	1	4
6	(Turkey) İzmir 1971	3	0	1	4	1	2	2	5	4	2	3	9
7	(Algeria) Algiers 1975	3	2	3	8	2	0	3	5	5	2	6	13
8	(Socialist Federal Republic of Yugoslavia) Split 1979	8	6	2	16	5	2	1	8	13	8	3	24
9	(Morocco) Casablanca 1983	5	8	2	15	8	4	3	15	13	12	5	30
10	(Syria) Latakia 1987	1	2	4	7	3	3	4	10	4	5	8	17
11	(Greece) Athens 1991	5	2	4	11	4	6	4	14	9	8	8	25
12	(France) Narbonne 1993	7	5	5	17	8	8	5	21	15	13	10	38
13	(Italy) Bari 1997	5	2	2	9	5	4	5	14	10	6	7	23
14	(Tunisia) Tunis 2001	2	2	5	9	7	4	3	14	9	6	8	23
15	(Spain) Almeria 2005	4	5	6	15	6	8	1	15	10	13	7	30
16	(Italy) Pescara 2009	3	8	1	12	4	4	2	9	7	12	3	22
17	(Turkey) Mersin 2013	2	2	3	7	2	0	2	5	4	2	5	11
18	(Spain) Tarragona 2018												
19	(Algeria) Oran 2022												
Total		84	73	56	213	56	45	35	136	140	118	91	349

== See also ==
- France at the Olympics
- France at the Paralympics
- Sports in France
