= Italy at the Mediterranean Games =

- IOC code: ITA
- NOC: Italian National Olympic Committee
- Medals Ranked 1st: Gold 997 Silver 869 Bronze 825 Total 2,691

Mediterranean Games appearances (overview)
- 1951; 1955; 1959; 1963; 1967; 1971; 1975; 1979; 1983; 1987; 1991; 1993; 1997; 2001; 2005; 2009; 2013; 2018; 2022; 2026

Italy has competed at every celebration of the Mediterranean Games since the 1951 Mediterranean Games. As of 2022, the Italian athletes have won a total of 2467 medals as the games record.

== Medal count ==
Host nation

Below the table representing all Italians medals around the games. Till now, Italy win 2,307 medals as Games record.

Games	Athletes	Gold	Silver	Bronze	Total	Rank	Notes
1951 Alexandria	99	27	22	12	61	1	details
1955 Barcelona	195	32	27	22	81	2	details
1959 Beirut	55	12	5	4	21	4	details
1963 Naples	117	32	21	16	69	1	details
1967 Tunis		35	26	22	83	1	details
1971 İzmir	162	51	38	30	119	1	details
1975 Algiers	269	51	40	36	127	1	details
1979 Split	368	49	63	47	159	3	details
1983 Casablanca	274	53	43	46	142	1	details
1987 Latakia	263	69	45	38	152	1	details
1991 Athens	403	67	49	52	168	1	details
1993 Languedoc-Roussillon	345	37	44	40	121	2	details
1997 Bari	410	76	62	55	193	1	details
2001 Tunis	329	38	59	39	136	2	details
2005 Almería	397	57	40	56	153	1	details
2009 Pescara	418	64	49	63	176	1	details
2013 Mersin	419	69	52	64	185	1	details
2018 Tarragona	502	56	55	45	156	1	details
2022 Oran	371	48	50	61	159	1	details
2026 Taranto	498	74	78	72	224	1	details
Total		997	869	825	2,691	1	

== Medals by sport ==
Update to 2013 Mediterranean Games

Leading in that sport
Dropped from the current Mediterranean Games program

Sport	Gold	Silver	Bronze	Total	Rank
Archery	5	9	4	18	2
Athletics	167	147	112	426	1
Basketball	5	6	3	14	1
Bocce	12	4	5	21	1
Boxing	40	25	44	109	1
Canoeing	19	16	16	51	1
Cycling	41	16	11	68	1
Football	4	2	0	6	1
Fencing	36	33	28	97	1
Gymnastics	67	69	63	199	1
Handball	1	2	2	5	5
Judo	26	26	33	85	2
Karate	13	9	24	46	2
Rowing	29	21	13	63	1
Sailing	20	12	10	42	1
Shooting	45	32	21	98	1
Swimming	178	142	120	440	1
Taekwondo	0	1	2	3	6
Table tennis	5	6	8	19	3
Tennis	15	11	16	42	2
Volleyball	15	4	6	25	1
Water skiing	4	1	4	9	2
Water polo	6	6	2	14	1
Weightlifting	23	28	22	73	5
Golf	6	3	6	15	3
Field hockey	0	0	2	2	4
Equestrian	3	6	3	12	3
Roller hockey	1	0	0	1	1
Rugby union	0	4	0	4	2
Diving	14	12	5	31	1
Wrestling	25	38	60	123	4
Total	820	686	647	2153	1

== Athletics ==
#	Venue and Year	Men				Women				Total			
#	Venue and Year	1st place, gold medalist(s)	2nd place, silver medalist(s)	3rd place, bronze medalist(s)	Tot.	1st place, gold medalist(s)	2nd place, silver medalist(s)	3rd place, bronze medalist(s)	Tot.	1st place, gold medalist(s)	2nd place, silver medalist(s)	3rd place, bronze medalist(s)	Tot.
1	(Egypt) Alexandria 1951	6	4	2	12	-	-	-	-	6	4	2	12
2	(Spain) Barcelona 1955	9	3	5	17	-	-	-	-	9	3	5	17
3	(Lebanon) Beirut 1959	-	-	-	-	-	-	-	-	-	-	-	-
4	(Italy) Naples 1963	8	5	6	19	-	-	-	-	8	5	6	19
5	(Tunisia) Tunis 1967	12	5	3	20	2	1	3	6	14	6	6	26
6	(Turkey) İzmir 1971	9	5	2	16	3	6	0	9	12	11	2	25
7	(Algeria) Algiers 1975	6	5	5	16	4	5	1	10	10	10	6	26
8	(Socialist Federal Republic of Yugoslavia) Split 1979	8	6	4	18	5	6	4	15	13	12	8	33
9	(Morocco) Casablanca 1983	7	6	8	21	3	5	5	13	10	11	13	34
10	(Syria) Latakia 1987	11	4	4	19	6	6	4	16	17	10	8	35
11	(Greece) Athens 1991	8	11	7	26	3	6	3	12	11	17	10	38
12	(France) Narbonne 1993	3	3	3	9	4	2	2	8	7	5	5	17
13	(Italy) Bari 1997	6	9	6	21	5	4	5	14	11	13	11	35
14	(Tunisia) Tunis 2001	6	6	4	16	3	8	3	13	9	14	7	30
15	(Spain) Almeria 2005	2	4	3	9	5	4	4	13	7	8	7	22
16	(Italy) Pescara 2009	4	4	2	10	7	7	5	19	11	11	7	29
17	(Turkey) Mersin 2013	6	1	5	13	7	4	4	14	13	5	9	27
18	(Spain) Tarragona 2018	4	3	5	12	3	5	3	11	7	8	8	23
19	(Algeria) Oran 2022	1	3	4	8	4	3	3	10	5	6	7	18
Total		115	88	78	282	64	72	49	183	180	159	127	466

== Swimming ==
#	Venue and Year	Total			
#	Venue and Year	1st place, gold medalist(s)	2nd place, silver medalist(s)	3rd place, bronze medalist(s)	Tot.
1	(Egypt) Alexandria 1951	0	3	2	5
2	(Spain) Barcelona 1955	0	4	3	7
3	(Lebanon) Beirut 1959	5	0	2	7
4	(Italy) Naples 1963	3	3	2	8
5	(Tunisia) Tunis 1967	4	7	2	13
6	(Turkey) İzmir 1971	14	8	6	28
7	(Algeria) Algiers 1975	12	6	4	22
8	(Socialist Federal Republic of Yugoslavia) Split 1979	14	12	15	41
9	(Morocco) Casablanca 1983	17	10	8	35
10	(Syria) Latakia 1987	24	13	8	45
11	(Greece) Athens 1991	13	7	8	28
12	(France) Narbonne 1993	4	10	6	20
13	(Italy) Bari 1997	16	7	8	31
14	(Tunisia) Tunis 2001	8	10	10	28
15	(Spain) Almeria 2005	12	8	10	30
16	(Italy) Pescara 2009	12	13	14	39
17	(Turkey) Mersin 2013	20	19	12	51
18	(Spain) Tarragona 2018	22	13	8	43
19	(Algeria) Oran 2022	15	7	14	36
20	(Italy) Taranto 2026	19	22	10	51
Total		248	193	162	603

== See also ==
- Italy at the Olympics
- Italy at the Paralympics
- Italy at the Summer Universiade
