= Boxing at the Mediterranean Games =

Boxing competitions

Boxing is one of the sports at the quadrennial Mediterranean Games competition. It has been one of the sports competed at the event since the inaugural edition in 1951.

== Editions ==
Games	Year	Host city	Host country	Events		Best nation
Games	Year	Host city	Host country	Men	Women	Best nation
I	1951	Alexandria	Egypt	10	—	Egypt (EGY)
II	1955	Barcelona	Spain	10	—	France (FRA)
III	1959	Beirut	Lebanon	10	—	United Arab Republic (UAR)
IV	1963	Naples	Italy	10	—	Italy (ITA)
V	1967	Tunis	Tunisia	10	—	Italy (ITA)
VI	1971	İzmir	Turkey	11	—	Egypt (EGY)
VII	1975	Algiers	Algeria	11	—	Italy (ITA)
VIII	1979	Split	Yugoslavia	11	—	Yugoslavia (YUG)
IX	1983	Casablanca	Morocco	11	—	Tunisia (TUN)
X	1987	Latakia	Syria	12	—	Yugoslavia (YUG)
XI	1991	Athens	Greece	12	—	Syria (SYR)
XII	1993	Narbonne	France	12	—	Turkey (TUR)
XIII	1997	Bari	Italy	12	—	Italy (ITA)
XIV	2001	Tunis	Tunisia	12	—	Turkey (TUR)
XV	2005	Almería	Spain	11	—	Italy (ITA)
XVI	2009	Pescara	Italy	11	—	Italy (ITA)
XVII	2013	Mersin	Turkey	10	—	Algeria (ALG)
XVIII	2018	Tarragona	Spain	9	—	Egypt (EGY)
XIX	2022	Oran	Algeria	9	6	Algeria (ALG)
XIX	2026	Taranto	Italy	7	7	Spain (ESP)

== All-time medal table ==
Updated after the 2026 Mediterranean Games

Rank	Nation	Gold	Silver	Bronze	Total
1	Italy (ITA)	49	29	52	130
2	Egypt (EGY)	27	26	38	91
3	Turkey (TUR)	26	31	45	102
4	France (FRA)	23	17	38	78
5	Algeria (ALG)	22	22	28	72
6	Yugoslavia (YUG)	19	14	13	46
7	Tunisia (TUN)	18	15	32	65
8	Morocco (MAR)	12	18	40	70
9	Spain (ESP)	9	21	31	61
10	Syria (SYR)	6	9	18	33
11	Greece (GRE)	4	4	35	43
12	United Arab Republic (UAR)	3	1	3	7
13	Croatia (CRO)	1	5	7	13
14	Serbia (SRB)	1	3	9	13
15	Montenegro (MNE)	1	2	3	6
16	Bosnia and Herzegovina (BIH)	1	0	4	5
17	Kosovo (KOS)	1	0	1	2
18	Lebanon (LIB)	0	3	6	9
19	Serbia and Montenegro (SCG)	0	1	3	4
20	Cyprus (CYP)	0	1	2	3
21	Albania (ALB)	0	1	1	2
22	North Macedonia (MKD)	0	0	2	2
23	Slovenia (SLO)	0	0	1	1
Totals (23 entries)		223	223	412	858

== See also ==
- Boxing at the All-Africa Games
