= Spain at the Mediterranean Games =

- IOC code: ESP
- NOC: Spanish Olympic Committee
- Medals Ranked 4th: Gold 363 Silver 509 Bronze 597 Total 1,469

Mediterranean Games appearances (overview)
- 1951; 1955; 1959; 1963; 1967; 1971; 1975; 1979; 1983; 1987; 1991; 1993; 1997; 2001; 2005; 2009; 2013; 2018; 2022; 2026

Spain has competed at every celebration of the Mediterranean Games since the 1951 Mediterranean Games. As of 2026, Spanish athletes have won a total of 1,469 medals .

== Medal tables ==
=== Medals by Mediterranean Games ===
Host nation

Games	Athletes	Gold	Silver	Bronze	Total	Rank
1951 Alexandria	36	2	4	4	10	7
1955 Barcelona	287	12	15	18	45	3
1959 Beirut	83	5	12	12	29	7
1963 Naples	108	4	4	12	20	6
1967 Tunis		10	14	27	51	3
1971 İzmir	148	18	25	24	67	3
1975 Algiers	238	14	27	29	70	4
1979 Split	263	16	20	32	68	4
1983 Casablanca	184	17	20	27	64	3
1987 Latakia	194	15	21	33	69	4
1991 Athens	339	22	39	49	110	4
1993 Languedoc-Roussillon	339	13	40	33	86	5
1997 Bari	338	18	30	47	95	4
2001 Tunis	301	31	26	41	98	4
2005 Almería	463	45	59	48	152	3
2009 Pescara	249	28	21	35	84	3
2013 Mersin	175	21	32	29	82	4
2018 Tarragona	396	38	40	44	122	2
2022 Oran	282	16	25	25	66	5
2026 Taranto	249	18	35	28	81	6
Total		363	509	597	1469	4

=== Medals by sport ===
Leading in that sport

Sport	Gold	Silver	Bronze	Total
Swimming	65	115	126	306
Gymnastics	63	43	51	157
Athletics	39	80	95	214
Canoeing	23	15	15	53
Weightlifting	19	32	32	83
Golf	18	7	8	33
Tennis	17	23	19	59
Shooting	16	23	17	56
Judo	15	16	38	69
Boxing	9	21	31	61
Karate	9	16	16	41
Cycling	9	15	16	40
Taekwondo	9	3	6	18
Sailing	8	13	12	33
Handball	5	4	7	16
Archery	4	7	8	19
Water polo	4	4	7	15
Basketball	4	4	4	12
Wrestling	3	8	20	31
Equestrian	3	5	8	16
Table tennis	3	4	8	15
Beach volleyball	3	4	2	9
Football	3	1	2	6
3x3 basketball	3	1	1	5
Boules	2	10	3	15
Fencing	2	8	19	29
Rowing	2	6	14	22
Badminton	2	5	2	9
Padel	2	1	0	3
Volleyball	1	5	1	7
Field hockey	1	2	0	3
Triathlon	0	3	2	5
Roller hockey	0	1	0	1
Roller speed skating	0	1	0	1
Rugby union	0	0	2	2
Finswimming	0	0	1	1
Skateboarding	0	0	1	1
Totals (37 entries)	366	506	594	1,466

== See also ==
- Spain at the Olympics
- Spain at the Paralympics
- Sports in Spain
