= Cycling at the 1983 Mediterranean Games =

The cycling races at the 1983 Mediterranean Games were held in Casablanca, Morocco.

== Medalists ==
=== Road cycling ===
Event	Gold		Silver		Bronze	
Road race	Bojan Ropret; Yugoslavia	4h 53' 39"	Kanellos Kanellopoulos; Greece	s.t.	Francesco Cesarini; Italy	s.t.
Team time trial	Italy (ITA)	2h 07' 27"	Yugoslavia (YUG); Bojan Ropret; Bruno Bulić; Marko Cuderman; Janez Lampič	+2' 10"	France (FRA)	+4' 17"

=== Track cycling ===
Games	Gold	Silver	Bronze
Individual pursuit	Maurizio Colombo (ITA)	Gianpaolo Grisandi (ITA)	Didier Garcia (FRA)
Sprint	Gabriele Sella (ITA)	Philippe Boyer (FRA)	Franck Depine (FRA)
Time trial	Stefano Baudino (ITA)	Philippe Boyer (FRA)	Farouk Hamza (ALG)
