= Gymnastics at the Mediterranean Games =

Gymnastics is one of the sports at the quadrennial Mediterranean Games competition. It has been a sport in the program of the Mediterranean Games since its inception in 1951. Two disciplines have been contested: Men's and Women's Artistic Gymnastics (since 1951) and Rhythmic Gymnastics (since 2005), exclusively for women.

== Editions (Artistic) ==
Games	Year	Host	Winner of the medal table	Second in the medal table	Third in the medal table
I	1951	(Egypt) Alexandria	France	Italy	Egypt
II	1955	(Spain) Barcelona	Spain	France	Italy
III	1959	(Lebanon) Beirut	United Arab Republic	France	Spain
IV	1963	(Italy) Naples	Italy	Yugoslavia	(United Arab Republic) Egypt
V	1967	(Tunisia) Tunis	Italy	Yugoslavia	Spain
VI	1971	(Turkey) İzmir	Italy	Yugoslavia	Spain
VII	1975	(Algeria) Algiers	France	Italy	Spain
VIII	1979	(Socialist Federal Republic of Yugoslavia) Split	France	Italy	Spain
IX	1983	(Morocco) Casablanca	France	Spain	Italy
X	1987	(Syria) Latakia	Italy	Spain	Syria
XI	1991	(Greece) Athens	Italy	Spain	France
XII	1993	(France) Languedoc-Roussillon	France	Italy	Spain
XIII	1997	(Italy) Bari	France	Spain	Italy
XIV	2001	(Tunisia) Tunis	Spain	France	Greece
XV	2005	(Spain) Almería	Spain	Italy	Tunisia
XVI	2009	(Italy) Pescara	France	Italy	Greece
XVII	2013	(Turkey) Mersin	Italy	Spain	Greece
XVIII	2018	(Spain) Tarragona	France	Italy	Turkey
XIX	2022	(Algeria) Oran	Italy	Turkey	Croatia
XX	2026	(Italy) Taranto	Italy	Turkey	Algeria

== Editions (Rhythmic) ==
Games	Year	Host	Winner of the medal table	Second in the medal table	Third in the medal table
XV	2005	(Spain) Almería	Spain	France	Greece
XVI	2009	(Italy) Pescara	Italy	France	Spain
XVII	2013	(Turkey) Mersin	Spain	Greece	France
XVIII	2018	(Spain) Tarragona	Italy	Greece	—N/a
XIX	2022	(Algeria) Oran	Not part of the program		
XX	2026	(Italy) Taranto	Turkey	Spain	Italy

== All-time medal table ==
1951–2026
Rank	Nation	Gold	Silver	Bronze	Total
1	Italy (ITA)	83	83	72	238
2	Spain (ESP)	63	43	51	157
3	France (FRA)	58	73	59	190
4	Yugoslavia (YUG)	13	22	12	47
5	Turkey (TUR)	12	12	8	32
6	Greece (GRE)	9	11	15	35
7	Egypt (EGY)	5	6	15	26
8	United Arab Republic (UAR)	5	4	5	14
9	Cyprus (CYP)	5	4	3	12
10	Algeria (ALG)	4	2	1	7
11	Slovenia (SLO)	2	3	7	12
12	Tunisia (TUN)	2	1	3	6
13	Morocco (MAR)	2	1	0	3
14	Croatia (CRO)	1	6	0	7
15	Syria (SYR)	1	0	0	1
16	Portugal (POR)	0	0	1	1
Totals (16 entries)		265	271	252	788

== Best results by event and nation ==
Event		(Algeria) ALG	(Croatia) CRO	(Cyprus) CYP	(Egypt) EGY	(Spain) ESP	(France) FRA	(Greece) GRE	(Italy) ITA	(Morocco) MAR	(Portugal) POR	(Slovenia) SLO	(Syria) SYR	(Tunisia) TUN	(Turkey) TUR	(United Arab Republic) UAR	(Socialist Federal Republic of Yugoslavia) YUG
M A G
M A G	Team				3rd place, bronze medalist(s)	1st place, gold medalist(s)	1st place, gold medalist(s)		1st place, gold medalist(s)			3rd place, bronze medalist(s)			1st place, gold medalist(s)	1st place, gold medalist(s)	1st place, gold medalist(s)
M A G	All-Around			1st place, gold medalist(s)	3rd place, bronze medalist(s)	1st place, gold medalist(s)	1st place, gold medalist(s)		1st place, gold medalist(s)						1st place, gold medalist(s)	2nd place, silver medalist(s)	1st place, gold medalist(s)
M A G	Floor Exercise		2nd place, silver medalist(s)		3rd place, bronze medalist(s)	1st place, gold medalist(s)	1st place, gold medalist(s)	1st place, gold medalist(s)	1st place, gold medalist(s)			3rd place, bronze medalist(s)	1st place, gold medalist(s)	2nd place, silver medalist(s)	2nd place, silver medalist(s)	1st place, gold medalist(s)	2nd place, silver medalist(s)
M A G	Pommel Horse	1st place, gold medalist(s)	1st place, gold medalist(s)	3rd place, bronze medalist(s)	2nd place, silver medalist(s)	1st place, gold medalist(s)	1st place, gold medalist(s)	3rd place, bronze medalist(s)	1st place, gold medalist(s)	2nd place, silver medalist(s)		1st place, gold medalist(s)			3rd place, bronze medalist(s)		1st place, gold medalist(s)
M A G	Still Rings		2nd place, silver medalist(s)	2nd place, silver medalist(s)	1st place, gold medalist(s)	1st place, gold medalist(s)	1st place, gold medalist(s)	1st place, gold medalist(s)	1st place, gold medalist(s)						1st place, gold medalist(s)	1st place, gold medalist(s)	1st place, gold medalist(s)
M A G	Vault				1st place, gold medalist(s)	1st place, gold medalist(s)	1st place, gold medalist(s)	3rd place, bronze medalist(s)	1st place, gold medalist(s)	1st place, gold medalist(s)				1st place, gold medalist(s)	1st place, gold medalist(s)	1st place, gold medalist(s)	2nd place, silver medalist(s)
M A G	Parallel Bars			2nd place, silver medalist(s)	2nd place, silver medalist(s)	1st place, gold medalist(s)	1st place, gold medalist(s)	1st place, gold medalist(s)	1st place, gold medalist(s)			1st place, gold medalist(s)			1st place, gold medalist(s)	1st place, gold medalist(s)	1st place, gold medalist(s)
M A G	Horizontal Bar		2nd place, silver medalist(s)	1st place, gold medalist(s)	2nd place, silver medalist(s)	1st place, gold medalist(s)	1st place, gold medalist(s)	1st place, gold medalist(s)	1st place, gold medalist(s)			2nd place, silver medalist(s)			1st place, gold medalist(s)	1st place, gold medalist(s)	1st place, gold medalist(s)
W A G
W A G	Team	3rd place, bronze medalist(s)				1st place, gold medalist(s)	1st place, gold medalist(s)	3rd place, bronze medalist(s)	1st place, gold medalist(s)								2nd place, silver medalist(s)
W A G	All-Around	1st place, gold medalist(s)				1st place, gold medalist(s)	1st place, gold medalist(s)	3rd place, bronze medalist(s)	1st place, gold medalist(s)								2nd place, silver medalist(s)
W A G	Vault				1st place, gold medalist(s)	1st place, gold medalist(s)	1st place, gold medalist(s)	2nd place, silver medalist(s)	1st place, gold medalist(s)			2nd place, silver medalist(s)		1st place, gold medalist(s)	2nd place, silver medalist(s)		2nd place, silver medalist(s)
W A G	Uneven Bars	1st place, gold medalist(s)				1st place, gold medalist(s)	1st place, gold medalist(s)		1st place, gold medalist(s)		3rd place, bronze medalist(s)	3rd place, bronze medalist(s)					2nd place, silver medalist(s)
W A G	Balance Beam	1st place, gold medalist(s)				1st place, gold medalist(s)	1st place, gold medalist(s)	1st place, gold medalist(s)	1st place, gold medalist(s)								1st place, gold medalist(s)
W A G	Floor Exercise					1st place, gold medalist(s)	1st place, gold medalist(s)	2nd place, silver medalist(s)	1st place, gold medalist(s)						2nd place, silver medalist(s)		2nd place, silver medalist(s)
R G	All-Around					1st place, gold medalist(s)	2nd place, silver medalist(s)	2nd place, silver medalist(s)	1st place, gold medalist(s)						1st place, gold medalist(s)		
