= Canoeing at the Mediterranean Games =

Canoeing has been featured as competition sports in the Mediterranean Games irregularly. It has appeared in the 1979, 1991-1997, 2005-2018 and 2026 Mediterranean Games.

Two styles of boats are or have been used in this sport: canoes with 1 or 2 canoers and kayaks with 1, 2 or 4 kayakers. This leads to the name designation of each event. For example, "C-1" is a canoe singles event and "K-2" is a kayak doubles event. Races are usually 500 metres or 1000 metres long, although there are other distances.

== Summary ==
Games	Year	Events	Best Nation
VIII	1979	13	France
XI	1991	8	Spain
XII	1993	8	Spain
XIII	1997	10	Italy
XV	2005	6	Italy
XVI	2009	6	Italy
XVII	2013	6	Slovenia
XVIII	2018	5	Spain
XX	2026	6	Italy

== Events ==
Event		1979	1991	1993	1997	2005	2009	2013	2018	2026
Men's C-1 500 m	Gold	YUG	ITA	FRA	ESP					
Men's C-1 500 m	Silver	ESP	FRA	ESP	ITA					
Men's C-1 500 m	Bronze	FRA	ESP	CRO	ITA					
Men's C-1 1000 m	Gold	YUG	ITA	ESP	ESP					ITA
Men's C-1 1000 m	Silver	FRA	FRA	FRA	FRA					POR
Men's C-1 1000 m	Bronze	ITA	ESP	CRO	CRO					FRA
Men's C-2 500 m	Gold	YUG	ESP	ESP	FRA					
Men's C-2 500 m	Silver	ESP	ITA	FRA	ITA					
Men's C-2 500 m	Bronze	FRA	FRA	CRO	ESP					
Men's C-2 1000 m	Gold	ESP	ESP	FRA	ESP					
Men's C-2 1000 m	Silver	FRA	ITA	ESP	FRA					
Men's C-2 1000 m	Bronze	ITA	FRA	ITA	ESP					
Men's K-1 200 m	Gold							SRB	ESP	
Men's K-1 200 m	Silver							ITA	SRB	
Men's K-1 200 m	Bronze							ESP	FRA	
Men's K-1 500 m	Gold	ITA	ESP	ITA	ITA	FRA	ESP		ESP	
Men's K-1 500 m	Silver	YUG	FRA	ESP	ESP	ESP	CRO		POR	
Men's K-1 500 m	Bronze	ESP	ITA	CRO	ITA	ITA	ESP		FRA	
Men's K-1 1000 m	Gold	ITA	ESP	ITA	FRA	CRO	ITA	ESP		POR
Men's K-1 1000 m	Silver	YUG	FRA	ESP	ITA	FRA	SRB	SLO		ITA
Men's K-1 1000 m	Bronze	ESP	YUG	CRO	FRA	SLO	CRO	ITA		SRB
Men's K-2 200 m	Gold							ESP		
Men's K-2 200 m	Silver							ITA		
Men's K-2 200 m	Bronze							TUR		
Men's K-2 500 m	Gold	FRA	FRA	ESP	ITA	CRO	ESP		ESP	SRB
Men's K-2 500 m	Silver	ESP	ESP	ITA	ITA	ESP	FRA		FRA	POR
Men's K-2 500 m	Bronze	ITA	ITA	FRA	ESP	SCG	ITA		SRB	ITA
Men's K-2 1000 m	Gold	FRA	FRA	ITA	ITA	ESP	ITA	ITA		
Men's K-2 1000 m	Silver	YUG	ESP	ESP	ITA	FRA	FRA	SRB		
Men's K-2 1000 m	Bronze	ESP	ITA	FRA	FRA	ITA	SRB	ESP		
Men's K-4 500 m	Gold	ESP								
Men's K-4 500 m	Silver	ITA								
Men's K-4 500 m	Bronze	FRA								
Men's K-4 1000 m	Gold	ESP								
Men's K-4 1000 m	Silver	ITA								
Men's K-4 1000 m	Bronze	FRA								
Women's K-1 200 m	Gold							SLO	ESP	
Women's K-1 200 m	Silver							ITA	FRA	
Women's K-1 200 m	Bronze							SRB	POR	
Women's K-1 500 m	Gold	FRA			ITA	ITA	SLO	SLO	SRB	POR
Women's K-1 500 m	Silver	ITA			FRA	ESP	ESP	ITA	POR	CYP
Women's K-1 500 m	Bronze	ESP			ESP	FRA	ITA	SRB	SLO	SRB
Women's K-1 1000 m	Gold					ITA	ITA			
Women's K-1 1000 m	Silver					ITA	SRB			
Women's K-1 1000 m	Bronze					FRA	ITA			
Women's K-2 500 m	Gold	ITA			ITA					ESP
Women's K-2 500 m	Silver	YUG			FRA					ITA
Women's K-2 500 m	Bronze	FRA			ESP					FRA
Women's K-4 500 m	Gold	FRA								
Women's K-4 500 m	Silver	YUG								
Women's K-4 500 m	Bronze	ITA								
Women's C-1 200 m	Gold									ITA
Women's C-1 200 m	Silver									CRO
Women's C-1 200 m	Bronze									ESP

== Overall medal table ==
Updated after the 2026 Mediterranean Games.

Rank	Nation	Gold	Silver	Bronze	Total
1	Spain (ESP)	23	15	15	53
2	Italy (ITA)	21	18	14	53
3	France (FRA)	11	18	17	46
4	Yugoslavia (YUG)	3	5	1	9
5	Serbia (SRB)	3	4	5	12
6	Slovenia (SLO)	3	1	2	6
7	Portugal (POR)	2	4	1	7
8	Croatia (CRO)	2	2	6	10
9	Turkey (TUR)	0	1	1	2
10	Cyprus (CYP)	0	1	0	1
11	Serbia and Montenegro (SCG)	0	0	1	1
Totals (11 entries)		68	69	63	200
