= Mediterranean Games =

Multi-sport event of the Mediterranean countries

- Purpose: Multi-sport event for nations on the Mediterranean Sea
- Frequency: Every four years
- Inaugurated: 1951 Mediterranean Games in Alexandria, Egypt
- Most recent: 2026 Mediterranean Games in Taranto, Italy
- Next event: 2030 Mediterranean Games in Prishtina, Kosovo
- President: Francesco Purromuto
- Website: www.cijm.org.gr

The Mediterranean Games is a multi-sport event organised by the International Committee of Mediterranean Games (CIJM). It is held every four years among athletes from countries bordering the Mediterranean Sea in Africa, Asia and Europe. The first Mediterranean Games were held in 1951 in Alexandria, Egypt, while the most recent games were held in 2026 in Taranto, Italy. The idea was proposed at the 1948 Summer Olympics by Muhammed Taher Pasha. At present, 26 countries participate in the games.

== History ==
The idea was proposed at the 1948 Summer Olympics by Muhammed Taher Pasha, chairman of the Egyptian Olympic Committee and vice-president of the International Olympic Committee (I.O.C.), assisted by Greek member of the I.O.C. Ioannis Ketseas. Separate Mediterranean sports events preceded the games. From 1947 to 1949, the Mediterranean Athletics Championships were contested, and the Mediterranean Cup football competition was held in 1949 and 1950. The first official Mediterranean Games were held in Egypt in 1951.

The Games were inaugurated in October 1951, in Alexandria, Egypt, in honour of Muhammed Taher Pasha, with contests being held in 13 sports and 734 athletes from 10 countries participating. During the II Games, held in 1955 in Barcelona, a Supervisory and Controlling Body for the Games was established to function as a kind of executive committee. The decisions were finally materialized on 16 June 1961, and the said Body was named, upon a Greek notion, the ICMG (International Committee for the Mediterranean Games). Twelve countries have hosted the Mediterranean Games, including four from Africa: Egypt (1951), Tunisia (1967, 2001), Algeria (1975, 2022) and Morocco (1983); six from Europe: Spain (1955, 2005, 2018), Italy (1963, 1997, 2009), Turkey (1971, 2013), Yugoslavia (1979), Greece (1991) and France (1993); and two from Asia: Lebanon (1959) and Syria (1987).

The first eleven games took place one year before the nearest Summer Olympic Games. Since 1993, the games have been held the year after the Olympic Games. This transition means that the only time the Mediterranean Games were not held four years after the previous games was in 1993, when Languedoc-Roussillon in France hosted the games just two years after Athens in 1991. In 2018, the Mediterranean Games calendar was reset again when Tarragona hosted the games in the mid-even year between the 2016 and 2020 Summer Olympic Games (and in the same year as the 2018 FIFA Men's World Cup).

== Description ==
The Mediterranean Games, in terms of the preparation and composition of the National Delegation, are held under the auspices of the International Olympic Committee and the Hellenic Olympic Committee (HOC).

Athens is the permanent seat of the ICMG (regardless of who the President might be) and the committee's General Secretary is Greek. This comes as a further tribute to Greece, highlighting its leading role with regard to the function and strengthening of the institution. Greece bailed out of its 2013 Mediterranean Games commitment due to financial troubles, when the two cities of Volos and Larissa were supposed to host the 2013 edition of the games. The 2013 honors went to Turkey, with the city of Mersin hosting the games instead.

== Participating countries ==
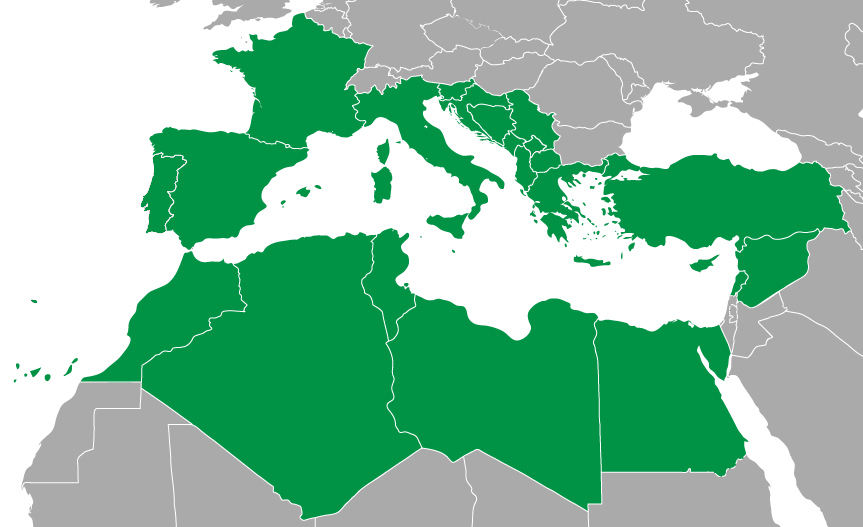
Participating countries

At present, 26 countries participate in the Mediterranean Games:

- Africa: Algeria, Egypt, Libya, Morocco and Tunisia
- Asia: Lebanon and Syria
- Europe: Albania, Andorra, Bosnia and Herzegovina, Croatia, Cyprus, France, Greece, Italy, Kosovo, Malta, Monaco, Montenegro, North Macedonia, Portugal, San Marino, Serbia, Slovenia, Spain and Turkey

Kosovo was accepted as a member of the International Committee of Mediterranean Games in October 2015 and participated for the first time in the 2018 Mediterranean Games in Tarragona, Spain. One athlete representing the Vatican City participated in an unofficial ("non-scoring") manner in the women's half marathon event at the 2022 Mediterranean Games in Oran, Algeria.

Of all the National Olympic Committees within the Olympic Movement bordering the Mediterranean Sea, Israel and Palestine have not participated in the Mediterranean Games, nor has Great Britain, which represents the British Overseas Territories of Gibraltar and Akrotiri and Dhekelia.

In the case of Israel, Allen Guttman in The Games Must Go On argued that Israel's exclusion is both antisemitic and politically motivated due to antagonism towards Israel by the participating Muslim and Arab nations. IOC President Avery Brundage was not supportive of Israel's desire to compete, saying: "I cannot understand why anyone wants to go where he is not wanted". The International Amateur Athletics Federation pushed the issue at the 1959 Mediterranean Games in Beirut by refusing to grant permission to hold an athletics competition unless Israel was allowed to compete. Lebanese games organizer Gabriel Gemayel conceded to this, but sidestepped the ruling by holding a parallel "Lebanese Games" comprising athletics events between the present nations alongside the official Mediterranean Games competitions. In September 2023, European Olympic Committees president Spyros Capralos called on the International Committee of Mediterranean Games to open a discussion about admitting both Israel and Palestine as members.

There are countries not bordering the Mediterranean Sea which nonetheless participate: Portugal, Andorra, Kosovo, San Marino, Serbia and North Macedonia. Serbia, Kosovo and North Macedonia were all formerly part of Yugoslavia, which competed until its breakup and dissolution in 1992.

The Hellenic Olympic Committee has suggested that nine more countries that do not satisfy the geographic criteria could be allowed to participate, such as Bulgaria and Jordan. Portugal competed in the 2018 Mediterranean Games after a decision which approved Portugal as an effective National Olympic Committee.

== Flag ==
Flag of the Mediterranean Games

The symbol of the Mediterranean Games consists of three rings representing Asia, Africa and Europe, the three continents involved in this competition. The rings dissolve in a wavy line in their lower part, as if they were immersed in the waters of the Mediterranean Sea. During the closing ceremony, the flag is transferred to the country of the city chosen to host the next edition of the Mediterranean Games.

== Editions ==
All host cities have been coastal and all but one on the Mediterranean coast (Casablanca is on the Atlantic coast). When Pristina hosts in 2030, it will be the first host city to not be coastal.

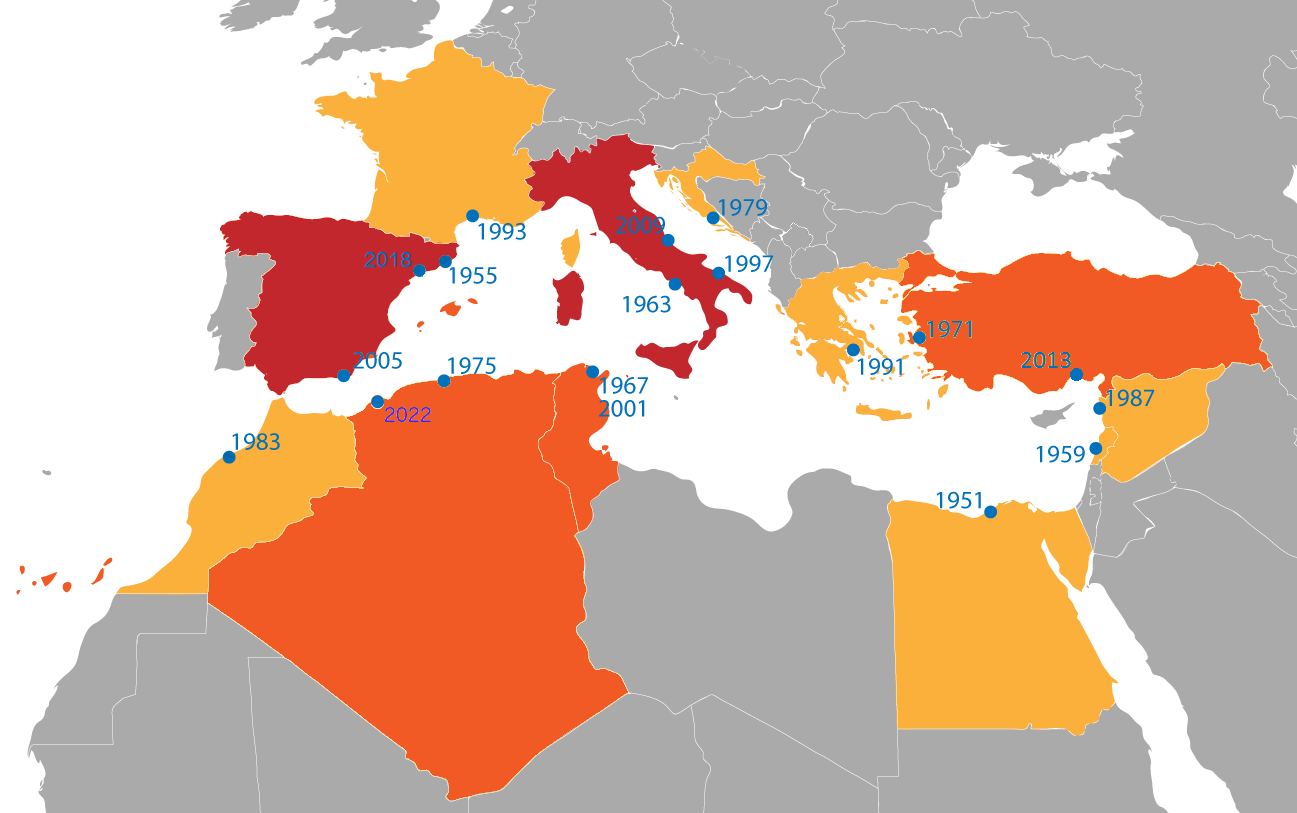
Cities that have hosted the Mediterranean Games

No	Year	Host City	Dates	Opened by	Nations	Competitors			Sports	Events	Top Country On Medal Table
No	Year	Host City	Dates	Opened by	Nations	Men	Women	Total	Sports	Events	Top Country On Medal Table
1	1951	(Egypt) Alexandria	5 – 20 October	Farouk I	10	734	—N/a	734	14	91	Italy
2	1955	(Spain) Barcelona	15 – 25 July	Francisco Franco	10	1,135	—N/a	1,135	20	102	France
3	1959	(Lebanon) Beirut	11 – 23 October	Fuad Chehab	11	792	—N/a	792	17	106	France
4	1963	(Italy) Naples	21 – 29 September	Antonio Segni	13	1,057	—N/a	1,057	17	93	Italy
5	1967	(Tunisia) Tunis	8 – 17 September	Habib Bourguiba	12	1,211	38	1,249	14	93	Italy
6	1971	(Turkey) İzmir	6 – 17 October	Cevdet Sunay	14	1,235	127	1,362	18	137	Italy
7	1975	(Algeria) Algiers	23 August – 6 September	Houari Boumédiène	15	2,095	349	2,444	19	160	Italy
8	1979	(Socialist Federal Republic of Yugoslavia) Split	15 – 29 September	Josip Broz Tito	14	2,009	399	2,408	26	192	(Socialist Federal Republic of Yugoslavia) Yugoslavia
9	1983	(Morocco) Casablanca	3 – 17 September	Hassan II	16	1,845	335	2,180	20	162	Italy
10	1987	(Syria) Latakia	11 – 25 September	Hafez al-Assad	18	1,529	467	1,996	19	162	Italy
11	1991	(Greece) Athens	28 June – 12 July	Konstantinos Karamanlis	18	2,176	586	2,762	24	217	Italy
12	1993	(France) Languedoc-Roussillon	16 – 27 June	François Mitterrand	19	1,994	604	2,598	24	217	France
13	1997	(Italy) Bari	13 – 25 June	Oscar Luigi Scalfaro	21	2,166	790	2,956	27	234	Italy
14	2001	(Tunisia) Tunis	2 – 15 September	Zine El Abidine Ben Ali	23	1,972	1,019	2,991	23	230	France
15	2005	(Spain) Almería	24 June - 3 July	Juan Carlos I	21	2,126	1,077	3,203	27	258	Italy
16	2009	(Italy) Pescara	25 June – 5 July	Renato Schifani	23	2,183	1,185	3,368	28	244	Italy
17	2013	(Turkey) Mersin	20 – 30 June	Recep Tayyip Erdoğan	24	1,994	1,070	3,064	27	264	Italy
18	2018	(Spain) Tarragona	22 June – 1 July	Felipe VI	26	2,180	1,468	3,648	28	246	Italy
19	2022	(Algeria) Oran	25 June – 6 July	Abdelmadjid Tebboune	26	2,014	1,284	3,298	24	244	Italy
20	2026	(Italy) Taranto	21 August – 3 September	Sergio Mattarella	26	2,207	1,647	3,854	28	279	Italy
21	2030	(Kosovo) Pristina	21 August – 3 September	President of Kosovo expected	Future event						

== All-time medal table ==
Medal Table 1951–2026

Rank	Team	Games	Gold	Silver	Bronze	Total
1	Italy	20	998	869	819	2687
2	France	20	677	621	611	1909
3	Turkey	20	427	297	357	1081
4	Spain	20	363	509	597	1469
5	Greece	20	226	283	368	806
6	Yugoslavia*	12	199	177	182	558
7	Egypt	18	179	225	274	620
8	Algeria	16	99	84	150	333
9	Tunisia	18	92	111	172	375
10	Morocco	18	88	99	135	322
11	Croatia	9	63	87	94	244
12	Serbia	6	61	61	78	200
13	Slovenia	9	58	68	111	237
14	Syria	18	32	42	80	154
15	United Arab Republic**	1	28	34	49	111
16	Cyprus	12	26	27	30	83
17	Portugal	3	26	25	30	81
18	Albania	11	13	20	21	54
19	Lebanon	19	11	23	42	76
20	Kosovo	4	8	4	7	19
21	San Marino	11	7	10	10	27
22	Bosnia and Herzegovina	9	7	8	30	45
23	Montenegro	5	5	11	13	29
24	North Macedonia	4	4	4	12	20
25	Libya	14	2	4	14	20
26	Malta	20	1	4	4	9
27	Monaco	16	1	4	1	6
28	Andorra	6	0	0	1	1
29	Jordan***	1	0	0	0	0
Total		20	3695	3696	4271	11662

– Yugoslavia competed in 1997 and 2001 as FR Yugoslavia.

– Serbia competed in 2005 as Serbia and Montenegro.

- (*) Yugoslavia participated in the Games before its breakup in 1992 and the establishment of the constituent republics.
- (**) The UAR included at the time Egypt and Syria.
- (***) Honorary participation in Tunis in 2001.

=== Doping ===
Changes by doping:

1. Nurcan Taylan – Weightlifting at the 2009 Mediterranean Games - 53 kg Women - 2 Gold
2. Gülcan Mıngır – Athletics at the 2013 Mediterranean Games – Results - 3000m Steeplechase Women – 1 Bronze

== Competitions ==
Throughout the history of the Mediterranean Games, 39 different sports have been presented:

Sport	Years
3x3 basketball	Since 2018
Archery	1979, 1993-1997, 2005, since 2018
Athletics	Since 1951
Badminton	Since 2013
Basketball	1951–2013
Beach volleyball	2005–2018
Boules	Since 1997
Boxing	Since 1951
Canoeing	1979–1997, 2005–2018, 2026
Cycling	Since 1955
Diving	1951–1997
Equestrian	1955–1959, 1979-1983, 1991-1997, 2005-2009, since 2018
Fencing	1951–1983, since 1991
Field hockey	1955, 1963, 1979
Finswimming	2026
Football	Since 1951
Golf	1983 (demonstration), 1991–2009, 2018
Gymnastics	Since 1951
Handball	1967, since 1975
Judo	Since 1971

Sport	Years
Karate	Since 1993
Padel	2026
Roller hockey	1955
Roller speed skating	2026
Rowing	1951–1979, 1991–2018, 2026
Rugby union	1955, 1979–1983, 1993
Sailing	1955–1963, 1971–1983, since 1991
Shooting	Since 1951
Skateboarding	2026
Swimming	Since 1951
Table tennis	Since 1971
Taekwondo	Since 2013
Tennis	Since 1963
Triathlon	2018, 2026
Volleyball	Since 1959
Water polo	Since 1951
Waterskiing	2009–2018
Weightlifting	Since 1951
Wrestling	Since 1951

== Mediterranean Sports Federations ==
19 Federations in 2018:

1. Confédération Méditerranéenne d'Escrime (COMES)
2. Confédération Méditerranéenne d'Haltérophilie (MWC)
3. Confédération Méditerranéenne de Handball (MHC)
4. Mediterranean Committee of Associated Wrestling Styles (CMLA)
5. Union Européenne et Méditerranéenne de Tir a l'arc (EMAU)
6. Confederation of Mediterranean Badminton (COMEBA)
7. Confédération Méditerranéenne de Wakeboard et Ski Nautique (MWWC)
8. Ligue Méditerranéenne de Football
9. Mediterranean Karate Federations Union
10. Union Méditerranéenne de Voile
11. Conféderation Méditerranéenne de Natation (C.O.ME.N.)
12. Union Méditerranéenne de Tennis de Table (UMTT)
13. Union méditerranéenne de Taekwondo
14. Confédération Méditerranéenne de Gymnastique
15. Fédération Méditerranéenne de WUSHU
16. Union de la Méditerranée des sports de Boules
17. Union Méditerranéenne d'Athlétisme
18. Union des Fédérations Méditerranéennes des Activités Subaquatiques
19. Confederation of Mediterranean Orienteering Federations (COMOF)

== See also ==
- Mediterranean Beach Games
