= Table tennis at the Mediterranean Games =

Table tennis is one of the sports at the quadrennial Mediterranean Games competition. It was introduced in 1979 and has recurred since 1987.

== Editions ==
Games	Year	Host	Men's singles			Men's doubles			Teams			Women's singles			Women's doubles			Teams			Mixed doubles		
Games	Year	Host	Gold	Silver	Bronze	Gold	Silver	Bronze	Gold	Silver	Bronze	Gold	Silver	Bronze	Gold	Silver	Bronze	Gold	Silver	Bronze	Gold	Silver	Bronze
VIII	1979	(Socialist Federal Republic of Yugoslavia) Split	YUG	FRA	YUG	FRA	YUG	YUG	YUG	FRA	TUR	YUG	YUG	YUG	YUG	FRA	YUG	FRA	YUG	GRE	FRA	YUG	YUG
X	1987	(Syria) Latakia	YUG	ITA	YUG	YUG	FRA	ITA				FRA	YUG	ESP	FRA	YUG	ITA				YUG	YUG	YUG
XI	1991	(Greece) Athens	FRA	GRE	YUG	YUG	TUR	ITA				YUG	FRA	YUG	YUG	FRA	ITA						
XII	1993	(France) Languedoc-Roussillon	FRA	CRO	FRA	FRA	CRO	ITA				ITA	ITA	FRA	ITA	CRO	FRA						
XIII	1997	(Italy) Bari	GRE	CRO	YUG	FRA	YUG	CRO				ITA	CRO	FRA	CRO	ITA	YUG						
XIV	2001	(Tunisia) Tunis	FRA	SLO	YUG	YUG	ESP	FRA				CRO	ITA	FRA	YUG	SLO	CRO						
XV	2005	(Spain) Almería	ITA	CRO	SCG	SCG	ESP	SLO				CRO	ITA	ITA	SCG	FRA	ITA						
XVI	2009	(Italy) Pescara	GRE	CRO	ESP	FRA	CRO	SRB				TUR	FRA	GRE	ITA	FRA	ESP						
XVII	2013	(Turkey) Mersin	EGY	TUR	TUR				TUR	ITA	ESP	TUR	ESP	ESP				ESP	FRA	EGY			
XVIII	2018	(Spain) Tarragona	SLO	ESP	TUR				SLO	FRA	POR	EGY	MON	ESP				ESP	TUR	FRA			
XIX	2022	(Algeria) Oran	ESP	EGY	POR				SLO	POR	GRE	MON	POR	ESP				EGY	ITA	POR			
XX	2026	(Italy) Taranto	ALG	EGY	FRA				ITA	EGY	ESP	EGY	MCO	SRB				EGY	ITA	SRB	TUR	EGY	ITA

== All-time medal table ==
Updated after the 2026 Mediterranean Games

Rank	Nation	Gold	Silver	Bronze	Total
1	Yugoslavia (YUG)	12	8	13	33
2	France (FRA)	11	11	12	34
3	Italy (ITA)	6	8	9	23
4	Egypt (EGY)	5	4	1	10
5	Turkey (TUR)	4	3	3	10
6	Croatia (CRO)	3	8	3	14
7	Spain (ESP)	3	4	8	15
8	Slovenia (SLO)	3	2	1	6
9	Greece (GRE)	2	1	4	7
10	Serbia and Montenegro (SCG)	2	0	1	3
11	Monaco (MON)	1	2	0	3
12	Algeria (ALG)	1	0	0	1
13	Portugal (POR)	0	2	3	5
14	Serbia (SRB)	0	0	3	3
Totals (14 entries)		53	53	61	167
