= Boxing at the 1979 Mediterranean Games =

Boxing competition

- Location: Split, Yugoslavia
- Dates: 15–29 September 1979

Boxing was one of the sports held at the 1979 Mediterranean Games.

== Medalists ==
Event	Gold	Silver	Bronze
Light Flyweight (–48 kg)	Fayek Adly Azed (EGY)	Roberto Alberti (ITA)	Selver Mustafi (YUG) Abdelkader Bouksiba (ALG)
Flyweight (–51 kg)	Lofti Belkhir (TUN)	Necmi Akkoyun (TUR)	Yehia Zakaria Mohamed (EGY) Elhani Bouksiba (ALG)
Bantamweight (–54 kg)	Fazlija Šaćirović (YUG)	Claude Capelle (FRA)	Faiçal Bejaoui (TUN) Bülent Angın (TUR)
Featherweight (–57 kg)	Daniel Londas (FRA)	Mahmoud Abdelrahman (EGY)	Giuseppe Ferracuti (ITA) Bratislav Ristić (YUG)
Lightweight (–60 kg)	Milivoje Labudović (YUG)	Carlo Russolillo (ITA)	Noureddine Segmani (MAR) Kamel Abboud (ALG)
Light Welterweight (–63.5 kg)	Ace Rusevski (YUG)	Djillali Rahou (ALG)	Mohamed Ghunainan (EGY) Patrizio Oliva (ITA)
Welterweight (–67 kg)	Mehmet Bogujevci (YUG)	Ali Abdelaziz Ismail (EGY)	Abdesat Bahri (TUN) Luciano Sorgon (ITA)
Light Middleweight (–71 kg)	Miodrag Perunović (YUG)	Santiago Bernal (ESP)	Ali Denouir Mohamed (TUN) Abdel Zaaher Ayyoub (EGY)
Middleweight (–75 kg)	Tadija Kačar (YUG)	Gaetano Ardito (ITA)	Brahim Manjoub (TUN) Selami Karakelle (TUR)
Light Heavyweight (–81 kg)	Slobodan Kačar (YUG)	Ahmed Ghunaim (EGY)	Taoufik Belbouli (TUN)
Heavyweight (+81 kg)	Dragan Vujković (YUG)	Dominique Nato (FRA)	Ali Öztürk (TUR) Francesco Damiani (ITA)

== Medal table ==
Rank	Nation	Gold	Silver	Bronze	Total
1	Yugoslavia (YUG)	8	0	2	10
2	Egypt (EGY)	1	3	3	7
3	France (FRA)	1	2	0	3
4	Tunisia (TUN)	1	0	5	6
5	Italy (ITA)	0	3	4	7
6	Algeria (ALG)	0	1	3	4
6	Turkey (TUR)	0	1	3	4
8	Spain (ESP)	0	1	0	1
9	Morocco (MAR)	0	0	1	1
Totals (9 entries)		11	11	21	43
