= Serbia and Montenegro at the Mediterranean Games =

- IOC code: SCG
- NOC: Olympic Committee of Serbia and Montenegro
- Medals: Gold 16 Silver 18 Bronze 41 Total 75

Mediterranean Games appearances (overview)
- 1997; 2001; 2005

Other related appearances
- Yugoslavia (1951–1991); Montenegro (2009–pres.); Serbia (2009–pres.); Kosovo (2018–pres.)

Serbia and Montenegro participated in three Mediterranean Games between 1997 and 2005. At the 1997 and 2001 Mediterranean Games, it participated under the name FR Yugoslavia. Before 1997, Serbian and Montenegrin athletes competed as part of the SFR Yugoslavia team. At the 2009 Games, Serbia and Montenegro competed as independent nations for the first time.

== Results by games ==
Games	Country	Rank	Gold	Silver	Bronze	Total
1997 Bari	Italy	9	5	4	13	22
2001 Tunisia	Tunisia	12	3	5	14	22
2005 Almeria	Spain	10	8	9	14	31
Total			16	18	41	75

=== Medals by sport ===
Sport	Gold	Silver	Bronze	Total
Shooting	4	4	3	11
Table tennis	4	1	4	9
Athletics	2	3	6	11
Wrestling	2	2	3	7
Karate	1	3	6	10
Judo	1	2	7	10
Boxing	1	1	5	7
Water polo	1	0	1	2
Handball	0	1	0	1
Rowing	0	1	0	1
Swimming	0	0	3	3
Basketball	0	0	1	1
Canoeing	0	0	1	1
Volleyball	0	0	1	1
Totals (14 entries)	16	18	41	75

== See also ==
- Serbia and Montenegro at the Olympics
