= Weightlifting at the Mediterranean Games =

Weightlifting is one of the sports at the quadrennial Mediterranean Games competition. It has been a sport in the program of the Mediterranean Games since its inception in 1951.

== Editions ==
Games	Year	Host	Winner of the medal table	Second in the medal table	Third in the medal table
I	1951	(Egypt) Alexandria	Egypt	France	Italy
II	1955	(Spain) Barcelona	Egypt	Italy	France
III	1959	(Lebanon) Beirut	United Arab Republic	France	Spain
V	1967	(Tunisia) Tunis	France	Italy	Greece
VI	1971	(Turkey) İzmir	Italy	Egypt	France
VII	1975	(Algeria) Algiers	France	Greece	Egypt
VIII	1979	(Socialist Federal Republic of Yugoslavia) Split	France	Greece	Egypt
IX	1983	(Morocco) Casablanca	Greece	France	Italy
X	1987	(Syria) Latakia	Italy	Spain	Greece
XI	1991	(Greece) Athens	Turkey	Egypt	Italy
XII	1993	(France) Languedoc-Roussillon	Turkey	Greece	Egypt
XIII	1997	(Italy) Bari	Turkey	Greece	Egypt
XIV	2001	(Tunisia) Tunis	Turkey	Greece	Tunisia
XV	2005	(Spain) Almería	Turkey	Egypt	Spain
XVI	2009	(Italy) Pescara	Turkey	Egypt	France
XVII	2013	(Turkey) Mersin	Egypt	Turkey	Tunisia
XVIII	2018	(Spain) Tarragona	Egypt	Turkey	Italy
XIX	2022	(Algeria) Oran	Italy	Tunisia	Egypt
XX	2026	(Italy) Taranto	Egypt	Italy	Turkey

== All-time medal table ==
Updated after the 2026 Mediterranean Games

Rank	Nation	Gold	Silver	Bronze	Total
1	Turkey (TUR)	68	46	36	150
2	Egypt (EGY)	60	56	55	171
3	Greece (GRE)	37	33	23	93
4	Italy (ITA)	36	35	32	103
5	France (FRA)	28	29	36	93
6	Spain (ESP)	19	32	32	83
7	Tunisia (TUN)	17	18	22	57
8	Albania (ALB)	6	11	12	29
9	Lebanon (LIB)	6	9	10	25
10	Syria (SYR)	6	8	15	29
11	Algeria (ALG)	5	8	9	22
12	United Arab Republic (UAR)	5	1	1	7
13	Yugoslavia (YUG)	1	5	5	11
14	Libya (LBA)	1	2	2	5
15	Croatia (CRO)	1	0	0	1
16	Cyprus (CYP)	0	2	1	3
17	Kosovo (KOS)	0	2	0	2
18	Morocco (MAR)	0	0	1	1
Totals (18 entries)		296	297	292	885
