= Josip Despot =

Croatian rower

Personal information
- Nationality: Croatian
- Born: 8 July 1953; Šibenik, Yugoslavia
- Died: 21 August 2017 (aged 64); Šibenik, Croatia

Sport
- Sport: Rowing

Josip Despot (8 July 1953 – 21 August 2017) was a Croatian rower. He competed in the men's eight event at the 1972 Summer Olympics.
