= Dušan Mirković =

Yugoslav weightlifter (1953–2023)

Personal information
- Nationality: Yugoslav
- Born: 12 April 1953; Bač, Serbia
- Died: 8 March 2023 (aged 69); Sombor

Sport
- Sport: Weightlifting

Dušan Mirković (12 April 1953 – March 2023) was a Yugoslav weightlifter. He competed in the men's middleweight event at the 1980 Summer Olympics.
