= Vladimir Zrnić =

Yugoslav weightlifter

Personal information
- Nationality: Yugoslav
- Born: 16 September 1953 (age 71)

Sport
- Sport: Weightlifting

Vladimir Zrnić (born 16 September 1953) is a Yugoslav weightlifter. He competed in the men's light heavyweight event at the 1980 Summer Olympics.
