= Zdravko Huljev =

Croatian rower

Personal information
- Nationality: Croatian
- Born: 17 March 1953 (age 72); Šibenik, Yugoslavia

Sport
- Sport: Rowing

Zdravko Huljev (born 17 March 1953) is a Croatian rower. He competed in the men's eight event at the 1972 Summer Olympics.
