= Zdravko Milutinović =

Yugoslav sports shooter

Personal information
- Born: 29 March 1951 (age 75)

Sport
- Sport: Sports shooting

Zdravko Milutinović (born 29 March 1951) is a Yugoslav former sports shooter. He competed at the 1972, 1976 and the 1980 Summer Olympics.
