= Janez Grbelja =

Croatian rower

Personal information
- Nationality: Croatian
- Born: 2 December 1948 (age 76); Šibenik, Yugoslavia

Sport
- Sport: Rowing

Janez Grbelja (born 2 December 1948) is a Croatian rower. He competed for Yugoslavia in the men's eight event at the 1972 Summer Olympics.
