= Spain at the 1951 Mediterranean Games =

- IOC code: ESP
- NOC: Spanish Olympic Committee

in Alexandria, Egypt
- Competitors: 36
- Medals Ranked 7th: Gold 2 Silver 4 Bronze 4 Total 10

Mediterranean Games appearances (overview)
- 1951; 1955; 1959; 1963; 1967; 1971; 1975; 1979; 1983; 1987; 1991; 1993; 1997; 2001; 2005; 2009; 2013; 2018; 2022

Spain competed at the 1951 Mediterranean Games in Alexandria, Egypt.

== Medals ==
Sport	Gold	Silver	Bronze	Total
Shooting	1	1	1	3
Water polo	1	0	0	1
Swimming	0	2	3	5
Basketball	0	1	0	1
Totals (4 entries)	2	4	4	10
