= Bruno Bulić =

Yugoslav cyclist (born 1958)

Personal information
- Born: 6 March 1958 (age 68) Pula, Yugoslavia

Cycling career
- Sport: Cycling

Bruno Bulić (born 6 March 1958) is a Yugoslav former cyclist. He competed at the 1980 Summer Olympics and the 1984 Summer Olympics.
