= Swimming at the Mediterranean Games =

Swimming is one of the sports at the quadrennial Mediterranean Games competition, a regional multi-sports event open to athletes from countries located around the Mediterranean Sea. It has been one of the sports featured in every event since the inaugural edition in 1951.

== Editions ==
Games	Year	Host city	Host country	Swimming events			Top medallists
Games	Year	Host city	Host country	M	F	X	Top medallists
I	1951	Alexandria	Egypt	7	—	—	France
II	1955	Barcelona	Spain	8	—	—	France
III	1959	Beirut	Lebanon	8	—	—	Italy
IV	1963	Naples	Italy	8	—	—	Italy
V	1967	Tunis	Tunisia	8	3	—	Spain
VI	1971	İzmir	Turkey	15	7	—	Italy
VII	1975	Algiers	Algeria	15	6	—	Italy
VIII	1979	Split	Yugoslavia	13	13	—	Italy
IX	1983	Casablanca	Morocco	15	14	—	Italy
X	1987	Latakia	Syria	15	14	—	Italy
XI	1991	Athens	Greece	16	15	—	France
XII	1993	Mende, Lozère	France	16	15	—	France
XIII	1997	Bari	Italy	17	16	—	Italy
XIV	2001	Tunis	Tunisia	16	16	—	Spain
XV	2005	Almería	Spain	20	20	—	France
XVI	2009	Pescara	Italy	19	19	—	Italy
XVII	2013	Mersin	Turkey	19	19	—	Italy
XVIII	2018	Tarragona	Spain	19	19	—	Italy
XIX	2022	Oran	Algeria	19	19	—	Italy
XX	2026	Taranto	Italy	17	17	1	Italy

== Events ==
As of the most recent 2026 edition, the swimming program features 17 men's and 17 women's events and for the first time the mixed event. Three men's events have been held every time since the inaugural 1951 edition (100 m freestyle, 400 m freestyle and 200 m breaststroke).

In the first four editions from 1951 to 1963 the swimming program only featured men's events. The program was expanded to include women for the 1967 edition, with only three events initially available to them (100 m freestyle, 100 m backstroke, 100 m breaststroke). New events were gradually added over the decades so that full parity was achieved by 2001.

=== Men's events ===
Event	51	55	59	63	67	71	75	79	83	87	91	93	97	01	05	09	13	18	22	26	Games
Freestyle
50 m											X	X	X	X	X	X	X	X	X	X	10
100 m	X	X	X	X	X	X	X	X	X	X	X	X	X	X	X	X	X	X	X	X	20
200 m						X	X	X	X	X	X	X	X	X	X	X	X	X	X	X	14
400 m	X	X	X	X	X	X	X	X	X	X	X	X	X	X	X	X	X	X	X	X	20
800 m															X					X	2
1500 m	X	X	X	X		X	X	X	X	X	X	X	X	X	X	X	X	X	X	X	18
4×100 m						X	X		X	X	X	X	X	X	X	X	X	X	X		13
4×200 m	X	X	X	X	X	X	X	X	X	X	X	X	X	X	X	X	X	X	X		19
Backstroke
50 m															X	X	X	X	X	X	6
100 m	X	X	X		X	X	X	X	X	X	X	X	X	X	X	X	X	X	X	X	19
200 m				X		X	X	X	X	X	X	X	X	X	X	X	X	X	X	X	16
Breaststroke
50 m															X	X	X	X	X	X	6
100 m					X	X	X	X	X	X	X	X	X	X	X	X	X	X	X	X	16
200 m	X	X	X	X	X	X	X	X	X	X	X	X	X	X	X	X	X	X	X	X	20
Butterfly
50 m															X	X	X	X	X	X	6
100 m					X	X	X	X	X	X	X	X	X	X	X	X	X	X	X	X	16
200 m		X	X	X		X	X	X	X	X	X	X	X	X	X	X	X	X	X	X	18
Individual medley
200 m						X	X		X	X	X	X	X	X	X	X	X	X	X	X	14
400 m						X	X	X	X	X	X	X	X	X	X	X	X	X	X	X	15
4×100 m		X	X	X	X	X	X	X	X	X	X	X	X	X	X	X	X	X	X		18
3×100 m	X																				1
Open Water
15 km													X								1
Events	7	8	8	8	8	15	15	13	15	15	16	16	17	16	20	19	19	19	19	17	

=== Women's events ===
Event	67	71	75	79	83	87	91	93	97	01	05	09	13	18	22	26	Games
Freestyle
50 m							X	X	X	X	X	X	X	X	X	X	10
100 m	X	X	X	X	X	X	X	X	X	X	X	X	X	X	X	X	16
200 m				X	X	X	X	X	X	X	X	X	X	X	X	X	13
400 m		X	X	X	X	X	X	X	X	X	X	X	X	X	X	X	15
800 m				X	X	X	X	X	X	X	X	X	X	X	X	X	13
1500 m											X					X	2
4×100 m		X	X	X	X	X	X	X	X	X	X	X	X	X	X		14
4×200 m										X	X	X	X	X	X		6
Backstroke
50 m											X	X	X	X	X	X	6
100 m	X	X	X	X	X	X	X	X	X	X	X	X	X	X	X	X	16
200 m				X	X	X	X	X	X	X	X	X	X	X	X	X	13
Breaststroke
50 m											X	X	X	X	X	X	6
100 m	X	X	X	X	X	X	X	X	X	X	X	X	X	X	X	X	16
200 m				X	X	X	X	X	X	X	X	X	X	X	X	X	13
Butterfly
50 m											X	X	X	X	X	X	6
100 m		X	X	X	X	X	X	X	X	X	X	X	X	X	X	X	15
200 m				X	X	X	X	X	X	X	X	X	X	X	X	X	13
Individual medley
200 m		X			X	X	X	X	X	X	X	X	X	X	X	X	13
400 m				X	X	X	X	X	X	X	X	X	X	X	X	X	13
4×100 m				X	X	X	X	X	X	X	X	X	X	X	X		12
Open Water
15 km									X								1
Events	3	7	6	13	14	14	15	15	16	16	20	19	19	19	19	17	

=== Mixed events ===
Event	26	Games
Mixed medley
4x100 m	X	1
Events	1	

== All-time medal table ==
Updated after the 2026 Mediterranean Games

Rank	Nation	Gold	Silver	Bronze	Total
1	Italy (ITA)	235	188	153	576
2	France (FRA)	116	96	74	286
3	Spain (ESP)	65	115	126	306
4	Greece (GRE)	28	42	53	123
5	Serbia (SRB)	21	21	25	67
6	Slovenia (SLO)	14	20	15	49
7	Tunisia (TUN)	12	7	9	28
8	Turkey (TUR)	8	13	30	51
9	Algeria (ALG)	7	3	6	16
10	Croatia (CRO)	6	11	12	29
11	Egypt (EGY)	6	7	12	25
12	Portugal (POR)	6	6	8	20
13	Cyprus (CYP)	4	2	4	10
14	Bosnia and Herzegovina (BIH)	2	0	0	2
15	Syria (SYR)	1	0	0	1
Totals (15 entries)		531	531	527	1,589
