= Basketball at the Mediterranean Games =

Mediterranean games (basketball)

Basketball at the Mediterranean Games has been played consistently since 1951 for men, and 1987 for women. The Yugoslavia national team, which disbanded in 1992, was the most successful men's team, while the Croatia women's national team has been the most successful in the women's competition. Since 2018, the Mediterranean Games has exclusively featured 3x3 basketball.

== Men's tournaments ==
| Year | Host | Gold medal game | | | Bronze medal game (or third place) | | |
| Year | Host | Gold medalist | Score | Silver medalist | Bronze medalist | Score | Fourth place |
|---|---|---|---|---|---|---|---|
| 1951; Details | (Egypt); Alexandria | Egypt | | Spain | Italy | | Greece |
| 1955; Details | (Spain); Barcelona | Spain | ^{n/a} | Italy | Greece | ^{n/a} | Egypt |
| 1959; Details | (Lebanon); Beirut | Yugoslavia | ^{n/a} | Spain | United Arab Republic | | Lebanon |
| 1963; Details | (Italy); Naples | Italy | ^{n/a} | Spain | Yugoslavia | | United Arab Republic |
| 1967; Details | (Tunisia); Tunis | Yugoslavia | 85 – 76 | Italy | Turkey | 87 – 84 | Greece |
| 1971; Details | (Turkey); İzmir | Yugoslavia | | Turkey | Greece | | United Arab Republic |
| 1975; Details | (Algeria); Algiers | Yugoslavia | | France | Italy | | Spain |
| 1979; Details | (Socialist Federal Republic of Yugoslavia); Split | Greece | 85 – 74 | Yugoslavia | Egypt | | Turkey |
| 1983; Details | (Morocco); Casablanca | Yugoslavia | | Italy | Turkey | 77 – 73 | Greece |
| 1987; Details | (Syria); Latakia | Turkey | | Spain | Greece | | Tunisia |
| 1991; Details | (Greece); Athens | Italy | 97 − 91 | Greece | France | 63 − 59 | Turkey |
| 1993; Details | (France); Languedoc-Roussillon | Italy | 77 − 74 | Croatia | France | 70 − 67 | Greece |
| 1997; Details | (Italy); Bari | Spain | 82 − 72 | Italy | FR Yugoslavia | 84 − 75 | Greece |
| 2001; Details | (Tunisia); Tunis | Spain | 72 − 61 | Greece | Italy | | FR Yugoslavia |
| 2005; Details | (Spain); Almería | Italy | 87 − 86 | Greece | Spain | 84 − 70 | Turkey |
| 2009; Details | (Italy); Pescara | Croatia | 72 − 60 | Greece | Turkey | 88 − 71 | Italy |
| 2013; Details | (Turkey); Mersin | Turkey | 79 − 62 | Serbia | Tunisia | 63 − 58 | Macedonia |

=== Men's medal table ===
| Rank | Nation | Gold | Silver | Bronze | Total |
|---|---|---|---|---|---|
| 1 | Yugoslavia | 5 | 1 | 1 | 7 |
| 2 | Italy | 4 | 4 | 3 | 11 |
| 3 | Spain | 3 | 4 | 1 | 8 |
| 4 | Turkey | 2 | 1 | 3 | 6 |
| 5 | Greece | 1 | 4 | 3 | 8 |
| 6 | Croatia | 1 | 1 | 0 | 2 |
| 7 | Egypt | 1 | 0 | 2 | 3 |
| 8 | France | 0 | 1 | 2 | 3 |
| 9 | Serbia | 0 | 1 | 0 | 1 |
| 10 | (Federal Republic of Yugoslavia) FR Yugoslavia | 0 | 0 | 1 | 1 |
| 10 | Tunisia | 0 | 0 | 1 | 1 |
| Totals (11 entries) | | 17 | 17 | 17 | 51 |

== Women's tournaments ==
| Year | Host | Gold medal game | | | Bronze medal game | | |
| Year | Host | Gold medalist | Score | Silver medalist | Bronze medalist | Score | Fourth place |
|---|---|---|---|---|---|---|---|
| 1987; Details | (Syria); Latakia | Albania | 88– 52 | Turkey | Syria | | Lebanon |
| 1991; Details | (Greece); Athens | Spain | | France | Greece | 66 – 61 | Italy |
| 1993; Details | (France); Languedoc-Roussillon | Bosnia and Herzegovina | | Italy | Spain | | Slovenia |
| 1997; Details | (Italy); Bari | Croatia | 74 − 69 | Turkey | France | 85 – 63 | Greece |
| 2001; Details | (Tunisia); Tunis | Croatia | 71 – 62 | Italy | Spain | 72 – 71 | Turkey |
| 2005; Details | (Spain); Almería | Turkey | 68 – 66 | Croatia | Spain | 68 – 51 | Greece |
| 2009; Details | (Italy); Pescara | Italy | 70 – 54 | Serbia | Croatia | 77 – 62 | Greece |
| 2013; Details | (Turkey); Mersin | Cancelled | | | Cancelled | | |

=== Women's medal table ===
| Rank | Nation | Gold | Silver | Bronze | Total |
|---|---|---|---|---|---|
| 1 | Croatia | 2 | 1 | 1 | 4 |
| 2 | Italy | 1 | 2 | 0 | 3 |
| 2 | Turkey | 1 | 2 | 0 | 3 |
| 4 | Spain | 1 | 0 | 3 | 4 |
| 5 | Albania | 1 | 0 | 0 | 1 |
| 5 | Bosnia and Herzegovina | 1 | 0 | 0 | 1 |
| 7 | France | 0 | 1 | 1 | 2 |
| 8 | Serbia | 0 | 1 | 0 | 1 |
| 9 | Greece | 0 | 0 | 1 | 1 |
| 9 | Syria | 0 | 0 | 1 | 1 |
| Totals (10 entries) | | 7 | 7 | 7 | 21 |

== All-time medal table ==
Updated with 2013 results.

| Rank | Nation | Gold | Silver | Bronze | Total |
|---|---|---|---|---|---|
| 1 | Italy | 5 | 6 | 3 | 14 |
| 2 | Yugoslavia | 5 | 1 | 1 | 7 |
| 3 | Spain | 4 | 4 | 4 | 12 |
| 4 | Turkey | 3 | 3 | 3 | 9 |
| 5 | Croatia | 3 | 2 | 1 | 6 |
| 6 | Greece | 1 | 4 | 4 | 9 |
| 7 | Egypt | 1 | 0 | 2 | 3 |
| 8 | Albania | 1 | 0 | 0 | 1 |
| 8 | Bosnia and Herzegovina | 1 | 0 | 0 | 1 |
| 10 | France | 0 | 2 | 3 | 5 |
| 11 | Serbia | 0 | 2 | 0 | 2 |
| 12 | (Federal Republic of Yugoslavia) FR Yugoslavia | 0 | 0 | 1 | 1 |
| 12 | Syria | 0 | 0 | 1 | 1 |
| 12 | Tunisia | 0 | 0 | 1 | 1 |
| Totals (14 entries) | | 24 | 24 | 24 | 72 |

== See also ==
- 3x3 basketball at the Mediterranean Games
- Basketball at the Summer Olympics
- Basketball at the Summer Universiade
- Basketball at the Pan American Games
