= Serbia at the Mediterranean Games =

- IOC code: SRB
- NOC: Olympic Committee of Serbia
- Medals: Gold 61 Silver 61 Bronze 77 Total 199

Mediterranean Games appearances (overview)
- 2009; 2013; 2018; 2022; 2026

Other related appearances
- Yugoslavia (1951–1991); Serbia and Montenegro (1997–2005); Kosovo (2018–pres.)

Serbia participated at 2009 Mediterranean Games, under this name after the separation of Serbia and Montenegro. CIJM counts 2005 Games as Serbia's first games. As of 2026, Serbian athletes have won a total of 199 medals under their flag.

== Results by games ==
| Games | Rank | Gold | Silver | Bronze | Total |
|---|---|---|---|---|---|
| (Spain) 2005 Almeria | 10 | 8 | 9 | 14 | 31 |
| (Italy) 2009 Pescara | 8 | 9 | 13 | 13 | 35 |
| (Turkey) 2013 Mersin | 8 | 12 | 11 | 11 | 34 |
| (Spain) 2018 Tarragona | 7 | 12 | 11 | 9 | 32 |
| (Algeria) 2022 Oran | 7 | 13 | 7 | 11 | 31 |
| (Italy) 2026 Taranto | 10 | 7 | 10 | 19 | 36 |
| (Kosovo) 2030 Pristina | Future events | | | | |
| Total | | 61 | 61 | 77 | 199 |

== Medals by sport ==
| Sport | Gold | Silver | Bronze | Total |
|---|---|---|---|---|
| Shooting | 14 | 13 | 10 | 37 |
| Swimming | 11 | 7 | 2 | 20 |
| Athletics | 7 | 7 | 5 | 19 |
| Judo | 6 | 7 | 7 | 20 |
| Wrestling | 6 | 5 | 9 | 20 |
| Canoeing | 3 | 4 | 7 | 14 |
| Water polo | 3 | 0 | 2 | 5 |
| Rowing | 2 | 5 | 1 | 8 |
| Karate | 2 | 3 | 3 | 8 |
| Handball | 2 | 1 | 2 | 5 |
| Table tennis | 2 | 0 | 4 | 6 |
| Boxing | 1 | 4 | 11 | 16 |
| Taekwondo | 1 | 2 | 5 | 8 |
| Fencing | 1 | 0 | 1 | 2 |
| Basketball | 0 | 3 | 0 | 3 |
| Volleyball | 0 | 0 | 3 | 3 |
| Badminton | 0 | 0 | 2 | 2 |
| Boules | 0 | 0 | 2 | 2 |
| Cycling | 0 | 0 | 1 | 1 |
| Totals (19 entries) | 61 | 61 | 77 | 199 |

== See also ==
- Serbia at the Olympics
- Serbia at the Paralympics
- Sport in Serbia
