= Croatia at the Mediterranean Games =

- IOC code: CRO
- NOC: Croatian Olympic Committee
- Medals Ranked 11th: Gold 63 Silver 87 Bronze 94 Total 244

Mediterranean Games appearances (overview)
- 1993; 1997; 2001; 2005; 2009; 2013; 2018; 2022; 2026

Other related appearances
- Yugoslavia (1951–1991)

Croatia has competed at every celebration of the Mediterranean Games since the XII Games held 1993 in Languedoc-Roussillon. As of 2026, Croatian athletes have won a total of 244 medals.

Before Croatian independence in 1991, Croatian athletes competed for SFR Yugoslavia (1951-1991).

== Medal count ==
| Games | Athletes | Gold | Silver | Bronze | Total | Rank |
| (France) 1993 Languedoc-Roussillon | 93 | 9 | 6 | 19 | 34 | 6 |
| (Italy) 1997 Bari | 239 | 6 | 16 | 10 | 32 | 6 |
| (Tunisia) 2001 Tunis | 138 | 6 | 6 | 6 | 18 | 9 |
| (Spain) 2005 Almería | 201 | 5 | 10 | 11 | 26 | 11 |
| (Italy) 2009 Pescara | 164 | 5 | 12 | 11 | 28 | 11 |
| (Turkey) 2013 Mersin | 100 | 11 | 7 | 9 | 27 | 9 |
| (Spain) 2018 Tarragona | 99 | 9 | 5 | 3 | 17 | 9 |
| (Algeria) 2022 Oran | 105 | 6 | 7 | 10 | 23 | 12 |
| (Italy) 2026 Taranto | 111 | 6 | 18 | 15 | 39 | 12 |
| Total | | 63 | 87 | 94 | 244 | 11 |

== Multiple medal winners ==
The following list only contains medal winners for Croatia as an independent country.

| Athlete | Sex | Sport | Years | Gold | Silver | Bronze | Total |
|---|---|---|---|---|---|---|---|
| Tamara Boroš | F | Table tennis | 1997–2005 | 3 | 1 | 0 | 4 |
| Stjepan Janić | M | Canoeing | 2005–2009 | 2 | 1 | 1 | 4 |
| Katarina Maloča | F | Basketball | 1997–2005 | 2 | 1 | 0 | 3 |
| Emilija Podrug | F | Basketball | 1997–2005 | 2 | 1 | 0 | 3 |
| Vanda Baranović | F | Basketball | 1997–2001 | 2 | 0 | 0 | 2 |
| Davor Dominiković | M | Handball | 1997–2001 | 2 | 0 | 0 | 2 |
| Amra Đapo | F | Basketball | 1997–2001 | 2 | 0 | 0 | 2 |
| Mirza Džomba | M | Handball | 1997–2001 | 2 | 0 | 0 | 2 |
| Jasminka Francki | F | Shooting | 1993 | 2 | 0 | 0 | 2 |
| Slavko Goluža | M | Handball | 1993–2001 | 2 | 0 | 0 | 2 |
| Matea Jelić | F | Taekwondo | 2018–2022 | 2 | 0 | 0 | 2 |
| Božidar Jović | M | Handball | 1997–2001 | 2 | 0 | 0 | 2 |
| Mario Kelentrić | M | Handball | 1997–2001 | 2 | 0 | 0 | 2 |
| Igor Kos | M | Handball | 1997–2001 | 2 | 0 | 0 | 2 |
| Valter Matošević | M | Handball | 1997–2001 | 2 | 0 | 0 | 2 |
| Maja Murić | F | Tennis | 1993 | 2 | 0 | 0 | 2 |
| Goran Perkovac | M | Handball | 1993–1997 | 2 | 0 | 0 | 2 |
| Sandra Perković | F | Athletics | 2013–2018 | 2 | 0 | 0 | 2 |
| Slavica Pretreger | F | Basketball | 1997–2001 | 2 | 0 | 0 | 2 |
| Sanja Jovanović | F | Swimming | 2001–2013 | 1 | 2 | 3 | 6 |
| Miloš Milošević | M | Swimming | 1993–2001 | 1 | 2 | 0 | 3 |
| Marko Strahija | M | Swimming | 1997–2001 | 1 | 2 | 0 | 3 |
| Indira Botica | F | Handball | 1993–1997 | 1 | 1 | 0 | 2 |
| Klaudija Bubalo | F | Handball | 1993–1997 | 1 | 1 | 0 | 2 |
| Božena Erceg | F | Basketball | 2001–2005 | 1 | 1 | 0 | 2 |
| Šime Fantela | M | Sailing | 2009–2013 | 1 | 1 | 0 | 2 |
| Anđelo Kvesić | M | Karate | 2022–2026 | 1 | 1 | 0 | 2 |
| Igor Marenić | M | Sailing | 2009–2013 | 1 | 1 | 0 | 2 |
| Jasenka Marohnić | F | Basketball | 2001–2005 | 1 | 1 | 0 | 2 |
| Tina Mihelić | F | Sailing | 2009–2013 | 1 | 1 | 0 | 2 |
| Snježana Petika | F | Handball | 1993–1997 | 1 | 1 | 0 | 2 |
| Ana Viktorija Puljiz | F | Judo | 2022–2026 | 1 | 1 | 0 | 2 |
| Vanja Rogulj | M | Swimming | 2001 | 1 | 1 | 0 | 2 |
| Ivan Šapina | M | Swimming | 2022–2026 | 1 | 1 | 0 | 2 |
| Vanja Rogulj | M | Swimming | 2001 | 1 | 1 | 0 | 2 |
| Suzana Skoko | F | Shooting | 1993–1997 | 1 | 1 | 0 | 2 |
| Tonči Stipanović | M | Sailing | 2009–2013 | 1 | 1 | 0 | 2 |
| Marko Banović | M | Rowing | 1993–1997 | 1 | 0 | 1 | 2 |
| Bernarda Brčić | F | Volleyball | 2013–2018 | 1 | 0 | 1 | 2 |
| Samanta Fabris | F | Volleyball | 2013–2018 | 1 | 0 | 1 | 2 |
| Sanja Popović | F | Volleyball | 2009–2018 | 1 | 0 | 1 | 2 |
| Mirna Rajle | F | Rowing | 2005–2009 | 1 | 0 | 1 | 2 |
| Nenad Žugaj | M | Wrestling | 2009–2013 | 1 | 0 | 1 | 2 |
| Zoran Primorac | M | Table tennis | 1993–1997 | 0 | 3 | 1 | 4 |
| Andrej Gaćina | M | Table tennis | 2009 | 0 | 2 | 0 | 2 |
| Ana Juginović | F | Boules | 2026 | 0 | 2 | 0 | 2 |
| Vjekoslav Kobešćak | M | Water polo | 1993–1997 | 0 | 2 | 0 | 2 |
| Gordan Kožulj | M | Swimming | 1997–2005 | 0 | 2 | 0 | 2 |
| Ognjen Kržić | M | Water polo | 1993–1997 | 0 | 2 | 0 | 2 |
| Miran Maričić | M | Shooting | 2022–2026 | 0 | 2 | 0 | 2 |
| Robert Seligman | M | Gymnastics | 2013–2018 | 0 | 2 | 0 | 2 |
| Roko Tošić | M | Table tennis | 2005–2009 | 0 | 2 | 0 | 2 |
| Luka Zure | M | Boules | 2026 | 0 | 2 | 0 | 2 |
| Vera Begić | F | Athletics | 2005–2009 | 0 | 1 | 1 | 2 |
| Igor Boraska | M | Rowing | 1993–1997 | 0 | 1 | 1 | 2 |
| Krešimir Čač | M | Swimming | 1997 | 0 | 1 | 1 | 2 |
| Marta Čakić | F | Basketball | 2005–2009 | 0 | 1 | 1 | 2 |
| Tihomir Franković | M | Rowing | 1993–1997 | 0 | 1 | 1 | 2 |
| Jelena Ivezić | F | Basketball | 2005–2009 | 0 | 1 | 1 | 2 |
| Anđa Jelavić | F | Basketball | 2005–2009 | 0 | 1 | 1 | 2 |
| Mirna Mazić | F | Basketball | 2005–2009 | 0 | 1 | 1 | 2 |
| Matea Mezak | F | Tennis | 2005 | 0 | 1 | 1 | 2 |
| Marino Miličević | M | Boules | 2022–2026 | 0 | 1 | 1 | 2 |
| Ivan Mladina | M | Swimming | 2001 | 0 | 1 | 1 | 2 |
| Mirela Šikoronja | F | Table tennis | 1993 | 0 | 1 | 1 | 2 |
| Saša Špirelja | M | Shooting | 1993–1997 | 0 | 1 | 1 | 2 |
| Neven Žugaj | M | Wrestling | 2009–2013 | 0 | 1 | 1 | 2 |
| Dorotea Bralić | F | Swimming | 1993 | 0 | 0 | 2 | 2 |
| Jurica Grabušić | M | Athletics | 2005–2009 | 0 | 0 | 2 | 2 |
| Mladenka Malenica | F | Shooting | 1997 | 0 | 0 | 2 | 2 |
| Iva Oberan | F | Judo | 2022–2026 | 0 | 0 | 2 | 2 |

== List of flag bearers ==
| # | Event year | Flag bearer | Sport |
|---|---|---|---|
| 9 | 2026 | Nives Jelovica Ivan Šapina | Boules Taekwondo |
| 8 | 2022 | Lucija Lesjak Tin Srbić | Karate Gymnastics |
| 7 | 2018 | Josip Glasnović | Shooting |
| 6 | 2013 | Giovanni Cernogoraz | Shooting |
| 5 | 2009 | Filip Ude | Gymnastics |
| 4 | 2005 | Drago Vuković | Handball |
| 3 | 2001 | Miloš Milošević | Swimming |
| 2 | 1997 | | |
| 1 | 1993 | Deni Lušić | Water polo |

== See also ==
- Croatia at the Olympics
- Croatia at the Paralympics
