= Slovenia at the Mediterranean Games =

- IOC code: SLO
- NOC: Olympic Committee of Slovenia
- Medals Ranked 13th: Gold 58 Silver 68 Bronze 111 Total 237

Mediterranean Games appearances (overview)
- 1993; 1997; 2001; 2005; 2009; 2013; 2018; 2022; 2026

Other related appearances
- Yugoslavia (1951–1991)

Slovenia has sent athletes to every edition of the quadrennial Mediterranean Games since the nation's first appearance at the 1993 Mediterranean Games following its independence from Yugoslavia. As of 2026, Slovenian athletes have won a total of 237 medals.

== Overview ==
=== By event ===
Games	Athletes	Gold	Silver	Bronze	Total	Rank
1951–1991	Competed as part of Yugoslavia					
1993 Languedoc-Roussillon	149	5	6	8	19	9th
1997 Bari	168	5	8	10	23	8th
2001 Tunis	133	5	5	10	20	11th
2005 Almería	159	10	8	17	35	8th
2009 Pescara	135	7	9	10	26	9th
2013 Mersin		13	13	11	35	7th
2018 Tarragona	174	4	9	23	36	11th
2022 Oran	139	6	8	9	23	11th
2026 Taranto	170	3	4	12	19	14th
Total		58	68	111	237	13th

== See also ==
- Slovenia at the Olympics
- Slovenia at the Paralympics
