= 1993 Mediterranean Games =

12th edition of the Mediterranean Games

XII Mediterranean Games Languedoc-Roussillon 1993
- Host city: Languedoc-Roussillon, France
- Nations: 19
- Athletes: 2,598
- Events: 221 in 25 sports
- Opening: 16 June 1993
- Closing: 27 June 1993
- Opened by: François Mitterrand
- Main venue: Stade Yves-du-Manoir

Official poster of the 1993 MG

The XII Mediterranean Games, commonly known as the 1993 Mediterranean Games, were the 12th Mediterranean Games. The Games were held in Languedoc-Roussillon, France, from 16 June to 27 June 1993, where 2,598 athletes (1,994 men and 604 women) from 19 countries participated. There were a total of 221 medal events from 25 different sports.

== Participating nations ==
The following is a list of nations that participated in the 1993 Mediterranean Games:

- Albania (21)
- Algeria (116)
- Bosnia and Herzegovina (95)
- Croatia (224)
- Cyprus (58)
- Egypt (57)
- France (413)
- Greece (256)
- Italy (345)
- Lebanon (41)
- Malta (10)
- Monaco (14)
- Morocco (149)
- San Marino (13)
- Slovenia (149)
- Spain (339)
- Syria (35)
- Tunisia (60)
- Turkey (217)

== Sports ==
Nineteen nations competed in 25 different sporting events.

- Archery
- Athletics
- Basketball
- Boxing
- Canoeing
- Cycling
- Equestrian
- Fencing
- Football
- Golf
- Gymnastics
- Handball
- Judo
- Karate
- Rowing
- Rugby union
- Sailing
- Shooting
- Swimming
- Table tennis
- Tennis
- Volleyball
- Water polo
- Weightlifting
- Wrestling

== Medal table ==
* Host nation (France)

Rank	Nation	Gold	Silver	Bronze	Total
1	France*	83	53	56	192
2	Italy	37	44	40	121
3	Turkey	34	20	10	64
4	Greece	17	25	24	66
5	Spain	13	40	33	86
6	Croatia	9	6	19	34
7	Morocco	7	7	13	27
8	Algeria	5	6	11	22
9	Slovenia	5	6	8	19
10	Egypt	4	9	16	29
11	Syria	4	2	5	11
12	Bosnia and Herzegovina	2	0	1	3
13	Tunisia	1	1	8	10
14	Albania	0	2	0	2
15	Cyprus	0	1	2	3
16	San Marino	0	1	0	1
17	Malta	0	0	1	1
Totals (17 entries)		221	223	247	691

== See also ==
- International Mediterranean Games Committee
- All results at gbrathletics website
