= 2019 Mediterranean Beach Games =

II Mediterranean Beach Games
- Nations: 26
- Athletes: 700
- Events: 55 in 11 sports
- Opening: 25 August 2019
- Closing: 31 August 2019
- Opened by: Eleftherios Avgenakis; Deputy Minister for Sports
- Website: mbgpatras2019.gr

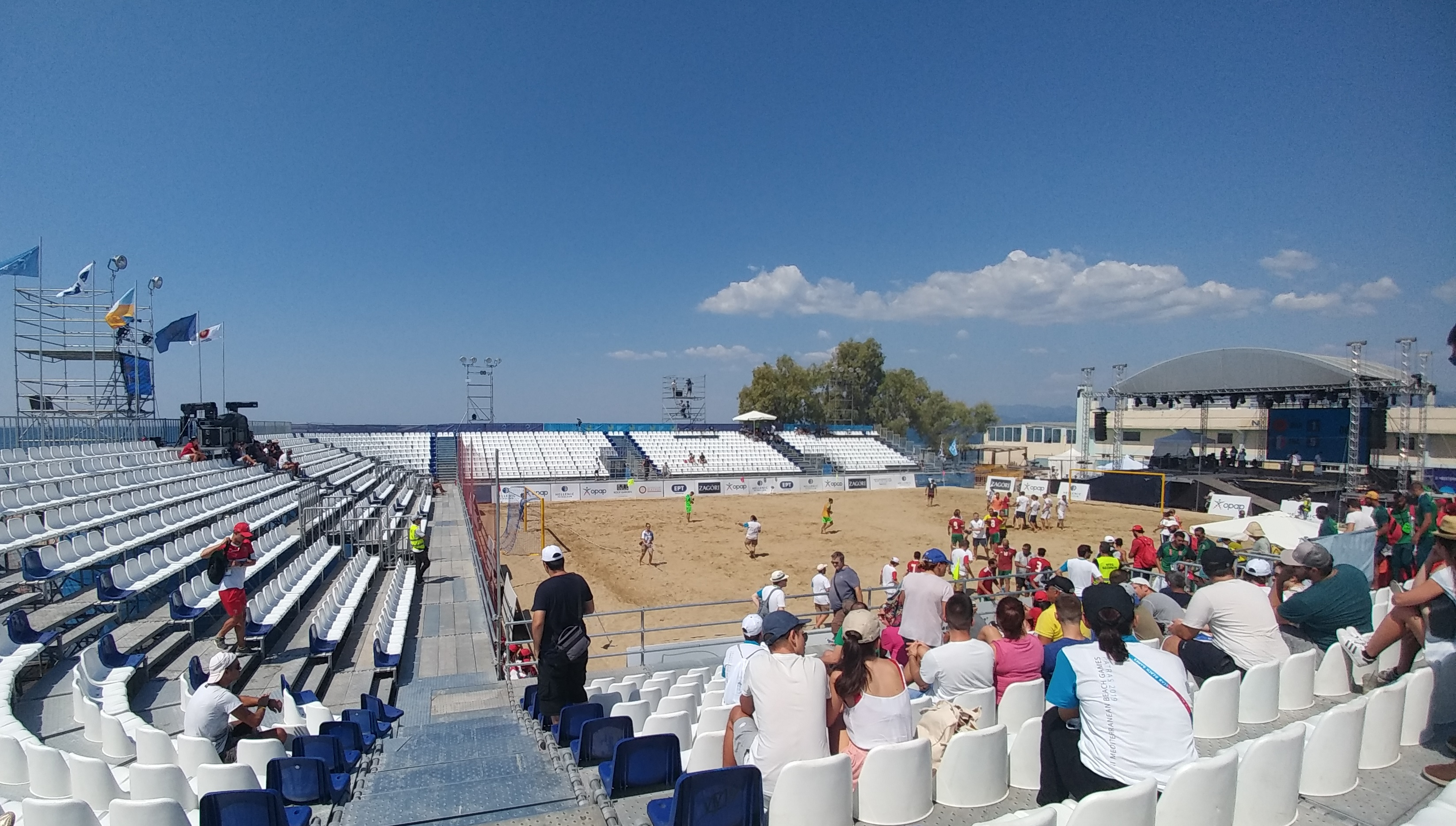
II Mediterranean Beach Games. Beach Soccer 3rd Place Final: Morocco vs. France = 1-5. Patras, GRE, 31 Aug 2019.

The 2019 Mediterranean Beach Games (Greek: Μεσογειακοί Παράκτιοι Αγώνες 2019) is the second edition of the Mediterranean Beach Games. It was held from 25 to 31 August 2019 in Patras, Greece.

== Host city selection ==
The Greek city of Patras was elected as host city of the second edition of the Mediterranean Beach Games (2019) during the ordinary General Assembly of the ICMG which was held in 2017 at Tarragona, Spain.

== Sports ==
Eleven sports featured in these Games.

- Aquathlon (2)
- Beach handball (2)
- Beach soccer (1)
- Beach tennis (3)
- Beach volleyball (2)
- Beach wrestling (6)
- Canoe ocean racing (2)
- Finswimming (16+5) (Pool+Open Water)
- Open water swimming (3)
- Rowing beach sprint (7)
- Water skiing (6)

== Participating nations ==
26 member nations of the International Committee for the Mediterranean Games competed in the II Mediterranean Beach Games. To the countries that participated in 2015 there was an addition of two more: Portugal and Kosovo.

- Albania
- Algeria
- Andorra
- Bosnia and Herzegovina
- Croatia
- Cyprus
- Egypt
- France
- Greece (host country)
- Italy
- Kosovo
- Lebanon
- Libya
- North Macedonia
- Malta
- Monaco
- Montenegro
- Morocco
- Portugal
- San Marino
- Serbia
- Slovenia
- Spain
- Syria
- Tunisia
- Turkey

== Medal table ==
Final medal standings are shown below, information from official website of 2019 Mediterranean Beach Games for 55 events. One share gold and one shared silver in finswimming.

* Host nation (Greece)

Rank	Nation	Gold	Silver	Bronze	Total
1	Greece*	19	16	11	46
2	Italy	15	13	11	39
3	France	13	7	12	32
4	Spain	6	5	7	18
5	Portugal	1	5	0	6
6	Turkey	1	0	3	4
7	Albania	1	0	0	1
8	Tunisia	0	4	2	6
9	Croatia	0	3	2	5
10	Syria	0	1	2	3
11	Algeria	0	1	0	1
12	Monaco	0	0	2	2
13	Cyprus	0	0	1	1
13	San Marino	0	0	1	1
Totals (14 entries)		56	55	54	165

== Medalists ==
=== Aquathlon ===
Event	Gold	Silver	Bronze
Men	Kevin Viñuela; Spain	Pedro Mendes; Portugal	Mohamad Maso; Syria
Women	Sara Guerrero; Spain	Ana Luísa Ramos; Portugal	Stavroulla Pericleous; Cyprus

=== Beach handball ===
Event	Gold	Silver	Bronze
Men	Greece; Theodoros Boskos; Stylianos Dimakis; Georgios Eleftheriadis; Kanellos Georgiou; Konstantinos Gourgoumis; Dionysios Karagkiozopoulos; Ioannis Kotsamarikoglou; Georgios Papavasilis; Konstantinos Theodorou; Chrysanthos Tsanaxidis	Portugal; Nuno Almeida; Nuno Brito; Daniel Costa; Pedro Garcia; Goncalo Jesus; Vítor Pinhal; João Pinho; Rui Rodrigues; Rúben Serrano; Vasco Silva	Croatia; Mateo Budic; Nikola Finek; Filip Goričanec; Filip Dominik Hančić; Mario Lacković; Tomislav Laus; Josip Leko; Nikola Marcius; Josip Matezovic; Ivan Palac
Women	Greece; Evgenia Diakogianni; Ntafina Dimitri; Anna Kaloidi; Eleni Kerlidi; Aliki Makri; Elisavet Mastaka; Eleni Mournou; Eleni Poimenidou; Niki Ratsika; Vasiliki Skara	Portugal; Mariana Agostinho; Rita Alves; Carolina Gomes; Daniela Mendes; Catarina Oliveira; Sara Pinho; Patrícia Resende; Rosa Ribeiro; Maria Santos; Filipa Ventura	Italy; Carelle Djiogap; Vanessa Djiogap; Cristina Gheorghe; Diana Kobilica; Valentina Landri; Cyrielle Lauretti; Giovanna Lucarini; Monika Prünster; Anja Rossignoli; Matilde Tisato

=== Beach tennis ===
Event	Gold	Silver	Bronze
Men's doubles	Italy; Tommaso Giovannini; Dennis Valmori	Spain; Antonio Ramos; Gerard Rodriguez	France; Nicolas Gianotti; Mathieu Guegano
Women's doubles	Italy; Nicole Nobile; Ninny Valentini	Italy; Veronica Casadei; Greta Giusti	Spain; Eva Fernandez; Sabrina Lopez
Mixed doubles	Italy; Ninny Valentini; Diego Bollettinari	Italy; Nicole Nobile; Tommaso Giovannini	San Marino; Nicolò Bombini; Alice Grandi

=== Beach volleyball ===
Event	Gold	Silver	Bronze
Men	France; Olivier Barthelemy; Arnaud Loiseau	France; Timothée Platre; Jérémy Silvestre	Spain; Javier Huerta; Oscar Jimenez
Women	France; Aline Chamereau; Alexandra Jupiter	Cyprus; Mariota Angelopoulou; Manolina Konstantinou	Greece; Vassiliki Arvaniti; Peny Karagkouni

=== Beach wrestling ===
Event	Gold	Silver	Bronze
Men's 70 kg	Quentin Sticker; France	Fotios Papadakis; Greece	Niko Arouzmanidis; Greece
Men's 80 kg	Kyrillos Binenmpaoum; Greece	Georgios Koulouchidis; Greece	Mhd Feda Aldin Alasta; Syria
Men's 90 kg	Pedro Garcia; Spain	Grigorios Kriaridis; Greece	Carmelo Lumia; Italy
Men's +90 kg	Paris Karepi; Albania	Omar Sarem; Syria	Guglielmo Cecca; Italy
Women's 70 kg	Sara da Col; Italy	Zoi Chatsatourova; Greece	Agoro Papavasileiou; Greece
Women's +70 kg	Aikaterini-Eirini Pitsiava; Greece	Enrica Rinaldi; Italy	Parthena Nena Lykopoulou; Greece

=== Canoe ocean racing ===
Event	Gold	Silver	Bronze
Men	Walter Sanchez; Spain	Victor Doux; France	Esteban Medina; Spain
Women	Angie Le Roux; France	Judit Verges; Spain	Amaia Osaba; Spain

=== Finswimming ===
Men

Event	Gold	Silver	Bronze
50 m apnea	Ioannis Pipinias; Greece	Anastasios Mylonakis; Greece	Filip Strikinac; Croatia
50 m bi-fins	Christos Bonias; Greece	Stefanos Antoniadis; Greece	shared silver
50 m bi-fins	Christos Bonias; Greece	Riccardo Romano; Italy	shared silver
100 m bi-fins	Stefanos Antoniadis; Greece	Christos Bonias; Greece	Youssef Naffeti; Tunisia
200 m bi-fins	Konstantinos Drygoutis; Greece	Youssef Naffeti; Tunisia	José Antonio Alonso; Spain
Open water 2 km bi-fins	Konstantinos Drygoutis; Greece	José Antonio Alonso; Spain	Youssef Naffeti; Tunisia
100 m surface	Anastasios Mylonakis; Greece	Ioannis Pipinias; Greece	Tugcan Kaytar; Turkey
200 m surface	Tugcan Kaytar; Turkey	shared gold	Davide de Ceglie; Italy
200 m surface	Anastasios Mylonakis; Greece	shared gold	Davide de Ceglie; Italy
400 m surface	Stefano Figini; Italy	Gianluca Allegretti; Italy	Derin Toparlak; Turkey
Open water 4 km surface	Davide de Ceglie; Italy	Marios Armoutsis; Greece	Louis Dumard; France

Women

Event	Gold	Silver	Bronze
50 m apnea	Sofia Ktena; Greece	Dora Bassi; Croatia	Maëlle Lecoeur; France
50 m bi-fins	Viola Magoga; Italy	Silvia Barnes; Spain	Elisa Mammi; Italy
100 m bi-fins	Viola Magoga; Italy	Sofia Ktena; Greece	Alycia Klein; France
200 m bi-fins	Elisa Mammi; Italy	Evdoxia Thomakou; Greece	Alycia Klein; France
Open water 2 km bi-fins	Sonia Fargas; Spain	Elisa Mammi; Italy	Evdoxia Thomakou; Greece
100 m surface	Eirini Deligianni; Greece	Dora Bassi; Croatia	Erica Barbon; Italy
200 m surface	Eirini Deligianni; Greece	Dora Bassi; Croatia	Loren Baron; France
400 m surface	Loren Baron; France	Ioanna Panagiotidou; Greece	Silvia Sevignani; Italy
Open water 4 km surface	Anastasia Politou; Greece	Loren Baron; France	Mara Zaghet; Italy

Mixed

Event	Gold	Silver	Bronze
4 × 100 m surface	Greece; Sofia Ktena; Anastasios Mylonakis; Ioannis Pipinias; Eirini Deligianni	France; Maëlle Lecoeur; Stanys Caron; Loren Baron; Hugo Meyer	Turkey; Tugcan Kaytar; Omer Faruk Saydam; Beril Ulker; Ayşe Ceren Yeşilbaş
Open water relay 2 km surface	Italy; Gianluca Allegretti; Davide de Ceglie; Silvia Sevignani; Mara Zaghet	Greece; Marios Armoutsis; Ioannis Pipinias; Anastasia Politou; Evdoxia Thomakou	France; Louis Dumard; Maëlle Lecoeur; Colas Zugmeyer; Loren Baron
4 × 50 m bi-fins	Italy; Viola Magoga; Elisa Mammi; Riccardo Romano; Michele Russo	Greece; Stefanos Antoniadis; Christos Bonias; Sofia Ktena; Evdoxia Thomakou	Spain; José Antonio Alonso; Silvia Barnes; Sonia Fargas; José Antonio Perez

=== Open water swimming ===
Event	Gold	Silver	Bronze
Men's 5 km	Andrea Manzi; Italy	Hassaine Aymen; Algeria	Georgios Arniakos; Greece
Women's 5 km	Silvia Ciccarella; Italy	Ginevra Taddeucci; Italy	Sofie Callo; Italy
Mixed 5 km	Portugal; Tiago Campos; Rafael Gil; Angélica André	Italy; Andrea Manzi; Marcello Guidi; Silvia Ciccarella	Greece; Dimitrios Manios; Georgios Arniakos; Styliani Aplanti

=== Rowing beach sprint ===
Event	Gold	Silver	Bronze
Men's C1x	Clément Thomas; France	Mohamed Khalil Mansouri; Tunisia	Adolfo Ferrer; Spain
Men's C2x	France; Gaëtan Delhon; Vincent Noirot	Tunisia; Ghaith Gadri; Dhiaeddine Zoghlami	Monaco; Maxime Maillet; Mathias Raymond
Men's C4x+	Greece; Petros Ballis; Michail Kalentzis; Ioannis Pekopoulos; Panagiotis Ypsilantis; Panagiota Gkeka	France; Ivan Bové; Vincent Devulder; Louis Droissart; Nicolas Gilbert; Maxence Tollet	Italy; Stefano Gioia; Raffaele Giulivo; Niccolò Pagani; Aniello Sabbatino; Piero Sfiligoi
Women's C1x	Jessica Berra; France	Zoi Fitsiou; Greece	Alice Rossi; Italy
Women's C2x	France; Edwige Alfred; Joséphine Cornut	Tunisia; Sahar Moumni; Sarra Zammali	Monaco; Coline Caussin; Clara Stefanelli
Women's C4x+	Italy; Marta Barelli; Arianna Bini; Maria Benedetta Faravelli; Serena Lo Bue; Giorgia Pelacchi	Spain; Maria Amores; Sofia Anton; Violeta Belda; Ana Navarro; Sergio Lopez	France; Justine Bandiera; Apolline Carmagnac; Anne-Élise Communal; Perrine Delaporte; Aurore Vandenbroucke
Relay	Spain; Sofia Anton; Violeta Belda; Adolfo Ferrer; Marcelino Garcia; Ana Navarro; Alejandro Vera	Greece; Konstantinos Chatzipateras; Zoi Fitsiou; Efseveia Prigkou; Varvara Strati; Panagiotis Tsivoglou; Konstantinos Zintiridis	France; Edwige Alfred; Jessica Berra; Joséphine Cornut; Gaëtan Delhon; Vincent Noirot; Clément Thomas

=== Water skiing ===
Event	Gold	Silver	Bronze
Men's slalom	Filippos Kyprios; Greece	Nicholas Benatti; Italy	Tanguy Dailland; France
Men's tricks	Nikolas Plytas; Greece	Tanguy Dailland; France	Alexandre Poteau; France
Women's slalom	Ambre Franc; France	Camille Poulain; France	Angeliki Andriopoulou; Greece
Women's tricks	Camille Poulain; France	Greta Tagliati; Italy	Angeliki Andriopoulou; Greece
Men's wakeboard	Maxime Roux; France	Igor Colombo; Italy	Nikolas Plytas; Greece
Women's wakeboard	Aurélie Godet; France	Julia Molinari; Italy	Aikaterini Andreopoulou; Greece

== Venues ==
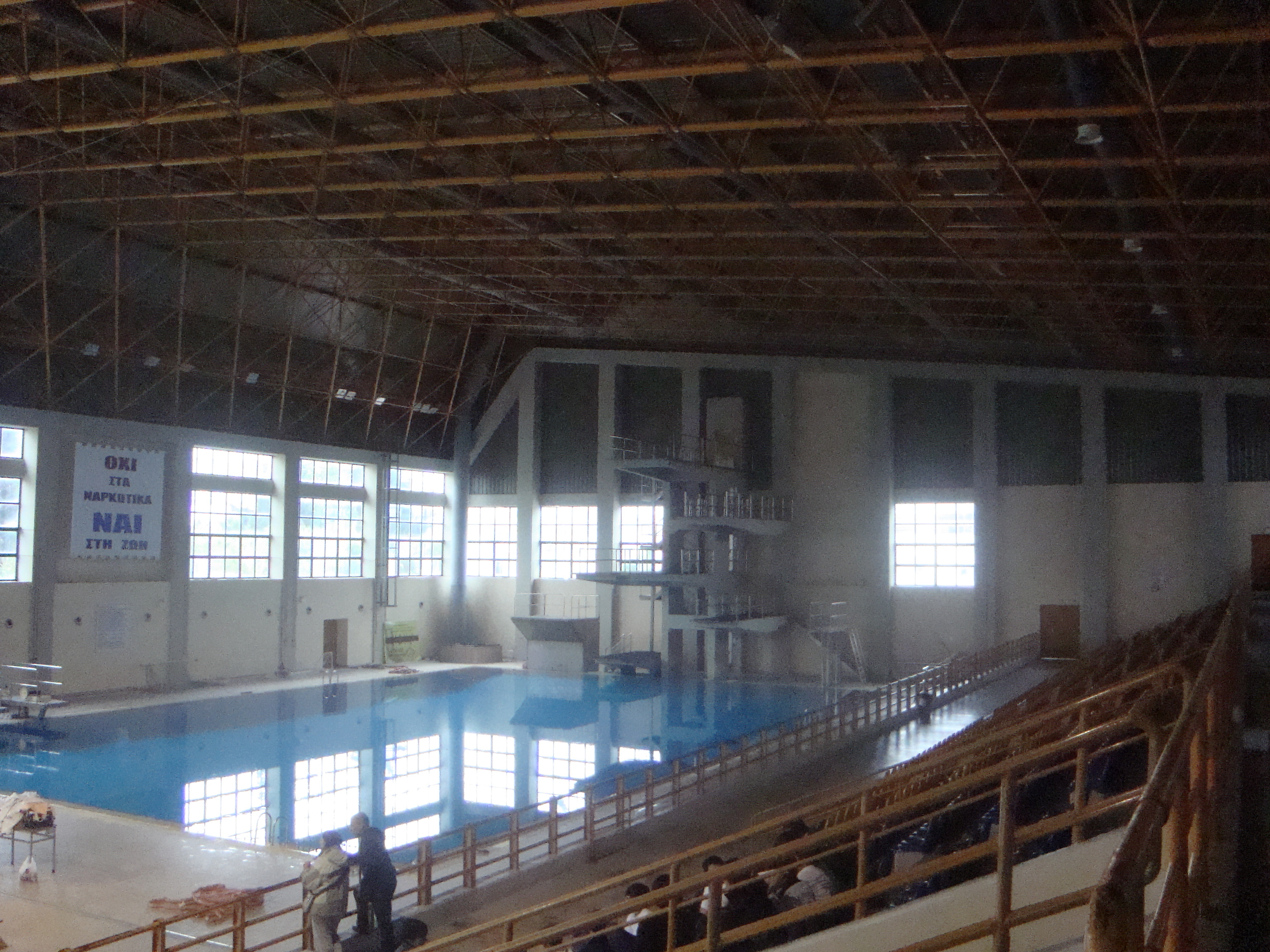
Antonios Pepanos aquatic center

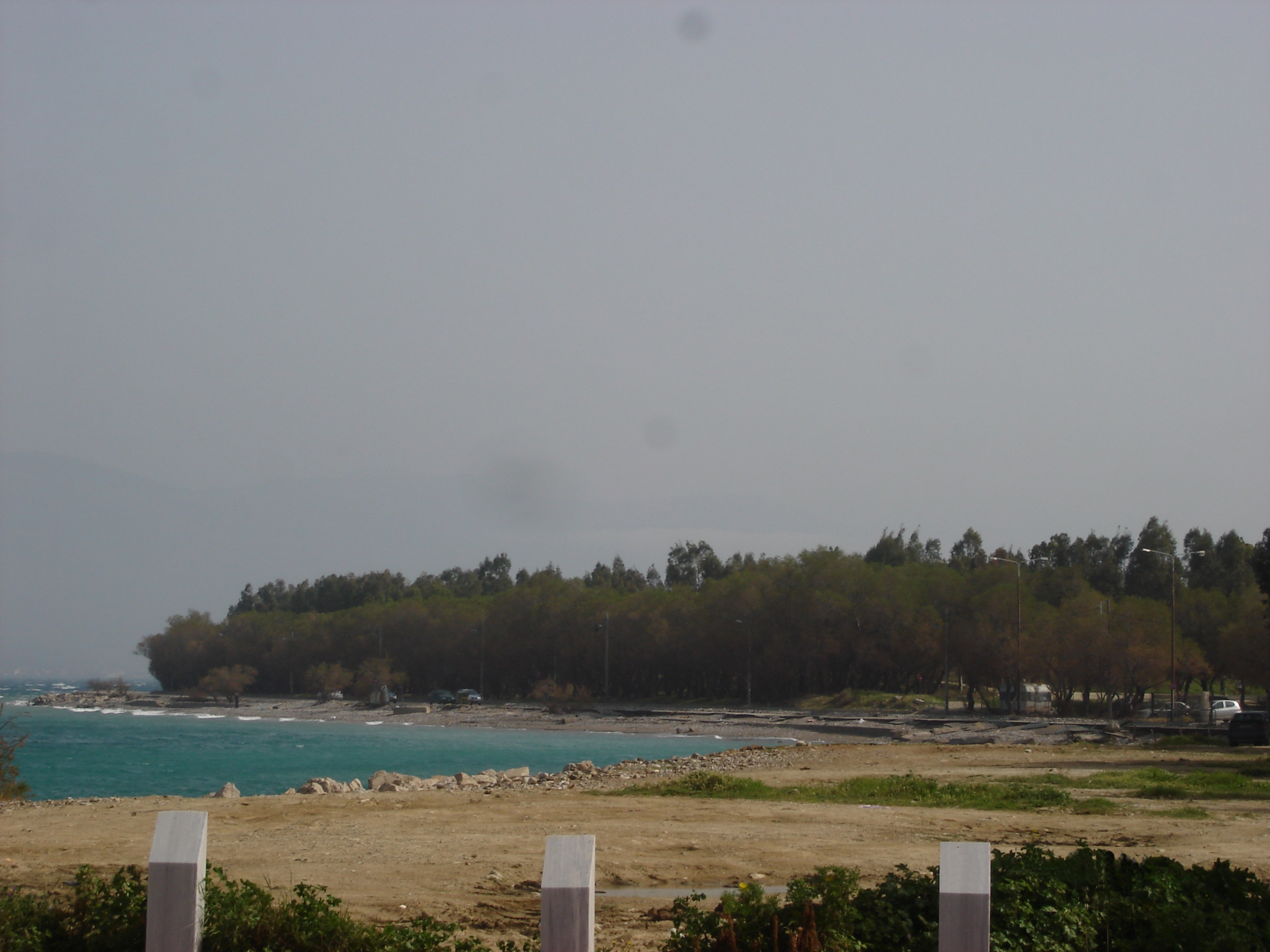
Agyia seaside front (north)

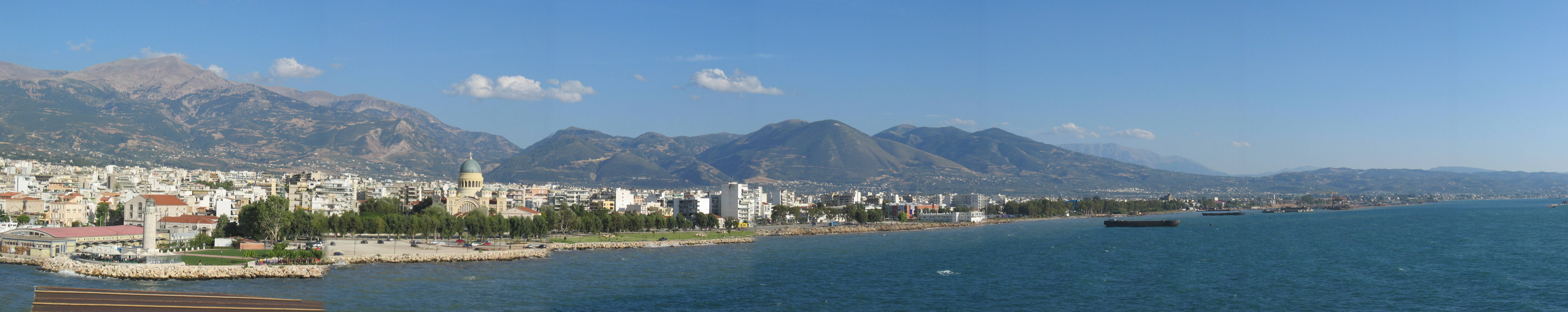
Lighthouse & St Andrew seaside front (south)
