= 2020 Summer Olympics opening ceremony =

Coordinates: 35°40′41″N 139°42′54″E

- Part of 2020 Summer Olympics
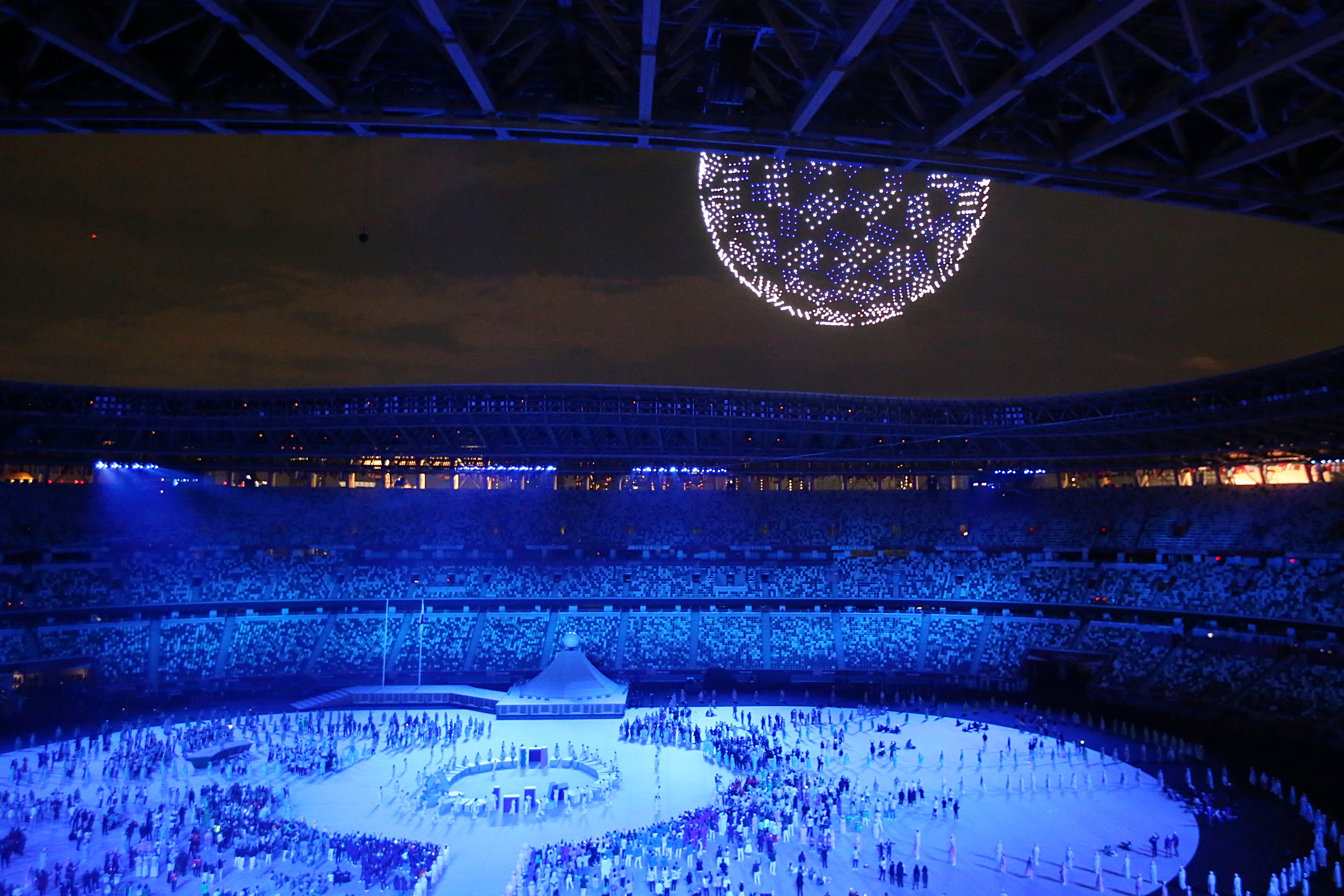
- The "Imagine" portion featured drones that project the Tokyo 2020 logo shapes and the globe itself.
- Date: 23 July 2021; 5 years ago
- Time: 20:00 – 23:50 JST (UTC+9)
- Venue: Olympic Stadium
- Location: Tokyo, Japan
- Theme: "Moving Forward: United by Emotion"
- Filmed by: Olympic Broadcasting Services (OBS)
- Footage: 2020 Summer Olympics Opening Ceremony in Olympic Channel on YouTube

The opening ceremony of the postponed 2020 Summer Olympics took place on 23 July 2021 at the Olympic Stadium, Tokyo, and was formally opened by Emperor Naruhito. As mandated by the Olympic Charter, the proceedings combined the formal and ceremonial opening of this international sporting event, including welcoming speeches, hoisting of the flags and the parade of athletes, with an artistic spectacle to showcase the host nation's culture and history. The majority of the artistic spectacle was pre-recorded, with live segments performed adhering to social distancing to athletes, officials and a small VIP audience. The ceremony marked the 125th anniversary of the 1896 Summer Olympics in Athens—the inaugural edition of the modern Olympic Games.

The opening ceremony was originally planned to start on 24 July 2020. On 24 March 2020, the games were postponed to 2021 because of the global COVID-19 pandemic, however, the "Tokyo 2020" branding was retained to preserve the 4-year summer Olympiad cycle. The theme of the 2020 Olympic and Paralympic Ceremonies was Moving Forward, which referenced the global COVID-19 pandemic. The opening ceremony theme was the Tokyo 2020 motto United by Emotion, with the aim to "reaffirm the role of sport and the value of the Olympic Games." The ceremony expressed responses to the pandemic by the athlete community, congratulate front-line workers, and included themes of lament, waiting and hope. The ceremony also showcased Japanese popular culture such as Japanese theater, video games, and variety shows, such as Kasou Taishou. For the second time in an Olympic opening ceremony, a minute of silence was observed in honor of the Munich massacre's 50th anniversary at the 1972 Summer Olympics.

== Preparations ==
=== January 2017–December 2020: Original plans ===
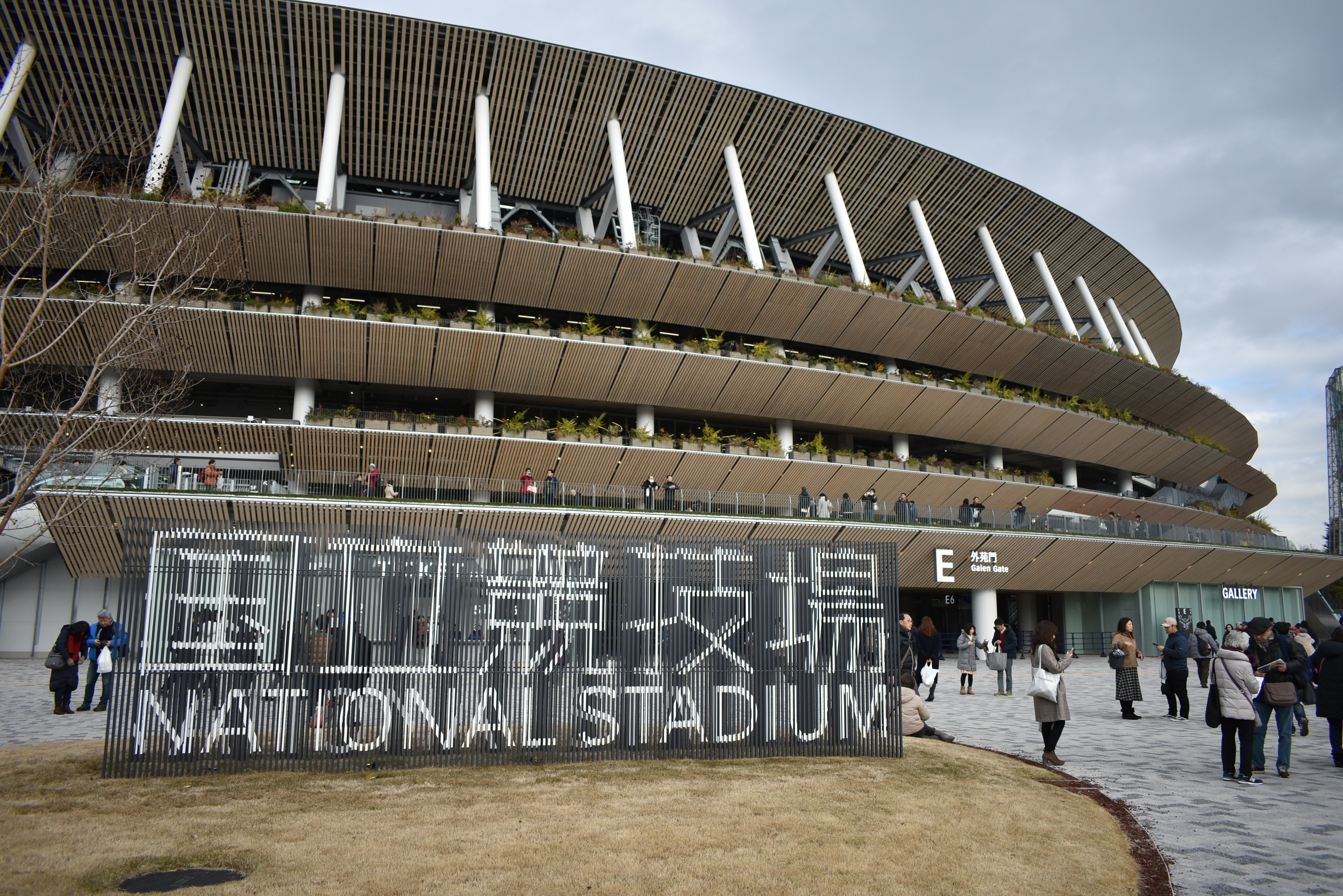
Japan National Stadium (Olympic Stadium)

The Tokyo Organising Committee of the Olympic and Paralympic Games (TOCOG) gave the first report of preparations in December 2017, with the release of the "Basic Policy" document for the Olympic and Paralympic ceremonies. The document was based upon feedback from experts and opinions of the Japanese public and includes the foundational elements for the positioning and overall concept of the four ceremonies. The Olympic opening ceremony is to introduce the themes and concepts of the four ceremonies, including peace, coexistence, reconstruction, the future, Japan and Tokyo, the athletes and involvement.

Between July 2018 and December 2020, Mansai Nomura, an actor in traditional Japanese theater, was the chief creative director. Marco Balich of Balich Worldwide Shows, was the Senior Adviser to the Executive Producer. Balich was involved as producer of the ceremonies of the 2006 Winter Olympics, 2014 Winter Olympics and the 2016 Summer Olympics, and has done other international ceremonies such as the 2019 Summer Universiade and the 2019 Pan American Games in Lima. In July 2019, he mentioned that his involvement will be in partnership with the Japanese advertising company Dentsu. Dentsu's creative director for these ceremonies, Kaoru Sugano, resigned in January 2020 over harassment claims.

The new National Stadium, called Olympic Stadium during the Games, served as the main venue for the opening ceremony. Demolition of old National Stadium was completed in May 2015. Construction of the new stadium began at the site on 11 December 2016. The stadium was handed over to the IOC on 30 November 2019 for preparations. Had the pandemic not happen, audience of the stadium during the Olympic Games would have been 60,102, including account press and executive seating areas. Before the announcement of barring spectators was made, ticket prices for the opening ceremony were expected to range between ¥12,000 and ¥300,000.

Previous Olympic opening ceremonies in Japan, such as the 1998 Winter Olympics opening ceremony in Nagano, mixed ancient Japanese cultural elements with themes of peace, tolerance and coexistence. Reports from Inside the Games and Kyodo News in January 2020 suggested that this time would be a bigger focus on technology and its popular culture. According to reports from Shūkan Bunshun, the original program would include numerous references to J-pop and video games with the creative team led by world known choreographer MIKIKO, before it was scaled back. The plan was to follow on with what was presented in the Rio 2016 closing ceremony, where then Prime Minister Shinzo Abe dressed as Mario in the handover segment.

According to the leak, the following artists, musicians, actors and cultural franchises were to appear in the ceremony:

- The ceremony would have begun with an emulation from a scene from Akira manga where Kaneda is racing on a motorcycle;
- Pop group Perfume were due to sing "Welcome to Tokyo," while the stadium would project computer generated imagery of the city's scenery and representing the Special wards of Tokyo, ending with one thing that connects the wards - the Subway systems;
- Singer Daichi Miura was to arrive from a wired frame car as a Tokyo Station staff member. His performance would evoke Tokyo's natural landscape with his face turning into a tree. Actress Tao Tsuchiya and Tomohiko Tsujimoto were due to dance in a scene representing vitality of Japanese nature scenery before a tree turned into an eye and a clock, with then dancing duo AyaBambi to dance in the middle of the clock;
- Dancer Koharu Sugawara was to perform a choreography that would emulate the traditional tea ceremony;
- Dance group Tokyo Gegegay along with local high school students were due to perform with influences from the anime film Neo Tokyo;
- The entry of the Japanese flag would be guided by the actor Mirai Moriyama holding a glowing bō performing various elements of various Japanese martial arts. Next, a group of children would enter with the flag while holding lanterns.
- Comedian Naomi Watanabe was to perform in a skit as an office worker stuck in a post-apocalyptic world. She would be watching a flashback of the 1964 Summer Olympics on her computer. After the pre-recorded sequence, dancers with balls would have appeared with her and "READY" sign was to be shown before athletes entering the stadium while a drone show happened above their heads. The Wards of Tokyo would then transform into a projection of the globe;
- Before the lighting of the Olympic Cauldron, a segment featuring popular video games and anime would be performed before the lighting of the Olympic Flame, with Nintendo representatives including Mario creator Shigeru Miyamoto supervising the segment. Mario would have set to appear from a Warp Pipe, with appearances from well-known video game characters including Pac-Man, Pikachu from Pokémon and Sonic the Hedgehog, and anime characters Hello Kitty, Tsubasa Oozora from Captain Tsubasa, Doraemon and Goku from Dragon Ball. Mario would then reappear on an 8-bit with a group of dancers were to perform as various Olympic sports.
- The sequence of the Olympic cauldron would be practically the same as that presented at the ceremony.

=== December 2020–July 2021: Impact of COVID-19 ===
In February 2020, following announcements that the Tokyo Marathon would be scaled back and restricted to elite athletes due to the emerging COVID-19 pandemic, speculation grew about whether the 2020 Summer Olympics could proceed as planned. Health officials, epidemiologists, and sports organizers began raising concerns about the feasibility of hosting a global multi-sport event during an unprecedented international health crisis. On 24 March 2020, after weeks of increasing international pressure and consultation with the World Health Organization, the International Olympic Committee (IOC) and the Tokyo Organizing Committee announced that the Games would be postponed until 2021. The decision marked the first time in Olympic history that the Summer Games were postponed rather than cancelled altogether. Both the 2020 Summer Olympics and the Paralympics were rescheduled, with the IOC affirming that they would be held no later than the summer of 2021. A subsequent announcement on 30 March 2020 confirmed that the opening ceremony was rescheduled for 23 July 2021, almost exactly one year after its original date.

The postponement had wide-ranging effects on logistics, athlete preparation, sponsorship agreements, and public perception of the Games. Throughout late 2020 and 2021, discussions continued over how ceremonies could be held safely, with many plans repeatedly revised or abandoned in response to fluctuating infection rates in Japan. Organizers were under pressure to balance traditional grandeur with public health restrictions, while also addressing growing skepticism from Japanese citizens, a majority of whom expressed opposition to holding the Olympics in surveys conducted in mid-2021.

In December 2020, a major leadership change occurred when Nomura Mansai, the Chief Creative Director of the ceremonies, stepped down. This led to the dissolution of his production team. Veteran stage director Hiroshi Sasaki was appointed as his successor, with Nomura staying on only as an advisor. At his introductory press conference, Sasaki remarked that earlier ceremony concepts were “too extravagant” in tone, and suggested that they would be restructured into a more modest, reflective program in line with the public mood and international expectations during the pandemic.

However, further controversy followed. In March 2021, Sasaki resigned after it was revealed that he had made derogatory suggestions about comedian Naomi Watanabe’s potential role in the opening ceremony. This resignation came only weeks after Tokyo 2020 president Yoshirō Mori himself stepped down following public backlash over sexist remarks he made about women in meetings. Sasaki’s departure added to a sense of instability around the creative leadership of the ceremonies. He was replaced by Kentarō Kobayashi, who became chief creative director, supported by Takayuki Hioki of Sports Branding Japan as deputy chief ceremonies officer and executive producer.

By late 2020 and early 2021, organizers were also debating the issue of audience attendance. While early discussions considered reduced capacity, by July 2021 it was determined that no live audience would be permitted due to public health concerns. The final compromise allowed only competing athletes (if they chose to attend), a maximum of six officials from each delegation, and a limited number of invited VIP guests. Much of the artistic and cultural programming was modified to comply with social distancing requirements, with many segments being pre-recorded rather than performed live. These measures reinforced the unprecedented and subdued atmosphere surrounding the Games.

On 14 July 2021, the Tokyo Organising Committee released a press statement unveiling the central concept of the ceremonies. The overarching theme was "Moving Forward," intended to highlight resilience, recovery, and the power of sport in the wake of the global pandemic. According to the creative team, the aim was to inspire hope and encouragement worldwide, with athletes themselves representing symbols of perseverance and renewal. Commentators noted that this thematic framing echoed statements made in March 2020 by producer Marco Balich, who had predicted that the ceremonies would inevitably have to acknowledge the pandemic and its transformative impact on global society.

Alongside the thematic announcement, the committee revealed a list of composers. Among them was Keigo Oyamada, whose appointment quickly provoked controversy when past interviews resurfaced in which he admitted to bullying classmates with disabilities. The revelations triggered intense criticism on social media and in Japanese and international media outlets. Oyamada initially retained support from Olympic officials, including chief executive Toshirō Mutō, who argued for his continued participation despite widespread criticism. Yet on 19 July 2021, only days before the opening ceremony, Oyamada issued a formal apology and resigned, with his compositions removed from the official program.

Even greater disruption struck on 22 July 2021, when Kentarō Kobayashi, the chief creative director of the ceremonies, was dismissed after footage resurfaced of a 1998 comedy routine in which he made jokes about the Holocaust. The sacking, occurring less than 24 hours before the opening ceremony, forced a last-minute review of the show’s content. Prime Minister Yoshihide Suga, serving as supreme advisor and chairperson of the organizing committee, condemned Kobayashi’s past remarks as “outrageous and unacceptable,” though he affirmed that the ceremony would still proceed as scheduled given the impossibility of further delays. The dismissal capped months of turbulence in the ceremony’s preparation, with leadership turnover, ethical controversies, and public health concerns shaping the final event.

== Concept ==
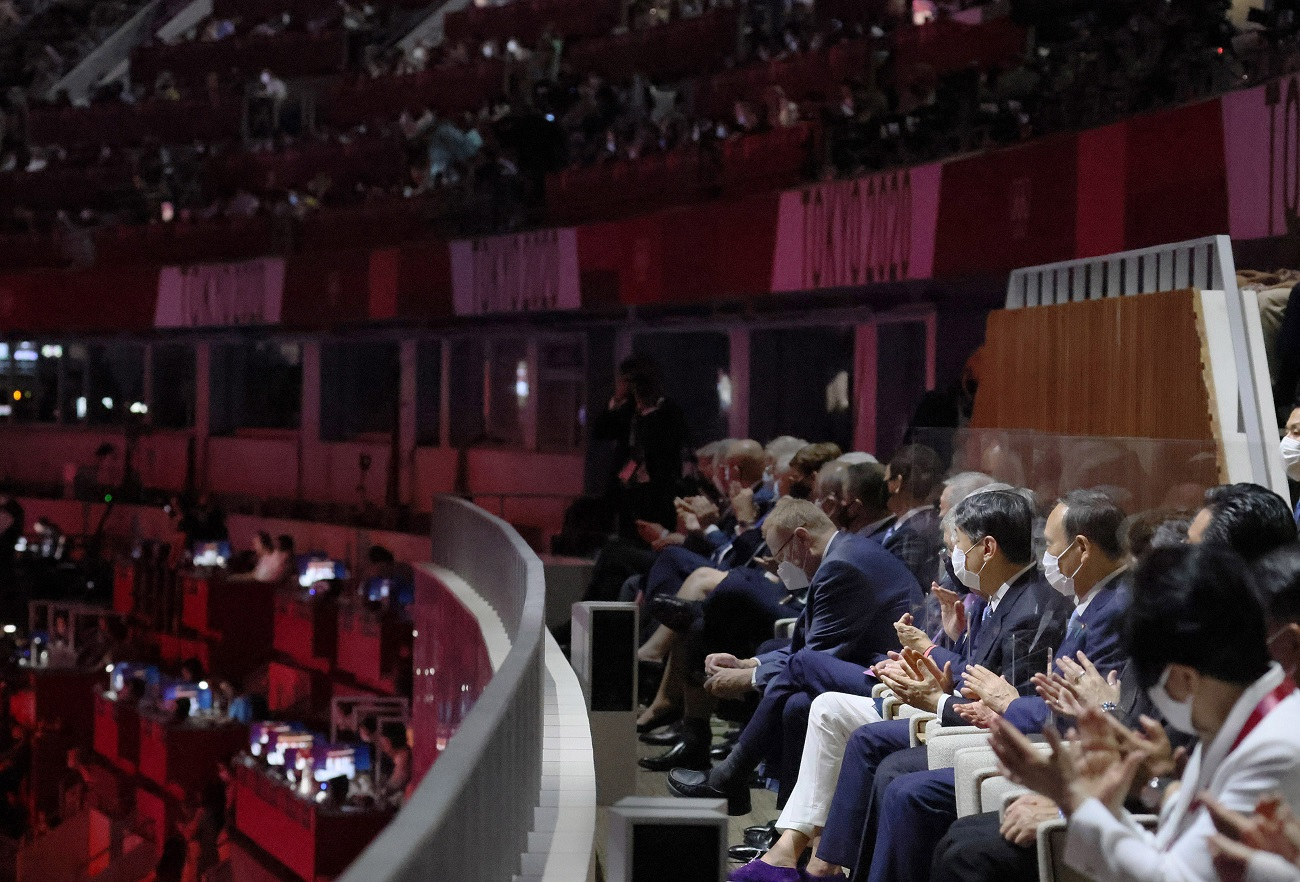
Emperor Naruhito and dignitaries in attendance (at Japan National Stadium on 23 July 2021)

"Moving Forward" was the overarching theme for both 2020 opening and closing ceremonies, as announced by Tokyo 2020: the ceremonies were linked by the concept of "Moving Forward", a reference to recovery from the COVID-19 pandemic. The artistic team said in a statement, "We have designed the ceremonies around the concept that the Games can bring fresh hope and encouragement to people around the world through the active appearance of athletes at the Tokyo 2020 Games and via the power of sport." "United by Emotion", the official motto of the Games, was adopted as the theme of the opening ceremony.

The opening and closing ceremonies was produced by Takayuki Hioki, having been advised by Marco Balich, who notably was part of the development team for some recent Olympic Games opening ceremonies. Balich said of the ceremony that "We will aspire to reaffirm the role of sport and the value of the Olympic Games, to express our gratitude and admiration for the efforts we all made together over the past year, and also to bring a sense of hope for the future. We hope it will be an experience that conveys how we all have the ability to celebrate differences, to empathise, and to live side by side with compassion for one another." Although the creative director of the opening ceremony, Kentarō Kobayashi, was fired the day before the ceremony due to the Holocaust jokes, the organising committee decided to proceed with the ceremony as planned by him.

== Weather conditions ==
- 20:00 temperature 28.0 °C (82.4 °F) humidity 72%
- 23:00 temperature 26.8 °C (80.2 °F) humidity 78%
- At the observation point, it rained in between 20:30 and 20:45, and between 21:20 and 21:35, to the extent that an hourly rainfall of 0 (mm) was recorded.

== Proceedings ==
=== Programme ===
The event, which was set to last three and a half hours, started at 20:00 JST, featured many sequences of the ceremony which were pre-recorded. As part of the "Moving Forward" theme, many segments involved diverse representation and building or re-building. The titles from this section largely come from the organisers.

	Title	Procedure (JST : UTC+9)
1	Prelude	Exhibition Flight by Blue Impulse (12:30–12:35)
2	Where the Stories Begin	Introductory video (20:00–20:03), montage of Tokyo winning the 2020 Games, and the changed lives of athletes (20:03–20:07)
3	Apart but not Alone	Arisa Tsubata appears on a treadmill (20:07–20:10), and abstract dancing performance (20:10–20:13)
4	A Welcome from the Host	Six flag bearers carry the Flag of Japan (20:14–20:18), Misia sings the national anthem of Japan (20:18–20:19), and Mirai Moriyama performs a butō dance (20:20–20:25)
5	A Lasting Legacy	Olympic Rings unveiling (20:26–20:30) and pre-recorded segment of Muhammad Yunus awarding an Olympic Laurel (20:31–20:34)
6	Here Together	Pre-recorded videotape performance by Tokyo Philharmonic Orchestra (20:35–20:37), athletes marching in the stadium (20:37–22:32), a new motto introduced (22:33–22:37), and a half-recorded, half-live performance "Imagine" sung by Angélique Kidjo, Alejandro Sanz, John Legend, and Keith Urban with an appearance of Suginami Junior Chorus (22:38–22:43)
7	Peace Through Sport	Speech by TOCOG President Seiko Hashimoto (22:45–22:49), then IOC President Thomas Bach (22:50–23:03), Emperor Naruhito (declaring the opening of the Games, 23:04), and the raising of Olympic Flag (23:05–23:09) with the Olympic Anthem being sung by Fukushima Students' Choir
8	Let the Games Begin and Time to Shine	Performance by GABEZ and Gamarjobat (23:11–23:19) depicting all 50 pictograms of the events for the games, Hitori Gekidan switching off Tokyo's landmarks (23:20–23:22), and a performances by kabuki actor Ichikawa Ebizō XI and jazz pianist Hiromi Uehara (23:23–23:31)
9	Hope Lights Our Way	Recapping the Olympic Flame's journey started in Greece on 12 March 2020 (Japan leg beginning in Fukushima on 25 March 2021) (23:32–23:37), and the Flame entering the stadium (23:37–23:47)

=== Prelude ===
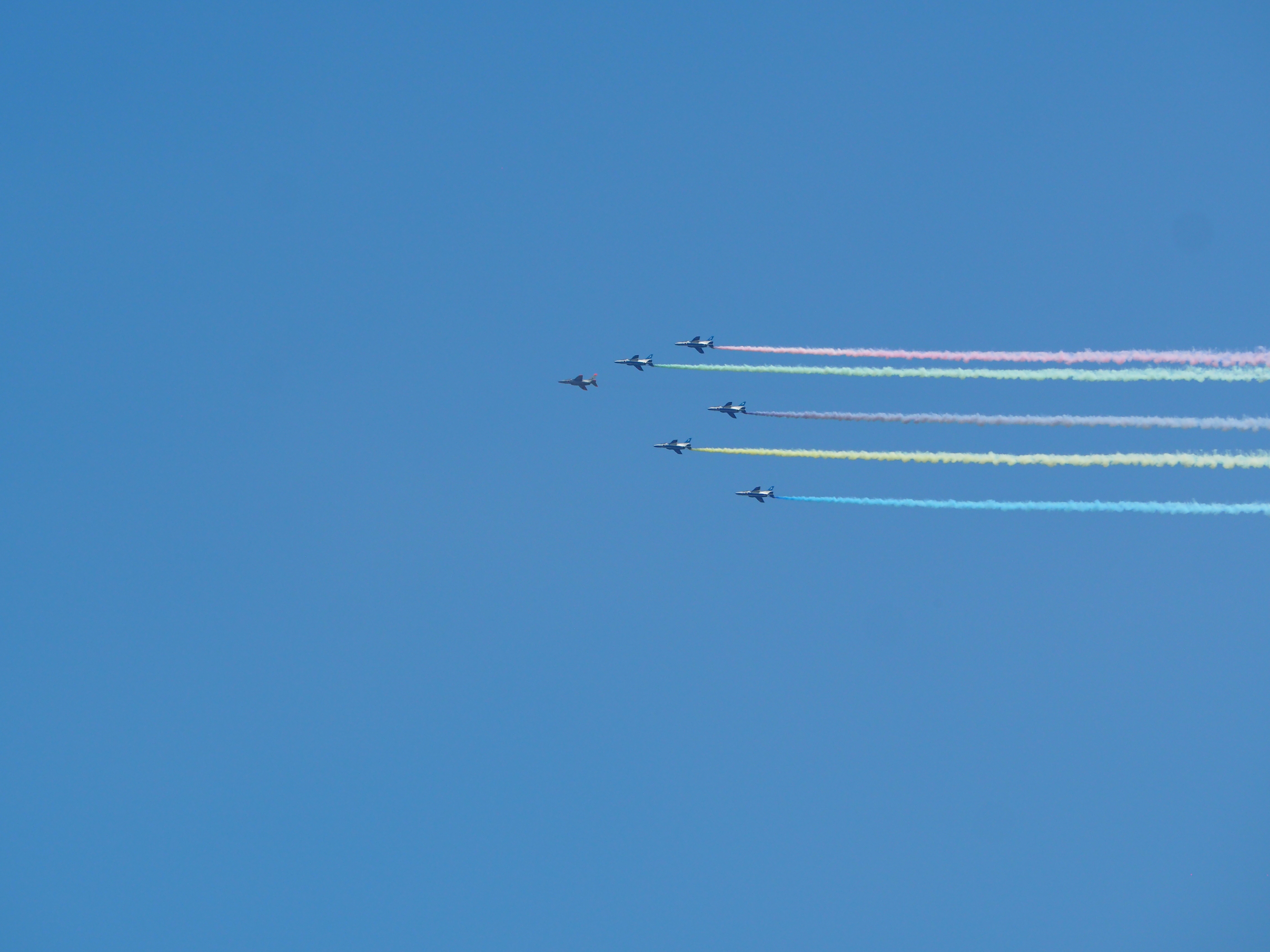
Exhibition flight by Blue Impulse

On the day of the ceremony, there was an exhibition flight by Blue Impulse, the aerobatics squadron of the Japanese Air Self Defense Force. The squadron drew the Olympic Rings over the Tokyo skies, marked the 57th anniversary of the 1964 Games for the first time in Tokyo.

=== "Where the Stories Begin" ===
A stop motion video begins showing many geometric shapes drawn in chalk, before showing a birds eye shot of the stadium. The camera zooms in on National Stadium, while a flock of doves fly by. The camera zooms into the grass ground where it focuses on a seed. Cutting to a live shot, an athlete is lit in green, while a projection of a seedling growing is shown behind the athlete.

A videotaped montage of Tokyo's recap to hosting the Games began, from awarding the rights in 2013 during the 125th IOC Session, to the hard work and training of the athletes, to the 2016 Summer Olympics, to the qualification of the athletes and then, the chaotic events of 2020 when the world suddenly changed, which caused the athletes to continue training from home via video communication. A countdown from '21' referencing the postponement of games played, showing athletes overcoming the challenges of the past year. At 0, 694 fireworks then are then set off.

=== "Apart but Not Alone" ===
The first performance of the ceremony, designed "[showcase] Japan's forte in digital art and projection mapping technology," featured a digital graphics projection on the stadium floor, at the centre of which nurse and boxer Arisa Tsubata, who won a national championship only two years after taking the sport, but was unable to participate as an athlete after being eliminated in the first round of the Asia & Oceania Boxing Olympic Qualification tournament held prior to the pandemic and the games' postponement, jogged on a treadmill, then was joined by performers on an exercise cycle, rowing machine, running in place, while performers abstract danced and coloured ball of light were projected, "symbolising the athletes' plight in training during the pandemic for this event." A dance presentation was performed with dancers wearing white outfits connected by red strings, meant to "portray the inner workings of the body and heart."

=== "A Welcome from the Host" ===
The following act featured the Japanese national flag and was carried by six bearers. They are:

- Yoshinobu Miyake, two time Olympic weightlifting champion
- Naoko Takahashi, Olympic marathon champion
- Momoha Tabata, Youth Olympic curling medallist
- Hibiki Sakai, percussionist
- Keita Dohi, Youth Olympic sport climbing champion
- Mizuki Asaba, a rescue worker who was involved in search and rescue (SAR) mission of the victims of the 2011 Tōhoku earthquake and tsunami

Then, veteran singer Misia, who wore a dress designed "to honour the LGBTQ+ community and symbolise the fight for LGBTQ+ equality" made by openly gay costume designer Tomo Koizumi, sang the National Anthem of Japan while the flag was raised up by the members of the Japan Self-Defense Forces. After the Japanese National Anthem was sung, a tribute was paid for those who had died from COVID-19 and for the victims of the Munich 1972 massacre, one year before the 50th anniversary of that massacre. The actor Mirai Moriyama appeared up dressed in white and, after striking a pose of mourning, performed a butō dance in the middle of the stadium, while tenebrous and funereal music played. Subsequently, a moment of silence was observed at the culmination of this section of the ceremony.

=== "A Lasting Legacy" ===
The unveiling of the Olympic Rings, which were made from trees planted in the Olympic Village during the 1964 Summer Olympics. It starred tap-dancing performers wearing hanten coats, which were traditionally worn by Edo-era craftspeople and carpenters and evoked Japanese summertime festivals, at which this style of clothing is common, as they built what has either been described as a mock Olympic Village or a matsuri, as the rings were brought while being surrounded by Japanese paper lanterns.

A pre-recorded video was shown of Muhammad Yunus receiving the Olympic Laurel award in Bangladesh, because Yunus could not travel to Japan due to travel restrictions related to the COVID-19 pandemic in that country.

=== "Here Together" ===
==== Parade of Nations ====
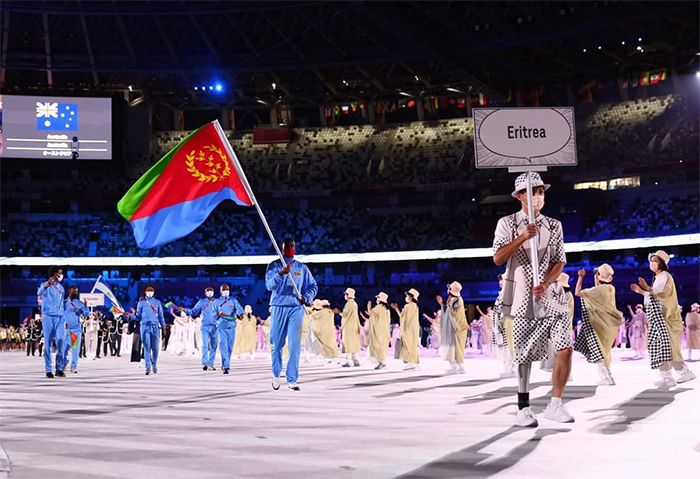
Eritrea at the 2020 Summer Olympics Parade of Nations

The Parade of Nations followed with the team delegations marching into the stadium. Before the athletes marched, a videotaped section was shown showcasing how the world trained for these challenging Olympics.

Athletes entered the stadium in an order dictated by the Olympic tradition. As the originator of the Olympics, the Greek team entered first. With the exception of the refugee team, the French team and the American team, all the others teams entered using the Gojūon alphabetical system. For the first the Japanese language, was used as the main language of the Olympics held in Japan; the English language had been used the previous three times that the Olympics games were held in the country. Following tradition, the delegation from the host nation Japan entered last.

The Refugee Olympic Team, composed of refugees from several countries, was the second nation to enter, after Greece. For the first time ever in the opening ceremony, the countries that will host the next two Olympic Games, France (in 2024) and the United States (in 2028), marched immediately before the host nation Japan entered, instead of entering one-hundred-fifty-fourth (between Brazil and Bulgaria) and seventh (between Afghanistan and United Arab Emirates), respectively, according to the Japanese alphabet order. The names of the teams were announced in French, followed by English and Japanese, the official languages of the Olympic movement and the host nation, in accordance with traditional and International Olympic Committee (IOC) guidelines.

Each of the signboards displaying the countries' names was written in Japanese on one side and English on the other, enclosed in speech balloons, evoking manga panels, while the signholders' costumes had manga tones.

The athletes themselves attended in low numbers compared to previous Olympics, as out of Team USA's 613 and Australia's 472, only about 200 and 63 attended, respectively.

In their entrances, several teams, including Argentina and Ghana, broke into song, while the Twitter account for the Games pointed out an Eritrean athlete who laid down on the ground, which other athletes had done as well while looking at their phones. As Russia had been banned to partake in sporting events by the World Anti-Doping Agency, Russian athletes marched under the ROC designation and flag. Japan inverted the colours of the uniform they had used in the 1964 Olympics, while France paraded in three rows, representing the tricolor flag. Two flagbearers, Tonga's Pita Taufatofua and Vanautu's Riilio Rii, paraded shirtless and oiled. Noticeably, several members of the Kyrgyz and Tajik delegations as well as the Pakistani flagbearers entered the ceremony maskless. During the parade of nations, Mohamad Maso of Syria was reunited with his brother, Alaa, who represented the IOC Refugee Olympic Team.

For the first time, each team had the option to allow two flag bearers, one male and one female, in an effort to promote gender equality.

Before the athletes paraded in, a sign inside the stadium pointed out that the athletes should keep social distance between themselves and how far was the entrance as well as the restroom.

In addition, 19 tracks from popular Japanese video game series were also used during the duration of the two hour-long segment, these being:

- Dragon Quest – "Roto's Theme"
- Final Fantasy – "Victory Fanfare"
- Tales of Zestiria – "Sorey's Theme – The Shepherd"
- Monster Hunter – "Proof of a Hero"
- Kingdom Hearts – "Olympus Coliseum"
- Chrono Trigger – "Frog's Theme"
- Ace Combat – "First Flight"
- Tales of Graces – "Royal – Capital Majestic Grandeur"
- Monster Hunter – "Wind of Departure"
- Chrono Trigger – "Robo's Theme"
- Sonic the Hedgehog – "Star Light Zone"
- Pro Evolution Soccer – "eFootball Walk-on Theme"
- Final Fantasy – "Main Theme"
- Phantasy Star Universe – "Guardians"
- Kingdom Hearts – "Hero's Fanfare"
- Gradius – "01 Act I-1"
- Nier – "Song of the Ancients"
- SaGa – "The Minstrel's Refrain: SaGa Series Medley 2016"
- Soulcalibur – "The Brave New Stage of History"

==== Motto and oath ====
The Parade of Nations finished with the projection of the Olympic motto, "Faster, Higher, Stronger – Together" in the middle of the stadium floor, between the athletes, which were organised into quadrants after they marched in. A message from Kirsty Coventry, the outgoing chair of the IOC Athletes' Commission was played, introducing the new Olympic Oath with the aim of promoting inclusion and the role of Athletes, Judges and Coaches as ambassadors. The following oath was delivered by 6 participants from the Tokyo delegation:

We promise to take part in these Olympic Games, respecting and abiding by the rules and in the spirit of fair play, inclusion and equality. Together we stand in solidarity and commit ourselves to sport without doping, without cheating, without any form of discrimination. We do this for the honour of our teams, in respect for the Fundamental Principles of Olympism, and to make the world a better place through sport.

==== "Imagine" ====
Groups of all ages entered the stadium dancing around boxes, which were organised into three circles and then into the Olympic Games Tokyo 2020 emblem logo. Then, mirroring the previous segment, 1,824 drones made a 3D rendition of the Olympic Games Tokyo 2020 emblem logo over the stadium and then the globe of Earth with its continents.

Following this what Time Out Japan called an "emotional montage", featuring a "half-live, half-recorded performance" of "Imagine", composed by John Lennon, was sung by Angélique Kidjo (Africa), Alejandro Sanz (Europe), John Legend (Americas), and Keith Urban (Oceania), all of whom joined remotely via pre-recorded material; plus the Suginami Junior Chorus, who was live in the stadium. It was arranged by Hans Zimmer, and had musical support provided by TAIKOPROJECT and the Synchron Stage Orchestra and Stage Choir. "Imagine" had previously appeared at other Olympic ceremonies, including the 1996 Summer Olympics closing ceremony in Atlanta, the 2006 Winter Olympics opening ceremony in Torino, the 2012 Summer Olympics closing ceremony in London, the 2018 Winter Olympics opening ceremony in PyeongChang, and the 2024 Summer Olympics opening ceremony in Paris.

=== "Peace Through Sport" ===
Seiko Hashimoto, President of the Tokyo Organising Committee of the Olympic and Paralympic Games and Thomas Bach, IOC president, then gave speeches. Hashimoto briefly spoke about the Tokyo Olympics as an example of overcoming difficulties, as the pitch to host the Olympics was for it to form part of the rebuilding effort after the 2011 Tōhoku earthquake and tsunami. She also called for the Olympic Truce to be observed. Bach in his 13-minute speech, highlighted that the Olympic movement showed the unifying power of sport, and expressed his gratitude to healthcare workers, the volunteers and described participating refugee athletes as an enrichment for society. Both speeches were scheduled to last a combined total of nine minutes, but in the ceremony the segment took over twice as long.

The opening declaration of the 2020 Olympic Games, limited to a prescribed statement of around 17 words, laid down in the Olympic Charter, was made by Emperor Naruhito. He was the third Japanese Emperor to open an Olympics, following his grandfather Emperor Hirohito (1964 Summer and 1972 Winter Olympics) and his father Emperor Akihito (1998 Winter Olympics). He was also the honorary patron of Tokyo 2020 Olympic and Paralympics.

"私は、ここに、第32回近代オリンピアードを記念する、東京大会の開会を宣言します。" - "I hereby declare the opening of the Tokyo Games, commemorating the XXXII Modern Olympiad."

— His Majesty the Emperor Naruhito

After Naruhito declared the Games open, 288 fireworks were set off.

The Olympic Flag then entered the stadium. Many of the flag bearers were both athletes and front-line nurses, doctors and healthcare workers during the pandemic. The flag bearers were:

- Asia: Kento Momota, Badminton
- Oceania: Elena Galiabovitch, Shooter and Physician
- Americas: Paula Pareto, Judoka and Physician
- Africa: Mehdi Essadiq, Triathlon
- Europe: Paola Egonu, Volleyball
- IOC Refugee Olympic Team: Cyrille Tchatchet II, Weightlifter and Nurse

It was then handed to front line workers from Japan and was raised by the Japan Guard. The Olympic Anthem was sung in English by the choir composed of high school students from Tokyo and Fukushima.

Finally, while an English recording of Susan Boyle performing the Japanese folk song Tsubasa o Kudasai (Wings to Fly) played, doves were projected on the stadium floor, before thousands of paper doves fluttered into the stadium.

=== "Let the Games Begin" and "Time to Shine" ===
A video sequence showed the history of the Olympic pictograms had been introduced at the Olympic Games 1964 (also in Tokyo), followed by a live-action recreation of the 50 pictograms used for the events of this Olympic Games. Out of the 50 pictograms, 48 were acted out by the performers using camera angles and various props, some done live in the middle of the stadium, others in prerecorded segments additionally with hand gestures, finger tutting, studio lights, and karate gi. During one prerecorded segment, parts of the song "Camptown Races" could be briefly heard while the equestrian-related pictograms were recreated. The first pictogram shown, the one for the modern pentathlon, was initially depicted as a static image before the performer portraying the running figure moved out of place, setting up the nature of the performance, while the one for sailing was found printed on a propsman's shirt. The segment was directed by HIRO-PON (from Gamarjobat) and performed by GABEZ, with the segment being called "a funny, witty performance reminiscent of a typical Japanese TV game show" like Kasou Taishou.

Following this, a lighting technician played by the comedian Hitori Gekidan was seen on camera to switch on the lights for several Tokyo and national landmarks across Japan. Olympic champion and former figure skater Shizuka Arakawa was also involved in this sketch.

A performance by kabuki actor Ichikawa Ebizō XI, acting out an excerpt from Shibaraku, was accompanied by jazz pianist Hiromi Uehara, playing a rendition of a tune from her album Spectrum. The segment, "intended to dispel negative energy," symbolised the mixing of both traditional Japanese performing arts and the Japanese affection towards modern jazz.

=== "Hope Lights Our Way" ===
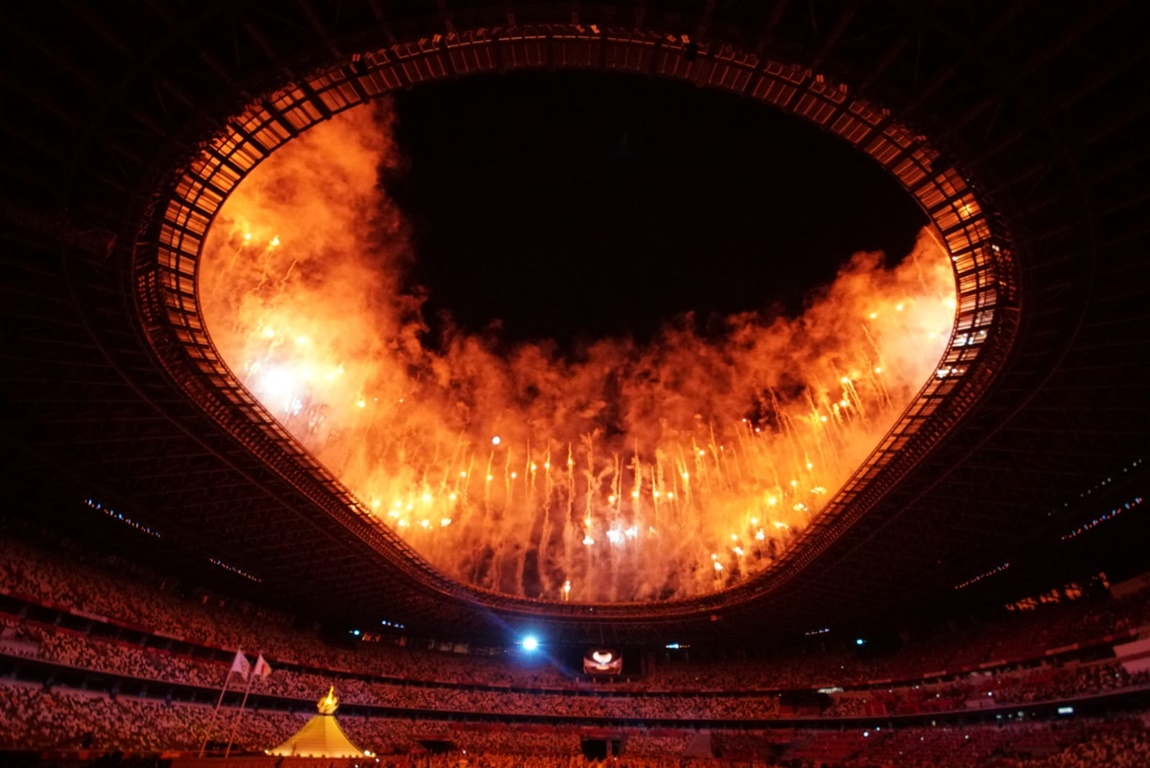
The flame, in the bottom right is lit, while fireworks were set off.

Before the flame arrived at the stadium, a recap video played showcasing the flame's journey across Japan featuring the song Teo Torriatte (Let Us Cling Together) performed by Queen. The flame was brought into the stadium at the end of the torch relay by wrestler Saori Yoshida and judoka Tadahiro Nomura. It was carried by a trio of Japanese baseball greats (Shigeo Nagashima, Sadaharu Oh, and Hideki "Godzilla" Matsui), a doctor and a nurse, paralympian Wakako Tsuchida, and a group of students from Iwate, Miyagi, and Fukushima prefectures who were born shortly before the 2011 Tōhoku earthquake and tsunami. Finally, Japanese tennis player Naomi Osaka carried it up the steps to light the Olympic cauldron; Osaka herself would compete for Japan in the Olympics before being eliminated in the third round of the women's tennis competition. Three hours later, the badminton player Ayaka Takahashi lit another cauldron, outside the stadium which was off-limits to guests.

In December 2018, organisers had stated that although the Olympic cauldron would be officially lit and extinguished at the stadium, the flame would be transferred to a separate, public cauldron (following the lead of the 2010 Winter Olympics in Vancouver and the 2016 Summer Olympics in Rio) at Ariake West Canal, on the Tokyo riverfront while the Games were in progress, and transferred back to Olympic Stadium for the closing ceremony. Organisers cited "physical difficulties" to keeping the flame at the New National Stadium due to the current Japanese legislation about fire effects use. Due to the state of emergency, the cauldron was off-limits to guests and situated outside the Olympic Stadium.

The cauldron was designed by Canadian-Japanese designer Oki Sato, who attended Waseda University, the same university as Yoshinori Sakai, the cauldron-lighter in 1964. The steps to reach the cauldron, symbolising Mount Fuji, were "designed to evoke the image of a blooming sakura flower."

The music featured in the cauldron lighting included Boléro by Maurice Ravel, "Rise of the Planet 9" from Dr. Copellius, composed by Isao Tomita, followed by the fireworks featuring the music of Takashi Yoshimatsu's Symphony No. 2 "At terra".

== Dignitaries in attendance ==
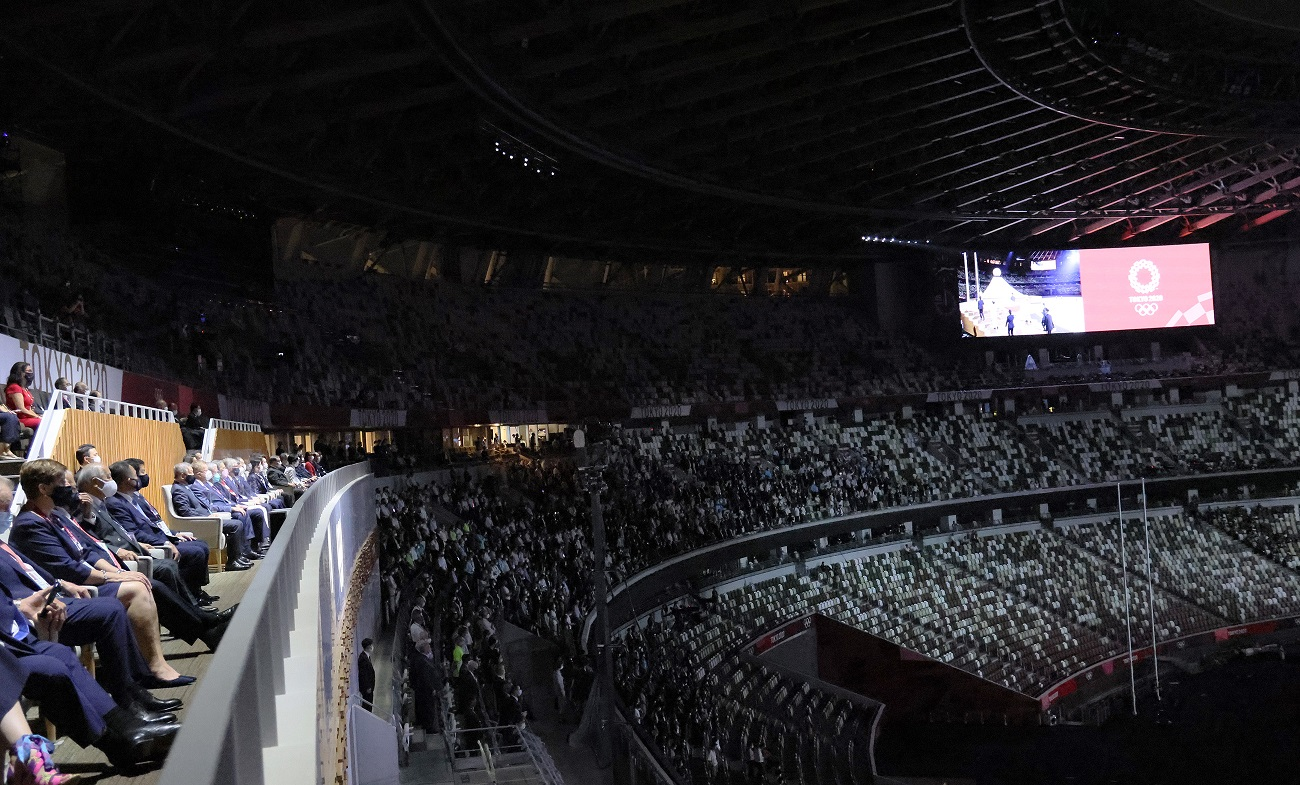
Compared to most Olympic Ceremonies, the number of dignitaries in attendance was much smaller than usual

Even though the stadium had normally had a capacity for 68,000 spectators, however only 800 foreign and 150 local officials, who were deemed "Games stakeholders", were in attendance, as well as 3,500 members of the media and 6,000 members of team delegations, totalling 10,400. Even though it is customary for Olympic sponsors to send corporate representatives as well, companies such as Toyota, Panasonic, Procter & Gamble, NEC, and Fujitsu, opted out of attending. A scoreboard in the stadium warned the attendees to "Clap, Do not sing or chant".

=== Host country dignitaries ===
- Japan
  - Emperor Naruhito
  - Prime Minister Yoshihide Suga
  - Governor of Tokyo Yuriko Koike
  - President of the Tokyo Organising Committee of the Olympic and Paralympic Games Seiko Hashimoto
  - Minister of State for the Tokyo Olympic and Paralympic Games Tamayo Marukawa
  - President of the Japanese Olympic Committee Yasuhiro Yamashita

=== Dignitaries from abroad ===
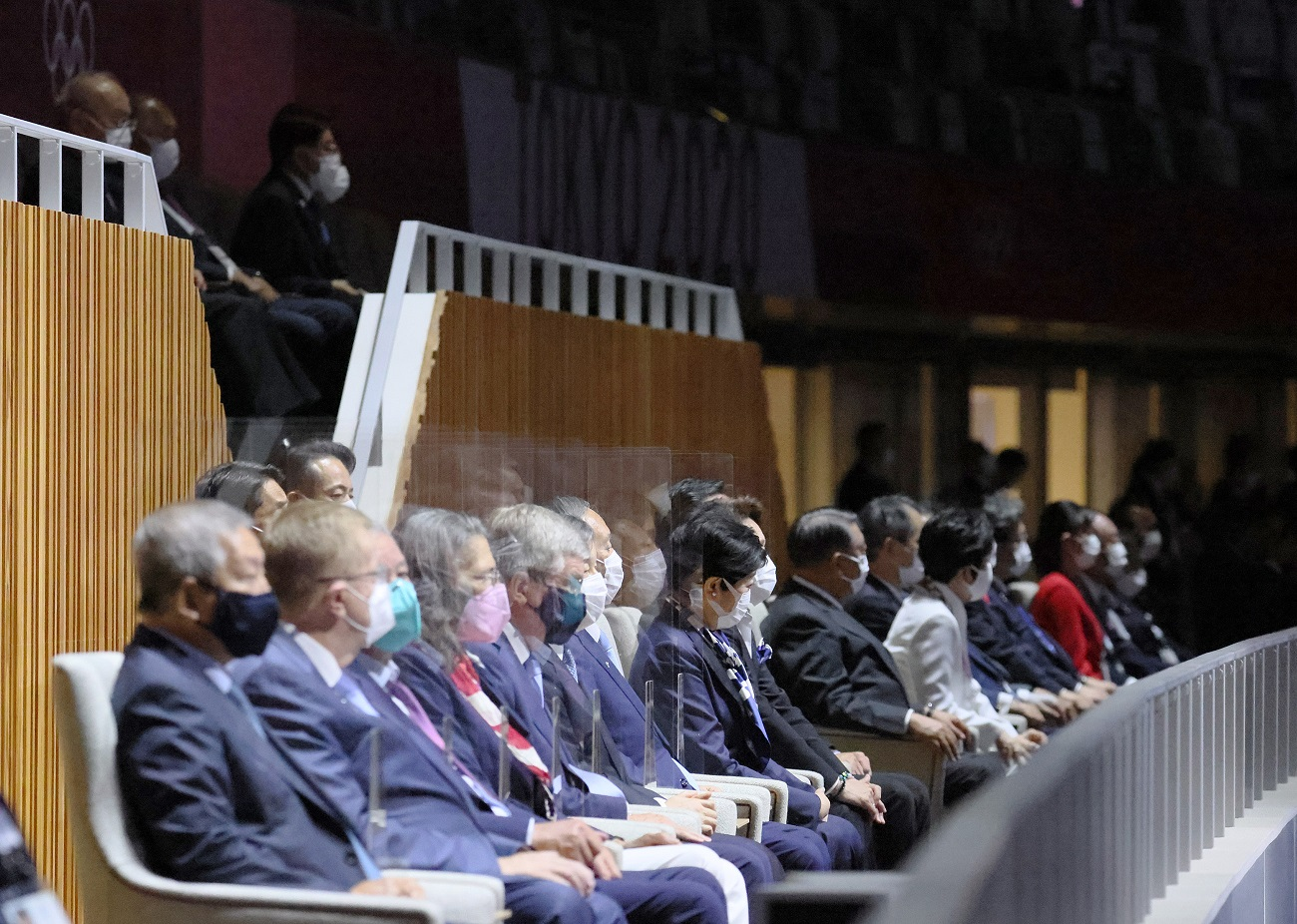
Dignitaries in attendance (at Japan National Stadium on 23 July 2021)

- Armenia – President Armen Sarksyan
- Australia – Minister for Sport Richard Colbeck and Queensland Premier Annastacia Palaszczuk (representing Queen Elizabeth II and Governor-General David Hurley, host country of the then-recently awarded 2032 Summer Olympics)
- Bulgaria – Minister of Youth and Sports Andrey Kuzmanov (representing President Rumen Radev)
- Canada – Minister of Employment, Workforce Development and Disability Inclusion Carla Qualtrough (representing the Queen Elizabeth II and Administrator of the Government of Canada Richard Wagner)
- China – Chinese Olympic Committee (COC) President Gou Zhongwen (representing President Xi Jinping, host country of the 2022 Winter Olympics)
- Croatia – Former president and member of the International Olympic Committee Kolinda Grabar-Kitarović
- Finland – Minister of Science and Culture Antti Kurvinen (representing President Sauli Niinistö)
- France – President Emmanuel Macron (host country of the 2024 Summer Olympics)
- Greece – Deputy Minister of Culture and Sport Lefteris Avgenakis (representing President Katerina Sakellaropoulou)
- India – Minister of Sports Anurag Thakur (representing President Ram Nath Kovind)
- Italy – Secretary for sports Valentina Vezzali (representing President Sergio Mattarella, host country of the 2026 Winter Olympics)
- Jordan – Prince Faisal bin Hussein (representing King Abdullah II)
- Kosovo – President Vjosa Osmani
- Lithuania – Vice Minister for Science, Education, and Sport Linas Obcarskas (representing President Gitanas Nauseda)
- Luxembourg – Grand Duke Henri
- Monaco – Sovereign Prince of Monaco Albert II
- Mongolia – Prime Minister Luvsannamsrain Oyun-Erdene
- Montenegro – Prime Minister Zdravko Krivokapić
- Poland – President Andrzej Duda
- San Marino – Captains Regent Gian Carlo Venturini and Marco Nicolini
- Singapore - Speaker of the Parliament Tan Chuan-Jin (representing President Halimah Yacob)
- Slovenia – Minister for Research, Education and Sport Simona Kustec (representing President Borut Pahor)
- South Korea – Minister of Culture, Sports and Tourism Hwang Hee (representing President Moon Jae-in, host country of the 2018 Winter Olympics)
- South Sudan – Fourth Vice President Rebecca Nyandeng De Mabior (representing President Salva Kiir)
- Switzerland – President Guy Parmelin
- Turkmenistan – Deputy Prime Minister Serdar Berdimukhamedov
- United Kingdom – Minister for Sport Nigel Huddleston (representing Queen Elizabeth II and Prime Minister Boris Johnson)
- United States – First Lady Jill Biden (representing President Joe Biden, host country of the 2028 Summer Olympics)

=== Dignitaries from International organizations ===
- International Olympic Committee
  - IOC President Thomas Bach and IOC members
  - Chair of the IOC Ethics Commission and Former Secretary-General of the United Nations Ban Ki-moon
  - IOC Vice-President Anita DeFrantz
- United Nations – High Commissioner for Refugees Filippo Grandi
- World Health Organization – Director-General Tedros Adhanom Ghebreyesus

== Anthems ==
- National Anthem of Japan – Misia
- Olympic Anthem – Fukushima Students' Choir

== Controversies ==
Outside the venue, protests opposing the Olympics being run during the COVID-19 pandemic was held in the southwestern corner of the stadium, timed to coincide with the ceremony. The protesters' chant, "Go to hell, IOC", could be heard by media inside the stadium during some of the quieter moments.

Another scandal involving musicians was the dismissal of Senegalese-born Japanese percussionist, Latyr Sy, allegedly due to the organizers' reluctance in having an "African" in the ceremony. He had been hired in May and had the rehearsal schedule sent to him in April, however, upon enquiring about signing his contract in May, he was informed that his inclusion in the program had been rejected due to his ethnicity. A spokesperson of the organising committee later gave background to Sy's claim saying, "We had planned a music part in which many singers would participate, but due to infectious disease control and budget, we cancelled the part itself. Therefore we cancelled the appearance of all the participants in the music part."

When Emperor Naruhito began the opening declaration, Prime Minister Yoshihide Suga and Governor of Tokyo Yuriko Koike remained seated, and only stood halfway through. On Japanese social media, some criticized their confusion as disrespectful to the Emperor. Governor Koike spoke later to press that she felt embarrassed standing up halfway through. The organizing committee later apologized for the wording at the end of Thomas Bach speech as he could not make an announcement in the stadium to encourage everyone to stand up before the Emperor spoke.

== Ceremony key team ==
- Tomoyuki Tanaka, musical director
- Gamarjobat's HIRO-PON, guest appearance
- Kei Shibata
- Kentarō Kobayashi, Opening Ceremony Director (Note: Fired by TOCOG due to insensitive jokes and bullying allegations, although the committee kept his program intact.)
- Mansai Nomura, adviser
- Yuichi Kodama, film director
- Akihiro Fukube
- Akihiro Hamabe
- Hiroshi Nakamura, assistant musical director
- Iguchi
- Junji Kojima, film director
- Keiji Wakabayashi
- Koichiro Tsujikawa, film director
- Marco Balich, senior adviser to the executive producer
- Marihiko Hara, composer
- Masayuki Kagei, composer
- Nami Tomizawa, set designer
- Noboru Tomizawa
- Piera Shepperd, senior adviser to the executive producer
- Seigen Tokuzawa, composer
- Shintaro Hirahara, director of choreography
- Takayuki Hioki, executive producer
- Takayuki Suzuki
- Takuji Higuchi, executive writer
- Toshihiko Sakura
- Tugihisa Tanaka
- Yohei Taneda, scenographer

Announcers

- Mai Shoji (English)
- Georges Veyssière (French)
- Hiroyuki Sekino (Japanese)

== Reception ==
The ceremony was panned as being solemn and muted in comparison to previous Olympic ceremonies, with the lack of audience due to the state of emergency being a factor in the atmosphere, to the point that British journalist Ian Dunt compared this fact as "attending a funeral". It was also largely panned for being too long and confusing. Japanese Entertainment writer Elizabeth Matsumoto was confused by some elements of the ceremony such as the Matsuri segment, questioning "why to focus on carpentry and if the tap dancing was necessary". Others criticized Bach's 13 minute speech where some athletes sat down during the segment.

Those who understood that the ceremony would be more muted, such as Jen Chaney from Vulture, opined that "while it was largely entertaining and showed the perseverance of the human spirit, it also showed the pessimism and difficulties of holding the Summer Olympics during a pandemic", summarizing the theme of the ceremony as asking the question "What exactly are we doing here, and why?"

Some did give positive reviews to the celebratory segments, including a segment featuring dancers re-creating the poses of the Games' pictograms. Some Japanese reviewers felt that Misia's performance of the Japanese Anthem was excellent and dignified given the difficulties of performing the anthem live. Others felt that the ceremony showed an unmistakably contemporary and diverse view of Japan, finishing with Osaka lighting the cauldron, who is biracial and was open when talking about controversial issues related to athletes' mental health as this question can affect their performances.

== Broadcasting ==
In Japan, public broadcaster NHK aired the opening ceremony in 8K with 22.2 surround sound and hybrid log-gamma (HLG) HDR. Despite wide opposition to the Olympics by residents, the opening ceremony was seen in Japan by at least 73.27 million viewers nationwide, with NHK peaking at a 61% audience share during a segment featuring Miki Maya and at the start of the parade of nations. CEO of Olympic Broadcasting Services (OBS) Yiannis Exarchos stated that the opening ceremony was the most-watched Japanese television broadcast in the last 10 years. Locally, it was reported that the opening ceremony had achieved a 56% audience share in the Kantō region, making it the most-watched television broadcast in the region since the opening ceremony of the 1964 Summer Olympics.

South Korean broadcaster MBC faced criticism for showing profiles of countries with insensitive or stereotypical facts and images during the parade of nations, such as Italy being represented by a picture of pizza, Portugal being represented by a picture of egg tarts, Romania represented by a picture of Dracula, Ukraine represented by a photo of the Chernobyl disaster, Syria's profile mentioning the Syrian civil war, and Haiti described as having an "unstable political situation due to the assassination of the president". MBC CEO Park Sung-jae apologized for the imagery, stating that the network had "damaged the Olympic values of friendship, solidarity and harmony" with the images, which had been intended to help viewers identify the countries.

In the United States, NBC announced that it would broadcast and stream the opening ceremony live in all time zones, (6:55 a.m. Eastern/3:55 a.m. Pacific) in addition to its traditional tape-delayed prime time broadcasts. With a reported 17 million viewers, ratings declined 36% over the 2016 opening ceremony, while streaming viewers were up by 76%.

In Canada, in addition to the main English and French-language broadcasts on CBC Television and Ici Radio-Canada Télé, CBC/Radio-Canada simulcasted the opening ceremony with streaming broadcasts in 8 Indigenous languages: East Cree, Dehcho Dene, Dënësųłinë́ Yałtı, Gwichʼin, Inuktitut, Inuvialuktun, Sahtu Dene and Tłı̨chǫ.

== See also ==
- 2020 Summer Olympics cauldron
- 2020 Summer Olympics closing ceremony
- 2020 Summer Paralympics opening ceremony
- 2020 Summer Paralympics closing ceremony
