= Giovanni Ficarra =

Italian rower (born 1996)

Personal information
- Born: 18 June 1996 (age 30) Messina, Italy

Sport
- Country: Italy
- Sport: Rowing
- Club: Pelororow
Medal record
World Championships
Gold medal – first place	2021 Oieras	C1x
Gold medal – first place	2022 Račice	Lightweight coxless pair
Gold medal – first place	2023 Toronto	500m LW Indoor Rowing Championships
World U23 Championships
Gold medal – first place	2015 Plovdiv	Lightweight coxless pair
Gold medal – first place	2017 Plovdiv	Lightweight coxless four
Mediterranean Beach Games
Silver medal – second place	2023 Heraklion	Single sculls
Silver medal – second place	2023 Heraklion	Mixed relay

Giovanni Ficarra (born 18 June 1996) is an Italian rower who won a gold medal at the 2022 World Rowing Championships.

== Sports career ==
He was the first rower in the world to win the "Triple Crown", i.e. the conquest of a podium in each of the three rowing world championships: traditional rowing. indoor rowing and beach sprint rowing.

== Academic career ==
He earned his bachelor's degree in Sports Science from Pegaso University (Italy) in 2018. In 2020, he graduated with honors with a master's degree in Science and Techniques of Preventive and Adapted Physical Activities from the University of Messina.

In 2024, he completed a PhD in Translational Molecular Medicine and Surgery at the University of Messina. In 2022-2023 he spent one semester as a visiting researcher with Professor Joseph Grima's group at the University of Malta working on biomechanics. He is currently working as a post-doctoral researcher with the University of Messina.
