= 2023 Mediterranean Beach Games =

Multi-sport event in Greece

III Mediterranean Beach Games
- Nations: 26
- Athletes: 1500
- Events: 54 in 13 sports
- Opening: 9 September 2023
- Closing: 16 September 2023
- Opened by: Giannis Vroutsis; Alternate Minister for Sport
- Ceremony venue: Karteros Beach Sports Center
- Website: https://heraklion23.gr/

The 2023 Mediterranean Beach Games (MBG) (Greek: Μεσογειακοί Παράκτιοι Αγώνες 2023) was the third edition of the Mediterranean Beach Games. It was held from 9 to 16 September 2023 in Heraklion, Greece. The MBG are celebrated every four years bringing together the athletes of the Mediterranean Olympic Committees, members of the International Committee of Mediterranean Games (CIJM), from three continents: Africa, Asia and Europe.

== Host city selection ==
The Greek city of Heraklion was elected as host city of the third edition of the Mediterranean Beach Games (2023) during the ordinary General Assembly of the CIJM which was held in 2021 via Zoom Video Communications meeting.

== Mascots ==
The games had two mascots, Ariadne and Minotaur. The final versions of the mascots were selected by an online vote with more than 7,700 participants.

== Nations ==
https://heraklion23.microplustimingservices.com/#/nations-selection

Participating National Committees
- Albania (5)
- Algeria ()
- Andorra ()
- Bosnia and Herzegovina ()
- Croatia ()
- Cyprus ()
- Egypt ()
- France ()
- Greece ()
- Italy ()
- Kosovo ()
- Lebanon ()
- Libya ()
- Malta ()
- Monaco ()
- Montenegro ()
- Morocco ()
- North Macedonia ()
- Portugal ()
- San Marino ()
- Serbia ()
- Slovenia ()
- Spain ()
- Syria ()
- Tunisia ()
- Turkey ()

== Medal table ==
* Host nation (Greece)

Rank	Nation	Gold	Silver	Bronze	Total
1	Italy	13	16	13	42
2	Greece*	13	10	10	33
3	Spain	12	2	6	20
4	France	7	11	6	24
5	Egypt	4	2	3	9
6	Croatia	2	3	6	11
7	Turkey	1	2	1	4
8	Tunisia	1	0	4	5
9	Syria	1	0	0	1
10	Portugal	0	4	3	7
11	Algeria	0	2	0	2
12	Morocco	0	1	2	3
13	Slovenia	0	1	1	2
14	Cyprus	0	0	1	1
Totals (14 entries)		54	54	56	164

== Sports ==
- 3x3 basketball (2)
- Beach handball (2)
- Beach soccer (1)
- Beach tennis (3)
- Beach volleyball (2)
- Beach wrestling (7)
- Canoeing (2)
- Finswimming (21)
- Karate (2)
- Kiteboarding (2)
- Open water swimming (2)
- Rowing (5)
- Triathle (3)

== Medalists ==
=== 3×3 basketball ===
Event	Gold	Silver	Bronze
Men	Greece; Dimitrios Barmpas; Ilias Petridis; Georgios Kalianiotis; Vasileios Zarkadoulas	Croatia; Luka Jurički; Borna Antolić; Roko Sedlar; Jakov Jacović	Slovenia; Martin Gerbec; Matevž Žižmond; Elmir Haskič; Jaka Oberlajt
Women	Greece; Ioanna Chatzivasileiou; Zoi Korre; Eleftheria Mangina; Christina Anastasopoulou	Slovenia; Tiana Meglič Šteharnik; Eliza Pintar; Zala Pavlič; Yeisy Alexandra Perez	Croatia; Ivana Ujević; Nina Prnjak; Nikolina Dujić; Marija Soldo

=== Beach handball ===
Event	Gold	Silver	Bronze
Men	Croatia; Jan Terihaj; Tomislav Lauš; Antonio Fabek; Ivan Jurić; Filip Mlinarić; Fran Cvjetičanin; Noa Klarić; Matej Jakeljić; Sebastian Lučić; Stjepan Babić	Italy; Ivan Ilic; Thomas Postogna; Luigi Arena; Nicolas Balogh Sedda; Alessio D'Attis; Gregorio Mazzanti; Nicolas Dieguez; Davide Notarangelo; Marco Beltrami; Christian Mitterrutzner	Spain; Carlos Donderis Vegas; Elhji Touré Jabby; Antoine Miranda Sirvent; Pablo Martín Ruiz; Sergio Venegas Rodríguez; Adriá Ortolá López; Carlos González Cobo; Adrián Hidalgo Torrecilla; Javier Delgado Sánchez
Women	Spain; Mónica Cámara Heras; Asunción Batista Portero; Remei Prat Riera; Míriam Sempere Agulló; Sara Hernández Torrico; Alba Díaz González; Paula Quiles Vera; Violeta González Poudereux; Malena Díaz Coppens; Gemma Sánchez Florentino	Greece; Magdalini Kepesidou; Eleni Poimenidou; Agni Papadopoulou; Anna Kaloidi; Eleni Mournou; Melpomeni Nikolaou; Eleftheria Trochidou; Magdalini Koukmisi; Nikolina Kepesidou; Elisavet Mastaka	Portugal; Sofia Goncalves; Joana Delgado; Helena Corro; Daniela Mendes; Maria Marques; Catarina Oliveira; Sofia Alexandra Rego; Sara Inês Pinho; Catarina Teixeira; Maria Antunes

=== Beach tennis ===
Event	Gold	Silver	Bronze
Men's doubles	France; Nicolas Gianotti; Mathieu Guegano	Spain; Antonio Ramos; Gerard Rodríguez	Italy; Doriano Beccaccioli; Tommaso Giovannini
Women's doubles	Italy; Flaminia Daina; Nicole Nobile	France; Claude Hoarau; Mathilde Hoarau	Spain; Ariadna Costa; Eva Fernández
Mixed doubles	Italy; Giulia Gasparri; Doriano Beccaccioli	Italy; Nicole Nobile; Diego Bollettinari	Spain; Eva Fernández; Antonio Ramos

=== Beach volleyball ===
Event	Gold	Silver	Bronze
Men	France; Quincy Ayé; Calvin Ayé	Italy; Davide Benzi; Carlo Bonifazi	Portugal; João Pedrosa; Hugo Campos
Women	Italy; Reka Orsi Toth; Giada Bianchi	Italy; Margherita Bianchin; Claudia Scampoli	France; Clémence Vieira; Aline Chamereau

=== Beach wrestling ===
Event	Gold	Silver	Bronze
Men's 70 kg	Quentin Sticker; France	Niko Arouzmanidis; Greece	Khaier Eddine Ben Tlil; Tunisia
Men's 80 kg	Christos Christoforidis; Greece	Chawki Doulache; Algeria	Gabriele Doro; Italy
Men's 90 kg	Christos Samartsidis; Greece	Angelos Kouklaris; Greece	Tomislav Hader; Croatia
Men's +90 kg	Omar Sarem; Syria	Apostolos Panagiotis Tsiovolos; Greece	Achilleas Chrysidis; Greece
Women's 60 kg	Francesca Indelicato; Italy	Chaimaa Aouissi; Algeria	Victoria Baez; Spain
Women's 70 kg	Lydia Pérez Touriño; Spain	Manon Kury; France	Lygeri Athanasia Voulgari; Greece
Women's +70 kg	Stefania Zacheila; Greece	Aikaterini Eirini Pitsiava; Greece	Angélique Gonzalez; France

=== Canoe ocean racing ===
Event	Gold	Silver	Bronze
Men's 10 km	Walter Bouzán; Spain	Bernardo Pereira; Portugal	Hector Hénot; France
Women's 10 km	Judit Vergés; Spain	Thaïs Delrieux; France	Amaia Osaba; Spain

=== Finswimming ===
Men

Event	Gold	Silver	Bronze
50 m apnea	Georgios Panagiotidis; Greece	Ömer Faruk Saydam; Turkey	Georgios Kaltsoukalas; Greece
50 m bi-fins	Patrick Martin; Italy	Riccardo Romano; Italy	Youssef Neffati; Tunisia
100 m bi-fins	Youssef Neffati; Tunisia	Riccardo Romano; Italy	Patrick Martin; Italy
200 m bi-fins	Ognjen Marić; Croatia	Sébastien Chédru; France	Ahmed Radwan; Egypt
100 m surface	Georgios Panagiotidis; Greece	Georgios Kaltsoukalas; Greece	Seifeldin Abdelrahman; Egypt
200 m surface	Derin Toparlak; Turkey	Colas Zugmeyer; France	Lorenzo Caronno; Italy
400 m surface	Ilias Kalfidis; Greece	Derin Toparlak; Turkey	Lorenzo Caronno; Italy
Open water 2 km bi-fins	Marwan El-Amrawy; Egypt	Ahmed Radwan; Egypt	Georgios Mantzakos; Greece
Open water 4 km surface	Marios Armoutsis; Greece	Ilias Kalfidis; Greece	Davide De Ceglie; Italy

Women

Event	Gold	Silver	Bronze
50 m apnea	Vasileia Tsigkoia; Greece	Dora Bassi; Croatia	Anaïs Verger; France
50 m bi-fins	Viola Magoga; Italy	Georgia Peraki; Greece	Lydia Panteloglou; Greece
100 m bi-fins	Georgia Peraki; Greece	Login Aboulrous; Egypt	Viola Magoga; Italy
200 m bi-fins	Login Aboulrous; Egypt	Silvia Belli; Italy	Giolanda Kaperda; Greece
100 m surface	Vasileia Tsigkoia; Greece	Giorgia Destefani; Italy	Dora Bassi; Croatia
200 m surface	Silvia Sevignani; Italy	Giorgia Destefani; Italy	Ifigeneia Teliousi; Greece
400 m surface	Silvia Sevignani; Italy	Athanasia Karatsivi; Greece	Adasu Ramazanoğlu; Turkey
Open water 2 km bi-fins	Silvia Belli; Italy	Sonia Fargas; Spain	Sarra Ben Ahmed; Tunisia
Open water 4 km surface	Gamila Hassan; Egypt	Mara Zaghet; Italy	Sofia Anastasia Tsianou; Greece

Mixed

Event	Gold	Silver	Bronze
4 × 50 m bi-fins	Italy; Riccardo Romano; Giorgia Destefani; Patrick Martin; Viola Magoga	France; Théo De Zaldivar; Émilie Fatras; Charles Salsano; Anaïs Verger; Sébastien Chédru; Oriane Robisson; Vincent Prudhomme; Pauline Gérard	Croatia; Filip Strikinac; Dora Bassi; Ognjen Marić; Gloria Galić; Nikola Đurđević
4 × 100 m surface	Greece; Georgios Panagiotidis; Ifigeneia Teliousi; Georgios Kaltsoukalas; Vasileia Tsigkoia	France; Colas Zugmeyer; Oriane Robisson; Hugo Meyer; Anaïs Verger	Italy; Guglielmo Alicicco; Valentina Crivello; Stefano Figini; Giorgia Destefani
Open water 4 × 2 km surface	Egypt; Mahmoud Ali; Nada Hagrass; Ibrahim Youssef; Gamila Hassan	Greece; Marios Armoutsis; Athanasia Karatsivi; Ilias Kalfidis; Sofia Anastasia Tsianou	Italy; Davide De Ceglie; Silvia Sevignani; Lorenzo Caronno; Mara Zaghet

=== Karate beach kata ===
Event	Gold	Silver	Bronze
Men's individual	Raúl Martín; Spain	Salah Eddine El Mansoury; Morocco	Guido Polsinelli; Italy
Men's individual	Raúl Martín; Spain	Salah Eddine El Mansoury; Morocco	Damián Quintero; Spain
Women's individual	Paola García; Spain	Orsola D'Onofrio; Italy	Sanae Agalmam; Morocco
Women's individual	Paola García; Spain	Orsola D'Onofrio; Italy	Georgia Archontia Xenou; Greece

=== Kiteboarding ===
Event	Gold	Silver	Bronze
Men's Formula Kite	Maxime Nocher; France	Axel Mazella; France	Denis Taradin; Cyprus
Women's Formula Kite	Poema Newland; France	Lauriane Nolot; France	Tiana Laporte; Italy

=== Open water swimming ===
Event	Gold	Silver	Bronze
Men's 5 km	Marcello Guidi; Italy	Dario Verani; Italy	Tiago Campos; Portugal
Women's 5 km	Arianna Bridi; Italy	Mafalda Rosa; Portugal	Silvia Ciccarella; Italy

=== Rowing beach sprint ===
Event	Gold	Silver	Bronze
Men's single sculls	Miguel Salas; Spain	Giovanni Ficarra; Italy	Vincent Noirot; France
Men's double sculls	Spain; Ander Martín; Adrian Miramon	France; Ivan Bové; Ludovic Dubuis	Croatia; Nickol Udovičić; Nino Varat
Women's single sculls	Celia de Miguel; Spain	Élodie Ravera-Scaramozzino; France	Khadija Krimi; Tunisia
Women's double sculls	Spain; Ainhoa Casanova; Nadia Felipe	Croatia; Paola Girotto; Martina Kaić	Italy; Silvia Tripi; Viola Patrignani
Mixed relay	Spain; Ander Martín; Adrian Miramon; María Ángeles Purcarea; Celia de Miguel; Nadia Felipe; Carlos González	Italy; Angelo D'Amico; Mario Pietro Zerilli; Annalisa Cozzarini; Silvia Tripi; Viola Patrignani; Giovanni Ficarra	Croatia; Nino Varat; Nickol Udovičić; Sara Žuvanić; Martina Kaić; Paola Girotto; Lovre Puh

=== Triathle ===
Event	Gold	Silver	Bronze
Men's individual	Emanuele Tromboni; Italy	Duarte Taleigo; Portugal	Nikolas Papadimitriou; Greece
Women's individual	Clémence Reboisson; France	Alice Rinaudo; Italy	Léa Fernandez; France
Mixed relay	France; Léa Fernandez; Ugo Fleurot	Italy; Alice Rinaudo; Emanuele Tromboni	Egypt; Habiba Ramadan; Youssef Amer

== Results ==
1. https://heraklion23.microplustimingservices.com/#/general-schedule
2. https://heraklion23.microplustimingservices.com/#/results-books

== Results Books ==
1. https://heraklion23-pdf.microplustimingservices.com/MBG2023/BK3/ResultBook/MBG2023_BK3_v1.0.pdf
2. https://heraklion23-pdf.microplustimingservices.com/MBG2023/HBB/ResultBook/MBG2023_HBB_v1.0.pdf
3. https://heraklion23-pdf.microplustimingservices.com/MBG2023/BCS/ResultBook/MBG2023_BCS_v1.0.pdf
4. https://heraklion23-pdf.microplustimingservices.com/MBG2023/VBV/ResultBook/MBG2023_VBV_v1.0.pdf
5. https://heraklion23-pdf.microplustimingservices.com/MBG2023/WRB/ResultBook/MBG2023_WRB_v1.0.pdf
6. https://heraklion23-pdf.microplustimingservices.com/MBG2023/COR/ResultBook/MBG2023_COR_v1.0.pdf
7. https://heraklion23-pdf.microplustimingservices.com/MBG2023/KTE/ResultBook/MBG2023_KTE_v1.0.pdf
8. https://heraklion23-pdf.microplustimingservices.com/MBG2023/KBD/ResultBook/MBG2023_KBD_v1.0.pdf
9. https://heraklion23-pdf.microplustimingservices.com/MBG2023/OWS/ResultBook/MBG2023_OWS_v1.0.pdf
10. https://heraklion23-pdf.microplustimingservices.com/MBG2023/ROB/ResultBook/MBG2023_ROB_v1.0.pdf
11. https://heraklion23-pdf.microplustimingservices.com/MBG2023/TRA/ResultBook/MBG2023_TRA_v1.0.pdf
12. https://heraklion23-pdf.microplustimingservices.com/MBG2023/BTE/ResultBook/MBG2023_BTE_v1.1.pdf
13. https://heraklion23-pdf.microplustimingservices.com/MBG2023/FSW/ResultBook/MBG2023_FSW_v1.0.pdf
