= Mohamad Maso =

Syrian triathlete (born 1993)

Mo Maso
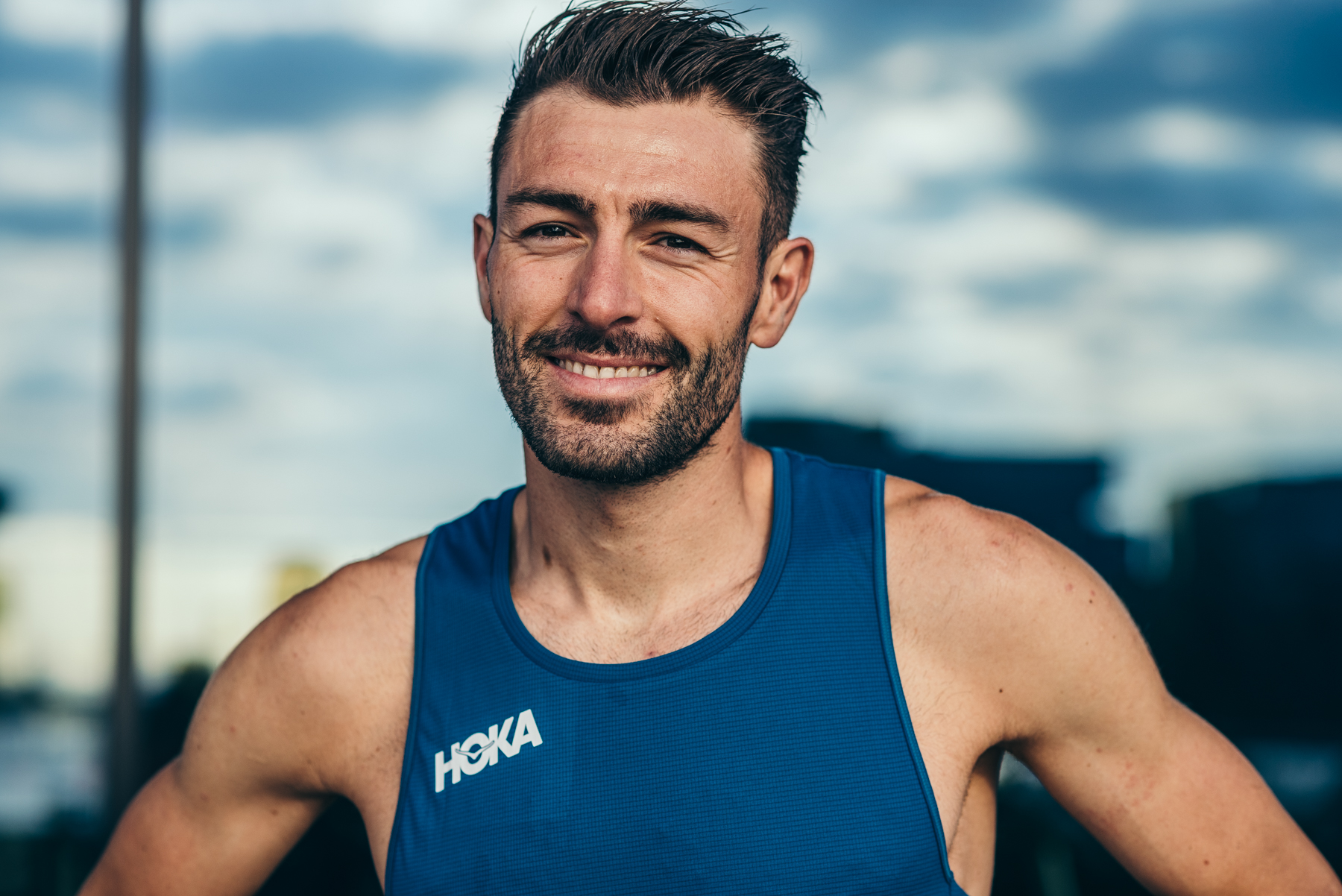

Personal information
- Full name: Mohamad Maso
- Nationality: Syrian
- Born: 23 July 1993 (age 32) Aleppo, Syria

Sport
- Sport: Triathlon
Medal record
Men's aquathlon
Representing Syria
Mediterranean Beach Games
| Bronze medal – third place | 2019 Patras | Individual |

Mohamad Maso (Arabic: محمد ماسو; born 23 July 1993) is a Syrian triathlete. He competed in the men's event at the 2020 Summer Olympics. During the opening ceremony, he was reunited with his brother, Alaa, who represented the IOC Refugee Olympic Team. Having fled their native country in 2015 during the war in Syria, both brothers finally settled in Germany.

== Life and career ==
Due to the war in Syria, Mohamad and his younger brother Alaa, a competition swimmer, were forced to leave their home town of Aleppo in northern Syria in 2015, and finally arrived in Germany.

Soon after his arrival, Maso started training again. Among other international sports competitions, he participated in the Asian Games in Indonesia in 2018, the 2019 Asia Triathlon Championships in South Korea, and in the same year, in the Asian Championships in Japan. Competing for the team of the Syrian Arab Republic, he participated in the 2020 Summer Olympics in Tokyo, where his brother Alaa was part of the Refugee Olympic Team. A picture showing the brothers hugging each other during the Parade of Nations in the opening ceremony was widely shared on social media.

In the early 2020s, Maso continued to compete in international triathlon championships.
