= Gamarjobat =

Japanese comedy duo

Gamarjobat (Japanese: が〜まるちょば) is a comedy performance group consisting of the Japanese comedians HIRO-PON — who sports a yellow mohawk — and Ketch! — with a red mohawk. They perform a variety of sketches, including mimes and physical comedy. However, Ketch left the group in 2019.

Ketch was born in Shizuoka near Mount Fuji and HIRO-PON (Hiroshi Yoshimi) was born in a suburb near Tokyo, attended school at the Tokyo Mime Theatre in Shinibu, and the Tokyo Mime Institute in Maniki.

They have found success performing in the United Kingdom, amongst other countries, winning awards and continuing to make frequent appearances at the Edinburgh Festival Fringe.

They have also appeared on UK TV programmes as Blue Peter, and children's talent show The Slammer, in which they were voted by the audience as the winning act in the first episode of the second series. In February 2009, the BBC broadcast a TV pilot Ketch & HIRO-PON Get It On. In 2007, at the Brighton Festival Fringe, they mentioned that "Gamarjobat" (გამარჯობათ) means hello in Georgian.

In February 2011, they made an appearance on the Friday night ITV show Comedy Rocks with Jason Manford.

As of 2019 Ketch withdrew from the group leaving HIRO-PON as the only sole member before a management change in 2020.

== TV ==
- 2009 - Ketch & HIRO-PON Get It On, BBC
- 2011 - Comedy Rocks, ITV
- 2012 - Festival Marrakech du rire, M6
- 2013 - La France a un incroyable talent, M6
- 2016 - Tonight at the London Palladium, ITV
- 2021 - 2020 Summer Olympics opening ceremony
