= Lisa Caussin-Battaglia =

Monegasque jet ski racer and powerboat pilot

Personal information
- Nationality: Monegasque
- Born: 16 October 1994 (age 32) Monaco
- Relatives: Gérard Battaglia (grandfather); Coline Caussin-Battaglia (sister)

Sport
- Sport: Jet ski racing; sailing; powerboat racing
- Coached by: Michel Torre

Lisa Caussin-Battaglia (born 16 October 1994) is a Monegasque jet ski racer, sailor and electric powerboat pilot. She took up stand-up jet ski racing at the age of 16 through a youth programme in Monaco, and has since competed in International Jet Sports Boating Association (IJSBA) and Union Internationale Motonautique (UIM) world and European championships. She was runner-up at the jet ski World Cup in 2015 and 2021. In 2026, racing a seated runabout for the first time, she won the women's Runabout 1100 category at the World Cup Mohammed VI in Agadir, Morocco, becoming the first a Monegasque competitor in closed-course runabout racing to achieve a podium finsh..

Caussin-Battaglia also represented Monaco at the 2018 Mediterranean Games and has said that she aims to qualify for the Olympic Games. In 2024, she raced for the Team Blue Rising in the inaugural season of the E1 Series electric raceboat championship. In 2026 she spoke publicly about experiencing depression and anxiety linked to the pressure of competition.

== Early life ==
Lisa Caussin-Battaglia was born in Monaco on 16 October 1994, and grew up in the Larvotto district. As a youth, she played violin and cello, and considered applying to a circus and street-arts school in Paris after her Baccalauréat.

== Jet ski career ==
=== Early career to 2021 ===
She discovered stand-up jet ski racing at 16 through Monaco's Passeport Culture programme, and initially participated recreationally. In her early races, she was often the only woman competing in mixed fields.

Caussin-Battaglia began racing with the Roca Jet Club in Monaco, coached by Michel Torre. She finished as runner-up at the 2015 jet ski World Cup in Doncaster Doncaster.

By early 2016, she had become regional Grand Sud champion in stand-up jet ski and placed eighth at the European Championships. She placed third in the French Championship and second in the French Championship slalom competition that year.

In 2019, having completed her studies, Caussin-Battaglia focused on jet skiing. That year, she contested the European Championship for the first time, alongside competing in the World Championship. She finished seventh at the opening European round in Penafiel, Portugal, and tenth at the World Championship round in Portimão. She then placed seventh at the world round in Olbia, Italy. At the European round in Nyíregyháza, Hungary, she finished sixth. In July, she placed fourth at the UIM-Aquabike European Championships in Croatia. A few days later, she finished runner-up in the mixed category at the International Jet Sports Boating Association European Championships. After finishing eighth at the grand prix in Qingdao, China, in October, she was seventh in the World Championship standings.

She finished fourth in the Union Internationale Motonautique Aquabike World Championship in 2020, and was ranked second in the UIM world rankings. In 2021, she finished fifth in both the UIM World and European Championships. She was World Cup runner-up that year, for the second time in her career.

=== 2022 and 2023 ===
Her 2022 season began with mechanical problems, as she was racing machines that were about five years old. At the same time, she was struggling to find sponsors. At the opening round of the UIM World Championship in Ibiza, she finished seventh in the GP1 Ladies class. She received funding from the Fondation Flaujac and the Segond Automobiles group. That year, she contested all three rounds of the World Cup, as the IJSBA Jet Ski World Series is also known, for the first time.

Racing for MT Racing Monaco in the IJSBA World Series, she finished third in the Pro-Am Women Ski Stock class at the opening round in Poland. At the Lake Havasu round in the United States in October, she experienced ankle and calf injuries following a collision. Despite the injury, she kept her provisional third place in the women's standings. Accompanied by her coach, she returned for the season finale in Pattaya, Thailand, where she finished tenth in the men's category and secured third place overall in the women's competition. Twenty-five women from twelve different countries competed during the season.

In June 2023, she won the women's title at the EuroFinals and finished second in the open category. In October that year, she finished second in the Amateur Women Ski Stock class at the IJSBA World Finals, scoring 166 points. She finished second overall in the same class in the 2023 World Series, behind Finland's Siiri Salonen. In an interview after the season, she attributed missing out on the title to recurring mechanical problems.

=== 2026 ===
In February 2026, at the World Cup Mohammed VI in Agadir, Morocco, Caussin-Battaglia competed on a seated runabout for the first time, after her usual stand-up machine broke down. She won the women's Runabout 1100 category, finished second in the mixed Runabout 1100 category, and placed seventh in endurance as the highest-placed woman among eighteen riders. It was the first podium finish by a Monegasque competitor in the discipline.

Later that month, at the invitation of the Australian team Eight1Racing, which lent her its machines, she competed in the Oceania continental championship on the Gold Coast. She won three of the four races in the Women Ski Stock class but finished second overall. She also placed second overall in the GP Women class. After her flight home was cancelled, she raced the following weekend at Newcastle. There, she won races in both the men's Pro-Am Ski Stock and GP Women classes and finished second overall.

== Sailing and E1 boat racing ==
Caussin-Battaglia competed for Monaco in sailing at the 2018 Mediterranean Games in Tarragona after gaining only around 100 hours of sailing experience, finishing eleventh of twelve. In 2022, she chose to miss the European jet ski championships in the hope of being selected again for the 2022 Mediterranean Games. She trains for jet ski and sailing together, and has said that her goal is qualifying for the Olympic Games.

In mid-2023, Caussin-Battaglia applied to be a pilot in the E1 Series, and was accepted to join the UIM E1 Pilot Academy.

After passing boat-handling and immersion tests, she drove the series' RaceBird boat for the first time and recorded competitive times despite having no previous experience of boat racing. Approached by two teams, she signed with Team Blue Rising, a UAE-based team co-owned by the Indian cricketer Virat Kohli and the entrepreneur Adi K. Mishra. In December 2023, the team announced her as its first official pilot for the inaugural season of the championship.

At the season opener in Jeddah in February 2024, she and teammate Phelim Kavanagh experienced technical problems but made the final and finished fourth. She became the first Monegasque woman to be an official pilot in an electric boat world championship. After the first three rounds, in which the team recorded two fourth places and an eighth place, she raced at the Monaco round in July 2024 as the only Monegasque pilot in the series, which was her first home race in any of her sports. Team Blue Rising finished fifth there. At the Lake Como round in August, she raced alongside Jonas Peeters and they finished eighth. This was the last race of the season. Team Blue Rising finished the competition in seventh place of the nine teams. Peeters and racing car driver Sara Misir were announced as the members of Team Blue Rising for the 2025 season.

== Personal life and other activities ==
In February 2026, Caussin-Battaglia spoke about experiencing depression and anxiety from competitive pressure, saying that she had been having anxiety attacks for the preceding three years. She said after the Mohammed VI World Cup that it was the first time in three years that she had competed with a feeling of freedom, and added "Peu importait le résultat, il s'agissait de reprendre du plaisir" ("No matter the result, it was about having fun again"). Later that year, she compared racing on a jet ski to dancing: "When you are on the jet ski, you are not on the jet ski. You are with the jet ski. It's like a dance."

She undertakes the preparation and maintenance of her jet ski herself. Her training includes strength work, aerobic exercise, and endurance training, and her regime includes cycling, skiing, and athletics. She has worked as a commentator for TV Monaco and spoken at conferences on women's sport. In 2024, Caussin-Battaglia and Camille Lopez, a consultant in maritime energy transition, were among eleven teams selected for the third edition of Pangaea X, a non-profit incubator for young people's environmental projects founded by the explorer Mike Horn. Their project, called Concrete Learning, aimed to develop a digital platform for sustainable products and practices for recreational and competitive boaters and organisations. In February 2026, she was preparing introductory jet ski sessions for young people, particularly young women, with Monaco Team Powersports.

Caussin-Battaglia's grandfather, Gérard Battaglia, represented Monaco in sailing at the 1960 Summer Olympics and the 1976 Summer Olympics. Her sister, Coline Caussin-Battaglia, is a rower who has represented Monaco internationally. Coline also competed in jet ski as a teenager.
