= Arisa Tsubata =

Japanese boxer (born 1993)

Personal information
- Born: 9 June 1993 (age 33) Tokorozawa, Saitama, Japan
- Height: 171 cm (5 ft 7 in)
- Weight: Middleweight

Boxing career

Arisa Tsubata (Japanese: 津端ありさ, Hepburn: Tsubata Arisa; born 9 June 1993) (Note: Sometimes written as "津幡ありさ", possibly because of confusion with the town of Tsubata (Japanese: 津幡).) is a Japanese amateur boxer and nurse. After entering the sport in 2018, she won the 2019 Japanese national boxing championship in the middleweight category. Tsubata then garnered worldwide attention for her performance in the 2020 Summer Olympics opening ceremony.

== Biography ==
Tsubata was born on 9 June 1993 to a Tahitian mother and a Japanese father. Her parents later split, with her father, Joji, taking custody over her and her three siblings. He encouraged Tsubata to take up nursing as a way to gain "life-long skills". She went to vocation school before becoming a nurse at Nishi Saitama Chuo Hospital in Tokorozawa, Saitama. She started boxing in 2018 to lose weight, but her prowess was noticed by her coaches, and they encouraged her to compete on a more formal basis. After defeating her only competitor, she won the women's middleweight title at the Japan national boxing championship. In January 2020, she fought her first international match in a Kazakh training camp, which she lost and later said showed her she needed to gain more experience.

=== 2020 Olympics and the COVID-19 pandemic ===
Tsubata set her sights on the 2020 Summer Olympics, first going to the 2020 Asia & Oceania Boxing Olympic Qualification Tournament in March 2020, where she lost and exited in the first round. Upon returning home, she went back to the hospital to respond to the COVID-19 pandemic in Japan, maintaining her training, now in a socially distanced manner, while working day and night shifts as a nurse. Her previous losses led the Japanese boxing officials to deem her too inexperienced to send to the final qualifiers in Paris, but the postponement of the Games to 2021 gave her more time, an opportunity she embraced. She planned to go for the next qualifiers in June and switched jobs and adopted a more rigorous training schedule in preparation. However, due to the pandemic, the International Olympic Committee cancelled the qualifiers and shifted to a world-ranking based method to allocate spots, which disqualified Tsubata. This was particularly disappointing to her as she felt her only chance to compete in the Olympics had been cut off and that she would be too old and not fit enough to try for the 2024 Games.

In the opening ceremony, Tsubata came into the public eye for her role in the show as a lone athlete exercising on a treadmill, representing the perseverance of Olympians, sportspeople and others as they were isolated by the pandemic. Her performance went viral as many people found it relatable to their own situations, especially regarding physical activity.
