= Coline Caussin-Battaglia =

Rower from Monaco

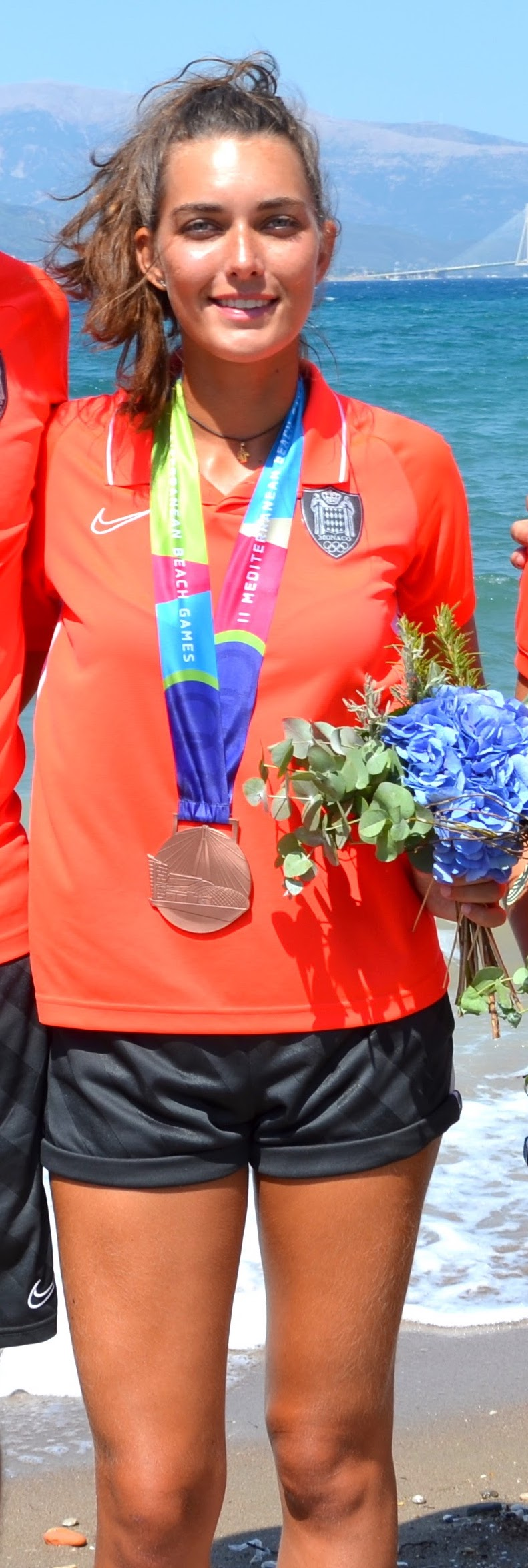

Personal information
- Nationality: Monaco
- Born: June 11, 1998 (age 28)

Sport
- Sport: Rowing
- Club: Société nautique de Monaco

Coline Caussin-Battaglia (born June 11, 1998) is a Monegasque rower. In 2019, she won the bronze medal at the second edition of the Mediterranean Beach Games in Patras, Greece.

== Biography ==
Coline Caussin-Battaglia was born on June 11, 1998, in Monaco. Her grandfather, Gérard Battaglia (March 26, 1937—March 2, 2015), was a sailor who also represented Monaco at the 1960 Summer Olympics and the 1976 Summer Olympics, and who won a bronze medal at the 1963 Mediterranean Games, while her sister Lisa Caussin-Battaglia, a professional athlete and world vice-champion in stand-up jet skiing, is competing for Olympic qualification in sailing for Monaco. She is also president of the Monaco High Level - Sport Division association.

Coline Caussin-Battaglia began her sporting career in athletics but quickly gave it up to take up rowing during her middle school years and joined the Société Nautique de Monaco club. She immediately focused on open water rowing, her club's flagship discipline. She studied in Monaco at the same time, obtaining a bachelor's degree in English before embarking on a master's degree to become a school teacher.

== Sports career ==
Caussin-Battaglia's first international competition was in 2013 at a major event in England called The Great River Race. She won her first international medal by finishing third at the 2018 World Rowing Coastal Championships in Canada in the women's quadruple sculls for Monaco. She went on to compete in numerous other world rowing championships with her club.

In 2019, at the Mediterranean Beach Games in Patras, she and her Monegasque teammate Clara Stefanelli won bronze in the women's double beach rowing sprint, in the presence of Albert II of Monaco.

In 2020, Caussin-Battaglia competed in the European Under-23 Championships in Duisburg, Germany, in the women's lightweight coxless pair with her teammate Clara Stefanelli, finishing seventh. That same year (2020), Caussin-Battaglia made her mark in Italy by winning the gold medal at the European Rowing Coastal Challenge in the solo beach rowing sprint.

At the national level, Caussin-Battaglia won silver in 2022, becoming French vice-champion in the solo beach rowing sprint in La Seyne-sur-Mer, and doubled her medal haul by winning silver in the mixed double beach rowing sprint category with her teammate Gislain Bohrer.
