= Alaa Maso =

Syrian swimmer (born 2000)

Personal information
- Nationality: Syrian
- Born: 1 January 2000 (age 25) Aleppo, Syria

Sport
- Sport: Swimming

Alaa Maso (Arabic: علاء ماسو; born 1 January 2000) is a Syrian swimmer.

He competed at the 2020 Summer Olympics for the Refugee Olympic Team, taking part in the men's 50m freestyle. At the same Games, his brother Mohamad Maso competed for Syria in the men's triathlon, coming 47th. The brothers embraced during the Parade of Nations in the opening ceremony. The two brothers had left Syria as refugees in 2015 and settled in Germany in 2016.
