= International Committee of Mediterranean Games =

Governing body of the Mediterranean Games

- Formation: 1 January 1948; 78 years ago
- Type: Sports federation
- Headquarters: (Greece) Athens
- Members: 26
- Official language: Arabic, English, French
- President: Francesco Purromuto
- Website: www.cijm.org.gr

The International Committee of Mediterranean Games (French: Comité international des Jeux méditerranéens, CIJM) is the organization of the National Olympic Committees who presides, regulates and organizes the Mediterranean Games. It is based in sport complex OACA in Athens.

== History ==
During the 3rd edition of the Mediterranean Games in 1959 in Beirut, the head of the organization and the president of the Lebanese Olympic Committee Gabriel Jemayel, also International Olympic Committee member, realized that the existence of these Games was fragile and therefore decided to create the CIJM which intervened officially on 16 June 1961.

Of all the National Olympic Committees within the Olympic Movement bordering the Mediterranean Sea, Israel and Palestine have not participated in the games, nor has Great Britain who represents the British Overseas Territory of Gibraltar and Akrotiri and Dhekelia.

In the case of Israel, Allen Guttman in The Games Must Go On argued that Israel's exclusion is both antisemitic and politically motivated due to antagonism towards Israel by the participating Arab nations. The IOC's Avery Brundage was not supportive of Israel's desire to compete, saying: "I cannot understand why anyone wants to go where he is not wanted". The International Amateur Athletics Federation pushed the issue at the 1959 Mediterranean Games in Beirut by refusing to grant permission to hold an athletics competition unless Israel were allowed to compete. Lebanese games organizer Gabriel Gemayel conceded to this, but sidestepped the ruling by holding a parallel Lebanese Games comprising athletics events between the present nations alongside the official Mediterranean Games competitions.

There are countries not bordering the Mediterranean Sea which nonetheless participate: Portugal, Andorra, Kosovo, San Marino, Serbia and North Macedonia.

Kosovo was accepted as a member of the International Committee of Mediterranean Games in October 2015 and participated for the first time in the 2018 Mediterranean Games in Tarragona, Spain. Portugal competed in the 2018 Mediterranean Games after a decision which approved Portugal as effective National Olympic Committee.

The Hellenic Olympic Committee has suggested that nine more countries that do not satisfy geographic criteria could be allowed to participate, such as Bulgaria, and some Arab countries such as Jordan and Iraq.

== Mediterranean Sports Federations ==
19 Federations in 2018:

1. Confédération Méditerranéenne d'Escrime (COMES)
2. Confédération Méditerranéenne d'Haltérophilie (MWC)
3. Confédération Méditerranéenne de Handball (MHC)
4. Mediterranean Committee of Associated Wrestling Styles (CMLA)
5. Union Européenne et Méditerranéenne de Tir a l'arc (EMAU)
6. Confederation of Mediterranean Badminton (COMEBA)
7. Confédération Méditerranéenne de Wakeboard et Ski Nautique (MWWC)
8. Ligue Méditerranéenne de Football
9. Mediterranean Karate Federations Union
10. Union Méditerranéenne de Voile
11. Conféderation Méditerranéenne de Natation (C.O.ME.N.)
12. Union Méditerranéenne de Tennis de Table (UMTT)
13. Union méditerranéenne de Taekwondo
14. Confédération Méditerranéenne de Gymnastique
15. Fédération Méditerranéenne de WUSHU
16. Union de la Méditerranée des sports de Boules
17. Union Méditerranéenne d'Athlétisme
18. Union des Fédérations Méditerranéennes des Activités Subaquatiques
19. Confederation of Mediterranean Orienteering Federations (COMOF)
20. Gymanastics
21. Flying Disc
- Boxing no / Kickboxing no

== Members ==
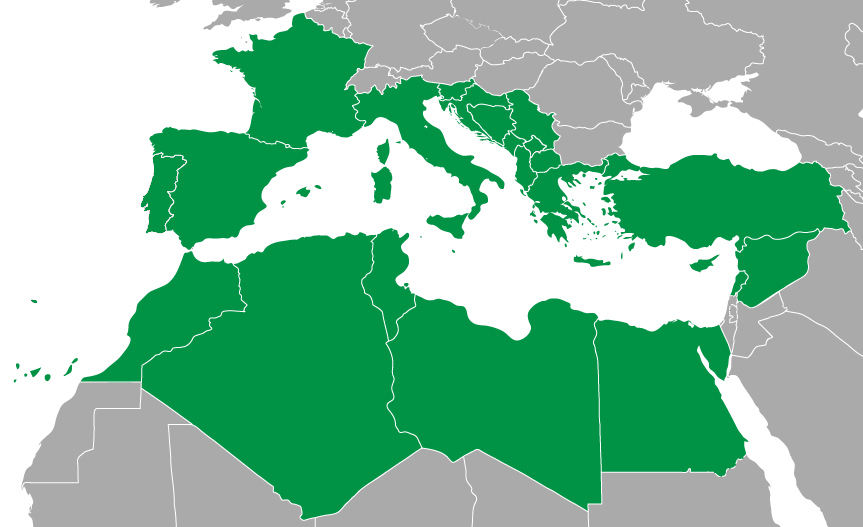
Maps of the 26 participants Nations

At present, 26 countries participate in the games:

- Africa: Algeria, Egypt, Libya, Morocco and Tunisia
- Asia: Lebanon and Syria.
- Europe: Albania, Andorra, Bosnia and Herzegovina, Croatia, Cyprus, France, Greece, Italy, Kosovo, Malta, Monaco, Montenegro, North Macedonia, Portugal, San Marino, Serbia, Slovenia, Spain and Turkey.
- Albania
- Algeria
- Andorra
- Bosnia and Herzegovina
- Cyprus
- Croatia
- Egypt
- France
- Greece
- Italy
- Kosovo
- Lebanon
- Libya
- North Macedonia
- Malta
- Morocco
- Monaco
- Montenegro
- Portugal
- San Marino
- Serbia
- Syria
- Slovenia
- Spain
- Tunisia
- Turkey

== See also ==
- Mediterranean Games
- Mediterranean Beach Games
- Mediterranean Youth Games
