= Mediterranean Beach Games =

Multi-sport event

- Purpose: Multi-sport event for nations on the Mediterranean Sea
- Frequency: Every four years
- Inaugurated: 2015 Mediterranean Beach Games in Italy
- Most recent: 2023 Mediterranean Beach Games in Greece
- Next event: 2027 Mediterranean Beach Games in Portugal
- President: Davide Tizzano

The Mediterranean Beach Games is a multi-sport event organized by the International Committee of Mediterranean Games (CIJM) since 2015.

== Formation ==
The CIJM formed the games in a meeting on October 20, 2012 in Mersin, Turkey, and decided on a format of every 4 years starting from 2015. The Games consist only water sports and beach sports, which aim at bringing together young athletes of the Mediterranean area, giving them the opportunity to participate in sport events.

== History ==
Pescara, Italy was awarded the rights to host the first edition of the Mediterranean Beach Games from 28 August to 6 September. The sports included in the program of the 1st Mediterranean Beach Games are the following: Aquathlon, Beach Handball, Beach Soccer, Beach Tennis, Beach Volley, Beach Wrestling, Finswimming, Canoe Ocean Racing, Open Water Swimming, Rowing Beach Sprint, Water Ski.

Patras, Greece hosted the 2019 games, and in October, 2021, Heraklion, Greece signed a contract to host the 2023 games.

== Editions ==
Number	Year	Host City	Host Country	Nations	Athletes	Sports	Events	Best Nation
1	2015	Pescara	Italy	24	900	11	58	Italy
2	2019	Patras	Greece	26	700	11	55	Greece
3	2023	Heraklion	Greece	26	765	13	54	Italy
4	2027	Portimão	Portugal					

== Medals (2015–2023) ==
Rank	Nation	Gold	Silver	Bronze	Total
1	Italy	61	52	38	151
2	Greece	37	33	30	100
3	France	33	23	27	83
4	Spain	18	11	14	43
5	Egypt	5	8	7	20
6	Turkey	3	4	6	13
7	Tunisia	2	8	13	23
8	Croatia	2	6	10	18
9	Algeria	2	6	4	12
10	Syria	2	1	2	5
11	Portugal	1	9	3	13
12	Serbia	1	1	0	2
13	Albania	1	0	1	2
14	Slovenia	0	2	4	6
15	Cyprus	0	2	2	4
16	Morocco	0	1	2	3
17	San Marino	0	0	3	3
18	Monaco	0	0	2	2
19	Libya	0	0	1	1
Totals (19 entries)		168	167	169	504

== See also ==
- International Committee of Mediterranean Games
- Mediterranean Games
- Mediterranean Athletics U23 Championships
