= Syria at the 2026 Mediterranean Games =

- IOC code: SYR
- NOC: Syrian Olympic Committee

in Taranto, Italy
- Competitors: 28 in 8 sports
- Medals Ranked 24th: Gold 0 Silver 0 Bronze 4 Total 4

Mediterranean Games appearances (overview)
- 1951; 1955; 1959; 1963; 1967; 1971; 1975; 1979; 1983; 1987; 1991; 1993; 1997; 2001; 2005; 2009; 2013; 2018; 2022; 2026

Other related appearances
- United Arab Republic (1959)

Syria competed at the 2026 Mediterranean Games in Taranto, Italy from 21 August to 3 September 2026.

== Competitors ==
The following is the list of number of competitors participating at the Games per sport/discipline.

Sport	Men	Women	Total
Archery	1	0	1
Artistic gymnastics	1	1	2
Cycling	0	2	2
Judo	4	3	7
Karate	2	2	4
Rhythmic gymnastics	0	1	1
Table tennis	2	2	4
Weightlifting	1	0	1
Wrestling	6	0	6
Total	17	11	28

== Medal table ==
Medal	Name	Sport	Event	Date
Bronze	Mhdasad Alosta	Wrestling	Men's Greco-Roman 60 kg	23 August
Bronze	Ibrahim Altabbaa	Wrestling	Men's freestyle 57 kg	24 August
Bronze	Mohamad Omran Ajineh	Judo	Men's 60 kg	28 August
Bronze	Hamza Alasad Hallak	Weightlifting	Men's 110 kg – Clean and jerk	2 September

Medals by date
Day	Date	1st place, gold medalist(s)	2nd place, silver medalist(s)	3rd place, bronze medalist(s)	Total
3	23 August	0	0	1	1
4	24 August	0	0	1	1
8	28 August	0	0	1	1
13	2 September	0	0	1	1
Total		0	0	4	4

Medals by sport
Sport	1st place, gold medalist(s)	2nd place, silver medalist(s)	3rd place, bronze medalist(s)	Total
Judo	0	0	1	1
Weightlifting	0	0	1	1
Wrestling	0	0	2	2
Total	0	0	4	4

Medals by gender
Gender	1st place, gold medalist(s)	2nd place, silver medalist(s)	3rd place, bronze medalist(s)	Total
Male	0	0	4	4
Female	0	0	0	0
Total	0	0	4	4

== Archery ==
Athlete	Event	Ranking round		Round of 64	Round of 32	Round of 16	Quarterfinals	Semifinals	Final / BM	
Athlete	Event	Score	Seed	Opposition Score	Opposition Score	Opposition Score	Opposition Score	Opposition Score	Opposition Score	Rank
Mohammad Zekrek	Men's individual	545	35 Q	El Helali (CYP); L 5–6	Did not advance					

== Artistic gymnastics ==
Men

Athlete	Event	Qualification								Final							
Athlete	Event	Apparatus						Total	Rank	Apparatus						Total	Rank
Athlete	Event	F	PH	R	V	PB	HB	Total	Rank	F	PH	R	V	PB	HB	Total	Rank
Mhd Talal Blidy	Floor	10.750	—N/a					10.750	35	Did not advance							
Mhd Talal Blidy	Rings	—N/a		9.600	—N/a			9.600	38	Did not advance							
Mhd Talal Blidy	Vault	—N/a			11.275	—N/a		11.275	10	Did not advance							

Women

Athlete	Event	Qualification						Final					
Athlete	Event	Apparatus				Total	Rank	Apparatus				Total	Rank
Athlete	Event	V	UB	B	F	Total	Rank	V	UB	B	F	Total	Rank
Seema Tello	Floor	—N/a			8.650	8.650	38	Did not advance					

== Cycling ==
Athlete	Event	Final	
Athlete	Event	Time	Rank
Myran Alfares	Women's road race	2:18:31	30
Hala Zidan	Women's road race	DNF	

== Judo ==
Men

Athlete	Event	Round of 16	Quarterfinals	Semifinals	Repechage	Final / BM	Rank
Athlete	Event	Opposition Result	Opposition Result	Opposition Result	Opposition Result	Opposition Result	Rank
Mohamad Omran Ajineh	60 kg	Alaoui Cherifi (MAR); L 01s2–02s1	Did not advance		Starkel (SLO); W 110s2–00s1	Motoly-Bongambé (FRA); W 100s1–00	3rd place, bronze medalist(s)
Mohmad Shaker Almasre	66 kg	D. Klačar (CRO); L 00h–100	Did not advance				
Omar Elshehada	73 kg	R. Klačar (CRO); L 00s1–101	Did not advance				
Majd Hajkadoor	81 kg	Hebib (BIH); L 00s2–101s1	Did not advance				

Women

Athlete	Event	Round of 16	Quarterfinals	Semifinals	Repechage	Final / BM	Rank
Athlete	Event	Opposition Result	Opposition Result	Opposition Result	Opposition Result	Opposition Result	Rank
Laila Kenan	48 kg	Milić (SRB); L 01–100	Did not advance				
Joudy Obid	78 kg	Klinger (BIH); L 00–101	Did not advance				

== Karate ==
Athlete	Event	Round of 16	Quarterfinals	Semifinals	Repechage 1	Repechage 2	Final / BM	Rank
Athlete	Event	Opposition Result	Opposition Result	Opposition Result	Opposition Result	Opposition Result	Opposition Result	Rank
Mustfa Almasalmeh	Men's 67 kg	Belistojanoski (MKD); L 1–6	Did not advance		Bye	Maresca (ITA); L 0–4	Did not advance	
Fawaz Bani Almarjeh	Men's 75 kg	Yürür (TUR); L 0–1	Did not advance		Basha (ALB); W 1–0	—N/a	De Vivo (ITA); L 0–8	4
Ledy Asfoura	Women's 50 kg	Bye	Perfetto (ITA); L 3–5	Did not advance	Sgardelli (CRO); L 0–8	—N/a	Did not advance	
Shahed Mlak	Women's 61 kg	Kostovska (MKD); L 0–8	Did not advance					

== Rhythmic gymnastics ==
Athlete	Event	Qualification						Final					
Athlete	Event	Hoop	Ball	Clubs	Ribbon	Total	Rank	Hoop	Ball	Clubs	Ribbon	Total	Rank
Elissar Hanounik	All-around	22.450	20.100	20.100	20.050	62.650	21	Did not advance					

== Table tennis ==
Men

Athlete	Event	Round of 32	Round of 16	Quarterfinals	Semifinals	Final / BM	
Athlete	Event	Opposition Result	Opposition Result	Opposition Result	Opposition Result	Opposition Result	Rank
Abdul Razzak Alhallak	Singles	Ahmed (EGY); L 0–4	Did not advance				
Obaida Zaza	Singles	Öçal (TUR); L 0–4	Did not advance				
Abdul Razzak Alhallak; Obaida Zaza	Team	—N/a	Greece (GRE); L 0–3	Did not advance			

Women

Athlete	Event	Round of 32	Round of 16	Quarterfinals	Semifinals	Final / BM	
Athlete	Event	Opposition Result	Opposition Result	Opposition Result	Opposition Result	Opposition Result	Rank
Leen Sager Ogli	Singles	Monfardini (ITA); L 0–4	Did not advance				
Hend Zaza	Singles	Morice (ALG); W 4–1	Goda (EGY); L 1–4	Did not advance			
Leen Sager Ogli; Hend Zaza	Team	—N/a	Turkey (TUR); L 0–3	Did not advance			

Mixed

Athlete	Event	Round of 32	Round of 16	Quarterfinals	Semifinals	Final / BM	
Athlete	Event	Opposition Result	Opposition Result	Opposition Result	Opposition Result	Opposition Result	Rank
Hend Zaza; Obaida Zaza	Doubles	Bye	Monfardini; Oyebode (ITA); L 0–3	Did not advance			

== Weightlifting ==
Athlete	Event	Snatch					Clean & Jerk					Total
Athlete	Event	1	2	3	Result	Rank	1	2	3	Result	Rank	Total
Hamza Alasad Hallak	Men's 110 kg	154	158	161	161	7	186	191	~~194~~	191	3rd place, bronze medalist(s)	352

== Wrestling ==
Key:

- WO – walkover
- VT (ranking points: 5–0 or 0–5) – Victory by fall.
- VB (ranking points: 5–0 or 0–5) – Victory by injury (VF for forfeit, VA for withdrawal or disqualification)
- PP (ranking points: 3–1 or 1–3) – Decision by points – the loser with technical points.
- PO (ranking points: 3–0 or 0–3) – Decision by points – the loser without technical points.
- ST (ranking points: 4–0 or 0–4) – Great superiority – the loser without technical points and a margin of victory of at least 8 (Greco-Roman) or 10 (freestyle) points.
- SP (ranking points: 4–1 or 1–4) – Technical superiority – the loser with technical points and a margin of victory of at least 8 (Greco-Roman) or 10 (freestyle) points.

Freestyle

Athlete	Event	Group Stage				Round of 16	Quarterfinals	Semifinals	Repechage	Final / BM	
Athlete	Event	Opposition Result	Opposition Result	Opposition Result	Opposition Result	Opposition Result	Opposition Result	Opposition Result	Opposition Result	Opposition Result	Rank
Ibrahim Altabbaa	Men's 57 kg	Usinov (MKD); W 6–0 ^{PP}	Karavuş (TUR); L 0–10 ^{ST}	Pirrone (ITA); W 9–2 ^{PP}	Galbouraev (FRA); L 0–11 ^{ST}	—N/a					3rd place, bronze medalist(s)
Ahmad Dirki	Men's 65 kg	—N/a				—N/a	Alili (MKD); W 8–1 ^{PP}	Abakarov (ALB); L 2–6 ^{PP}	—N/a	Mo (EGY); L 3–5 ^{PP}	4
Majd Aisha	Men's 74 kg	—N/a				Yeşil (TUR); L 0–10 ^{VB}	Did not advance				
Mohamad Alosta	Men's 86 kg	—N/a				Bye	Niccolini (ITA); L 0–10 ^{ST}	Did not advance			

Greco-Roman

Athlete	Event	Round of 16	Quarterfinals	Semifinals	Repechage	Final / BM	
Athlete	Event	Opposition Result	Opposition Result	Opposition Result	Opposition Result	Opposition Result	Rank
Mhdasad Alosta	Men's 60 kg	Bye	Öztürk (TUR); W 8–4 ^{PP}	Saad (EGY); L 1–9 ^{PP}	—N/a	Ainaoui (FRA); W 3–1 ^{PP}	3rd place, bronze medalist(s)
Mohamad Alobeid	Men's 77 kg	Doulache (ALG); L 0–8 ^{PO}	Did not advance				
