= Bosnia and Herzegovina at the Mediterranean Games =

- IOC code: BIH
- NOC: Olympic Committee of Bosnia and Herzegovina
- Medals Ranked 22nd: Gold 7 Silver 8 Bronze 30 Total 45

Mediterranean Games appearances (overview)
- 1993; 1997; 2001; 2005; 2009; 2013; 2018; 2022; 2026

Other related appearances
- Yugoslavia (1951–1991)

Bosnia and Herzegovina has sent athletes to every edition of the quadrennial Mediterranean Games since the nation's first appearance at the 1993 Mediterranean Games following its independence from Yugoslavia. As of 2026, Bosnian athletes have won a total of 45 medals.

== Medal tables ==
Games	Athletes	Gold	Silver	Bronze	Total	Rank
1951–1991	as part of Yugoslavia (YUG)					
(France) 1993 Languedoc-Roussillon	95	2	0	1	3	12
(Italy) 1997 Bari	90	0	1	1	2	15
(Tunisia) 2001 Tunis	26	0	0	3	3	17
(Spain) 2005 Almería	49	1	2	3	6	15
(Italy) 2009 Pescara	83	0	3	5	8	19
(Turkey) 2013 Mersin	n/a	0	1	3	4	20
(Spain) 2018 Tarragona	70	1	1	3	5	19
(Algeria) 2022 Oran	54	2	0	6	8	19
(Italy) 2026 Taranto	76	1	0	5	6	20
(Kosovo) 2030 Pristina	future Event					
Total		7	8	30	45	22

=== Medals by sport ===
Sport	Gold	Silver	Bronze	Total
Swimming	2	0	0	2
Karate	1	2	11	14
Athletics	1	1	6	8
Shooting	1	1	0	2
Boxing	1	0	4	5
Basketball	1	0	0	1
Judo	0	2	7	9
Boules	0	1	0	1
Tennis	0	1	0	1
Taekwondo	0	0	1	1
Wrestling	0	0	1	1
Totals (11 entries)	7	8	30	45

== List of medalists ==
Medal	Name	Games	Sport	Event
Gold	Vesna Bajkuša; Tima Džebo; Mara Lakić; Silvana Mirvić; Razija Mujanović; Rankica Šarenac; Vera Sarić; Naida Sušić; Amra Zubčević	(France) 1993 Languedoc-Roussillon	Basketball	Women's tournament
Gold	Almedin Fetahović	(France) 1993 Languedoc-Roussillon	Boxing	Men's -71 kg
Bronze	Eldin Pekmez	(France) 1993 Languedoc-Roussillon	Karate	Men's +80 kg
Silver	Nedžad Fazlija	(Italy) 1997 Bari	Shooting	Men's 50 m rifle 3 positions
Bronze	Esmir Kukić	(Italy) 1997 Bari	Boxing	Men's -91 kg
Bronze	Elvir Krehmić	(Tunisia) 2001 Tunis	Athletics	Men's high jump
Bronze	Adnan Hadžić	(Tunisia) 2001 Tunis	Karate	Men's -75 kg
Bronze	Arnel Kalušić	(Tunisia) 2001 Tunis	Karate	Men's +80 kg
Gold	Arnela Odžaković	(Spain) 2005 Almería	Karate	Women's -65 kg
Silver	Markica Dodig	(Spain) 2005 Almería	Boules	Bocce Men's Precision throw
Silver	Adnan Hadžić	(Spain) 2005 Almería	Karate	Men's -75 kg
Bronze	Hamza Alić	(Spain) 2005 Almería	Athletics	Men's shot put
Bronze	Amel Mekić	(Spain) 2005 Almería	Judo	Men's -100 kg
Bronze	Merima Softić	(Spain) 2005 Almería	Karate	Women's Open
Silver	Hamza Alić	(Italy) 2009 Pescara	Athletics	Men's shot put
Silver	Larisa Cerić	(Italy) 2009 Pescara	Judo	Women's +78 kg
Silver	Merima Softić	(Italy) 2009 Pescara	Karate	Women's +68 kg
Bronze	Velibor Vidić	(Italy) 2009 Pescara	Boxing	Men's -69 kg
Bronze	Amel Mekić	(Italy) 2009 Pescara	Judo	Men's -100 kg
Bronze	Edin Muslić	(Italy) 2009 Pescara	Karate	Men's -100 kg
Bronze	Arnela Odžaković	(Italy) 2009 Pescara	Karate	Women's -68 kg
Bronze	Kemal Tajić	(Italy) 2009 Pescara	Wrestling	Men's Freestyle -96 kg
Silver	Amel Mekić	(Turkey) 2013 Mersin	Judo	Men's -100 kg
Bronze	Hamza Alić	(Turkey) 2013 Mersin	Athletics	Men's shot put
Bronze	Džemal Bošnjak	(Turkey) 2013 Mersin	Boxing	Men's -81 kg
Bronze	Larisa Cerić	(Turkey) 2013 Mersin	Judo	Women's +78 kg
Gold	Hamza Alić	(Spain) 2018 Tarragona	Athletics	Men's shot put
Silver	Nefisa Berberović; Dea Herdželaš	(Spain) 2018 Tarragona	Tennis	Women's doubles
Bronze	Mesud Pezer	(Spain) 2018 Tarragona	Athletics	Men's shot put
Bronze	Abedin Mujezinović	(Spain) 2018 Tarragona	Athletics	Men's 800 m
Bronze	Dejan Mileusnić	(Spain) 2018 Tarragona	Athletics	Men's javelin throw
Gold	Lana Pudar	(Algeria) 2022 Oran	Swimming	Women's 200 m butterfly
Gold	Lana Pudar	(Algeria) 2022 Oran	Swimming	Women's 100 m butterfly
Bronze	Nejra Sipović	(Algeria) 2022 Oran	Karate	Women's -61 kg
Bronze	Hamza Turulja	(Algeria) 2022 Oran	Karate	Men's -75 kg
Bronze	Rijad Džuho	(Algeria) 2022 Oran	Karate	Men's +84 kg
Bronze	Anđela Samardžić	(Algeria) 2022 Oran	Judo	Women's -57 kg
Bronze	Toni Miletić	(Algeria) 2022 Oran	Judo	Men's -90 kg
Bronze	Larisa Cerić	(Algeria) 2022 Oran	Judo	Women's +78 kg
Gold	Zakira Pušina	(Italy) 2026 Taranto	Shooting	Women's rifle
Bronze	Dylan Rajić	(Italy) 2026 Taranto	Boxing	Men's +90 kg
Bronze	Toni Miletić	(Italy) 2026 Taranto	Judo	Men's -90 kg
Bronze	Nejra Sipović	(Italy) 2026 Taranto	Karate	Women's -55 kg
Bronze	Amina Fejzić	(Italy) 2026 Taranto	Karate	Women's -68 kg
Bronze	Ada Avdagić	(Italy) 2026 Taranto	Taekwondo	Women's -57 kg

== Athletes with most medals ==
The Bosnian athletes who won the most gold medals in the history of the Mediterranean Games is the swimmer Lana Pudar and the most medals winner is the shot putter Hamza Alić.

Athlete	Sport	Games	Gold medal	Silver medal	Bronze medal	Total
**Lana Pudar**	Swimming	2022	2	0	0	2
Hamza Alić	Athletics	2005, 2009, 2013, 2018	1	1	2	4
Arnela Odžaković	Karate	2005, 2009	1	0	1	2
**Larisa Cerić**	Judo	2009, 2013, 2022	0	1	2	3
Amel Mekić	Judo	2005, 2009, 2013	0	1	2	3
Adnan Hadžić	Karate	2001, 2005	0	1	1	2
Merima Softić	Karate	2005, 2009	0	1	1	2

Notes: athletes in bold are still active.

== See also ==
- Bosnia and Herzegovina at the Olympics
- Bosnia and Herzegovina at the Paralympics
