= Karate at the Mediterranean Games =

Karate competition

Karate is one of the sports at the quadrennial Mediterranean Games competition. It has been a sport in the program of the Mediterranean Games since its inception in 1993.

== Editions ==
Games	Year	Host	Winner of the medal table	Second in the medal table	Third in the medal table
XII	1993	(France) Languedoc-Roussillon	France	Spain	Turkey
XIII	1997	(Italy) Bari	Italy	France	Spain
XIV	2001	(Tunisia) Tunis	France	Tunisia	Spain
XV	2005	(Spain) Almería	Italy	Spain	Egypt
XVI	2009	(Italy) Pescara	Greece	France	Italy
XVII	2013	(Turkey) Mersin	Turkey	Egypt	Italy
XVIII	2018	(Spain) Tarragona	Turkey	France	Morocco
XIX	2022	(Algeria) Oran	Algeria	Egypt	Greece
XX	2026	(Italy) Taranto	Egypt	Morocco	Algeria

== All-time medal table ==
Updated after the 2026 Mediterranean Games

Rank	Nation	Gold	Silver	Bronze	Total
1	France (FRA)	17	14	19	50
2	Italy (ITA)	14	14	34	62
3	Turkey (TUR)	14	9	26	49
4	Egypt (EGY)	10	13	19	42
5	Spain (ESP)	9	16	16	41
6	Algeria (ALG)	7	3	12	22
7	Greece (GRE)	6	5	8	19
8	Tunisia (TUN)	6	3	10	19
9	Morocco (MAR)	3	3	9	15
10	Croatia (CRO)	2	5	6	13
11	North Macedonia (MKD)	2	0	2	4
12	Bosnia and Herzegovina (BIH)	1	2	11	14
13	Serbia and Montenegro (SCG)	1	2	0	3
14	Serbia (SRB)	1	1	3	5
15	Slovenia (SLO)	1	0	5	6
16	Kosovo (KOS)	1	0	0	1
16	Portugal (POR)	1	0	0	1
18	Montenegro (MNE)	0	4	2	6
19	Yugoslavia (YUG)	0	1	6	7
20	Libya (LBA)	0	1	0	1
21	Cyprus (CYP)	0	0	2	2
21	Syria (SYR)	0	0	2	2
Totals (22 entries)		96	96	192	384

== Best results by event and nation (2009-current) ==
Event		(Algeria) ALG	(Bosnia and Herzegovina) BIH	(Croatia) CRO	(Cyprus) CYP	(Egypt) EGY	(Spain) ESP	(France) FRA	(Greece) GRE	(Italy) ITA	(Kosovo) KOS	(Libya) LBA	(Morocco) MAR	(North Macedonia) MKD	(Montenegro) MNE	(Portugal) POR	(Slovenia) SLO	(Serbia) SRB	(Syria) SYR	(Tunisia) TUN	(Turkey) TUR
Men's
Men's	Kumite –60 kg	2nd place, silver medalist(s)	3rd place, bronze medalist(s)	3rd place, bronze medalist(s)		2nd place, silver medalist(s)		3rd place, bronze medalist(s)	3rd place, bronze medalist(s)	1st place, gold medalist(s)	1st place, gold medalist(s)		1st place, gold medalist(s)		3rd place, bronze medalist(s)					2nd place, silver medalist(s)	1st place, gold medalist(s)
Men's	Kumite –67 kg	3rd place, bronze medalist(s)		2nd place, silver medalist(s)	3rd place, bronze medalist(s)	2nd place, silver medalist(s)	3rd place, bronze medalist(s)	1st place, gold medalist(s)	1st place, gold medalist(s)	2nd place, silver medalist(s)			2nd place, silver medalist(s)	1st place, gold medalist(s)				3rd place, bronze medalist(s)	3rd place, bronze medalist(s)		1st place, gold medalist(s)
Men's	Kumite –75 kg	1st place, gold medalist(s)	3rd place, bronze medalist(s)	2nd place, silver medalist(s)		2nd place, silver medalist(s)	2nd place, silver medalist(s)	1st place, gold medalist(s)		2nd place, silver medalist(s)			3rd place, bronze medalist(s)								1st place, gold medalist(s)
Men's	Kumite –84 kg	3rd place, bronze medalist(s)		3rd place, bronze medalist(s)		1st place, gold medalist(s)		2nd place, silver medalist(s)	1st place, gold medalist(s)	2nd place, silver medalist(s)		2nd place, silver medalist(s)	1st place, gold medalist(s)	1st place, gold medalist(s)			3rd place, bronze medalist(s)	2nd place, silver medalist(s)			3rd place, bronze medalist(s)
Men's	Kumite +84 kg	1st place, gold medalist(s)	3rd place, bronze medalist(s)	1st place, gold medalist(s)		1st place, gold medalist(s)	1st place, gold medalist(s)		3rd place, bronze medalist(s)	1st place, gold medalist(s)			3rd place, bronze medalist(s)	3rd place, bronze medalist(s)	2nd place, silver medalist(s)			3rd place, bronze medalist(s)			2nd place, silver medalist(s)
Women's
Women's	Kumite –50 kg	1st place, gold medalist(s)		3rd place, bronze medalist(s)		2nd place, silver medalist(s)	3rd place, bronze medalist(s)	3rd place, bronze medalist(s)		2nd place, silver medalist(s)			2nd place, silver medalist(s)					1st place, gold medalist(s)			1st place, gold medalist(s)
Women's	Kumite –55 kg	1st place, gold medalist(s)	3rd place, bronze medalist(s)	2nd place, silver medalist(s)		2nd place, silver medalist(s)	3rd place, bronze medalist(s)	2nd place, silver medalist(s)		2nd place, silver medalist(s)			1st place, gold medalist(s)							1st place, gold medalist(s)	1st place, gold medalist(s)
Women's	Kumite –61 kg	1st place, gold medalist(s)	3rd place, bronze medalist(s)			1st place, gold medalist(s)	3rd place, bronze medalist(s)	1st place, gold medalist(s)		2nd place, silver medalist(s)			3rd place, bronze medalist(s)				1st place, gold medalist(s)			2nd place, silver medalist(s)	2nd place, silver medalist(s)
Women's	Kumite –68 kg		3rd place, bronze medalist(s)	1st place, gold medalist(s)		1st place, gold medalist(s)	2nd place, silver medalist(s)	3rd place, bronze medalist(s)	2nd place, silver medalist(s)	1st place, gold medalist(s)			3rd place, bronze medalist(s)		3rd place, bronze medalist(s)		3rd place, bronze medalist(s)				1st place, gold medalist(s)
Women's	Kumite +68 kg		2nd place, silver medalist(s)		3rd place, bronze medalist(s)	1st place, gold medalist(s)	3rd place, bronze medalist(s)	1st place, gold medalist(s)	1st place, gold medalist(s)	3rd place, bronze medalist(s)					2nd place, silver medalist(s)	1st place, gold medalist(s)				3rd place, bronze medalist(s)	1st place, gold medalist(s)

== Best results by event and nation (1993-2005) ==
Event		(Algeria) ALG	(Bosnia and Herzegovina) BIH	(Croatia) CRO	(Egypt) EGY	(Spain) ESP	(France) FRA	(Greece) GRE	(Italy) ITA	(Morocco) MAR	(Serbia and Montenegro) SCG	(Slovenia) SLO	(Syria) SYR	(Tunisia) TUN	(Turkey) TUR	(Socialist Federal Republic of Yugoslavia) YUG
Men's
Men's	60 kg	3rd place, bronze medalist(s)			3rd place, bronze medalist(s)	1st place, gold medalist(s)	1st place, gold medalist(s)		2nd place, silver medalist(s)	3rd place, bronze medalist(s)				1st place, gold medalist(s)	3rd place, bronze medalist(s)	
Men's	65 kg	1st place, gold medalist(s)			3rd place, bronze medalist(s)	1st place, gold medalist(s)	1st place, gold medalist(s)		1st place, gold medalist(s)					3rd place, bronze medalist(s)		
Men's	70 kg	3rd place, bronze medalist(s)		3rd place, bronze medalist(s)	1st place, gold medalist(s)	2nd place, silver medalist(s)	1st place, gold medalist(s)		3rd place, bronze medalist(s)						1st place, gold medalist(s)	
Men's	75 kg	3rd place, bronze medalist(s)	2nd place, silver medalist(s)		2nd place, silver medalist(s)	2nd place, silver medalist(s)	1st place, gold medalist(s)	3rd place, bronze medalist(s)	1st place, gold medalist(s)	3rd place, bronze medalist(s)				1st place, gold medalist(s)	3rd place, bronze medalist(s)	
Men's	80 kg	3rd place, bronze medalist(s)			2nd place, silver medalist(s)	1st place, gold medalist(s)	1st place, gold medalist(s)		2nd place, silver medalist(s)		2nd place, silver medalist(s)			1st place, gold medalist(s)	2nd place, silver medalist(s)	
Men's	+80 kg		3rd place, bronze medalist(s)			1st place, gold medalist(s)	1st place, gold medalist(s)	3rd place, bronze medalist(s)	1st place, gold medalist(s)	2nd place, silver medalist(s)	2nd place, silver medalist(s)		3rd place, bronze medalist(s)	2nd place, silver medalist(s)	3rd place, bronze medalist(s)	
Men's	Open				3rd place, bronze medalist(s)	2nd place, silver medalist(s)	1st place, gold medalist(s)	1st place, gold medalist(s)	1st place, gold medalist(s)						3rd place, bronze medalist(s)	2nd place, silver medalist(s)
Women's
Women's	50 kg				1st place, gold medalist(s)	2nd place, silver medalist(s)	3rd place, bronze medalist(s)		1st place, gold medalist(s)			3rd place, bronze medalist(s)		1st place, gold medalist(s)	3rd place, bronze medalist(s)	
Women's	55 kg	2nd place, silver medalist(s)		3rd place, bronze medalist(s)		1st place, gold medalist(s)	2nd place, silver medalist(s)		1st place, gold medalist(s)			3rd place, bronze medalist(s)		3rd place, bronze medalist(s)		
Women's	60 kg			2nd place, silver medalist(s)	2nd place, silver medalist(s)	3rd place, bronze medalist(s)	1st place, gold medalist(s)		1st place, gold medalist(s)		1st place, gold medalist(s)			3rd place, bronze medalist(s)	3rd place, bronze medalist(s)	3rd place, bronze medalist(s)
Women's	65 kg		1st place, gold medalist(s)			1st place, gold medalist(s)	2nd place, silver medalist(s)	3rd place, bronze medalist(s)	3rd place, bronze medalist(s)						3rd place, bronze medalist(s)	3rd place, bronze medalist(s)
Women's	+65 kg	3rd place, bronze medalist(s)				1st place, gold medalist(s)	2nd place, silver medalist(s)	1st place, gold medalist(s)	1st place, gold medalist(s)						2nd place, silver medalist(s)	3rd place, bronze medalist(s)
Women's	Open		3rd place, bronze medalist(s)			2nd place, silver medalist(s)	3rd place, bronze medalist(s)	2nd place, silver medalist(s)	3rd place, bronze medalist(s)					3rd place, bronze medalist(s)	1st place, gold medalist(s)	3rd place, bronze medalist(s)
