= Equestrian at the Mediterranean Games =

Equestrian is one of the sports at the quadrennial Mediterranean Games competition. It has been held irregularly since the second edition in 1955.

== Events ==
Games	Year	Host city	Host country	Events	Best nation
II	1955	Barcelona	Spain	2	Spain (ESP)
III	1959	Beirut	Lebanon	6	United Arab Republic (UAR)
VIII	1979	Split	Yugoslavia	2	France (FRA)
IX	1983	Casablanca	Morocco	2	Spain (ESP)
XI	1991	Athens	Greece	2	France (FRA)
XII	1993	Languedoc-Rousillon	France	2	France (FRA)
XIII	1997	Bari	Italy	2	France (FRA)
XV	2005	Almería	Spain	2	Italy (ITA)
XVI	2009	Pescara	Italy	2	France (FRA)
XVIII	2018	Tarragona	Spain	2	France (FRA)
XIX	2022	Oran	Algeria	2	Syria (SYR)
XX	2026	Taranto	Italy	2	Spain (ESP)

=== All-time medal table ===
Updated after the most recent 2026 Mediterranean Games

Rank	Nation	Gold	Silver	Bronze	Total
1	France (FRA)	12	8	3	23
2	Italy (ITA)	4	6	4	14
3	United Arab Republic (UAR)	4	5	3	12
4	Spain (ESP)	3	5	7	15
5	Lebanon (LBN)	2	1	3	6
6	Syria (SYR)	2	1	0	3
7	Portugal (POR)	1	0	0	1
8	Egypt (EGY)	0	1	3	4
9	Turkey (TUR)	0	1	1	2
10	Morocco (MAR)	0	0	3	3
11	Greece (GRE)	0	0	1	1
Totals (11 entries)		28	28	28	84
