= Syria at the 2009 Mediterranean Games =

- IOC code: SYR
- NOC: Syrian Olympic Committee

in Pescara
- Competitors: 30
- Medals Ranked 15th: Gold 2 Silver 3 Bronze 7 Total 12

Mediterranean Games appearances (overview)
- 1951; 1955; 1959; 1963; 1967; 1971; 1975; 1979; 1983; 1987; 1991; 1993; 1997; 2001; 2005; 2009; 2013; 2018; 2022

Other related appearances
- United Arab Republic (1959)

Syria (SYR) competed at the 2009 Mediterranean Games in Pescara, Italy. The nation had a total number of 30 participants (26 men and 4 women).

== Medals ==
=== Gold ===
Weightlifting

- Men's 105 kg (Clean & Jerk): Ahed Joughili
- Men's 105 kg (Snatch): Ahed Joughili

=== Silver ===
Wrestling

- Men's Freestyle 55 kg: Firas Al-Rifai
- Men's Freestyle 66 kg: Mazen Qadmanie
- Men's Freestyle 96 kg: Raja Al-Karrad

=== Bronze ===
Wrestling

- Men's Greco-Roman 66 kg: Moustafa Al-Nakdali
- Men's Freestyle 60 kg: Ghazwan Al-Lazkani

Weightlifting

- Men's 56 kg (Clean & Jerk): Ramo Mustapha

Karate

- Men's under-67 kg: Karem Othman

Boxing

- Men's bantam 54 kg: Wessam Salamana
- Men's heavyweight 91 kg: Mohammad Ghossoun

Judo

- Men's extra-light 60 kg: Fadi Darwish

== See also ==
- Syria at the 2005 Mediterranean Games
