= Bosnia and Herzegovina at the 2005 Mediterranean Games =

- IOC code: BIH
- NOC: Olympic Committee of Bosnia and Herzegovina

in Almería
- Medals Ranked 15th: Gold 1 Silver 2 Bronze 3 Total 6

Mediterranean Games appearances (overview)
- 1993; 1997; 2001; 2005; 2009; 2013; 2018; 2022

Other related appearances
- Yugoslavia (1951–1991)

Bosnia and Herzegovina (BIH) competed at the 2005 Mediterranean Games in Almería, Spain with a total number of 49 participants (42 men and 7 women).

== Medals ==
Medal	Name	Sport	Event
Gold	Arnela Odžaković	Karate	Women's 65 kg
Silver	Adnan Hadzic	Karate	Men's 75 kg
Silver	Markica Dodig	Bocce	Men's Precision throw
Bronze	Hamza Alić	Athletics	Men's Shot Put
Bronze	Amel Mekić	Judo	Men's 100 kg
Bronze	Merima Softić	Karate	Women's Open

== Boxing ==
Athlete	Event	Round of 16	Quarterfinals	Semifinals	Final
Athlete	Event	Opposition Result	Opposition Result	Opposition Result	Opposition Result
Emir Telalović	64 kg	BYE	Piperski (SCG); L 18–32	Did not advance	
Halid Ranica	81 kg	BYE	Tarhan (TUR); L RSCH	Did not advance	
Memnun Hadžić	91 kg	BYE	Homrani (TUN); L 9–22	Did not advance	
Esmir Kukić	+91 kg	BYE	Shouman (EGY); L 16–20	Did not advance	
