= Diving at the Mediterranean Games =

Diving was one of the sports at the Mediterranean Games. It has been held from the first edition in 1951 to the eleventh edition in 1991.

== Editions ==
| Games | Year | Host city | Host country | Events | Best nation |
|---|---|---|---|---|---|
| I | 1951 | Alexandria | Egypt | 2 | Egypt (EGY) |
| II | 1955 | Barcelona | Spain | 2 | Egypt (EGY) |
| III | 1959 | Beirut | Lebanon | 2 | United Arab Republic (UAR) |
| IV | 1963 | Naples | Italy | 2 | Italy (ITA) |
| VI | 1971 | İzmir | Turkey | 2 | Italy (ITA) |
| VII | 1975 | Algiers | Algeria | 3 | Italy (ITA) |
| VIII | 1979 | Split | Yugoslavia | 4 | Italy (ITA) |
| IX | 1983 | Casablanca | Morocco | 3 | Italy (ITA) |
| X | 1987 | Latakia | Syria | 4 | Italy (ITA) |
| XI | 1991 | Athens | Greece | 2 | Spain (ESP) |

=== All-time medal table ===
| Rank | Nation | Gold | Silver | Bronze | Total |
|---|---|---|---|---|---|
| 1 | Italy (ITA) | 16 | 14 | 5 | 35 |
| 2 | France (FRA) | 5 | 4 | 3 | 12 |
| 3 | Spain (ESP) | 2 | 4 | 8 | 14 |
| 4 | Egypt (EGY) | 2 | 2 | 9 | 13 |
| 5 | United Arab Republic (UAR) | 1 | 1 | 1 | 3 |
| 6 | Yugoslavia (YUG) | 0 | 1 | 0 | 1 |
| Totals (6 entries) | | 26 | 26 | 26 | 78 |
