= United Arab Republic at the 1963 Mediterranean Games =

- IOC code: UAR
- NOC: United Arab Republic Olympic Committee

in Naples
- Medals Ranked 6th: Gold 5 Silver 14 Bronze 12 Total 31

Mediterranean Games appearances (overview)
- 1959; 1963

Other related appearances
- Egypt (1951–1955, 1971–pres.); Syria (1951–1955, 1963–pres.)

United Arab Republic containing Egypt only participated at the 1963 Mediterranean Games held in Naples, Italy.
