= Syria at the 2001 Mediterranean Games =

- IOC code: SYR
- NOC: Syrian Olympic Committee

in Tunis
- Competitors: 76
- Medals Ranked 14th: Gold 0 Silver 5 Bronze 4 Total 9

Mediterranean Games appearances (overview)
- 1951; 1955; 1959; 1963; 1967; 1971; 1975; 1979; 1983; 1987; 1991; 1993; 1997; 2001; 2005; 2009; 2013; 2018; 2022

Other related appearances
- United Arab Republic (1959)

Syria competed at the 2001 Mediterranean Games in Tunis, Tunisia. The medal tally was 9.

== Medals by sport ==
Sport	Gold	Silver	Bronze	Total
Wrestling	0	3	1	4
Boxing	0	2	1	3
Weightlifting	0	0	2	2
Totals (3 entries)	0	5	4	9

== Medalists ==
Medal	Name	Sport	Event
Silver	Youssef Hamidi	Boxing	60 kg
Silver	Ahmed Winar	Boxing	+91 kg
Silver	Firas Al-Rifaie	Wrestling	Freestyle 54 kg
Silver	Ahmad Al Ossta	Wrestling	Freestyle 69 kg
Silver	Yasser Saleh	Wrestling	Greco-Roman 69 kg
Bronze	Abdullah Waheb	Boxing	54 kg
Bronze	Khajik Khajouiane	Weightlifting	85 kg snatch
Bronze	Mohamed Sheikh Ali	Weightlifting	105 kg snatch
Bronze	Zakaria Al-Nashid	Wrestling	Greco-Roman 63 kg
