= Wrestling at the 2026 Mediterranean Games – Men's Greco-Roman 60 kg =

Wrestling competitions

Men's Greco-Roman 60 kg at the 2026 Mediterranean Games
- Venue: PalaWojtyla
- Date: 22–23 August
- Competitors: 9 from 9 nations

Medalists
gold medal	Abdelkarim Fergat	Algeria
silver medal	Mahmoud Farrag Saad	Egypt
bronze medal	Yazid Gharbi	Morocco
bronze medal	Mhdasad Aldein Alosta	Syria

The Men's Greco-Roman 60 kg competition of the wrestling events at the 2026 Mediterranean Games in Martina Franca, Italy, was held from 22 to 23 August at the PalaWojtyla.

== Results ==
Legend

- F — Won by fall

Round of 16
Gabriele Pucher (ITA)	9
Bajram Sina (ALB)	0

Quarterfinals
Abdelkarim Fergat (ALG)	7
Gabriele Pucher (ITA)	0
Vasileios Tsarouchas (GRE)	0
Yazid Gharbi (MAR)	6
Ilian Ainaoui (FRA)	0
Mahmoud Farrag Saad (EGY)	8
Mhdasad Aldein Alosta (SYR)	8
Ekrem Öztürk (TUR)	4

Semifinals
Abdelkarim Fergat (ALG)	3
Yazid Gharbi (MAR)	1
Mahmoud Farrag Saad (EGY)	9
Mhdasad Aldein Alosta (SYR)	1

Final
Abdelkarim Fergat (ALG)	10
Mahmoud Farrag Saad (EGY)	1

Bronze medals
Gabriele Pucher (ITA)	0
Yazid Gharbi (MAR)	8
Ilian Ainaoui (FRA)	1
Mhdasad Aldein Alosta (SYR)	3
