= Bosnia and Herzegovina at the 2009 Mediterranean Games =

- IOC code: BIH
- NOC: Olympic Committee of Bosnia and Herzegovina

in Pescara
- Medals Ranked 19th: Gold 0 Silver 3 Bronze 5 Total 8

Mediterranean Games appearances (overview)
- 1993; 1997; 2001; 2005; 2009; 2013; 2018; 2022

Other related appearances
- Yugoslavia (1951–1991)

Bosnia and Herzegovina competed at the 2009 Mediterranean Games held in Pescara, Italy. It won 3 silver and 5 bronze medals.

== Wrestling ==
Greco-Roman

Athlete	Event	1/8 Final	Quarterfinal	Semifinal	Final	Repechage Round 1	Bronze Medal Bout
Athlete	Event	Opposition Result	Opposition Result	Opposition Result	Opposition Result	Opposition Result	Opposition Result
Dragan Markovic	74 kg	Žugaj (CRO); L 7–0, 2–0	did not advance				
Haris Tajić	84 kg	Bye	Sernek (SLO); L 3–0, 2–0	did not advance			
