= Syria at the 1955 Mediterranean Games =

- IOC code: SYR
- NOC: Syrian Olympic Committee

in Barcelona
- Medals Ranked 8th: Gold 0 Silver 0 Bronze 1 Total 1

Mediterranean Games appearances (overview)
- 1951; 1955; 1959; 1963; 1967; 1971; 1975; 1979; 1983; 1987; 1991; 1993; 1997; 2001; 2005; 2009; 2013; 2018; 2022

Other related appearances
- United Arab Republic (1959)

Syria (SYR) competed at the 1955 Mediterranean Games in Barcelona, Spain. The medal tally was 1.

== See also ==
- Syria at the 1963 Mediterranean Games
