= Portugal at the Mediterranean Games =

- IOC code: POR
- NOC: Olympic Committee of Portugal
- Medals Ranked 17th: Gold 26 Silver 25 Bronze 30 Total 81

Mediterranean Games appearances (overview)
- 1951; 1955; 1959; 1963; 1967; 1971; 1975; 1979; 1983; 1987; 1991; 1993; 1997; 2001; 2005; 2009; 2013; 2018; 2022; 2026

Portugal has competed at every celebration of the Mediterranean Games since the 2018 Mediterranean Games. As of 2026, Portuguese athletes have won a total of 81 medals.

== Medal tables ==
=== Medals by Mediterranean Games ===
Host nation

| Games | Athletes | Gold | Silver | Bronze | Total | Rank |
|---|---|---|---|---|---|---|
| 2018 Tarragona | 233 | 3 | 8 | 13 | 24 | 13 |
| 2022 Oran | 163 | 7 | 10 | 8 | 25 | 9 |
| 2026 Taranto | 172 | 16 | 7 | 9 | 32 | 8 |
| Total | | 26 | 25 | 30 | 81 | 17 |

=== Medals by sport ===
Leading in that sport

| Sport | Gold | Silver | Bronze | Total |
|---|---|---|---|---|
| Athletics | 9 | 6 | 5 | 20 |
| Swimming | 6 | 6 | 8 | 20 |
| Canoeing | 2 | 4 | 1 | 7 |
| Cycling | 2 | 3 | 2 | 7 |
| Triathlon | 2 | 0 | 0 | 2 |
| Judo | 1 | 0 | 2 | 3 |
| Equestrian | 1 | 0 | 0 | 1 |
| Football | 1 | 0 | 0 | 1 |
| Karate | 1 | 0 | 0 | 1 |
| Padel | 1 | 0 | 0 | 1 |
| Table tennis | 0 | 2 | 3 | 5 |
| Rowing | 0 | 1 | 2 | 3 |
| Roller speed skating | 0 | 1 | 1 | 2 |
| Shooting | 0 | 1 | 1 | 2 |
| Taekwondo | 0 | 1 | 1 | 2 |
| Fencing | 0 | 0 | 2 | 2 |
| 3x3 basketball | 0 | 0 | 1 | 1 |
| Gymnastics | 0 | 0 | 1 | 1 |
| Totals (18 entries) | 26 | 25 | 30 | 81 |

== See also ==
- Portugal at the Olympics
- Portugal at the Paralympics
- Sports in Portugal
