= Vildan Doğan =

Turkish karateka (born 1984)

- Born: September 5, 1984 (age 40); Istanbul, Turkey
- Nationality: Turkish
- Division: Open
- Style: Karate Kumite
- Team: Istanbul BB SK

Medal record

Women's Karate

World Championships
Bronze medal – third place	2008 Tokyo	Kumite -60 kg
Gold medal – first place	2004 Monterrey	Kumite team

European Championships
Silver medal – second place	2007 Bratislava	Kumite -60 kg
Bronze medal – third place	2005 Tenerife	Kumite -60 kg

Mediterranean Games
Bronze medal – third place	2009 Pescara	Kumite -61 kg
Bronze medal – third place	2005 Almeria	Kumite -50 kg

Tournaments
Silver medal – second place	2005 Monza	Kumite -53 kg

World Junior and Cadet Championships
Bronze medal – third place	2003 Marseille	Kumite -53 kg

Vildan Doğan (born September 5, 1984, in Istanbul, Turkey) is a Turkish karateka competing in the kumite -60 kg division. She is a member of the İstanbul Büyükşehir Belediyesi S.K.

== Achievements ==
2010

- Bronze 1st World Clubs Cup – November 20, Istanbul TUR – kumite team
- Gold 14th Balkan Children & Senior Karate Championships – September 24, Loutraki GRE – kumite -61 kg
- Silver 14th Balkan Children & Senior Karate Championships – September 24, Loutraki GRE – kumite team

2009

- Bronze 16th Mediterranean Games – June 25-July 5, Pescara ITA – kumite -61 kg

2008

- Bronze 19th World Championships – November 13, Tokyo JPN – kumite -60 kg

2007

- Silver 42nd European Championships – May 4, Bratislava SVK – kumite -60 kg

2005

- Bronze 15th Mediterranean Games – June 25, Almeria ESP – kumite -50 kg
- Bronze 40th European Championships – May 13, Tenerife ESP – kumite -60 kg
- Silver Italian Open – April 8, Monza NED – kumite -53 kg

2004

- Gold 17th World Championships – November 18, Monterrey MEX – kumite team
- Bronze 31st European Cadet & Junior Karate Championships – February 13 – kumite junior -53 kg

2003

- Bronze 3rd World Junior & Cadet Karate Championships – October 24, Marseille FRA – kumite -53 kg

2002

- Gold 9th Balkan Senior Karate Championships – September 28 – kumite -60 kg
- Bronze 9th Balkan Senior Karate Championships – September 28 – kumite team
