= Archery at the Mediterranean Games =

Archery competition

Archery is one of the sports at the quadrennial Mediterranean Games competition. It has been a sport in the program of the Mediterranean Games since the event's eighth edition in 1979.

== Editions ==
Games	Year	Host city	Host country	Events	Best nation
VIII	1979	Split	Yugoslavia	2	Italy (ITA)
XII	1993	Languedoc-Roussilon	France	4	France (FRA)
XIII	1997	Bari	Italy	3	France (FRA)
XV	2005	Almería	Spain	3	Italy (ITA)
XVII	2013	Mersin	Turkey	4	Italy (ITA)
XVIII	2018	Tarragona	Spain	4	France (FRA)
XIX	2022	Oran	Algeria	5	Turkey (TUR)
XX	2026	Taranto	Italy	5	France (FRA)

=== All-time medal table ===
Updated after the most recent 2026 Mediterranean Games

Rank	Nation	Gold	Silver	Bronze	Total
1	France (FRA)	13	4	10	27
2	Italy (ITA)	7	13	5	25
3	Turkey (TUR)	5	4	5	14
4	Spain (ESP)	4	7	8	19
5	Egypt (EGY)	1	0	0	1
6	Slovenia (SLO)	0	2	2	4
Totals (6 entries)		30	30	30	90
