= Judo at the 2022 Mediterranean Games – Men's 60 kg =

Judo competitions

Judo Men's 60 kg at the 2022 Mediterranean Games
- Venue: Mohammed Ben Ahmed Convention Centre
- Location: Oran, Algeria
- Date: 29 June
- Competitors: 12 from 12 nations

Medalists
gold medal	Francisco Garrigós	Spain
silver medal	Fraj Dhouibi	Tunisia
bronze medal	Youssry Samy	Egypt
bronze medal	Issam Bassou	Morocco

The men's 60 kg competition in judo at the 2022 Mediterranean Games was held on 29 June at the Mohammed Ben Ahmed Convention Centre in Oran.

== Results ==
=== Main bracket ===
Round of 16
Bilal Yagoubi (ALG)	10
Giorgos Korotzidis (CYP)	00
Mihraç Akkuş (TUR)	10
Diego Rea (ITA)	00
Maxime Merlin (FRA)	10
Ricardo Pires (POR)	00
David Štarkel (SLO)	00
Suleiman Al-Refai (SYR)	01

Quarterfinals
Francisco Garrigós (ESP)	10
Bilal Yagoubi (ALG)	00
Issam Bassou (MAR)	10
Mihraç Akkuş (TUR)	00
Fraj Dhouibi (TUN)	10
Maxime Merlin (FRA)	00
Youssry Samy (EGY)	10
Suleiman Al-Refai (SYR)	00

Semifinals
Francisco Garrigós (ESP)	10
Issam Bassou (MAR)	00
Fraj Dhouibi (TUN)	01
Youssry Samy (EGY)	00

Final
Francisco Garrigós (ESP)	10
Fraj Dhouibi (TUN)	00

=== Repechage ===
Repechage
Bilal Yagoubi (ALG)	10
Mihraç Akkuş (TUR)	00
Maxime Merlin (FRA)	10
Suleiman Al-Refai (SYR)	00

Bronze medal
Bilal Yagoubi (ALG)	00
Youssry Samy (EGY)	10
Maxime Merlin (FRA)	00
Issam Bassou (MAR)	01
