= Wrestling at the 2026 Mediterranean Games – Men's freestyle 57 kg =

Wrestling competitions

Men's Freestyle 57 kg at the 2026 Mediterranean Games
- Venue: PalaWojtyla
- Date: 23–24 August
- Competitors: 5 from 5 nations

Medalists
gold medal	Muhammet Karavuş	Turkey
silver medal	Rassoul Galbouraev	France
bronze medal	Ibrahim Al-Tabbaa	Syria

The men's freestyle 57 kg competition at the 2026 Mediterranean Games in Martina Franca, Italy, was held from 23 to 24 August at the PalaWojtyla.

== Results ==
Pos	Athlete	Pld	W	L	CP	TP
1	Muhammet Karavuş (TUR)	4	4	0	15	40
2	Rassoul Galbouraev (FRA)	4	3	1	13	34
3	Ibrahim Al-Tabbaa (SYR)	4	2	2	6	15
4	Angelo Pirrone (ITA)	4	1	3	6	2
5	Mehmet Usinov (MKD)	4	0	4	1	2

Source: Taranto 2026

	Score		CP
Mehmet Usinov (MKD)	0–6	Ibrahim Al-Tabbaa (SYR)	0–3 VPO
Muhammet Karavuş (TUR)	8–2	Rassoul Galbouraev (FRA)	3–1 VPO1
Rassoul Galbouraev (FRA)	10–0	Mehmet Usinov (MKD)	4–0 VSU
Angelo Pirrone (ITA)	0–10	Muhammet Karavuş (TUR)	0–4 VSU
Ibrahim Al-Tabbaa (SYR)	0–10	Muhammet Karavuş (TUR)	0–4 VSU
Angelo Pirrone (ITA)	0–11	Rassoul Galbouraev (FRA)	0–4 VSU
Mehmet Usinov (MKD)	2–12	Muhammet Karavuş (TUR)	1–4 VSU
Ibrahim Al-Tabbaa (SYR)	9–2	Angelo Pirrone (ITA)	3–1 VPO1
Rassoul Galbouraev (FRA)	11–0	Ibrahim Al-Tabbaa (SYR)	4–0 VSU
Mehmet Usinov (MKD)	0–0	Angelo Pirrone (ITA)	0–5 VIN
