= Syria at the 2018 Mediterranean Games =

- IOC code: SYR
- NOC: Syrian Olympic Committee

in Tarragona, Spain
- Competitors: 33 in 11 sports
- Flag bearer: Ahmad Hamcho
- Medals Ranked 16th: Gold 2 Silver 2 Bronze 3 Total 7

Mediterranean Games appearances (overview)
- 1951; 1955; 1959; 1963; 1967; 1971; 1975; 1979; 1983; 1987; 1991; 1993; 1997; 2001; 2005; 2009; 2013; 2018; 2022

Other related appearances
- United Arab Republic (1959)

Syria competed at the 2018 Mediterranean Games in Tarragona, Spain from 22 June to 1 July 2018.

== Medals ==
Medal	Name	Sport	Event	Date
Gold	Majd Eddin Ghazal	Athletics	Men's High Jump	29 June
Gold	Ahmed Ghousoon	Boxing	Men's middleweight	30 June
Silver	Ali Al Hazzaa	Weightlifting	Men's 94 kg Clean & Jerk	27 June
Silver	Hussein Al Masri	Boxing	Men's flyweight	30 June
Bronze	Abdul Karim al-Hassan	Wrestling	Men's 67 kg	26 June
Bronze	Majd Hassan	Weightlifting	Men's 105 kg Clean & Jerk	26 June
Bronze	Mohamad Mulayes	Boxing	Men's super heavyweight	30 June

Medals by sport
Sport	1st place, gold medalist(s)	2nd place, silver medalist(s)	3rd place, bronze medalist(s)	Total
Athletics	1	0	0	1
Box	1	1	1	3
Weightlifting	0	1	1	2
Wrestling	0	0	1	1
Total	2	2	3	7

== Weightlifting ==
Ali Alhazzaa won the silver medal in the men's 94 kg Clean & Jerk event. Majd Hassan won the bronze medal in the men's 105 kg Clean & Jerk event.
