= Boxing at the 2022 Mediterranean Games – Men's middleweight =

Boxing competitions

Men's middleweight boxing at the 2022 Mediterranean Games
- Venue: EMEC Hall
- Date: 26 June – 1 July
- Competitors: 14 from 14 nations

Medalists
gold medal	Ahmad Ghossoun	Syria
silver medal	Younes Nemouchi	Algeria
bronze medal	Moreno Fendero	France
bronze medal	Salvatore Cavallaro	Italy

The men's middleweight (75 kg) competition of the boxing events at the 2022 Mediterranean Games in Oran, Algeria, was held from 26 June to 1 July at the EMEC Hall.

Like all Mediterranean Games boxing events, the competition was a straight single-elimination tournament. Both semifinal losers were awarded bronze medals, so no boxers competed again after their first loss.

== Results ==
Round of 16
Almir Memić (SRB)	RSC
Ali Hashem (LBN)
Moreno Fendero (FRA)	3
Arjon Kajoshi (ALB)	0
Asim Dawku (LBA)	0
Aly Abdalla (EGY)	3
Salvatore Cavallaro (ITA)	WO
Petar Knežević (CRO)
Mohamed Aziz Touati (TUN)	0
Zine El Abidine Amroug (MAR)	3
Younes Nemouchi (ALG)	3
Miguel Cuadrado (ESP)	0
Leo Cvitanović (BIH)	3
Serhat Güler (TUR)	0

Quarterfinals
Ahmad Ghossoun (SYR)	2
Almir Memić (SRB)	1
Moreno Fendero (FRA)	3
Aly Abdalla (EGY)	0
Salvatore Cavallaro (ITA)	2
Zine El Abidine Amroug (MAR)	1
Younes Nemouchi (ALG)	3
Leo Cvitanović (BIH)	0

Semifinals
Ahmad Ghossoun (SYR)	3
Moreno Fendero (FRA)	0
Salvatore Cavallaro (ITA)	1
Younes Nemouchi (ALG)	2

Final
Ahmad Ghossoun (SYR)	2
Younes Nemouchi (ALG)	1
