= Weightlifting at the 2013 Mediterranean Games – Men's 105 kg =

The men's 105 kg competition of the weightlifting events at the 2013 Mediterranean Games in Mersin, Turkey, was held on June 26 at the Erdemli Sports Hall.

Each lifter performed in both the snatch and clean and jerk lifts, with the final score being the sum of the lifter's best result in each. The athlete received three attempts in each of the two lifts; the score for the lift was the heaviest weight successfully lifted. This weightlifting event was the lightest men's event at the weightlifting competition, limiting competitors to a maximum of 105 kilograms of body mass.

== Schedule ==
All times are Eastern European Summer Time (UTC+3).

Date	Time	Round
June 26, 2013	12:00	Final

== Results ==
8 athletes from five countries will take part.

=== Snatch ===
Rank	Name	Group	B.weight (kg)	Snatch (kg)
1st place, gold medalist(s)	David Kavelasvili (GRE)	A	102.60	173
2nd place, silver medalist(s)	Ahed Jugheli (SYR)	A	104.25	172
3rd place, bronze medalist(s)	Walid Bidani (ALG)	A	104.35	171
4	Gaber Mohamed (EGY)	A	102.35	169
5	Ahmed Sellou (EGY)	A	103.20	166
6	Abdulmoneim Elwaddani (LBA)	A	104.25	152
7	Efstathios Stroumpis (GRE)	A	103.20	150
8	Pietro Giovanni Noto (ITA)	A	97.65	142

=== Clean & Jerk ===
Rank	Name	Group	B.weight (kg)	Clean & Jerk (kg)
1st place, gold medalist(s)	David Kavelasvili (GRE)	A	102.60	215
2nd place, silver medalist(s)	Ahed Jugheli (SYR)	A	104.25	212
3rd place, bronze medalist(s)	Gaber Mohamed (EGY)	A	102.35	203
4	Efstathios Stroumpis (GRE)	A	103.20	203
5	Ahmed Sellou (EGY)	A	103.20	201
6	Abdulmoneim Elwaddani (LBA)	A	104.25	180
7	Pietro Giovanni Noto (ITA)	A	97.65	170
—	Walid Bidani (ALG)	A	104.35	—
