= Taekwondo at the Mediterranean Games =

Judo competition

Taekwondo is one of the sports at the quadrennial Mediterranean Games competition. It has been a sport in the program of the Mediterranean Games since 2013.

== Editions ==
Games	Host city	Taekwondo events			Winner of the medal table	Second in the medal table	Third in the medal table
Games	Host city	Men	Women	Total	Winner of the medal table	Second in the medal table	Third in the medal table
XVII	Mersin	4	4	8	Spain (ESP)	Turkey (TUR)	Morocco (MAR)
XVIII	Tarragona	4	4	8	Spain (ESP)	Turkey (TUR)	Croatia (CRO)
XIX	Oran	4	4	8	Turkey (TUR)	Spain (ESP)	Croatia (CRO)
XX	Taranto	4	4	8	Turkey (TUR)	Morocco (MAR); Tunisia (TUN)	—

== All-time medal table ==
Updated after the most recent 2026 Mediterranean Games

Rank	Nation	Gold	Silver	Bronze	Total
1	Turkey (TUR)	12	3	10	25
2	Spain (ESP)	9	3	6	18
3	Croatia (CRO)	3	4	6	13
4	Morocco (MAR)	2	6	4	12
5	France (FRA)	2	3	7	12
6	Egypt (EGY)	2	3	4	9
7	Tunisia (TUN)	1	3	3	7
8	Serbia (SRB)	1	2	5	8
9	Greece (GRE)	0	2	4	6
10	Italy (ITA)	0	1	5	6
11	North Macedonia (MKD)	0	1	1	2
11	Portugal (POR)	0	1	1	2
13	Slovenia (SLO)	0	0	3	3
14	Algeria (ALG)	0	0	1	1
14	Andorra (AND)	0	0	1	1
14	Bosnia and Herzegovina (BIH)	0	0	1	1
14	Cyprus (CYP)	0	0	1	1
14	Lebanon (LBN)	0	0	1	1
Totals (18 entries)		32	32	64	128

== Best results by event and nation ==
Event	(Algeria) ALG	(Andorra) AND	(Bosnia and Herzegovina) BIH	(Croatia) CRO	(Cyprus) CYP	(Egypt) EGY	(Spain) ESP	(France) FRA	(Greece) GRE	(Italy) ITA	(Lebanon) LBN	(Morocco) MAR	(North Macedonia) MKD	(Portugal) POR	(Slovenia) SLO	(Serbia) SRB	(Tunisia) TUN	(Turkey) TUR
Men's
Flyweight (58kg)	3rd place, bronze medalist(s)			2nd place, silver medalist(s)			1st place, gold medalist(s)	2nd place, silver medalist(s)		3rd place, bronze medalist(s)		2nd place, silver medalist(s)		2nd place, silver medalist(s)	3rd place, bronze medalist(s)	3rd place, bronze medalist(s)	3rd place, bronze medalist(s)	1st place, gold medalist(s)
Lightweight (68 kg)				3rd place, bronze medalist(s)			1st place, gold medalist(s)	1st place, gold medalist(s)	2nd place, silver medalist(s)	2nd place, silver medalist(s)						3rd place, bronze medalist(s)	2nd place, silver medalist(s)	2nd place, silver medalist(s)
Middleweight (80 kg)				3rd place, bronze medalist(s)		1st place, gold medalist(s)	1st place, gold medalist(s)		3rd place, bronze medalist(s)			1st place, gold medalist(s)		3rd place, bronze medalist(s)		3rd place, bronze medalist(s)	1st place, gold medalist(s)	3rd place, bronze medalist(s)
Heavyweight (+80 kg)				1st place, gold medalist(s)			1st place, gold medalist(s)	3rd place, bronze medalist(s)	2nd place, silver medalist(s)	3rd place, bronze medalist(s)		1st place, gold medalist(s)	2nd place, silver medalist(s)			3rd place, bronze medalist(s)		1st place, gold medalist(s)
Women's
Flyweight (49 kg)		3rd place, bronze medalist(s)		2nd place, silver medalist(s)	3rd place, bronze medalist(s)	2nd place, silver medalist(s)	2nd place, silver medalist(s)	3rd place, bronze medalist(s)				3rd place, bronze medalist(s)			3rd place, bronze medalist(s)	3rd place, bronze medalist(s)		1st place, gold medalist(s)
Lightweight (57 kg)			3rd place, bronze medalist(s)	3rd place, bronze medalist(s)		2nd place, silver medalist(s)	1st place, gold medalist(s)	3rd place, bronze medalist(s)		3rd place, bronze medalist(s)	3rd place, bronze medalist(s)	2nd place, silver medalist(s)					3rd place, bronze medalist(s)	1st place, gold medalist(s)
Middleweight (67 kg)				1st place, gold medalist(s)		3rd place, bronze medalist(s)	2nd place, silver medalist(s)	2nd place, silver medalist(s)	3rd place, bronze medalist(s)			2nd place, silver medalist(s)			3rd place, bronze medalist(s)		2nd place, silver medalist(s)	1st place, gold medalist(s)
Heavyweight (+67 kg)				3rd place, bronze medalist(s)			3rd place, bronze medalist(s)	1st place, gold medalist(s)	3rd place, bronze medalist(s)			2nd place, silver medalist(s)				1st place, gold medalist(s)		1st place, gold medalist(s)
