= Egypt at the Mediterranean Games =

- IOC code: EGY
- NOC: Egyptian Olympic Committee
- Medals Ranked 7th: Gold 156 Silver 209 Bronze 255 Total 620

Mediterranean Games appearances (overview)
- 1951; 1955; 1959–1967; 1971; 1975; 1979; 1983; 1987; 1991; 1993; 1997; 2001; 2005; 2009; 2013; 2018; 2022; 2026

Other related appearances
- United Arab Republic (1959, 1963)

Egypt has competed at every celebration of the Mediterranean Games since the 1951 Mediterranean Games. As of 2022, the Egyptian athletes have won a total of 620 medals.

== Medal count ==
Host nation

Below the table representing all Egyptian 's medals around the games. Till now, Egypt win 678 medals achieving 7th place in the Games record.

Games	Athletes	Gold	Silver	Bronze	Total	Rank	Notes
1951 Alexandria	243	20	26	19	65	3	details
1955 Barcelona	169	9	20	17	46	4	details
1959 Beirut	as part of United Arab Republic						
1963 Naples	144	5	13	9	27	5	details
1967 Tunis	did not participate						
1971 İzmir	109	7	10	12	29	6	details
1975 Algiers	124	6	12	15	33	7	details
1979 Split	205	3	9	10	22	7	details
1983 Casablanca	189	1	9	12	22	10	details
1987 Latakia	61	4	4	6	14	10	details
1991 Athens	156	8	10	17	35	8	details
1993 Languedoc-Roussillon	57	4	9	16	29	10	details
1997 Bari	43	3	6	10	19	11	details
2001 Tunis	69	7	13	17	37	8	details
2005 Almería	137	15	10	18	43	5	details
2009 Pescara	70	11	11	12	34	7	details
2013 Mersin	40	21	22	24	67	5	details
2018 Tarragona	177	18	11	16	45	5	details
2022 Oran	191	13	15	23	51	6	details
2026 Taranto	196	23	16	19	58	5	details
Total		179	225	274	678	7	

== Medals by sport ==
Update to 2022 Mediterranean Games

Sport	Gold	Silver	Bronze	Total
Archery	1	0	0	1
Athletics	6	14	20	40
Badminton	0	0	1	1
Basketball	1	0	2	3
Boxing	27	25	37	89
Diving	1	1	5	7
Equestrian	0	1	3	4
Fencing	2	3	7	12
Football	1	1	1	3
Gymnastics	5	5	13	23
Handball	1	2	0	3
Judo	9	7	16	32
Karate	7	13	17	37
Rowing	1	5	8	14
Sailing	0	0	1	1
Shooting	1	1	2	4
Swimming	5	7	10	22
Table tennis	3	1	1	5
Taekwondo	2	3	4	9
Tennis	0	3	0	3
Volleyball	1	0	0	1
Water polo	0	1	1	2
Weightlifting	53	54	54	161
Wrestling	18	49	46	113

== See also ==
- Egypt at the Olympics
- Egypt at the Paralympics
- Egypt at the African Games
- Sports in Egypt
