= Weightlifting at the 2013 Mediterranean Games – Women's +75 kg =

The women's +75 kg competition of the weightlifting events at the 2013 Mediterranean Games in Mersin, Turkey, was held on June 25 at the Erdemli Sports Hall.

Each lifter performed in both the snatch and clean and jerk lifts, with the final score being the sum of the lifter's best result in each. The athlete received three attempts in each of the two lifts; the score for the lift was the heaviest weight successfully lifted. This weightlifting event was the lightest men's event at the weightlifting competition, limiting competitors to a maximum of +75 kilograms of body mass.

== Schedule ==
All times are Eastern European Summer Time (UTC+3).

Date	Time	Round
June 25, 2013	18:00	Final

== Results ==
4 athletes from five countries will take part.

=== Snatch ===
Rank	Name	Group	B.weight (kg)	Snatch (kg)
1st place, gold medalist(s)	Shaimaa Haridy (EGY)	A	115.20	110
2nd place, silver medalist(s)	Halima Abbas (EGY)	A	116.15	110
3rd place, bronze medalist(s)	Marwa Jlassi (TUN)	A	115.95	95
4	Olivera Juric (BIH)	A	75.55	82

=== Clean & Jerk ===
Rank	Name	Group	B.weight (kg)	Clean & Jerk (kg)
1st place, gold medalist(s)	Shaimaa Haridy (EGY)	A	115.20	135
2nd place, silver medalist(s)	Halima Abbas (EGY)	A	116.15	132
3rd place, bronze medalist(s)	Marwa Jlassi (TUN)	A	115.95	131
4	Olivera Juric (BIH)	A	75.55	100
