= Syria at the 2013 Mediterranean Games =

- IOC code: SYR
- NOC: Syrian Olympic Committee

in Mersin
- Medals Ranked 18th: Gold 0 Silver 2 Bronze 0 Total 2

Mediterranean Games appearances (overview)
- 1951; 1955; 1959; 1963; 1967; 1971; 1975; 1979; 1983; 1987; 1991; 1993; 1997; 2001; 2005; 2009; 2013; 2018; 2022

Other related appearances
- United Arab Republic (1959)

Syria competed at the 2013 Mediterranean Games in Mersin, Turkey from the 20–30 June 2013.

== Medal table ==
Medal	Name	Sport	Event	Date
Silver	Ahed Joughili	Weightlifting	Men's 105 kg Snatch	26 June
Silver	Ahed Joughili	Weightlifting	Men's 105 kg Clean & Jerk	26 June

Medals by sport
Sport	1st place, gold medalist(s)	2nd place, silver medalist(s)	3rd place, bronze medalist(s)	Total
Weightlifting	0	2	0	2
Total	0	2	0	2
