= Syria at the 1971 Mediterranean Games =

- IOC code: SYR
- NOC: Syrian Olympic Committee

in İzmir
- Medals Ranked 9th: Gold 0 Silver 2 Bronze 6 Total 8

Mediterranean Games appearances (overview)
- 1951; 1955; 1959; 1963; 1967; 1971; 1975; 1979; 1983; 1987; 1991; 1993; 1997; 2001; 2005; 2009; 2013; 2018; 2022

Other related appearances
- United Arab Republic (1959)

Syria (SYR) competed at the 1971 Mediterranean Games in İzmir, Turkey. The medal tally was 8.

== See also ==
- Syria at the 1975 Mediterranean Games
