= Boxing at the 2022 Mediterranean Games – Men's featherweight =

Boxing competitions

Men's featherweight boxing at the 2022 Mediterranean Games
- Venue: EMEC Hall
- Date: 27 June – 1 July
- Competitors: 11 from 11 nations

Medalists
gold medal	Batuhan Çiftçi	Turkey
silver medal	Oussama Mordjane	Algeria
bronze medal	Bilel Mhamdi	Tunisia
bronze medal	Abdellatif Zouhairi	Morocco

The men's featherweight (57 kg) competition of the boxing events at the 2022 Mediterranean Games in Oran, Algeria, was held from 27 June to 1 July at the EMEC Hall.

Like all Mediterranean Games boxing events, the competition was a straight single-elimination tournament. Both semifinal losers were awarded bronze medals, so no boxers competed again after their first loss.

== Results ==
Round of 16
Abdellatif Zouhairi (MAR)	3
Ardit Murja (ALB)	0
Oussama Mordjane (ALG)	3
Francesco Iozia (ITA)	0
Lorent Murati (KOS)	1
Belal Joukhdar (SYR)	2

Quarterfinals
Omar Abozaid (EGY)	1
Abdellatif Zouhairi (MAR)	2
Batuhan Çiftçi (TUR)	3
Antonio Barrul (ESP)	0
Alen Rahimić (BIH)	0
Oussama Mordjane (ALG)	3
Belal Joukhdar (SYR)	0
Bilel Mhamdi (TUN)	3

Semifinals
Abdellatif Zouhairi (MAR)	0
Batuhan Çiftçi (TUR)	3
Oussama Mordjane (ALG)	2
Bilel Mhamdi (TUN)	0

Final
Batuhan Çiftçi (TUR)	3
Oussama Mordjane (ALG)	0
