= Bosnia and Herzegovina at the 2022 Mediterranean Games =

- IOC code: BIH
- NOC: Olympic Committee of Bosnia and Herzegovina

in Oran, Algeria
- Competitors: 48 in 11 sports
- Flag bearers: Lana Pudar, Džemal Bošnjak
- Medals Ranked 19th: Gold 2 Silver 0 Bronze 6 Total 8

Mediterranean Games appearances (overview)
- 1993; 1997; 2001; 2005; 2009; 2013; 2018; 2022; 2026

Other related appearances
- Yugoslavia (1951–1991)

Bosnia and Herzegovina competed at the 2022 Mediterranean Games in Oran, Algeria from 25 June to 6 July 2022.

== Medal summary ==
=== Medal table ===
Medal	Name	Sport	Event	Date
Gold	Lana Pudar	Swimming	Women's 200 m butterfly	1 July
Gold	Lana Pudar	Swimming	Women's 100 m butterfly	4 July
Bronze	Nejra Sipović	Karate	Women's 61 kg	26 June
Bronze	Hamza Turulja	Karate	Men's 75 kg	26 June
Bronze	Rijad Džuho	Karate	Men's +84 kg	27 June
Bronze	Anđela Samardžić	Judo	Women's 57 kg	29 June
Bronze	Toni Miletić	Judo	Men's 90 kg	1 July
Bronze	Larisa Cerić	Judo	Women's +78 kg	1 July

Medals by sport
Sport	1st place, gold medalist(s)	2nd place, silver medalist(s)	3rd place, bronze medalist(s)	Total
Judo	0	0	3	3
Karate	0	0	3	3
Swimming	2	0	0	2
Total	2	0	6	8

Medals by date
Day	Date	1st place, gold medalist(s)	2nd place, silver medalist(s)	3rd place, bronze medalist(s)	Total
1	26 June	0	0	2	2
2	27 June	0	0	1	1
4	29 June	0	0	1	1
6	1 July	1	0	2	3
9	4 July	1	0	0	1
Total		2	0	6	8

Medals by gender
Gender	1st place, gold medalist(s)	2nd place, silver medalist(s)	3rd place, bronze medalist(s)	Total
Male	0	0	3	3
Female	2	0	3	5
Total	2	0	6	8

== Athletics ==
Key

- Note–Ranks given for track events are within the athlete's heat only
- Q = Qualified for the next round
- q = Qualified for the next round as a fastest loser or, in field events, by position without achieving the qualifying target
- NR = National record
- N/A = Round not applicable for the event
- Bye = Athlete not required to compete in round

Men
Track & road events

Athlete	Event	Qualification		Final	
Athlete	Event	Result	Rank	Result	Rank
Hajrudin Vejzović	100 m	10.60	7	Did not advance	
Edhem Vikalo	100 m	10.64	8	Did not advance	
Abedin Mujezinović	800 m	1:47.23	7	Did not advance	
Stefan Cukovic	1,500 m			3:50.33	11
Rusmir Malkočević	400 m hurdles	53.27	6	Did not advance	

Field events

Athlete	Event	Qualification		Final	
Athlete	Event	Result	Rank	Result	Rank
Mesud Pezer	Shot put			20.23	4
Dejan Mileusnić	Javelin throw			75.70	4

== Boules ==
Men

Athlete	Event	Ranking round		Quarterfinal	Semifinal	Final / BM	
Athlete	Event	Score	Seed	Opposition Score	Opposition Score	Opposition Score	Rank
Andrija Ćorluka	Lyonnaise - Precision shooting	38	4 Q	Boufateh (ALG); L 6-15	Did not advance		5
Andrija Ćorluka	Lyonnaise - Progressive shooting	77	7 Q	Zdauc (SLO); L 39-39	Did not advance		5

== Boxing ==
Men

Athlete	Event	Round of 16	Quarterfinal	Semifinal	Final	Rank
Haris Aganović	52 kg	Boukedim (FRA); L RSC	Did not advance			9
Alen Rahimić	57 kg	Bye	Mordjane (ALG); L 0-3	Did not advance		5
Nikola Ivković	60 kg	Bye	Canonico (ITA); L RSC	Did not advance		5
Luka Veljović	63 kg	Özmen (TUR); L 0-3	Did not advance			9
Gianni Dedić	69 kg	Bye	El Barbari (MAR); L 0-3	Did not advance		5
Leo Cvitanović	75 kg	Güler (TUR); W 3-0	Nemouchi (ALG); L 0-3	Did not advance		5
Ahmed Dananovic	81 kg	Bye	Jalidov (ESP); L RSC	Did not advance		5
Džemal Bošnjak	91 kg	Bye	Bouafia (FRA); L 0-2	Did not advance		5

Women

Athlete	Event	Round of 16	Quarterfinal	Semifinal	Final	Rank
Tara Bohatjuk	63 kg		Larché (FRA); L 0-3	Did not advance		5

== Cycling ==
Men

Athlete	Event	Time	Rank
Vedad Karic	Men's road race	3:15:35	28

== Gymnastics ==
=== Artistic ===
Men

Athlete	Event	Qualification								Final							
Athlete	Event	Apparatus						Total	Rank	Apparatus						Total	Rank
Athlete	Event	F	PH	R	V	PB	HB	Total	Rank	F	PH	R	V	PB	HB	Total	Rank
Sergej Malic-Corni	Vault	—N/a			11.900	—N/a		11.900	40	Did not advance							

== Judo ==
Men

Athlete	Event	Round of 16	Quarterfinals	Semifinals	Repechage	Final / BM	
Athlete	Event	Opposition Result	Opposition Result	Opposition Result	Opposition Result	Opposition Result	Rank
Božidar Vučurević	Men's −81 kg	Šerifovski (MKD); W 10-00	Albayrak (TUR); L 00-01	Did not advance	Hajji (TUN); W 10-00	Urquiza (ESP); L 00-01	5
Toni Miletić	Men's −90 kg	Ben Ammar (TUN); W 10-00	Benamadi (ALG); W 10-00	Tselidis (GRE); L 00-01	Bye	Brašnjović (SRB); W 10-00	3rd place, bronze medalist(s)
Vasilije Vujicic	Men's +100 kg	Chelaru (ESP); L 00-01	Did not advance				9

Women

Athlete	Event	Round of 16	Quarterfinals	Semifinals	Repechage	Final / BM	
Athlete	Event	Opposition Result	Opposition Result	Opposition Result	Opposition Result	Opposition Result	Rank
Anđela Samardžić	Women's −57 kg	Bye	Bozkurt (TUR); L 00-10	Did not advance	Vellozzi (FRA); W 01-00	Halata (ALG); W 01-00	3rd place, bronze medalist(s)
Aleksandra Samardžić	Women's −70 kg	Bellakehal (ALG); W 10-00	Tsunoda (ESP); L 00-01	Did not advance	Esposito (ITA); L 00-10	Did not advance	7
Larisa Cerić	Women's +78 kg	Bye	Hayme (FRA); L 00-01	Did not advance	Tavano (ITA); W 10-00	Maranić (CRO); W 01-00	3rd place, bronze medalist(s)

== Karate ==
Men

Athlete	Event	Round of 16	Quarterfinals	Semifinals	Repechage	Final / BM	
Athlete	Event	Opposition Result	Opposition Result	Opposition Result	Opposition Result	Opposition Result	Rank
Pavle Dujaković	−60 kg	Bye	Şamdan (TUR); L 0–8	Did not advance	Rfigui (TUN); W 2–1	Aboukora (EGY); L 4–8	5
Hamza Turulja	−75 kg	Bye	Zaid (ALG); L 0–3	Did not advance	Loizides (CYP); W 0–0	Eltemur (TUR); W 3–1	3rd place, bronze medalist(s)
Meris Muhović	−84 kg	Malović (MNE); L 0–2	Did not advance				11
Rijad Džuho	+84 kg	Mahmoud (EGY); W 3–2	Confiac (FRA); W 4–1	Kvesić (CRO); L 1–5	Bye	Choiya (TUN); W 2–1	3rd place, bronze medalist(s)

Women

Athlete	Event	Round of 16	Quarterfinals	Semifinals	Repechage	Final / BM	
Athlete	Event	Opposition Result	Opposition Result	Opposition Result	Opposition Result	Opposition Result	Rank
Iris Ćorić	−50 kg	El Hayti (MAR); L 1–2	Did not advance				10
Paola Kostić	−55 kg	Charif (FRA); L 2–5	Did not advance				11
Nejra Sipović	−61 kg	Mahjoub (TUN); L 0–1	Did not advance		Živković (SRB); W 4–0	Dario (FRA); W 2–1	3rd place, bronze medalist(s)
Ivona Ćavar	−68 kg	Panetsidou (GRE); L 0–0	Did not advance				9
Stefani Krešić	+68 kg	Crivelli (ITA); L 0–0	Did not advance				9

== Shooting ==
Men

Athlete	Event	Qualification		Final	
Athlete	Event	Points	Rank	Points	Rank
Nikola Jovičić	10 m air pistol	572.0	8 Q	145.8	7
Nedžad Džanković	10 m air rifle	621.0	13	Did not advance	
Matej Rašić	10 m air rifle	616.8	17	Did not advance	
Mladen Šimić	Trap	103	27	Did not advance	
Miladin Stjepanović	Trap	100	28	Did not advance	

Women

Athlete	Event	Qualification		Final	
Athlete	Event	Points	Rank	Points	Rank
Segmedina Bjelošević	10 m air rifle	618.4	16	Did not advance	
Farah Onescuk	10 m air rifle	611.2	19	Did not advance	

Mixed

Athlete	Event	Qualification		Final	
Athlete	Event	Points	Rank	Points	Rank
Segmedina Bjelošević; Nedžad Džanković	10 m air rifle	618.3	13	Did not advance	
Farah Onescuk; Matej Rašić	10 m air rifle	616.1	15	Did not advance	

== Swimming ==
Women

Athlete	Event	Heat		Final	
Athlete	Event	Time	Rank	Time	Rank
Lana Pudar	50 m butterfly	26.78	5 Q	26.77	5
Lana Pudar	100 m butterfly	59.81	2 Q	57.55	1st place, gold medalist(s)
Lana Pudar	200 m butterfly	2:12.83	1 Q	2:09.18	1st place, gold medalist(s)

== Taekwondo ==
Men

Athlete	Event	Round of 32	Round of 16	Quarterfinals	Semifinals	Final / BM	
Athlete	Event	Opposition Result	Opposition Result	Opposition Result	Opposition Result	Opposition Result	Rank
Nedžad Husić	Men's −80 kg	—N/a	Bajra (KOS); W 28–3	Katoussi (TUN); L 4–22	Did not advance		5
Dinko Šegedin	Men's +80 kg	—N/a	Bendaikha (ALG); W 18–6	Šapina (CRO); L 3–24	Did not advance		5

Women

Athlete	Event	Round of 16	Quarterfinals	Semifinals	Final / BM	
Athlete	Event	Opposition Result	Opposition Result	Opposition Result	Opposition Result	Rank
Džejla Makaš	Women's −49 kg	Dhahri (TUN); L 2–16	Did not advance			9
Zorana Sandić	Women's −67 kg	Georgievska (MKD); L 5–13	Did not advance			9

== Weightlifting ==
Men

Athlete	Event	Snatch					Clean & jerk				
Athlete	Event	1	2	3	Result	Rank	1	2	3	Result	Rank
Faris Durak	−61 kg	~~86~~	~~86~~	~~86~~	—	DNF	102	~~107~~	—	102	7
Dino Smajić	−102 kg	120	130	140	140	10	150	160	165	165	9
