= Syria at the 2005 Mediterranean Games =

- IOC code: SYR
- NOC: Syrian Olympic Committee

in Almería
- Medals Ranked 13th: Gold 1 Silver 5 Bronze 5 Total 11

Mediterranean Games appearances (overview)
- 1951; 1955; 1959; 1963; 1967; 1971; 1975; 1979; 1983; 1987; 1991; 1993; 1997; 2001; 2005; 2009; 2013; 2018; 2022

Other related appearances
- United Arab Republic (1959)

Syria (SYR) competed at the 2005 Mediterranean Games in Almería, Spain. The nation had a total number of 30 participants (28 men and 2 women).

== Medals ==
=== Gold ===
Boxing

- Men's Featherweight (– 57 kg): Yaser Shigan

=== Silver ===
Boxing

- Men's Light Flyweight (– 48 kg): Amjad Aouda
- Men's Bantamweight (– 54 kg): Mohamed Amiriek

Weightlifting

- Men's 105 kg (Clean&Jerk): Ahed Joughili

Wrestling

- Men's Freestyle (– 55 kg): Firas Rifaei
- Men's Freestyle (– 66 kg): Mazen Kadmani

=== Bronze ===
Athletics

- Men's Javelin Throw: Feras Al-Mahamid

Weightlifting

- Men's 105 kg (Snatch): Ahed Joughili

Wrestling

- Men's Greco-Roman (– 60 kg): Zakaria Nashed
- Men's Greco-Roman (– 66 kg): Yaser Salih
- Men's Freestyle (– 120 kg): Akil Kahli

== See also ==
- Syria at the 2004 Summer Olympics
- Syria at the 2008 Summer Olympics
