= Judo at the 2022 Mediterranean Games – Men's 90 kg =

Judo competitions

Judo Men's 90 kg at the 2022 Mediterranean Games
- Venue: Mohammed Ben Ahmed Convention Centre – Hall 03 and 06
- Location: Oran, Algeria
- Date: 1 July
- Competitors: 14 from 14 nations

Medalists
| gold medal | Mihael Žgank | Turkey |
| silver medal | Theodoros Tselidis | Greece |
| bronze medal | Toni Miletić | Bosnia and Herzegovina |
| bronze medal | Tristani Mosakhlishvili | Spain |

The men's 90 kg competition in judo at the 2022 Mediterranean Games was held on 1 July at the Mohammed Ben Ahmed Convention Centre in Oran.

== Results ==
=== Main bracket ===
Round of 16
Caramnob Sagaipov (LBN) | 00
Andrej Chakarovski (MKD) | 10
Darko Brašnjović (SRB) | 00
Tristani Mosakhlishvili (ESP) | 10
Francis Damier (FRA) | 10
Nicolas Grinda (MON) | 00
Abdelaziz Ben Ammar (TUN) | 00
Toni Miletić (BIH) | 10
Gennaro Pirelli (ITA) | 10
Erson Ramaj (ALB) | 00
Theodoros Tselidis (GRE) | 10
Narsej Lackovič (SLO) | 00

Quarterfinals
Mihael Žgank (TUR) | 10
Andrej Chakarovski (MKD) | 00
Tristani Mosakhlishvili (ESP) | 10
Francis Damier (FRA) | 00
Abderrahmane Benamadi (ALG) | 00
Toni Miletić (BIH) | 10
Gennaro Pirelli (ITA) | 00
Theodoros Tselidis (GRE) | 01

Semifinals
Mihael Žgank (TUR) | 10
Tristani Mosakhlishvili (ESP) | 00
Toni Miletić (BIH) | 00
Theodoros Tselidis (GRE) | 01

Final
Mihael Žgank (TUR) | 10
Theodoros Tselidis (GRE) | 00

=== Repechage ===
Repechage 1
Darko Brašnjović (SRB) | 10
Francis Damier (FRA) | 00

Repechage 2
Andrej Chakarovski (MKD) | 00
Darko Brašnjović (SRB) | 10

Bronze medal
Darko Brašnjović (SRB) | 00
Toni Miletić (BIH) | 10

Repechage 1
Abdelaziz Ben Ammar (TUN) | 00
Abderrahmane Benamadi (ALG) | 10
Narsej Lackovič (SLO) | 00
Gennaro Pirelli (ITA) | 10

Repechage 2
Abderrahmane Benamadi (ALG) | 00
Gennaro Pirelli (ITA) | 10

Bronze medal
Gennaro Pirelli (ITA) | 00
Tristani Mosakhlishvili (ESP) | 10
