= Syria at the Mediterranean Games =

- IOC code: SYR
- NOC: Syrian Olympic Committee
- Medals Ranked 14th: Gold 32 Silver 42 Bronze 80 Total 154

Mediterranean Games appearances (overview)
- 1951; 1955; 1959; 1963; 1967; 1971; 1975; 1979; 1983; 1987; 1991; 1993; 1997; 2001; 2005; 2009; 2013; 2018; 2022; 2026

Other related appearances
- United Arab Republic (1959)

Syria has competed at every celebration of the Mediterranean Games since the 1951 Mediterranean Games. As of 2026, the Syrian athletes have won a total of 154 medals. The country's ranking in the history of the Games is 14th place.

== Medal tables ==
=== Medals by Mediterranean Games ===
Host nation

Below lies the table representing all Syrian medals across all games. Syria has won a total of 154 medals.

Games	Athletes	Gold	Silver	Bronze	Total	Rank
1951 Alexandria	65	0	3	10	13	9
1955 Barcelona	41	0	0	1	1	8
1959 Beirut	as part of United Arab Republic (RAU)					
1963 Naples	72	0	1	3	4	7
1971 İzmir	108	0	2	6	8	9
1975 Algiers	177	3	2	11	16	9
1979 Split	11	1	0	0	1	11
1983 Casablanca	49	0	3	2	5	12
1987 Latakia	277	9	6	12	27	6
1991 Athens	29	4	2	5	11	10
1993 Languedoc-Roussillon	35	4	2	5	11	11
1997 Bari	27	2	1	2	5	13
2001 Tunis	76	0	5	4	9	14
2005 Almería	30	1	5	5	11	13
2009 Pescara	60	2	3	7	12	15
2013 Mersin	14	0	2	0	2	18
2018 Tarragona	33	2	2	3	7	16
2022 Oran	26	4	3	0	7	14
2026 Taranto	31	0	0	4	4	24
Total		32	42	80	154	14th

=== Medals by sport ===
Update to 2026 Mediterranean Games

Sport	Gold	Silver	Bronze	Total
Boxing	9	10	20	39
Wrestling	8	18	34	60
Weightlifting	6	10	16	32
Athletics	3	2	2	7
Equestrian	3	1	0	4
Football	1	0	1	2
Gymnastics	1	0	0	1
Swimming	1	0	0	1
Judo	0	1	2	3
Karate	0	0	2	2
Shooting	0	0	2	2
Basketball	0	0	1	1
Totals (12 entries)	32	42	80	154

==== Medals by the Mediterranean Beach Games ====
Update to 2023 Mediterranean Beach Games

Syria won so far four medals at the Mediterranean Beach Games in which being two gold, one silver and two bronze, since their debut.

Sport	Gold	Silver	Bronze	Total
Aquathlon	0	0	1	1
Beach wrestling	2	1	1	4
Total	2	1	2	5

== See also ==
- Syria at the Olympics
- Syria at the Paralympics
- Syria at the Asian Games
- Sports in Syria
