= Equestrian at the 2022 Mediterranean Games =

- Venue: Antar Ibn Chaddad Equestrian Center
- Dates: 1 – 3 July

The equestrian events at the 2022 Mediterranean Games was held on 1 and 3 July 2022 at the Antar Ibn Chaddad Equestrian Center in Es Sénia.

== Medal summary ==
Event	Gold	Silver	Bronze
Individual jumping	Ahmad Hamcho on Caldero; Syria	Chadi Gharib on Cabernet De Mars; Syria	Mohamed Talaat on Darshan; Egypt
Team jumping	Syria; Laith Ali on Camélia de la Vigne; Chadi Gharib on Cabernet de Mars; Ahmad Hamcho on Caldero; Amre Hamcho on Caramia 25	Egypt; Mohamed El-Naggar on Comme Il Faut; Mohamed Talaat on Darshan; Mohamed Weaam on Morocco; Mouda Zeyada on Katia	Turkey; Ahmet Berk Başeğmez on Corthagos 58; İhsan Sencer Horasan on Casscord; Özgür Özkan on Champ's Son; Hasan Şentürk on Cantaire O

== Medal table ==
Rank	Nation	Gold	Silver	Bronze	Total
1	Syria	2	1	0	3
2	Egypt	0	1	1	2
3	Turkey	0	0	1	1
Totals (3 entries)		2	2	2	6
