= Swimming at the 2022 Mediterranean Games – Women's 100 metre butterfly =

Women's 100 metre butterfly at the 2022 Mediterranean Games
- Location: Bir El Djir, Algeria
- Dates: 4 July
- Competitors: 13 from 8 nations
- Winning time: 57.55

Medalists
gold medal	Lana Pudar	Bosnia and Herzegovina
silver medal	Anna Ntountounaki	Greece
bronze medal	Ilaria Bianchi	Italy

The women's 100 metre butterfly competition at the 2022 Mediterranean Games was held on 4 July 2022 at the Aquatic Center of the Olympic Complex in Bir El Djir.

== Records ==
Prior to this competition, the existing world and Mediterranean Games records were as follows:

World record	Sarah Sjöström (SWE)	55.48	Rio de Janeiro, Brazil	7 August 2016
Mediterranean Games record	Elena Di Liddo (ITA)	57.59	Tarragona, Spain	23 June 2018

The following records were established during the competition:

Date	Event	Name	Nationality	Time	Record
4 July	Final	Lana Pudar	Bosnia and Herzegovina	57.55	GR

== Results ==
=== Heats ===
The heats were started at 10:20.

Rank	Heat	Lane	Name	Nationality	Time	Notes
1	1	4	Ilaria Bianchi	Italy	59.55	Q
2	2	1	Lana Pudar	Bosnia and Herzegovina	59.81	Q
3	1	5	Claudia Tarzia	Italy	1:00.05	Q
4	2	3	Mariana Cunha	Portugal	1:00.47	Q
5	1	3	Ana Monteiro	Portugal	1:00.59	Q
6	2	4	Anna Ntountounaki	Greece	1:00.62	Q
7	2	5	Georgia Damasioti	Greece	1:00.79	Q
8	1	6	Carla Hurtado	Spain	1:01.53	Q
9	2	6	Emma Morel	France	1:02.37	
10	1	2	Juliette Marchand	France	1:02.43	
11	2	7	Júlia Pujadas	Spain	1:03.45	
12	2	2	Defne Taçyıldız	Turkey	1:03.99	
13	1	7	Lilia Sihem Midouni	Algeria	1:05.53	

=== Final ===
The final was held at 18:16.

Rank	Lane	Name	Nationality	Time	Notes
1st place, gold medalist(s)	5	Lana Pudar	Bosnia and Herzegovina	57.55	GR
2nd place, silver medalist(s)	7	Anna Ntountounaki	Greece	58.56	
3rd place, bronze medalist(s)	4	Ilaria Bianchi	Italy	59.06	
4	6	Mariana Cunha	Portugal	59.36	
5	1	Georgia Damasioti	Greece	59.40	
6	3	Claudia Tarzia	Italy	59.41	
7	2	Ana Monteiro	Portugal	1:00.13	
8	8	Carla Hurtado	Spain	1:01.03	
