= Judo at the 2022 Mediterranean Games – Women's +78 kg =

Judo competitions

Judo Women's +78 kg at the 2022 Mediterranean Games
- Venue: Mohammed Ben Ahmed Convention Centre – Hall 03 and 06
- Location: Oran, Algeria
- Date: 1 July
- Competitors: 10 from 10 nations

Medalists
gold medal	Kayra Sayit	Turkey
silver medal	Nihel Cheikh Rouhou	Tunisia
bronze medal	Larisa Cerić	Bosnia and Herzegovina
bronze medal	Coralie Hayme	France

The women's +78 kg competition in judo at the 2022 Mediterranean Games was held on 1 July at the Mohammed Ben Ahmed Convention Centre in Oran.

== Results ==
=== Main bracket ===
Round of 16
Asya Tavano (ITA)	10
Nisrin Bousbaa (ESP)	00
Milica Žabić (SRB)	10
Urška Torkar (SLO)	00

Quarterfinals
Nihel Cheikh Rouhou (TUN)	10
Asya Tavano (ITA)	00
Coralie Hayme (FRA)	01
Larisa Cerić (BIH)	00
Kayra Sayit (TUR)	10
Milica Žabić (SRB)	00
Sonia Asselah (ALG)	00
Ivana Maranić (CRO)	10

Semifinals
Nihel Cheikh Rouhou (TUN)	01
Coralie Hayme (FRA)	00
Kayra Sayit (TUR)	11
Ivana Maranić (CRO)	00

Final
Nihel Cheikh Rouhou (TUN)	00
Kayra Sayit (TUR)	01

=== Repechage ===
Repechage
Asya Tavano (ITA)	00
Larisa Cerić (BIH)	10
Milica Žabić (SRB)	10
Sonia Asselah (ALG)	00

Bronze medal
Larisa Cerić (BIH)	01
Ivana Maranić (CRO)	00
Milica Žabić (SRB)	00
Coralie Hayme (FRA)	10
