= Silvana Mirvić =

Yugoslav and Bosnian basketball player

Personal information
- Born: 4 March 1971 (age 55) Višegrad, SR Bosnia-Herzegovina, SFR Yugoslavia
- Listed height: 1.80 m (5 ft 11 in)
- Listed weight: 70 kg (154 lb)
- Position: Forward

Career history
- ŽKK Čelik Zenica
Medals
Women's basketball
Representing Yugoslavia
EuroBasket
Silver medal – second place	1991 Tel Aviv
Representing Bosnia and Herzegovina
Mediterranean Games
Gold medal – first place	1993 France

Silvana Mirvić (born 4 March 1971) is a former Bosnian and Yugoslav professional basketball player who participated at the EuroBasket 1991 for Yugoslavia, and then for Bosnia and Herzegovina at the 1993 Mediterranean Games, and two EuroBasket competitions in 1997 and 1999. She played for Čelik Zenica in the Adriatic League season 2010 - 2011.
