= Karate at the 2005 Mediterranean Games =

Karate competition

The Karate competition at the 2005 Mediterranean Games was held in the Rafael Florido Sports Hall in Almería, Spain.

== Medallists ==
=== Men's competition ===
Event	Gold	Silver	Bronze
60 kg	(Tunisia) Montassar Tabben	(Spain) Davíd Luque	(Turkey) Şevket Baştürk (France) Davy Dona
65 kg	(Italy) Ciro Massa	(Spain) Antonio Sánchez	(France) Mehdi Alloune (Tunisia) Hassib Kanoun
70 kg	(Egypt) Mohamed El Shemy	(Spain) Óscar Vázquez	(Italy) Giuseppe Di Domenico (Algeria) Koceila Hamadini
75 kg	(France) Olivier Beaudry	(Bosnia and Herzegovina) Adnan Hadžić	(Greece) Konstantinos Papadopoulos (Algeria) Yacine Gouri
80 kg	(Spain) Iván Leal	(Serbia and Montenegro) Miloš Živković	(Tunisia) Mohamed Hammouda (Turkey) Zeynel Çelik
+80 kg	(Italy) Stefano Maniscalco	(Serbia and Montenegro) Almir Cecunjanin	(Spain) Francisco Martínez (Greece) Spyridon Margaritopoulos
Open	(Italy) Stefano Maniscalco	(France) Yann Baillon	(Egypt) Mohamed El Hamid (Turkey) Yusuf Başer

=== Women's competition ===
Event	Gold	Silver	Bronze
50 kg	(Egypt) Heba Aly	(Spain) Natalia García	(Turkey) Vildan Doğan (France) Vanessa Ruiz
55 kg	(Italy) Selene Guglielmi	(Algeria) Ilhem Eldjon	(Spain) Estefania García (Slovenia) Teja Šavor
60 kg	(Serbia and Montenegro) Snežana Pantić	(Croatia) Petra Narandja	(Spain) Noelia Fernández (Tunisia) Rafika Dakhlaoui
65 kg	(Bosnia and Herzegovina) Arnela Odžaković	(Spain) Gloria Rodríguez	(Greece) Alexia Karypidou (Turkey) Gülcihan Ustaoğlu
+65 kg	(Spain) Cristina Feo	(Turkey) Yıldız Aras	(France) Emmeline Mottet (Italy) Greta Vitelli
Open	(Turkey) Yıldız Aras	(Spain) Gloria Rodríguez	(Tunisia) Rafika Dakhlaoui (Bosnia and Herzegovina) Merima Softić

== Medal table ==
* Host nation (Spain)

Rank	Nation	Gold	Silver	Bronze	Total
1	Italy	4	0	2	6
2	Spain*	2	6	3	11
3	Egypt	2	0	1	3
4	Serbia and Montenegro	1	2	0	3
5	Turkey	1	1	5	7
6	France	1	1	4	6
7	Bosnia and Herzegovina	1	1	1	3
8	Tunisia	1	0	4	5
9	Algeria	0	1	2	3
10	Croatia	0	1	0	1
11	Greece	0	0	3	3
12	Slovenia	0	0	1	1
Totals (12 entries)		13	13	26	52
