= Syria at the 2022 Mediterranean Games =

- IOC code: SYR
- NOC: Syrian Olympic Committee

in Oran, Algeria
- Competitors: 26 in 7 sports
- Flag bearer: Man Asaad
- Medals Ranked 14th: Gold 4 Silver 3 Bronze 0 Total 7

Mediterranean Games appearances (overview)
- 1951; 1955; 1959; 1963; 1967; 1971; 1975; 1979; 1983; 1987; 1991; 1993; 1997; 2001; 2005; 2009; 2013; 2018; 2022

Other related appearances
- United Arab Republic (1959)

Syria competed at the 2022 Mediterranean Games in Oran, Algeria from 25 June to 6 July 2022.

== Competitors ==
The following is the list of number of competitors participating at the Games per sport/discipline.

Sport	Men	Women	Total
Athletics	1	0	1
Boxing	6	0	6
Equestrian	4	0	4
Gymnastics	3	0	3
Judo	2	0	2
Weightlifting	1	0	1
Wrestling	6	0	6
Total	26	0	26

== Medal table ==
Medal	Name	Sport	Event	Date
Gold	Ahmed Ghousoon	Boxing	Men's middleweight	1 July
Gold	Amre Hamcho; Ahmad Hamcho; Laith Ali; Chadi Gharib	Equestrian	Team jumping	1 July
Gold	Ahmad Hamcho	Equestrian	Individual jumping	3 July
Gold	Man Asaad	Weightlifting	Men's +102 kg Clean & Jerk	4 July
Silver	Majd Eddin Ghazal	Athletics	Men's High Jump	1 July
Silver	Chadi Gharib	Equestrian	Individual jumping	3 July
Silver	Man Asaad	Weightlifting	Men's +102 kg Snatch	4 July

Medals by date
Day	Date	1st place, gold medalist(s)	2nd place, silver medalist(s)	3rd place, bronze medalist(s)	Total
6	1 July	2	1	0	3
8	3 July	1	1	0	2
9	4 July	1	1	0	2
Total		4	3	0	7

Medals by sport
Sport	1st place, gold medalist(s)	2nd place, silver medalist(s)	3rd place, bronze medalist(s)	Total
Athletics	0	1	0	1
Boxing	1	0	0	1
Equestrian	2	1	0	3
Weightlifting	1	1	0	3
Total	4	3	0	7

Medals by gender
Gender	1st place, gold medalist(s)	2nd place, silver medalist(s)	3rd place, bronze medalist(s)	Total
Male	4	3	0	3
Female	0	0	0	0
Total	4	3	0	7

== Athletics ==
Key

- Note–Ranks given for track events are within the athlete's heat only
- Q = Qualified for the next round
- q = Qualified for the next round as a fastest loser or, in field events, by position without achieving the qualifying target
- NR = National record
- N/A = Round not applicable for the event
- Bye = Athlete not required to compete in round

Field events
Men

Athlete	Event	Qualification		Final	
Athlete	Event	Distance	Position	Distance	Position
Majd Eddin Ghazal	High jump	—N/a		2.22 m	2nd place, silver medalist(s)

== Boxing ==
Syria nominated six boxers for the competition.

Men

Athlete	Event	Round of 16	Quarterfinals	Semifinals	Final	
Athlete	Event	Opposition Result	Opposition Result	Opposition Result	Opposition Result	Rank
Belal Joukhdar	Featherweight	Murati (KOS); W 2–1	Mhamdi (TUN); L 0–3	did not advance		5
Abdulhadi Nakkash	Welterweight	Ali (LBA); L RSC	did not advance			9
Ahmed Ghousoon	Middleweight	—N/a	Memić (SRB); W 2–1	Fendero (FRA); W 3–0	Nemouchi (ALG); W 2–1	1st place, gold medalist(s)
Abd Al Hameed Youssef	Light heavyweight	Aykutsun (TUR); L RSC-I	did not advance			9
Alaa Eldin Ghousoon	Heavyweight	—N/a	Hamani (ALG); L 1-2	did not advance		5
Mohammad Mlaiyes	Super heavyweight	—N/a	Aboudou (FRA); L 0-3	did not advance		5

== Equestrian ==
Syria competed in equestrian.

=== Jumping ===
Athlete	Horse	Event	Qualification								Final					Total	
Athlete	Horse	Event	Round 1		Round 2			Round 3			Round A		Round B			Total	
Athlete	Horse	Event	Penalties	Rank	Penalties	Total	Rank	Penalties	Total	Rank	Penalties	Rank	Penalties	Total	Rank	Penalties	Rank
Amre Hamcho	Caramia 25	Individual	—N/a								8	5 Q	4	4	5	12	5
Ahmad Hamcho	Caldero	Individual	—N/a								4	=1 Q	4	4	1	4	1st place, gold medalist(s)
Laith Ali	Camelia de la Vigne	Individual	—N/a								#	29^{TO}	did not advance				
Chadi Gharib	Cabernet de Mars	Individual	—N/a								4	=1 Q	4	4	2	4	2nd place, silver medalist(s)
Amre Hamcho; Ahmad Hamcho; Laith Ali; Chadi Gharib	See above	Team	1	1 Q	—N/a											4	1st place, gold medalist(s)

== Gymnastics ==
Syria nominated 2 gymnasts in all-around and individual apparatus.

=== Artistic ===
Men

Athlete	Event	Qualification								Final							
Athlete	Event	Apparatus						Total	Rank	Apparatus						Total	Rank
Athlete	Event	F	PH	R	V	PB	HB	Total	Rank	F	PH	R	V	PB	HB	Total	Rank
Lais Najjar	All-around	12.950	13.650	12.500	13.850	10.100	12.600	75.650	19 Q	13.450	11.700	12.000	14.050	13.700	6.550	71.450	19
Yazan Al Souliman	All-around	11.850	10.650	11.000	11.950	11.900	10.000	67.350	29 Q	12.350	11.900	11.250	10.900	12.450	10.450	69.300	20

Athlete	Event	Qualification								Final							
Athlete	Event	Apparatus						Total	Rank	Apparatus						Total	Rank
Athlete	Event	F	PH	R	V	PB	HB	Total	Rank	F	PH	R	V	PB	HB	Total	Rank
Lais Najjar	Vault	—N/a			13.850	—N/a		13.850	7 Q	—N/a			13.775	—N/a		13.775	5

== Judo ==
Syria nominated 2 judokas for the competition.

Men

Athlete	Event	Round of 16	Quarterfinals	Semifinals	Repechage 1	Repechage 2	Final / BM	
Athlete	Event	Opposition Result	Opposition Result	Opposition Result	Opposition Result	Opposition Result	Opposition Result	Rank
Suleiman Al-Refai	60 kg	Štarkel (SLO); W WAZ (1S1 - 0S2)	Samy (EGY); L IPP (0 - 10)	—N/a	Merlin (FRA); L IPP (0S1 - 10S1)	did not advance		7
Hasan Bayan	73 kg	Demirel (TUR); W WAZ (1S1 - 0S2)	Dris (ALG); L PEN (OH - 10S2)	—N/a	Çullhaj (ALB); W IPP (10S2 - 0)	Tsoutlasvili (GRE); L IPP (0 - 10S2)	did not advance	7

== Weightlifting ==
Syria has nominated one weightlifter, an Olympic medalist Man Asaad.

=== Men ===
Athlete	Event	Snatch		Clean & Jerk	
Athlete	Event	Result	Rank	Result	Rank
Man Asaad	+102 kg	197	2nd place, silver medalist(s)	247	1st place, gold medalist(s)

== Wrestling ==
Syria nominated 6 wrestlers in the Greco-Roman and Freestyle.

Key:

- VT (ranking points: 5–0 or 0–5) – Victory by fall.
- VB (ranking points: 5–0 or 0–5) – Victory by injury (VF for forfeit, VA for withdrawal or disqualification)
- PP (ranking points: 3–1 or 1–3) – Decision by points – the loser with technical points.
- PO (ranking points: 3–0 or 0–3) – Decision by points – the loser without technical points.
- ST (ranking points: 4–0 or 0–4) – Great superiority – the loser without technical points and a margin of victory of at least 8 (Greco-Roman) or 10 (freestyle) points.
- SP (ranking points: 4–1 or 1–4) – Technical superiority – the loser with technical points and a margin of victory of at least 8 (Greco-Roman) or 10 (freestyle) points.

Men's Freestyle

Athlete	Event	Round of 16	Quarterfinal	Semifinal	Final / BM	
Athlete	Event	Opposition Result	Opposition Result	Opposition Result	Opposition Result	Rank
Ahmad Dirki	−65 kg	Realbuto (ITA); W 7-4	Kherbache (ALG); L 5-6	did not advance		
Mahd Feda Aldin Alasta	−86 kg	Badawi (EGY); L 0-6	did not advance			
Omar Sarem	−125 kg	Kaouslidis (CYP); L 0-4	did not advance			

Men's Greco-Roman

Athlete	Event	Round of 16	Quarterfinal	Semifinal	Repechage	Final / BM	
Athlete	Event	Opposition Result	Opposition Result	Opposition Result	Opposition Result	Opposition Result	Rank
Ahmad Alnakdali	−60 kg	—N/a	Sina (ALB); W 9-0	Tudezca (FRA); L 7-12 VT	—N/a	Marvice (ITA); L 8 VA -10	5
Mohamad Fawaz	−67 kg	—N/a	Sanfilippo (ITA); L 0-8	did not advance			
Mohamad Alobeid	−77 kg	—N/a	Kamenjašević (CRO); L 0-9	did not advance			
