= Karate at the 2001 Mediterranean Games =

In the karate events at the 2001 Mediterranean Games in Tunis, the Open men's competition was won by Konstantinos Papadopoulos of Greece, and the Open women's competition by Yıldız Aras of Turkey. France came top of the medals table, with 5 gold medals.

== Medallists ==
=== Men's competition ===
| Event | Gold | Silver | Bronze |
|---|---|---|---|
| 60 kg | (France) Abdellatif Dini | (Italy) Francesco Luca Ortu | (Tunisia) Belhassen Gharbi (Morocco) Driss Elmannani |
| 65 kg | (France) Alexandre Biamonti | (Italy) Andrea Calzola | (Tunisia) Sabeur Kriou (Egypt) Ashraf Fenoun |
| 70 kg | (France) Rida Bel-Lhasen | (Spain) Óscar Vázquez Martins | (Egypt) Mohamed Elshemy (Italy) Corrado Ferrara |
| 75 kg | (Tunisia) Wissem Arfaoui | (Egypt) Ahmed Elsayed | (Bosnia and Herzegovina) Adnan Hadžić (Greece) Stefanos Tetelenis |
| 80 kg | (Tunisia) Mohamed Monaam Hammouda | (Italy) Salvatore Loria | (Algeria) Tarek Admane (France) Yann Baillon |
| + 80 kg | (France) Seydina Balde | (Tunisia) Hanabaal Jegham | (Italy) Davide Benetello (Bosnia and Herzegovina) Arnel Kalušić |
| Open | (Greece) Konstantinos Papadopoulos | (Socialist Federal Republic of Yugoslavia) Predrag Stojadinov | (Turkey) Okay Arpa (France) David Felix |

=== Women's competition ===
| Event | Gold | Silver | Bronze |
|---|---|---|---|
| 50 kg | (Tunisia) Hela Boudi | (Italy) Michela Nanni | (Slovenia) Mateja Bukovnik (Egypt) Heba Aly |
| 55 kg | (Spain) Estefania Garcia Romo | (Italy) Roberta Sodero | (Tunisia) Faten Heni (Croatia) Lana Sanja Susović |
| 60 kg | (France) Nathalie Leroy | (Egypt) Doaa Abdel Aziz | (Spain) Noelia Fernandez (Socialist Federal Republic of Yugoslavia) Snežana Perić |
| 65 kg | (Spain) Gloria Casanova Rodriguez | (France) Patricia Chereau | (Socialist Federal Republic of Yugoslavia) Sara Peković (Italy) Roberta Minet |
| + 65 kg | (Greece) Theodora Dougeni | (France) Laurence Fischer | (Socialist Federal Republic of Yugoslavia) Vanja Vrhovac (Algeria) Rym Draoui |
| Open | (Turkey) Yıldız Aras | (Greece) Theodora Dougeni | (Socialist Federal Republic of Yugoslavia) Slađana Mitić (France) Nathalie Leroy |

== Medal table ==
| Rank | Nation | Gold | Silver | Bronze | Total |
|---|---|---|---|---|---|
| 1 | France (FRA) | 5 | 2 | 3 | 10 |
| 2 | Tunisia (TUN) | 3 | 1 | 3 | 7 |
| 3 | Greece (GRE) | 2 | 1 | 1 | 4 |
| 3 | Spain (ESP) | 2 | 1 | 1 | 4 |
| 5 | Turkey (TUR) | 1 | 0 | 1 | 2 |
| 6 | Italy (ITA) | 0 | 5 | 3 | 8 |
| 7 | Egypt (EGY) | 0 | 2 | 3 | 5 |
| 8 | Yugoslavia (YUG) | 0 | 1 | 4 | 5 |
| 9 | Algeria (ALG) | 0 | 0 | 2 | 2 |
| 9 | Bosnia and Herzegovina (BIH) | 0 | 0 | 2 | 2 |
| 11 | Croatia (CRO) | 0 | 0 | 1 | 1 |
| 11 | Morocco (MAR) | 0 | 0 | 1 | 1 |
| 11 | Slovenia (SLO) | 0 | 0 | 1 | 1 |
| Totals (13 entries) | | 13 | 13 | 26 | 52 |
