= Arnela Odžaković =

Bosnian karateka

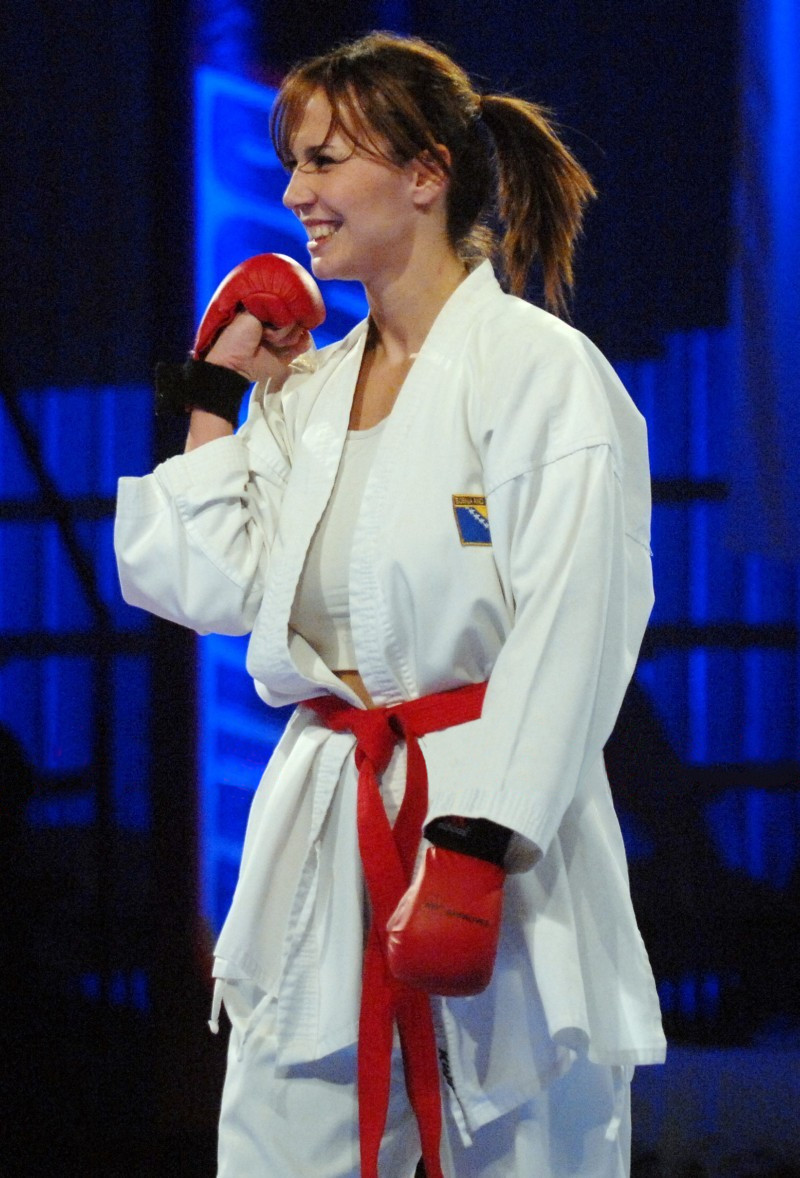
Arnela Odžaković

Arnela Odžaković (born September 5, 1983, in Trebinje, Bosnia and Herzegovina, Yugoslavia) is a Bosnian karateka and sportswoman of the year in 2007.

She finished fifth in the female +60 kg kumite division at the 2006 World Karate Championships. In May 2010, karaterec.com ranked her number 10 among kumite females in the +60 kg division (129th overall).

She started her karate career at the age of 8. Due to circumstances of war in Bosnia and Herzegovina she had to leave her hometown and to stay in Goražde during the war. In 1996 she moved to Sarajevo and became a member of the Sensei Karate Club under instructor Merita Tirić-Čampara. Since the year 2000 she is a member of the Bushido Karate Club in Sarajevo.

During twelve years of her career, she collected more than 150 medals at national and international competitions.

== Facts ==
height 1.71 m (5 ft 7 in) kumite karate category +60 kg

== Achievements ==
- Two time junior European Champion (single and team)
- Gold Medal at the 2005 Mediterranean Games in Spain
- Vice European Champion 2007 (single and team)
- Vice European Champion 2008 (single), third place (team)
- Bronze Medal at the 2009 Mediterranean Games in Italy
- Gold Medal at the 2009 World Games in Taiwan
