= Karate at the 2009 Mediterranean Games =

Karate competition

The karate tournament at the 2009 Mediterranean Games was held in the FEPO Sports Hall from June 30 to July 1, 2009, in Pescara, Italy.

== Medalists ==
=== Men's competition ===
Event	Gold	Silver	Bronze
Kumite −60 kg	(Italy) Michele Giuliani	(Egypt) Amin Ramadan	(Bosnia and Herzegovina) Edin Muslić (Croatia) Danil Domdjoni
Kumite −67 kg	(Greece) Dimitrios Triantafyllis	(Egypt) Mostafa El Sembwiy	(Serbia) Valentin Popa (Syria) Mohammad Sihba
Kumite −75 kg	(France) Kenji Grillon	(Italy) Luigi Busà	(Egypt) Sayed AbdelNabi (Turkey) Serkan Yağcı
Kumite −84 kg	(Greece) Konstantinos Papadopoulos	(Italy) Salvatore Loria	(Egypt) Hany Keshta (France) Jean Taumotekava
Kumite +84 kg	(Spain) Francisco Martínez	(Montenegro) Almir Cecunjanin	(Greece) Spyridon Margaritopoulos (Italy) Stefano Maniscalco

=== Women's competition ===
Event	Gold	Silver	Bronze
Kumite −50 kg	(Turkey) Gülderen Çelik	(Italy) Sara Cardin	(France) Betty Aquilina (Serbia) Biljana Stojović
Kumite −55 kg	(Tunisia) Dhouha Ben Othman	(Croatia) Jelena Kovačević	(Algeria) Ilhem El Djou (Italy) Selene Guglielmi
Kumite −61 kg	(France) Lolita Dona	(Italy) Laura Pasqua	(Spain) Carmen Vicente (Turkey) Vildan Doğan
Kumite −68 kg	(Croatia) Petra Volf	(Greece) Vasiliki Panetsidou	(Bosnia and Herzegovina) Arnela Odžaković (Spain) Irene Colomar
Kumite +68 kg	(Egypt) Shymaa Elsayed	(Bosnia and Herzegovina) Merima Softić	(Spain) Cristina Feo (Turkey) Yıldız Aras

=== Medal table ===
Rank	Nation	Gold medal	Silver medal	Bronze medal	Total
1	Greece	2	1	1	4
2	France	2	0	2	4
3	Italy	1	4	2	7
4	Egypt	1	2	2	5
5	Croatia	1	1	1	3
6	Spain	1	0	3	4
6	Turkey	1	0	3	4
8	Tunisia	1	0	0	1
9	Bosnia and Herzegovina	0	1	2	3
10	Montenegro	0	1	0	1
11	Serbia	0	0	2	2
12	Algeria	0	0	1	1
12	Syria	0	0	1	1
Total		10	10	20	40
