= United Arab Republic at the 1959 Mediterranean Games =

- IOC code: UAR
- NOC: United Arab Republic Olympic Committee

in Beirut
- Medals Ranked 2nd: Gold 23 Silver 21 Bronze 30 Total 74

Mediterranean Games appearances (overview)
- 1959; 1963

Other related appearances
- Egypt (1951–1955, 1971–pres.); Syria (1951–1955, 1963–pres.)

United Arab Republic containing Egypt and Syria participated at the 1959 Mediterranean Games held in Beirut, Lebanon.

== United Arab Republic medals by sport ==
Sport	Gold	Silver	Bronze	Total
Gymnastics	6	4	5	15
Weightlifting	5	1	1	7
Equestrian	4	5	3	12
Boxing	3	1	3	7
Wrestling	2	6	5	13
Diving	1	1	1	3
Fencing	1	1	1	3
Shooting	1	1	0	2
Athletics	0	1	7	8
Basketball	0	0	1	1
Sailing	0	0	1	1
Swimming	0	0	1	1
Water polo	0	0	1	1
Totals (13 entries)	23	21	30	74
