= Strangers (disambiguation) =

Strangers are people who are unknown to another person or group.

Strangers or The Strangers may also refer to:

== History ==
- Elizabethan Strangers or Strangers, a name applied to French and Belgian immigrants to Norwich, East Anglia, England, during the Middle Ages
- Strangers (Parliament of the United Kingdom), people in the Houses of Parliament who are not Members of Parliament or officials

== Books ==
- Strangers, novel by Anita Brookner, 2009
- Strangers (Dozois novel), 1978
- Strangers, novel by Barbara Ewing, 1978
- Strangers (Koontz novel), 1986
- Strangers, novel by Rosie Thomas, 1987
- Strangers: A Family Romance, autobiography by Emma Tennant, 1998
- Strangers, collection by Antonia White, 1954
- Strangers (Yamada novel), 1987
- The Strangers, novel by Mort Castle, 1984
- The Strangers, novel by Ann Schlee, 1971
- The Strangers, novel by William E. Wilson, 1952
- The Strangers, novel by katherena vermette, 2021
- Strangers: A Memoir of Marriage, non-fiction work by Belle Burden, 2026

== Comics ==
- Strangers (French comic book), a series published by Semic Comics in France and Image Comics in the U.S.
- Strangers (Marvel Comics), a pair of comic book characters
- The Strangers (Malibu Comics), a comic book series

== Film ==
- Strangers, the title of the original 1954 theatrical release of Roberto Rossellini's Journey to Italy
- Strangers: The Story of a Mother and Daughter, a 1979 American TV film starring Bette Davis and Gena Rowlands
- Strangers (1991 film), an Australian film
- Strangers (1992 film), an American TV film starring Linda Fiorentino
- Strangers (2007 Hindi film), an Indian Hindi-language movie starring Jimmy Shergill
- Strangers (2007 Israeli film), an Israeli experimental fictional film by Guy Nattiv and Erez Tadmor
- Strangers (2022 film), a Nigerian drama
- The Strangers (film series), a series of American psychological-slasher horror films
  - The Strangers (2008 film), the first film in the series
  - The Strangers: Prey at Night, a 2018 sequel
  - The Strangers: Chapter 1, 2024 film that is the first film in a trilogy
  - The Strangers – Chapter 2, 2025 film that is the second film in a trilogy
  - The Strangers – Chapter 3, 2026 film that is the third and final film in a trilogy
- The Strangers (2012 film), a Philippine film

== Podcasts ==
- Strangers (podcast), an independent podcast hosted by Lea Thau

== Television ==
- Strangers (1978 TV series), an ITV police drama set in the North West of England
- Strangers (1989 TV series), a New Zealand children's mystery drama television series
- Strangers (1996 TV series), a French-Canadian anthology series, with one episode directed by Damian Harris
- Strangers (2017 TV series), an American comedy-drama streaming television series
- Strangers (2018 TV series), an ITV drama series set in Hong Kong
- "Strangers" (thirtysomething), an episode of the series Thirtysomething
- "Strangers" (The Walking Dead), an episode of the television series The Walking Dead

== Music ==
=== Artists ===
- The Strangers (American band), a band that backed Merle Haggard
- The Strangers (Australian band), Australian band
- The Strangers with Mike Shannon, South African outfit

=== Albums ===
- Strangers (Ed Harcourt album), 2004
- Strangers (Merle Haggard album), 1965
- Strangers (Marissa Nadler album), 2016
- The Strangers (soundtrack), from the 2008 film (see above)
- Strangers (video), Keane documentary DVD
- Strangers, international debut album by Tomoyasu Hotei

=== Songs ===
- "Strangers" (Bring Me the Horizon song), 2022
- "Strangers" (City and Colour song), 2019
- "Strangers" (Ethel Cain song), 2022
- "Strangers" (Lewis Capaldi song), 2024
- "Strangers" (Goldie Boutilier song), 2012
- "Strangers" (Halsey song), 2017
- "Strangers" (Kenya Grace song), 2023
- "Strangers" (The Kinks song), 1970
- "Strangers" (Laura Tesoro and Loïc Nottet song), 2020
- "Strangers" (Seven Lions and Myon & Shane 54 song), 2013
- "Strangers" (Sigrid song), 2017
- "Strangers" (Tia Gostelow song), 2018
- "Strangers" (Van She song), 2008
- "(My Friends Are Gonna Be) Strangers", by Merle Haggard, 1994
- "Strangers", by David Gates from Never Let Her Go, 1975
- "Strangers", by Dom Dolla and Mansionair, 2021
- "Strangers", by DragonForce from Extreme Power Metal, 2019
- "Strangers", by Elton John from A Single Man, 1998 reissue
- "Strangers", by Giveon from Beloved, 2025
- "Strangers", by James from Millionaires, 1999
- "Strangers", by Jonas Brothers from Happiness Begins, 2019
- "Strangers", by Portishead from Dummy, 1994
- "Strangers", by Taeyeon from Letter to Myself, 2024
- "Strangers", by Ted Nugent from Little Miss Dangerous, 1986
- "Strangers", by Theory of a Deadman from Say Nothing, 2020
- "The Strangers", by St. Vincent from Actor, 2009

== See also ==
- The Stranger (disambiguation), includes use of Stranger
- Familiar stranger (disambiguation)
- Perfect Stranger (disambiguation)
- Strange (disambiguation)
- Strangers on a Train (film)
- The Strangerers, British television science fiction comedy drama serial
