= Stranger (disambiguation) =

A stranger is a person that is unknown to others.

The Stranger or Stranger may also refer to:

== Characters ==
- Stranger (Marvel Comics), a character in the Marvel Comics Universe
- Stranger (Myst), a character in the Myst series
- The Stranger, a character in Nocturne
- The Stranger (Oddworld), a character in Oddworld: Stranger's Wrath
- The Stranger, a character from the Star Wars television series The Acolyte
- The Stranger, a character in The Big Lebowski
- The Stranger, a character in The Walking Dead
- The Stranger (When a Stranger Calls), a character in the When a Stranger Calls films

== Film ==
- The Stranger (1910 film), a short drama
- The Stranger (1918 film), a film starring Oliver Hardy
- The Stranger (1920 film), a film starring Hoot Gibson
- The Stranger (1924 film), a film starring Richard Dix
- The Stranger (1931 film), a French-German film directed by Fred Sauer
- The Stranger (1946 film), a film by Orson Welles
- The Stranger (1962 film) or The Intruder, an American film by Roger Corman, starring William Shatner
- The Stranger (1967 film), an Italian film directed by Luchino Visconti and based on Camus's novel
- The Stranger (1973 film) or Stranded in Space, a science-fiction TV pilot starring Glenn Corbett
- The Stranger (1984 film), a South Korean film
- The Stranger (1987 film), an Argentine-American film directed by Adolfo Aristarain
- The Stranger (1991 film) or Agantuk, a film by Satyajit Ray
- The Stranger (1995 film), a martial arts-action film by Fritz Kiersch
- The Stranger (2000 film), an Austrian film by Götz Spielmann
- Stranger (2001 film) or Ajnabee, an Indian film directed by Abbas-Mustan, starring Akshay Kumar
- A Stranger (2005 film) or Ek Ajnabee, an Indian film directed by Apoorva Lakhia, starring Amitabh Bachchan
- The Stranger (2005 film) or Anniyan, an Indian psychological film by S. Shankar
- Stranger, a 2006 South Korean film starring Lee Ji-hoon
- Stranger, a 2009 film with Andrew Stevens
- The Stranger (2010 film), an action film starring Steve Austin
- The Stranger (2012 film), a Turkish film
- The Stranger (2014 film), a Chilean English-language thriller produced by Eli Roth
- Stranger (2015 film), a Kazakhstani film
- The Stranger (2021 film), a Palestinian film
- The Stranger (2022 film), an Australian crime thriller
- The Stranger (2025 film), a French film written and directed by François Ozon and based on Camus's novel
- The Stranger (video series), a direct-to-video science fiction series starring Colin Baker

== Television ==
=== Episodes ===
- "The Stranger", Afsos episode 4 (2020)
- "The Stranger", Alcoa Presents One Step Beyond season 3, episode 22 (1961)
- "The Stranger", Animorphs season 1, episode 12 (1998)
- "The Stranger", Armchair Theatre series 5, episode 11 (1960)
- "The Stranger", Benson season 7, episode 4 (1985)
- "The Stranger", Bonanza season 1, episode 24 (1960)
- "The Stranger", Brothers (1984) season 2, episode 19 (1985)
- "The Stranger", Criminal Minds season 6, episode 21 (2011)
- "The Stranger", Dick Powell's Zane Grey Theatre season 2, episode 20 (1958)
- "The Stranger", Dixon of Dock Green series 17, episode 5 (1970)
- "The Stranger", Edge of Alaska season 3, episode 3 (2016)
- "The Stranger", Fat Albert and the Cosby Kids season 1, episode 3 (1972)
- "The Stranger", Flamingo Road season 2, episode 5 (1981)
- "The Stranger", Greenleaf season 4, episode 6 (2019)
- "The Stranger", House of Ninjas episode 6 (2024)
- "The Stranger", Johnny Ringo episode 32 (1960)
- "The Stranger", Land of the Lost season 1, episode 6 (1974)
- "The Stranger", Laramie season 4, episode 28 (1963)
- "The Stranger", Little House on the Prairie season 4, episode 19 (1978)
- "The Stranger", Medical Center season 7, episode 19 (1976)
- "The Stranger", Once Upon a Time season 1, episode 20 (2012)
- "The Stranger", Onyx Equinox episode 4 (2020)
- "The Stranger", Pistols 'n' Petticoats episode 18 (1967)
- "The Stranger", Read All About It! season 1, episode 2 (1979)
- "The Stranger", Star Wars Forces of Destiny season 1, episode 7 (2017)
- "The Stranger", Straightaway episode 7 (1961)
- "The Stranger", The 100 season 7, episode 12 (2020)
- "The Stranger", The Everglades episode 31 (1962)
- "The Stranger", The First 48 season 9, episode 12a (2010)
- "The Stranger", The Flying Doctors series 9, episode 7 (1991)
- "The Stranger", The Life and Times of Grizzly Adams season 2, episode 20 (1978)
- "The Stranger", The Loop (American) season 2, episode 10 (2007)
- "The Stranger", The New Lassie season 2, episode 6 (1961)
- "The Stranger", The Onedin Line series 2, episode 2 (1973)
- "The Stranger", The Virginian season 7, episode 26 (1969)
- "The Stranger", Tron: Uprising episode 13 (2012)
- "The Stranger", Without a Trace season 4, episode 15 (2006)
- "The Stranger", Yakari (2005) season 1, episode 6 (2005)
- "The Stranger", Young Dr. Kildare episode 2 (1972)

=== Shows ===
- Stranger (TV series), a 2017 South Korean TV series on tvN
- The Stranger (Australian TV series), a 1964 series featuring Ron Haddrick
- The Stranger (1954 TV series), a 1954–1955 American TV series on the DuMont network
- The Stranger (British TV series), a 2020 adaptation for Netflix of the 2015 Harlan Coben novel
- The Stranger (2020 American TV series), a 2020 American TV series on Quibi

== Literature and other media ==
- Stranger (magazine), an English lifestyle magazine
- The Stranger (newspaper), an alternative newspaper in Seattle, Washington
- "The Stranger" (essay), an essay by Georg Simmel
- The Stranger (Camus novel), a 1942 novella by Albert Camus
- The Stranger (Coben novel), 2015, by Harlan Coben
- The Stranger (Applegate novel), a 1997 book in the Animorphs series
- The Stranger (Van Allsburg book), a 1986 book by Chris Van Allsburg
- The Stranger (short story collection), a 1987 book by Gordon R. Dickson
- "The Stranger" (Mansfield short story), 1921, by Katherine Mansfield
- "The Stranger" (Salinger short story), 1945, by J. D. Salinger
- The Stranger (comic book), a 2013 comic book by Jacques Ferrandez, based on the novel by Camus
- "The Stranger", a poem by Rudyard Kipling
- "The Stranger", a short story by Ambrose Bierce

== Theatre ==
- The Stranger, a 1908 play by Anthony E. Wills
- The Stranger, an English translation of the 1798 play Menschenhass und Reue (Misanthropy and Repentance) by August von Kotzebue

== Music ==
=== Albums ===
- The Stranger (album) or the title song (see below), by Billy Joel, 1977
- Stranger (Gen Hoshino album), 2013
- Stranger (Valient Thorr album), 2010
- Stranger (Yung Lean album), 2017
- The Stranger, by Daniel Jordan released by Reel Life Productions, 2011
- The Stranger, by E Sens, 2019
- The Stranger (EP), by Creeper, 2016

=== Songs ===
- "The Stranger" (Billy Joel song), 1977
- "The Stranger" (Ingrid Andress song), 2017
- "Stranger" (Electric Light Orchestra song), 1983
- "Stranger" (Hilary Duff song), 2007
- "Stranger" (Peking Duk song), 2016
- "Stranger" (The Rasmus song), 2012
- "Stranger" (Sunmi song), 2023
- "The Stranger", by Christine and the Queens from Chris, 2018
- "The Stranger", by the Shadows from The Shadows to the Fore, 1961
- "The Stranger Song", by Leonard Cohen from Songs of Leonard Cohen, 1967
- "Stranger", by Black Lips from We Did Not Know the Forest Spirit Made the Flowers Grow, 2004
- "Stranger", by Dr. Dog from Shame, Shame, 2010
- "Stranger", by Goldfrapp from Tales of Us, 2013
- "Stranger", by Jefferson Starship from Modern Times, 1981
- "Stranger", by Kris Kristofferson from Who's to Bless and Who's to Blame, 1975
- "Stranger", by Lauv from All 4 Nothing, 2022
- "Stranger", by Leonid Rudenko, 2011
- "Stranger", by Olivia Addams, 2021
- "Stranger", by Olivia Rodrigo from Guts (Spilled), 2024
- "Stranger", by the Presidents of the United States of America from The Presidents of the United States of America, 1995
- "Stranger", by Secondhand Serenade from A Twist in My Story, 2008
- "Stranger", by Shinee from The First, 2011
- "Stranger", by Skrillex and KillaGraham featuring Sam Dew from Recess, 2014
- "Stranger", by Soul Asylum from Say What You Will, Clarence... Karl Sold the Truck, 1984
- "Stranger", by Usher from Versus, 2010
- "Stranger", by Vampire Weekend from Father of the Bride2019

=== Artists ===
- The Stranger, a pseudonym of English ambient musician James Leyland Kirby

== Other uses ==
- Stranger (video game), a 2007 real-time strategy game
- Stranger, Texas, US, an unincorporated community
- Lacanobia blenna or the Stranger, a moth in the family Noctuidae
- Portrait of an Unknown Woman or Stranger, an 1883 painting by Ivan Kramskoi
- Nickname of Heath L'Estrange (born 1985), Australian former rugby league footballer

== See also ==
- Strange (disambiguation)
- Stranger danger, the idea or warning that all strangers can potentially be dangerous
- Strangers (disambiguation), includes uses of The Strangers
- The Exo Stranger/Elisabeth Bray, a character in the Destiny video game franchise
