= Strange (comics) =

Strange, in comics, may refer to:

- Strange (comic book), a six-issue comic book limited series by Marvel Comics
- Strange, a Marvel Comics character and one of two characters who together were known as the Strangers
- Adam Strange, fictional DC Comics superhero
- Doc Strange, fictional Thrilling Comics character
- Doctor Strange, fictional Marvel Comics sorcerer
- Hugo Strange, fictional DC Comics character
- Strange Visitor, a DC Comics character who appeared alongside Superman

== See also ==
- Strange (disambiguation)
- Strangers (disambiguation)
