= L'Étranger (disambiguation) =

L'Étranger is a 1942 novel by Albert Camus.

L'Étranger may also refer to:

== Film ==
- L'Étranger, a French film distributed in English as The Stranger (2025 film)

== Comics ==
- The Stranger (comic book) (French: L'Étranger), a 2013 comic book by Jacques Ferrandez, based on the novel by Camus
- L'étranger series, a BL manga series by Kanna Kii

== Literature ==
- "L'Étranger", a poem by Charles Baudelaire

== Music ==
- L'Étranger (band), a 1980s Canadian punk band
- "L'Étranger", a song (1934) by Édith Piaf
- "L'étranger (voleur d'eau)", a 2018 song by Christine and the Queens
- L'étranger, an opera by Vincent d'Indy
