= Familiar stranger (disambiguation) =

A familiar stranger is an individual that is recognized, but not known.

Familiar stranger may also refer to:

== Film ==
- The Familiar Stranger, a 2001 American television film
- Familiar Strangers, a 2008 American comedy-drama film

== Music ==
- Familiar Stranger (Bob Evans album), 2013
- Familiar Stranger (Mark Wills album), 2008
- Familiar Stranger: the Early Works of Geoff Moore, a 1995 album by Geoff Moore

== See also ==
- Perfect Stranger (disambiguation)
- The Stranger (disambiguation)
