= Palm Reader =

A palm reader claims to characterize and foretell the future through the study of the palm of the hand.

Palm Reader may also refer to:

- "Palm Reader", a song from the 2015 album No Closer to Heaven by The Wonder Years
- "Palm Reader", a song from the 2003 album Out of the Vein by Third Eye Blind
- "Palm Reader", a song from the 2005 album Total Universe Man by Valient Thorr
- "Palm Reader", a song from the 2006 album I Care by Rachelle Ann Go
- Palm Reader, a 2005 album by ZZZZ, formerly Sweep the Leg Johnny
- "Palm Reader (series) is a Russian drama television series from the 2005

== See also ==
- E-book, a book publication made available in digital form
