= Kamel Daoud =

Algerian writer and journalist

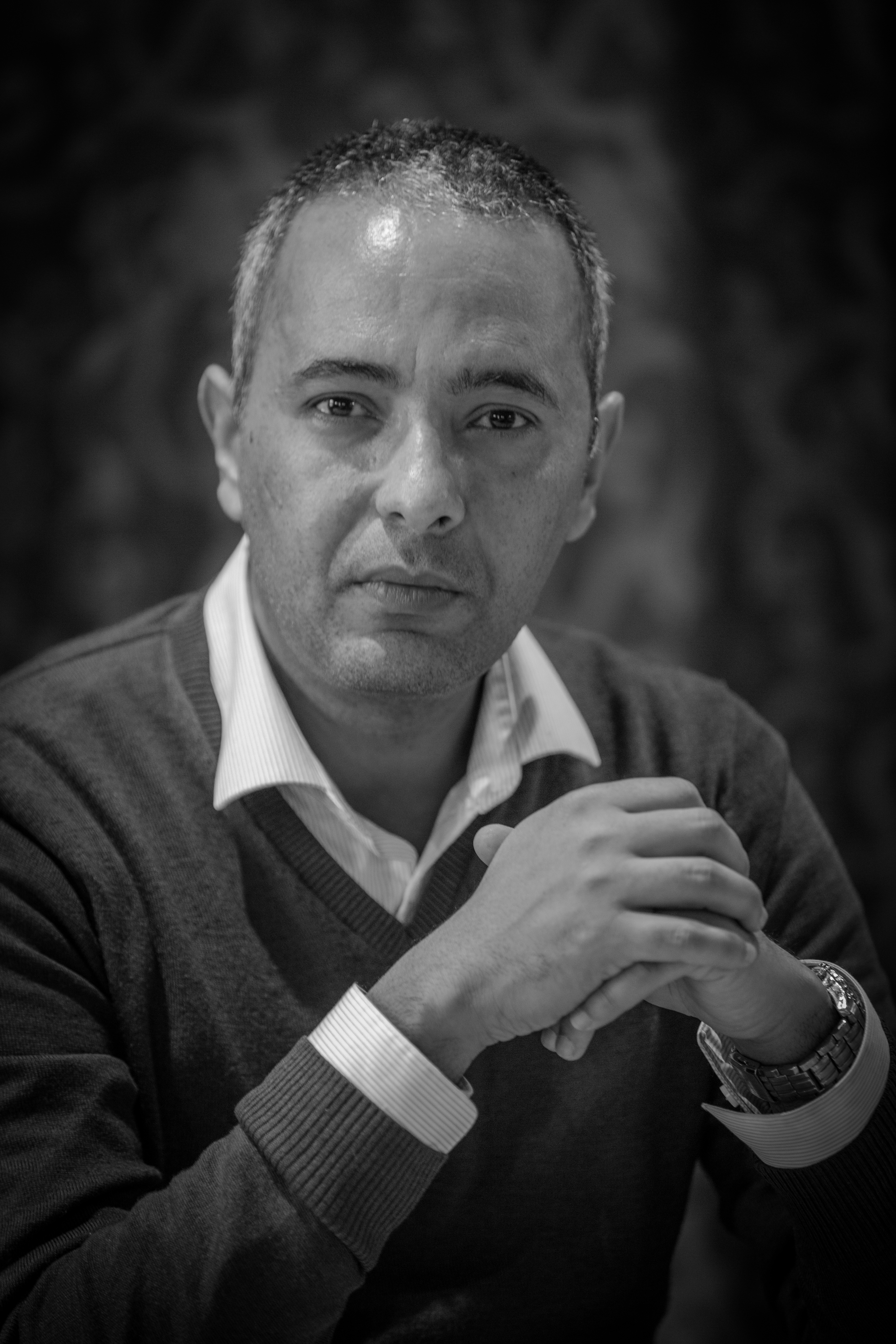
Kamel Daoud (2015)

Kamel Daoud (Arabic: كمال داود; born June 17, 1970) is an Algerian writer and journalist. He is best known for his 2013 novel Meursault, contre-enquête (The Meursault Investigation) and his 2024 novel Houris.

== Early life and education ==
Kamel Daoud was born in Mostaganem, Algeria, on June 17, 1970, the oldest of six children in an Arabic-speaking Muslim family. His father was a police officer who travelled around the country for work, and Daoud was brought up by his grandparents in a small town called Mesra. His parents and grandparents were uneducated, and none of his siblings went on to further studies. Daoud read Jules Verne et l'Ile mystérieuse in French 10 times, books on Greek mythology, and then started reading Arab and Muslim literature, in French translation.

After initially starting studies in mathematics, he switched to study French literature at the University of Oran.

== Writing career ==
=== Journalism ===
In 1994, Daoud began working for Le Quotidien d'Oran, a French-language Algerian newspaper. In 1998 he wrote about the massacre at Had Chekala massacre, which was one of a number of villages where hundreds of inhabitants were killed during Ramadan by Islamist forces. Around 1997 or 2000, he started publishing his own column three years later, titled "Raina raikoum" ("Our opinion, your opinion"). He was the editor-in-chief of the newspaper for eight years. In 2011 he was editor of the paper and still writing the column.

As of 2015 he was a columnist in various media, an editorialist in the online newspaper Algérie-Focus and his articles were also published in Slate Afrique. After the success of his novel Meursault, contre-enquête in France in 2014, he started writing opinion pieces on a range of issues for the conservative French weekly magazine Le Point. In early 2016, Daoud announced that he would be giving up his newspaper work and concentrating on writing fiction.

In 2018, his Le Quotidien d'Oran articles (2010-2016) were translated into English, as Chroniques: Selected Columns: 2010-2016.

=== Fiction ===
Daoud began writing short fiction, becoming famous in Algeria in the 2000s.

Daoud's debut novel, Meursault, contre-enquête (translated as The Meursault Investigation, grew from a piece he had published Le Monde in 2010, which his colleagues encouraged him to expand. The novel, first published in Algeria in 2013, then in France in 2014, was acclaimed by critics not only in France, but also in Anglophone countries. Critics in New York Review of Books, The Guardian, and the New York Times praised the novel. It won the Prix Goncourt du Premier Roman (Goncourt Prize for a First Novel), as well as the Prix François Mauriac (Aquitaine) and the Prix des cinq continents de la francophonie. It was also shortlisted for the Prix Renaudot. In April 2015, an excerpt from The Meursault Investigation was featured in the New Yorker magazine. The novel was a retelling, or "counterinvestigation" of Albert Camus's L'Etranger. It was denounced by Islamists as blasphemy.

In 2017 he published Zabor ou Les psaumes (published in English as Zabor, or The Psalms in 2021). The novel references to many Western novels, notably Robinson Crusoe.

His 2024 novel Houris, which was published in France but not Algeria, is set during the 1990s civil war in Algeria, also known as the "Black Decade", when the government fought armed Islamist groups. This period is regarded as a delicate subject and not taught in schools. There has been criticism of the government for passing laws that provided clemency to Islamist fighters who put down their weapons (1999) and then a broader reconciliation law in 2005, widening the amnesty. The war is seen through the eyes of a pregnant 26-year-old woman who had survived the Had Chekala massacre in January 1998, as a child, which had left a large scar across her neck. In November 2024, the novel was awarded the Prix Goncourt, with the judges praising the author for giving "voice to the suffering associated with a dark period in Algeria's history, particularly that of women". Eleven days after the awards ceremony, a young woman, Saâda Arbane, claimed on a TV news show that the story in the novel was based on her real-life experiences. As of February 2026, Arbane is suing Daoud in both Algeria and France, under differing legislation. She is represented by well-known French human rights lawyer William Bourdon, while Daoud is represented by Jacqueline Laffont-Haïk.

The novel has received a mixed reception in Algeria, but even critics agree that the Algerian media campaign against Daoud has been relentless.

=== Ongoing work ===
As of February 2026, Daoud's work has been translated into 35 languages. He writes for French outlets about Algeria and contemporary affairs.

== Views ==
As a teenager in the 1980s, Daoud was a follower of the emerging Islamic movement in Algeria until he was around 18, but this turned to disillusion and then open opposition to overt or extreme religiosity. He has frequently criticised aspects of the Arab-Muslim world. In 2011 he was briefly arrested for participating in a demonstration.

In his columns in Le Quotidien d'Oran, Daoud repeatedly wrote about the president of Algeria, Abdelaziz Bouteflika, admitting to being somewhat obsessed with him. However he did not align himself with any political party or candidate in elections. He frequently received letters from Islamists who regarded him as unholy, although, in his words, he knows the Qur'an better than they do. According to his former editor, Soufiane Hadjadj, Daoud "wasn't an ally of power, but he wasn't an opponent" in those days; it was only after Bouteflika's successor, Abdelmadjid Tebboune, came to power in 2019, that his criticism of the regime ramped up.

After starting to appear on French TV and radio, he became a well-known voice on Algerian matters that included criticism of the former French colony. On 13 December 2014, in an interview on the public television program On n'est pas couché, Daoud said of his relationship to Islam: "If we do not come to a decision on the place of God in the "Arab" world, we are not going to revitalize humanity, we are not going to move forward. The religious question is becoming vital in the Arab world. We must settle it in order to move forward". Three days later, Abdelfattah Hamadache Zeraoui, a Salafist imam at the time working on Echorouk News, declared that Daoud should be put to death for his statements (that is, a fatwa). Zeraoui later reiterated his threats on Ennahar TV. Daoud filed a complaint in Algerian court and the judiciary delivered a judgment on March 8, 2016 that Daoud's attorney called "unprecedented": Zeraoui was sentenced to three to six months in prison and a 50,000-dinar fine. However, the judgment was set aside in June 2016 by the Oran Court of Appeal on the basis of a jurisdiction challenge.

The November 20, 2015, issue of the New York Times featured an op-ed by Daoud titled "Saudi Arabia, an ISIS That Has Made It" in both English and French, that was highly critical of Saudi Arabia. The February 14, 2016, issue of the New York Times featured a controversial second op-ed piece by Daoud, "The Sexual Misery of the Arab World" in English, French, and Arabic. Both of these articles were republished in his 2017 collection of essays Mes Indépendances.

After legal action was launched against him in Algeria and France by the alleged subject of his latest novel, Algeria issued two international arrest warrants for Daoud. Douad announced that he had been judged in absentia and convicted to three years of prison and a five million dinar (€32,000) fine for the publication of Houris on the basis of Article 46 of the executive order (2005) implementing the Charter for Peace and National Reconciliation, which punishes the use of "the wounds of the national tragedy" to "harm state institutions" or "damage the image of Algeria".

== Awards and honours ==
- 2014: Prix François Mauriac (Aquitaine), for Meursault, contre-enquête
- 2014: Prix des cinq continents de la francophonie, Meursault, contre-enquête
- 2014: Meursault, contre-enquête shortlisted for the Prix Renaudot
- 2015: Prix Goncourt du Premier Roman (Goncourt Prize for a First Novel), for Meursault, contre-enquête
- 2019: Prix mondial Cino Del Duca, a lifetime achievement award
- 2024: Prix Goncourt for Houris

== Personal life ==
Daoud divorced his first wife in 2008 after she had become increasingly religious. He is the father of two children, and dedicated his novel The Meursault Investigation to them. His current wife, Aïcha Dahdouh, is the psychologist to whom Saâda Arbane said she revealed details of her personal life, which found their way into Daoud's 2024 novel.

He lived in the coastal city of Oran for many years.

In 2022, on a state visit to Algeria, President Macron had dinner with Daoud. Daoud moved to France in 2023, after the head of the secret service in Oran invited him in "for a cup of coffee", which, according to Daoud, was the prelude to an arrest.

== Selected works ==
=== Novels ===
- Meursault, contre-enquête (Éditions Barzakh, 2013). The Meursault Investigation, trans. John Cullen (Other Press, 2015)
- Zabor ou Les psaumes (Actes Sud, 2017); in English translation by Emma Ramadan Zabor, or The Psalms (Other Press, 2021)
- Houris (2024)

=== Novellas and short stories ===
- La Fable du nain (Dar El Gharb, 2003)
- Ô Pharaon (2005)
- La Préface du négre : nouvelles (2008), a collection of short stories, republished as Le Minotaure 504 in 2011
  - Includes: L'Ami d’Athènes; Gibrîl au Kérosène; La Préface du nègre; L’Arabe et le vaste pays de Ô
  - Includes: Le Minotaure 504; Gibrîl au Kérosène; L'Ami d’Athènes; La Préface du nègre
- La Préface du nègre, Le Minotaure 504 et autres nouvelles (Actes Sud, 2015)
  - Includes: L’Ami d’Athènes; Le Minotaure 504; Gibrîl au Kérosène; La Préface du nègre; L’Arabe et le vaste pays de Ô

Stories (Note: Short stories unless otherwise noted.)

- "Musa" (2015), an excerpt from The Meursault Investigation.

=== Non-fiction ===
- Chroniques Mac-Arabe: Raïna Raïkoum (2005), a collection of essays
- Mes indépendences – Chroniques 2010-2016 (Éditions Barzakh and Actes Sud, 2017). Chroniques: Selected Columns, 2010-2016, trans. Elisabeth Zerofsky (Other Press, 2018).
- Le Peintre dévorant la femme (Stock, 2018).
