= The Meursault Investigation =

2013 novel by Kamel Daoud

- First edition
- Author: Kamel Daoud
- Original title: Meursault, contre-enquête
- Translator: John Cullen
- Language: French
- Genre: Philosophical novel
- Published: 2013 by Barzakh Editions (French)
- Publication place: Algeria
- Pages: 191 pp
- Awards: Prix Goncourt du Premier Roman (2015); Prix François-Mauriac (2014)
- ISBN: 978-9931-325-56-7
- OCLC: 874450228
- Dewey Decimal: 843.92
- LC Class: PQ3989.3.D365

The Meursault Investigation (French: Meursault, contre-enquête) is the first novel by the Algerian writer and journalist Kamel Daoud. It is a retelling of Albert Camus' 1942 novel The Stranger. First published in Algeria by Barzakh Editions in October 2013, it was reissued in France by Actes Sud (May 2014). The book was nominated for many prizes and awards.

== Relationship to Camus' The Stranger ==
Meursault, the protagonist of Albert Camus' novel The Stranger, murders a character known only as "the Arab", saying, in his trial, that the murder was a meaningless gesture caused by sunstroke or God's absence. Camus left Meursault's victim nameless, but Kamel Daoud gives him a name: Musa. The Meursault Investigation revisits these events, but from the point of view of Harun, Musa's brother.

Giving a name to Meursault's nameless victim, for Daoud, is about more than just revisiting a minor character. In an interview with the Los Angeles Review of Books, Daoud said: "Ever since the Middle Ages, the white man has the habit of naming Africa and Asia's mountains and insects, all the while denying the names of the human beings they encounter. By removing their names, they render banal murder and crimes. By claiming your own name, you are also making a claim of your humanity and thus the right to justice."

In the same interview, when asked what prompted him to write the book, Daoud stressed the centrality of The Stranger to his identity as an Algerian Francophone writer. In other outlets, Daoud has confirmed the integral role that The Stranger played in the genesis of The Meursault Investigation, describing his novel as "a dialogue with Camus."

Daoud also refers to another of Camus's novels, The Fall, in his novel.

== Reception ==
After the book was translated into English by John Cullen and published by Other Press in 2015, it received positive reviews in the English-language publications. Azadeh Moaveni, writing for the Financial Times, called it "perhaps the most important novel to emerge out of the Middle East in recent memory." Writing for the New York Times Book Review, Laila Lalami described it as Daoud's "rich and inventive new novel." Michiko Kakutani called it "stunning." In April 2015, an excerpt of The Meursault Investigation was featured in The New Yorker.

== Honors and awards ==
- 2014: Winner, Prix François Mauriac (Aquitaine)
- 2014: Winner, Prix des cinq continents de la francophonie
- 2014: Shortlisted, Prix Renaudot
- 2015: Winner, Prix Goncourt du Premier Roman (Goncourt Prize for a First Novel)
