= Ahmed Benzelikha =

Algerian journalist

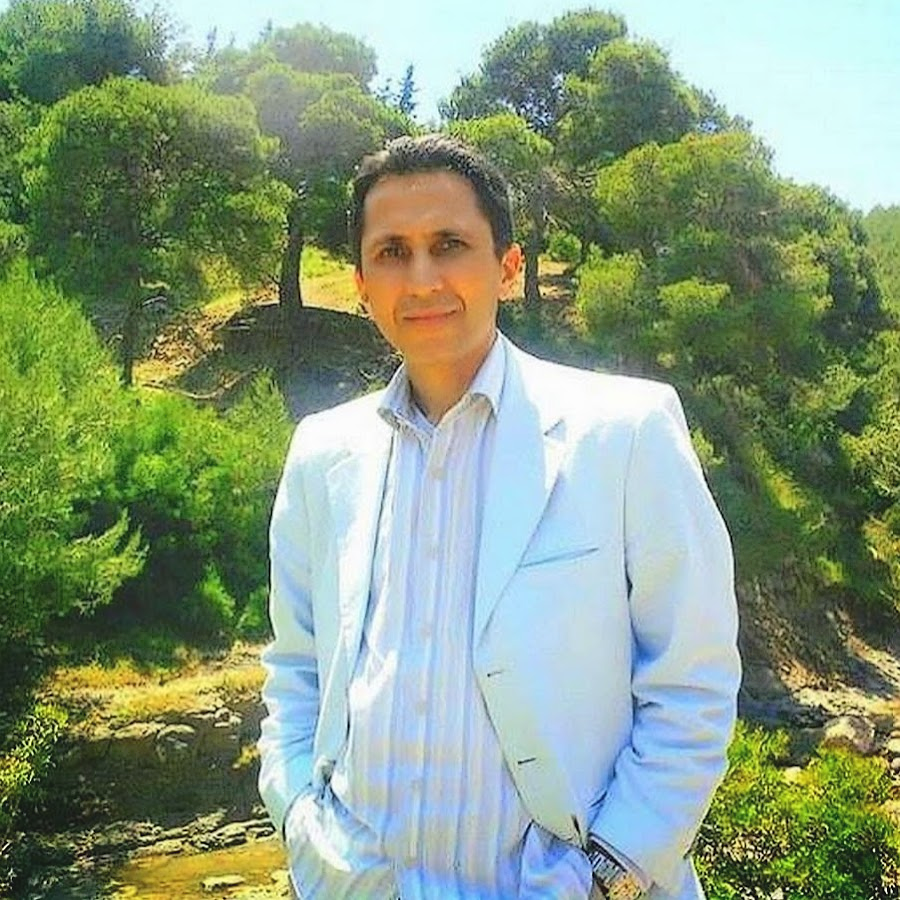
- Born: 1967 (age 58–59); Algeria
- Occupations: journalist, writer, and columnist

Ahmed Benzelikha (Arabic: أحمد بن زليخة), is an Algerian journalist, writer, and economist. He is known for being a columnist in El Watan and Le Quotidien d'Oran newspapers.

== Career ==
Ahmed Benzelikha held several positions in different sectors such as finance, agriculture, energy, and telecommunication. He also worked as a director in a financial institution, a bureau chief, and an inspector general.

Benzelikha wrote a book entitled Min Agil Thaqfa Jadidah ‘For a New Culture’, which was published in 1989. Moreover, he is known for his anti-colonial activities, humanitarian efforts, and his strive for a new international media system. He wrote an article with the name ‘Algerian Press: Openings and Democracy’, a study on the colonization: A Dignity's work. The study is in response to A Memory's Work by Nicolas Sarkozy.

In addition, he wrote some articles about economic issues and civil society such as his 2003 article entitled What Are the Desired Organisations for a True Participatory Democracy? Moreover, he concentrated on the history of Algeria. He wrote about the 1836 battle of Constantine, Inter-civilizational dialogue (2009), and the heritage of Constantine. Additionally, he is the author of Roh Al-Asr (The Spirit of the Era), which is a socio-political article that was published in 2013. He also wrote the novel Naforat Seedi Husain (My Lord Husain's Fountain), which was published in 2014. In 2017, he published his novel Ruqayyah Cervantes, in honour of Miguel de Cervantes. In 2019, he published Ilyas, a novel that rediscovers Homer's Odyssey. He said that Ilyas bridges between the two banks of the Mediterranean and between the East and the West. In addition, he also wrote a balled entitled Zawraq Al-Kalimat (Words Canoe).

Benzelikha was elected as vice-president of the International Programme for the Development of Communication (IPDC) which belongs to UNESCO. He was also the head of the Algerian committee for the Memory of the World program and The Communications and Information Committee of the Algerian National Commission for UNESCO. He organized many conferences and seminars, mainly on Information Society, media Education, human rights, social cohesion, digital communication, and artificial intelligence.

== Works ==
- Algerian Press: Openings and Democracy
- Tintin des illusions
- Omar and the West
