= Old Salt =

Studio album by Valient Thorr
- Released: July 29, 2016
- Genre: Heavy metal, hard rock
- Length: 57:08
- Label: Napalm Records
- Producer: Benjamin Earl, Ian Millard

Valient Thorr chronology
Our Own Masters (2013)	Old Salt (2016)

Old Salt is the seventh studio album by American heavy metal band Valient Thorr. It was released in July 2016 under Napalm Records, making it their first album not to be released under Volcom Entertainment since their 2003 debut Stranded on Earth.

== Track list ==
No.	Title	Length
1.	"Mirakuru"	4:06
2.	"Lil Knife"	3:48
3.	"Cut and Run"	4:19
4.	"No Count Blues"	3:17
5.	"The Trudge"	5:21
6.	"Worm Up"	5:45
7.	"Spellbroke"	4:15
8.	"Linen Maker"	2:02
9.	"The Shroud"	3:44
10.	"Looking Glass"	3:39
11.	"Jealous Gods"	3:35
12.	"Somnambluance" (bonus track)	5:27
13.	"Deillumination" (bonus track)	8:15
