= Strange =

Strange may refer to:

== Fiction ==
- Strange (comic book), a comic book limited series by Marvel Comics
- Strange (Marvel Comics), one of a pair of Marvel Comics characters known as The Strangers
- Adam Strange, a DC Comics superhero
- The title character of the television series The Journey of Allen Strange
- Doc Strange, a Thrilling Comics character
- Doctor Strange, a Marvel Comics character
  - Stephen Strange (Marvel Cinematic Universe), a film character based on the comic book character
- Hugo Strange, a DC Comics character
- Jonathan Strange, a magician in the novel Jonathan Strange & Mr Norrell by Susanna Clarke and the miniseries adaptation

== Music ==
- Strange (video), a compilation of music videos by Depeche Mode
- Strange Music, a record label founded by Travis O'Guin and rapper Tech N9ne

=== Songs ===
- "Strange" (Agust D song), 2020
- "Strange" (Celeste song), 2019
- "Strange" (En Vogue song), 1991
- "Strange" (Miranda Lambert song), 2022
- "Strange" (Reba McEntire song), 2009
- "Strange" (Wet Wet Wet song), 1997
- "Strange", by Boogiemonsters from Riders of the Storm: The Underwater Album, 1994
- "Strange", by Built to Spill from Ancient Melodies of the Future, 2001
- "Strange", by the Feeling from Twelve Stops and Home, 2006
- "Strange", by Gabrielle Aplin from Dear Happy, 2020
- "Strange", by Galaxie 500 from On Fire, 1989
- "Strange", by Jasan Radford from the soundtrack of Digimon: The Movie, 2000
- "Strange", by Joe Satriani from Flying in a Blue Dream, 1989
- "Strange", by Patsy Cline from She's Got You, 1962
- "Strange", by Poison from Power to the People, 2000
- "Strange", by Screamin' Jay Hawkins, covered by Elvis Costello from Kojak Variety, 1995
- "Strange", by Tokio Hotel and Kerli from the soundtrack of Almost Alice, 2010
- "Strange", by Wire from Pink Flag, 1977

== Other uses ==
- Strange (surname), a family name
- Strangeness, a property of elementary particles in physics
- Strange, Ontario, Canada, a hamlet
- Strange (TV series), a British programme
- Strange+, Japanese manga series
- The Strange, a tabletop RPG
- STRANGE, an acronym for "Social background, Trappability and self-selection, Rearing history, Acclimation and habituation, Natural changes in responsiveness, Genetic makeup, and Experience" in animal psychology test subjects

== See also ==
- "People Are Strange", a 1967 song by the American rock band The Doors
- Strangers (disambiguation)
- Strang (disambiguation)
- The Stranger (disambiguation)
