= Zick Rubin =

American social psychologist, lawyer and author (born 1944)

Isaac Michael "Zick" Rubin (born 1944) is an American social psychologist, lawyer, and author. He is "widely credited as the author of the first empirical measurement of love," for his work distinguishing feelings of like from feelings of love via Rubin's Scales of Liking and Loving. Science Progress stated, "The major breakthrough in research on love came from the pioneer psychometric work of Zick Rubin."

He has also published on disclosing to consequential strangers. According to The Cambridge Handbook of Personal Relationships, Rubin "conducted influential early studies on disclosure reciprocity in naturalistic settings, such as in airport departure lounges and at bus stops." His work also examined the development of friendship among toddlers.

== Life and education ==
Rubin earned a Bachelor of Arts degree from Yale University in 1965 and a Ph.D. from University of Michigan in 1969.

In the 1980s, Rubin entered Harvard Law School, earning his J.D. degree and being admitted to the Massachusetts bar in 1988.

In the 2001 edition of The Penguin Dictionary of Psychology, Rubin was listed as having died in 1997. In 2011 he wrote a New York Times op-ed about his attempts to correct the error after it had been repeated in a Wikia profile about him.

== Career ==
=== Social psychology ===
Rubin won the Socio-psychological Prize from the American Association for the Advancement of Science in 1969. He was director of the Boston Couples Study, described by the Encyclopedia of Human Relationships as "a pioneering longitudinal study" that integrated multiple research methods as it followed the development of relationships over time. Rubin taught at Harvard University from 1967 to 1976 and was the Louis and Frances Salvage Professor of Social Psychology at Brandeis University from 1977 to 1985 before entering law school.

Rubin defended tax-funded work on love after Senator William Proxmire criticized the use of National Science Foundation funding on studies of love at Harvard, the University of Minnesota, and University of Wisconsin. In 1975, Proxmire had named psychologist Ellen Berscheid of University of Minnesota as recipient of his first Golden Fleece Award for her work on love. Proxmire called it "a futile and wasteful attempt to explain the impossible." Rubin defended his colleagues, saying Proxmire was "taking advantage of the fact that it is easy to trivialize and sensationalize such matters as these."

Rubin sued Boston Magazine for copyright infringement after they copied the questions from his liking and loving scales without permission in a 1977 article. He won the case in 1981 and prevailed on appeal.

=== Law ===
Rubin was a lawyer at Palmer & Dodge LLP and then at Hill & Barlow before opening The Law Office of Zick Rubin in 2003. He specializes in legal issues related to copyright, trademark, media, and higher education. In 2020 Rubin joined Archstone Law Group as Of Counsel. On behalf of the daughters of the poet who wrote the lyrics of the nursery school song “Soft Kitty,” he brought a copyright infringement lawsuit against the producers of the popular weather sitcom “The Big Bang Theory,” alleging that they used the song without permission. The case was settled on undisclosed terms.

Rubin had been a member of the Copyright Society of the United States, the Authors Guild, the Text and Academic Authors Association, and the National Association of College and University Attorneys.

== Selected publications ==
- Rubin Z (1973). Liking and loving: An invitation to social psychology. Holt, Rinehart and Winston, ISBN 978-0-03-083003-7
- Rubin Z, Peplau LA (1973). Belief in a Just World and Reactions to Another's Lot: A Study of Participants in the National Draft Lottery. Journal of Social Issues, Volume 29, Issue 4, pages 73–93, Fall 1973 doi:10.1111/j.1540-4560.1973.tb00104.x
- Rubin Z (1974). Doing unto others: joining, molding, conforming, helping, loving. Prentice-Hall, ISBN 978-0-13-217604-0
- Rubin Z (1974). Measurement of romantic love. International Journal of Group Tensions
- Rubin Z, Peplau LA (1975). Who believes in a just world? Journal of Social Issues, Volume 31, Issue 3, pages 65–89, Summer 1975 doi:10.1111/j.1540-4560.1975.tb00997.x
- Rubin Z (1975). Disclosing Oneself to a Stranger: Reciprocity and Its Limits. Journal of Experimental Social Psychology, 11: 233-60
- Hill CT, Rubin Z, Peplau LA (1976). Breakups before marriage: The end of 103 affairs. Journal of Social Issues Volume 32, Issue 1, pages 147–168, Winter 1976 doi:10.1111/j.1540-4560.1976.tb02485.x
- Rubin Z (1980). Children's friendships, Harvard University Press, ISBN 978-0-674-11618-4
- Rubin Z, McNeil EB (1983). The psychology of being human. Harper & Row, ISBN 978-0-06-044378-8
