= Our Own Masters =

Studio album by Valient Thorr
- Released: June 18, 2013
- Genre: Heavy metal, hard rock
- Length: 42:08
- Label: Volcom Entertainment
- Producer: Kyle Spence

Valient Thorr chronology
Stranger (2010)	Our Own Masters (2013)	Old Salt (2016)

Professional ratings
Aggregate scores
Source	Rating
Metacritic	78/100
Review scores
Source	Rating
AllMusic	4/5 stars

Our Own Masters is the sixth studio album by American heavy metal band Valient Thorr. It was released in June 2013 under Volcom Entertainment.

== Track list ==
No.	Title	Length
1.	"Immaculate Consumption"	4:01
2.	"Master Collider"	2:14
3.	"Manipulation"	4:23
4.	"No Strings Attached"	3:20
5.	"Life Hands You Demons"	0:27
6.	"Torn Apart"	5:00
7.	"Cerberus"	3:32
8.	"Good News Bad News"	3:46
9.	"Insatiable"	4:24
10.	"Crowdpleaser"	2:40
11.	"Nervous Energy"	3:34
12.	"Call Off the Dogs"	4:47
