= Perfect Strangers =

Perfect Strangers may refer to:

== Film ==
- Perfect Strangers (1945 film), a film starring Robert Donat and Deborah Kerr
- Perfect Strangers (1950 film), a film starring Ginger Rogers
- Perfect Strangers (1984 film), a film starring Anne Carlisle and Brad Rijn
- Perfect Strangers (2003 film), a film starring Sam Neill
- Perfect Strangers (2004 film), a film starring Rob Lowe and Anna Friel
- Perfect Strangers (2016 film), a film starring Marco Giallini and Valerio Mastandrea
- Perfect Strangers (2017 film), a Spanish remake of the 2016 Italian film
- Perfect Strangers (2018 film), a Mexican remake of the 2016 Italian film
- Perfect Strangers (2022 film), a pan-Arab remake of the 2016 Italian film

== Television ==
- Perfect Strangers (TV series), a 1986–1993 American television sitcom
- Perfect Strangers (TV serial), a 2001 British television drama miniseries

== Music ==
- Perfect Strangers (Deep Purple album), 1984
  - "Perfect Strangers" (Deep Purple song)
- Perfect Strangers (Judi Connelli and Suzanne Johnston album), 1999
- "Perfect Strangers" (INXS song)
- "Perfect Strangers" (Anne Murray song)
- "Perfect Strangers" (Jonas Blue song)
- "Perfect Strangers", a 2018 song by Lil Wayne from Tha Carter V
- Perfect Strangers, an Australian band from in the 1980s.
- Madchild + Moka Only are… Perfect Strangers, a 2001 EP by Madchild and Moka Only
- Perfeck Strangers, a hip-hop group consisting of Dan-e-o and Promise

== Other uses ==
- Invincible Vol. 3: Perfect Strangers, a trade paperback in the Invincible comic book series

== See also ==
- Perfect Stranger (disambiguation)
- Absolute Strangers, a film about abortion
