= Consequential strangers =

Personal connections other than family and close friends

Consequential strangers are personal connections other than family and close friends. Also known as "peripheral" or "weak" ties, they lie in the broad social territory between strangers and intimates. The term was coined by Karen L. Fingerman and further developed by Melinda Blau, who collaborated with the psychologist to explore and popularize the concept.

Social life in the 21st century includes a wide array of personal connections, not just intimates—people associated with a particular part of one's life and daily activities, such as co-workers, neighbors, gym buddies, fellow volunteers and congregants, and providers of goods and services. Typically, peripheral ties far outnumber one's close relations. Decades of research have shown the importance of primary relationships in both psychological and physiological well being. Yet an analysis of the broader social landscape suggests that consequential strangers provide many of the same benefits as intimates as well as many distinct and complementary functions. They are not universally beneficial—undesirable consequential strangers who cannot be avoided can be found in the workplace, neighborhoods and organizations. But to thrive in a modern society, research suggests, it is vital to have a variety of connections.

== History ==
The academic underpinnings of the concept can be traced back to Mark Granovetter's influential 1973 paper, "The Strength of Weak Ties," in which the sociologist argued that job opportunities were most likely to come from people in the more distant reaches of one's personal network—old bosses, former coworkers, college connections. Subsequent studies of social networks have shown that information, resources, and new connections—which confer social capital—are the province of weak ties in all arenas of life, not just employment. Benefits accrue to individuals, families, and the larger community as well. For example, one study found that African American mothers who made use of community ties as well as their families, were able to get their children into magnet schools and extracurricular programs that protected them from the dangers of inner city life.

Historically, relationship scholars have concentrated almost entirely on intimates: partners, children, parents, and, to a lesser extent, best friends. However, the trend toward urbanization underscored the importance of peripheral relationships. It is almost impossible to cope with the demands of modern life without weak ties. Thus, over the last several decades a handful of researchers and theorists have emphasized the important role of weak ties in anchoring individuals in the larger community. As one scholar observed in 1989, "Social scientists have long held that close and intimate friendships are the sine qua non of personal relationships, and no doubt they are important, but ties with acquaintances are equally important."

Technology has played a key role in the unprecedented rise of consequential strangers. Advances in transportation and communication have always altered the ways in which people can connect—the pony express allowed the printed word to spread; the telephone made it possible to speak to distant contacts. But computers and digitalization have accelerated the process. In 1997, when Merrill Lynch asked social observer Michael Schrage to analyze how "new" technologies would transform businesses, he stressed that the shift did not herald an "information revolution" as much as a "relationship revolution". His predictions proved prescient. Today, at least 1.6 billion people are connected via computer and mobile devices. Various social media, such as blogs, wikis, Twitter, SMS, and networking sites like Facebook facilitate contact, coordination, and collaboration across boundaries of time and space—and at minimal cost. Most relationships—personal and business—are now conducted both on and off the Internet. As a result, the ranks of consequential strangers have grown as has the ability to keep in touch with them.

== Definition ==
Consequential strangers comprise the aggregate of personal connections outside one's inner circles of family and close friends. Such relationship are referred to elsewhere as "peripheral" (versus "core"), "secondary" (versus "primary"), or "weak ties" (versus "strong"). Colloquially, they are also known as acquaintances. But in reality, relationships cannot be neatly classified into groups. Rather, they fall along a continuum. Consequential strangers occupy the vast territory between strangers and close (or core) ties. They are just beyond Stanley Milgram's conception of a familiar stranger—one frequently encountered and broadly identifiable (a woman, an Asian, a cop)—but not known in the personal sense. In contrast, a personal and repeated pattern of interaction is evident with a consequential stranger.

The field of consequential strangers encompasses a diverse assortment of relationship types. The gradations between weak ties are often blurred, among other reasons because all relationships are fluid and dynamic. Over time, some consequential stranger connections become close friends or even intimate partners, while others stay at the level of acquaintanceship—for example, those "anchored" to a particular place, such as a school, gym, or train station or involved in a paid service or status hierarchies (e.g., a boss and worker).

Also, the vocabulary of relationships can be confusing. Whereas some languages, such as French, have two forms of the pronoun "you"—using the informal tu with intimates and the formal vous with acquaintances—English has no such markers. The word "friend" is used to describe close and casual relations. One must inquire further to find out what the speaker means. Likewise, "acquaintance" can be defined either as a relationship that falls short of friendship or as a stage from which the relationship becomes more intimate. Technology further complicates the linguistic issue. For example, Japanese sociologist Hidenori Tomita coined the term "intimate stranger"—a person with whom one shares intimate and yet anonymous contact—to describe "new relationships born through the new media."

== From strangers to intimates: relationship development ==
Social scientists in the seventies observed that in order for a relationship to develop into increasing intimacy, the social partners need opportunities to get together, time with one another, and a certain degree of privacy (optimum group size for developing intimacy is small). More recent conceptualizations extend that premise, theorizing that a relationship is more than the sum of two people. Environmental, historical, and cultural factors also impinge on the course of a given relationship. Among factors cited are the partners' other social ties, their respective positions in the life cycle, the era in which the two are embedded, and the place—home, community, country—where their liaison unfolds. Moreover, "getting together" nowadays often occurs in virtual, not real, space.

The "closest" peripheral ties involve mutual recognition and repeated interactions (in one another's physical presence or online). A treasured accountant or a cherished priest might be among one's closest consequential strangers. At the other extreme are relationships that are barely blips on the social radar, such as people with adjoining season seats for a game or same-time-next-year conventioneers.

Another factor that shapes a relationship is the level of investment and stability. People are committed to their intimates, less so to their consequential strangers. If one's tennis partner moves or the owner of a favorite deli retires, such individuals might be missed, but others will fill their roles. Also, weak ties often serve compartmentalized needs—for a particular kind of assistance, a leisure activity, a work project—whereas intimates are more likely to serve multiple functions.

Self-disclosure—both breadth (the variety of subjects discussed) and depth (the degree of intimate sharing)—is the engine that drives all relationships. As a rule of thumb, the closer the relationship, the more time spent together, the more likely that social partners will self-disclose. However, in all relationships, social partners strike a balance between a need to connect and a need for one's own space. At different times of day, at different times of life, and at different points in history, people are more or less open to disclosing information about themselves. Even within a long-term relationship, partners do not always share with one another on a deep level. Thus, although lovers and best friends may be the likely recipients of confidences, they are rarely the only ones. Individuals also confide in their consequential strangers, particularly those near the intimate end of the continuum. Studies have shown, for example, that this happens frequently with certain professionals—among them, hairdressers and divorce lawyers. Likewise, gym buddies and frequent patrons at diners often share confidences with one another. In part it's the regularity of contact, in part the place itself. Under certain conditions, Zick Rubin found that people even share with complete strangers, a paradox known as the "stranger on a train" phenomenon.

== Benefits and drawbacks ==
Numerous studies underscore the importance of intimate relationships—and nothing in the conceptualization of consequential strangers disputes this. However, weak ties can be similar to, different from, and supportive of close relations. Indeed, consequential strangers can provide many of the same benefits to individuals as do close relationships: companionship, a sense of belonging, and emotional support, particularly in times of crisis or emergency.

Because relationships mirror different aspects of the self, both weak and strong ties contribute to an individual's sense of identity. In some situations, consequential strangers may allow distinct facets of identity to emerge. For example, women over fifty who join the Red Hat Society tend to express aspects of themselves in the company of other "Hatters" that would surprise members of their families.

Research also suggests that one can develop a greater sense of agency and mastery by stepping into multiple roles. Being with one's poker buddies requires a different skill set than volunteering at the local hospital or conducting a meeting at work. And because of the lack of familiarity in these various situations, it is necessary to communicate in more "elaborated" patterns of speech with consequential strangers than with loved ones. Relating to assorted others forces an individual to "negotiate, exercise judgment, reconcile, compromise, and take account of the intentions, purposes, motivations, and perspective" of his or her assorted role partners."

Weak ties also provide benefits not available in close ties: information, resources, and novelty, as well as a sense of being "known" in the larger community. Consequential strangers often act as "bridges" to new people and groups. Through them, an individual is exposed to ideas, cultures, life strategies, and diversions that are beyond the scope of their loved ones' knowledge and experience.

Casual connections provide fodder for social comparison—a psychological process in which one regards another's circumstances and feels better or worse off. In certain situations, downward comparison (feeling better than) may contribute to self-esteem. One study found that college students tend to view friends as comparable to themselves, but make downward comparisons with acquaintances. Viewing oneself as better than a close partner might jeopardize the relationships.

Consequential strangers can also support intimate ties, especially in the family. In a given day, parents deal with child care providers, teachers, coaches, and other parents who can offer tangible aid, such as car pools, information about school policies, as well as emotional support to the family.

Many peripheral relationships are satisfying, although some are also the cause of daily hassles. When a weak tie is bothersome, one can often walk away. However, there are certain consequential strangers from whom escape is impossible—a coworker, neighbor, or teacher that rankles.

Another study suggests that lying may be more frequent between consequential strangers than between intimates. Gossip, particularly among a closed system of colleagues or neighbors, spreads quickly among weak ties as well.

Aggression in the workplace—an arena filled mostly with consequential strangers rather than close friends—is also well documented. Researchers have even linked increases in blood pressure to the experience of working for an unfavorable supervisor. A vast literature regarding work and family further suggests that difficulties with co-workers can reverberate at home in the form of anger or withdrawal.

== The network view ==
Another way to view the impact of consequential strangers is by pulling the camera back from the individual to the entire network. Each individual travels through life in what was first conceptualized in the 1980s as a "social convoy"—an entourage of people that he or she has collected along the way. This assortment of personal ties is one type of social network.Some individuals are better or less equipped for life's challenges and crises, not merely because of their strength or socio-economic status, but also because of the composition of their convoys. Research indicates that the best convoys are composed of a combination of intimates and consequential strangers—people in the community, service providers, acquaintances one encounters in leisure and volunteer activities.

The perspective of the convoy enables a different view of one's life: "not as a string of events but as a cavalcade of people." Running into an old college roommate or a former employer allows an individual to revisit the past with the perspective of the present. Some close relations are part of the convoy from birth to death (parents, children), or for large portions of the journey (partners, close friends), while others (former roommates, exes) drop by the wayside. However, consequential strangers typically travel only part of the way, often for a specific function. For example, during a health crisis, medical personnel, members of support groups, and home aides might become part of an individual's convoy for a time.

The nature of a convoy can impact well being. Epidemiological research, which has focused on both strong and weak ties, suggests that social isolation bodes badly for psychological and physiological health. In contrast, "social integration"—having a personal network of intimates and consequential strangers—may increase longevity and resistance to disease. For example, an ongoing series of "viral challenge" studies have been conducted over the last twenty years, in which subjects are quarantined and deliberately infected with a virus. Those who had contact in the prior two weeks with six or more types of relationships (based on their responses to a checklist of 12 relationship types, both weak and strong) are four times less likely to come down with a cold than volunteers who had three or fewer types of connections.

A diverse social convoy is also more likely to deliver tangible and emotional support when needed. It is like having a personal "grapevine," be it at work or in the community, that allows one to keep current, to find the best service provider, and to gain access to different types of resources by being a "bridge" between different groups. One sociologist theorizes that knowing people in a wide range of professions, across all socio-economic levels, confers "cultural capital," enabling an individual to talk widely on many subjects. In this way, a diverse convoy is like a "liberal arts program, teaching a little of almost everything."

Similar benefits accrue to groups and institutions. The most innovative companies are those in which executives hire a diverse workforce and are open to input from all levels of employees, not just those at the top. They seek inspiration and encourage collaboration outside their own boundaries as well, in essence drawing from the widest possible range of consequential strangers. In a similar vein, marketing experts realize that tapping into broad social networks is an effective way to promote ideas and products. The success of social movements and political campaigns also depends on peripheral connections. For example, the youthful volunteers who participated in "Freedom Summer," a massive education and voter registration initiative in 1964, were drawn into the civil rights movement by people in the community, friends of friends, teachers and preachers—in short, their consequential strangers. More recently, Barack Obama's successful bid for the Presidency in 2008 exemplified a similar phenomenon, aided and accelerated by technology.
