= Immortalizer =

Studio album by Valient Thorr
- Released: June 17, 2008
- Genre: Heavy metal, hard rock
- Length: 47:50
- Label: Volcom Entertainment
- Producer: Jack Endino

Valient Thorr chronology
Legend of the World (2006)	Immortalizer (2008)	Stranger (2010)

Professional ratings
Review scores
Source	Rating
AbsolutePunk.net	73%
AllMusic	4.5/5 stars

Immortalizer is the fourth studio album by the American rock band Valient Thorr, released in 2008.

== Track listing ==
1. "I Hope the Ghosts of the Dead Haunt Yr Soul Forever" – 3:21
2. "Infinite Lives" – 3:20
3. "Mask of Sanity" – 4:19
4. "Tomorrow Police" – 4:26
5. "No Holds Barred" 3:41
6. "Parable of Daedalus" – 4:18
7. "Birdhead Looking at Goldenhands" – 3:15
8. "Vernal Equinox" – 1:18
9. "1000 Winters in a Row" – 4:36
10. "Red Flag" – 2:58
11. "Nomadic Sacrifice" – 4:07
12. "Steeplechase" – 3:15
13. "Tackle the Walrus" – 4:18
14. "Untitled" – 0:36
