= Legend of the World =

Studio album by Valient Thorr
- Released: July 11, 2006
- Genre: Heavy metal, hard rock
- Length: 48:24
- Label: Volcom Entertainment
- Producer: Fred Archambault

Valient Thorr chronology
Total Universe Man (2005)	Legend of the World (2006)	Immortalizer (2008)

Legend of the World is the third studio album by the American rock band Valient Thorr, released in 2006.

== Track listing ==
1. "Heatseeker" - 4:06
2. "Rezerection" - 4:24
3. "Exit Strategy" - 3:56
4. "Lime Green Net" - 4:20
5. "Stormstris" - 3:26
6. "Goveruptcy" - 3:18
7. "False Profits" - 3:40
8. "Triceratops" - 2:47
9. "Fall of Pangea" - 7:01
10. "Problem Solver" - 3:20
11. "Con Science" - 3:20
12. "Har Megiddo" - 4:53
13. "Yusuf Abdelaziz" - 4:53

== Reception ==
Professional ratings
Review scores
Source	Rating
AllMusic	3.5/5 stars

Legend of the World received mostly positive reviews.

== In popular culture ==
- The song "Fall of Pangea" is available as a bonus track in the music video game Guitar Hero II.
- The song "Heatseeker" is used as a song track in the racing video game Need for Speed: Carbon.
