= Valient Thorr =

American rock band

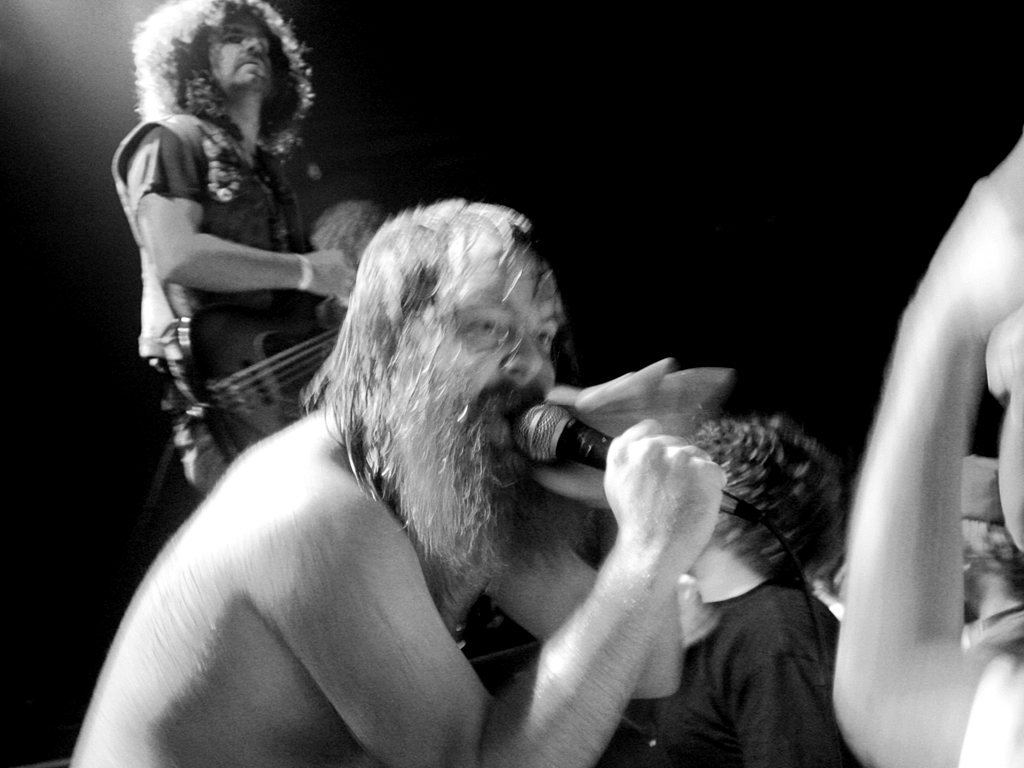
- Valient Thorr performing in 2006

Background information
- Origin: Greenville, North Carolina, U.S.
- Genres: Heavy metal; hard rock; southern metal
- Years active: 2001–present
- Label: Volcom
- Members: Valient Himself; Eidan Thorr; Storm Thorr; Deimos Thorr; Iggy Thorr
- Past members: Donn Thorr; Jin Thorr; Bjorn Thorr; Odinn Thorr; Voiden Thorr; Dr. Professor Nitewolf Strangees; Lucien Thorr; Sadat Thorr
- Website: valientthorr.com

Valient Thorr is an American hard rock/heavy metal band from Greenville, North Carolina. The name of the band is based on the urban legend of Valiant Thor, an Alien which came from Venus to Earth. Valient explained, "That'll be the background for the band! We're from space ..."

== History ==
Valient Thorr began playing together in 2000. Their first show was on Easter of 2001. They released two demos, "Raw" and "We Come From The Morning Star". Following the demos, Valient Thorr self-released their first album on July 1, 2003 (only pressing 1000 copies which were sold at shows), Stranded on Earth, which had the same musical setup as present, but one of the guitarist, Jin Thorr, used a keyboard, 'ic. They packed hometown shows all over North Carolina and at their local favorite venue Kings Barcade. They did their first major tour of the United States and Canada shortly afterward, doing 47 shows in 52 days.

After replacing original drummer Donn Thorr with current drummer Lucian Thorr and ditching the keyboard entirely live and on release, they were soon signed to Volcom Entertainment, where their full-length album Total Universe Man was released on June 7, 2005. At that point, upon completion of several master's degrees, the group members gave up their regular jobs and set out on the road. They performed on the Volcom stage on the Warped Tour 2005, for the entire tour, except for a few shows where they played the main stage. They continued touring, taking only six days off for Thanksgiving and ten for Christmas. Along the way, they lost their original rhythm guitarist, Jjinn Thorr, and replaced him with Bjorn Thorr to finish off the end of the year. They played in Hawaii with Andrew WK and then began 2006 by going on tour with Hot Rod Circuit and Piebald. After his departure, Eiden Thorr took Jjinn's old position at shows, moving from Stage Right (the position he held since the band's inception) to Stage Left.

In February 2006, they stopped briefly in Costa Mesa, California, to write the follow-up to Total Universe Man.

After Bjorn Thorr's brief stint, guitarist Odinn Thorr was asked to join the band. On July 11, 2006, they released their follow-up album, Legend of the World. They toured the entire Warped Tour again for the summer of 2006 playing the Volcom Stage, with the exception of a few main stage slots, including the hometown stop in Raleigh, where they closed out the night after NOFX and AFI on one of the two mainstages to a packed crowd. They continued to tour throughout 2006, including a tour with Joan Jett and the Black Hearts, Eagles of Death Metal, and ending the year touring with Gogol Bordello. Valient Thorr played 272 shows in 2006. Taking no time off for Thanksgiving in 2006, and only two days for Christmas, they drove back to California to play New Year's Eve at the Viper Room in Hollywood. In January 2007 Odinn Thorr was replaced by Voiden Thorr (guitarist for Texas metal duo Golden Axe). Valient Thorr continued to tour right through 2007, beginning with a four-month tour with Fu Manchu. They did two months in the US, and then traveled overseas for the first time, playing Europe, the UK, and Scandinavia. They returned home, and co-headlined the very first Volcom Tour with labelmates the Riverboat Gamblers. They ended the year by returning to Germany to tour with Motörhead for three weeks, and then returned home without a day off to do three weeks with the Sword. Valient Thorr wrote the follow-up to "Legend of the World" in Costa Mesa, which was produced by Jack Endino and recorded by him in Seattle. It was named "Immortalizer", and was Valient Thorr's fourth album in five years. It was released on June 17, 2008.

The song "Fall of Pangea" is an unlockable song in the video game Guitar Hero II. "Heatseeker" was featured in Rob Dyrdek's Fantasy Factory and is used as a song track in the racing video game Need for Speed: Carbon. The song "Man Behind the Curtain" appeared in Skate. The song "Double Crossed" was used as a radio track in the video game The Crew.

In late May 2008, Valient Himself donated his kidney to his diabetic father. Three weeks after recovering from the surgery Valient Himself and the band returned to Europe and played their biggest shows, including the Download Festival in Donington and Graspop in June 2008. They continued to tour Europe that summer and returned home to tour with Early Man, Monotonix, and Skeletonwitch and then again in the fall with Motorhead, the Misfits, Year Long Disaster, and ASG on the Volcom Tour 2008.

On November 11, 2008, Valient Thorr released In Heat, a feature-length documentary about the last five years on the road. They also played ECFU Turbojugend Fest in Atlanta on Halloween 2008, The Fest in Gainesville, Florida, in November, and toured Hawaii in December. On January 30, 2009, they did a set for a local charity playing as Funkadelic in Raleigh, North Carolina. On February 5 they played in East River Park with Anthrax for Red Bull's Snowscraper Event. On March 7, they played the Harvest of Hope Fest in St. Augustine, Florida, and toured the US out to SXSW 2009. In June 2009, they went back to Europe, touring with Mastodon in the UK and Paris and headlining all over western Europe. At this time, guitarist Voiden Thorr left the group being replaced by Sadat Thorr (James Yopp), former guitarist/founding member of another North Carolina–based rock band Thunderlip. In the fall, Thorr toured the US again with Early Man and Red Fang. In November and December, they went back to Europe again to play in Scandinavia and eastern Europe.

In January 2010, Valient Thorr announced they would record their fifth album with Jack Endino. In February 2010, they began recording and it was announced that Valient Thorr would be supporting Mastodon on their US headlining tour throughout March and into April. September 2010, they released "Stranger" and continued with a slew of headlining tours to promote the record.

In early 2011, Valient Thorr and Clutch were announced as the supporting acts for Motörhead's 2011 North American tour in support of The Wörld Is Yours.

In January 2013 they entered the studio with producer Kyle Spense of Harvey milk to record their sixth record Our Own Masters. It was released in June of that year.

== Members ==
- Herbie "VALIENT HIMSELF" Abernethy – vocals (2000–present)
- Bennie "EIDAN THORR" Powell – guitars (2001–present)
- Tyler "DR. PROFESSOR NITEWOLF STRANGEES" Wolf – bass (2000–2014, 2018–present)
- Pete "DEIMOS THORR" Macy – guitars (2015–present)
- Chris "IGGY THORR" Sample – drums (2015–present)
- Jason "LUCIAN THORR" Aylward – drums (2003–2015, 2018–present)

=== Inactive members ===
- James "SADAT THORR" Yopp
- Jeff "DONN THORR" Haswell
- Ryan "JJINN THORR" Price
- Brandon "BJORN THORR" Hoy
- Mark "ODINN THORR" Maxwell
- Storm "STORM THORR" Castaneda
- Warren "VOIDEN THORR" Hatfield

== Discography ==
| Title | Release date | Label |
|---|---|---|
| Stranded on Earth | July 1, 2003 | Self-released |
| Total Universe Man | June 7, 2005 | Volcom Entertainment |
| Legend of the World | July 11, 2006 | Volcom Entertainment |
| Immortalizer | June 17, 2008 | Volcom Entertainment |
| In Heat (DVD) | November 4, 2008 | Volcom Entertainment |
| Stranger | September 14, 2010 | Volcom Entertainment |
| Beast with a Billion Eyes | February 27, 2012 | Volcom Entertainment |
| Our Own Masters | June 18, 2013 | Volcom Entertainment |
| Old Salt | July 29, 2016 | Napalm Records |

== Television appearances ==
- Fuse TV, Warped Tour special (behind the scenes)
- G4 TV, Attack of the Show! (performance)
- Warped: Inside and Out (six episode show on Fuse) – four episodes (performance, and behind the scenes, narration)
- Game Head, episode from The Warped Tour
- Daily Habit, episode on Fuel TV
- Fuel TV, episode of Check 1,2
