= The Stranger (Camus novel) =

1942 French novella by Albert Camus

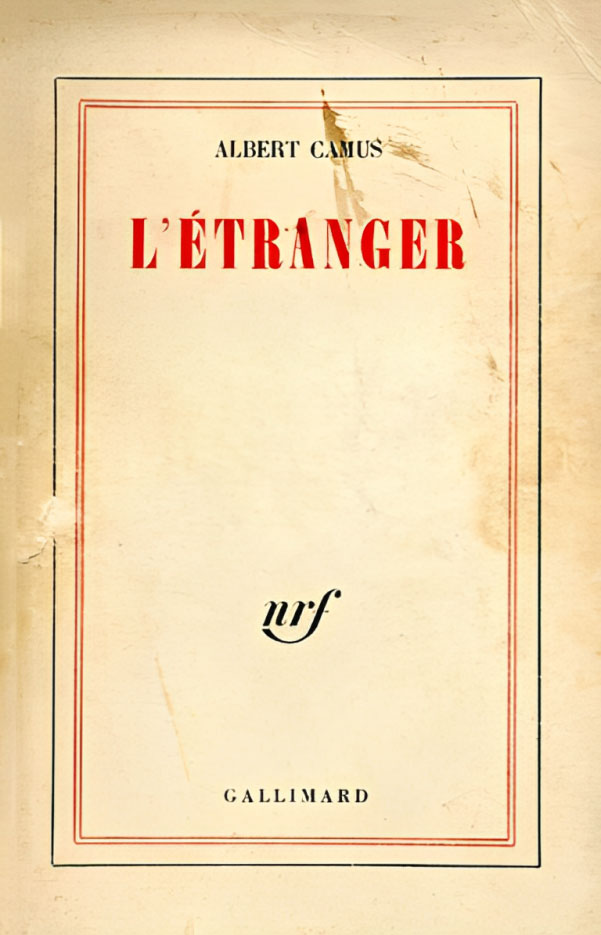
- Cover of the first edition (Collection Blanche)
- Author: Albert Camus
- Original title: L'Étranger
- Translator: Stuart Gilbert (1946); Matthew Ward (1989)
- Language: French
- Genre: Philosophical novel
- Set in: Algeria
- Publisher: Gallimard
- Publication date: 19 May 1942
- Publication place: France
- Media type: Print (paperback)
- Pages: 159

The Stranger (French: L'Étranger [letʁɑ̃ʒe], lit. 'The Foreigner'), also published in English as The Outsider, is a 1942 novella written by French author Albert Camus. The first of Camus's novels to be published, the story follows Meursault, an indifferent man in French Algeria, who, weeks after his mother's funeral, kills an unnamed Arab man in Algiers. The story is divided into two parts, presenting Meursault's first-person narrative before and after the killing.

Camus completed the initial manuscript by May 1941, with revisions suggested by André Malraux, Jean Paulhan, and Raymond Queneau that were adopted in the final version. The original French-language first edition of the novella was published on 19 May 1942, by Gallimard, under its original title; it appeared in bookstores from that June but was restricted to an initial 4,400 copies, so few that it could not be a bestseller. Even though it was published during the Nazi occupation of France, it went on sale without censorship or omission by the Propaganda-Staffel.

It began being published in English from 1946, first in the United Kingdom, where its title was changed to The Outsider to avoid confusion with the translation of Maria Kuncewiczowa's novel Cudzoziemka; after being published in the United States, the novella retained its original name, and the British-American difference in titles has persisted in subsequent editions. The Stranger gained popularity among anti-Nazi circles following its focus in Jean-Paul Sartre's 1947 article "Explication de L'Étranger" ('Analysis of The Stranger').

Considered a classic of 20th-century literature, The Stranger has received critical acclaim for Camus's philosophical outlook, absurdism, syntactic structure, and existentialism (despite Camus's rejection of the label), particularly within its final chapter. Le Monde ranked The Stranger as number one on its 100 Books of the 20th Century. In Le Temps, it was voted the third best book written in French in the 20th and 21st century by a jury of 50 literary connoisseurs.

The novella has been adapted for film three times: Lo Straniero (1967), Yazgı (2001), and L'Étranger (2025), has seen numerous references and homages in television and music (notably "Killing an Arab" by The Cure), and was retold from the perspective of the unnamed Arab man's brother in Kamel Daoud's 2013 novel The Meursault Investigation.

== Plot ==
=== Part 1 ===
Meursault learns of the death of his mother, who has been living in an old age home in the country. He takes time off from work to attend her funeral but seems to show no signs of grief or mourning to the people around him. When asked if he wishes to view her body, he declines, and he smokes and drinks regular (white) coffee—not the obligatory black coffee—at the vigil held by the coffin the night before the burial with the caretaker.

The day after the funeral Meursault returns to Algiers and encounters Marie, a former secretary of his firm. The two become re-acquainted, swim together, and that evening watch a Fernandel film and begin to have an intimate relationship.

Over the next few days, Meursault helps Raymond Sintès—a neighbor and friend who is rumored to be a pimp, but says he works in a warehouse—to get revenge on an Arab mistress who, Raymond suspects, has been accepting gifts and money from another man. Raymond asks Meursault to write a letter inviting the woman over to Raymond's apartment solely so that he can have sex with her and then spit in her face and throw her out. While listening to Raymond, Meursault is unfazed by any feelings of empathy, does not express concern that she would be emotionally hurt by this plan and agrees to write the letter.

The mistress visits Raymond on a Sunday morning, and the police get involved when he beats her for slapping him after he tries to kick her out. He asks Meursault to testify that the woman had been unfaithful when he is called to the police station, and Meursault agrees. Ultimately, Raymond is let off with a warning.

While this is going on, Meursault's boss asks him if he would like to work at a branch their firm is thinking about opening in Paris and Marie asks him if he wants to get married. In both cases, Meursault does not have strong feelings about the matter but is willing to move or get married if it will please the other party. Also, Salamano, Meursault's and Raymond's elderly neighbor, loses his abused and diseased dog and, despite outwardly maintaining his usual spiteful and uncaring attitude toward the creature, goes to Meursault for comfort and advice a few times. During one of these conversations, Salamano, who adopted the dog as a companion shortly after his wife's death, mentions that some neighbors had 'said nasty things' about Meursault after he sent his mother to a retirement home. Meursault is surprised to learn about this negative impression of his actions.

One weekend, Raymond invites Meursault and Marie to a friend's beach cabin. There they see the brother of Raymond's spurned mistress along with another Arab, who Raymond has mentioned have been following him around recently. The Arabs confront Raymond and Meursault, and the brother wounds Raymond with a knife before running away. Later, Meursault walks back along the beach alone, armed with a revolver he took from Raymond to prevent him from acting rashly, and encounters the brother of Raymond's mistress. Disoriented and on the edge of heatstroke, Meursault shoots when the Arab flashes his knife at him. It is a fatal shot, but Meursault shoots the man four more times after a pause.

=== Part 2 ===
Meursault is incarcerated. His general detachment and ability to adapt to any external circumstance seem to make living in prison tolerable, especially after he gets used to the idea of being restricted and unable to have sex with Marie, though he does realize at one point that he has been unknowingly talking to himself for a number of days. For almost a year, he sleeps, looks out the small window of his cell, and mentally lists the objects in his old apartment while waiting for his day in court.

Meursault never denies the murder he committed, so, at his trial, the prosecuting attorney focuses more on his inability or unwillingness to cry at his mother's funeral than on the details of the murder. He portrays Meursault's quietness and passivity as demonstrating his criminality and lack of remorse and denounces Meursault as a soulless monster who deserves to die for his crime. Although several of Meursault's friends testify on his behalf and his attorney tells him the sentence will likely be light, Meursault is sentenced to be publicly decapitated.

Put in a new cell, Meursault obsesses over his impending doom and appeal and tries to imagine some way in which he can escape his fate. He refuses to see the prison chaplain, but one day the chaplain visits him anyway. Meursault says he does not believe in God and is not even interested in the subject, but the chaplain persists in trying to lead Meursault away from atheism (or, perhaps more precisely, apatheism). The chaplain believes Meursault's appeal will succeed in getting him released from prison, but says such an outcome will not rid him of his feelings of guilt or fix his relationship with a God he doesn't believe in. Eventually, Meursault accosts the chaplain in a rage. He attacks the chaplain's worldview and patronizing attitude and asserts that, in confronting the certainty of the nearness of his death, he has had insights about life and death that he is confident are beyond those the chaplain possesses. He says that, although what we say or do or feel can cause our deaths to happen at different times or under different circumstances, none of those things can change the fact that we are all condemned to die one day, so nothing ultimately matters.

After the chaplain leaves, Meursault finds some comfort in thinking about the parallels between his situation and how he thinks his mother must have felt when she was surrounded by death and slowly dying at the retirement home. Yelling at the chaplain had emptied him of all hope or thoughts of escape or a successful appeal, so he manages to open his heart 'to the benign indifference of the universe' and decides that he has been, and still is, happy. His indifference to the universe makes him feel as if he belongs to it. He even hopes there will be a large, hateful crowd at his execution, which will bring everything to a consummate end.

== Characters ==
- Meursault (pronounced [møʁ.so]) is a French settler in Algeria who learns of his mother's death by telegram. Meursault's indifference to his mother's death demonstrates some emotional detachment from his environment. Other instances are shown. Meursault is also a truthful person, speaking his mind without regard for others. He is estranged from society due to his indifference but shows some affection towards Marie.
- Meursault's mother was sent to an old people's home three years prior to her death, as noted in the opening lines of the novel. As Meursault nears the time for his execution, he feels a kinship with his mother, thinking she, too, embraced a meaningless universe.
- Thomas Pérez was close to Meursault's mother while she was in the home; prompting other residents to jokingly refer to him as her "fiancé". He brings up the rear in the funeral procession for Meursault's mother, and Meursault describes in a great amount of detail the old man's struggle to keep up. He is called to testify at Meursault's trial.
- Céleste is the owner of a café that Meursault frequents. He testifies at Meursault's trial.
- Marie Cardona was a typist in the same workplace as Meursault. A day after his mother's funeral, she meets Meursault at a public pool, and they begin a relationship. She asks Meursault on one occasion if he loves her, and on another if he would like to marry her. To the first he responds with no, the second he seems indifferent to the idea. Marie visits him once in prison, but is not permitted any further visits since she is not his wife. She testifies at Meursault's trial.
- Salamano is an old man who routinely walks his dog. He abuses it but is still attached to it. When he loses his dog, he is distressed and asks Meursault for advice. He testifies at Meursault's trial.
- Raymond Sintès is a neighbour of Meursault who beats his Arab mistress. Her brother and friends try to take revenge. He brings Meursault into the conflict, and the latter kills the brother. Raymond and Meursault seem to develop a bond, and he testifies for Meursault during his trial.
- Masson is the owner of the beach house where Raymond takes Marie and Meursault. Masson is a carefree person who likes to live his life and be happy. He testifies at Meursault's trial.
- The Arabs include Raymond's mistress, her brother, and his assumed friends. None of the Arabs in The Stranger are named, reflecting the distance between the French colonists and native people.
- The Arab (the brother of the mistress of Raymond) is a man shot and killed by Meursault on a beach in Algiers.
- The Chaplain serves as a final attempt to force Meursault into following normative social scripts, in this case, seeking Christian forgiveness for his crime. The overall weakness of the Chaplain's arguments in the face of Meursault's complete disinterest in them emphasizes the novel's view of religion as a limiting worldview that distracts from the truth of life's ultimate absurdity.

== Critical analysis ==
In his 1956 analysis of the novel, Carl Viggiani wrote:

On the surface, L'Étranger gives the appearance of being an extremely simple though carefully planned and written book. In reality, it is a dense and rich creation, full of undiscovered meanings and formal qualities. It would take a book at least the length of the novel to make a complete analysis of meaning and form and the correspondences of meaning and form, in L'Étranger.

Victor Brombert has analysed L'Étranger and Sartre's "Explication de L'Étranger" in the philosophical context of the Absurd. Louis Hudon dismissed the characterisation of L'Étranger as an existentialist novel in his 1960 analysis. The 1963 study by Ignace Feuerlicht begins with an examination of the themes of alienation, in the sense of Meursault being a 'stranger' in his society. In his 1970 analysis, Leo Bersani commented that L'Étranger is "mediocre" in its attempt to be a "'profound' novel", but describes the novel as an "impressive if flawed exercise in a kind of writing promoted by the New Novelists of the 1950s". Paul P. Somers Jr. has compared Camus's L'Étranger and Sartre's Nausea, in light of Sartre's essay on Camus's novel. Sergei Hackel has explored parallels between L'Étranger and Dostoyevsky's Crime and Punishment. Meursault's intransigent behaviour in jail recalls that of Julien Sorel in Stendhal's Le Rouge et Le Noir (The Red and the Black).

Terry Otten has studied in detail the relationship between Meursault and his mother. Gerald Morreale examines Meursault's killing of the Arab and the question of whether Meursault's action is an act of murder. Ernest Simon has examined the nature of Meursault's trial in L'Étranger, with respect to earlier analysis by Richard Weisberg and jurist Richard A. Posner. René Girard has critiqued the relative nature of 'indifference' in the character of Meursault in relation to his surrounding society.

Kamel Daoud has written a novel The Meursault Investigation (2013/2014), first published in Algeria in 2013, and then republished in France to critical acclaim. This post-colonialist response to The Stranger counters Camus's version with elements from the perspective of the unnamed Arab victim's brother (naming him and presenting him as a real person who was mourned) and other protagonists. Daoud explores their subsequent lives following the withdrawal of French authorities and most pied-noirs from Algeria after the conclusion of the Algerian War of Independence in 1962.

=== As a depiction of autism ===
Some have noted that the actions and beliefs of the main character could be explained by autism. Meursault displays difficulties in communicating with others, sensory issues, difficulties in displaying emotions and difficulties in understanding the emotions of others. Although there was very limited knowledge of autism at the time, Camus based the main character on the behavior and attitude of a close friend, Pierre Galindo, who could be described as autistic. Thus it is possible that Camus unwittingly created the first description of autism in literature, and the actions and beliefs of the character should be re-examined.

== Publication history and English translations ==
=== Original French publication ===
On 27 May 1941, Camus was informed about the changes suggested by André Malraux after he had read the manuscript and took his remarks into account. For instance, Malraux thought that the minimalist syntactic structure was too repetitive, and that some scenes and passages (the murder, the conversation with the chaplain) should also be revised. The manuscript was then read by editors Jean Paulhan and Raymond Queneau. Gerhard Heller, a German editor, translator and lieutenant in the Wehrmacht working for the Censorship Bureau offered to help.

The original French-language novel was published in Paris on 19 May 1942 by Gallimard as L'Étranger. The book started appearing in bookstores in June 1942, at a price of 25 francs. Only 4,400 copies of it were printed. As a marketing ploy, the title pages and rear wrappers were inscribed to give the false impression that there were eight different editions. At the time, Camus was suffering from a recurring bout of tuberculosis in Oran and could not travel to France and therefore could not keep with the French publishing tradition of presenting copies of his new book to journalists. He was also unable to read the first reviews published in newspapers or witness the distribution in bookstores. Upon publication, twenty copies were sent to him, but they never arrived and it was not until 17 June that Camus finally received a single copy. Camus was further diagnosed with tuberculosis in both lungs in July 1942 and left Algeria for Panelier, a village near Le Chambon-sur-Lignon in the mountains of south-central France.

=== English translations ===
In 1946, the first English translation, by British author Stuart Gilbert, was published, based on the first French edition. For more than 30 years, Gilbert's version was the standard, and only mainstream, English translation. Gilbert's choice of title, The Stranger, was changed by publisher Hamish Hamilton to The Outsider, because it considered it "more striking and appropriate" and because Maria Kuncewiczowa's Polish-language novel Cudzoziemka had recently been published in London as The Stranger. In the United States, Knopf had already typeset the manuscript using Gilbert's original title when informed of the name change and so disregarded it; the British–American difference in titles has persisted in subsequent editions. Several scholars, including Helen Sebba, John E. Gale, and Eric Du Plessis, along with commentators such as James Campbell, have noted inaccuracies in the Stuart Gilbert translation and their resulting distortions of the tone of Camus' original French text in his English translation.

In 1982, the British publisher Hamish Hamilton, which had issued Gilbert's translation, published a translation by Joseph Laredo, also as The Outsider. Penguin Books bought this version in 1983 for a paperback edition.

In 1982, the American publisher University Press of America published a translation by Kate Griffith, titled The Stranger.

In 1988, Vintage published a version in the United States with a translation by American Matthew Ward under the standard American title of The Stranger. Camus was influenced by American literary style, and Ward's translation expresses American usage and adheres more closely to Camus' original prose and tone.

In 2012, a translation by Sandra Smith was published by Penguin as The Outsider.

==== Difference between translations ====
A critical difference among these translations is the expression of emotion in the sentence clause towards the close of the novel: "I laid my heart open to the benign indifference of the universe" in Gilbert's translation, versus Laredo's "I laid my heart open to the gentle indifference of the universe" (original French: la tendre indifférence du monde; literally, "the tender indifference of the world"). The Penguin Classics 2000 reprint of Laredo's translation has "gentle" changed to "benign". Smith's 2012 translation uses the literal translation, "tender", stating in her Translator's Note that using "benign" "fails to capture the paradoxical nuance of 'tender'". (In the original it is: "je m’ouvrais pour la première fois à la tendre indifférence du monde".)

The ending lines differ as well: Gilbert translates 'on the day of my execution there should be a huge crowd of spectators and that they should greet me with howls of execration', which contrasts with Laredo's and Smith's translation of 'greet me with cries of hatred'. This passage describes a scene that would serve as a foil to the prior 'indifference of the world'. In French, the phrase is cris de haine. Ward translates this as 'with cries of hate'. Gilbert juxtaposes 'execration' with 'execution'. (In the original it is: "Pour que tout soit consommé, pour que je me sente moins seul, il me restait à souhaiter qu’il y ait beaucoup de spectateurs le jour de mon exécution et qu’ils m’accueillent avec des cris de haine.")

Aujourd'hui, Maman est morte is the opening sentence of the novel. English translations have rendered the first sentence as 'Mother died today', 'Maman died today', or a variant thereof. In 2012, Ryan Bloom argued that it should be translated as 'Today, Maman died'. He believes this better expresses the character of Meursault, as developed in the novel, as someone who 'lives for the moment', 'does not consciously dwell on the past', and 'does not worry about the future'.

==== List of English translations ====
- 1946, The Outsider (translated by Stuart Gilbert), London: Hamish Hamilton
- 1946, The Stranger (translated by Stuart Gilbert), New York: Alfred A. Knopf
- 1982, The Outsider (translated by Joseph Laredo), London: Hamish Hamilton, ISBN 978-0-14-118250-6
- 1982, The Stranger (translated by Kate Griffith), Washington, D.C.: University Press of America, ISBN 081912141X, ISBN 0819121428
- 1988, The Stranger (translated by Matthew Ward), New York: Alfred A. Knopf, ISBN 0-394-53305-4.
  - Reissued in 1989 by Vintage New York: Vintage, ISBN 978-0-679-72020-1.
- 2012, The Outsider (translated by Sandra Smith), London: Penguin, ISBN 978-0-14-138958-5

== In popular culture ==
=== Film ===
- 1967 Lo Straniero (The Stranger) by Luchino Visconti (Italian)
- 2001 Yazgı (Fate) by Zeki Demirkubuz (Turkish)
- 2025 L'Étranger (The Stranger) by François Ozon (French)

=== Literature ===
- The Meursault Investigation (2015) by Kamel Daoud is a novel created counter to Camus's version, from the perspective of an Arab man described as the brother of the murdered man. Referred to only as "The Arab" by Camus, in this novel he is said to have been named Musa, and was an actual man who existed and was mourned by his brother and mother. It was a New York Times Notable Book of 2015.

=== In song ===
- "Killing an Arab", the 1978 debut single by the Cure, was described by Robert Smith as "a short poetic attempt at condensing my impression of the key moments in 'l'entranger' [sic] (The Outsider) by Albert Camus".
- Canadian punk rock band L'Étranger was named after the novella, formed by NDP politicians & musicians Charlie Angus and Andrew Cash.
- "Noch koroche dnya", from the 1995 album of the same name by the Russian heavy metal band Aria, is based on Meursault's encounter with the chaplain in the final scene of the novel. It is narrated from Meursault's first-person perspective and includes (in Russian) the line, "The cries of hate will be my reward / Upon my death, I will not be alone".
- At the end of "Asa Phelps Is Dead", from the album Ghost Stories by The Lawrence Arms, the passage in which Meursault accepts his impending execution is read by Chris McCaughan. It parallels certain themes in the song's lyrics.
- Folk singer-songwriter Eric Andersen has a song called "The Stranger (Song of Revenge)", one of four songs based on Camus's works on his 2014 EP The Shadow and Light of Albert Camus.
- Tuxedomoon's third single was titled "The Stranger" and was reworked in 1981 as "L'étranger (Gigue existentielle)" for the Suite en sous-sol EP. The lyrics to both versions include direct references to the protagonist's mother's death and the expectation that he will cry at her funeral.
- Avenged Sevenfold's first single "Nobody" from Life Is But a Dream... was inspired by The Stranger.
- During the first verse of "Versailles", from the album Aethiopes by Billy Woods, Woods directly references the killing in the book with the line, "It's hot on these streets monsieur, I might shoot a arab".
- The Turkish rock song titled "Yabancı" (The Stranger) written and composed by Ata Akdağ and performed by Feridun Düzağaç feat Yaya, is dedicated to Camus' novel of the same name. Some of the lyrics in the song are: "The days do not progress, they have lost their names, It's all the same / I knocked on the door of disaster / I am a stranger who kills for someone else." The song is included in the album "10'a Özel", released in 2019.
- The sixth song on J. A. Seazer's album バルバラ矮星子黙示録 (Barbara Dwarf Star Child Apocalypse) features the song 異邦人の揺籠歌 (エトランジェのララバイ), which can be translated to "L'Etranger's Lullabye".
- The third single released by jHYDE, "L'ÉTRANGER" is inspired by the book. It also contains direct passages from an English translation.
- European DJ artist and owner of Stroboscipic Artefacts record label "Lucy" (Luca Mortellaro) released March 15th, 2019 titled track "Dyscamupia". The 12 minute and 41 second track's lyrics is a quoted and spoken excerpt from The Stranger following Meursault before, during, and after the killing of the unnamed Arab on the beach.

=== Games ===
- Meursault, based on the main character of the same name, features in the 2023 game Limbus Company by the Korean game studio Project Moon. The game portrays him slightly differently but still attaches themes of absurdism to his character.
- Mistral, a French-Algerian woman from Metal Gear Rising: Revengeance who uses a polearm called L'Etranger in battle. The game's writing staff confirmed in an interview published in the game's official guide that they based Mistral's ethnicity, weapon name and backstory on the novel.
- L'Étranger, referencing the novel of the same name, is an unlockable revolver and secondary weapon for The Spy from the 2007 game Team Fortress 2. It was added as part of the Mann-conomy update.

=== Comics ===
Jacques Ferrandez made the 2013 comic-book adaptation The Stranger for the 100th anniversary of Camus' birth.

== See also ==
- Absurdism
- Character evidence
- Existentialism
- La Veuve Couderc
- Le Monde's 100 Books of the Century
