= Matthew Ward (writer) =

American translator (died 1990)

Matthew Ward (1950/1951 – June 23, 1990) was an American English/French translator noted for his 1989 rendition of Albert Camus' The Stranger. He made several important alterations from the more British-toned translation by Stuart Gilbert. Most notably he altered the quite well known opening line "Mother died today" to "Maman died today". Ward defended the alteration by noting that the more juvenile "Maman" reflects the "curious feeling he (Meursault) has for her". Other examples of Ward altering Gilbert's version include the line, "Il était avec son chien" from, "As usual, he had his dog with him" to "He was with his dog". Once again Ward felt this better reflected Meursault's character. Indeed, later in the novel Meursault notes Salamano's dog is worth no more or less than his wife.

Other authors he has translated include Roland Barthes, Colette, Pablo Picasso and Jean-Paul Sartre. He also wrote literary criticism and poetry. Ward died of AIDS in 1990 at the age of 39.

He received the PEN Translation Prize in 1989.
