= Karen L. Fingerman =

Gerontologist, Psychologist

Karen L. Fingerman, Ph.D., is the Sonia Wilson Professor of Health and Human Sciences and a professor in the Department of Human Development and Family Sciences at the University of Texas at Austin. She also serves as the Founding Director of the Texas Institute on Dementia, Aging and Longevity, formerly the Texas Aging & Longevity Consortium, in tandem with her role as Co-Director at the National Institute on Aging-funded Texas Center on Aging and Population Sciences.

Fingerman has published over 200 works regarding socioemotional development across adulthood focusing on parents and children, in-law ties, romantic partners, grandparents and grandchildren, friends, and peripheral social ties. Fingerman is well known for her work on older adult socio-emotional processes, health, and well-being. Notably, Fingerman generated the Social Input Model and coined the terms “consequential strangers” and "fringeships".

== Education ==
Dr. Fingerman received her B.A. from Harvard/Radcliffe University, a Master’s Degree and Ph.D. in psychology from the University of Michigan, Ann Arbor., and complete a post-doctoral fellowship at fellowship at the Stanford University School of Medicine.

== Psychology Today blog ==
Recently, Dr. Fingerman started writing a blog for Psychology Today, titled The Bonds Across the Lifespan, in which she aims to increase health literacy as it relates to aging and dementia. Notable topics discussed include:

- Online health advice
- Caring for aging parents
- Frontotemporal dementia (FTD)
- Lewy body dementia (LBD)
- Reducing the risk of developing dementia
- The causes of Alzheimer's disease
- Cognitive reserve
- Social connection and cognitive functioning
- Normal aging vs dementia
- Fringeships
- Digital technology use among older adults

== Research contributions ==
Dr. Fingerman studies adult development and aging, in particular social and emotional aspects of aging and assessments in daily life. Dr. Fingerman has conducted research and published widely regarding parents and children, in-law ties, romantic partners, grandparents and grandchildren, friends, and peripheral social ties.

=== Caregiving ===
==== Lewy body dementia ====
Her recent research has focused on the role family caregivers play. She is currently working on an NIA-funded study of caregivers for older adults experiencing Lewy body dementia (LBD). LBD is the second most common form of neurodegenerative dementia, but has received little research attention compared to Alzheimer's disease. Caregiving in this context is extremely challenging. This study used ecological momentary assessments (EMAs), Electronically Activated Recorders (EAR), and Fitbits to examine the daily fluctuations of caregiving experiences and LBD symptoms.

==== Young adult caregivers ====
She has also conducted research on the experiences of young adult caregivers for aging family members, with her paper in Innovations in Aging receiving commendation for being among the most cited papers.

=== Adult well-being and relationships ===
Dr. Fingerman has made important contributions to understanding social and emotional processes across adulthood, and the impact of these processes on health and well-being. As principal investigator of the Daily Experiences and Well-being Study, she has examined how older adults' social engagement, is associated with daily emotional, cognitive, and physical activity. This study relied on ecologically valid methodologies as older adults go about their days including EMAs, Actical measurements of physical activity, and EAR to capture conversations and sound throughout the day. The Family Exchanges Study, a longitudinal study involving middle-aged adults, their romantic partners, grown children and aging parents has generated over 50 publications.

=== Consequential strangers and fringeships ===
Fingerman developed the term consequential strangers and published a book on the idea with Melinda Blau. Consequential strangers are the sum of the personal relationships outside of a person’s close ties. These relationships exist on a spectrum of connections ranging from total strangers to close ties but are unique in their characteristics of repeated and personal interactions. Building on her working with consequential strangers, Fingerman also coined the term fringeships, which describes a casual social connection that lies somewhere between an acquaintance and a close friend.

=== News appearances ===
Aside from academic publications, Fingerman's work has been highlighted in major news outlets including The New York Times, AARP, The Atlantic, The Rest is Science Podcast, and KXAN News

== Selected awards and honors ==
- Molinari Mentorship Award In Adult Development and Aging, American Psychological Association (Division 20) (2026)
- Great Blanton Bake Off Second Place Amateur Division, Blanton Museum of Art (2024)
- Baltes Distinguished Research Achievement Award, American Psychological Association (Division 20) (2022)
- Distinguished Mentorship in Gerontology Award, Gerontological Society of America (2020)
- College of Natural Sciences Teaching Excellence Award, The University of Texas at Austin (2019)
- Executive Management and Leadership Program Fellow, The University of Texas at Austin (2019)
- Top 3 Most Mentioned Articles, Innovations in Aging (2019)
- Super Reviewer Award, Gerontological Society of America (2012) (2018)
- Elected Fellow, American Psychological Association (2012)
- Academic Leadership Program, Committee on Institutional Cooperation (CIC), Purdue University (2010-2011)
- Star Gerontologist Award, Center on Aging and the Life Course , Purdue University (2006)
- Elected Fellow, American Psychological Association (2005)
- Margret Baltes Award for Early Career Achievement in Social and Behavioral Gerontology, Gerontological Society of America (1999)
- Springer Award for Early Career Achievement in Research on Adult Development and Aging, American Psychological Association (Division 20) (1998)
- Schreyer Institute Award for Innovative Teaching, Pennsylvania State University (1997)
- Fellowship for Graduate Study, National Science Foundation (1988-1991)
- Barbara Oleshanky Research Prize, University of Michigan (1989)
- Rotary Scholar, Nairbi, Kenya (1987-1988)
- Undergraduate Commencement Speaker, Harvard University (1987)
