= Stranger (Valient Thorr album) =

Studio album by Valient Thorr
- Released: September 14, 2010
- Genre: Heavy metal, hard rock
- Length: 41:08
- Label: Volcom Entertainment
- Producer: Jack Endino

Valient Thorr chronology
Immortalizer (2008)	Stranger (2010)	Our Own Masters (2012)

Professional ratings
Review scores
Source	Rating
AllMusic	4/5 stars

Stranger is the fifth studio album by the American rock band Valient Thorr. It was released on September 14, 2010.

== Track listing ==
1. "Gillionaire" - 3:02
2. "Sleeper Awakes" - 3:16
3. "Disappearer" - 3:08
4. "Double Crossed" - 4:19
5. "Night Terrors" 4:51
6. "Sudden Death Is Nothing" - 4:34
7. "Woman in the Woods" - 3:01
8. "Vision Quest" - 3:30
9. "Habituary" - 3:15
10. "The Recognition" - 1:16
11. "Without Hope, Without Fear" - 3:36
12. "Future Humans" - 3:26
