= Stranded on Earth =

Studio album by Valient Thorr
- Released: July 1, 2003
- Genre: Heavy metal, hard rock

Valient Thorr chronology
Stranded on Earth	Total Universe Man

Stranded on Earth is an album by American rock band Valient Thorr, released in 2003.

== Track listing ==
1. "One Tuff Customer"
2. "Bigger Badder"
3. "Radiation"
4. "Time Zone"
5. "The Apprentice"
6. "Don't Stop"
7. "Stuck"
8. "Running the Gauntlet"
9. "Swallows of Love"
10. "Walk on Wine"
11. "Stranded on Earth"
12. "Ballad of the Morning Star"
