= Total Universe Man =

Studio album by Valient Thorr
- Released: June 7, 2005
- Genre: Heavy metal, hard rock
- Length: 41:15
- Label: Volcom Entertainment

Valient Thorr chronology
Stranded on Earth (2003)	Total Universe Man (2005)	Legend of the World (2006)

Professional ratings
Review scores
Source	Rating
AllMusic	4/5 stars

Total Universe Man is the second album by American rock band Valient Thorr.

== Track listing ==
1. "Prologue: Civil Blood Makes Civil Hands Unclean" – 1:50
2. "Showdown" – 4:01
3. "Palm Reader" – 2:59
4. "Man Behind the Curtain" – 4:08
5. "Intermission: Thesis of Infinite Measure" – 2:30
6. "I Am the Law'" – 4:02
7. "Sticks and Stones" – 3:36
8. "Intermission: Theme from 6th Grade Watercolor" – 1:12
9. "Hijackers" – 2:03
10. "We Believe in Science" – 2:17
11. "Tough Customer" – 5:44
12. "Blow Up the Pyramid" – 6:58
13. "Untitled" – 10:08

== Trivia ==
- The song "Man Behind the Curtain" is featured in the video game Skate.
