= Familiar stranger =

Individual that is recognized but not known

A familiar stranger is a stranger who is nonetheless recognized by another from regularly sharing a common physical space such as a street or bus stop, but with whom one does not interact. First identified by Stanley Milgram in the 1972 paper The Familiar Stranger: An Aspect of Urban Anonymity, it has become an increasingly popular topic in research about social networks and technologically mediated communication.

Milgram specified that for a person to become a familiar stranger, they must be observed repeatedly over a certain amount of time but never interact with each other. Familiar strangers are more than complete strangers but do not rise to the level of an acquaintance. But if such individuals meet in a different setting, for example a different city or off the street, they are more likely to introduce themselves than would be perfect strangers, as they have a background of shared experiences.

Early experiments on familiar strangers by Milgram involved researchers visiting train stations and university campuses to survey people about who they recognized. They found that 89.5% of people knew at least one familiar stranger. These experiments have been repeated at least once with similar results. One aspect of research on familiar strangers that hampered research was lack of available data about these relationships. With the advent of widespread social media and urban analytics, researchers have used new datasets to understand familiar strangers, including public-transportation usage and web blog networks.

== Foundational studies ==
=== Before Milgram ===
German sociologist Georg Simmel wrote^{[in 1950]} an article discussing the stranger in society. He states that the phenomenon of the "stranger" is the unity of liberation and the fixation of space; physical conditions are the condition and the symbol for human relationships. He wanted to talk about the stranger from the perspective of them being someone who comes today and stays tomorrow rather than a person who comes today and is gone tomorrow. In the organization of the human relations Simmel says that the unison of nearness and remoteness is an important factor. It all comes down to distance, someone who is close to you is really far away and someone who is far from you is actually close by. Simmel^{("as of" 1950)} feels that the stranger is close to us to an extent; we share a connection with each other. Our human nature brings us together so to say, it holds similar national social and occupational features.

=== Milgram's 1972 experiment ===
In 1972, Milgram and his students conducted an experiment to test how widespread the phenomena of familiar strangers was. His students took photographs of people waiting at commuter railway stations during a morning commute. One week later, they returned to the same platform, distributed the photos, and asked recipients to label anyone they either recognized or to whom they had spoken. 89% of the people recognized at least one of the individuals shown in the photos. The average commuter claimed to recognize 4.0 individuals who they had never spoken to, compared to 1.5 individuals they had conversed with. In addition, the experiment observed "socio-metric stars" who were recognized by a large portion of commuters. In qualitative interviews, commuters noted that they imagined what kinds of lives familiar strangers led and what kinds of jobs they held. Milgram described this as a "fantasy relationship that may never eventuate in action."

From this study, Milgram made a number of observations about how familiar stranger relationships are maintained. He noted that the further removed familiar strangers were from their routine encounters, the more likely they would be to engage in interaction and break the familiar stranger relationship. But he also observed the opposite: that in routine settings, a person would be more likely to interact with a complete stranger than a familiar stranger as the complete stranger had no pre-existing interpersonal barriers to overcome. Finally, he noted that breaks in routines, such as health emergencies or natural disasters would cause familiar strangers to interact with each other.

Milgram attributed the phenomena of familiar strangers to urban information overload. He noted that perceptual processing of others is much less cognitively taxing than socially processing them. Thus people perceptually recognize the familiar stranger but cut off any further interaction.

The 1972 paper was based on two independent research projects conducted in 1971, one at City University of New York and the other at a train station. Psychology Today published a second paper on the subject by Milgram, "Frozen world of the familiar stranger: a conversation with Stanley Milgram", in 1974.

=== Milgram revisited ===
In 2004, researchers at the Berkeley Intel Research Laboratory revisited Milgram's study. Their goal was to observe changes in familiar stranger relationships since the initial study and to see how familiarity can affect an individual's comfort in a public place. Recreating Milgram's original experiment, they found similar but slightly lower levels of the phenomena. They found 77.8% of people recognized at least one familiar stranger with an average of 3.1 strangers recognized. They too found evidence of "socio-metric stars" who stood out to many people due to unique visual characteristics like a wheelchair, flowers, or dirty long hair.

Familiar strangers were also found to affect how comfortable people feel in a public location. Four dimensions determined how familiar strangers affected comfort in a public place: the number of familiar strangers, the level of their familiarity, the history of the familiar people in the location, and whether the familiar strangers are found in other contexts.

=== Later studies ===
There have been a number of studies that have further characterized the relationship between familiar strangers using automatically generated sets of data from urban systems. Using bus usage data, it was found that a person's set of familiar strangers is highly based on routine and daily behavior. Familiar strangers come into contact typically during a particular time each day and in a particular location. Unlike other social networks that have densely connected neighborhoods, the network of familiar strangers is more diffuse and evenly distributed. This indicates that person's familiar stranger network can quickly stretch an entire metropolitan area. Wi-Fi usage data for university campuses have provided additional datasets for analyzing familiar strangers. These datasets have yielded similar results as the bus usage data, but the researchers divided relationships based on regularity of interaction and closeness of relationship.

== Characteristics ==
Familiar stranger relationships develop in a predictable manner. They depend on regularity, on-going contact, and public spaces. The concept of invisible tie was proposed to qualify such relationships that involve only limited interaction (if any) and are therefore hardly observable and often overlooked as a relevant type of ties. Familiar strangers nevertheless support people's sense of familiarity and belonging.

== See also ==
- Consequential strangers – Closer relationship than with familiar strangers

== General references ==
- Eric Paulos and Elizabeth Goodman. "Familiar Stranger Project". University of California, Berkeley.
- Rasch, B., & Born, J. (2013) "About Sleep's Role in Memory", Physiological Reviews 93(2): 681–766 doi:10.1152/physrev.00032.2012
- Carlson, N. R. (2013) Physiology of Behavior, Boston: Pearson.
