= Maria Kuncewiczowa =

Polish writer (1895–1989)

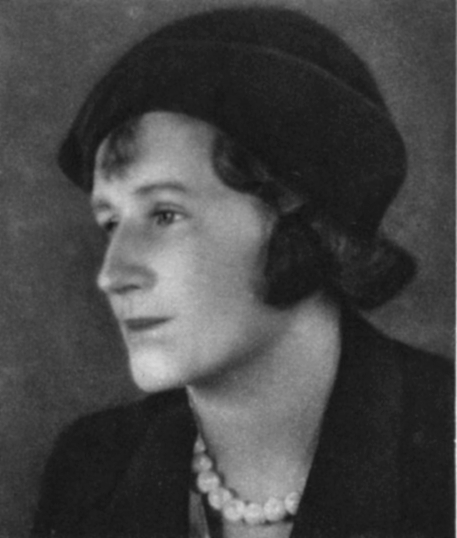
- Born: 30 October 1895; Samara, Russian Empire
- Died: 15 July 1989 (aged 93); Lublin, Poland
- Writing career
- Language: Polish
- Period: 1926–1989
- Genre: novel

Maria Kuncewiczowa (30 October 1895 – 15 July 1989) was a Polish writer and novelist. Kuncewiczowa's works range from short stories to novels, radio novels and literary diaries.

== Early life ==
She was born Maria Szczepańska on October 30, 1895, in Samara, Russian Empire. Her parents had been exiled to Russia for involvement in the January 1863 Polish Insurrection, and the family returned to Warsaw when she was 2 years old. Her parents were members of the Polish intelligentsia class, or the impoverished educated class. Her mother was a violist who gave up her career to raise a family, which was one thing that drew Kuncewiczowa to music in her early life. She studied music and literature in Kraków, Warsaw and Paris before she chose a literary vocation.

She married Jerzy Kuncewicz, a Polish lawyer, writer, and activist, in 1921. One year later, gave birth to their son, Witold Kuncewicz.

== Career in Poland ==
Kuncewiczowa published her first work, Pro Arte et Studio, in 1918 under her maiden name. She had published under pseudonyms for the magazine Le Lierre. Kuncewiczowa began working with the Polish PEN Club in the early 1920s, publishing translations of major works in foreign languages. Kuncewiczowa remained an active member of the PEN Club for the rest of her life.

Kuncewiczowa's major breakout was in 1927 when she published her first collection of short stories, Przymierze z Dzieckiem (Covenant With a Child), which is a collection that explores birth, motherhood, the connection between a mother and her child. These stories remain true to Kuncewiczowa's later exploration of themes concerning the psychology of women, ideas of femininity, and motherhood. Her second major work, Twarz Męzczyzny (A Man's Face, 1928), deals with similar issues of femininity, desire, and sexuality.

Kuncewiczowa's most popular work is Cudzoziemka (The Stranger, 1936), which was translated into several languages and quickly gained her national and international recognition. She drew inspiration for this novel from her mother, who gave up her career as a violinist to raise a family.

In 1938, she was awarded the Gold Laurel (Złoty Wawrzyn) of the Polish Academy of Literature.

== World War II ==
Kuncewiczowa left Poland with her husband in 1939 after the German invasion. Before she left Poland, however, Kuncewiczowa became the first Polish author to publish a radio novel, releasing both Dni powszednie państwa Kowalskich and Kowalscy się odnaleźli in 1938. After she left, she traveled to Paris and England, where she wrote Klucze (The Keys, 1943), a literary diary about her struggles being displaced during World War II.

Kuncewiczowa and her husband moved to the United States in 1956, where she taught Polish language and literature at the University of Chicago. From 1962 to 1968, she lectured at the University of Chicago. She spent 1927–1939 and her last years from 1969 in Kazimierz nad Wisłą. From 1970 to 1984, during winter time, she lived in Italy. Kuncewiczowa and her husband moved back to Poland in 1970, where she wrote two autobiographical works, Fantomy (Phantoms, 1971) and Natura (Nature, 1972). In December 1982 she refused to be awarded state decoration.

== Honors ==
In 1989, the University of Maria Curie-Sklodowska awarded her the title of doctor honoris causa.

== Selected works ==
- Dwa księżyce, Rój, Warszawa 1933; Warszawa: Prószyński i S-ka, 1999. ISBN 9788371805493
- Cudzoziemka, 1936; Warszawa : Wydawnictwo Pi, 2013. ISBN 9788378362258
  - The stranger, London: Hutchinson International Authors, 1947. OCLC 812595307
  - A stranger, London: Pushkin Press, 2027. ISBN 9781782697374
- Zmowa nieobecnych 1946; Warszawa : Instytut Wydawniczy Pax, 1978.
  - The conspiracy of the absent, a novel. London: Hutchinson & Co, 1950 OCLC 3431553
- Leśnik, 1952
  - The forester : a novel, New York : Roy Publishers, 1954. OCLC 891212262
- Gaj oliwny, 1961; Lublin : Wydawn. Lubelskie, 1990. ISBN 9788322205808
- Tristan 1946, 1967; Bratislava : Tatran, 1972.
