= Cudzoziemka =

1936 novel by Maria Kuncewiczowa

Cudzoziemka (The Stranger) is a Polish psychological novel by Maria Kuncewiczowa, published as a book in 1936. Earlier, the novel appeared in instalments in the newspaper (Kurier Poranny). Cudzoziemka is considered a classic of the interwar period of Polish literature.

The novel was published in 1944 in an English translation by B. W. A. Massey. A new translation under the title A Stranger, by Ursula Phillips, is due for publication in 2027.

== Content ==
The protagonist, Róża Żabczyńska, was born in the half of 19th century in Taganrog, Russia, to a Polish family. As a girl, she is deeply affected by her ethnic differences. However, her alienation grows even bigger when she moves to Warsaw in order to take up violin lessons. She finds out that she is a stranger wherever she comes. The young girl experiences a dramatic love disappointment and then – as it later proves – an artistic failure.

She decides to marry a man she does not love. Her family life is a losing streak. She descends into madness even harder a couple of years later, when her beloved son, Kazimierz, dies at an early age.

The womanly sensitivity of Róża, confronted with her life disappointments, turns her into a cruel wife and a mean mother, humiliating all the people around her.

The purpose of Cudzoziemka is to show the psychological truth about sorrow, and especially about woman's sorrow. On the other hand, the novel illustrates the art of narrative.

== Form ==
The novel is divided into two plots. One of them consists of contemporary events, limited to one ordinary day, filled with reflection and thoughts of the protagonist. They are an introduction to and an excuse for the second plot – the retrospective and digressive one. In conclusion, the book tells the story of one particular day, and – in the meantime – also tells the whole story of the life of Róża Żabczyńska.

== The film ==
The film version of Cudzoziemka (with the same title) was directed by Ryszard Ber in 1986. Maria Kuncewiczowa herself wrote the screenplay. Ewa Wiśniewska portrayed the main character, Róża Żabczyńska. The film was awarded twice during the 11th Polish Feature Films Festival in Gdańsk in 1986 (11. Festiwal Polskich Filmów Fabularnych w Gdańsku).
