= Perfect Stranger =

Perfect Stranger may refer to:

== Books ==
- The Perfect Stranger (book), an autobiography by P. J. Kavanagh
- A Perfect Stranger (novel), a 1981 romance novel by Danielle Steel
- The Perfect Stranger (novel) The Perfect Stranger (novel) A mystery by Megan Miranda

== Films and TV ==
- El Perfecto Desconocido, a 2011 film starring Colm Meaney
- Perfect Stranger (film), a 2007 suspense film
- The Perfect Stranger (film), a 2005 Christian film
- Danielle Steel's A Perfect Stranger, a 1994 film
- "A Perfect Stranger" (Upstairs, Downstairs), tenth episode of the third series of the British television series, Upstairs, Downstairs

== Music ==
- Perfect Stranger (musician), an Israeli psytrance music producer
- Perfect Stranger (band), an American country music quartet
- Perfect Stranger (T. G. Sheppard album), a 1982 album by T. G. Sheppard
- The Perfect Stranger (Frank Zappa album), a 1984 album by Frank Zappa
- Desconocida (a.k.a. Perfect Stranger), 1998 studio album by Marta Sanchez
- "Perfect Stranger" (Cheap Trick song), 2006
- "Perfect Stranger" (Magnetic Man song), 2010
- "Perfect Stranger" (Southern Pacific song), 1985
- Perfect Stranger, a 2008 album by K.Maro
- "Perfect Stranger", a song by Erasure from their 1991 album Chorus
- "Perfect Stranger", a song by the Donnas from their 2009 compilation album, Greatest Hits Vol. 16
- The Perfect Stranger, 1982 album by Jesse Colin Young
- "The Perfect Stranger", a song by Dale Bozzio from the 1988 album Riot in English
- "Perfect Stranger", a song by FKA Twigs from the 2025 album Eusexua

== Other ==
- Perfect Stranger, a womenswear brand owned by Universal Store

== See also ==
- Perfect Strangers (disambiguation)
- Stranger
