= Le Quotidien d'Oran =

Daily French-language Algerian newspaper

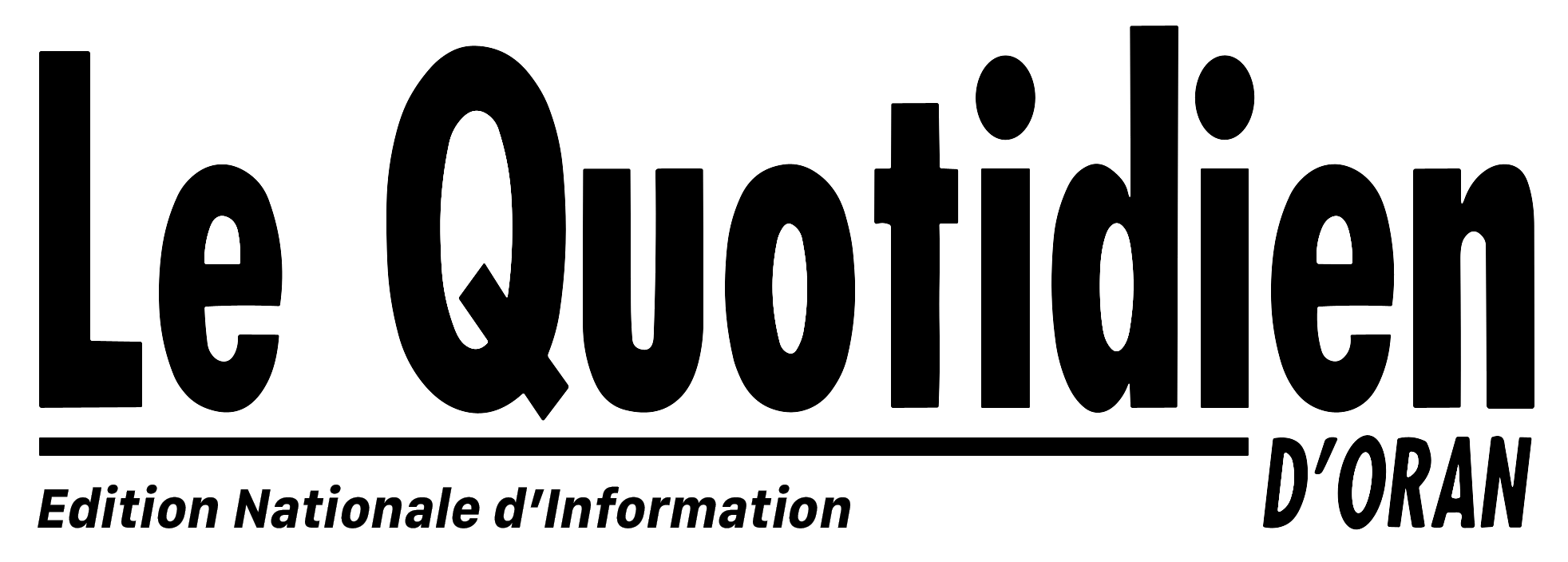
Le Quotidien d'Oran logo

Le Quotidien d'Oran (Arabic: لو كوتيديان دوران; ISSN 1111-2166) is a daily French-language Algerian newspaper, headquartered in Oran, Algeria.

It was established on 14 December 1994.

The editor is Kamel Daoud. The column "Raïna Raïkoum" ("My Opinion, Your Opinion") is written by Daoud.
