= The Strangers (soundtrack) =

The Strangers (Original Motion Picture Soundtrack)

Film score by Tomandandy
- Released: May 27, 2008
- Recorded: 2007–2008
- Venue: Bratislava, Slovakia
- Genre: Film score
- Length: 45:42
- Label: Lakeshore
- Producer: Tomandandy

Tomandandy chronology
Right at Your Door (2007)	The Strangers (2008)	Sleep Dealer (2009)

The Strangers (Original Motion Picture Soundtrack) is the film score soundtrack to the 2008 film The Strangers directed by Bryan Bertino and starring Liv Tyler and Scott Speedman. The original score is composed by Tomandandy and performed by the Slovakian based Bratislava Symphony Orchestra. The album was released through Lakeshore Records on May 27, 2008.

== Development ==
"The inspiration behind soundtrack for The Strangers had to do with two things: One, with perspective. A lot of the sounds that are louder in terms of volume or more prominent are actually soft sounds that are very closely miked. Like a Cello playing very, very softly but it's actually quite loud. Relative to say a distorted, loud electric guitar which is actually very soft in the background. So, it's playing with these types of perspectives that are non-traditional or unexpected. The other one was this idea that a lot of the music is really in the silence and try to punctuate that silent space in slightly more thoughtful ways, rather than just try to fill the acoustic space. It was really leveraging ambience and silence as a big piece of the soundtrack."

— Thomas Hajdu

The duo of Thomas Hajdu and Andy Milburn, under the stage name Tomandandy, had provided the musical score for The Strangers. Hajdu noted that the inspiration behind The Strangers soundtrack was primarily influenced by Bernard Herrmann's Psycho (1960), both in terms of the sonic perspective and punctuating silence through music. The duo sat in a dark room watching the film to understand its arc, where it goes from subdued and quiet to intensely loud and planned to make as little music and combine it as a part of the sound design, especially through the sounds of an engine, old record player, natures which were taken into consideration.

Considering how silence provided a new perspective on horror films, they created "3 AM Knock" that utilizes a silent tone that built into the crescendo of fear, which allowed a different context for the music and an innovative approach on how horror music being made. The duo also intentionally mixed strange sounds with familiar sounds, which was a combination of analog, synthetic, and ambient sounds, along with silence put together in unusual ways, especially in the opening track that had an 1960s Alien saucer sound in the middle of the track. Most of the instruments for particular tracks were built on processed cello sounds combined with electric guitars to provide a unique, screeching sound.

The score is performed by the Slovakian based Bratislava Symphony Orchestra. The composers provided extreme freedom to the sound team, on blending the sounds with the music, which re-recording mixers Marti D. Humphrey and Chris Jacobson had complimented about.

== Reception ==
Jeff Swindoll of Monsters and Critics stated, "It's a creepy score for what appears to be a movie that well makes you jump as well as make sure that the doors are locked at night."

Zach Freeman of Blogger News wrote "This is an impressive score and adds a tremendous chill-factor to the film. Apart from the film, and simply as a score, it's still an absolute triumph of horror tonality."

William Ruhlmann of AllMusic wrote: "Strings play sustained notes at the high ends of their ranges to make for an eerie mood and are mixed with electronic sounds, the whole given added resonance by the use of echo and reverb."

Brent Simon of Screen International wrote: "...the film's soundtrack ... makes fine use of crackling fire and record player pops in the background."

== Track listing ==
All tracks are written by Tomandandy.

No.	Title	Length
1.	"Opening"	2:31
2.	"The House"	1:46
3.	"Empty"	1:26
4.	"Wedding"	2:53
5.	"Apology"	0:49
6.	"James and Kristen"	2:39
7.	"3 AM Knock"	4:47
8.	"Alone"	4:02
9.	"James Returns"	3:51
10.	"Run to Car"	1:54
11.	"Waiting"	1:11
12.	"Angry"	1:44
13.	"Mike"	4:17
14.	"Cold"	0:53
15.	"The Barn"	3:05
16.	"Run"	2:36
17.	"Scrape"	1:57
18.	"Mercy"	2:02
19.	"Alone"	1:22
Total length:		45:42

== Additional music ==
Songs featured in the film but not included in the soundtrack: (Note: Adapted from the closing credits of The Strangers.)

- "Ariel Ramirez" by Richard Buckner
- "Hopeful" by Jennifer O'Connor
- "At My Window Sad and Lonely" by Billy Bragg and Wilco
- "Sprout and the Bean" by Joanna Newsom
- "My First Lover" by Gillian Welch
- "Mama Tried" by Merle Haggard

== Personnel ==
Credits adapted from liner notes

- Music composer and producer – Tomandandy
- Orchestra – Bratislava Symphony Orchestra
- Orchestrator – Dwight Mikkelsen
- Conductor and copyist – Allan Wilson
- Contractor – Paul Talkington
- Cello – Jessica Catron
- Guitar – Jeremy Drake, G.E. Stinson
- Electronics – G.E. Stinson
- Sound effects – Jeremy Drake
- Engineer – Todd Brodie
- Recording – Peter Fuchs
- Mixing – Jamie Steele
- Mastering – Blue Labyrinth Production Music
- Music editor – Sheri Ozeki
- Music supervisor – Season Kent
- Production supervisor – Jennifer Towle
- Executive producer – Brian McNelis, Skip Williamson
- Photography – Philip V. Caruso
- Art direction – John Bergin, Stephanie Mente
- Layout – Linda Karr
- A&R – Eric Craig
- Music business and legal affairs – Christine Bergren

== Accolades ==
Award/association	Year	Category	Recipient(s) and nominee(s)	Result	Ref.
Fangoria Chainsaw Awards	2009	Best Score	Tomandandy	Nominated	
