= The Stranger (2012 film) =

- Directed by: Filiz Alpgezmen
- Written by: Filiz Alpgezmen
- Produced by: Eylem Akin
- Starring: Sezin Akbaşoğulları, Caner Cindoruk, Serkan Keskin
- Cinematography: Özgür Polat
- Edited by: Cicek Kahraman
- Music by: Baris Dokuzer
- Release date: October 13, 2012 (Warsaw Film Festival)
- Running time: 94 minutes
- Country: Turkey
- Languages: Turkish and French

The Stranger (Turkish: Yabancı) is a 2012 Turkish drama film directed by Filiz Alpgezmen. It was entered into the 18th London Turkish Film Festival.

== Plot ==
The film centres around a young French woman of Turkish origin. She is trying to fulfill her late father's last wish - to be buried in Istanbul, despite being defined as a "revolutionary" who left Turkey undercover during the 1980 coup d'état.

== Cast ==
- Sezin Akbasoğulları
- Caner Cindoruk
- Serkan Keskin
