= The Stranger (comic book) =

2013 comic book by Jacques Ferrandez

The Stranger (L'étranger)
- Page count: 136 pages
- Publisher: Éditions Gallimard

Creative team
- Writer: Jacques Ferrandez, after Albert Camus
- Artist: Jacques Ferrandez

Original publication
- Date of publication: 12 April 2013
- Language: French
- ISBN: 978-2-07-064518-3

Translation
- Publisher: Pegasus Books
- Date: 7 June 2016
- ISBN: 9781681771359
- Translator: Sandra Smith

The Stranger (French: L'étranger) is a 2013 comic book written and illustrated by Jacques Ferrandez. It is based on the novel The Stranger by Albert Camus and depicts a seemingly indifferent Frenchman before and after he shoots an Arab to death in French Algeria.

Ferrandez was born in Algiers and his grandparents had a shoe shop in Belcourt across the street from where Camus grew up. He decided to make an adaptation of The Stranger for the 100th anniversary of Camus' birth. The comic book was published in English translation in 2016.
