= Stranger =

Person who is unknown to other persons

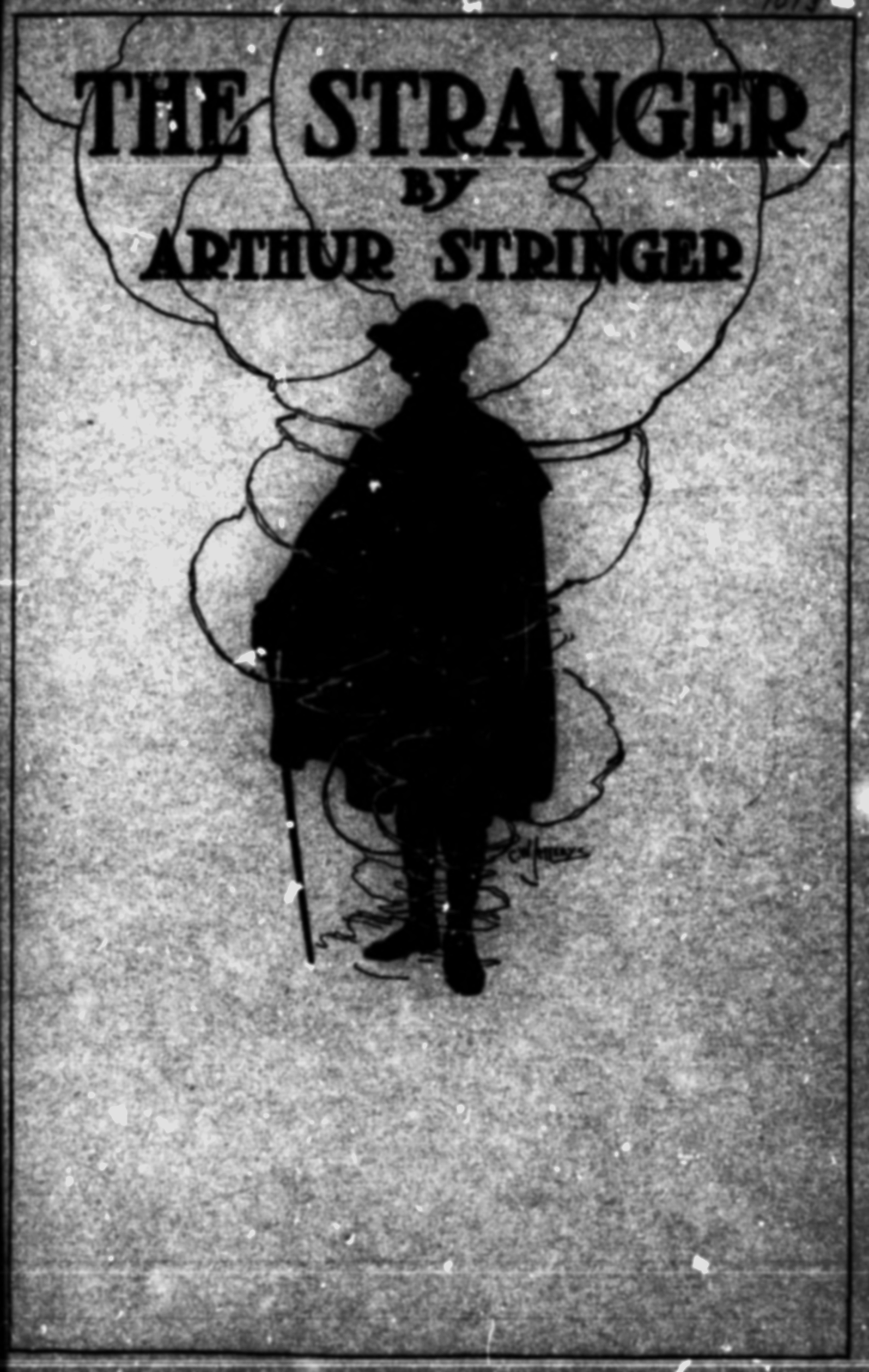
The 1919 book, The Stranger, is one of many works of fiction revolving around circumstances following the arrival of a stranger in the lives of established characters.

A stranger is a person who is unknown or unfamiliar to another person or group. Because of this unknown status or unfamiliarity, a stranger may be perceived as a threat until their identity and character can be ascertained. Different classes of strangers have been identified for social science purposes, and the tendency for strangers and foreigners to overlap has been examined.

The presence of a stranger can throw an established social order into question, "because the stranger is neither friend nor enemy; and because he may be both". The distrust of strangers has led to the concept of stranger danger (and the expression "don't talk to strangers"), wherein excessive emphasis is given to teaching children to fear strangers despite the most common sources of abduction or abuse being people known to the child.

== Definitions ==
A stranger is commonly defined as someone who is unknown to another. Since individuals tend to have a comparatively small circle of family, friends, acquaintances, and other people known to them—a few hundred or a few thousand people out of the billions of people in the world—the vast majority of people are strangers to one another. It may also more figuratively refer to a person for whom a concept is unknown, such as describing a contentious subject as "no stranger to controversy," or an unsanitary person as a "stranger to hygiene". A stranger is typically represented as an outsider, and a source of ambivalence, as they may be a friend, an enemy, or both. The word stranger derives from the Middle French word estrangier, meaning a foreigner or alien.

The boundaries of what people or groups are considered strangers varies according to circumstances and culture, and those in the fields of sociology and philosophy in a variety of broader contexts. According to sociologist and philosopher Zygmunt Bauman, every society produces its own strangers, and the natures of "strangeness" is "eminently pliable [and] man-made". (Note: According to Rumford, Bauman's work has been singularly important in the sociology of the stranger. Rumford writes, "It is difficult to find a contemporary account of the stranger which does not orient itself in relation to Bauman's work.") Alternatively, Lisa Atwood Wilkinson has written that "[b]y definition, whoever is a stranger to me is someone who is not a philos: a stranger is a person who is not related to me by blood or marriage, not a member of my tribe or ethne, and not a fellow citizen." Another asserts that "[i]t has been argued by many a philosopher that we are all strangers on earth, alienated from others and ourselves even in our own country".

=== Types of strangers ===
The state of being a stranger may be examined as a matter of degrees. For example, someone may be a partial stranger in cases where they are unable to communicate, or another is unable to understand aspects of an individual, their perspective or experiences. Alternatively, one may be a moral stranger to another who acts "out of fundamentally divergent moral commitments", even though the person may be a close friend or family member.

A stranger with whom a person has previously had no contact of any kind may be referred to as a "total stranger" or "perfect stranger". Some people who are considered "strangers" due to the lack of a formally established relationship between themselves and others are nonetheless more familiar than a total stranger. A familiar stranger is an individual who is recognized by another from regularly sharing a common physical space such as a street or bus stop, but with whom one does not interact. First identified by Stanley Milgram in the 1972 paper The Familiar Stranger: An Aspect of Urban Anonymity, it has become an increasingly popular topic in research about social networks and technologically-mediated communication. Consequential strangers are personal connections other than family and close friends. Also known as "peripheral" or "weak" ties, they lie in the broad social territory between strangers and intimates. The term was coined by Karen L. Fingerman and further developed by Melinda Blau, who collaborated with the psychologist to explore and popularize the concept.

=== Strangers and foreigners ===
A stranger is not necessarily a foreigner, although a foreigner is highly likely to be a stranger:

A foreigner, the dictionary tells us, is someone not from one's own country, while a stranger is someone who is neither one's friend nor acquaintance. Although they overlap, the two meanings are not synonymous: a stranger is often a foreigner, though not necessarily (he may live just around the corner); most foreigners are also strangers, though not necessarily (one can have foreign friends). Foreignness implies passports and questions of citizenship or national belonging, in addition to evoking personal feelings of acceptance or rejection (“how exotic, how foreign” or “foreigners keep out!”). Strangerhood can also involve legal status, but is generally more weighted toward the affective: the “stranger in our midst” is not always a foreigner; he or she may carry our pass- port and still be considered—both subjectively and by others—as not belonging, not “one of us” (or, from the stranger's point of view, “one of them”).

According to Chris Rumford, referencing the work of sociologist and philosopher Georg Simmel, "people who are physically close by can be remote and those who are far away may in fact be close in many ways". With the conglomeration of populations into large cities, people now have a historically high propensity to "live among strangers".

Adopting a statist view, strangers may be seen as a chaotic challenge to the order imposed and sought by the nation-state, which is then faced with the challenge of assimilating the stranger, expelling them, or destroying them. Although this view may overlook important issues of what authority defines the stranger, and how that determination is made.

== Interactions with strangers ==
Interactions with strangers can vary widely depending on the circumstances and the personalities of the people involved. Some people have no difficulty striking up conversations with strangers, while others experience strong discomfort at the prospect of interacting with strangers. At the opposite end of the spectrum, some people are excited by engaging in sex with strangers. Psychologist Dan P. McAdams writes:

Knowing where somebody stands on extraversion or neuroticism is indeed crucial information in the evaluation of strangers and others about whom one knows very little. It is the kind of information that strangers quickly glean from one another as they size one another up and anticipate future interactions. It is the kind of information that people fall back on when they know little else about the other who is being observed.

=== Stranger anxiety ===
Video from the Centers for Disease Control showing the distressed reaction of a nine-month-old to encountering a stranger

Infants will generally be receptive to strangers until after they achieve object permanence and begin forming attachments. Thereafter stranger anxiety typically emerges, and young children will normally exhibit signs of distress when presented with unfamiliar individuals, and will tend to prefer those with whom they are familiar rather than strangers. (Note: Described generally as "apprehension at the unfamiliar", this may also be related conceptually and/or developmentally to separation anxiety.) This reaction is generally referred to as stranger anxiety or stranger wariness.

According to one review, the reaction to strangers may differ somewhat according to gender. While there were no gender differences observed at three months of age, girls appeared to exhibit stranger fear at an earlier average age than boys, at about eight to nines months old, although boys quickly caught up, and examinations of nine to 17 months old recorded no differences. Studies have shows that infants tend to show a preference for strangers if they are near their own age. However, this preference may reverse in situations which include fear-producing stimuli.

The severity of stranger anxiety may be affected by individual temperament, capacity for self-regulation, and caregiver anxiety. Stranger anxiety may be mitigated through a number of techniques, including positive interaction between the stranger and companions, and arranging for familiar surroundings.

=== Stranger danger ===
For older children, instruction is often provided in schools and homes on so called "stranger danger". This often stems from public fears regarding stranger offenders, individuals who may approach children in public places with the intention of abduction or abuse, possibly due in part to their perception of children as vulnerable targets. Statistically, children who are abducted are much more likely to be taken by someone who is an acquaintance or family member. According to one estimate, "classic stranger abductions" accounted for only 0.014% of total missing children annually in the United States, or about 14 per 100,000. (Note: These were defined as "stereotypical kidnappings", abductions perpetrated by a stranger or slight acquaintance and involving a child who was transported 50 or more miles, detained overnight, held for ransom or with the intent to keep the child permanently, or killed.) Furthermore, of all abductions by non-family members, the majority (59%) were of teenagers, rather than children. In similar statistics reported by the National Center for Missing & Exploited Children (NCMEC), only about 1% of abductions were from non-family members, while 91% of those abducted were classified as endangered runaways.

This has led to calls to de-emphasize stranger danger, as Nancy McBride of NCMEC told NBC News, "let's take stranger-danger and put it in a museum. We need to teach our kids things that are actually going to help them if they are in trouble." This was echoed by sociologist, and director of the Crimes Against Children Research Center, David Finkelhor, writing in The Washington Post:

We'd do much better to teach them the signs of people (strangers or not) who are behaving badly: touching them inappropriately, being overly personal, trying to get them alone, acting drunk, provoking others or recklessly wielding weapons. We need to help children practice refusal skills, disengagement skills and how to summon help.

=== In adults ===
Alfred Hitchcock's 1951 thriller, Strangers on a Train, which revolves around the social dynamics of strangers meeting in passing with little expectation of future interaction, a scenario which research suggests predisposes people to be more open and willing to self-disclose information

In their review of the sociological literature, Semin and Fiedler concluded that the perception of strangers tends to be based primarily on group membership, and their identity as a member of an out-group, because a stranger is, by definition, not known individually. This may magnify the perceived motives or intentions of the stranger, but may also vary greatly according to the circumstances and the environment. Among environmental factors, physical uncomfortably, such as presence in a room that is hot and crowded, have been shown to increase negative attitudes toward strangers.

Laboratory evidence has indicated that individuals are likely to behave less modestly when meeting face-to-face with strangers, when no friends or acquaintances were present. As explained by Joinson and colleagues, "they tend to present more of their ideal self-qualities to strangers than they do to friends." However, this appeared to be reversed when two strangers met one another online in the absence of friends, which elicited the most modest self-presentation, more so than online interactions with strangers conducted in the presence of friends.

In willingness to disclose information, researchers have identified what has been dubbed the stranger-on-the-train phenomenon, wherein individuals are inclined to share a great deal of personal information with anonymous individuals. This may be influenced by the temporary nature of their relationship, and the knowledge that the stranger themselves have no access to an individual's wider social circle. As one author put it, the phenomenon is ironically best described by the words of travel writer Paul Theroux, saying:

The conversation, like many others I had with people on trains derived an easy candour from the shared journey, the comfort of the dining car, and the certain knowledge that neither of us would see each other again.

This may be helpful in eliciting self-disclosure in the context of therapy or counseling, and can encourage openness and honesty. However, research also suggests that this phenomenon is mediated by the expectation of future interaction with the stranger.

== In religion ==
The New Testament Greek translation of "stranger" is xenos, which is the root word of the English xenophobia, meaning fear of strangers and foreigners alike. Strangers, and especially showing hospitality to strangers and strangers in need is a theme throughout the Old Testament, and is "expanded upon — and even radicalized — in the New Testament.

In the King James Version of the Old Testament, Exodus 23:9 states: "Also thou shalt not oppress a stranger: for ye know the heart of a stranger, seeing ye were strangers in the land of Egypt". Some other translations use "foreigner" instead of "stranger".

== Observations by the stranger ==
There is a concept in sociological literature of the "professional stranger", the person who intentionally maintains an intellectual distance from the community in order to observe and understand it.

The examination of different theories of the stranger has underscored that certain types of strangers develop special powers of observation due to their spatial and social position.

...

Theories of the stranger have alluded to in-between strangers such as ambivalent people, the genius, the marginal man and the cosmopolitan, who develop a type of hybrid knowledge or hybrid consciousness that challenges conventional knowledge... they are professional strangers because there is an unequal one because the construction of meaning and understanding is skewed towards the former.

...

These in-between strangers, however, are not always associated with the stranger as Other or foreigner.

== See also ==
- Alterity, a philosophical and anthropological term meaning “otherness"
- Hospitality, the relationship between a guest and a host, including the reception and entertainment of guests, visitors, or strangers
- Martian scientist, a hypothetical stranger popularly used in thought experiments
- Online predator, strangers who prey on victims via the internet
- Strangeness, a property of particles in physics
