= Prix François Mauriac (Aquitaine) =

French literary award

The Prix François Mauriac (François Mauriac Prize), officially or originally titled Prix Francois-Mauriac de la région Aquitaine, is a French literary prize. Founded in 1985 and revived in 2002, the prize is awarded in October each year. It is named after French writer François Mauriac.

== History ==
The prize, founded in 1985 by the regional authority, was initially awarded to authors from Aquitaine or books on topics related to the region. After an hiatus, the prize was revived on the initiative of the president of the Centre François Mauriac de Malagar, Bernard Cocula, on the occasion of the 50th anniversary of the Nobel Prize in 2002.

From 2006 onwards, high school and vocational school students were invited to the awards event.

== Description ==
The Prix François Mauriac aka Prix Francois-Mauriac de la région Aquitaine) is awarded by president of the Conseil régional de Conseil régional de Nouvelle-Aquitaine (the regional authority) at the Centre François Mauriac de Malagar, which is housed in the Domaine de Malagar (Malagar Estate), around 50 km (31 mi) south of Bordeaux, France, the former home of Francois Mauriac and now an historic site.

Since its relaunch in 2002, the award recognises work by any French-language writer whose content, whatever the genre (novel, theatre, poetry, essay, journalism), demonstrates the author's commitment to his century and is evocative of the society of his time. The award ceremony is held in October each year. The prize is worth 8,000 euros.
