= Strangers (Marvel Comics) =

Strange
- Cover to Doctor Strange: Sorcerer Supreme #61; Art by Melvin Rubi and Hector Collazo

Publication information
- Publisher: Marvel Comics
- First appearance: Doctor Strange: Sorcerer Supreme #61
- Created by: David Quinn (writer); Melvin Rubi (artist)

In-story information
- Abilities: Aetheric energy blasts, super strength, near invulnerability

Vincent Stevens
- Cover to Doctor Strange: Sorcerer Supreme #63; Art by Johnson and Fred Harper

Publication information
- Publisher: Marvel Comics
- First appearance: Doctor Strange: Sorcerer Supreme #62
- Created by: David Quinn (writer); Max Douglas (artist)

In-story information
- Full name: Vincent Stevens
- Abilities: Near invulnerability, possession

The Strangers, individually named Strange and Vincent Stevens, are fictional magical beings appearing in American comic books published by Marvel Comics. The characters were created by David Quinn and Melvin Rubi.

In a year-long storyline published in 1994 in Doctor Strange: Sorcerer Supreme, Doctor Strange creates the Strangers out of aetheric energy a part of a plan to defeat the demon sorceress Salomé. The storyline began a year previously in Doctor Strange: Sorcerer Supreme #50 (February, 1993), in which Doctor Strange loses access to the extradimensional entities who give him his magical abilities, following his refusal to participate in the War of the Seven Spheres. In Doctor Strange: Sorcerer Supreme #60 (December, 1993) Doctor Strange cannot prevent his Sanctum Sanctorum from being destroyed, leaving him open to an attack by Salomé. The events were part of the "Siege of Darkness" crossover running through the Midnight Sons comic books.

== Publication history ==
Doctor Strange: Sorcerer Supreme #61 (January 1994) featured the first appearance of Strange, who replaced Doctor Strange for the remaining two issues of the Siege of Darkness crossover. Those final two issues were Ghost Rider/Blaze: Spirits of Vengeance #18 (January, 1994) and Midnight Sons Unlimited #4 (January, 1994).

Vincent Stevens first appeared in Doctor Strange: Sorcerer Supreme #62 (February, 1994) and the story of the Strangers continued in that series until the storyline concluded in issue #75 (March, 1995).

Strange made one guest appearance outside of the major storylines involving the two characters. This took place in Warlock and the Infinity Watch #36 (dated January 1995).

== Fictional character biography ==
After losing most of his magical abilities due to his refusal to take part in the War of the Seven Spheres, Doctor Strange aids the Nine (the group the Midnight Sons family of titles was built around) in their battle against the demon Zarathos, the demon mother Lilith and her children the Lilin. During this fight Doctor Strange and the Nine take refuge within Strange's Sanctum Sanctorum, which is then besieged and destroyed by the Lilin.

Doctor Strange and his allies eventually triumph over their foes, and banish Lilith and her children to another dimension known as "Shadowside". The means they take to ensure this happens allows the Fallen (corrupted members of the ancient race known as the Blood) to return from their ages long extra-dimensional exile to follow their ancient leader - Zarathos.

One of those who returns is Salomé, who in ancient times was Sorceress Supreme, and who wants her title back. Her first act is to attack Doctor Strange and infect him with a magical virus of her own creation called Salomé's Dance. Dying from this virus, Doctor Strange launches a desperate plan to stop Salomé. As he teleports away, two artificial beings, who Doctor Strange comes to refer to as the Strangers, are created using aetheric energy, only one being seen at first. This first being takes Doctor Strange's place in the battle against Zarathos and the Fallen and becomes known by the name Strange.

Doctor Strange takes refuge in a new Sanctum Sanctorum located underground beneath Trinity Church, and creates an aura there using aetheric energy that stops the progression of Salomé's Dance. Searching for a cure, Doctor Strange sends Strange out to procure objects of power, including the Oculus Oroboros from Romania, the Song of the Blood Opal of the Whole Moon Hawk from Australia, and the Coral Crab from Atlantis.

While all of this is happening, the second Stranger appears on the streets of New York, takes the name Vincent Stevens and quickly makes a name for himself as a psychiatric consultant and the owner of the office tower the Tempo.

Stevens' high profile and close appearance to his creator attracts the attention of Salomé who sends two of her followers to kidnap him. These two individuals are Wong (Doctor Strange's servant who currently serves Salomé) and Xaos—Wong's deceased former love resurrected as an undead skeleton. Stevens is rescued from Salomé's lair by Strange and in the process both discover their true nature. They also discover the fact that their bodies are unstable and deteriorating and that the only way to survive is to merge into one being—something Stevens decides he doesn't want to do.

While Doctor Strange's creations are deciding what to do next, his former love Clea arrives in New York seeking him. She quickly finds his new Sanctum Sactorum and request his aid against her uncle Dormammu, who is once again the ruler of her native Dark Dimension. Doctor Strange explains why he can't currently help, but promises to send aid in any way he can.

Now knowing his full situation, Stevens begins to search for a way to escape his fate. Locating a collector of arcane artifacts named Mr. Azopardi, Stevens begins to subtly press him to allow Stevens access to the Levant Rubric, an ancient book containing spells Stevens believes will save him without having to merge with Strange. Mr. Azopardi turns out to be a person of great paranoia, who suspects Stevens of being a demon who wants to steal his soul. Mr. Azopardi lures Stevens into a trap and attempts to kill him. His life is saved only when Strange arrives and kills Azopardi. In the process, the Levant Rubric is destroyed and an enraged Stevens totally rejects Strange.

Having been rejected by Stevens, Strange begins to seek another individual to merge with to save his existence. After failing to convince the X-Men's Polaris, he next contacts Rick Jones. Seeking revenge, Stevens possesses the Hulk and uses him in an effort to destroy Strange. This effort fails and Stevens finally agrees to the merger.

It is at this point that Doctor Strange finishes his creation of a suit of armour made of aetheric energy that protects him from the effects of Salomé's Dance. He confronts the Strangers and attempts to reabsorb the aetheric energy he used to create them to use it in his coming confrontation with Salomé. Stevens rebels against his creator and is destroyed in the ensuing fight.

Seeing his chance to merge with Stevens and live is now gone, Strange flies into a rage, but is calmed by Doctor Strange. Strange is sent to the Dark Dimension by his creator and there he merges with a dying warrior named Nobel. The new combination of the two calls himself Paradox and takes his place alongside Clea.

== Powers and abilities ==
Both Strangers had bodies made of aetheric energy that healed almost any injury almost immediately.

The means they used the aetheric energy in their bodies differed from there. Strange displayed superhuman strength and the ability to project blasts made of aetheric energy, while Stevens predominantly used abilities to control and possess other individuals.
