= 2022 Mediterranean Games =

19th edition of the Mediterranean Games

XIX Mediterranean Games
- Emblem of the 2022 Mediterranean Games
- Host city: Oran
- Country: Algeria
- Edition: 19th
- Nations: 26
- Athletes: 3,390
- Sport: 24
- Events: 234
- Opening: 25 June 2022
- Closing: 6 July 2022
- Opened by: President Abdelmadjid Tebboune
- Closed by: Prime Minister Aymen Benabderrahmane
- Main venue: Miloud Hadefi Stadium
- Website: oran2022.dz

The 2022 Mediterranean Games (Arabic: ألعاب البحر الأبيض المتوسط 2022, romanized: ʾAlʿāb al-Baḥr al-ʾAbyaḍ al-Mutawassiṭ 2022), officially known as the XIX Mediterranean Games and commonly known as Oran 2022, was an international multi-sport event held from 25 June to 6 July 2022 in Oran, Algeria. Oran was announced as the host city at the ICMG General Assembly in Pescara, Italy, on 15 August 2015. They were supposed to take place in 2021, but they were delayed to 2022 due to the COVID-19 pandemic. 3,298 athletes (2,014 men and 1,284 women) took part in the games. When the event was held in 2022, it reset the 4-year cycle of the event.

== Bidding process ==
Five cities signed an official bidding declaration for hosting the 2021 Mediterranean Games, two from Africa and three from Europe:

The final bidding cities were Oran and Sfax. Oran planned to take the Games to Algeria for the second time after the 1975 Mediterranean Games in Algiers. Sfax planned to take the Games to Tunisia for the third time after the 1967 Mediterranean Games and the 2001 Mediterranean Games, both in Tunis. Oran won by 51–17 after voting.

Location of Oran in Algeria

2022 Mediterranean Games bidding results
City	NOC	Round 1	Round 2
Oran	Algeria	Adv	51
Sfax	Tunisia	Adv	17
Mostar	Bosnia and Herzegovina	Elim	—
Dubrovnik	Croatia	Elim	—
Kotor	Montenegro	Elim	—

=== Host city selection ===
Cities from five countries submitted their bids to host the 2021 Mediterranean Games. Oran, Algeria, has been chosen to host the Games. The North African city was elected during the International Committee for the Mediterranean Games (ICMG) General Assembly, which took place on 27 August 2015 in Pescara, Italy.

Oran took the vote by a considerable margin, winning 51 to 17 over Sfax, Tunisia, which was the other final contender to host the 2021 Games. This is the second time that an Algerian city has hosted the Mediterranean Games, the first was in 1975, in Algiers, the country's capital. Oran is the 2nd largest city in Algeria, with a population of roughly 1.2 million.

== Development and preparation ==
The Minister of Youth and Sports, El Hadi Ould Ali, inaugurated on 30 October 2016 at Oran, the headquarters of the organizing committee of the 19th Mediterranean Games 2021 in the presence of the Wali, Abdelghani Zaalane, the Presidents of the People's Provincial Assembly (APW), Fethallah Chaâbni, the Presidents of the People's Municipal Assembly (CPA), Nourredine Boukhatem and the President of the Algerian Olympic Committee, Mustapha Berraf. Several personalities from the world of sport took part in the inauguration as a legendary football star, Lakhdar Belloumi, and the boxer star, Mustapha Moussa, and also consuls of different Mediterranean countries.

The headquarters of the Committee was located in NLA boulevard in the old daïra completely renovated. It was Senator and Secretary General of the Organizing Committee of the Mediterranean Games (COMG), Abdelhak Kazi-Tani and Secretary General of the Algerian Sports and Olympic Committee, Abdelhafid Izem, who initialed the seat allocation paper.

=== Venues ===
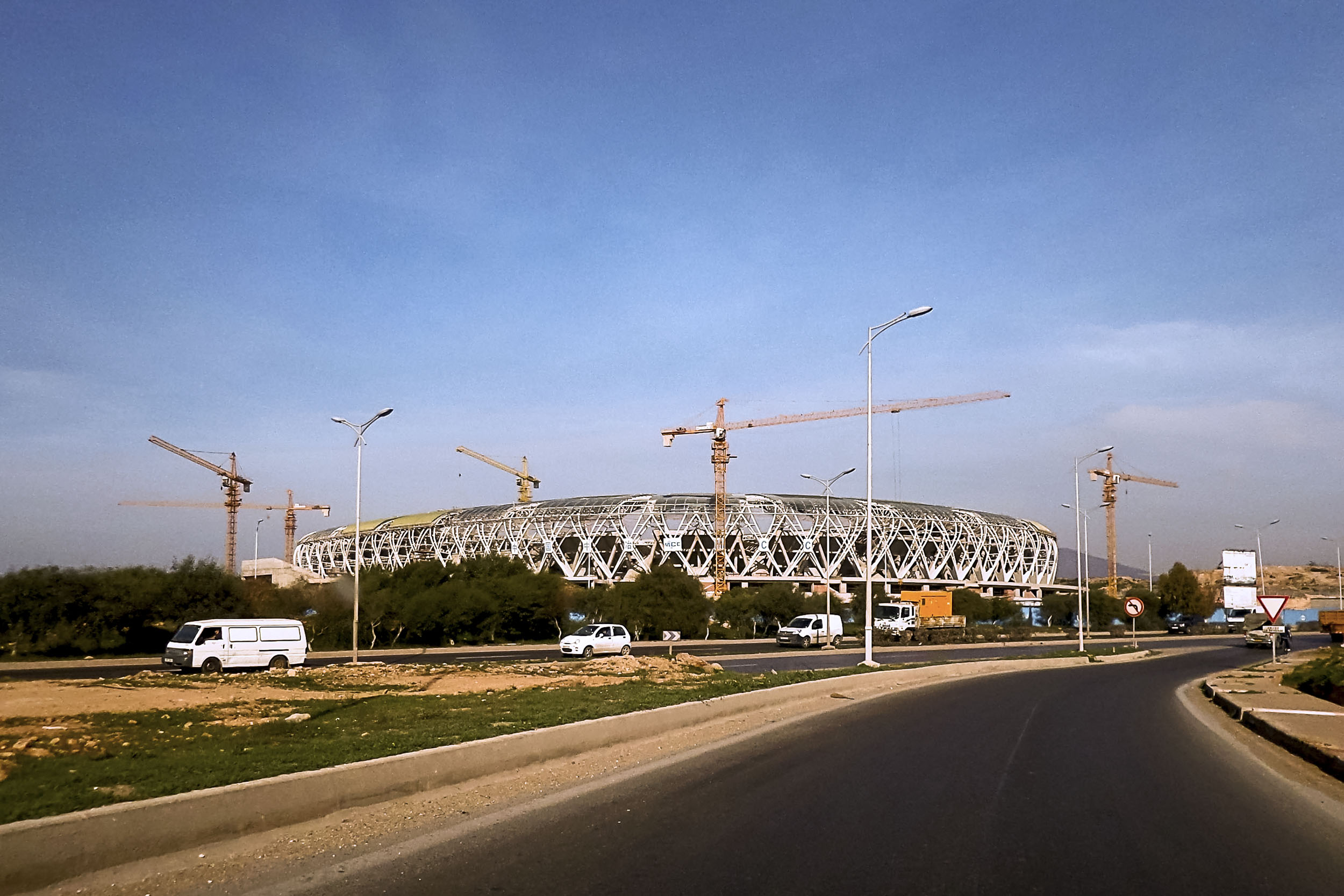
Miloud Hadefi Stadium under construction in 2015

The main stadium of the 2022 Mediterranean Games is the Miloud Hadefi Stadium which is a part of the Olympic Complex in Bir El Djir, Oran. The stadium hosted both the opening and closing ceremonies.

Oran
- Football
- Volleyball
- Judo
- Table tennis

Bir El Djir

- Swimming
- Athletics
- Handball
- Basketball
- Cycling
  - Road
- Judo
- Karate
- Water polo
- Tennis
- Taekwondo
- Archery

Arzew

- Handball

List of venues, showing the city, venue, sport and venue capacity
City	Venue		Sport	Capacity	Status
Aïn El Turk	El Hachemí Hantaz Hall		Handball	1,000	Existing, renovated
Arzew	24 February Indoor Hall		Handball	3,000	Existing
Bir El Djir	Miloud Hadefi Complex Annexial Stadium		Archery	4,500	New
Bir El Djir	Miloud Hadefi Complex Omnisport Arena		Gymnastics (Art. gym. & Rhy. gym.)	7,000	New
Bir El Djir	Miloud Hadefi Complex Omnisport Arena		Handball	7,000	New
Bir El Djir	Belgaïd Multipurpose Omnisport Hall		Volleyball	1,000	Existing, renovated
Bir El Djir	Miloud Hadefi Stadium		Athletics	40,143	New
Bir El Djir	Miloud Hadefi Stadium		Football (final)	40,143	New
Bir El Djir	Miloud Hadefi Complex Aquatic Center		Swimming	3,000	New
Bir El Djir	Miloud Hadefi Complex Aquatic Center		Water polo	3,000	New
Bir El Djir	Oran Tennis Complex		Tennis	3,000	Existing
Es Sénia	Antar Ibn Chaddad Equestrian Center		Equestrian	4,000	Existing
Es Sénia	The LOFA Complex		Boules	500	Existing, renovated
Les Andalouses, El Ançor	Nautical Base		Sailing	—N/a	Temporary
Hassi Ben Okba	Hassi Ben Okba Shooting Center		Shooting	500	Existing
Mers El Hadjadj	Mers El Hadjadj Stadium		Football	5,400	Existing, renovated
Oran (Metropole)	5th periph.		Cycling	—N/a	Temporary
Oran (Center)	Sidi M’hamed Public Garden Court		Basketball 3x3	300	Existing, renovated
Oran (El Hamri)	Ahmed Zabana Stadium		Football	40,000	Existing
Oran (Haï El Akid Lotfi)	Convention Centre Mohammed Ben Ahmed Halls	Hall 1 & 2	Table tennis	1,500	Existing
Oran (Haï El Akid Lotfi)	Convention Centre Mohammed Ben Ahmed Halls	Hall 1 & 2	Fencing	1,500	Existing
Oran (Haï El Akid Lotfi)	Convention Centre Mohammed Ben Ahmed Halls	Hall 3 & 6	Karate	1,500	Existing
Oran (Haï El Akid Lotfi)	Convention Centre Mohammed Ben Ahmed Halls	Hall 3 & 6	Judo	1,500	Existing
Oran (Haï El Akid Lotfi)	Convention Centre Mohammed Ben Ahmed Halls	Hall 3 & 6	Taekwondo	1,500	Existing
Oran (Haï El Salam)	Habib Khelil Tennis Complex		Tennis	1,000	Existing, renovated
Oran (Mdina Jdida)	EMEC Expositions Palace Hall		Boxing	1,000	Existing
Oran (Mdina Jdida)	EMEC Expositions Palace Hall		Weightlifting	1,000	Existing
Oran (Mdina Jdida)	EMEC Expositions Palace Hall		Wrestling	1,000	Existing
Oran (Mdina Jdida)	Hamou Boutlélis Sports Palace		Volleyball	5,000	Existing
Oran (Mdina Jdida)	Oran Public Garden Swimming Pool		Water polo	2,000	Existing
Oued Tlélat	Multipurpose Omnisport Hall		Badminton	1,000	Existing, renovated
Sig	Abdelkrim Kerroum Stadium		Football	20,000	Existing
Sig	Sports Olympic Swimming Pool		Water polo		Existing

=== Gallery ===
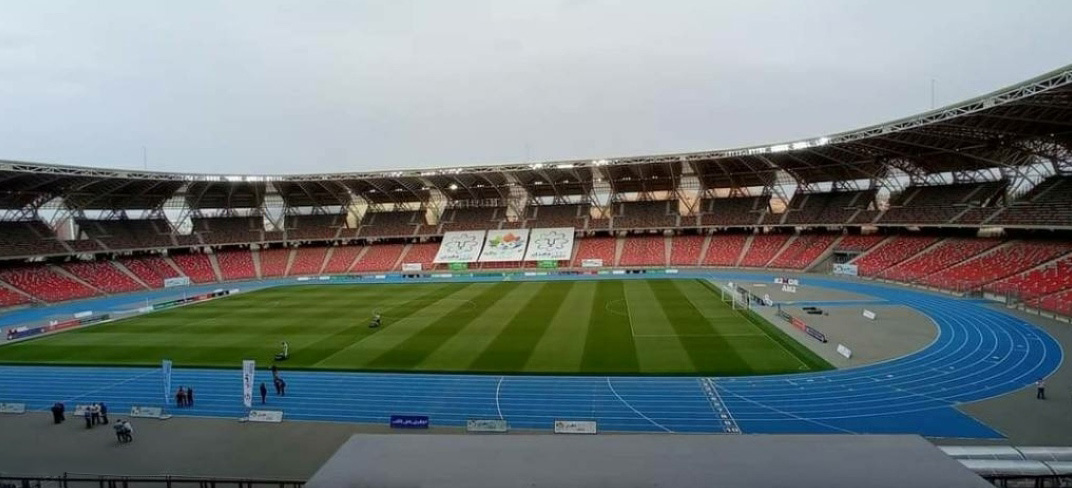
Miloud Hadefi Stadium

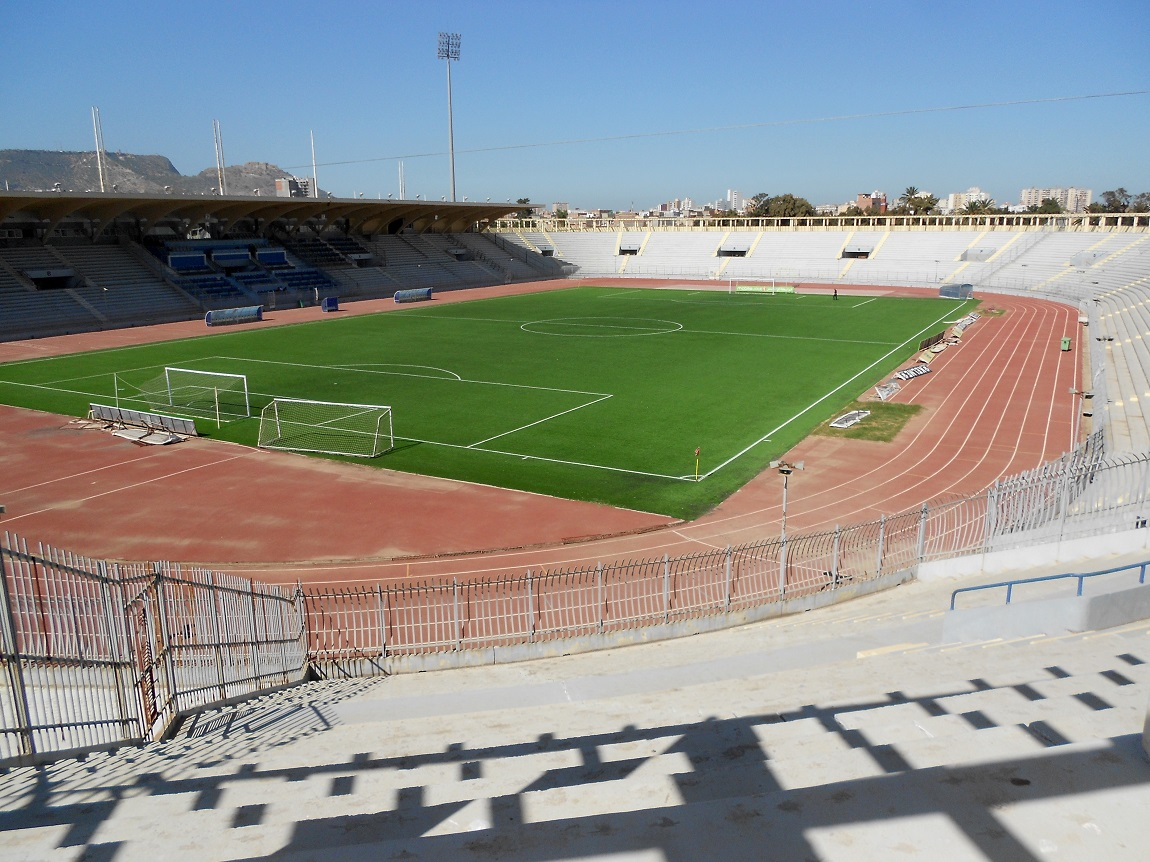
Ahmed Zabana Stadium

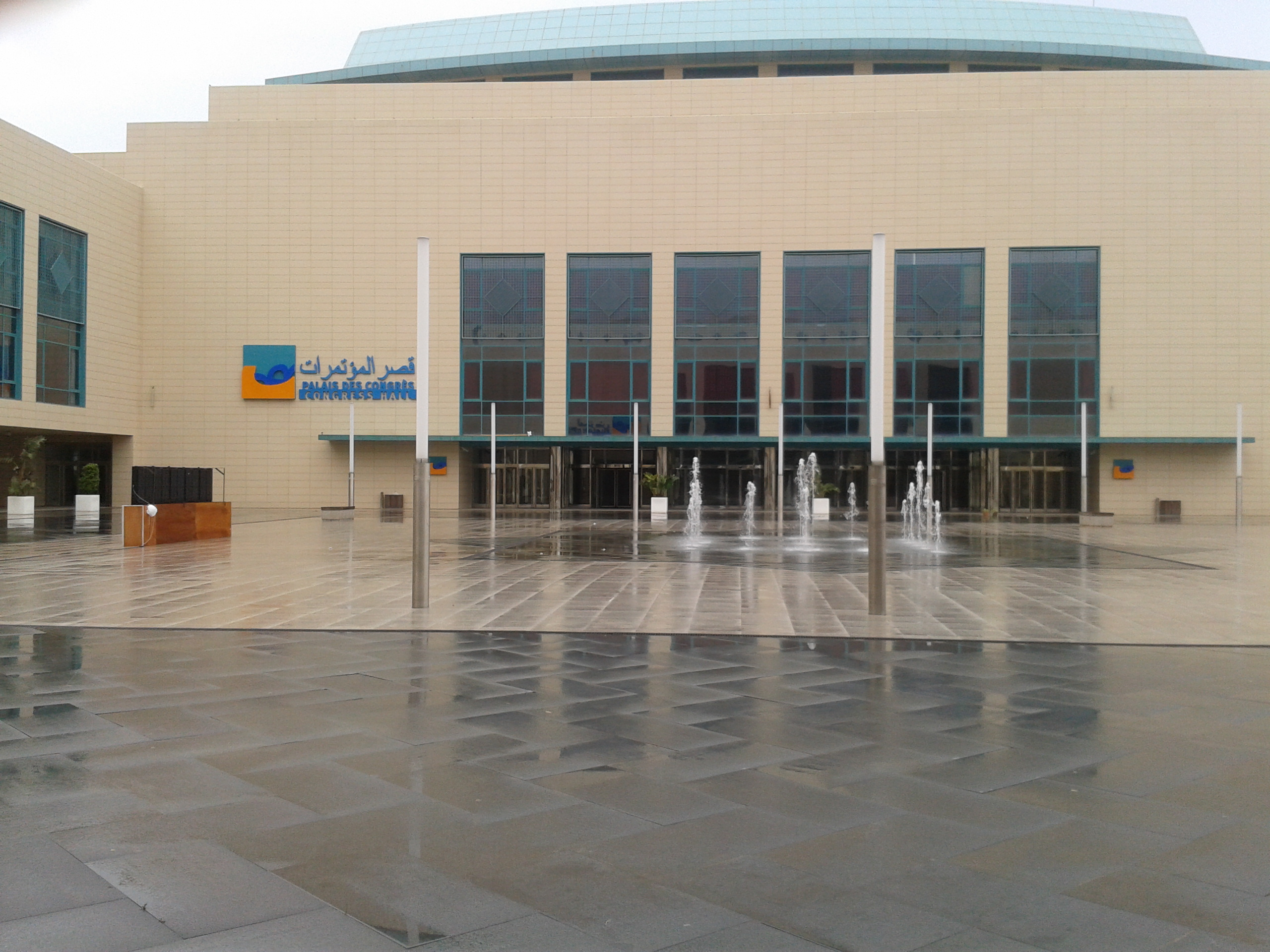
Oran Conventions Center

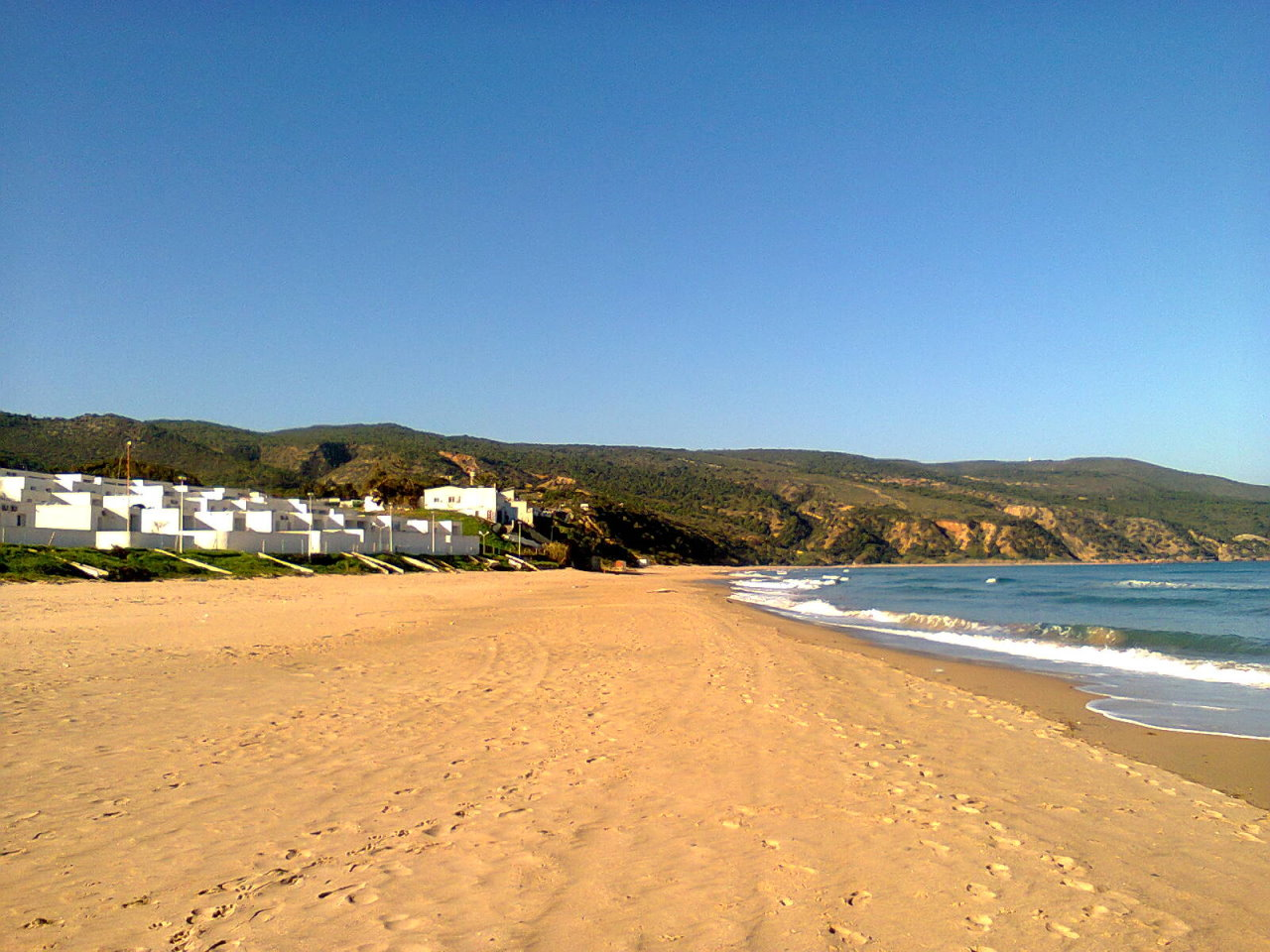
The Andalouses Touristic Complex

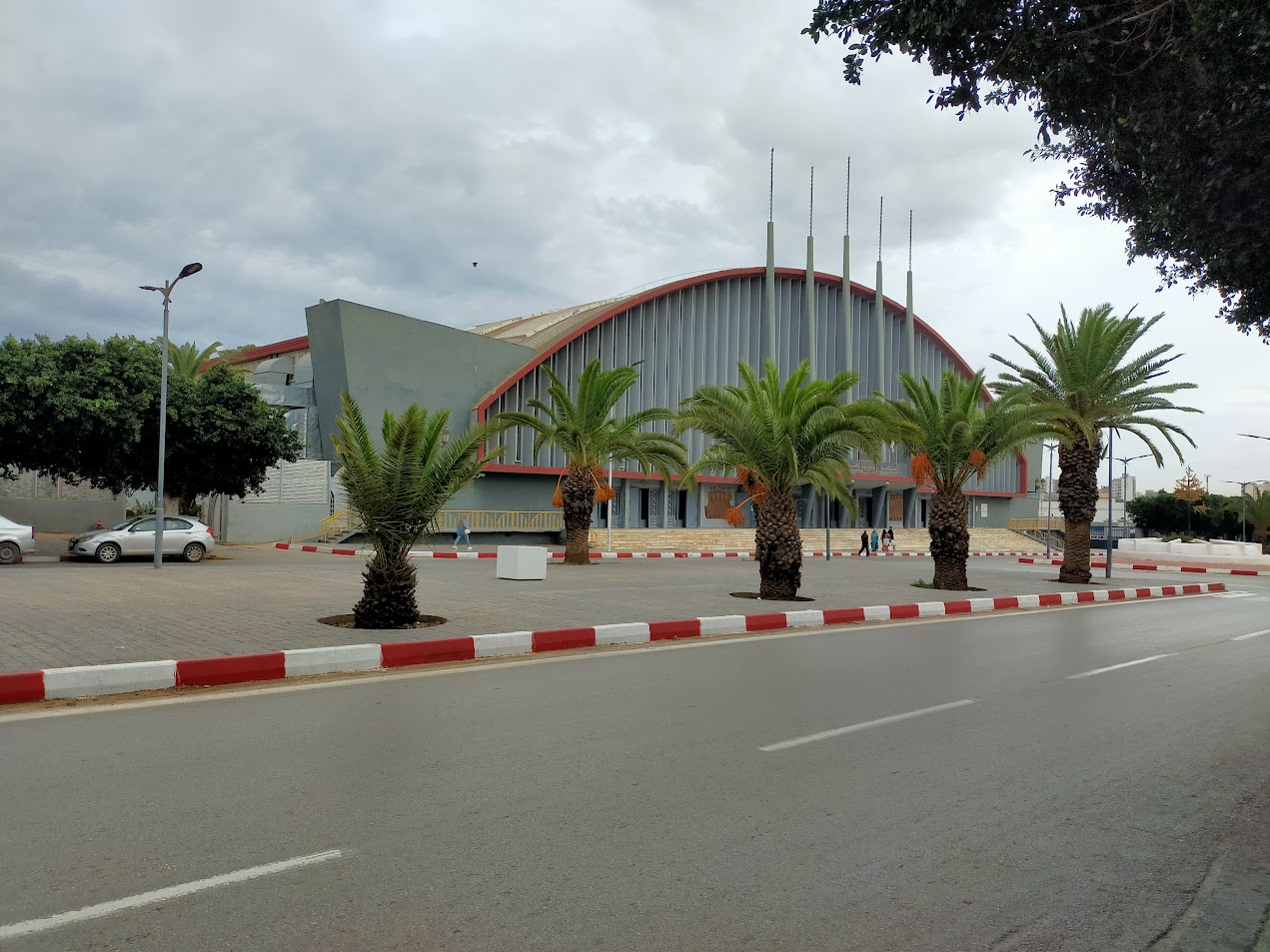
Hamou Boutlélis Sports Palace

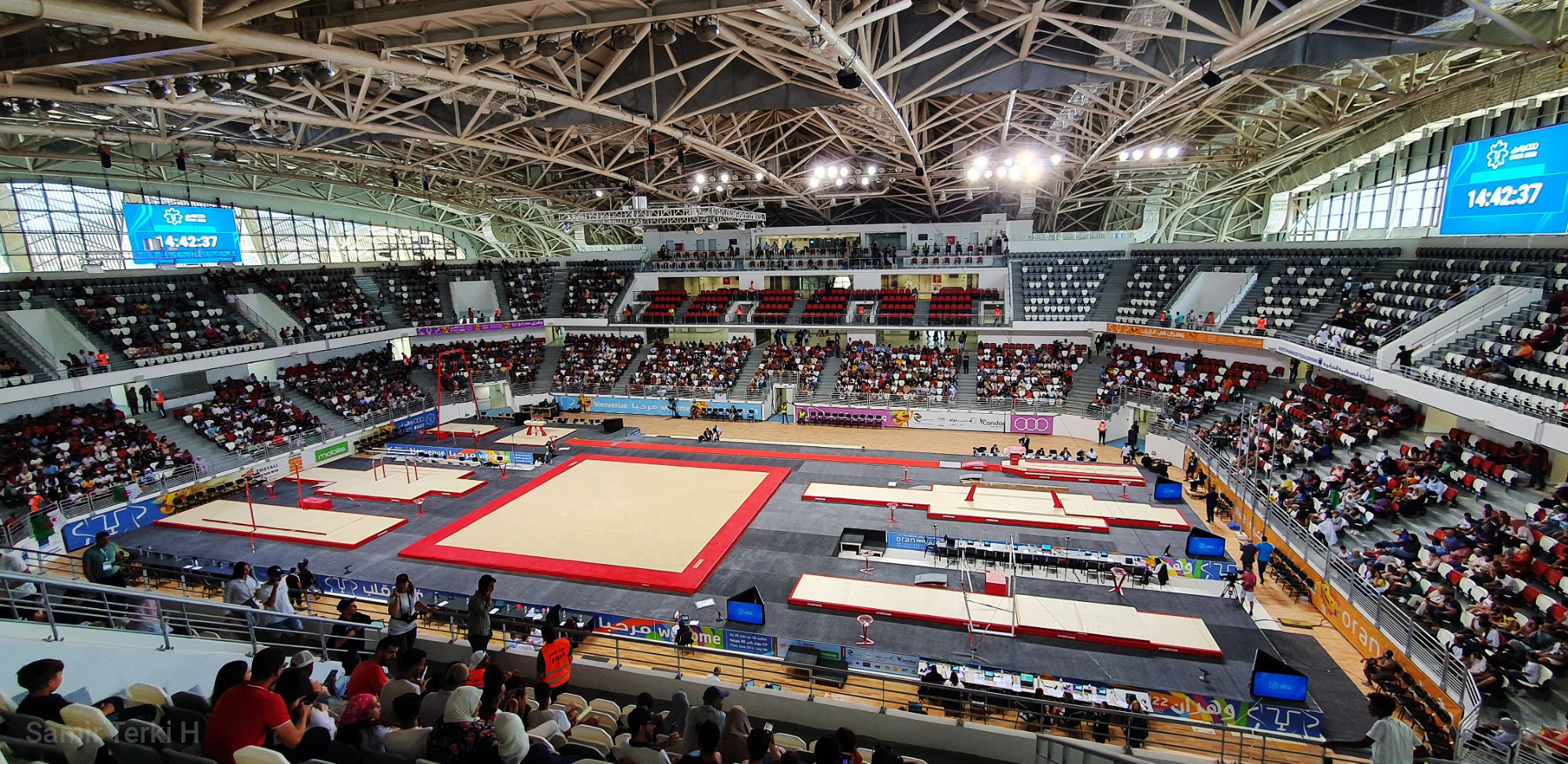
Miloud Hadefi Complex Omnisport Arena

=== Costs ===
The Wilaya of Oran has allocated 5 billion DA for the construction of a large sports infrastructure program including an Olympic complex in Bir El Djir, Miloud Hadefi Stadium, athletics stadium, multi-purpose sports halls, center hosting sports, playgrounds and green spaces, in addition to the Mediterranean village in progress. The planned rehabilitation of the old sports infrastructure of Oran was taken.

=== Emblem and mascot ===
The logo as well as the graphic charter of the Mediterranean Games Oran 2021 was redone in September 2019. Wihro, the mascot of the Mediterranean Games Oran 2021 represents a lion (symbol of the city of Oran) with the colors of the games and of the Mediterranean basin.

== The Games ==
=== Sports ===
The 2022 Mediterranean Games sports program featured 24 sports encompassing 234 events.

2022 Mediterranean Games sports programme
- Aquatics
  - Swimming (38)
  - Water polo (1)
- Archery (5)
- Athletics (38)
- Badminton (4)
- Basketball (2)
- Boules (12)
- Boxing (15)
- Cycling
  - Road (4)
- Equestrian
  - Jumping (2)
- Fencing (6)
- Football (1)
- Gymnastics
  - Artistic gymnastics (14)
- Handball (2)
- Judo (14)
- Karate (10)
- Sailing (4)
- Shooting (11)
- Table tennis (4)
- Taekwondo (8)
- Tennis (4)
- Volleyball (2)
- Weightlifting (16)
- Wrestling (17)

=== Participating nations ===
Participating National Committees
- Albania (50)
- Algeria (389) (host country)
- Andorra (11)
- Bosnia and Herzegovina (54)
- Croatia (110)
- Cyprus (113)
- Egypt (191)
- France (313)
- Greece (176)
- Italy (371)
- Kosovo (40)
- Lebanon (38)
- Libya (14)
- Malta (31)
- Monaco (17)
- Montenegro (32)
- Morocco (137)
- North Macedonia (79)
- Portugal (163)
- San Marino (20)
- Serbia (160)
- Slovenia (139)
- Spain (282)
- Syria (26)
- Tunisia (175)
- Turkey (324)
- Vatican City (1)*

* One athlete from the Vatican City participated in an unofficial ("non-scoring") manner in the women's half marathon event.

=== Calendar ===
●	Opening ceremony	●	Competitions	●	Event finals	●	Closing ceremony

	June / July													Events
Sport	24th Fri	25th Sat	26th Sun	27th Mon	28th Tue	29th Wed	30th Thu	1st Fri	2nd Sat	3rd Sun	4th Mon	5th Tue	6th Wed	Events
Ceremonies		●											●	
Archery						●	●	5						5
Artistic gymnastics			1	1	2	10								14
Athletics							7	10	9	12				38
Badminton			●	2	●	●	2							4
Basketball							●	●	●	2				2
Boules			●	●	●	12								12
Boxing			●	●	●	●	●	15						15
Cycling							2		2					4
Equestrian								1		1				2
Fencing										2	2	2		6
Football			●		●		●		●		1			1
Handball				●	●		●	●	●		●		2	2
Judo						5	4	5						14
Karate			6	4										10
Sailing				●	●	●	●	●		4				4
Shooting					●	3	2	2	2	2				11
Swimming								7	8	8	7	8		38
Table tennis			●	2	●	●	2							4
Taekwondo										4	4			8
Tennis				●	●	●	2	2						4
Volleyball			●	●	●		●	●	●		2			2
Water polo	●	●	●	●	●	●	1							1
Weightlifting								4	4	4	4			16
Wrestling			●	5	6	6								17
Total			7	14	8	36	22	51	25	39	20	10	2	234
Cumulative Total			7	21	29	65	87	138	163	202	222	232	234	234
	June / July													Total events
Sport	24th Fri	25th Sat	26th Sun	27th Mon	28th Tue	29th Wed	30th Thu	1st Fri	2nd Sat	3rd Sun	4th Mon	5th Tue	6th Wed	Total events

== Medal table ==
* Host nation (Algeria)

Rank	Nation	Gold	Silver	Bronze	Total
1	Italy	48	50	61	159
2	Turkey	45	26	37	108
3	France	21	24	36	81
4	Algeria*	20	17	16	53
5	Spain	16	25	25	66
6	Egypt	13	15	23	51
7	Serbia	13	7	11	31
8	Greece	10	11	10	31
9	Portugal	7	10	8	25
10	Tunisia	6	8	13	27
11	Slovenia	6	8	9	23
12	Croatia	6	7	10	23
13	Cyprus	5	2	7	14
14	Syria	4	3	0	7
15	Morocco	3	13	17	33
16	Kosovo	3	0	3	6
17	San Marino	2	1	3	6
18	Albania	2	1	1	4
19	Bosnia and Herzegovina	2	0	6	8
20	Montenegro	1	4	2	7
21	North Macedonia	1	0	2	3
22	Monaco	1	0	0	1
23	Malta	0	1	0	1
24	Libya	0	0	1	1
Totals (24 entries)		235	233	301	769

Source: Medal Standings

== Broadcasting ==
The European Broadcasting Union subsidiary Eurovision Sport is the owner of the broadcasting rights according to a contract signed with CIJM.

Territory	Broadcaster	Ref
Algeria	EPTV (Official broadcaster)	
Albania	RTSH	
Andorra	RTVA	
Bosnia and Herzegovina	BHRT	
Cyprus	CyBC	
Egypt	ON Time Sports	
France	France Télévisions	
Italy	RAI	
Greece	ERT	
Montenegro	RTCG	
Morocco	SNRT	
Portugal	RTP	
Spain	RTVE	
Turkey	TRT	

Preceded by Tarragona	Mediterranean Games; Oran; 2022	Succeeded by Taranto
