= Football at the 2022 Mediterranean Games =

2022 Men's Mediterranean Games Football Tournament

Tournament details
- Host country: Algeria
- City: Oran
- Dates: 26 June – 5 July
- Teams: 8 (from 2 confederations)
- Venues: 4 (in 3 host cities)

Final positions
- Champions: France (2nd title)
- Runners-up: Italy
- Third place: Morocco
- Fourth place: Turkey

Tournament statistics
- Matches played: 16
- Goals scored: 37 (2.31 per match)
- Top scorer: (Italy) Antonio Raimondo (6 goals)

Football at the 2022 Mediterranean Games – Men's tournament took place between 26 June and 5 July 2022 at the Ahmed Zabana Stadium, Mers El Hadjadj Stadium and Abdelkrim Kerroum Stadium. Associations affiliated with FIFA were invited to send their men's U-18, U-19 and U-21 national teams. There was no women's tournament on this occasion.

== Participating nations ==
Nine nations have applied to compete in men's tournament, one more than at the previous games. None of the Asian nations opted to compete.

Men

Confederation	Nation
CAF (Africa)	Algeria U18; Morocco U18
AFC (Asia)	None
UEFA (Europe)	France U18; Greece U18; Italy U18; Portugal U18; Spain U18; Turkey U18

== Schedule ==
P	Group stage	½	Semifinals	B	Bronze medal match	F	Gold medal match

Event↓/Date →	26 Sun	27 Mon	28 Tue	29 Wed	30 Thu	1 Fri	2 Sat	3 Sun	4 Mon	
Men	G		G		G		½		B	F

== Venues ==
4 stadiums were allocated to host the matches.

Football at the 2022 Mediterranean Games is located in Algeria	Bir El Djir (Oran)	El Hamri (Oran)
Football at the 2022 Mediterranean Games is located in Algeria	Miloud Hadefi Stadium	Ahmed Zabana Stadium
Football at the 2022 Mediterranean Games is located in Algeria	Capacity: 40,143	Capacity: 40,000
Football at the 2022 Mediterranean Games is located in Algeria	Sig	Mers El Hadjadj
Football at the 2022 Mediterranean Games is located in Algeria	Abdelkrim Kerroum Stadium	Mers El Hadjadj Stadium
Football at the 2022 Mediterranean Games is located in Algeria	Capacity: 20,000	Capacity: 5,400

== Group stage ==
=== Group A ===
Pos	Team	Pld	W	D	L	GF	GA	GD	Pts	Qualification
1	France	3	2	1	0	5	3	+2	7	Semifinals
2	Morocco	3	1	1	1	3	2	+1	4	Semifinals
3	Algeria (H)	3	1	0	2	3	5	−2	3	
4	Spain	3	0	2	1	2	3	−1	2	

Source: Oran 2022
(H) Hosts
26 June 2022
17:00

Spain	0–1	Algeria
	Report	Puch-Herrantz 27'

Abdelkrim Kerroum Stadium, Sig
Referee: Evangelos Manouchos (Greece)
26 June 2022
20:00

France	1–0	Morocco
Messoussa 15'	Report

Abdelkrim Kerroum Stadium, Sig
Referee: Luca Pairetto (Italy)

28 June 2022
17:00

Algeria	0–2	Morocco
	Report	Boukhres 48'; Raihani 64'

Abdelkrim Kerroum Stadium, Sig
Referee: Amir Loucif (Tunisia)
28 June 2022
20:00

Spain	1–1	France
Gómez 47'	Report	Dimi 55'

Ahmed Zabana Stadium, Oran
Referee: Zorbay Küçük (Turkey)

30 June 2022
20:00

Morocco	1–1	Spain
Khalifi 23' (pen.)	Report	Rodríguez 12'

Abdelkrim Kerroum Stadium, Sig
Referee: Bruno José Costa (Portugal)
30 June 2022
20:00

Algeria	2–3	France
Chegra 56' (pen.); Zaoui 79'	Report	Messoussa 8', 28'; Bouanani 81' (pen.)

Ahmed Zabana Stadium, Oran
Attendance: 40,000
Referee: Luca Pairetto (Italy)

=== Group B ===
Pos	Team	Pld	W	D	L	GF	GA	GD	Pts	Qualification
1	Italy	3	2	1	0	5	0	+5	7	Semifinals
2	Turkey	3	1	1	1	2	3	−1	4	Semifinals
3	Portugal	3	1	0	2	2	3	−1	3	
4	Greece	3	1	0	2	3	6	−3	3	

Source: Oran 2022
26 June 2022
17:00

Greece	1–2	Turkey
Volakis 81'	Report	Yılmaz 39'; Biçer 45+1'

Mers El Hadjadj Stadium, Mers El Hadjadj
Referee: Jérémie Pignard (France)
26 June 2022
20:00

Italy	1–0	Portugal
Raimondo 77'	Report

Ahmed Zabana Stadium, Oran
Referee: Karim Sabry (Morocco)

28 June 2022
17:00

Italy	4–0	Greece
Raimondo 47', 65', 90+1' (pen.); D'Andrea 79' (pen.)	Report

Mers El Hadjadj Stadium, Mers El Hadjadj
Referee: Lotfi Bekouassa (Algeria)
28 June 2022
20:00

Portugal	2–0	Turkey
Falé 15'; de Freitas 53'	Report

Abdelkrim Kerroum Stadium, Sig
Referee: Youcef Gamouh (Algeria)

30 June 2022
17:00

Portugal	0–2	Greece
	Report	Koutsias 76', 79'

Abdelkrim Kerroum Stadium, Sig
Referee: Lamia Atman (Algeria)
30 June 2022
17:00

Turkey	0–0	Italy
	Report

Mers El Hadjadj Stadium, Mers El Hadjadj
Referee: Amir Loucif (Tunisia)

== Knockout stage ==
Semifinals
2 July – Sig
France	2
Turkey	0
2 July – Sig
Italy	2
Morocco	1

Final
4 July – Bir El Djir
France	1
Italy	0
Third place
4 July – Bir El Djir
Turkey	2
Morocco	4

=== Semifinals ===
2 July 2022
17:00

France	2–0	Turkey
Messoussa 10'; Dimi 84'	Report

Abdelkrim Kerroum Stadium, Sig
Referee: Youcef Gamouh (Algeria)
2 July 2022
20:00

Italy	2–1	Morocco
Raimondo 55', 63'	Report	Khalifi 90+3' (pen.)

Abdelkrim Kerroum Stadium, Sig
Referee: Jérémie Pignard (France)

=== Bronze medal match ===
4 July 2022
17:00

Turkey	2–4	Morocco
Biçer 15', 58'	Report	Anhari 45+1'; Raihani 47'; Maurer 73'; Sadik 86'

Miloud Hadefi Stadium, Bir El Djir
Referee: Bruno José Costa (Portugal)

=== Gold medal match ===
4 July 2022
20:45

France	1–0	Italy
Pirringuel 68'	Report

Miloud Hadefi Stadium, Bir El Djir
Attendance: 25,000 (official)
45,000
Referee: Lotfi Bekouassa (Algeria)

== Final standings ==
Pos	Team	Pld	W	D	L	GF	GA	GD	Pts	Final result
1st place, gold medalist(s)	France	5	4	1	0	8	3	+5	13	Gold medal
2nd place, silver medalist(s)	Italy	5	3	1	1	7	2	+5	10	Silver medal
3rd place, bronze medalist(s)	Morocco	5	2	1	2	8	6	+2	7	Bronze medal
4	Turkey	5	1	1	3	4	9	−5	4	Fourth place
5	Portugal	3	1	0	2	2	3	−1	3	Group stage
6	Algeria (H)	3	1	0	2	3	5	−2	3	Group stage
7	Greece	3	1	0	2	3	6	−3	3	Group stage
8	Spain	3	0	2	1	2	3	−1	2	Group stage

Source: Oran2022
(H) Hosts

== Goalscorers ==
There were 37 goals scored in 16 matches, for an average of 2.31 goals per match.

6 goals

- (Italy) Antonio Raimondo

4 goals

- (France) Amine Messoussa

3 goals

- (Turkey) Habib Biçer

2 goals

- (France) Ikia Dimi
- (Greece) Georgios Koutsias
- (Morocco) Yassine Khalifi
- (Morocco) Abdellah Raihani

1 goal

- (Algeria) Ivane Chegra
- (Algeria) Mehdi Puch-Herrantz
- (Algeria) Salah Eddine Zaoui
- (France) Badredine Bouanani
- (France) Lenny Pirringuel
- (Greece) Konstantinos Volakis
- (Italy) Luca D'Andrea
- (Morocco) Hamza Anhari
- (Morocco) Othmane Boukhres
- (Morocco) Aïman Maurer
- (Morocco) Omar Sadik
- (Portugal) Alves de Freitas
- (Portugal) Mariano Falé
- (Spain) Álex Valle Gómez
- (Spain) Álvaro Daniel Rodríguez Muñoz
- (Turkey) Ali Şahin Yılmaz
