= Gdyel =

- Commune and town

- Location within Algeria
- Coordinates: 35.782171°N 0.423746°W
- Country: Algeria
- Province: Oran Province
- District: Gdyel District

Area
  - Total: 36.22 sq mi (93.82 km^{2})

Population (2009)
  - Total: 39,129
- Time zone: UTC+1 (CET)

Gdyel (Arabic: قديل), former Saint-Cloud, is a town and commune in District Gdyel, Oran Province, Algeria, about 15 miles to the east of Oran. Under French rule, it was the centre of a wine-growing district and was called St. Cloud.

According to the 1998 census it has a population of 29 999.

When the Americans invaded Algeria in November 1942 (Operation Torch), the troops who landed at Beach Z, between Arzew and St. Leu (now called Bethioua) were held up for two days by fierce fighting at St. Cloud. Eventually, the town was simply by-passed by Major-General Terry de La Mesa Allen, which surprised the defenders of Oran, who quickly surrendered.
