= Aïn El Turk District =

Coordinates: 35.7408°N 0.7492°W

Aïn El Turk District دائرة عين الترك
- District
- Map of Algeria highlighting Oran Province

- Map of Oran Province highlighting Aïn El Turk District
- Country: Algeria
- Province: Oran
- District seat: Aïn El Turk

Area
  - Total: 162.76 km^{2} (62.84 sq mi)

Population (1998)
  - Total: 59,483
  - Density: 365.46/km^{2} (946.55/sq mi)
- Time zone: UTC+01 (CET)
- Municipalities: 4

Aïn El Turk is a district in Oran Province, Algeria, on the Mediterranean Sea. It was named after its capital, Aïn El Turk.

== Municipalities ==
The district is further divided into 4 municipalities:

- Aïn El Turk
- Mers El Kébir
- Bousfer
- El Ançor
