= Mers El Hadjadj Stadium =

Multi-use stadium in Algeria

- Interactive map of Mers El Hadjadj Stadium
- Full name: Mers El Hadjadj Communal Stadium
- Location: Mers El Hadjadj, Algeria
- Coordinates: 35.7890°N 0.1681°W
- Owner: APC of Mers El Hadjadj
- Capacity: 5.400
- Surface: Grass

Construction
- Opened: 2022

Tenant
- O. Mers El Hadjadj

The Mers El Hadjadj Stadium (Arabic: ملعب مرسى الحجاج) is a multi-use stadium in Mers El Hadjadj town in Oran District, Algeria. It is currently used mostly for football matches and holds 5,400 people. The stadium was used as one of the venues for the 2022 Mediterranean Games football tournament.

== History ==
The stadium construction began in 2020 as part of the organization of the city of Oran for the 2022 Mediterranean Games. The stadium was inaugurated in 2022 being one of the sites used for the football tournaments for these Mediterranean Games. It hosted three matches in the group stage.
