= Portus Magnus, Algeria =

Roman port and colony in Mauretania Caesariensis

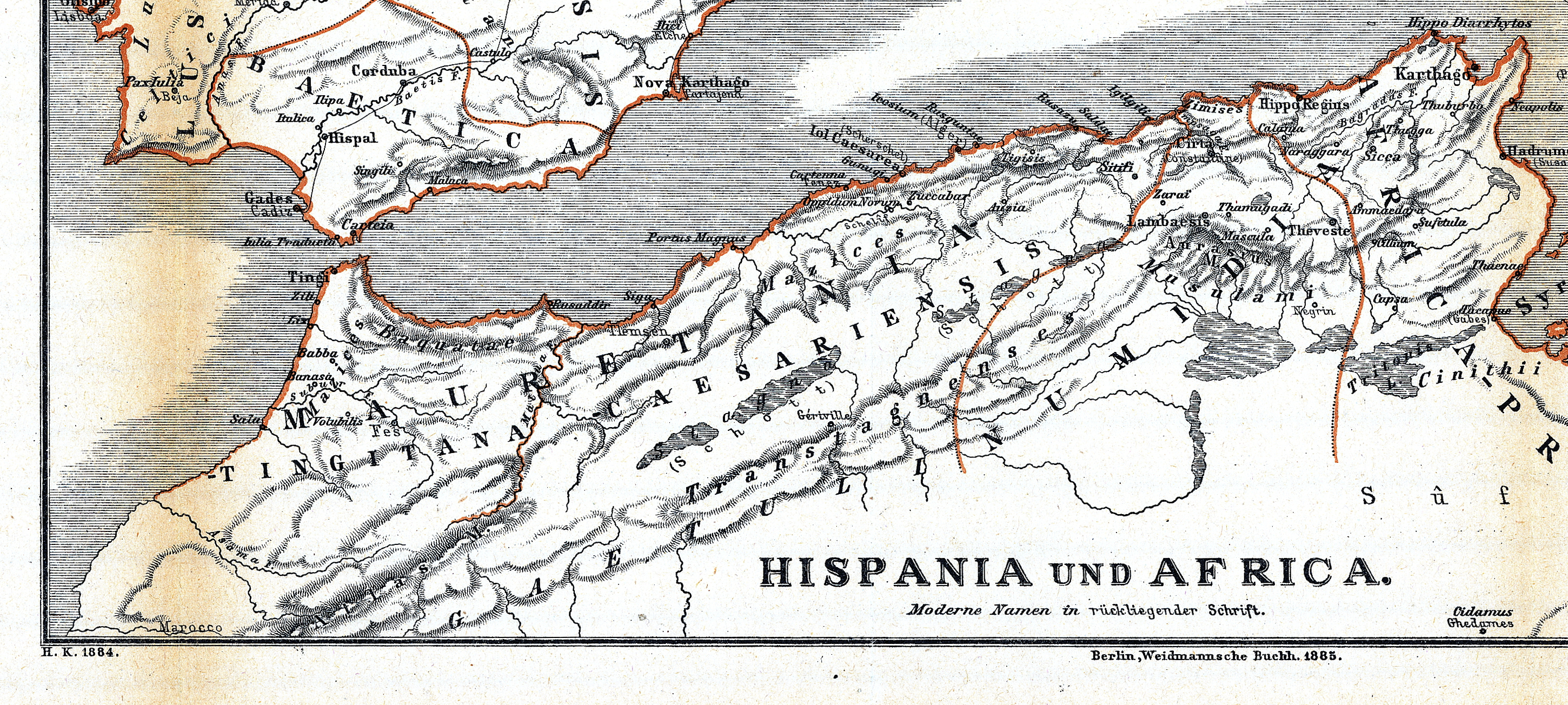
Excerpt from a German map in one of Mommsen's works, showing Portus Magnus on the coast of western Mauretania Caesariensis

Portus Magnus (Latin: "Great Port") was a Roman port and colony in western Mauretania Caesariensis near Portus Divinus. Its ruins are now under and around Bethioua in Algeria's Oran Province. In the early modern period, Bethioua still housed several notable Roman mosaics and other artwork, most of which have since been removed to the museum at the provincial capital Oran.

== History ==
Arzew's colonial French coat of arms, showing its conflation by the French with the actual remains of ancient Portus Magnus to its southwest at present-day Bethioua

The city is located in a ruins of the ancient Phoenicians of Carthage and stood on a hill overlooking the ancient port. The city was named Portus Magnus after coming the Romans. The inhabitants were mostly Roman citizens, whose main exports were grain and salt. The settlement covered approximately 36 hectares (89 acres), paved or leveled by landfills. In present Bethioua, there remain some walls and buildings, rainwater cisterns, bits of Roman streets, and a small forum (50 by 40 meters or 160 by 130 feet). Off one side of the forum was a small building with marble countertops and a statue. Behind this was a temple of unknown dedication and, about 120 meters (400 ft) west of the forum, there was another very large temple dedicated to Venus. The colonnades (porticus) and spa near some of the Roman villas probably constituted a palatial resort of the 3rd century. During their invasion of North Africa, the Vandals destroyed Portus Magnus in AD 429 or 430. There is some evidence of Byzantine Christian worship, showing some port activity continued after the area's 6th-century Byzantine reconquest, during which it was involved in repeated wars against local Berber kingdoms. The settlement was fully abandoned after the Islamic conquest of North Africa in the 7th century, the location of "Arzao" noted by El Bekri as only bearing the remains of an abandoned Roman port c. 1068.

The Almohads refounded the city and reopened the port in 1162 under the name Bethioua. The French later conflated its history with their own larger nearby settlement at Arzew.

== See also ==
- Mauretania Caesariensis
- Arzew & Bethioua
