= Hassi Mefsoukh =

Coordinates: 35°47′N 0°20′W

- Commune and town
- Interactive map of Hassi Mefsoukh
- Country: Algeria
- Province: Oran Province
- District: Gdyel District

Population (1998)
  - Total: 7,656
- Time zone: UTC+1 (CET)

Hassi Mefsoukh is a town and commune in Oran Province, Algeria. According to the 1998 census it has a population of 7656.
