= Bousfer =

Bousfer, Oran Province بوسفر
- Municipality
- Commune of Bousfer
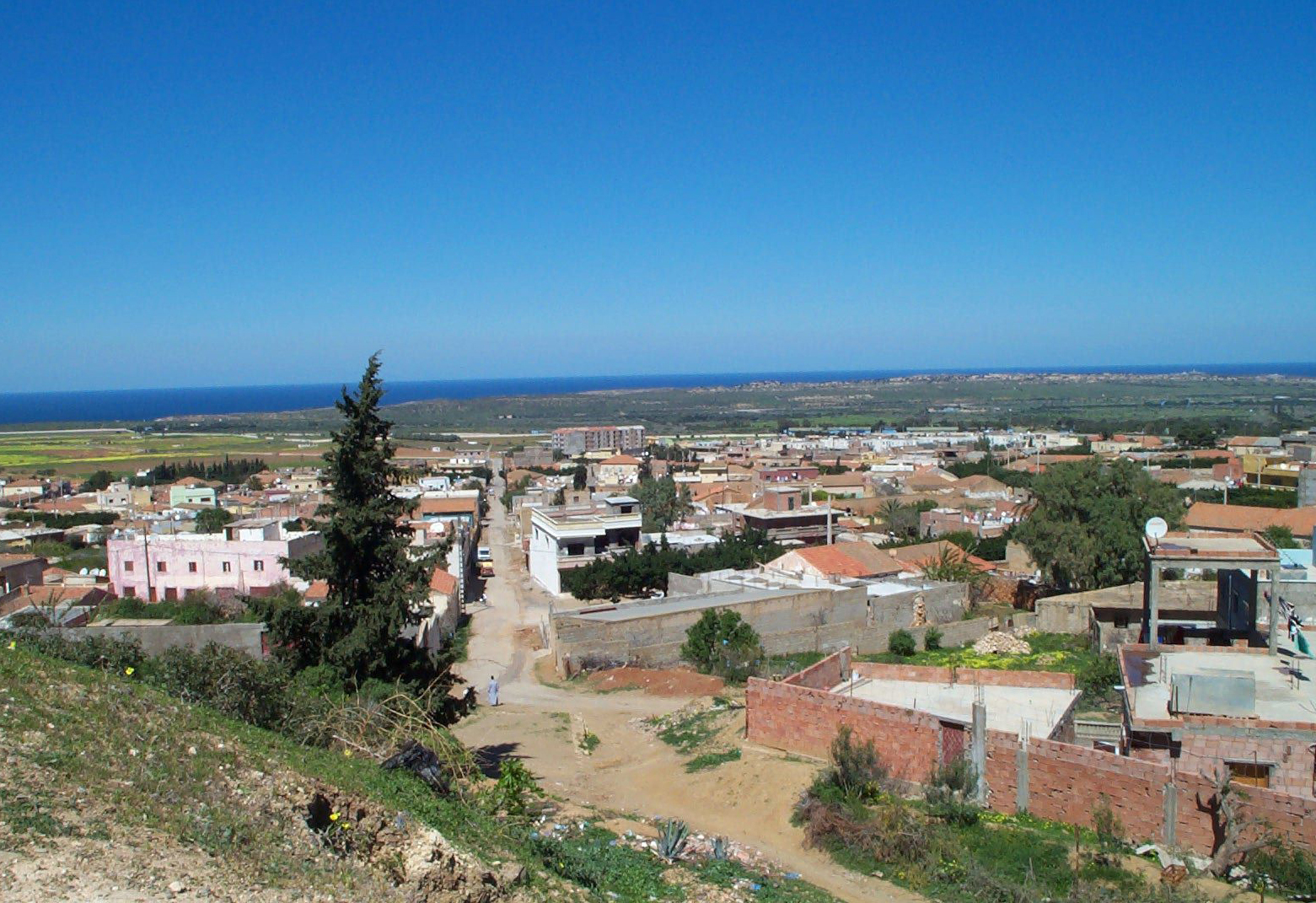

- Location of Bousfer within Oran Province

- Location of Bousfer within Algeria
- Coordinates: 35°42′39″N 0°48′38″W
- Country: Algeria
- Province: Oran
- District: Ain el-Turck

Government
  - PMA Seats: 6
- Elevation: 286 m (938 ft)

Population (2007)
  - Total: 13,450
- Time zone: UTC+01 (CET)
- Postal code: 92121
- ONS code: 3114

Bousfer (formerly known as Aïn-Boucefar) is a municipality in Oran province under Ain el-Turck district.

== History ==
The village was established in 1850 and built in full function joint in 1863, located in the opposite of the naval base of Mers el-Kebir. The hamlet of Andalusians (so named by mistake) was diverted from the town in 1893 after the creation of the municipality of El Ancor – its name is actually Al-Andalous because on the shores of the Gulf between Cape Falcon north-east and the Cape Lindl the northwest, the first Moors expelled from Andalusia landed there.

Map showing the location of Bousfer

At the time of independence, the 2nd Republic sought to protect the naval base. It is grouped September 13, 1962 in a camp that takes the name "Camp Segrétain". The implementation is provided free of any construction on the location of vines at the bottom of a basin bounded on the north by dunes that separates the sea nearby. The Legionnaires start to work and build first tent camp, then the need to construct buildings in hard group, is soon to feel the first rains.

== Notable people ==
- General Edmond Jouhaud was born there in 1905. He had a distinguished career in the Air Force before participating in the Algiers putsch in April 1961 which earned him a death sentence. - 1967: he left prison in December of Tulle, and benefits from the amnesty in July 1968.

== Pictures of the village ==
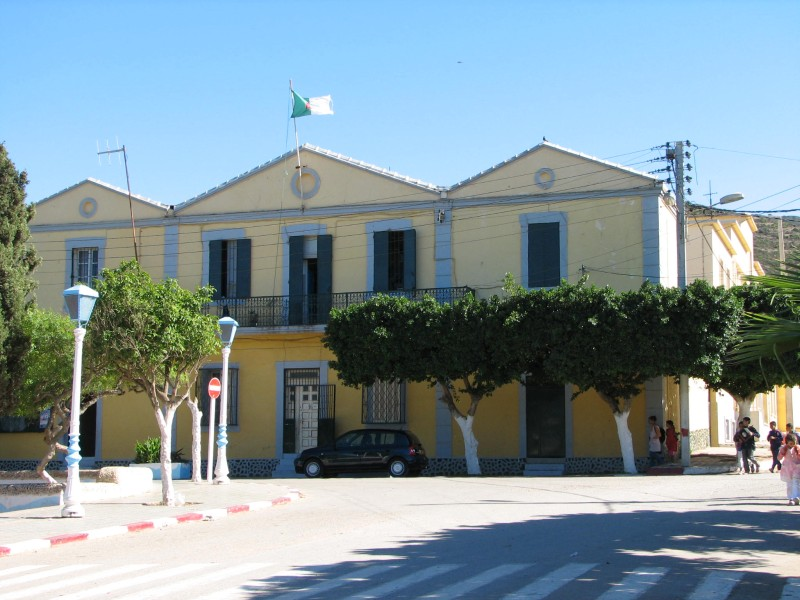
The Town Hall

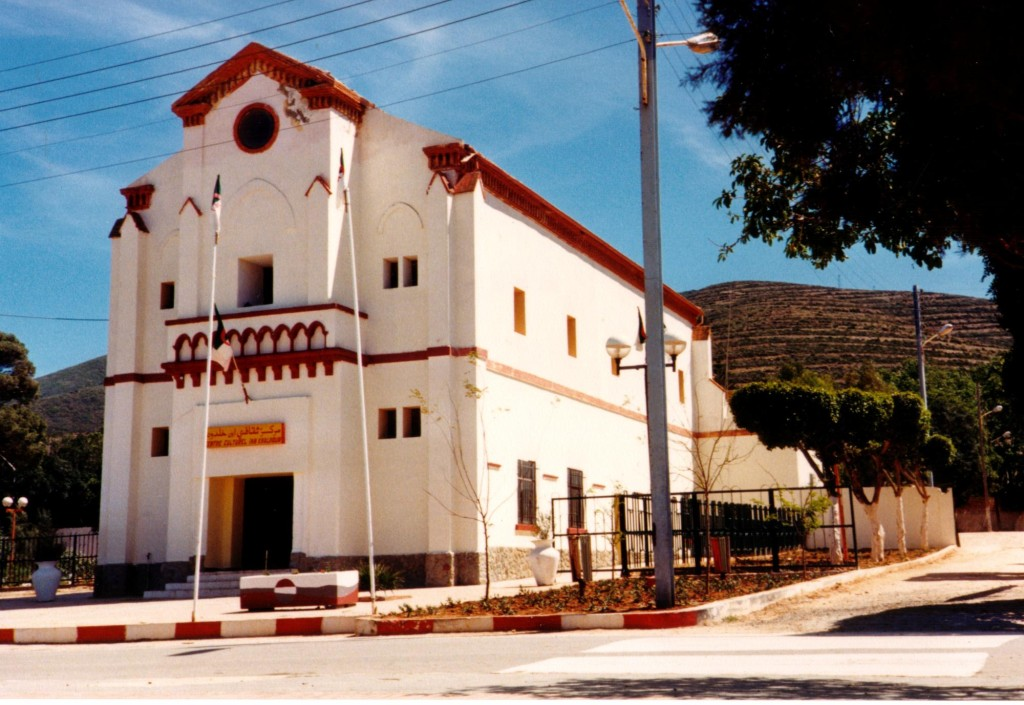
The old church (now a cultural center)
