= Luca D'Andrea =

Italian footballer (born 2004)

Personal information
- Date of birth: 6 September 2004 (age 22)
- Place of birth: Naples, Italy
- Height: 1.72 m (5 ft 8 in)
- Positions: Attacking midfielder; right winger

Team information
- Current team: Cesena (on loan from Sassuolo)
- Number: 16

Youth career
- Ponticelli
- Mariano Keller
- –2018: Scuola Calcio Azzurri
- 2018–2022: SPAL
- 2022: Sassuolo

Senior career*
Years	Team	Apps	(Gls)
2022–	Sassuolo	6	(0)
2023–2024	→ Catanzaro (loan)	23	(0)
2025	→ Brescia (loan)	9	(0)
2025–2026	→ Avellino (loan)	4	(0)
2026–	→ Cesena (loan)	0	(0)

International career^{‡}
2021–2022	Italy U18	8	(2)
2022–2023	Italy U19	10	(4)
2023–2024	Italy U20	5	(0)
Medal record
Men's football
Representing Italy
UEFA European Under-19 Championship
Winner	2023 Malta
Mediterranean Games
Runner-up	Oran 2022	U-18 Team
- * Club domestic league appearances and goals as of 23 August 2026 ‡ National team caps and goals as of 21 March 2024

Luca D'Andrea (born 6 September 2004) is an Italian professional footballer who plays as an attacking midfielder or a right winger for Serie B club Cesena, on loan from Sassuolo.

== Club career ==
Born in Naples, D'Andrea started playing football at the grassroots schools Ponticelli, Mariano Keller and Azzurri, before entering SPAL's youth sector in 2018, where he reached the semi-finals of the national under-17 championship in 2021. Then, in January 2022, he joined Sassuolo, signing his first professional deal in the process.

In the summer of the same year, he was officially promoted to the first team by manager Alessio Dionisi: he subsequently made his professional debut on 17 September, starting the Serie A match against Torino, which ended in a 1–0 win for his side. In January 2023, he extended his contract with Sassuolo until 2027.

=== Loan to Catanzaro ===
On 1 August of the same year, D'Andrea joined newly promoted Serie B club Catanzaro on a season-long loan. On 27 August, having come on as a substitute in the second half of a league match against Ternana, he gained a penalty kick for his side in the 89th minute, which was scored by Jari Vandeputte and helped Catanzaro obtain a 2–1 win.

=== Loan to Brescia ===
On 1 February 2025, D'Andrea moved on loan to Brescia, with an option to buy.

=== Loan to Avellino ===
On 8 July 2025, D'Andrea was loaned by Avellino, with an option to buy.

== International career ==
D'Andrea has represented Italy at several youth international levels, having featured for the under-18 and under-19 national teams.

He was included in the under-18 squad that took part in the 2022 Mediterranean Games in Oran, as the Azzurrini eventually won the silver medal after losing to France (1–0) in the tournament's final match.

In June 2023, he was included in the Italian squad for the UEFA European Under-19 Championship in Malta, where the Azzurrini eventually won their second continental title.

== Style of play ==
D'Andrea is a left-footed forward, who can play either as an attacking midfielder or an inverted winger on the right side. A diminutive player, he has been mainly regarded for key skills such as technique, ball control, speed, dribbling and shooting, as well as his work rate.

== Career statistics ==
As of match played 27 August 2023

Appearances and goals by club, season and competition
Club	Season	League			National cup		Continental		Total	
Club	Season	Division	Apps	Goals	Apps	Goals	Apps	Goals	Apps	Goals
Sassuolo	2022–23	Serie A	5	0	0	0	0	0	5	0
Catanzaro	2023–24	Serie B	1	0	2	0	0	0	3	0
Career total			6	0	2	0	0	0	8	0

== Honours ==
Italy U19

- UEFA European Under-19 Championship: 2023
