= Aïn Bya =

Aïn Bya عين البية
- Commune and town
- Location of Aïn Bya within Oran Province

- Location of Aïn Bya within Algeria
- Coordinates: 35.816667°N 0.283333°W
- Country: Algeria
- Province: Oran Province
- District: Bethioua District

Area
  - Total: 13.96 sq mi (36.15 km^{2})

Population (2009)
  - Total: 32,611
- Time zone: UTC+1 (CET)

Aïn Bya is a town and commune in Oran Province, Algeria. According to the 1998 census, it has a population of 26,253.
