= Boufatis =

Coordinates: 35°41′N 0°25′W

Boufatis Saint Louis
- Commune and town
- Country: Algeria
- Province: Oran Province
- District: Oued Tlélat District

Population (1998)
  - Total: 9,906
- Time zone: UTC+1 (CET)

Boufatis is a town and commune in Oran Province, Algeria. According to the 1998 census it has a population of 9906.
