= Aïn El Kerma =

Aïn El Kerma عين الكرمة
- Commune and town
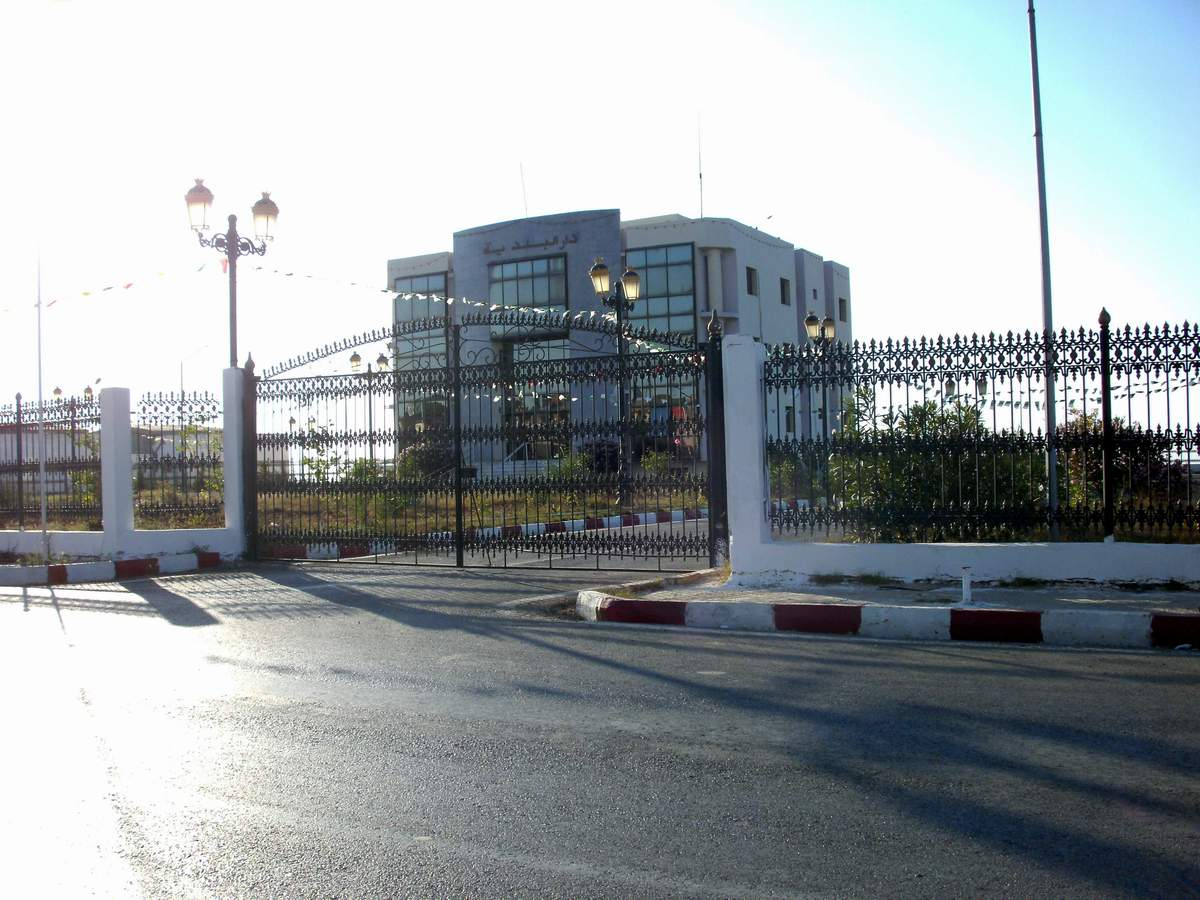

- Location within Algeria
- Coordinates: 35.648979°N 0.975702°W
- Country: Algeria
- Province: Oran Province
- District: Boutlélis District

Area
  - Total: 41.67 sq mi (107.92 km^{2})

Population (2009)
  - Total: 7,513
- Time zone: UTC+1 (CET)

Aïn El Kerma is a town and commune in Oran Province, Algeria.
