= Clément Rodier =

French missionary brother and botanist

Marie-Clément Rodier, C.S.Sp. (French pronunciation: [maʁiklemɑ̃ ʁɔdje]; born Vital Rodier; 1839–1904) was a French missionary brother in Algeria. He is credited with creating the clementine variety of mandarin orange in 1902.

== Biography ==
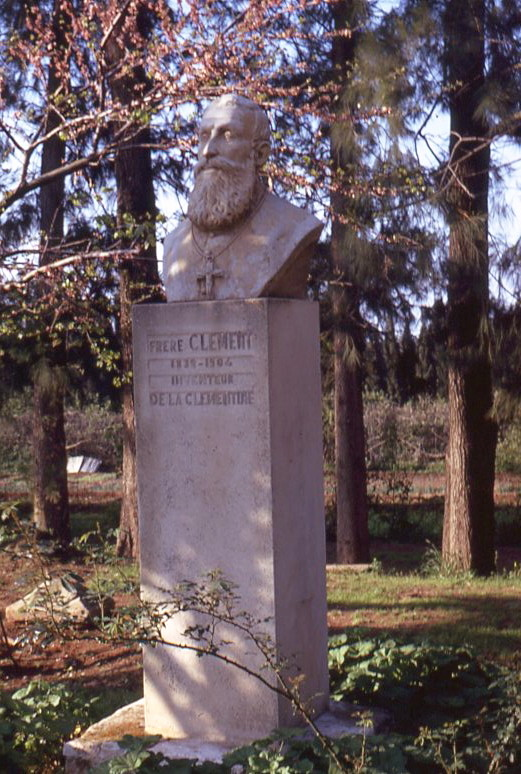
Brother Clément was buried in Misserghin near Oran.

Rodier was born 25 May 1839 as Vital Rodier in Malvieille, near to Chambon-sur-Dolore, France. Originally a member of the Brothers of the Annunciation at Misserghin in Algeria, he helped to run an orphanage. Brother Marie-Clément worked with the orphanage's citrus trees, and made grafts from an uncultivated tree that had grown among some thorn bushes in the orchard. This graft resulted in the clementine, which was named in honor of its creator.

Brother Marie-Clément's new variety was "a species of mandarin, which won the admiration of connoisseurs and which the orphans christened the Clementine. It was neither a mandarin tree nor an orange tree. Its fruit was redder than a mandarin and had a delicious taste and, moreover, it had no pith".

Brother Marie-Clément became a brother in the Congregation of the Holy Spirit after the Brothers of the Annunciation were authorized to join that order in 1903. He died in 1904.

In 2010, a building on the campus of Duquesne University in Pittsburgh, Pennsylvania was named Clement Hall in honor of Brother Marie-Clément.
