= Chérif Sid Cara =

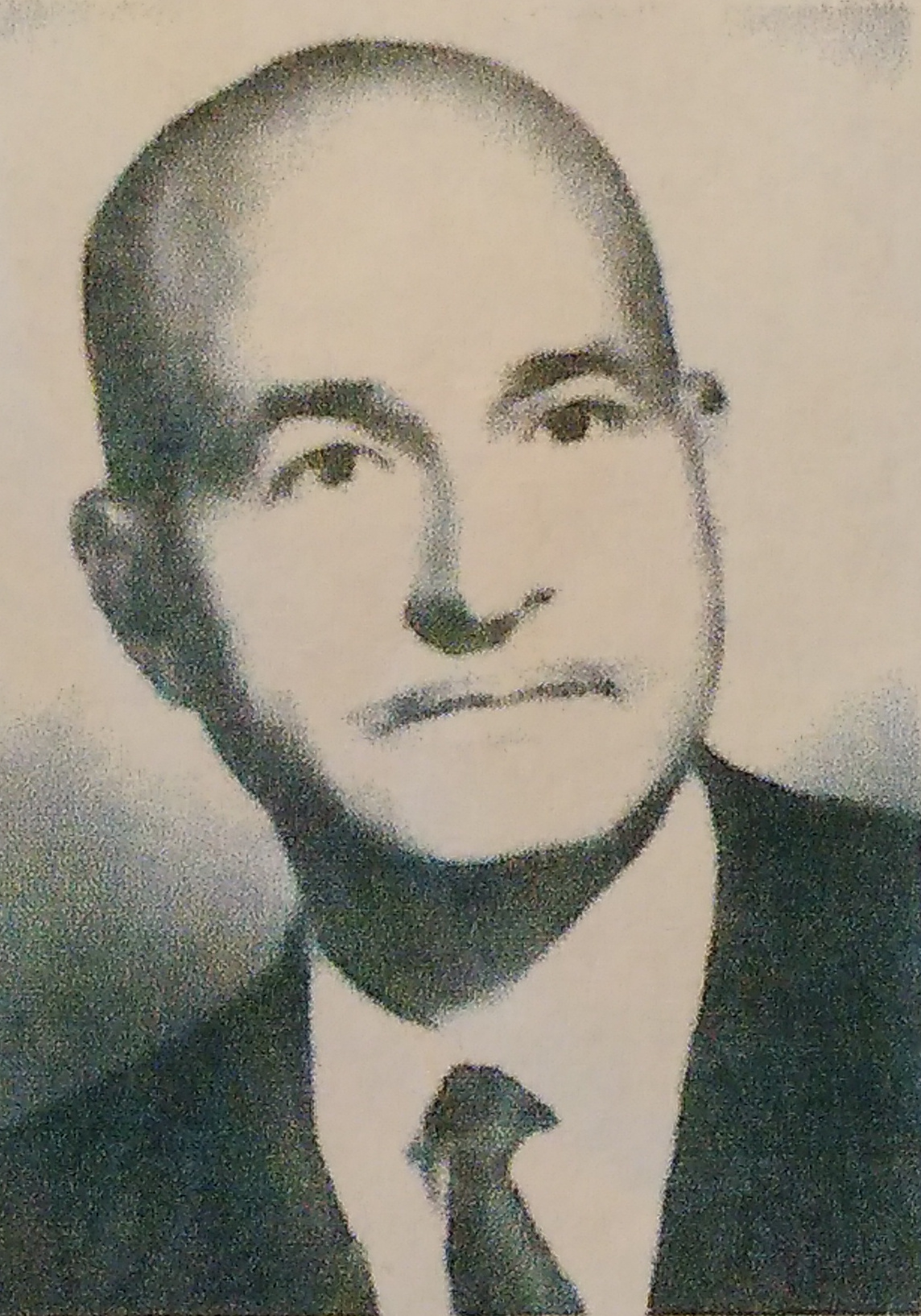
Chérif Sid Cara

Dr. Chérif Sid-Cara or Chérif Sidkara (26 November 1902, in Mila, Algeria - 6 March 1999, Grenoble, France) was an Algerian medical doctor and a politician in the French Fourth Republic. He was one of the leading Muslim political figures in favour of France during the Algerian War.

== Early life and education ==
Sid-Cara was born in Mila on November 26, 1902, into a family of Turkish origin. He attended the lycée in Constantine and then studied medicine in Algiers, Bordeaux, and Paris. Thereafter, he received his Doctorate in Medicine in 1931, and became a certified doctor in the Merchant Marines (Bordeaux) having earned his diplomas in Paris.

== Politics ==
In 1935 Sid-Cara was elected in the municipal elections of Oran and became an assistant in the mayor’s office. Thereafter, in 1946, he was elected senator under the "Démocratique d’Union Franco-Musulmane"; he was re-elected for this post in 1948 and then again in 1952. Moreover, he was elected to the Assemblée Nationale as député of Oran in 1951. By 1955 Sid-Cara was elected General Council of the department of Oran and was elected President of the department in April 1956. Moreover, in 1957 and 1958, he also served as Secretary of State of Algeria in the cabinets of Maurice Bourgès-Maunoury and Félix Gaillard.

In May 1958 Sid-Cara became co-President of the Comité de Salut Publique where he worked for free access of Algerians to France. During the November 1958 elections, his party, the "Union pour le Renouveau de l’Algérie Française", which sought to keep Algeria as a part of the French Republic, was elected with 84% of the votes. In the Assemblée Nationale, he helped organize a group of representatives from Algeria and the Sahara which became known as "Unité de la République" and renamed the "Regroupement National pour l’Unité de la République" in December 1960.

Sid-Cara was also elected mayor of Misserghin and remained in his post until Algeria obtained its independence in 1962.

== Personal life ==
Sid-Cara's sister, Nafissa Sid Cara, was also a politician and the first Muslim woman to serve in French government.

He died on March 6, 1999, in Grenoble.
