= Gdyel District =

Coordinates: 35.7833°N 0.4333°W

Gdyel District دائرة قديل
- District
- Map of Algeria highlighting Oran Province

- Map of Oran Province highlighting Gdyel District
- Country: Algeria
- Province: Oran
- District seat: Gdyel

Area
  - Total: 188.78 km^{2} (72.89 sq mi)

Population (1998)
  - Total: 52,221
  - Density: 276.62/km^{2} (716.45/sq mi)
- Time zone: UTC+01 (CET)
- Municipalities: 3

Gdyel is a district in Oran Province, Algeria. It was named after its capital, Gdyel, on the Mediterranean Sea.

== Municipalities ==
The district is further divided into 3 municipalities:

- Gdyel
- Hassi Mefsoukh
- Ben Freha
