= Boutlélis =

Boutlélis بوتليليس Boutlelis
- Commune and town
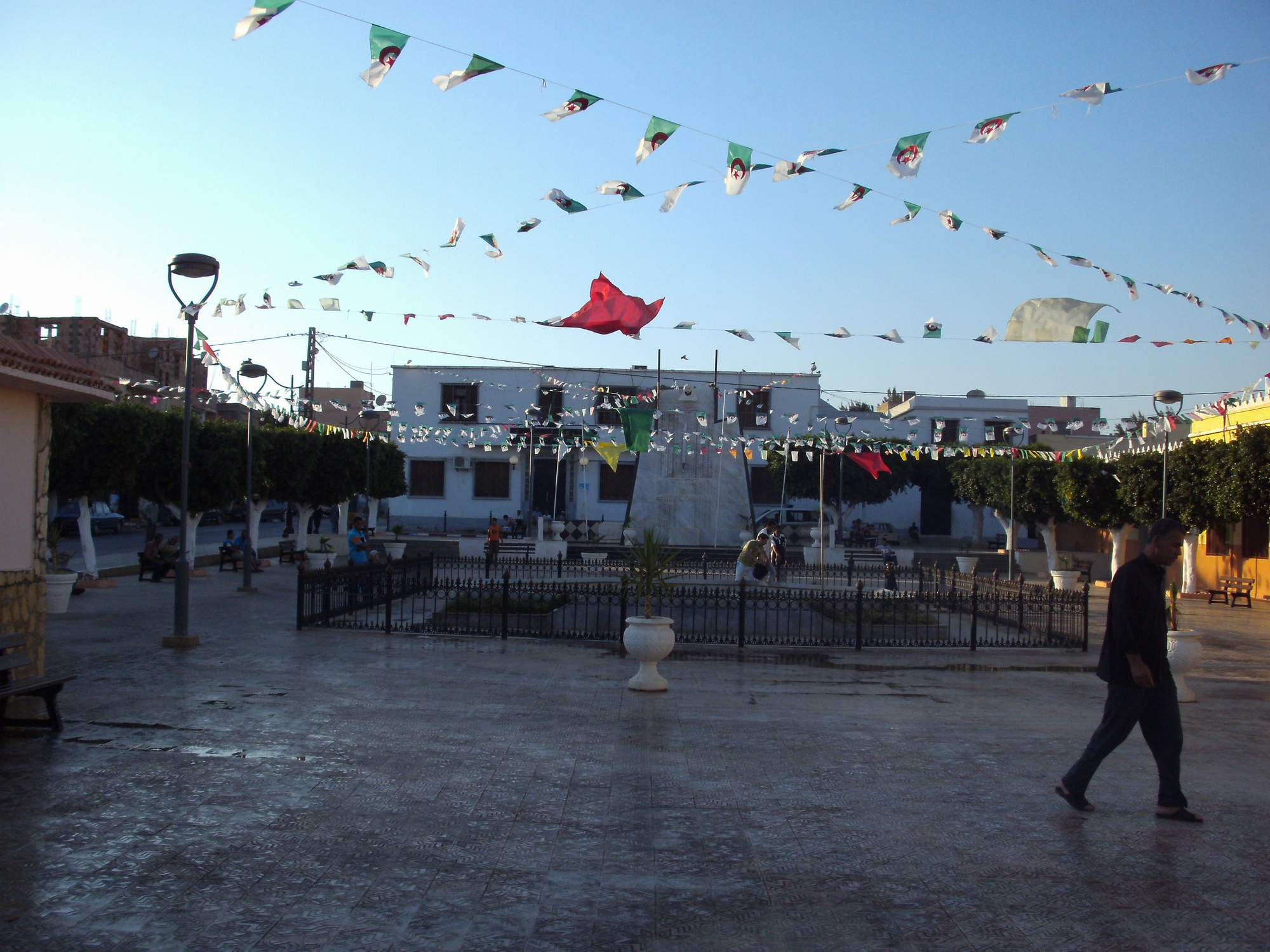

- Location within Algeria
- Coordinates: 35.573°N 0.900°W
- Country: Algeria
- Province: Oran Province
- District: Boutlélis District

Area
  - Total: 52.50 sq mi (135.97 km^{2})

Population (2009)
  - Total: 23,920
- Time zone: UTC+1 (CET)

Boutlélis is a town and commune in Oran Province, Algeria. According to the 1998 census it has a population of 17599.
