= Sidi Chami =

Coordinates: 35°40′N 0°31′W

Sidi Elchahmi
- Commune and town
- Country: Algeria
- Province: Oran Province
- District: Es Sénia District

Population (1998)
  - Total: 58,857
- Time zone: UTC+1 (CET)

Sidi Elchahmi is a town and commune in Oran Province, Algeria. In 1998, it has a population of 58,857.
