= Oued Tlélat District =

Coordinates: 35.5500°N 0.4500°W

Oued Tlélat District دائرة وادي تليلات
- District
- Map of Oran Province highlighting Oued Tlélat District
- Country: Algeria
- Province: Oran
- District seat: Oued Tlélat

Area
  - Total: 422.43 km^{2} (163.10 sq mi)

Population (1998)
  - Total: 37,062
  - Density: 87.735/km^{2} (227.23/sq mi)
- Time zone: UTC+01 (CET)
- Municipalities: 4

Oued Tlélat is a district (daïra) in Oran Province, Algeria. It is one of the two landlocked districts of the province. It was named after its capital, Oued Tlélat.

== Municipalities ==
The district is further divided into 4 municipalities:

- Oued Tlélat
- Rydalkou
- Boufatis
- Tafraoui
