= Bethioua District =

Coordinates: 35.8047°N 0.2596°W

Bethioua District دائرة بطيوة
- District
- Map of Algeria highlighting Oran Province

- Map of Oran Province highlighting Bethioua District
- Country: Algeria
- Province: Oran
- District seat: Bethioua

Area
  - Total: 197.01 km^{2} (76.07 sq mi)

Population (1998)
  - Total: 51,275
  - Density: 260.27/km^{2} (674.09/sq mi)
- Time zone: UTC+01 (CET)
- Municipalities: 3

Bethioua is a district in Oran Province, Algeria, on the Mediterranean Sea. It was named after its capital, Bethioua.

== Municipalities ==
The district is further divided into 3 municipalities:

- Bethioua
- Mers El Hadjadj
- Aïn Bya
