= Boutlélis District =

Coordinates: 35.5730°N 0.8999°W

Boutlélis District دائرة بوتليليس
- District
- Map of Algeria highlighting Oran Province

- Map of Oran Province highlighting Boutlélis District
- Country: Algeria
- Province: Oran
- District seat: Boutlélis

Area
  - Total: 672.17 km^{2} (259.53 sq mi)

Population (1998)
  - Total: 42,668
  - Density: 63.478/km^{2} (164.41/sq mi)
- Time zone: UTC+01 (CET)
- Municipalities: 3

Boutlélis is a district (daïra) in Oran Province, Algeria, on the Mediterranean Sea. It was named after its capital, Boutlélis.

== Municipalities ==
The district is further divided into 3 municipalities (communes):

- Boutlélis
- Aïn El Kerma
- Misserghin
