= El Braya =

Coordinates: 35°38′N 0°31′W

- Commune and town
- Country: Algeria
- Province: Oran Province
- District: Oued Tlélat District

Population (1998)
  - Total: 3,879
- Time zone: UTC+1 (CET)

El Braya is a town and commune in Oran Province, Algeria. According to the 1998 census it has a population of 3879.
