= Tafraoui =

Tafraoui بلدية طفراوي
- Municipality
- Commune of Tafraoui
- Location of Tafraoui within Oran Province

- Location of Tafraoui within Algeria
- Coordinates: 35°29′N 0°31′W
- Country: Algeria
- Province: Oran
- District: Oued Tlélat

Government
  - PMA Seats: 7

Area
  - Total: 182 km^{2} (70 sq mi)
- Elevation: 173 m (568 ft)

Population (2006)
  - Total: 11,600
  - Density: 63.7/km^{2} (165/sq mi)
- Time zone: UTC+01 (CET)
- Postal code: 31160
- ONS code: 3112

Tafraoui is a commune of Algeria in Oran Province close to the city of Oran. There is an airport with the same name. Capturing Oran Tafraoui Airport was a part of Operation Torch in World War II.
