= Bir El Djir District =

Coordinates: 35.7368°N 0.5541°W

Bir El Djir District دائرة بئر الجير
- District
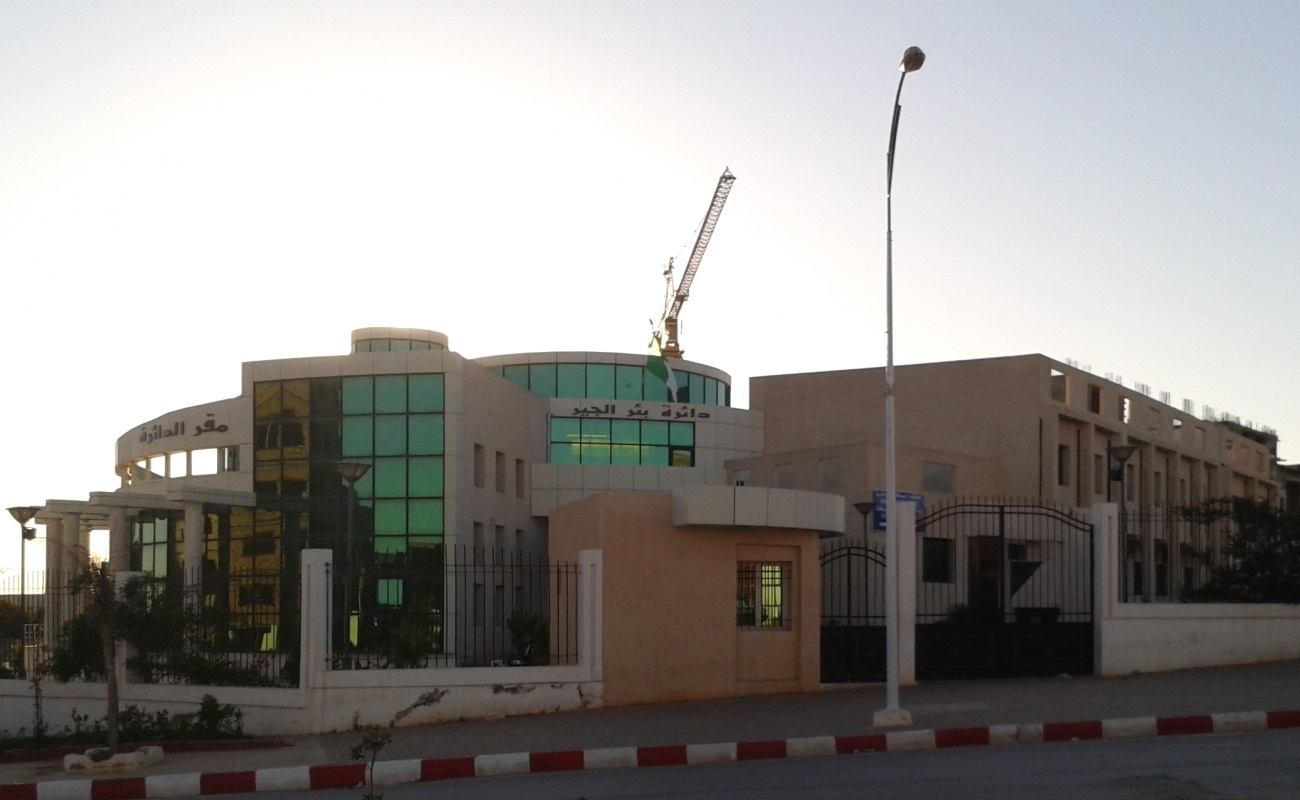

- Map of Algeria highlighting Oran Province

- Map of Oran Province highlighting Bir El Djir District
- Country: Algeria
- Province: Oran
- District seat: Bir El Djir

Area
  - Total: 101.7 km^{2} (39.3 sq mi)

Population (1998)
  - Total: 127,113
  - Density: 1,250/km^{2} (3,237/sq mi)
- Time zone: UTC+01 (CET)
- Municipalities: 3

Bir El Djir is a district in Oran Province, Algeria, on the Mediterranean Sea. It was named after its capital, Bir El Djir.

== Municipalities ==
The district is further divided into 3 municipalities:

- Bir El Djir
- Hassi Bounif
- Hassi Ben Okba
