= Nafissa Sid Cara =

French politician

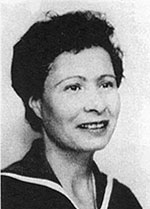
Portrait of former MP Nafissa Sid Cara

Nafissa Sid-Cara or Nafissa Sidkara (18 April 1910, in El Eulma, Algeria - 1 January 2002, Paris, France) was a French politician. Sid-Cara was the first female minister to serve in the French Fifth Republic as well as the first ever Algerian origin and Muslim woman to serve as a minister in a French government. She was appointed Secretary of State in charge of social affairs in Algeria under Prime Minister Michel Debré in 1959–62. This was the first time a woman was appointed into a French government since 1937.

== Personal life ==
Sid-Cara's family were Algerians of Turkish origin; her brother, Chérif Sid Cara was also a French politician.
