= Ben Freha =

Ben Freha بن فريحة
- Commune and town
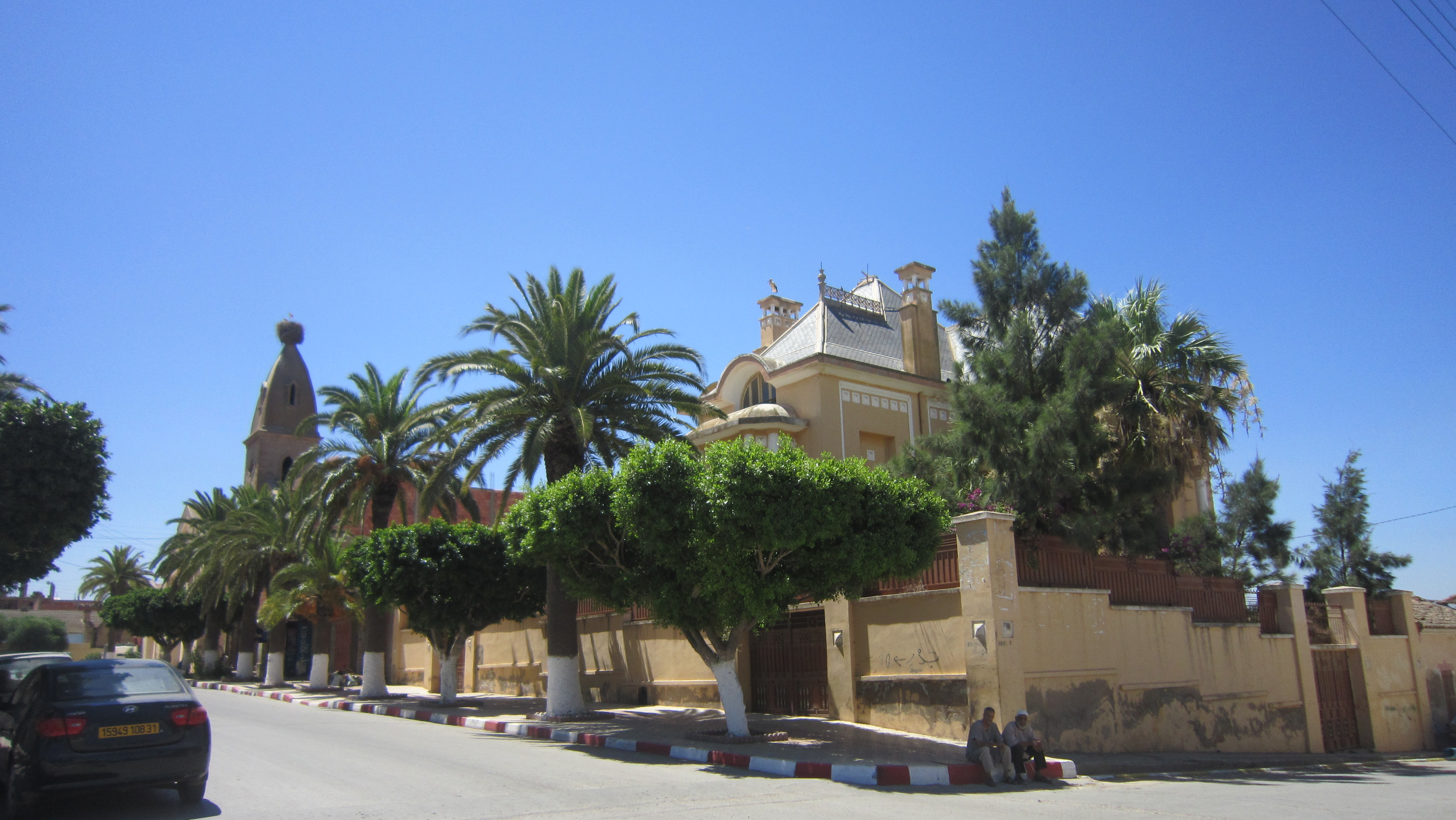

- Location within Algeria
- Country: Algeria
- Province: Oran Province
- District: Gdyel District

Population (1998)
  - Total: 14,565
- Time zone: UTC+1 (CET)

Ben Freha (Arabic: بن فريحة) is a town and commune in Oran Province, Algeria. According to the 1998 census it has a population of 14565.
