= Es Sénia District =

Coordinates: 35.6478°N 0.6239°W

Es Sénia District دائرة السانية
- District
- Map of Algeria highlighting Oran Province.

- Map of Oran Province highlighting Es Sénia District
- Country: Algeria
- Province: Oran
- District seat: Es Sénia

Area
  - Total: 181.56 km^{2} (70.10 sq mi)

Population (2008)
  - Total: 96,928
  - Density: 533.86/km^{2} (1,382.7/sq mi)
- Time zone: UTC+01 (CET)
- Municipalities: 3

Es Sénia is a district in Oran Province, Algeria. It was named after its capital, Es Sénia.

== Demographics ==
In 2008 the district had a population of 96,928.

== Municipalities ==
The district is further divided into 3 municipalities:

- Es Sénia
- El Kerma
- Sidi Chami
