= El Kerma =

Coordinates: 35°37′N 0°34′W

- Commune and town
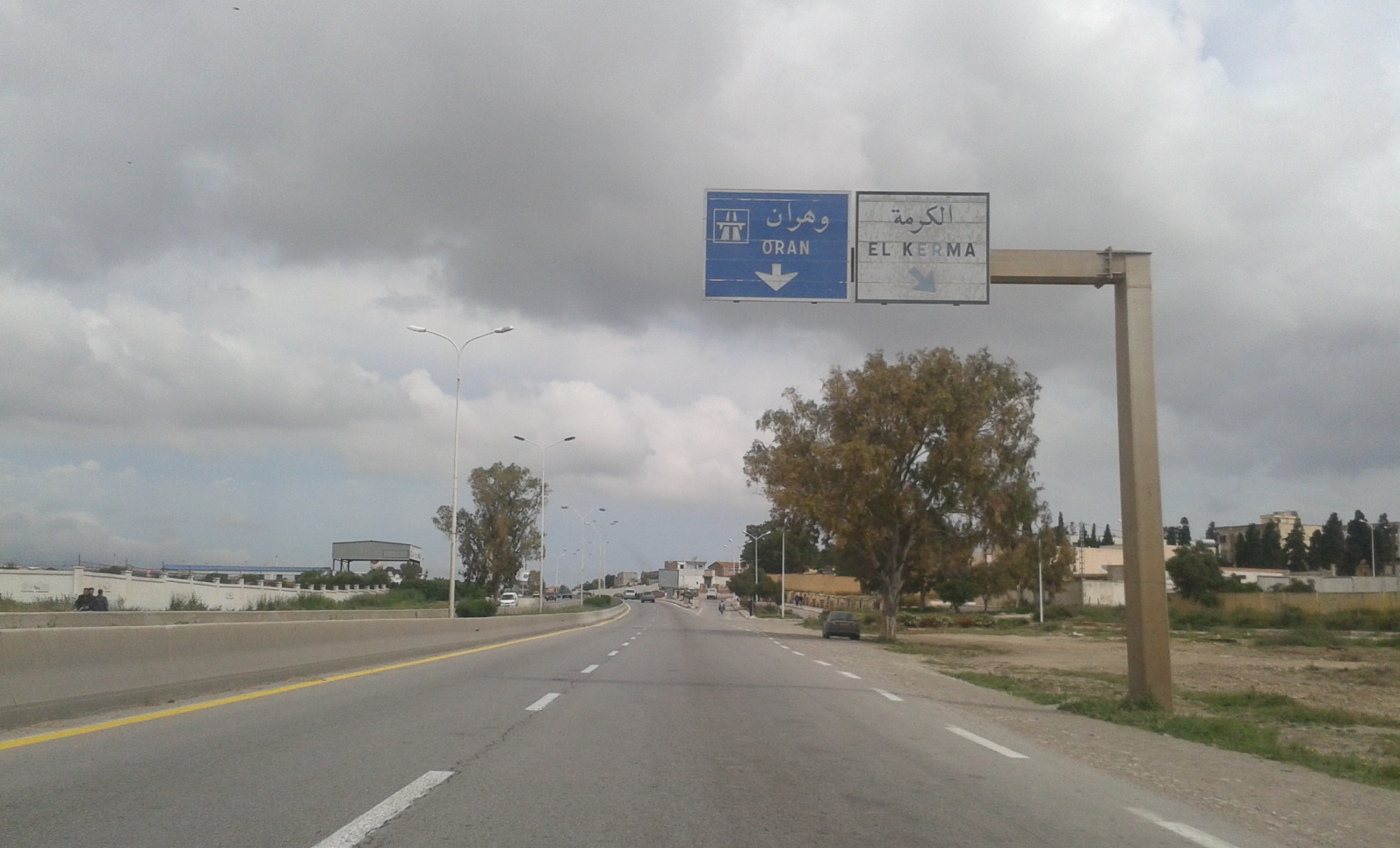

- Country: Algeria
- Province: Oran Province
- District: Es Sénia District

Population (1998)
  - Total: 13,637
- Time zone: UTC+1 (CET)

El Kerma is a town and commune in Oran Province, Algeria. According to the 1998 census it has a population of 13,637.
