= Aïn El Turk =

City in Oran province, Algeria

Ain el-Turck عين الترك
- Town
- Ain el-Turck
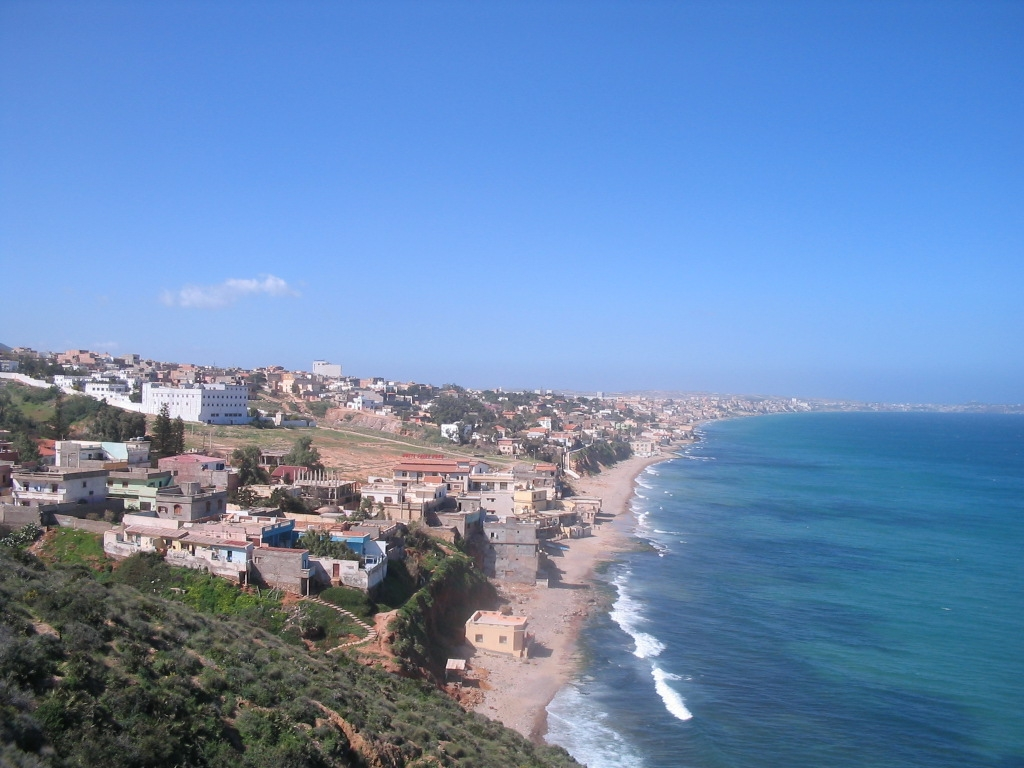
- Beaches of Aïn El Turk.

- Location within Algeria
- Coordinates: 35°44′27″N 0°44′57″W
- Country: Algeria
- Province: Oran
- District: Aïn El Turk
- Elevation: 272 m (892 ft)

Population (2008)
  - Total: 37,010
- Cap Falcon Lighthouse
- Coordinates: 35°46′15.57″N 0°48′2.59″W
- Constructed: 1868
- Foundation: stone base
- Construction: stone tower
- Height: 28.70 metres (94.2 ft)
- Shape: octagonal prism tower with balcony and lantern
- Markings: white tower, dark green lantern
- Operator: Office Nationale de Signalisation Maritime
- Focal height: 106 metres (348 ft)
- Light source: main power
- Intensity: 1,000 W
- Range: 29 nautical miles (54 km; 33 mi)
- Characteristic: Fl (4) W 25s.

Ain El Turk (Arabic: عين الترك, lit. 'Spring of the Turks', Tamazight: ⵄⵉⵏ ⴻⵜⵓⵔⴽ, romanized: Ɛin Eturk) is the capital of Ain el-Turck District. It is located about fifteen kilometers from Oran in the north-west of Algeria. The district contains nine municipalities. It now hosts an important seaside resort.

== Geography ==
Ain El Turk is located 15 kilometers northeast of Oran and Mers El Kébir. It is settled along the Mediterranean Sea. The bay of the town spans over a length of approximaotely 8 kilometers between Cape Falcon in the northwest and the northern tip of Mers El Kébir in the northeast. The town borders Misserghin in the south, Bousfer to the east, the Mediterranean Sea to the north, and Mers El Kébir to the east.

=== Climate ===
The climate of Ain El Turk is warm and temperate. In the summer, there is less rain than there is in the winter. The average temperature is 17.9 °C and the average annual precipitation never exceeds 400 mm.

Climate data for Ain El Turk
Month	Jan	Feb	Mar	Apr	May	Jun	Jul	Aug	Sep	Oct	Nov	Dec	Year
Mean daily maximum °C (°F)	16 (61)	17 (62)	18 (65)	21 (69)	23 (73)	25 (77)	28 (82)	29 (84)	27 (80)	23 (74)	19 (67)	17 (62)	22 (71)
Mean daily minimum °C (°F)	9 (48)	10 (50)	11 (52)	13 (55)	16 (60)	18 (65)	21 (70)	22 (72)	20 (68)	16 (61)	13 (55)	9 (49)	15 (59)
Average precipitation mm (inches)	71 (2.8)	53 (2.1)	36 (1.4)	33 (1.3)	20 (0.8)	7.6 (0.3)	0 (0)	2.5 (0.1)	15 (0.6)	43 (1.7)	46 (1.8)	66 (2.6)	390 (15.5)
Source: Weatherbase

== History ==
Ain El Turk served as a landing point for the Regency of Algiers for when they came to besiege Spanish-occupied Oran. The locality of Ain El Turk was established after a decree on 11 August, 1850. This prescribed the creation of an urban center in the Eurfa plain. The territory of the municipality was 2,650 hectares, 25 acres, and 44 centiares.

After 1850, the coast surrounding Ain El Turk was heavily urbanized. Three sites were established in the area:

- Trouville in 1900;
- Bouisseville in 1905 (named after a certain Godefroy Bousisse, the owner of the locality);
- Saint Roch in 1912.

Under French Algerian rule, the area was established as an overseas collectivity by a decree signed on 23 March, 1864; this was enlarged in 1899. The commune remained in the province of Oran in 1956. Following Algerian independence, the town underwent uncontrolled urbanization. The town was extended from Cape Falcon to Mers El Kébir. This bidirectional sprawl was particularly due to the physical, agricultural, and military constraints of the site, which hinder expansion into the south.

== See also ==
- List of lighthouses in Algeria
