= Hassi Bounif =

Hassi Bounif حاسي بونيف
- Commune and town

- Location within Algeria
- Coordinates: 35.70°N 0.50°W
- Country: Algeria
- Province: Oran Province
- District: Bir El Djir District

Area
  - Total: 12.27 sq mi (31.77 km^{2})

Population (2009)
  - Total: 63,581
- Time zone: UTC+1 (CET)

Hassi Bounif (Arabic : حاسيْ بُونِيف ) is a town and commune in Oran Province, Algeria. It is a south eastern suburb of Oran. According to the 1998 census it has a population of 44,649.
