= Bethioua =

Bethioua بطيوة
- Commune and town

- Location within Algeria
- Coordinates: 35.80°N 0.26°W
- Country: Algeria
- Province: Oran Province
- District: Bethioua District

Area
  - Total: 41.92 sq mi (108.57 km^{2})

Population (2009)
  - Total: 118,215
- Time zone: UTC+1 (CET)

Bethioua (Arabic: بطيوة), formerly Arzew (أرزيو ʾArzyu), Portus Magnus, Vieil Arzew ("Old Arzew"), and Saint Leu, is a port town and district near Arzew in Oran Province in northwestern Algeria. It has a gas port, petrochemical facilities and desalination plant.

== History ==
Bethioua is located on the ruins of the ancient Phoenicians of Carthage, became after of the ancient Roman settlement of Portus Magnus.

The region itself belonged to the Battiwa (Ibeṭṭiwen), a group of Berber clans which arrived from the Rif mountains, mainly from the Ait Said and Temsaman tribes. They were composed of clans from Zegzawa (Izegzawen), the Ait Mait, and their Maraboutic leader Sidi Amar Ben Ahmed, whose mausoleum lies facing the sea. Originally settled in Mazagran near the city of Mostaganem, the bey of Mascara granted the Ibeṭṭiwen and Battiwa coastal territory further west around the ruins of Portus Magnus (modern-day Bethioua) in 1784. Following the French capture of Arzew in 1835, the Battiwa fled the hostilities and took refuge in Mazagran once again. In 1846, French colonial authorities permitted most of the tribe to return to their lands, while simultaneously establishing the European settlement of Saint-Leu on a portion of the territory Today, the unique Riffian-Berber dialect of the tribe, known as Bettioui, is considered extinct, with only historical memory of its speakers remaining.

When the Anglo-Americans invaded Algeria in November 1941 (Operation Torch), the American troops who captured Oran landed at Beach Z, which was the strip of coastline between Arzew and Bethioua.

== Bibliography ==
- Metzmacher, M. (1979 a). Les oiseaux de la Macta et de sa région (Algérie) : Non passereaux. Aves, 3-4 : 89–123.
