= Oran Province =

Province of Algeria

Oran Province ولاية وهران
- Province
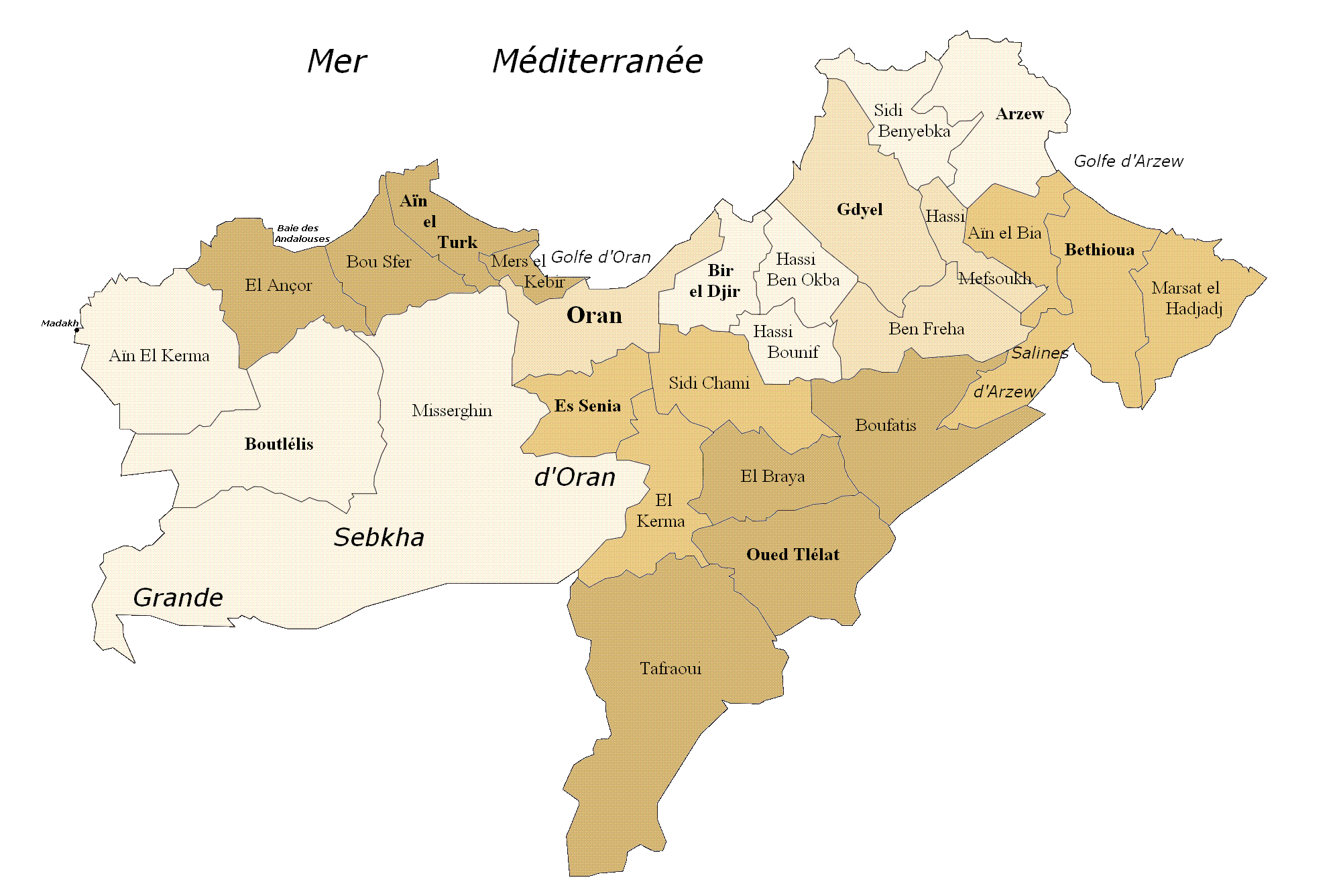
- Administrative map of Oran province

- Map of Algeria highlighting Oran
- Coordinates: 35°42′N 0°38′W
- Country: Algeria
- Capital: Oran

Government
  - PPA president: Mrs. Ayad Ratiba (RND)
  - Wāli: Mr. Mouloud Cherifi

Area
  - Total: 2,114 km^{2} (816 sq mi)

Population (2009)
  - Total: 1,584,607
  - Density: 749.6/km^{2} (1,941/sq mi)
- Time zone: UTC+01 (CET)
- Area Code: +213 (0) 41
- ISO 3166 code: DZ-31
- Districts: 9
- Municipalities: 26

Oran Province (Arabic: ولاية وهران, Wilāya Wahrān) is a province (wilayah) in Algeria whose seat is the city of the same name.

== Geography ==
It is located in the northwestern part of the country. Its population is 1,584,607 and it covers a total area of 2,114 km². The province is bordered to the east by Mostaganem, to the southeast by Mascara, to the southwest by Sidi Bel Abbes, and to the west by Aïn Témouchent Province.

== History ==
The province was formed from the former French department of Oran, which was maintained after independence and was transformed into a wilaya (province) by the ordnance of 1968. It inherited its current structure after the re-organization of 1974, when it lost its western and southern parts in favor of the creation of Sidi Bel Abbès Province.

== Administrative divisions ==
As of 1984, the province is divided into 9 districts (daïras), which are further divided into 26 communes or municipalities.

=== Districts ===
1. Aïn El Turk
2. Arzew
3. Bethioua
4. Bir El Djir
5. Boutlélis
6. Es Sénia
7. Gdyel
8. Oran
9. Oued Tlélat

=== Communes ===
1. Arzew
2. Aïn Bya
3. Aïn El Kerma
4. Aïn El Turk
5. Ben Freha
6. Bethioua
7. Bir El Djir
8. Boufatis
9. Bousfer
10. Boutlélis
11. El Ançor
12. El Braya
13. El Kerma
14. Es Sénia
15. Gdyel
16. Hassi Ben Okba
17. Hassi Bounif
18. Hassi Mefsoukh
19. Mers El Hadjadj
20. Mers El Kébir
21. Misserghin
22. Oran
23. Oued Tlélat
24. Sidi Ben Yebka
25. Sidi Chami
26. Tafraoui

== Bibliography ==
- "Projet de création de 14 nouvelles délégations communales: Une commission ministérielle pour tracer les "frontières"", Le Quotidien d'Oran (in French), Oran, 25 May 2016
