= Hassi Ben Okba =

Coordinates: 35°43′46″N 0°27′57″W

- Commune and town
- Country: Algeria
- Province: Oran Province
- District: Bir El Djir District

Population (1998)
  - Total: 9,435
- Time zone: UTC+1 (CET)

Hassi Ben Okba is a town and commune in Oran Province, Algeria. According to the 1998 census it has a population of 9435.
