= Es Sénia =

Es Senia بلدية السانية
- Municipality
- Commune of Es Senia
- Location of Es Senia within Oran Province

- Location of Es Senia within Algeria
- Coordinates: 35°39′N 0°38′W
- Country: Algeria
- Province: Oran
- District: Es Sénia (seat)

Government
  - PMA Seats: 15

Area
  - Total: 48.51 km^{2} (18.73 sq mi)
- Elevation: 77 m (253 ft)

Population (2006)
  - Total: 93,500
  - Density: 1,930/km^{2} (4,990/sq mi)
- Time zone: UTC+01 (CET)
- Postal code: 31100
- ONS code: 3105

Es Senia (Arabic: السانية) (formerly La Sénia) is a municipality in Oran Province, Algeria. It is the seat of Es Sénia District. It contains a university as well as the international airport of Oran Es Sénia.
