= Abdelkrim Kerroum Stadium =

Sports venue in Sig, Algeria

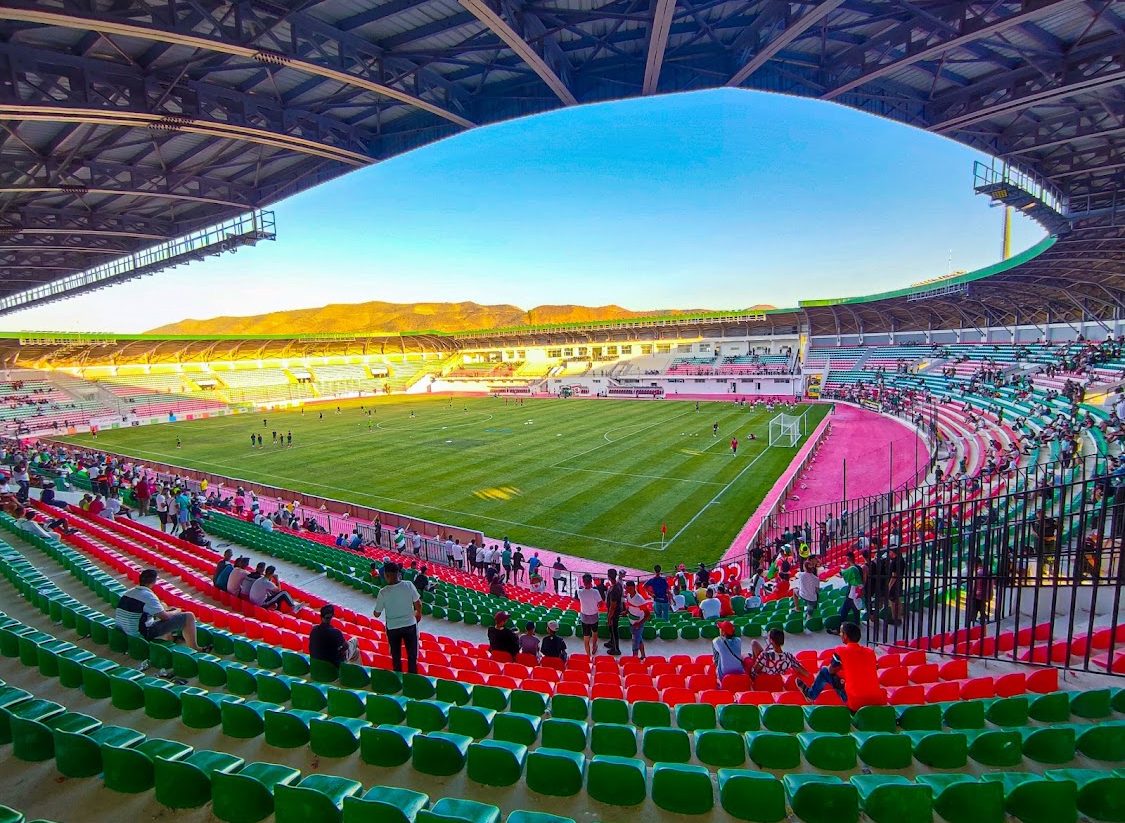
- Interactive map of Abdelkrim Kerroum Stadium
- Location: Sig, Mascara, Algeria
- Coordinates: 35°31′39.3″N 0°12′33.5″W
- Owner: CC Sig
- Operator: Ministry of Youth and Sport
- Capacity: 20,000
- Surface: Grass
- Scoreboard: Yes
- Field size: 105 x 68 m

Construction
- Groundbreaking: 2013
- Opened: 19 June 2022
- Cost: 7.1 Billion Algerian Dinar
- Builders: sarl Mezzoughi, ETOSA

Tenant
- CC Sig

Abdelkrim Kerroum Stadium (Arabic: ملعب عبد الكريم كروم), is a 20,000-seat stadium in Sig, Algeria. It is currently used for football matches and is the home ground of CC Sig.

== Stadium ==
=== Construction ===
The stadium was launched in 2013 with a capacity of 20,000 spectators by an Algerian company, and will be on the English method without a track and fully covered and is expected to host some of the football games in the 2022 Mediterranean Games. This stadium has many facilities, The secondary playground is dedicated to athletics with 1000 seats, a covered hall with 500 seats and an Olympic swimming pool. The work of the four sports structures of this pole occupies 13 hectares, It has been supported by a variety of service facilities, including a gymnasium, café and restaurant. In late May and early June 2022, the lighting was installed at the level of the main stadium and the annex, the stadium it is equipped with all the necessary equipment, such as the remote surveillance system with cameras, electronic gates, four changing rooms and many other amenities.

=== Handover and opening ===
On June 19, 2022, the stadium was officially opened and in the presence of a large audience and a parade ceremony was organized in anticipation of this opening. and the stadium was officially named Abdelkrim Kerroum who was a member of the FLN football team.

== See also ==
- List of football stadiums in Algeria
- List of African stadiums by capacity
- List of association football stadiums by capacity
