= Oued Tlélat =

Coordinates: 35°33′N 0°27′W

- Commune and town
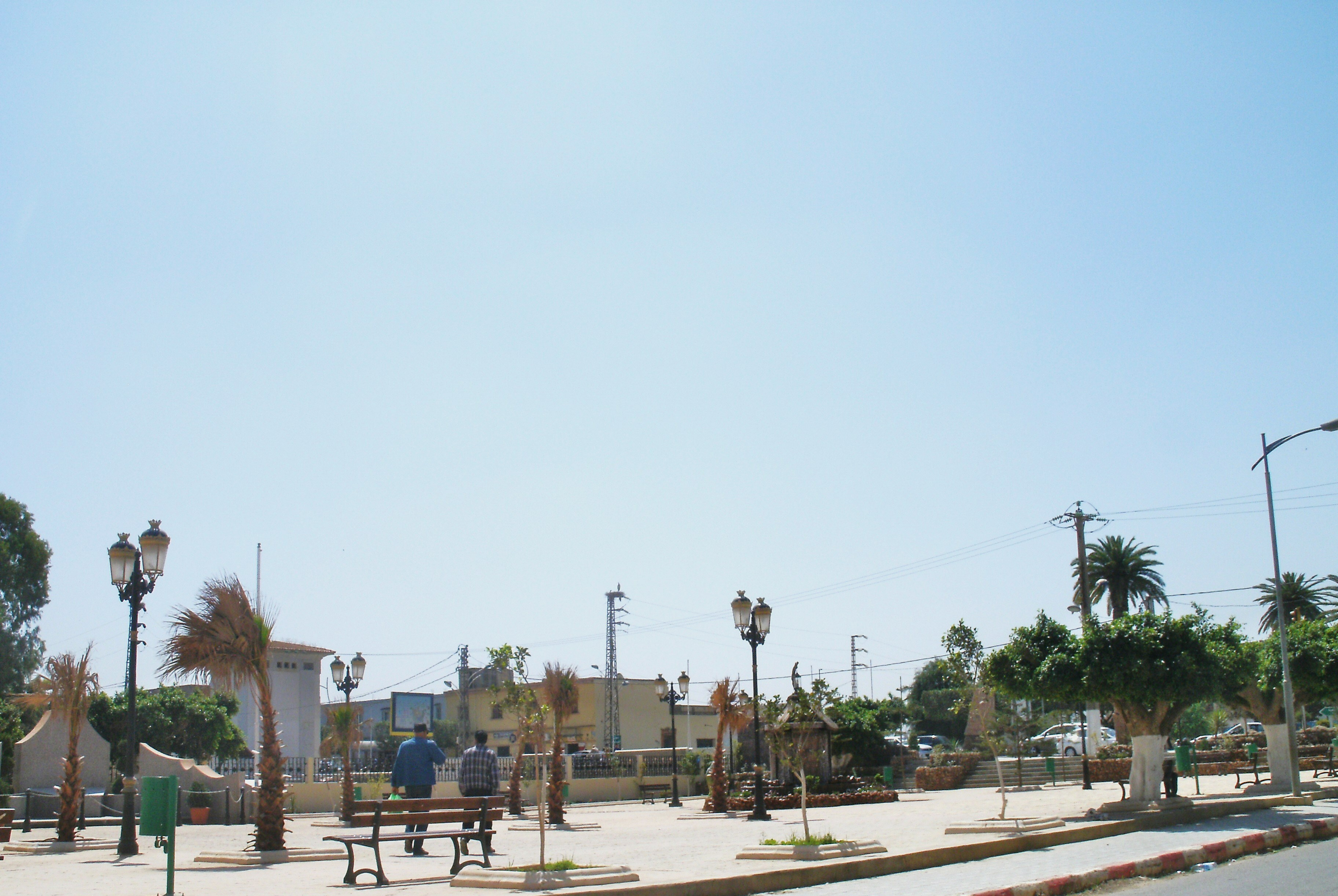

- Country: Algeria
- Province: Oran Province
- District: Oued Tlélat District

Population (1998)
  - Total: 13,289
- Time zone: UTC+1 (CET)

Oued Tlélat is a town and commune in Oran Province, Algeria. According to the 1998 census it has a population of 13289.
