= Misserghin =

Misserghin ⵎⴻⵙⵔⴻⴳⵉⵏ
- Municipality
- Misserghin
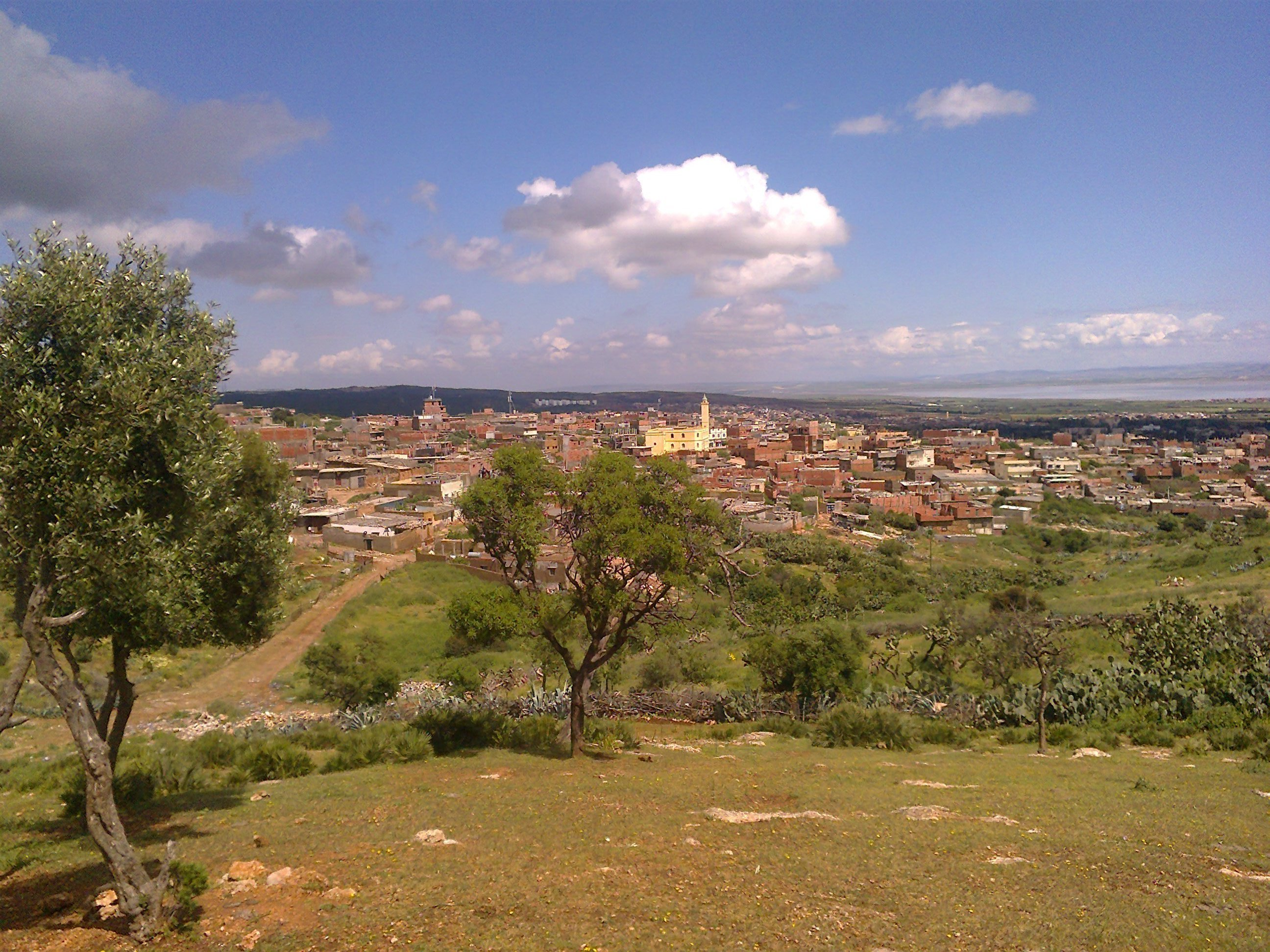

- Location of Misserghin within Oran Province

- Location of Misserghin within Algeria
- Coordinates: 35°37′10″N 0°43′47″W
- Country: Algeria
- Province: Oran
- District: Boutlélis

Government
  - PMA Seats: 9

Area
  - Total: 428.28 km^{2} (165.36 sq mi)
- Elevation: 78 m (256 ft)

Population (2006)
  - Total: 26,100
  - Density: 60.9/km^{2} (158/sq mi)
- Time zone: UTC+01 (CET)
- Postal code: 31180
- ONS code: 3123

Misserghin (sometimes spelled Miserghin or Mizerghin) is a city in Boutlélis District, Oran Province, Algeria. Its territory is mainly covered by a salt lake called the Sebkha of Oran. The territory of the commune is extensive (42,828 ha) and includes the great salt depression. In this city, the citrus fruit clementine were discovered by Father Clément Rodier in 1892. Although it is famous for its agriculture and especially for the clementine variety of citrus fruits, native to the locality, there is really only 13,350 ha of land available, of which 1/3 (4,036 ha) constitutes the useful agricultural area and 9,109 ha (almost 2/3) the forest estate.

Dr. Chérif Sid Cara, one of the few Algerian Muslims who supported the French generals' putsch in April 1961, was the last mayor of Misserghin under French rule.

== Location ==
Misserghin is located 5 kilometers west of Oran. The territory of the commune is extensive (42,828 ha) and includes the great salt depression, the Sebkha of Oran (on 29,478 ha).

== Geography ==
The relief of the commune of Misserghin is largely tabular. Indeed, it extends over the summit and the long southern slope of the Djebel Murjadjo, the latter is connected to the south, to a narrow plain on the edge of the Oran sebkha by a series of short steep slopes

== Sectors ==
In 1984, the commune of Misserghin was formed from the following localities:

- Old village of Misserghin
- New village of Misserghin
- Douar of Ben Aissi
- Hai Si Rabeh
- Oued el Kseb

== Climate ==
The climate in Misserghin is steppe, rainfall is low all year round. The Köppen classification is of the BSh type. The average temperature is 18.4 °C. The average annual rainfall does not exceed 400 mm

== Transport ==
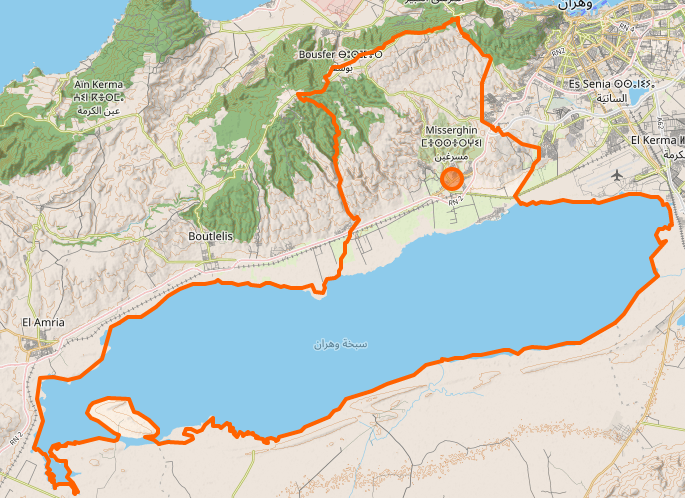
Relief et les limites de la commune de Misserghin et la sebkha.

Misserghin is located on the national road 2 Oran-Aïn Témouchent-Tlemcen and has a station on the Oran-Aïn Témouchent railway line.

== Vegetation ==
Half of the commune is occupied by forest formations. The territory of Misserghin is structured in 3-4 zones: more than the north-western half of the southern slope of Murdjadjo is forested and reforested, the other north-eastern half is mainly occupied by degraded forest with the exception of an old cultivated enclave. The rest of the area is agricultural. The lower southern slopes of Murdjadjo and its foothills are mainly devoted to seasonal crops. The plain bordering the Sebkha of Oran is reserved for arboriculture: the olive tree now holds an important place while the vineyard has practically disappeared.

== Toponomy ==
The city is named after the wadi that runs through it. The name is said to be a Berber toponym meaning "The Hot Places". Another version attributed the name of the city to the name of the Berber tribe Beni Mesguen or Beni Meserguine, a branch of the Azdadja who had lived in this territory since antiquity, and to whom the foundation of the city of Oran in 902 A.D. is attributed.

== History ==
During the pre-colonial period, the locality was famous for the agricultural estate owned by Bey Hassan.

12 March 1840, Battle of Misserghin during the conquest of Algeria by France. A colonization center was created in 1844. It was populated by former soldiers and a few German and Moselle families, then by Provençals, Spaniards and Italians.

It was in Misserghin, a town famous for its orange groves, that the clementine was discovered by Brother Clément (Vital Rodier) in the nineteenth century, when he was the director of crops at the local orphanage.

Chérif Sid Cara, mayor of Misserghin, was one of the few Algerian supporters of the generals' putsch of April 1961.

== Demographics ==
According to the 2008 general population and housing census, the population of the commune of Misserghin is estimated at 25,443 inhabitants compared to 18,089 inhabitants in 1998, including 12,418 inhabitants in the capital agglomeration, 6,605 inhabitants in Hai Rabah and 3,520 inhabitants in Hai Kessab.

== Administration ==
A commune created in 1845, Misserghin was established as a full-fledged commune by decree in 1856. It remains attached to the department of Oran. It is part of the daïra of Boutlélis after Algeria's independence.

== Personalities ==
- Jules-Constant Auzimour (1893-1941), French doctor, was born there;
- Gabriel Camps (1927-2002), archaeologist and prehistorian, was born there;
- Vital Rodier (1839-1904), called Brother Clément, died there;
- Chérif Sid Cara (1902–1999), mayor of Misserghin until July 1962;
- Jean Bécourt-Foch (1911-1944), French officer, died there.
