= El Ançor =

Coordinates: 35°41′N 0°52′W

- Commune and town
- Country: Algeria
- Province: Oran
- District: Aïn El Turk

Population (1998)
  - Total: 7,929
- Time zone: UTC+1 (CET)

El Ançor is a town and commune in Oran Province, Algeria. According to the 1998 census it has a population of 7,929.
