= Mers El Hadjadj =

Coordinates: 35°47′N 0°10′W

Mers El Hadjadj مرسى الحجاج
- Commune and town
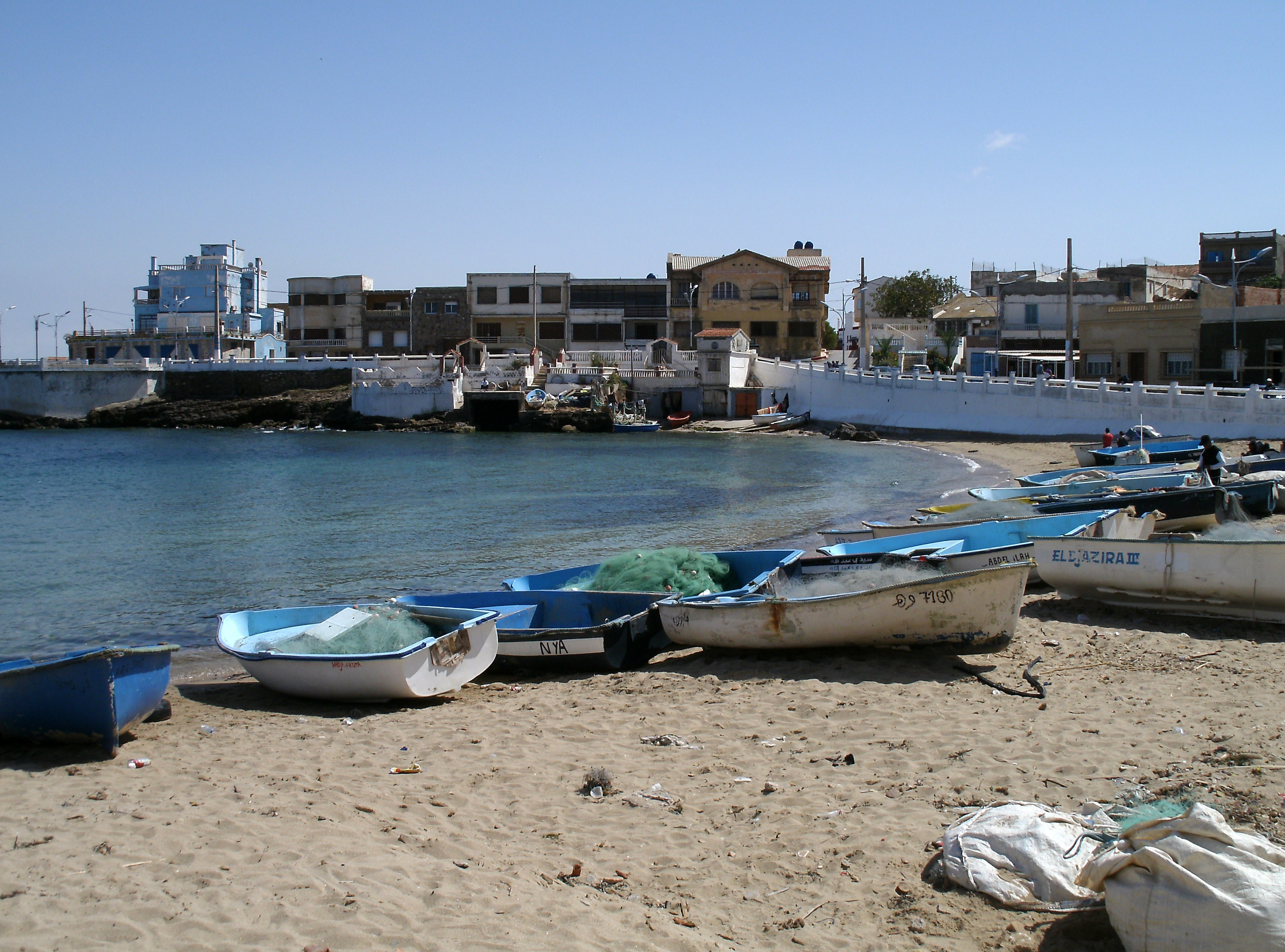
- Marsat el Hadjadj.
- Interactive map of Mers El Hadjadj
- Country: Algeria
- Province: Oran Province
- District: Bethioua District

Population (1998)
  - Total: 14,167
  - Density: 730/sq mi (282/km^{2})
- Time zone: UTC+1 (CET)
- Postal code: 31220

Mers El Hadjadj is a town and commune in mascara Province, Algeria. According to the 1998 census it has a population of 14,167.

== Environment ==
Mars El Hadjadj is located at the extreme east of the Oran wilaya, between the towns of Bethioua in the east and Fornaka (wilaya of Mostaganem). It lies in the Gulf of Arzew, with a harbor protected by two rocky capes.

=== Dunes ===
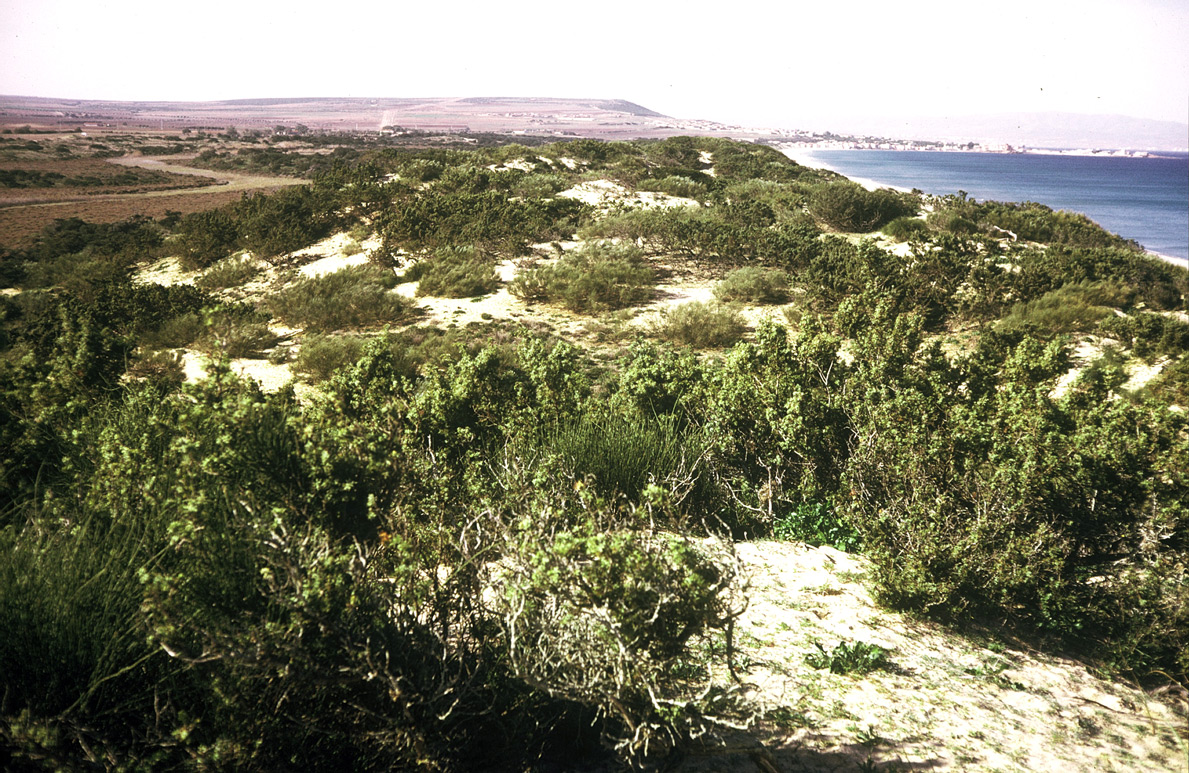
Macta dunes 1975.

The area of coastal dunes is limited: to the north by the sea; To the east by the cliff and hill of the marabout of Sidi Mansour; To the south by the national road from Oran to Mostaganem to the bridge of the Macta, then by the river La Macta; To the west by the mouth of this river "(Simonneau and Santa, 1951). This mouth has since been clogged and a new junction with the sea was made through the dune cordon near the bridge of La Macta.

"The area of this area is about 180 ha. The vegetation is characterized mainly by the size of the stands of the Ocrea on the coastal dunes and by the extreme variety of the flora on the right bank of the river La Macta. The halophilic and heliophilic species grow there with the littoral species "(Simonneau and Santa, 1951). As the authors have already pointed out, the forest horizon is severely degraded east of these dunes (sparse, mutilated, ...). In October 1983, scientists from the National Agronomic Institute (Algeria), the universities of Liège, Gembloux (Belgium), Nijmegen (Holland), and the Royal Institute of Natural Sciences of Belgium contacted, The Algerian authorities (in particular the Wali of the Wilaya of Mostaganem).

== Name ==
Called "Port of the Pilgrims" by the Algerians, it is possible that the French name of "Port aux Poules" comes from an erroneous translation due to the phonetic and graphic similarity in Arabic of the words "pilgrims" (ألحجاج), "al-hajāj" and "chickens" (الدجاج) "ad-dajāj". Another hypothesis is an allusion to chickens frequenting the Macta River, behind the dunes of Marsat El Hadjadj. As a third hypothesis, it could simply come from the Roman name of the ancient port which occupied the gulf, whose name was Paulus, named after a high dignitary of the Roman Empire.

== History ==
=== Modern History ===
After the decree of the National Assembly of 19 September 1848 establishing agricultural colonies in Algeria, the convoy of volunteers No. 2 arriving at Arzew on 2 November 1848 was destined for the center of Saint Leu and its annexes, of which Port To the Chickens.

When in 1853, the agricultural colony of Saint Leu passes under civil administration, Port aux Poules is still attached to it.

In 1854, the prefect of Oran commissioned the study of the establishment of a population center in the place called Porto Paulo, near the Macta bridge. The site already had a few European families, was a staging and bivouac place used by the military, was frequented by many fishermen and was already an active and attractive shopping center.

The project was finally adopted in 1877, but it will take time to materialize on the ground.

In 1879, Saint Leu was erected as a full-function commune, but Port aux Poules remained attached to it. Later from the 1930s, most of the inhabitants of the neighboring village of Bethioua settled in Port aux Choules because of the development of oil refineries along the beach. It was a very ancient dwelling site, of which many Roman ruins are still in excellent state of conservation. The region of Bethioua is known for its population of Berber origin which bears the name of the place.

The official construction of the village according to the well-ordered rectangular plans of the time dates back to 1883, but will soon overflow its original framework.
