= Oran =

Coastal city in Oran Province, Algeria

Oran وهران (Arabic) ⵡⴰⵀⵔⴻⵏ / ⵡⴰⵀⵔⴰⵏ (Berber languages)
- City
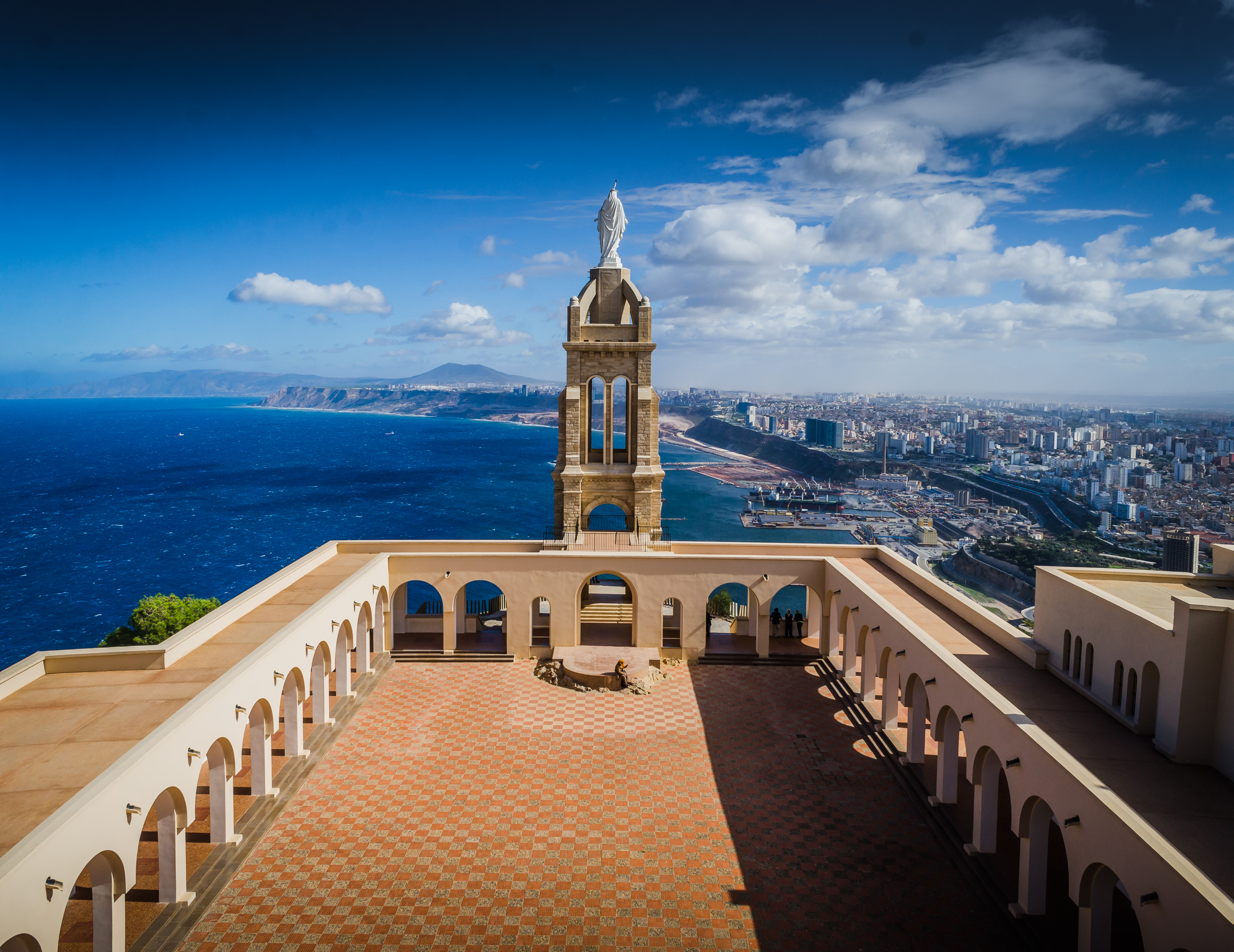
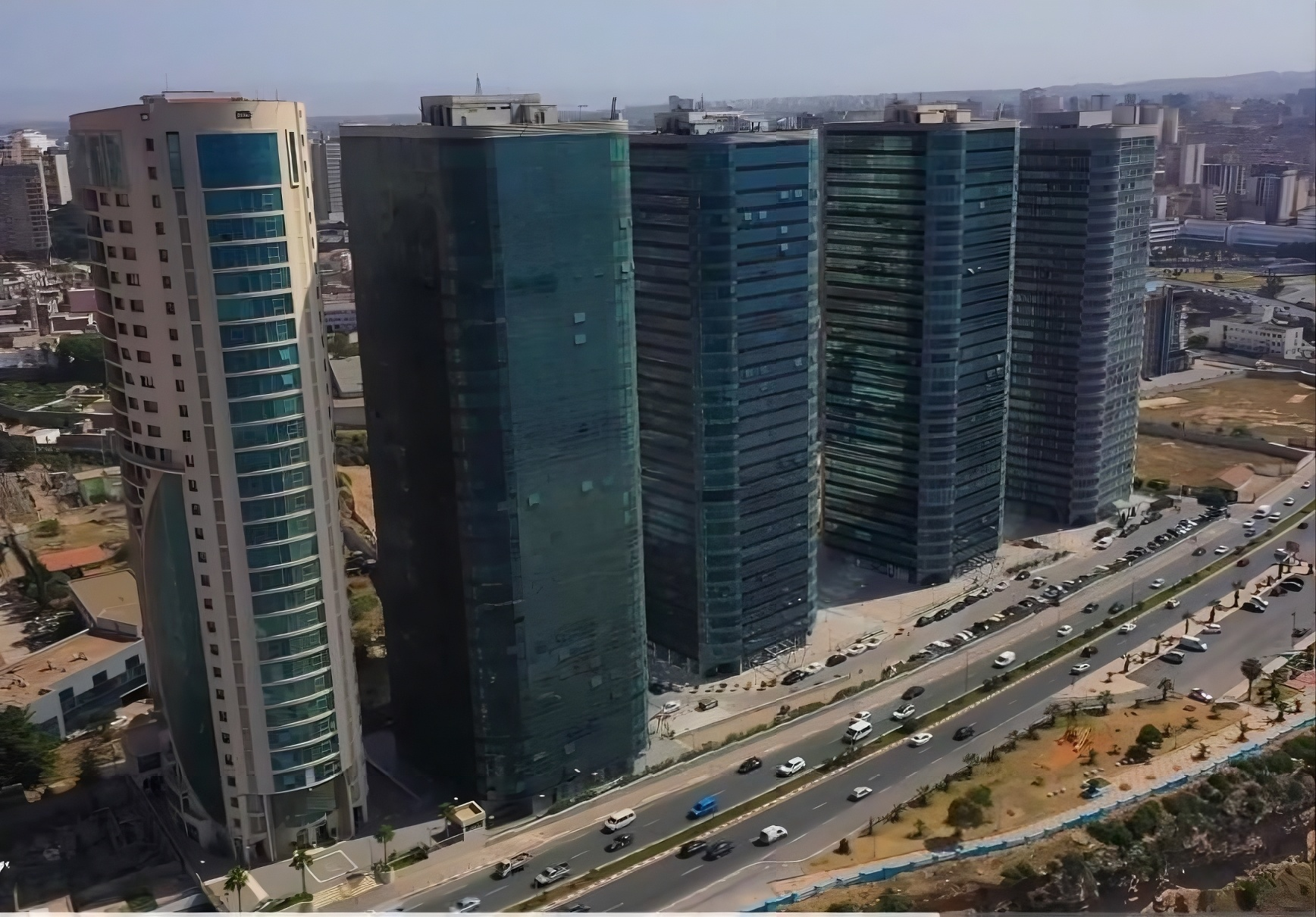
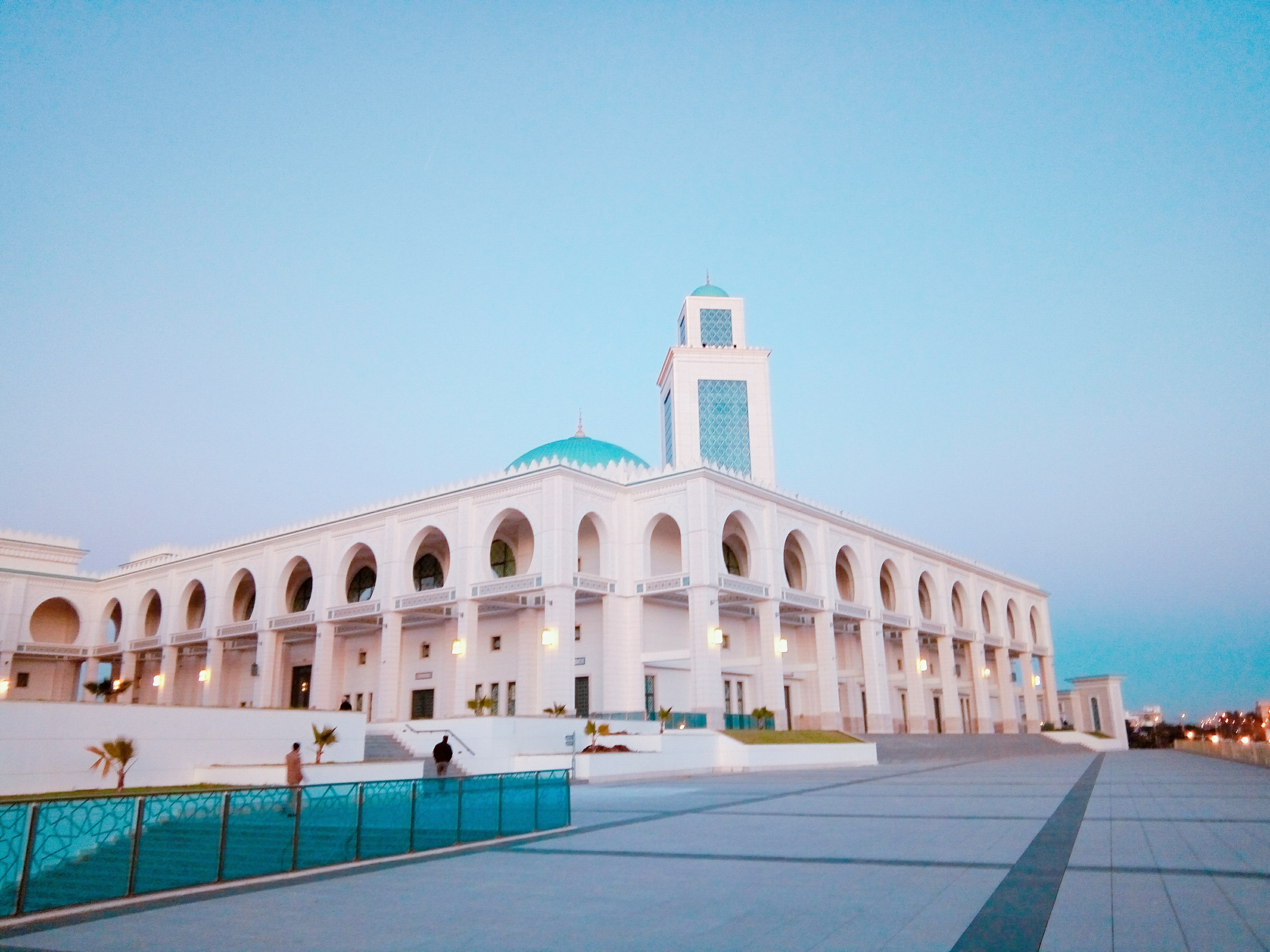
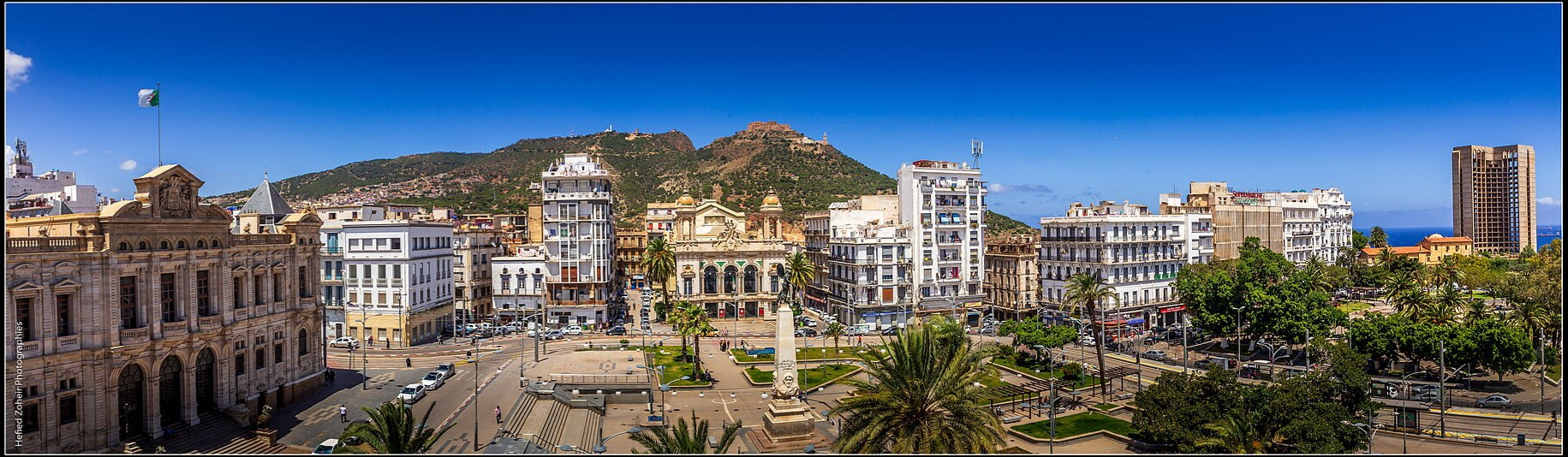
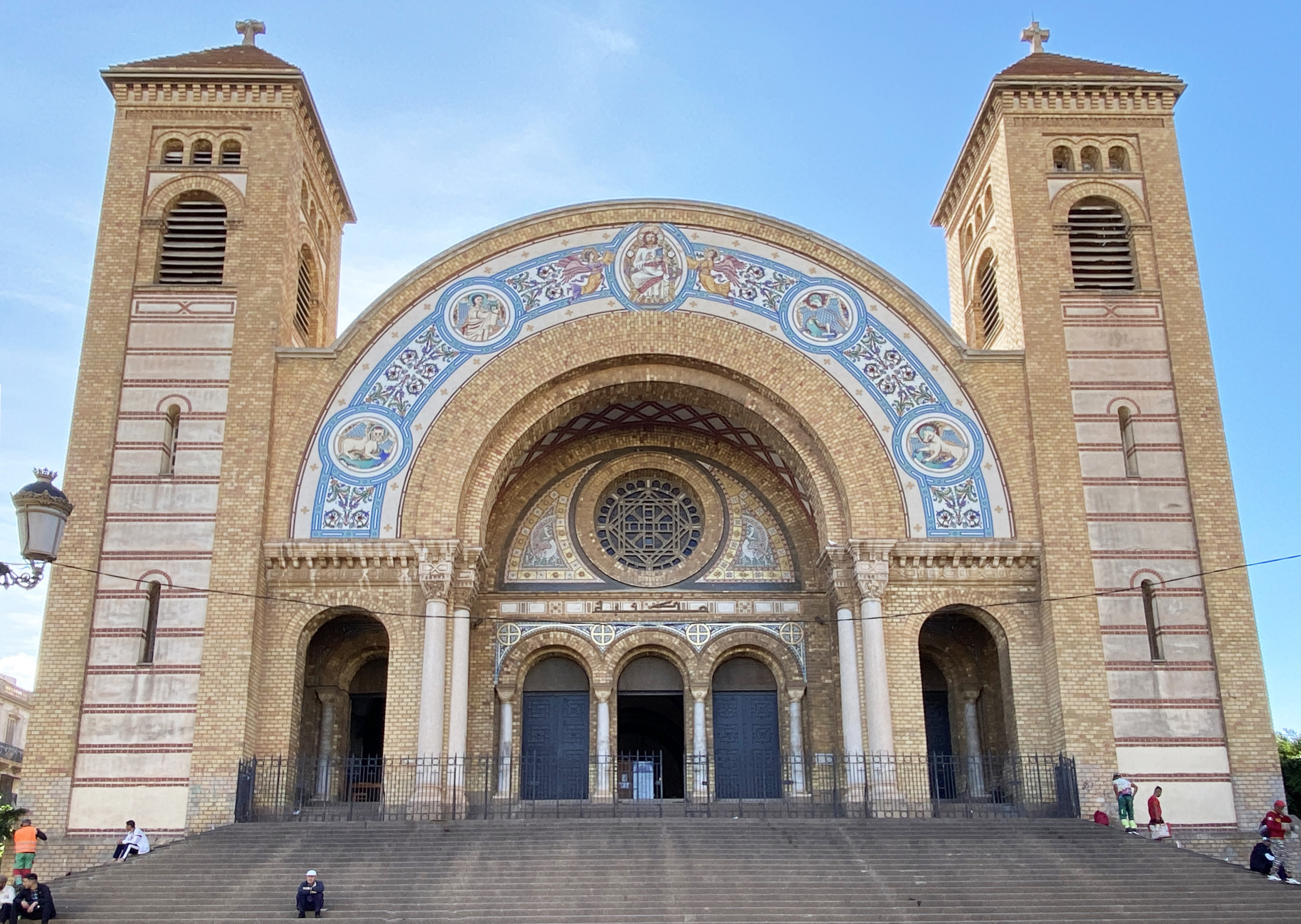
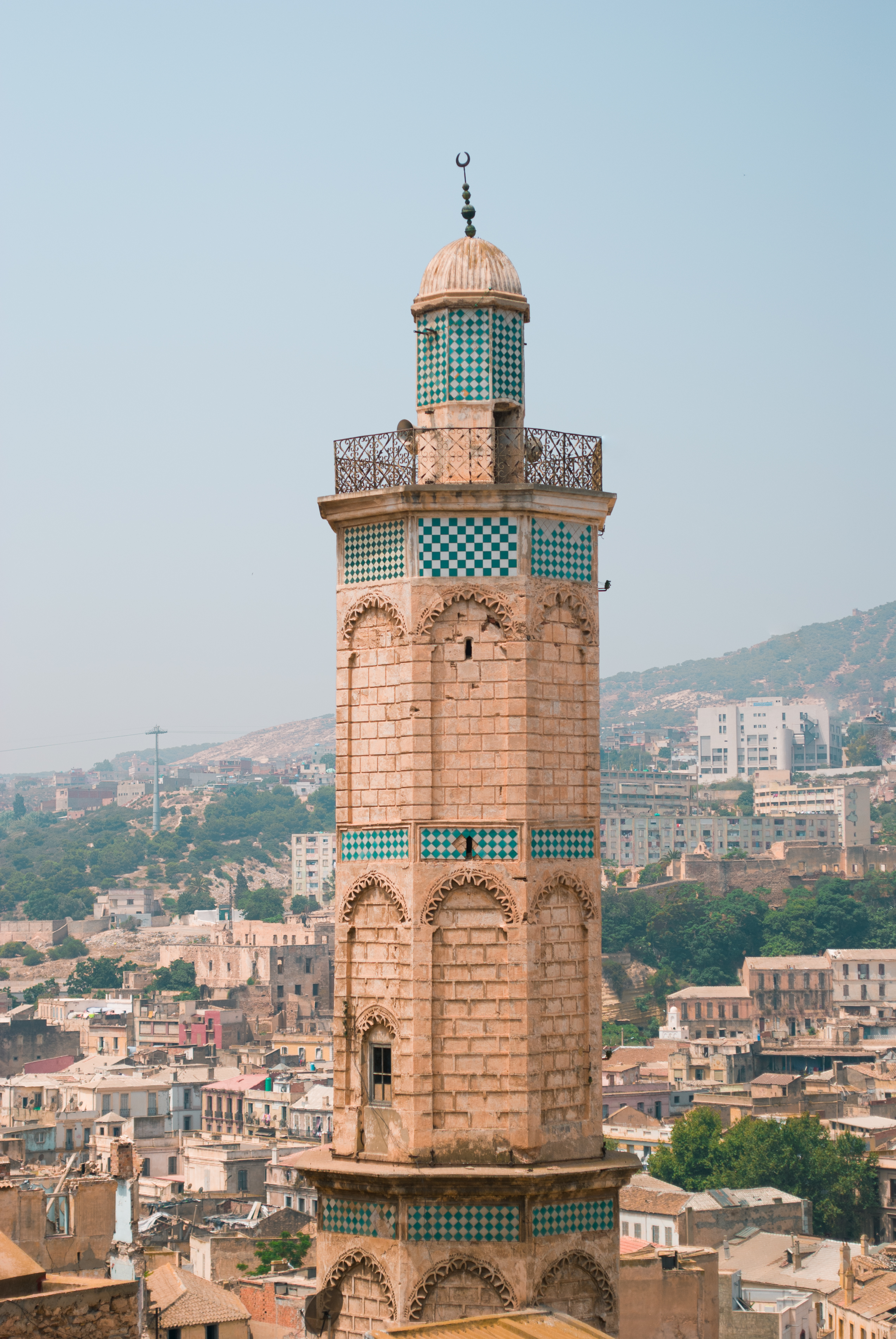
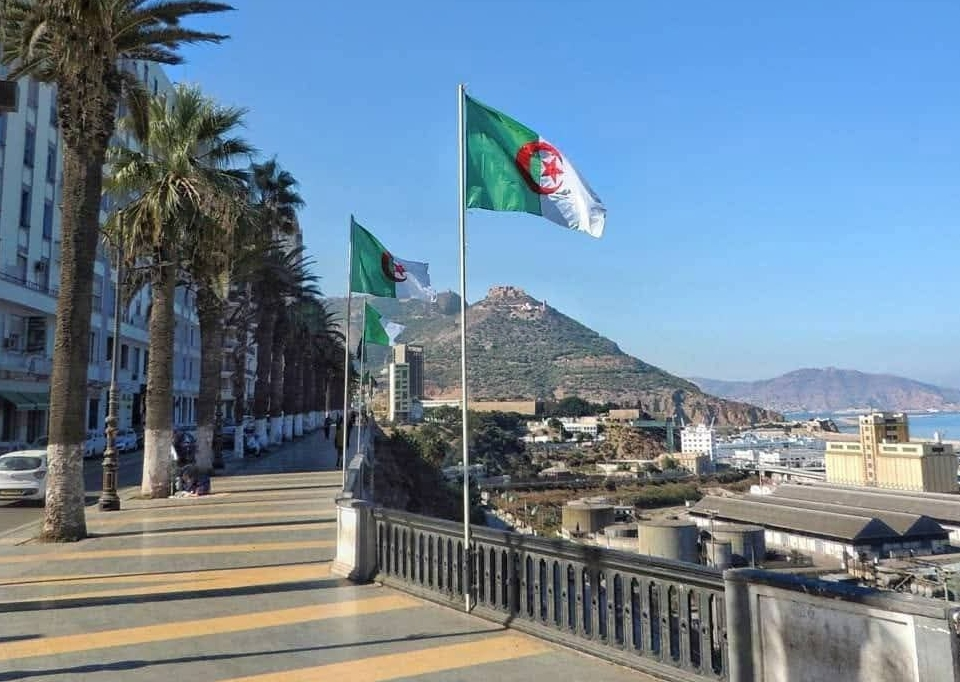
- View of the city from the Fort of Santa Cruz Bahia Center towers Abdelhamid Ibn Badis Mosque November 1st Square with the Oran City Hall on the left, the Abdelkader Alloula Regional Theatre in the center, and Mount Murdjajo in the background Sacred Heart Cathedral Hassan Pasha Mosque Oran Sea Front

- Flag Coat of arms
- Nickname: al-Bāhia الباهية

- Location within Algeria Oran (Africa)
- Coordinates: 35°41′49″N 0°37′59″W
- Country: Algeria
- Province: Oran Province
- District: Oran District
- Re-founded: AD 944

Government
  - Wali (Governor): Massoud Djari

Area
  - City: 2,121 km^{2} (819 sq mi)
- Elevation: 0.91 m (3 ft)

Population (2008 for city proper, 2024 for urban, 2019 for metro area)
  - City: 803,329 ▲
  - Density: 378.8/km^{2} (981.0/sq mi)
  - Urban: 920,000
  - Metro: 1,570,000
- Demonym: Wahrani

GDP (PPP, constant 2015 values)
  - Year: 2024
  - Total (Urban): $17.1 billion
  - Per capita: $17,500
- Time zone: UTC+1 (CET)
- Postal codes: 31000 - 31037
- Website: www.wilayaoran.dz

Oran (Arabic: وهران, romanized: Wahrān; Tamazight: ⵡⴰⵀⵔⴻⵏ, romanized: Wahṛen, or ⵡⴰⵀⵔⴰⵏ, Wahṛan) is a major coastal city located in the northwest of Algeria, 432 km (268 mi) west-southwest from the capital, Algiers. It is considered the second most important city of Algeria after Algiers because of its population and commercial, industrial and cultural importance. The total population of the city was 803,329 in 2008, while the metropolitan area has a population of approximately 1,500,000, making it the second-largest city in Algeria by population. It is the capital of the Oran Province.

Founded in 902 by the Andalusians, Oran experienced a succession of Arab-Berber dynasties and eventually became under the rule of the Zyyanid Dynasty. Occupied by the Spanish in 1509, it was reconquered in 1792 by the bey Mohamed el-Kebir. During French colonialization, it experienced rapid development and became the second largest Algerian city. After independence, it remained as the economic capital of western Algeria and its main financial, commercial, and industrial center.

== Etymology ==
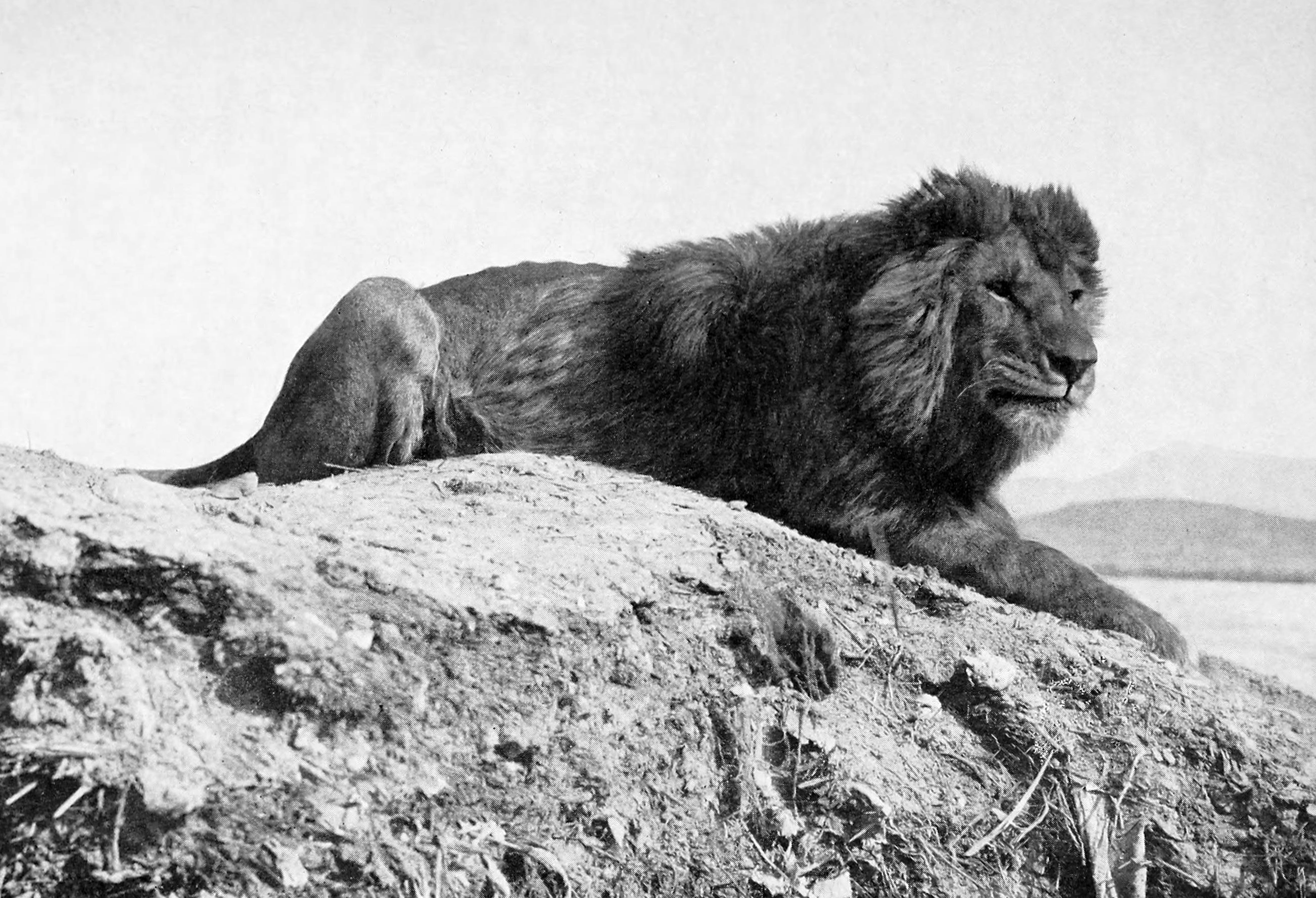
A Barbary lion, from which Oran takes its name, identified by its long mane

The Arabic name of city is وهران (Wahrān) and the Berber name is ⵡⴰⵀⵔⴰⵏ (Wahṛan). The word Wahran is derived from the Berber expression wa-ihaṛan which translates to 'place of lions'. A locally popular legend tells that in the period around AD 900, there were sightings of Barbary lions in the area. The last two lions were killed on a mountain near Oran, and it became known as la Montagne des Lions ('the Mountain of Lions').

The hypothesis deriving the city's name from the Libyco-Berber root for 'lion' is the most plausible one, linking the name to other place names such as Tiaret, Tahert, and Taher. Two giant lion statues stand in front of Oran's city hall, symbolizing the city.

== History ==
=== Overview ===
The settlement of the Phoenicians in the region, whose vast necropolis at Les Andalouses, Bethioua, Mers El Kébir, Madegh can be studied, dates back to the Punic period, between the 6th and 1st centuries BC.

During the Roman Empire, a small settlement called Unica Colonia existed in the area of the current Oran, but this settlement disappeared as the Maghreb was conquered by a succession of regional powers, beginning with the Vandals in 435, followed by the Berbers of the Mauro-Roman Kingdom, and finally the Arabs around the start of the 8th century.

Present-day Oran was founded in 903 by the Azdadja and Ajissa Berbers of the Maghrawa confederation who lived in the area. The city enjoyed a period of prosperity under the Almohad Caliph Abd al-Mu'min for a lengthy period of time when he built thirty vessels to connect it with Andalusia. It endured a long, prosperous reign under the zayyanid of Tlemcen and used its ports as a key outlet to Spain in particular. It was captured by the Castilians under Cardinal Cisneros in 1509, and Spanish sovereignty lasted until 1708 when the city was conquered by the Algerians during the Siege of Oran (1707–1708). Spain recaptured the city in 1732. However, its value as a trading post had decreased greatly after a strong earthquake in October 1790, so during the reign of King Charles IV the city was recaptured in 1790–1792 by a coalition of Algerian troops against Spain which resulted in victory for the bey of Oran despite the many attempts in 1563. The beylik lasted until 1831 when the city fell to the French.

Under French rule during the 19th and 20th centuries, Oran was the capital of the Département of Oran (number 92). In July 1940, the British navy shelled French warships in the port after they refused a British ultimatum to surrender; this action was taken to ensure the fleet would not fall into German hands, as the Nazis had defeated France and occupied Paris. The action increased the hatred of the Vichy regime for Britain but convinced the world that the British would fight alone against Nazi Germany and its allies. The Vichy government held Oran during World War II until its capture by the Allies in late 1942, during Operation Torch.

Also, during French rule, Jews were encouraged to modernize and take on jobs they had not before, including agriculture, while Muslims were forced out of the city and their ancestral fertile lands were confiscated and given to Colons. Jews in the city were allowed to join the French Army starting 24 October 1870, while Muslims were forced to do military service. Algerian Jews were granted citizenship while Algerian Muslims were not. Jews would soon be targeted after the war for not supporting the struggle for independence against France.

Before the Algerian War of 1954–1962, Oran had one of the highest proportions of Europeans of any city in North Africa. In July 1962, after a ceasefire and accords with France, the FLN entered Oran and were shot at by Europeans. A mob attacked pied-noir neighborhoods in response to the incident and during the subsequent Oran massacre of 1962 at least 95 and as many as 365 were killed; many others are reported to have "disappeared". This triggered a larger exodus of Europeans to France, which was already underway. In 1962, most of the Europeans and Algerian Jews living in Oran were repatriated to France.

=== Religious history ===
==== Jewish presence in Oran ====
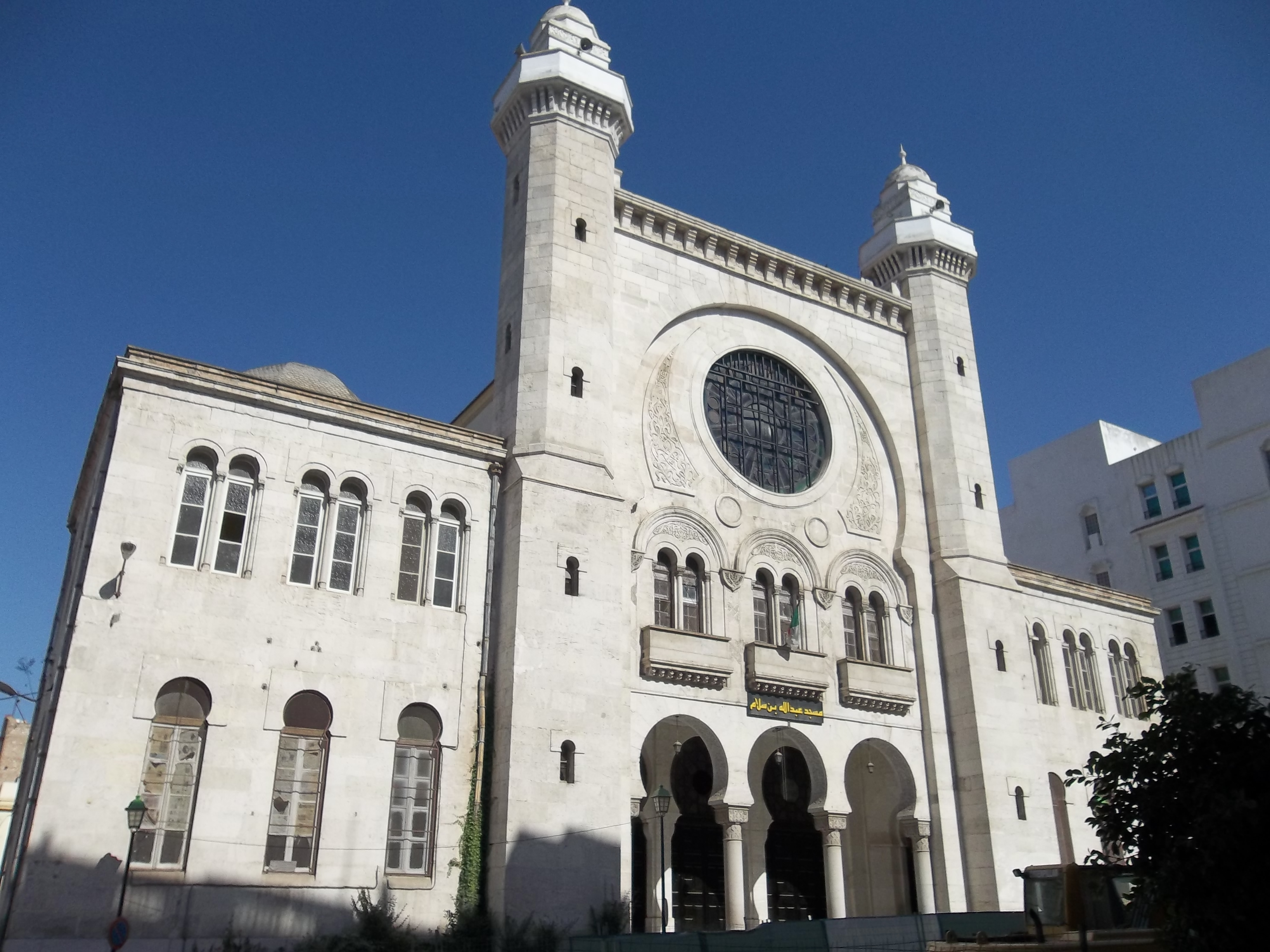
The Great Synagogue of Oran was converted into a mosque in 1975.

With its location as the closest port to Spain and its prominence on the Mediterranean, Jewish refugees first immigrated to Oran to flee persecution and conversion to Christianity in Spain in 1391. This refuge brought other religious refugees that included both Jews again and Muslims in both 1492 and 1502.

=== Islamic dynasties (910–1509) ===
Start year	End year	Event
910	1082	By 910 Oran became a perpetual object of conflict between the Umayyads of al-Andalus and the Fatimids of Kairouan.
1082	1145	Presence of Almoravids in 1082. In 1145, Tashfin ibn Ali perished in the outskirts of Oran while trying to flee the besieging Almohad troops, who had already captured Tlemcen.
1145	1238	Presence of Almohads. 1147 marked the beginning of a period of persecution of Oran's Jews.
1238	1509	Presence of the Zianides of Tlemcen. The Oranians grew rich from protection by the Emir, the customs system (tariffs), trade with Marseille, and the Italian Maritime Republics of Genoa and Venice, with whom, in 1250, Oran signed a commercial treaty for 40 years. Toward the end of the 14th century, celebrated Arab historian Ibn Khaldoun wrote, "Oran is superior to all other cities by its trade. It's a paradise for the unhappy one. Those who arrive poor in its walls, will leave it again rich." The city excelled in the export of lead, wool, skins, fine burnous, carpets, haïks, cumin, nuts and galls.

=== Spanish period (1509–1708, 1732–1792) ===
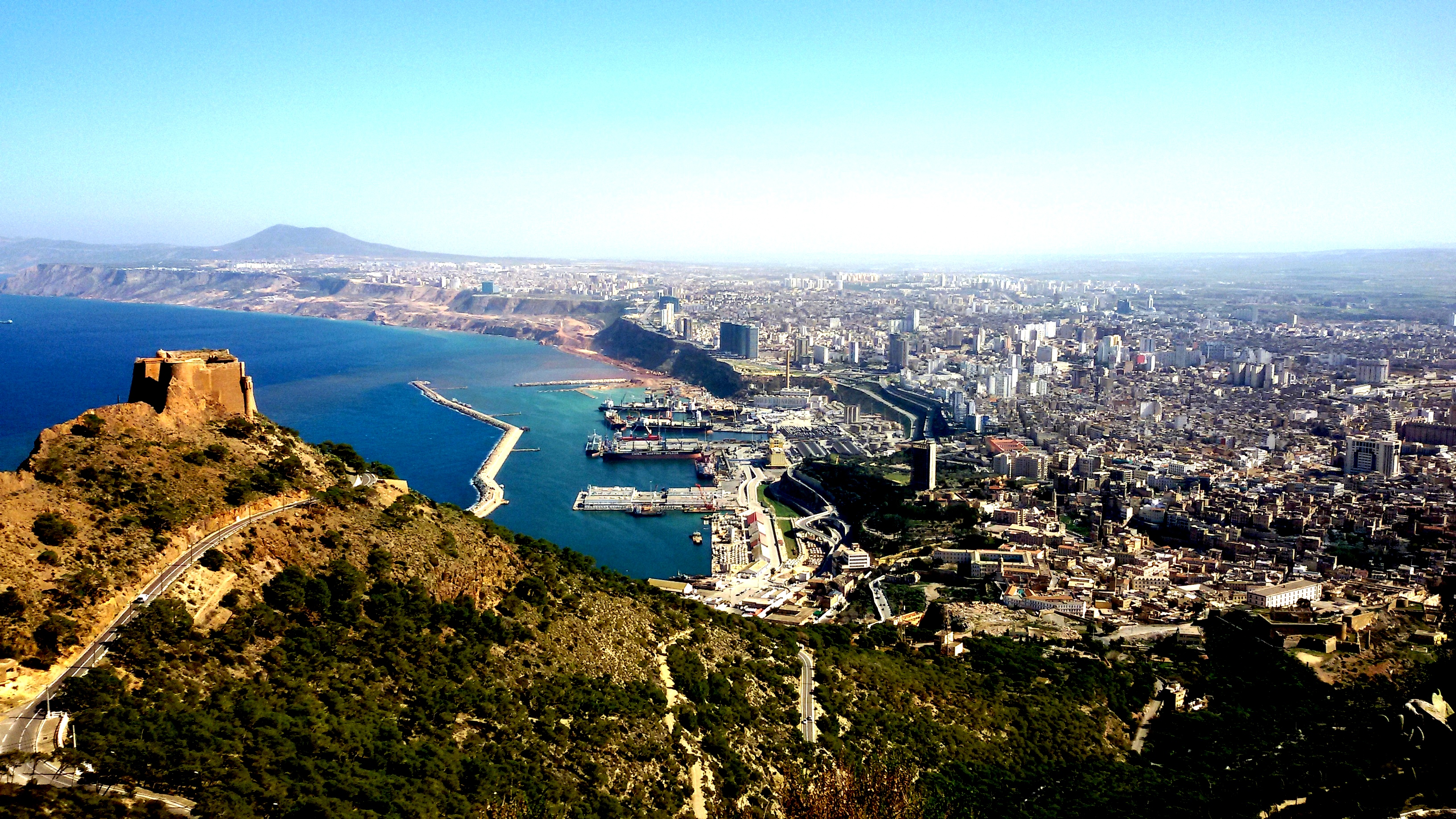
The Santa Cruz Fort, Oran. Santa Cruz is Spanish for "holy cross".

Before the Spaniards, the Portuguese launched a failed expedition to capture the city in July 1501. Four years later, the Spanish took Mers-el-Kébir, located just six kilometres (four miles) west of Oran. Thus began the first organized incursions against the city which, at the time, numbered 25,000 inhabitants and counted 6,000 fueros. Count Pedro Navarro, on the orders of Cardinal Francisco Jiménez de Cisneros, finally captured the city on 17 May 1509. The occupying forces set fire to the books and archives of the town.

By 1554, the Turks had reached Algiers. The governor of Oran, Count Alcaudete, allied himself with Moroccan Sultan Mohammed ash-Sheikh against them. Nine years later, in 1563, Álvaro de Bazán, Marquis de Santa Cruz, built the fort of Santa-Cruz, strategically placed at the top of a mountain, l'Aïdour, more than 300 m (1,000 ft) above the sea, directly to the west of the city. Pedro Garcerán de Borja, Grand Master of the Order of Montesa, was captain of Oran when, on 14 July 1568, John of Austria (the illegitimate son of Charles I and paternal half-brother of King Philip II), led a flotilla of 33 galleys against the Algerians.

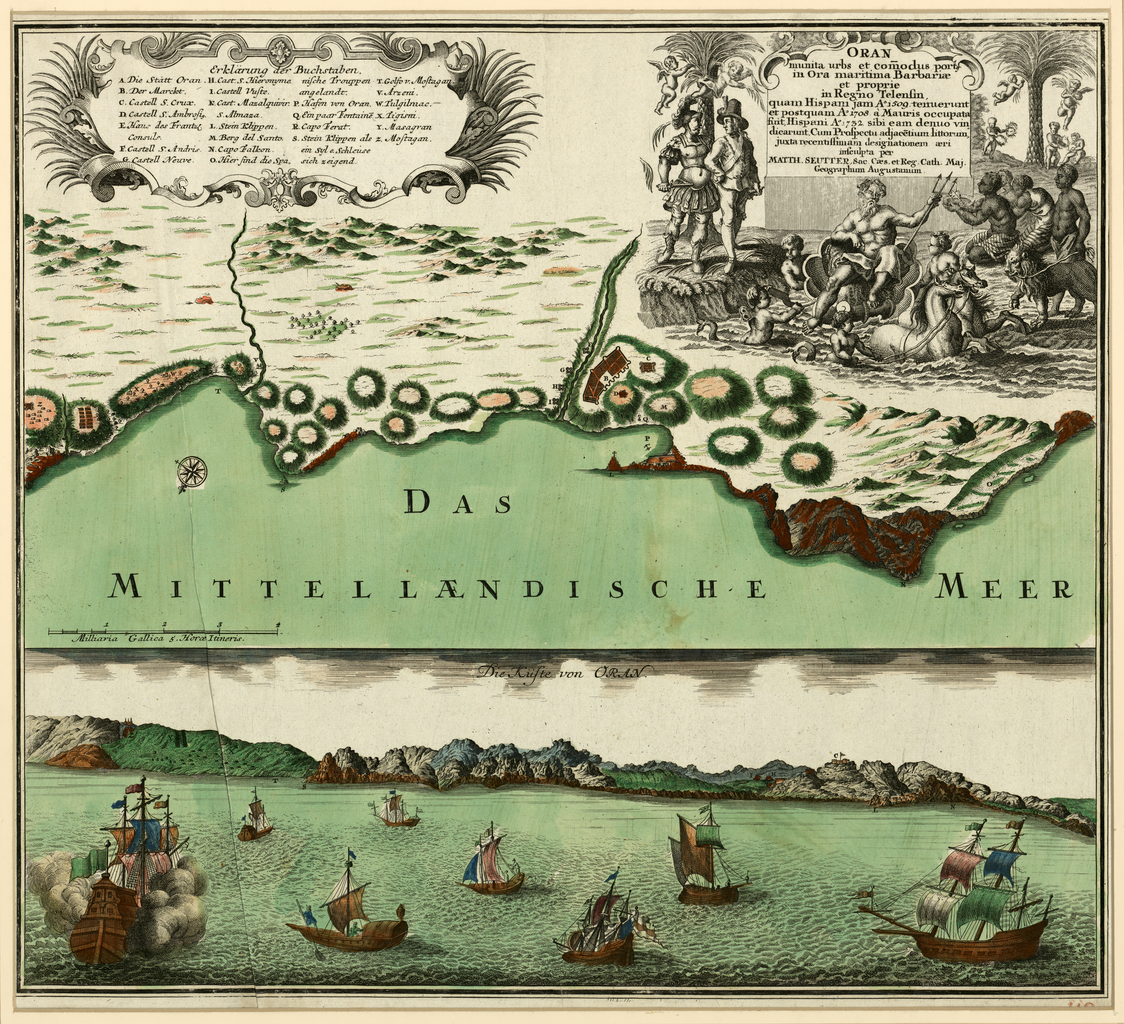
A two-part map showing the port of Oran in the 18th century, by German map publisher Matthäus Seutter

In April 1669 the Spanish governor, the 6th Marquess of Los Vélez, expelled all the Jews who lived in Oran and Mers El Kébir sending them to be resettled in either Nice, or Livorno.

The Spanish rebuilt Santa Cruz Fort to accommodate their city governors. "The fortifications of the place were composed of thick and continuous walls of over two and a half km in circumference, surmounted by strong towers spaced between them," with a central castle or kasbah where the Spanish governor had his headquarters. Under Spanish rule, the city continued to grow, requiring enlargement of the city walls. In spite of the improved fortifications, the city was the object of repeated attacks. Notable in this regard, Moroccan Sharif Moulay Ismail tried to force his way past the defences in 1707, only to see his army decimated. In 1739, trade with the surroundings was forbidden for years due to the plague. In 1744, king Philip V asked the governor Tomás du Rollet de la tour for dromedaries to replenish the stock at the Royal Palace of Aranjuez. However, the former bey of Oran had banned trade with the Spaniards and those dromedaries gradually sent to the king had been sold by thieving tribesmen. Most of the maintenance of the place was paid by the bull of the Crusade, a contribution of the Spanish Catholic church.

=== Beylikal period (1708–1732, 1792–1831) ===
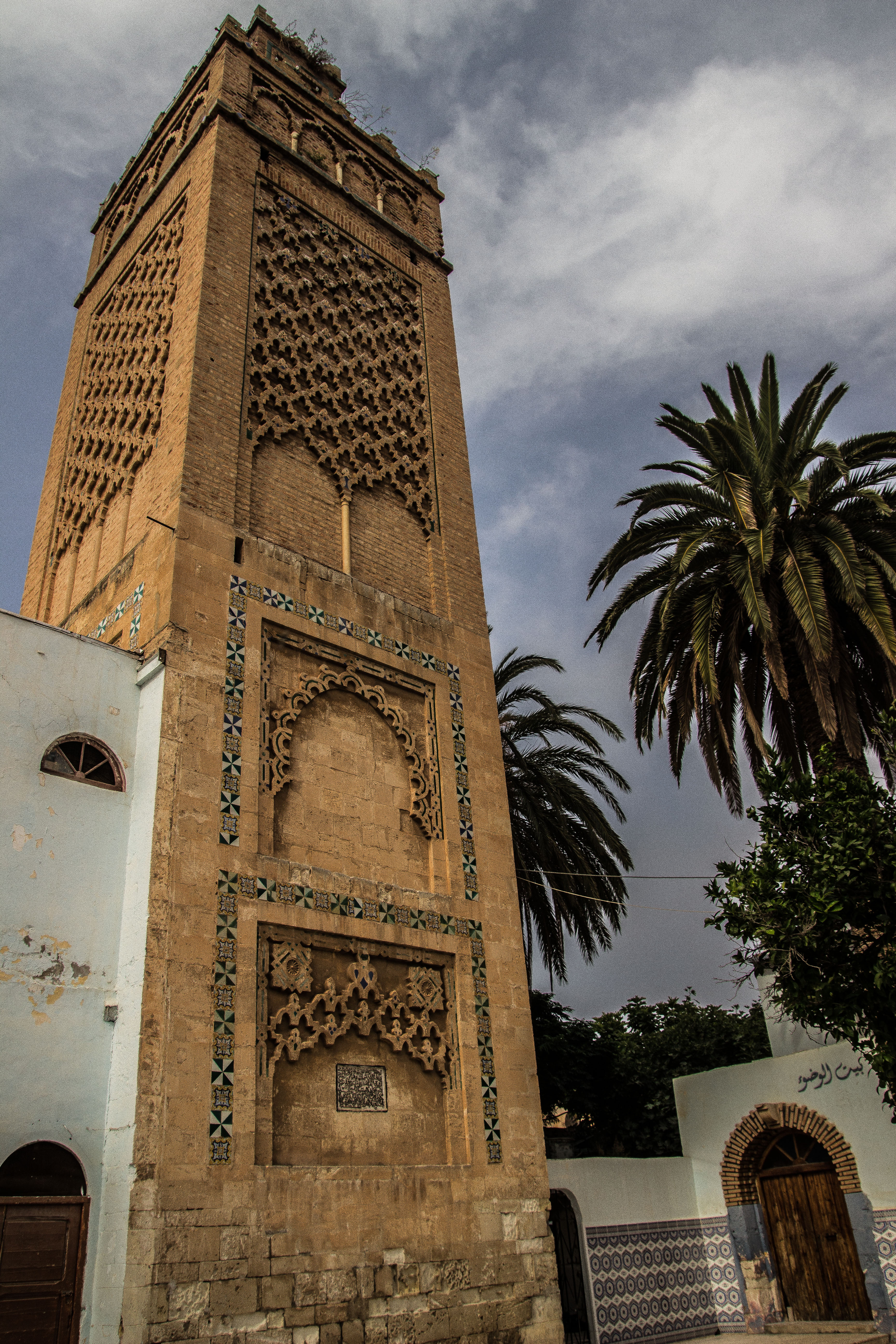
The Bey Othmane El Kebir Mosque (Minaret de la perle)

The Spanish occupied the city until 1708, when the Bey of Mascara, Mustapha Ben Youssef (Bouchelaghem), vassal of the Deylik of Algiers, and who was an Arabized Berber from the Mascara region took advantage of the War of Spanish Succession to drive the Spanish out.

In 1732, Spanish forces returned under José Carrillo de Albornoz, capturing the city from Bouchelaghem. Spain maintained its hold over Oran for the next six decades.

In the night after 8 October 1790, a violent earthquake claimed more than 3,000 victims in less than seven minutes. Charles IV saw no advantage in continuing the occupation of the city, which had become increasingly expensive and perilous. He initiated discussions with the Dey of Algiers.

==== Siege of Oran and Mers el-Kébir (1790–1792) ====
After another earthquake damaged the Spanish defences, the forces of the new Bey of Oran, Mohammed el Kebir besieged the city. By the end of 1790, there was a clear Algerian advantage. The Spanish, not wanting to risk their troops, signed an agreement with the Algerians on 12 September in Algiers, and on 12 December in Madrid, which recognized Algerian control over the city. By February all Spanish troops evacuated. The capital was moved there the same year. In 1792, the Bey settled a Jewish community there. In 1796, the Pasha Mosque (in honour of Hassan Pasha, Beylerbey of Algiers) was built by the Bey with ransom money paid for the release of Spanish prisoners after Spain's final departure.

=== French period (1831–1962) ===
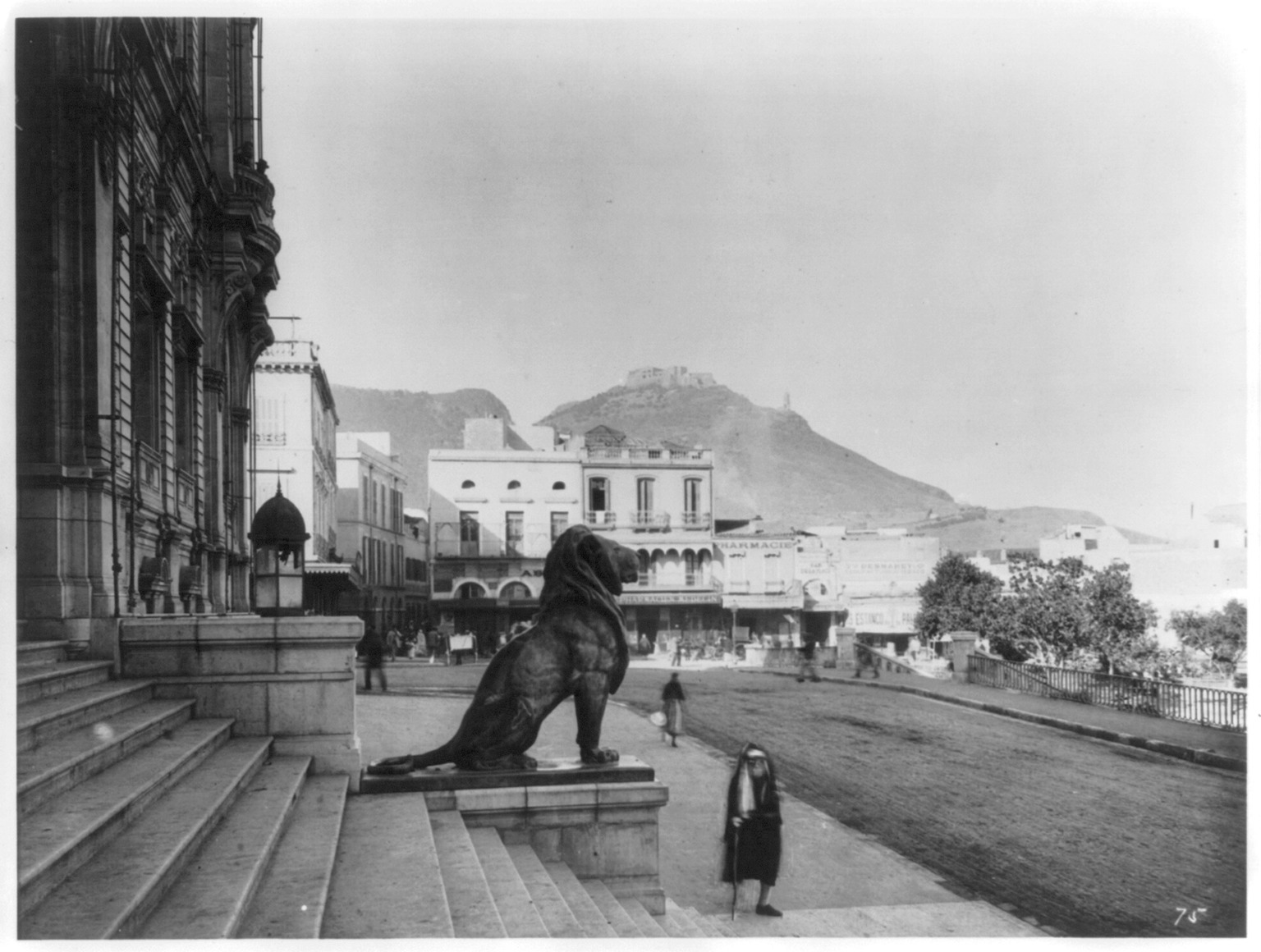
Oran from steps of City Hall, 1894

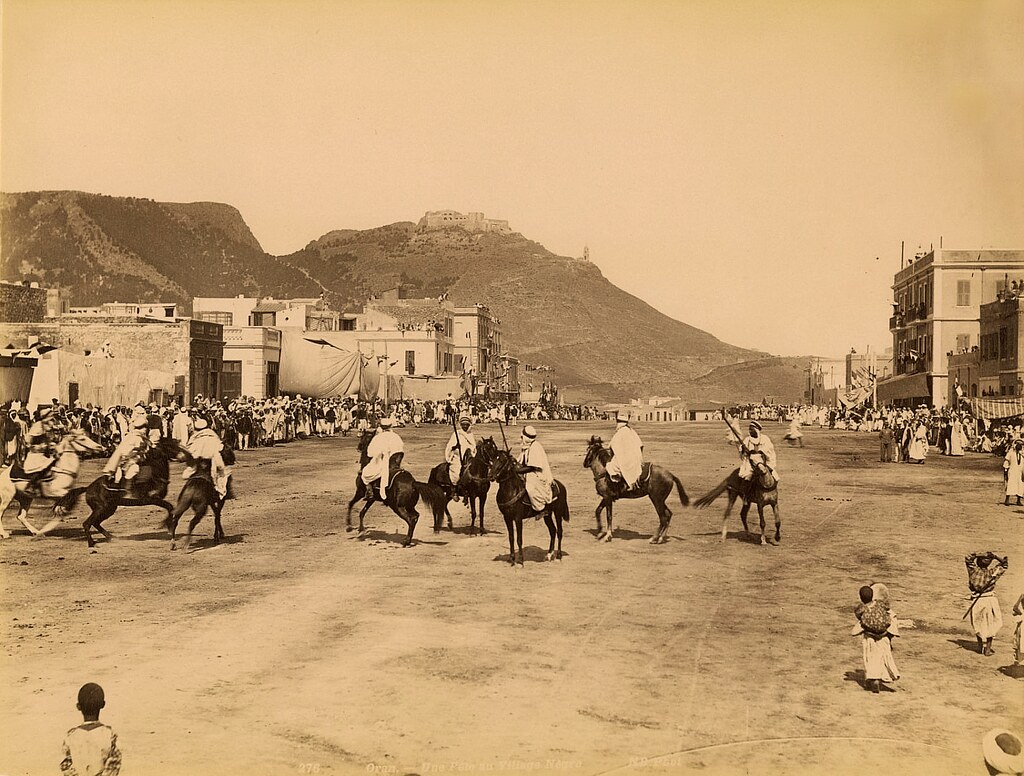
Fantasia in Oran, 1880

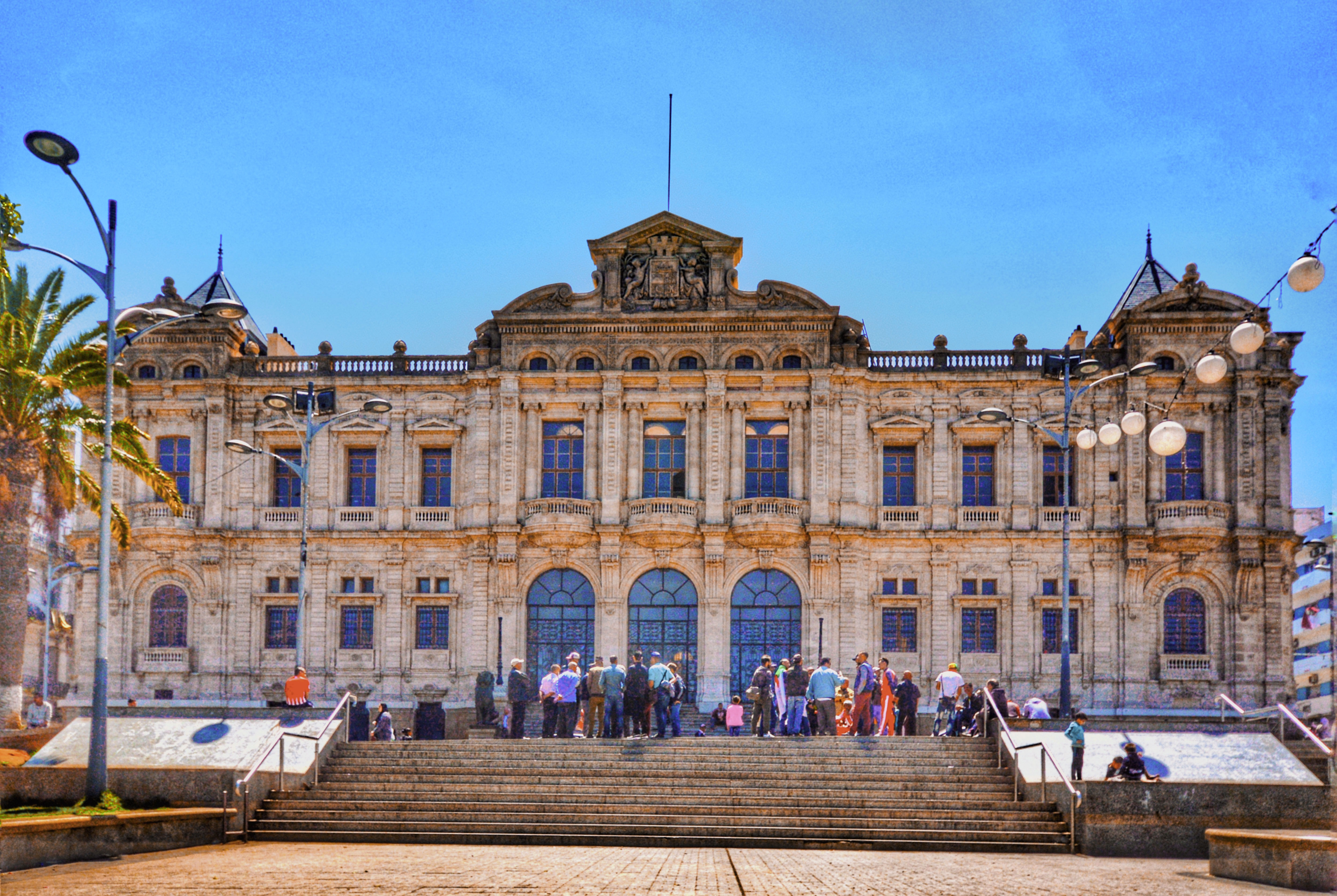
Oran's city hall, dating from the French period

The town of 10,000 inhabitants was still in the possession of the Ottoman Empire when a squadron under the command of captain Bourmand seized el-Kébir on 14 December 1830. The city was in a wretched state. On 4 January 1831, the French commanded by General Damrémont occupied Oran. In September 1831, General Berthezène appointed Mr. Pujol as mayor of Oran; he had been captain of cavalry in retirement and was wounded in the right hand under the Empire.

In 1832, leading a force of five thousand men, the young Emir Abd al-Qadir attacked Oran. In April 1833, commander-in-chief, General Boyer, was replaced by the baron Louis Alexis Desmichels. The city's defenders, under attack by Abd al Qadir, held their ground. Many Europeans settled in Oran during the French period, and by the early 20th century they formed a majority of the city's population.

In World War II, Oran was one of the landing points in Operation Torch, the first American action in the Europe-North Africa theatre in November 1942. The Task Force suffered some damage to its fleet, trying to land in shallow water, but the enemy ships were sunk or driven off, and Oran surrendered after heavy fire from British battleships.

=== Since independence (1962) ===
Due to the exodus of Pieds-Noirs, the Cathédrale du Sacré-Cœur d'Oran was converted into a public library, Aubert Library of Oran, in 1984.

Today, Oran is a major port and a commercial centre, and has three universities. The old quarter of Oran has a casbah and an 18th-century mosque. The modern section of Oran is referred to as La Ville Nouvelle and was built after 1831; this section contrasts with the older section, La Blanca.

== Geography ==
=== Climate ===
Oran features a hot semi-arid climate (Köppen: BSh). Oran's climate does show influences of a Mediterranean climate; however, the combination of the city's relatively high average annual temperature and relatively low annual precipitation precludes it from falling under that climate category. Oran averages 326 mm (13 in) of precipitation annually, the bulk of which falls between November and May. Summers are the warmest times of the year, with average high temperatures in the warmest month (August) approaching 32 degrees Celsius. Winters are the coolest times of the year in Oran, with high temperatures in the coolest month (January) at around 17 degrees Celsius.

Climate data for Oran (Ahmed Ben Bella Airport) (1991–2020, extremes 1886–present (Note: Extremes are sourced from NOAA, Deutscher Wetterdienst, and Meteo Climat.))
Month	Jan	Feb	Mar	Apr	May	Jun	Jul	Aug	Sep	Oct	Nov	Dec	Year
Record high °C (°F)	28.4 (83.1)	33.0 (91.4)	36.6 (97.9)	37.9 (100.2)	40.0 (104.0)	42.2 (108.0)	46.3 (115.3)	43.0 (109.4)	41.1 (106.0)	40.4 (104.7)	33.0 (91.4)	30.8 (87.4)	46.3 (115.3)
Mean daily maximum °C (°F)	17.0 (62.6)	17.9 (64.2)	20.1 (68.2)	22.1 (71.8)	25.0 (77.0)	28.5 (83.3)	31.5 (88.7)	32.4 (90.3)	29.4 (84.9)	26.0 (78.8)	20.9 (69.6)	17.9 (64.2)	24.1 (75.4)
Daily mean °C (°F)	11.2 (52.2)	12.2 (54.0)	14.4 (57.9)	16.5 (61.7)	19.5 (67.1)	23.0 (73.4)	25.9 (78.6)	26.7 (80.1)	23.8 (74.8)	20.2 (68.4)	15.4 (59.7)	12.4 (54.3)	18.4 (65.1)
Mean daily minimum °C (°F)	5.4 (41.7)	6.5 (43.7)	8.7 (47.7)	10.8 (51.4)	14.0 (57.2)	17.6 (63.7)	20.4 (68.7)	21.0 (69.8)	18.3 (64.9)	14.4 (57.9)	9.8 (49.6)	6.9 (44.4)	12.8 (55.0)
Record low °C (°F)	−2.9 (26.8)	−3.3 (26.1)	−1.3 (29.7)	1.0 (33.8)	3.0 (37.4)	9.5 (49.1)	11.5 (52.7)	10.0 (50.0)	7.8 (46.0)	1.2 (34.2)	1.0 (33.8)	−2.0 (28.4)	−3.3 (26.1)
Average precipitation mm (inches)	46.3 (1.82)	41.7 (1.64)	37.6 (1.48)	35.7 (1.41)	23.1 (0.91)	3.5 (0.14)	0.8 (0.03)	2.4 (0.09)	17.4 (0.69)	34.4 (1.35)	64.6 (2.54)	47.9 (1.89)	355.4 (13.99)
Average precipitation days (≥ 1.0 mm)	6.3	5.6	5.0	4.7	3.1	0.9	0.2	0.5	2.6	4.4	6.6	5.7	45.6
Average relative humidity (%)	80	77	74	73	69	70	69	68	72	75	77	78	73
Mean monthly sunshine hours	161.2	161.0	235.6	246.0	297.6	297.0	350.3	325.5	267.0	229.4	162.0	158.1	2,890.7
Mean daily sunshine hours	5.2	5.7	7.6	8.2	9.6	9.9	11.3	10.5	8.9	7.4	5.4	5.1	7.9
Source 1: NOAA
Source 2: Deutscher Wetterdienst (humidity 1949–1967, records 1941–1970), Meteo Climat (records) Arab Meteorology Book (sun)

== Earthquakes ==
As Oran is located in Northern Algeria, it faces the threat of earthquakes that can cause damage. However, the last major earthquake was in 1790; 3,000 people died as a result. Many of the existing older buildings in the city have been reinforced, and newer construction is designed to withstand earthquakes. While the city dates back to the 900s, it is rare to find houses and buildings older than the French occupation.

== City districts ==
=== List of districts of Oran ===
Neighborhoods and districts of Oran, old map

Since 2019, Oran have 18 communal délégations (ex. districts) and 83 quarters.

Arabic name and names of the districts of Oran (old division)
District	Arabic name	Name
1	الحمري	El Hamri
2	حي الإمام الهواري	Hai Imam El-Houari
3	السعادة	Es-Saada
4	المقري	Al-Maqarri
5	الحمري	El-Hamri
6	البدر	El-Badr
7	الصديقية	Es-Seddikia
8	المنزه	El-Menzeh
9	الأمير	El-Emir
10	العثمانية	El-Othmania
11	بوعمامة	Bouamama
12	محي الدين	Muhieddine

=== Medina Jedida ===
Medina Jedida or, new city in English, is a large historical and popular district. It was one of the Muslim quarters during the French colonial period. In this district, there is one of the biggest markets in the country, called Le Marché de Medina Jedida (Medina Jedida Market).

=== El Hamri ===
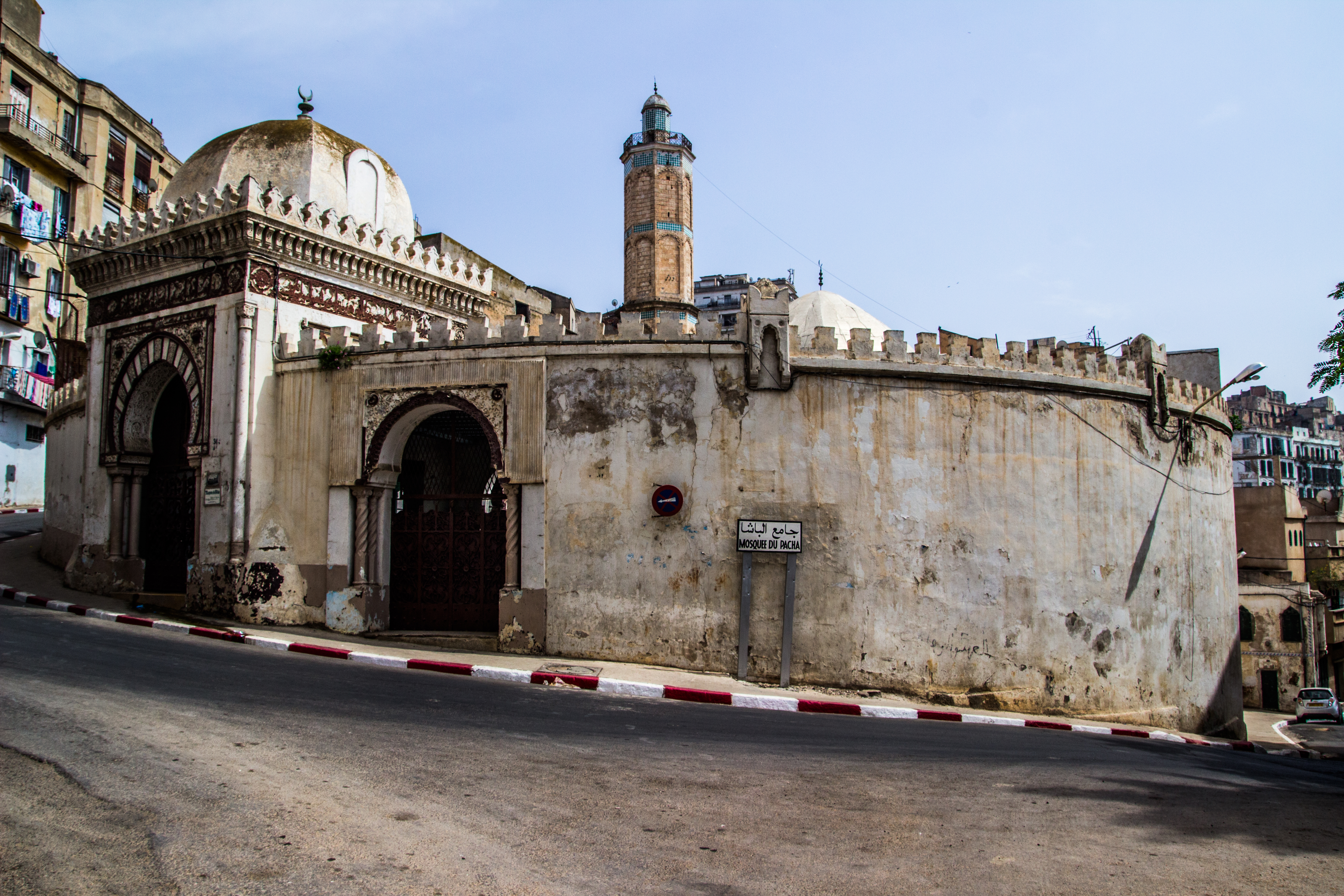
Hassan Basha Mosque

El Hamri is a large and popular district in the center of Oran, known under French rule as Lamur. The football club Mouloudia d'Oran is found there.

Neighborhood streets

- Avenue of Lamur
- Street Captain-Rahou
- Sebbalet Ayada
- Place The Sahara
- Gahwat Ettoubi
- Street Staoueli
- Street Djemaa Gazouna
- Street Bougandoura
- Street Belhadri Smain

=== Sidi El Houari ===
The historical district Sidi El Houari is a suburb in the north of the d'Oran city. The Saint-Louis college is there, as well as the old mosque of the Pasha dating from the 17th century. In this district the skin of Saint-Patron of the city in the name of "Sidi El Houari" rests. Other tourist curiosities: one ancient prefecture of the data base Stalingrad, the Spanish vestiges dating from the 16th century, and especially the Palate of the Bey d'Oran.

== Oranian agglomeration ==
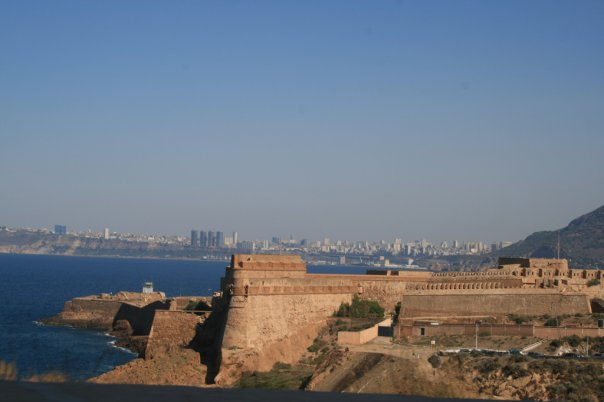
Fort Mers el-Kebir

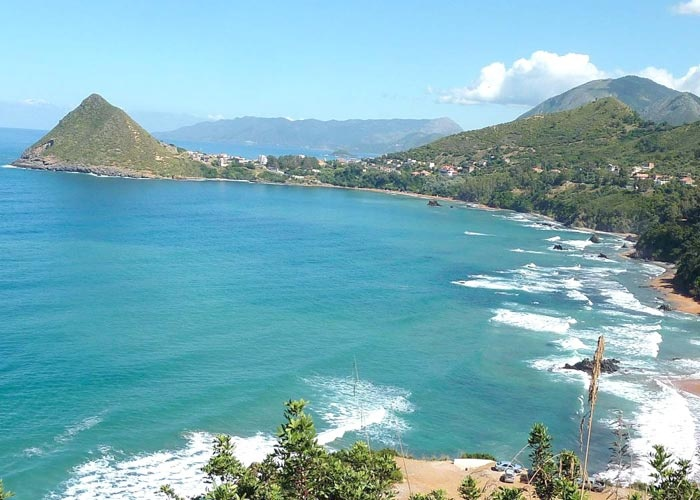
Madagh Beach (West of Oran)

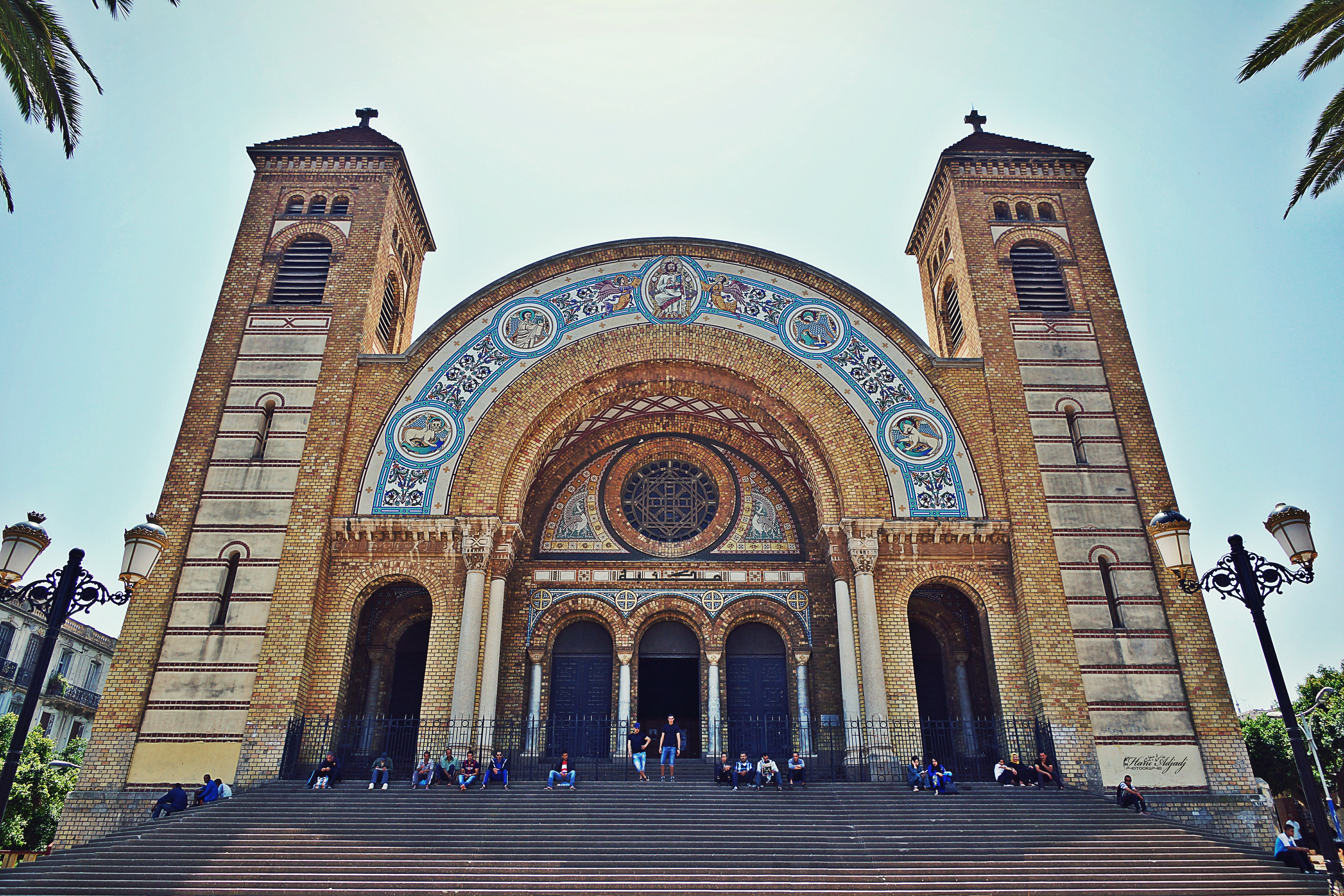
The Great Library (ex. Cathédrale Sacré-Cœur d'Oran)

The Oranian metropolis comprises several communes.

=== Mers El-Kébir ===
Mers El Kébir ("The Great Port") is a municipality northwest of Oran, about seven kilometres (4 1/2 mi) from the city centre. As its name indicates, it is a major port and has an important naval base, home to the Algerian Navy.

=== Aïn El-Turk ===
Aïn El Turk ("Fountain of the Turks") is also northwest of Oran, at a distance of 15 km (9 mi). It is a seaside town which includes several hotels and other tourist attractions.

=== Es-Sénia ===
Es Sénia, located in the south of Oran, is home to industrial parks, several university institutes (Oran-Es-Sénia University, Institut of Communication, ENPO "National Polytechnic School of Oran", CRASC "Research center in social sciences" etc.) and the international airport.

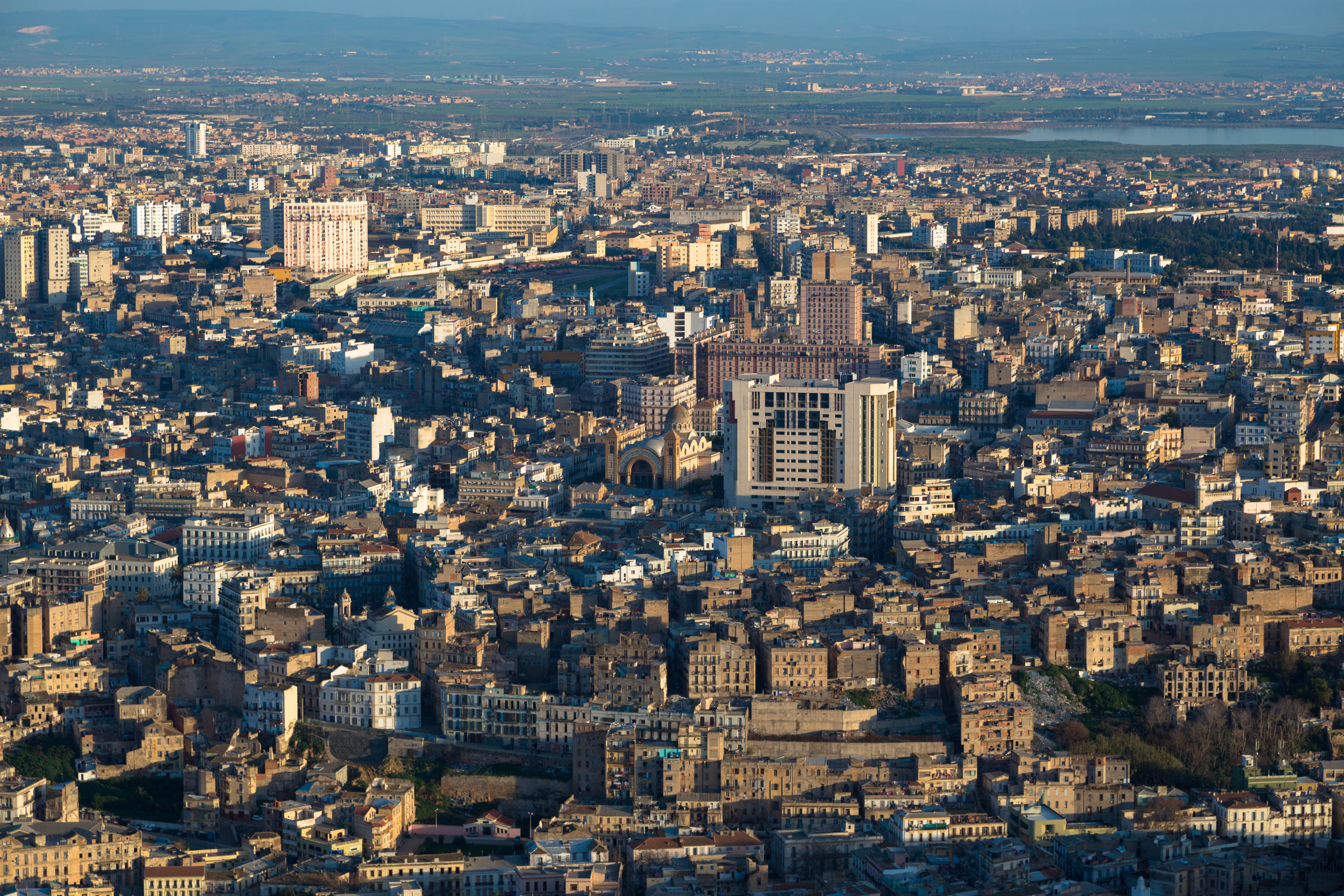
View of part of Oran from the Summit of Murdjajo

=== Bir El-Djir ===
Bir El Djir is a commune that represents the suburbs of Oran (apart from the districts). It is the future beating heart of the Oranian agglomeration. It has several buildings which are the seats of institutions as the headquarters of Sonatrach's downstream activity, the hospital Établissement Hospitalo-universitaire "November 1st, 1954", the convention center (Palais des Congrès), University of sciences and technology (conceived by the Japanese architect Kenzō Tange), the Institute of medical sciences, the Court of Justice and the National Centre of Research in Social and Cultural Anthropology. There is as well a sports complex with an Olympic stadium of 50000 places created for the 2022 Mediterranean Games.

Bir El Djir is an urban extension east of Oran, 8 km (5 mi) from the city center, with a population of 118,000 inhabitants.

=== Misserghin ===
Misserghin is a small city located to the southwest of Oran.

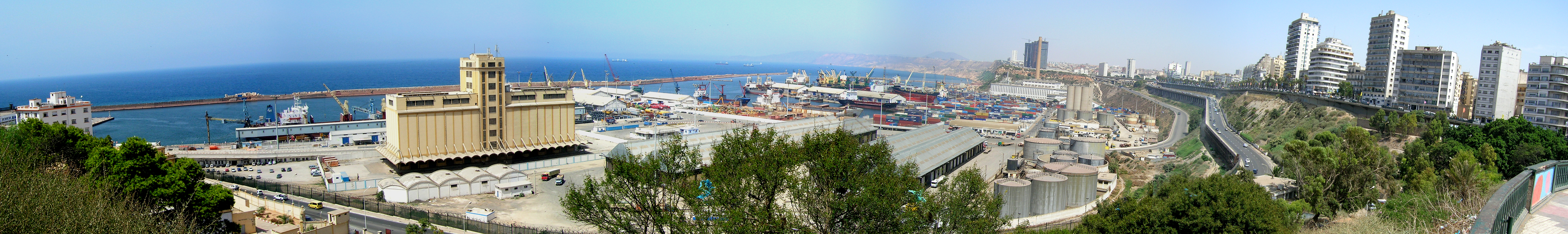
Panorama of sea front at Oran, Algeria

== Transportation ==
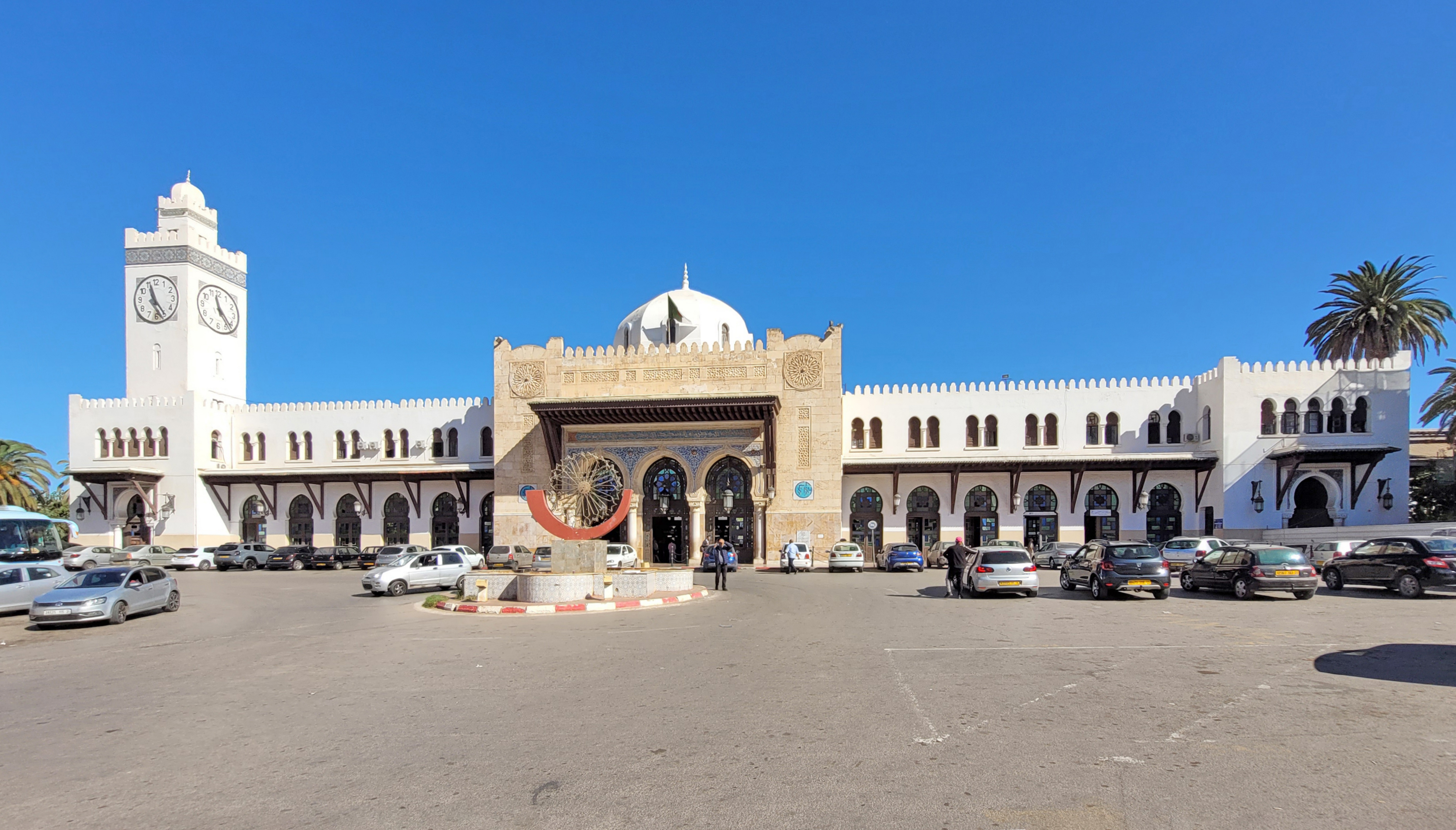
Railway station in Oran

The city's public transportation is centered on the Oran tramway centering in the city center and running south to Es-Senia. The Oran Metro is a planned metro system expected to be complete in 2026, ran by the Algiers Metro Company. There is an extensive network of "clandestine" taxis in the city. A project started in 2008/9 for the Oran Tram, a tramway system consisting of 32 stations over a distance of 18.7 km (11.6 mi) going to Es-Sénia, in the South and Sidi Maarouf in the east side, while passing by the centre town The tramway serves Haï Sabbah, University of Sciences and Technology (USTO), the Crossroads of the Three Private clinics, the Law courts, Dar El Baïda, the Plate-Saint Michel, the Place of 1 November, Saint-Anthony, Boulanger, Saint-Hubert, the 3rd Ring road and finally The University of Es-Sénia. The system was opened on 1 May 2013.

The Ahmed Ben Bella Airport, also known as Es-Senia Airport, serves both domestic and international flights, with frequent connections to the capital Algiers, served by the public airline company Air Algerie. The same company also has flights to many French cities (Marseille, Paris, Lyon, etc.) and other European and EMEA cities. The Es Senia Airport also serves passengers from most smaller towns in proximity to Oran (Sig, Mostaganem, Arzew, etc.). The airport building is a fairly limited construction and does not operate on a 24-h basis.

== Sports ==
Oran is represented in association football by MC Oran.

Oran held its first international marathon on 10 November 2005. The event, sponsored by Toyota of Algeria, attracted runners from Morocco, Libya, Spain, France and Kenya. The marathon served to publicize the health benefits of running and to provide a novel form of public entertainment for the city's residents.

The Championnat d'Afrique d'Athlétisme was scheduled to be held in Oran in June 2021.

The XIX Mediterranean Games was held in Oran in 2022.

== Culture ==
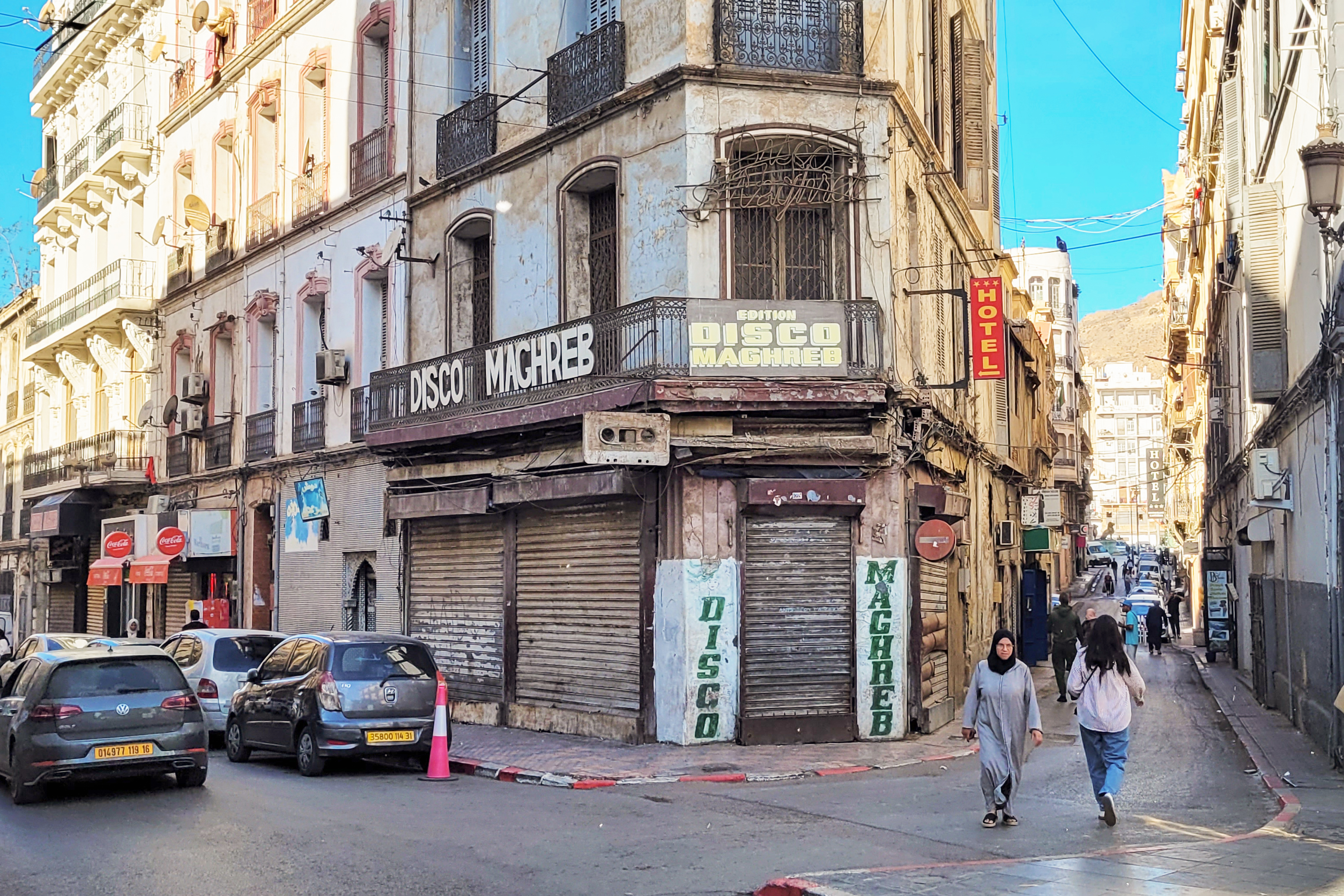
"Disco Maghreb" in Oran

The folk music Raï ("opinion" in Arabic), had its beginnings in Oran. This genre of music was formulated by shepherds in the 1930s through Arab and European influences. This music was surrounded by controversy due to women's key role in public performances of the music, as well as the hedonistic lyrics about love and alcohol. This led to strict governmental control in the area which led to arrests, injuries, and assassinations. Many notable Raï musicians (including Cheb Hasni, Cheb Khaled, and Rachid Taha) hail from Oran. The violinist Akim el Sikameya was also born in Oran. One of Oran's most famous emigrants is Yves Saint Laurent.

=== Cuisine ===
Créponné, a traditional Algerian lemon sorbet, originated in Oran. The French Algerian pastry oranais also originated here.

== Representation in other media ==
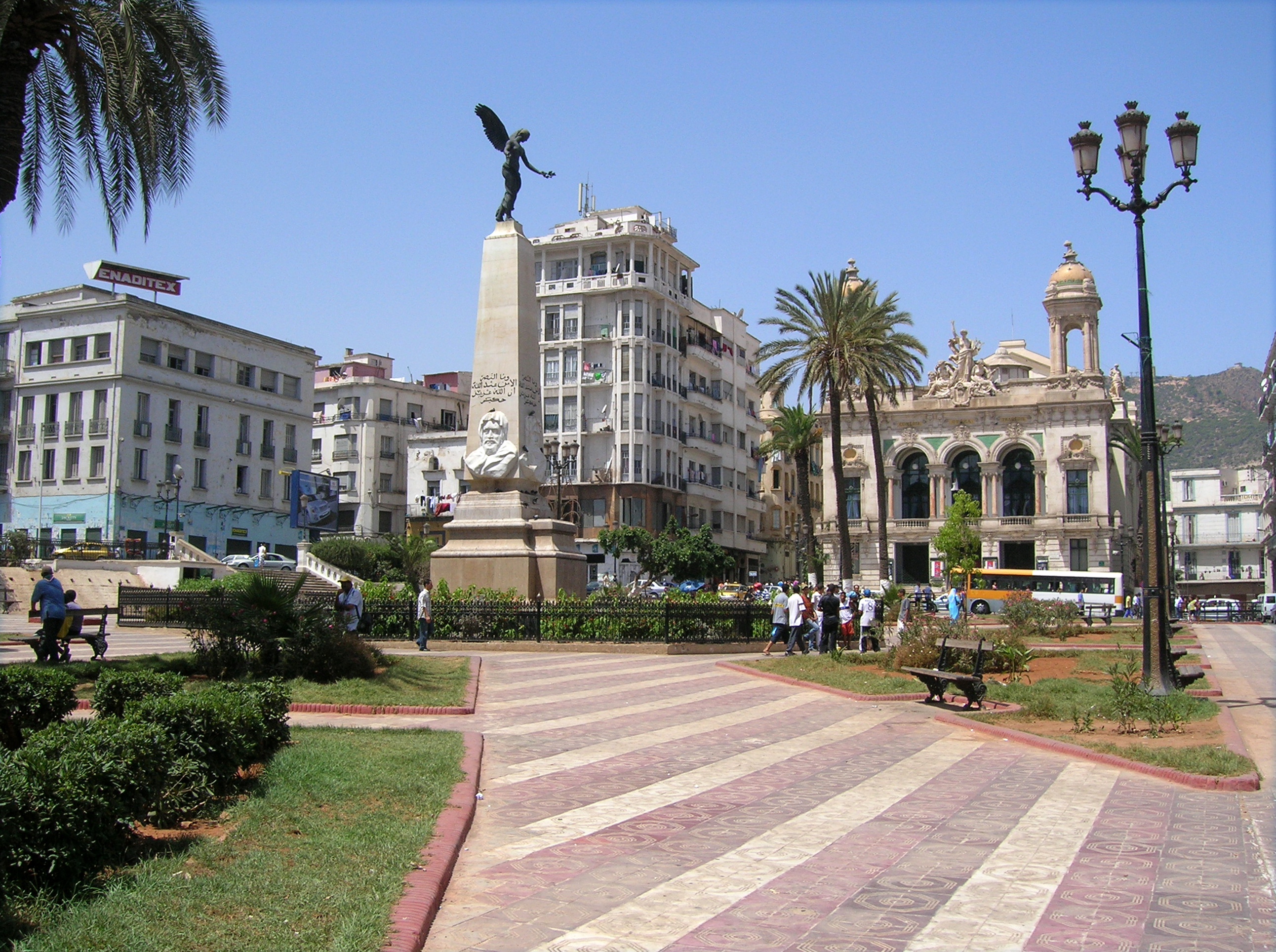
Place 1er novembre (ex.Place d'Armes)

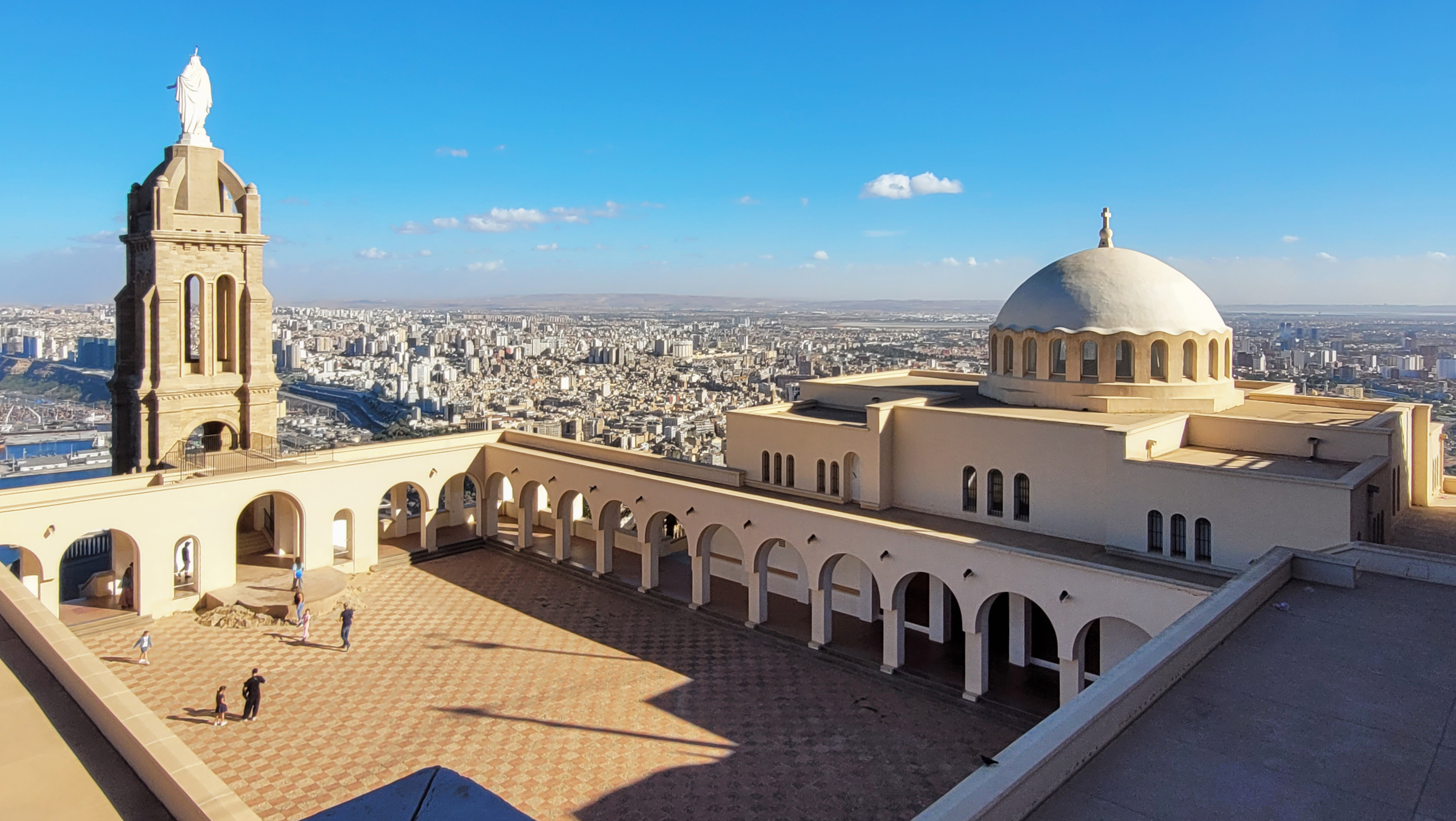
Chapelle Santa Cruz

- Albert Camus' 1939 essay The Minotaur describes life in Oran.
- Albert Camus' 1947 novel The Plague presents a fictional tale of observations of a physician during the emergence and recession of bubonic plague in the 1940s in Oran.
- El Gallardo Español (1615) by Miguel de Cervantes takes place in Oran. Other works from Cervantes mention the city, and during the first part of Don Quixote, the story of the captive takes place here.
- In the movie Casablanca (1942), the route for refugees fleeing to the Americas was Paris to Marseille, across the Mediterranean to Oran, then by train, auto or foot to Casablanca. If they acquired an exit visa, they went on to Lisbon from there.
- Paul Bowles' 1949 novel The Sheltering Sky mainly takes place in Oran.
- Part of Arturo Pérez-Reverte's Capitán Alatriste adventure novel, Corsarios de Levante (Pirates of the Levant, 2006), takes place in early 17th-century Oran. The action of the book occurs a few years after the forced expulsion of the last Moriscos (Spanish Christians of Muslim descent) from Valencia. Oran is featured as a sun-blasted North African military stronghold. Capitán Diego Alatriste finds Oran to be manned by an impoverished garrison of Spanish Christians, living alongside Muslims (some fiercely loyal to Spain), and Sephardic Jews, descendants of refugees from the 1492 expulsions from Spain.
- In the ITV drama series Hornblower, Lieutenant Hornblower is sent by Captain Pellew to Oran to obtain supplies, only to discover that the city was suffering from a bubonic plague epidemic.
- The heroine of Geraldine Brooks' novel, Year of Wonders, emigrates to Oran after leaving her home village that was quarantined in 1666 due to the plague.
- Joann Sfar's graphic novel The Rabbi's Cat 2 begins in Oran.
- Kamel Daoud's novel The Meursault Investigation is set in a bar in Oran.

== Economy and infrastructure ==
Oran has become a major trading centre for the wider area, serving Arzew, the area's oil/gas port as well as Sonatrach, the country's biggest oil and gas company. Sonelgaz has built a new congress centre in Oran and in 2010 the 16th International Conference & Exhibition on Liquefied Natural Gas was held in the city of Oran, which attracted around 3,000 visitors and major companies from around the world.

To accommodate all visitors, new hotels are currently being constructed and floating hotels will be used in the future. With a growth in urbanization, water quality and management is being harmed in Oran; this change in water quality is affecting marine life and the state of beaches in this tourism driven city.

The city and region participates in the R20 Regions of Climate Action, with goals focused on reduced waste valorization and energy efficiency.

=== Tourism ===
Oran has numerous hotels in all categories, from luxury to basic, as well as many restaurants offering Algerian specialities and other foods. Tourists will also find a variety of cinemas, arts centres, the regional theatre, an open-air theatre, the Museum, the historic city centre of Oran, the district of Sidi El Houari, the municipal gardens, Médina Djedida with its artisanal products, the cathedral, Djebel Murdjadjo, and nearby seaside resorts. Ahmed Ben Bella Airport is 11.9 km (7 3/8 mi) from the town centre. One can also reach Oran by ferries from the ports of Marseille, Sète, Alicante and Almería, via the national company Algérie Ferries. The Great Mosque is another attraction for tourists. The Great Mosque was built in 1796 to celebrate the end of Spanish rule of the city.

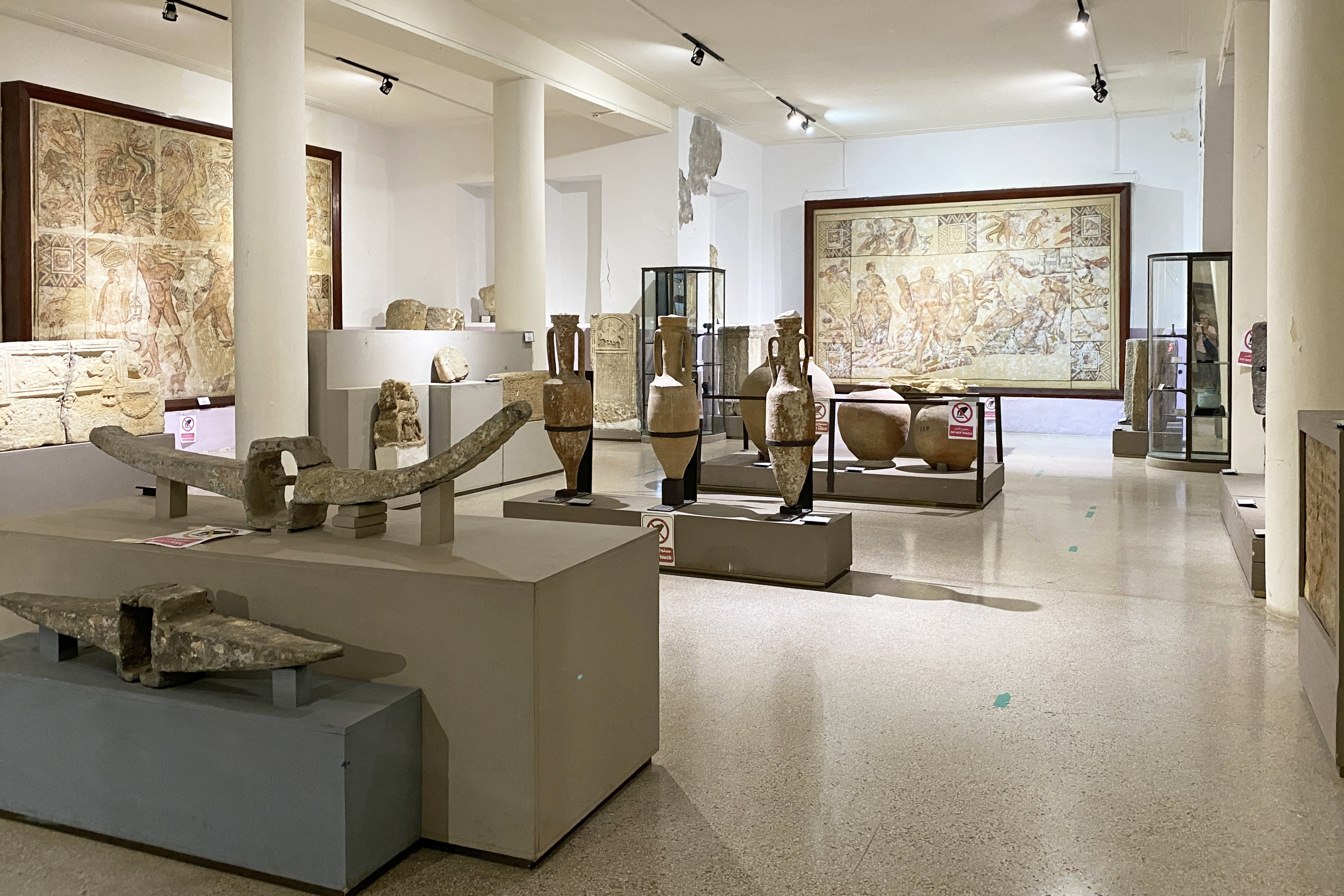
Ahmed Zabana National Museum

==== Attractions ====
The main museum in Oran is called Musée National Ahmend Zabana. Although often overlooked by tourists, it includes a natural history exhibit in addition to art pieces like mosaics and portraits.

Bey's Palace is another favorite spot for tourists, situated in Sidi al-Houari in the city center. It is an Ottoman era palace built of Islamic architecture, consists of harem, guard towers and stucco-painted halls.

=== Water ===
Water supply in Oran has historically been stressed because of the lack of consistent rainfall. The regional government invested in hydraulic projects in the 2010s to increase retention of water, and installing a desalination plant increased water security. Oran's region uses a mix of groundwater (11%), surface water (51%) and desalinization (38%). The wilaya of Oran is also equipped with five desalination plants, including the unit of Macta, with a maximum daily capacity of 500,000 m^{3}.

== International relations ==
=== Twin towns – sister cities ===
Oran is twinned with 21 cities:

- Alicante, Spain
- Bizerte, Tunisia
- Bordeaux, France (2003)
- Cairo, Egypt
- Casablanca, Morocco (1999)
- Dakar, Senegal
- Durban, South Africa
- Elche, Spain
- Gdańsk, Poland
- Havana, Cuba
- Jeddah, Saudi Arabia
- Leicester, England (2001)
- Lyon, France
- Metz, France
- Oujda, Morocco
- Rangpur, Bangladesh
- Seoul, South Korea
- Sfax, Tunisia (1989)
- Strasbourg, France (2013)
- Toulon, France
- Zarqa, Jordan

=== Partner cities ===
In addition, Oran has partnerships and cooperation with one city:

- Strasbourg, France (2013)

== Notable people ==
- Fatéma Bakhaï (born 1949), Algerian novelist and lawyer
- Kaddour Bekhloufi (1934–2019), played international football for FLN football team
- Miloud Mourad Benamara (born 1977), actor
- Jean Benguigui (born 1944), French actor
- Pierre Bénichou (1938–2020), French journalist
- Albert Camus (1913–1960), French philosopher, author, and journalist
- Alain Chabat (born 1958), French actor, director, screenwriter, producer and TV presenter
- Étienne Daho (born 1956), French singer
- Sidi El Houari (1350–1439), imam and patron saint of the city of Oran
- Jean-Pierre Elkabbach (1937–2023), French journalist
- Maurice El Mediouni (1928–2024), pianist, composer and interpreter of Andalusian, Raï, Sephardic and Arab music
- Kader Firoud (1919–2005), professional footballer and manager
- Miloud Hadefi (1949–1994), international footballer and manager
- Abderrahmane Hadj-Salah (1928–2017), linguist
- Cheb Hasni (1968–1994), Raï singer
- Blaoui Houari (1926–2017), singer-songwriter, composer and conductor
- Khaled (born 1960), prominent Raï singer and multi-instrumentalist
- Mustapha Moussa (born 1962), former boxer, first Algerian Olympic medalist
- Armand Mouyal (1925–1988), French world champion épée fencer
- Yves Saint Laurent (1936–2008), French fashion designer
- Paul Maurice Pallary (1869–1942), malacologist and arachnologist, died in Oran
- Henri Stambouli (born 1961), former footballer and current manager
- Ahmed Zabana (1926–1956), nationalist militant who participated in the outbreak of the Algerian War

== See also ==
- Cebon
- European enclaves in North Africa before 1830
- Dhaya
- Sebkha of Oran
