= Cebon =

Algerian food company

- Type: SARL
- Industry: Food industry
- Founded: 1997; 29 years ago, Algeria
- Headquarters: Fouka, Tipaza Province, Algeria
- Products: El Mordjene
- Website: cebon.dz

Cebon (Arabic: سيبون) is an Algerian foods company that produces foods under the El Mordjene (Arabic: المرجان) brand. It is best known for its hazelnut spreads, also known as simply El Mordjene, which went viral in France in 2024.

Its head office is in Fouka, Tipaza Province.

== History ==
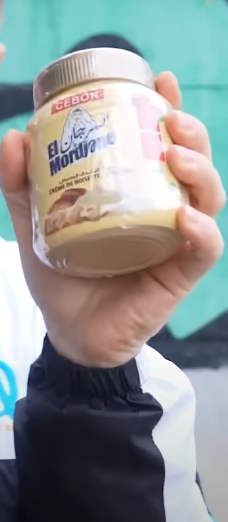
Mordjene hazelnut spread

Cebon was founded in 1997 in Oran, Algeria as a family business, incorporated as a société à responsabilité limitée (SARL, a type of limited-liability company). It produces food products under the brand El Mordjene, such as spreads, honey, whipped cream, food coloring, vegetable fat, powdered sugar, and corn starch.

Due to a viral trend on social media like TikTok, initially through Algerian influencers and later those from the Algerian diaspora, the company experienced a surge in demand for its spread products in 2024, which had been produced since 2021. It was also tested by French influencers. In France, where it was sold by select grocery stores and imported via the shuttle trade, it quickly sold out. This high demand drove up prices in France.

By 2025 the French Ministry of Agriculture banned the product, and the European Union banned the importation of El Mordjene in EU territory. This caused issues in Algeria-France relations, and Lauren Collins of The New Yorker wrote that, citing Ferrero's existing dominance of Nutella and a belief that a motive could be to protect Nutella, "some see [the ban] as politically motivated." The Ministry of Agriculture stated that the ban was based on EU food safety laws regulating the import of dairy products from Algeria.

== Awards ==
The range of spreads was voted product of the year by a panel of Algerian consumers in 2022, 2023, and 2024.

== Products ==
The hazelnut spread El Mordjene has been unofficially dubbed an "Algerian Nutella".
