= Oran Metro =

Proposed rapid transit railway in Oran, Algeria

Overview
- Native name: مترو وهران
- Locale: Oran, Algeria
- Transit type: Rapid transit
- Number of lines: 1 line

Operation
- Began operation: TBA
- Operator: Algiers Metro Company

Technical
- System length: 19.66 km (12.2 mi)
- Track gauge: 1,000 mm (3 ft 3 3/8 in)

The Oran Metro (Arabic : مترو وهران) is a proposed extensive network of rapid transit electrified railway lines that will run primally underground in central Oran and into the city's suburbs. It will be part of the larger public transport system of Oran, the second largest city in Algeria.

== History ==
The Oran metro project was launched in 2008, with its construction then planned to start in 2014. Phase 1, with a length of 10.8 km (6.7 mi), will start south of Oran and go to Hai Badr district then cross Mouahidine before meeting the Oran tramway in Sidi El Bachir. The route would then serve the SNTF railway station and the headquarters of the Wilaya of Oran. The Metro will then continue north east of the city along Hai Mactaa Gambetta and finally along the Millennium Boulevard and arrive at Bir El Djir.

In January 2014, despite the technical study not being completed, it was announced that a tender involving international bidders would be launched for the first section, after the finalisation of the technical study. The first section, which would have a length of 12.8 km (8.0 mi) and 13 stations was then estimated to open for public operation by 2020.

In March 2014, the director of transportation of the Oran Wilaya, with representatives of the project owner Enterprise Metro d'Alger (EMA) advised that the technical study had been finalized. The expected cost of the project was estimated to be 138 billion Algerian dinars (1.3 billion euros) and would have a length of 19.66 kilometres (12.22 mi) and comprise 20 stations. The start of construction was scheduled for the end of 2014 for the first stage.
