= Aubert Library of Oran =

Library in Oran, Algeria

The Aubert Library is a library located in Oran, Algeria. It holds 26,000 volumes.

== See also ==
- List of libraries in Algeria
