= Sebkha of Oran =

Salt lake in Algeria

Coordinates: 35°32′N 0°47′W

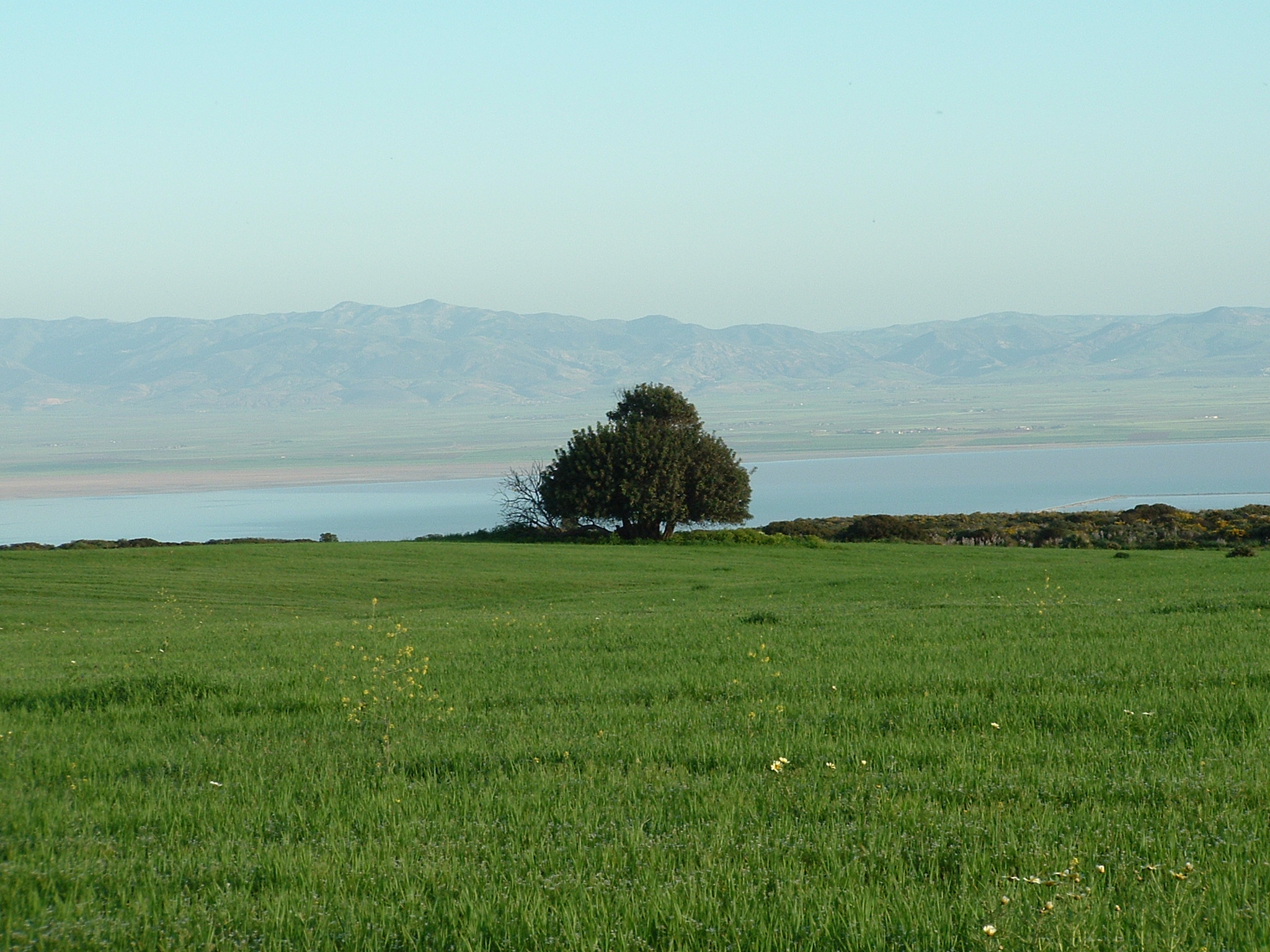
- Interactive map of Sebkha of Oran
- Basin countries: Algeria
- Settlements: Misserghin

The Sebkha of Oran is a salt lake located within the territory of the municipality of Misserghin, in the province of Oran, Algeria.

== Geography ==
The Sebkha of Oran is a lake located 15 km south of Oran in the municipality of Misserghin, and it is about 12 km away from the Mediterranean Sea. It is a depression situated at an altitude of 110 meters, bounded to the north by the Murdjajo Massif and to the south by the Tessala Massif. The sebkha occupies the bottom of this depression, appearing to have a flat topography but slightly inclined towards the west, with a low point at 80 meters above sea level and a high point at 82 meters. It has an elliptical shape, approximately 40 km in length with a southwest–northeast orientation, and a width ranging from 6 to 13 km.

The lake is fed by a hydrographic network primarily flowing from the Tessala and Murdjajo Massifs. However, the water in this area is saline. The lake, which forms a thin layer of water ranging from 10 to 30 cm depending on the rainfall, completely dries up during the summer due to high evaporation rates and the region's drought. The climate is semi-arid Mediterranean, with annual precipitation ranging between 378 and 473 mm.

The surrounding lands near the lake are used for agriculture. The salt from the lake has negative effects on the southern fringes of the Oran agglomeration as well as the runways of Oran Airport.

The Sebkha of Oran has been recognized as a Ramsar site since February 2, 2001. According to Emberger, the climate in Es Senia is classified as semi-arid.

== Flora ==
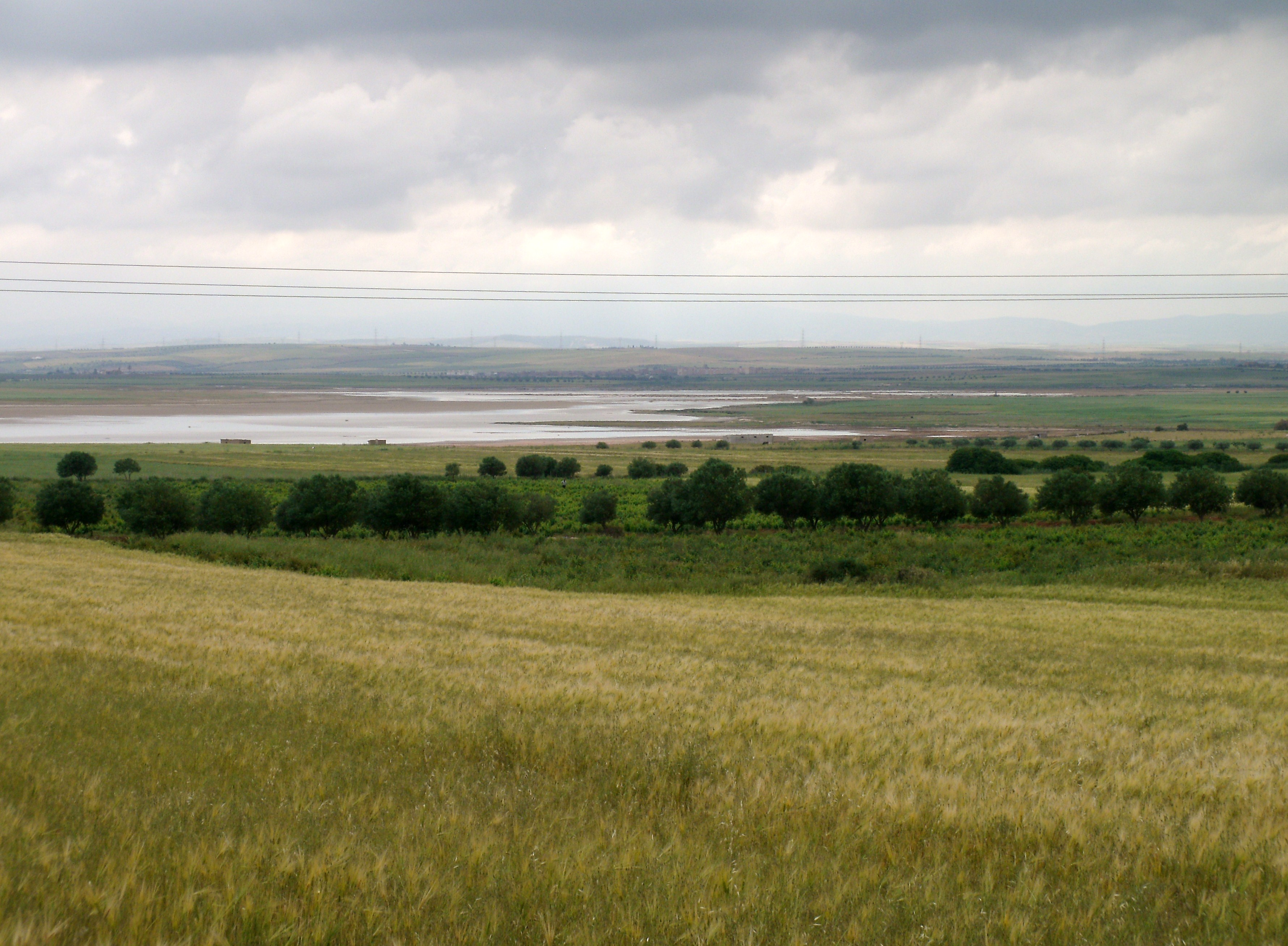
Flora at Sebkha Oran

The halophytic vegetation of this vast sebkha has been the subject of several in-depth scientific studies. According to K. Bahi, it is evident that "the wetlands in the Oran region exhibit a floristic biodiversity that deserves protection and conservation."

The surrounding watersheds of the sebkha are covered with Aleppo pine forests, eucalyptus, cork oak, and thuja.

== Fauna ==
Numerous migratory bird species reside in the wetlands of western Oran. The lake is home to two significant bird species, often exceeding the 1% international threshold: the greater flamingo and the northern shoveler. For example, in February 1972, 1,450 flamingos were counted. Depending on food availability, these birds may move between this lake, the marshes of Macta, and the Sebkha of Arzew (Johnson, in litt.).

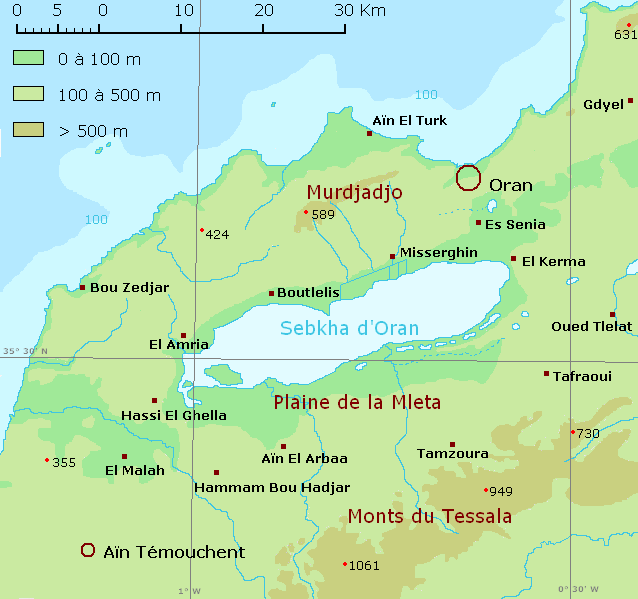
Topographic map of the basin of the Sebkha of Oran.

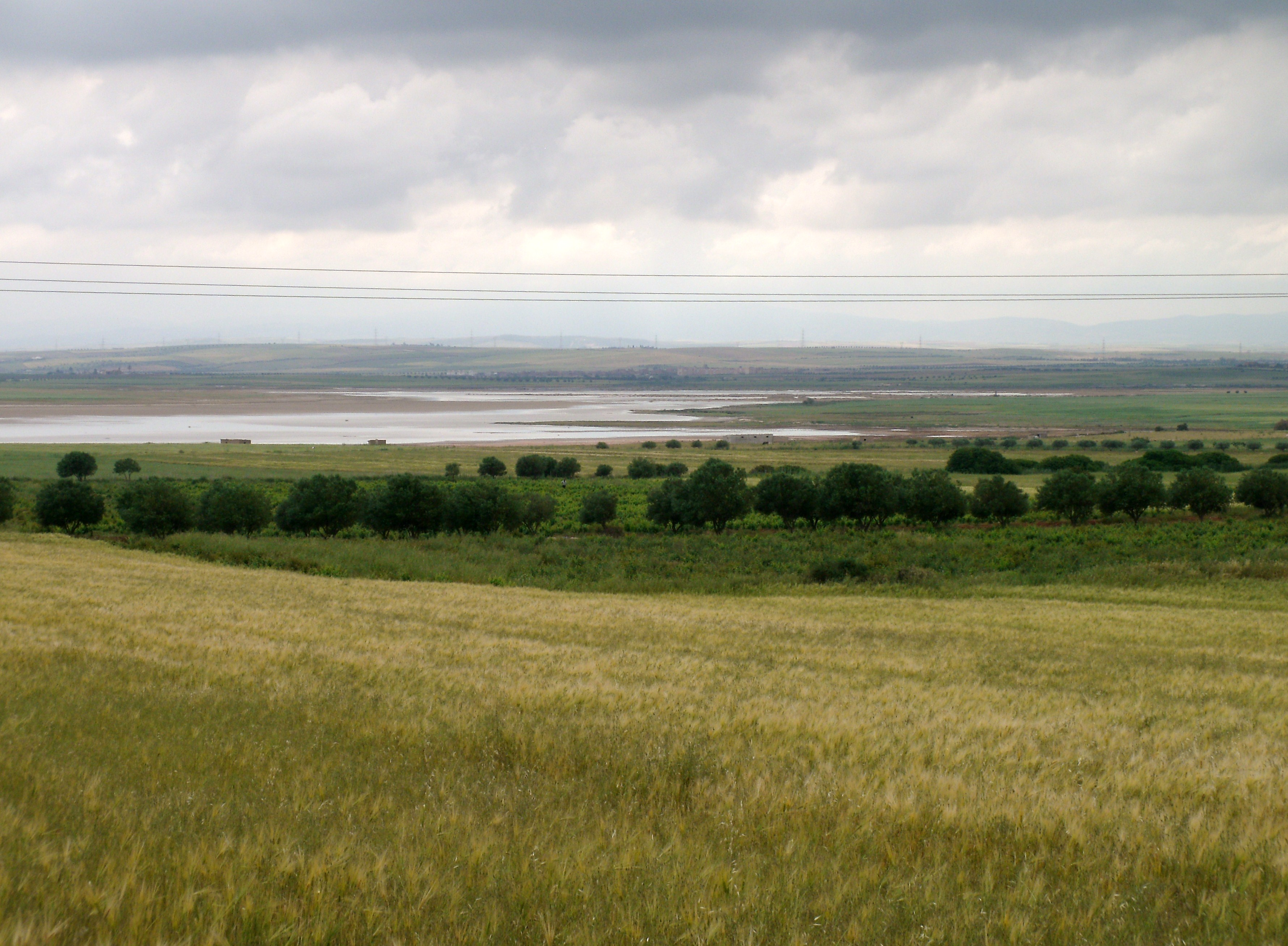
The Sebkha near Hassi El Ghella.

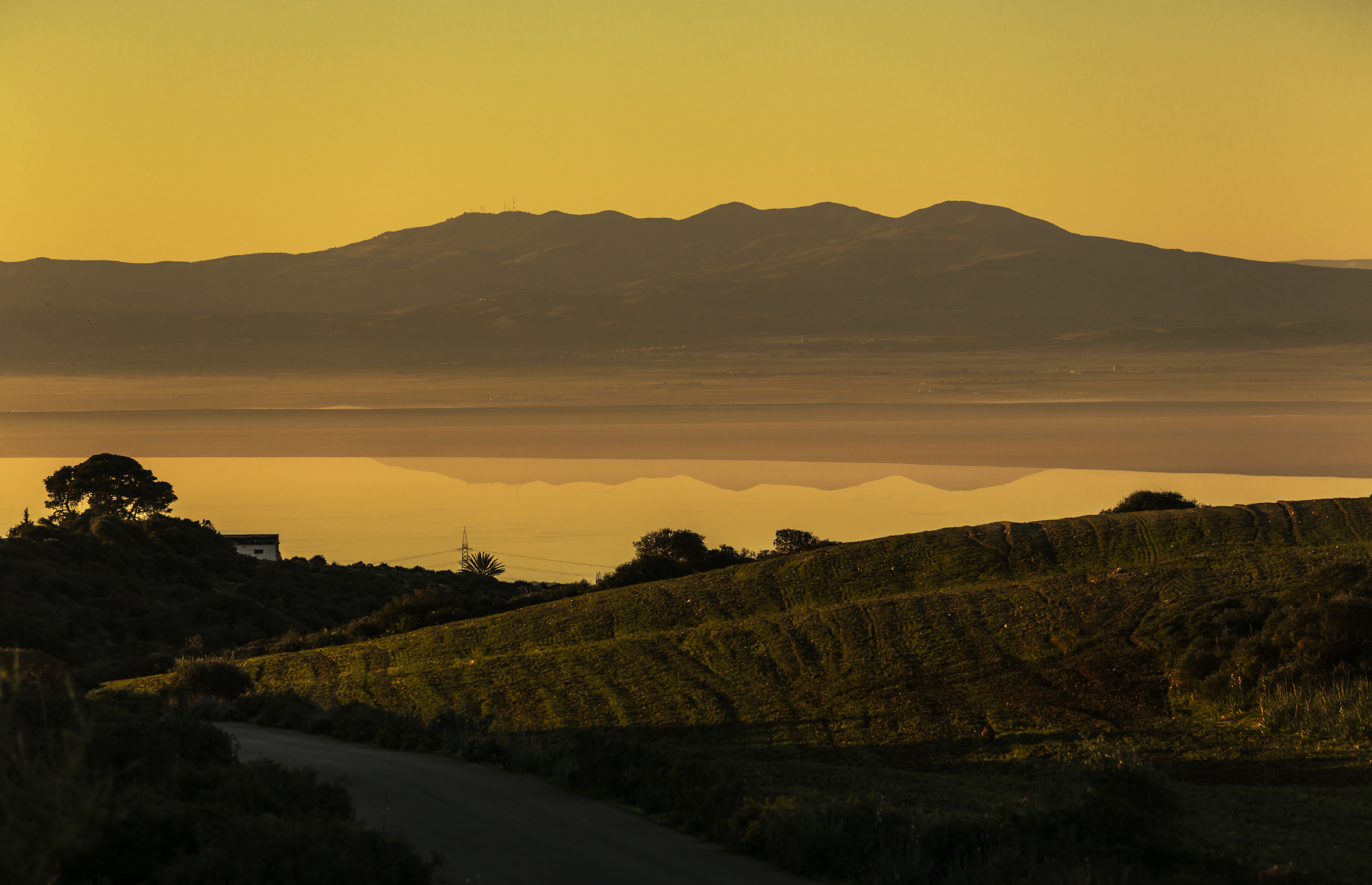

== See also ==
- Sebkha el Melah, Béni Abbès
