= Siege of Oran (1700-1701) =

- Part of Conflicts between the Regency of Algiers and Morocco
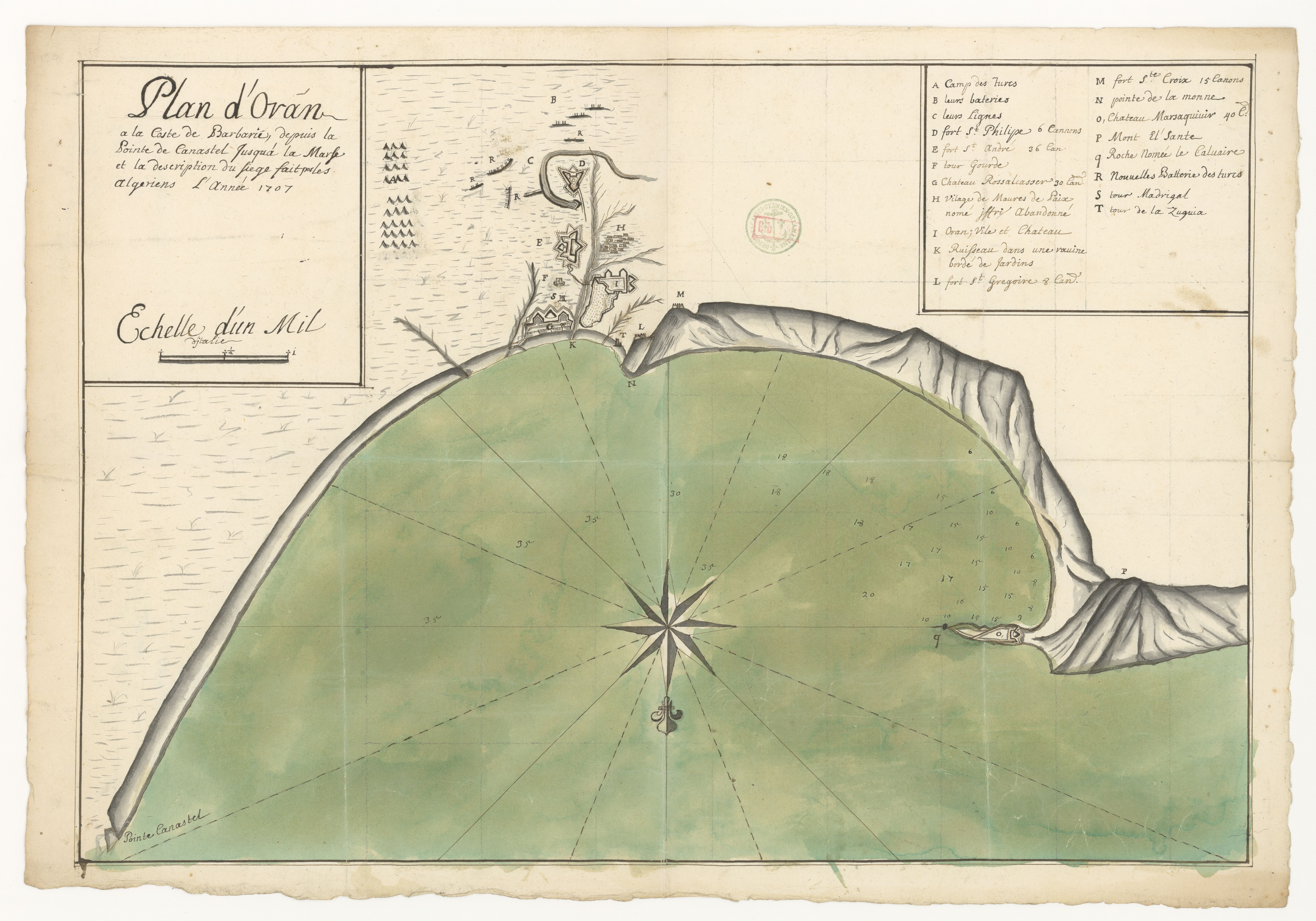
- Map of Oran in 1707
Date	1700-1701
Location	Arzew, Algeria
Result	Algerian victory

Belligerents
Alawi Sultanate	Regency of Algiers

Commanders and leaders
Moulay Ismail	Hadj Moustapha

Strength
13,000 men	Unknown

Casualties and losses
Heavy losses	Unknown

The Siege of Oran (1700-1701) was an attempt made by Moulay Ismail to liberate the fortified city of Oran from its Spanish yoke and annex it to his own kingdom.

Moulay Ismail previously besieged Oran in 1693 without success, however he led another campaign against the city in 1700. Since the earlier siege of Oran a series of conflicts ensued between the Alawites and the Algerians. In 1700 Moulay Ismail's forces were defeated in the Battle of al-Kawiya where his commander Abdullah ibn Ahmidah and many others died. Moulay Ismail himself was defeated shortly after near a place called al-Jadwiya in the Battle of Chelif where he was wounded by the Algerian army who returned to Algiers with great spoils. This battle was spoken of by the French consul in Salé and a letter to the French minister noted that Dey Mustafa defeated the Moroccans in April.

Moulay Ismail once again prepared another campaign, this time against Oran. His preparations began in 1700, although according to the account of his son, Moulay Muhammad, it was after the Battle of al-Jadwiya that he marched on Oran. Another account corroborates this date, stating that his action against Oran was a face-saving measure following his defeat at al-Jadwiya. Moulay Ismail's aim was to annex Oran to his own kingdom. One account states that he descended upon Mount Hidour and set his guard on it while another states that he pitched his tents around Oran and sought help but with no success from Muslims in the area.

In 1701, an Algerian garrison adjacent to Oran intercepted the army of Moulay Ismail and defeated him near Arzeu. The Algerians fired canons that surprised his army and caused heavy losses for the Moroccans.

Despite this defeat, Moulay Ismail would again launch another expedition against Oran in 1707 in which he suffered another heavy defeat.
