= Siege of Oran =

Siege of Oran may refer to:

- Siege of Oran (1509) : the Spanish Empire conquers the city in May 1509 from the Kingdom of Tlemcen
- Siege of Oran (1556) : failed Ottoman siege against the Spanish
- Siege of Oran (1563) : the Regency of Algiers fails to retake the city from the Spanish
- Siege of Oran (1675–1678) : failed siege by the Regency of Algiers against the Spanish
- Siege of Oran (1693) : failed attack by the Sultanate of Morocco
- Siege of Oran (1707–1708) : Mustapha Bouchelaghem captures Oran from the Spanish, tied up in the War of Spanish Succession
- Siege of Oran (1732) : Spain retake the city.
- Siege of Oran (1790–92) : The Ottomans retake the city from the Spanish

== See also ==
- Battle of Oran (1942) : Allied troops conquer Oran from Vichy France in Operation Torch during World War II
