= Battle of al-Kawiya =

- Part of Conflicts between the Regency of Algiers and Morocco
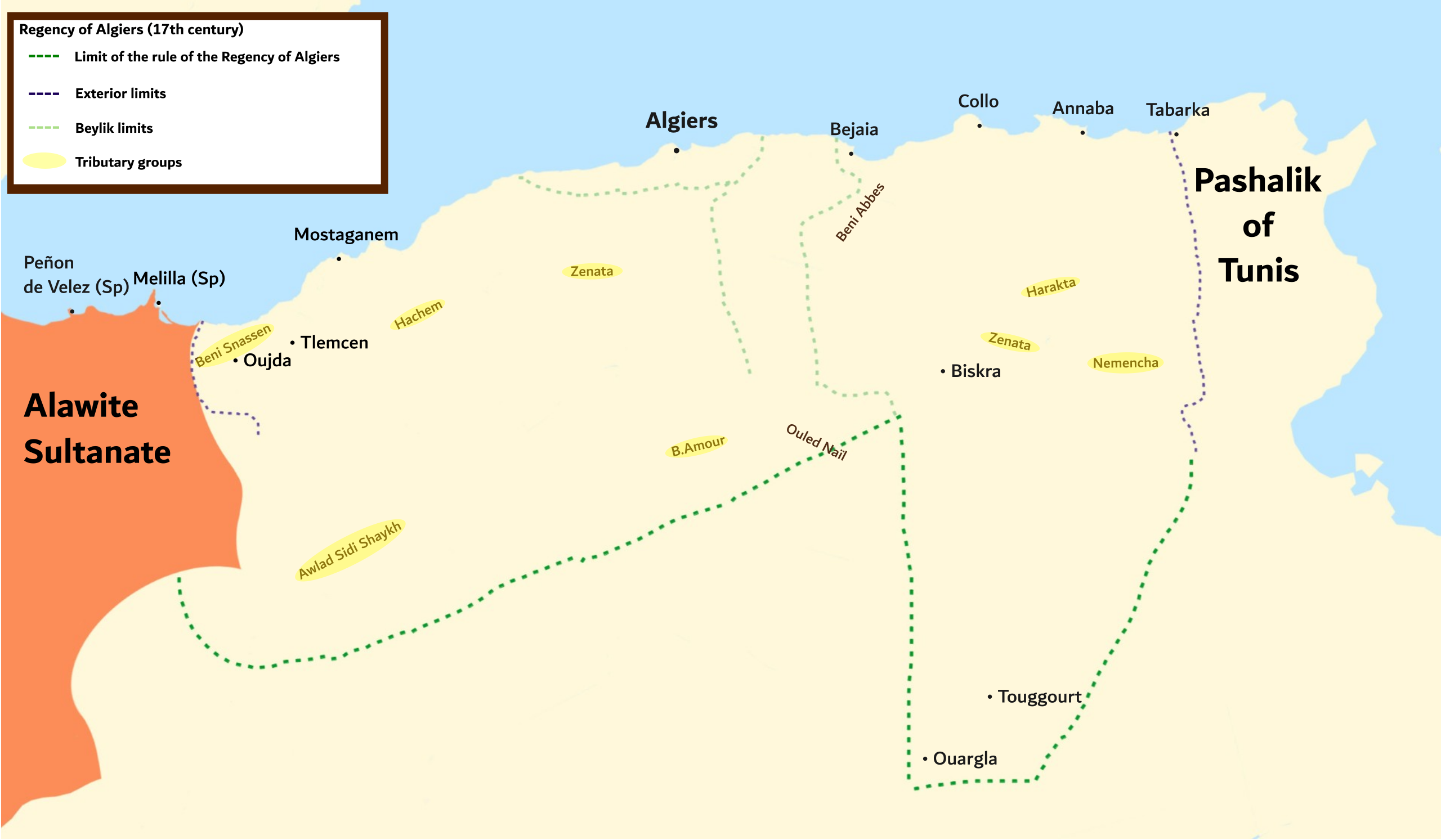
- Map depicting the Regency of Algiers in the 17th century
Date	September, 1700
Location	al-Kawiya, near the Chelif river
Result	Algerian victory

Belligerents
Alawi Sultanate	Regency of Algiers

Commanders and leaders
Mansur ibn al-Rami †; Abdullah ibn Ahmidah †	Hadj Moustapha

Strength
Unknown	Unknown

Casualties and losses
12,000 killed Large number of Alawi commanders killed	Unknown

The Battle of al-Kawiya was a military conflict between the Alawi Sultanate and the Regency of Algiers in September, 1700. The Moroccans suffered a defeat and heavy casualties including a large number of commanders.

== Background ==
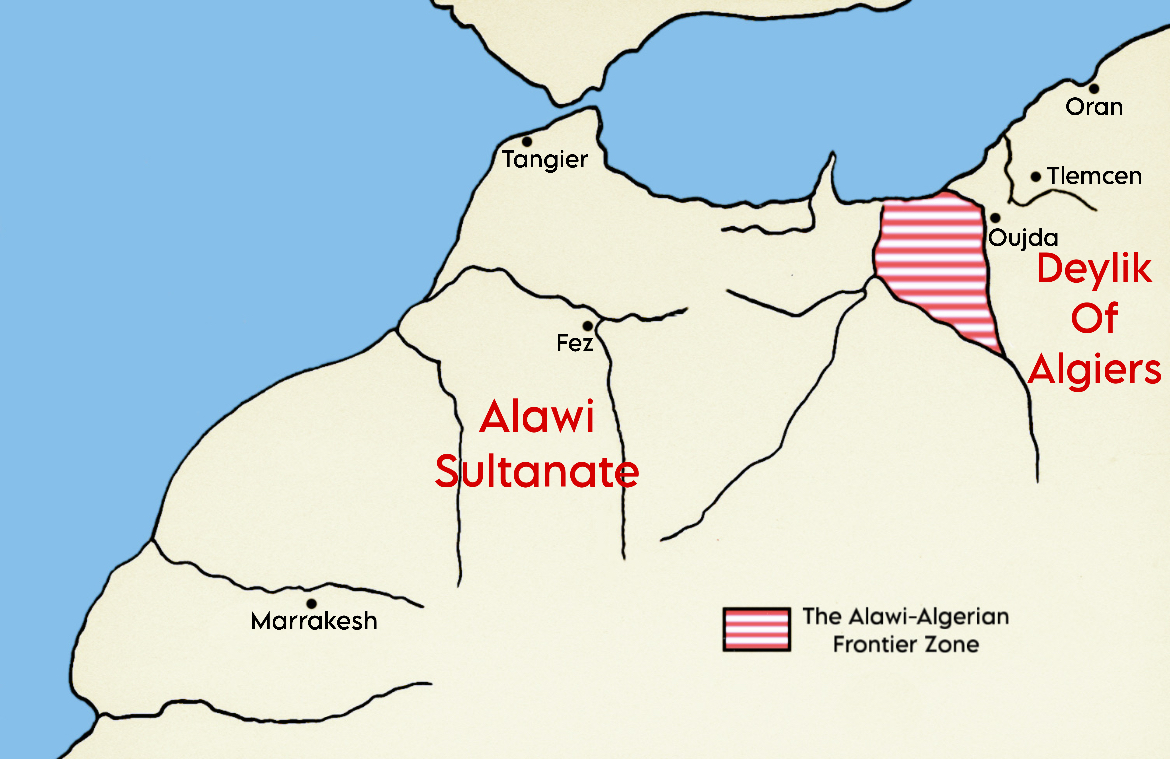
Map depicting the Algerian-Alawi frontier

Constant raids and offensives into Algerian territory ultimately led to a number of military engagements between the Alawi forces and the Algerians. After a victory in the Battle of Moulouya a treaty was concluded fixing the boundary between the two states at the Moulouya river. Despite this agreement, the Moroccan forces continued their raids into Algerian territory resulting in an engagement and defeat in 1694 and another in 1696 in the Battle of Tlemcen. The Moroccans concluded an alliance with the Tunisians against the Algerians and thereon continued their raids.

== Battle ==
Ibn al-Rami, the Alawi commander and leader of the raiding forces, led an expedition into Algerian territory. According to al-Rifi, the Moroccan forces reached al-Kawiya and remained there for nine months consuming the crops and plundering wealth until a great battle took place resulting in the death of a large number of Moroccan commanders. Ibn al-Rami was surprised by the Algerian battalion and defeated by them in September 1700. A night long artillery bombardment followed by a sweeping attack in the morning was employed resulting in the defection of the Arab tribes allied to the Alawites and a decisive victory with 12,000 killed as well as a large number of Moroccan commanders. The commanders ibn al-Rami and ibn-Ahmidah were both killed in battle, although another account mentions that al-Rami deserted to the Algerians following his defeat.

== Aftermath ==
The Moroccans continued their offensives into Algerian territory. An attempt to seize Oran resulted in a battle in 1701 where Moulay Ismail was defeated near Arzew. Oran was attacked once more in 1707, this time an engagement occurred at Zebouja where Moulay Ismail suffered a heavy defeat.
