= Spanish Oran =

Imperial territory North Africa

Spanish Oran Orán español (Spanish) وهران الإسبانية (Arabic)
- 1509–1708; 1732–1792
- Flag

- Present-day borders of Oran
- Status: Territory of the Spanish Empire
- Capital: Oran
- Religion: Roman Catholicism
- History
  - Spanish conquest: 1509
  - Algerian reconquest: 1708
  - Spanish conquest: 1732
  - Algerian reconquest: 1792
Preceded by	Succeeded by
1509; Kingdom of Tlemcen; 1732; Regency of Algiers	1708; Regency of Algiers; 1792; Regency of Algiers
- Today part of: Algeria

Spanish Oran (Arabic: وهران الإسبانية; Spanish: Orán español) was a territory of the Spanish Empire as a result of the Conquest of Oran.

== History ==
The conquest was carried out by the Spanish Empire on the Kingdom of Tlemcen. The expedition was carried out with 80 naos and 10 galleys which carried about 8,000–12,000 infantry men and 3,000–4,000 cavalry men.

The territory was lost to Bey Mustapha Bin Youssef who took advantage of the War of Spanish Succession, to besiege the city in 1707. The city fell in 1708.

In 1732, Spanish forces recaptured Oran under José Carrilo de Albornoz and maintained control for the next six decades.

In 1790, forces of the Deylik of Algeria under Mohammed el-Kebir took advantage of an earthquake and besieged the city once again. In 1792 the Spanish troops retreated from the city ending Spanish rule over the city.

The town stayed under Ottoman control until 1831, when it was conquered by the Kingdom of France.
