= Raid on Nassau (1720) =

Spanish raid in the War of the Quadruple Alliance

- Part of War of the Quadruple Alliance
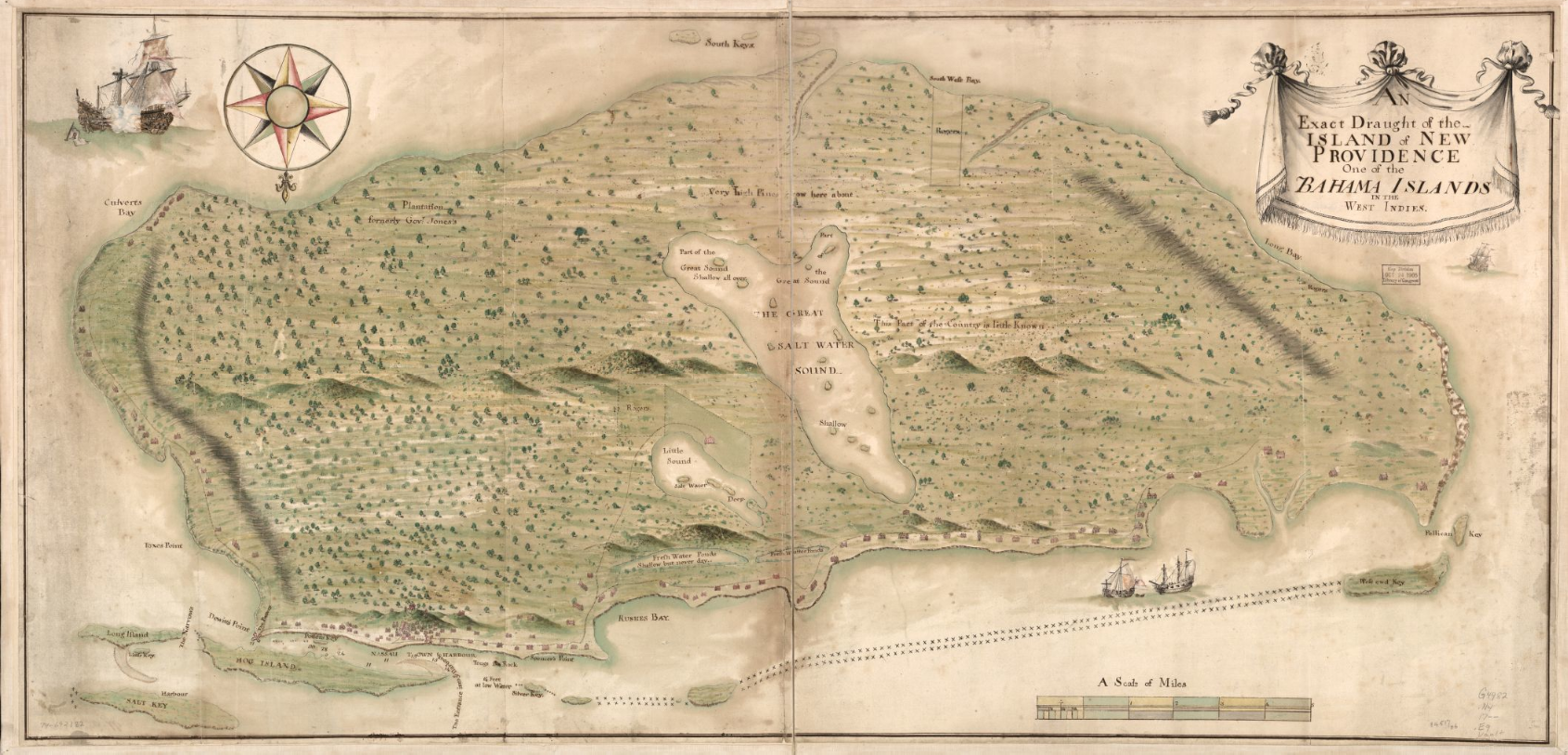
- Map of New Providence, Nassau and Hog Island in the North East, or lower left corner
Date	24 February – 1 March 1720
Location	Nassau, Bahamas, British West Indies 25.06°N 77.345°W
Result	British victory

Belligerents
Spain	Great Britain

Commanders and leaders
Francisco Javier Cornejo; José Cordero	Woodes Rogers; Captain Hildesley

Strength
3 frigates 9 brigantines & sloops 1,300–2,000	2 frigates 600 troops

Casualties and losses
1 sloop wrecked	Unknown

The Raid on Nassau took place from 24 February to 1 March 1720, at the end of the 1718 to 1720 War of the Quadruple Alliance. A Spanish expeditionary force attacked the British settlement of Nassau, Bahamas, but was repulsed.

== Background ==
In 1718, former privateer Captain Woodes Rogers was appointed Governor of the Bahamas, in which role he suppressed pirates, reformed the civil administration and restored trade. In February 1719, he learned the Spanish intended to conquer the Bahamas, but instead they were diverted to recapture Pensacola from the French. This gave him time to further consolidate his position by rebuilding Fort Nassau, which was completed in January 1720.

By then, in the Caribbean there was armed aggression between British and Spanish ships due to the clandestine trade of the former; this increased with the outbreak of the War of the Quadruple Alliance. In fact the Treaty of The Hague ending the war had been signed just before the raid although not yet in effect.

The governor of Cuba, Gregorio Guazo, seeing how Rogers continued to colonise the Bahamas, organised a military force to capture Nassau. Three Spanish frigates of the Armada de Barlovento were to form the backbone of the fleet under the command of Francisco Javier Cornejo. This naval element was further bolstered by nine privateer vessels including brigantines and sloops. The land forces consisted of approximately 1,300–2,000 men with a range of military experience, as well as 1,400 regular soldiers.

== Raid ==
At the end of February 1720, Cornejo's expeditionary force left Havana and sailed through the Florida Straits to capture New Providence. Rogers had assembled around sixty guns in Fort Nassau, along with a hundred soldiers and some five hundred local militia. He also had two frigates available, the 32-gun Felicia, and 24-gun HMS Flamborough under Captain Jonathan Hildesley.

The Spanish attacked from the north, leaving Principle and Hercules, their two large warships, at anchor in deep water. On February 24, Cornejo appeared off Nassau harbour in the 36-gun San Jose, and a number of smaller warships including the San Cristoforo and eight sloops. Their arrival took the British by surprise, but Cornejo did not immediately attack due to the presence of Delicia and Flamborough, although Rogers had to persuade Hildesley to stay. Cornejo delayed until next day, when a storm forced the Spanish to cut their cables and head for the open sea.

The Spanish made another attempt, this time avoiding the heavy defences of Fort Nassau. They cruised along Hog Island which sheltered the city's harbour, to the east and west in order to block the entrance. On the night of 25 February, the Spanish attempted to land three columns on the backside of Hog island and cross the narrow eastern channel in small boats. Quietly they rowed toward the shore, but were spotted by two sentries in a small redoubt who opened fire. Realising surprise was lost, the Spanish retreated out of range.

A second force landed in the west, causing considerable damage to outlying property, before they ran into opposition from the 500 militia, and also withdrew. Later that day, another storm forced the Spanish fleet out to sea, with San Cristoforo wrecked on the Bahama Banks. By 1 March, they were back in Havana, having captured over a hundred slaves and considerable booty.

== Aftermath ==
Rogers was unaware of Cornejo's departure until several weeks later, when he received news that the Spanish fleet had been hit by a storm. Despite their victory, he was unable to pay his garrison. Having expended his own fortune on Nassau's defences and with his health failing, Rogers left for Charleston, South Carolina on 6 December 1720, then set sail for London in March 1721. He arrived three months later to find a new governor had been appointed in his stead, and was imprisoned for debt.

== Sources ==
- Cordingly, David (2012). Spanish Gold: Captain Woodes Rogers and the True Story of the Pirates of the Caribbean. A&C Black. ISBN 978-1-4088-2216-6.
- De la Pezuela, Jacobo (1868). Historia de la isla de Cuba (in Spanish). Vol. II. Madrid: C. Bailly-Baillière.
- Fernández Duro, Cesáreo (1900). Armada Española desde la unión de los reinos de Castilla y Aragón (in Spanish). Vol. VI. Madrid, España: Instituto de Historia y Cultura Naval.
- Little, Bryan (1960). Crusoe's Captain. Odhams Press.
- Marley, David (1998). Wars of the Americas: A Chronology of Armed Conflict in the New World, 1492 to the Present. Santa Barbara, USA: ABC-CLIO. ISBN 0-87436-837-5.
- Pringle, Patrick (2012). Jolly Roger. Courier Corporation. ISBN 978-0-486-14759-8.
- Riley, Sandra; Peters, Thelma (2000). Homeward Bound: A History of the Bahama Islands to 1850 with a Definitive Study of Abaco in the American Loyalist Plantation Period. Riley Hall. ISBN 978-0-9665310-2-2.
- Sainsbury, William Noel; Fortescue, Sir John William; Headlam, Cecil, eds. (1933). Calendar of State Papers Colonial, America and West Indies: Volume 32, 1720–1721. Longman, Green, Longman & Roberts.
- Sherry, Frank (1986). Raiders and Rebels: The Golden Age of Piracy. Quill. ISBN 978-0-688-07515-6.
- Thomas, Graham A (2009). Pirate Hunter: The Life of Captain Woodes Rogers. Casemate Publishers. ISBN 978-1-84468-985-9.
- Woodard, Colin (2014). The Republic of Pirates: Being the true and surprising story of the Caribbean pirates and the man who brought them down. Pan Macmillan. ISBN 978-1-4472-4608-4.
- West, Matthew (2015). The Pirates. New Word City. ISBN 978-1-61230-896-8.
