= Juan José Navarro, 1st Marquess of Victoria =

The Most Excellent The Marquess of Victoria OSJ
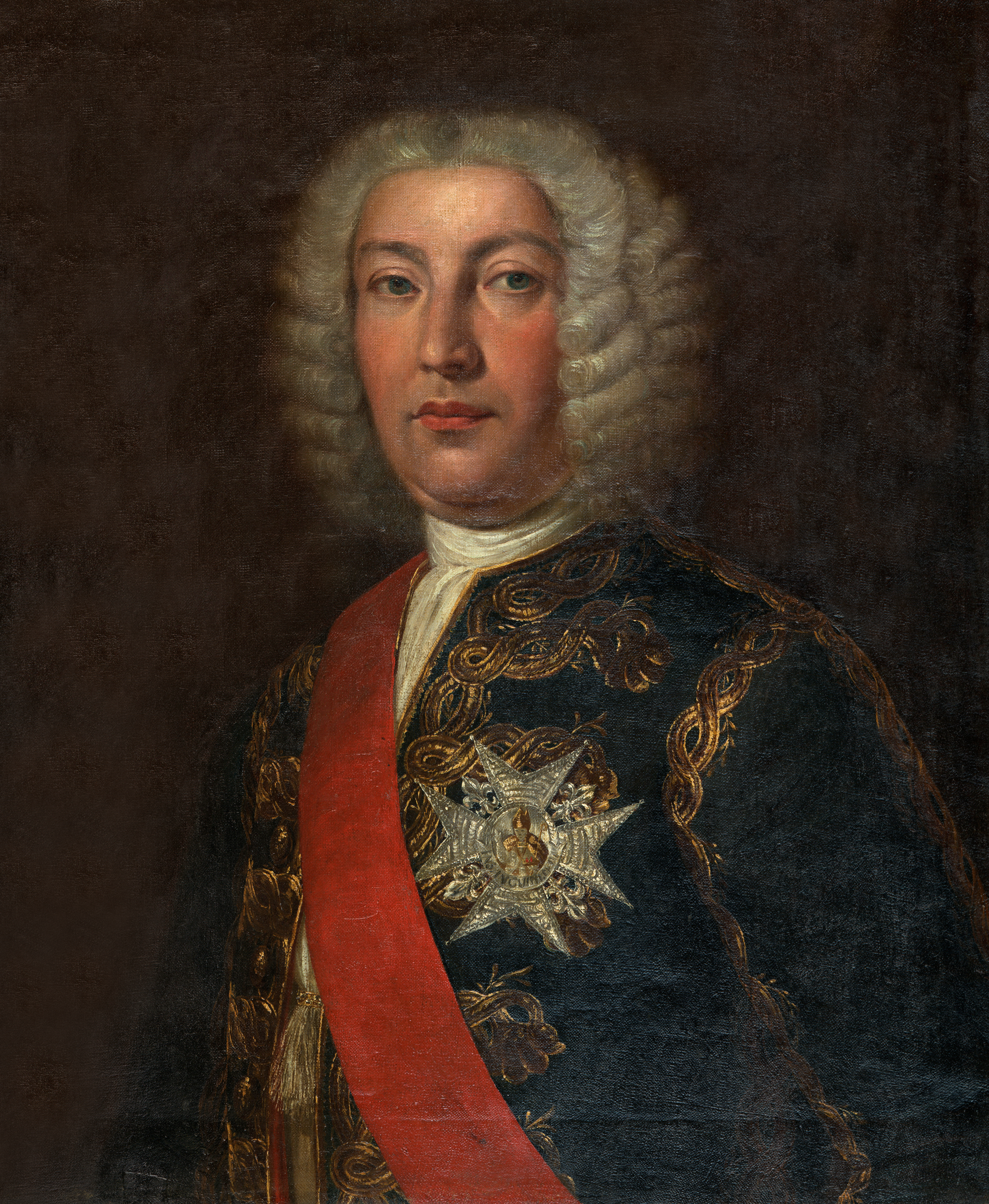
- Portrait by Rafael Tegeo, 1828

Captain general of the Navy
- In office 1750–1772
- Preceded by: Office established
- Succeeded by: Luis de Córdova y Córdova

Personal details
- Born: 30 November 1687 Messina, Sicily
- Died: 5 February 1772 (aged 84) Cádiz, Spain
- Spouse: María Josefa Gauset (m. 1711)
- Children: 2

Military service
- Allegiance: Spain
- Branch/service: Spanish Army (1695–1715); Spanish Navy (1717–1772)
- Years of service: 1695–1772
- Rank: Admiral (Spanish Navy)
- Battles/wars: Siege of Oran (1707–1708); War of the Spanish Succession; Battle of Luzzara; Siege of Turin; Battle of Almenar; Battle of Zaragoza; War of the Quadruple Alliance; Battle of Cape Passaro; Spanish conquest of Oran (1732); War of the Austrian Succession; Toulon

Admiral Juan José Navarro y Búfalo, 1st Marquess of Victoria, OSJ (30 November 1687 – 5 February 1772) was a Spanish military officer who served as the first captain general of the Navy from 1750 to 1772. A leading proponent of naval reform, he provided much of the practical curriculum for the Academia de Guardias Marinas, established in 1717 to provide professional training for Spanish Navy officers.

== Personal details ==
Juan José Navarro y Búfalo was born in Messina on 30 November 1687, eldest son of Ignacio de Navarro y Viana (died c. 1708), a captain in the army of the Spanish-ruled Kingdom of Naples, and Livia Búfalo, a Sicilian noblewoman. He had at least one younger brother, Ramón, who was killed in North Africa in 1708.

In 1711, he married María Josefa Gauset, a native of Lleida; they had two daughters, Ignacia and Rosalía, who married another Spanish admiral, Gutierre de Hevia, and inherited her father's title.

== Career ==
Navarro was commissioned into his father's company and when the War of the Spanish Succession began in 1701, his regiment served in Northern Italy where it formed part of the Franco-Spanish Bourbon army and was present at Luzzara and the Siege of Turin. When Spanish forces were withdrawn from Italy following the 1707 Convention of Milan, he took part in an expedition to relieve Spanish Oran in modern Algeria, where his brother Ramón was killed and his father died in captivity. Navarro himself returned to Spain and fought at Almenar in July 1710 and Zaragoza in August, where he was one of 7,000 Spanish prisoners.

After the Peace of Utrecht in 1714, he became captain of his late father's company, and participated in the pacification of Catalonia. He then joined the Spanish Navy and with the help of José Patiño, in 1717 was appointed as an instructor at the newly established Academia de Guardias Marinas based in Cádiz. When the War of the Quadruple Alliance began in 1718, he was part of the naval force that supported the invasion of Sicily and was present at the Battle of Cape Passaro in August, a comprehensive defeat by the Royal Navy that sparked a life-long interest in naval reform and tactics.

In 1732, he participated in the recapture of Oran under the Duke of Montemar and played an important role in covering the landing by the use of his naval guns. As a result of his academic work, in 1740 he was admitted to the Real Academia Española.

During the War of the Austrian Succession in 1742, his squadron was taking supplies to the Spanish army in Italy when the British Mediterranean Fleet forced him to take refuge in the French naval base at Toulon. He remained there until February 1744, when he was ordered to combine with the French Levant Fleet, break the blockade and escape into the Atlantic. The Franco-Spanish force beat off a poorly co-ordinated British attack in the Battle of Toulon (1744) and in recognition of this, Navarro was promoted to lieutenant general, or Teniente Géneral. However, Navarro claimed he had been insufficiently supported by his allies, and Philip V of Spain made him Marqués de la Victoria, or Marquis of Victory, a title which underlined the Spanish belief that the battle was a success negated by the poor performance of the French.

After the battle his fleet remained blockaded in Cartagena, by a fleet of 21 ships under Rear-Admiral William Rowley and on 15 March 1750, he was appointed first Captain general of the Navy. Six years later he finished his Diccionario demostrativo de la configuración y anatomía de toda arquitectura naval moderna.

In 1759, he commanded the convoy of 36 ships that brought Charles III, the new King of Spain, from Naples to Spain. His flagship was the El Fénix (80 guns) with his son-in-law Gutierre de Hevia as captain. His last assignment in 1768 was leading a squadron of nine ships which escorted Infanta María Louisa to her husband Leopold II, Holy Roman Emperor, and brought back Maria Luisa of Parma, who was to marry Charles IV of Spain. On 5 February 1772, Navarro died in Cádiz of Gangrene at the age of 84.

== Sources ==
- Anderson, M.S (1995). The War of the Austrian Succession 1740-1748. Longman. ISBN 978-0582059511.
- Aranda, Marcelo (2020). "The Jesuit Roots of Spanish Naval Education: Juan José Navarro's Translation of Paul Hoste for the Academia de Guardias Marinas". Journal of Jesuit Studies. 7 (2): 185–203. doi:10.1163/22141332-00702003. S2CID 213317091.
- Cust, Sir Edward (1858). Annals of the wars of the eighteenth century: compiled from the most authentic histories of the period, Volume 1. Mitchell's Military Library.
- Ponce, José Vargas (1808). Vida de Don Juan Josef Navarro, primer Marqués de la Victoria (in Spanish). Imprenta Real.
