= Battle of Djebel Amour =

1679 battle

- Part of Conflicts between the Regency of Algiers and Morocco
Date	1679
Location	Djebel Amour
Result	Algerian victory

Belligerents
Regency of Algiers	(Morocco) Alawi Sultanate

Commanders and leaders
(Regency of Algiers) Hadj Ahmed Chabane	Ismail Ibn Sharif

Strength
Unknown	Unknown, but large

Casualties and losses
Unknown	Unknown

The Battle of Djebel Amour occurred in 1679 when Moulay Ismail of Morocco led an unsuccessful campaign in the area of Djebel Amour. His forces were no match for the Algerians and he was defeated at the Chelif river, near its source after his camp was attacked and bombarded with artillery which caused his men to panic and flee.

== Background ==
Moulay Ismail organised a large expedition, gathering a considerable amount of regular troops, infantrymen and horsemen provided by the Arab tribes of Morocco. He advanced towards the upper regions of the Moulouya and gathered contingents from various tribes, reinforcing his army and progressed along the Saharan roads towards Djebel Amour.

== Battle ==
A column, either from Mascara or Algiers, had followed his movements and positioned themselves at the right bank of the Moulouya river. These movements were intended to block his passage at a place called Gouïaa. The Moroccans were preparing for battle, making preparations to cross the Chelif, however they were defeated at the Chelif river when at night a grand battle took place and the Algerians bombarded the Moroccan camp with artillery. This attack caused terror and panic in the Moroccan camp, putting the Arab auxiliaries to flight and driving them out of the area.

== Aftermath ==
Following the bombardment, Moulay Ismail made peace with the Algerians and renewed the treaty that had been agreed with Moulay Rashid with the respective boundaries at the Tafna river. It is likely that Moulay Ismail considered himself lucky to get off lightly. As the failure of the expedition was mainly caused by the defection of the Arabs, Moulay Ismail swore to never rely on them again and to make them pay for their treachery.
