= Battle of Tlemcen (1696) =

Algerian battle fought in 1696

- Part of Conflicts between the Regency of Algiers and Morocco
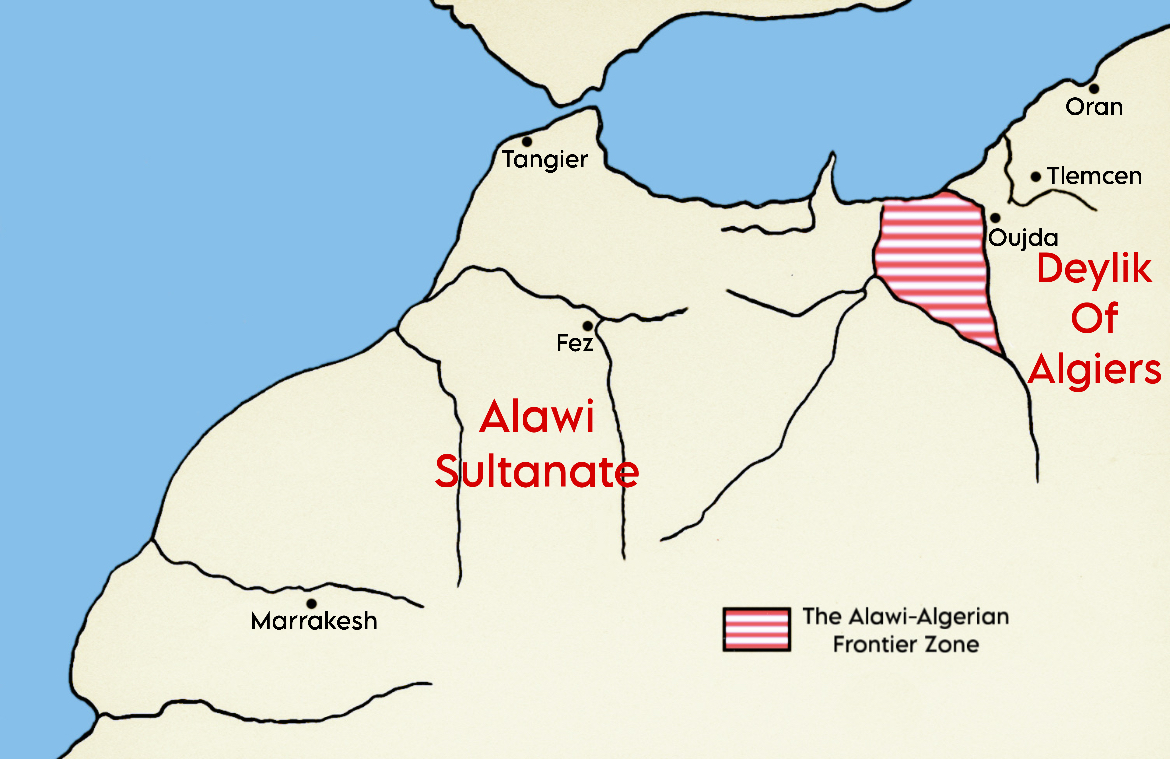
- The Alawi-Algerian frontier
Date	1696
Location	Tlemcen
Result	Algerian victory (Note: There were continuous Moroccan attacks on Algiers in 1693, 1694, 1696, 1700, 1701, 1703, and 1707. All of these assaults ended with a Moroccan defeat.) (Note: Quote from Estailleur-Chanteraine's 1931 book - Abd el Kader et le fils aîné du chérif qui commandait 30.000 hommes environ, dut prendre la fuite en abandonnant ses vivres, ainsi que 150 noirs qui furent capturés par les Algériens. C'est à ce moment que commença à circuler le bruit que le bey de Tlemcen de reprendre l'avantage et d'atteindre la région de Mostaganem. Mais là, il se heurta à l'infanterie de Tlemcen d'une part, et à la cavalerie d'Alger de l'autre; cette fois il fut battu et même grièvement blessé. (English translation - And the eldest son of the sharif, who commanded about 30,000 men, had to flee, abandoning his provisions, as well as 150 Black men who were captured by the Algerians. It was at this moment that rumors began to circulate that the Bey of Tlemcen was going to regain the upper hand and reach the region of Mostaganem. But there, he clashed with the infantry of Tlemcen on the one hand, and the cavalry of Algiers on the other; this time, he was defeated and even seriously wounded.))

Belligerents
Alawi Sultanate	Regency of Algiers

Commanders and leaders
Moulay Mohammed al-Alim (WIA)	Dey El Haj Ahmed

Strength
4,000 abid; 30,000 men	405 tents

Casualties and losses
Unknown casualties; 150 captives	Unknown

The Battle of Tlemcen took place in 1696 when a Moroccan expeditionary force conducted a raid in Algerian territory. The Algerians emerged victorious, seriously wounding the Alawi prince.

== Background ==
Previous attempts to invade Algerian territory, such as the Battle of Djebel Amour and the Battle of Moulouya, ended in victories for the Algerian forces. A further defeat was inflicted against the Moroccans in 1694, Moulay Ismail also had a tribute imposed on him by the Dey of Algiers.

In the summer of 1695, an Algerian embassy in Meknes protested the incursions that had occurred over the previous years. A move was made by the Alawites in November when the Alawite prince was dispatched at the head of an expeditionary force composed of 4,000 abid.

== The Battle ==
On February 6, the Dey decided to launch a campaign against the Moroccans. His forces consisted of 300 tents and another 105 tents stationed in Tlemcen. The preparations for the campaign were in place when on February 12 the Moroccan forces plundered the Tlemcen region. The Moroccan expeditionary force was conducting a tax raid and the rearguard of this force was ambushed by the Algerians, the Moroccans were heavily defeated.

Another conflict broke out when in July or the beginning of August the eldest son of Moulay Ismail with a force composed of 30,000 men had to take flight and abandon his provisions as well as 150 abid who were captured by the Algerians. It was at this time that rumours began circulating about how the Bey of Tlemcen was regaining the advantage after approaching Mostaganem. It was there that the Alawi prince clashed with the infantry of Tlemcen on one side and the cavalry of Algiers on the other. The Moroccan prince was defeated and seriously wounded.

Moulay Ismail made peace with the Algerians in 1696. Despite the peace agreement, further expeditions followed, resulting in a Moroccan-Tunisian alliance against the Algerians in the Maghrebi war. Moulay Ismail repeatedly sent letters to the Ottoman sultan, urging him not to protect the Algerians and describing their activities as greedy pursuits. However, by this era, Ottoman-Moroccan hostility had ceased, but tension with the Algerians continued. The Porte was unlikely to take any action to prevent the Algerians from acting, given the lack of control it exercised in Algiers.

== Sources ==
- Bennison, Amira K. (2003). Jihad and its Interpretation in Pre-Colonial Morocco: State-Society Relations during the French Conquest of Algeria (PDF). Routledge.
- Bernard, Augustin (1911). Les confins algéro-marocains. France: É. Larose. p. 124.
- Bernard, Augustin (1916). Le Maroc. France: F. Alcan.
- Cigar, Norman (2024). "A Letter from Mūlāy Ismāʿīl to Sultan Aḥmed III: An Episode in Moroccan-Algerian-Ottoman Relations" (PDF). Hespéris-Tamuda. 59 (1). "In a subsequent campaign in 1695-96, a Moroccan expeditionary force commanded by Mulãy Ismaʿil's son Ahmad was soundly defeated by the Algerians."
- Estailleur-Chanteraine, Philippe d' (1931). Abd el Kader. France: Librairie de France. "Moulay Ismail battu deux fois par les Algériens en 1694 et 1700."
- Galibert, Léon (1854). L'Algérie, ancienne et moderne depuis les premiers établissements des Carthaginois jusqu'à l'expedition du général Randon en 1853. France: Furne. p. 235.
- Kurrāsāt al-Tūnisīyah (in French). Institut des hautes études. 1981.
- Mercer, P. A. (1974). Political and military developments within Morocco during the early Alawi Period (1659-1727) (PhD thesis). SOAS University of London. doi:10.25501/SOAS.00029688.
- Palotas, Zsolt (2023). "Borders and Identity in Early Modern Maghreb: Boundary Changes of Algeria and Tunisia, 1529–1881". Études sur la Région Méditerranéenne.
