= Mohammed el Kebir =

18th-century Maghrebi military leader

Bey Mohammed ben Othman
- محمد بن عثمان الكبير

Bey of the Western Beylik of Algeria
- In office 1779–1796
- Appointed by: Muhammad V ben Othman
- Preceded by: Hadj Khrellil Bey
- Succeeded by: Othman ben Mohammed Bey

Personal details
- Born: Mohammed ben Othman; Approx between 1734 and 1739 Somewhere in the Beylik of Titteri
- Died: 1796 Oran
- Citizenship: Deylik of Algiers
- Children: Othman ben Mohammed Bey
- Parent: Othman al-Kurdi (father)
- Occupation: Bey (governor); Military commander
- Nickname(s): "Mohammed Bey al-Kebir" (Mohammed Bey the great)

Military service
- Allegiance: Deylik of Algiers
- Years of service: 1768–1796
- Battles/wars: Invasion of Algiers (1775); Siege of Oran (1790–1792); Capture of the Rif (1792); Spanish–Algerian War (1775–1785)

Mohammed ben Othman, also known as Mohammed el Kebir, was the bey of the Western Beylik from 1776 to 1796. He is best-known for re-conquering Oran and Mers El Kébir from the Spaniards. He was known as a reformist.

== Biography ==
He was the son of a bey of Titteri called Othman al-Kurdi. His date of birth is unknown, although it is known that the Khaznadar (treasurer) of the dey estimated that he was between 40 and 45 years old when he met him in 1779. Mohammed was appointed caïd of Flitta, an important position in the western beylik. He was appointed by Baba Mohammed Ben-Osman. He was appointed as khalifa (supreme military commander) of the Western Beylik in 1768, and in 1775 during the reign of Ibrahim of Miliana he valiantly led more than 4,000 fighters from the Western Beylik during the Spanish Invasion of Algiers in 1775. He played no small part of the battle and is said to have led a brilliant cavalry charge against the Spanish troops camped around El Harrach. In 1776 Ibrahim of Miliana died, and despite his wild popularity and great honor, Mohammed was discarded in favor of a very rich and influential man called "Hadj Khrellil".

Hadj Khrellil died in 1779, after which Mohammed became bey of Mascara. Possessing good revenues, he decided to invest in the economy and the well-being of his people. He stomped out the famine which had started under Hadj Khrellil and opened soup kitchens in the palace of Mascara to alleviate starvation. He also invested in education of the region, building a new madrasa and library in Mascara, and renovating several old and crumbling schools in Tlemcen and Mostaganem. He also wished to increase control over the Sahara, and led several expeditions to pacify and subjugate autonomous cities and oases in the northern Sahara. He was a greatly respected leader and the bey of Tunis and the Sultan of Morocco regularly exchanged gifts with him. During his reign a small gold mine was discovered, further boosting his income. His best known achievement was recapturing Oran from the Spaniards in 1792, of which several qasidas were written. He moved his capital to Oran, and died in 1796. His reign was one of the last positive ones for Oran, and after his death, the beylik of the West began to decline thanks to corruption and inaction, which persisted until the last bey of Oran, Hassan Bey, capitulated to the French in 1831.
