= Oran expedition (1707) =

Oran Expedition (1707)
- Part of Conflicts between the Regency of Algiers and Morocco
Date	1707
Location	Moulay Ismail forest, 35 kilometres east of Oran
Result	Algerian victory: Moroccan army almost entirely destroyed

Belligerents
Regency of Algiers: Beylik of Mascara	Sultanate of Morocco

Commanders and leaders
Bouchelaghem Bey	Ismail ibn Sharif

Strength
4000	30000

Casualties and losses
Unknown	Heavy losses: The army is almost entirely destroyed

The Oran Expedition in 1707 was a military operation led by Moulay Ismail ibn Sharif in which he attempted to extend Moroccan rule into western Algeria. The battle ended in a Moroccan defeat, and the site of the battle was named after the defeated Moroccan king, Moulay Ismail.

== Background ==
Oran which was then under Spanish rule was plagued by the attempts of Morocco and Algiers. Despite his previous unsuccessful siege in 1693, Moulay Ismail made another attempt to extend Moroccan domination to Oran in 1707. The Moroccan king raided the areas near Oran, with the objective of eventually taking control of the city.

== Battle ==
The attack took place in a forest not far from a small village called La Mare d'Eau. 35 km east of Oran.

Moulay Ismail and his army encountered the Bey of Mascara Mustapha Bouchelaghem who then severely defeated Moulay Ismail. Moulay Ismail's army was almost entirely destroyed.

== Consequences ==
It is said that the night of his defeat, while fleeing the battle, followed only by a few of his officers Ismail turned to them and said :«Oran is comparable to a viper sheltered under rock, misery to the unwise who touch it !».

Right after the unsuccessful Moroccan invasion Mustapha Bouchelaghem captured Oran from the Spaniards.
