= Francisco Javier Cornejo =

Spanish military commander

Don Francisco Javier Cornejo López-Cotilla (March 4, 1669 in Ruesga, Cantabria – March 27, 1750 in Madrid), also known as Don Francisco Javier Cornejo Vallejo, was a Spanish military commander of the Spanish navy. He participated in the successful Spanish expedition to Oran (1732).
