= Siege of Oran (1693) =

1693 siege

Coordinates: 35°41′49″N 0°37′59″W

- Part of Conflicts between the Regency of Algiers and Morocco
Date	20 July–24 July 1693
Location	Oran, Spanish Oran
Result	Algerian-Spanish victory

Belligerents
Spanish Empire; Regency of Algiers	Sultanate of Morocco

Commanders and leaders
Andrés Copola	Ismail Ibn Sharif; Zidan Ibn Ismail

Strength
Unknown	20,000 men
- Location of the Siege of Oran in Algeria.

The siege of Oran (1693) was an attempt by the Alaouite sultan Ismail Ibn Sharif to take the city of Oran, which was then under Spanish rule. After being defeated by the Spanish, he was attacked and defeated again by the Algerian Arab tribes while retreating from the territory.

== Background ==
The Sharif Ismail and his sons carried out various expeditions in Algerian territory between 1640 and 1701 with the support of certain marabouts. All of these expeditions failed.

The presence of the Spaniards in Oran allowed the Algerians to benefit from the status of fighters (ghazis) in the holy war against the Christian invaders. Thus the Moroccans decided to not include them in the campaign as to not give them any more prestige. Maraboutic expeditions were mounted to besiege Oran. It was in this context of rivalry that Ismail Ibn Sharif made an attempt in 1693 to capture Oran, and possible more territory. These repeated incursions by Moulay Ismael into western Algeria led to the only period when a Spanish-Algerian alliance existed.

== Battle ==
Moulay Ismail set off on a campaign with an army of more than 20,000 men. He launched several raids against the Beni Amer and the other Algerian tribes, as to push them back. Oran itself was commanded by the Andrés Copola, Duke of Canzano. Moulay Ismail attempted a swift attack on 20 July, followed by another attempt on 24 July, both of which failed in the face of heavy artillery fire from the square and the firm defence of the Spanish garrison. His army suffered a real disaster and he had to retreat. However, during this retreat he was attacked in reprisal by Algerian Arab tribes under whom he previously raided. They achieved a victory over him, and successfully recovered a large amount of loot which was taken from them.

== Aftermath ==
Moulay Ismael is said to have declared following his failed attempt:

Oran is like a viper sheltered under a rock: woe betide the imprudent person who touches it!

— Ismail Ibn Sharif, after his defeat

Following these events, the Sultan of Constantinople sent an embassy to invite Moulay Ismaïl to make peace with the Algerians and to respect their territory; the Sultan of Morocco accepted this invitation.

Oran was under Spanish hands until 1708, when Bey Bouchelaghem besieged and conquered the city from the Spanish.
