= Western Beylik =

Governorate (Beylik) in the Regency of Algiers

Beylik of the West بايلك الغرب (Arabic) bâylik al-gharb
- 1563–1831
- Map of the Regency of Algiers.
- Status: Governorate of the Regency of Algiers (1563–1830); Independent state (1830–1831)
- Capital: Mazouna (1563–1701); Mascara (1701–1708 & 1732–1792); Oran (1708–1732 & 1792–1831)
- Official languages: Arabic; Ottoman Turkish
- Common languages: Algerian Arabic; Berber
- Religion: Official: Maliki Sunni Islam; Minorities: Shia Islam; Judaism; Catholicism
- Government: 1563-1830; Beylik; Elective monarchy under the suzerainty of the Algerian Dey
- Bey
- Historical era: Early Modern Period
  - Established: 1563
  - Capture of Oran: 1831
Preceded by	Succeeded by
Kingdom of Tlemcen	Oran department; Emirate of Mascara
- Today part of: Algeria

The Beylik of the West (in Arabic: bâylik al-gharb) was one of three Beyliks (governorates) of the Regency of Algiers, with the other two being the Beylik of Titteri and the Beylik of Constantine. It was established in 1563, and it was ended during the French conquest.

== Geography ==
The Beylik of the West was the largest one out of the Beyliks of Algiers, it largely corresponded to Oranie. Its capital was Mazouna, then Mascara and the last one was Oran. The exact borders of the Beylik constantly fluctuated thanks to conflicts with Saharan tribes, and Morocco. Oran and Mers el-Kébir came under Spanish control starting from the 1505 siege and they held it until the year 1792, when it was recaptured by Mohammed el Kebir (with the exception of 1708 to 1732, when the cities were briefly recaptured).

Apart from Oran, which was held by the Spanish Empire for part of the period, Tlemcen was the most important city followed by Mostaganem and Mascara. Other important towns included Tiaret, Mazouna, Nedroma, Kalaa and Miliana.

== History ==
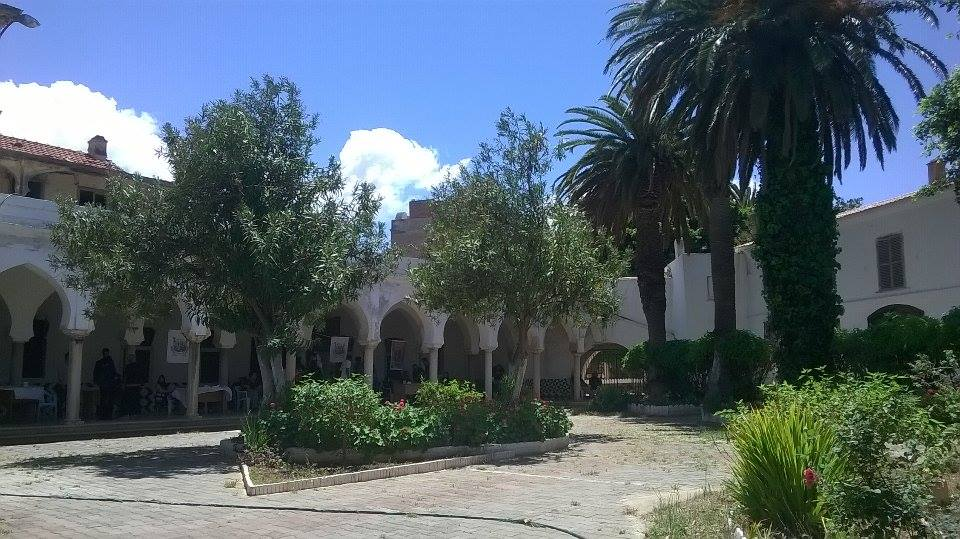
Bey's palace in Oran.

After returning from Mostaganem in 1563, after a failed campaign to reconquer Oran and Mers el-Kébir, Hassan Pacha decided to leave a local governorate capable of reinforcing the authority of Algiers, and to fight against the Spanish.

Hassan Pasha designated Bou Khedidja as governor of the province. He re-organized the region, appointing the caïds in the main towns and chose Mazouna in the interior of the country as his residence, he constituted a makhzen of allied tribes, by granting them privileges, and forcing the rebellious tribes to obey. His successor, Souag of Mazouna continued his work. He fought against an uprising led by the marabout Mohamed Ben Ali. The beys Sayah and Saad established their authority over the Berber tribes of Dahra.

Mazouna remained the capital of the Beylik until the end of the 17th century. In 1700, Mustapha Bouchlaghem, an Arabized Berber born in the vicinity of the city, transferred the capital to Mascara, because it was in a more central position. He contributed in the Algerian victory against the moroccan Alaouite Sultan Ismail bin Shariff attempts to takes territories and plunder villages in the battle of the Cheliff on 28 April 1701 with the help of several Algerians tribals warriors of the Oranian region and in 1707 he defeated the Sultan of Morocco Ismail bin Shariff in the west of Sig in a forest which were called forest of Moulay ismail after this battle in memory of this battle those battles contributed to re-establish the borders until the tafna rivers. He took Oran from the Spaniards in 1708, which then became his capital, but in 1732 the Spaniard retook the city and Bouchelaghem had to take refuge in Mostaganem. He ruled until 1734, when he died a natural death. In 1748, the Kouloughlis of Tlemcen revolted, albeit the revolt was crushed. In 1754, a new revolt started in the town led by caïd Radjem.

In 1779, Mohamed el Kebir was appointed as Bey of Oran. He reorganized the province and restored order. He recaptured Oran and Mers-el-kébir in 1792, which is the origin of the « el Kebir » part of his name (which also means the great) and in the same year the Rif in Morocco were conquered which will be given back to the Alaouites dynasty after an agreement between the Algerian Bey Muhammad al Kabir and the Moroccan Sultan Sulayman in 1798. Oran became for the second time the capital of the province and it was the territorial expansion and the apogee of the Western Beylik. After his death in 1799, his son Othman was designated as Bey. The province was met with new difficulties, mainly revolts instigated by marabouts and the religious brotherhoods of Tidjaniya and Derkawa.

After the Fall of Algiers, and the expulsion of dey Hussein, the forces of the three Beyliks of Constantine, Oran and Titteri did not regroup against the forces of the invader. French troops occupied Oran on 1 January 1831. The submission of Bey Hassan caused the population to flee the town. He was replaced by Bey Kheireddine who was sent from Tunis by the French administration but soon after he went back to Tunisia, forced due to the small population of Oran before due to multiples wars with Spain most the inhabitants fled in the tribes or others cities of south or others areas in the region or joined Emir Abdelkader who had a legitimacy and influence much stronger than the Tunisian statesman who probably saw no interests in staying in the difficult situation of French forces limited to the city of Oran and harassed by the resistance of tribes which resulted in the creation of a new Algerian state completely made by the local Algerian people centralized firstly in western Algeria in the city of Mascara and later Tagdemt close to Tiaret for later making a mobile head quarter and nomadic capital called the Smalah, the Emirate of Algeria succeeded the Regency of Algeria which included 2 others political entities integrated as viceroyalty governed by Beys the Beylik of the West and of Titteri annexed by Emir Abdelkader until Setif and Biskra, The eastern Beylik of Constantine were still existing this time independently from Algiers and the Ottoman Empire until France conquer its capital in 1837 but Ahmed Bey got refuge amongst the Chaouis tribes of the Aures mountains until 1848. The troubles made by French invasion will result in an Algerian reaction making severals principality and others way of resistances already making the structures of revolutionnaries ideas and independentists against the oppression of colonization which will be the main reasons of Algerian war of Independence which will make the modern Algeria we know.

== See also ==
- Regency of Algiers
- List of governors and rulers of the Regency of Algiers
