= Bey's Palace =

Coordinates: 35.7054899°N 0.6489236°W

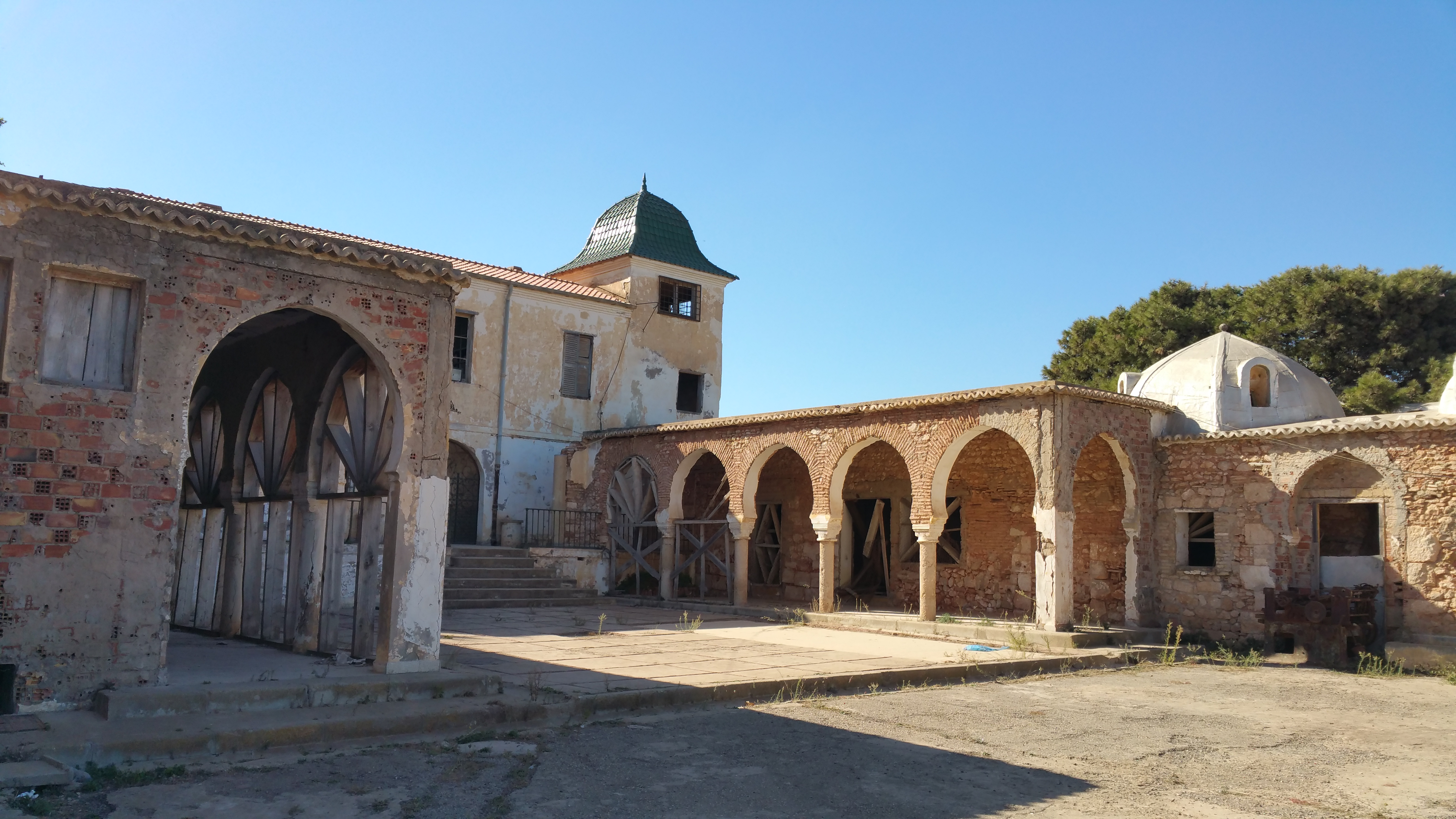
- Interactive map of the Bey's Palace area

General information
- Type: Palace
- Location: Oran, Algeria
- Construction started: early 18th century
- Owner: Algerian state

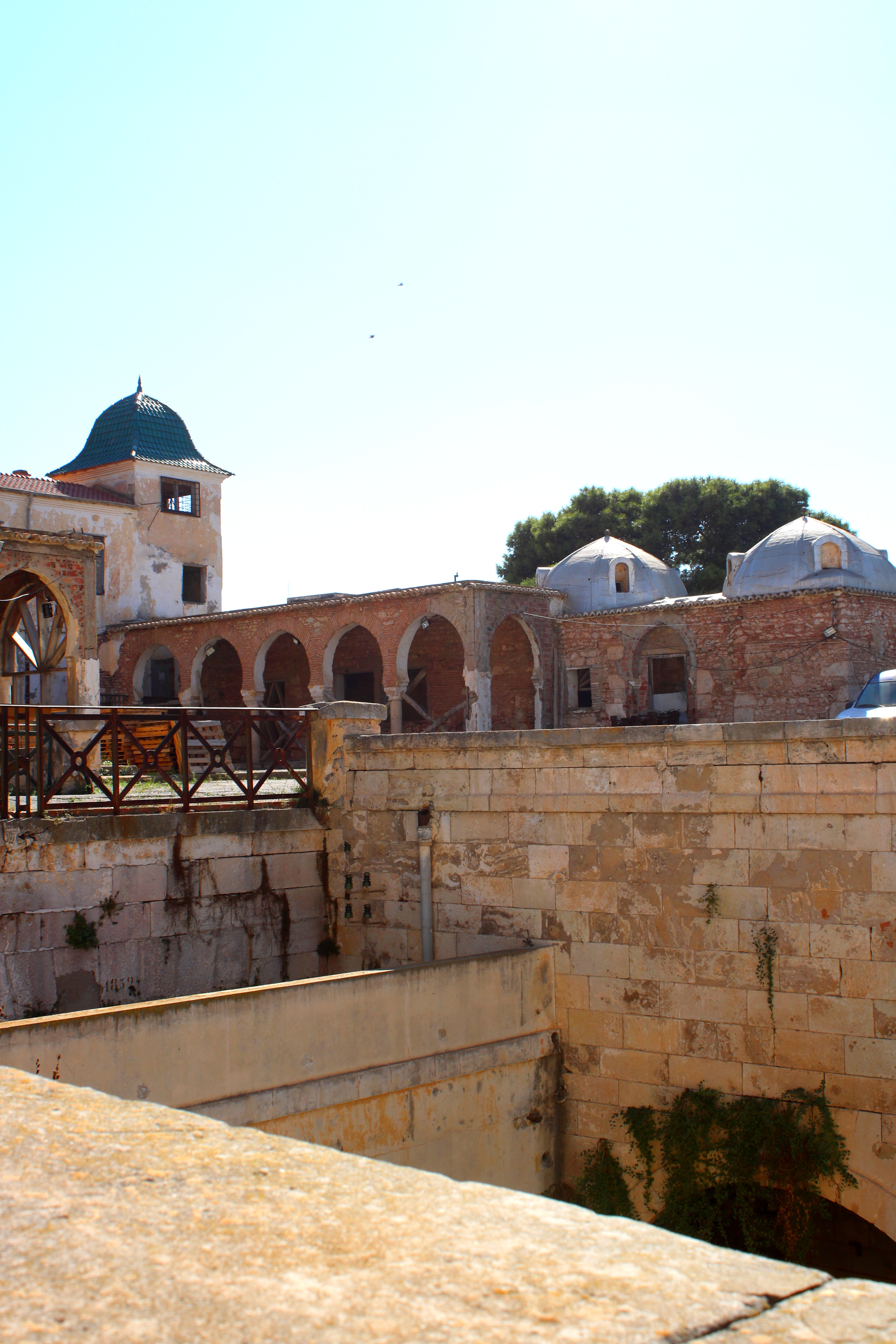
Bey's Palace

Bey's Palace (Arabic: قصر الباي) is a historic palace in Oran, Algeria dating back to the Ottoman era. It was a residence of the ruler who belonged to the Western Baylik. The palace is situated in Sidi al-Houari, near the mount Marjaju, and it is categorized as a national heritage. The palace was built in 18th century, commissioned by Muhammad Bey the Great. The palace has an area size of around 5.6 hectare. It consists of diwan (public room), suite, harem, two guard towers which date back to 1345 during the Marinid era, barracks (which were used as a horse stable as well by both Ottomans and French), courtyard, and several other adjacent facilities. Today it is a favorite spot for tourists both domestic and foreign.

== Gallery ==
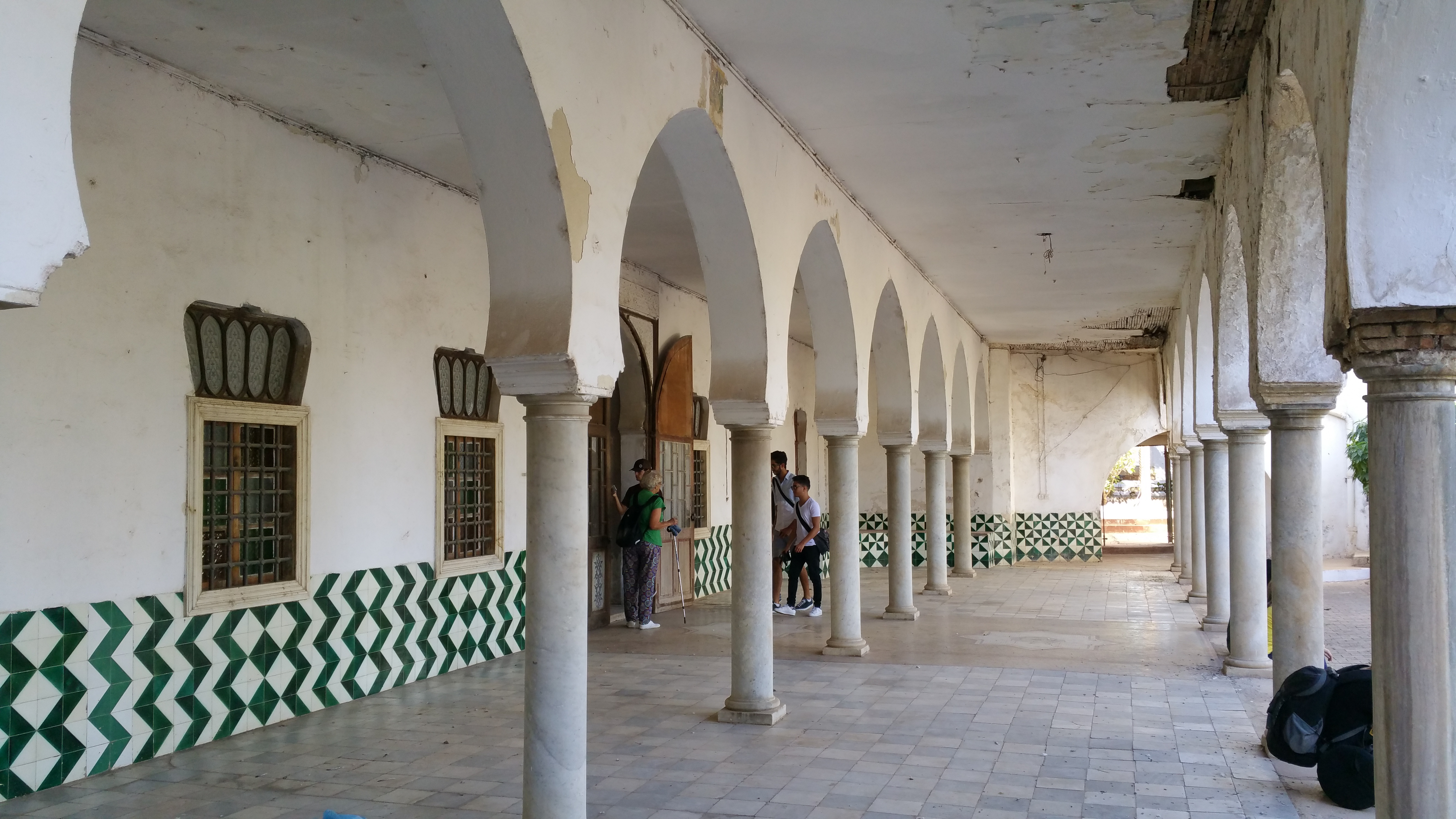
Alley

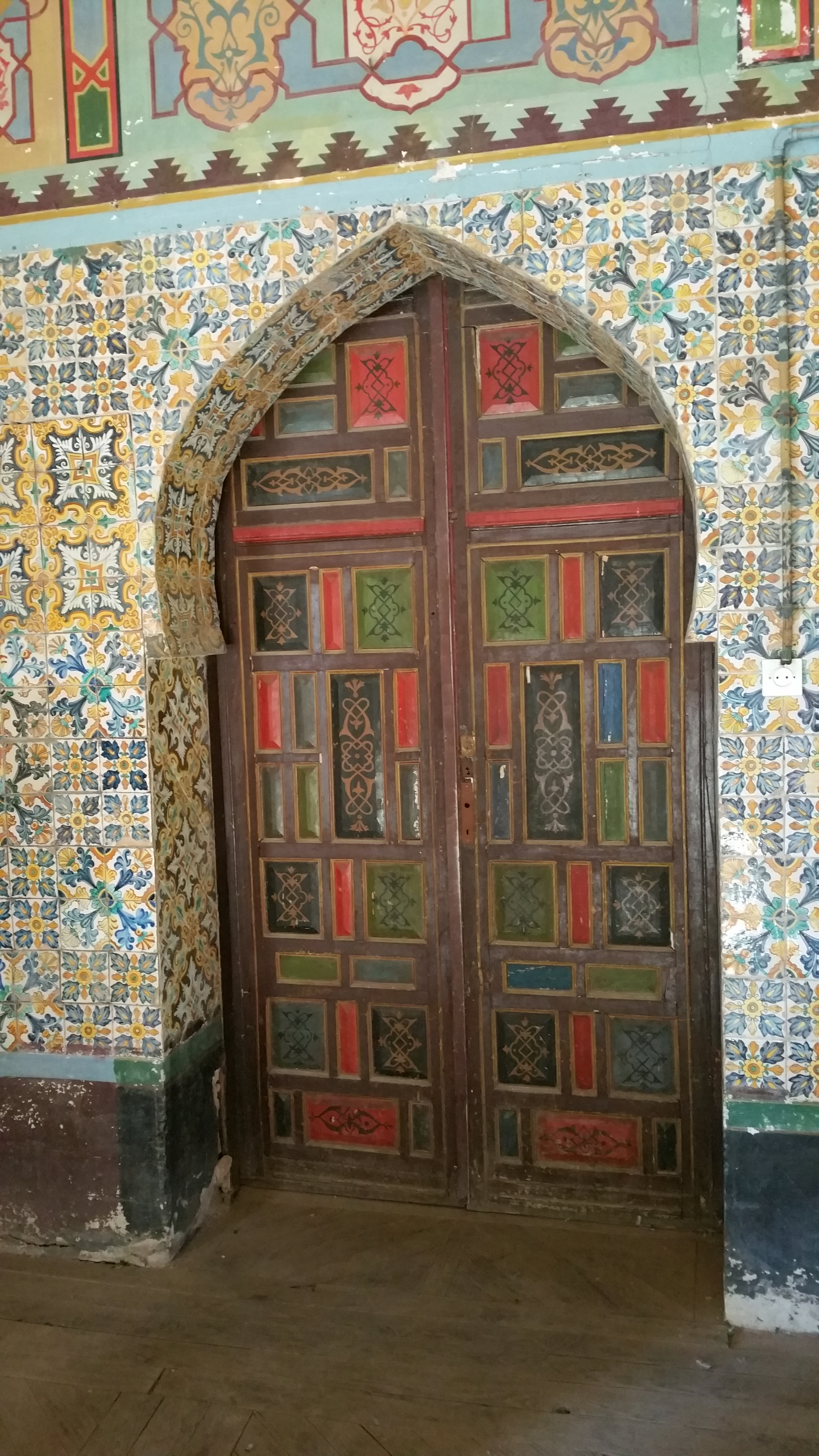
A door and stucco paintings

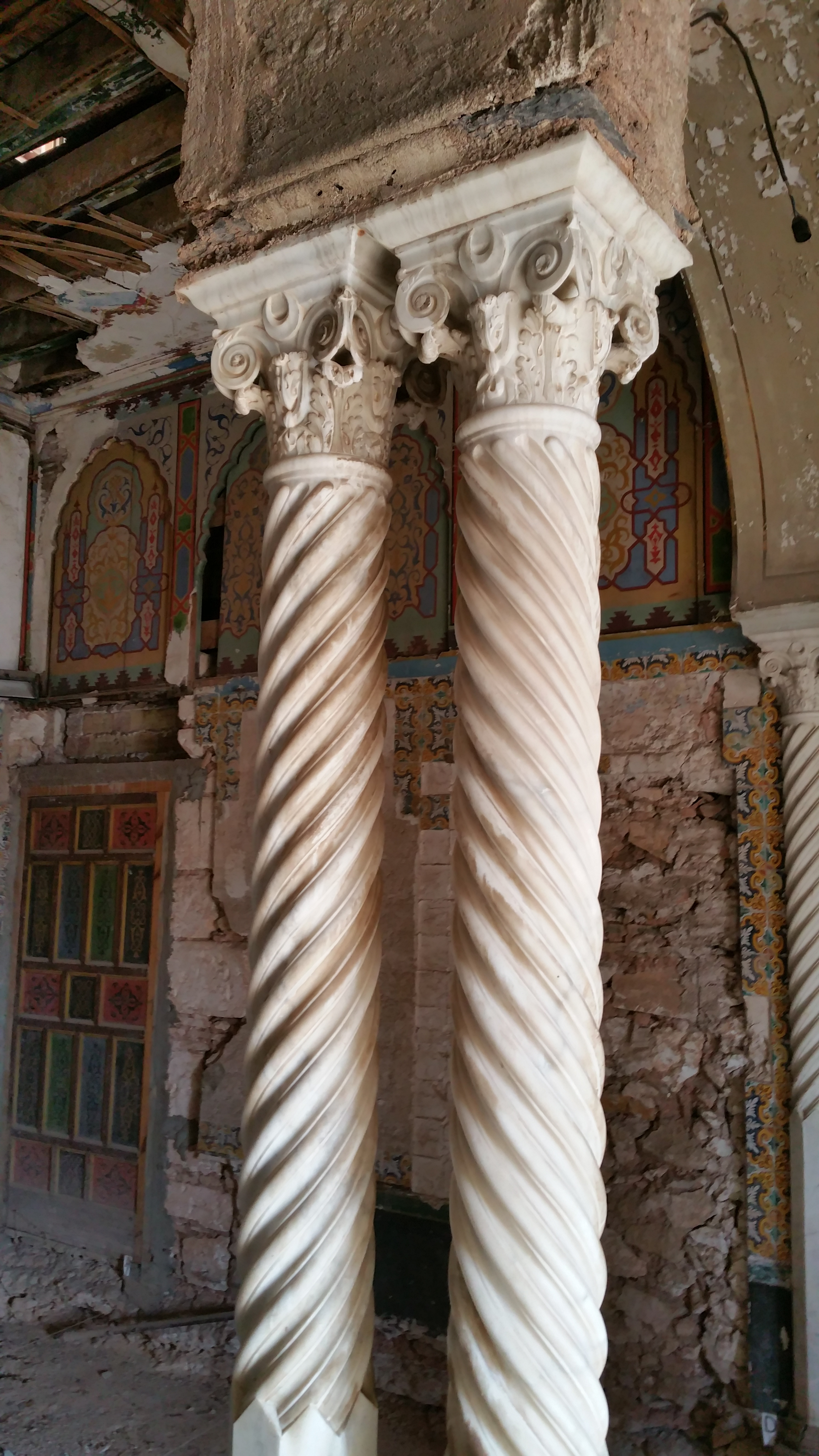
Pillars

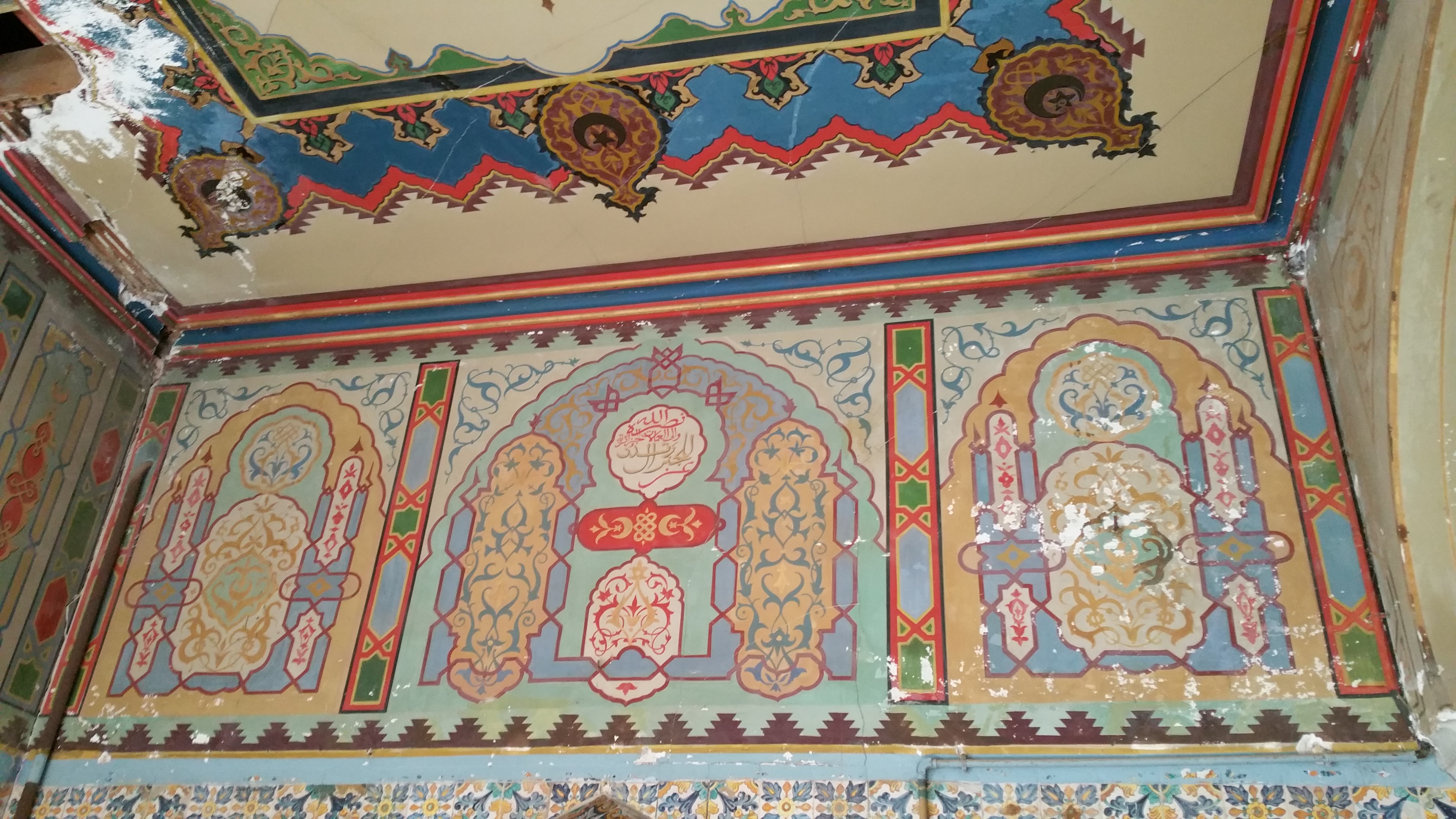
Stucco paintings
