= Siege of Oran (1790–1792) =

Algerian victory over Spain

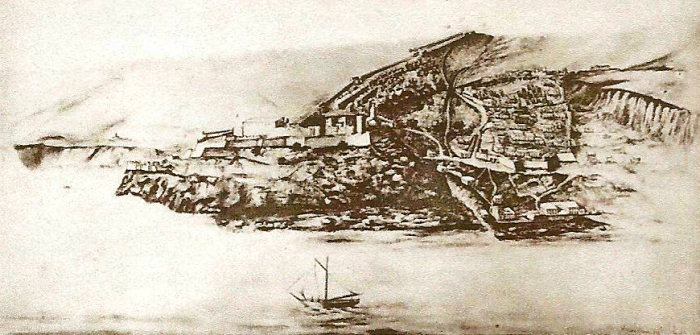
- Oran in 1750
Date	October 1790 – March 1792
Location	Oran, Mers el Kébir
Result	Algerian victory

Belligerents
Regency of Algiers	Spanish Empire

Commanders and leaders
Mohammed el Kebir	Juan de Courten

Strength
5,000 men	Unknown

Casualties and losses
Unknown	Heavy

The siege of Oran was a military campaign launched on the Spanish garrison of Oran by the Regency of Algiers led by Mohammed el Kebir. The Algerians occupied the city after a siege that lasted from 1790 to 1792, ending a Spanish occupation that had lasted for 300 years.

== Background ==
In 1785, the Spanish began negotiations with Algiers. They were willing to cede Oran and Mers el-Kebir if they would be allowed to retain their trading posts, in return for Algiers to stop attacking Spanish vessels. The Algerians were happy with these terms, but the Spanish population was outraged, and forced their government to delay carrying them out. The death of Charles III of Spain and the breakout of the French Revolution forced the Spanish to forget about Oran. The Dey of Algiers was becoming impatient with their false promises and began blockading Oran in 1789.

== Siege ==
In October 1790, Muhammad Bey began the siege of Oran with an army of 5,000 men. The Bey considered using mining explosives against the city walls; however, a violent earthquake struck Oran and devastated the town, destroying most of the city and killing more than 2,000. The Algerians used this opportunity to launch a swift assault on the city, but the Spanish garrison resisted fiercely and repelled the assault. The Algerians began besieging the city more closely. The Spanish began opening negotiations in August or September 1791. Both sides agreed to a treaty which confirmed the earlier terms. In early 1792, the Spanish evacuated the town along with their belongings, and in March, the Algerians occupied the city.

== Aftermath ==
The Algerians began repopulating the city with Arabs and Jews. It remained under their control for 40 years. The Ottoman sultan sent his praises when the city returned to Muslim control, ending the Spanish occupation of three hundred years.

== Sources ==
- Alan G. Jamieson (2013), Lords of the Sea, A History of the Barbary Corsairs.
- Noelle Watson, Paul Schellinger, & Trudy Ring (2014), Middle East and Africa, International Dictionary of Historic Places. Vol IV.
- Daniel Panzac (2005), Barbary Corsairs, The End of a Legend, 1800–1820.
