= Spanish conquest of Oran (1732) =

Military campaign in North Africa

Spanish expedition to Oran
- Part of the Spanish-Barbary wars
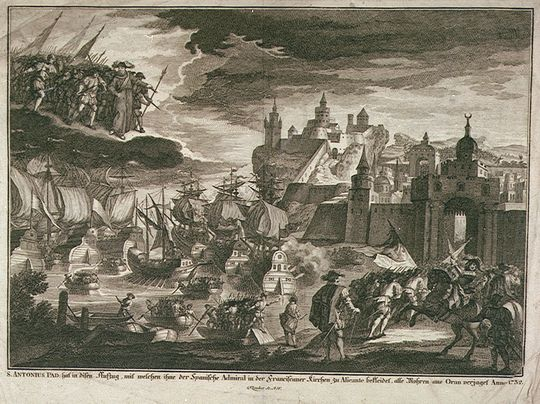
- Spanish attack on Oran of 1732
Date	15 June 1732 – 2 July 1732
Location	Oran, Mers el-Kebir, Regency of Algiers
Result	Spanish victory; Spanish reconquest of Oran; Spanish reconquest of Mers el-Kebir

Belligerents
Kingdom of Spain	Regency of Algiers; Beylik of Oran

Commanders and leaders
Philip V of Spain; Duke of Montemar; Francisco Cornejo; Blas de Lezo; Juan José Navarro	Bouchlaghem Bey; Wali Hassan; Ben Dabiza (surrendered); Mohamed Boutaleb

Strength
27,000–28,000 men 12 ships of the line 50 frigates 7 galleys 26 galiots 4 brigs 97 xebecs Several gunboats and bomb vessels 109 transport ships Unknown minor vessels	20,000 men Unknown number of ships

Casualties and losses
100 killed	Heavy human and naval losses 142 pieces of artillery captured

The Spanish conquest of Oran and Mers el-Kebir took place from 15 June to 2 July 1732, between the Kingdom of Spain and the Deylik of Algiers. The great Spanish expedition led by José Carrillo de Albornoz, Duke of Montemar and Francisco Javier Cornejo defeated the Algerian troops under the command of the Bey of the Beylik of Oran, Mustapha Bouchelaghem, and the Wali of Oran, Hassan. It successfully conquered the fortress-cities of Oran and Mers el-Kebir, ruled and administered by Algiers from 1708, during the War of the Spanish Succession, when both cities were conquered by the aforementioned Bouchelaghem, who was the governor of the western regions of Algiers.

== Background ==
During the War of the Spanish Succession, the strategic North African cities of Oran and Mers el-Kebir, which had been under Spanish control since the early 16th century, were taken by the Bey of Oran, Bouchlaghem Bey, taking advantage of the difficult time that Spain was going through. With the war having ended, and with the resurgence of the new Spain as one of the major European powers, the King Philip V of Spain, organised an expedition to recoup the lost cities. The expedition was, in part, funded by the successful offensive on the Republic of Genoa, led by Admiral Blas de Lezo, in which Lezo demanded a payment of two million pesos, and to pay homage to the Spanish flag, or else he would bombard the city. The Genovese finally accepted all the terms of the Spanish Admiral. Of the two million pesos, a million and a half was to be destined for the new expedition.

The rumour that Spain was preparing for another expedition, was cause for alarm for the Emperor Charles VI, thinking that Spain wanted to occupy the Italian territories held by the Austrians again. When all the preparations had been concluded, with the aim of calming the other European powers, Philip V published a decree which stated his intention of reconquering Oran.

== Preparations of the expedition ==
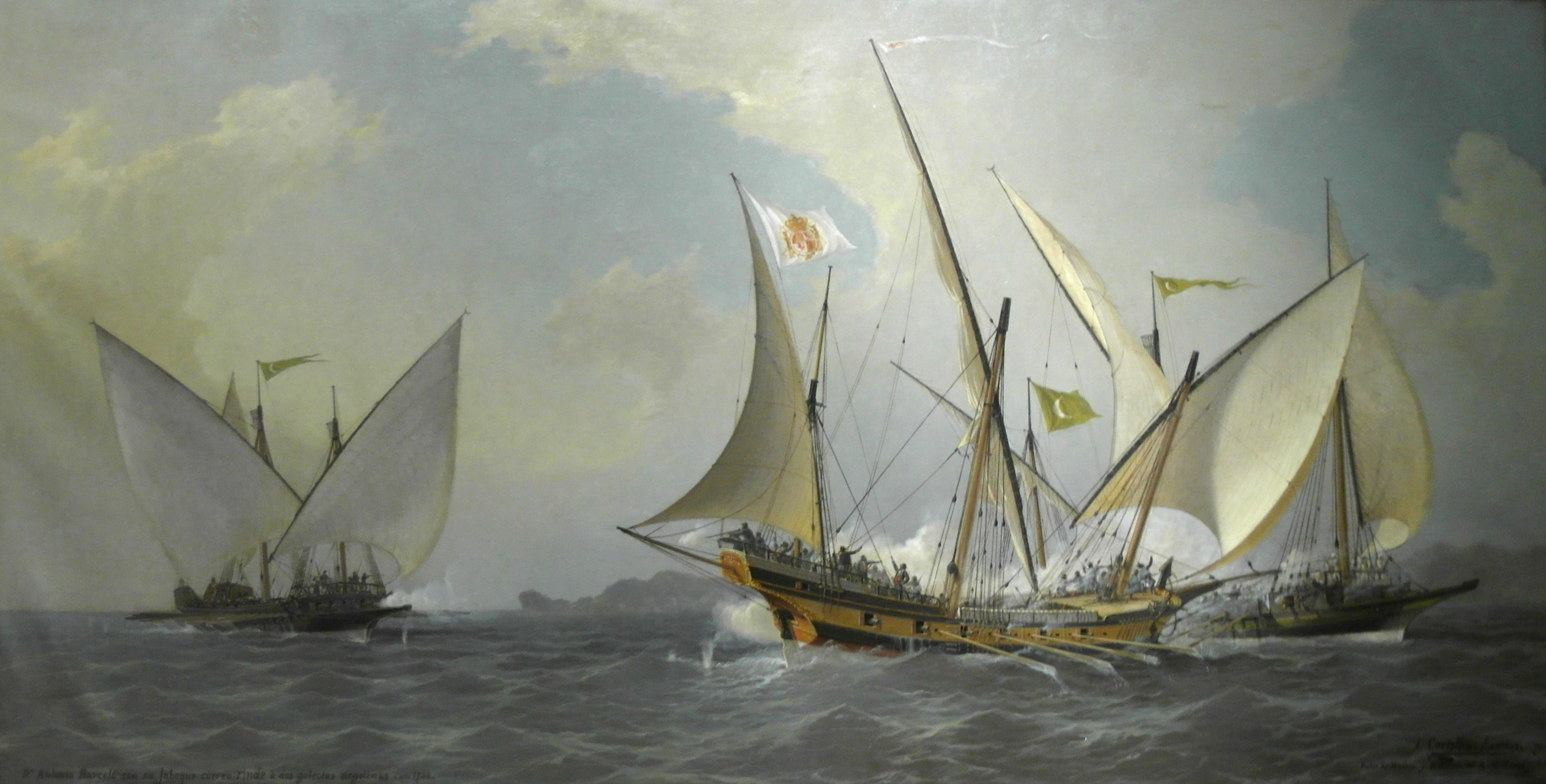
A Spanish xebec facing two Algerian corsair galiots

The expedition began to organise itself on 16 March 1732, in the port of Alicante. The person responsible for the preparation of the expedition was the Prince of Campo Florido, Captain-General and Governor of the Kingdom of Valencia. The city was overcome with the challenge of containing such a large number of troops, sailors and noblemen. The authorities estimated more than 30,000 present. At the time, the city received most of its merchandise via the port, with some help from nearby towns and cities, but finally the supply to the city was a success.

On 7 June, José Carrillo de Albornoz, Duke of Montemar, who Philip V had chosen as leader of the expedition, attended the Convent of Santísima Faz, to pray for protection and the success of his plan. The port began filling up with masts, and every type of sail conceivable, and by the end of May, Campo Florido informed the Spanish General, Alejandro de la Motte, that he had solved the embargo of all the transport ships nearby. Everything had been planned, down to the last detail, and the expedition was ready to set sail.

=== Fleet ===
The great fleet consisted of 12 ships of the line, 50 frigates, 7 galleys and 26 galiots, 4 brigs, 97 xebecs, several gunboats and bomb vessels, approximately 109 transport ships, and several minor ships and vessels of different classes, in total, the ships of the fleet numbered about 500–600, and the supreme commander of the fleet was the veteran naval officer Francisco Javier Cornejo. The fleet caused great astonishment in all Europe, and as a writer of that time, said:

Never before was the Mediterranean Sea covered in such a variety of flags.

=== Army ===
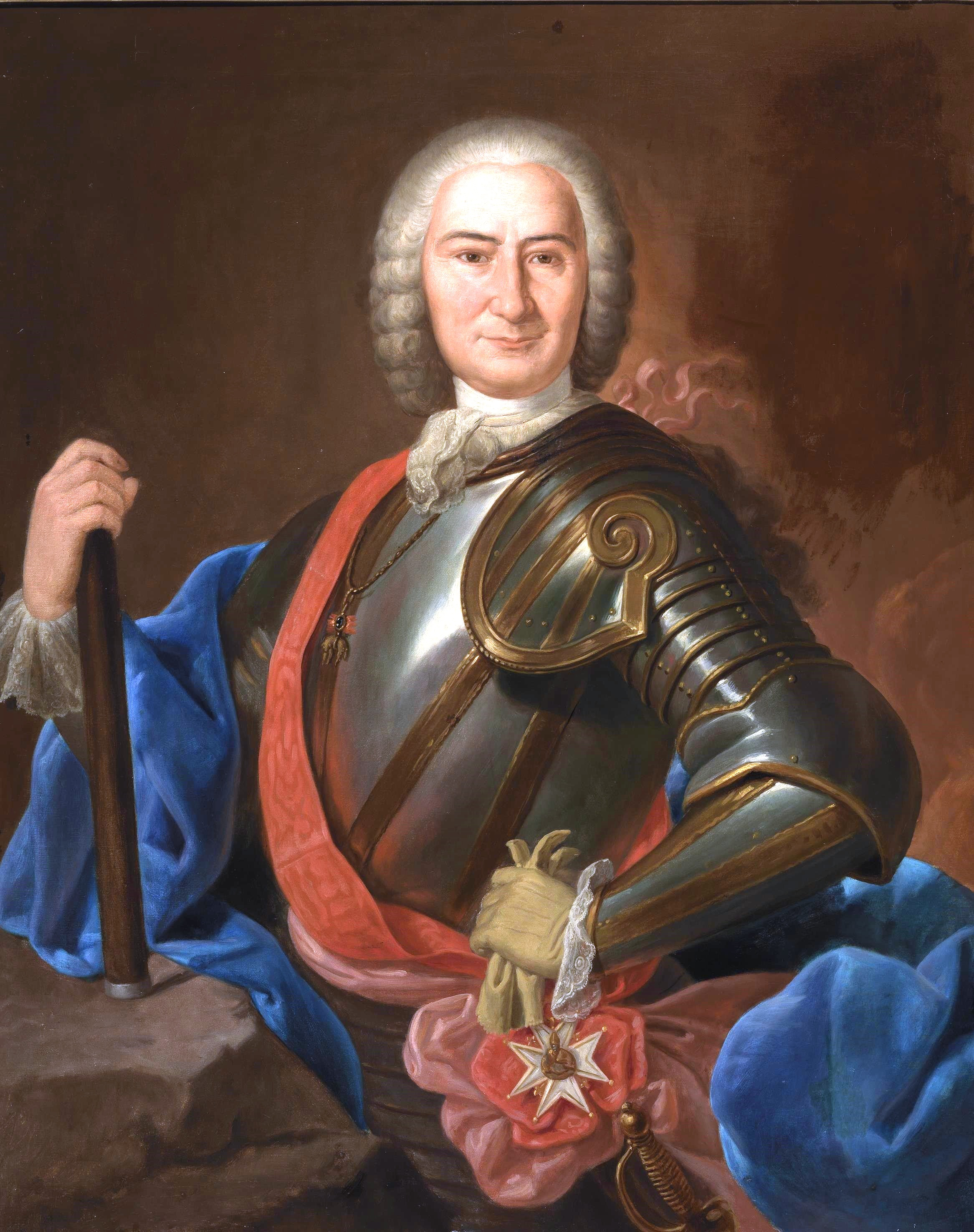
José Carrillo de Albornoz, Duke of Montemar, leader of the expedition

The army was led by the Duke of Montemar. The contingent consisted of 23 generals, 19 brigadiers and 129 officers.

The infantry consisted of 32 battalions; the artillery battalion (600 men and 60 pieces of artillery and 20 mortars), the regiments of Spanish and Walloon Guards (each with four battalions), the regiments of Spain, Soria, Vitoria, Cantabria and Asturias (each with two battalions), the regiments of Irlanda, Ultonia and Namur (each with one battalion), the regiments of Aragon, Hainaut, Antwerp and First and Third of Swiss (each with two battalions), and a company of riflemen and guides, all born in Oran, and administrative, legal and medical personnel. In total 23,100 men.

The cavalry was composed by the regiments Queen and Prince (each with 417 men) and Santiago and Granada (each with 419 men), and another four regiments of Spanish dragoons (each with three squadrons). In total 3,372 men.

== Expedition ==
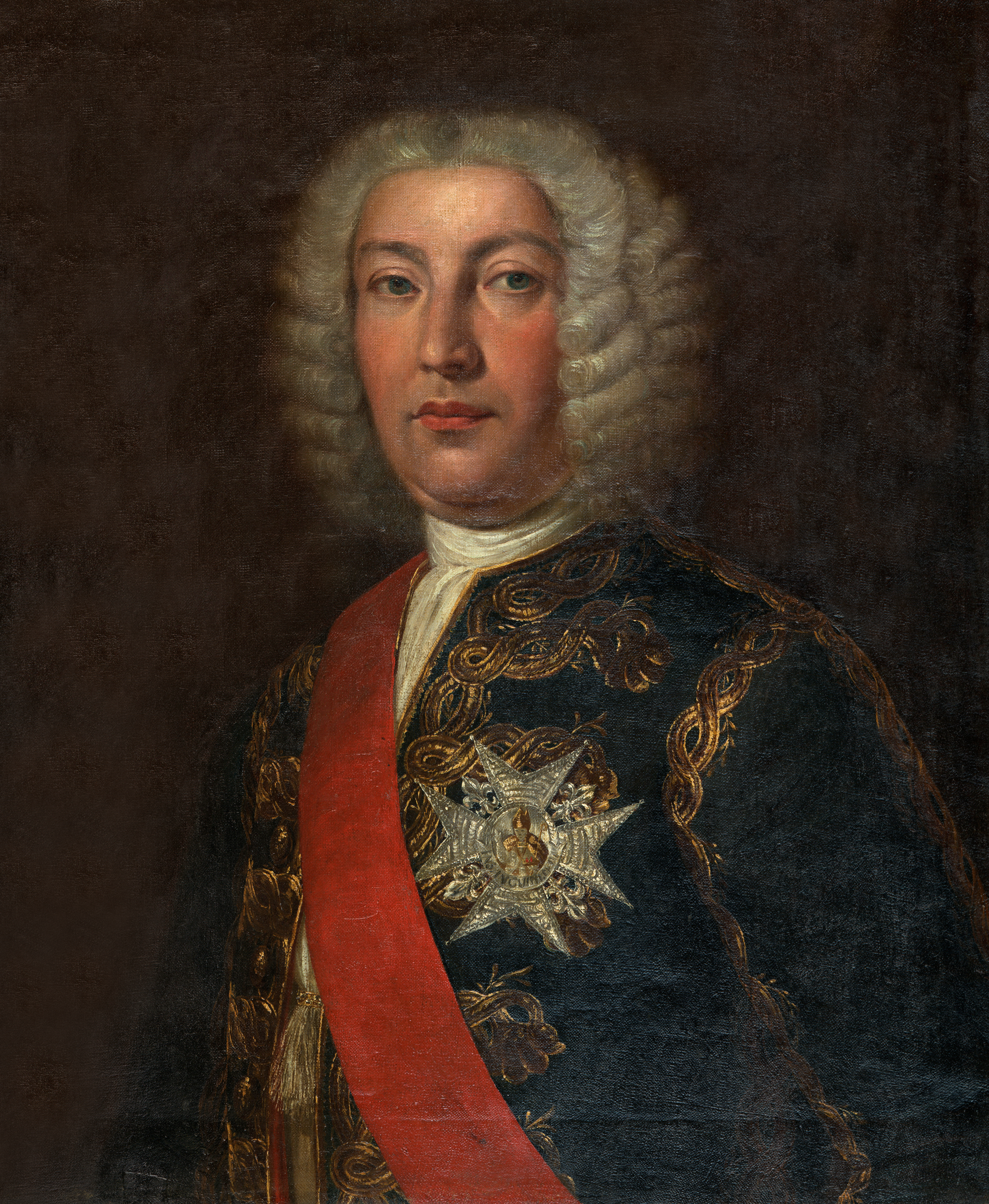
Spanish Admiral Juan José Navarro. Posthumous portrait by Rafael Tegeo.

On 15 June 1732, with all troops on board, and all preparations completed, the fleet was at anchor, and the next day the fleet began its departure in perfect formation, offering a wonderful spectacle. The Spanish soldier and poet, Eugenio Gerardo Lobo, who took part in the expedition, dedicated his poetry to the Spanish expedition:

Ve, lucido escuadrón, ve, fuerte armada,
Del monarca de España empeño augusto,
Y el pendón infeliz del moro adusto,
Su luna llore en ti siempre eclipsada.

A few days after, the fleet was obliged, due to contrary winds, to take cover near the Cape Palos, but on the 24 June, after overcoming its difficulties, it continued its journey towards Oran. On 27 June, the fleet arrived at the coasts of Oran, and the Duke of Montemar, ordered the troops to disembark on the Aguadas beach, near Mers el-Kebir, but this could not take place till the next day. At dawn, the troops began to disembarked with barely any resistance. The Algerian troops, who up to that time had remained in defensive positions, began to attack the Spanish troops; however, the firepower of the Spanish ships, in particular the ship of the line Castilla, under the command of Juan José Navarro, made a big contribution in covering the landing troops by the use of his naval guns, decimating and forcing the Muslim troops to flee. Before midday, all the infantry had disembarked, and the cavalry followed soon after.

== Conquest of Oran and Mers el-Kebir ==
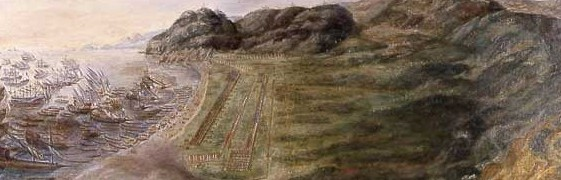
The Spanish landing

After midday, the grenadiers, together with the cavalry, gradually began to gather on a small hill, where the only fountain to be seen, around lay, and from where the Spanish troops had formed and taken control, and which the Moors wanted to take hold. The Duke of Montemar ordered a small fort to be built to ensure communication with the fleet. A company of fusiliers was set up to protect the workers on the Fort, but they were under continual attack from the large number of Algerian troops, and finally, due to lack of ammunition, they began to retreat. This retreat gave the Moors heart and they cautiosly advanced. Montemar, noticing this, sent 16 companies of infantry under the command of Alejandro de la Motte, and four squadrons of Spanish Dragoons to attack the front line of Muslim troops. The onslaught by the cavalry and infantry was so energetic that they caused many casualties in the enemy, and forced the Moorish troops to retreat to another distant mountain amid the great confusion. Counting Janissaries, Moors and Turks, they came to about 20,000 to 22,000 men in total.

De la Motte and his army continued to advance till they reached Mers el-Kebir, where they discovered a field in which the Janissaries had gathered. It was promptly destroyed, making about 300 Janissaries flee, all of whom belonged to Mers el-Kebir's garrison. Terrified by the intense firepower of the grenadiers, the captain of the fort of Mers el-Kebir (Ben Dabiza) capitulated, on the condition that they would be allowed to retreat to Algiers. Immediately after, De la Motte's army besieged Mers el-Kebir. Montemar, seeing how successful this had been, then sent his army to the nearby mountains where the majority of the enemy lay, but these, terrified and demoralised, retreated that same night to Oran, which was also abandoned along with all its forts and castles used for defence. The quality and discipline of the Spanish army, without a doubt terrified the Algerian troops. The next day, 1 July, Montemar, through a message from the French consul in Oran, found out about this news and immediately sent a detachment to confirm this. The news was in fact true, and the French consul himself, came out to receive the Spanish troops, who entered the city without any trouble, as it was almost deserted, as was the Palace of Bey. The Spanish captured 80 bronze pieces of artillery, 50 iron pieces and 12 bells, together with innumerable artifacts of war, and supplies, enough to supply the city for at least three months. The next day, 2 July, the city of Mers el-Kebir also capitulated to De la Motte's troops.

== Consequences ==
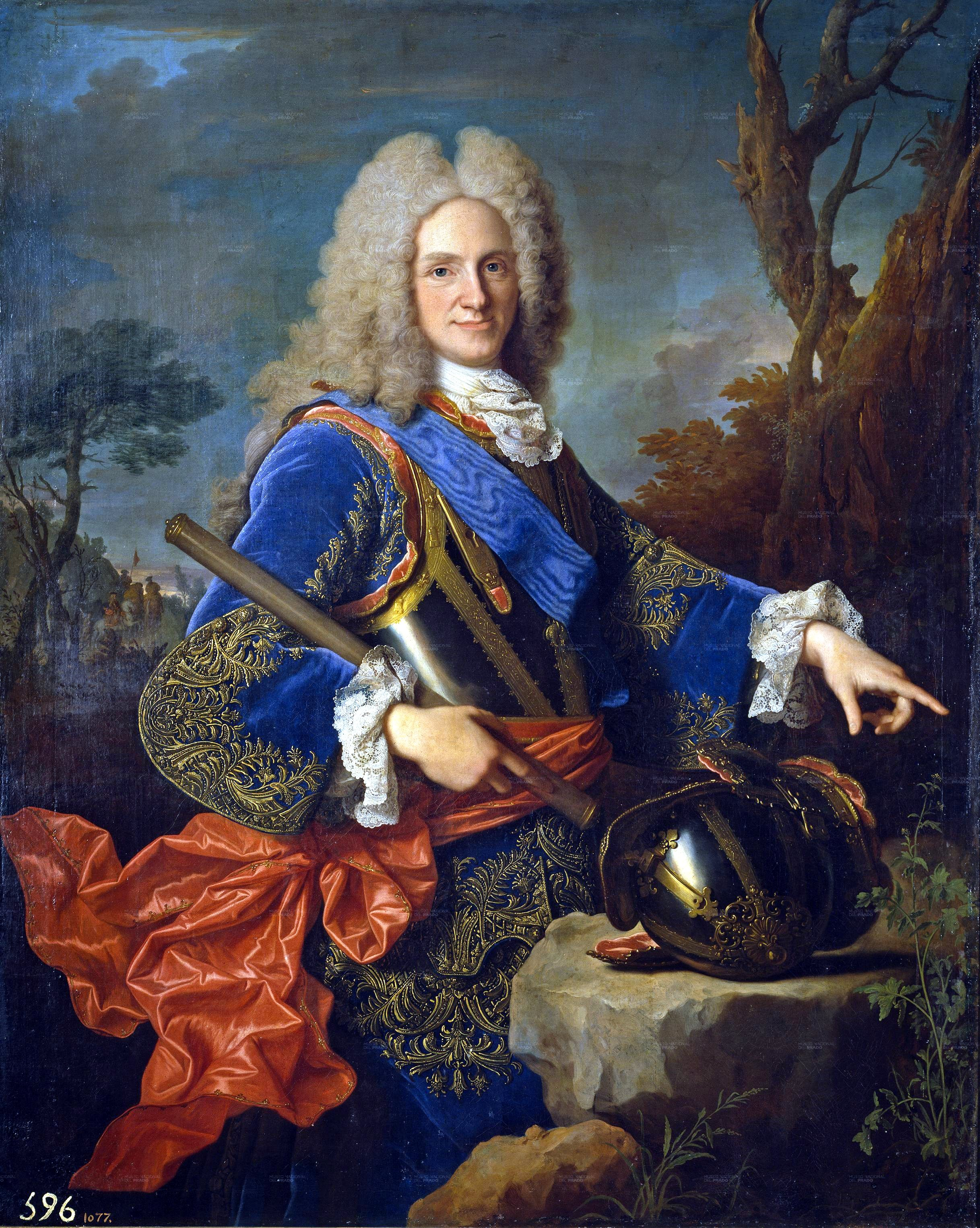
King Philip V of Spain by Jean Ranc

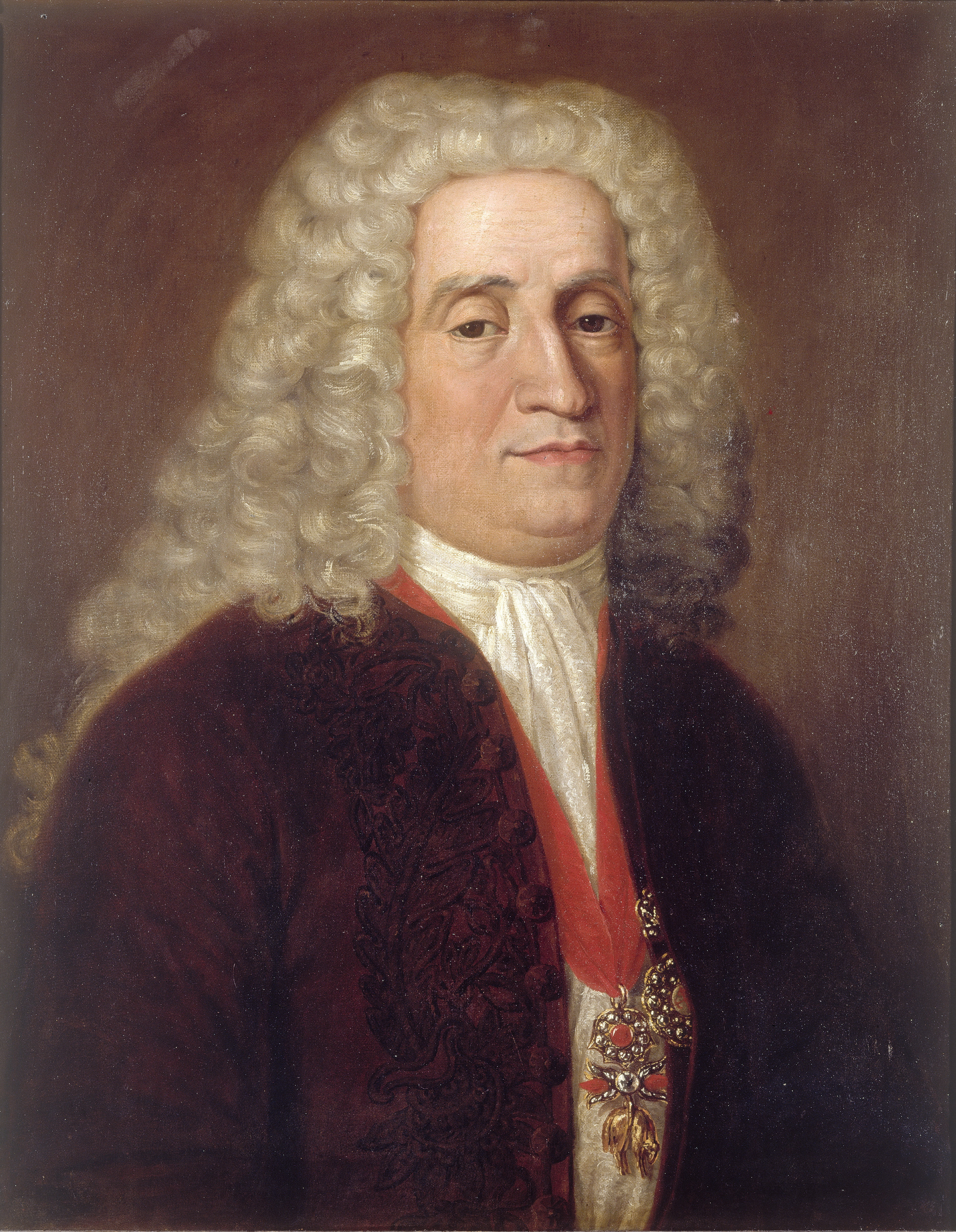
Portrait of José Patiño, by Jean Ranc

On 5 July a solemn Te Deum was sung in Oran to commemorate the victory. The news soon reached Spain and spread to the rest of Europe, where the famous victory was celebrated with festivals and religious ceremonies. Pope Clement XII was greatly contented to hear of the reclaiming of the cities, thanking and full of praise for Philip V of Spain. A month after the recovery of Oran, on 1 August, having secured the city, Montemar returned to Spain with most of his troops, leaving behind a garrison of 6,000 men.

Montemar was received with great expectation in Seville on 15 August. Philip V presented him with a chain of the Order of the Golden Fleece, a reward for the service to his country. José Patiño was rewarded with the same honour, as he had planned the expedition.

Bey Bouchelaghem was not resigned to the loss of his beloved city. Regretting the cowardice he had shown by abandoning the city, he tried many times to retrieve it, by attacking it over the following months. The Spaniards could not move into the interior however, and returned most of their forces to Spain, leaving the two cities with enough men to defend them. At the end of August the Bey closed in on Oran with more than 10,000 troops, but they were defeated by the Spanish, causing them more than 2,000 casualties. The Algerians attacked the city on 12 December then on June 10, 1733, without notable success. In 1734, Bouchelaghem attacked the center of El-Ayoun around Oran and reached the gates of the city, but was unable to occupy it. Oran and Mers-el-Kebir remained under tight siege for more than fifty years. The city was to remain under Spanish control until 1792.
