= Siege of Oran (1707–1708) =

1707–1708 siege during the Spanish-Algerian conflicts

Date	1 November, 1707 – 4 April, 1708 (5 months and 3 days)
Location	Oran, Mers el Kébir, Aïn El Turk
Result	Algerian victory
Territorial changes	Spanish Oran seized by Algiers

Belligerents
Regency of Algiers: Beylik of Mascara	Kingdom of Spain: Spanish Oran

Commanders and leaders
Bouchelaghem Bey; Mohamed Bektach; Ouzoum Hassan	Philip V of Spain; Carlos Carafa; Melchor Avellaneda

Strength
Unknown, but high	A few thousand garrison troops Several more thousand reinforcements

Casualties and losses
Unknown	Unknown

The siege of Oran (1707–1708) was a battle between the Spanish Empire and the Regency of Algiers. It was started by Mustapha Bouchelaghem, the Bey of Mascara. The Algerian victory in the battle led to the city being reconquered by the Algerians for 24 years (1708–1732), before Spanish forces conquered the town in 1732.

== Background ==
In 1509, Spain conquered Oran from the Algerian Kingdom of Tlemcen. The Spanish garrison had to engage in a form of diplomacy with the local Algerian tribes, as to not get raided by them.

Despite Ottoman-Algerian attempts to seize the town, such as in 1563 all failed.

Around the start of the 18th century, relations with these tribes soured. The "peaceful Moors", tribes which engaged in commerce with the Spanish, refused to do so thanks to this drop in relations, isolating the town from North Africa, and forcing the Spanish to supply it through sea.

In 1703, the new governor of Oran, Don Carlos Carraja raided the Algerian Beni Ameur tribes. About 80 were killed and 250 were captured. This marked a rupture in Algerian and Spanish relations, which have been favorable since the Algerian-Moroccan war in 1701.

Taking advantage of the War of the Spanish succession, Dey Mohamed Bektash sent 8500 regular soldiers and many volunteers against Spanish Oran.

== Battle ==
Heading the army was the bey Mustapha ben Youssouf, better known by the Epithet Bouchelaghem or Bigotillos meaning man with a moustache.the ruler of Mazuna. The city of Oran was besieged by Bouchelaghem bey's forces and

The city, already under blockade by the Algerian navy entered a state of siege. On November 1, 1707, Ouzoum Hassan, a commander from Algiers sent his army to take the fort of Saint-Philippe, thus officially beginning the siege. The forces of the Beylik of Mascara commanded by Bouchelaghem arrived a few days later.

The bey took control of the heights of Aïdour, from where he bombarded the Spanish, effectively destroying their defences. The two towers defending Oran were overrun and the Bey took control over Oran on January 20, 1708 after 400 Spanish soldiers surrendered. The Algerian assault kept the pressure on the Spaniards this time in Mers El Kebir. Despite heavy fighting, the Algerians captured the city on April 4, and took 2000 captives, among them French officers and Maltese volunteers.

== Aftermath ==
The military success of the Algerians surprised the Spanish government but also all of the European states at that time. In the Muslim world it was seen as a victory over Christianity. The city of Oran was repopulated with people from all over the western beylik with an influx, in particular, of craftsmen and traders. It opened a first period, from 1708 to 1732, where the city was in the hands of the regency of Algiers before the Spaniards invaded it in 1732.

== Bibliography ==
- Abadie, Louis (2002-01-01). Oran et Mers el Kebir (in French). Serre éditeur. p. 128. ISBN 978-2-906431-53-9.
- Jamieson, Alan G. (2013). Lords of the Sea: A History of the Barbary Corsairs. Reaktion Books. ISBN 978-1-86189-946-0.
- الجيلالي, عبد الرحمن (1994). تاريخ الجزائر العام للعلامة عبد الرحمن الجيلالي الجزء الثالث: الخاص بالفترة بين 1514 إلى 1830م [The General History of Algeria by Abd al-Rahman al-Jilali, Part Three: Concerning the period between 1514 and 1830 AD] (in Arabic). الجزائر: الشركة الوطنية للنشر والتوزيع.
- المدنى, أحمد توفيق (1965). كتاب حرب الثلاثمائة سنة بين الجزائر واسبانيا 1492 – 1792 [The Three Hundred Years' War between Algeria and Spain 1492 - 1792] (in Arabic). الجزائر: الشركة الوطنية للنشر والتوزيع.
- Chitour, Chems-Eddine (2004-01-01). Algérie : le passé revisité : une brève histoire de l'Algérie (in French). Casbah Editions. ISBN 9789961644966.
- Salinas, Alfred (2004-01-01). Oran la joyeuse (in French). L'Harmattan. p. 319. ISBN 978-2-7475-6585-1.
