= Mustapha Bouchelaghem =

Bey of the Western Beylik

Bey Bouchelaghem Bey
- الباي بوشلاغم

Bey of the Western Beylik
- In office 1686–1734/37
- Appointed by: Mezzo Morto
- Preceded by: Shaaban Bey
- Succeeded by: Youcef Bey of Mascara

Personal details
- Born: Mustapha Ben Youcef El-Mesrati مصطفى بن يوسف المسراتي; 17th century Near Mascara, Algeria
- Died: 1734/1737 Mostaganem
- Resting place: Bouchelaghem mausoleum, near Mostaganem
- Citizenship: Regency of Algiers

Military service
- Years of service: 1686–1732
- Battles/wars: Maghrebi war (1699–1702); Mascara campaign (1699-1701); Battle of Chelif; Oran Expedition (1707); Reconquest of Oran (1708); Spanish-Algerian War (1732)

Mustapha Ben Youcef El-Mesrati, also known as Bey Bouchelaghem, was the Bey of the Western Beylik from 1686 to 1734/37.

== Origins and early life ==
Mustapha, born as Mustapha ben Youcef was the son of an Algerian Zenetian Berber man called Youcef el-Mesrati, a noble from the Kalaa of Beni Rached, and an Algerian woman. His father served as Khalifa (lieutenant-governor) to the Bey of Constantine. He moved back to Mostaganem where he had eight children, the first-born being Mustapha. Several of his siblings would also later become Beys of Oran.

His full name was Mustapha ben Youcef Ben Mohamed ben Ishaq el-Mesrati. The name Bouchelaghem, and its Spanish version "El Bigotillos," was an epithet referring to his Moustache.

== Bey ==
He was elected as Bey in 1686, after the previous bey Chaban-ez-Zenagui was killed in front of Oran.

In 1701 he moved his capital to Mascara, and built a garrison there. The reason for this was its more central location. He worked hard to accumulate a large army mainly composed of thousands of Arab-Berber tribal levy.

=== Early wars (1680s–1708) ===
==== Conflicts with Morocco ====
In 1699 the Maghrebi war started, which was a conflict between Algiers and the other Barbary States. In the same year his territory was invaded by the Moroccans during the Mascara campaign led by one of Moulay Ismail’s sons, during which his palace was looted, however this campaign resulted in a peace negotiation which infuriated Moulay Ismail causing him to direct another attempted invasion. In 1701 with the help of Hajj Mustapha Dey, he decisively defeated the Moroccan armies in the Battle of Chelif.

In 1707 he got into another conflict with the Moroccans as Mulay Ismael sought to once again take over Western Algeria, and he thus sent an expedition to do so. Bouchelaghem was able to push them back.

==== Conflicts with Spain ====
In 1703 Spanish troops attacked the Beni Ameur tribe, which was loyal to Algiers, thus souring the relationship between the two countries. Following that, he started building his army up, in preparation for an offensive. He also ordered tribes around Oran to start harassing Spanish troops.His most important conquest though was that of Oran. In 1707, while Spain was preoccupied with the War of the Spanish Succession, he with the help of Ouzoum Hassan a Commander directly from Algiers captured the fort of Saint-Philippe near Oran, thus beginning the siege. After 6 months, Oran and Mers el Kébir fell to his hands.

He moved his capital to Oran, which he made a base for Barbary pirates, and constructed a small fleet to protect the town.

=== Peaceful period (1708–1732) ===
In 1710 a revolution led by Baba Ali Chaouch happened in Algiers. The new king achieved de facto independence from the Ottoman Empire, and he started purging unloyal elements. In the Beylik of Constantine alone 3 Beys were replaced in the same year. Bey Bouchelaghem was not replaced, mainly thanks to his popularity and neutrality. During this period, he built the defences up, and invested in regional wealth.

=== Spanish siege of Oran ===
In 1732, Spain invaded Oran and Mers el Kébir. After defeating the Algerian fleets protecting the city, they set foot on the shores of the city, and after a brutal siege, they captured Oran.

=== Death ===
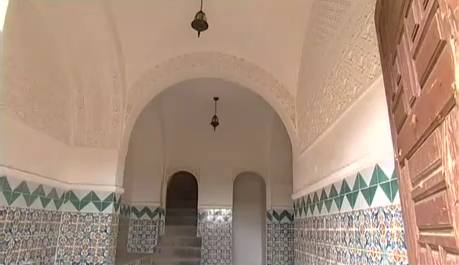
The mausoleum of Bey Bouchelaghem and his wife.

Bey Bouchelaghem retreated to Mostaganem, and became depressed after the losing the city. He died in 1734 or 1737 (sources conflict). He was succeeded by his brother. He was Bey of Oran for 51 years, the longest reigning Bey. He is buried in his own mausoleum.
