= 2026 ITF Men's World Tennis Tour (April–June) =

The 2026 ITF Men's World Tennis Tour (1 April–24 June 2026), or the 2026 Men's World Tennis Tour (25–30 June 2026 and beyond), is the 2026 edition of the second-tier tour for men's professional tennis. It is organised by the International Tennis Federation–World Tennis and is a tier below the ATP Challenger Tour. The ITF Men's World Tennis Tour includes tournaments with prize money ranging from $15,000 to $25,000.

Since 2022, following the Russian invasion of Ukraine the ITF announced that players from Belarus and Russia could still play on the tour but would not be allowed to play under the flag of Belarus or Russia.

== Key ==
M25 tournaments
M15 tournaments

== Month ==
=== April ===
| Week of | Tournament | Winner | Runners-up | Semifinalists | Quarterfinalists |
|---|---|---|---|---|---|
| April 6 | Maanshan, China; Hard (i); M25; Singles and doubles draws | (Switzerland) Luca Castelnuovo; Walkover | (Japan) Akira Santillan | (Australia) James McCabe (United Kingdom) Charles Broom | (Czech Republic) Dominik Palán (Australia) Matthew Dellavedova; Evgeny Philippov (France) Arthur Weber |
| April 6 | Maanshan, China; Hard (i); M25; Singles and doubles draws | (China) Liu Shaoyun (China) Zeng Yaojie; 7–6^{(8–6)}, 7–5 | (China) Yang Mingyuan (China) Zhang Tianhui | (Australia) James McCabe (United Kingdom) Charles Broom | (Czech Republic) Dominik Palán (Australia) Matthew Dellavedova; Evgeny Philippov (France) Arthur Weber |
| April 6 | Santa Margherita di Pula, Italy; Clay; M25; Singles and doubles draws | (France) Florent Bax; 4–6, 6–4, 6–2 | (Germany) Max Schönhaus | Andrey Chepelev (Germany) Mika Petkovic | (Italy) Lorenzo Carboni (Netherlands) Max Houkes (South Africa) Philip Henning (Germany) Tim Handel |
| April 6 | Santa Margherita di Pula, Italy; Clay; M25; Singles and doubles draws | (Italy) Jacopo Bilardo (Germany) Kai Wehnelt; 7–6^{(7–5)}, 6–4 | (United Kingdom) Finn Bass (Bulgaria) Anthony Genov | Andrey Chepelev (Germany) Mika Petkovic | (Italy) Lorenzo Carboni (Netherlands) Max Houkes (South Africa) Philip Henning (Germany) Tim Handel |
| April 6 | Sharm El Sheikh, Egypt; Hard; M25; Singles and doubles draws | (Czech Republic) Daniel Siniakov; 6–0, 6–3 | Grigory Shebekin | (India) Karan Singh (Slovakia) Michal Krajčí | (United Kingdom) Paul Jubb (Egypt) Fares Zakaria (Czech Republic) Marek Gengel; Semen Pankin |
| April 6 | Sharm El Sheikh, Egypt; Hard; M25; Singles and doubles draws | (Netherlands) Daniel de Jonge (Germany) Jannik Opitz; 7–5, 6–4 | Nikita Ianin (Germany) Cedric Stanke | (India) Karan Singh (Slovakia) Michal Krajčí | (United Kingdom) Paul Jubb (Egypt) Fares Zakaria (Czech Republic) Marek Gengel; Semen Pankin |
| April 6 | Monastir, Tunisia; Hard; M25; Singles and doubles draws | (Belgium) Gauthier Onclin; 4–6, 6–3, 6–3 | (Belgium) Jack Logé | Alibek Kachmazov (Bulgaria) Petr Nesterov | (Italy) Federico Iannaccone (France) Nicolas Robert (Ukraine) Oleksandr Ovcharenko (Turkey) Yankı Erel |
| April 6 | Monastir, Tunisia; Hard; M25; Singles and doubles draws | (Tunisia) Skander Mansouri (Austria) Maximilian Neuchrist; 7–6^{(7–4)}, 7–5 | (Italy) Federico Iannaccone (Ukraine) Georgii Kravchenko | Alibek Kachmazov (Bulgaria) Petr Nesterov | (Italy) Federico Iannaccone (France) Nicolas Robert (Ukraine) Oleksandr Ovcharenko (Turkey) Yankı Erel |
| April 6 | Heraklion, Greece; Hard; M15; Singles and doubles draws | (Romania) Gabriel Ghețu; 7–6^{(7–3)}, 7–5 | (United Kingdom) Hamish Stewart | (Romania) Radu Mihai Papoe (France) Cyril Vandermeersch | (France) Louis Larue (Ukraine) Aleksandr Braynin (Belgium) Lars Goran Verwerft (United States) Miles Jones |
| April 6 | Heraklion, Greece; Hard; M15; Singles and doubles draws | (Ukraine) Aleksandr Braynin (Ukraine) Volodymyr Iakubenko; 7–6^{(7–3)}, 6–2 | (France) Louis Larue (France) Benjamin Pietri | (Romania) Radu Mihai Papoe (France) Cyril Vandermeersch | (France) Louis Larue (Ukraine) Aleksandr Braynin (Belgium) Lars Goran Verwerft (United States) Miles Jones |
| April 6 | Monastir, Tunisia; Hard; M15; Singles and doubles draws | (New Zealand) Anton Shepp; 6–2, 7–5 | (Tunisia) Aziz Ouakaa | (Czech Republic) Matthew William Donald (Italy) Leonardo Rossi | (France) Nicolas Tepmahc (Sweden) John Hallquist Lithén (Poland) Alan Ważny (Senegal) Seydina André |
| April 6 | Monastir, Tunisia; Hard; M15; Singles and doubles draws | (Senegal) Seydina André (France) Nicolas Jadoun; 7–6^{(7–1)}, 7–5 | (France) Maxence Beauge (France) Valentin de Carvalho | (Czech Republic) Matthew William Donald (Italy) Leonardo Rossi | (France) Nicolas Tepmahc (Sweden) John Hallquist Lithén (Poland) Alan Ważny (Senegal) Seydina André |
| April 6 | Boca Raton, United States; Clay; M15; Singles and doubles draws | (United States) Jack Kennedy; 6–3, 6–4 | (Norway) Andreja Petrovic | (United States) Jacob Brumm (Puerto Rico) Yannik Álvarez | (Argentina) Ignacio Monzón (United States) Mwendwa Mbithi (United States) Keaton Hance (United States) Benjamin Willwerth |
| April 6 | Boca Raton, United States; Clay; M15; Singles and doubles draws | (United States) Alexander Kotzen (Norway) Andreja Petrovic; 3–6, 6–3, [10–2] | (United States) Jeffrey Fradkin (United States) William Grant | (United States) Jacob Brumm (Puerto Rico) Yannik Álvarez | (Argentina) Ignacio Monzón (United States) Mwendwa Mbithi (United States) Keaton Hance (United States) Benjamin Willwerth |
| April 13 | Anning, China; Clay; M25; Singles and doubles draws | (Northern Mariana Islands) Colin Sinclair; 6–3, 6–0 | (Poland) Filip Peliwo | (Australia) Sam Ryan Ziegann (United States) Michael Zhu | (Chinese Taipei) Lee Kuan-yi (Japan) Yuta Kawahashi (Australia) Matthew Dellavedova (China) Zhang Minghui |
| April 13 | Anning, China; Clay; M25; Singles and doubles draws | (Zimbabwe) Courtney John Lock (United States) Michael Zhu; 7–6^{(7–4)}, 7–6^{(7–3)} | (China) Yang Zijiang (China) Zheng Zhan | (Australia) Sam Ryan Ziegann (United States) Michael Zhu | (Chinese Taipei) Lee Kuan-yi (Japan) Yuta Kawahashi (Australia) Matthew Dellavedova (China) Zhang Minghui |
| April 13 | Santa Margherita di Pula, Italy; Clay; M25; Singles and doubles draws | (France) Moïse Kouamé; 6–3, 4–6, 6–3 | (Italy) Juan Cruz Martin Manzano | (Italy) Lorenzo Carboni (South Africa) Philip Henning | (Italy) Francesco Forti (Italy) Gianmarco Ferrari; Andrey Chepelev (Germany) Marvin Möller |
| April 13 | Santa Margherita di Pula, Italy; Clay; M25; Singles and doubles draws | (United States) Zachary Fuchs (United Kingdom) James Hopper; 3–2 ret. | (Italy) Tommaso Compagnucci (Italy) Juan Cruz Martin Manzano | (Italy) Lorenzo Carboni (South Africa) Philip Henning | (Italy) Francesco Forti (Italy) Gianmarco Ferrari; Andrey Chepelev (Germany) Marvin Möller |
| April 13 | Sharm El Sheikh, Egypt; Hard; M25; Singles and doubles draws | (Australia) Thomas Fancutt; 6–3, 7–6^{(7–3)} | (Latvia) Robert Strombachs | (Italy) Alessandro Pecci; Semen Pankin | Anton Arzhankin (New Zealand) Ajeet Rai (Ukraine) Vadym Ursu (India) Karan Singh |
| April 13 | Sharm El Sheikh, Egypt; Hard; M25; Singles and doubles draws | (Slovakia) Lukáš Pokorný (Germany) Niklas Schell; 7–6^{(7–4)}, 6–4 | (Cyprus) Eleftherios Neos; Semen Pankin | (Italy) Alessandro Pecci; Semen Pankin | Anton Arzhankin (New Zealand) Ajeet Rai (Ukraine) Vadym Ursu (India) Karan Singh |
| April 13 | Monastir, Tunisia; Hard; M25; Singles and doubles draws | (Turkey) Yankı Erel; 6–1, 6–1 | (France) Robin Bertrand | (Spain) John Echeverría (Slovenia) Filip Jeff Planinšek | (France) Liam Branger (Bulgaria) Petr Nesterov (Belgium) Jack Logé (Czech Republic) Matthew William Donald |
| April 13 | Monastir, Tunisia; Hard; M25; Singles and doubles draws | (Tunisia) Skander Mansouri (Austria) Maximilian Neuchrist; 7–5, 6–2 | (France) César Bouchelaghem (Slovenia) Filip Jeff Planinšek | (Spain) John Echeverría (Slovenia) Filip Jeff Planinšek | (France) Liam Branger (Bulgaria) Petr Nesterov (Belgium) Jack Logé (Czech Republic) Matthew William Donald |
| April 13 | Singapore; Hard (i); M15; Singles and doubles draws | (Japan) Koki Matsuda; 6–4, 6–4 | (South Korea) Oh Chan-yeong | (Australia) Cruz Hewitt (Indonesia) Muhammad Rifqi Fitriadi | (Luxembourg) Alex Knaff (United Kingdom) Emile Hudd (Thailand) Thantub Suksumrarn (Japan) Taketo Takamisawa |
| April 13 | Singapore; Hard (i); M15; Singles and doubles draws | (United Kingdom) Emile Hudd (Australia) Matt Hulme; 6–3, 6–2 | (Australia) Chen Dong (Australia) Cruz Hewitt | (Australia) Cruz Hewitt (Indonesia) Muhammad Rifqi Fitriadi | (Luxembourg) Alex Knaff (United Kingdom) Emile Hudd (Thailand) Thantub Suksumrarn (Japan) Taketo Takamisawa |
| April 13 | Ceuta, Spain; Hard; M15; Singles and doubles draws | (Spain) Izan Almazán Valiente; 6–4, 3–6, 6–1 | (Spain) Alejandro Turriziani Álvarez | (Spain) Rafael Izquierdo Luque (France) Yanis Ghazouani Durand | (Poland) Karol Filar; Pavel Lagutin (Germany) Marlon Vankan (United States) Enzo Wallart |
| April 13 | Ceuta, Spain; Hard; M15; Singles and doubles draws | (Switzerland) Adrien Burdet (France) Alexandre Reco; 6–4, 6–4 | (Portugal) Hugo Maia (Portugal) Guilherme Valdoleiros | (Spain) Rafael Izquierdo Luque (France) Yanis Ghazouani Durand | (Poland) Karol Filar; Pavel Lagutin (Germany) Marlon Vankan (United States) Enzo Wallart |
| April 13 | Dubrovnik, Croatia; Clay; M15; Singles and doubles draws | (France) Felix Balshaw; 6–4, 6–2 | (Netherlands) Sander Jong | (Germany) John Sperle (Spain) David Jordà Sanchis | (Czech Republic) Jakub Nicod (Italy) Gabriele Maria Noce (Spain) Sergio Callejón Hernando (Serbia) Dušan Obradović |
| April 13 | Dubrovnik, Croatia; Clay; M15; Singles and doubles draws | (Serbia) Ivan Sabanov (Serbia) Matej Sabanov; 6–2, 6–2 | (Croatia) Emanuel Ivanišević (Croatia) Josip Šimundža | (Germany) John Sperle (Spain) David Jordà Sanchis | (Czech Republic) Jakub Nicod (Italy) Gabriele Maria Noce (Spain) Sergio Callejón Hernando (Serbia) Dušan Obradović |
| April 13 | Heraklion, Greece; Hard; M15; Singles and doubles draws | (Romania) Gabriel Ghețu; 7–6^{(7–5)}, 6–4 | (Netherlands) Alec Deckers | (France) Cyril Vandermeersch (France) Leo Raquillet | (United Kingdom) Finn Murgett (Czech Republic) Jiří Čížek (Germany) Adrian Oetzbach (United States) Miles Jones |
| April 13 | Heraklion, Greece; Hard; M15; Singles and doubles draws | (United Kingdom) Finn Murgett (United Kingdom) Marcus Walters; 7–5, 6–7^{(4–7)}, [10–4] | (Netherlands) Alec Deckers (Germany) Adrian Oetzbach | (France) Cyril Vandermeersch (France) Leo Raquillet | (United Kingdom) Finn Murgett (Czech Republic) Jiří Čížek (Germany) Adrian Oetzbach (United States) Miles Jones |
| April 13 | Pretoria, South Africa; Hard; M15; Singles and doubles draws | (Turkey) Tuncay Duran; 6–3, 6–4 | (South Africa) Alec Beckley | (Belgium) Romain Faucon (Germany) Marc Majdandzic | (Germany) Stefan Seifert (Turkey) Mert Naci Türker (Germany) Tom Zeuch; Alexander Zgirovsky |
| April 13 | Pretoria, South Africa; Hard; M15; Singles and doubles draws | (United Kingdom) Stefan Cooper (Italy) Giulio Perego; 6–2, 6–4 | (South Africa) Vasilios Caripi (Costa Rica) Jesse Flores | (Belgium) Romain Faucon (Germany) Marc Majdandzic | (Germany) Stefan Seifert (Turkey) Mert Naci Türker (Germany) Tom Zeuch; Alexander Zgirovsky |
| April 13 | Monastir, Tunisia; Hard; M15; Singles and doubles draws | (Romania) Sebastian Gima; Walkover | (Italy) Giorgio Tabacco | (France) Loann Massard (Algeria) Toufik Sahtali | (Belgium) Émilien Demanet (Syria) Hazem Naw (France) Nicolas Tepmahc (Italy) Leonardo Rossi |
| April 13 | Monastir, Tunisia; Hard; M15; Singles and doubles draws | (Tunisia) Aziz Ouakaa (Algeria) Toufik Sahtali; Walkover | (Italy) Fausto Tabacco (Italy) Giorgio Tabacco | (France) Loann Massard (Algeria) Toufik Sahtali | (Belgium) Émilien Demanet (Syria) Hazem Naw (France) Nicolas Tepmahc (Italy) Leonardo Rossi |
| April 13 | Orlando, United States; Clay; M15; Singles and doubles draws | (France) Corentin Denolly; 6–4, 6–3 | (The Bahamas) Justin Roberts | (United States) Adam Lynch (United States) Michael Antonius | (United Kingdom) Toby Martin (Puerto Rico) Yannik Álvarez (Romania) Dragoș Nicolae Cazacu (United States) Nikolas Stoot |
| April 13 | Orlando, United States; Clay; M15; Singles and doubles draws | (Puerto Rico) Yannik Álvarez (United States) Ryan Cozad; 6–2, 6–4 | (Canada) Benjamin Thomas George (Peru) Christopher Li | (United States) Adam Lynch (United States) Michael Antonius | (United Kingdom) Toby Martin (Puerto Rico) Yannik Álvarez (Romania) Dragoș Nicolae Cazacu (United States) Nikolas Stoot |
| April 20 | Luzhou, China; Hard; M25; Singles and doubles draws | (United Kingdom) Alastair Gray; 6–1, 6–4 | (China) Cui Jie | (Switzerland) Luca Castelnuovo (United Kingdom) Giles Hussey | (Australia) Joshua Charlton (Japan) Takuya Kumasaka (Australia) Blake Ellis (Japan) Kokoro Isomura |
| April 20 | Luzhou, China; Hard; M25; Singles and doubles draws | (Australia) Joshua Charlton (China) Wang Aoran; 6–7^{(5–7)}, 6–2, [11–9] | (Chinese Taipei) Jeffrey Hsu (Thailand) Wishaya Trongcharoenchaikul | (Switzerland) Luca Castelnuovo (United Kingdom) Giles Hussey | (Australia) Joshua Charlton (Japan) Takuya Kumasaka (Australia) Blake Ellis (Japan) Kokoro Isomura |
| April 20 | Angers, France; Clay (i); M25; Singles and doubles draws | (Spain) Iñaki Montes de la Torre; 6–2, 6–4 | (Spain) Oriol Roca Batalla | (Finland) Eero Vasa (Spain) Sergio Callejón Hernando | (Spain) Daniel Rincón (France) Matteo Martineau (France) Geoffrey Blancaneaux (United Kingdom) Anton Matusevich |
| April 20 | Angers, France; Clay (i); M25; Singles and doubles draws | (United Kingdom) Finn Bass (Bulgaria) Anthony Genov; 6–4, 6–2 | (France) Marko Maric (Serbia) Tadija Radovanović | (Finland) Eero Vasa (Spain) Sergio Callejón Hernando | (Spain) Daniel Rincón (France) Matteo Martineau (France) Geoffrey Blancaneaux (United Kingdom) Anton Matusevich |
| April 20 | Santa Margherita di Pula, Italy; Clay; M25; Singles and doubles draws | (Italy) Francesco Forti; 3–6, 6–3, 6–1 | (Italy) Federico Arnaboldi | (Italy) Manuel Mazza (Italy) Giovanni Oradini | (Italy) Lorenzo Angelini; Andrey Chepelev (Switzerland) Noah Lopez (Italy) Tommaso Compagnucci |
| April 20 | Santa Margherita di Pula, Italy; Clay; M25; Singles and doubles draws | (Italy) Francesco Forti (Italy) Lorenzo Rottoli; 6–1, 6–4 | (Italy) Tommaso Compagnucci (Italy) Manuel Mazza | (Italy) Manuel Mazza (Italy) Giovanni Oradini | (Italy) Lorenzo Angelini; Andrey Chepelev (Switzerland) Noah Lopez (Italy) Tommaso Compagnucci |
| April 20 | Sharm El Sheikh, Egypt; Hard; M25; Singles and doubles draws | Alibek Kachmazov; 6–3, 6–4 | Anton Arzhankin | (Sweden) Olle Wallin (Czech Republic) Marek Gengel | (Germany) Jannik Opitz (Egypt) Michael Bassem Sobhy (Egypt) Fares Zakaria (Ukraine) Vadym Ursu |
| April 20 | Sharm El Sheikh, Egypt; Hard; M25; Singles and doubles draws | (Australia) Thomas Fancutt (New Zealand) Ajeet Rai; 7–6^{(7–3)}, 6–1 | (Slovakia) Lukáš Pokorný (Germany) Niklas Schell | (Sweden) Olle Wallin (Czech Republic) Marek Gengel | (Germany) Jannik Opitz (Egypt) Michael Bassem Sobhy (Egypt) Fares Zakaria (Ukraine) Vadym Ursu |
| April 20 | Xalapa, Mexico; Hard; M25; Singles and doubles draws | (Netherlands) Mees Röttgering; 6–4, 6–3 | (Mexico) Rodrigo Pacheco Méndez | (United States) Jerry Roddick (Mexico) Alex Hernández | (Mexico) Rodrigo Alujas (United States) Daniel Milavsky (Mexico) Rafael de Alba (France) Timo Legout |
| April 20 | Xalapa, Mexico; Hard; M25; Singles and doubles draws | (United States) Pranav Kumar (United States) Daniel Milavsky; 7–5, 5–7, [10–8] | (Mexico) Alejandro Hayen (United States) Jerry Roddick | (United States) Jerry Roddick (Mexico) Alex Hernández | (Mexico) Rodrigo Alujas (United States) Daniel Milavsky (Mexico) Rafael de Alba (France) Timo Legout |
| April 20 | Singapore; Hard (i); M15; Singles and doubles draws | (United States) Tristan Stringer; 7–6^{(7–1)}, 2–6, 6–3 | (New Zealand) Anton Shepp | (Czech Republic) Dominik Palán (Japan) Hikaru Shiraishi | (Thailand) Thantub Suksumrarn (Australia) Matt Hulme (United Kingdom) Emile Hudd (Australia) Cruz Hewitt |
| April 20 | Singapore; Hard (i); M15; Singles and doubles draws | (Japan) Hikaru Shiraishi (Japan) Riku Takahata; 6–7^{(3–7)}, 6–1, [10–8] | (Japan) Yuichiro Inui (Japan) Kosuke Ogura | (Czech Republic) Dominik Palán (Japan) Hikaru Shiraishi | (Thailand) Thantub Suksumrarn (Australia) Matt Hulme (United Kingdom) Emile Hudd (Australia) Cruz Hewitt |
| April 20 | Sanxenxo, Spain; Hard; M15; Singles and doubles draws | (United Kingdom) Henry Searle; 6–4, 6–2 | (Portugal) Tiago Torres | (Spain) Izan Almazán Valiente (Poland) Alan Ważny | (Switzerland) Patrick Schoen (Portugal) Diogo Marques (Spain) Tomás Currás Abasolo (France) Alexandre Reco |
| April 20 | Sanxenxo, Spain; Hard; M15; Singles and doubles draws | (Spain) Rafael Izquierdo Luque (Portugal) Diogo Marques; 3–6, 7–6^{(7–4)}, [11–9] | (Luxembourg) Louis Van Herck (Germany) Marlon Vankan | (Spain) Izan Almazán Valiente (Poland) Alan Ważny | (Switzerland) Patrick Schoen (Portugal) Diogo Marques (Spain) Tomás Currás Abasolo (France) Alexandre Reco |
| April 20 | Heraklion, Greece; Hard; M15; Singles and doubles draws | (Cyprus) Melios Efstathiou; 2–6, 6–3, 6–2 | (Ukraine) Nikita Mashtakov | (France) Cyril Vandermeersch (United Kingdom) Jeremy Gschwendtner | (France) Leo Raquillet (United Kingdom) Finn Murgett (United States) Miles Jones (France) Benjamin Pietri |
| April 20 | Heraklion, Greece; Hard; M15; Singles and doubles draws | (United Kingdom) Finn Murgett (United Kingdom) Marcus Walters; 6–2, 6–0 | (United States) Alex Jones (United States) Miles Jones | (France) Cyril Vandermeersch (United Kingdom) Jeremy Gschwendtner | (France) Leo Raquillet (United Kingdom) Finn Murgett (United States) Miles Jones (France) Benjamin Pietri |
| April 20 | Pretoria, South Africa; Hard; M15; Singles and doubles draws | (Costa Rica) Jesse Flores; 6–4, 6–1 | (Turkey) Tuncay Duran | (Germany) Marc Majdandzic (Switzerland) Gian Luca Tanner | (South Africa) Marc van der Merwe (Belgium) Romain Faucon (Netherlands) Fons van Sambeek (Turkey) Melih Anavatan |
| April 20 | Pretoria, South Africa; Hard; M15; Singles and doubles draws | Doubles competition was cancelled due to ongoing poor weather | | (Germany) Marc Majdandzic (Switzerland) Gian Luca Tanner | (South Africa) Marc van der Merwe (Belgium) Romain Faucon (Netherlands) Fons van Sambeek (Turkey) Melih Anavatan |
| April 20 | Monastir, Tunisia; Hard; M15; Singles and doubles draws | (Tunisia) Aziz Ouakaa; Walkover | (Algeria) Toufik Sahtali | (France) Nicolas Tepmahc (Italy) Fausto Tabacco | (Bulgaria) Anas Mazdrashki (Italy) Gabriele Bosio (France) Loann Massard (Australia) Jacob Bradshaw |
| April 20 | Monastir, Tunisia; Hard; M15; Singles and doubles draws | (Italy) Gabriele Bosio (Italy) Riccardo Perin; Walkover | (Tunisia) Aziz Ouakaa (Tunisia) Alaa Trifi | (France) Nicolas Tepmahc (Italy) Fausto Tabacco | (Bulgaria) Anas Mazdrashki (Italy) Gabriele Bosio (France) Loann Massard (Australia) Jacob Bradshaw |
| April 20 | Orlando, United States; Clay; M15; Singles and doubles draws | (United States) Keaton Hance; Walkover | (United States) Cannon Kingsley | (The Bahamas) Justin Roberts (Romania) Daniel Uță | (United States) Felix Corwin (Chile) Bastián Malla (Canada) Benjamin Thomas George (United States) Gus Grumet |
| April 20 | Orlando, United States; Clay; M15; Singles and doubles draws | (United States) Keaton Hance (United States) Jordan Lee; 6–3, 6–3 | (United States) Izyan Ahmad (United States) Tomas Laukys | (The Bahamas) Justin Roberts (Romania) Daniel Uță | (United States) Felix Corwin (Chile) Bastián Malla (Canada) Benjamin Thomas George (United States) Gus Grumet |
| April 20 | Quito, Ecuador; Clay; M15; Singles and doubles draws | (Argentina) Fernando Cavallo; 6–3, 7–6^{(7–2)} | (Norway) Herman Hoeyeraal | (Ecuador) Ángel Véliz (Colombia) Sergio Hernandez | (Argentina) Tomás Farjat (Argentina) Manuel Mouilleron Salvo (Brazil) Victor Braga (United States) Ryan Dickerson |
| April 20 | Quito, Ecuador; Clay; M15; Singles and doubles draws | (United States) Ryan Dickerson (Canada) Volodymyr Gurenko; 6–3, 6–2 | (Brazil) Breno Braga (Brazil) Victor Hugo Remondy Pagotto | (Ecuador) Ángel Véliz (Colombia) Sergio Hernandez | (Argentina) Tomás Farjat (Argentina) Manuel Mouilleron Salvo (Brazil) Victor Braga (United States) Ryan Dickerson |
| April 27 | Nakhon Pathom, Thailand; Hard; M25; Singles and doubles draws | (South Korea) Chung Hyeon; 6–4, 6–2 | (Thailand) Kasidit Samrej | (Malaysia) Mitsuki Wei Kang Leong (Japan) Masamichi Imamura | (India) Sidharth Rawat (Japan) Takuya Kumasaka (Australia) Cruz Hewitt (Australia) Moerani Bouzige |
| April 27 | Nakhon Pathom, Thailand; Hard; M25; Singles and doubles draws | (Japan) Shinji Hazawa (Japan) Yamato Sueoka; 6–2, 6–2 | (India) S D Prajwal Dev (India) Nitin Kumar Sinha | (Malaysia) Mitsuki Wei Kang Leong (Japan) Masamichi Imamura | (India) Sidharth Rawat (Japan) Takuya Kumasaka (Australia) Cruz Hewitt (Australia) Moerani Bouzige |
| April 27 | Nottingham, United Kingdom; Hard; M25; Singles and doubles draws | (United Kingdom) Anton Matusevich; 7–6^{(8–6)}, 7–6^{(11–9)} | (United Kingdom) Henry Searle | (Germany) Patrick Zahraj (France) Leo Raquillet | (United Kingdom) Rhys Lawlor (United Kingdom) Finn Murgett (United Kingdom) Marcus Walters (United Kingdom) Emile Hudd |
| April 27 | Nottingham, United Kingdom; Hard; M25; Singles and doubles draws | (Bosnia and Herzegovina) Nemanja Malešević (United Kingdom) Joe Tyler; 7–6^{(7–4)}, 6–3 | (United States) Alex Jones (United States) Miles Jones | (Germany) Patrick Zahraj (France) Leo Raquillet | (United Kingdom) Rhys Lawlor (United Kingdom) Finn Murgett (United Kingdom) Marcus Walters (United Kingdom) Emile Hudd |
| April 27 | Quinta do Lago, Portugal; Hard; M25; Singles and doubles draws | (France) Lucas Poullain; 6–7^{(7–9)}, 6–2, 7–5 | (Spain) John Echeverría | (Canada) Justin Boulais (Switzerland) Patrick Schoen | (Portugal) Tiago Pereira (Sweden) Olle Wallin (Spain) Rafael Izquierdo Luque (Germany) Florian Broska |
| April 27 | Quinta do Lago, Portugal; Hard; M25; Singles and doubles draws | (Australia) Thomas Fancutt (New Zealand) Ajeet Rai; 6–3, 7–6^{(7–2)} | (Spain) John Echeverría (Portugal) Tiago Torres | (Canada) Justin Boulais (Switzerland) Patrick Schoen | (Portugal) Tiago Pereira (Sweden) Olle Wallin (Spain) Rafael Izquierdo Luque (Germany) Florian Broska |
| April 27 | Castelldefels, Spain; Clay; M25; Singles and doubles draws | (Spain) Max Alcalá Gurri; 6–3, 6–1 | (Switzerland) Johan Nikles | (Spain) Daniel Rincón (Spain) Oriol Roca Batalla | (Spain) Sergi Pérez Contri (Spain) Àlex Martí Pujolràs (Bulgaria) Iliyan Radulov (Spain) Lucca Helguera Casado |
| April 27 | Castelldefels, Spain; Clay; M25; Singles and doubles draws | (Spain) Nicolás Álvarez Varona (Spain) Mario Mansilla Díez; Walkover | (Spain) Alberto Barroso Campos (Switzerland) Johan Nikles | (Spain) Daniel Rincón (Spain) Oriol Roca Batalla | (Spain) Sergi Pérez Contri (Spain) Àlex Martí Pujolràs (Bulgaria) Iliyan Radulov (Spain) Lucca Helguera Casado |
| April 27 | Santa Margherita di Pula, Italy; Clay; M25; Singles and doubles draws | (Ukraine) Eric Vanshelboim; 5–7, 6–2, 6–3 | (Italy) Niccolò Ciavarella | (Iran) Kasra Rahmani (Italy) Gianmarco Ferrari | (Italy) Pierluigi Basile (Serbia) Stefan Popović (Italy) Alessandro Battiston (Germany) Tim Handel |
| April 27 | Santa Margherita di Pula, Italy; Clay; M25; Singles and doubles draws | (Italy) Marco Furlanetto (Switzerland) Nicolás Parizzia; 6–3, 6–4 | (Bulgaria) Yanaki Milev (Serbia) Stefan Popović | (Iran) Kasra Rahmani (Italy) Gianmarco Ferrari | (Italy) Pierluigi Basile (Serbia) Stefan Popović (Italy) Alessandro Battiston (Germany) Tim Handel |
| April 27 | Luján, Argentina; Clay; M25; Singles and doubles draws | (Argentina) Carlos María Zárate; 6–2, 6–2 | (Argentina) Lucio Ratti | (Bolivia) Murkel Dellien (Brazil) Matheus Pucinelli de Almeida | (Argentina) Luciano Emanuel Ambrogi (Argentina) Lorenzo Joaquín Rodríguez (Argentina) Juan Bautista Torres (Brazil) Wilson Leite |
| April 27 | Luján, Argentina; Clay; M25; Singles and doubles draws | (Argentina) Luciano Emanuel Ambrogi (Argentina) Máximo Zeitune; 6–4, 7–6^{(7–3)} | (Argentina) Dante Pagani (Argentina) Lucio Ratti | (Bolivia) Murkel Dellien (Brazil) Matheus Pucinelli de Almeida | (Argentina) Luciano Emanuel Ambrogi (Argentina) Lorenzo Joaquín Rodríguez (Argentina) Juan Bautista Torres (Brazil) Wilson Leite |
| April 27 | Islamabad, Pakistan; Hard; M15; Singles and doubles draws | (Pakistan) Muhammad Shoaib; 7–6^{(7–5)}, 4–6, 6–2 | Nikita Ianin | (China) Meng Fanming (Sweden) Arvid Nordquist | (Sweden) Leo Borg (Turkey) Mert Naci Türker (Turkey) Kerem Yılmaz (Algeria) Samir Hamza Reguig |
| April 27 | Islamabad, Pakistan; Hard; M15; Singles and doubles draws | (Pakistan) Mohammad Abid Ali Khan Akbar (Pakistan) Muzammil Murtaza; 6–4, 2–6, [10–7] | (Pakistan) Aqeel Khan (Pakistan) Barkat Khan | (China) Meng Fanming (Sweden) Arvid Nordquist | (Sweden) Leo Borg (Turkey) Mert Naci Türker (Turkey) Kerem Yılmaz (Algeria) Samir Hamza Reguig |
| April 27 | Oegstgeest, Netherlands; Clay; M15; Singles and doubles draws | (Germany) Mika Petkovic; 6–4, 2–6, 6–1 | (Spain) Imanol López Morillo | (Germany) Liam Gavrielides (Belgium) Émilien Demanet | (France) Yannick Theodor Alexandrescou (Germany) Adrian Oetzbach (Hungary) Péter Makk (Belgium) Martin van der Meerschen |
| April 27 | Oegstgeest, Netherlands; Clay; M15; Singles and doubles draws | (France) Yannick Theodor Alexandrescou (Netherlands) Pieter de Lange; 6–4, 6–0 | (Netherlands) Edward Etty (Germany) Cedric Stanke | (Germany) Liam Gavrielides (Belgium) Émilien Demanet | (France) Yannick Theodor Alexandrescou (Germany) Adrian Oetzbach (Hungary) Péter Makk (Belgium) Martin van der Meerschen |
| April 27 | Mbombela, South Africa; Hard; M15; Singles and doubles draws | (South Africa) Alec Beckley; 7–5, 6–1 | (Italy) Giulio Perego | (Turkey) Tuncay Duran (Belgium) Romain Faucon | (Israel) Jordan Hasson (United Kingdom) Stefan Cooper (Australia) Benjamin O'Connell (Argentina) Franco Ribero |
| April 27 | Mbombela, South Africa; Hard; M15; Singles and doubles draws | (Belgium) Romain Faucon (United States) Leonardo Vega; 4–6, 6–4, [10–4] | (India) Madhwin Kamath (India) Atharva Sharma | (Turkey) Tuncay Duran (Belgium) Romain Faucon | (Israel) Jordan Hasson (United Kingdom) Stefan Cooper (Australia) Benjamin O'Connell (Argentina) Franco Ribero |
| April 27 | Hurghada, Egypt; Hard; M15; Singles and doubles draws | (Italy) Lorenzo Bocchi; 6–4, 6–4 | (Germany) Nino Ehrenschneider | (United Kingdom) Viktor Frydrych (Austria) Michael Glöckler | Saveliy Ivanov (Italy) Leonardo Rossi (Egypt) Karim Ibrahim (Ukraine) Yurii Dzhavakian |
| April 27 | Hurghada, Egypt; Hard; M15; Singles and doubles draws | (Germany) Nino Ehrenschneider (Germany) David Eichenseher; 4–6, 6–4, [12–10] | (Italy) Lorenzo Bocchi (Ukraine) Nikita Mashtakov | (United Kingdom) Viktor Frydrych (Austria) Michael Glöckler | Saveliy Ivanov (Italy) Leonardo Rossi (Egypt) Karim Ibrahim (Ukraine) Yurii Dzhavakian |
| April 27 | Monastir, Tunisia; Hard; M15; Singles and doubles draws | (Germany) Luca Wiedenmann; 6–4, 6–7^{(6–8)}, 6–2 | (Algeria) Toufik Sahtali | (Tunisia) Alaa Trifi (Italy) Gabriele Bosio | (Italy) Samuele Seghetti (Italy) Andrea Colombo (Australia) Jacob Bradshaw (France) Nicolas Tepmahc |
| April 27 | Monastir, Tunisia; Hard; M15; Singles and doubles draws | (United States) Milledge Cossu (Tunisia) Aziz Ouakaa; 6––3, 6–3 | (Italy) Andrea Colombo (Italy) Gilberto Ravasio | (Tunisia) Alaa Trifi (Italy) Gabriele Bosio | (Italy) Samuele Seghetti (Italy) Andrea Colombo (Australia) Jacob Bradshaw (France) Nicolas Tepmahc |
| April 27 | Orange Park, United States; Clay; M15; Singles and doubles draws | (Dominican Republic) Nick Hardt; 1–6, 6–1, 6–4 | (Norway) Andreja Petrovic | (France) Raphael Perot (United States) Keaton Hance | (Sweden) Jonathan Mridha (United States) Michael Antonius (United Kingdom) James Connel (United States) Matthew Segura |
| April 27 | Orange Park, United States; Clay; M15; Singles and doubles draws | (United States) Hunter Heck (United Kingdom) Oliver Okonkwo; 7–5, 6–3 | (United States) Dakotah Bobo (United States) Benjamin Koch | (France) Raphael Perot (United States) Keaton Hance | (Sweden) Jonathan Mridha (United States) Michael Antonius (United Kingdom) James Connel (United States) Matthew Segura |
| April 27 | Villahermosa, Mexico; Hard (i); M15; Singles and doubles draws | (United States) Daniel Milavsky; 7–6^{(7–3)}, 6–3 | (United States) Maxwell McKennon | Artem Alekseychuk (Mexico) Oswaldo Alejandro Reyes Tirado | (United States) Jerry Roddick (United States) Drew Van Orderlain (Canada) Volodymyr Gurenko (Mexico) Rodolfo Jauregui Sainz de Rozas |
| April 27 | Villahermosa, Mexico; Hard (i); M15; Singles and doubles draws | (United States) Jeffrey Fradkin (United States) Maxwell McKennon; 6–3, 6–2 | (Mexico) Rafael de Alba (Mexico) Alan Raúl Sau Franco | Artem Alekseychuk (Mexico) Oswaldo Alejandro Reyes Tirado | (United States) Jerry Roddick (United States) Drew Van Orderlain (Canada) Volodymyr Gurenko (Mexico) Rodolfo Jauregui Sainz de Rozas |
| April 27 | Quito, Ecuador; Clay; M15; Singles and doubles draws | (Colombia) Juan Sebastián Osorio; 6–2, 4–6, 6–3 | (Colombia) Samuel Alejandro Linde Palacios | (Colombia) Juan Sebastián Gómez (United States) Mwendwa Mbithi | (Colombia) Andrés Urrea (Chile) Diego Jarry Fillol (Argentina) Fernando Cavallo (United States) Ryan Dickerson |
| April 27 | Quito, Ecuador; Clay; M15; Singles and doubles draws | (Colombia) Juan Sebastián Gómez (Colombia) Andrés Urrea; 7–5, 6–1 | (Argentina) Fernando Cavallo (Argentina) Felipe de Dios | (Colombia) Juan Sebastián Gómez (United States) Mwendwa Mbithi | (Colombia) Andrés Urrea (Chile) Diego Jarry Fillol (Argentina) Fernando Cavallo (United States) Ryan Dickerson |

=== May ===
| Week of | Tournament | Winner | Runners-up | Semifinalists | Quarterfinalists |
|---|---|---|---|---|---|
| May 4 | Nakhon Pathom, Thailand; Hard; M25; Singles and doubles draws | (Australia) Moerani Bouzige; 6–7^{(5–7)}, 7–6^{(7–4)}, 7–6^{(7–2)} | (Japan) Takuya Kumasaka | (Malaysia) Mitsuki Wei Kang Leong (Australia) Matthew Dellavedova | (India) S D Prajwal Dev (Japan) Taiyo Yamanaka (Japan) Masamichi Imamura (Australia) Cruz Hewitt |
| May 4 | Nakhon Pathom, Thailand; Hard; M25; Singles and doubles draws | (Australia) Jesse Delaney (Japan) Yamato Sueoka; 7–5, 3–6, [10–7] | (Thailand) Kasidit Samrej (Thailand) Pawit Sornlaksup | (Malaysia) Mitsuki Wei Kang Leong (Australia) Matthew Dellavedova | (India) S D Prajwal Dev (Japan) Taiyo Yamanaka (Japan) Masamichi Imamura (Australia) Cruz Hewitt |
| May 4 | Nottingham, United Kingdom; Hard; M25; Singles and doubles draws | (United States) Braden Shick; 7–6^{(7–2)}, 6–4 | (United Kingdom) Anton Matusevich | (Greece) Dimitris Sakellaridis (United States) Miles Jones | (United Kingdom) Patrick Brady (United Kingdom) Millen Hurrion (Republic of Ireland) Conor Gannon (Bosnia and Herzegovina) Nemanja Malešević |
| May 4 | Nottingham, United Kingdom; Hard; M25; Singles and doubles draws | (United Kingdom) Tom Hands (United Kingdom) Finn Murgett; 6–3, 6–3 | (United Kingdom) James MacKinlay (United States) Karl Poling | (Greece) Dimitris Sakellaridis (United States) Miles Jones | (United Kingdom) Patrick Brady (United Kingdom) Millen Hurrion (Republic of Ireland) Conor Gannon (Bosnia and Herzegovina) Nemanja Malešević |
| May 4 | Loulé, Portugal; Hard; M25; Singles and doubles draws | (Portugal) Tiago Pereira; 6–4, 6–4 | (Portugal) João Domingues | (Portugal) Tiago Torres (Portugal) Gonçalo Marques | (Portugal) João Silva (Portugal) Francisco Rocha (Italy) Fausto Tabacco (Portugal) Diogo Marques |
| May 4 | Loulé, Portugal; Hard; M25; Singles and doubles draws | (Canada) Justin Boulais (Portugal) Tiago Pereira; 7–6^{(7–5)}, 6–7^{(3–7)}, [10–4] | (Australia) Thomas Fancutt (New Zealand) Ajeet Rai | (Portugal) Tiago Torres (Portugal) Gonçalo Marques | (Portugal) João Silva (Portugal) Francisco Rocha (Italy) Fausto Tabacco (Portugal) Diogo Marques |
| May 4 | Sabadell, Spain; Clay; M25; Singles and doubles draws | (Bulgaria) Iliyan Radulov; 7–6^{(7–4)}, 6–2 | (Spain) Oriol Roca Batalla | (Spain) Max Alcalá Gurri (Spain) Alejo Sánchez Quílez | (France) Daniel Jade (Spain) Imanol López Morillo (Spain) Àlex Martí Pujolràs (France) Geoffrey Blancaneaux |
| May 4 | Sabadell, Spain; Clay; M25; Singles and doubles draws | (Spain) Daniel Rincón (Spain) Oriol Roca Batalla; Walkover | (Spain) Alberto Barroso Campos (Spain) Iñaki Montes de la Torre | (Spain) Max Alcalá Gurri (Spain) Alejo Sánchez Quílez | (France) Daniel Jade (Spain) Imanol López Morillo (Spain) Àlex Martí Pujolràs (France) Geoffrey Blancaneaux |
| May 4 | Santa Margherita di Pula, Italy; Clay; M25; Singles and doubles draws | (Bulgaria) Petr Nesterov; 7–5, 6–0 | (France) Arthur Nagel | (Italy) Michele Mecarelli (Iran) Kasra Rahmani | Andrey Chepelev (Italy) Lorenzo Berto (Italy) Giacomo Crisostomo (Italy) Enrico Dalla Valle |
| May 4 | Santa Margherita di Pula, Italy; Clay; M25; Singles and doubles draws | (Poland) Piotr Matuszewski (Poland) Jan Werbliński; 6–4, 6–3 | (Italy) Alessandro Spadola (Italy) Matteo Vavassori | (Italy) Michele Mecarelli (Iran) Kasra Rahmani | Andrey Chepelev (Italy) Lorenzo Berto (Italy) Giacomo Crisostomo (Italy) Enrico Dalla Valle |
| May 4 | Villa María, Argentina; Clay; M25; Singles and doubles draws | (Argentina) Juan Bautista Torres; 6–2, 7–5 | (Argentina) Gonzalo Villanueva | (Argentina) Luciano Emanuel Ambrogi (Argentina) Juan Estévez | (Argentina) Máximo Zeitune (Chile) Nicolás Bruna (Colombia) Samuel Alejandro Linde Palacios (Colombia) Samuel Heredia |
| May 4 | Villa María, Argentina; Clay; M25; Singles and doubles draws | (Argentina) Juan Estévez (Argentina) Máximo Zeitune; 6–3, 6–3 | (Argentina) Julián Cúndom (Argentina) Mateo del Pino | (Argentina) Luciano Emanuel Ambrogi (Argentina) Juan Estévez | (Argentina) Máximo Zeitune (Chile) Nicolás Bruna (Colombia) Samuel Alejandro Linde Palacios (Colombia) Samuel Heredia |
| May 4 | Wuning, China; Hard; M15; Singles and doubles draws | (South Korea) Park Ui-sung; 6–2, 6–3 | (Japan) Taisei Ichikawa | (South Korea) Choe Jae-sung (China) Mo Yecong | (Japan) Yuta Kikuchi (China) Zhao Zhao (China) Liu Hanyi (Australia) Lachlan McFadzean |
| May 4 | Wuning, China; Hard; M15; Singles and doubles draws | (South Korea) Choe Jae-sung (South Korea) Park Ui-sung; 6–3, 6–3 | (Australia) Lachlan McFadzean (Australia) Ashton McLeod | (South Korea) Choe Jae-sung (China) Mo Yecong | (Japan) Yuta Kikuchi (China) Zhao Zhao (China) Liu Hanyi (Australia) Lachlan McFadzean |
| May 4 | Islamabad, Pakistan; Hard; M15; Singles and doubles draws | (Sweden) Arvid Nordquist; 7–5, 3–6, 7–6^{(7–3)} | (Pakistan) Muhammad Shoaib | (Italy) Edoardo Cherie Ligniere; Nikita Ianin | (Algeria) Samir Hamza Reguig (Turkey) Kerem Yılmaz (Kazakhstan) Grigoriy Lomakin (Turkey) Mert Naci Türker |
| May 4 | Islamabad, Pakistan; Hard; M15; Singles and doubles draws | Nikita Ianin; Andrei Kunitsyn; 6–0, 7–6^{(7–3)} | (Turkey) Melih Anavatan (Turkey) Mert Naci Türker | (Italy) Edoardo Cherie Ligniere; Nikita Ianin | (Algeria) Samir Hamza Reguig (Turkey) Kerem Yılmaz (Kazakhstan) Grigoriy Lomakin (Turkey) Mert Naci Türker |
| May 4 | Mbombela, South Africa; Hard; M15; Singles and doubles draws | (Belgium) Romain Faucon; 6–3, 7–5 | (South Africa) Alec Beckley | (United States) Lev Seidman (Costa Rica) Jesse Flores | (Monaco) Rocco Piatti (United Kingdom) James Beaven (South Africa) Marc van der Merwe (Germany) Tom Zeuch |
| May 4 | Mbombela, South Africa; Hard; M15; Singles and doubles draws | (United Kingdom) Stefan Cooper (Australia) Stefan Vujic; 5–7, 6–3, [10–8] | (India) Madhwin Kamath (India) Atharva Sharma | (United States) Lev Seidman (Costa Rica) Jesse Flores | (Monaco) Rocco Piatti (United Kingdom) James Beaven (South Africa) Marc van der Merwe (Germany) Tom Zeuch |
| May 4 | Hurghada, Egypt; Hard; M15; Singles and doubles draws | (Italy) Leonardo Rossi; 6–4, 6–0 | (Austria) Nico Hipfl | (Italy) Filippo Francesco Garbero (Germany) Nino Ehrenschneider | (Egypt) Karim Ibrahim (Spain) Jorge Plans; Ivan Gretskiy (Italy) Lorenzo Bocchi |
| May 4 | Hurghada, Egypt; Hard; M15; Singles and doubles draws | (Lebanon) Peter Alam (Germany) David Eichenseher; 6–3, 7–6^{(7–4)} | Ivan Gretskiy; Grigory Shebekin | (Italy) Filippo Francesco Garbero (Germany) Nino Ehrenschneider | (Egypt) Karim Ibrahim (Spain) Jorge Plans; Ivan Gretskiy (Italy) Lorenzo Bocchi |
| May 4 | Monastir, Tunisia; Hard; M15; Singles and doubles draws | (Australia) Jacob Bradshaw; 6–2, 7–6^{(7–4)} | (France) Maxime Chazal | (Algeria) Toufik Sahtali; Igor Kudriashov | (Germany) Luca Wiedenmann (Morocco) Amine Jamji (France) Maxence Bertimon (Italy) Giannicola Misasi |
| May 4 | Monastir, Tunisia; Hard; M15; Singles and doubles draws | (France) Maxence Bertimon (France) Mathieu Scaglia; 7–5, 6–4 | (Italy) Andrea Colombo (Italy) Giannicola Misasi | (Algeria) Toufik Sahtali; Igor Kudriashov | (Germany) Luca Wiedenmann (Morocco) Amine Jamji (France) Maxence Bertimon (Italy) Giannicola Misasi |
| May 4 | Vero Beach, United States; Clay; M15; Singles and doubles draws | (Brazil) Joaquim Almeida; 6–2, 1–6, 6–3 | (United States) Alex Rybakov | (United States) Liam Krall (United States) Quinn Vandecasteele | (United States) Ryan Colby (United States) Gavin Goode (United States) Tristan McCormick (United States) J.J. Wolf |
| May 4 | Vero Beach, United States; Clay; M15; Singles and doubles draws | (United States) Hunter Heck (United Kingdom) Oliver Okonkwo; 6–2, 6–2 | (United States) Preston Brown (Chile) Diego Jarry Fillol | (United States) Liam Krall (United States) Quinn Vandecasteele | (United States) Ryan Colby (United States) Gavin Goode (United States) Tristan McCormick (United States) J.J. Wolf |
| May 11 | Kutaisi, Georgia; Hard; M25; Singles and doubles draws | Semen Pankin; 7–6^{(9–7)}, 6–0 | (France) Cyril Vandermeersch | (Uzbekistan) Sergey Fomin (Ukraine) Vadym Ursu | (Italy) Alexandr Binda (Spain) John Echeverría (Georgia (country)) Saba Purtseladze (Armenia) Daniil Sarksian |
| May 11 | Kutaisi, Georgia; Hard; M25; Singles and doubles draws | (Uzbekistan) Denis Istomin (Uzbekistan) Maxim Shin; 6–4, 6–4 | Evgeny Philippov (Armenia) Daniil Sarksian | (Uzbekistan) Sergey Fomin (Ukraine) Vadym Ursu | (Italy) Alexandr Binda (Spain) John Echeverría (Georgia (country)) Saba Purtseladze (Armenia) Daniil Sarksian |
| May 11 | Vic, Spain; Clay; M25; Singles and doubles draws | (Spain) Daniel Rincón; 6–1, 3–6, 6–3 | (Spain) Sergi Pérez Contri | (United States) Jack Kennedy (Bulgaria) Iliyan Radulov | (Netherlands) Ryan Nijboer (Switzerland) Johan Nikles (Bulgaria) Ivan Ivanov (Spain) Oriol Roca Batalla |
| May 11 | Vic, Spain; Clay; M25; Singles and doubles draws | (United States) Keaton Hance (United States) Jack Kennedy; 6–4, 6–4 | (Spain) Ignasi Forcano (Netherlands) Mark Vervoort | (United States) Jack Kennedy (Bulgaria) Iliyan Radulov | (Netherlands) Ryan Nijboer (Switzerland) Johan Nikles (Bulgaria) Ivan Ivanov (Spain) Oriol Roca Batalla |
| May 11 | Reggio Emilia, Italy; Clay; M25; Singles and doubles draws | (Italy) Andrea Guerrieri; 7–6^{(7–2)}, 6–2 | (Italy) Gabriele Piraino | (Italy) Massimo Giunta (Italy) Manuel Mazza | (Italy) Samuele Pieri (Italy) Tommaso Compagnucci (Brazil) Guto Miguel (Italy) Federico Bondioli |
| May 11 | Reggio Emilia, Italy; Clay; M25; Singles and doubles draws | (Italy) Tommaso Compagnucci; Kirill Kivattsev; 7–5, 7–6^{(7–5)} | (Italy) Jacopo Bilardo (Italy) Massimo Giunta | (Italy) Massimo Giunta (Italy) Manuel Mazza | (Italy) Samuele Pieri (Italy) Tommaso Compagnucci (Brazil) Guto Miguel (Italy) Federico Bondioli |
| May 11 | Louny, Czech Republic; Clay; M25; Singles and doubles draws | (Romania) Filip Cristian Jianu; 3–6, 6–2, 6–4 | (France) Lilian Marmousez | (Czech Republic) Jakub Nicod (Ukraine) Georgii Kravchenko | (Czech Republic) Daniel Siniakov (Germany) Jeremy Schifris (France) Lucas Poullain (Czech Republic) Matyáš Černý |
| May 11 | Louny, Czech Republic; Clay; M25; Singles and doubles draws | (Slovakia) Michal Krajčí (Ukraine) Andriy Poritskyy; 1–6, 7–6^{(7–5)}, [10–5] | (Ukraine) Aleksandr Braynin (Ukraine) Georgii Kravchenko | (Czech Republic) Jakub Nicod (Ukraine) Georgii Kravchenko | (Czech Republic) Daniel Siniakov (Germany) Jeremy Schifris (France) Lucas Poullain (Czech Republic) Matyáš Černý |
| May 11 | Hurghada, Egypt; Hard; M25; Singles and doubles draws | (Egypt) Michael Bassem Sobhy; 6–3, 7–6^{(7–1)} | (Germany) Aaron Funk | (United Kingdom) Johannus Monday (Germany) David Eichenseher | (Algeria) Samir Hamza Reguig (Germany) Nino Ehrenschneider (Netherlands) Thijs Boogaard (Ukraine) Yurii Dzhavakian |
| May 11 | Hurghada, Egypt; Hard; M25; Singles and doubles draws | (Egypt) Michael Bassem Sobhy (Egypt) Fares Zakaria; 7–6^{(7–2)}, 6–2 | (Egypt) Amr Elsayed (Egypt) Karim Ibrahim | (United Kingdom) Johannus Monday (Germany) David Eichenseher | (Algeria) Samir Hamza Reguig (Germany) Nino Ehrenschneider (Netherlands) Thijs Boogaard (Ukraine) Yurii Dzhavakian |
| May 11 | Pensacola, United States; Clay; M25; Singles and doubles draws | (Dominican Republic) Nick Hardt; 2–6, 6–1, 6–3 | (United States) Ryan Colby | (United States) Adhithya Ganesan (United States) Ilyas Milad Fahim | (United States) Lucca Liu (United States) Christian Langmo (United States) Kaylan Bigun (Dominican Republic) Roberto Cid Subervi |
| May 11 | Pensacola, United States; Clay; M25; Singles and doubles draws | (United States) Bruno Kuzuhara (United States) Marko Mesarovic; 7–6^{(7–4)}, 1–6, [10–4] | (Romania) Vladislav Melnic (United Kingdom) Oliver Okonkwo | (United States) Adhithya Ganesan (United States) Ilyas Milad Fahim | (United States) Lucca Liu (United States) Christian Langmo (United States) Kaylan Bigun (Dominican Republic) Roberto Cid Subervi |
| May 11 | Andong, South Korea; Hard; M15; Singles and doubles draws | (Japan) Keisuke Saitoh; 6–4, 6–1 | (South Korea) Roh Ho-young | (South Korea) Chung Yun-seong (South Korea) Shin Woo-bin | (Japan) Sora Fukuda (Australia) Tai Sach (South Korea) Kim Geun-jun (South Korea) Shin San-hui |
| May 11 | Andong, South Korea; Hard; M15; Singles and doubles draws | (South Korea) Shin San-hui (South Korea) Sim Sung-been; 6–2, 6–4 | (South Korea) Chung Yun-seong (South Korea) Han Seon-yong | (South Korea) Chung Yun-seong (South Korea) Shin Woo-bin | (Japan) Sora Fukuda (Australia) Tai Sach (South Korea) Kim Geun-jun (South Korea) Shin San-hui |
| May 11 | Wuning, China; Hard; M15; Singles and doubles draws | (Australia) Jake Delaney; 7–5, 6–4 | (South Korea) Park Ui-sung | (China) Te Rigele (Japan) Yuta Tomida | (Japan) Kosuke Ogura (China) Mo Yecong (China) Zhang Boxiong (Japan) Yuta Kikuchi |
| May 11 | Wuning, China; Hard; M15; Singles and doubles draws | (Australia) Jake Delaney (Australia) Jesse Delaney; 6–2, 6–7^{(4–7)}, [10–7] | (South Korea) Choe Jae-sung (South Korea) Park Ui-sung | (China) Te Rigele (Japan) Yuta Tomida | (Japan) Kosuke Ogura (China) Mo Yecong (China) Zhang Boxiong (Japan) Yuta Kikuchi |
| May 11 | Nakhon Pathom, Thailand; Hard; M15; Singles and doubles draws | (New Zealand) Anton Shepp; 6–2, 6–1 | (Australia) Matthew Dellavedova | (Thailand) Kasidit Samrej (Thailand) Wishaya Trongcharoenchaikul | (Mexico) Alan Magadán (New Zealand) Isaac Becroft (Thailand) Tanakorn Srirat (South Korea) Chung Hyeon |
| May 11 | Nakhon Pathom, Thailand; Hard; M15; Singles and doubles draws | (New Zealand) Isaac Becroft (New Zealand) Anton Shepp; 7–6^{(7–5)}, 3–6, [10–7] | (Thailand) Thanapet Chanta (Thailand) Yuttana Charoenphon | (Thailand) Kasidit Samrej (Thailand) Wishaya Trongcharoenchaikul | (Mexico) Alan Magadán (New Zealand) Isaac Becroft (Thailand) Tanakorn Srirat (South Korea) Chung Hyeon |
| May 11 | Kuršumlijska Banja, Serbia; Clay; M15; Singles and doubles draws | (Germany) Max Wiskandt; 6–3, 6–0 | (Germany) Christian Djonov | (Bulgaria) Alexander Vasilev (Serbia) Simeon Stanković | Svyatoslav Gulin (Bulgaria) Yanaki Milev (Ukraine) Heorhii Shylov (Romania) Sebastian Gima |
| May 11 | Kuršumlijska Banja, Serbia; Clay; M15; Singles and doubles draws | (Spain) Pablo Aunion (Brazil) Thomas Miranda; 6–3, 6–3 | (Germany) Christian Djonov (Colombia) Daniel Salazar | (Bulgaria) Alexander Vasilev (Serbia) Simeon Stanković | Svyatoslav Gulin (Bulgaria) Yanaki Milev (Ukraine) Heorhii Shylov (Romania) Sebastian Gima |
| May 11 | Prijedor, Bosnia and Herzegovina; Clay; M15; Singles and doubles draws | (France) Felix Balshaw; 6–2, 6–1 | (Hungary) Attila Boros | (Germany) Yannik Kelm (Norway) Johan Oscar Lien | (Serbia) Dušan Obradović (Sweden) Nikola Slavic (Germany) Alen Mujakić (Ukraine) Nikita Mashtakov |
| May 11 | Prijedor, Bosnia and Herzegovina; Clay; M15; Singles and doubles draws | (France) Felix Balshaw (Greece) Dimitris Sakellaridis; 5–7, 6–4, [10–1] | (Sweden) Nikola Slavic (Bosnia and Herzegovina) Vladan Tadić | (Germany) Yannik Kelm (Norway) Johan Oscar Lien | (Serbia) Dušan Obradović (Sweden) Nikola Slavic (Germany) Alen Mujakić (Ukraine) Nikita Mashtakov |
| May 11 | Gaborone, Botswana; Hard; M15; Singles and doubles draws | (United States) Cooper Williams; 6–2, 6–2 | (France) Constantin Bittoun Kouzmine | (India) Udit Kamboj (Monaco) Rocco Piatti | (Latvia) Robert Strombachs (United States) James Weber (South Africa) Thando Longwe-Smit (Australia) Stefan Vujic |
| May 11 | Gaborone, Botswana; Hard; M15; Singles and doubles draws | (Australia) Ty Host (Australia) Stefan Vujic; 7–6^{(7–5)}, 6–4 | (Germany) Edison Ambarzumjan; Timofei Derepasko | (India) Udit Kamboj (Monaco) Rocco Piatti | (Latvia) Robert Strombachs (United States) James Weber (South Africa) Thando Longwe-Smit (Australia) Stefan Vujic |
| May 11 | Monastir, Tunisia; Hard; M15; Singles and doubles draws | (Senegal) Seydina André; 6–3, 6–4 | (France) Nicolas Jadoun | (France) Arthur Weber (Sweden) Jonas Eriksson Ziverts | (United Kingdom) Finn Murgett (France) Leo Raquillet (Italy) Giannicola Misasi (Sweden) John Hallquist Lithén |
| May 11 | Monastir, Tunisia; Hard; M15; Singles and doubles draws | (Netherlands) Daniel de Jonge (United Kingdom) Finn Murgett; 6–3, 6–2 | (France) César Bouchelaghem (France) Arthur Weber | (France) Arthur Weber (Sweden) Jonas Eriksson Ziverts | (United Kingdom) Finn Murgett (France) Leo Raquillet (Italy) Giannicola Misasi (Sweden) John Hallquist Lithén |
| May 11 | Maringá, Brazil; Clay; M15; Singles and doubles draws | (Brazil) Mateus Alves; 6–3, 6–3 | (Brazil) Luís Felipe Miguel | (Colombia) Salvador Price (Norway) Herman Hoeyeraal | (Argentina) Tomas Martinez (Argentina) Mateo del Pino (Chile) Nicolás Bruna (Brazil) Wilson Leite |
| May 11 | Maringá, Brazil; Clay; M15; Singles and doubles draws | (Norway) Herman Hoeyeraal (Canada) Jared Horwood; 6–3, 7–5 | (Brazil) Enzo Camargo Lima (Brazil) Gabriel Schenekenberg | (Colombia) Salvador Price (Norway) Herman Hoeyeraal | (Argentina) Tomas Martinez (Argentina) Mateo del Pino (Chile) Nicolás Bruna (Brazil) Wilson Leite |
| May 18 | Kutaisi, Georgia; Hard; M25; Singles and doubles draws | (Ukraine) Vadym Ursu; 6–1, 7–6^{(8–6)} | Daniil Ostapenkov | Semen Pankin (Sweden) Kevin Edengren | (Turkey) Yankı Erel (Italy) Alexandr Binda (Georgia (country)) Saba Purtseladze (France) Cyril Vandermeersch |
| May 18 | Kutaisi, Georgia; Hard; M25; Singles and doubles draws | (Cyprus) Eleftherios Neos; Semen Pankin; 6–3, 6–2 | (Sweden) Oliver Johansson (Poland) Piotr Pawlak | Semen Pankin (Sweden) Kevin Edengren | (Turkey) Yankı Erel (Italy) Alexandr Binda (Georgia (country)) Saba Purtseladze (France) Cyril Vandermeersch |
| May 18 | Mataró, Spain; Clay; M25; Singles and doubles draws | (Spain) Oriol Roca Batalla; 6–4, 6–3 | (Spain) Àlex Martí Pujolràs | (Switzerland) Johan Nikles (United States) Jack Kennedy | (Spain) Nicolás Álvarez Varona (Spain) Julian Alonso (Spain) Robert Watzka (United States) Keaton Hance |
| May 18 | Mataró, Spain; Clay; M25; Singles and doubles draws | Pavel Lagutin (Morocco) Younes Lalami; 6–3, 6–4 | (United States) Keaton Hance (United States) Jack Kennedy | (Switzerland) Johan Nikles (United States) Jack Kennedy | (Spain) Nicolás Álvarez Varona (Spain) Julian Alonso (Spain) Robert Watzka (United States) Keaton Hance |
| May 18 | Deauville, France; Clay; M25; Singles and doubles draws | (France) Felix Balshaw; 6–4, 6–1 | (France) Corentin Denolly | (France) Geoffrey Blancaneaux (France) Raphael Perot | (Netherlands) Alec Deckers (Belgium) Jack Logé (Netherlands) Sander Jong (Chile) Daniel Antonio Núñez |
| May 18 | Deauville, France; Clay; M25; Singles and doubles draws | (France) Felix Balshaw (France) Arthur Nagel; 6–4, 6–1 | (Belgium) Émilien Demanet (Belgium) Jack Logé | (France) Geoffrey Blancaneaux (France) Raphael Perot | (Netherlands) Alec Deckers (Belgium) Jack Logé (Netherlands) Sander Jong (Chile) Daniel Antonio Núñez |
| May 18 | Bol, Croatia; Clay; M25; Singles and doubles draws | (Poland) Maks Kaśnikowski; 6–1, 6–3 | (Croatia) Noa Vukadin | Andrey Chepelev (Ukraine) Nikita Mashtakov | (Portugal) Tiago Pereira (Italy) Fabrizio Andaloro (Serbia) Marko Miladinović (Slovenia) Filip Jeff Planinšek |
| May 18 | Bol, Croatia; Clay; M25; Singles and doubles draws | (Australia) Thomas Fancutt (New Zealand) Ajeet Rai; 7–6^{(7–3)}, 6–3 | (Croatia) Admir Kalender (Serbia) Matej Sabanov | Andrey Chepelev (Ukraine) Nikita Mashtakov | (Portugal) Tiago Pereira (Italy) Fabrizio Andaloro (Serbia) Marko Miladinović (Slovenia) Filip Jeff Planinšek |
| May 18 | Gimcheon, South Korea; Hard; M15; Singles and doubles draws | (South Korea) Shin San-hui; 6–2, 6–1 | (South Korea) Jang Yun-seok | (Australia) Tai Sach (South Korea) Kim Dong-ju | (South Korea) Chung Yun-seong (Japan) Sora Fukuda (Japan) Shinji Hazawa (Japan) Keisuke Saitoh |
| May 18 | Gimcheon, South Korea; Hard; M15; Singles and doubles draws | (South Korea) Oh Chan-yeong (South Korea) Roh Ho-young; 6–4, 6–2 | (South Korea) Chu Seok-hyeon (South Korea) Shin Woo-bin | (Australia) Tai Sach (South Korea) Kim Dong-ju | (South Korea) Chung Yun-seong (Japan) Sora Fukuda (Japan) Shinji Hazawa (Japan) Keisuke Saitoh |
| May 18 | Lu'an, China; Hard; M15; Singles and doubles draws | (Japan) Noritaka Koizumi; 6–2, 6–2 | (China) Sun Qian | (Japan) Kosuke Ogura (Australia) Jake Delaney | (China) Cui Jie (Japan) Yuta Tomida (Australia) Sam Ryan Ziegann (China) Zeng Yaojie |
| May 18 | Lu'an, China; Hard; M15; Singles and doubles draws | (Japan) Yuichiro Inui (Japan) Yuta Kikuchi; 4–6, 6–3, [10–8] | (China) Tang Sheng (China) Yang Zijiang | (Japan) Kosuke Ogura (Australia) Jake Delaney | (China) Cui Jie (Japan) Yuta Tomida (Australia) Sam Ryan Ziegann (China) Zeng Yaojie |
| May 18 | Klagenfurt, Austria; Clay; M15; Singles and doubles draws | (Italy) Samuele Pieri; 6–1, 6–2 | (Uzbekistan) Khumoyun Sultanov | (Czech Republic) Dominik Reček (Ukraine) Oleksii Krutykh | (Germany) Adrian Oetzbach (Germany) Calvin Müller (Argentina) Lucio Ratti (Greece) Dimitris Sakellaridis |
| May 18 | Klagenfurt, Austria; Clay; M15; Singles and doubles draws | (Switzerland) Luca Staeheli (Germany) Louis Wessels; 6–4, 6–3 | (Germany) Calvin Müller (Germany) Adrian Oetzbach | (Czech Republic) Dominik Reček (Ukraine) Oleksii Krutykh | (Germany) Adrian Oetzbach (Germany) Calvin Müller (Argentina) Lucio Ratti (Greece) Dimitris Sakellaridis |
| May 18 | Litija, Slovenia; Clay; M15; Singles and doubles draws | (Slovenia) Bor Artnak; 6–1, 6–1 | (Italy) Giuseppe La Vela | (Italy) Gabriele Bosio (Slovenia) Žiga Šeško | (Germany) Niklas Schell; Kirill Kivattsev (Italy) Andrea Fiorentini (United Kingdom) Jeremy Gschwendtner |
| May 18 | Litija, Slovenia; Clay; M15; Singles and doubles draws | (Italy) Marco Furlanetto (Switzerland) Nicolás Parizzia; 6–2, 6–2 | (Germany) Max Pade (United States) Michael Savano | (Italy) Gabriele Bosio (Slovenia) Žiga Šeško | (Germany) Niklas Schell; Kirill Kivattsev (Italy) Andrea Fiorentini (United Kingdom) Jeremy Gschwendtner |
| May 18 | Bucharest, Romania; Clay; M15; Singles and doubles draws | (Romania) Radu Mihai Papoe; 4–6, 7–5, 7–5 | (Romania) Ștefan Horia Haita | (Romania) Rareș Teodor Pieleanu (Romania) Sebastian Gima | (Romania) Robert Guna (Romania) Daniel Uță (Romania) Dragoș Nicolae Cazacu (Moldova) Ilya Snițari |
| May 18 | Bucharest, Romania; Clay; M15; Singles and doubles draws | (Romania) Matei Florin Breazu (Romania) Mihai Alexandru Coman; 2–6, 7–5, [10–3] | (Romania) Mihai David Haita (Romania) Ștefan Horia Haita | (Romania) Rareș Teodor Pieleanu (Romania) Sebastian Gima | (Romania) Robert Guna (Romania) Daniel Uță (Romania) Dragoș Nicolae Cazacu (Moldova) Ilya Snițari |
| May 18 | Kuršumlijska Banja, Serbia; Clay; M15; Singles and doubles draws | (Belgium) Martin van der Meerschen; 2–6, 6–3, 6–4 | (Argentina) Lorenzo Gagliardo | Svyatoslav Gulin (Serbia) Kristijan Juhas | (France) Alexandre Aubriot (Germany) Max Wiskandt (Serbia) Vlado Jankanj (Serbia) Stefan Popović |
| May 18 | Kuršumlijska Banja, Serbia; Clay; M15; Singles and doubles draws | (Serbia) Novak Novaković (Serbia) Tadija Radovanović; 7–6^{(8–6)}, 3–6, [10–7] | (Serbia) Kristijan Juhas (Serbia) Stefan Popović | Svyatoslav Gulin (Serbia) Kristijan Juhas | (France) Alexandre Aubriot (Germany) Max Wiskandt (Serbia) Vlado Jankanj (Serbia) Stefan Popović |
| May 18 | Doboj, Bosnia and Herzegovina; Clay; M15; Singles and doubles draws | (Ukraine) Eric Vanshelboim; 6–4, 3–6, 6–1 | (Serbia) Dušan Obradović | (Poland) Karol Filar (South Korea) Gerard Campaña Lee | (Hungary) Attila Boros (Bosnia and Herzegovina) Nemanja Malešević (Hungary) Péter Makk (Sweden) John Hallquist Lithén |
| May 18 | Doboj, Bosnia and Herzegovina; Clay; M15; Singles and doubles draws | (Denmark) Oskar Brostrøm Poulsen (Sweden) Nikola Slavic; 6–3, 7–6^{(7–5)} | (Serbia) Filip Djokić (Serbia) Dušan Milanović | (Poland) Karol Filar (South Korea) Gerard Campaña Lee | (Hungary) Attila Boros (Bosnia and Herzegovina) Nemanja Malešević (Hungary) Péter Makk (Sweden) John Hallquist Lithén |
| May 18 | Kayseri, Turkiye; Hard; M15; Singles and doubles draws | (Switzerland) Patrick Schoen; 7–5, 6–4 | (Belgium) Romain Faucon | (Turkey) Arda Azkara (Bulgaria) Dinko Dinev | (Algeria) Mohamed Ali Abibsi (Australia) Jacob Bradshaw (Bulgaria) Viktor Markov (Cyprus) Melios Efstathiou |
| May 18 | Kayseri, Turkiye; Hard; M15; Singles and doubles draws | (Turkey) Arda Azkara (Turkey) Haydar Cem Gökpınar; 6–3, 6–4 | Vardan Manukyan (Bulgaria) Viktor Markov | (Turkey) Arda Azkara (Bulgaria) Dinko Dinev | (Algeria) Mohamed Ali Abibsi (Australia) Jacob Bradshaw (Bulgaria) Viktor Markov (Cyprus) Melios Efstathiou |
| May 18 | Gaborone, Botswana; Hard; M15; Singles and doubles draws | (South Africa) Alec Beckley; 4–1 ret. | (United States) Cooper Williams | (Latvia) Robert Strombachs (France) Constantin Bittoun Kouzmine | (Australia) Ty Host; Timofei Derepasko (Burundi) Allan Gatoto (Australia) Jake Dembo |
| May 18 | Gaborone, Botswana; Hard; M15; Singles and doubles draws | (Germany) Edison Ambarzumjan; Timofei Derepasko; 6–3, 7–6^{(7–5)} | (Australia) Zaharije-Zak Talic (South Africa) Ethan Terblanche | (Latvia) Robert Strombachs (France) Constantin Bittoun Kouzmine | (Australia) Ty Host; Timofei Derepasko (Burundi) Allan Gatoto (Australia) Jake Dembo |
| May 18 | Hurghada, Egypt; Hard; M15; Singles and doubles draws | (Estonia) Markus Mölder; 6–1 ret. | (India) Pranav Karthik | (Algeria) Samir Hamza Reguig (India) Madhwin Kamath | (United Kingdom) Viktor Frydrych (Egypt) Karim Ibrahim (Egypt) Nour Fathalla (Italy) Felipe Virgili Berini |
| May 18 | Hurghada, Egypt; Hard; M15; Singles and doubles draws | (Algeria) Samir Hamza Reguig (Greece) Ioannis Kountourakis; 6–3, 6–4 | (India) Rishit Dakhane (Finland) Oskari Eerola | (Algeria) Samir Hamza Reguig (India) Madhwin Kamath | (United Kingdom) Viktor Frydrych (Egypt) Karim Ibrahim (Egypt) Nour Fathalla (Italy) Felipe Virgili Berini |
| May 18 | Monastir, Tunisia; Hard; M15; Singles and doubles draws | (Netherlands) Daniel de Jonge; 6–2, 6–4 | (France) Nicolas Tepmahc | (Italy) Fausto Tabacco (Senegal) Seydina André | (Spain) Izan Almazán Valiente (Algeria) Mohamed Nazim Makhlouf (Republic of Ireland) Conor Gannon (Spain) Alejandro Turriziani Álvarez |
| May 18 | Monastir, Tunisia; Hard; M15; Singles and doubles draws | (Republic of Ireland) Conor Gannon (Tunisia) Adam Nagoudi; 6–3, 6–4 | (United Kingdom) Matthew Rankin (France) Mathieu Scaglia | (Italy) Fausto Tabacco (Senegal) Seydina André | (Spain) Izan Almazán Valiente (Algeria) Mohamed Nazim Makhlouf (Republic of Ireland) Conor Gannon (Spain) Alejandro Turriziani Álvarez |
| May 18 | Maringá, Brazil; Clay; M15; Singles and doubles draws | (Brazil) Mateus Alves; 6–1, 6–4 | (Brazil) Gustavo Ribeiro de Almeida | (Norway) Herman Hoeyeraal (Argentina) Santiago Giamichelle | (Argentina) Ezequiel Monferrer (Argentina) Julián Cúndom (Brazil) Wilson Leite (Brazil) Kaua Lorenzo Santos Gava |
| May 18 | Maringá, Brazil; Clay; M15; Singles and doubles draws | (Brazil) Ryan Augusto dos Santos (Brazil) João Victor Couto Loureiro; 6–4, 4–6, [10–4] | (Argentina) Julián Cúndom (Argentina) Mateo Del Pino | (Norway) Herman Hoeyeraal (Argentina) Santiago Giamichelle | (Argentina) Ezequiel Monferrer (Argentina) Julián Cúndom (Brazil) Wilson Leite (Brazil) Kaua Lorenzo Santos Gava |
| May 25 | Carnac, France; Clay; M25; Singles and doubles draws | (France) Daniel Jade; 6–2, 6–2 | (France) Arthur Nagel | (France) Maxime Chazal (France) Hugo Car | (France) Alexandre Reco (France) Maé Malige (France) Raphael Perot (France) Mathys Domenc |
| May 25 | Carnac, France; Clay; M25; Singles and doubles draws | (Morocco) Younes Lalami (Germany) Marlon Vankan; 6–3, 6–2 | (France) Pierre Antoine Faut (France) Mickael Kaouk | (France) Maxime Chazal (France) Hugo Car | (France) Alexandre Reco (France) Maé Malige (France) Raphael Perot (France) Mathys Domenc |
| May 25 | Troisdorf, Germany; Clay; M25; Singles and doubles draws | (Germany) Max Schönhaus; 6–4, 6–3 | (Germany) Mika Petkovic | (Poland) Marcel Zieliński (Norway) Viktor Durasovic | (France) Matteo Martineau (Germany) Kai Wehnelt (Germany) Justin Schlageter (Germany) Marvin Möller |
| May 25 | Troisdorf, Germany; Clay; M25; Singles and doubles draws | (Germany) Max Schönhaus (Germany) Kai Wehnelt; 6–3, 6–4 | (Germany) Christoph Negritu (Germany) Adrian Oetzbach | (Poland) Marcel Zieliński (Norway) Viktor Durasovic | (France) Matteo Martineau (Germany) Kai Wehnelt (Germany) Justin Schlageter (Germany) Marvin Möller |
| May 25 | Grado, Italy; Clay; M25; Singles and doubles draws | (United Kingdom) Oliver Crawford; 7–6^{(9–7)}, 6–2 | (Italy) Gianmarco Ferrari | (Austria) Sebastian Sorger (Argentina) Lucio Ratti | (Italy) Matteo Sciahbasi (Czech Republic) Matthew William Donald (Italy) Giovanni Oradini (Italy) Pierluigi Basile |
| May 25 | Grado, Italy; Clay; M25; Singles and doubles draws | (Denmark) Oskar Brostrøm Poulsen (Sweden) Nikola Slavic; 4–6, 6–4, [11–9] | (Bulgaria) Yanaki Milev (Argentina) Lucio Ratti | (Austria) Sebastian Sorger (Argentina) Lucio Ratti | (Italy) Matteo Sciahbasi (Czech Republic) Matthew William Donald (Italy) Giovanni Oradini (Italy) Pierluigi Basile |
| May 25 | Bol, Croatia; Clay; M25; Singles and doubles draws | (Croatia) Noa Vukadin; 2–6, 7–5, 6–3 | (Croatia) Duje Ajduković | (Portugal) Tiago Pereira (Croatia) Mili Poljičak | (Poland) Alan Ważny (Serbia) Marko Maksimović; Andrey Chepelev (Australia) Duje Markovina |
| May 25 | Bol, Croatia; Clay; M25; Singles and doubles draws | (Croatia) Admir Kalender (Croatia) Mili Poljičak; 6–4, 6–3 | (Greece) Dimitris Sakellaridis (Greece) Michalis Sakellaridis | (Portugal) Tiago Pereira (Croatia) Mili Poljičak | (Poland) Alan Ważny (Serbia) Marko Maksimović; Andrey Chepelev (Australia) Duje Markovina |
| May 25 | Kuršumlijska Banja, Serbia; Clay; M25; Singles and doubles draws | (Bulgaria) Alexander Vasilev; 6–2, 4–6, 6–2 | Denis Klok | (Serbia) Simeon Stanković (Greece) Aristotelis Thanos | (Serbia) Kristijan Juhas (Serbia) Stefan Popović; Svyatoslav Gulin (Serbia) Vuk Radjenovic |
| May 25 | Kuršumlijska Banja, Serbia; Clay; M25; Singles and doubles draws | Anton Arzhankin (Canada) Benjamin Thomas George; 6–1, 7–5 | (Serbia) Stefan Popović (Bulgaria) Alexander Vasilev | (Serbia) Simeon Stanković (Greece) Aristotelis Thanos | (Serbia) Kristijan Juhas (Serbia) Stefan Popović; Svyatoslav Gulin (Serbia) Vuk Radjenovic |
| May 25 | Karuizawa, Japan; Clay; M15; Singles and doubles draws | (United States) Evan Zhu; 2–6, 6–4, 6–2 | (Australia) Jake Delaney | (Japan) Hiromasa Koyama (Japan) Sora Fukuda | (Japan) Hikaru Shiraishi (Japan) Leo Vithoontien (Japan) Shu Matsuoka (Japan) Koki Matsuda |
| May 25 | Karuizawa, Japan; Clay; M15; Singles and doubles draws | (Australia) Jesse Delaney (Northern Mariana Islands) Colin Sinclair; 7–6^{(8–6)}, 6–2 | (Japan) Yuta Tomida (Japan) Jumpei Yamasaki | (Japan) Hiromasa Koyama (Japan) Sora Fukuda | (Japan) Hikaru Shiraishi (Japan) Leo Vithoontien (Japan) Shu Matsuoka (Japan) Koki Matsuda |
| May 25 | Gimcheon, South Korea; Hard; M15; Singles and doubles draws | (Australia) Matthew Dellavedova; 6–2, 7–5 | (South Korea) Kim Dong-ju | (South Korea) Shin San-hui (Mexico) Alan Magadán | (South Korea) Jeong Yeon-su (United States) Hugo Hashimoto (Japan) Keisuke Saitoh (South Korea) Park Ui-sung |
| May 25 | Gimcheon, South Korea; Hard; M15; Singles and doubles draws | (South Korea) Jeong Yeon-su (South Korea) Kim Jang-jun; Walkover | (Japan) Yuto Oki (Japan) Keisuke Saitoh | (South Korea) Shin San-hui (Mexico) Alan Magadán | (South Korea) Jeong Yeon-su (United States) Hugo Hashimoto (Japan) Keisuke Saitoh (South Korea) Park Ui-sung |
| May 25 | Lu'an, China; Hard; M15; Singles and doubles draws | (China) Zhang Tianhui; 4–6, 7–5, 6–4 | (Chinese Taipei) Chen Yan-cheng | (China) Zeng Yaojie (Japan) Shintaro Imai | (China) Zhang Minghui (Japan) Shu Muto (Australia) Ashton McLeod (Australia) Lachlan McFadzean |
| May 25 | Lu'an, China; Hard; M15; Singles and doubles draws | (Chinese Taipei) Lin Nan-hsun (China) Yang Zijiang; 6–4, 2–6, [11–9] | (Chinese Taipei) Huang Tsung-hao (Chinese Taipei) Lu Chen-yu | (China) Zeng Yaojie (Japan) Shintaro Imai | (China) Zhang Minghui (Japan) Shu Muto (Australia) Ashton McLeod (Australia) Lachlan McFadzean |
| May 25 | Tsaghkadzor, Armenia; Clay; M15; Singles and doubles draws | (Poland) Fryderyk Lechno-Wasiutyński; 6–3, 2–6, 6–2 | (Italy) Gabriele Bosio | Grigory Shebekin (Italy) Alexandr Binda | Petr Bar Biryukov (Italy) Lorenzo Bocchi; Ivan Iutkin (Poland) Kacper Szymkowiak |
| May 25 | Tsaghkadzor, Armenia; Clay; M15; Singles and doubles draws | (Italy) Lorenzo Bocchi (Italy) Gabriele Bosio; 3–6, 6–2, [10–6] | Dmitrii Burtsev; Roman Valetov | Grigory Shebekin (Italy) Alexandr Binda | Petr Bar Biryukov (Italy) Lorenzo Bocchi; Ivan Iutkin (Poland) Kacper Szymkowiak |
| May 25 | Kutaisi, Georgia; Hard; M15; Singles and doubles draws | (Turkey) Yankı Erel; 6–1, 6–4 | (Ukraine) Vadym Ursu | Daniil Ostapenkov (Italy) Leonardo Rossi | (Uzbekistan) Maxim Shin (France) Robin Catry (Georgia (country)) Aleksandre Shvangiradze (France) Matisse Bobichon |
| May 25 | Kutaisi, Georgia; Hard; M15; Singles and doubles draws | Kirill Mishkin; Daniil Ostapenkov; 7–6^{(7–5)}, 6–7^{(4–7)}, [10–7] | (Armenia) Daniil Sarksian (Uzbekistan) Maxim Shin | Daniil Ostapenkov (Italy) Leonardo Rossi | (Uzbekistan) Maxim Shin (France) Robin Catry (Georgia (country)) Aleksandre Shvangiradze (France) Matisse Bobichon |
| May 25 | Kranjska Gora, Slovenia; Clay; M15; Singles and doubles draws | (Uzbekistan) Khumoyun Sultanov; 6–0, 7–5 | (Spain) Tito Chávez | (Germany) Maximilian Homberg (Germany) Calvin Müller | (Slovenia) Bor Artnak (Italy) Alexander Weis (Switzerland) Luca Staeheli (Italy) Giuseppe La Vela |
| May 25 | Kranjska Gora, Slovenia; Clay; M15; Singles and doubles draws | (Germany) Maximilian Homberg (Germany) Calvin Müller; Walkover | (Italy) Alessandro Bellifemine (Slovenia) Tilen Kovac | (Germany) Maximilian Homberg (Germany) Calvin Müller | (Slovenia) Bor Artnak (Italy) Alexander Weis (Switzerland) Luca Staeheli (Italy) Giuseppe La Vela |
| May 25 | Brčko, Bosnia and Herzegovina; Clay; M15; Singles and doubles draws | (Croatia) Josip Šimundža; 7–6^{(7–1)}, 3–6, 6–3 | (Hungary) Matyas Fuele | (Serbia) Dušan Obradović (Switzerland) Nikola Djosic | (Germany) Alen Mujakić (France) Amaury Raynel (South Korea) Gerard Campaña Lee (Spain) Valentín González-Galiño |
| May 25 | Brčko, Bosnia and Herzegovina; Clay; M15; Singles and doubles draws | (Italy) Jacopo Bilardo (Italy) Luigi Valletta; 6–1, 6–1 | (Serbia) Filip Djokić (Serbia) Dušan Milanović | (Serbia) Dušan Obradović (Switzerland) Nikola Djosic | (Germany) Alen Mujakić (France) Amaury Raynel (South Korea) Gerard Campaña Lee (Spain) Valentín González-Galiño |
| May 25 | Kayseri, Turkiye; Hard; M15; Singles and doubles draws | (Switzerland) Patrick Schoen; 6–1, 6–3 | (Spain) Pablo Perez Ramos | Vardan Manukyan (Belgium) Romain Faucon | (United Kingdom) Stefan Cooper (Bulgaria) Dinko Dinev (Saudi Arabia) Ammar Alhogbani (Belgium) Lars Goran Verwerft |
| May 25 | Kayseri, Turkiye; Hard; M15; Singles and doubles draws | (United Kingdom) Henry Jefferson (Spain) Pablo Perez Ramos; 6–3, 6–4 | (United States) Jeffrey Fradkin (United States) Maxwell McKennon | Vardan Manukyan (Belgium) Romain Faucon | (United Kingdom) Stefan Cooper (Bulgaria) Dinko Dinev (Saudi Arabia) Ammar Alhogbani (Belgium) Lars Goran Verwerft |
| May 25 | Monastir, Tunisia; Hard; M15; Singles and doubles draws | (Morocco) Yassine Dlimi; 6–4, 6–2 | (Algeria) Toufik Sahtali | (Spain) Izan Almazán Valiente (France) Nicolas Tepmahc | (Tunisia) Aziz Dougaz (France) Loan Lestir (Italy) Fausto Tabacco (Japan) Ryuki Matsuda |
| May 25 | Monastir, Tunisia; Hard; M15; Singles and doubles draws | (United Kingdom) Hugo Coquelin (Italy) Gabriele Vulpitta; 6–4, 7–5 | (France) Valentin de Carvalho (France) Mathieu Scaglia | (Spain) Izan Almazán Valiente (France) Nicolas Tepmahc | (Tunisia) Aziz Dougaz (France) Loan Lestir (Italy) Fausto Tabacco (Japan) Ryuki Matsuda |
| May 25 | Lakewood, United States; Hard; M15; Singles and doubles draws | (United States) Kaylan Bigun; 4–6, 6–4, 6–3 | (Israel) Amit Vales | (France) Lucas Marionneau (United States) Spencer Johnson | (Estonia) Oliver Ojakäär (United States) Noah Zamora (Czech Republic) Vít Kalina (United States) Theodore Dean |
| May 25 | Lakewood, United States; Hard; M15; Singles and doubles draws | (United States) Sebastian Gorzny (France) Lucas Marionneau; 7–6^{(7–5)}, 7–6^{(7–4)} | (New Zealand) Reece Falck (New Zealand) Matthew Shearer | (France) Lucas Marionneau (United States) Spencer Johnson | (Estonia) Oliver Ojakäär (United States) Noah Zamora (Czech Republic) Vít Kalina (United States) Theodore Dean |

=== June ===
| Week of | Tournament | Winner | Runners-up | Semifinalists | Quarterfinalists |
|---|---|---|---|---|---|
| June 1 | Caltanissetta, Italy; Clay; M25; Singles and doubles draws | (Italy) Massimo Giunta; 6–1, 6–4 | (Italy) Luca Potenza | (France) Alexandre Reco (Italy) Gabriele Piraino | (Italy) Giorgio Tabacco (Italy) Juan Cruz Martin Manzano (France) Maé Malige (Spain) Rafael Izquierdo Luque |
| June 1 | Caltanissetta, Italy; Clay; M25; Singles and doubles draws | (Australia) Thomas Fancutt (New Zealand) Ajeet Rai; 7–6^{(7–4)}, 6–1 | (Italy) Alessandro Coccioli (Italy) Lorenzo Lorusso | (France) Alexandre Reco (Italy) Gabriele Piraino | (Italy) Giorgio Tabacco (Italy) Juan Cruz Martin Manzano (France) Maé Malige (Spain) Rafael Izquierdo Luque |
| June 1 | Bistrița, Romania; Clay; M25; Singles and doubles draws | (Romania) Radu Mihai Papoe; 6–2, 7–6^{(7–5)} | (Romania) Ștefan Horia Haita | Kirill Kivattsev (Romania) Robert Guna | (Spain) Pablo Perez Navarro (Romania) Stefan Ilie Bogdan Petre (Romania) Radu David Țurcanu (Argentina) Franco Ribero |
| June 1 | Bistrița, Romania; Clay; M25; Singles and doubles draws | (Romania) Ștefan Horia Haita (Romania) Radu David Țurcanu; 6–3, 7–6^{(7–3)} | (Romania) Gabriel Ghețu (Romania) Robert Guna | Kirill Kivattsev (Romania) Robert Guna | (Spain) Pablo Perez Navarro (Romania) Stefan Ilie Bogdan Petre (Romania) Radu David Țurcanu (Argentina) Franco Ribero |
| June 1 | Cuiabá, Brazil; Clay; M25; Singles and doubles draws | (Dominican Republic) Nick Hardt; 6–2, 6–2 | (Argentina) Carlos María Zárate | (Brazil) Nicolas Oliveira (Argentina) Gonzalo Villanueva | (Argentina) Juan Manuel La Serna (Brazil) Gustavo Ribeiro de Almeida (Brazil) Mateus Alves (Brazil) Matheus Pucinelli de Almeida |
| June 1 | Cuiabá, Brazil; Clay; M25; Singles and doubles draws | (Brazil) Gustavo Ribeiro de Almeida (Brazil) Pedro Rodrigues; 2–6, 7–6^{(7–2)}, [10–4] | (Brazil) Enzo Kohlmann de Freitas (Brazil) Victor Pagotto | (Brazil) Nicolas Oliveira (Argentina) Gonzalo Villanueva | (Argentina) Juan Manuel La Serna (Brazil) Gustavo Ribeiro de Almeida (Brazil) Mateus Alves (Brazil) Matheus Pucinelli de Almeida |
| June 1 | Lu'an, China; Hard; M15; Singles and doubles draws | (Australia) Matthew Dellavedova; 6–1, 6–2 | (China) Liu Hanyi | (China) Mo Yecong (China) Zeng Yaojie | (China) Meng Fanming (Malaysia) Imran Daniel Abdul Hazli (Kazakhstan) Grigoriy Lomakin (Chinese Taipei) Huang Tsung-hao |
| June 1 | Lu'an, China; Hard; M15; Singles and doubles draws | (China) Jin Yuquan (China) Sun Qian; 4–6, 6–3, [10–5] | (China) Liu Shaoyun (China) Yang Zijiang | (China) Mo Yecong (China) Zeng Yaojie | (China) Meng Fanming (Malaysia) Imran Daniel Abdul Hazli (Kazakhstan) Grigoriy Lomakin (Chinese Taipei) Huang Tsung-hao |
| June 1 | Tsaghkadzor, Armenia; Clay; M15; Singles and doubles draws | (Italy) Lorenzo Bocchi; 6–3, 6–3 | Ruslan Tiukaev | (Poland) Kacper Knitter (Armenia) Daniil Sarksian | Petr Bar Biryukov (Poland) Adam Majchrzak (Hungary) Attila Boros; Grigory Shebekin |
| June 1 | Tsaghkadzor, Armenia; Clay; M15; Singles and doubles draws | Egor Agafonov; Aleksandr Lobanov; 1–0 ret. | (Poland) Kacper Knitter (Poland) Jan Wygona | (Poland) Kacper Knitter (Armenia) Daniil Sarksian | Petr Bar Biryukov (Poland) Adam Majchrzak (Hungary) Attila Boros; Grigory Shebekin |
| June 1 | Rosbach, Germany; Clay; M15; Singles and doubles draws | (Germany) Niels McDonald; 6–7^{(2–7)}, 6–3, 6–4 | (Germany) Kai Wehnelt | (Netherlands) Fons van Sambeek (Germany) Vincent Marysko | (Germany) Taym Al Azmeh (Poland) Marcel Zieliński (Germany) Michel Hopp (Germany) Julien Penzlin |
| June 1 | Rosbach, Germany; Clay; M15; Singles and doubles draws | (Germany) Taym Al Azmeh (Germany) Kai Wehnelt; 6–4, 6–4 | (Germany) Jannik Opitz (Germany) Louis Wessels | (Netherlands) Fons van Sambeek (Germany) Vincent Marysko | (Germany) Taym Al Azmeh (Poland) Marcel Zieliński (Germany) Michel Hopp (Germany) Julien Penzlin |
| June 1 | Ljubljana, Slovenia; Clay; M15; Singles and doubles draws | (Switzerland) Dylan Dietrich; 4–6, 6–2, 6–2 | (Slovenia) Jan Kupčič | (Bulgaria) Yanaki Milev (Slovenia) Aljaz Jeran | (Germany) Calvin Müller (Slovenia) Vid Mohar (Italy) Alexander Weis (Slovenia) Luka Talan Lopatić |
| June 1 | Ljubljana, Slovenia; Clay; M15; Singles and doubles draws | (Germany) Calvin Müller (Germany) Niklas Schell; 6–2, 6–2 | (Slovenia) Matic Hribar (Slovenia) Vid Mohar | (Bulgaria) Yanaki Milev (Slovenia) Aljaz Jeran | (Germany) Calvin Müller (Slovenia) Vid Mohar (Italy) Alexander Weis (Slovenia) Luka Talan Lopatić |
| June 1 | Szentendre, Hungary; Clay; M15; Singles and doubles draws | (Germany) Yannik Kelm; 6–4, 6–0 | (Hungary) Péter Makk | (Ukraine) Vladyslav Orlov (Italy) Lorenzo Angelini | (Greece) Dimitris Sakellaridis (Colombia) Daniel Salazar (Hungary) Péter Fajta (Italy) Giannicola Misasi |
| June 1 | Szentendre, Hungary; Clay; M15; Singles and doubles draws | (Hungary) David Bakonyi (Hungary) Adam Jilly; 6–0, 6–3 | (Czech Republic) Jan Hrazdil (Ukraine) Andriy Poritskyy | (Ukraine) Vladyslav Orlov (Italy) Lorenzo Angelini | (Greece) Dimitris Sakellaridis (Colombia) Daniel Salazar (Hungary) Péter Fajta (Italy) Giannicola Misasi |
| June 1 | Kuršumlijska Banja, Serbia; Clay; M15; Singles and doubles draws | (France) Sean Cuenin; 6–1, 6–0 | Anton Arzhankin | (Iran) Ali Yazdani (Argentina) Lorenzo Gagliardo | Denis Klok (Serbia) Aleksa Pisarić (Italy) William Mirarchi (Spain) Sergi Fita Juan |
| June 1 | Kuršumlijska Banja, Serbia; Clay; M15; Singles and doubles draws | (Italy) Matteo Liusso (Italy) Samuel Vincent Ruggeri; 7–6^{(7–5)}, 3–6, [10–6] | (Spain) Carles Córdoba (Spain) Sergio Planella Hernández | (Iran) Ali Yazdani (Argentina) Lorenzo Gagliardo | Denis Klok (Serbia) Aleksa Pisarić (Italy) William Mirarchi (Spain) Sergi Fita Juan |
| June 1 | Kayseri, Turkiye; Hard; M15; Singles and doubles draws | (Greece) Dimitris Azoidis; 6–7^{(5–7)}, 6–3, 6–3 | (Turkey) Mert Naci Türker | (Spain) Iván Marrero Curbelo (United States) Maxwell McKennon | (Turkey) Bora Şengül (United States) Adhithya Ganesan (Belgium) Romain Faucon (Bermuda) Daniel Phillips |
| June 1 | Kayseri, Turkiye; Hard; M15; Singles and doubles draws | (Turkey) S Mert Özdemir (Turkey) Mert Naci Türker; 5–7, 6–4, [14–12] | (United States) Jeffrey Fradkin (United States) Maxwell McKennon | (Spain) Iván Marrero Curbelo (United States) Maxwell McKennon | (Turkey) Bora Şengül (United States) Adhithya Ganesan (Belgium) Romain Faucon (Bermuda) Daniel Phillips |
| June 1 | Monastir, Tunisia; Hard; M15; Singles and doubles draws | (Morocco) Yassine Dlimi; 4–6, 6–4, 6–3 | (Australia) Jacob Bradshaw | (United States) Benjamin Willwerth (Spain) Alberto Barroso Campos | (Algeria) Mohamed Nazim Makhlouf (Tunisia) Aziz Ouakaa (Portugal) Rodrigo Fernandes (Algeria) Toufik Sahtali |
| June 1 | Monastir, Tunisia; Hard; M15; Singles and doubles draws | (United Kingdom) Matthew Rankin (United Kingdom) Marcus Walters; 6–4, 6–3 | (Tunisia) Anas Bennour Dit Sahli (Tunisia) Rayen Hermassi | (United States) Benjamin Willwerth (Spain) Alberto Barroso Campos | (Algeria) Mohamed Nazim Makhlouf (Tunisia) Aziz Ouakaa (Portugal) Rodrigo Fernandes (Algeria) Toufik Sahtali |
| June 1 | Lakewood, United States; Hard; M15; Singles and doubles draws | (United Kingdom) Oliver Bonding; 7–5, 7–6^{(7–1)} | (Estonia) Oliver Ojakäär | (Kazakhstan) Dmitry Popko (Finland) Iiro Vasa | (United States) Marko Mesarovic (Germany) Neo Niedner (United States) Ozan Baris (Japan) Kenta Miyoshi |
| June 1 | Lakewood, United States; Hard; M15; Singles and doubles draws | (Canada) Mikael Arseneault (Canada) Volodymyr Gurenko; 6–3, 5–7, [10–8] | (New Zealand) Reece Falck (New Zealand) Matthew Shearer | (Kazakhstan) Dmitry Popko (Finland) Iiro Vasa | (United States) Marko Mesarovic (Germany) Neo Niedner (United States) Ozan Baris (Japan) Kenta Miyoshi |
| June 1 | Harmon, Guam; Hard; M15; Singles and doubles draws | (Australia) Jake Delaney; 6–3, 4–6, 6–3 | (Morocco) Youssef Kadiri Hassani | (Australia) Tai Sach (Japan) Hiromasa Koyama | (Australia) Jesse Delaney (South Korea) Kim Geun-jun (Japan) Yusuke Kusuhara (Northern Mariana Islands) Colin Sinclair |
| June 1 | Harmon, Guam; Hard; M15; Singles and doubles draws | (Japan) Yusuke Kusuhara (Japan) Shunsuke Nakagawa; 6–4, 6–4 | (Australia) Jesse Delaney (Australia) Tai Sach | (Australia) Tai Sach (Japan) Hiromasa Koyama | (Australia) Jesse Delaney (South Korea) Kim Geun-jun (Japan) Yusuke Kusuhara (Northern Mariana Islands) Colin Sinclair |
| June 8 | Martos, Spain; Hard; M25; Singles and doubles draws | (Spain) Pablo Martínez Gómez; 7–6^{(7–5)}, 6–4 | (Portugal) João Domingues | (Spain) Rafael Izquierdo Luque (Spain) Pablo Perez Ramos | (France) Dan Added (United Kingdom) Emile Hudd (Spain) John Echeverría (Spain) Alberto Barroso Campos |
| June 8 | Martos, Spain; Hard; M25; Singles and doubles draws | (Chinese Taipei) Jeffrey Hsu (United States) Michael Zhu; 7–6^{(7–4)}, 7–6^{(7–3)} | (Spain) Pablo Perez Ramos (Republic of Ireland) Michael Wright | (Spain) Rafael Izquierdo Luque (Spain) Pablo Perez Ramos | (France) Dan Added (United Kingdom) Emile Hudd (Spain) John Echeverría (Spain) Alberto Barroso Campos |
| June 8 | Värnamo, Sweden; Clay; M25; Singles and doubles draws | (Germany) Niels McDonald; 7–6^{(7–5)}, 6–4 | (Austria) Sandro Kopp | (Greece) Aristotelis Thanos (Switzerland) Henry Bernet | (Belgium) Gilles-Arnaud Bailly (New Zealand) Anton Shepp (Germany) Noah Schlagenhauf (Germany) Max Wiskandt |
| June 8 | Värnamo, Sweden; Clay; M25; Singles and doubles draws | (Germany) Jannik Opitz (Germany) Louis Wessels; 6–4, 6–1 | (Germany) Adrian Oetzbach (Denmark) Oskar Brostrøm Poulsen | (Greece) Aristotelis Thanos (Switzerland) Henry Bernet | (Belgium) Gilles-Arnaud Bailly (New Zealand) Anton Shepp (Germany) Noah Schlagenhauf (Germany) Max Wiskandt |
| June 8 | Česká Lípa, Czechia; Clay; M25; Singles and doubles draws | (Ukraine) Oleksii Krutykh; 6–2, 6–4 | (Ukraine) Georgii Kravchenko | (Czech Republic) Denis Peták (Czech Republic) Jan Kumstát | (Brazil) Pedro Sakamoto (Brazil) Daniel Dutra da Silva (Germany) Rudolf Molleker (Germany) Marvin Möller |
| June 8 | Česká Lípa, Czechia; Clay; M25; Singles and doubles draws | (Czech Republic) Dominik Reček (Czech Republic) Daniel Siniakov; Walkover | (Brazil) Daniel Dutra da Silva (Brazil) Pedro Sakamoto | (Czech Republic) Denis Peták (Czech Republic) Jan Kumstát | (Brazil) Pedro Sakamoto (Brazil) Daniel Dutra da Silva (Germany) Rudolf Molleker (Germany) Marvin Möller |
| June 8 | Kiseljak, Bosnia and Herzegovina; Clay; M25; Singles and doubles draws | Andrey Chepelev; 6–3, 6–2 | (Spain) Sergi Pérez Contri | Marat Sharipov (Ukraine) Vladyslav Orlov | Yaroslav Demin; Kirill Kivattsev (Ukraine) Viacheslav Bielinskyi (Bosnia and Herzegovina) Ivan Biletić |
| June 8 | Kiseljak, Bosnia and Herzegovina; Clay; M25; Singles and doubles draws | (France) Yanis Ghazouani Durand (Morocco) Younes Lalami; 7–5, 6–3 | (Bulgaria) Alex Ganchev (Luxembourg) Sacha Maes | Marat Sharipov (Ukraine) Vladyslav Orlov | Yaroslav Demin; Kirill Kivattsev (Ukraine) Viacheslav Bielinskyi (Bosnia and Herzegovina) Ivan Biletić |
| June 8 | Wichita, United States; Hard; M25; Singles and doubles draws | (United States) Ozan Baris; 7–6^{(7–5)}, 6–4 | (United States) Sebastian Gorzny | (Australia) Enzo Aguiard (United States) Andrew Fenty | (Japan) Kenta Miyoshi (Kazakhstan) Dmitry Popko (Canada) Duncan Chan (France) Lucas Marionneau |
| June 8 | Wichita, United States; Hard; M25; Singles and doubles draws | (United States) Ozan Baris (New Zealand) Matthew Shearer; 6–7^{(8–10)}, 7–6^{(7–2)}, [10–7] | (Australia) Charlie Camus (Australia) Pavle Marinkov | (Australia) Enzo Aguiard (United States) Andrew Fenty | (Japan) Kenta Miyoshi (Kazakhstan) Dmitry Popko (Canada) Duncan Chan (France) Lucas Marionneau |
| June 8 | Tokyo, Japan; Hard; M15; Singles and doubles draws | (South Korea) Kim Jang-jun; 6–2, 6–3 | (Japan) Naoya Honda | (Mexico) Alan Magadán (Japan) Hikaru Shiraishi | (Japan) Taisei Ichikawa (Australia) Jake Delaney (Japan) Kosuke Ogura (Japan) Jumpei Yamasaki |
| June 8 | Tokyo, Japan; Hard; M15; Singles and doubles draws | (United States) Hunter Heck (Mexico) Alan Magadán; 6–3, 6–2 | (Australia) Jake Delaney (Japan) Yusuke Kusuhara | (Mexico) Alan Magadán (Japan) Hikaru Shiraishi | (Japan) Taisei Ichikawa (Australia) Jake Delaney (Japan) Kosuke Ogura (Japan) Jumpei Yamasaki |
| June 8 | Ma'anshan, China; Hard (i); M15; Singles and doubles draws | (Australia) Matthew Dellavedova; 6–2, 6–4 | (Thailand) Pawit Sornlaksup | (Japan) Kokoro Isomura (South Korea) Oh Chan-yeong | (Thailand) Thanapet Chanta (China) Liu Hanyi (South Korea) Kim Dong-ju (South Korea) Park Ui-sung |
| June 8 | Ma'anshan, China; Hard (i); M15; Singles and doubles draws | (Australia) Joshua Charlton (China) Wang Aoran; 6–3, 6–4 | (China) Jin Yuquan (China) Sun Qian | (Japan) Kokoro Isomura (South Korea) Oh Chan-yeong | (Thailand) Thanapet Chanta (China) Liu Hanyi (South Korea) Kim Dong-ju (South Korea) Park Ui-sung |
| June 8 | Messina, Italy; Clay; M15; Singles and doubles draws | (Italy) Fausto Tabacco; 6–4, 6–4 | (Italy) Gabriele Piraino | (Poland) Marcel Zieliński (France) Maxence Rivet | (Italy) Jacopo Bilardo (Italy) Gian Marco Ortenzi (Italy) Matteo Sciahbasi (Denmark) Christian Sigsgaard |
| June 8 | Messina, Italy; Clay; M15; Singles and doubles draws | (Italy) Jacopo Bilardo (Italy) Niccolò Ciavarella; 7–6^{(7–4)}, 7–5 | (Italy) Giulio Perego (Italy) Matteo Sciahbasi | (Poland) Marcel Zieliński (France) Maxence Rivet | (Italy) Jacopo Bilardo (Italy) Gian Marco Ortenzi (Italy) Matteo Sciahbasi (Denmark) Christian Sigsgaard |
| June 8 | Vaasa, Finland; Hard; M15; Singles and doubles draws | (France) Guillaume Dalmasso; 6–1, 6–4 | (Nicaragua) Joaquín Guilleme | (Poland) Filip Peliwo (Italy) Leonardo Rossi | (France) Matt Ponchet (Germany) Tom Zeuch (Finland) Linus Lagerbohm (Germany) Moritz Kudernatsch |
| June 8 | Vaasa, Finland; Hard; M15; Singles and doubles draws | (Estonia) Markus Mölder (Estonia) Kristjan Tamm; 6–4, 4–6, [10–6] | (Finland) Vesa Ahti (Germany) Tom Zeuch | (Poland) Filip Peliwo (Italy) Leonardo Rossi | (France) Matt Ponchet (Germany) Tom Zeuch (Finland) Linus Lagerbohm (Germany) Moritz Kudernatsch |
| June 8 | Nyíregyháza, Hungary; Clay; M15; Singles and doubles draws | (Germany) Yannik Kelm; 6–2, 6–4 | (Hungary) Attila Boros | (Spain) Oscar José Gutierrez (Germany) John Sperle | (Hungary) Patrik Meszaros (Hungary) Péter Makk (Uzbekistan) Nikita Belozertsev (Italy) Pietro Fellin |
| June 8 | Nyíregyháza, Hungary; Clay; M15; Singles and doubles draws | (Hungary) Kristof Kincses (Hungary) Botond Nagy; 6–4, 3–6, [10–6] | (Hungary) Gábor Hornung (Hungary) Botond Kisantal | (Spain) Oscar José Gutierrez (Germany) John Sperle | (Hungary) Patrik Meszaros (Hungary) Péter Makk (Uzbekistan) Nikita Belozertsev (Italy) Pietro Fellin |
| June 8 | Curtea de Argeș, Romania; Clay; M15; Singles and doubles draws | (Romania) Radu Mihai Papoe; 6–4, 6–2 | (Bulgaria) Anas Mazdrashki | (Mexico) Alan Fernando Rubio Fierros (Romania) Ștefan Adrian Andreescu | (Germany) Marlon Vankan (Lebanon) Fadi Bidan (Romania) Ștefan Horia Haita (Romania) Sebastian Gima |
| June 8 | Curtea de Argeș, Romania; Clay; M15; Singles and doubles draws | (Romania) Ștefan Horia Haita (Romania) Radu David Țurcanu; 7–6^{(7–4)}, 6–2 | (Italy) Vito Dell'Elba (Mexico) Alan Fernando Rubio Fierros | (Mexico) Alan Fernando Rubio Fierros (Romania) Ștefan Adrian Andreescu | (Germany) Marlon Vankan (Lebanon) Fadi Bidan (Romania) Ștefan Horia Haita (Romania) Sebastian Gima |
| June 8 | Kuršumlijska Banja, Serbia; Clay; M15; Singles and doubles draws | (France) Sean Cuenin; 7–6^{(7–2)}, 6–2 | (Italy) Stefano D'Agostino | (Serbia) Branko Đurić (Spain) Carles Córdoba | (Ukraine) Nikita Mashtakov (France) Nicolas Jadoun (Serbia) Marko Maksimović (Spain) Carlos Giraldi |
| June 8 | Kuršumlijska Banja, Serbia; Clay; M15; Singles and doubles draws | (Serbia) Nikola Jović (Ukraine) Nikita Mashtakov; 4–6, 6–3, [13–11] | (United States) Rajat Shirur (Australia) Brandon Walkin | (Serbia) Branko Đurić (Spain) Carles Córdoba | (Ukraine) Nikita Mashtakov (France) Nicolas Jadoun (Serbia) Marko Maksimović (Spain) Carlos Giraldi |
| June 8 | Kayseri, Turkiye; Hard; M15; Singles and doubles draws | (Spain) Iván Marrero Curbelo; 7–6^{(7–2)}, 7–6^{(7–5)} | (United States) Maxwell McKennon | (Bulgaria) Dinko Dinev (Turkey) Haydar Cem Gökpınar | (United States) Keshav Chopra (United States) Adhithya Ganesan (Netherlands) Laurence Teunissen (Ukraine) Volodymyr Iakubenko |
| June 8 | Kayseri, Turkiye; Hard; M15; Singles and doubles draws | (United States) Keshav Chopra (United Kingdom) Stefan Cooper; 7–6^{(7–4)}, 7–6^{(7–5)} | (United States) Jeffrey Fradkin (United States) Maxwell McKennon | (Bulgaria) Dinko Dinev (Turkey) Haydar Cem Gökpınar | (United States) Keshav Chopra (United States) Adhithya Ganesan (Netherlands) Laurence Teunissen (Ukraine) Volodymyr Iakubenko |
| June 8 | Monastir, Tunisia; Hard; M15; Singles and doubles draws | (France) César Bouchelaghem; 6–1, 5–7, 6–4 | (United States) Dominick Mosejczuk | (United Kingdom) Marcus Walters (Spain) Roger Pascual Ferrà | (Tunisia) Aziz Dougaz (Chile) Diego Fernández Flores (Japan) Ryuki Matsuda (France) Paul Barbier Gazeu |
| June 8 | Monastir, Tunisia; Hard; M15; Singles and doubles draws | (Spain) Roger Pascual Ferrà (Spain) Pedro Rodenas; 6–2, 6–2 | (United States) Teodor Cariov (United States) Hayden Shoemake | (United Kingdom) Marcus Walters (Spain) Roger Pascual Ferrà | (Tunisia) Aziz Dougaz (Chile) Diego Fernández Flores (Japan) Ryuki Matsuda (France) Paul Barbier Gazeu |
| June 8 | Los Angeles, United States; Hard; M15; Singles and doubles draws | (United States) Kaylan Bigun; 6–1, 7–5 | (United States) Andrew Johnson | (Canada) Alexander Rozin (United States) Spencer Johnson | (United States) Gus Grumet (United States) Maxwell Exsted (Australia) Benjamin O'Connell (France) Nathan Trouvé |
| June 8 | Los Angeles, United States; Hard; M15; Singles and doubles draws | (New Zealand) Reese Falck (United States) Billy Suarez; 7–5, 6–4 | (United States) Christopher Papa (Germany) Lambert Ruland | (Canada) Alexander Rozin (United States) Spencer Johnson | (United States) Gus Grumet (United States) Maxwell Exsted (Australia) Benjamin O'Connell (France) Nathan Trouvé |
| June 8 | Brasília, Brazil; Hard; M15; Singles and doubles draws | (Mexico) Alex Hernández; 6–4, 6–4 | (Brazil) Nicolas Oliveira | (Argentina) Gonzalo Villanueva (Brazil) Luís Felipe Miguel | (Brazil) João Victor Couto Loureiro (Colombia) Juan Sebastián Osorio (Brazil) Paulo André Saraiva dos Santos (Brazil) Pedro Rodrigues |
| June 8 | Brasília, Brazil; Hard; M15; Singles and doubles draws | (Brazil) Luka Ono (Brazil) Rafael Tosetto; Walkover | (Brazil) Nicolas Oliveira (Brazil) Pedro Rodrigues | (Argentina) Gonzalo Villanueva (Brazil) Luís Felipe Miguel | (Brazil) João Victor Couto Loureiro (Colombia) Juan Sebastián Osorio (Brazil) Paulo André Saraiva dos Santos (Brazil) Pedro Rodrigues |
| June 15 | Lourinhã, Portugal; Hard; M25; Singles and doubles draws | (Netherlands) Thijs Boogaard; 7–5, 2–6, 7–5 | (Portugal) Tiago Torres | (Spain) Pablo Martínez Gómez (Italy) Fabrizio Andaloro | (Venezuela) Oscar Andres Martinez de Freitas (Spain) John Echeverría (Denmark) Carl Emil Overbeck (Portugal) João Domingues |
| June 15 | Lourinhã, Portugal; Hard; M25; Singles and doubles draws | (Portugal) Tiago Cação (Portugal) Diogo Marques; 4–6, 6–2, [10–7] | (Italy) Fabrizio Andaloro (Italy) Filippo Moroni | (Spain) Pablo Martínez Gómez (Italy) Fabrizio Andaloro | (Venezuela) Oscar Andres Martinez de Freitas (Spain) John Echeverría (Denmark) Carl Emil Overbeck (Portugal) João Domingues |
| June 15 | Milan, Italy; Clay; M25; Singles and doubles draws | (Ukraine) Georgii Kravchenko; 7–5, 6–3 | (Italy) Fausto Tabacco | (Italy) Giuseppe La Vela (Italy) Gianmarco Ferrari | (Italy) Stefano D'Agostino (Norway) Viktor Durasovic (Italy) Giorgio Tabacco (Bulgaria) Petr Nesterov |
| June 15 | Milan, Italy; Clay; M25; Singles and doubles draws | (Italy) Jacopo Bilardo (Italy) Giorgio Ricca; 7–6^{(7–5)}, 7–6^{(7–4)} | (Italy) Riccardo Perin (Italy) Luca Potenza | (Italy) Giuseppe La Vela (Italy) Gianmarco Ferrari | (Italy) Stefano D'Agostino (Norway) Viktor Durasovic (Italy) Giorgio Tabacco (Bulgaria) Petr Nesterov |
| June 15 | Klosters, Switzerland; Clay; M25; Singles and doubles draws | (Austria) Sandro Kopp; 7–6^{(7–1)}, 7–6^{(7–4)} | (Switzerland) Dylan Dietrich | (Germany) Kai Wehnelt (Switzerland) Tanguy Genier | (Switzerland) Adrien Burdet (Switzerland) Dominic Stricker (Switzerland) Noah Karma (Switzerland) Henry Bernet |
| June 15 | Klosters, Switzerland; Clay; M25; Singles and doubles draws | (Switzerland) Alessandro Hunziker (Switzerland) Dominic Stricker; Walkover | (Germany) Kai Wehnelt (Germany) Louis Wessels | (Germany) Kai Wehnelt (Switzerland) Tanguy Genier | (Switzerland) Adrien Burdet (Switzerland) Dominic Stricker (Switzerland) Noah Karma (Switzerland) Henry Bernet |
| June 15 | Samobor, Croatia; Clay; M25; Singles and doubles draws | (Ukraine) Nikita Mashtakov; 7–5, 6–7^{(5–7)}, 6–1 | (Bosnia and Herzegovina) Andrej Nedić | Andrey Chepelev (Bulgaria) Dimitar Kuzmanov | (Austria) Sebastian Sorger (Croatia) Mili Poljičak (Slovakia) Jozef Kovalík (France) Nicolas Jadoun |
| June 15 | Samobor, Croatia; Clay; M25; Singles and doubles draws | (Croatia) Karlo Kajin (Ukraine) Nikita Mashtakov; 6–4, 4–6, [10–6] | (Cyprus) Eleftherios Neos (Greece) Petros Tsitsipas | Andrey Chepelev (Bulgaria) Dimitar Kuzmanov | (Austria) Sebastian Sorger (Croatia) Mili Poljičak (Slovakia) Jozef Kovalík (France) Nicolas Jadoun |
| June 15 | Tulsa, United States; Hard; M25; Singles and doubles draws | (United States) J.J. Wolf; 5–7, 6–2, 7–6^{(7–5)} | (United States) Gavin Young | (United States) Andres Martin (United States) Andrew Fenty | (Kazakhstan) Dmitry Popko (United States) Christian Langmo (United States) Maximus Dussault (United States) Braden Shick |
| June 15 | Tulsa, United States; Hard; M25; Singles and doubles draws | (United States) Axel Nefve (United States) Jack Vance; 6–4, 6–4 | (Canada) Justin Boulais (United States) Gavin Young | (United States) Andres Martin (United States) Andrew Fenty | (Kazakhstan) Dmitry Popko (United States) Christian Langmo (United States) Maximus Dussault (United States) Braden Shick |
| June 15 | Tokyo, Japan; Hard; M15; Singles and doubles draws | (Australia) Jake Delaney; 6–1, 6–4 | (Japan) Masamichi Imamura | (Japan) Naoki Nakagawa (United States) Hunter Heck | (Japan) Renta Tokuda (Australia) Max Purcell (Australia) Tai Sach (Japan) Naoya Honda |
| June 15 | Tokyo, Japan; Hard; M15; Singles and doubles draws | (Japan) Yusuke Kusuhara (Australia) Max Purcell; 6–7^{(3–7)}, 6–3, [11–9] | (Australia) Jake Delaney (Japan) Shunsuke Nakagawa | (Japan) Naoki Nakagawa (United States) Hunter Heck | (Japan) Renta Tokuda (Australia) Max Purcell (Australia) Tai Sach (Japan) Naoya Honda |
| June 15 | Ma'anshan, China; Hard (i); M15; Singles and doubles draws | (Australia) Matthew Dellavedova; 7–5, 6–4 | (South Korea) Roh Ho-young | (Malaysia) Mitsuki Wei Kang Leong (Japan) Hiroki Moriya | (Philippines) Alberto Lim Jr. (China) Wang Aoran (Chinese Taipei) Lee Kuan-yi (Australia) Moerani Bouzige |
| June 15 | Ma'anshan, China; Hard (i); M15; Singles and doubles draws | (Australia) Joshua Charlton (Kazakhstan) Grigoriy Lomakin; 6–2, 4–6, [10–7] | (South Korea) Cho Seong-woo (China) Yang Zijiang | (Malaysia) Mitsuki Wei Kang Leong (Japan) Hiroki Moriya | (Philippines) Alberto Lim Jr. (China) Wang Aoran (Chinese Taipei) Lee Kuan-yi (Australia) Moerani Bouzige |
| June 15 | Mungia-Laukariz, Spain; Clay (i); M15; Singles and doubles draws | (Netherlands) Ryan Nijboer; 6–2, 7–6^{(8–6)} | (Spain) Izan Almazán Valiente | (Spain) Sergi Pérez Contri (Netherlands) Michiel de Krom | (Nicaragua) Joaquín Guilleme (Spain) Alejandro Juan Mano (Spain) Noah Lopez Cherubino (Spain) Oscar José Gutierrez |
| June 15 | Mungia-Laukariz, Spain; Clay (i); M15; Singles and doubles draws | (Netherlands) Michiel de Krom (Netherlands) Ryan Nijboer; 7–5, 6–3 | (Spain) Jordi García Mestre (Spain) David Naharro | (Spain) Sergi Pérez Contri (Netherlands) Michiel de Krom | (Nicaragua) Joaquín Guilleme (Spain) Alejandro Juan Mano (Spain) Noah Lopez Cherubino (Spain) Oscar José Gutierrez |
| June 15 | Bourg-en-Bresse, France; Clay; M15; Singles and doubles draws | (France) Théo Papamalamis; 7–5, 6–3 | (Cyprus) Melios Efstathiou | (Germany) Mika Petkovic (France) Mickael Kaouk | (France) Clément Lemire (Italy) Gianmarco Gandolfi (Italy) Filiberto Fumagalli (France) Charles Bertimon |
| June 15 | Bourg-en-Bresse, France; Clay; M15; Singles and doubles draws | (France) Aaron Gabet (France) Mickael Kaouk; 6–1, 6–3 | (Luxembourg) Yannick Baluska (France) Théo Papamalamis | (Germany) Mika Petkovic (France) Mickael Kaouk | (France) Clément Lemire (Italy) Gianmarco Gandolfi (Italy) Filiberto Fumagalli (France) Charles Bertimon |
| June 15 | Saarlouis, Germany; Clay; M15; Singles and doubles draws | (Germany) Marlon Vankan; 6–4, 6–2 | (Netherlands) Pieter de Lange | (Germany) Moritz Kudernatsch (Poland) Marcel Zieliński | (Thailand) Markus Malaszszak (Germany) Nikolai Barsukov (Norway) Johan Oscar Lien (Germany) Yannik Kelm |
| June 15 | Saarlouis, Germany; Clay; M15; Singles and doubles draws | (Netherlands) Manvydas Balciunas (Netherlands) Pieter de Lange; 7–5, 2–6, [10–7] | (Germany) Taym Al Azmeh (Germany) Vincent Marysko | (Germany) Moritz Kudernatsch (Poland) Marcel Zieliński | (Thailand) Markus Malaszszak (Germany) Nikolai Barsukov (Norway) Johan Oscar Lien (Germany) Yannik Kelm |
| June 15 | Gyula, Hungary; Clay; M15; Singles and doubles draws | (Italy) Pietro Fellin; 6–4, 6–4 | (Austria) Nico Hipfl | (Ukraine) Aleksandr Braynin (Uzbekistan) Khumoyun Sultanov | (Germany) John Sperle (Hungary) Péter Fajta (Sweden) John Hallquist Lithén (Hungary) Máté Valkusz |
| June 15 | Gyula, Hungary; Clay; M15; Singles and doubles draws | (Ukraine) Aleksandr Braynin (Ukraine) Andriy Poritskyy; 6–4, 7–6^{(8–6)} | (Hungary) Patrik Meszaros (Hungary) Péter Sallay | (Ukraine) Aleksandr Braynin (Uzbekistan) Khumoyun Sultanov | (Germany) John Sperle (Hungary) Péter Fajta (Sweden) John Hallquist Lithén (Hungary) Máté Valkusz |
| June 15 | Constanța, Romania; Clay; M15; Singles and doubles draws | (Romania) Dan Alexandru Tomescu; 4–6, 6–3, 3–0 ret. | (Romania) Gabi Adrian Boitan | (Romania) Cezar Gabriel Papoe (Romania) Ștefan Paloși | (Romania) Radu David Țurcanu (Romania) Robert Guna (Romania) Sebastian Gima (Romania) Ștefan Adrian Andreescu |
| June 15 | Constanța, Romania; Clay; M15; Singles and doubles draws | (Spain) Valentín González-Galiño (Argentina) Julio César Porras; 7–6^{(7–4)}, 6–1 | (Romania) Mihai David Haita (Romania) Radu David Țurcanu | (Romania) Cezar Gabriel Papoe (Romania) Ștefan Paloși | (Romania) Radu David Țurcanu (Romania) Robert Guna (Romania) Sebastian Gima (Romania) Ștefan Adrian Andreescu |
| June 15 | Kuršumlijska Banja, Serbia; Clay; M15; Singles and doubles draws | (Serbia) Branko Đurić; 2–0 ret. | (Italy) Andrea De Marchi | (Bulgaria) George Lazarov (Italy) Gabriele Maria Noce | (United Kingdom) Oscar Brown (Serbia) Vuk Radjenovic; Savva Rybkin (Serbia) Simeon Stanković |
| June 15 | Kuršumlijska Banja, Serbia; Clay; M15; Singles and doubles draws | (Argentina) Lorenzo Gagliardo (Argentina) Valentin Guadagno; 6–3, 1–6, [10–7] | (Serbia) Vuk Radjenovic (Australia) Brandon Walkin | (Bulgaria) George Lazarov (Italy) Gabriele Maria Noce | (United Kingdom) Oscar Brown (Serbia) Vuk Radjenovic; Savva Rybkin (Serbia) Simeon Stanković |
| June 15 | Kayseri, Turkiye; Hard; M15; Singles and doubles draws | (Spain) Iván Marrero Curbelo; 6–3, 6–3 | (United States) Keshav Chopra | (France) Nicolas Tepmahc (Turkey) Kerem Yılmaz | (Ukraine) Volodymyr Iakubenko (Saudi Arabia) Ammar Alhogbani (Ukraine) Yurii Dzhavakian (India) Rethin Pranav Senthil Kumar |
| June 15 | Kayseri, Turkiye; Hard; M15; Singles and doubles draws | (United States) Keshav Chopra (Spain) Iván Marrero Curbelo; 6–2, 6–3 | (China) Jiang Fumin (Kuwait) Essa Qabazard | (France) Nicolas Tepmahc (Turkey) Kerem Yılmaz | (Ukraine) Volodymyr Iakubenko (Saudi Arabia) Ammar Alhogbani (Ukraine) Yurii Dzhavakian (India) Rethin Pranav Senthil Kumar |
| June 15 | Monastir, Tunisia; Hard; M15; Singles and doubles draws | (Tunisia) Aziz Ouakaa; 6–4, 6–3 | (Turkey) Ergi Kırkın | (Italy) Andrea Colombo (United Kingdom) Billy Blaydes | (United Kingdom) Viktor Frydrych (Spain) Pedro Rodenas (Spain) Roger Pascual Ferrà (France) Paul Inchauspé |
| June 15 | Monastir, Tunisia; Hard; M15; Singles and doubles draws | (Italy) Andrea Colombo (Monaco) Rocco Piatti; 3–6, 6–3, [14–12] | (France) César Bouchelaghem (France) Romain Gales | (Italy) Andrea Colombo (United Kingdom) Billy Blaydes | (United Kingdom) Viktor Frydrych (Spain) Pedro Rodenas (Spain) Roger Pascual Ferrà (France) Paul Inchauspé |
| June 15 | Irvine, United States; Hard; M15; Singles and doubles draws | (United States) Spencer Johnson; 6–3, 7–6^{(7–1)} | (United States) Bryce Nakashima | (Japan) Kenta Miyoshi (United States) Strong Kirchheimer | (United States) Ronit Karki (United States) Rudy Quan (Germany) Neo Niedner (United States) Noah Zamora |
| June 15 | Irvine, United States; Hard; M15; Singles and doubles draws | (United States) Spencer Johnson (United States) Emon van Loben Sels; 6–7^{(5–7)}, 6–4, [10–6] | (United States) Sam Landau (United States) Noah Zamora | (Japan) Kenta Miyoshi (United States) Strong Kirchheimer | (United States) Ronit Karki (United States) Rudy Quan (Germany) Neo Niedner (United States) Noah Zamora |
| June 22 | Porto, Portugal; Hard; M25; Singles and doubles draws | (Denmark) Carl Emil Overbeck; 6–3, 6–2 | (Turkey) Mert Alkaya | (Portugal) Francisco Rocha (Portugal) Tiago Torres | (Ivory Coast) Eliakim Coulibaly (Italy) Fabrizio Andaloro (United Kingdom) Lui Maxted; Daniil Ostapenkov |
| June 22 | Porto, Portugal; Hard; M25; Singles and doubles draws | (Italy) Fabrizio Andaloro (Italy) Filippo Moroni; 6–3, 5–7, [10–7] | (United Kingdom) Tom Hands (United Kingdom) Matthew Summers | (Portugal) Francisco Rocha (Portugal) Tiago Torres | (Ivory Coast) Eliakim Coulibaly (Italy) Fabrizio Andaloro (United Kingdom) Lui Maxted; Daniil Ostapenkov |
| June 22 | Bakio, Spain; Hard; M25; Singles and doubles draws | (France) Paul Inchauspé; 4–6, 7–6^{(7–3)}, 6–3 | (United Kingdom) Oscar Weightman | (Spain) Sergio Callejón Hernando (Spain) Sergi Pérez Contri | (Germany) Diego Dedura (United Kingdom) Emile Hudd (Australia) Edward Winter (France) Robin Bertrand |
| June 22 | Bakio, Spain; Hard; M25; Singles and doubles draws | (Colombia) Alejandro Arcila (Spain) Carles Rojas; 3–6, 6–3, [10–7] | (United Kingdom) Liam Hignett (United Kingdom) Matthew Howse | (Spain) Sergio Callejón Hernando (Spain) Sergi Pérez Contri | (Germany) Diego Dedura (United Kingdom) Emile Hudd (Australia) Edward Winter (France) Robin Bertrand |
| June 22 | Brussels, Belgium; Clay; M25; Singles and doubles draws | (Germany) Max Hans Rehberg; 6–1, 6–2 | (Switzerland) Dylan Dietrich | (Germany) Marvin Möller (Sweden) Olle Wallin | (Germany) Tom Zeuch (Lebanon) Fadi Bidan (Belgium) Harold Huens (Italy) Samuele Pieri |
| June 22 | Brussels, Belgium; Clay; M25; Singles and doubles draws | (Germany) Kai Wehnelt (Germany) Tom Zeuch; 6–0, 6–3 | (Belgium) Nicolas Ifi (Germany) Cedric Stanke | (Germany) Marvin Möller (Sweden) Olle Wallin | (Germany) Tom Zeuch (Lebanon) Fadi Bidan (Belgium) Harold Huens (Italy) Samuele Pieri |
| June 22 | Zagreb, Croatia; Clay; M25; Singles and doubles draws | (Uzbekistan) Khumoyun Sultanov; 6–4, 6–4 | (North Macedonia) Kalin Ivanovski | (North Macedonia) Oleg Prihodko (Croatia) Božo Barun | (Greece) Dimitris Sakellaridis (Austria) Sebastian Sorger (Spain) Javier Barranco Cosano; Andrey Chepelev |
| June 22 | Zagreb, Croatia; Clay; M25; Singles and doubles draws | (Czech Republic) Jan Kumstát (Czech Republic) Jakub Vrba; 6–4, 6–3 | (Cyprus) Eleftherios Neos (Greece) Petros Tsitsipas | (North Macedonia) Oleg Prihodko (Croatia) Božo Barun | (Greece) Dimitris Sakellaridis (Austria) Sebastian Sorger (Spain) Javier Barranco Cosano; Andrey Chepelev |
| June 22 | Tangier, Morocco; Clay; M25; Singles and doubles draws | (Morocco) Yassine Dlimi; 7–6^{(7–2)}, 6–4 | (Morocco) Karim Bennani | (Italy) Lorenzo Rottoli (France) Sean Cuenin | (Germany) Florian Broska (Italy) Massimo Giunta (Switzerland) Johan Nikles (Morocco) Reda Bennani |
| June 22 | Tangier, Morocco; Clay; M25; Singles and doubles draws | (Morocco) Younes Lalami (Switzerland) Johan Nikles; 6–4, 6–4 | (France) Matthieu Chambonniere (France) Édouard Villoslada | (Italy) Lorenzo Rottoli (France) Sean Cuenin | (Germany) Florian Broska (Italy) Massimo Giunta (Switzerland) Johan Nikles (Morocco) Reda Bennani |
| June 22 | Wuning, China; Hard; M15; Singles and doubles draws | (Australia) Max Purcell; 6–0, 6–1 | (Australia) Matthew Dellavedova | (Chinese Taipei) Lee Kuan-yi (China) Han Xirui | (Japan) Yuta Kawahashi (China) Chen Ye (South Korea) Kim Dong-ju (China) Meng Fanming |
| June 22 | Wuning, China; Hard; M15; Singles and doubles draws | (Australia) Max Purcell (China) Zhao Zhao; 6–7^{(6–8)}, 6–3, [10–5] | (Philippines) Francis Alcantara (Chinese Taipei) Hsieh Cheng-peng | (Chinese Taipei) Lee Kuan-yi (China) Han Xirui | (Japan) Yuta Kawahashi (China) Chen Ye (South Korea) Kim Dong-ju (China) Meng Fanming |
| June 22 | Alkmaar, Netherlands; Clay; M15; Singles and doubles draws | (Germany) Marc Majdandzic; 7–6^{(7–5)}, 6–4 | (Netherlands) Pieter de Lange | (Spain) Manel Lazaro Juncadella (Netherlands) Jesse de Jager | (Netherlands) Fons van Sambeek (Germany) Julien Penzlin (Japan) Ryo Tabata (Netherlands) Sander Jong |
| June 22 | Alkmaar, Netherlands; Clay; M15; Singles and doubles draws | (Sweden) Filip Gustafsson (Germany) Julien Penzlin; 4–6, 7–6^{(7–5)}, [10–8] | (Netherlands) Abel Forger (Netherlands) Elgin Khoeblal | (Spain) Manel Lazaro Juncadella (Netherlands) Jesse de Jager | (Netherlands) Fons van Sambeek (Germany) Julien Penzlin (Japan) Ryo Tabata (Netherlands) Sander Jong |
| June 22 | Kamen, Germany; Clay; M15; Singles and doubles draws | (Ukraine) Oleksii Krutykh; 6–1, 6–3 | (Germany) Benito Sanchez Martinez | (Colombia) Daniel Salazar (Germany) Vincent Marysko | (Netherlands) Brian Bozemoj (Czech Republic) Jakub Filip (Germany) Michel Hopp (Germany) Aaron Funk |
| June 22 | Kamen, Germany; Clay; M15; Singles and doubles draws | (Czech Republic) Ondřej Horák (Czech Republic) Štěpán Pecák; 6–3, 6–1 | (Germany) Karim Al-Amin (Germany) Lambert Ruland | (Colombia) Daniel Salazar (Germany) Vincent Marysko | (Netherlands) Brian Bozemoj (Czech Republic) Jakub Filip (Germany) Michel Hopp (Germany) Aaron Funk |
| June 22 | Bergamo, Italy; Clay; M15; Singles and doubles draws | (Italy) Federico Arnaboldi; 6–0, 7–5 | (Italy) Giovanni Oradini | (Italy) Fausto Tabacco (Italy) Pietro Scomparin | (Czech Republic) Matthew William Donald (Italy) Filiberto Fumagalli (Italy) Denis Spiridon (Italy) Marcello Serafini |
| June 22 | Bergamo, Italy; Clay; M15; Singles and doubles draws | (Italy) Jacopo Bilardo (Italy) Alessandro Ingarao; 6–4, 7–6^{(7–4)} | (Italy) Lorenzo Bocchi (Italy) Alessio De Bernardis | (Italy) Fausto Tabacco (Italy) Pietro Scomparin | (Czech Republic) Matthew William Donald (Italy) Filiberto Fumagalli (Italy) Denis Spiridon (Italy) Marcello Serafini |
| June 22 | Slovenska Bistrica, Slovenia; Clay; M15; Singles and doubles draws | (Argentina) Lucio Ratti; 3–6, 6–4, 6–1 | (Slovenia) Filip Jeff Planinšek | (Czech Republic) Denis Peták (Slovenia) Bor Artnak | (Germany) Vincent Dullinger (Slovenia) Nik Miković (Germany) Maximilian Homberg (Slovenia) Aljaz Jeran |
| June 22 | Slovenska Bistrica, Slovenia; Clay; M15; Singles and doubles draws | (Switzerland) Nicolás Parizzia (Argentina) Lucio Ratti; 7–6^{(7–5)}, 6–2 | (Germany) Maximilian Homberg (Sweden) Nikola Slavic | (Czech Republic) Denis Peták (Slovenia) Bor Artnak | (Germany) Vincent Dullinger (Slovenia) Nik Miković (Germany) Maximilian Homberg (Slovenia) Aljaz Jeran |
| June 22 | Rzeszów, Poland; Clay; M15; Singles and doubles draws | (Norway) Herman Hoeyeraal; 4–6, 6–4, 6–2 | (Poland) Alan Ważny | (Germany) Stefan Seifert (Poland) Kacper Szymkowiak | (Norway) Leyton Rivera (Ukraine) Aleksandr Braynin (Germany) Niklas Guttau (Poland) Karol Filar |
| June 22 | Rzeszów, Poland; Clay; M15; Singles and doubles draws | (Estonia) Markus Mölder (Estonia) Kristjan Tamm; 5–7, 7–5, [10–8] | (Czech Republic) Patrik Homola (Czech Republic) Jan Hrazdil | (Germany) Stefan Seifert (Poland) Kacper Szymkowiak | (Norway) Leyton Rivera (Ukraine) Aleksandr Braynin (Germany) Niklas Guttau (Poland) Karol Filar |
| June 22 | Kuršumlijska Banja, Serbia; Clay; M15; Singles and doubles draws | (Serbia) Branko Đurić; 5–7, 7–5, 6–3 | (Italy) Andrea De Marchi | (Spain) Álvaro Peiró Serrano (Italy) Giannicola Misasi | Evgenii Tiurnev (Serbia) Novak Novaković (Algeria) Samir Hamza Reguig (Bulgaria) George Lazarov |
| June 22 | Kuršumlijska Banja, Serbia; Clay; M15; Singles and doubles draws | (Italy) Andrea De Marchi; Timofei Derepasko; 7–6^{(7–0)}, 4–6, [10–4] | (Serbia) Nikola Jović (North Macedonia) Obrad Markovski | (Spain) Álvaro Peiró Serrano (Italy) Giannicola Misasi | Evgenii Tiurnev (Serbia) Novak Novaković (Algeria) Samir Hamza Reguig (Bulgaria) George Lazarov |
| June 22 | Kayseri, Turkiye; Hard; M15; Singles and doubles draws | (India) Rethin Pranav Senthil Kumar; 6–3, 7–5 | (United States) Keshav Chopra | (France) Constantin Bittoun Kouzmine (France) Theo Herrmann | (Turkey) Kerem Yılmaz (Greece) Dimitris Azoidis (Turkey) Bora Şengül (United States) Roman Sancilio |
| June 22 | Kayseri, Turkiye; Hard; M15; Singles and doubles draws | (Turkey) Melih Anavatan (Turkey) Kerem Yılmaz; 5–7, 6–4, [10–6] | (France) Theo Herrmann (France) Nicolas Tepmahc | (France) Constantin Bittoun Kouzmine (France) Theo Herrmann | (Turkey) Kerem Yılmaz (Greece) Dimitris Azoidis (Turkey) Bora Şengül (United States) Roman Sancilio |
| June 22 | Monastir, Tunisia; Hard; M15; Singles and doubles draws | (Spain) Roger Pascual Ferrà; 5–7, 6–2, 6–4 | (France) Mathys Picard | (Slovakia) Lukáš Pokorný (France) Charles Bertimon | (France) Benjamin Pietri (United States) Dominick Mosejczuk (United States) Alexander Frusina (Sweden) Jonas Eriksson Ziverts |
| June 22 | Monastir, Tunisia; Hard; M15; Singles and doubles draws | (New Zealand) Nick Beamish (New Zealand) Isaac Becroft; 7–6^{(9–7)}, 2–6, [10–8] | (France) César Bouchelaghem (France) Romain Gales | (Slovakia) Lukáš Pokorný (France) Charles Bertimon | (France) Benjamin Pietri (United States) Dominick Mosejczuk (United States) Alexander Frusina (Sweden) Jonas Eriksson Ziverts |
| June 22 | Claremont, United States; Hard; M15; Singles and doubles draws | (United States) Spencer Johnson; 6–4, 6–3 | (Canada) Alexander Rozin | (United States) Jagger Leach (United States) Jack Satterfield | (United States) Aidan Kim (Estonia) Oliver Ojakäär (Italy) Lorenzo Claverie (United States) Vignesh Gogineni |
| June 22 | Claremont, United States; Hard; M15; Singles and doubles draws | (United States) Matt Kuhar (United States) Henry Lieberman; 7–5, 6–1 | (United States) Michael Blando (United States) Hugo Hashimoto | (United States) Jagger Leach (United States) Jack Satterfield | (United States) Aidan Kim (Estonia) Oliver Ojakäär (Italy) Lorenzo Claverie (United States) Vignesh Gogineni |
| June 29 | Figueira da Foz, Portugal; Hard; M25; Singles and doubles draws | (Denmark) Carl Emil Overbeck; 6–1, 3–6, 6–3 | (Switzerland) Patrick Schoen | (Portugal) Tiago Torres (Slovenia) Sebastian Dominko | (Portugal) Rodrigo Fernandes; Daniil Ostapenkov (Portugal) Tiago Cação (Portugal) Gonçalo Marques |
| June 29 | Figueira da Foz, Portugal; Hard; M25; Singles and doubles draws | (Denmark) Carl Emil Overbeck (Denmark) Oskar Brostrøm Poulsen; 3–6, 6–3, [11–9] | (United Kingdom) Tom Hands (United Kingdom) Matthew Summers | (Portugal) Tiago Torres (Slovenia) Sebastian Dominko | (Portugal) Rodrigo Fernandes; Daniil Ostapenkov (Portugal) Tiago Cação (Portugal) Gonçalo Marques |
| June 29 | Ajaccio, France; Hard; M25+H; Singles and doubles draws | (France) Laurent Lokoli; 3–6, 6–3, 6–2 | (France) Dan Added | (France) Matisse Bobichon (France) Luc Fomba | (France) Paul Inchauspé (France) Benjamin Pietri (Spain) Sergio Callejon Hernando (France) Robin Catry |
| June 29 | Ajaccio, France; Hard; M25+H; Singles and doubles draws | (France) Grégoire Jacq (France) Lucas Poullain; 7–6^{(7–4)}, 6–2 | (Switzerland) Tanguy Genier (Switzerland) Timofey Stepanov | (France) Matisse Bobichon (France) Luc Fomba | (France) Paul Inchauspé (France) Benjamin Pietri (Spain) Sergio Callejon Hernando (France) Robin Catry |
| June 29 | Nivelles, Belgium; Clay; M25; Singles and doubles draws | (Germany) Yannik Kelm; 6–3, 6–4 | (Germany) Jannik Opitz | (Belgium) Kimmer Coppejans (Germany) Mika Petkovic | Kirill Kivattsev (Austria) Nico Hipfl (Belgium) Émilien Demanet (Czech Republic) Jonáš Forejtek |
| June 29 | Nivelles, Belgium; Clay; M25; Singles and doubles draws | (Germany) Jannik Opitz (Latvia) Robert Strombachs; 6–4, 6–4 | (Austria) Nico Hipfl (Germany) Niklas Schell | (Belgium) Kimmer Coppejans (Germany) Mika Petkovic | Kirill Kivattsev (Austria) Nico Hipfl (Belgium) Émilien Demanet (Czech Republic) Jonáš Forejtek |
| June 29 | Marburg, Germany; Clay; M25; Singles and doubles draws | (Germany) Max Wiskandt; 6–1, 6–4 | (Czech Republic) Daniel Siniakov | (Slovenia) Filip Jeff Planinšek (Germany) Michel Hopp | (Uzbekistan) Khumoyun Sultanov (Sweden) Jonathan Mridha (Georgia (country)) Saba Purtseladze (Germany) Oliver Majdandzic |
| June 29 | Marburg, Germany; Clay; M25; Singles and doubles draws | (Czech Republic) Dominik Reček (Czech Republic) Daniel Siniakov; 6–0, 6–2 | (Ukraine) Oleksii Krutykh (Spain) Imanol López Morillo | (Slovenia) Filip Jeff Planinšek (Germany) Michel Hopp | (Uzbekistan) Khumoyun Sultanov (Sweden) Jonathan Mridha (Georgia (country)) Saba Purtseladze (Germany) Oliver Majdandzic |
| June 29 | Skopje, North Macedonia; Clay; M25; Singles and doubles draws | (North Macedonia) Kalin Ivanovski; 6–1, 0–6, 6–2 | (Ukraine) Vladyslav Orlov | (Bulgaria) Yanaki Milev (Serbia) Stefan Popović | (Italy) Alexander Weis (Austria) Sebastian Sorger (Montenegro) Petar Jovanović (Chile) Nicolás Bruna |
| June 29 | Skopje, North Macedonia; Clay; M25; Singles and doubles draws | (North Macedonia) Obrad Markovski (North Macedonia) Gorazd Srbljak; 7–5, 6–3 | (Bulgaria) Nikola Keremedchiev (Bulgaria) David Simeonov | (Bulgaria) Yanaki Milev (Serbia) Stefan Popović | (Italy) Alexander Weis (Austria) Sebastian Sorger (Montenegro) Petar Jovanović (Chile) Nicolás Bruna |
| June 29 | Rabat, Morocco; Clay; M25; Singles and doubles draws | (Morocco) Reda Bennani; 2–6, 6–4, 6–2 | (Italy) Massimo Giunta | (Morocco) Walid Ahouda (France) Sean Cuenin | (Germany) Florian Broska (Switzerland) Johan Nikles (Morocco) Karim Bennani (Finland) Eero Vasa |
| June 29 | Rabat, Morocco; Clay; M25; Singles and doubles draws | (Kuwait) Bader Alabdullah (Kuwait) Essa Qabazard; 2–6, 7–5, [10–7] | (France) Matthieu Chambonniere (France) Édouard Villoslada | (Morocco) Walid Ahouda (France) Sean Cuenin | (Germany) Florian Broska (Switzerland) Johan Nikles (Morocco) Karim Bennani (Finland) Eero Vasa |
| June 29 | Tokyo, Japan; Hard; M15; Singles and doubles draws | (Australia) Matthew Dellavedova; 6–3, 6–4 | (South Korea) Shin San-hui | (Thailand) Maximus Jones (Thailand) Kasidit Samrej | (Japan) Koki Matsuda (Japan) Kokoro Isomura (Australia) Omar Jasika (Japan) Shintaro Imai |
| June 29 | Tokyo, Japan; Hard; M15; Singles and doubles draws | (Japan) Yusuke Kusuhara (Japan) Shunsuke Nakagawa; 6–3, 7–6^{(7–2)} | (Japan) Shinji Hazawa (Japan) Kosuke Ogura | (Thailand) Maximus Jones (Thailand) Kasidit Samrej | (Japan) Koki Matsuda (Japan) Kokoro Isomura (Australia) Omar Jasika (Japan) Shintaro Imai |
| June 29 | Wuning, China; Hard; M15; Singles and doubles draws | (Indonesia) Muhammad Rifqi Fitriadi; 6–3, 6–3 | Amirkhamza Nasridinov | (Japan) Asahi Harazaki (China) Zhang Tianhui | (South Korea) Roh Ho-young (China) Zeng Yaojie (China) Liu Hanyi (Australia) Chase Ferguson |
| June 29 | Wuning, China; Hard; M15; Singles and doubles draws | (China) Liu Shaoyun (China) Yang Xiaoyin; 5–7, 7–6^{(7–3)}, [10–7] | (Chinese Taipei) Lin Nan-hsun (China) Yang Zijiang | (Japan) Asahi Harazaki (China) Zhang Tianhui | (South Korea) Roh Ho-young (China) Zeng Yaojie (China) Liu Hanyi (Australia) Chase Ferguson |
| June 29 | Getxo, Spain; Clay; M15; Singles and doubles draws | (Spain) Carles Hernández; 3–6, 6–4, 6–4 | (Spain) Oscar José Gutiérrez | (Venezuela) Ignacio Parisca Romera (Spain) Alejandro García Carbajal | (Poland) Marcel Zieliński (Spain) Sergi Fita Juan (Slovenia) Luka Talan Lopatič (Spain) Pedro Ródenas |
| June 29 | Getxo, Spain; Clay; M15; Singles and doubles draws | (France) Timeo Bretin (France) Julien Dando; 6–4, 6–2 | (Spain) Bryan Hernández Cortés (Spain) Pablo Roche Alcaya | (Venezuela) Ignacio Parisca Romera (Spain) Alejandro García Carbajal | (Poland) Marcel Zieliński (Spain) Sergi Fita Juan (Slovenia) Luka Talan Lopatič (Spain) Pedro Ródenas |
| June 29 | Amstelveen, Netherlands; Clay; M15; Singles and doubles draws | (Netherlands) Pieter de Lange; 2–6, 7–5, 1–0 ret. | (Czech Republic) Jakub Nicod | (Netherlands) Abel Forger (Syria) Hazem Naw | (Netherlands) Manvydas Balciunas (Japan) Ryo Tabata (Italy) Gabriele Maria Noce (Italy) Pietro Marino |
| June 29 | Amstelveen, Netherlands; Clay; M15; Singles and doubles draws | (Netherlands) Abel Forger (Netherlands) Elgin Khoeblal; 7–6^{(7–5)}, 6–1 | (Italy) Pietro Marino (Italy) Gabriele Maria Noce | (Netherlands) Abel Forger (Syria) Hazem Naw | (Netherlands) Manvydas Balciunas (Japan) Ryo Tabata (Italy) Gabriele Maria Noce (Italy) Pietro Marino |
| June 29 | Štore, Slovenia; Clay; M15; Singles and doubles draws | (Germany) Luca Wiedenmann; 6–4, 6–2 | (Italy) Niccolo Baroni | (Italy) Davide Tortora (Italy) Stefano D'Agostino | (Slovenia) Marko Retelj (Hungary) Attila Boros (United States) Michael Savano (Sweden) Nikola Slavic |
| June 29 | Štore, Slovenia; Clay; M15; Singles and doubles draws | (Sweden) Oskar Jansson (Sweden) Melvin Kumar; 1–6, 6–4, [10–7] | (Czech Republic) Štěpán Baum (Czech Republic) Denis Peták | (Italy) Davide Tortora (Italy) Stefano D'Agostino | (Slovenia) Marko Retelj (Hungary) Attila Boros (United States) Michael Savano (Sweden) Nikola Slavic |
| June 29 | Umag, Croatia; Clay; M15; Singles and doubles draws | (Italy) Lorenzo Angelini; 6–3, 6–1 | (Italy) Luca Castagnola | (Slovakia) Andrej Martin (Czech Republic) Matyaš Černy | (Italy) Lorenzo Bocchi (Italy) Giovanni Oradini (Czech Republic) Jonas Kučera (Italy) Pietro Fellin |
| June 29 | Umag, Croatia; Clay; M15; Singles and doubles draws | (Italy) Pietro Fellin (Italy) Giovanni Oradini; 6–3, 6–1 | (Bosnia and Herzegovina) Ivan Biletić (Croatia) Emanuel Ivanišević | (Slovakia) Andrej Martin (Czech Republic) Matyaš Černy | (Italy) Lorenzo Bocchi (Italy) Giovanni Oradini (Czech Republic) Jonas Kučera (Italy) Pietro Fellin |
| June 29 | Kuršumlijska Banja, Serbia; Clay; M15; Singles and doubles draws | (Serbia) Dušan Obradović; 7–6^{(7–4)}, 6–1 | Timofei Derepasko | Semen Pankin (Serbia) Kristijan Juhas | (Moldova) Ilya Snițari (Italy) Andrea de Marchi (Serbia) Vlado Jankanj (Serbia) Aleksa Pisarić |
| June 29 | Kuršumlijska Banja, Serbia; Clay; M15; Singles and doubles draws | (Serbia) Kristijan Juhas (Serbia) Dušan Obradović; Walkover | Anton Arzhankin; Vardan Manukyan | Semen Pankin (Serbia) Kristijan Juhas | (Moldova) Ilya Snițari (Italy) Andrea de Marchi (Serbia) Vlado Jankanj (Serbia) Aleksa Pisarić |
| June 29 | Kayseri, Turkiye; Hard; M15; Singles and doubles draws | (France) Constantin Bittoun Kouzmine; 6–3, 3–6, 6–4 | (United States) Matias Reyniak | (Turkey) Mert Naci Türker (Greece) Dimitris Azoidis | (Saudi Arabia) Ammar Alhogbani (Turkey) Melih Anavatan (Italy) Alessandro Coccioli (Turkey) S Mert Özdemir |
| June 29 | Kayseri, Turkiye; Hard; M15; Singles and doubles draws | (Turkey) Arda Azkara (Turkey) S Mert Özdemir; 6–2, 7–6^{(7–3)} | (France) Constantin Bittoun Kouzmine (Czech Republic) Daniel Blažka | (Turkey) Mert Naci Türker (Greece) Dimitris Azoidis | (Saudi Arabia) Ammar Alhogbani (Turkey) Melih Anavatan (Italy) Alessandro Coccioli (Turkey) S Mert Özdemir |
| June 29 | Hillcrest, South Africa; Hard; M15; Singles and doubles draws | (South Africa) Khololwam Montsi; 7–5, 6–4 | (South Africa) Devin Badenhorst | (United Kingdom) Henry Jefferson (Israel) Ofek Shimanov | (South Africa) Kris van Wyk (Monaco) Rocco Piatti (Israel) Orel Kimhi (Netherlands) Alec Deckers |
| June 29 | Hillcrest, South Africa; Hard; M15; Singles and doubles draws | (South Africa) Marc van der Merwe (United States) Gray Voelzke; 6–3, 7–6^{(7–4)} | (Israel) Ofek Shimanov (Hungary) Zsombor Velcz | (United Kingdom) Henry Jefferson (Israel) Ofek Shimanov | (South Africa) Kris van Wyk (Monaco) Rocco Piatti (Israel) Orel Kimhi (Netherlands) Alec Deckers |
| June 29 | Monastir, Tunisia; Hard; M15; Singles and doubles draws | (Tunisia) Aziz Dougaz; 6–7^{(3–7)}, 6–0, 6–3 | (France) César Bouchelaghem | (Tunisia) Aziz Ouakaa (Turkey) Tuncay Duran | (Iran) Ali Yazdani (United States) Alexander Frusina (Tunisia) Aziz Dougaz (Algeria) Toufik Sahtali |
| June 29 | Monastir, Tunisia; Hard; M15; Singles and doubles draws | (United Kingdom) Billy Blaydes (United States) Alexander Frusina; 4–6, 7–6^{(7–3)}, [10–4] | (Turkey) Tuncay Duran (Turkey) Gökberk Sarıtaş | (Tunisia) Aziz Ouakaa (Turkey) Tuncay Duran | (Iran) Ali Yazdani (United States) Alexander Frusina (Tunisia) Aziz Dougaz (Algeria) Toufik Sahtali |
| June 29 | San Diego, United States; Hard; M15; Singles and doubles draws | (United States) Bryce Nakashima; 6–2, 7–6^{(7–2)} | (United States) Aidan Kim | (United States) Liam Krall (United States) Noah Zamora | (United States) Theodore Dean (United States) Alexander Petrov (Slovenia) Matic Križnik (United States) Vignesh Gogineni |
| June 29 | San Diego, United States; Hard; M15; Singles and doubles draws | (United States) Maxwell Exsted (United States) Noah Johnston; 3–6, 6–4, [11–9] | (United States) Vignesh Gogineni (New Zealand) Matthew Shearer | (United States) Liam Krall (United States) Noah Zamora | (United States) Theodore Dean (United States) Alexander Petrov (Slovenia) Matic Križnik (United States) Vignesh Gogineni |
