= Radu David Țurcanu =

Romanian tennis player (born 2006)

- Country (sports): Romania
- Born: 16 March 2006 (age 20) Bucharest, Romania
- Height: 1.85 m (6 ft 1 in)
- Plays: Left-handed (two-handed backhand)
- Coach: Vlad Marinescu, Alex Joitoiu
- Prize money: US $40,036

Singles
- Career record: 3–1 (at ATP Tour level, Grand Slam level, and in Davis Cup)
- Career titles: 0
- Highest ranking: No. 648 (3 August 2026)
- Current ranking: No. 648 (19 October 2026)

Doubles
- Career record: 0–0 (at ATP Tour level, Grand Slam level, and in Davis Cup)
- Career titles: 0
- Highest ranking: No. 484 (24 August 2026)
- Current ranking: No. 515 (19 October 2026)
- Last updated on: 19 October 2026.

Radu David Țurcanu (born 16 March 2006) is a Romanian tennis player. He has a career-high ATP singles ranking of No. 648 achieved on 3 August 2026 and a doubles ranking of No. 484 achieved on 24 August 2026. Țurcanu reached an Tennis Europe U16 ranking of No. 23 and ITF junior combined ranking of No. 89 achieved on 18 March 2024.

He represents Romania at the Davis Cup, where he has a win-loss record of 3–0.

Țurcanu has trained at the Victor Hănescu Academy.

== Career ==
In juniors, he qualified into the main draw of the Australian Open singles.

In June 2025, he became the first Romanian born after 2003 to reach a final on the ITF Tour. In August, he won his first ITF Tour singles tournament, defeating Radu Mihai Papoe.

Țurcanu received a wildcard into the main singles draw of the 2026 Țiriac Open, where he lost to Alexander Shevchenko in the first round.

In July 2026, Țurcanu won his second ITF Tour singles tournament, defeating Oleksandr Ovcharenko.

== ITF World Tennis Tour finals ==
=== Singles: 5 (2 titles, 3 runner-ups) ===
Finals by surface
Hard (0–0)
Clay (2–3)
Grass (0–0)

Result	W–L	Date	Tournament	Tier	Surface	Opponent	Score
Loss	0–1	Jun 2025	M15 Oradea, Romania	WTT	Clay	(Romania) Gabriel Ghețu	6–2, 4–6, 3–6
Loss	0–2	Jul 2025	M15 Slobozia, Romania	WTT	Clay	(Moldova) Ilya Snițari	2–6, 6–2, 4–6
Win	1–2	Aug 2025	M15 Curtea de Argeș, Romania	WTT	Clay	(Romania) Radu Mihai Papoe	6–4, 4–6, 6–1
Loss	1–3	Aug 2025	M15 Bucharest, Romania	WTT	Clay	(Romania) Cezar Crețu	6–7^{(4–7)}, 4–6
Win	2–3	Jul 2026	M15 Slobozia, Romania	WTT	Clay	(Ukraine) Oleksandr Ovcharenko	6–1, 6–1

=== Doubles: 18 (7 titles, 11 runner-ups) ===
Finals by surface
Hard (7–8)
Clay (0–3)
Grass (0–0)

Result	W–L	Date	Tournament	Tier	Surface	Partner	Opponents	Score
Win	1–0	May 2025	M15 Bistrița, Romania	WTT	Clay	(Romania) Gabriel Ghețu	(Italy) Enrico Baldisserri (Italy) Noah Perfetti	Walkover
Loss	1–1	May 2025	M25 Satu Mare, Romania	World Tennis Tour	Clay	(Romania) Gabriel Ghețu	(Romania) Cezar Crețu (Romania) Alexandru Cristian Dumitru	4–6, 6–0, [9–11]
Loss	1–2	Jun 2025	M15 Oradea, Romania	World Tennis Tour	Clay	(Romania) Gabriel Ghețu	(Romania) Mihai Alexandru Coman (Poland) Oskar Grzegorzewski	6–2, 2–6, [6–10]
Win	2–2	Aug 2025	M15 Bucharest, Romania	World Tennis Tour	Clay	(Romania) Gabriel Ghețu	(Romania) Ștefan Adrian Andreescu (Romania) Dragoș Nicolae Cazacu	4–6, 6–4, [10–7]
Win	3–2	Jan 2026	M25 Antalya, Turkey	World Tennis Tour	Clay	(Romania) Gabriel Ghețu	(Romania) Alexandru Cristian Dumitru (Cyprus) Eleftherios Neos	6–4, 6–1
Win	4–2	Jun 2026	M25 Bistrița, Romania	World Tennis Tour	Clay	(Romania) Ștefan Horia Haita	(Romania) Gabriel Ghețu (Romania) Robert Guna	6–3, 7–6^{(7–3)}
Win	5–2	Jun 2026	M15 Curtea de Argeș, Romania	World Tennis Tour	Clay	(Romania) Ștefan Horia Haita	(Italy) Vito Dell'Elba (Mexico) Alan Fernando Rubio Fierros	7–6^{(7–4)}, 6–2
Loss	5–3	Jun 2026	M15 Constanța, Romania	World Tennis Tour	Clay	(Romania) Mihai David Haita	(Spain) Valentín González-Galiño (Argentina) Julio César Porras	6–7^{(4–7)}, 1–6
Win	6–3	Jul 2026	M25 Pitești, Romania	World Tennis Tour	Clay	(Romania) Ștefan Horia Haita	(Ukraine) Oleksandr Ovcharenko (Italy) Riccardo Perin	2–6, 6–2, [10–5]
