= 2025 ITF Men's World Tennis Tour (April–June) =

The 2025 ITF Men's World Tennis Tour is the 2025 edition of the second-tier tour for men's professional tennis. It is organised by the International Tennis Federation and is a tier below the ATP Challenger Tour. The ITF Men's World Tennis Tour includes tournaments with prize money ranging from $15,000 to $25,000.

Since 2022, following the Russian invasion of Ukraine the ITF announced that players from Belarus and Russia could still play on the tour but would not be allowed to play under the flag of Belarus or Russia.

== Key ==
M25 tournaments
M15 tournaments

== Month ==
=== April ===
Week of	Tournament	Winner	Runners-up	Semifinalists	Quarterfinalists
April 7	Santa Margherita di Pula, Italy; Clay; M25; Singles and doubles draws	(Belgium) Gauthier Onclin; 6–0, 6–2	(Netherlands) Guy den Ouden	(Netherlands) Max Houkes (Spain) Carlos Sánchez Jover	(Italy) Giovanni Oradini (Switzerland) Dominic Stricker (Italy) Luciano Carraro (Italy) Raúl Brancaccio
April 7	Santa Margherita di Pula, Italy; Clay; M25; Singles and doubles draws	(Italy) Raúl Brancaccio (Spain) Àlex Martínez; 6–3, 7–5	(Japan) Ryuki Matsuda (Japan) Naoki Tajima	(Netherlands) Max Houkes (Spain) Carlos Sánchez Jover	(Italy) Giovanni Oradini (Switzerland) Dominic Stricker (Italy) Luciano Carraro (Italy) Raúl Brancaccio
April 7	Antalya, Turkiye; Clay; M25; Singles and doubles draws	(Croatia) Luka Mikrut; 6–2, 7–5	(Poland) Daniel Michalski	(France) Moïse Kouamé (United Kingdom) Felix Gill	(Ukraine) Oleksii Krutykh; Alexey Vatutin (France) Sean Cuenin (Uzbekistan) Sergey Fomin
April 7	Antalya, Turkiye; Clay; M25; Singles and doubles draws	(Finland) Patrick Kaukovalta (Finland) Eero Vasa; 6–1, 6–3	(Czech Republic) Zdeněk Kolář (Czech Republic) Jakub Nicod	(France) Moïse Kouamé (United Kingdom) Felix Gill	(Ukraine) Oleksii Krutykh; Alexey Vatutin (France) Sean Cuenin (Uzbekistan) Sergey Fomin
April 7	Lu'an, China; Hard; M15; Singles and doubles draws	(China) Te Rigele; 7–6^{(7–5)}, ret.	(South Korea) Shin Woobin	(China) Sun Fajing (China) Xiao Linang	(Poland) Filip Peliwo (China) Jiang Fumin (Australia) Akira Santillan (Northern Mariana Islands) Colin Sinclair
April 7	Lu'an, China; Hard; M15; Singles and doubles draws	(South Korea) Jeong Yeong-seok (South Korea) Park Ui-sung; 6–4, 3–6, [10–8]	(Chinese Taipei) Hsieh Cheng-peng (China) Yang Mingyuan	(China) Sun Fajing (China) Xiao Linang	(Poland) Filip Peliwo (China) Jiang Fumin (Australia) Akira Santillan (Northern Mariana Islands) Colin Sinclair
April 7	Sharm El Sheikh, Egypt; Hard; M15; Singles and doubles draws	(Egypt) Fares Zakaria; 7–5, 6–3	(Egypt) Mohamed Safwat	(Ukraine) Yurii Dzhavakian (Italy) Alexandr Binda	(Germany) Oscar Moraing (Ukraine) Vadym Ursu (United Kingdom) Hamish Stewart (South Africa) Kris van Wyk
April 7	Sharm El Sheikh, Egypt; Hard; M15; Singles and doubles draws	(Egypt) Amr Elsayed (United Kingdom) Hamish Stewart; 3–6, 6–2, [10–8]	(Finland) Vesa Ahti (Serbia) Viktor Jović	(Ukraine) Yurii Dzhavakian (Italy) Alexandr Binda	(Germany) Oscar Moraing (Ukraine) Vadym Ursu (United Kingdom) Hamish Stewart (South Africa) Kris van Wyk
April 7	Monastir, Tunisia; Hard; M15; Singles and doubles draws	(United Kingdom) Giles Hussey; 3–6, 7–6^{(7–2)}, 6–4	(Latvia) Robert Strombachs	(Belgium) Buvaysar Gadamauri (United Kingdom) James Story	(France) Louis Dussin (Spain) Alberto Barroso Campos (Italy) Lorenzo Sciahbasi (France) Arthur Reymond
April 7	Monastir, Tunisia; Hard; M15; Singles and doubles draws	(Belgium) Buvaysar Gadamauri (Greece) Dimitris Sakellaridis; 6–3, 6–3	(Slovakia) Lukáš Pokorný (Latvia) Robert Strombachs	(Belgium) Buvaysar Gadamauri (United Kingdom) James Story	(France) Louis Dussin (Spain) Alberto Barroso Campos (Italy) Lorenzo Sciahbasi (France) Arthur Reymond
April 14	Santa Margherita di Pula, Italy; Clay; M25; Singles and doubles draws	(United Kingdom) Jay Clarke; 4–6, 6–3, 6–4	(France) Arthur Géa	(Italy) Giovanni Fonio (Romania) Nicholas David Ionel	(Belgium) Gauthier Onclin (Italy) Andrea Picchione; Andrey Chepelev (Italy) Federico Iannaccone
April 14	Santa Margherita di Pula, Italy; Clay; M25; Singles and doubles draws	(Czech Republic) Jiří Barnat (Czech Republic) Filip Duda; 6–7^{(1–7)}, 6–4, [10–7]	(Spain) Mario Mansilla Díez (Spain) Bruno Pujol Navarro	(Italy) Giovanni Fonio (Romania) Nicholas David Ionel	(Belgium) Gauthier Onclin (Italy) Andrea Picchione; Andrey Chepelev (Italy) Federico Iannaccone
April 14	Sharm El Sheikh, Egypt; Hard; M25; Singles and doubles draws	(Georgia (country)) Saba Purtseladze; 7–5, 6–4	(Slovakia) Michal Krajčí	(Czech Republic) Marek Gengel (Italy) Lorenzo Rottoli	(United Kingdom) Arthur Fery (Egypt) Amr Elsayed (Turkey) Cem Ilkel (Egypt) Fares Zakaria
April 14	Sharm El Sheikh, Egypt; Hard; M25; Singles and doubles draws	Yaroslav Demin (United Kingdom) Ryan Peniston; 6–2, 3–6, [11–9]	(Czech Republic) David Poljak (United Kingdom) Hamish Stewart	(Czech Republic) Marek Gengel (Italy) Lorenzo Rottoli	(United Kingdom) Arthur Fery (Egypt) Amr Elsayed (Turkey) Cem Ilkel (Egypt) Fares Zakaria
April 14	Osaka, Japan; Hard; M15; Singles and doubles draws	(Chinese Taipei) Huang Tsung-hao; 7–5, 6–3	(Japan) Yuki Mochizuki	(Japan) Yusuke Kusuhara (Japan) Renta Tokuda	(Japan) Hikaru Shiraishi (Japan) Yuta Kawahashi (Japan) Taisei Ichikawa (Japan) Jumpei Yamasaki
April 14	Osaka, Japan; Hard; M15; Singles and doubles draws	(Japan) Yusuke Kusuhara (Japan) Shunsuke Nakagawa; 6–2, 6–3	(Chinese Taipei) Huang Tsung-hao (Chinese Taipei) Wang Kai-I	(Japan) Yusuke Kusuhara (Japan) Renta Tokuda	(Japan) Hikaru Shiraishi (Japan) Yuta Kawahashi (Japan) Taisei Ichikawa (Japan) Jumpei Yamasaki
April 14	Lu'an, China; Hard; M15; Singles and doubles draws	(Thailand) Pawit Sornlaksup; 6–1, 6–3	(Poland) Filip Peliwo	(China) Te Rigele (South Korea) Kim Geun Jun	(Chinese Taipei) Lee Kuan-yi (China) Xiao Linang (Armenia) Daniil Sarksian (China) Zhang Tianhui
April 14	Lu'an, China; Hard; M15; Singles and doubles draws	Aliaksandr Liaonenka; Alexander Zgirovsky; 2–6, 7–5, [10–5]	(Chinese Taipei) Jeffrey Hsu (China) Yang Zijiang	(China) Te Rigele (South Korea) Kim Geun Jun	(Chinese Taipei) Lee Kuan-yi (China) Xiao Linang (Armenia) Daniil Sarksian (China) Zhang Tianhui
April 14	Dubrovnik, Croatia; Clay; M15; Singles and doubles draws	(Croatia) Luka Mikrut; 6–2, 6–4	(Bosnia and Herzegovina) Nerman Fatić	(Poland) Tomasz Berkieta (United States) Dali Blanch	(Spain) Carlos López Montagud; Alexey Zakharov (Spain) Mario González Fernández (Bosnia and Herzegovina) Mirza Bašić
April 14	Dubrovnik, Croatia; Clay; M15; Singles and doubles draws	(Spain) Diego Augusto Barreto Sánchez (United States) Dali Blanch; 6–2, 6–7^{(4–7)}, [10–7]	(Croatia) Nikola Bašić (Croatia) Josip Šimundža	(Poland) Tomasz Berkieta (United States) Dali Blanch	(Spain) Carlos López Montagud; Alexey Zakharov (Spain) Mario González Fernández (Bosnia and Herzegovina) Mirza Bašić
April 14	Antalya, Turkiye; Clay; M15; Singles and doubles draws	(Slovakia) Alex Molčan; 6–1, 3–6, 6–4	(Ukraine) Oleksii Krutykh	(Ukraine) Viacheslav Bielinskyi (Netherlands) Ryan Nijboer	(Austria) Sandro Kopp (Hungary) Attila Boros (Germany) Tom Gentzsch (Germany) Marvin Möller
April 14	Antalya, Turkiye; Clay; M15; Singles and doubles draws	(Germany) John Sperle (Germany) Marlon Vankan; 7–5, 6–1	(Czech Republic) Jan Jermář (Czech Republic) Tadeáš Paroulek	(Ukraine) Viacheslav Bielinskyi (Netherlands) Ryan Nijboer	(Austria) Sandro Kopp (Hungary) Attila Boros (Germany) Tom Gentzsch (Germany) Marvin Möller
April 14	Monastir, Tunisia; Hard; M15; Singles and doubles draws	(France) Dan Added; 6–4, 6–3	(United Kingdom) James Story	(Turkey) Tuncay Duran (Belgium) Buvaysar Gadamauri	(Republic of Ireland) Peter Buldorini (Spain) Alberto Barroso Campos (France) Maxence Beaugé (United States) Ezekiel Clark
April 14	Monastir, Tunisia; Hard; M15; Singles and doubles draws	(France) Maxence Beaugé (France) Adan Freire Da Silva; 3–6, 7–6^{(8–6)}, [12–10]	(Spain) Alberto Barroso Campos (Spain) Ignasi Forcano	(Turkey) Tuncay Duran (Belgium) Buvaysar Gadamauri	(Republic of Ireland) Peter Buldorini (Spain) Alberto Barroso Campos (France) Maxence Beaugé (United States) Ezekiel Clark
April 21	Angers, France; Clay (i); M25; Singles and doubles draws	(France) Arthur Reymond; 2–6, 6–2, 7–6^{(7–3)}	(France) Clément Tabur	(Spain) Sergi Pérez Contri; Nikolay Vylegzhanin	Ivan Gakhov (France) Maxime Chazal (France) Tristan Lamasine (Switzerland) Kilian Feldbausch
April 21	Angers, France; Clay (i); M25; Singles and doubles draws	(Belgium) Simon Beaupain (France) Maxime Chazal; 7–6^{(7–4)}, 3–6, [10–7]	(France) Axel Garcian (France) Tristan Lamasine	(Spain) Sergi Pérez Contri; Nikolay Vylegzhanin	Ivan Gakhov (France) Maxime Chazal (France) Tristan Lamasine (Switzerland) Kilian Feldbausch
April 21	Santa Margherita di Pula, Italy; Clay; M25; Singles and doubles draws	(Italy) Gabriele Piraino; 6–3, 6–4	(Spain) Max Alcalá Gurri	(Italy) Federico Bondioli (Czech Republic) Hynek Bartoň	(United Kingdom) Jay Clarke (France) Laurent Lokoli (France) Arthur Géa (Italy) Facundo Juárez
April 21	Santa Margherita di Pula, Italy; Clay; M25; Singles and doubles draws	(Italy) Giovanni Oradini (Italy) Marcello Serafini; 4–6, 7–6^{(8–6)}, [10–6]	(Japan) Ryuki Matsuda (Japan) Naoki Tajima	(Italy) Federico Bondioli (Czech Republic) Hynek Bartoň	(United Kingdom) Jay Clarke (France) Laurent Lokoli (France) Arthur Géa (Italy) Facundo Juárez
April 21	Sharm El Sheikh, Egypt; Hard; M25; Singles and doubles draws	(Georgia (country)) Saba Purtseladze; 6–2, 7–5	Erik Arutiunian	(Turkey) Cem İlkel (Ukraine) Yurii Dzhavakian	(United Kingdom) Hamish Stewart; Evgenii Tiurnev (Italy) Lorenzo Rottoli (Egypt) Michael Bassem Sobhy
April 21	Sharm El Sheikh, Egypt; Hard; M25; Singles and doubles draws	(United Kingdom) Ben Jones (Estonia) Kristjan Tamm; 6–4, 6–3	Erik Arutiunian; Daniil Ostapenkov	(Turkey) Cem İlkel (Ukraine) Yurii Dzhavakian	(United Kingdom) Hamish Stewart; Evgenii Tiurnev (Italy) Lorenzo Rottoli (Egypt) Michael Bassem Sobhy
April 21	Osaka, Japan; Hard; M15; Singles and doubles draws	(Japan) Shintaro Imai; 6–3, 6–3	(Japan) Yusuke Takahashi	(Japan) Koki Matsuda (Japan) Jumpei Yamasaki	(Japan) Taisei Ichikawa (Japan) Sora Fukuda (Japan) Takuya Kumasaka (Japan) Yusuke Kusuhara
April 21	Osaka, Japan; Hard; M15; Singles and doubles draws	(Japan) Kazuma Kawachi (Japan) Renta Tokuda; 6–4, 6–4	(Japan) Yusuke Kusuhara (Japan) Masakatsu Noguchi	(Japan) Koki Matsuda (Japan) Jumpei Yamasaki	(Japan) Taisei Ichikawa (Japan) Sora Fukuda (Japan) Takuya Kumasaka (Japan) Yusuke Kusuhara
April 21	Lu'an, China; Hard; M15; Singles and doubles draws	Ilya Ivashka; 6–4, 7–5	Egor Agafonov	(South Korea) Shin Sanhui (Morocco) Elliot Benchetrit	(Thailand) Pawit Sornlaksup (Poland) Filip Peliwo (United States) Evan Zhu (Chinese Taipei) Lee Kuan-yi
April 21	Lu'an, China; Hard; M15; Singles and doubles draws	(South Korea) Shin Sanhui (Thailand) Wishaya Trongcharoenchaikul; 6–3, 6–1	(China) Jin Yuquan (China) Li Zekai	(South Korea) Shin Sanhui (Morocco) Elliot Benchetrit	(Thailand) Pawit Sornlaksup (Poland) Filip Peliwo (United States) Evan Zhu (Chinese Taipei) Lee Kuan-yi
April 21	Shymkent, Kazakhstan; Clay; M15; Singles and doubles draws	(France) Sean Cuenin; 6–4, 1–6, 6–1	(Uzbekistan) Sergey Fomin	(Poland) Jasza Szajrych (Ukraine) Aleksandr Braynin	Konstantin Zhzhenov (Kazakhstan) Amir Omarkhanov (Czech Republic) Matyáš Černý; Denis Klok
April 21	Shymkent, Kazakhstan; Clay; M15; Singles and doubles draws	(Uzbekistan) Sergey Fomin; Pavel Verbin; 6–3, 6–3	(Germany) Adrian Oetzbach (Belgium) Martin van der Meerschen	(Poland) Jasza Szajrych (Ukraine) Aleksandr Braynin	Konstantin Zhzhenov (Kazakhstan) Amir Omarkhanov (Czech Republic) Matyáš Černý; Denis Klok
April 21	Sanxenxo, Spain; Hard; M15; Singles and doubles draws	(Sweden) Olle Wallin; 6–1, 6–4	(Spain) Tomás Currás Abasolo	(Spain) Sergio Callejón Hernando (Argentina) Julio César Porras	(Portugal) João Domingues (Denmark) Kane Bonsach Ganley; Pavel Lagutin (France) Antoine Berger
April 21	Sanxenxo, Spain; Hard; M15; Singles and doubles draws	(Spain) Izan Almazán Valiente (Spain) Sergio Callejón Hernando; 6–0, 6–2	(Mexico) Ian Luca Cervantes Tomas (Morocco) Younes Lalami Laaroussi	(Spain) Sergio Callejón Hernando (Argentina) Julio César Porras	(Portugal) João Domingues (Denmark) Kane Bonsach Ganley; Pavel Lagutin (France) Antoine Berger
April 21	Kuršumlijska Banja, Serbia; Clay; M15; Singles and doubles draws	(United States) Dali Blanch; 6–4, 6–2	(Serbia) Kristijan Juhas	(Spain) Diego Augusto Barreto Sánchez (Serbia) Simeon Stanković	(Italy) Niccolò Ciavarella; Semen Pankin (France) Loann Massard (Sweden) Leo Borg
April 21	Kuršumlijska Banja, Serbia; Clay; M15; Singles and doubles draws	(Slovenia) Jan Kupčič (Ukraine) Nikita Mashtakov; 6–2, 6–3	(Spain) Diego Augusto Barreto Sánchez (United States) Dali Blanch	(Spain) Diego Augusto Barreto Sánchez (Serbia) Simeon Stanković	(Italy) Niccolò Ciavarella; Semen Pankin (France) Loann Massard (Sweden) Leo Borg
April 21	Antalya, Turkiye; Clay; M15; Singles and doubles draws	(Slovakia) Alex Molčan; 6–0, 6–2	(Belgium) Gilles-Arnaud Bailly	(Netherlands) Ryan Nijboer (Netherlands) Mees Röttgering	(Germany) John Sperle (Netherlands) Stijn Slump (Germany) Marvin Möller (Germany) Mika Petkovic
April 21	Antalya, Turkiye; Clay; M15; Singles and doubles draws	(Turkey) Gökberk Sarıtaş (Turkey) Mert Naci Türker; Walkover	(Spain) Jose Dominguez Alonso (Spain) Alejandro Turriziani Álvarez	(Netherlands) Ryan Nijboer (Netherlands) Mees Röttgering	(Germany) John Sperle (Netherlands) Stijn Slump (Germany) Marvin Möller (Germany) Mika Petkovic
April 21	Monastir, Tunisia; Hard; M15; Singles and doubles draws	(Poland) Olaf Pieczkowski; 7–5, 6–4	(Turkey) Tuncay Duran	(France) Dan Added (Belgium) Buvaysar Gadamauri	(France) Alexandre Aubriot (Republic of Ireland) Peter Buldorini (United States) Ezekiel Clark (Turkey) Mert Alkaya
April 21	Monastir, Tunisia; Hard; M15; Singles and doubles draws	(Turkey) Mert Alkaya (United Kingdom) Matthew Summers; 6–2, 6–2	(United States) Mwendwa Mbithi (United States) Axel Nefve	(France) Dan Added (Belgium) Buvaysar Gadamauri	(France) Alexandre Aubriot (Republic of Ireland) Peter Buldorini (United States) Ezekiel Clark (Turkey) Mert Alkaya
April 21	Vero Beach, United States; Clay; M15; Singles and doubles draws	(United Kingdom) Blu Baker; 7–6^{(7–3)}, 6–4	(United States) William Grant	(Portugal) Tomas Luis (United States) Ryan Dickerson	(United States) Preston Brown (United States) Jack Kennedy (United States) Andrew Fenty (United States) Keaton Hance
April 21	Vero Beach, United States; Clay; M15; Singles and doubles draws	(Dominican Republic) Peter Bertran (Costa Rica) Jesse Flores; 6–2, 7–5	(United States) Keaton Hance (United States) Jack Kennedy	(Portugal) Tomas Luis (United States) Ryan Dickerson	(United States) Preston Brown (United States) Jack Kennedy (United States) Andrew Fenty (United States) Keaton Hance
April 28	Kunming Open; Anning, China; Clay; M25; Singles and doubles draws	(China) Bai Yan; 6–4, 6–7^{(2–7)}, 6–4	(South Korea) Shin Sanhui	(United States) Jacob Brumm (South Korea) Shin Woobin	Mikalai Haliak (China) Chen Xingdao (Thailand) Wishaya Trongcharoenchaikul (Japan) Yuichiro Inui
April 28	Kunming Open; Anning, China; Clay; M25; Singles and doubles draws	Mikalai Haliak (Chinese Taipei) Lo Yi-jui; 7–6^{(7–1)}, 6–4	(Kazakhstan) Grigoriy Lomakin (Thailand) Wishaya Trongcharoenchaikul	(United States) Jacob Brumm (South Korea) Shin Woobin	Mikalai Haliak (China) Chen Xingdao (Thailand) Wishaya Trongcharoenchaikul (Japan) Yuichiro Inui
April 28	Nottingham, United Kingdom; Hard; M25; Singles and doubles draws	(United Kingdom) George Loffhagen; 6–2, 6–2	(United Kingdom) Charles Broom	(Australia) Bernard Tomic (Canada) Justin Boulais	(United Kingdom) Alastair Gray (Estonia) Daniil Glinka (South Africa) Philip Henning (United States) Andres Martin
April 28	Nottingham, United Kingdom; Hard; M25; Singles and doubles draws	(Canada) Justin Boulais (United States) Andres Martin; 7–6^{(7–4)}, 6–2	(United Kingdom) Charles Broom (United Kingdom) Ben Jones	(Australia) Bernard Tomic (Canada) Justin Boulais	(United Kingdom) Alastair Gray (Estonia) Daniil Glinka (South Africa) Philip Henning (United States) Andres Martin
April 28	Santa Margherita di Pula, Italy; Clay; M25; Singles and doubles draws	(United Kingdom) Paul Jubb; 5–7, 7–6^{(7–2)}, 7–6^{(7–4)}	(Italy) Andrea Guerrieri	(Italy) Lorenzo Carboni (United Kingdom) Jay Clarke	(Germany) Justin Engel (Italy) Francesco Maestrelli (Spain) Carlos Sánchez Jover (Italy) Facundo Juárez
April 28	Santa Margherita di Pula, Italy; Clay; M25; Singles and doubles draws	(Ukraine) Oleksandr Ovcharenko (Spain) Carlos Sánchez Jover; 6–4, 3–6, [10–3]	(India) Chirag Duhan (Argentina) Lautaro Agustín Falabella	(Italy) Lorenzo Carboni (United Kingdom) Jay Clarke	(Germany) Justin Engel (Italy) Francesco Maestrelli (Spain) Carlos Sánchez Jover (Italy) Facundo Juárez
April 28	Sabadell, Spain; Clay; M25; Singles and doubles draws	(Spain) Daniel Mérida; 6–4, 2–6, 7–6^{(7–5)}	(United Kingdom) Oliver Crawford	(Netherlands) Michiel de Krom (Spain) Max Alcalà Gurri	(Spain) Alejo Sánchez Quílez (Spain) Miguel Damas (Italy) Lorenzo Giustino (Germany) Marvin Möller
April 28	Sabadell, Spain; Clay; M25; Singles and doubles draws	(Spain) Bruno Pujol Navarro (Germany) Tim Rühl; 7–5, 6–3	(United States) Sekou Bangoura (Israel) Roy Stepanov	(Netherlands) Michiel de Krom (Spain) Max Alcalà Gurri	(Spain) Alejo Sánchez Quílez (Spain) Miguel Damas (Italy) Lorenzo Giustino (Germany) Marvin Möller
April 28	Shymkent, Kazakhstan; Clay; M15; Singles and doubles draws	Denis Klok; 6–1, 6–4	(Germany) Adrian Oetzbach	(Uzbekistan) Sergey Fomin (Ukraine) Eric Vanshelboim	Bekkhan Atlangeriev (Germany) Kai Wehnelt (Kazakhstan) Amir Omarkhanov (Belgium) Martin Van Der Meerschen
April 28	Shymkent, Kazakhstan; Clay; M15; Singles and doubles draws	(Austria) Gregor Ramskogler (Germany) Kai Wehnelt; 5–7, 6–4, [10–3]	(Uzbekistan) Sergey Fomin; Pavel Verbin	(Uzbekistan) Sergey Fomin (Ukraine) Eric Vanshelboim	Bekkhan Atlangeriev (Germany) Kai Wehnelt (Kazakhstan) Amir Omarkhanov (Belgium) Martin Van Der Meerschen
April 28	Oegstgeest, Netherlands; Clay; M15; Singles and doubles draws	(Belgium) Gilles-Arnaud Bailly; 7–6^{(7–5)}, 6–2	(Spain) David Jordà Sanchis	(Germany) Christoph Negritu (Switzerland) Kilian Feldbausch	(Netherlands) Stijn Slump (Netherlands) Abel Forger (Germany) John Sperle (Netherlands) Brian Bozemoj
April 28	Oegstgeest, Netherlands; Clay; M15; Singles and doubles draws	(Netherlands) Jarno Jans (Netherlands) Niels Visker; 7–6^{(7–4)}, 6–0	(Netherlands) Elgin Khoeblal (Netherlands) Deney Wassermann	(Germany) Christoph Negritu (Switzerland) Kilian Feldbausch	(Netherlands) Stijn Slump (Netherlands) Abel Forger (Germany) John Sperle (Netherlands) Brian Bozemoj
April 28	Kuršumlijska Banja, Serbia; Clay; M15; Singles and doubles draws	(Serbia) Branko Đurić; 6–1, 6–3	(Serbia) Ognjen Milić	Semen Pankin (United States) Dali Blanch	(Australia) Matthew Dellavedova (Bulgaria) Dian Nedev (United States) Alafia Ayeni (Ukraine) Nikita Mashtakov
April 28	Kuršumlijska Banja, Serbia; Clay; M15; Singles and doubles draws	(Italy) Matteo Covato; Semen Pankin; 6–7^{(6–8)}, 6–3, [10–6]	(Bosnia and Herzegovina) Andrej Nedić (Bosnia and Herzegovina) Vladan Tadić	Semen Pankin (United States) Dali Blanch	(Australia) Matthew Dellavedova (Bulgaria) Dian Nedev (United States) Alafia Ayeni (Ukraine) Nikita Mashtakov
April 28	Monastir, Tunisia; Hard; M15; Singles and doubles draws	(Italy) Filippo Moroni; 4–6, 6–1, 6–3	(France) Cyril Vandermeersch	(Tunisia) Aziz Ouakaa (Bulgaria) Anas Mazdrashki	(Brazil) Igor Marcondes (Switzerland) Damien Wenger (Turkey) Mert Alkaya (Greece) Dimitris Sakellaridis
April 28	Monastir, Tunisia; Hard; M15; Singles and doubles draws	(France) Étienne Donnet (Italy) Filippo Moroni; Walkover	(United States) Mwendwa Mbithi (United States) Axel Nefve	(Tunisia) Aziz Ouakaa (Bulgaria) Anas Mazdrashki	(Brazil) Igor Marcondes (Switzerland) Damien Wenger (Turkey) Mert Alkaya (Greece) Dimitris Sakellaridis
April 28	Orange Park, United States; Clay; M15; Singles and doubles draws	(United States) Tyler Zink; 6–3, 7–6^{(7–0)}	(United States) Tristan McCormick	(United States) Jack Kennedy (Portugal) Tomas Luis	(United States) Benjamin Willwerth (Argentina) Bautista Vilicich (United States) Cannon Kingsley (United States) William Grant
April 28	Orange Park, United States; Clay; M15; Singles and doubles draws	(United States) Ryan Dickerson (United States) Ty Gentry; 6–4, 4–6, [12–10]	(United States) Cannon Kingsley (United States) Billy Suarez	(United States) Jack Kennedy (Portugal) Tomas Luis	(United States) Benjamin Willwerth (Argentina) Bautista Vilicich (United States) Cannon Kingsley (United States) William Grant

=== May ===
Week of	Tournament	Winner	Runners-up	Semifinalists	Quarterfinalists
May 5	Baotou, China; Clay (i); M25; Singles and doubles draws	(Australia) Jason Kubler; 6–1, 6–1	(China) Bai Yan	(India) Mukund Sasikumar (Chinese Taipei) Lee Kuan-yi	(Switzerland) Luca Castelnuovo (China) Zhang Tianhui (United States) Jacob Brumm; Mikalai Haliak
May 5	Baotou, China; Clay (i); M25; Singles and doubles draws	(South Korea) Jeong Yeong-seok (South Korea) Park Ui-sung; 6–4, 7–6^{(7–4)}	(China) Jin Yuquan (China) Li Zekai	(India) Mukund Sasikumar (Chinese Taipei) Lee Kuan-yi	(Switzerland) Luca Castelnuovo (China) Zhang Tianhui (United States) Jacob Brumm; Mikalai Haliak
May 5	Kuršumlijska Banja, Serbia; Clay; M25; Singles and doubles draws	(Germany) Marko Topo; 6–1, 3–6, 6–3	(Bosnia and Herzegovina) Andrej Nedić	(France) Clément Tabur (United Kingdom) Oliver Crawford	(Germany) Patrick Zahraj (Bosnia and Herzegovina) Vladan Tadić (Australia) Matthew Dellavedova (France) Robin Bertrand
May 5	Kuršumlijska Banja, Serbia; Clay; M25; Singles and doubles draws	(United States) Sekou Bangoura (Israel) Roy Stepanov; 7–6^{(7–4)}, 2–6, [10–6]	(Czech Republic) Jan Jermář (Serbia) Stefan Latinović	(France) Clément Tabur (United Kingdom) Oliver Crawford	(Germany) Patrick Zahraj (Bosnia and Herzegovina) Vladan Tadić (Australia) Matthew Dellavedova (France) Robin Bertrand
May 5	Santa Margherita di Pula, Italy; Clay; M25; Singles and doubles draws	Ivan Gakhov; 6–1, 6–2	(France) Florent Bax	(Sweden) Leo Borg (Slovakia) Andrej Martin	(Netherlands) Ryan Nijboer (Ukraine) Oleksandr Ovcharenko (Italy) Alexander Weis (United Kingdom) Felix Gill
May 5	Santa Margherita di Pula, Italy; Clay; M25; Singles and doubles draws	(Argentina) Lautaro Agustín Falabella (Ukraine) Oleksandr Ovcharenko; 6–0, 7–6^{(7–4)}	(Argentina) Guido Andreozzi; Daniil Golubev	(Sweden) Leo Borg (Slovakia) Andrej Martin	(Netherlands) Ryan Nijboer (Ukraine) Oleksandr Ovcharenko (Italy) Alexander Weis (United Kingdom) Felix Gill
May 5	Nottingham, United Kingdom; Hard; M25; Singles and doubles draws	(United Kingdom) Charles Broom; 6–4, 6–3	(Italy) Fabrizio Andaloro	(United Kingdom) Alastair Gray (United Kingdom) Giles Hussey	(United States) Andres Martin (United Kingdom) Ewen Lumsden (Italy) Leonardo Rossi (United Kingdom) Henry Searle
May 5	Nottingham, United Kingdom; Hard; M25; Singles and doubles draws	(United Kingdom) Liam Hignett (United Kingdom) James MacKinlay; 6–4, 6–0	(United Kingdom) Finn Murgett (United Kingdom) James Story	(United Kingdom) Alastair Gray (United Kingdom) Giles Hussey	(United States) Andres Martin (United Kingdom) Ewen Lumsden (Italy) Leonardo Rossi (United Kingdom) Henry Searle
May 5	Tehran, Iran; Clay; M15; Singles and doubles draws	(Iran) Ali Yazdani; 6–4, 6–3	(India) Karan Singh	(India) S D Prajwal Dev (Italy) Matteo Covato	(Turkey) Mert Naci Türker; Denis Klok; Saveliy Ivanov; Vardan Manukyan
May 5	Tehran, Iran; Clay; M15; Singles and doubles draws	(India) Dev Javia (India) Karan Singh; 3–6, 6–1, [12–10]	Ivan Denisov (India) Kabir Hans	(India) S D Prajwal Dev (Italy) Matteo Covato	(Turkey) Mert Naci Türker; Denis Klok; Saveliy Ivanov; Vardan Manukyan
May 5	Bistrița, Romania; Clay; M15; Singles and doubles draws	(Romania) Cezar Crețu; 6–3, 7–6^{(7–5)}	(Bulgaria) Petr Nesterov	(Germany) Max Schönhaus (Romania) Gabi Adrian Boitan	(Romania) Filip Cristian Jianu (Italy) Noah Perfetti (Netherlands) Abel Forger (Romania) Mihai Răzvan Marinescu
May 5	Bistrița, Romania; Clay; M15; Singles and doubles draws	(Romania) Gabriel Ghețu (Romania) Radu David Țurcanu; Walkover	(Italy) Enrico Baldisserri (Italy) Noah Perfetti	(Germany) Max Schönhaus (Romania) Gabi Adrian Boitan	(Romania) Filip Cristian Jianu (Italy) Noah Perfetti (Netherlands) Abel Forger (Romania) Mihai Răzvan Marinescu
May 5	Heraklion, Greece; Hard; M15; Singles and doubles draws	(Germany) Louis Wessels; 3–6, 7–5, 6–2	(Greece) Petros Tsitsipas	(United Kingdom) Matthew Summers (Spain) Iván Marrero Curbelo	(Greece) Ioannis Kountourakis (France) Leo Raquillet (Greece) Dimitris Sakellaridis (Australia) Tai Sach
May 5	Heraklion, Greece; Hard; M15; Singles and doubles draws	(Estonia) Kristjan Tamm (Greece) Petros Tsitsipas; 6–2, 6–4	(Australia) Ethan Cook (Australia) Tai Sach	(United Kingdom) Matthew Summers (Spain) Iván Marrero Curbelo	(Greece) Ioannis Kountourakis (France) Leo Raquillet (Greece) Dimitris Sakellaridis (Australia) Tai Sach
May 5	Monastir, Tunisia; Hard; M15; Singles and doubles draws	(France) Raphael Perot; 6–4, 6–1	(Italy) Filippo Moroni	(United States) Miles Jones (United States) Mwendwa Mbithi	Maxim Zhukov (Australia) Thomas Braithwaite (Japan) Naoya Honda (Senegal) Seydina André
May 5	Monastir, Tunisia; Hard; M15; Singles and doubles draws	(Brazil) Gilbert Klier Júnior (Brazil) Igor Marcondes; 7–5, 6–1	(Germany) Nino Ehrenschneider (France) Raphael Perot	(United States) Miles Jones (United States) Mwendwa Mbithi	Maxim Zhukov (Australia) Thomas Braithwaite (Japan) Naoya Honda (Senegal) Seydina André
May 5	Villahermosa, Mexico; Hard (i); M15; Singles and doubles draws	(Canada) Dan Martin; 5–7, 6–2, 6–3	(Mexico) Alex Hernández	(Costa Rica) Jesse Flores (United States) Felix Corwin	(Canada) Juan Carlos Aguilar (Venezuela) Ricardo Rodríguez-Pace (United States) Maxwell McKennon (Mexico) Rodolfo Jauregui Sainz de Rozas
May 5	Villahermosa, Mexico; Hard (i); M15; Singles and doubles draws	(Japan) Kazuma Kawachi (Japan) Masakatsu Noguchi; 7–6^{(7–3)}, 6–3	(Canada) Mikael Arseneault (Canada) Dan Martin	(Costa Rica) Jesse Flores (United States) Felix Corwin	(Canada) Juan Carlos Aguilar (Venezuela) Ricardo Rodríguez-Pace (United States) Maxwell McKennon (Mexico) Rodolfo Jauregui Sainz de Rozas
May 12	Tbilisi, Georgia; Hard; M25; Singles and doubles draws	(United Kingdom) Ryan Peniston; 6–2, 3–6, 6–1	(United States) Martin Damm	(Japan) Kaichi Uchida; Erik Arutiunian	(United Kingdom) Johannus Monday; Petr Bar Biryukov (Estonia) Daniil Glinka (Georgia (country)) Saba Purtseladze
May 12	Tbilisi, Georgia; Hard; M25; Singles and doubles draws	(Georgia (country)) Aleksandre Bakshi (Slovakia) Lukáš Pokorný; 6–2, 6–4	(New Zealand) Ajeet Rai (Japan) Kaichi Uchida	(Japan) Kaichi Uchida; Erik Arutiunian	(United Kingdom) Johannus Monday; Petr Bar Biryukov (Estonia) Daniil Glinka (Georgia (country)) Saba Purtseladze
May 12	Vic, Spain; Clay; M25; Singles and doubles draws	(France) Clément Tabur; 6–4, 7–6^{(7–2)}	(Italy) Lorenzo Giustino	(United Kingdom) Jay Clarke (Spain) Miguel Damas	Svyatoslav Gulin (Germany) Lucas Gerch (Canada) Steven Diez (Spain) Max Alcalá Gurri
May 12	Vic, Spain; Clay; M25; Singles and doubles draws	(Germany) Lucas Gerch (Germany) Tim Handel; 7–5, 6–3	(Spain) Imanol López Morillo (United States) Richard Zusman	(United Kingdom) Jay Clarke (Spain) Miguel Damas	Svyatoslav Gulin (Germany) Lucas Gerch (Canada) Steven Diez (Spain) Max Alcalá Gurri
May 12	Reggio Emilia, Italy; Clay; M25; Singles and doubles draws	(Slovakia) Alex Molčan; 6–2, 6–1	(United Kingdom) Kyle Edmund	(Italy) Federico Iannaccone (Italy) Filippo Speziali	(United Kingdom) Felix Gill (Germany) Justin Schlageter (United Kingdom) Liam Broady (Italy) Tommaso Compagnucci
May 12	Reggio Emilia, Italy; Clay; M25; Singles and doubles draws	(Italy) Tommaso Compagnucci; Kirill Kivattsev; 6–4, 7–5	(Italy) Alexandr Binda (Kazakhstan) Amir Omarkhanov	(Italy) Federico Iannaccone (Italy) Filippo Speziali	(United Kingdom) Felix Gill (Germany) Justin Schlageter (United Kingdom) Liam Broady (Italy) Tommaso Compagnucci
May 12	Pensacola, United States; Clay; M25; Singles and doubles draws	(Ecuador) Andrés Andrade; 6–4, 6–4	(United States) Alex Rybakov	(United States) Tyler Zink (United States) Garrett Johns	(United States) Corey Craig (Romania) Sebastian Gima (Argentina) Alexis Gurmendi (United States) Liam Krall
May 12	Pensacola, United States; Clay; M25; Singles and doubles draws	(Republic of Ireland) Charles Barry (Australia) Joshua Charlton; 7–6^{(7–3)}, 6–7^{(4–7)}, [10–8]	(United States) Garrett Johns (United States) William Woodall	(United States) Tyler Zink (United States) Garrett Johns	(United States) Corey Craig (Romania) Sebastian Gima (Argentina) Alexis Gurmendi (United States) Liam Krall
May 12	Xalapa, Mexico; Hard; M25; Singles and doubles draws	(United States) Stefan Kozlov; 6–7^{(4–7)}, 6–4, 6–4	(Argentina) Santiago Rodríguez Taverna	(Canada) Juan Carlos Aguilar (United States) Maxwell McKennon	(United States) Ezekiel Clark (Turkey) Arda Azkara (United States) Aidan Mayo (Bolivia) Juan Carlos Prado Ángelo
May 12	Xalapa, Mexico; Hard; M25; Singles and doubles draws	(Canada) Juan Carlos Aguilar (United States) Pranav Kumar; 6–3, 7–6^{(7–5)}	(Canada) Mikael Arseneault (United States) Axel Nefve	(Canada) Juan Carlos Aguilar (United States) Maxwell McKennon	(United States) Ezekiel Clark (Turkey) Arda Azkara (United States) Aidan Mayo (Bolivia) Juan Carlos Prado Ángelo
May 12	Lu'an, China; Hard; M15; Singles and doubles draws	(China) Cui Jie; 6–3, 6–3	(South Korea) Shin Woobin	(Japan) Taiyo Yamanaka (China) Wang Aoran	(Japan) Yuta Kikuchi (Czech Republic) Dominik Palán (Chinese Taipei) Huang Tsung-hao (Australia) Jake Delaney
May 12	Lu'an, China; Hard; M15; Singles and doubles draws	(Chinese Taipei) Huang Tsung-hao (South Korea) Park Ui-sung; 6–1, 7–5	(China) Liu Shaoyun (China) Lu Pengyu	(Japan) Taiyo Yamanaka (China) Wang Aoran	(Japan) Yuta Kikuchi (Czech Republic) Dominik Palán (Chinese Taipei) Huang Tsung-hao (Australia) Jake Delaney
May 12	Tehran, Iran; Clay; M15; Singles and doubles draws	(India) Karan Singh; 7–6^{(7–3)}, 6–2	Aleksandr Lobanov	(Italy) Matteo Covato (Iran) Ali Yazdani	(Venezuela) Brandon Pérez; Artur Kukasian (India) S D Prajwal Dev (India) Dev Javia
May 12	Tehran, Iran; Clay; M15; Singles and doubles draws	(India) S D Prajwal Dev (India) Nitin Kumar Sinha; 6–3, 7–6^{(7–3)}	(India) Maan Kesharwani (India) Atharva Sharma	(Italy) Matteo Covato (Iran) Ali Yazdani	(Venezuela) Brandon Pérez; Artur Kukasian (India) S D Prajwal Dev (India) Dev Javia
May 12	Båstad, Sweden; Clay; M15; Singles and doubles draws	(Germany) Tom Gentzsch; 6–4, 6–4	(United States) Karl Poling	(France) Axel Garcian (France) Alexandre Aubriot	(Germany) Adrian Oetzbach (Republic of Ireland) Michael Agwi (Denmark) Sebastian Grundtvig Jørgensen (Sweden) Olle Wallin
May 12	Båstad, Sweden; Clay; M15; Singles and doubles draws	(Romania) Dragoș Nicolae Cazacu (Morocco) Younes Lalami Laaroussi; 0–6, 6–2, [12–10]	(Netherlands) Brian Bozemoj (Netherlands) Stijn Pel	(France) Axel Garcian (France) Alexandre Aubriot	(Germany) Adrian Oetzbach (Republic of Ireland) Michael Agwi (Denmark) Sebastian Grundtvig Jørgensen (Sweden) Olle Wallin
May 12	Szentendre, Hungary; Clay; M15; Singles and doubles draws	(Bulgaria) Ivan Ivanov; 7–5, 6–4	(Hungary) Gergely Madarász	(Czech Republic) Dominik Kellovský (Switzerland) Johan Nikles	(Argentina) Carlos María Zárate (Czech Republic) Jan Kumstát (Hungary) Gábor Hornung (Hungary) Péter Fajta
May 12	Szentendre, Hungary; Clay; M15; Singles and doubles draws	(Spain) Alberto Barroso Campos (Switzerland) Johan Nikles; 7–6^{(8–6)}, 7–6^{(7–5)}	(Czech Republic) Jan Kumstát (Czech Republic) Denis Peták	(Czech Republic) Dominik Kellovský (Switzerland) Johan Nikles	(Argentina) Carlos María Zárate (Czech Republic) Jan Kumstát (Hungary) Gábor Hornung (Hungary) Péter Fajta
May 12	Bucharest, Romania; Clay; M15; Singles and doubles draws	(Bulgaria) Petr Nesterov; 6–4, 6–4	(Romania) Gabi Adrian Boitan	(Ukraine) Oleksandr Ovcharenko (Romania) Radu David Țurcanu	(Iran) Kasra Rahmani (Netherlands) Abel Forger (Romania) Luca Preda (Romania) Ștefan Adrian Andreescu
May 12	Bucharest, Romania; Clay; M15; Singles and doubles draws	(Ukraine) Oleksandr Ovcharenko (Argentina) Juan Pablo Paz; Walkover	(Argentina) Valentín Basel (Argentina) Lautaro Agustín Falabella	(Ukraine) Oleksandr Ovcharenko (Romania) Radu David Țurcanu	(Iran) Kasra Rahmani (Netherlands) Abel Forger (Romania) Luca Preda (Romania) Ștefan Adrian Andreescu
May 12	Prijedor, Bosnia and Herzegovina; Clay; M15; Singles and doubles draws	(Ukraine) Viacheslav Bielinskyi; 7–6^{(7–3)}, 6–2	(Belgium) Jack Logé	(Serbia) Dušan Obradović (Austria) Sebastian Sorger	(Slovenia) Tilen Kovac (Bosnia and Herzegovina) Nemanja Malešević (Germany) Michel Hopp (Bosnia and Herzegovina) Andrej Nedić
May 12	Prijedor, Bosnia and Herzegovina; Clay; M15; Singles and doubles draws	(Ukraine) Viacheslav Bielinskyi (Poland) Jasza Szajrych; 6–4, 6–3	(India) Aryan Lakshmanan (Italy) Gabriele Maria Noce	(Serbia) Dušan Obradović (Austria) Sebastian Sorger	(Slovenia) Tilen Kovac (Bosnia and Herzegovina) Nemanja Malešević (Germany) Michel Hopp (Bosnia and Herzegovina) Andrej Nedić
May 12	Kuršumlijska Banja, Serbia; Clay; M15; Singles and doubles draws	(Czech Republic) Jonáš Forejtek; 6–2, 6–2	(Serbia) Branko Đurić	(Serbia) Simeon Stanković (Morocco) Karim Bennani	(France) Sean Cuenin (Serbia) Nikola Jović (Bulgaria) Yanaki Milev (Germany) Mika Lipp
May 12	Kuršumlijska Banja, Serbia; Clay; M15; Singles and doubles draws	(France) Sean Cuenin (Czech Republic) Jonáš Forejtek; 6–2, 6–2	(Bulgaria) Dinko Dinev (Bulgaria) Dian Nedev	(Serbia) Simeon Stanković (Morocco) Karim Bennani	(France) Sean Cuenin (Serbia) Nikola Jović (Bulgaria) Yanaki Milev (Germany) Mika Lipp
May 12	Heraklion, Greece; Hard; M15; Singles and doubles draws	(France) Lucas Poullain; 6–2, 6–3	(Japan) Ryuki Matsuda	(United States) Alfredo Perez (United Kingdom) Matthew Summers	(Germany) Oscar Moraing (Australia) Pavle Marinkov (Brazil) João Victor Couto Loureiro (Mexico) Rodrigo Alujas
May 12	Heraklion, Greece; Hard; M15; Singles and doubles draws	(Japan) Ryuki Matsuda (Greece) Dimitris Sakellaridis; 6–2, 7–5	(United Kingdom) Stefan Cooper (United Kingdom) Matthew Howse	(United States) Alfredo Perez (United Kingdom) Matthew Summers	(Germany) Oscar Moraing (Australia) Pavle Marinkov (Brazil) João Victor Couto Loureiro (Mexico) Rodrigo Alujas
May 12	Monastir, Tunisia; Hard; M15; Singles and doubles draws	(Brazil) Igor Marcondes; 6–3, 6–1	Maxim Zhukov	(Germany) Nino Ehrenschneider (Spain) Diego Augusto Barreto Sánchez	(France) Enzo Wallart (Spain) Carles Hernández (Italy) Lorenzo Rottoli (Luxembourg) Alex Knaff
May 12	Monastir, Tunisia; Hard; M15; Singles and doubles draws	(Brazil) Gilbert Klier Júnior (Brazil) Igor Marcondes; 7–6^{(11–9)}, 6–3	(Argentina) Mateo Matulovich (Morocco) Yassine Smiej	(Germany) Nino Ehrenschneider (Spain) Diego Augusto Barreto Sánchez	(France) Enzo Wallart (Spain) Carles Hernández (Italy) Lorenzo Rottoli (Luxembourg) Alex Knaff
May 12	Orlando, United States; Clay; M15; Singles and doubles draws	(Canada) Kuang Qing Xu; 7–6^{(7–3)}, 2–6, 6–2	(United States) Victor Lilov	(Morocco) Yassine Dlimi (United States) Evan Bynoe	(Canada) Dan Martin (United States) Jagger Leach (Brazil) João Vítor Gonçalves Ceolin (United States) Ronald Hohmann
May 12	Orlando, United States; Clay; M15; Singles and doubles draws	(Canada) Nicolas Arseneault (Canada) Dan Martin; 6–3, 7–6^{(7–3)}	(United States) Ryan Dickerson (United States) Andrew Fenty	(Morocco) Yassine Dlimi (United States) Evan Bynoe	(Canada) Dan Martin (United States) Jagger Leach (Brazil) João Vítor Gonçalves Ceolin (United States) Ronald Hohmann
May 19	Mataró, Spain; Clay; M25; Singles and doubles draws	(Spain) Bernabé Zapata Miralles; 7–5, 6–4	(Spain) Nikolás Sánchez Izquierdo	(Spain) Miguel Damas (Bulgaria) Iliyan Radulov	(Spain) Alejo Sánchez Quílez (Ukraine) Oleksii Krutykh (Germany) John Sperle (Italy) Lorenzo Giustino
May 19	Mataró, Spain; Clay; M25; Singles and doubles draws	(Czech Republic) David Poljak (Germany) Tim Rühl; 6–2, 7–6^{(7–5)}	(Spain) Miguel Avendaño Cadena (Spain) Luis Llorens Saracho	(Spain) Miguel Damas (Bulgaria) Iliyan Radulov	(Spain) Alejo Sánchez Quílez (Ukraine) Oleksii Krutykh (Germany) John Sperle (Italy) Lorenzo Giustino
May 19	Cervia, Italy; Clay; M25; Singles and doubles draws	(Italy) Jacopo Berrettini; 7–6^{(7–2)}, 6–2	(Italy) Filippo Romano	(Germany) Daniel Masur (Italy) Francesco Forti	(Italy) Gabriele Piraino (Italy) Federico Bondioli (Italy) Giovanni Oradini (Ukraine) Oleksandr Ovcharenko
May 19	Cervia, Italy; Clay; M25; Singles and doubles draws	(Italy) Francesco Forti (Germany) Daniel Masur; 6–7^{(2–7)}, 6–3, [10–7]	(Italy) Federico Bondioli (Italy) Carlo Alberto Caniato	(Germany) Daniel Masur (Italy) Francesco Forti	(Italy) Gabriele Piraino (Italy) Federico Bondioli (Italy) Giovanni Oradini (Ukraine) Oleksandr Ovcharenko
May 19	Bol, Croatia; Clay; M25; Singles and doubles draws	(France) Laurent Lokoli; 6–4, 4–6, 6–4	(Portugal) Tiago Pereira	(France) Dan Added (Slovenia) Bor Artnak	(Czech Republic) Petr Brunclík (Spain) Alberto Barroso Campos; Kirill Kivattsev (Croatia) Nino Serdarušić
May 19	Bol, Croatia; Clay; M25; Singles and doubles draws	(France) Dan Added (Croatia) Nino Serdarušić; 6–1, 6–4	(Spain) Alberto Barroso Campos (Portugal) Tiago Pereira	(France) Dan Added (Slovenia) Bor Artnak	(Czech Republic) Petr Brunclík (Spain) Alberto Barroso Campos; Kirill Kivattsev (Croatia) Nino Serdarušić
May 19	Coquimbo, Chile; Clay; M25; Singles and doubles draws	(Brazil) Pedro Boscardin Dias; 6–3, 6–1	(Argentina) Gonzalo Villanueva	(Chile) Matías Soto (Argentina) Lautaro Midón	(Argentina) Tomas Martinez (Argentina) Luciano Emanuel Ambrogi (Uruguay) Franco Roncadelli (India) Aryan Shah
May 19	Coquimbo, Chile; Clay; M25; Singles and doubles draws	(Uruguay) Joaquín Aguilar Cardozo (Brazil) Wilson Leite; 6–3, 4–6, [10–8]	(Brazil) Igor Gimenez (Brazil) Enzo Kohlmann de Freitas	(Chile) Matías Soto (Argentina) Lautaro Midón	(Argentina) Tomas Martinez (Argentina) Luciano Emanuel Ambrogi (Uruguay) Franco Roncadelli (India) Aryan Shah
May 19	Orlando, United States; Clay; M25; Singles and doubles draws	(Argentina) Renzo Olivo; 3–6, 6–4, 6–3	(United States) Adhithya Ganesan	(Ecuador) Andrés Andrade (Dominican Republic) Roberto Cid Subervi	Martin Borisiouk (United States) Tyler Zink (United States) Patrick Maloney (United States) Bruno Kuzuhara
May 19	Orlando, United States; Clay; M25; Singles and doubles draws	(United States) Keshav Chopra (China) Fnu Nidunjianzan; 2–6, 7–5, [10–8]	(United States) Oren Vasser (Japan) Leo Vithoontien	(Ecuador) Andrés Andrade (Dominican Republic) Roberto Cid Subervi	Martin Borisiouk (United States) Tyler Zink (United States) Patrick Maloney (United States) Bruno Kuzuhara
May 19	Lu'an, China; Hard; M15; Singles and doubles draws	(China) Xiao Linang; 7–6^{(8–6)}, 6–1	(Japan) Kokoro Isomura	(China) Zhang Tianhui (Japan) Taiyo Yamanaka	(Japan) Saki Tange (Japan) Sora Fukuda (China) Lu Pengyu (Japan) Jumpei Yamasaki
May 19	Lu'an, China; Hard; M15; Singles and doubles draws	(China) Liu Shaoyun (China) Lu Pengyu; 6–4, 1–6, [10–8]	(China) Han Xirui (Chinese Taipei) Hsieh Cheng-peng	(China) Zhang Tianhui (Japan) Taiyo Yamanaka	(Japan) Saki Tange (Japan) Sora Fukuda (China) Lu Pengyu (Japan) Jumpei Yamasaki
May 19	Andong, South Korea; Hard; M15; Singles and doubles draws	(South Korea) Kwon Soon-woo; 6–3, 6–1	(South Korea) Shin Sanhui	(Australia) Jake Delaney (South Korea) Nam Ji-sung	(South Korea) Oh Chan-yeong (South Korea) Lee Duck-hee (South Korea) Chung Yun-seong (South Korea) Cho Seung-woo
May 19	Andong, South Korea; Hard; M15; Singles and doubles draws	(South Korea) Chung Yun-seong (South Korea) Kwon Soon-woo; 6–3, 5–7, [10–5]	(South Korea) Chu Seok-hyeon (South Korea) Son Ji-hoon	(Australia) Jake Delaney (South Korea) Nam Ji-sung	(South Korea) Oh Chan-yeong (South Korea) Lee Duck-hee (South Korea) Chung Yun-seong (South Korea) Cho Seung-woo
May 19	Tashkent, Uzbekistan; Hard; M15; Singles and doubles draws	(Japan) Renta Tokuda; 6–7^{(6–8)}, 6–1, 6–1	(India) Karan Singh	(India) Kriish Tyagi (Ukraine) Vladyslav Orlov	Igor Kudriashov (Uzbekistan) Maxim Shin (Italy) Lorenzo Lorusso; Aleksandr Lobanov
May 19	Tashkent, Uzbekistan; Hard; M15; Singles and doubles draws	(Italy) Lorenzo Lorusso (Uzbekistan) Maxim Shin; 6–4, 6–7^{(6–8)}, [10–6]	(India) Ishaque Eqbal (India) Nitin Kumar Sinha	(India) Kriish Tyagi (Ukraine) Vladyslav Orlov	Igor Kudriashov (Uzbekistan) Maxim Shin (Italy) Lorenzo Lorusso; Aleksandr Lobanov
May 19	Kotka, Finland; Clay; M15; Singles and doubles draws	(Germany) Tom Gentzsch; 6–3, 7–5	(Finland) Eero Vasa	(Republic of Ireland) Michael Agwi (Ukraine) Eric Vanshelboim	(Switzerland) Johan Nikles (France) Thomas Faurel (France) Leo Raquillet (Germany) Adrian Oetzbach
May 19	Kotka, Finland; Clay; M15; Singles and doubles draws	(Finland) Patrick Kaukovalta (Finland) Eero Vasa; 4–6, 6–0, [10–8]	(Poland) Alan Bojarski (Poland) Kacper Szymkowiak	(Republic of Ireland) Michael Agwi (Ukraine) Eric Vanshelboim	(Switzerland) Johan Nikles (France) Thomas Faurel (France) Leo Raquillet (Germany) Adrian Oetzbach
May 19	Bucharest, Romania; Clay; M15; Singles and doubles draws	(Romania) Dan Alexandru Tomescu; 4–6, 6–4, 7–5	(Romania) Ștefan Adrian Andreescu	(Romania) Cezar Gabriel Papoe (Romania) Gabriel Ghețu	(Romania) Luca Preda (Czech Republic) Denis Peták (Romania) Ștefan Paloși (Romania) Sebastian Gima
May 19	Bucharest, Romania; Clay; M15; Singles and doubles draws	Mikalai Haliak (Netherlands) Niels Visker; 7–6^{(7–3)}, 6–3	(Netherlands) Manvydas Balciunas (Netherlands) Abel Forger	(Romania) Cezar Gabriel Papoe (Romania) Gabriel Ghețu	(Romania) Luca Preda (Czech Republic) Denis Peták (Romania) Ștefan Paloși (Romania) Sebastian Gima
May 19	Kuršumlijska Banja, Serbia; Clay; M15; Singles and doubles draws	(France) Sean Cuenin; 6–4, 6–0	(Germany) Alen Mujakić	(Bulgaria) Dinko Dinev (United States) Dali Blanch	(Argentina) Lautaro Agustín Falabella (Czech Republic) Jonáš Forejtek (Canada) Benjamin Thomas George (Italy) Pietro Marino
May 19	Kuršumlijska Banja, Serbia; Clay; M15; Singles and doubles draws	(Spain) David Naharro (United States) Michael Zhu; 7–5, 6–7^{(1–7)}, [10–5]	(United States) Dali Blanch (Serbia) Tadija Radovanović	(Bulgaria) Dinko Dinev (United States) Dali Blanch	(Argentina) Lautaro Agustín Falabella (Czech Republic) Jonáš Forejtek (Canada) Benjamin Thomas George (Italy) Pietro Marino
May 19	Brčko, Bosnia and Herzegovina; Clay; M15; Singles and doubles draws	(Serbia) Dušan Obradović; 7–5, 3–6, 6–2	(Ukraine) Viacheslav Bielinskyi	(Poland) Tomasz Berkieta (Italy) Luca Castagnola	(France) Amaury Raynel (Italy) Edoardo Zanada (Belgium) Jack Logé (Germany) Maximilian Homberg
May 19	Brčko, Bosnia and Herzegovina; Clay; M15; Singles and doubles draws	(Ukraine) Viacheslav Bielinskyi (Poland) Jasza Szajrych; 1–6, 6–3, [10–5]	(Poland) Tomasz Berkieta (Italy) Gabriele Maria Noce	(Poland) Tomasz Berkieta (Italy) Luca Castagnola	(France) Amaury Raynel (Italy) Edoardo Zanada (Belgium) Jack Logé (Germany) Maximilian Homberg
May 19	Heraklion, Greece; Hard; M15; Singles and doubles draws	(Australia) Edward Winter; 6–2, 6–2	(France) Antoine Ghibaudo	(United Kingdom) James Story (France) Lucas Poullain	(United States) Alfredo Perez (Italy) Leonardo Rossi (Australia) Marc Polmans (Egypt) Fares Zakaria
May 19	Heraklion, Greece; Hard; M15; Singles and doubles draws	(Australia) Ethan Cook (Portugal) Diogo Marques; 4–6, 6–4, [10–6]	(Estonia) Kristjan Tamm (Greece) Petros Tsitsipas	(United Kingdom) James Story (France) Lucas Poullain	(United States) Alfredo Perez (Italy) Leonardo Rossi (Australia) Marc Polmans (Egypt) Fares Zakaria
May 19	Monastir, Tunisia; Hard; M15; Singles and doubles draws	(Turkey) Tuncay Duran; 6–1, 6–3	(United Kingdom) Ewen Lumsden	(United Kingdom) Millen Hurrion (Brazil) Gilbert Klier Júnior	(Brazil) Igor Marcondes (Egypt) Amr Elsayed (France) Enzo Wallart (Italy) Lorenzo Rottoli
May 19	Monastir, Tunisia; Hard; M15; Singles and doubles draws	(Brazil) Gilbert Klier Júnior (Brazil) Igor Marcondes; Walkover	(Luxembourg) Alex Knaff (United Kingdom) Ewen Lumsden	(United Kingdom) Millen Hurrion (Brazil) Gilbert Klier Júnior	(Brazil) Igor Marcondes (Egypt) Amr Elsayed (France) Enzo Wallart (Italy) Lorenzo Rottoli
May 26	Carnac, France; Clay; M25; Singles and doubles draws	(France) Tristan Lamasine; 6–3, 7–5	(Netherlands) Jelle Sels	Marat Sharipov (France) Florent Bax	(France) Lucas Poullain (France) Alexandre Reco (France) Axel Garcian (France) Pablo Trochu
May 26	Carnac, France; Clay; M25; Singles and doubles draws	(France) Maxence Beaugé (France) Lucas Bouquet; 7–5, 6–4	(France) Felix Balshaw (France) Lucas Marionneau	Marat Sharipov (France) Florent Bax	(France) Lucas Poullain (France) Alexandre Reco (France) Axel Garcian (France) Pablo Trochu
May 26	Satu Mare, Romania; Clay; M25; Singles and doubles draws	(Romania) Gabi Adrian Boitan; 6–4, 6–3	(Spain) Alex Marti Pujolras	(Romania) Ștefan Adrian Andreescu (Ukraine) Oleksandr Ovcharenko	(Romania) Cezar Crețu (Romania) Cezar Gabriel Papoe (Czech Republic) Michael Vrbenský (Germany) Niklas Guttau
May 26	Satu Mare, Romania; Clay; M25; Singles and doubles draws	(Romania) Cezar Crețu (Romania) Alexandru Cristian Dumitru; 6–4, 0–6, [11–9]	(Romania) Gabriel Ghețu (Romania) Radu David Țurcanu	(Romania) Ștefan Adrian Andreescu (Ukraine) Oleksandr Ovcharenko	(Romania) Cezar Crețu (Romania) Cezar Gabriel Papoe (Czech Republic) Michael Vrbenský (Germany) Niklas Guttau
May 26	Bol, Croatia; Clay; M25; Singles and doubles draws	(Germany) Rudolf Molleker; 6–4, 6–7^{(5–7)}, 6–3	(Portugal) Tiago Pereira	(Croatia) Matej Dodig (France) Dan Added	(Croatia) Mili Poljičak (United States) Alafia Ayeni (Slovakia) Alex Molčan (Croatia) Luka Mikrut
May 26	Bol, Croatia; Clay; M25; Singles and doubles draws	(Croatia) Admir Kalender; Pavel Verbin; 3–6, 6–4, [10–6]	(Croatia) Matej Dodig (Croatia) Nino Serdarušić	(Croatia) Matej Dodig (France) Dan Added	(Croatia) Mili Poljičak (United States) Alafia Ayeni (Slovakia) Alex Molčan (Croatia) Luka Mikrut
May 26	Heraklion, Greece; Hard; M25; Singles and doubles draws	(Japan) Ryuki Matsuda; 7–5, 6–2	(Italy) Fabrizio Andaloro	(Greece) Aristotelis Thanos (Australia) Marc Polmans	(Belgium) Tibo Colson (Turkey) Ergi Kırkın (Australia) Edward Winter (Australia) Tai Sach
May 26	Heraklion, Greece; Hard; M25; Singles and doubles draws	(Australia) Ethan Cook (Portugal) Diogo Marques; 6–2, 6–0	(Australia) Edward Winter (Australia) Hugh Winter	(Greece) Aristotelis Thanos (Australia) Marc Polmans	(Belgium) Tibo Colson (Turkey) Ergi Kırkın (Australia) Edward Winter (Australia) Tai Sach
May 26	Coquimbo, Chile; Clay; M25; Singles and doubles draws	(Brazil) João Lucas Reis da Silva; 6–2, 7–6^{(8–6)}	(Argentina) Luciano Emanuel Ambrogi	(India) Aryan Shah (Argentina) Gonzalo Villanueva	(Argentina) Thiago Cigarran (Brazil) Enzo Kohlmann de Freitas (Brazil) Pedro Boscardin Dias (Argentina) Lautaro Midón
May 26	Coquimbo, Chile; Clay; M25; Singles and doubles draws	(Uruguay) Joaquín Aguilar Cardozo (Argentina) Santiago de la Fuente; 4–6, 7–5, [10–4]	(Chile) Ignacio Antonio Becerra Otárola (Chile) Daniel Antonio Núñez	(India) Aryan Shah (Argentina) Gonzalo Villanueva	(Argentina) Thiago Cigarran (Brazil) Enzo Kohlmann de Freitas (Brazil) Pedro Boscardin Dias (Argentina) Lautaro Midón
May 26	Daegu, South Korea; Hard; M15; Singles and doubles draws	(South Korea) Nam Ji-sung; 6–1, 6–2	(South Korea) Park Ui-sung	(South Korea) Lee Jea-moon (South Korea) Chu Seok-hyeon	(Thailand) Thanapet Chanta (South Korea) Shin Sanhui (Thailand) Pawit Sornlaksup (Japan) Yuki Mochizuki
May 26	Daegu, South Korea; Hard; M15; Singles and doubles draws	(Japan) Yusuke Kusuhara (Japan) Shunsuke Nakagawa; 6–3, 6–4	(South Korea) Kwon Soon-woo (South Korea) Park Ui-sung	(South Korea) Lee Jea-moon (South Korea) Chu Seok-hyeon	(Thailand) Thanapet Chanta (South Korea) Shin Sanhui (Thailand) Pawit Sornlaksup (Japan) Yuki Mochizuki
May 26	Lu'an, China; Hard; M15; Singles and doubles draws	(China) Cui Jie; 5–7, 6–3, 7–5	(China) Bai Yan	(China) Zheng Yaojie (Japan) Daisuke Sumizawa	(Malaysia) Mitsuki Wei Kang Leong (Chinese Taipei) Huang Tsung-hao (Japan) Taiyo Yamanaka (Thailand) Wishaya Trongcharoenchaikul
May 26	Lu'an, China; Hard; M15; Singles and doubles draws	(United States) Jordan Chiu (Chinese Taipei) Lo Yi-jui; 7–6^{(7–2)}, 6–7^{(8–10)}, [10–7]	(China) Zheng Yaojie (China) Zheng Zhan	(China) Zheng Yaojie (Japan) Daisuke Sumizawa	(Malaysia) Mitsuki Wei Kang Leong (Chinese Taipei) Huang Tsung-hao (Japan) Taiyo Yamanaka (Thailand) Wishaya Trongcharoenchaikul
May 26	Tashkent, Uzbekistan; Hard; M15; Singles and doubles draws	(Japan) Renta Tokuda; 6–4, 6–3	(Uzbekistan) Maxim Shin	(Uzbekistan) Sergey Fomin (Italy) Lorenzo Lorusso	Anton Chekhov (India) Kriish Tyagi (Uzbekistan) Amir Milushev (India) Madhwin Kamath
May 26	Tashkent, Uzbekistan; Hard; M15; Singles and doubles draws	(Uzbekistan) Sergey Fomin (Ukraine) Vladyslav Orlov; 6–2, 6–4	(India) Ishaque Eqbal (India) Nitin Kumar Sinha	(Uzbekistan) Sergey Fomin (Italy) Lorenzo Lorusso	Anton Chekhov (India) Kriish Tyagi (Uzbekistan) Amir Milushev (India) Madhwin Kamath
May 26	Tsaghkadzor, Armenia; Clay; M15; Singles and doubles draws	(Italy) Alexandr Binda; 7–6^{(7–5)}, 2–6, 6–4	Evgenii Tiurnev	Aleksandr Lobanov (Italy) Lorenzo Bocchi	(Netherlands) Daniël Verbeek; Artur Kukasian (Italy) Juan Cruz Martin Manzano; Artem Bogomolov
May 26	Tsaghkadzor, Armenia; Clay; M15; Singles and doubles draws	Aleksandr Lobanov; Konstantin Zhzhenov; 4–6, 6–3, [11–9]	Artur Kukasian (Italy) Juan Cruz Martin Manzano	Aleksandr Lobanov (Italy) Lorenzo Bocchi	(Netherlands) Daniël Verbeek; Artur Kukasian (Italy) Juan Cruz Martin Manzano; Artem Bogomolov
May 26	La Nucia, Spain; Clay; M15; Singles and doubles draws	(Bulgaria) Iliyan Radulov; 6–1, 2–6, 7–6^{(7–5)}	(Spain) Alejo Sánchez Quílez	(Spain) Daniel Mérida (Spain) Miguel Damas	(Spain) Sergi Pérez Contri (Ukraine) Eric Vanshelboim (Spain) Diego Augusto Barreto Sanchez; Svyatoslav Gulin
May 26	La Nucia, Spain; Clay; M15; Singles and doubles draws	(Mexico) Rafael de Alba (Mexico) Alan Raúl Sau Franco; 6–4, 4–6, [10–6]	(Spain) Álvaro Bueno Gil (Spain) Ignasi Forcano	(Spain) Daniel Mérida (Spain) Miguel Damas	(Spain) Sergi Pérez Contri (Ukraine) Eric Vanshelboim (Spain) Diego Augusto Barreto Sanchez; Svyatoslav Gulin
May 26	Villach, Austria; Clay; M15; Singles and doubles draws	(Argentina) Alex Barrena; 6–3, 6–3	(Germany) Diego Dedura	(Slovakia) Miloš Karol (Germany) Tim Handel	(Austria) Matthias Ujvary (Italy) Giacomo Crisostomo (Austria) Maximilian Neuchrist (Brazil) João Eduardo Schiessl
May 26	Villach, Austria; Clay; M15; Singles and doubles draws	(Switzerland) Arthur Laborde (Austria) Maximilian Neuchrist; 6–7^{(1–7)}, 6–3, [10–2]	(Germany) Jeremy Schifris (Italy) Leonardo Taddia	(Slovakia) Miloš Karol (Germany) Tim Handel	(Austria) Matthias Ujvary (Italy) Giacomo Crisostomo (Austria) Maximilian Neuchrist (Brazil) João Eduardo Schiessl
May 26	Gyula, Hungary; Clay; M15; Singles and doubles draws	(Hungary) Péter Fajta; 6–3, 6–4	(France) Leo Raquillet	(Czech Republic) Matthew William Donald (Poland) Karol Filar	(Hungary) Máté Valkusz (Czech Republic) Tadeáš Paroulek (Brazil) Paulo André Saraiva dos Santos (Austria) Gregor Ramskogler
May 26	Gyula, Hungary; Clay; M15; Singles and doubles draws	(Hungary) Matyas Fuele (Hungary) Gergely Madarász; 4–6, 6–4, [12–10]	(Hungary) Patrik Meszaros (Hungary) Zsombor Velcz	(Czech Republic) Matthew William Donald (Poland) Karol Filar	(Hungary) Máté Valkusz (Czech Republic) Tadeáš Paroulek (Brazil) Paulo André Saraiva dos Santos (Austria) Gregor Ramskogler
May 26	Kuršumlijska Banja, Serbia; Clay; M15; Singles and doubles draws	(Italy) Tommaso Compagnucci; 6–1 ret.	(Serbia) Kristijan Juhas	(Morocco) Younes Lalami Laaroussi (Switzerland) Damien Wenger	(France) Arthur Reymond (Argentina) Lautaro Agustín Falabella (United States) Dali Blanch (Romania) Dragoș Nicolae Cazacu
May 26	Kuršumlijska Banja, Serbia; Clay; M15; Singles and doubles draws	(Morocco) Younes Lalami Laaroussi (Switzerland) Damien Wenger; 6–4, 6–2	(Serbia) Aleksa Pisarić (Serbia) Vuk Radjenovic	(Morocco) Younes Lalami Laaroussi (Switzerland) Damien Wenger	(France) Arthur Reymond (Argentina) Lautaro Agustín Falabella (United States) Dali Blanch (Romania) Dragoș Nicolae Cazacu
May 26	Doboj, Bosnia and Herzegovina; Clay; M15; Singles and doubles draws	(Bosnia and Herzegovina) Andrej Nedić; 6–1, 6–3	(Ukraine) Tymur Bieldiugin	(Czech Republic) Dominik Kellovský (Slovenia) Sebastian Dominko	(Croatia) Nikola Bašić (Belgium) Emilien Demanet (Italy) Carlo Alberto Caniato (Bosnia and Herzegovina) Vladan Tadić
May 26	Doboj, Bosnia and Herzegovina; Clay; M15; Singles and doubles draws	(Bosnia and Herzegovina) Andrej Nedić (Bosnia and Herzegovina) Vladan Tadić; 6–3, 3–6, [10–5]	(Sweden) John Hallquist Lithén (Sweden) Oliver Johansson	(Czech Republic) Dominik Kellovský (Slovenia) Sebastian Dominko	(Croatia) Nikola Bašić (Belgium) Emilien Demanet (Italy) Carlo Alberto Caniato (Bosnia and Herzegovina) Vladan Tadić
May 26	Kayseri, Turkiye; Hard; M15; Singles and doubles draws	(Turkey) Arda Azkara; 7–6^{(7–5)}, 3–6, 6–3	(Switzerland) Luca Castelnuovo	(Netherlands) Daniel de Jonge (France) Constantin Bittoun Kouzmine	(United Kingdom) Finn Murgett (Bulgaria) Georgi Georgiev (United Kingdom) William Jansen (Italy) Filippo Moroni
May 26	Kayseri, Turkiye; Hard; M15; Singles and doubles draws	(Turkey) Arda Azkara (United Kingdom) Joe Tyler; 6–3, 7–6^{(7–3)}	(France) Constantin Bittoun Kouzmine (Germany) Niklas Schell	(Netherlands) Daniel de Jonge (France) Constantin Bittoun Kouzmine	(United Kingdom) Finn Murgett (Bulgaria) Georgi Georgiev (United Kingdom) William Jansen (Italy) Filippo Moroni
May 26	Monastir, Tunisia; Hard; M15; Singles and doubles draws	(Tunisia) Moez Echargui; 6–1, 6–1	(Turkey) Mert Alkaya	(United Kingdom) Ewen Lumsden (Turkey) Yankı Erel	(Portugal) Pedro Araújo (Turkey) Tuncay Duran (United Kingdom) Matthew Rankin (France) Pierre Delage
May 26	Monastir, Tunisia; Hard; M15; Singles and doubles draws	(Portugal) Pedro Araújo (United Kingdom) Ewen Lumsden; Walkover	(New Zealand) Jack Loutit (United Kingdom) Matthew Rankin	(United Kingdom) Ewen Lumsden (Turkey) Yankı Erel	(Portugal) Pedro Araújo (Turkey) Tuncay Duran (United Kingdom) Matthew Rankin (France) Pierre Delage
May 26	San Diego, United States; Hard; M15; Singles and doubles draws	(United States) Keegan Smith; 6–2, 6–3	Savriyan Danilov	(Canada) Jaden Weekes (United States) Rohan Murali	(United States) Lucca Liu (United States) Noah Schachter (United States) Nathan Ponwith (United States) Ezekiel Clark
May 26	San Diego, United States; Hard; M15; Singles and doubles draws	(United Kingdom) Finn Bass (Australia) Matt Hulme; 6–4, 7–5	(Mexico) Daniel Moreno (Mexico) Manuel Sánchez	(Canada) Jaden Weekes (United States) Rohan Murali	(United States) Lucca Liu (United States) Noah Schachter (United States) Nathan Ponwith (United States) Ezekiel Clark

=== June ===
Week of	Tournament	Winner	Runners-up	Semifinalists	Quarterfinalists
June 2	Changwon, South Korea; Hard; M25; Singles and doubles draws	(South Korea) Kwon Soon-woo; 6–1, 6–2	(South Korea) Shin Sanhui	(South Korea) Chung Yun-seong (Japan) Yuki Mochizuki	(South Korea) Shin Woobin (United States) Evan Zhu (South Korea) Park Ui-sung (Japan) Yuta Kikuchi
June 2	Changwon, South Korea; Hard; M25; Singles and doubles draws	(South Korea) Chung Hong (South Korea) Son Ji-hoon; 6–4, 6–2	(South Korea) Jeong Yeong-seok (South Korea) Park Ui-sung	(South Korea) Chung Yun-seong (Japan) Yuki Mochizuki	(South Korea) Shin Woobin (United States) Evan Zhu (South Korea) Park Ui-sung (Japan) Yuta Kikuchi
June 2	Córdoba, Spain; Clay; M25; Singles and doubles draws	(Italy) Jacopo Berrettini; 4–6, 7–6^{(7–2)}, 6–4	(Italy) Raúl Brancaccio	(Spain) Alejandro Manzanera Pertusa (Bulgaria) Iliyan Radulov	(Finland) Eero Vasa (Argentina) Julio César Porras (Spain) David Jordà Sanchis (Spain) Albert Pedrico Kravtsov
June 2	Córdoba, Spain; Clay; M25; Singles and doubles draws	(Spain) Mario Mansilla Díez (Spain) Bruno Pujol Navarro; 6–1, 7–5	(Finland) Patrick Kaukovalta (Finland) Eero Vasa	(Spain) Alejandro Manzanera Pertusa (Bulgaria) Iliyan Radulov	(Finland) Eero Vasa (Argentina) Julio César Porras (Spain) David Jordà Sanchis (Spain) Albert Pedrico Kravtsov
June 2	Grasse, France; Clay; M25; Singles and doubles draws	(Belgium) Kimmer Coppejans; 7–5, 6–3	(Argentina) Alex Barrena	(Belgium) Gilles-Arnaud Bailly; Nikolay Vylegzhanin	(France) Maé Malige (France) Raphael Perot (Netherlands) Jelle Sels (France) Dan Added
June 2	Grasse, France; Clay; M25; Singles and doubles draws	(France) Dan Added (France) Arthur Reymond; 6–1, 6–4	(Italy) Simone Agostini (India) Parikshit Somani	(Belgium) Gilles-Arnaud Bailly; Nikolay Vylegzhanin	(France) Maé Malige (France) Raphael Perot (Netherlands) Jelle Sels (France) Dan Added
June 2	Belgrade, Serbia; Clay; M25; Singles and doubles draws	(Italy) Franco Agamenone; 7–6^{(7–4)}, 6–4	(Ukraine) Eric Vanshelboim	(Czech Republic) Tadeáš Paroulek (Argentina) Lorenzo Gagliardo	(France) Lilian Marmousez; Denis Klok (Serbia) Branko Đurić (United Kingdom) Felix Gill
June 2	Belgrade, Serbia; Clay; M25; Singles and doubles draws	(Serbia) Stefan Latinović (Serbia) Vuk Radjenovic; 6–0, 6–3	(Sweden) Erik Grevelius (Sweden) Adam Heinonen	(Czech Republic) Tadeáš Paroulek (Argentina) Lorenzo Gagliardo	(France) Lilian Marmousez; Denis Klok (Serbia) Branko Đurić (United Kingdom) Felix Gill
June 2	Monastir, Tunisia; Hard; M25; Singles and doubles draws	(Tunisia) Moez Echargui; 6–3, 6–4	(Portugal) Tiago Pereira	(France) Robin Catry (Spain) Iñaki Montes de la Torre	(Canada) Sasha Rozin (United Kingdom) Liam Broady (France) Robin Bertrand; Petr Bar Biryukov
June 2	Monastir, Tunisia; Hard; M25; Singles and doubles draws	(Spain) Iñaki Montes de la Torre (Portugal) Tiago Pereira; 6–7^{(5–7)}, 6–3, [10–8]	(Poland) Szymon Kielan (Poland) Filip Pieczonka	(France) Robin Catry (Spain) Iñaki Montes de la Torre	(Canada) Sasha Rozin (United Kingdom) Liam Broady (France) Robin Bertrand; Petr Bar Biryukov
June 2	Santo Domingo, Dominican Republic; Hard; M25; Singles and doubles draws	(Dominican Republic) Roberto Cid Subervi; 6–2, 6–2	(Canada) Nicolas Arseneault	(United States) Mwendwa Mbithi (India) Aryan Shah	(Canada) Mikael Arseneault (Dominican Republic) Peter Bertran (Mexico) Alan Fernando Rubio Fierros (Morocco) Taha Baadi
June 2	Santo Domingo, Dominican Republic; Hard; M25; Singles and doubles draws	(Brazil) Lucas Andrade da Silva (Brazil) Lucca Pignaton; 6–4, 6–4	(Mexico) Luis Carlos Álvarez (Mexico) Alex Hernández	(United States) Mwendwa Mbithi (India) Aryan Shah	(Canada) Mikael Arseneault (Dominican Republic) Peter Bertran (Mexico) Alan Fernando Rubio Fierros (Morocco) Taha Baadi
June 2	Karuizawa, Japan; Clay; M15; Singles and doubles draws	(Japan) Sora Fukuda; 6–4, 6–2	(Japan) Yuta Kawahashi	(Australia) Jake Delaney (Japan) Yuto Oki	(Japan) Ko Suzuki (Japan) Shu Matsuoka (Japan) Jumpei Yamasaki (Japan) Hikaru Shiraishi
June 2	Karuizawa, Japan; Clay; M15; Singles and doubles draws	(Japan) Yuhei Kono (Japan) Yu Tanaka; 7–5, 7–6^{(7–2)}	(Japan) Kazuma Kawachi (Japan) Yamato Sueoka	(Australia) Jake Delaney (Japan) Yuto Oki	(Japan) Ko Suzuki (Japan) Shu Matsuoka (Japan) Jumpei Yamasaki (Japan) Hikaru Shiraishi
June 2	Lu'an, China; Hard; M155; Singles and doubles draws	(China) Te Rigele; 6–1, 6–4	(Chinese Taipei) Huang Tsung-hao	(Thailand) Wishaya Trongcharoenchaikul (China) Sun Qian	(China) Bai Yan (China) Xiao Linang (United States) Nick Chappell (Canada) Emiliano Jorquera
June 2	Lu'an, China; Hard; M155; Singles and doubles draws	(Chinese Taipei) Huang Tsung-hao (Chinese Taipei) Lai Chin Kuan; 6–3, 6–1	(China) Sun Qian (China) Yang Mingyuan	(Thailand) Wishaya Trongcharoenchaikul (China) Sun Qian	(China) Bai Yan (China) Xiao Linang (United States) Nick Chappell (Canada) Emiliano Jorquera
June 2	Tsaghkadzor, Armenia; Clay; M15; Singles and doubles draws	Evgenii Tiurnev; 6–4, 7–6^{(7–3)}	Ruslan Tiukaev	(Italy) Juan Cruz Martin Manzano; Aleksandr Lobanov	(Italy) Marco Furlanetto (France) Samuel Brosset (Italy) Lorenzo Bocchi (Ukraine) Nikita Mashtakov
June 2	Tsaghkadzor, Armenia; Clay; M15; Singles and doubles draws	(Italy) Juan Cruz Martin Manzano (Argentina) Juan Bautista Otegui; 0–6, 6–4, [10–5]	Artur Kukasian (United States) Tristan Stringer	(Italy) Juan Cruz Martin Manzano; Aleksandr Lobanov	(Italy) Marco Furlanetto (France) Samuel Brosset (Italy) Lorenzo Bocchi (Ukraine) Nikita Mashtakov
June 2	Caltanissetta, Italy; Clay; M15; Singles and doubles draws	(Italy) Manuel Mazza; 6–2, 6–4	(Italy) Gianmarco Ferrari	(Germany) Adrian Oetzbach (Italy) Filippo Romano	(Italy) Fausto Tabacco (Italy) Andrea Paolini (Italy) Samuele Pieri (Italy) Luca Potenza
June 2	Caltanissetta, Italy; Clay; M15; Singles and doubles draws	(Germany) Adrian Oetzbach (Germany) Kai Wehnelt; 6–7^{(2–7)}, 7–6^{(7–2)}, [10–7]	(Italy) Alessandro Coccioli (Italy) Lorenzo Lorusso	(Germany) Adrian Oetzbach (Italy) Filippo Romano	(Italy) Fausto Tabacco (Italy) Andrea Paolini (Italy) Samuele Pieri (Italy) Luca Potenza
June 2	Klagenfurt, Austria; Clay; M15; Singles and doubles draws	(Italy) Francesco Forti; 2–6, 6–3, 6–4	(Germany) Sebastian Prechtel	(Netherlands) Mees Röttgering (Italy) Alessandro Pecci	(Austria) Maximilian Neuchrist (Switzerland) Jeffrey von der Schulenburg (Germany) Justin Schlageter (Austria) Matthias Ujvary
June 2	Klagenfurt, Austria; Clay; M15; Singles and doubles draws	(Czech Republic) Dominik Reček (Czech Republic) Daniel Siniakov; 7–6^{(7–2)}, 7–6^{(7–5)}	(Switzerland) Arthur Laborde (Austria) Maximilian Neuchrist	(Netherlands) Mees Röttgering (Italy) Alessandro Pecci	(Austria) Maximilian Neuchrist (Switzerland) Jeffrey von der Schulenburg (Germany) Justin Schlageter (Austria) Matthias Ujvary
June 2	Ljubljana, Slovenia; Clay; M15; Singles and doubles draws	(Italy) Andrea Guerrieri; 6–0, 4–6, 6–3	(Romania) Sebastian Gima	(Slovenia) Bor Artnak (France) Théo Papamalamis	(Belgium) Émilien Demanet (South Africa) Alec Beckley (Argentina) Valentín Basel (Italy) Pietro Orlando Fellin
June 2	Ljubljana, Slovenia; Clay; M15; Singles and doubles draws	(Slovenia) Jan Kupčič (Slovenia) Žiga Šeško; 6–3, 6–3	(France) Théo Papamalamis (Ukraine) Glib Sekachov	(Slovenia) Bor Artnak (France) Théo Papamalamis	(Belgium) Émilien Demanet (South Africa) Alec Beckley (Argentina) Valentín Basel (Italy) Pietro Orlando Fellin
June 2	Kayseri, Turkiye; Hard; M15; Singles and doubles draws	(United States) Maxwell McKennon; 7–5, 6–1	(Iran) Ali Yazdani	(Netherlands) Daniel de Jonge (Germany) Niklas Schell	(United Kingdom) James Beaven (Bulgaria) Dinko Dinev (Colombia) Samuel Alejandro Linde Palacios (France) Constantin Bittoun Kouzmine
June 2	Kayseri, Turkiye; Hard; M15; Singles and doubles draws	(United Kingdom) Peter Alam (United Kingdom) Hamish Stewart; 6–7^{(2–7)}, 7–5, [10–5]	(France) Constantin Bittoun Kouzmine (United States) Axel Nefve	(Netherlands) Daniel de Jonge (Germany) Niklas Schell	(United Kingdom) James Beaven (Bulgaria) Dinko Dinev (Colombia) Samuel Alejandro Linde Palacios (France) Constantin Bittoun Kouzmine
June 2	Monastir, Tunisia; Hard; M15; Singles and doubles draws	(Italy) Leonardo Rossi; 2–6, 7–6^{(7–5)}, 6–1	(Turkey) Yankı Erel	(Spain) Roger Pascual Ferrà (France) Nicolas Jadoun	(Canada) Keegan Rice (Chile) Diego Fernández Flores (Egypt) Fares Zakaria (France) Nicolas Tepmahc
June 2	Monastir, Tunisia; Hard; M15; Singles and doubles draws	(Portugal) Rodrigo Fernandes (Portugal) Tiago Silva; 7–6^{(7–5)}, 6–3	(United Kingdom) Alexis Canter (United Kingdom) Marcus Walters	(Spain) Roger Pascual Ferrà (France) Nicolas Jadoun	(Canada) Keegan Rice (Chile) Diego Fernández Flores (Egypt) Fares Zakaria (France) Nicolas Tepmahc
June 2	San Diego, United States; Hard; M15; Singles and doubles draws	(United Kingdom) Oliver Tarvet; 6–0, 6–0	(Japan) Leo Vithoontien	(United States) Andrew Fenty (United States) Alexander Kotzen	(United States) Keegan Smith (United States) Tyler Stice (United States) Max Sheldon (United States) Phillip Jordan
June 2	San Diego, United States; Hard; M15; Singles and doubles draws	(United States) Keshav Chopra (United States) Phillip Jordan; 6–3, 7–6^{(7–5)}	(United States) Matt Kuhar (Japan) Leo Vithoontien	(United States) Andrew Fenty (United States) Alexander Kotzen	(United States) Keegan Smith (United States) Tyler Stice (United States) Max Sheldon (United States) Phillip Jordan
June 9	Martos, Spain; Hard; M25; Singles and doubles draws	(United States) Darwin Blanch; 7–6^{(7–4)}, 6–3	(France) Clément Chidekh	(Spain) Alberto Barroso Campos (Spain) Alejo Sánchez Quílez	(Spain) Alejandro Turriziani Álvarez (Spain) Sergi Pérez Contri (Spain) Mario Martínez Serrano (France) Robin Bertrand
June 9	Martos, Spain; Hard; M25; Singles and doubles draws	(France) Clément Chidekh (United Kingdom) Mark Whitehouse; 4–6, 6–2, [10–8]	(France) Robin Bertrand (Spain) John Echeverria	(Spain) Alberto Barroso Campos (Spain) Alejo Sánchez Quílez	(Spain) Alejandro Turriziani Álvarez (Spain) Sergi Pérez Contri (Spain) Mario Martínez Serrano (France) Robin Bertrand
June 9	Villeneuve-Loubet, France; Clay; M25; Singles and doubles draws	(Switzerland) Rémy Bertola; 7–6^{(7–3)}, 6–1	(Italy) Lorenzo Giustino	(France) Lucas Bouquet (France) Thomas Deschamps	(France) Laurent Lokoli (France) Maxence Beaugé (Belgium) Buvaysar Gadamauri; Kirill Kivattsev
June 9	Villeneuve-Loubet, France; Clay; M25; Singles and doubles draws	(Guadeloupe) Oscar Lacides (France) Tristan Lamasine; 7–6^{(7–2)}, 6–4	(Belgium) Buvaysar Gadamauri (Greece) Dimitris Sakellaridis	(France) Lucas Bouquet (France) Thomas Deschamps	(France) Laurent Lokoli (France) Maxence Beaugé (Belgium) Buvaysar Gadamauri; Kirill Kivattsev
June 9	Värnamo, Sweden; Clay; M25; Singles and doubles draws	(Greece) Aristotelis Thanos; 6–4, 7–6^{(7–3)}	(Sweden) Mikael Ymer	(Slovenia) Filip Jeff Planinšek (Sweden) Olle Wallin	(Belgium) Kimmer Coppejans (Finland) Eero Vasa (Spain) David Jordà Sanchis (Sweden) Leo Borg
June 9	Värnamo, Sweden; Clay; M25; Singles and doubles draws	(Finland) Patrick Kaukovalta (Finland) Eero Vasa; 6–3, 6–2	(Sweden) Adam Heinonen (Ukraine) Eric Vanshelboim	(Slovenia) Filip Jeff Planinšek (Sweden) Olle Wallin	(Belgium) Kimmer Coppejans (Finland) Eero Vasa (Spain) David Jordà Sanchis (Sweden) Leo Borg
June 9	Česká Lípa, Czechia; Clay; M25; Singles and doubles draws	(Czech Republic) Jakub Nicod; 7–5, 6–1	(South Africa) Alec Beckley	(Czech Republic) Petr Brunclík (Germany) Louis Wessels	(Czech Republic) Matyáš Černý (Brazil) José Pereira (Germany) Christian Djonov (Czech Republic) Martin Krumich
June 9	Česká Lípa, Czechia; Clay; M25; Singles and doubles draws	(Ukraine) Vladyslav Orlov (Italy) Filippo Romano; 7–6^{(7–4)}, 6–1	(Czech Republic) Jan Kumstát (Czech Republic) David Poljak	(Czech Republic) Petr Brunclík (Germany) Louis Wessels	(Czech Republic) Matyáš Černý (Brazil) José Pereira (Germany) Christian Djonov (Czech Republic) Martin Krumich
June 9	Kiseljak, Bosnia and Herzegovina; Clay; M25; Singles and doubles draws	(Bosnia and Herzegovina) Andrej Nedić; 6–4, 6–2	(Ukraine) Viacheslav Bielinskyi	(Austria) Joel Schwärzler (Austria) Sebastian Sorger	Marat Sharipov (Spain) Matias Ponce De Leon Gomila (Serbia) Branko Đurić (Italy) Gilberto Ravasio
June 9	Kiseljak, Bosnia and Herzegovina; Clay; M25; Singles and doubles draws	(Bosnia and Herzegovina) Mirza Bašić (Serbia) Marko Maksimović; 7–5, 6–3	(Bosnia and Herzegovina) Fatih Šišić (Croatia) Antonio Voljavec	(Austria) Joel Schwärzler (Austria) Sebastian Sorger	Marat Sharipov (Spain) Matias Ponce De Leon Gomila (Serbia) Branko Đurić (Italy) Gilberto Ravasio
June 9	Monastir, Tunisia; Hard; M25; Singles and doubles draws	(Tunisia) Moez Echargui; 6–4, 6–3	(Tunisia) Aziz Dougaz	(Italy) Fabrizio Andaloro (United Kingdom) Liam Broady	(France) Antoine Escoffier (Canada) Sasha Rozin (Spain) Jorge Plans (Spain) Iñaki Montes de la Torre
June 9	Monastir, Tunisia; Hard; M25; Singles and doubles draws	Daniil Ostapenkov (South Africa) Kris van Wyk; Walkover	(Brazil) Gilbert Klier Júnior (Brazil) Bruno Oliveira	(Italy) Fabrizio Andaloro (United Kingdom) Liam Broady	(France) Antoine Escoffier (Canada) Sasha Rozin (Spain) Jorge Plans (Spain) Iñaki Montes de la Torre
June 9	Santo Domingo, Dominican Republic; Hard; M25; Singles and doubles draws	(Dominican Republic) Roberto Cid Subervi; 6–3, 6–4	(Australia) Moerani Bouzige	(Canada) Juan Carlos Aguilar (Brazil) Lucas Andrade da Silva	(United States) Garrett Johns (United States) Adit Sinha (United States) Tristan McCormick (Dominican Republic) Peter Bertran
June 9	Santo Domingo, Dominican Republic; Hard; M25; Singles and doubles draws	(United States) Andre Ilagan (Antigua and Barbuda) Jody Maginley; 7–5, 6–7^{(4–7)}, [11–9]	(Brazil) Lucas Andrade da Silva (Brazil) Lucca Pignaton	(Canada) Juan Carlos Aguilar (Brazil) Lucas Andrade da Silva	(United States) Garrett Johns (United States) Adit Sinha (United States) Tristan McCormick (Dominican Republic) Peter Bertran
June 9	Wichita, United States; Hard; M25; Singles and doubles draws	(Japan) Hiroki Moriya; 7–6^{(8–6)}, 6–3	(Ecuador) Andrés Andrade	(Colombia) Nicolás Mejía (Canada) Justin Boulais	(Spain) Àlex Martínez (United States) Aidan Mayo (United States) Aidan Kim (United States) Nicolas Ian Kotzen
June 9	Wichita, United States; Hard; M25; Singles and doubles draws	(United States) Ozan Baris (New Zealand) Matthew Shearer; 7–6^{(7–4)}, 7–6^{(7–4)}	(Australia) Matt Hulme (Australia) Kody Pearson	(Colombia) Nicolás Mejía (Canada) Justin Boulais	(Spain) Àlex Martínez (United States) Aidan Mayo (United States) Aidan Kim (United States) Nicolas Ian Kotzen
June 9	Lu'an, China; Hard; M15; Singles and doubles draws	(Japan) Shunsuke Mitsui; 7–6^{(7–5)}, 6–1	(Thailand) Wishaya Trongcharoenchaikul	(India) Siddharth Vishwakarma (India) Mukund Sasikumar	Egor Gerasimov (United States) Evan Zhu (Japan) Takuya Kumasaka (Chinese Taipei) Huang Tsung-hao
June 9	Lu'an, China; Hard; M15; Singles and doubles draws	(Japan) Kokoro Isomura (Japan) Shunsuke Mitsui; 6–4, 6–4	(China) Mo Yecong (China) Zheng Yaojie	(India) Siddharth Vishwakarma (India) Mukund Sasikumar	Egor Gerasimov (United States) Evan Zhu (Japan) Takuya Kumasaka (Chinese Taipei) Huang Tsung-hao
June 9	Messina, Italy; Clay; M15; Singles and doubles draws	(Poland) Tomasz Berkieta; 6–4, 6–4	(Italy) Lorenzo Sciahbasi	(Brazil) João Eduardo Schiessl (Italy) Fausto Tabacco	(France) Théo Papamalamis (Italy) Manuel Mazza (Italy) Niccolò Catini (Italy) Samuele Pieri
June 9	Messina, Italy; Clay; M15; Singles and doubles draws	(Poland) Tomasz Berkieta (France) Théo Papamalamis; 6–4, 6–3	(Monaco) Rocco Piatti (Italy) Lorenzo Sciahbasi	(Brazil) João Eduardo Schiessl (Italy) Fausto Tabacco	(France) Théo Papamalamis (Italy) Manuel Mazza (Italy) Niccolò Catini (Italy) Samuele Pieri
June 9	Vaasa, Finland; Hard; M15; Singles and doubles draws	(United Kingdom) Millen Hurrion; 5–7, 6–4, 7–5	(United States) Martin Damm	(Finland) Aleksi Löfman (United Kingdom) Matthew Summers	(Germany) Moritz Kudernatsch (Sweden) Melvin Kumar (Italy) Andrea Fiorentini (Norway) Casper Christensen
June 9	Vaasa, Finland; Hard; M15; Singles and doubles draws	(Denmark) Oskar Brostrøm Poulsen (Sweden) Nikola Slavic; 7–6^{(7–5)}, 6–2	(Finland) Vesa Ahti (Germany) Tom Zeuch	(Finland) Aleksi Löfman (United Kingdom) Matthew Summers	(Germany) Moritz Kudernatsch (Sweden) Melvin Kumar (Italy) Andrea Fiorentini (Norway) Casper Christensen
June 9	Nyíregyháza, Hungary; Clay; M15; Singles and doubles draws	(Hungary) Péter Fajta; 6–3, 6–4	(Austria) Neil Oberleitner	(United Kingdom) Jeremy Gschwendtner (Czech Republic) Dominik Kellovský	(Hungary) Máté Valkusz (Colombia) Daniel Salazar (Poland) Aleksander Orlikowski (Slovakia) Alfred Almasi
June 9	Nyíregyháza, Hungary; Clay; M15; Singles and doubles draws	(Ukraine) Aleksandr Braynin (Ukraine) Georgii Kravchenko; 7–6^{(7–5)}, 7–6^{(7–1)}	(Czech Republic) Dominik Kellovský (Slovakia) Samuel Stolarik	(United Kingdom) Jeremy Gschwendtner (Czech Republic) Dominik Kellovský	(Hungary) Máté Valkusz (Colombia) Daniel Salazar (Poland) Aleksander Orlikowski (Slovakia) Alfred Almasi
June 9	Oradea, Romania; Clay; M15; Singles and doubles draws	(Romania) Gabriel Ghețu; 2–6, 6–4, 6–3	(Romania) Radu David Țurcanu	(Romania) Dan Alexandru Tomescu (Romania) Ștefan Paloși	(Romania) Ștefan Adrian Andreescu (Poland) Oskar Grzegorzewski (Germany) Marc Majdandzic (Czech Republic) Maxim Mrva
June 9	Oradea, Romania; Clay; M15; Singles and doubles draws	(Romania) Mihai Alexandru Coman (Poland) Oskar Grzegorzewski; 2–6, 6–2, [10–6]	(Romania) Gabriel Ghețu (Romania) Radu David Țurcanu	(Romania) Dan Alexandru Tomescu (Romania) Ștefan Paloși	(Romania) Ștefan Adrian Andreescu (Poland) Oskar Grzegorzewski (Germany) Marc Majdandzic (Czech Republic) Maxim Mrva
June 9	Kuršumlijska Banja, Serbia; Clay; M15; Singles and doubles draws	Svyatoslav Gulin; 3–6, 7–6^{(7–3)}, 6–1	(United Kingdom) Felix Gill	Denis Klok (Serbia) Ognjen Milić	(Argentina) Lautaro Agustín Falabella (Serbia) Dušan Obradović (Croatia) Josip Šimundža (Italy) Tommaso Compagnucci
June 9	Kuršumlijska Banja, Serbia; Clay; M15; Singles and doubles draws	Svyatoslav Gulin (Bulgaria) Leonid Sheyngezikht; 7–6^{(7–2)}, 6–3	(Chile) Ignacio Antonio Becerra Otárola (Chile) Daniel Antonio Núñez	Denis Klok (Serbia) Ognjen Milić	(Argentina) Lautaro Agustín Falabella (Serbia) Dušan Obradović (Croatia) Josip Šimundža (Italy) Tommaso Compagnucci
June 9	Kayseri, Turkiye; Hard; M15; Singles and doubles draws	Timofei Derepasko; 6–3, 6–4	(Colombia) Samuel Heredia	Semen Pankin (United States) Axel Nefve	(Bulgaria) Dinko Dinev (Colombia) Juan Sebastián Osorio (Iran) Ali Yazdani (Turkey) Alp Horoz
June 9	Kayseri, Turkiye; Hard; M15; Singles and doubles draws	(Netherlands) Daniel de Jonge (United Kingdom) Finn Murgett; 5–7, 6–3, [10–5]	Aleksandr Lobanov (Uzbekistan) Maxim Shin	Semen Pankin (United States) Axel Nefve	(Bulgaria) Dinko Dinev (Colombia) Juan Sebastián Osorio (Iran) Ali Yazdani (Turkey) Alp Horoz
June 9	Monastir, Tunisia; Hard; M15; Singles and doubles draws	(Belgium) Pierre Yves Bailly; 6–4, 2–6, 6–3	(United Kingdom) Luca Pow	(New Zealand) Jack Loutit (France) Nicolas Tepmahc	(Australia) Hayden Jones (United Kingdom) Marcus Walters (Brazil) Paulo André Saraiva dos Santos (Italy) Samuele Seghetti
June 9	Monastir, Tunisia; Hard; M15; Singles and doubles draws	(United Kingdom) Alexis Canter (United Kingdom) Marcus Walters; 5–7, 6–4, [10–8]	(United Kingdom) Billy Blaydes (United Kingdom) Patrick Foley	(New Zealand) Jack Loutit (France) Nicolas Tepmahc	(Australia) Hayden Jones (United Kingdom) Marcus Walters (Brazil) Paulo André Saraiva dos Santos (Italy) Samuele Seghetti
June 9	Harmon, Guam; Hard; M15; Singles and doubles draws	(Japan) Yusuke Kusuhara; 2–6, 6–2, 7–6^{(7–5)}	(Japan) Kenta Miyoshi	(Australia) Jesse Delaney (Japan) Hikaru Shiraishi	(Australia) Jake Delaney (Japan) Kosuke Ogura (Japan) Yuta Kawahashi (Northern Mariana Islands) Colin Sinclair
June 9	Harmon, Guam; Hard; M15; Singles and doubles draws	(Japan) Yusuke Kusuhara (Japan) Shunsuke Nakagawa; 6–2, 6–4	(Japan) Toshihide Matsui (Japan) Masakatsu Noguchi	(Australia) Jesse Delaney (Japan) Hikaru Shiraishi	(Australia) Jake Delaney (Japan) Kosuke Ogura (Japan) Yuta Kawahashi (Northern Mariana Islands) Colin Sinclair
June 9	San Diego, United States; Hard; M15; Singles and doubles draws	(United States) Trevor Svajda; 6–2, 6–3	(Netherlands) Stian Klaassen	(United Kingdom) Oliver Tarvet; Savriyan Danilov	(United Kingdom) Toby Samuel (United States) Andrew Fenty (United States) Alafia Ayeni (United States) Quinn Vandecasteele
June 9	San Diego, United States; Hard; M15; Singles and doubles draws	Savriyan Danilov (Netherlands) Stian Klaassen; 6–4, 6–7^{(7–9)}, [15–13]	(United States) Keshav Chopra (United States) Phillip Jordan	(United Kingdom) Oliver Tarvet; Savriyan Danilov	(United Kingdom) Toby Samuel (United States) Andrew Fenty (United States) Alafia Ayeni (United States) Quinn Vandecasteele
June 16	Luzhou, China; Hard; M25; Singles and doubles draws	(Switzerland) Luca Castelnuovo; 6–3, 6–3	(China) Cui Jie	(Japan) Shunsuke Mitsui (Japan) Takuya Kumasaka	(Japan) Shintaro Imai (Malaysia) Mitsuki Wei Kang Leong (United States) Evan Zhu (South Korea) Shin Woobin
June 16	Luzhou, China; Hard; M25; Singles and doubles draws	(Switzerland) Luca Castelnuovo (China) Zheng Baoluo; 3–6, 7–6^{(7–3)}, [10–4]	(South Korea) Jeong Yeong-seok (South Korea) Park Ui-sung	(Japan) Shunsuke Mitsui (Japan) Takuya Kumasaka	(Japan) Shintaro Imai (Malaysia) Mitsuki Wei Kang Leong (United States) Evan Zhu (South Korea) Shin Woobin
June 16	Klosters, Switzerland; Clay; M25; Singles and doubles draws	(Austria) Sandro Kopp; 0–6, 6–4, 6–4	(Austria) Joel Schwärzler	(Germany) Marvin Möller (Switzerland) Rémy Bertola	(Switzerland) Damien Wenger (Australia) Matthew Dellavedova (Austria) Maximilian Neuchrist (Bulgaria) Petr Nesterov
June 16	Klosters, Switzerland; Clay; M25; Singles and doubles draws	(Bulgaria) Petr Nesterov (Switzerland) Timofey Stepanov; 7–6^{(7–4)}, 6–4	(France) Corentin Denolly (Austria) Maximilian Neuchrist	(Germany) Marvin Möller (Switzerland) Rémy Bertola	(Switzerland) Damien Wenger (Australia) Matthew Dellavedova (Austria) Maximilian Neuchrist (Bulgaria) Petr Nesterov
June 16	Cattolica, Italy; Clay; M25; Singles and doubles draws	(Italy) Manuel Mazza; 6–4, 6–4	(Italy) Carlo Alberto Caniato	(Italy) Alessandro Pecci (Italy) Giovanni Oradini	(Italy) Gabriele Pennaforti (Italy) Andrea Picchione (Italy) Filippo Romano (Italy) Luca Castagnola
June 16	Cattolica, Italy; Clay; M25; Singles and doubles draws	(Italy) Carlo Alberto Caniato (Italy) Filippo Romano; 6–2, 6–7^{(2–7)}, [10–8]	(Italy) Niccolò Catini (Italy) Lorenzo Sciahbasi	(Italy) Alessandro Pecci (Italy) Giovanni Oradini	(Italy) Gabriele Pennaforti (Italy) Andrea Picchione (Italy) Filippo Romano (Italy) Luca Castagnola
June 16	Monastir, Tunisia; Hard; M25; Singles and doubles draws	(France) Robin Bertrand; 6–3, 1–6, 6–3	(Italy) Fabrizio Andaloro	(Tunisia) Aziz Dougaz (Italy) Luca Potenza	(Turkey) Tuncay Duran (Tunisia) Moez Echargui (Turkey) Mert Alkaya (Tunisia) Aziz Ouakaa
June 16	Monastir, Tunisia; Hard; M25; Singles and doubles draws	(Ivory Coast) Eliakim Coulibaly (Ghana) Isaac Nortey; 4–6, 6–4, [10–6]	(Turkey) Mert Alkaya (Turkey) Tuncay Duran	(Tunisia) Aziz Dougaz (Italy) Luca Potenza	(Turkey) Tuncay Duran (Tunisia) Moez Echargui (Turkey) Mert Alkaya (Tunisia) Aziz Ouakaa
June 16	Tulsa, United States; Hard; M25; Singles and doubles draws	(Spain) Àlex Martínez; 5–7, 6–3, 6–0	(United States) Alex Rybakov	(United States) Daniel Milavsky (United States) Patrick Maloney	(United States) Aidan Mayo (Canada) Justin Boulais (United States) Garrett Johns (France) Antoine Ghibaudo
June 16	Tulsa, United States; Hard; M25; Singles and doubles draws	(United States) Zachary Fuchs (United States) Wally Thayne; 6–3, 3–6, [10–6]	(United States) Pranav Kumar (United States) Daniel Milavsky	(United States) Daniel Milavsky (United States) Patrick Maloney	(United States) Aidan Mayo (Canada) Justin Boulais (United States) Garrett Johns (France) Antoine Ghibaudo
June 16	Mungia-Laukariz, Spain; Clay (i); M15; Singles and doubles draws	(Spain) Iñaki Montes de la Torre; 6–4, 6–4	(Poland) Marcel Zieliński	(Spain) Miguel Damas (Spain) Sergi Pérez Contri	(United States) Tristan Stringer (Spain) Albert Pedrico Kravtsov (Venezuela) Ignacio Parisca Romera (Italy) Alberto Bronzetti
June 16	Mungia-Laukariz, Spain; Clay (i); M15; Singles and doubles draws	(Spain) Iker Gaztambide Arrastia (Spain) Alex Martinez Sanz; 6–2, 6–3	(Czech Republic) Vít Kalina (United States) Tristan Stringer	(Spain) Miguel Damas (Spain) Sergi Pérez Contri	(United States) Tristan Stringer (Spain) Albert Pedrico Kravtsov (Venezuela) Ignacio Parisca Romera (Italy) Alberto Bronzetti
June 16	Duffel, Belgium; Clay; M15; Singles and doubles draws	(Belgium) Tibo Colson; 6–2, 6–2	(Netherlands) Abel Forger	(Germany) Yannik Kelm (Belgium) Gilles-Arnaud Bailly	(Belgium) Maikel De Boes (Sweden) Olle Wallin (Germany) Florian Broska (Belgium) Niels Ratiu
June 16	Duffel, Belgium; Clay; M15; Singles and doubles draws	(Germany) Jannik Opitz (Germany) Tom Zeuch; 0–6, 7–5, [11–9]	(United States) Karl Poling (Sweden) Nikola Slavic	(Germany) Yannik Kelm (Belgium) Gilles-Arnaud Bailly	(Belgium) Maikel De Boes (Sweden) Olle Wallin (Germany) Florian Broska (Belgium) Niels Ratiu
June 16	Saarlouis, Germany; Clay; M15; Singles and doubles draws	(Spain) Imanol López Morillo; 6–0, 6–1	(France) Axel Garcian	(Denmark) Christian Sigsgaard (France) Amaury Raynel	(Germany) Adrian Oetzbach (Czech Republic) Jakub Filip (Germany) Milan Welte (Slovenia) Filip Jeff Planinšek
June 16	Saarlouis, Germany; Clay; M15; Singles and doubles draws	(Luxembourg) Louis Van Herck (Germany) Marlon Vankan; 4–6, 6–2, [12–10]	(Germany) Julien Penzlin (Germany) Alessio Vasquez Gehrke	(Denmark) Christian Sigsgaard (France) Amaury Raynel	(Germany) Adrian Oetzbach (Czech Republic) Jakub Filip (Germany) Milan Welte (Slovenia) Filip Jeff Planinšek
June 16	Nyíregyháza, Hungary; Clay; M15; Singles and doubles draws	(Hungary) Máté Valkusz; 6–1, 7–5	(Italy) Pietro Romeo Scomparin	(Czech Republic) Matthew William Donald (Cyprus) Melios Efstathiou	(Romania) Dragoș Nicolae Cazacu (Poland) Karol Filar (Ukraine) Nikita Mashtakov (Brazil) Oscar José Gutierrez
June 16	Nyíregyháza, Hungary; Clay; M15; Singles and doubles draws	(Ukraine) Aleksandr Braynin (Ukraine) Georgii Kravchenko; 7–6^{(7–5)}, 6–4	(Slovakia) Radovan Michalik (Slovakia) Peter Nad	(Czech Republic) Matthew William Donald (Cyprus) Melios Efstathiou	(Romania) Dragoș Nicolae Cazacu (Poland) Karol Filar (Ukraine) Nikita Mashtakov (Brazil) Oscar José Gutierrez
June 16	Cluj-Napoca, Romania; Clay; M15; Singles and doubles draws	(Brazil) João Eduardo Schiessl; 6–4, 6–0	(Romania) Ștefan Adrian Andreescu	(Romania) Radu Mihai Papoe; Kirill Kivattsev	(Italy) Giuseppe La Vela (Romania) Ștefan Paloși (Moldova) Ilya Snițari (Romania) Cezar Gabriel Papoe
June 16	Cluj-Napoca, Romania; Clay; M15; Singles and doubles draws	(Romania) Ioan Alexandru Chiriță (Romania) Radu Mihai Papoe; 7–5, 6–2	(Bulgaria) Samuil Konov (Moldova) Ilya Snițari	(Romania) Radu Mihai Papoe; Kirill Kivattsev	(Italy) Giuseppe La Vela (Romania) Ștefan Paloși (Moldova) Ilya Snițari (Romania) Cezar Gabriel Papoe
June 16	Kuršumlijska Banja, Serbia; Clay; M15; Singles and doubles draws	Svyatoslav Gulin; 4–6, 7–5, 6–2	(Chile) Benjamín Torrealba	(Chile) Daniel Antonio Núñez; Denis Klok	(Austria) Piet Luis Pinter; Andrey Chepelev (Brazil) Bruno Fernandez (Chile) Amador Salazar
June 16	Kuršumlijska Banja, Serbia; Clay; M15; Singles and doubles draws	(Chile) Nicolás Bruna (Argentina) Lautaro Agustín Falabella; 7–6^{(7–5)}, 6–3	(Serbia) Nikola Jović (North Macedonia) Obrad Markovski	(Chile) Daniel Antonio Núñez; Denis Klok	(Austria) Piet Luis Pinter; Andrey Chepelev (Brazil) Bruno Fernandez (Chile) Amador Salazar
June 16	Kayseri, Turkiye; Hard; M15; Singles and doubles draws	(Turkey) Arda Azkara; 6–3, 6–1	Semen Pankin	(France) Constantin Bittoun Kouzmine (France) Paul Inchauspé	(Colombia) Samuel Heredia (United States) Axel Nefve (Uzbekistan) Maxim Shin (Slovakia) Michal Krajčí
June 16	Kayseri, Turkiye; Hard; M15; Singles and doubles draws	(Senegal) Seydina André (France) Nicolas Jadoun; 3–6, 6–3, [10–4]	(Venezuela) Brandon Pérez (Australia) Stefan Vujic	(France) Constantin Bittoun Kouzmine (France) Paul Inchauspé	(Colombia) Samuel Heredia (United States) Axel Nefve (Uzbekistan) Maxim Shin (Slovakia) Michal Krajčí
June 16	Monastir, Tunisia; Hard; M15; Singles and doubles draws	(Italy) Filippo Moroni; 7–5, 6–1	(Brazil) Paulo André Saraiva dos Santos	(France) Yanis Ghazouani Durand (United Kingdom) Hugo Coquelin	(India) Dev Javia (France) Alexis Gautier (Cyprus) Photos Photiades (France) Charlélie Cosnet
June 16	Monastir, Tunisia; Hard; M15; Singles and doubles draws	(India) S D Prajwal Dev (India) Nitin Kumar Sinha; 6–4, 6–4	(United Kingdom) Matthew Rankin (United Kingdom) Marcus Walters	(France) Yanis Ghazouani Durand (United Kingdom) Hugo Coquelin	(India) Dev Javia (France) Alexis Gautier (Cyprus) Photos Photiades (France) Charlélie Cosnet
June 16	Casablanca, Morocco; Clay; M15; Singles and doubles draws	(Italy) Massimo Giunta; 6–4, 6–3	(Morocco) Yassine Dlimi	(Morocco) Mehdi Benchakroun (Argentina) Lucio Ratti	(Morocco) Walid Ahouda (France) Sean Cuenin (Argentina) Juan Bautista Otegui (Morocco) Reda Bennani
June 16	Casablanca, Morocco; Clay; M15; Singles and doubles draws	(Italy) Massimo Giunta (Italy) Mariano Tammaro; 6–4, 7–5	(Morocco) Taha Baadi (Morocco) Younes Lalami Laaroussi	(Morocco) Mehdi Benchakroun (Argentina) Lucio Ratti	(Morocco) Walid Ahouda (France) Sean Cuenin (Argentina) Juan Bautista Otegui (Morocco) Reda Bennani
June 16	Rancho Santa Fe, United States; Hard; M15; Singles and doubles draws	(United States) Andrew Fenty; 3–6, 6–4, 6–4	(United States) Jack Anthrop	(United States) Rudy Quan (United States) Kyle Kang	(United States) Theodore Dean (United States) Noah Zamora (Australia) Oliver Anderson (Australia) Moerani Bouzige
June 16	Rancho Santa Fe, United States; Hard; M15; Singles and doubles draws	(United States) Theodore Dean (United States) Aadarsh Tripathi; 6–1, 7–6^{(7–5)}	(United Kingdom) Finn Bass (United States) Strong Kirchheimer	(United States) Rudy Quan (United States) Kyle Kang	(United States) Theodore Dean (United States) Noah Zamora (Australia) Oliver Anderson (Australia) Moerani Bouzige
June 23	Elvas, Portugal; Hard; M25; Singles and doubles draws	(United States) Martin Damm; 6–3, 6–2	(France) Dan Added	(United Kingdom) Finn Murgett (Poland) Olaf Pieczkowski	(Spain) Alberto Barroso Campos (Portugal) Pedro Araújo (Portugal) Rodrigo Fernandes (Sweden) Leo Borg
June 23	Elvas, Portugal; Hard; M25; Singles and doubles draws	(United Kingdom) Liam Broady (United Kingdom) Charlie Robertson; 7–5, 6–2	(France) Dan Added (Estonia) Johannes Seeman	(United Kingdom) Finn Murgett (Poland) Olaf Pieczkowski	(Spain) Alberto Barroso Campos (Portugal) Pedro Araújo (Portugal) Rodrigo Fernandes (Sweden) Leo Borg
June 23	Bakio, Spain; Hard; M25; Singles and doubles draws	(France) Clément Chidekh; 6–0, 6–2	(Colombia) Adrià Soriano Barrera	(Spain) Iñaki Montes de la Torre (United States) Darwin Blanch	(France) Robin Catry (France) Yanis Ghazouani Durand (Turkey) Kuzey Çekirge (Germany) Mats Rosenkranz
June 23	Bakio, Spain; Hard; M25; Singles and doubles draws	(France) Clément Chidekh (United Kingdom) Mark Whitehouse; 6–3, 7–5	(United Kingdom) Liam Hignett (United Kingdom) James MacKinlay	(Spain) Iñaki Montes de la Torre (United States) Darwin Blanch	(France) Robin Catry (France) Yanis Ghazouani Durand (Turkey) Kuzey Çekirge (Germany) Mats Rosenkranz
June 23	Montauban, France; Clay; M25; Singles and doubles draws	(Spain) Miguel Damas; 6–1, 7–6^{(9–7)}	(Spain) Nikolás Sánchez Izquierdo	(France) Étienne Donnet (Netherlands) Jelle Sels	(France) Matteo Martineau (France) Florent Bax (France) Thomas Gerbaud (France) Tristan Lamasine
June 23	Montauban, France; Clay; M25; Singles and doubles draws	(France) Axel Garcian (France) Arthur Reymond; 6–2, 4–6, [10–4]	(France) Florent Bax (France) Benjamin Pietri	(France) Étienne Donnet (Netherlands) Jelle Sels	(France) Matteo Martineau (France) Florent Bax (France) Thomas Gerbaud (France) Tristan Lamasine
June 23	Brussels, Belgium; Clay; M25; Singles and doubles draws	(Germany) Marvin Möller; Walkover	(France) Enzo Couacaud	(Dominican Republic) Nick Hardt (South Korea) Gerard Campaña Lee	(Brazil) Daniel Dutra da Silva (Greece) Aristotelis Thanos (Belgium) Martin van der Meerschen (Belgium) Tibo Colson
June 23	Brussels, Belgium; Clay; M25; Singles and doubles draws	(Belgium) Émilien Demanet (Belgium) Niels Ratiu; 6–4, 6–4	(Germany) Jannik Opitz (Germany) Tom Zeuch	(Dominican Republic) Nick Hardt (South Korea) Gerard Campaña Lee	(Brazil) Daniel Dutra da Silva (Greece) Aristotelis Thanos (Belgium) Martin van der Meerschen (Belgium) Tibo Colson
June 23	Târgu Mureș, Romania; Clay; M25; Singles and doubles draws	(Romania) Dan Alexandru Tomescu; 6–2, 7–6^{(7–4)}	(Spain) Àlex Martí Pujolràs	(France) Corentin Denolly; Kirill Kivattsev	(United States) Felix Corwin (Romania) Sebastian Gima (Romania) Gabi Adrian Boitan (Romania) Cezar Crețu
June 23	Târgu Mureș, Romania; Clay; M25; Singles and doubles draws	(Italy) Franco Agamenone (Spain) Àlex Martí Pujolràs; 3–6, 6–1, [10–8]	(France) Corentin Denolly (Romania) Bogdan Pavel	(France) Corentin Denolly; Kirill Kivattsev	(United States) Felix Corwin (Romania) Sebastian Gima (Romania) Gabi Adrian Boitan (Romania) Cezar Crețu
June 23	Monastir, Tunisia; Hard; M25; Singles and doubles draws	(France) Robin Bertrand; 3–6, 6–3, 7–6^{(7–4)}	(Ivory Coast) Eliakim Coulibaly	(Italy) Fabrizio Andaloro (Spain) Pablo Martínez Gómez	(Ukraine) Yurii Dzhavakian (India) Karan Singh (Italy) Filippo Moroni; Daniil Ostapenkov
June 23	Monastir, Tunisia; Hard; M25; Singles and doubles draws	Sergey Betov; Daniil Ostapenkov; 7–5, 6–4	(Republic of Ireland) Charles Barry (New Zealand) Ajeet Rai	(Italy) Fabrizio Andaloro (Spain) Pablo Martínez Gómez	(Ukraine) Yurii Dzhavakian (India) Karan Singh (Italy) Filippo Moroni; Daniil Ostapenkov
June 23	Ma'anshan, China; Hard (i); M15; Singles and doubles draws	(Switzerland) Luca Castelnuovo; 6–4, 6–4	(Thailand) Pawit Sornlaksup	(Northern Mariana Islands) Colin Sinclair; Egor Gerasimov	(China) Wang Xiaofei (Japan) Kokoro Isomura (Latvia) Kārlis Ozoliņš (China) Lu Pengyu
June 23	Ma'anshan, China; Hard (i); M15; Singles and doubles draws	(South Korea) Jeong Yeong-seok (Japan) Tomohiro Masabayashi; 7–6^{(7–5)}, 2–6, [14–12]	(Japan) Kokoro Isomura (Japan) Yamato Sueoka	(Northern Mariana Islands) Colin Sinclair; Egor Gerasimov	(China) Wang Xiaofei (Japan) Kokoro Isomura (Latvia) Kārlis Ozoliņš (China) Lu Pengyu
June 23	Alkmaar, Netherlands; Clay; M15; Singles and doubles draws	(France) Lilian Marmousez; 6–3, 6–0	(Denmark) Carl Emil Overbeck	(Netherlands) Dax Donders (France) Theo Papamalamis	(Netherlands) Manvydas Balciunas (Germany) Mika Lipp (Netherlands) Abel Forger (Czech Republic) Denis Peták
June 23	Alkmaar, Netherlands; Clay; M15; Singles and doubles draws	(Netherlands) Dax Donders (Netherlands) Niels Visker; 7–6^{(7–3)}, 7–5	(Netherlands) Daniel de Jonge (United States) William Grant	(Netherlands) Dax Donders (France) Theo Papamalamis	(Netherlands) Manvydas Balciunas (Germany) Mika Lipp (Netherlands) Abel Forger (Czech Republic) Denis Peták
June 23	Kamen, Germany; Clay; M15; Singles and doubles draws	(Germany) Cedrik-Marcel Stebe; 3–6, 6–4, 5–3 ret.	(Czech Republic) Jakub Nicod	(Germany) Louis Wessels (Ukraine) Aleksandr Braynin	(Germany) Oscar Otte (Luxembourg) Alex Knaff (Republic of Ireland) Michael Agwi (Germany) Maik Steiner
June 23	Kamen, Germany; Clay; M15; Singles and doubles draws	(South Africa) Alec Beckley (Germany) Louis Wessels; 6–1, 3–6, [10–6]	(Czech Republic) Jakub Jupa (Czech Republic) Jakub Nicod	(Germany) Louis Wessels (Ukraine) Aleksandr Braynin	(Germany) Oscar Otte (Luxembourg) Alex Knaff (Republic of Ireland) Michael Agwi (Germany) Maik Steiner
June 23	Grodzisk Mazowiecki, Poland; Clay; M15; Singles and doubles draws	(Czech Republic) Zdeněk Kolář; 6–4, 6–2	(Czech Republic) Jakub Filip	(Poland) Tomasz Berkieta (Czech Republic) Matyáš Černý	(Poland) Szymon Kielan (Cyprus) Melios Efstathiou (Switzerland) Nicolás Parizzia (Switzerland) Jeffrey von der Schulenburg
June 23	Grodzisk Mazowiecki, Poland; Clay; M15; Singles and doubles draws	(Poland) Tomasz Berkieta (Poland) Mateusz Lange; Walkover	(Czech Republic) Matyáš Černý (Czech Republic) Jonáš Kučera	(Poland) Tomasz Berkieta (Czech Republic) Matyáš Černý	(Poland) Szymon Kielan (Cyprus) Melios Efstathiou (Switzerland) Nicolás Parizzia (Switzerland) Jeffrey von der Schulenburg
June 23	Bergamo, Italy; Clay; M15; Singles and doubles draws	(Italy) Gianmarco Ferrari; 4–6, 7–6^{(8–6)}, 7–6^{(9–7)}	(Italy) Alessandro Pecci	(Italy) Giuseppe La Vela (Czech Republic) Matthew William Donald	(Italy) Leonardo Malgaroli (Iran) Kasra Rahmani (Netherlands) Mees Röttgering (Italy) Giorgio Tabacco
June 23	Bergamo, Italy; Clay; M15; Singles and doubles draws	(Italy) Leonardo Malgaroli (Italy) Samuele Seghetti; 6–3, 6–3	(Italy) Andrea Motta (Italy) Leonardo Taddia	(Italy) Giuseppe La Vela (Czech Republic) Matthew William Donald	(Italy) Leonardo Malgaroli (Iran) Kasra Rahmani (Netherlands) Mees Röttgering (Italy) Giorgio Tabacco
June 23	Zagreb, Croatia; Clay; M15; Singles and doubles draws	(Bosnia and Herzegovina) Mirza Bašić; 6–7^{(4–7)}, 7–6^{(7–4)}, 6–4	(Croatia) Josip Šimundža	(Ukraine) Nikita Mashtakov (North Macedonia) Kalin Ivanovski	(Croatia) Noa Vukadin (Portugal) Francisco Rocha (Croatia) Emanuel Ivanišević (Croatia) Vito Tonejc
June 23	Zagreb, Croatia; Clay; M15; Singles and doubles draws	(Bosnia and Herzegovina) Mirza Bašić (Slovenia) Jan Kupčič; 4–6, 7–6^{(7–2)}, [10–8]	(Hungary) Adam Jilly (Hungary) Botond Kisantal	(Ukraine) Nikita Mashtakov (North Macedonia) Kalin Ivanovski	(Croatia) Noa Vukadin (Portugal) Francisco Rocha (Croatia) Emanuel Ivanišević (Croatia) Vito Tonejc
June 23	Kuršumlijska Banja, Serbia; Clay; M15; Singles and doubles draws	(Serbia) Stefan Popović; 6–1, 6–1	(Brazil) Igor Marcondes	(Serbia) Simeon Stanković (France) Paul Barbier Gazeu	(Serbia) Branko Đurić (Germany) Maximilian Homberg (Brazil) Bruno Fernandez (Chile) Daniel Antonio Núñez
June 23	Kuršumlijska Banja, Serbia; Clay; M15; Singles and doubles draws	(Brazil) Igor Marcondes (Brazil) Nicolas Zanellato; 7–6^{(7–4)}, 6–4	(Romania) Lucas Gustin (Croatia) Kristian Tumbas Kajgo	(Serbia) Simeon Stanković (France) Paul Barbier Gazeu	(Serbia) Branko Đurić (Germany) Maximilian Homberg (Brazil) Bruno Fernandez (Chile) Daniel Antonio Núñez
June 23	Kayseri, Turkiye; Hard; M15; Singles and doubles draws	(France) Paul Inchauspé; 3–6, 6–2, 6–2	(Turkey) Arda Azkara	(France) Constantin Bittoun Kouzmine (Turkey) Mert Naci Türker	(Ukraine) Volodymyr Iakubenko (France) Nicolas Tepmahc (France) Guillaume Dalmasso (Uzbekistan) Amir Milushev
June 23	Kayseri, Turkiye; Hard; M15; Singles and doubles draws	(France) Constantin Bittoun Kouzmine (Germany) Niklas Schell; 7–6^{(7–5)}, 2–6, [10–2]	(Turkey) Gökberk Sarıtaş (Turkey) Mert Naci Türker	(France) Constantin Bittoun Kouzmine (Turkey) Mert Naci Türker	(Ukraine) Volodymyr Iakubenko (France) Nicolas Tepmahc (France) Guillaume Dalmasso (Uzbekistan) Amir Milushev
June 23	Monastir, Tunisia; Hard; M15; Singles and doubles draws	(United States) Cooper Williams; 6–3, 6–1	(United Kingdom) Marcus Walters	(United Kingdom) Matthew Summers (France) César Bouchelaghem	(Australia) Sam Ryan Ziegann (Turkey) Tuncay Duran (Brazil) Paulo André Saraiva dos Santos (Germany) Moritz Kudernatsch
June 23	Monastir, Tunisia; Hard; M15; Singles and doubles draws	(Spain) Alejandro Manzanera Pertusa (India) Nitin Kumar Sinha; 7–6^{(13–11)}, 6–3	(Kazakhstan) Grigoriy Lomakin (United Kingdom) Luca Pow	(United Kingdom) Matthew Summers (France) César Bouchelaghem	(Australia) Sam Ryan Ziegann (Turkey) Tuncay Duran (Brazil) Paulo André Saraiva dos Santos (Germany) Moritz Kudernatsch
June 23	Casablanca, Morocco; Clay; M15; Singles and doubles draws	(Switzerland) Damien Wenger; 5–7, 7–6^{(7–4)}, 6–3	(Netherlands) Stijn Slump	(Morocco) Reda Bennani (Spain) Mario González Fernández	(Argentina) Lucio Ratti (Spain) Alejandro Turriziani Álvarez (Mexico) Rodrigo Alujas (Morocco) Amine Jamji
June 23	Casablanca, Morocco; Clay; M15; Singles and doubles draws	(Morocco) Younes Lalami Laaroussi (Switzerland) Damien Wenger; 6–4, 6–3	(Argentina) Manuel Mouilleron Salvo (Argentina) Juan Bautista Otegui	(Morocco) Reda Bennani (Spain) Mario González Fernández	(Argentina) Lucio Ratti (Spain) Alejandro Turriziani Álvarez (Mexico) Rodrigo Alujas (Morocco) Amine Jamji
June 23	Lakewood, United States; Hard; M15; Singles and doubles draws	(United States) Trevor Svajda; 6–4, 6–4	(United States) Spencer Johnson	(Brazil) Karuê Sell (United States) Garrett Johns	(United States) Dominique Rolland (Australia) Dane Sweeny (Poland) Maciej Rajski (United States) Kyle Kang
June 23	Lakewood, United States; Hard; M15; Singles and doubles draws	(United States) Kyle Kang (United States) Trevor Svajda; 4–6, 6–3, [10–4]	(United States) Alfredo Perez (United States) Jamie Vance	(Brazil) Karuê Sell (United States) Garrett Johns	(United States) Dominique Rolland (Australia) Dane Sweeny (Poland) Maciej Rajski (United States) Kyle Kang
June 30	Ajaccio, France; Hard; M25+H; Singles and doubles draws	(France) Antoine Escoffier; 7–6^{(7–5)}, 7–6^{(7–5)}	(France) Laurent Lokoli	(France) Robin Bertrand (France) Clément Chidekh	(Italy) Pietro Orlando Fellin (France) Maé Malige (United Kingdom) Giles Hussey (France) Louis Dussin
June 30	Ajaccio, France; Hard; M25+H; Singles and doubles draws	(France) Yanis Ghazouani Durand (France) Loan Massard; 6–2, 6–3	(France) Robin Bertrand (France) Clément Chidekh	(France) Robin Bertrand (France) Clément Chidekh	(Italy) Pietro Orlando Fellin (France) Maé Malige (United Kingdom) Giles Hussey (France) Louis Dussin
June 30	Figueira da Foz, Portugal; Hard; M25; Singles and doubles draws	(Portugal) Tiago Pereira; 6–2, 6–1	(United States) Darwin Blanch	(Spain) Àlex Martínez (Portugal) Gastão Elias	(France) Hugo Car (Japan) Hayato Matsuoka (France) Dan Added (Portugal) Pedro Araújo
June 30	Figueira da Foz, Portugal; Hard; M25; Singles and doubles draws	(Portugal) Vasco Leote Prata (Portugal) Diogo Morais; 6–4, 2–6, [10–4]	(Spain) Rafael Izquierdo Luque (Spain) Iván Marrero Curbelo	(Spain) Àlex Martínez (Portugal) Gastão Elias	(France) Hugo Car (Japan) Hayato Matsuoka (France) Dan Added (Portugal) Pedro Araújo
June 30	Marburg, Germany; Clay; M25; Singles and doubles draws	(Slovenia) Filip Jeff Planinšek; 6–2, 3–6, 6–4	(Germany) Florian Broska	(Spain) Nicolás Álvarez Varona (Brazil) Daniel Dutra da Silva	(Austria) Sandro Kopp (Republic of Ireland) Michael Agwi (Dominican Republic) Nick Hardt (Switzerland) Rémy Bertola
June 30	Marburg, Germany; Clay; M25; Singles and doubles draws	(France) Max Westphal (United States) Theodore Winegar; 7–6^{(9–7)}, 6–2	(Austria) Maximilian Neuchrist (Germany) Kai Wehnelt	(Spain) Nicolás Álvarez Varona (Brazil) Daniel Dutra da Silva	(Austria) Sandro Kopp (Republic of Ireland) Michael Agwi (Dominican Republic) Nick Hardt (Switzerland) Rémy Bertola
June 30	Hillcrest, South Africa; Hard; M25; Singles and doubles draws	(South Africa) Philip Henning; 6–2, 5–7, 6–1	(United States) Adhithya Ganesan	(Poland) Filip Peliwo (South Africa) Devin Badenhorst	(Italy) Filippo Alberti (South Africa) Khololwam Montsi (Tunisia) Aziz Ouakaa (Turkey) Ergi Kırkın
June 30	Hillcrest, South Africa; Hard; M25; Singles and doubles draws	(South Africa) Devin Badenhorst (United Kingdom) Luc Koenig; 5–7, 6–1, [10–8]	(Egypt) Akram El Sallaly (South Africa) Khololwam Montsi	(Poland) Filip Peliwo (South Africa) Devin Badenhorst	(Italy) Filippo Alberti (South Africa) Khololwam Montsi (Tunisia) Aziz Ouakaa (Turkey) Ergi Kırkın
June 30	Laval, Canada; Hard; M25; Singles and doubles draws	(Jamaica) Blaise Bicknell; 3–6, 7–6^{(8–6)}, 7–6^{(7–5)}	(Canada) Justin Boulais	(United States) Cooper Woestendick (United Kingdom) Aidan McHugh	(Canada) Keegan Rice (Canada) Duncan Chan (Canada) Nicolas Arseneault (United States) Daniel Milavsky
June 30	Laval, Canada; Hard; M25; Singles and doubles draws	(Canada) Duncan Chan (United States) Cooper Woestendick; 7–6^{(7–5)}, 6–0	(United States) Alafia Ayeni (Australia) Ethan Cook	(United States) Cooper Woestendick (United Kingdom) Aidan McHugh	(Canada) Keegan Rice (Canada) Duncan Chan (Canada) Nicolas Arseneault (United States) Daniel Milavsky
June 30	Ma'anshan, China; Hard (i); M15; Singles and doubles draws	(Japan) Koki Matsuda; 6–1, 7–6^{(9–7)}	(Thailand) Kasidit Samrej	(China) Zheng Yaojie (South Korea) Shin Sanhui	(China) Bai Yan (China) Lu Pengyu (Thailand) Thantub Suksumrarn (Japan) Daisuke Sumizawa
June 30	Ma'anshan, China; Hard (i); M15; Singles and doubles draws	(Japan) Shinji Hazawa (Japan) Ryotaro Taguchi; 6–7^{(3–7)}, 6–3, [10–4]	(Thailand) Thanapet Chanta (Thailand) Pawit Sornlaksup	(China) Zheng Yaojie (South Korea) Shin Sanhui	(China) Bai Yan (China) Lu Pengyu (Thailand) Thantub Suksumrarn (Japan) Daisuke Sumizawa
June 30	Tokyo, Japan; Hard; M15; Singles and doubles draws	(Japan) Renta Tokuda; 6–1, 6–0	(Japan) Hikaru Shiraishi	(South Korea) Shin Woobin (Japan) Yusuke Kusuhara	(Turkey) Koray Kırcı (Australia) Jake Delaney (Japan) Ryota Tanuma (Japan) Shu Matsuoka
June 30	Tokyo, Japan; Hard; M15; Singles and doubles draws	(Japan) Yusuke Kusuhara (Japan) Shunsuke Nakagawa; 7–5, 4–6, [10–7]	(Japan) Taisei Ichikawa (Japan) Masakatsu Noguchi	(South Korea) Shin Woobin (Japan) Yusuke Kusuhara	(Turkey) Koray Kırcı (Australia) Jake Delaney (Japan) Ryota Tanuma (Japan) Shu Matsuoka
June 30	Getxo, Spain; Clay; M15; Singles and doubles draws	(Spain) Miguel Damas; 6–4 ret.	(United Kingdom) Felix Gill	(France) Leo Raquillet (Spain) Albert Pedrico Kravtsov	(France) Pierre Delage (Italy) Lorenzo Bocchi (Venezuela) Ignacio Parisca Romera (Netherlands) Michiel de Krom
June 30	Getxo, Spain; Clay; M15; Singles and doubles draws	(Switzerland) Adrien Burdet (Italy) Pietro Pampanin; 6–3, 6–4	(Spain) Iker Gaztambide Arrastia (Spain) Alex Martinez Sanz	(France) Leo Raquillet (Spain) Albert Pedrico Kravtsov	(France) Pierre Delage (Italy) Lorenzo Bocchi (Venezuela) Ignacio Parisca Romera (Netherlands) Michiel de Krom
June 30	Amstelveen, Netherlands; Clay; M15; Singles and doubles draws	(France) Lilian Marmousez; 6–3, 6–4	(Germany) Marvin Möller	(Japan) Jay Dylan Hara Friend (Denmark) Christian Sigsgaard	(Italy) Gabriele Pennaforti (Netherlands) Jarno Jans (Netherlands) Abel Forger (Denmark) Carl Emil Overbeck
June 30	Amstelveen, Netherlands; Clay; M15; Singles and doubles draws	(Japan) Jay Dylan Hara Friend (Denmark) Carl Emil Overbeck; 6–4, 3–6, [15–13]	(Netherlands) Brian Bozemoj (Netherlands) Stijn Pel	(Japan) Jay Dylan Hara Friend (Denmark) Christian Sigsgaard	(Italy) Gabriele Pennaforti (Netherlands) Jarno Jans (Netherlands) Abel Forger (Denmark) Carl Emil Overbeck
June 30	Štore, Slovenia; Clay; M15; Singles and doubles draws	(Slovenia) Bor Artnak; 6–3, 6–1	(Italy) Gianluca Cadenasso	(United Kingdom) Millen Hurrion (Hungary) Adam Jilly	(Portugal) Francisco Rocha (Italy) Luca Castagnola (Argentina) Lautaro Agustín Falabella (Brazil) Igor Marcondes
June 30	Štore, Slovenia; Clay; M15; Singles and doubles draws	(Luxembourg) Alex Knaff (Brazil) Igor Marcondes; 6–1, 6–4	(Italy) Gianluca Cadenasso (Italy) Alessio De Bernardis	(United Kingdom) Millen Hurrion (Hungary) Adam Jilly	(Portugal) Francisco Rocha (Italy) Luca Castagnola (Argentina) Lautaro Agustín Falabella (Brazil) Igor Marcondes
June 30	Kuršumlijska Banja, Serbia; Clay; M15; Singles and doubles draws	(Serbia) Zoran Ludoški; 7–6^{(7–3)}, 6–4	Denis Klok	(Serbia) Dušan Obradović (Serbia) Novak Novaković	(France) Andrej Loncarevic (Serbia) Stefan Popović; Aleksandr Lobanov (Serbia) Kristijan Juhas
June 30	Kuršumlijska Banja, Serbia; Clay; M15; Singles and doubles draws	(Germany) Maximilian Homberg (Greece) Ioannis Xilas; 6–7^{(5–7)}, 6–2, [10–6]	(Argentina) Lorenzo Gagliardo (Argentina) Sean Hess	(Serbia) Dušan Obradović (Serbia) Novak Novaković	(France) Andrej Loncarevic (Serbia) Stefan Popović; Aleksandr Lobanov (Serbia) Kristijan Juhas
June 30	Kayseri, Turkiye; Hard; M15; Singles and doubles draws	(Ukraine) Vadym Ursu; 5–7, 6–4, 7–6^{(11–9)}	(Turkey) Arda Azkara	(Germany) Nino Ehrenschneider (France) Nicolas Tepmahc	(Bermuda) Daniel Phillips; Semen Pankin (France) Constantin Bittoun Kouzmine (Iran) Ali Yazdani
June 30	Kayseri, Turkiye; Hard; M15; Singles and doubles draws	(Ukraine) Andriy Poritskyy (Ukraine) Vadym Ursu; 2–6, 7–5, [10–6]	Semen Pankin (Germany) Niklas Schell	(Germany) Nino Ehrenschneider (France) Nicolas Tepmahc	(Bermuda) Daniel Phillips; Semen Pankin (France) Constantin Bittoun Kouzmine (Iran) Ali Yazdani
June 30	Monastir, Tunisia; Hard; M15; Singles and doubles draws	(United States) Cooper Williams; 6–3, 7–5	(Italy) Luca Potenza	(Spain) Pablo Martínez Gómez (Egypt) Amr Elsayed	(Algeria) Mohamed Nazim Makhlouf (Egypt) Michael Bassem Sobhy (New Zealand) Ajeet Rai (Australia) Hayden Jones
June 30	Monastir, Tunisia; Hard; M15; Singles and doubles draws	(United Kingdom) Ewen Lumsden (Ghana) Isaac Nortey; 6–1, 1–6, [10–2]	(Italy) Riccardo Perin (Italy) Luca Potenza	(Spain) Pablo Martínez Gómez (Egypt) Amr Elsayed	(Algeria) Mohamed Nazim Makhlouf (Egypt) Michael Bassem Sobhy (New Zealand) Ajeet Rai (Australia) Hayden Jones
June 30	Tangier, Morocco; Clay; M15; Singles and doubles draws	(Morocco) Reda Bennani; 7–6^{(7–4)}, 6–4	(Morocco) Yassine Dlimi	(Spain) Alejandro Turriziani Álvarez (Spain) Mario González Fernández	(Argentina) Lucio Ratti (Italy) Massimo Giunta (Spain) David Naharro (Italy) Francesco Ferrari
June 30	Tangier, Morocco; Clay; M15; Singles and doubles draws	(Morocco) Younes Lalami Laaroussi (Switzerland) Damien Wenger; 6–3, 6–4	(Italy) Francesco Ferrari (Italy) Federico Valle	(Spain) Alejandro Turriziani Álvarez (Spain) Mario González Fernández	(Argentina) Lucio Ratti (Italy) Massimo Giunta (Spain) David Naharro (Italy) Francesco Ferrari
June 30	San Salvador de Jujuy, Argentina; Clay; M15; Singles and doubles draws	(Argentina) Lorenzo Joaquín Rodríguez; 6–1, 5–7, 6–4	(Argentina) Guido Iván Justo	(Argentina) Thiago Cigarrán (Argentina) Carlos María Zárate	(Brazil) Gustavo Ribeiro de Almeida (Uruguay) Federico Aguilar Cardozo (Brazil) Enzo Kohlmann de Freitas (Brazil) Pedro Rodrigues
June 30	San Salvador de Jujuy, Argentina; Clay; M15; Singles and doubles draws	(Uruguay) Federico Aguilar Cardozo (Argentina) Santiago de la Fuente; 6–3, 7–5	(Argentina) Leonardo Aboian (Argentina) Ignacio Monzón	(Argentina) Thiago Cigarrán (Argentina) Carlos María Zárate	(Brazil) Gustavo Ribeiro de Almeida (Uruguay) Federico Aguilar Cardozo (Brazil) Enzo Kohlmann de Freitas (Brazil) Pedro Rodrigues
June 30	Los Angeles, United States; Hard; M15; Singles and doubles draws	(United States) Kyle Kang; 7–5, 6–4	(Australia) Dane Sweeny	(United States) Noah Zamora (United States) Dominique Rolland	(United States) Miles Jones (United States) Isaiah Strode (United States) Hudson Rivera (United States) Ryan Dickerson
June 30	Los Angeles, United States; Hard; M15; Singles and doubles draws	(United States) Keshav Chopra (United States) Phillip Jordan; 6–4, 6–2	(United States) Govind Nanda (United States) Jamie Vance	(United States) Noah Zamora (United States) Dominique Rolland	(United States) Miles Jones (United States) Isaiah Strode (United States) Hudson Rivera (United States) Ryan Dickerson
