= 2025 ITF Men's World Tennis Tour (January–March) =

The 2025 ITF Men's World Tennis Tour is the 2025 edition of the second-tier tour for men's professional tennis. It is organised by the International Tennis Federation and is a tier below the ATP Challenger Tour. The ITF Men's World Tennis Tour includes tournaments with prize money ranging from $15,000 to $25,000.

Since 2022, following the Russian invasion of Ukraine the ITF announced that players from Belarus and Russia could still play on the tour but would not be allowed to play under the flag of Belarus or Russia.

== Key ==
M25 tournaments
M15 tournaments

== Month ==
=== January ===
Week of	Tournament	Winner	Runners-up	Semifinalists	Quarterfinalists
December 30	Indore, India; Hard; M25; Singles and doubles draws	(United Kingdom) Alastair Gray; 6–3, 1–1 ret.	(United States) Samir Banerjee	(France) Florent Bax (United Kingdom) Oliver Crawford	(France) Mathys Erhard; Egor Agafonov (Ukraine) Yurii Dzhavakian; Maxim Zhukov
December 30	Indore, India; Hard; M25; Singles and doubles draws	(India) Parikshit Somani (India) Dhakshineswar Suresh; Walkover	(France) Mathys Erhard (United Kingdom) Alastair Gray	(France) Florent Bax (United Kingdom) Oliver Crawford	(France) Mathys Erhard; Egor Agafonov (Ukraine) Yurii Dzhavakian; Maxim Zhukov
December 30	Bali, Indonesia; Hard; M25; Singles and doubles draws	(South Korea) Chung Hyeon; 6–1, 6–2	(United Kingdom) Giles Hussey	(Australia) Chase Ferguson (Japan) Hayato Matsuoka	(France) Antoine Escoffier (Tunisia) Moez Echargui (Chinese Taipei) Huang Tsung-hao (Japan) Shunsuke Nakagawa
December 30	Bali, Indonesia; Hard; M25; Singles and doubles draws	(Japan) Yusuke Kusuhara (Japan) Shunsuke Nakagawa; 6–2, 6–4	(Indonesia) Nathan Anthony Barki (Indonesia) Christopher Rungkat	(Australia) Chase Ferguson (Japan) Hayato Matsuoka	(France) Antoine Escoffier (Tunisia) Moez Echargui (Chinese Taipei) Huang Tsung-hao (Japan) Shunsuke Nakagawa
January 6	Hazebrouck, France; Hard (i); M25; Singles and doubles draws	(Belgium) Joris De Loore; 7–6^{(7–2)}, 6–7^{(5–7)}, 6–3	(France) Arthur Géa	(France) Maé Malige (Estonia) Daniil Glinka	(France) Mathias Bourgue (France) Axel Garcian (France) Pierre Delage (United States) Toby Kodat
January 6	Hazebrouck, France; Hard (i); M25; Singles and doubles draws	(France) Dan Added (France) Arthur Bouquier; 6–1, 6–0	(Bulgaria) Anthony Genov (Poland) Szymon Kielan	(France) Maé Malige (Estonia) Daniil Glinka	(France) Mathias Bourgue (France) Axel Garcian (France) Pierre Delage (United States) Toby Kodat
January 6	Bhopal, India; Hard; M25; Singles and doubles draws	(United Kingdom) Alastair Gray; 6–3, 6–4	Maxim Zhukov	(Ukraine) Eric Vanshelboim (India) Sidharth Rawat	(Switzerland) Luca Castelnuovo; Egor Agafonov (Uzbekistan) Sergey Fomin (India) S D Prajwal Dev
January 6	Bhopal, India; Hard; M25; Singles and doubles draws	(India) Chirag Duhan (India) Dev Javia; 4–6, 6–1, [10–2]	(South Korea) Jeong Yeong-seok (South Korea) Park Ui-sung	(Ukraine) Eric Vanshelboim (India) Sidharth Rawat	(Switzerland) Luca Castelnuovo; Egor Agafonov (Uzbekistan) Sergey Fomin (India) S D Prajwal Dev
January 6	Ithaca, United States; Hard (i); M25; Singles and doubles draws	(United States) Patrick Maloney; 7–6^{(7–5)}, 6–4	(France) Théo Papamalamis	(United States) Tyler Zink (United States) Alex Rybakov	(Canada) Justin Boulais (United States) Michael Zheng (Mexico) Alan Magadán (United States) Strong Kirchheimer
January 6	Ithaca, United States; Hard (i); M25; Singles and doubles draws	(United States) Patrick Maloney (United States) Joshua Sheehy; 6–4, 7–6^{(8–6)}	(United States) Pranav Kumar (United States) Noah Schachter	(United States) Tyler Zink (United States) Alex Rybakov	(Canada) Justin Boulais (United States) Michael Zheng (Mexico) Alan Magadán (United States) Strong Kirchheimer
January 6	Kingston, Jamaica; Hard; M15; Singles and doubles draws	(United States) Daniel Milavsky; 6–4, 6–7^{(4–7)}, 7–5	(France) Guillaume Dalmasso	(Romania) Sebastian Gima (United States) Andrew Fenty	(Canada) Dan Martin (United Kingdom) Blu Baker (United States) Gabriel Evans (United States) Maxwell McKennon
January 6	Kingston, Jamaica; Hard; M15; Singles and doubles draws	(Canada) Juan Carlos Aguilar (Australia) Kody Pearson; 6–3, 6–3	(Barbados) Darian King (Barbados) Stephen Slocombe	(Romania) Sebastian Gima (United States) Andrew Fenty	(Canada) Dan Martin (United Kingdom) Blu Baker (United States) Gabriel Evans (United States) Maxwell McKennon
January 6	Oslo, Norway; Hard; M15; Singles and doubles draws	(Poland) Olaf Pieczkowski; 7–6^{(9–7)}, 7–5	(France) Tom Paris	(Belgium) Tibo Colson (Poland) Filip Pieczonka	(Latvia) Robert Strombachs (Sweden) Adam Heinonen (Norway) Herman Hoeyeraal (Croatia) Vito Tonejc
January 6	Oslo, Norway; Hard; M15; Singles and doubles draws	(Sweden) Erik Grevelius (Sweden) Adam Heinonen; 6–4, 6–3	(Poland) Tomasz Berkieta (Germany) Marc Majdandzic	(Belgium) Tibo Colson (Poland) Filip Pieczonka	(Latvia) Robert Strombachs (Sweden) Adam Heinonen (Norway) Herman Hoeyeraal (Croatia) Vito Tonejc
January 6	Manacor, Spain; Hard; M15; Singles and doubles draws	(Spain) Pedro Vives Marcos; 7–5, 6–4	(Ukraine) Georgii Kravchenko	(United States) Collin Altamirano (Netherlands) Deney Wassermann	(India) Manas Dhamne (Brazil) Oscar José Gutierrez (Germany) Diego Dedura-Palomero (Spain) Sergio Callejón Hernando
January 6	Manacor, Spain; Hard; M15; Singles and doubles draws	(Spain) Iñaki Montes de la Torre (Latvia) Kārlis Ozoliņš; 3–6, 6–3, [10–5]	(Spain) Alberto Barroso Campos (Spain) Carlos López Montagud	(United States) Collin Altamirano (Netherlands) Deney Wassermann	(India) Manas Dhamne (Brazil) Oscar José Gutierrez (Germany) Diego Dedura-Palomero (Spain) Sergio Callejón Hernando
January 6	Monastir, Tunisia; Hard; M15; Singles and doubles draws	(Italy) Luca Potenza; 6–4, 3–6, 7–5	(Germany) Florian Broska	Petr Bar Biryukov (Germany) Nino Ehrenschneider	(Italy) Pietro Marino (France) Étienne Donnet (Cyprus) Melios Efstathiou (Italy) Giuseppe La Vela
January 6	Monastir, Tunisia; Hard; M15; Singles and doubles draws	(France) Charles Bertimon (France) Maxence Bertimon; 6–3, 6–2	(Italy) Pietro Marino (Italy) Luca Potenza	Petr Bar Biryukov (Germany) Nino Ehrenschneider	(Italy) Pietro Marino (France) Étienne Donnet (Cyprus) Melios Efstathiou (Italy) Giuseppe La Vela
January 6	Antalya, Turkiye; Clay; M15; Singles and doubles draws	(Spain) Carlos Sánchez Jover; 6–4, 7–5	(Czech Republic) Dominik Kellovský	(Romania) Ștefan Adrian Andreescu; Savva Polukhin	(Croatia) Josip Šimundža (Italy) Samuele Seghetti (France) Lucas Bouquet (Italy) Maximilian Figl
January 6	Antalya, Turkiye; Clay; M15; Singles and doubles draws	(Venezuela) Ignacio Parisca Romera (Spain) Carlos Sánchez Jover; 6–1, 1–6, [10–7]	(Chinese Taipei) Lee Kuan-yi (Chinese Taipei) Wang Kai-I	(Romania) Ștefan Adrian Andreescu; Savva Polukhin	(Croatia) Josip Šimundža (Italy) Samuele Seghetti (France) Lucas Bouquet (Italy) Maximilian Figl
January 13	Chennai, India; Hard; M25; Singles and doubles draws	(United Kingdom) Oliver Crawford; 5–7, 6–3, 7–6^{(7–5)}	(Ukraine) Eric Vanshelboim	Egor Agafonov (Greece) Stefanos Sakellaridis	(India) Manish Sureshkumar (Kazakhstan) Grigoriy Lomakin (Japan) Yusuke Takahashi (Ukraine) Yurii Dzhavakian
January 13	Chennai, India; Hard; M25; Singles and doubles draws	(India) Chirag Duhan (India) Dev Javia; 3–6, 6–3, [10–8]	(India) Ishaque Eqbal (India) Aryan Shah	Egor Agafonov (Greece) Stefanos Sakellaridis	(India) Manish Sureshkumar (Kazakhstan) Grigoriy Lomakin (Japan) Yusuke Takahashi (Ukraine) Yurii Dzhavakian
January 13	Santiago, Chile; Clay; M15; Singles and doubles draws	(Argentina) Hernán Casanova; 6–2, 4–6, 6–4	(Argentina) Guido Iván Justo	(Chile) Daniel Antonio Núñez (Chile) Bastián Malla	(Argentina) Juan Estévez (Argentina) Lorenzo Joaquín Rodríguez (Argentina) Juan Manuel La Serna (Germany) Louis Wessels
January 13	Santiago, Chile; Clay; M15; Singles and doubles draws	(Argentina) Juan Bautista Otegui (Argentina) Lorenzo Joaquín Rodríguez; 6–2, 6–4	(Chile) Benjamín Torrealba (Chile) Nicolás Villalón	(Chile) Daniel Antonio Núñez (Chile) Bastián Malla	(Argentina) Juan Estévez (Argentina) Lorenzo Joaquín Rodríguez (Argentina) Juan Manuel La Serna (Germany) Louis Wessels
January 13	Bressuire, France; Hard (i); M15; Singles and doubles draws	(France) Arthur Géa; 6–2, 6–2	(France) Maé Malige	(France) Cyril Vandermeersch (United States) Micah Braswell	(France) Tristan Lamasine (France) Pierre Antoine Faut (France) Dan Added (United States) Quinn Vandecasteele
January 13	Bressuire, France; Hard (i); M15; Singles and doubles draws	(France) Antoine Cornut-Chauvinc (France) Loris Pourroy; 6–2, 7–5	(France) Mathieu Scaglia (France) Cyril Vandermeersch	(France) Cyril Vandermeersch (United States) Micah Braswell	(France) Tristan Lamasine (France) Pierre Antoine Faut (France) Dan Added (United States) Quinn Vandecasteele
January 13	Cadolzburg, Germany; Carpet (i); M15; Singles and doubles draws	(Germany) Justin Engel; 7–6^{(7–2)}, 6–3	(United Kingdom) Hamish Stewart	(Germany) Max Wiskandt (Germany) Aaron Funk	(Germany) Vincent Marysko; Evgeny Karlovskiy (Germany) Christian Djonov (Germany) Kai Wehnelt
January 13	Cadolzburg, Germany; Carpet (i); M15; Singles and doubles draws	(Germany) Jannik Opitz (Germany) Tom Zeuch; 6–2, 6–1	(Czech Republic) Matyáš Černý (Czech Republic) Matthew William Donald	(Germany) Max Wiskandt (Germany) Aaron Funk	(Germany) Vincent Marysko; Evgeny Karlovskiy (Germany) Christian Djonov (Germany) Kai Wehnelt
January 13	Kingston, Jamaica; Hard; M15; Singles and doubles draws	(Canada) Juan Carlos Aguilar; 7–5, 6–2	(United States) Andres Martin	(Mexico) Rafael Alfonso de Alba Valdes (United States) Maxwell McKennon	(United States) Evan Zhu (United Kingdom) Blu Baker (Romania) Sebastian Gima (Bolivia) Raúl García
January 13	Kingston, Jamaica; Hard; M15; Singles and doubles draws	(Canada) Juan Carlos Aguilar (Australia) Kody Pearson; 7–6^{(7–3)}, 6–2	(Bolivia) Raúl García (Colombia) Miguel Tobón	(Mexico) Rafael Alfonso de Alba Valdes (United States) Maxwell McKennon	(United States) Evan Zhu (United Kingdom) Blu Baker (Romania) Sebastian Gima (Bolivia) Raúl García
January 13	Doha, Qatar; Hard; M15; Singles and doubles draws	(Sweden) Leo Borg; 6–1, 3–6, 7–6^{(7–5)}	(Belgium) Tibo Colson	(Turkey) Cem İlkel (Romania) Luca Preda	(Bulgaria) Yanaki Milev (Czech Republic) Hynek Bartoň (Georgia (country)) Aleksandre Bakshi (Bulgaria) Petr Nesterov
January 13	Doha, Qatar; Hard; M15; Singles and doubles draws	(Romania) Gabi Adrian Boitan (Romania) Bogdan Pavel; 6–1, 6–2	(Bulgaria) Yanaki Milev (Bulgaria) Petr Nesterov	(Turkey) Cem İlkel (Romania) Luca Preda	(Bulgaria) Yanaki Milev (Czech Republic) Hynek Bartoň (Georgia (country)) Aleksandre Bakshi (Bulgaria) Petr Nesterov
January 13	Manacor, Spain; Hard; M15; Singles and doubles draws	(Colombia) Adrià Soriano Barrera; 7–5, 2–6, 6–4	(Netherlands) Ryan Nijboer	(Spain) Miguel Damas (Italy) Federico Iannaccone	(Spain) Nicolás Álvarez Varona (Netherlands) Mees Röttgering (Spain) Sergio Callejon Hernando; Yaroslav Demin
January 13	Manacor, Spain; Hard; M15; Singles and doubles draws	(Netherlands) Michiel de Krom (Netherlands) Ryan Nijboer; 3–6, 7–6^{(7–4)}, [10–7]	(Italy) Fausto Tabacco (Italy) Giorgio Tabacco	(Spain) Miguel Damas (Italy) Federico Iannaccone	(Spain) Nicolás Álvarez Varona (Netherlands) Mees Röttgering (Spain) Sergio Callejon Hernando; Yaroslav Demin
January 13	Monastir, Tunisia; Hard; M15; Singles and doubles draws	(France) Laurent Lokoli; 6–2, 7–5	(Czech Republic) Tadeáš Paroulek	(France) Etienne Donnet (Italy) Luca Potenza	(Ivory Coast) Eliakim Coulibaly (Croatia) Nikola Bašić (Belgium) Gilles-Arnaud Bailly (Italy) Gianmarco Ferrari
January 13	Monastir, Tunisia; Hard; M15; Singles and doubles draws	(Italy) Gianluca Cadenasso (Italy) Pietro Marino; 5–7, 6–4, [10–8]	(France) Charles Bertimon (France) Maxence Bertimon	(France) Etienne Donnet (Italy) Luca Potenza	(Ivory Coast) Eliakim Coulibaly (Croatia) Nikola Bašić (Belgium) Gilles-Arnaud Bailly (Italy) Gianmarco Ferrari
January 13	Antalya, Turkiye; Clay; M15; Singles and doubles draws	(Spain) Carlos Sánchez Jover; 6–3, 7–6^{(8–6)}	(Switzerland) Kilian Feldbausch	Andrey Chepelev (Finland) Eero Vasa	(Turkey) Mert Naci Türker (Venezuela) Ignacio Parisca Romera (Serbia) Marko Maksimović (Mexico) Alex Hernández
January 13	Antalya, Turkiye; Clay; M15; Singles and doubles draws	(Switzerland) Kilian Feldbausch (Mexico) Rodrigo Pacheco Méndez; 3–6, 6–2, [10–5]	(Czech Republic) Vít Kalina (Ukraine) Nikita Mashtakov	Andrey Chepelev (Finland) Eero Vasa	(Turkey) Mert Naci Türker (Venezuela) Ignacio Parisca Romera (Serbia) Marko Maksimović (Mexico) Alex Hernández
January 20	Nußloch, Germany; Carpet (i); M25; Singles and doubles draws	(France) Tom Paris; 6–4, 6–4	(Ukraine) Oleg Prihodko	(Latvia) Robert Strombachs (Germany) Justin Engel	(France) Dan Added (United Kingdom) Finn Bass (Germany) Mats Rosenkranz (Germany) Tom Gentzsch
January 20	Nußloch, Germany; Carpet (i); M25; Singles and doubles draws	(Sweden) Erik Grevelius (Sweden) Adam Heinonen; 7–6^{(7–3)}, 6–3	(Bulgaria) Anthony Genov (Poland) Szymon Kielan	(Latvia) Robert Strombachs (Germany) Justin Engel	(France) Dan Added (United Kingdom) Finn Bass (Germany) Mats Rosenkranz (Germany) Tom Gentzsch
January 20	Sunderland, Great Britain; Hard (i); M25; Singles and doubles draws	(United Kingdom) Johannus Monday; 6–4, 6–2	(United Kingdom) Ryan Peniston	(United States) Micah Braswell (Austria) Dennis Novak	(United Kingdom) George Loffhagen (United Kingdom) Giles Hussey (Italy) Alessandro Pecci (United Kingdom) Alastair Gray
January 20	Sunderland, Great Britain; Hard (i); M25; Singles and doubles draws	(Czech Republic) David Poljak (United Kingdom) Hamish Stewart; Walkover	(United Kingdom) Giles Hussey (United Kingdom) James Story	(United States) Micah Braswell (Austria) Dennis Novak	(United Kingdom) George Loffhagen (United Kingdom) Giles Hussey (Italy) Alessandro Pecci (United Kingdom) Alastair Gray
January 20	Esch-sur-Alzette, Luxembourg; Hard (i); M25; Singles and doubles draws	(Sweden) Mikael Ymer; 6–1, 5–7, 6–2	(Norway) Nicolai Budkov Kjær	(Luxembourg) Chris Rodesch (Estonia) Daniil Glinka	(France) Mathias Bourgue (Germany) Patrick Zahraj (Slovakia) Norbert Gombos (Ukraine) Illya Beloborodko
January 20	Esch-sur-Alzette, Luxembourg; Hard (i); M25; Singles and doubles draws	(Austria) Sandro Kopp (Czech Republic) Michael Vrbenský; 3–6, 7–6^{(7–2)}, [10–3]	(Bulgaria) Alexander Donski (Spain) Bruno Pujol Navarro	(Luxembourg) Chris Rodesch (Estonia) Daniil Glinka	(France) Mathias Bourgue (Germany) Patrick Zahraj (Slovakia) Norbert Gombos (Ukraine) Illya Beloborodko
January 20	Doha, Qatar; Hard; M25; Singles and doubles draws	(Spain) Daniel Mérida; 6–4, 6–2	(Belgium) Tibo Colson	Marat Sharipov (Czech Republic) Hynek Bartoň	(Bulgaria) Petr Nesterov (Turkey) Mert Alkaya (Turkey) Cem İlkel; Kirill Kivattsev
January 20	Doha, Qatar; Hard; M25; Singles and doubles draws	(Belgium) Tibo Colson (Netherlands) Thijmen Loof; 7–6^{(7–5)}, 6–4	(Japan) Yuta Kikuchi (Japan) Naoki Tajima	Marat Sharipov (Czech Republic) Hynek Bartoň	(Bulgaria) Petr Nesterov (Turkey) Mert Alkaya (Turkey) Cem İlkel; Kirill Kivattsev
January 20	Santiago, Chile; Clay; M15; Singles and doubles draws	(Argentina) Lorenzo Joaquín Rodriguez; 6–4, 3–6, 6–4	(Argentina) Nicolás Kicker	(Chile) Bastián Malla (Brazil) João Eduardo Schiessl	(Argentina) Hernán Casanova (Argentina) Fernando Cavallo (United States) Bruno Kuzuhara (Argentina) Santiago de la Fuente
January 20	Santiago, Chile; Clay; M15; Singles and doubles draws	(Argentina) Juan Bautista Otegui (Argentina) Lorenzo Joaquín Rodríguez; 4–6, 6–3, [10–6]	(Brazil) Ryan Augusto dos Santos (Brazil) João Eduardo Schiessl	(Chile) Bastián Malla (Brazil) João Eduardo Schiessl	(Argentina) Hernán Casanova (Argentina) Fernando Cavallo (United States) Bruno Kuzuhara (Argentina) Santiago de la Fuente
January 20	Bagnoles-de-l'Orne, France; Clay (i); M15; Singles and doubles draws	(Italy) Filippo Romano; 7–6^{(8–6)}, 6–0	(France) Lucas Bouquet	(France) Lucas Marionneau (France) Axel Garcian	(France) Clément Tabur (France) Adan Freire Da Silva (France) Adrien Gobat (Germany) John Sperle
January 20	Bagnoles-de-l'Orne, France; Clay (i); M15; Singles and doubles draws	(Italy) Filippo Romano (Italy) Leonardo Taddia; 6–4, 6–4	(France) Axel Garcian (France) Arthur Nagel	(France) Lucas Marionneau (France) Axel Garcian	(France) Clément Tabur (France) Adan Freire Da Silva (France) Adrien Gobat (Germany) John Sperle
January 20	Manacor, Spain; Hard; M15; Singles and doubles draws	(Japan) Naoya Honda; 6–3, 6–3	(Italy) Fausto Tabacco	(Netherlands) Michiel de Krom; Yaroslav Demin	(Spain) Sergio Callejon Hernando (Spain) Alberto Barroso Campos (United States) Felix Corwin (Colombia) Adrià Soriano Barrera
January 20	Manacor, Spain; Hard; M15; Singles and doubles draws	Yaroslav Demin; Daniil Sarksian; 4–6, 6–4, [10–8]	(Spain) Ignasi Forcano (Morocco) Younes Lalami Laaroussi	(Netherlands) Michiel de Krom; Yaroslav Demin	(Spain) Sergio Callejon Hernando (Spain) Alberto Barroso Campos (United States) Felix Corwin (Colombia) Adrià Soriano Barrera
January 20	Monastir, Tunisia; Hard; M15; Singles and doubles draws	(Tunisia) Moez Echargui; 3–6, 6–4, 7–5	(Belgium) Gilles-Arnaud Bailly	(Italy) Michele Ribecai (France) Sean Cuenin	(Italy) Gianluca Cadenasso (Czech Republic) Tadeáš Paroulek (Italy) Luca Potenza (United States) Ulises Blanch
January 20	Monastir, Tunisia; Hard; M15; Singles and doubles draws	(Italy) Gianluca Cadenasso (Italy) Luca Potenza; 7–5, 6–1	(Ukraine) Vladyslav Orlov (Tunisia) Aziz Ouakaa	(Italy) Michele Ribecai (France) Sean Cuenin	(Italy) Gianluca Cadenasso (Czech Republic) Tadeáš Paroulek (Italy) Luca Potenza (United States) Ulises Blanch
January 20	Antalya, Turkiye; Clay; M15; Singles and doubles draws	(Italy) Gabriele Piraino; 6–4, 6–3	(Switzerland) Kilian Feldbausch	(Ukraine) Oleksii Krutykh (Bosnia and Herzegovina) Mirza Bašić	(Romania) Nicholas David Ionel (Italy) Gabriele Pennaforti (Spain) Carles Córdoba (Mexico) Rodrigo Pacheco Méndez
January 20	Antalya, Turkiye; Clay; M15; Singles and doubles draws	(Turkey) Gökberk Sarıtaş (Turkey) Mert Naci Türker; 3–6, 7–6^{(7–4)}, [12–10]	(Mexico) Alex Hernández (Mexico) Rodrigo Pacheco Méndez	(Ukraine) Oleksii Krutykh (Bosnia and Herzegovina) Mirza Bašić	(Romania) Nicholas David Ionel (Italy) Gabriele Pennaforti (Spain) Carles Córdoba (Mexico) Rodrigo Pacheco Méndez
January 27	Glasgow, Great Britain; Hard (i); M25; Singles and doubles draws	(United Kingdom) Alastair Gray; 6–4, 6–3	(United Kingdom) Millen Hurrion	(United Kingdom) Henry Searle (United Kingdom) George Loffhagen	(Italy) Federico Bondioli (United Kingdom) Toby Martin (Australia) Blake Mott (United Kingdom) James Story
January 27	Glasgow, Great Britain; Hard (i); M25; Singles and doubles draws	(United Kingdom) Finn Bass (United Kingdom) James Story; 6–2, 3–6, [10–7]	(Belgium) Romain Faucon (Slovakia) Lukáš Pokorný	(United Kingdom) Henry Searle (United Kingdom) George Loffhagen	(Italy) Federico Bondioli (United Kingdom) Toby Martin (Australia) Blake Mott (United Kingdom) James Story
January 27	Antalya, Turkiye; Clay; M25; Singles and doubles draws	(Czech Republic) Zdeněk Kolář; 6–3, 2–6, 6–1	(Netherlands) Guy den Ouden	(Poland) Daniel Michalski (Italy) Alexander Weis	(Germany) Tim Handel (Serbia) Stefan Popović (Italy) Andrea Picchione (Czech Republic) Dominik Kellovský
January 27	Antalya, Turkiye; Clay; M25; Singles and doubles draws	(Czech Republic) Zdeněk Kolář (Croatia) Nino Serdarušić; 6–3, 7–6^{(7–4)}	(Italy) Manuel Mazza (Italy) Andrea Picchione	(Poland) Daniel Michalski (Italy) Alexander Weis	(Germany) Tim Handel (Serbia) Stefan Popović (Italy) Andrea Picchione (Czech Republic) Dominik Kellovský
January 27	Sharm El Sheikh, Egypt; Hard; M15; Singles and doubles draws	(Italy) Alexandr Binda; 3–6, 6–2, 6–4	(France) Louis Dussin	Kirill Kivattsev (Czech Republic) Martin Krumich	Erik Arutiunian (Germany) Adrian Oetzbach (Austria) Nico Hipfl (France) Felix Balshaw
January 27	Sharm El Sheikh, Egypt; Hard; M15; Singles and doubles draws	Aliaksandr Liaonenka; Alexander Zgirovsky; 7–5, 6–3	Erik Arutiunian; Daniil Ostapenkov	Kirill Kivattsev (Czech Republic) Martin Krumich	Erik Arutiunian (Germany) Adrian Oetzbach (Austria) Nico Hipfl (France) Felix Balshaw
January 27	Zahra, Kuwait; Hard; M15; Singles and doubles draws	(Germany) Lucas Gerch; 2–6, 6–4, 6–4	(United Kingdom) Oliver Crawford	(Switzerland) Johan Nikles (Belgium) Tibo Colson	(Spain) Andrés Fernández Cánovas (Algeria) Samir Hamza Reguig (France) Maxence Beaugé (United Kingdom) Ali Habib
January 27	Zahra, Kuwait; Hard; M15; Singles and doubles draws	(Germany) Lucas Gerch (Germany) Kai Wehnelt; 7–5, 7–5	(France) Maxence Beaugé (France) Joris Moret	(Switzerland) Johan Nikles (Belgium) Tibo Colson	(Spain) Andrés Fernández Cánovas (Algeria) Samir Hamza Reguig (France) Maxence Beaugé (United Kingdom) Ali Habib
January 27	Huamantla, Mexico; Hard; M15; Singles and doubles draws	(United States) Alfredo Perez; 6–2, 6–2	(France) Enzo Wallart	(United States) Isaiah Strode (United States) Ryan Fishback	(Canada) Alvin Nicholas Tudorica (Colombia) Juan Sebastián Osorio (Canada) Dan Martin (Colombia) Johan Alexander Rodríguez
January 27	Huamantla, Mexico; Hard; M15; Singles and doubles draws	(Canada) Dan Martin (France) Enzo Wallart; 7–5, 2–6, [10–8]	(Colombia) Samuel Heredia (Colombia) Juan Sebastián Osorio	(United States) Isaiah Strode (United States) Ryan Fishback	(Canada) Alvin Nicholas Tudorica (Colombia) Juan Sebastián Osorio (Canada) Dan Martin (Colombia) Johan Alexander Rodríguez
January 27	Monastir, Tunisia; Hard; M15; Singles and doubles draws	(Belgium) Gilles-Arnaud Bailly; 6–4, 6–2	(Serbia) Branko Đurić	(Italy) Luca Potenza (United States) Darwin Blanch	(Germany) Mika Petkovic (France) Maé Malige; Igor Kudriashov (France) Arthur Reymond
January 27	Monastir, Tunisia; Hard; M15; Singles and doubles draws	(Spain) Mario González Fernández; Igor Kudriashov; 6–4, 7–6^{(7–3)}	(China) Zhang Linghao (China) Zheng Zhan	(Italy) Luca Potenza (United States) Darwin Blanch	(Germany) Mika Petkovic (France) Maé Malige; Igor Kudriashov (France) Arthur Reymond
January 27	Palm Coast, United States; Clay; M15; Singles and doubles draws	(United States) Garrett Johns; 7–5, 6–7^{(4–7)}, 6–2	(Romania) Sebastian Gima	(Serbia) Aleksa Ćirić (Germany) Marlon Vankan	(France) Louis Tessa (Serbia) Saša Marković (Germany) Louis Wessels (United States) Miles Jones
January 27	Palm Coast, United States; Clay; M15; Singles and doubles draws	(Luxembourg) Louis Van Herck (Germany) Marlon Vankan; 1–6, 6–4, [10–4]	(United States) Lucas Horve (United Kingdom) Oliver Okonkwo	(Serbia) Aleksa Ćirić (Germany) Marlon Vankan	(France) Louis Tessa (Serbia) Saša Marković (Germany) Louis Wessels (United States) Miles Jones

=== February ===
Week of	Tournament	Winner	Runners-up	Semifinalists	Quarterfinalists
February 3	Antalya, Turkiye; Clay; M25; Singles and doubles draws	(Poland) Daniel Michalski; 7–6^{(7–5)}, 6–1	(Czech Republic) Zdeněk Kolář	(Mexico) Rodrigo Pacheco Méndez (Italy) Gabriele Piraino	(Italy) Manuel Mazza (Austria) Neil Oberleitner (Serbia) Stefan Popović (Germany) John Sperle
February 3	Antalya, Turkiye; Clay; M25; Singles and doubles draws	(Czech Republic) Zdeněk Kolář (Croatia) Nino Serdarušić; 6–0, 6–2	(Romania) Gabriel Ghețu; Ivan Gretskiy	(Mexico) Rodrigo Pacheco Méndez (Italy) Gabriele Piraino	(Italy) Manuel Mazza (Austria) Neil Oberleitner (Serbia) Stefan Popović (Germany) John Sperle
February 3	Sharm El Sheikh, Egypt; Hard; M15; Singles and doubles draws	(Georgia (country)) Saba Purtseladze; 6–7^{(5–7)}, 7–6^{(7–3)}, 6–3	(Czech Republic) Martin Krumich	Ilia Simakin (Romania) Gabi Adrian Boitan	(Italy) Alexandr Binda; Evgeny Philippov; Daniil Ostapenkov (Germany) Adrian Oetzbach
February 3	Sharm El Sheikh, Egypt; Hard; M15; Singles and doubles draws	Erik Arutiunian; Daniil Ostapenkov; 6–2, 4–6, [10–6]	(France) Pierre Delage (France) Louis Dussin	Ilia Simakin (Romania) Gabi Adrian Boitan	(Italy) Alexandr Binda; Evgeny Philippov; Daniil Ostapenkov (Germany) Adrian Oetzbach
February 3	Zahra, Kuwait; Hard; M15; Singles and doubles draws	(Turkey) Cem İlkel; 6–1, 6–1	(Switzerland) Johan Nikles	(Turkey) Tuncay Duran (Turkey) Mert Alkaya	(France) Maxence Beaugé (France) Valentin Lapalu (Netherlands) Abel Forger; Evgeny Karlovskiy
February 3	Zahra, Kuwait; Hard; M15; Singles and doubles draws	(Germany) Lucas Gerch (Germany) Kai Wehnelt; 6–2, 7–6^{(8–6)}	Daniil Sarksian (Belgium) Martin van der Meerschen	(Turkey) Tuncay Duran (Turkey) Mert Alkaya	(France) Maxence Beaugé (France) Valentin Lapalu (Netherlands) Abel Forger; Evgeny Karlovskiy
February 3	Huamantla, Mexico; Hard; M15; Singles and doubles draws	(United States) Alfredo Perez; 6–4, 6–1	(Canada) Alvin Nicholas Tudorica	(Dominican Republic) Peter Bertran (New Zealand) Kiranpal Pannu	(Canada) Mikael Arseneault (United States) Noah Schachter (United Kingdom) Aidan McHugh (United States) Elijah Strode
February 3	Huamantla, Mexico; Hard; M15; Singles and doubles draws	(United States) Pranav Kumar (United States) Noah Schachter; 6–3, 7–6^{(7–2)}	(Republic of Ireland) Charles Barry (United Kingdom) Aidan McHugh	(Dominican Republic) Peter Bertran (New Zealand) Kiranpal Pannu	(Canada) Mikael Arseneault (United States) Noah Schachter (United Kingdom) Aidan McHugh (United States) Elijah Strode
February 3	Valencia, Spain; Clay; M15; Singles and doubles draws	(Spain) Max Alcalá Gurri; 3–6, 6–4, 6–4	(Italy) Gabriele Pennaforti	(Spain) Diego Augusto Barreto Sanchez (France) Maxime Chazal	(Spain) Àlex Martí Pujolras (Spain) Carlos López Montagud (Netherlands) Michiel de Krom (Spain) Alejandro Manzanera Pertusa
February 3	Valencia, Spain; Clay; M15; Singles and doubles draws	(Spain) Carles Córdoba (Spain) Andrés Santamarta Roig; 6–4, 6–2	(Spain) Alvaro Bueno Gil (Spain) Mario Mansilla Díez	(Spain) Diego Augusto Barreto Sanchez (France) Maxime Chazal	(Spain) Àlex Martí Pujolras (Spain) Carlos López Montagud (Netherlands) Michiel de Krom (Spain) Alejandro Manzanera Pertusa
February 3	Monastir, Tunisia; Hard; M15; Singles and doubles draws	(India) Manas Dhamne; 2–6, 6–0, 6–2	(Italy) Lorenzo Carboni	(Spain) Alberto Barroso Campos (United States) Karl Poling	(Italy) Fabrizio Andaloro (Austria) Maximilian Neuchrist (Spain) Mario González Fernández (Czech Republic) Maxim Mrva
February 3	Monastir, Tunisia; Hard; M15; Singles and doubles draws	(Spain) Alberto Barroso Campos (Tunisia) Aziz Ouakaa; 6–4, 5–7, [10–7]	(Republic of Ireland) Cian Maguire (Greece) Dimitris Sakellaridis	(Spain) Alberto Barroso Campos (United States) Karl Poling	(Italy) Fabrizio Andaloro (Austria) Maximilian Neuchrist (Spain) Mario González Fernández (Czech Republic) Maxim Mrva
February 3	Sunrise, United States; Clay; M15; Singles and doubles draws	(United States) Bruno Kuzuhara; 6–1, 6–2	(United States) Garrett Johns	(Argentina) Lorenzo Joaquín Rodriguez (United States) Tyler Zink	(France) Lucas Bouquet (United States) Andres Martin (Mexico) Ernesto Escobedo (United States) Patrick Maloney
February 3	Sunrise, United States; Clay; M15; Singles and doubles draws	(Canada) Juan Carlos Aguilar (Canada) Taha Baadi; 4–6, 6–2, [10–4]	(United States) Alex Jones (United States) Miles Jones	(Argentina) Lorenzo Joaquín Rodriguez (United States) Tyler Zink	(France) Lucas Bouquet (United States) Andres Martin (Mexico) Ernesto Escobedo (United States) Patrick Maloney
February 10	Roehampton, Great Britain; Hard (i); M25; Singles and doubles draws	(United Kingdom) Arthur Fery; 6–4, 6–4	(United Kingdom) George Loffhagen	(United Kingdom) Anton Matusevich (United Kingdom) Liam Broady	(Germany) Max Wiskandt (France) Lucas Poullain (United Kingdom) Ben Jones (United States) Keegan Smith
February 10	Roehampton, Great Britain; Hard (i); M25; Singles and doubles draws	(South Africa) Philip Henning (United Kingdom) Ben Jones; 6–4, 6–3	(United Kingdom) Tom Hands (United Kingdom) Harry Wendelken	(United Kingdom) Anton Matusevich (United Kingdom) Liam Broady	(Germany) Max Wiskandt (France) Lucas Poullain (United Kingdom) Ben Jones (United States) Keegan Smith
February 10	Timaru, New Zealand; Hard; M25; Singles and doubles draws	(United States) Christian Langmo; 7–6^{(8–6)}, 6–3	(Chinese Taipei) Hsu Yu-hsiou	(Australia) Moerani Bouzige (Japan) Naoki Nakagawa	(United States) Govind Nanda (New Zealand) Alexander Klintcharov (United States) Joshua Sheehy (New Zealand) Ajeet Rai
February 10	Timaru, New Zealand; Hard; M25; Singles and doubles draws	(Japan) Yuichiro Inui (Japan) Yuta Kikuchi; 6–3, 4–6, [10–7]	(Australia) Kody Pearson (United States) Joshua Sheehy	(Australia) Moerani Bouzige (Japan) Naoki Nakagawa	(United States) Govind Nanda (New Zealand) Alexander Klintcharov (United States) Joshua Sheehy (New Zealand) Ajeet Rai
February 10	Vila Real de Santo António, Portugal; Hard; M25; Singles and doubles draws	(Portugal) Frederico Ferreira Silva; 4–6, 6–1, 7–6^{(14–12)}	(Austria) Sandro Kopp	(Portugal) Gastão Elias (Romania) Cezar Crețu	(Spain) Tomás Currás Abasolo (Slovakia) Martin Kližan (Croatia) Mili Poljičak; Ivan Gakhov
February 10	Vila Real de Santo António, Portugal; Hard; M25; Singles and doubles draws	(Serbia) Stefan Latinović (Croatia) Mili Poljičak; 6–4, 4–6, [10–6]	(Uzbekistan) Sergey Fomin; Ivan Gakhov	(Portugal) Gastão Elias (Romania) Cezar Crețu	(Spain) Tomás Currás Abasolo (Slovakia) Martin Kližan (Croatia) Mili Poljičak; Ivan Gakhov
February 10	Punta del Este, Uruguay; Clay; M25; Singles and doubles draws	(Paraguay) Daniel Vallejo; 6–1, 6–4	(Argentina) Luciano Emanuel Ambrogi	(Argentina) Santiago Rodríguez Taverna (Brazil) Pedro Boscardin Dias	(Argentina) Renzo Olivo (Spain) Nikolás Sánchez Izquierdo (Ecuador) Álvaro Guillén Meza (Brazil) Matheus Pucinelli de Almeida
February 10	Punta del Este, Uruguay; Clay; M25; Singles and doubles draws	(Argentina) Hernán Casanova (Argentina) Santiago Rodríguez Taverna; 7–5, 5–7, [10–1]	(Argentina) Alex Barrena (Argentina) Renzo Olivo	(Argentina) Santiago Rodríguez Taverna (Brazil) Pedro Boscardin Dias	(Argentina) Renzo Olivo (Spain) Nikolás Sánchez Izquierdo (Ecuador) Álvaro Guillén Meza (Brazil) Matheus Pucinelli de Almeida
February 10	Sharm El Sheikh, Egypt; Hard; M15; Singles and doubles draws	Erik Arutiunian; 6–0 ret.	(Georgia (country)) Saba Purtseladze	(Poland) Martyn Pawelski; Daniil Ostapenkov	(Italy) Lorenzo Sciahbasi (Poland) Filip Peliwo (Italy) Federico Bondioli (Slovakia) Michal Krajčí
February 10	Sharm El Sheikh, Egypt; Hard; M15; Singles and doubles draws	(Italy) Federico Bondioli (Italy) Carlo Alberto Caniato; 7–5, 6–2	(Italy) Gregorio Biondolillo (Italy) Lorenzo Sciahbasi	(Poland) Martyn Pawelski; Daniil Ostapenkov	(Italy) Lorenzo Sciahbasi (Poland) Filip Peliwo (Italy) Federico Bondioli (Slovakia) Michal Krajčí
February 10	Oberhaching, Germany; Hard (i); M15; Singles and doubles draws	(Germany) Mats Rosenkranz; 6–1, 6–2	(Germany) Marvin Möller	(Germany) Cedrik-Marcel Stebe (Hungary) Péter Fajta	(Bulgaria) Iliyan Radulov (Germany) Diego Dedura-Palomero (United States) Martin Damm; Yaroslav Demin
February 10	Oberhaching, Germany; Hard (i); M15; Singles and doubles draws	(Slovakia) Miloš Karol (Italy) Giovanni Oradini; 6–3, 6–3	(Germany) Aaron Funk (Germany) Mika Petkovic	(Germany) Cedrik-Marcel Stebe (Hungary) Péter Fajta	(Bulgaria) Iliyan Radulov (Germany) Diego Dedura-Palomero (United States) Martin Damm; Yaroslav Demin
February 10	Huamantla, Mexico; Hard; M15; Singles and doubles draws	(Canada) Alvin Nicholas Tudorica; 6–2, 1–6, 6–1	(United Kingdom) Aidan McHugh	(Canada) Niels Peter Van Noord (United States) Alfredo Perez	(Canada) Nicolas Arseneault (United States) Noah Schachter (United States) Maxwell McKennon (Canada) Dan Martin
February 10	Huamantla, Mexico; Hard; M15; Singles and doubles draws	(Republic of Ireland) Charles Barry (United Kingdom) Aidan McHugh; 7–6^{(8–6)}, 6–2	(Mexico) Rafael Alonso de Alba Valdés (Mexico) Alejandro Hayen	(Canada) Niels Peter Van Noord (United States) Alfredo Perez	(Canada) Nicolas Arseneault (United States) Noah Schachter (United States) Maxwell McKennon (Canada) Dan Martin
February 10	Bucharest, Romania; Hard (i); M15; Singles and doubles draws	(United Kingdom) Hamish Stewart; 7–6^{(8–6)}, 7–6^{(7–2)}	(Germany) Nino Ehrenschneider	(Bulgaria) Petr Nesterov (France) Loann Massard	(France) Dan Added (Italy) Andrea Guerrieri (France) Robin Catry (Netherlands) Daniel de Jonge
February 10	Bucharest, Romania; Hard (i); M15; Singles and doubles draws	(Italy) Filippo Romano (Germany) Kai Wehnelt; 6–4, 6–4	(United Kingdom) Emile Hudd (United Kingdom) Hamish Stewart	(Bulgaria) Petr Nesterov (France) Loann Massard	(France) Dan Added (Italy) Andrea Guerrieri (France) Robin Catry (Netherlands) Daniel de Jonge
February 10	Valencia, Spain; Clay; M15; Singles and doubles draws	(Spain) Carlos Sánchez Jover; 2–4 ret.	(Spain) Max Alcalá Gurri	(Spain) Carlos López Montagud (Italy) Gabriele Pennaforti	Svyatoslav Gulin (Italy) Gabriele Piraino (Spain) Manel Lazaro Juncadella (Spain) Àlex Martí Pujolràs
February 10	Valencia, Spain; Clay; M15; Singles and doubles draws	(Spain) Mario Mansilla Díez (Spain) Benjamín Winter López; 6–1, 6–2	(Spain) Carlos Sánchez Jover (Spain) Andrés Santamarta Roig	(Spain) Carlos López Montagud (Italy) Gabriele Pennaforti	Svyatoslav Gulin (Italy) Gabriele Piraino (Spain) Manel Lazaro Juncadella (Spain) Àlex Martí Pujolràs
February 10	Monastir, Tunisia; Hard; M15; Singles and doubles draws	(Tunisia) Moez Echargui; 6–3, 6–2	(France) Nicolas Tepmahc	(Ukraine) Vladyslav Orlov (France) Kenny de Schepper	(Italy) Fabrizio Andaloro (Italy) Fausto Tabacco (Ukraine) Georgii Kravchenko (India) Manas Dhamne
February 10	Monastir, Tunisia; Hard; M15; Singles and doubles draws	(Czech Republic) Matthew William Donald (Czech Republic) Tadeas Paroulek; 7–6^{(7–5)}, 6–2	(Spain) Alberto Barroso Campos (Spain) Ignasi Forcano	(Ukraine) Vladyslav Orlov (France) Kenny de Schepper	(Italy) Fabrizio Andaloro (Italy) Fausto Tabacco (Ukraine) Georgii Kravchenko (India) Manas Dhamne
February 10	Antalya, Turkiye; Clay; M15; Singles and doubles draws	(Australia) Akira Santillan; 6–1, 6–1	(Serbia) Stefan Popović	(Serbia) Dušan Obradović (Bosnia and Herzegovina) Andrej Nedić	(Austria) Neil Oberleitner (Germany) John Sperle (Serbia) Marko Maksimović (Italy) Manuel Mazza
February 10	Antalya, Turkiye; Clay; M15; Singles and doubles draws	(Serbia) Marko Maksimović (Serbia) Stefan Popović; 6–3, 5–7, [10–8]	(Italy) Giuseppe La Vela (Italy) Pietro Marino	(Serbia) Dušan Obradović (Bosnia and Herzegovina) Andrej Nedić	(Austria) Neil Oberleitner (Germany) John Sperle (Serbia) Marko Maksimović (Italy) Manuel Mazza
February 10	Naples, United States; Clay; M15; Singles and doubles draws	(United States) Garrett Johns; 6–4, 6–4	(Argentina) Lorenzo Joaquín Rodriguez	(Argentina) Ignacio Monzón (Italy) Tommaso Compagnucci	(United States) Bruno Kuzuhara (United States) Cannon Kingsley (United States) Patrick Maloney (United States) Andres Martin
February 10	Naples, United States; Clay; M15; Singles and doubles draws	(United States) Keshav Chopra (United States) Andres Martin; 7–6^{(7–5)}, 6–4	(Argentina) Ignacio Monzón (Argentina) Lorenzo Joaquín Rodriguez	(Argentina) Ignacio Monzón (Italy) Tommaso Compagnucci	(United States) Bruno Kuzuhara (United States) Cannon Kingsley (United States) Patrick Maloney (United States) Andres Martin
February 17	Burnie, Australia; Hard; M25; Singles and doubles draws	(Australia) Jason Kubler; 6–3, 6–2	(Australia) Omar Jasika	(South Korea) Chung Hyeon (Australia) Dane Sweeny	(New Zealand) Ajeet Rai (Japan) Shintaro Imai (United States) Christian Langmo (Japan) Takuya Kumasaka
February 17	Burnie, Australia; Hard; M25; Singles and doubles draws	(Australia) Matt Hulme (New Zealand) James Watt; 6–2, 6–4	(Chinese Taipei) Hsu Yu-hsiou (Chinese Taipei) Huang Tsung-hao	(South Korea) Chung Hyeon (Australia) Dane Sweeny	(New Zealand) Ajeet Rai (Japan) Shintaro Imai (United States) Christian Langmo (Japan) Takuya Kumasaka
February 17	Vila Real de Santo António, Portugal; Hard; M25; Singles and doubles draws	(Portugal) Gastão Elias; 6–2, 6–1	(United Kingdom) Ryan Peniston	(Portugal) Frederico Ferreira Silva (Colombia) Adrià Soriano Barrera	(Germany) Diego Dedura-Palomero (Uzbekistan) Sergey Fomin (Romania) Cezar Crețu (Croatia) Mili Poljičak
February 17	Vila Real de Santo António, Portugal; Hard; M25; Singles and doubles draws	(Canada) Justin Boulais (United States) William Woodall; 7–5, 5–7, [10–7]	(Finland) Patrick Kaukovalta (United States) Quinn Vandecasteele	(Portugal) Frederico Ferreira Silva (Colombia) Adrià Soriano Barrera	(Germany) Diego Dedura-Palomero (Uzbekistan) Sergey Fomin (Romania) Cezar Crețu (Croatia) Mili Poljičak
February 17	Trento, Italy; Hard (i); M25; Singles and doubles draws	(Denmark) Christian Sigsgaard; 6–2, 6–3	(Estonia) Daniil Glinka	(France) Dan Added (Germany) Marvin Möller	(Italy) Giovanni Fonio (Italy) Luca Castagnola (Austria) Dennis Novak (Czech Republic) David Poljak
February 17	Trento, Italy; Hard (i); M25; Singles and doubles draws	(France) Dan Added (Czech Republic) Jan Jermář; 6–4, 6–4	(Croatia) Admir Kalender (Croatia) Nino Serdarušić	(France) Dan Added (Germany) Marvin Möller	(Italy) Giovanni Fonio (Italy) Luca Castagnola (Austria) Dennis Novak (Czech Republic) David Poljak
February 17	Punta del Este, Uruguay; Clay; M25; Singles and doubles draws	(Ecuador) Álvaro Guillén Meza; 6–1, 6–2	(Argentina) Mariano Kestelboim	(Argentina) Andrea Collarini (Argentina) Renzo Olivo	(Argentina) Luciano Emanuel Ambrogi (Brazil) José Pereira (Argentina) Santiago Rodríguez Taverna (Argentina) Hernán Casanova
February 17	Punta del Este, Uruguay; Clay; M25; Singles and doubles draws	(Argentina) Hernán Casanova (Argentina) Santiago Rodríguez Taverna; 6–1, 1–6, [10–5]	(Argentina) Valentín Basel (Argentina) Franco Ribero	(Argentina) Andrea Collarini (Argentina) Renzo Olivo	(Argentina) Luciano Emanuel Ambrogi (Brazil) José Pereira (Argentina) Santiago Rodríguez Taverna (Argentina) Hernán Casanova
February 17	Pretoria, South Africa; Hard; M15; Singles and doubles draws	(Bulgaria) Alexander Donski; 7–6^{(7–5)}, 6–4	(Turkey) Cem İlkel	(Netherlands) Pepijn Bastiaansen (Hungary) Attila Boros	(Cyprus) Melios Efstathiou (Venezuela) Brandon Pérez (France) Hugo Pierre (Turkey) Tuncay Duran
February 17	Pretoria, South Africa; Hard; M15; Singles and doubles draws	(Spain) Izan Almazán Valiente (Bulgaria) Alexander Donski; 6–2, 5–7, [10–7]	(United States) Tristan Stringer (Australia) Stefan Vujic	(Netherlands) Pepijn Bastiaansen (Hungary) Attila Boros	(Cyprus) Melios Efstathiou (Venezuela) Brandon Pérez (France) Hugo Pierre (Turkey) Tuncay Duran
February 17	Villena, Spain; Hard; M15; Singles and doubles draws	(United States) Darwin Blanch; 1–6, 7–5, 7–5	(United Kingdom) Oliver Crawford	(Netherlands) Stijn Slump (Spain) Alejandro Manzanera Pertusa	(Spain) Sergio Callejón Hernando (Chile) Diego Fernández Flores (United States) Dali Blanch (Spain) Diego Augusto Barreto Sanchez
February 17	Villena, Spain; Hard; M15; Singles and doubles draws	(United States) Dali Blanch (France) Lilian Marmousez; 7–5, 6–2	(Spain) Alejandro García Carbajal (Spain) Mario Mansilla Díez	(Netherlands) Stijn Slump (Spain) Alejandro Manzanera Pertusa	(Spain) Sergio Callejón Hernando (Chile) Diego Fernández Flores (United States) Dali Blanch (Spain) Diego Augusto Barreto Sanchez
February 17	Lannion, France; Hard (i); M15; Singles and doubles draws	(United Kingdom) Oliver Bonding; 6–3, 7–6^{(11–9)}	(France) Axel Garcian	(United Kingdom) Emile Hudd (United Kingdom) Hamish Stewart	(Serbia) Boris Butulija (France) Pierre Antoine Faut (Poland) Olaf Pieczkowski (France) Mathias Bourgue
February 17	Lannion, France; Hard (i); M15; Singles and doubles draws	(France) Axel Garcian (France) Yanis Ghazouani Durand; 6–2, 6–4	(United Kingdom) Ben Jones (United Kingdom) Hamish Stewart	(United Kingdom) Emile Hudd (United Kingdom) Hamish Stewart	(Serbia) Boris Butulija (France) Pierre Antoine Faut (Poland) Olaf Pieczkowski (France) Mathias Bourgue
February 17	Antalya, Turkiye; Clay; M15; Singles and doubles draws	(Bosnia and Herzegovina) Nerman Fatić; 6–2, 6–3	(Bosnia and Herzegovina) Andrej Nedić	(Italy) Pietro Marino (Italy) Alexander Weis	(Bosnia and Herzegovina) Mirza Bašić; Bekkhan Atlangeriev (France) Arthur Nagel (Croatia) Nikola Bašić
February 17	Antalya, Turkiye; Clay; M15; Singles and doubles draws	(Bosnia and Herzegovina) Mirza Bašić (Bosnia and Herzegovina) Nerman Fatić; 2–6, 7–5, [10–7]	(Serbia) Marko Maksimović (Bosnia and Herzegovina) Andrej Nedić	(Italy) Pietro Marino (Italy) Alexander Weis	(Bosnia and Herzegovina) Mirza Bašić; Bekkhan Atlangeriev (France) Arthur Nagel (Croatia) Nikola Bašić
February 17	Monastir, Tunisia; Hard; M15; Singles and doubles draws	(Greece) Stefanos Sakellaridis; 5–7, 7–6^{(7–1)}, 6–0	(Italy) Fabrizio Andaloro	(Germany) Florian Broska (Spain) Alberto Barroso Campos	(Belgium) Emilien Demanet (Belgium) Jack Logé (Ukraine) Oleksii Krutykh (France) Nicolas Tepmahc
February 17	Monastir, Tunisia; Hard; M15; Singles and doubles draws	(Spain) Alberto Barroso Campos (Spain) Ignasi Forcano; 4–6, 6–1, [10–5]	(Czech Republic) Tadeas Paroulek (United States) Karl Poling	(Germany) Florian Broska (Spain) Alberto Barroso Campos	(Belgium) Emilien Demanet (Belgium) Jack Logé (Ukraine) Oleksii Krutykh (France) Nicolas Tepmahc
February 17	Sharm El Sheikh, Egypt; Hard; M15; Singles and doubles draws	(United States) Martin Damm; 6–3, 3–6, 6–2	(Italy) Alexandr Binda	Erik Arutiunian (Georgia (country)) Aleksandre Bakshi	(Italy) Michele Ribecai (Italy) Carlo Alberto Caniato (Italy) Filippo Moroni (Egypt) Fares Zakaria
February 17	Sharm El Sheikh, Egypt; Hard; M15; Singles and doubles draws	(Italy) Federico Bondioli (Italy) Carlo Alberto Caniato; 4–6, 7–6^{(7–1)}, [10–4]	Erik Arutiunian; Daniil Ostapenkov	Erik Arutiunian (Georgia (country)) Aleksandre Bakshi	(Italy) Michele Ribecai (Italy) Carlo Alberto Caniato (Italy) Filippo Moroni (Egypt) Fares Zakaria
February 17	Naples, United States; Clay; M15; Singles and doubles draws	(United States) Felix Corwin; 6–4, 6–7^{(7–9)}, 7–6^{(8–6)}	(Czech Republic) Daniel Pátý	(United States) Cannon Kingsley (United States) Victor Lilov	(Kazakhstan) Dmitry Popko (Canada) Taha Baadi (Argentina) Ignacio Monzón (Italy) Tommaso Compagnucci
February 17	Naples, United States; Clay; M15; Singles and doubles draws	(Brazil) João Vítor Gonçalves Ceolin (Czech Republic) Daniel Pátý; 2–6, 6–3, [11–9]	(United States) Jamie Vance (United States) Tennyson Whiting	(United States) Cannon Kingsley (United States) Victor Lilov	(Kazakhstan) Dmitry Popko (Canada) Taha Baadi (Argentina) Ignacio Monzón (Italy) Tommaso Compagnucci
February 24	Launceston, Australia; Hard; M25; Singles and doubles draws	(Australia) Jason Kubler; 6–2, 6–4	(Australia) Cruz Hewitt	(United States) Christian Langmo (South Korea) Shin San-hui	(United States) Joshua Sheehy (Australia) Pavle Marinkov (New Zealand) Ajeet Rai (Chinese Taipei) Hsu Yu-hsiou
February 24	Launceston, Australia; Hard; M25; Singles and doubles draws	(Chinese Taipei) Hsu Yu-hsiou (Chinese Taipei) Huang Tsung-hao; 7–5, 6–1	(Australia) Kody Pearson (United States) Joshua Sheehy	(United States) Christian Langmo (South Korea) Shin San-hui	(United States) Joshua Sheehy (Australia) Pavle Marinkov (New Zealand) Ajeet Rai (Chinese Taipei) Hsu Yu-hsiou
February 24	Faro, Portugal; Hard; M25; Singles and doubles draws	(Germany) Marko Topo; 6–1, 3–6, 6–1	(Portugal) Tiago Pereira	(United Kingdom) Liam Broady (Portugal) Frederico Ferreira Silva	(Spain) Tomás Currás Abasolo (China) Zhou Yi (Portugal) Tomas Luis (Romania) Gabi Adrian Boitan
February 24	Faro, Portugal; Hard; M25; Singles and doubles draws	(Finland) Patrick Kaukovalta (Finland) Eero Vasa; 7–5, 6–4	(United States) Andre Ilagan (Japan) Ryotaro Taguchi	(United Kingdom) Liam Broady (Portugal) Frederico Ferreira Silva	(Spain) Tomás Currás Abasolo (China) Zhou Yi (Portugal) Tomas Luis (Romania) Gabi Adrian Boitan
February 24	Yerba Buena, Argentina; Clay; M25; Singles and doubles draws	(Argentina) Lautaro Midón; 6–4, 7–5	(Brazil) Pedro Sakamoto	(Argentina) Hernán Casanova (Argentina) Mariano Kestelboim	(Argentina) Santiago Rodríguez Taverna (Argentina) Juan Estévez (Argentina) Luciano Emanuel Ambrogi (Argentina) Carlos María Zárate
February 24	Yerba Buena, Argentina; Clay; M25; Singles and doubles draws	(Argentina) Tomas Farjat (Peru) Conner Huertas del Pino; 6–1, 6–4	(Argentina) Juan Estévez (Argentina) Juan Bautista Otegui	(Argentina) Hernán Casanova (Argentina) Mariano Kestelboim	(Argentina) Santiago Rodríguez Taverna (Argentina) Juan Estévez (Argentina) Luciano Emanuel Ambrogi (Argentina) Carlos María Zárate
February 24	Maanshan, China; Hard (i); M15; Singles and doubles draws	(China) Te Rigele; 6–3, 6–2	(China) Zhang Tianhui	(Switzerland) Luca Castelnuovo (Germany) Nino Ehrenschneider	(Japan) Koki Matsuda (South Korea) Lee Duck-hee (South Korea) Shin Woo-bin (Thailand) Thanapet Chanta
February 24	Maanshan, China; Hard (i); M15; Singles and doubles draws	(South Korea) Jeong Yeong-seok (Japan) Yuta Kawahashi; 6–2, 6–1	Mikalai Haliak (Chinese Taipei) Lo Yi-jui	(Switzerland) Luca Castelnuovo (Germany) Nino Ehrenschneider	(Japan) Koki Matsuda (South Korea) Lee Duck-hee (South Korea) Shin Woo-bin (Thailand) Thanapet Chanta
February 24	Villena, Spain; Hard; M15; Singles and doubles draws	(Italy) Raúl Brancaccio; Walkover	(Spain) Iñaki Montes de la Torre	(United Kingdom) Oliver Crawford (Spain) John Echeverría	(Spain) Miguel Damas (Spain) Alex Martinez (Netherlands) Stijn Slump (France) Lilian Marmousez
February 24	Villena, Spain; Hard; M15; Singles and doubles draws	(Hungary) Adam Jilly (Finland) Oskari Paldanius; Walkover	(Spain) Alex Martinez (Spain) Iñaki Montes de la Torre	(United Kingdom) Oliver Crawford (Spain) John Echeverría	(Spain) Miguel Damas (Spain) Alex Martinez (Netherlands) Stijn Slump (France) Lilian Marmousez
February 24	Pretoria, South Africa; Hard; M15; Singles and doubles draws	(Turkey) Cem İlkel; 6–3, 6–4	(Netherlands) Pepijn Bastiaansen	(Hungary) Matyas Fuele (Spain) Izan Almazán Valiente	(Turkey) Mert Alkaya (Turkey) Tuncay Duran (India) Ishaque Eqbal (Cyprus) Melios Efstathiou
February 24	Pretoria, South Africa; Hard; M15; Singles and doubles draws	(Turkey) Tuncay Duran (Turkey) Alp Horoz; Walkover	(Spain) Izan Almazán Valiente (Bulgaria) Alexander Donski	(Hungary) Matyas Fuele (Spain) Izan Almazán Valiente	(Turkey) Mert Alkaya (Turkey) Tuncay Duran (India) Ishaque Eqbal (Cyprus) Melios Efstathiou
February 24	Antalya, Turkiye; Clay; M15; Singles and doubles draws	(Italy) Alexander Weis; 6–2, 7–5	(Bosnia and Herzegovina) Mirza Bašić	(Ukraine) Viacheslav Bielinskyi (Italy) Niccolò Catini	(Croatia) Luka Mikrut; Svyatoslav Gulin (Spain) Carlos López Montagud (Bosnia and Herzegovina) Nerman Fatić
February 24	Antalya, Turkiye; Clay; M15; Singles and doubles draws	Andrey Chepelev; Svyatoslav Gulin; 7–6^{(7–4)}, 6–1	(Turkey) Gökberk Sarıtaş (Turkey) Mert Naci Türker	(Ukraine) Viacheslav Bielinskyi (Italy) Niccolò Catini	(Croatia) Luka Mikrut; Svyatoslav Gulin (Spain) Carlos López Montagud (Bosnia and Herzegovina) Nerman Fatić
February 24	Sharm El Sheikh, Egypt; Hard; M15; Singles and doubles draws	(Italy) Federico Cinà; 7–6^{(7–3)}, 7–6^{(7–3)}	(United States) Martin Damm	(Latvia) Robert Strombachs (Georgia (country)) Saba Purtseladze	(Italy) Alexandr Binda (France) Moïse Kouamé (Georgia (country)) Aleksandre Bakshi (Sweden) Leo Borg
February 24	Sharm El Sheikh, Egypt; Hard; M15; Singles and doubles draws	(Egypt) Akram El Sallaly (Netherlands) Jarno Jans; 6–4, 6–2	(China) Wang Aoran (China) Wang Yukun	(Latvia) Robert Strombachs (Georgia (country)) Saba Purtseladze	(Italy) Alexandr Binda (France) Moïse Kouamé (Georgia (country)) Aleksandre Bakshi (Sweden) Leo Borg
February 24	Monastir, Tunisia; Hard; M15; Singles and doubles draws	(Czech Republic) Tadeas Paroulek; 2–6, 6–3, 6–4	(Germany) Tom Gentzsch	(Czech Republic) Petr Brunclík (Ukraine) Oleksii Krutykh	(Italy) Lorenzo Carboni (Belgium) Martin van der Meerschen (Lebanon) Fadi Bidan (Kazakhstan) Amir Omarkhanov
February 24	Monastir, Tunisia; Hard; M15; Singles and doubles draws	(Czech Republic) Tadeas Paroulek (Greece) Dimitris Sakellaridis; 4–6, 4–1 ret.	(Germany) Tom Gentzsch (France) Maxence Rivet	(Czech Republic) Petr Brunclík (Ukraine) Oleksii Krutykh	(Italy) Lorenzo Carboni (Belgium) Martin van der Meerschen (Lebanon) Fadi Bidan (Kazakhstan) Amir Omarkhanov
February 24	Huamantla, Mexico; Hard; M15; Singles and doubles draws	(United States) Ryan Fishback; 7–6^{(7–4)}, 6–3	(Canada) Alvin Nicholas Tudorica	(Spain) Iván Marrero Curbelo (United States) Tyler Stice	(United States) Elijah Strode (Colombia) Juan Sebastián Osorio (Italy) Pietro Orlando Fellin (Belgium) Maikel de Boes
February 24	Huamantla, Mexico; Hard; M15; Singles and doubles draws	(United States) Ryan Fishback (Canada) Alvin Nicholas Tudorica; 7–6^{(7–1)}, 5–7, [10–6]	(United States) Elijah Strode (Colombia) Juan Sebastián Osorio	(Spain) Iván Marrero Curbelo (United States) Tyler Stice	(United States) Elijah Strode (Colombia) Juan Sebastián Osorio (Italy) Pietro Orlando Fellin (Belgium) Maikel de Boes

=== March ===
Week of	Tournament	Winner	Runners-up	Semifinalists	Quarterfinalists
March 3	Trimbach, Switzerland; Carpet (i); M25; Singles and doubles draws	(Estonia) Daniil Glinka; 6–4, 6–2	(Switzerland) Dominic Stricker	(United Kingdom) Ben Jones (Germany) Tim Handel	(Italy) Lorenzo Rottoli (Italy) Alessandro Pecci; Evgeny Karlovskiy (Germany) Mats Rosenkranz
March 3	Trimbach, Switzerland; Carpet (i); M25; Singles and doubles draws	(United Kingdom) Ben Jones (Czech Republic) David Poljak; 7–5, 6–4	(Germany) Mats Rosenkranz (Germany) Niklas Schell	(United Kingdom) Ben Jones (Germany) Tim Handel	(Italy) Lorenzo Rottoli (Italy) Alessandro Pecci; Evgeny Karlovskiy (Germany) Mats Rosenkranz
March 3	Quinta do Lago, Portugal; Hard; M25; Singles and doubles draws	(United Kingdom) George Loffhagen; 6–3, 6–4	(Romania) Gabi Adrian Boitan	(Canada) Justin Boulais (Portugal) Tomas Luis	(United States) Quinn Vandecasteele (Belgium) Kimmer Coppejans (Portugal) Pedro Araújo (Spain) Tomás Currás Abasolo
March 3	Quinta do Lago, Portugal; Hard; M25; Singles and doubles draws	(Portugal) Diogo Marques (Portugal) Tiago Pereira; 6–4, 6–2	(Finland) Patrick Kaukovalta (Estonia) Johannes Seeman	(Canada) Justin Boulais (Portugal) Tomas Luis	(United States) Quinn Vandecasteele (Belgium) Kimmer Coppejans (Portugal) Pedro Araújo (Spain) Tomás Currás Abasolo
March 3	Poitiers, France; Hard (i); M15; Singles and doubles draws	(France) Tristan Lamasine; 6–3, 6–7^{(0–7)}, 6–1	(United Kingdom) Hamish Stewart	(France) Mathias Bourgue (France) Loann Massard	(Italy) Jacopo Bilardo (France) Cyril Vandermeersch (France) Kenny de Schepper (France) Adrien Gobat
March 3	Poitiers, France; Hard (i); M15; Singles and doubles draws	(United Kingdom) Hamish Stewart (Finland) Eero Vasa; 7–5, 7–6^{(7–3)}	(France) Axel Garcian (France) Tristan Lamasine	(France) Mathias Bourgue (France) Loann Massard	(Italy) Jacopo Bilardo (France) Cyril Vandermeersch (France) Kenny de Schepper (France) Adrien Gobat
March 3	Torelló, Spain; Hard; M15; Singles and doubles draws	(Spain) John Echeverría; 6–4, 1–6, 6–3	(Italy) Fabrizio Andaloro	(Canada) Steven Diez (Japan) Hayato Matsuoka	(United States) William Grant (Netherlands) Stijn Slump (Spain) Alberto Barroso Campos (Spain) Alex Martinez
March 3	Torelló, Spain; Hard; M15; Singles and doubles draws	(Spain) John Echeverría (Chile) Diego Fernández Flores; 6–4, 6–3	(Spain) Alberto Barroso Campos (Spain) Benjamín Winter López	(Canada) Steven Diez (Japan) Hayato Matsuoka	(United States) William Grant (Netherlands) Stijn Slump (Spain) Alberto Barroso Campos (Spain) Alex Martinez
March 3	Maanshan, China; Hard (i); M15; Singles and doubles draws	(China) Bai Yan; 6–3, 6–4	Egor Agafonov	Artur Kukasian (Germany) Nino Ehrenschneider	(Japan) Taisei Ichikawa (Japan) Yusuke Takahashi (China) Zhang Tianhui (Thailand) Wishaya Trongcharoenchaikul
March 3	Maanshan, China; Hard (i); M15; Singles and doubles draws	(Japan) Taisei Ichikawa (Japan) Ryuki Matsuda; 4–6, 7–5, [10–5]	(China) Sun Qian (China) Tang Sheng	Artur Kukasian (Germany) Nino Ehrenschneider	(Japan) Taisei Ichikawa (Japan) Yusuke Takahashi (China) Zhang Tianhui (Thailand) Wishaya Trongcharoenchaikul
March 3	Antalya, Turkiye; Clay; M15; Singles and doubles draws	(Croatia) Luka Mikrut; 6–3, 7–6^{(7–4)}	(Spain) Max Alcalá Gurri	(Turkey) Mert Naci Türker (Uzbekistan) Sergey Fomin	Svyatoslav Gulin (Spain) Carlos López Montagud (Italy) Alexander Weis (Argentina) Juan Pablo Paz
March 3	Antalya, Turkiye; Clay; M15; Singles and doubles draws	(Morocco) Younes Lalami Laaroussi (Ukraine) Nikita Mashtakov; 7–6^{(7–2)}, 7–5	(Uzbekistan) Sergey Fomin (Germany) John Sperle	(Turkey) Mert Naci Türker (Uzbekistan) Sergey Fomin	Svyatoslav Gulin (Spain) Carlos López Montagud (Italy) Alexander Weis (Argentina) Juan Pablo Paz
March 3	Sharm El Sheikh, Egypt; Hard; M15; Singles and doubles draws	(Latvia) Robert Strombachs; 6–3, 6–2	(France) Moïse Kouamé	(Estonia) Kristjan Tamm (Georgia (country)) Saba Purtseladze	(China) Wang Aoran (Senegal) Seydina Andre (Lithuania) Pijus Vaitiekunas (Sweden) Olle Wallin
March 3	Sharm El Sheikh, Egypt; Hard; M15; Singles and doubles draws	(Ukraine) Illya Beloborodko (Georgia (country)) Saba Purtseladze; 6–3, 5–7, [10–8]	(Italy) Leonardo Cattaneo (Ukraine) Vadym Ursu	(Estonia) Kristjan Tamm (Georgia (country)) Saba Purtseladze	(China) Wang Aoran (Senegal) Seydina Andre (Lithuania) Pijus Vaitiekunas (Sweden) Olle Wallin
March 3	Monastir, Tunisia; Hard; M15; Singles and doubles draws	(Italy) Lorenzo Carboni; 6–2, 1–6, 6–3	Nikolay Vylegzhanin	(Belgium) Buvaysar Gadamauri (Italy) Luca Potenza	(Czech Republic) Tadeas Paroulek (France) Thomas Deschamps (Morocco) Elliot Benchetrit (Tunisia) Aziz Ouakaa
March 3	Monastir, Tunisia; Hard; M15; Singles and doubles draws	(Italy) Riccardo Perin (Italy) Luca Potenza; 7–6^{(8–6)}, 6–1	(Brazil) Bruno Oliveira (Brazil) Christian Oliveira	(Belgium) Buvaysar Gadamauri (Italy) Luca Potenza	(Czech Republic) Tadeas Paroulek (France) Thomas Deschamps (Morocco) Elliot Benchetrit (Tunisia) Aziz Ouakaa
March 3	Sherbrooke, Canada; Hard (i); M15; Singles and doubles draws	(United States) Patrick Maloney; 6–4, 6–7^{(3–7)}, 6–4	(United States) Daniel Milavsky	(United States) Noah Schachter (United States) Alfredo Perez	(Canada) Nicaise Muamba (Netherlands) Daniel de Jonge (Canada) Taha Baadi (Netherlands) Brian Bozemoj
March 3	Sherbrooke, Canada; Hard (i); M15; Singles and doubles draws	(United States) Matt Kuhar (Canada) Dan Martin; 2–6, 6–2, [10–8]	(United States) Andrew Fenty (United States) Daniel Milavsky	(United States) Noah Schachter (United States) Alfredo Perez	(Canada) Nicaise Muamba (Netherlands) Daniel de Jonge (Canada) Taha Baadi (Netherlands) Brian Bozemoj
March 3	Huamantla, Mexico; Hard; M15; Singles and doubles draws	(United States) Garrett Johns; 4–6, 6–0, 7–6^{(7–5)}	(Mexico) Alex Hernández	(Canada) Alvin Nicholas Tudorica (United States) Gage Brymer	(Israel) Vladimir Basilevskiy (Colombia) Juan Sebastián Osorio (United States) Tristan McCormick (United Kingdom) Aidan McHugh
March 3	Huamantla, Mexico; Hard; M15; Singles and doubles draws	(United States) Garrett Johns (Spain) Iván Marrero Curbelo; 7–6^{(8–6)}, 6–4	(United States) Tristan McCormick (United States) Axel Nefve	(Canada) Alvin Nicholas Tudorica (United States) Gage Brymer	(Israel) Vladimir Basilevskiy (Colombia) Juan Sebastián Osorio (United States) Tristan McCormick (United Kingdom) Aidan McHugh
March 10	Mildura, Australia; Grass; M25; Singles and doubles draws	(Australia) Omar Jasika; 6–3, 6–4	(Australia) Pavle Marinkov	(Australia) Dane Sweeny (Australia) Blake Ellis	(Australia) Joshua Charlton (United States) Christian Langmo (Australia) Jake Delaney (New Zealand) Alexander Klintcharov
March 10	Mildura, Australia; Grass; M25; Singles and doubles draws	(Australia) Matt Hulme (New Zealand) James Watt; 6–7^{(7–9)}, 7–6^{(7–1)}, [13–11]	(Australia) Joshua Charlton (New Zealand) Ajeet Rai	(Australia) Dane Sweeny (Australia) Blake Ellis	(Australia) Joshua Charlton (United States) Christian Langmo (Australia) Jake Delaney (New Zealand) Alexander Klintcharov
March 10	Lu'an, China; Hard; M25; Singles and doubles draws	(United Kingdom) Oliver Crawford; 4–6, 6–3, 6–2	(South Korea) Chung Hyeon	(Australia) Akira Santillan (China) Cui Jie	(Japan) Rio Noguchi (China) Zhang Tianhui (Japan) Kaichi Uchida (China) Bai Yan
March 10	Lu'an, China; Hard; M25; Singles and doubles draws	(Japan) Taisei Ichikawa (Japan) Kaichi Uchida; 4–6, 6–3, [10–8]	(Chinese Taipei) Hsieh Cheng-peng (China) Tang Sheng	(Australia) Akira Santillan (China) Cui Jie	(Japan) Rio Noguchi (China) Zhang Tianhui (Japan) Kaichi Uchida (China) Bai Yan
March 10	Créteil, France; Hard (i); M25; Singles and doubles draws	Nikolay Vylegzhanin; 6–3, 3–6, 7–6^{(7–4)}	(France) Raphael Perot	Marat Sharipov (France) Amaury Raynel	(United Kingdom) Hamish Stewart (Germany) Marvin Möller (France) Tristan Lamasine (Belgium) Joris De Loore
March 10	Créteil, France; Hard (i); M25; Singles and doubles draws	(Czech Republic) David Poljak (United Kingdom) Hamish Stewart; 7–6^{(7–1)}, 6–3	(Netherlands) Mats Hermans (Germany) Tim Rühl	Marat Sharipov (France) Amaury Raynel	(United Kingdom) Hamish Stewart (Germany) Marvin Möller (France) Tristan Lamasine (Belgium) Joris De Loore
March 10	Les Franqueses del Vallès, Spain; Hard; M25; Singles and doubles draws	(Italy) Fabrizio Andaloro; 6–2, 6–7^{(1–7)}, 6–0	(Spain) Bernabé Zapata Miralles	(United States) William Grant (Japan) Hayato Matsuoka	(Spain) Alejo Sánchez Quílez (Germany) Nicola Kuhn (Bulgaria) Iliyan Radulov (South Korea) Gerard Campaña Lee
March 10	Les Franqueses del Vallès, Spain; Hard; M25; Singles and doubles draws	Doubles competition was cancelled due to ongoing poor weather		(United States) William Grant (Japan) Hayato Matsuoka	(Spain) Alejo Sánchez Quílez (Germany) Nicola Kuhn (Bulgaria) Iliyan Radulov (South Korea) Gerard Campaña Lee
March 10	Vale do Lobo, Portugal; Hard; M25; Singles and doubles draws	(United Kingdom) George Loffhagen; 6–0, 7–5	(Portugal) Tiago Pereira	(United Kingdom) James Story (Portugal) Gastão Elias	(Italy) Federico Bondioli (United States) Toby Kodat (China) Zhou Yi (Portugal) Francisco Rocha
March 10	Vale do Lobo, Portugal; Hard; M25; Singles and doubles draws	(Spain) Rafael Izquierdo Luque (Portugal) Francisco Rocha; 7–6^{(7–4)}, 6–3	(France) Robin Bertrand (Italy) Federico Bondioli	(United Kingdom) James Story (Portugal) Gastão Elias	(Italy) Federico Bondioli (United States) Toby Kodat (China) Zhou Yi (Portugal) Francisco Rocha
March 10	Asunción, Paraguay; Clay; M25; Singles and doubles draws	(Brazil) Daniel Dutra da Silva; 6–4, 6–1	(Argentina) Valerio Aboian	(Argentina) Thiago Cigarran (Argentina) Nicolás Kicker	(Argentina) Santiago Rodríguez Taverna (Argentina) Ezequiel Monferrer (United States) Felix Corwin (United States) Victor Lilov
March 10	Asunción, Paraguay; Clay; M25; Singles and doubles draws	(Brazil) Gustavo Ribeiro de Almeida (Brazil) Daniel Dutra da Silva; 6–1, 6–0	(Argentina) Juan Estévez (Argentina) Ezequiel Monferrer	(Argentina) Thiago Cigarran (Argentina) Nicolás Kicker	(Argentina) Santiago Rodríguez Taverna (Argentina) Ezequiel Monferrer (United States) Felix Corwin (United States) Victor Lilov
March 10	Nonthaburi, Thailand; Hard; M15; Singles and doubles draws	(Luxembourg) Alex Knaff; 6–1, 7–6^{(7–3)}	Petr Bar Biryukov	(Japan) Tomohiro Masabayashi (Italy) Giorgio Tabacco	(Thailand) Thanapet Chanta (Turkey) Koray Kırcı (Thailand) Pawit Sornlaksup (South Korea) Lee Jea-moon
March 10	Nonthaburi, Thailand; Hard; M15; Singles and doubles draws	(Indonesia) Muhammad Rifqi Fitriadi (Indonesia) Christopher Rungkat; 6–2, 6–4	(Thailand) Thanapet Chanta (Thailand) Yuttana Charoenphon	(Japan) Tomohiro Masabayashi (Italy) Giorgio Tabacco	(Thailand) Thanapet Chanta (Turkey) Koray Kırcı (Thailand) Pawit Sornlaksup (South Korea) Lee Jea-moon
March 10	Hinode, Japan; Hard; M15; Singles and doubles draws	(Japan) Hikaru Shiraishi; 6–2, 6–2	(Australia) Tai Sach	(Japan) Ryō Tabata (Japan) Takuya Kumasaka	(Australia) Moerani Bouzige (South Korea) Nam Ji-sung (Japan) Yuta Kawahashi (South Korea) Oh Chan-yeong
March 10	Hinode, Japan; Hard; M15; Singles and doubles draws	(South Korea) Nam Ji-sung (South Korea) Shin San-hui; 6–0, 6–4	(Japan) Koki Matsuda (Japan) Taiyo Yamanaka	(Japan) Ryō Tabata (Japan) Takuya Kumasaka	(Australia) Moerani Bouzige (South Korea) Nam Ji-sung (Japan) Yuta Kawahashi (South Korea) Oh Chan-yeong
March 10	Chandigarh, India; Hard; M15; Singles and doubles draws	(United Kingdom) Jay Clarke; 7–6^{(7–5)}, 4–6, 6–0	(South Korea) Shin Woo-bin	(Australia) Stefan Vujic (India) Ishaque Eqbal	(India) Madhwin Kamath (India) Nitin Kumar Sinha (India) Manish Sureshkumar (India) Karan Singh
March 10	Chandigarh, India; Hard; M15; Singles and doubles draws	(Italy) Filiberto Fumagalli (India) Aryan Lakshmanan; 2–6, 6–4, [11–9]	(India) S D Prajwal Dev (India) Nitin Kumar Sinha	(Australia) Stefan Vujic (India) Ishaque Eqbal	(India) Madhwin Kamath (India) Nitin Kumar Sinha (India) Manish Sureshkumar (India) Karan Singh
March 10	Poreč, Croatia; Clay; M15; Singles and doubles draws	(Bosnia and Herzegovina) Nerman Fatić; 6–2, 6–1	(Austria) Sandro Kopp	(Bosnia and Herzegovina) Andrej Nedić (Croatia) Mili Poljičak	(Italy) Samuele Pieri (Czech Republic) Dominik Kellovský (Slovenia) Jan Kupčič (Bosnia and Herzegovina) Mirza Bašić
March 10	Poreč, Croatia; Clay; M15; Singles and doubles draws	(Croatia) Emanuel Ivanišević (Croatia) Mili Poljičak; 6–3, 3–6, [10–5]	(Croatia) Karlo Kajin (Croatia) Deni Žmak	(Bosnia and Herzegovina) Andrej Nedić (Croatia) Mili Poljičak	(Italy) Samuele Pieri (Czech Republic) Dominik Kellovský (Slovenia) Jan Kupčič (Bosnia and Herzegovina) Mirza Bašić
March 10	Alaminos, Cyprus; Clay; M15; Singles and doubles draws	(Spain) Pablo Masjuan Ginel; 6–3, 6–4	(Switzerland) Damien Wenger	(Serbia) Branko Đurić (Italy) Gianluca Cadenasso	(Romania) Nicholas David Ionel (Italy) Lorenzo Beraldo (France) Arthur Nagel (Poland) Alan Ważny
March 10	Alaminos, Cyprus; Clay; M15; Singles and doubles draws	(Cyprus) Melios Efstathiou (Switzerland) Damien Wenger; 6–4, 6–3	(Italy) Matteo De Vincentis (Italy) Gian Marco Ortenzi	(Serbia) Branko Đurić (Italy) Gianluca Cadenasso	(Romania) Nicholas David Ionel (Italy) Lorenzo Beraldo (France) Arthur Nagel (Poland) Alan Ważny
March 10	Antalya, Turkiye; Clay; M15; Singles and doubles draws	Svyatoslav Gulin; 6–2, 0–6, 6–4	(Romania) Ștefan Adrian Andreescu	(Netherlands) Ryan Nijboer (Italy) Manuel Mazza	(Romania) Gabriel Ghețu (Germany) John Sperle (United States) Dali Blanch (Spain) Max Alcalá Gurri
March 10	Antalya, Turkiye; Clay; M15; Singles and doubles draws	(Germany) Luca Matteo Sobbe (Germany) John Sperle; 2–6, 7–6^{(8–6)}, [10–6]	(Spain) Diego Augusto Barreto Sanchez (Spain) Alejandro Manzanera Pertusa	(Netherlands) Ryan Nijboer (Italy) Manuel Mazza	(Romania) Gabriel Ghețu (Germany) John Sperle (United States) Dali Blanch (Spain) Max Alcalá Gurri
March 10	Sharm El Sheikh, Egypt; Hard; M15; Singles and doubles draws	(Georgia (country)) Saba Purtseladze; 6–4, 6–3	Erik Arutiunian	(Latvia) Robert Strombachs (Ukraine) Georgii Kravchenko	(Finland) Oskari Paldanius (Italy) Giovanni Oradini (Italy) Michele Ribecai (Egypt) Amr Elsayed
March 10	Sharm El Sheikh, Egypt; Hard; M15; Singles and doubles draws	Erik Arutiunian (Georgia (country)) Saba Purtseladze; 6–3, 7–6^{(7–5)}	(Ukraine) Aleksandr Braynin (Ukraine) Georgii Kravchenko	(Latvia) Robert Strombachs (Ukraine) Georgii Kravchenko	(Finland) Oskari Paldanius (Italy) Giovanni Oradini (Italy) Michele Ribecai (Egypt) Amr Elsayed
March 10	Monastir, Tunisia; Hard; M15; Singles and doubles draws	(Italy) Luca Castagnola; 1–6, 6–4, 6–1	(Czech Republic) Tadeas Paroulek	(Netherlands) Abel Forger (Germany) Niklas Schell	(Czech Republic) Maxim Mrva (Tunisia) Aziz Ouakaa (Italy) Pietro Marino (Italy) Lorenzo Rottoli
March 10	Monastir, Tunisia; Hard; M15; Singles and doubles draws	(Belgium) Buvaysar Gadamauri (Germany) Niklas Schell; 6–2, 6–4	(France) Fabien Salle (France) Louis Tessa	(Netherlands) Abel Forger (Germany) Niklas Schell	(Czech Republic) Maxim Mrva (Tunisia) Aziz Ouakaa (Italy) Pietro Marino (Italy) Lorenzo Rottoli
March 10	Huamantla, Mexico; Hard; M15; Singles and doubles draws	(Italy) Pietro Orlando Fellin; 6–3, 6–3	(Canada) Alvin Nicholas Tudorica	(United States) Axel Nefve (United States) Isaiah Strode	(Colombia) Samuel Heredia (Israel) Amit Vales (United States) Elijah Strode (United States) Kase Schinnerer
March 10	Huamantla, Mexico; Hard; M15; Singles and doubles draws	(Mexico) Daniel Moreno (Mexico) Alan Fernando Rubio Fierros; 7–6^{(7–5)}, 7–6^{(7–2)}	(Republic of Ireland) Charles Barry (Spain) Iván Marrero Curbelo	(United States) Axel Nefve (United States) Isaiah Strode	(Colombia) Samuel Heredia (Israel) Amit Vales (United States) Elijah Strode (United States) Kase Schinnerer
March 10	Montreal, Canada; Hard (i); M15; Singles and doubles draws	(United States) Alex Rybakov; 4–6, 6–3, 7–5	(Canada) Joshua Lapadat	(Costa Rica) Jesse Flores (United States) Ezekiel Clark	(United Kingdom) Charlie Robertson (Netherlands) Daniel de Jonge (Canada) Benjamin Thomas George (Canada) Nicolas Arseneault
March 10	Montreal, Canada; Hard (i); M15; Singles and doubles draws	(United States) Andrew Fenty (United States) Daniel Milavsky; 7–6^{(7–5)}, 4–6, [10–7]	(Canada) Nicaise Muamba (United States) Jake van Emburgh	(Costa Rica) Jesse Flores (United States) Ezekiel Clark	(United Kingdom) Charlie Robertson (Netherlands) Daniel de Jonge (Canada) Benjamin Thomas George (Canada) Nicolas Arseneault
March 17	Swan Hill, Australia; Grass; M25; Singles and doubles draws	(Australia) Blake Ellis; 2–6, 6–3, 7–6^{(7–4)}	(Australia) Dane Sweeny	(Australia) Jason Kubler (United States) Christian Langmo	(Australia) Omar Jasika (Australia) Thomas Braithwaite (New Zealand) Ajeet Rai (Australia) Jake Delaney
March 17	Swan Hill, Australia; Grass; M25; Singles and doubles draws	(Australia) Joshua Charlton (New Zealand) Ajeet Rai; 6–4, 6–4	(Australia) Jake Delaney (Australia) Jesse Delaney	(Australia) Jason Kubler (United States) Christian Langmo	(Australia) Omar Jasika (Australia) Thomas Braithwaite (New Zealand) Ajeet Rai (Australia) Jake Delaney
March 17	Shenzhen, China; Hard; M25; Singles and doubles draws	(United Kingdom) Oliver Crawford; 7–6^{(7–5)}, 1–6, 6–2	(China) Bai Yan	(Australia) Akira Santillan (China) Mo Yecong	(Japan) Shintaro Imai (Japan) Keisuke Saitoh; Mikalai Haliak (Japan) Renta Tokuda
March 17	Shenzhen, China; Hard; M25; Singles and doubles draws	(Japan) Taisei Ichikawa (Japan) Kaichi Uchida; 6–4, 6–7^{(5–7)}, [10–7]	(Switzerland) Luca Castelnuovo (Australia) Akira Santillan	(Australia) Akira Santillan (China) Mo Yecong	(Japan) Shintaro Imai (Japan) Keisuke Saitoh; Mikalai Haliak (Japan) Renta Tokuda
March 17	Toulouse–Balma, France; Hard (i); M25; Singles and doubles draws	(United Kingdom) Harry Wendelken; 6–7^{(6–8)}, 6–4, 7–5	(France) Maé Malige	Egor Gerasimov; Marat Sharipov	(France) Raphael Perot (France) Axel Garcian (France) Loann Massard (France) Cyril Vandermeersch
March 17	Toulouse–Balma, France; Hard (i); M25; Singles and doubles draws	(France) Dan Added (France) Arthur Reymond; Walkover	(Czech Republic) David Poljak; Marat Sharipov	Egor Gerasimov; Marat Sharipov	(France) Raphael Perot (France) Axel Garcian (France) Loann Massard (France) Cyril Vandermeersch
March 17	Badalona, Spain; Clay; M25; Singles and doubles draws	(Italy) Lorenzo Giustino; 6–2, 2–6, 7–6^{(7–4)}	(Spain) Pol Martín Tiffon	(Spain) Àlex Martí Pujolràs (Spain) Alejo Sánchez Quílez	(Austria) Lukas Neumayer (Argentina) Julio César Porras (Venezuela) Ignacio Parisca Romera (Spain) Oriol Roca Batalla
March 17	Badalona, Spain; Clay; M25; Singles and doubles draws	(Brazil) Oscar José Gutierrez (Spain) Mario Mansilla Díez; 6–4, 6–4	(Brazil) Bruno Oliveira (Brazil) Christian Oliveira	(Spain) Àlex Martí Pujolràs (Spain) Alejo Sánchez Quílez	(Austria) Lukas Neumayer (Argentina) Julio César Porras (Venezuela) Ignacio Parisca Romera (Spain) Oriol Roca Batalla
March 17	Loulé, Portugal; Hard; M25; Singles and doubles draws	(United Kingdom) Ryan Peniston; 3–6, 6–1, 6–3	(Luxembourg) Chris Rodesch	(Belgium) Michael Geerts (Portugal) Pedro Araujo	(Portugal) Francisco Rocha (United States) Toby Kodat (Tunisia) Moez Echargui (Italy) Federico Bondioli
March 17	Loulé, Portugal; Hard; M25; Singles and doubles draws	Doubles competition was cancelled due to ongoing poor weather		(Belgium) Michael Geerts (Portugal) Pedro Araujo	(Portugal) Francisco Rocha (United States) Toby Kodat (Tunisia) Moez Echargui (Italy) Federico Bondioli
March 17	Santo Domingo, Dominican Republic; Hard; M25; Singles and doubles draws	(Czech Republic) Petr Brunclik; 2–6, 7–6^{(10–8)}, 6–3	(Tunisia) Aziz Dougaz	(Canada) Nicolas Arseneault (United Kingdom) Aidan McHugh	(Estonia) Mark Lajal (United Kingdom) Blu Baker (Thailand) Maximus Jones (United States) Andrew Fenty
March 17	Santo Domingo, Dominican Republic; Hard; M25; Singles and doubles draws	(United Kingdom) Blu Baker (United States) Andrew Fenty; 6–3, 6–4	(Brazil) Mateo Barreiros Reyes (Costa Rica) Jesse Flores	(Canada) Nicolas Arseneault (United Kingdom) Aidan McHugh	(Estonia) Mark Lajal (United Kingdom) Blu Baker (Thailand) Maximus Jones (United States) Andrew Fenty
March 17	Bakersfield, United States; Hard; M25; Singles and doubles draws	(United Kingdom) Johannus Monday; 6–2, 6–4	(United States) Alex Rybakov	(Slovenia) Bor Artnak (United States) Isaiah Strode	(United States) Trevor Svajda (United States) Andres Martin (United States) Noah Schachter (United States) Jagger Leach
March 17	Bakersfield, United States; Hard; M25; Singles and doubles draws	(United States) Keshav Chopra (United States) Andres Martin; 1–6, 6–1, [10–6]	(United States) Ryan Dickerson (United States) Ty Gentry	(Slovenia) Bor Artnak (United States) Isaiah Strode	(United States) Trevor Svajda (United States) Andres Martin (United States) Noah Schachter (United States) Jagger Leach
March 17	Nishitokyo, Japan; Hard; M15; Singles and doubles draws	(South Korea) Chung Hyeon; 6–4, 6–0	(Japan) Takuya Kumasaka	(Japan) Hikaru Shiraishi (South Korea) Nam Ji-sung	(Australia) Moerani Bouzige (Chinese Taipei) Lee Kuan-yi (Japan) Ryō Tabata (Chinese Taipei) Huang Tsung-hao
March 17	Nishitokyo, Japan; Hard; M15; Singles and doubles draws	(South Korea) Nam Ji-sung (Japan) Kaito Uesugi; 6–3, 6–1	(Japan) Yusuke Kusuhara (Japan) Shunsuke Nakagawa	(Japan) Hikaru Shiraishi (South Korea) Nam Ji-sung	(Australia) Moerani Bouzige (Chinese Taipei) Lee Kuan-yi (Japan) Ryō Tabata (Chinese Taipei) Huang Tsung-hao
March 17	Nonthaburi, Thailand; Hard; M15; Singles and doubles draws	(France) Étienne Donnet; 6–4, 6–2	(Luxembourg) Alex Knaff	(Thailand) Thanapet Chanta (Thailand) Pawit Sornlaksup	Petr Bar Biryukov (Poland) Filip Peliwo (Australia) Chase Ferguson (Ukraine) Yurii Dzhavakian
March 17	Nonthaburi, Thailand; Hard; M15; Singles and doubles draws	(South Korea) Lee Duck-hee (Japan) Tomohiro Masabayashi; 6–3, 6–4	(France) Étienne Donnet (France) Valentin Lapalu	(Thailand) Thanapet Chanta (Thailand) Pawit Sornlaksup	Petr Bar Biryukov (Poland) Filip Peliwo (Australia) Chase Ferguson (Ukraine) Yurii Dzhavakian
March 17	Ahmedabad, India; Hard; M15; Singles and doubles draws	(United Kingdom) Jay Clarke; 6–3, 7–6^{(7–4)}	(Italy) Alexandr Binda	(India) Aryan Shah (India) S D Prajwal Dev	(India) Nitin Kumar Sinha (India) Siddharth Vishwakarma (South Korea) Shin Woo-bin (India) Sidharth Rawat
March 17	Ahmedabad, India; Hard; M15; Singles and doubles draws	(India) Maan Kesharwani (India) Rishi Reddy; 6–4, 6–2	(India) S D Prajwal Dev (India) Nitin Kumar Sinha	(India) Aryan Shah (India) S D Prajwal Dev	(India) Nitin Kumar Sinha (India) Siddharth Vishwakarma (South Korea) Shin Woo-bin (India) Sidharth Rawat
March 17	Rovinj, Croatia; Clay; M15; Singles and doubles draws	(Ukraine) Viacheslav Bielinskyi; 6–3, 7–6^{(7–3)}	(Serbia) Marko Maksimović	(Serbia) Stefan Popović (Bosnia and Herzegovina) Andrej Nedić	(Hungary) Gergely Madarász (Italy) Jacopo Vasamì (Spain) Sergi Pérez Contri (Italy) Filippo Romano
March 17	Rovinj, Croatia; Clay; M15; Singles and doubles draws	(Italy) Filippo Romano (Italy) Edoardo Zanada; 6–3, 6–1	(Czech Republic) Matyáš Černý (Czech Republic) Jonáš Kučera	(Serbia) Stefan Popović (Bosnia and Herzegovina) Andrej Nedić	(Hungary) Gergely Madarász (Italy) Jacopo Vasamì (Spain) Sergi Pérez Contri (Italy) Filippo Romano
March 17	Heraklion, Greece; Hard; M15; Singles and doubles draws	(Greece) Stefanos Sakellaridis; 6–3, 6–3	(France) Pierre Delage	Ilia Simakin (United States) Keegan Smith	(United States) Matt Kuhar (Turkey) Cem Ilkel (United States) Miles Jones (Australia) Matthew Dellavedova
March 17	Heraklion, Greece; Hard; M15; Singles and doubles draws	(Poland) Szymon Kielan (Serbia) Stefan Latinović; 6–4, 6–3	(Poland) Martyn Pawelski (Poland) Kacper Żuk	Ilia Simakin (United States) Keegan Smith	(United States) Matt Kuhar (Turkey) Cem Ilkel (United States) Miles Jones (Australia) Matthew Dellavedova
March 17	Alaminos, Cyprus; Clay; M15; Singles and doubles draws	(Serbia) Branko Đurić; 6–3, 6–2	(Switzerland) Damien Wenger	(Spain) Pablo Masjuan Ginel (France) Maxence Bertimon	(Romania) Nicholas David Ionel (Romania) Yannick Theodor Alexandrescou (Germany) Florian Broska (Italy) Stefano D'Agostino
March 17	Alaminos, Cyprus; Clay; M15; Singles and doubles draws	(Cyprus) Melios Efstathiou (Cyprus) Andreas Timini; 7–6^{(7–4)}, 7–6^{(7–3)}	(Cyprus) Eleftherios Neos; Semen Pankin	(Spain) Pablo Masjuan Ginel (France) Maxence Bertimon	(Romania) Nicholas David Ionel (Romania) Yannick Theodor Alexandrescou (Germany) Florian Broska (Italy) Stefano D'Agostino
March 17	Antalya, Turkiye; Clay; M15; Singles and doubles draws	Svyatoslav Gulin; 6–3, 6–1	Andrey Chepelev	(France) Thomas Faurel (Spain) Alejandro Manzanera Pertusa	(Germany) Marlon Vankan (Uzbekistan) Sergey Formin (Poland) Tomasz Berkieta (Spain) Diego Augusto Barreto Sanchez
March 17	Antalya, Turkiye; Clay; M15; Singles and doubles draws	(Spain) Diego Augusto Barreto Sanchez (Spain) Alejandro Manzanera Pertusa; 7–6^{(7–4)}, 6–0	(Turkey) Tuna Altuna (Turkey) S Mert Özdemir	(France) Thomas Faurel (Spain) Alejandro Manzanera Pertusa	(Germany) Marlon Vankan (Uzbekistan) Sergey Formin (Poland) Tomasz Berkieta (Spain) Diego Augusto Barreto Sanchez
March 17	Sharm El Sheikh, Egypt; Hard; M15; Singles and doubles draws	(Slovakia) Michal Krajčí; 6–3, 6–7^{(5–7)}, 6–4	(Finland) Oskari Paldanius	(Italy) Alberto Bronzetti (Ukraine) Vadym Ursu	(Czech Republic) Marek Gengel (United States) Michael Zhu (Belgium) Louis Herman (Ukraine) Georgii Kravchenko
March 17	Sharm El Sheikh, Egypt; Hard; M15; Singles and doubles draws	(Italy) Giovanni Oradini (Finland) Oskari Paldanius; 6–4, 7–6^{(7–4)}	(Egypt) Amr Elsayed (Austria) Nico Hipfl	(Italy) Alberto Bronzetti (Ukraine) Vadym Ursu	(Czech Republic) Marek Gengel (United States) Michael Zhu (Belgium) Louis Herman (Ukraine) Georgii Kravchenko
March 17	Monastir, Tunisia; Hard; M15; Singles and doubles draws	(France) Florent Bax; 6–0, 6–3	(Czech Republic) Maxim Mrva	(United States) William Grant (Italy) Lorenzo Rottoli	(Croatia) Vito Tonejc (Czech Republic) Matthew William Donald (Belgium) Martin van der Meerschen (Italy) Luca Potenza
March 17	Monastir, Tunisia; Hard; M15; Singles and doubles draws	(Netherlands) Jarno Jans (Tunisia) Aziz Ouakaa; 3–6, 7–6^{(8–6)}, [10–4]	(Italy) Pietro Marino (Italy) Luca Potenza	(United States) William Grant (Italy) Lorenzo Rottoli	(Croatia) Vito Tonejc (Czech Republic) Matthew William Donald (Belgium) Martin van der Meerschen (Italy) Luca Potenza
March 17	Villa María, Argentina; Clay; M15; Singles and doubles draws	(Argentina) Juan Manuel La Serna; 6–4, 6–1	(Brazil) Pedro Rodrigues	(Argentina) Juan Estévez (Uruguay) Joaquín Aguilar Cardozo	(Argentina) Tomás Martinez (Argentina) Juan Bautista Otegui (Argentina) Lautaro Agustin Falabella (Brazil) João Vítor Gonçalves Ceolin
March 17	Villa María, Argentina; Clay; M15; Singles and doubles draws	(Argentina) Julián Cundom (Argentina) Franco Emanuel Egea; 6–2, 3–6, [10–6]	(Uruguay) Joaquín Aguilar Cardozo (Argentina) Nicolas Hollender	(Argentina) Juan Estévez (Uruguay) Joaquín Aguilar Cardozo	(Argentina) Tomás Martinez (Argentina) Juan Bautista Otegui (Argentina) Lautaro Agustin Falabella (Brazil) João Vítor Gonçalves Ceolin
March 24	Ahmedabad, India; Hard; M25; Singles and doubles draws	(India) Aryan Shah; 6–1, 6–3	(United Kingdom) Jay Clarke	(India) Karan Singh (India) Kriish Tyagi	(India) Chirag Duhan (Japan) Ryotaro Taguchi (Italy) Alexandr Binda (India) Siddharth Vishwakarma
March 24	Ahmedabad, India; Hard; M25; Singles and doubles draws	(India) Adil Kalyanpur (Australia) Kody Pearson; 6–3, 4–6, [16–14]	(United States) Nick Chappell (Kazakhstan) Grigoriy Lomakin	(India) Karan Singh (India) Kriish Tyagi	(India) Chirag Duhan (Japan) Ryotaro Taguchi (Italy) Alexandr Binda (India) Siddharth Vishwakarma
March 24	Saint-Dizier, France; Hard (i); M25; Singles and doubles draws	(France) Dan Added; 6–1, 4–6, 7–5	(France) Loann Massard	(France) Mathias Bourgue (United Kingdom) George Loffhagen	(United Kingdom) Harry Wendelken (France) Antoine Vincent (Germany) Mats Rosenkranz (France) Adan Freire Da Silva
March 24	Saint-Dizier, France; Hard (i); M25; Singles and doubles draws	(France) Dan Added (Czech Republic) Jan Jermář; Walkover	(United Kingdom) Tom Hands (United Kingdom) Harry Wendelken	(France) Mathias Bourgue (United Kingdom) George Loffhagen	(United Kingdom) Harry Wendelken (France) Antoine Vincent (Germany) Mats Rosenkranz (France) Adan Freire Da Silva
March 24	Tarragona, Spain; Clay; M25; Singles and doubles draws	(Spain) Nikolás Sánchez Izquierdo; 6–1, 6–3	(Italy) Raúl Brancaccio	(Spain) Andrés Santamarta Roig (Austria) Sandro Kopp	(Germany) Rudolf Molleker (Spain) Iñaki Montes de la Torre (Spain) Alejandro Juan Mano (Spain) Carlos Sánchez Jover
March 24	Tarragona, Spain; Clay; M25; Singles and doubles draws	(Austria) Sandro Kopp (Germany) Rudolf Molleker; 7–5, 4–6, [10–8]	(Belgium) Michael Geerts (Germany) Daniel Masur	(Spain) Andrés Santamarta Roig (Austria) Sandro Kopp	(Germany) Rudolf Molleker (Spain) Iñaki Montes de la Torre (Spain) Alejandro Juan Mano (Spain) Carlos Sánchez Jover
March 24	Santo Domingo, Dominican Republic; Hard; M25; Singles and doubles draws	(Dominican Republic) Roberto Cid Subervi; 6–3, 6–3	(United States) Garrett Johns	(Belgium) Gilles-Arnaud Bailly (Brazil) Gilbert Klier Júnior	(Canada) Nicaise Muamba (Dominican Republic) Peter Bertran (United Kingdom) Aidan McHugh (Czech Republic) Petr Brunclik
March 24	Santo Domingo, Dominican Republic; Hard; M25; Singles and doubles draws	(Brazil) Mateo Barreiros Reyes (Costa Rica) Jesse Flores; 4–6, 6–3, [10–5]	(Canada) Mikael Arseneault (Canada) Nicolas Arseneault	(Belgium) Gilles-Arnaud Bailly (Brazil) Gilbert Klier Júnior	(Canada) Nicaise Muamba (Dominican Republic) Peter Bertran (United Kingdom) Aidan McHugh (Czech Republic) Petr Brunclik
March 24	Luján, Argentina; Clay; M25; Singles and doubles draws	(Argentina) Lautaro Midón; 6–3, 6–1	(Argentina) Mariano Kestelboim	(Uruguay) Franco Roncadelli (Argentina) Santiago Rodríguez Taverna	(Brazil) Gustavo Ribeiro de Almeida (Argentina) Juan Manuel La Serna (Argentina) Alejo Lorenzo Lingua Lavallén (Chile) Nicolás Bruna
March 24	Luján, Argentina; Clay; M25; Singles and doubles draws	(United States) Sekou Bangoura (Israel) Roy Stepanov; 7–6^{(7–4)}, 6–2	(Uruguay) Federico Aguilar Cardozo (Uruguay) Joaquín Aguilar Cardozo	(Uruguay) Franco Roncadelli (Argentina) Santiago Rodríguez Taverna	(Brazil) Gustavo Ribeiro de Almeida (Argentina) Juan Manuel La Serna (Argentina) Alejo Lorenzo Lingua Lavallén (Chile) Nicolás Bruna
March 24	Calabasas, United States; Hard; M25; Singles and doubles draws	(United States) Stefan Dostanic; 2–6, 6–4, 6–3	(United States) Andres Martin	(United States) Darwin Blanch (United Kingdom) Jack Pinnington Jones	(United States) Ronald Hohmann (United States) Govind Nanda (United Kingdom) Alastair Gray (United States) Strong Kirchheimer
March 24	Calabasas, United States; Hard; M25; Singles and doubles draws	(United States) Govind Nanda (Canada) Benjamin Sigouin; 6–2, 6–7^{(4–7)}, [10–1]	(United States) Jayson Blando (United States) Michael Blando	(United States) Darwin Blanch (United Kingdom) Jack Pinnington Jones	(United States) Ronald Hohmann (United States) Govind Nanda (United Kingdom) Alastair Gray (United States) Strong Kirchheimer
March 24	Nonthaburi, Thailand; Hard; M15; Singles and doubles draws	(France) Étienne Donnet; 6–2, 1–6, 6–4	(South Korea) Lee Jea-moon	(Luxembourg) Alex Knaff (Indonesia) Muhammad Rifqi Fitriadi	Aleksandr Lobanov (Australia) Hayden Jones (Japan) Shintaro Imai (Malaysia) Mitsuki Wei Kang Leong
March 24	Nonthaburi, Thailand; Hard; M15; Singles and doubles draws	(South Korea) Jeong Yeong-seok (South Korea) Park Ui-sung; 2–6, 6–2, [10–4]	(Thailand) Thanapet Chanta (Thailand) Yuttana Charoenphon	(Luxembourg) Alex Knaff (Indonesia) Muhammad Rifqi Fitriadi	Aleksandr Lobanov (Australia) Hayden Jones (Japan) Shintaro Imai (Malaysia) Mitsuki Wei Kang Leong
March 24	Tsukuba, Japan; Hard; M15; Singles and doubles draws	(South Korea) Chung Hyeon; 6–4, 3–6, 6–1	(Japan) Takuya Kumasaka	(Chinese Taipei) Hsu Yu-hsiou (Poland) Filip Peliwo	(Japan) Hikaru Shiraishi (Northern Mariana Islands) Colin Sinclair (Japan) Ryō Tabata (Japan) Taiyo Yamanaka
March 24	Tsukuba, Japan; Hard; M15; Singles and doubles draws	(Japan) Yusuke Kusuhara (Japan) Shunsuke Nakagawa; 6–4, 6–7^{(2–7)}, [10–5]	(Chinese Taipei) Hsu Yu-hsiou (Chinese Taipei) Huang Tsung-hao	(Chinese Taipei) Hsu Yu-hsiou (Poland) Filip Peliwo	(Japan) Hikaru Shiraishi (Northern Mariana Islands) Colin Sinclair (Japan) Ryō Tabata (Japan) Taiyo Yamanaka
March 24	Foggia, Italy; Clay; M15; Singles and doubles draws	(United Kingdom) Liam Broady; 6–1, 6–3	(Italy) Iannis Miletich	(Italy) Filippo Romano (Italy) Giuseppe La Vela	(France) Lilian Marmousez (France) Lucas Bouquet (Italy) Manuel Mazza (Italy) Facundo Juarez
March 24	Foggia, Italy; Clay; M15; Singles and doubles draws	(Italy) Filippo Romano (Italy) Jacopo Vasamì; 6–1, 6–4	(Italy) Alessio De Bernardis (Italy) Manuel Plunger	(Italy) Filippo Romano (Italy) Giuseppe La Vela	(France) Lilian Marmousez (France) Lucas Bouquet (Italy) Manuel Mazza (Italy) Facundo Juarez
March 24	Opatija, Croatia; Clay; M15; Singles and doubles draws	(Croatia) Luka Mikrut; 6–3, 7–6^{(7–4)}	(North Macedonia) Kalin Ivanovski	(Spain) Sergi Pérez Contri (Czech Republic) Michael Vrbenský	(Croatia) Josip Šimundža (Bosnia and Herzegovina) Andrej Nedić (Serbia) Ognjen Milić (Czech Republic) Zdeněk Kolář
March 24	Opatija, Croatia; Clay; M15; Singles and doubles draws	(Hungary) Matyas Fuele (Hungary) Gergely Madarász; 7–5, 7–6^{(7–5)}	(Croatia) Karlo Kajin (Croatia) Deni Žmak	(Spain) Sergi Pérez Contri (Czech Republic) Michael Vrbenský	(Croatia) Josip Šimundža (Bosnia and Herzegovina) Andrej Nedić (Serbia) Ognjen Milić (Czech Republic) Zdeněk Kolář
March 24	Heraklion, Greece; Hard; M15; Singles and doubles draws	(United Kingdom) Stuart Parker; 6–2, 6–2	(Greece) Stefanos Sakellaridis	(Australia) Blake Mott (Greece) Petros Tsitsipas	(Israel) Amit Vales (Turkey) Mert Alkaya (United Kingdom) Marcus Walters (Switzerland) Gian Gruenig
March 24	Heraklion, Greece; Hard; M15; Singles and doubles draws	(United States) Billy Suarez (United States) Richard Zusman; 6–4, 6–2	(United States) Alex Jones (United States) Miles Jones	(Australia) Blake Mott (Greece) Petros Tsitsipas	(Israel) Amit Vales (Turkey) Mert Alkaya (United Kingdom) Marcus Walters (Switzerland) Gian Gruenig
March 24	Alaminos, Cyprus; Clay; M15; Singles and doubles draws	(Romania) Nicholas David Ionel; 7–6^{(7–3)}, 6–3	(Romania) Gabi Adrian Boitan	(Germany) Florian Broska (Germany) Michel Hopp	(Denmark) Benjamin Hannestad (Italy) Stefano D'Agostino (France) Arthur Nagel (Japan) Naoya Honda
March 24	Alaminos, Cyprus; Clay; M15; Singles and doubles draws	(Cyprus) Eleftherios Neos; Semen Pankin; 6–4, 3–6, [10–6]	(Italy) Gregorio Biondolillo (Italy) Stefano D'Agostino	(Germany) Florian Broska (Germany) Michel Hopp	(Denmark) Benjamin Hannestad (Italy) Stefano D'Agostino (France) Arthur Nagel (Japan) Naoya Honda
March 24	Antalya, Turkey; Clay; M15; Singles and doubles draws	(Uzbekistan) Sergey Fomin; 6–7^{(8–10)}, 6–4, 6–1	(Romania) Gabriel Ghețu	(Netherlands) Stijn Slump; Svyatoslav Gulin	(Belgium) Emilien Demanet (France) Thomas Faurel (Czech Republic) Martin Krumich (Italy) Gabriele Piraino
March 24	Antalya, Turkey; Clay; M15; Singles and doubles draws	(Uzbekistan) Sergey Fomin; Daniil Golubev; 4–6, 7–6^{(7–5)}, [10–6]	(Belgium) Emilien Demanet (Belgium) Jack Logé	(Netherlands) Stijn Slump; Svyatoslav Gulin	(Belgium) Emilien Demanet (France) Thomas Faurel (Czech Republic) Martin Krumich (Italy) Gabriele Piraino
March 24	Sharm El Sheikh, Egypt; Hard; M15; Singles and doubles draws	(Georgia (country)) Saba Purtseladze; 6–7^{(3–7)}, 6–3, 7–5	(Italy) Filippo Moroni	(Czech Republic) Marek Gengel (Ukraine) Vadym Ursu	Kirill Kivattsev (Egypt) Fares Zakaria (Georgia (country)) Aleksandre Bakshi; Erik Arutiunian
March 24	Sharm El Sheikh, Egypt; Hard; M15; Singles and doubles draws	Erik Arutiunian (Georgia (country)) Saba Purtseladze; 7–6^{(7–5)}, 4–6, [10–7]	Kirill Kivattsev (Italy) Filippo Moroni	(Czech Republic) Marek Gengel (Ukraine) Vadym Ursu	Kirill Kivattsev (Egypt) Fares Zakaria (Georgia (country)) Aleksandre Bakshi; Erik Arutiunian
March 24	Monastir, Tunisia; Hard; M15; Singles and doubles draws	(Slovakia) Lukáš Pokorný; 5–7, 6–1, 6–1	(Italy) Luca Potenza	(France) Florent Bax (Greece) Dimitris Sakellaridis	(Tunisia) Aziz Ouakaa (Croatia) Vito Tonejc (Egypt) Yusuf Khamis (Italy) Massimo Giunta
March 24	Monastir, Tunisia; Hard; M15; Singles and doubles draws	(France) Florent Bax (Slovakia) Lukáš Pokorný; 6–4, 6–4	(Czech Republic) Matthew William Donald (Greece) Dimitris Sakellaridis	(France) Florent Bax (Greece) Dimitris Sakellaridis	(Tunisia) Aziz Ouakaa (Croatia) Vito Tonejc (Egypt) Yusuf Khamis (Italy) Massimo Giunta
March 31	Bengaluru, India; Hard; M25; Singles and doubles draws	(United Kingdom) Oliver Crawford; 5–2 ret.	(United Kingdom) Jay Clarke	(India) Chirag Duhan (Japan) Ryuki Matsuda	(India) Karan Singh (India) Ishaque Eqbal; Maxim Zhukov (India) Aryan Shah
March 31	Bengaluru, India; Hard; M25; Singles and doubles draws	(United States) Nick Chappell (Kazakhstan) Grigoriy Lomakin; 6–2, 7–6^{(7–5)}	(India) S D Prajwal Dev (India) Nitin Kumar Sinha	(India) Chirag Duhan (Japan) Ryuki Matsuda	(India) Karan Singh (India) Ishaque Eqbal; Maxim Zhukov (India) Aryan Shah
March 31	Santa Margherita di Pula, Italy; Clay; M25; Singles and doubles draws	(Netherlands) Max Houkes; 6–3, 7–5	(Switzerland) Dominic Stricker	(Netherlands) Guy den Ouden (Italy) Gianmarco Ferrari	(Italy) Federico Bondioli (Switzerland) Nicolás Parizzia (Italy) Lorenzo Carboni (France) Laurent Lokoli
March 31	Santa Margherita di Pula, Italy; Clay; M25; Singles and doubles draws	(Italy) Gianmarco Ferrari (Italy) Noah Perfetti; 6–3, 6–4	(Italy) Alessio De Bernardis (Italy) Manuel Plunger	(Netherlands) Guy den Ouden (Italy) Gianmarco Ferrari	(Italy) Federico Bondioli (Switzerland) Nicolás Parizzia (Italy) Lorenzo Carboni (France) Laurent Lokoli
March 31	Reus, Spain; Clay; M25; Singles and doubles draws	(France) Clément Tabur; 6–4, 6–4	(Spain) Nikolás Sánchez Izquierdo	Ivan Gakhov (Portugal) Gastão Elias	(Spain) Alejo Sánchez Quílez (Spain) Andrés Santamarta Roig (Spain) Àlex Martínez (United Kingdom) Felix Gill
March 31	Reus, Spain; Clay; M25; Singles and doubles draws	(Sweden) Erik Grevelius (Sweden) Adam Heinonen; 6–4, 6–3	(Spain) Àlex Martínez (Spain) Jordi Más de Ugarte	Ivan Gakhov (Portugal) Gastão Elias	(Spain) Alejo Sánchez Quílez (Spain) Andrés Santamarta Roig (Spain) Àlex Martínez (United Kingdom) Felix Gill
March 31	Antalya, Turkey; Clay; M25; Singles and doubles draws	(Ukraine) Oleksii Krutykh; 7–6^{(7–4)}, 3–6, 7–5	(Uzbekistan) Sergey Fomin	(Czech Republic) Martin Krumich (Poland) Daniel Michalski	Alexey Vatutin (France) Moïse Kouamé (Czech Republic) Tadeáš Paroulek (Netherlands) Stijn Slump
March 31	Antalya, Turkey; Clay; M25; Singles and doubles draws	(Turkey) Gökberk Sarıtaş (Turkey) Mert Naci Türker; 7–6^{(7–4)}, 2–6, [10–8]	(Uzbekistan) Sergey Fomin; Pavel Verbin	(Czech Republic) Martin Krumich (Poland) Daniel Michalski	Alexey Vatutin (France) Moïse Kouamé (Czech Republic) Tadeáš Paroulek (Netherlands) Stijn Slump
March 31	Chacabuco, Argentina; Clay; M25; Singles and doubles draws	(Argentina) Santiago Rodríguez Taverna; 4–6, 6–4, 6–2	(Argentina) Juan Manuel La Serna	(Argentina) Valerio Aboian (Argentina) Alejo Lorenzo Lingua Lavallén	(Uruguay) Joaquín Aguilar Cardozo (Uruguay) Franco Roncadelli (Argentina) Juan Estévez (Argentina) Santiago de la Fuente
March 31	Chacabuco, Argentina; Clay; M25; Singles and doubles draws	(Argentina) Mateo del Pino (Argentina) Juan Manuel La Serna; 6–0, 6–2	(Argentina) Valentín Basel (Argentina) Franco Ribero	(Argentina) Valerio Aboian (Argentina) Alejo Lorenzo Lingua Lavallén	(Uruguay) Joaquín Aguilar Cardozo (Uruguay) Franco Roncadelli (Argentina) Juan Estévez (Argentina) Santiago de la Fuente
March 31	Kashiwa, Japan; Hard; M15; Singles and doubles draws	(Japan) Yusuke Takahashi; 6–2, 6–0	(Japan) Keisuke Saitoh	(Japan) Hikaru Shiraishi (Japan) Yua Taka	(Japan) Ryotero Matsumura (Japan) Taiyo Yamanaka (Japan) Sora Fukuda (Japan) Shunsuke Nakagawa
March 31	Kashiwa, Japan; Hard; M15; Singles and doubles draws	(Japan) Kazuma Kawachi (Japan) Koki Matsuda; 7–5, 7–5	(Japan) Issei Okamura (Japan) Riku Takahata	(Japan) Hikaru Shiraishi (Japan) Yua Taka	(Japan) Ryotero Matsumura (Japan) Taiyo Yamanaka (Japan) Sora Fukuda (Japan) Shunsuke Nakagawa
March 31	Lons-le-Saunier, France; Hard (i); M15; Singles and doubles draws	(France) Dan Added; 5–7, 7–6^{(8–6)}, 6–3	(France) Lucas Poullain	(Sweden) Olle Wallin (France) Leo Raquillet	(France) Axel Garcian (France) Simon Reveniau (France) Maxence Beaugé (United Kingdom) Ben Jones
March 31	Lons-le-Saunier, France; Hard (i); M15; Singles and doubles draws	(France) Marko Maric (Serbia) Tadija Radovanović; 4–6, 7–6^{(7–3)}, [10–6]	(France) Antoine Berger (United Kingdom) Stefan Cooper	(Sweden) Olle Wallin (France) Leo Raquillet	(France) Axel Garcian (France) Simon Reveniau (France) Maxence Beaugé (United Kingdom) Ben Jones
March 31	Heraklion, Greece; Hard; M15; Singles and doubles draws	(Greece) Stefanos Sakellaridis; 2–6, 6–1, 6–4	(United Kingdom) Stuart Parker	(Czech Republic) Dominik Kellovský (Poland) Olaf Pieczkowski	(Switzerland) Johan Nikles (Australia) Blake Mott (Italy) Leonardo Rossi (Romania) Robert Guna
March 31	Heraklion, Greece; Hard; M15; Singles and doubles draws	(Turkey) Tuncay Duran (Turkey) Alp Horoz; 6–1, 6–3	(South Africa) Vasilios Caripi (Germany) Jonas Pelle Hartenstein	(Czech Republic) Dominik Kellovský (Poland) Olaf Pieczkowski	(Switzerland) Johan Nikles (Australia) Blake Mott (Italy) Leonardo Rossi (Romania) Robert Guna
March 31	Sharm El Sheikh, Egypt; Hard; M15; Singles and doubles draws	(Ukraine) Vadym Ursu; 6–1, 3–6, 7–5	(United Kingdom) Hamish Stewart	Kirill Kivattsev (South Africa) Kris van Wyk	(Germany) Oscar Moraing (Georgia (country)) Saba Purtseladze (Ukraine) Yurii Dzhavakian; Evgeny Philippov
March 31	Sharm El Sheikh, Egypt; Hard; M15; Singles and doubles draws	(Germany) Niklas Schell (United Kingdom) Hamish Stewart; 6–3, 7–6^{(7–3)}	(Ukraine) Yurii Dzhavakian (Egypt) Fares Zakaria	Kirill Kivattsev (South Africa) Kris van Wyk	(Germany) Oscar Moraing (Georgia (country)) Saba Purtseladze (Ukraine) Yurii Dzhavakian; Evgeny Philippov
March 31	Monastir, Tunisia; Hard; M15; Singles and doubles draws	(Latvia) Robert Strombachs; 6–1, 4–6, 6–1	(Tunisia) Moez Echargui	(Tunisia) Aziz Ouakaa (Slovakia) Lukáš Pokorný	(France) Hugo Pierre (France) Charles Bertimon (Algeria) Samir Hamza Reguig (Portugal) Francisco Rocha
March 31	Monastir, Tunisia; Hard; M15; Singles and doubles draws	(Tunisia) Aziz Ouakaa (Slovakia) Lukáš Pokorný; 5–7, 6–3, [10–5]	(Portugal) João Graça (Portugal) Diogo Marques	(Tunisia) Aziz Ouakaa (Slovakia) Lukáš Pokorný	(France) Hugo Pierre (France) Charles Bertimon (Algeria) Samir Hamza Reguig (Portugal) Francisco Rocha
