= 2024 Belgrade Open – Doubles =

Doubles
- 2024 Belgrade Open

Final
- Champions: (United Kingdom) Jamie Murray (Australia) John Peers
- Runners-up: (Croatia) Ivan Dodig (Tunisia) Skander Mansouri
- Score: 3–6, 7–6^{(7–5)}, [11–9]

Events
Singles	Doubles
- Belgrade Open

Jamie Murray and John Peers defeated Ivan Dodig and Skander Mansouri in the final, 3–6, 7–6^{(7–5)}, [11–9] to win the doubles tennis title at the 2024 Belgrade Open. They saved a championship point in the third-set tiebreak.

Jonathan Erlich and Andrei Vasilevski were the defending champions from when the event was last held in 2021, but both players retired from professional tennis in 2022.

== Seeds ==
1. (United Kingdom) Jamie Murray / (Australia) John Peers (champions)
2. (France) Sadio Doumbia / (France) Fabien Reboul (first round)
3. (Uruguay) Ariel Behar / (United States) Robert Galloway (first round)
4. (Croatia) Ivan Dodig / (Tunisia) Skander Mansouri (final)

== Draw ==
Key

- Q = Qualifier
- WC = Wild card
- LL = Lucky loser
- Alt = Alternate
- ITF = ITF entry
- PR = Protected ranking
- SR = Special ranking
- SE = Special exempt
- JE = Junior exempt
- JR = Junior Accelerator Programme entrant
- CO = College Accelerator Programme entrant
- NG = Next Gen Accelerator Program entrant
- w/o = Walkover
- r = Retired
- d = Defaulted

=== Draw ===
First round
1	(United Kingdom) J Murray (Australia) J Peers	7^{7}	6
(Australia) J Duckworth (Australia) C O'Connell	6^{4}	1
(Czech Republic) P Nouza (Czech Republic) P Rikl	3	3
(Sweden) A Göransson (Netherlands) S Verbeek	6	6
3	(Uruguay) A Behar (United States) R Galloway	4	6^{7}
(Czech Republic) A Pavlásek (Australia) J-P Smith	6	7^{9}
(Serbia) I Sabanov (Serbia) M Sabanov	6^{5}	5
(Colombia) N Barrientos (Netherlands) D Pel	7^{7}	7
(Kazakhstan) A Nedovyesov (Mexico) MÁ Reyes-Varela	6	3	[6]
(France) J Eysseric (France) A Müller	2	6	[10]
(Romania) VV Cornea (Italy) L Darderi	3	6^{3}
4	(Croatia) I Dodig (Tunisia) S Mansouri	6	7^{7}
WC	(Serbia) B Djuric (Serbia) M Maksimović	0	4
(Ecuador) G Escobar (Ecuador) D Hidalgo	6	6
Alt	(Argentina) TM Etcheverry (Argentina) TA Tirante	5	6	[10]
2	(France) S Doumbia (France) F Reboul	7	4	[5]

Quarterfinals
1	(United Kingdom) J Murray (Australia) J Peers	6	6
(Sweden) A Göransson (Netherlands) S Verbeek	2	1
(Czech Republic) A Pavlásek (Australia) J-P Smith	3	6^{5}
(Colombia) N Barrientos (Netherlands) D Pel	6	7^{7}
(France) J Eysseric (France) A Müller	3	5
4	(Croatia) I Dodig (Tunisia) S Mansouri	6	7
(Ecuador) G Escobar (Ecuador) D Hidalgo	6	7^{7}
Alt	(Argentina) TM Etcheverry (Argentina) TA Tirante	4	6^{5}

Semifinals
1	(United Kingdom) J Murray (Australia) J Peers	6	6
(Colombia) N Barrientos (Netherlands) D Pel	2	4
4	(Croatia) I Dodig (Tunisia) S Mansouri	6	6
(Ecuador) G Escobar (Ecuador) D Hidalgo	3	3

Final
1	(United Kingdom) J Murray (Australia) J Peers	3	7^{7}	[11]
4	(Croatia) I Dodig (Tunisia) S Mansouri	6	6^{5}	[9]
