= 2024 Belgrade Open – Singles =

Singles
- 2024 Belgrade Open

Final
- Champion: (Canada) Denis Shapovalov
- Runner-up: (Serbia) Hamad Medjedovic
- Score: 6–4, 6–4

Details
- Draw: 28 (4Q, 3WC)
- Seeds: 8

Events
Singles	Doubles
- Belgrade Open

Denis Shapovalov defeated Hamad Medjedovic in the final, 6–4, 6–4 to win the singles tennis title at the 2024 Belgrade Open. It was his second ATP Tour title, and his first since 2019.

Novak Djokovic was the defending champion from when the tournament was last held in 2021, but did not participate this year.

== Seeds ==
The top four seeds received a bye into the second round.

1. (Australia) Alex de Minaur (withdrew)
2. (United States) Tommy Paul (withdrew)
3. (Argentina) Francisco Cerúndolo (quarterfinals)
4. (Czech Republic) Jiří Lehečka (semifinals)
5. (Portugal) Nuno Borges (second round)
6. (United States) Brandon Nakashima (first round)
7. (Argentina) Tomás Martín Etcheverry (second round)
8. (Italy) Luciano Darderi (first round)
9. (Argentina) Mariano Navone (first round)

== Draw ==
Key

- Q = Qualifier
- WC = Wild card
- LL = Lucky loser
- Alt = Alternate
- ITF = ITF entry
- PR = Protected ranking
- SR = Special ranking
- SE = Special exempt
- JE = Junior exempt
- JR = Junior Accelerator Programme entrant
- CO = College Accelerator Programme entrant
- NG = Next Gen Accelerator Program entrant
- w/o = Walkover
- r = Retired
- d = Defaulted

=== Finals ===
Semifinals
WC	(Serbia) Laslo Djere	2	6	6^{2}
WC	(Serbia) Hamad Medjedovic	6	3	7^{7}
4	(Czech Republic) Jiří Lehečka	2	1
Q	(Canada) Denis Shapovalov	6	6

Final
WC	(Serbia) Hamad Medjedovic	4	4
Q	(Canada) Denis Shapovalov	6	6

=== Top half ===
First round
WC	(Serbia) L Djere	6	6
WC	(Switzerland) S Wawrinka	4	4
(China) J Shang	6	6^{5}	5
(Hungary) F Marozsán	2	7^{7}	7
(Serbia) D Lajović	6	7^{7}
9	(Argentina) M Navone	0	6^{3}
R Safiullin	6	6
(Italy) F Fognini	3	3
Q	(Serbia) B Djuric	2	2
(United States) A Kovacevic	6	6
WC	(Serbia) H Medjedovic	3	7	6
6	(United States) B Nakashima	6	5	3

Second round
LL	(Croatia) D Ajduković	1	6^{8}
WC	(Serbia) L Djere	6	7^{10}
(Hungary) F Marozsán	6	7
(Serbia) D Lajović	3	5
3	(Argentina) F Cerúndolo	6	6
R Safiullin	4	4
(United States) A Kovacevic	6^{5}	4
WC	(Serbia) H Medjedovic	7^{7}	6

Quarterfinals
WC	(Serbia) L Djere	6	6
(Hungary) F Marozsán	4	2
3	(Argentina) F Cerúndolo	4	2
WC	(Serbia) H Medjedovic	6	6

Semifinals
WC	(Serbia) L Djere	2	6	6^{2}
WC	(Serbia) H Medjedovic	6	3	7^{7}

=== Bottom half ===
First round
7	(Argentina) TM Etcheverry	6	6
P Kotov	3	4
(Australia) J Duckworth	4	2
Q	(Slovakia) L Klein	6	6
PR	(Croatia) M Čilić	7^{7}	6
(France) A Müller	6^{2}	3
8	(Italy) L Darderi	6^{1}	3
(Germany) D Altmaier	7^{7}	6
(Serbia) M Kecmanović	1	1
(Australia) C O'Connell	6	6
Q	(Hungary) M Fucsovics	7^{8}	5	1
Q	(Canada) D Shapovalov	6^{6}	7	6

Second round
7	(Argentina) TM Etcheverry	4	6^{6}
Q	(Slovakia) L Klein	6	7^{8}
PR	(Croatia) M Čilić	4	6^{4}
4	(Czech Republic) J Lehečka	6	7^{7}
(Germany) D Altmaier	3	1
(Australia) C O'Connell	6	6
Q	(Canada) D Shapovalov	6	6
5	(Portugal) N Borges	2	4

Quarterfinals
Q	(Slovakia) L Klein	6	6^{3}	3
4	(Czech Republic) J Lehečka	3	7^{7}	6
(Australia) C O'Connell	2	2
Q	(Canada) D Shapovalov	6	6

Semifinals
4	(Czech Republic) J Lehečka	2	1
Q	(Canada) D Shapovalov	6	6

== Qualifying ==
=== Seeds ===
1. (Canada) Denis Shapovalov (qualified)
2. (Germany) Daniel Altmaier (moved to main draw)
3. (Hungary) Márton Fucsovics (qualified)
4. (Germany) Yannick Hanfmann (first round)
5. (Bosnia and Herzegovina) Damir Džumhur (first round)
6. (Croatia) Duje Ajduković (qualifying competition, lucky loser)
7. (Argentina) Thiago Agustín Tirante (qualifying competition)
8. (Slovakia) Jozef Kovalík (qualifying competition)

=== Qualifiers ===
1. (Canada) Denis Shapovalov
2. (Serbia) Branko Djuric
3. (Hungary) Márton Fucsovics
4. (Slovakia) Lukáš Klein

=== Lucky loser ===
1. (Croatia) Duje Ajduković

=== Qualifying draw ===
==== First qualifier ====
First round
1	(Canada) Denis Shapovalov	7^{7}	6
(France) Constant Lestienne	6^{4}	4
(France) Hugo Grenier	6	3	6
5	(Bosnia and Herzegovina) Damir Džumhur	3	6	3

Qualifying competition
1	(Canada) Denis Shapovalov	6	6
(France) Hugo Grenier	3	4

==== Second qualifier ====
First round
Alt	(France) Luka Pavlovic	7^{8}	3	4
WC	(Serbia) Branko Djuric	6^{6}	6	6
WC	(Serbia) Marko Maksimović	6^{7}	3
7	(Argentina) Thiago Agustín Tirante	7^{9}	6

Qualifying competition
WC	(Serbia) Branko Djuric	6^{2}	6	6
7	(Argentina) Thiago Agustín Tirante	7^{7}	2	4

==== Third qualifier ====
First round
3	(Hungary) Márton Fucsovics	6	6
Aslan Karatsev	4	1
Marat Sharipov	3	4
6	(Croatia) Duje Ajduković	6	6

Qualifying competition
3	(Hungary) Márton Fucsovics	7	6
6	(Croatia) Duje Ajduković	5	3

==== Fourth qualifier ====
First round
4	(Germany) Yannick Hanfmann	4	4
(Slovakia) Lukáš Klein	6	6
(Hungary) Zsombor Piros	6	3	4
8	(Slovakia) Jozef Kovalík	4	6	6

Qualifying competition
(Slovakia) Lukáš Klein	3	6	6
8	(Slovakia) Jozef Kovalík	6	3	1
