= 2024 Belgrade Open =

- Date: 3–9 November
- Category: ATP Tour 250
- Draw: 28S / 16D
- Prize money: €579,320
- Surface: Hard (indoor)
- Location: Belgrade, Serbia
- Venue: Belgrade Arena

Champions

Singles
- (Canada) Denis Shapovalov

Doubles
- (United Kingdom) Jamie Murray / (Australia) John Peers
- Belgrade Open

The 2024 Belgrade Open was a men's tennis tournament played on indoor hard courts. It was the 2nd edition of the event, and part of the ATP 250 tournaments on the 2024 ATP Tour. It took place at the Belgrade Arena from 3 November to 9 November 2024. The tournament was organized as a replacement for the Gijón Open, which had to be relocated due to operational reasons.

== Champions ==
=== Singles ===
- (Canada) Denis Shapovalov def. (Serbia) Hamad Medjedovic, 6–4, 6–4

=== Doubles ===
- (United Kingdom) Jamie Murray / (Australia) John Peers def. (Croatia) Ivan Dodig / (Tunisia) Skander Mansouri 3–6, 7–6^{(7–5)}, [11–9]

== Singles main-draw entrants ==
=== Seeds ===
Country	Player	Rank^{1}	Seed
~~AUS~~	~~Alex de Minaur~~	~~10~~	~~1~~
~~USA~~	~~Tommy Paul~~	~~12~~	~~2~~
ARG	Francisco Cerúndolo	29	3
CZE	Jiří Lehečka	30	4
POR	Nuno Borges	34	5
USA	Brandon Nakashima	35	6
ARG	Tomás Martín Etcheverry	40	7
ITA	Luciano Darderi	43	8
ARG	Mariano Navone	45	9

- ^{1} Rankings are as of 28 October 2024

=== Other entrants ===
The following players received wildcards into the singles main draw:

- (Serbia) Laslo Djere
- (Serbia) Hamad Medjedovic
- (Switzerland) Stan Wawrinka

The following player received entry using a protected ranking:

- (Croatia) Marin Čilić

The following players received entry from the qualifying draw:

- (Serbia) Branko Djuric
- (Hungary) Márton Fucsovics
- (Slovakia) Lukáš Klein
- (Canada) Denis Shapovalov

The following player received entry as a lucky loser:

- (Croatia) Duje Ajduković

=== Withdrawals ===
- (Argentina) Sebastián Báez → replaced by (Serbia) Miomir Kecmanović
- (Italy) Flavio Cobolli → replaced by (United States) Aleksandar Kovacevic
- (Australia) Alex de Minaur → replaced by (Croatia) Duje Ajduković
- (Netherlands) Tallon Griekspoor → replaced by (Serbia) Dušan Lajović
- (Czech Republic) Tomáš Macháč → replaced by Pavel Kotov
- (Italy) Lorenzo Musetti → replaced by (China) Shang Juncheng
- (United States) Tommy Paul → replaced by (Germany) Daniel Altmaier
- (Chile) Alejandro Tabilo → replaced by (France) Alexandre Müller
- (United States) Frances Tiafoe → replaced by (Australia) James Duckworth

== Doubles main-draw entrants ==
=== Seeds ===
Country	Player	Country	Player	Rank^{1}	Seed
GBR	Jamie Murray	AUS	John Peers	70	1
FRA	Sadio Doumbia	FRA	Fabien Reboul	71	2
URU	Ariel Behar	USA	Robert Galloway	82	3
CRO	Ivan Dodig	TUN	Skander Mansouri	86	4

- Rankings are as of 28 October 2024

=== Other entrants ===
The following pairs received wildcards into the doubles main draw:

- (Serbia) Branko Djuric / (Serbia) Marko Maksimović
- ~~(Serbia) Miomir Kecmanović / (Serbia) Hamad Medjedovic~~

=== Withdrawals ===
- (Finland) Harri Heliövaara / (United Kingdom) Henry Patten → replaced by (Ecuador) Gonzalo Escobar / (Ecuador) Diego Hidalgo
- (Serbia) Miomir Kecmanović / (Serbia) Hamad Medjedovic → replaced by (Argentina) Tomás Martín Etcheverry / (Argentina) Thiago Agustín Tirante
- (Netherlands) Wesley Koolhof / (Croatia) Nikola Mektić → replaced by (Czech Republic) Petr Nouza / (Czech Republic) Patrik Rikl
- (United States) Nathaniel Lammons / (United States) Jackson Withrow → replaced by (France) Jonathan Eysseric / (France) Alexandre Müller
- (Australia) Max Purcell / (Australia) Jordan Thompson → replaced by (Serbia) Ivan Sabanov / (Serbia) Matej Sabanov
