= Belgrade Open =

Defunct tennis tournament
- Founded: 2021; 4 years ago
- Abolished: 2024
- Location: Belgrade; Serbia
- Venue: Belgrade Arena (2024); Novak Tennis Center (2021)
- Category: ATP Tour 250
- Surface: Hard – indoors (2024); Clay (2021)
- Draw: 28S / 16Q / 16D
- Website: serbiaopen.org

Current champions (2024)
- Men's singles: (Canada) Denis Shapovalov
- Men's doubles: (United Kingdom) Jamie Murray / (Australia) John Peers

The Belgrade Open (Serbian: Отворено првенство Београда / Otvoreno prvenstvo Beograda, or Београд опен / Beograd open) was an ATP 250 event. The tournament was first held in 2021 on clay on a single-year licence. The tournament returned in November 2024 on hardcourt as a late replacement for the Gijon Open. In 2025, the tournament was relocated to Athens, Greece as the Hellenic Championship.

== Past finals ==
=== Singles ===
Year	Champion	Runner-up	Score
2021	(Serbia) Novak Djokovic	(Slovakia) Alex Molčan	6–4, 6–3
2022	Not held		
2023	Not held		
2024	(Canada) Denis Shapovalov	(Serbia) Hamad Medjedovic	6–4, 6–4

=== Doubles ===
Year	Champions	Runners-up	Score
2021	(Israel) Jonathan Erlich (Belarus) Andrei Vasilevski	(Sweden) André Göransson (Brazil) Rafael Matos	6–4, 6–1
2022	Not held		
2023	Not held		
2024	(United Kingdom) Jamie Murray (Australia) John Peers	(Croatia) Ivan Dodig (Tunisia) Skander Mansouri	6–4, 3–6, [10–3]
