= Marko Maksimović (tennis) =

Serbian tennis player (born 2006)

- Country (sports): Serbia
- Born: 12 February 2006 (age 20) Brčko, Bosnia and Herzegovina
- Height: 1.85 m (6 ft 1 in)
- Turned pro: 2021
- Plays: Right-Handed
- Coach: Ivan Bjelica
- Prize money: US $26,412

Singles
- Career record: 0–0
- Career titles: 0
- Highest ranking: No. 837 (17 November 2025)
- Current ranking: No. 1,015 (15 June 2026)

Grand Slam singles results
- Wimbledon Junior: 1R (2024)
- US Open Junior: 1R (2024)

Doubles
- Career record: 0–1
- Career titles: 0
- Highest ranking: No. 369 (5 January 2026)
- Current ranking: No. 433 (15 June 2026)

Grand Slam doubles results
- Wimbledon Junior: 2R (2024)
- US Open Junior: 1R (2024)
- Last updated on: 18 June 2026.

Marko Maksimović (Serbian Cyrillic: Марко Максимовић; born 12 February 2006) is a Serbian professional tennis player. He has a career-high ATP singles ranking of world No. 837 achieved on 17 November 2025 and a doubles ranking of No. 369 achieved on 5 January 2026.

== Early life ==
Maksimović was born in Brčko, Bosnia and Herzegovina. As a junior, he relocated to Belgrade to train at the Novak Djokovic Academy. He later chose to represent Serbia, citing better training conditions and development opportunities compared to those available in Bosnia and Herzegovina.

== Career ==
=== Junior career ===
Maksimović won the season-ending Tennis Europe Junior Masters in Monte Carlo in 2021, competing in the U16 category.

In 2024, Maksimović competed in the junior Grand Slam tournaments at the US Open and Wimbledon in both singles and doubles. His best result was reaching the second round of the doubles event at Wimbledon.

=== Senior career ===
Maksimović was named a sparring partner for Serbia in their 2024 Davis Cup World Group I tie against Greece.

In November 2024, Maksimović was awarded a wildcard into both the singles qualifying draw and the main draw of the doubles event at the 2024 Belgrade Open. In singles, he lost in the first round of qualifying to Argentine player Thiago Agustín Tirante. In doubles, he partnered with compatriot Branko Đurić, but they were defeated in the first round by the Ecuadorian duo of Gonzalo Escobar and Diego Hidalgo.

== Personal life ==
Maksimović has cited Novak Djokovic and Dominic Thiem as his role models.

== ATP Challenger and ITF World Tennis Tour finals ==
=== Singles: 1 (runner-up) ===
Legend ATP Challenger Tour (0–0) ITF World Tennis Tour (0–1)	Finals by surface Hard (0–0) Clay (0–1) Grass (0–0)

Result	W–L	Date	Tournament	Tier	Surface	Opponent	Score
Loss	0–1	Mar 2025	M15 Rovinj, Croatia	WTT	Clay	(Ukraine) Viacheslav Bielinskyi	3–7, 6–7^{(3–7)}

=== Doubles: 4 (2 titles, 2 runner-ups) ===
Legend ATP Challenger Tour (0–0) ITF World Tennis Tour (2–2)	Finals by surface Hard (0–0) Clay (2–2) Grass (0–0)

Result	W–L	Date	Tournament	Tier	Surface	Partner	Opponents	Score
Win	1–0	Feb 2025	M15 Antalya, Turkey	WTT	Clay	(Serbia) Stefan Popović	(Italy) Giuseppe La Vela (Italy) Pietro Marino	6–3, 5–7, [10–8]
Loss	1–1	Feb 2025	M15 Antalya, Turkey	WTT	Clay	(Bosnia and Herzegovina) Andrej Nedić	(Bosnia and Herzegovina) Mirza Bašić (Bosnia and Herzegovina) Nerman Fatić	6–2, 5–7, [7–10]
Win	2–1	Jun 2025	M25 Kiseljak, Bosnia and Herzegovina	WTT	Clay	(Bosnia and Herzegovina) Mirza Bašić	(Bosnia and Herzegovina) Fatih Šišić (Croatia) Antonio Voljavec	7–5, 6–3
Loss	2–2	Aug 2025	M25 Maribor, Slovenia	WTT	Clay	(Serbia) Dušan Obradović	(Croatia) Admir Kalender; Pavel Verbin	4–6, 5–7
