= Branko Đurić (tennis) =

Serbian tennis player (born 2005)

Branko Djuric
- Full name: Branko Đurić
- Native name: Бранко Ђурић
- Country (sports): Serbia
- Born: 10 February 2005 (age 21) Podgorica, Serbia and Montenegro
- Height: 1.88 m (6 ft 2 in)
- Turned pro: 2019
- Plays: Right-handed (two-handed backhand)
- Coach: Nenad Djuric, Günter Bresnik
- Prize money: US $61,681

Singles
- Career record: 0–3 (at ATP Tour level, Grand Slam level, and in Davis Cup)
- Career titles: 0
- Highest ranking: No. 448 (20 October 2025)
- Current ranking: No. 500 (19 October 2026)

Doubles
- Career record: 0–1 (at ATP Tour level, Grand Slam level, and in Davis Cup)
- Career titles: 0
- Highest ranking: No. 1,578 (19 May 2025)
- Current ranking: No. 1,977 (19 October 2026)
- Last updated on: 19 October 2026.

Branko Đurić (born 10 February 2005) is a Serbian tennis player. He has a career-high ATP singles ranking of World No. 448 achieved on 20 October 2025.

== Early life ==
Đurić was born in Budva, Montenegro. When he was 11 years old, he moved to Belgrade, Serbia to pursue his tennis career. A member of the Gunter Bresnik academy, he is coached by his father Nenad Đurić.

== Junior career ==
Đurić had mixed results on the ITF junior circuit, maintaining a 75–27 singles win-loss record. He moved into the top 10 of the junior rankings in March 2023. This came after a run of three consecutive J300 competition finals, including victories in Cairo and Casablanca.

He was a runner-up in the boys' doubles category at the 2023 Wimbledon Championships, with French Arthur Géa. The pair got there with a quarterfinal win over Aleksandar Meler Kletzler and Rodrigo Pacheco Méndez. In the semifinals, they defeated American pair Darwin Blanch and Roy Horovitz. In the final, they were defeated by Jakub Filip and Gabriele Vulpitta.

Đurić qualified for the 2023 ITF Junior Finals.

== Professional career ==
In November 2024, Đurić was awarded a wildcard into the singles qualifying of the 2024 Belgrade Open, where he qualified for his main draw ATP debut with wins over French Luka Pavlovic and Argentine Thiago Agustín Tirante. He was also given a wildcard into the main draw of the doubles event alongside compatriot Marko Maksimović.

== ITF World Tennis Tour finals ==
=== Singles: 8 (5 title, 3 runner-ups) ===
| Legend ITF WTT (5–3) | Finals by surface Hard (0–1) Clay (5–2) |

| Result | W–L | Date | Tournament | Tier | Surface | Opponent | Score |
|---|---|---|---|---|---|---|---|
| Win | 1–0 | Oct 2023 | M15 Bad Waltersdorf, Austria | WTT | Clay | (Poland) Marcel Zielinski | 6–1, 6–2 |
| Loss | 1–1 | Feb 2024 | M15 Kish Island, Iran | WTT | Clay | (Romania) Filip Cristian Jianu | 5–7, 4–6 |
| Loss | 1–2 | Jan 2025 | M15 Monastir, Tunisia | WTT | Hard | (Belgium) Gilles-Arnaud Bailly | 4–6, 2–6 |
| Win | 2–2 | Mar 2025 | M15 Alaminos, Cyprus | WTT | Clay | (Switzerland) Damien Wenger | 6–3, 6–2 |
| Win | 3–2 | Apr 2025 | M15 Kursumlijska Banja, Serbia | WTT | Clay | (Serbia) Ognjen Milic | 6–1, 6–3 |
| Loss | 3–3 | May 2025 | M15 Kursumlijska Banja, Serbia | WTT | Clay | (Czech Republic) Jonáš Forejtek | 2–6, 2–6 |
| Win | 4–3 | Jun 2026 | M15 Kursumlijska Banja, Serbia | WTT | Clay | (Italy) Andrea de Marchi | 2–0 ret. |
| Win | 5–3 | Jun 2026 | M15 Kursumlijska Banja, Serbia | WTT | Clay | (Italy) Andrea de Marchi | 5–7, 7–5, 6–3 |

== Junior Grand Slam finals ==
=== Doubles: 1 (runner-up) ===
| Result | Year | Tournament | Surface | Partner | Opponents | Score |
|---|---|---|---|---|---|---|
| Loss | 2023 | Wimbledon | Grass | (France) Arthur Géa | (Czech Republic) Jakub Filip (Italy) Gabriele Vulpitta | 3–6, 3–6 |
