= Tennis European Junior Championships =

European junior tennis tournament

European Junior Tennis Championships
- Status: active
- Genre: sports event
- Date: midyear
- Frequency: annual
- Inaugurated: 1976
- Organiser: European Tennis Association (ETA)

The Tennis European Junior Championships are the European championships for tennis players who are in the age range recognized by Tennis Europe as junior athletes. The event was organized by the European Tennis Association (ETA), now known as Tennis Europe.

Alongside the five Super Category events and the season-ending Junior Masters, the European Junior Championships remains the most popular and prestigious tournament in the Junior Tennis calendar year of the Tennis Europe Junior Tour, for players and national federations alike. Thirteen former and current world No. 1 feature amongst the previous singles champions.

== History ==
The European Junior Championships were inaugurated in 1976 and have been held annually ever since for three age groups; 14, 16, and 18 & Under. With the emergence of the ATP Tour in 1990, the Tennis Europe Junior Tour was also created, and the European Junior Championships are now a part of its Junior calendar year.

The only players who have reached two finals in the U14 events are Kent Carlsson (1981/82) and Răzvan Sabău (1990/91), with the former winning both while the latter lost in 1990, but won in 1991. The only players who have won both the singles and doubles tournaments in the U14 events are Johan Sjogren in 1977 (paired with Jörgen Windahl), Florian Loddenkemper in 1984, Kamil Čapkovič in 2000 (paired with Peter Miklusicak), Novak Djokovic in 2001 (paired with Bojan Božović), Jérôme Inzerillo in 2004 (paired with Nassim Slilam), Bogdan Borza in 2011 (paired with Nicolae Frunză), and Thijs Boogaard in 2022. The finalists in both 2004 and 2011 paired together in doubles and won.

== Results ==
=== European Junior Championships 14 & Under ===
Year	Men's Champion	Score	Men's Runner-up	Women's Champion	Score	Women's Runner-up
1976	(Sweden) Stefan Svensson	6–1, 3–6, 6–1	(Austria) Ingo Wimmer	(Switzerland) Isabelle Villiger	6–4, 6–4	(Italy) Patrizia Murgo
1977	(Sweden) Johan Sjogren	6–0, 6–2	(Germany) Christian Schultes	(Germany) Claudia Kohde-Kilsch	7–5, 6–1	(Belgium) Marlene De Wouters
1978	(Sweden) Mats Wilander	6–4, 6–3	(Italy) Stefano Girodat	(Czechoslovakia) Irene Petru	6–1, 6–2	(Soviet Union) Julia Salnikova
1979	(Sweden) Ulf Borjesson	0–6, 7–6, 6–3	(Germany) Axel Krieg	(Germany) Kiki Reuter	6–4, 6–4	(Soviet Union) Natalia Reva
1980	(Sweden) Stefan Edberg	6–7, 6–3, 8–6	(Sweden) Jonas Svensson	(Hungary) Andrea Temesvari	6–2, 7–5	(Bulgaria) Manuela Maleeva
1981	(Sweden) Kent Carlsson	6–2, 6–4	(France) François Errard	(Bulgaria) Manuela Maleeva	6–2, 6–4	(Soviet Union) Viktoria Milvidskaia
1982	(Sweden) Kent Carlsson	6–1, 6–0	(Czech Republic) Petr Korda	(Germany) Steffi Graf	1–6, 6–2, 11–9	(Czechoslovakia) Andrea Holíková
1983	(France) Arnaud Boetsch	6–2, 6–3	(Sweden) Per Henricsson	(Germany) Steffi Graf	6–3, 6–2	(Germany) Sabine Hack
1984	(Germany) Florian Loddenkemper	4–6, 6–4, 6–4	(Soviet Union) Andrei Cherkasov	(Czechoslovakia) Radka Zrubáková	6–1, 6–4	(France) Alexia Dechaume
1985	(Sweden) Nicklas Kulti	6–0, 6–0	(Netherlands) Paul Dogger	(Netherlands) Bettina Sonnenfeld	7–5, 6–0	(Soviet Union) Irina Zvereva
1986	(Czech Republic) Martin Damm	6–3, 6–3	(Sweden) Roger Pettersson	(Socialist Federal Republic of Yugoslavia) Monica Seles	6–0, 6–2	(Bulgaria) Elena Pampoulova
1987	(Austria) Reinhard Wawra	6–3, 7–6	(Czech Republic) Pavel Gazda	(Czechoslovakia) Radka Bobková	7–6, 6–3	(Italy) Eleonora Agnolozzi
1988	(Sweden) Thomas Enqvist	7–5, 6–4	(Czech Republic) Karol Kučera	(Bulgaria) Magdalena Maleeva	6–3, 6–4	(Socialist Federal Republic of Yugoslavia) Barbara Mulej
1989	(United States) Thomas Johansson	7–6, 6–3	(Germany) Hendrik Dreekmann	(Bulgaria) Lubomira Bacheva	7–5, 6–4	(France) Angelique Olivier
1990	(France) Maxime Boyé	7–6, 2–6, 6–4	(Romania) Răzvan Sabău	(Socialist Federal Republic of Yugoslavia) Iva Majoli	6–1, 6–1	(Israel) Anna Smashnova
1991	(Romania) Răzvan Sabău	6–1, 6–3	(Spain) Juan Antonio Saiz	(Czechoslovakia) Alena Havrlíková	6–1, 6–2	(Germany) Mirela Vladulescu
1992	(Spain) Alberto Martín	6–4, 5–7, 6–3	(France) Olivier Mutis	(Switzerland) Martina Hingis	3–6, 6–2, 6–4	(Hungary) Rita Kuti-Kis
1993	(Slovenia) Michel Kratochvil	6–1, 6–1	(Czech Republic) Michal Tabara	(Hungary) Réka Vidáts	7–5, 6–2	(France) Anne-Gaëlle Sidot
1994	(Italy) Federico Luzzi	7–5, 3–6, 6–1	(Russia) Artem Derepasko	(Germany) Marlene Weingärtner	6–7, 6–3, 6–2	(Germany) Stephanie Kovacic
1995	(Slovakia) Miloslav Grolmus	2–6, 6–1, 7–5	(Belgium) Olivier Rochus	(Slovenia) Tina Pisnik	6–1, 6–3	(Slovakia) Gabriela Voleková
1996	(Spain) Tommy Robredo	6–1, 6–3	(Bulgaria) Todor Enev	(Belgium) Justine Henin	6–2, 6–1	(Greece) Eleni Daniilidou
1997	(France) Julien Maigret	5–7, 6–4, 7–6	(Germany) Simon Stadler	(Germany) Caroline Raba	6–3, 2–6, 6–3	(Russia) Elena Bovina
1998	(Croatia) Mario Ančić	2–6, 6–3, 6–2	(Australia) Stefan Wiespeiner	(Russia) Lina Krasnoroutskaya	4–6, 6–3, 6–3	(Germany) Scarlett Werner
1999	(France) Richard Gasquet	6–1, 6–1	(Germany) Jerome Becker	(Czech Republic) Petra Cetkovská	3–6, 6–3, 6–4	(Estonia) Kaia Kanepi
2000	(Slovakia) Kamil Čapkovič	1–6, 6–1, 6–3	(Germany) Daniel Müller	(Czech Republic) Barbora Strýcová	6–4, 6–3	(Slovenia) Andreja Klepač
2001	(Serbia) Novak Djokovic	6–2, 6–7, 6–3	(Slovakia) Lukáš Lacko	(France) Tatiana Golovin	6–3, 6–2	(Romania) Monica Niculescu
2002	(Spain) Roberto Bautista Agut	6–3, 7–5	(Croatia) Marin Čilić	(Netherlands) Michaëlla Krajicek	7–6, 6–2	(Germany) Angelique Kerber
2003	(Belarus) Andrei Karatchenia	6–4, 6–3	(Czech Republic) Michal Konečný	(Romania) Raluca Olaru	6–3, 6–3	(Romania) Sorana Cîrstea
2004	(France) Jérôme Inzerillo	7–6, 3–6, 6–0	(France) Nassim Slilam	(Netherlands) Renée Reinhard	5–7, 6–2, 7–6	(Switzerland) Stefanie Vögele
2005	(Bulgaria) Grigor Dimitrov	6–0, 7–6	(Czech Republic) Radim Urbanek	(Russia) Ksenia Pervak	1–6, 6–1, 6–3	(Hungary) Lucia Batta
2006	(Spain) Carlos Boluda	6–1, 6–3	(Slovakia) Robert Gasparetz	(Netherlands) Richèl Hogenkamp	6–1, 6–3	(Belarus) Anna Orlik
2007	(Romania) Ciprian Alexandru Porumb	7–6, 6–4	(Czech Republic) Jiří Veselý	(France) Kristina Mladenovic	6–4, 6–2	(Slovakia) Vivien Juhászová
2008	(Netherlands) Moos Sporken	3–6, 6–2, 7–5	(Latvia) Mārtiņš Podžus	(Slovakia) Petra Uberalová	7–5, 6–2	(Russia) Daria Gavrilova
2009	(Serbia) Nikola Milojević	6–2, 6–0	(United Kingdom) Kyle Edmund	(Bulgaria) Viktoriya Tomova	6–2, 6–2	(Czech Republic) Petra Rohanová
2010	(Italy) Gianluigi Quinzi	6–1, 6–2	(Italy) Filippo Baldi	(Netherlands) Indy de Vroome	6–3, 6–3	(Czech Republic) Kateřina Siniaková
2011	(Romania) Bogdan Borza	6–4, 6–2	(Romania) Nicolae Frunză	(Croatia) Ana Konjuh	6–4, 3–6, 6–1	(Switzerland) Belinda Bencic
2012	(Sweden) Mikael Ymer	4–6, 6–3, 6–3	(Norway) Casper Ruud	(Ukraine) Olga Fridman	4–6, 7–5, 6–2	(Hungary) Dalma Gálfi
2013	(France) Corentin Moutet	6–2, 6–1	(Italy) Samuele Ramazzotti	(Russia) Evgeniya Levashova	6–2, 6–2	(Czech Republic) Markéta Vondroušová
2014	(Germany) Rudolf Molleker	6–0, 6–1	(Czech Republic) Tomas Jirousek	(Russia) Anastasia Potapova	6–1, 2–6, 6–2	(Russia) Olesya Pervushina
2015	(Croatia) Duje Ajduković	6–4, 2–6, 6–2	(Romania) Filip Cristian Jianu	(Poland) Iga Świątek	6–2, 6–1	(Russia) Taisiya Pachkaleva
2016	(Czech Republic) Dalibor Svrčina	7–6, 6–3	(Italy) Lorenzo Musetti	(Malta) Helene Pellicano	6–4, 6–1	(Czech Republic) Denisa Hindová
2017	(Denmark) Holger Rune	6–2, 6–1	(Serbia) Hamad Međedović	(Ukraine) Daria Lopatetska	6–3, 6–2	(Russia) Oksana Selekhmeteva
2018	(France) Sean Cuenin	6–2, 6–3	(Croatia) Mili Poljičak	(Czech Republic) Linda Nosková	6–0, 6–3	(Russia) Diana Shnaider
2019	(Czech Republic) Vojtech Petr	2–6, 6–3, 6–2	(Croatia) Dino Prižmić	(Greece) Michaela Laki	6–3, 6–2	(Turkey) Melisa Ercan
2020	Tournament cancelled due to the COVID-19 pandemic					
2021	(Switzerland) Nikola Djosic	5–7, 7–6^{(7–4)}, 6–3	(Czech Republic) Jan Kumstat	(Czech Republic) Tereza Valentová	6–3, 2–6, 6–3	(Russia) Alina Korneeva
2022	(Netherlands) Thijs Boogaard	6–3, 6–2	(Germany) Mariano Dedura-Palomero	(Czech Republic) Alena Kovačková	5–7, 6–2, 6–4	(Slovakia) Mia Pohánková
2023	(Slovenia) Svit Suljić	3–6, 6–3, 6–3	(France) Daniel Jade	(Serbia) Luna Vujović	6–3, 6–3	(Serbia) Dusica Popovski
2024	(Netherlands) Stan Put	6–0, 4–6, 6–4	(United Kingdom) Scott Watson	(Bosnia and Herzegovina) Tea Kovačević	^{7}6–7, 6–4, 6–4	(Czech Republic) Jana Kovačková
2025	(Greece) Rafael Pagonis	6–1, 3–6, 6–2	(Netherlands) Laurens Drijver	(Latvia) Darina Matvejeva	6–0, 4–6, 6–1	(Belgium) Hannelore Daniels
2026	(Switzerland) Jonas Wälti	6–2, 6–1	(Switzerland) Richard Mitchell	(Estonia) Elizaveta Anikina	3–6, 6–3, 6–2	(Ukraine) Mariia Kocherzhenko

=== European Junior Championships 16 & Under ===
Year	Men's Champion	Score	Men's Runner-up	Women's Champion	Score	Women's Runner-up
1976	(France) Yannick Noah	6–1, 6–2	(Netherlands) Marc Albert	(Germany) Eva Pfaff	6–3, 6–0	(France) Martine Bureau
1977	(Spain) Gabriel Urpí	6–3, 6–2	(Spain) Fernando Soler	(Germany) Eva Pfaff	7–6, 6–2	(Czech Republic) Hana Mandlíková
1978	(Sweden) Hans Simonsson	6–2, 6–3	(Austria) Otto Oberparleiter	(Czech Republic) Hana Mandlíková	6–4, 6–0	(Soviet Union) Svetlana Cherneva
1979	(Sweden) Mats Wilander	3–6, 6–0, 6–1	(France) Henri Leconte	(France) Francoise Gardette	6–4, 5–7, 9–7	(Germany) Claudia Kohde-Kilsch
1980	(Sweden) Mats Wilander	3–6, 7–5, 6–0	(Germany) Hans Schwaier	(Switzerland) Lilian Drescher	6–4, 6–4	(Soviet Union) Julia Salnikova
1981	(Germany) Michael Westphal	6–3, 6–1	(Spain) Emilio Sánchez	(Hungary) Andrea Temesvári	4–6, 6–3, 6–2	(Switzerland) Susanne Schmid
1982	(Sweden) Stefan Edberg	7–5, 6–3	(Sweden) Jonas Svensson	(Hungary) Andrea Temesvári	6–3, 6–1	(Germany) Myriam Schropp
1983	(Sweden) Kent Carlsson	6–3, 6–3	(Socialist Federal Republic of Yugoslavia) Bruno Orešar	(Italy) Federica Bonsignori	4–6, 6–2, 6–2	(Sweden) Helena Dahlström
1984	(Austria) Horst Skoff	2–6, 7–6, 6–2	(Greece) Tasos Bavelas	(Czech Republic) Andrea Holíková	2–6, 7–6, 6–2	(Germany) Sabine Hack
1985	(France) Arnaud Boetsch	6–1, 7–6	(Sweden) Per Henricsson	(Czech Republic) Radka Zrubáková	6–2, 6–3	(France) Sybille Niox-Château
1986	(Soviet Union) Andrei Cherkasov	7–6, 6–0	(Soviet Union) Vladimir Petrushenko	(Spain) Arantxa Sánchez Vicario	6–4, 6–1	(France) Alexia Dechaume-Balleret
1987	(Sweden) Nicklas Kulti	6–4, 6–3	(Sweden) Ola Kristiansson	(Spain) Conchita Martínez	6–3, 6–0	(Germany) Steffi Menning
1988	(Czech Republic) Martin Damm	6–4, 6–3	(France) Fabrice Santoro	(Austria) Helmut Ritter	6–1, 6–2	(Italy) Cathy Caverzasio
1989	(Romania) Dinu Pescariu	7–6, 6–1	(Czech Republic) Lukas Thomas	(Germany) Anke Huber	3–6, 6–4, 6–3	(Romania) Irina Spîrlea
1990	(Romania) Andrei Pavel	3–6, 7–5, 6–3	(Sweden) Thomas Enqvist	(Romania) Irina Spîrlea	6–4, 7–6	(Slovenia) Barbara Mulej
1991	(Czech Republic) Filip Kascak	7–6, 7–6	(Spain) Albert Costa	(Bulgaria) Lubomira Bacheva	1–6, 6–4, 6–2	(France) Angelique Olivier
1992	(Czech Republic) David Škoch	7–6, 6–2	(France) Nicolas Escudé	(Germany) Andrea Glass	7–5, 6–1	(Austria) Barbara Schett
1993	(Czech Republic) Stefan Koubek	6–4, 7–6	(Israel) Jonathan Erlich	(Slovakia) Ludmila Richterová	6–2, 6–1	(Switzerland) Martina Hingis
1994	(Spain) Alberto Martín	7–6, 6–3	(Austria) Markus Hipfl	(Italy) Alice Canepa	7–6, 6–3	(Slovakia) Henrieta Nagyová
1995	(Germany) Daniel Elsner	6–4, 6–2	(France) Arnaud Di Pasquale	(Hungary) Réka Vidáts	7–5, 7–6	(Germany) Stephanie Kovacic
1996	(Georgia (country)) Irakli Labadze	6–4, 6–2	(Czech Republic) Robin Vik	(Slovakia) Andrea Šebová	7–6, 3–6, 6–0	(Slovakia) Silvia Uríčková
1997	(France) Julien Maes	7–6, 3–6, 6–1	(Slovakia) Gasper Martinjak	(Spain) Lourdes Domínguez Lino	6–4, 6–7, 6–1	(Greece) Eleni Daniilidou
1998	(Spain) Tommy Robredo	6–4, 6–2	(Belgium) Stefan Wauters	(Czech Republic) Dája Bedáňová	6–1, 6–3	(Greece) Eleni Daniilidou
1999	(Switzerland) Stéphane Bohli	6–7, 7–5, 7–5	(Croatia) Mario Ančić	(Switzerland) Marie-Gaïané Mikaelian	6–4, 3–6, 7–5	(Croatia) Ivana Abramović
2000	(Italy) Pietro Ansaldo	6–3, 1–6, 6–3	(Czech Republic) Ivo Minář	(Estonia) Kaia Kanepi	6–3, 3–6, 6–3	(France) Marion Bartoli
2001	(France) Jo-Wilfried Tsonga	4–6, 7–6, 6–0	(Cyprus) Marcos Baghdatis	(Czech Republic) Petra Cetkovská	6–1, 6–4	(Hungary) Virág Németh
2002	(Spain) Bartolomé Salvá Vidal	6–1, 6–3	(France) Gaël Monfils	(Romania) Monica Niculescu	6–3, 7–6	(Lithuania) Aurelija Misevičiūtė
2003	(Italy) Fabio Fognini	6–0, 2–6, 6–3	(Russia) Alexandre Krasnoroutskiy	(Romania) Mădălina Gojnea	6–1, 6–2	(Romania) Monica Niculescu
2004	(Croatia) Marin Čilić	3–6, 6–1, 6–2	(Poland) Grzegorz Panfil	(Romania) Mihaela Buzărnescu	6–2, 6–4	(Spain) Carla Suárez Navarro
2005	(Slovakia) Martin Kližan	7–6, 6–2	(France) Jérôme Inzerillo	(France) Alizé Cornet	6–3, 6–2	(Spain) Maite Gabarrús-Alonso
2006	(Netherlands) Tim van Terheijden	7–6, 0–6, 6–3	(Portugal) Gastão Elias	(Romania) Irina-Camelia Begu	6–4, 6–2	(Poland) Katarzyna Piter
2007	(Bulgaria) Grigor Dimitrov	6–3, 6–4	(Italy) Andrea Stucchi	(Romania) Simona Halep	6–0, 7–5	(Russia) Ksenia Pervak
2008	(Finland) Henri Laaksonen	6–2, 6–2	(Germany) Dominik Schulz	(Hungary) Tímea Babos	7–5, 6–1	(Italy) Martina Trevisan
2009	(Slovakia) Filip Horanský	6–3, 6–2	(Spain) Axel Álvarez	(Russia) Polina Vinogradova	6–4, 7–5	(Netherlands) Polina Leykina
2010	(France) Mathias Bourgue	6–4, 7–5	(France) Grégoire Barrère	(Spain) Silvia García	7–5, 7–6^{(7–3)}	(Slovakia) Anna Karolína Schmiedlová
2011	(France) Enzo Couacaud	6–2, 6–1	(Sweden) Elias Ymer	(France) Jade Suvrijn	6–1, 6–4	(Spain) Sara Sorribes Tormo
2012	(Austria) Lucas Miedler	7–6, 5–7, 6–4	(France) Johan Tatlot	(Spain) Sara Sorribes Tormo	6–4, 6–3	(Czech Republic) Kateřina Siniaková
2013	(Russia) Andrey Rublev	6–3, 4–6, 6–3	(Russia) Roman Safiullin	(Russia) Daria Kasatkina	6–3, 6–3	(Switzerland) Jil Teichmann
2014	(France) Corentin Moutet	6–7, 6–0, 6–1	(Sweden) Mikael Ymer	(Hungary) Fanny Stollár	6–4, 6–0	(Russia) Anna Blinkova
2015	(Czech Republic) Patrik Rikl	6–4, 6–1	(Russia) Artem Dubrivnyy	(Czech Republic) Anna Slováková	6–0, 2–6, 6–3	(Russia) Elena Rybakina
2016	(Spain) Alberto Colás	0–6, 7–6, 6–2	(Spain) Nikolás Sánchez Izquierdo	(Serbia) Olga Danilović	6–3, 6–1	(Poland) Iga Świątek
2017	(Russia) Timofey Skatov	6–3, 6–1	(Romania) Nini Gabriel Dica	(Poland) Maja Chwalińska	7–6, 6–0	(Sweden) Caijsa Hennemann
2018	(Spain) Carlos Alcaraz	6–4, 6–3	(Denmark) Elmer Moller	(Latvia) Kamilla Bartone	6–1, 6–3	(Latvia) Patrīcija Špaka
2019	(France) Mehdi Sadaoui	6–4, 6–2	(France) Max Westphal	(Russia) Polina Kudermetova	7–6^{(7–3)}, 7–5	(France) Elsa Jacquemot
2020	Tournament cancelled due to the COVID-19 pandemic					
2021	Tournament cancelled due to the COVID-19 pandemic					
2022	(Austria) Joel Schwärzler	6–4, 6–4	(Spain) Martín Landaluce	(Serbia) Mia Ristić	6–1, 6–1	(Spain) Marta Soriano
2023	(Germany) Justin Engel	7–5, 7–6^{(7–4)}	(Finland) Linus Lagerbohm	(Belgium) Jeline Vandromme	6–4, 6–3	(Slovakia) Mia Pohánková
2024	(Romania) Yannick Alexandrescou	6–2, 6–1	(Spain) Tito Chávez	(Italy) Carla Giambelli	7–6^{4}, 7–6^{6}	(Slovakia) Soňa Depešová
2025	(Slovakia) Leon Sloboda	3–6, 6–4, 6–3	(Netherlands) Stan Put	(Austria) Anna Pircher	7–5, 6–1	(Netherlands) Antonia Stoyanov
2026	(Netherlands) Stan Put	6–2, 7–6	(Hungary) István Damján Mokán	(Germany) Milena Steinkamp	7–5, 6–3	(Germany) Victoria Brand

=== European Junior Championships 18 & Under ===
Year	Men's Champion	Score	Men's Runner-up	Women's Champion	Score	Women's Runner-up
1976	(Germany) Wolfgang Popp	6–3, 1–6, 6–3	(Spain) Francisco Ferrer	(Italy) Manuela Zoni	6–3, 6–4	(Sweden) Anne-Carin Månsson
1977	(Sweden) Goran Bergstrand	0–6, 6–1, 7–6	(Sweden) Stefan Simonsson	(Czechoslovakia) Hana Strachoňová	6–3, 6–3	(Germany) Sylvia Hanika
1978	(Czechoslovakia) Ivan Lendl	6–0, 6–3	(Sweden) Per Hjertquist	(Czechoslovakia) Hana Strachoňová	6–4, 6–2	(Soviet Union) Elena Bondarenko
1979	(Germany) Christoph Zipf	6–1, 6–4	(Germany) Hans-Dieter Beutel	(Netherlands) Marianne van der Torre	6–3, 6–1	(Sweden) Lena Sandin
1980	(Sweden) Hans Simonsson	6–3, 4–6, 6–2	(France) Thierry Tulasne	(Netherlands) Nanette Schutte	6–4, 3–6, 6–4	(Switzerland) Isabelle Villiger
1981	(Sweden) Mats Wilander	4–6, 6–2, 6–3	(Socialist Federal Republic of Yugoslavia) Slobodan Živojinović	(Switzerland) Lilian Drescher	6–, 6–4	(Soviet Union) Viktoria Milvidskaia
1982	(Sweden) Henrik Sundström	6–3, 7–5	(France) Tarik Benhabiles	(Bulgaria) Manuela Maleeva	6–3, 6–4	(Sweden) Helena Olsson
1983	(Czechoslovakia) Karel Nováček	6–4, 6–3	(Spain) Emilio Sánchez	(Austria) Petra Huber	5–7, 6–1, 6–1	(Soviet Union) Natalia Reva
1984	(Netherlands) Christian Feenstra	7–6, 6–1	(Czechoslovakia) Martin Střelba	(Bulgaria) Manuela Maleeva	6–3, 6–7, 6–3	(Italy) Federica Bonsignori
1985	(Sweden) Christian Bergström	6–2, 5–7, 7–5	(Italy) Claudio Pistolesi	(Czechoslovakia) Andrea Holíková	6–3, 6–1	(Soviet Union) Leila Meskhi
1986	(Spain) Tomás Carbonell	6–4, 7–5	(Italy) Omar Camporese	(Czech Republic) Radka Zrubáková	6–1, 4–6, 6–2	(Soviet Union) Leila Meskhi
1987	(Soviet Union) Andrei Cherkasov	6–1, 6–4	(Sweden) Nicklas Utgren	(Czechoslovakia) Hana Adámková	7–6, 6–2	(France) Alexia Dechaume-Balleret
1988	(Netherlands) Jacco Eltingh	6–0, 6–0	(Denmark) Frederik Fetterlein	(Spain) Conchita Martínez	6–4, 5–7, 6–3	(Czechoslovakia) Jana Pospíšilová
1989	(Finland) Aki Rahunen	6–3, 6–3	(Czechoslovakia) Martin Damm	(France) Noëlle van Lottum	7–5, 7–6	(Italy) Nathalie Baudone
1990	(Austria) Reinhard Wawra	6–2, 7–5	(Soviet Union) Oleg Ogorodov	(Austria) Marion Maruska	6–4, 7–5	(Netherlands) Kristie Boogert
1991	(Spain) Alberto Berasategui	6–3, 6–1	(Denmark) Kenneth Carlsen	(France) Alexandra Fusai	0–6, 7–5, 3–0 r.	(Czechoslovakia) Petra Krupová
1992	(Belgium) Christophe Van Garsse	6–2, 6–4	(Poland) Adam Skrzypczak	(Romania) Cătălina Cristea	6–4, 6–3	(Czechoslovakia) Květa Hrdličková
1993	(Spain) Albert Costa	6–4, 6–3	(Czech Republic) Jiří Novák	(France) Sarah Pitkowski-Malcor	6–0, 7–6	(Luxembourg) Anne Kremer
1994	(Spain) Carlos Moyá	6–3, 3–6, 6–1	(Netherlands) Rogier Wassen	(Switzerland) Martina Hingis	7–6, 6–1	(Czechoslovakia) Lenka Němečková
1995	(Netherlands) Peter Wessels	6–4, 7–5	(Belarus) Vladimir Voltchkov	(Russia) Anna Kournikova	6–4, 6–4	(Poland) Aleksandra Olsza
1996	(France) Sébastien Grosjean	2–6, 6–2, 6–4	(Czech Republic) Michal Tabara	(Hungary) Petra Mandula	6–2, 6–7, 7–6	(Spain) Laura Pena
1997	(France) Arnaud Di Pasquale	4–6, 6–4, 6–4	(Czech Republic) Petr Kralert	(Austria) Barbara Schwartz	6–3, 6–4	(Denmark) Eva Dyrberg
1998	(Sweden) Andreas Vinciguerra	6–3, 2–6, 7–6	(Spain) Feliciano López	(Denmark) Eva Dyrberg	6–4, 3–0 r.	(Slovenia) Katarina Srebotnik
1999	(France) Éric Prodon	6–2, 6–2	(Switzerland) Michael Lammer	(France) Stéphanie Foretz	7–6, 3–6, 6–4	(Spain) Anabel Medina Garrigues
2000	(United Kingdom) Lee Childs	3–6, 6–1, 6–4	(Slovakia) Karol Beck	(Ukraine) Yuliya Beygelzimer	6–4, 6–3	(Armenia) Marie-Gaïané Mikaelian
2001	(Sweden) Robin Söderling	6–4, 6–3	(Switzerland) Stéphane Bohli	(Armenia) Marie-Gaïané Mikaelian	7–5, 7–6	(France) Marion Bartoli
2002	(Czech Republic) Ivo Minář	6–4, 6–2	(Czech Republic) Tomáš Berdych	(Czech Republic) Eva Birnerová	7–5, 6–2	(Czech Republic) Petra Cetkovská
2003	(Spain) Daniel Gimeno Traver	6–4, 6–4	(Cyprus) Marcos Baghdatis	(France) Tatiana Golovin	6–7, 6–1, 6–2	(France) Anaïs Laurendon
2004	(Spain) Bartolomé Salvá Vidal	6–1, 7–6	(Netherlands) Igor Sijsling	(Czech Republic) Kateřina Böhmová	6–2, 6–0	(Switzerland) Timea Bacsinszky
2005	(Netherlands) Thiemo de Bakker	7–6, 6–3	(France) Alexandre Sidorenko	(Hungary) Ágnes Szávay	6–1, 6–2	(Romania) Monica Niculescu
2006	(France) Jonathan Eysseric	7–6, 6–4	(Czech Republic) Dušan Lojda	(Spain) Carla Suárez Navarro	7–6, 7–5	(France) Youlia Fedossova
2007	(Czech Republic) Michal Konečný	7–5, 7–5	(Netherlands) Thomas Schoorel	(Switzerland) Stefanie Vögele	6–4, 6–2	(Georgia (country)) Oksana Kalashnikova
2008	(France) Guillaume Rufin	6–4, 6–4	(Finland) Henri Kontinen	(Romania) Elena Bogdan	6–4, 6–2	(France) Cindy Chala
2009	(Canada) Steven Diez	6–4, 4–6, 7–5	(Hungary) Márton Fucsovics	(Romania) Elora Dabija	6–4, 4–6, 6–4	(Netherlands) Richèl Hogenkamp
2010	(Bosnia and Herzegovina) Damir Džumhur	6–1, 6–3	(Spain) Andrés Artuñedo	(Slovakia) Jana Čepelová	6–2, 6–3	(Spain) Lara Arruabarrena
2011	(Spain) Roberto Carballés Baena	7–5, 7–6	(Bulgaria) Dimitar Kuzmanov	(Slovenia) Nastja Kolar	6–1, 6–2	(Ukraine) Sofiya Kovalets
2012	(Belgium) Kimmer Coppejans	6–2, 6–3	(Portugal) Frederico Ferreira Silva	(Slovakia) Petra Uberalová	6–3, 6–2	(Turkey) Başak Eraydın
2013	(Russia) Karen Khachanov	3–6, 6–3, 6–4	(France) Quentin Halys	(Czech Republic) Barbora Krejčíková	6–2, 6–4	(Switzerland) Karin Kennel
2014	(France) Quentin Halys	6–4, 7–5	(France) Corentin Denolly	(Spain) Sara Sorribes Tormo	6–4, 6–1	(Spain) Paula Badosa
2015	(Sweden) Mikael Ymer	6–3, 6–2	(Spain) Bernabé Zapata Miralles	(Hungary) Anna Bondár	2–6, 6–3, 6–1	(Switzerland) Jil Teichmann
2016	(Greece) Stefanos Tsitsipas	7–6, 5–3 r.	(France) Corentin Moutet	(Russia) Amina Anshba	6–4, 2–6, 6–2	(Russia) Olesya Pervushina
2017	(Hungary) Zsombor Piros	6–4, 7–5	(France) Corentin Moutet	(Slovenia) Kaja Juvan	6–3, 1–6, 6–4	(Ukraine) Marta Kostyuk
2018	(Czech Republic) Jonáš Forejtek	6–7, 7–6, 6–3	(Bulgaria) Adrian Andreev	(Denmark) Clara Tauson	6–3, 6–3	(Poland) Maja Chwalińska
2019	(France) Valentin Royer	6–1, 3–6, 6–3	(Czech Republic) Dalibor Svrčina	(Belarus) Anna Kubareva	6–2, 7–6	(Sweden) Caijsa Hennemann
2020	Tournament cancelled due to the COVID-19 pandemic					
2021	(Ukraine) Viacheslav Bielinskyi	7–5, 6–3	(Bulgaria) Petr Nesterov	(Croatia) Antonia Ružić	7–5, 2–0 r.	(Switzerland) Alina Granwehr
2022	(Belgium) Gilles-Arnaud Bailly	6–2, 6–3	(Croatia) Dino Prižmić	(Andorra) Victoria Jiménez Kasintseva	6–2, 6–3	(Switzerland) Céline Naef
2023	(Switzerland) Patrick Schoen	6–2, 6–3	(France) Tiago Pires	(Spain) Ariana Geerlings	6–1, 6–2	(Slovakia) Nina Vargová
2024	(Romania) Luca Preda	6–3, 6–1	(Italy) Jacopo Vasamì	(Serbia) Teodora Kostović	6–1, 6–0	(Czech Republic) Alena Kovačková
2025	(Germany) Niels McDonald	6–2, 7–5	(Romania) Yannick Theodor Alexandrescou	(Sweden) Nellie Taraba Wallberg	6–4, 7–6	(Spain) Charo Esquiva
2026	(Austria) Thilo Behrmann	6–3, 3–6, 7–5	(Austria) Florian Zimmer	(Serbia) Lana Virc	4–6, 7–6^{7}, 6–2	(Slovakia) Kali Šupová

== See also ==
- Petits As
- ITF Junior Circuit
