= Tennis Europe Junior Masters =

European junior tennis tournament

- Status: active
- Genre: sports event
- Date: lateyear
- Frequency: annual
- Inaugurated: 1996
- Organiser: European Tennis Association (ETA)

The Tennis Europe Junior Masters is the season-ending championship of the U14 circuit of the Tennis Europe Junior Tour. The event was organized by the European Tennis Association (ETA), now known as Tennis Europe. The event has been organized by the Monégasque Tennis Federation ever since 2021, when it began being held in Monte Carlo.

It is the most significant tennis event in the U14 circuit of the Tennis Europe calendar year after the five Super Categories and the European Junior Championships, as it features the top eight boys and girls in the under-14 and under-16 categories based on their results throughout the season. Future world No. 1s Kim Clijsters and Rafael Nadal capped their best seasons on the U14 circuit by winning the event in 1997 and 2000 respectively, while players such as Andy Murray, Alexander Zverev, Simona Halep and Belinda Bencic are all former medalists.

== History ==
The season-ending Junior Masters was launched in 1996 with the purpose of rewarding the best-performing players of the year. The Masters officially brings the season to an end, and features the six best European players of both the U14 and U16 circuits based on that season's rankings, plus the finalists of the European Junior Championships. Reggio Calabria hosted the event until 2021, when it began being held on the clay courts of the Monte-Carlo Country Club, also home to the ATP Masters 1000 tournament in Monte-Carlo, under the High Patronage of HSH Prince Albert II of Monaco. From 2023, four Junior Masters players are selected to receive a once-in-a-lifetime stay at the Red Bull Athlete Performance Centre, where they will have a unique opportunity to hone their performance and potential.

The Masters, which has worldwide media coverage and is seen as the scouting event for future stars, is broadcast on national television in Monaco and live-streamed online. In 2022, Alena Kovačková became the first player to finish at No. 1 in both Race Rankings age categories. She ultimately chose to play in the U16 competition (which she won), giving the ninth-ranked player of the girls’ U14 list a spot in the event.

== Format ==
The 2023 edition featured a revised format, adopting a round-robin phase in line with the ATP and WTA Finals. The eight qualifiers are separated into two groups of four, ensuring three live matches before the two group winners face off in the grand final.

== Results ==
=== Tennis Europe Junior Masters 14 & Under ===
Year	Men's Champion	Score	Men's Runner-up	Women's Champion	Score	Women's Runner-up
1996	(Spain) Tommy Robredo	6–2, 7–5	(France) Paul-Henri Mathieu	(Croatia) Jelena Pandžić	6–0, 6–2	(Slovakia) Katarína Bašternáková
1997	(Russia) Filipp Moukhometov	6–4, 6–4	(Romania) Adrian Cruciat	(Belgium) Kim Clijsters	6–3, 4–6, 6–3	(Slovakia) Martina Babáková
1998	(Croatia) Ivan Stelko	6–2, 6–1	(Czech Republic) Miloslav Tutter	(Czech Republic) Pavlina Tichá	3–6, 6–1, 6–2	(Germany) Scarlett Kotschwara
1999	(Israel) Dudi Sela	6–1, 6–1	(Romania) Adrian Ungur	(Estonia) Kaia Kanepi	6–0, 6–0	(Hungary) Virág Németh
2000	(Spain) Rafael Nadal	3–6, 6–3, 6–2	(Belarus) Alexander Skrypko	(Poland) Marta Domachowska	6–4, 6–1	(Romania) Delia Sescioreanu
2001	(Slovenia) Blaž Kavčič	7–6, 6–7, 7–5	(Bulgaria) Kiril Dmitrov	(Federal Republic of Yugoslavia) Vojislava Lukić	7–5, 6–2	(Slovakia) Jarmila Gajdošová
2002	(Belarus) Dmitriy Novikov	6–4, 1–6, 6–4	(Czech Republic) Dušan Lojda	(Belarus) Olga Govortsova	6–3, 7–5	(Poland) Marta Leśniak
2003	(Croatia) Ivan Marević	6–3, 3–6, 5–7	(Czech Republic) Roman Jebavý	(Romania) Raluca Olaru	7–5, 2–6, 6–4	(Romania) Sorana Cîrstea
2004	(Lithuania) Ričardas Berankis	6–4, 6–1	(Croatia) Luka Somen	(Netherlands) Renée Reinhard	6–7, 6–1, 6–1	(Slovakia) Martina Balogová
2005	(Russia) Andrey Kuznetsov	6–1, 6–2	(Belgium) Yannik Reuter	(Russia) Viktoria Kamenskaya	6–3, 6–4	(Romania) Simona Halep
2006	(Spain) Carlos Boluda	6–4, 6–2	(Spain) Javier Martí	(Slovakia) Vivien Juhászová	7–6, 7–5	(Belarus) Anna Orlik
2007	(Czech Republic) Lukáš Vrňák	6–4, 6–4	(Slovakia) Filip Horanský	(Russia) Daria Gavrilova	5–7, 6–3, 6–3	(Italy) Martina Trevisan
2008	(United Kingdom) Liam Broady	6–3, 6–4	(Germany) Kevin Kaczynski	(Russia) Yulia Putintseva	6–3, 6–3	(Slovakia) Petra Uberalová
2009	(Czech Republic) Robin Staněk	7–5, 6–2	(Czech Republic) Marek Routa	(Russia) Ksenija Sharifova	4–6, 6–3, 6–2	(Israel) Valeria Patiuk
2010	(United Kingdom) Joshua Sapwell	6–4, 7–6	(Germany) Johannes Härteis	(Russia) Ulyana Ayzatulina	6–2, 2–6, 6–2	(Romania) Ilka Csöregi
2011	(Germany) Alexander Zverev	6–3, 7–6	(Romania) Nicolae Frunza	(Switzerland) Belinda Bencic	6–3, 6–1	(Russia) Anastasiya Rychagova
2012	(Spain) Eduard Güell Bartrina	6–3, 6–1	(Switzerland) Marko Osmakcic	(Hungary) Dalma Gálfi	7–5, 2–6, 6–4	(Russia) Anna Kalinskaya
2013	(Italy) Samuele Ramazzotti	6–3, 6–2	(Belarus) Jurij Rodionov	(Russia) Evgeniya Levashova	6–3, 6–3	(Russia) Amina Anshba
2014	(Germany) Nicola Kuhn	6–2, 6–2	(Serbia) Marko Miladinović	(Russia) Anastasia Potapova	6–4, 7–6	(Bosnia and Herzegovina) Adela Joldić
2015	(Romania) Filip Cristian Jianu	7–5, 7–5	(Russia) Timofey Skatov	(Malta) Helene Pellicano	6–3, 3–6, 7–6	(Ukraine) Marta Kostyuk
2016	(Romania) Radu Papoe	6–2, 6–4	(Denmark) Holger Rune	(Italy) Federica Sacco	6–4, 6–3	(Russia) Maria Timofeeva
2017	(Italy) Luca Nardi	6–2, 6–1	(United Kingdom) Jack Pinnington Jones	(Russia) Diana Shnaider	6–4, 6–1	(Russia) Maria Bondarenko
2018	(Russia) Konstantin Zhzhenov	6–4, 6–4	(Czech Republic) Hynek Bartoň	(Serbia) Fatma Idrizović	7–6, 6–2	(Bulgaria) Katerina Dimitrova
2019	(Croatia) Dino Prižmić	6–4, 7–5	(Romania) Mihai Alexandru Coman	(Croatia) Petra Marčinko	6–3, 6–0	(Czech Republic) Amélie Šmejkalová
2020	Tournament cancelled due to the COVID-19 pandemic					
2021	(Germany) Max Schönhaus	7–5, 7–5	(Germany) Justin Engel	(Czech Republic) Laura Samson	6–3, 2–6, 6–3	(Romania) Eva Maria Ionescu
2022	(Germany) Diego Dedura	6–0, 6–2	(Ukraine) Nikita Bilozertsev	(France) Ksenia Efremova	6–4, 6–4	(Slovakia) Soňa Depešová
2023	(France) Daniel Jade	6–1, 6–1	(Turkey) Kaan Işık Koşaner	(Czech Republic) Jana Kovačková	6–4, 6–1	(Poland) Barbara Kostecka
2024	(United Kingdom) Scott Watson	6–4, 3–6, 6–3	(Spain) Toni Escarda Piñeiro	(United Kingdom) Megan Knight	6–1, 6–4	(Czech Republic) Katerina Zajíčková
2025	(Greece) Rafael Pagonis	4–6, 6–4, 6–3	(Slovakia) Max Lorinčík	(Turkey) Zeliha Nil Çukurluoğlu	2–6, 6–2, 6–1	(Denmark) Emilia Henningsen

=== European Junior Championships 16 & Under ===
Year	Men's Champion	Score	Men's Runner-up	Women's Champion	Score	Women's Runner-up
1996	(France) Julien Jeanpierre	6–3, 6–2	(Romania) Teodor-Dacian Crăciun	(Italy) Antonella Serra Zanetti	6–2, 6–2	(Slovakia) Andrea Šebová
1997	(Italy) Filippo Volandri	4–6, 6–3, 3–0 r.	(Italy) Diego De Vecchis	(Russia) Elena Bovina	6–2, 6–4	(Italy) Flavia Pennetta
1998	(Romania) Octavian Nicodim	6–1, 7–5	(Russia) Dmitry Vlasov	(Spain) Marta Marrero	6–3, 6–2	(Italy) Maria Elena Camerin
1999	(Romania) Adrian Cruciat	7–6, 6–0	(Croatia) Ivan Stelko	(Sweden) Sofia Arvidsson	6–4, 6–4	(Romania) Edina Gallovits
2000	(Czech Republic) Ivo Minář	6–1, 6–4	(Poland) Adam Chadaj	(Italy) Lisa Tognetti	6–3, 6–7, 6–2	(Croatia) Mia Kurek
2001	(Spain) David Villanueva	7–5, 6–4	(Romania) Adrian Ungur	(Croatia) Nadia Pavić	6–2, 6–2	(Croatia) Nika Ožegović
2002	(Spain) Marcel Granollers	6–1, 6–2	(Greece) Zacharias Katsigiannakis	(Romania) Monica Niculescu	7–6, 3–6, 6–1	(Spain) Adriana González-Peñas
2003	(Croatia) Franko Škugor	6–3, 6–1	(Spain) Roberto Velilla	(Romania) Mihaela Buzărnescu	6–3, 6–4	(Spain) Katia Sabate
2004	(Russia) Pavel Chekhov	6–3, 6–4	(Spain) Pere Riba	(Romania) Alexandra Dulgheru	1–6, 6–3, 6–1	(Romania) Mihaela Buzărnescu
2005	(Moldova) Radu Albot	6–2, 4–6, 6–1	(North Macedonia) Iliya Martinoski	(Russia) Ksenia Lykina	7–6, 6–1	(Spain) Eugenia Vertesheva
2006	(Italy) Alessandro Giannessi	6–4, 6–0	(Italy) Davide Della Tommasina	(Georgia (country)) Ekaterine Gorgodze	6–4, 6–7, 7–5	(Belarus) Maria Meliuk
2007	(Spain) Carlos Boluda	6–1, 6–4	(Spain) Javier Martí	(Belarus) Sviatlana Pirazhenka	6–3, 6–0	(Serbia) Doroteja Erić
2008	(Hungary) Mate Zsiga	4–6, 6–3, 6–2	(Belarus) Pavel Filin	(Romania) Cristina Dinu	6–2, 4–6, 7–5	(Romania) Ingrid Radu
2009	(Serbia) Miki Janković	7–5, 6–4	(Italy) Michele Palma	(Serbia) Jovana Jakšić	7–5, 6–4	(Ukraine) Hanna Poznikhirenko
2010	(Spain) Eduard Esteve Lobato	6–2, 6–2	(Spain) Pol Toledo Bagué	(Romania) Cristina Ene	3–6, 6–0, 6–0	(Russia) Tamara Pichkhadze
2011	(Slovakia) Matej Maruscak	6–2, 6–4	(Ukraine) Alexander Lebedyn	(Croatia) Ana Konjuh	6–3, 6–2	(Romania) Ioana Loredana Roșca
2012	(Spain) Jaume Munar Clar	6–3, 6–0	(Czech Republic) Daniel Orlita	(Spain) Sara Sorribes Tormo	7–5, 6–2	(Belarus) Iryna Shymanovich
2013	(Hungary) Máté Valkusz	6–2, 6–1	(Czech Republic) Daniel Orlita	(Romania) Ioana Mincă	6–4, 6–1	(Belarus) Hanna Kryvatulava
2014	(Hungary) Máté Valkusz	5–7, 6–4, 6–1	(Serbia) Bojan Jankulovski	(Serbia) Kristina Miletić	4–0, ret.	(Germany) Eva Marie Voracek
2015	(Serbia) Marko Miladinović	6–3, 6–4	(Germany) Robert Strombachs	(Spain) Marina Bassols Ribera	6–3, 7–6	(Ukraine) Viktoriia Dema
2016	(Austria) Lukas Krainer	6–4, 7–6	(Serbia) Kristijan Juhas	(Georgia (country)) Mariam Dalakishvili	7–6, 6–3	(Serbia) Tamara Malešević
2017	(Romania) Nini Dica	7–5, 6–1	(Bulgaria) Anthony Genov	(France) Carole Monnet	6–2, 6–2	(Sweden) Caijsa Hennemann
2018	(Bulgaria) Petr Nesterov	6–2, 4–6, 6–2	(Latvia) Daniel Linkuns-Morozovs	(Croatia) Antonia Ružić	6–4, 7–6	(Croatia) Tara Würth
2019	(Slovakia) Peter Nad	6–2, 7–5	(Croatia) Alen Bill	(Russia) Ksenia Zaytseva	6–3, 4–6, 6–3	(Switzerland) Sebastianna Scilipoti
2020	Tournament cancelled due to the COVID-19 pandemic					
2021	(Serbia) Marko Maksimović	7–5, 6–3	(Slovakia) Michal Krajci	(Russia) Mariia Masiianskaia	6–4, 7–5	(Poland) Monika Stankiewicz
2022	(Norway) Nicolai Budkov Kjær	6–4, 6–2	(Sweden) William Rejchtman Vinciguerra	(Czech Republic) Alena Kovačková	6–4, 6–4	(Romania) Diana-Ioana Simionescu
2023	(Hungary) Kolos Kincses	7–6, 6–1	(Finland) Linus Lagerbohm	(Belgium) Jeline Vandromme	6–0, 7–5	(Serbia) Gala Ivanović
2024	(Romania) Yannick Alexandrescou	6–1, 6–0	(Slovenia) Mark Becirovic	(Bosnia and Herzegovina) Tea Kovačević	6–1, 6–4	(Belarus) Vlada Razina
2025	Savva Rybkin	6–1, 6–3	(Netherlands) Stan Put	(Bosnia and Herzegovina) Tea Kovačević	6–3, 6–1	(Romania) Maria Valentina Pop

== See also ==
- Petits As
- Tim Essonne
- Tennis European Junior Championships
- ITF Junior Circuit
