= Jeline Vandromme =

Belgian tennis player (born 2007)

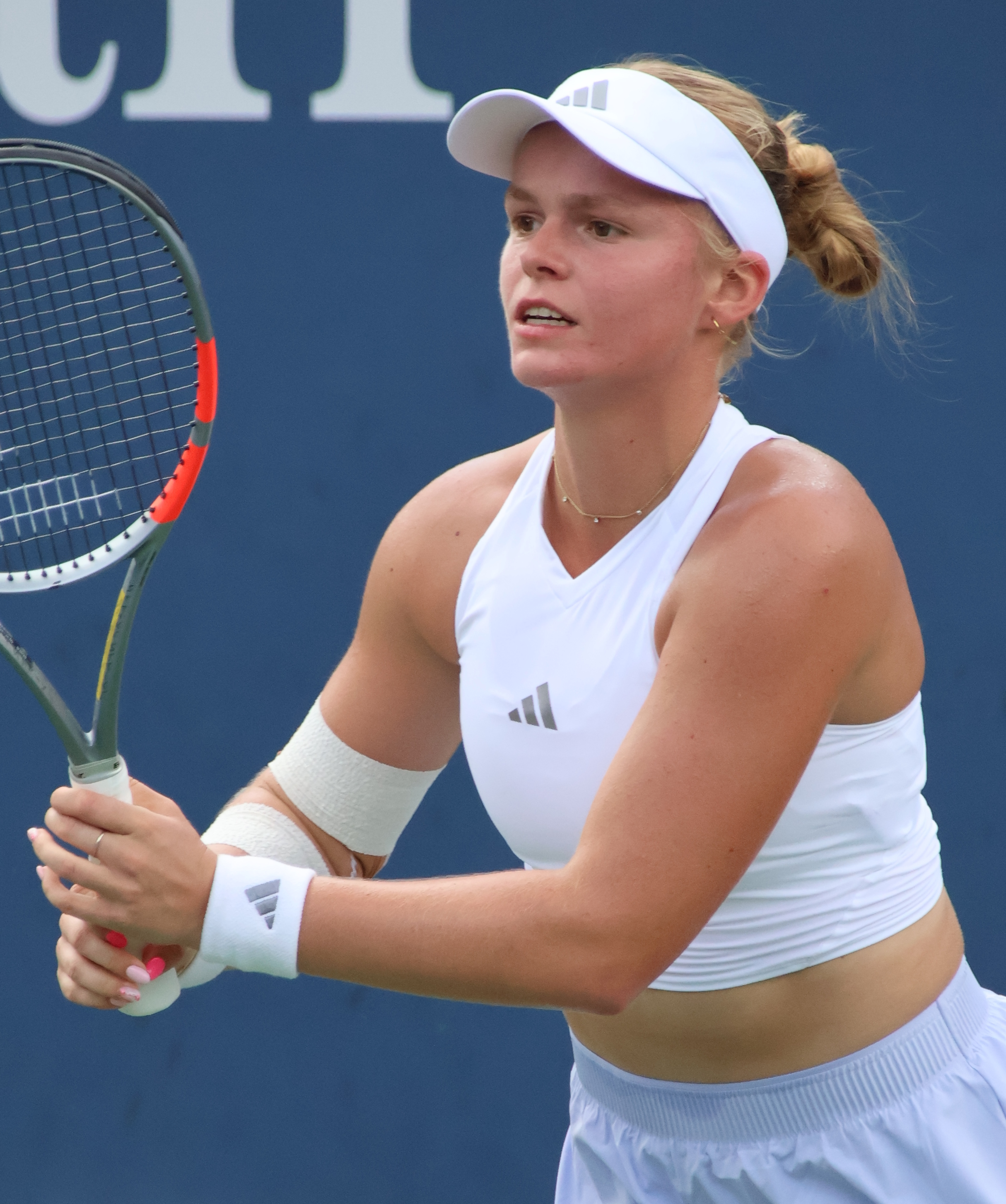
- Vandromme at the 2026 US Open
- Country (sports): Belgium
- Residence: Sint-Kruis, Bruges, Belgium
- Born: 16 November 2007 (age 18) Nieuwpoort, Belgium
- Turned pro: 2025
- Plays: Right (two-handed backhand)
- Coach: Philippe Gelade
- Prize money: $231,821

Singles
- Career record: 99–43
- Career titles: 6 ITF
- Highest ranking: No. 123 (12 October 2026)
- Current ranking: No. 126 (2 November 2026)

Grand Slam singles results
- French Open: Q1 (2026)
- Wimbledon: Q3 (2026)
- US Open: Q2 (2026)

Doubles
- Career record: 12–14
- Career titles: 0
- Highest ranking: No. 986 (13 April 2026)
- Current ranking: No. 1,502 (2 November 2026)
- Last updated on: 2 November 2026.

Jeline Vandromme (born 16 November 2007) is a Belgian tennis player. She has a career-high singles ranking by the WTA of No. 123, achieved on 12 October 2026, and a best doubles ranking of 986, reached on 13 April 2026.

On the ITF Junior Circuit, Vandromme reached a combined ranking of world No. 2 on 27 October 2025. She won the girls' singles title at the 2025 US Open.

== Early life ==
Vandromme was born to Bart Vandromme and Corinne Blondeel. She has an older sister, Justine, and an older brother, Justin. She began playing tennis at the age of five. Originally from Nieuwpoort, West Flanders, she later moved to Sint-Kruis, Bruges, to train at TC Brughia. She also studied Latin at Sint-Andreaslyceum Sint-Kruis and piano at the Conservatory of Bruges.

== Career ==
=== Juniors ===
In January 2023, Vandromme won her first J60 title at the RTC ITF Junior event in Arlon. That September, she won the U16 Tennis European Junior Championships, and in November, she won the U16 Tennis Europe Junior Masters. She was the first Belgian player to win the Junior Masters since Kim Clijsters in 1997.

In early 2024, she won two J300 titles: the Copa Barranquilla and the Astrid Bowl in Charleroi-Marcinelle. She also reached the final of the Memorial Eduardo Ferrero Trophy in Villena. Following her victory in Charleroi, she made her major debut at the French Open in both singles and doubles. In singles, she reached the quarterfinals, before losing to fourth seed Tyra Caterina Grant.

In January 2025, she won the J300 Traralgon Tennis International and reached the girls' singles quarterfinals of the Australian Open. Later that year, she won the girls' singles title at the US Open. She was the first Belgian to win the title since Kirsten Flipkens in 2003. The following month, she also won the year-ending ITF Junior Finals in Chengdu after defeating Kristina Penickova in the final.

=== Professional ===
In August 2023, Vandromme reached the semifinals of the W15 event in Fleurus as a wildcard entrant, upsetting third seed Chihiro Muramatsu and eighth seed Lian Tran in the process.

In February 2025, she won her first professional title at the W15 event in Manacor, defeating Britt du Pree in the final. Later that year, she won the W35 Lexus British Pro Series in Roehampton and two W15 titles in Monastir.

Vandromme made it through to her first WTA 125 final at the Contrexéville Open in July 2026, losing to fifth seed Mayar Sherif in three sets, after squandering a match point in the second set. In November 2026, she made her WTA Tour main-draw debut at the Chennai Open, defeating qualifier Kyōka Okamura, before losing to Robin Montgomery in the second round.

== Performance timeline ==
Key
W	F	SF	QF	#R	RR	Q#	DNQ	A	NH

(W) winner; (F) finalist; (SF) semifinalist; (QF) quarterfinalist; (#R) rounds 4, 3, 2, 1; (RR) round-robin stage; (Q#) qualification round; (DNQ) did not qualify; (A) absent; (NH) not held; (SR) strike rate (events won / competed); (W–L) win–loss record.
To avoid confusion and double counting, these charts are updated at the conclusion of a tournament or when the player's participation has ended.

== WTA 125 finals ==
=== Singles: 1 (runner-up) ===
Result	W–L	Date	Tournament	Surface	Opponent	Score
Loss	0–1	Jul 2026	Contrexéville Open, France	Clay	(Egypt) Mayar Sherif	6–3, 6–7^{(0–7)}, 5–7

== ITF Circuit finals ==
=== Singles: 8 (6 titles, 2 runner-ups) ===
Legend
W75 tournaments (1–1)
W50 tournaments (1–1)
W35 tournaments (1–0)
W15 tournaments (3–0)

Result	W–L	Date	Tournament	Tier	Surface	Opponent	Score
Win	1–0	Mar 2025	ITF Manacor, Spain	W15	Hard	(Netherlands) Britt du Pree	6–2, 6–3
Win	2–0	Aug 2025	ITF Roehampton, United Kingdom	W35	Hard	(China) Shi Han	7–6^{(4)}, 5–7, 7–5
Win	3–0	Aug 2025	ITF Monastir, Tunisia	W15	Hard	(Latvia) Beatrise Zeltiņa	6–3, 6–1
Win	4–0	Aug 2025	ITF Monastir, Tunisia	W15	Hard	(Czech Republic) Alena Kovačková	6–2, 6–1
Loss	4–1	Nov 2025	ITF Petange, Luxembourg	W75	Hard (i)	(Germany) Eva Bennemann	3–6, 2–6
Loss	4–2	Feb 2026	Grenoble Open, France	W50	Hard (i)	(Switzerland) Céline Naef	5–7, 3–6
Win	5–2	Apr 2026	Open Nantes Atlantique, France	W50	Hard (i)	(Germany) Mona Barthel	3–2 ret.
Win	6–2	Apr 2026	ITF Calvi, France	W75	Hard	(Canada) Katherine Sebov	6–0, 6–0

=== Doubles: 1 (runner-up) ===
Legend
W15 tournaments (0–1)

Result	Date	Tournament	Tier	Surface	Partner	Opponents	Score
Loss	Aug 2025	ITF Monastir, Tunisia	W15	Hard	(Bulgaria) Iva Ivanova	(Czech Republic) Alena Kovačková (Czech Republic) Jana Kovačková	5–7, 2–6

== Juniors finals ==
=== Grand Slam tournaments ===
==== Singles: 1 (title) ====
Result	Year	Tournament	Surface	Opponent	Score
Win	2025	US Open	Hard	(Sweden) Lea Nilsson	7–6^{(7–2)}, 6–2

==== Doubles: 1 (runner-up) ====
Result	Year	Tournament	Surface	Partner	Opponents	Score
Loss	2025	US Open	Hard	(Lithuania) Laima Vladson	(Czech Republic) Alena Kovačková (Czech Republic) Jana Kovačková	2–6, 2–6

=== ITF Junior Circuit ===
==== Singles: 12 (10 titles, 2 runner-ups) ====
Legend
JGS (1–0)
Junior Masters (1–0)
J300 (3–1)
J100 (0–1)
J60 (1–0)
Grade 5 (4–0)

Result	W–L	Date	Tournament	Tier	Surface	Opponent	Score
Win	1–0	Aug 2022	ITF Hasselt, Belgium	Grade 5	Clay	(Belgium) Ema Kovacevic	6–2, 6–1
Win	2–0	Sep 2022	ITF Kreuzlingen, Switzerland	Grade 5	Clay	(Switzerland) Kenisha Möning	6–1, 6–2
Win	3–0	Sep 2022	ITF Esch-Alzette, Luxembourg	Grade 5	Hard	(Germany) Maya Drozd	6–3, 6–1
Win	4–0	Dec 2022	ITF Larnaca, Cyprus	Grade 5	Hard	(Czech Republic) Veronika Novaková	6–7^{(4)}, 6–4, 6–3
Win	5–0	Jan 2023	ITF Arlon, Belgium	J60	Carpet	(Switzerland) Jehanne Erard	4–6, 7–6^{(2)}, 6–0
Loss	5–1	Jul 2023	ITF Bruchkoebel, Germany	J100	Clay	Victoria Milovanova	6–4, 5–7, 1–6
Win	6–1	Feb 2024	ITF Barranquilla, Colombia	J300	Hard	(United States) Thea Frodin	6–0, 6–2
Loss	6–2	Mar 2024	ITF Villena, Spain	J300	Clay	(Kazakhstan) Sonja Zhiyenbayeva	5–7, 0–6
Win	7–2	Jun 2024	ITF Charleroi, Belgium	J300	Clay	(Czech Republic) Tereza Krejcová	6–1, 6–1
Win	8–2	Jan 2025	ITF Traralgon, Australia	J300	Hard	(France) Ksenia Efremova	6–3, 6–1
Win	9–2	Sep 2025	US Open, United States	JGS	Hard	(Sweden) Lea Nilsson	7–6^{(2)}, 6–2
Win	10–2	Oct 2025	ITF Junior Finals, China	Junior Masters	Hard	(United States) Kristina Penickova	4–6, 7–6^{(5)}, 7–5

==== Doubles: 12 (9 titles, 3 runner-ups) ====
Legend
JGS (0–1)
J500 (2–0)
J300 (2–1)
J200 (1–1)
J100 (1–0)
J60 (1–0)
Grade 5 (2–0)

Result	W–L	Date	Tournament	Tier	Surface	Partner	Opponents	Score
Win	1–0	Sep 2022	ITF Esch-Alzette, Luxembourg	Grade 5	Hard	(Belgium) Katarina Kujovic	(Netherlands) Kayleigh Didderiens (Belgium) Emelie Thunus	6–4, 6–3
Win	2–0	Nov 2022	ITF Larnaca, Cyprus	Grade 5	Hard	(Belgium) Eline Bex	(Netherlands) Benthe de Bresser (Czech Republic) Viktorie Hazmuková	3–5, 4–0, [11–9]
Win	3–0	Jan 2023	ITF Arlon, Belgium	J60	Carpet	(Belgium) Katarina Kujovic	(Switzerland) Jehanne Erard (Germany) Lea Von Kozierowski	6–3, 6–3
Win	4–0	Jan 2023	ITF Glasgow, United Kingdom	J100	Hard	(Czech Republic) Amelie Justine Hejtmanek	(Czech Republic) Sarah Melany Fajmonová (Czech Republic) Nela Jandová	6–3, 3–6, [10–6]
Loss	4–1	Apr 2023	ITF Istres, France	J200	Clay	(Germany) Tessa Johanna Brockmann	(Benin) Gloriana Nahum (Egypt) Jermine Sherif	5–7, 7–6^{(2)}, [5–10]
Win	5–1	Jul 2023	ITF Basel, Switzerland	J200	Clay	(Ukraine) Anastasiia Firman	Arina Bulatova (Austria) Ekaterina Perelygina	6–4, 6–3
Win	6–1	Feb 2024	ITF Barranquilla, Colombia	J300	Hard	(Slovakia) Mia Pohánková	(United States) Kristina Penickova (United States) Anita Tu	7–5, 7–6^{(2)}
Loss	6–2	Mar 2024	ITF Porto Alegre, Brazil	J300	Clay	(Israel) Mika Buchnik	(United States) Kaitlyn Rolls (Norway) Emily Sartz-Lunde	2–6, 2–6
Win	7–2	Mar 2024	ITF Blumenau, Brazil	J500	Clay	(Brazil) Olivia Carneiro	(United States) Kaitlyn Rolls (Norway) Emily Sartz-Lunde	7–6^{(3)}, 6–7^{(4)}, [10–8]
Win	8–2	Apr 2024	ITF Offenbach, Germany	J500	Clay	(United States) Kaitlyn Rolls	(United Kingdom) Hannah Klugman (United Kingdom) Mimi Xu	3–6, 6–0, [10–7]
Win	9–2	Jun 2024	ITF Charleroi, Belgium	J300	Clay	(United States) Kaitlyn Rolls	(Brazil) Victoria Luiza Barros (Netherlands) Rose Marie Nijkamp	6–4, 6–2
Loss	9–3	Sep 2025	US Open, United States	JGS	Hard	(Lithuania) Laima Vladson	(Czech Republic) Alena Kovačková (Czech Republic) Jana Kovačková	2–6, 2–6
