= Ksenia Efremova =

French tennis player (born 2009)

- Full name: Ksenia Alexeyevna Efremova
- Country (sports): France
- Residence: Alpes-Maritimes, France
- Born: 28 April 2009 (age 17) Moscow, Russia
- Coach: Pierre Debrosse, Yulia Efremova
- Prize money: $217,326

Singles
- Career record: 49–21
- Career titles: 4 ITF
- Highest ranking: No. 575 (5 January 2026)
- Current ranking: No. 590 (27 July 2026)

Grand Slam singles results
- Australian Open: Q1 (2026)
- French Open: 1R (2026)

Doubles
- Career record: 8–6
- Career titles: 1 ITF
- Highest ranking: No. 1,180 (27 July 2026)
- Current ranking: No. 1,180 (27 July 2026)

Grand Slam doubles results
- French Open: 1R (2026)
- Last updated on: 28 July 2026.

Ksenia Efremova (born 28 April 2009) is a French tennis player. She has a career-high singles ranking by the WTA of No. 575, achieved on 5 January 2026, and a best doubles ranking of No. 1,180, reached on 27 July 2026.

Efremova won the girls' singles title at the 2026 Australian Open.

== Early and personal life ==
Ksenia Efremova was born in Moscow, Russia in 2009. She is the daughter of former professional tennis player Julia Efremova and former amateur player Alexey Efremov. She started playing tennis at three years-old and was coached by her mother. Her family, including her brothers Alexei and Vladimir, moved from Russia to near Nice in Alpes-Maritimes on the French Riviera in 2019.

Since the end of 2019, Efremova trained daily at the Mouratoglou Tennis Academy in the South of France under French coach Pierre Debrosse and the supervision of her mother. Efremova's father never lived in France, but visited his family several times on the French Riviera before his death from cancer in Germany in 2021.

The family began the application for naturalization in early 2021, and by September 2023, Efremova, along with her mother and her two brothers, became French nationals.

== Career ==
=== Juniors ===
Efremova was in the spotlight from an early age as a "tennis prodigy". By the age of 11-years-old, she was competing in the 14-year-old age group. On 3 December 2021, just six days after her father died, Efremova won a final in Sweden and dedicated the title to him.

In February 2022, Efremova won the prestigious Tim Essonne Cup, defeating Mariia Makarova in the final. She then leapfrogged to the ITF Juniors under-18 circuit, where she won five titles in categories grade 4 and 5, the first of which just nine days after celebrating her 13th birthday in April. Efremova first came to the tennis world's attention in October 2022, when she won the season-ending Tennis Europe Masters in the under-14 category in Monte-Carlo, Monaco. It was her sixth title of the season on the U14 Tennis Europe circuit.

In January 2023, Efremova reached the semifinals of the Petits As in Tarbes, the world's leading indoor U-14 competition, which she lost to Anna Pushkareva. In February, Efremova defended her Tim Essonne title by beating Sara Oliveriusova in the final. In March, one month away from her 14th birthday, she reached the final of a U-16 tournament in Torelló, Spain, where she narrowly lost it. Despite that heartbreaking result, she was crowned champion in the doubles category, with Adelina Lachinova. That season, the French also won two Europe Super Category events, the first in Maia in May, and the second in Düren in August.

Efremova received a wildcard from the Australian Tennis Federation for the junior tournament of the 2024 Australian Open, where she defeated three opponents, including the fifth seed Tereza Valentová in the first round. She lost in the quarterfinals to the top seed and eventual champion, Renáta Jamrichová.

In February 2024, Efremova represented France at the girls U-16 Zone A team Winter Cup qualifying competition in Feucherolles, but withdrew from the final-round due to an elbow injury. As a consequence, she also missed the entire European clay season. In June, she returned and played in qualifying round at J300 Roehampton, a prestigious grass-court junior event. She won all matches in the qualifying but fell in the first round of the main draw. A few weeks later, she played the girls' singles qualifying at the Wimbledon Championships, losing in the final round.

In January 2026, Efremova won the girls' singles title at the 2026 Australian Open, defeating Ekaterina Tupitsyna in straight sets. With this result, she reached an ITF junior combined ranking of world No. 1 on 2 February 2026.

=== 2023–25: Professional beginnings and first titles ===
In November 2023, the 14-year-old Efremova won her first WTA point after coming through qualifying at an ITF event in Monastir, and beating Camilla Zanolini, and the third seed Yang Yidi en route to the quarterfinals. The following month she won her first ITF title, defeating German Selina Dal in the final, in Monastir. Even though it was only her second main draw at professional events, Efremova won the title without losing a set in the tournament. At 14 years, 8 months, and 3 days she became the youngest player to win an ITF tournament since Sesil Karatantcheva (14 years, 4 months, 6 days) in 2003.

On 8 January 2024, she appeared in the WTA rankings for the first time at 1105th. In July, Efremova received a wildcard that allowed her to play a professional tournament at Monastir, Tunisia. She defeated top and second seeds at this competition, and eventually won her second professional title. She also played doubles at this event, advancing to the final. In October 2025, also in Monastir, she won her fourth singles title, as wells as her first ITF doubles title.

=== 2026: Major debut ===
Efremova made her major debut at the French Open, after receiving a wildcard entry for the main draw. She lost to 18th seed Sorana Cîrstea in the first round.

== ITF Circuit finals ==
=== Singles: 4 (4 titles, 1 runner-up) ===
Legend W35 tournaments (0–1) W15 tournaments (4–0)	Finals by surface Hard (4–1)

Result	W–L	Date	Tournament	Tier	Surface	Opponent	Score
Win	1–0	Dec 2023	ITF Monastir, Tunisia	W15	Hard	(Germany) Selina Dal	7–6^{(5)}, 6–0
Win	2–0	Jul 2024	ITF Monastir, Tunisia	W15	Hard	(United States) Jenna Defalco	1-6, 6–3, 6-2
Win	3–0	Oct 2024	ITF Monastir, Tunisia	W15	Hard	(France) Nina Radovanovic	6-1, 7–5
Win	4–0	Oct 2025	ITF Monastir, Tunisia	W15	Hard	(Ukraine) Masha Lazarenko	6–3, 3–6, 6–2
Loss	4–1	Dec 2025	ITF New Delhi, India	W35	Hard	(South Korea) Park So-hyun	6–2, 4–6, 3–6

=== Doubles: 2 (1 title, 1 runner-up) ===
Legend W15 tournaments (1–1)	Finals by surface Hard (1–1)

Result	W–L	Date	Tournament	Tier	Surface	Partner	Opponents	Score
Loss	0–1	Jul 2024	ITF Monastir, Tunisia	W15	Hard	(Germany) Sophia Ksandinov	(Czech Republic) Zdena Šafářová (France) Marie Villet	1–6, 1–6
Win	1–1	Oct 2025	ITF Monastir, Tunisia	W15	Hard	(Italy) Beatrice Stagno	(Japan) Riko Kikawada (Poland) Dominika Podhajecka	6–4, 6–3

== Junior Grand Slam finals ==
=== Singles: 1 (title) ===
Result	Year	Tournament	Surface	Opponent	Score
Win	2026	Australian Open	Hard	Ekaterina Tupitsyna	6–3, 7–5
