= Bogdan Borza =

Romanian tennis player

- Country (sports): Romania
- Born: 5 April 1997 (age 28) Cugir, Romania
- Plays: Left-handed (two-handed backhand)
- Prize money: $31,472

Singles
- Career record: 1–2 (at ATP Tour level, Grand Slam level, and in Davis Cup)
- Career titles: 0
- Highest ranking: No. 674 (18 June 2018)

Doubles
- Career record: 0–0 (at ATP Tour level, Grand Slam level, and in Davis Cup)
- Career titles: 0
- Highest ranking: No. 1073 (19 June 2017)

Bogdan Borza (born 5 April 1997) is a Romanian tennis player. Borza reached a career high ATP singles ranking of No. 674 achieved on 18 June 2018 and a career high ATP doubles ranking of No. 1,073 achieved on 19 June 2017. Borza represents Romania at the Davis Cup, where he has a W/L record of 1–3.

== Career ==
In 2010, the 13-year-old Borza reached five finals in the U14 circuit of the Tennis Europe Junior Tour and won three of them, including the U14 Dyadora Cup at Timisoara, in which he beat his fellow countryman and junior career rival Nicolae Frunză in the final. Borza started off the 2011 season by winning a national title at the indoor championship held in Bucharest, beating Frunză again en route to the title.

He then participated in Les Petits As, an unofficial world championship for U14 players, where he faced three Americans in a row, coming from behind to beat the tournament favorite Stefan Kozlov in the quarters, 1-6, 6-3, 7-6^{(7–5)}, beating future world No. 10 Frances Tiafoe in the semis, but losing the final to Henrik Wiersholm in three sets. Borza, who had been suffering from a fever on the day of the final, would have taken over the No. 1 slot in the U14 category of the Tennis Europe rankings with a win, but instead he was now just 10 points behind the then leader, Andrey Rublev. Four months later, however, Borza beat Rublev in the final of the U14 Bohemia Cafex Cup in three sets.

In July, Borza competed in the European Junior Championships at Plzeň, beating future World No. 2 Alexander Zverev in the semifinals and then winning the final with a victory over Frunză, while in the doubles final he won alongside him, beating Czech Republic's Miroslav Chyba and Ondrej Krstev. He thus became only the sixth player to win both the singles and doubles tournaments in the U14 events. Borza and Frunză also led Romania to a first-ever Summer Cups victory. In the season-ending Junior Masters at Reggio Calabria, he was eliminated in the semifinals by Zverev. Despite this, Borza finished the season as the No. 1, ahead of the likes of Frunză, Zverev, and Rublev.

Because of these results, many thought that he would become a future world No. 50. However, his level dropped and between 2012 and 2014, he only reached three finals and won just one of them, the 2013 Neocom Open. Borza failed to reach a single final in the ATP tour.
