= Abierto Juvenil Mexicano =

Tournament information
- Founded: 1977
- Location: Mexico City; Mexico
- Venue: Club Deportivo Chapultepec
- Category: ITF Junior Grade A (2004–current); ITF Junior Grade 1 (1998–2003)
- Surface: Red clay - outdoors
- Draw: 64S / 64Q / 32D (Boys); 64S / 48Q / 32D (Girls)
- Website: www.abiertojuvenilmexicano.com

The Abierto Juvenil Mexicano (Note: "Mexican Junior Open") is a prestigious junior tennis tournament played on outdoor red clay courts in November in Mexico City. It is one of five Grade A tournaments, the junior equivalent of ATP Masters or WTA Premier Mandatory events in terms of rankings points allocated.

== History ==
The Abierto Juvenil Mexicano has been classified as a Grade A tournament since 2004. It was previously a Grade 1 tournament from 1998 to 2003. The tournament was founded in 1977 as the Copa Internacional Casablanca.

== Singles champions ==
Year	Boys	Girls
↓ Copa Internacional Casablanca Grade 2 ↓
1993	(Mexico) José Jorge Esqueda Hernández	(Luxembourg) Anne Kremer
1994	(Paraguay) Ramón Delgado	(South Africa) Nannie de Villiers
↓ Grade 1 ↓
1995	(Austria) Clemens Trimmel	(Austria) Barbara Schwartz
1996	(France) Sébastien Grosjean	(Croatia) Mirjana Lučić
1997	(Chile) Nicolás Massú	(Hungary) Zsófia Gubacsi
1998	(Pakistan) Aisam-ul-Haq Qureshi	(Slovakia) Gabriela Voleková
1999	(Germany) Dominik Meffert	(United States) Ansley Cargill
2000	(Romania) Adrian Cruciat	(United States) Ansley Cargill
2001	(Socialist Federal Republic of Yugoslavia) Janko Tipsarević	(Socialist Federal Republic of Yugoslavia) Jelena Janković
2002	(Cyprus) Marcos Baghdatis	(Croatia) Matea Mezak
2003	(Germany) Jerome Becker	(Netherlands) Michaëlla Krajicek
↓ Grade A ↓
2004	(United States) Phillip Simmonds	(United States) Julia Cohen
2005	(United States) Donald Young	(Canada) Aleksandra Wozniak
2006	(Netherlands) Thiemo de Bakker	(United States) Julia Cohen
2007	(Mexico) Eduardo Peralta-Tello	(United States) Julia Cohen
2008	(Mexico) César Ramírez	(Bulgaria) Tanya Raykova
2009	(Guatemala) Julen Urigüen	(Croatia) Ajla Tomljanović
2010	(United States) Denis Kudla	(Japan) Sachie Ishizu
2011	(Brazil) Bruno Sant'Anna	(Belgium) An-Sophie Mestach
↓ Abierto Juvenil Mexicano Grade A ↓
2012	(Italy) Stefano Napolitano	(Russia) Elizaveta Kulichkova
2013	(Serbia) Nikola Milojević	(Switzerland) Belinda Bencic
2014	(United States) Michael Mmoh	(Hungary) Dalma Gálfi
2015	(Argentina) Genaro Olivieri	(United States) Amanda Anisimova
2016	(Serbia) Miomir Kecmanović	(United States) Taylor Johnson
2017	(United States) Drew Baird	(United States) Alexa Noel
↓ Mundial Juvenil Yucatan Grade A ↓
2018	(Argentina) Santiago de la Fuente	(France) Diane Parry
2019	(Argentina) Thiago Agustín Tirante	(Andorra) Victoria Jiménez Kasintseva
2020	Cancelled	Cancelled
2021	(Croatia) Mili Poljičak	(Czech Republic) Brenda Fruhvirtová
2022	(Mexico) Rodrigo Pacheco Méndez	(United States) Clervie Ngounoue
2023	(Mexico) Rodrigo Pacheco Méndez (2)	(Czech Republic) Laura Samson
2024	(France) Thomas Faurel	(Bulgaria) Elizara Yaneva
2025	(Brazil) Luís Miguel	(Czech Republic) Alena Kovačková

== Doubles champions ==
Year	Boys	Girls
↓ Copa Internacional Casablanca Grade 2 ↓
1993	(Mexico) Ricardo Rosas (Mexico) Eduardo Villagómez	(Slovakia) Henrieta Nagyová (Slovakia) Zuzana Nemšáková
1994	(Mexico) Gerardo Venegas Escalente (Mexico) Luis Uribe	(Slovakia) Michaela Hasanová (Slovakia) Martina Nedelková
↓ Grade 1 ↓
1995	(Socialist Federal Republic of Yugoslavia) Vladimir Pavićević (Venezuela) Kepler Orellana	(United States) Andrea Aura Narvaez (United States) Selin Nassi Tekikbas
1996	(France) Rodolphe Cadart (France) Sébastien Grosjean	(Peru) Déborah Gaviria (Slovakia) Silvia Uríčková
1997	(France) Jérôme Haehnel (France) Julien Jeanpierre	(Germany) Gitte Möller (Germany) Lydia Steinbach
1998	(Russia) Artem Derepasko (Russia) Igor Kunitsyn	(Czech Republic) Veronika Koksová (Slovakia) Gabriela Voleková
1999	(United States) John Paul Fruttero (United States) Lesley Joseph	(Slovakia) Martina Babáková (Slovakia) Ľubomíra Kurhajcová
2000	(Mexico) Bruno Echagaray (Mexico) Santiago González	(Czech Republic) Eva Birnerová (United States) Ansley Cargill
2001	(Mexico) Bruno Echagaray (Mexico) Santiago González	(Czech Republic) Eva Birnerová (Netherlands) Ilona Somers
2002	(India) Stephen Amritraj (United Kingdom) Craig Evans	(Czech Republic) Petra Cetkovská (Czech Republic) Lucie Šafářová
2003	(Netherlands) Romano Tatuhey (Netherlands) Bram Ten Berge	(Slovenia) Andreja Klepač (Lithuania) Aurelija Misevičiūtė
↓ Grade A ↓
2004	(United States) Timothy Neilly (United States) Phillip Simmonds	(New Zealand) Marina Eraković (Netherlands) Bibiane Schoofs
2005	(Argentina) Juan Martín del Potro (Venezuela) David Navarrete	(Japan) Ayumi Morita (Japan) Erika Sema
2006	(Netherlands) Thiemo de Bakker (Netherlands) Peter Lucassen	(Netherlands) Marrit Boonstra (Netherlands) Renée Reinhard
2007	(United States) Kellen Damico (Netherlands) Jonathan Eysseric	(United States) Julia Cohen (Mexico) Valeria Pulido
2008	(Mexico) Alfredo Moreno (Mexico) Manuel Sánchez	(United States) Krista Damico (United States) Nadja Gilchrist
2009	(United States) Denis Kudla (United States) Nathan Pascha	(Croatia) Ajla Tomljanović (United Kingdom) Heather Watson
2010	(China) Gao Xin (China) Ouyang Bowen	(Canada) Gabriela Dabrowski (Canada) Marianne Jodoin
2011	(United States) William Kwok (United States) Michael Rinaldi	(Belgium) An-Sophie Mestach (Netherlands) Demi Schuurs
↓ Abierto Juvenil Mexicano Grade A ↓
2012	(United States) Connor Farran (Portugal) Frederico Ferreira Silva	(Russia) Elizaveta Kulichkova (Ukraine) Ganna Poznikhirenko
2013	(Serbia) Nikola Milojević (Portugal) Frederico Ferreira Silva	(Switzerland) Karin Kennel (Belgium) Elise Mertens
2014	(United States) Taylor Fritz (Russia) Andrey Rublev	(Russia) Anna Blinkova (Hungary) Fanny Stollár
2015	(United Kingdom) Jay Clarke (Serbia) Miomir Kecmanović	(Russia) Anna Blinkova (Russia) Evgeniya Levashova
2016	(United States) Andrew Fenty (Israel) Yshai Oliel	(United States) Caty McNally (United States) Natasha Subhash
2017	(United States) Sebastian Korda (Colombia) Nicolás Mejía	(United States) Dalayna Hewitt (United States) Peyton Stearns
↓ Mundial Juvenil Yucatan Grade A ↓
2018	(Argentina) Román Andrés Burruchaga (Argentina) Alejo Lorenzo Lingua Lavallén	(United States) Hurricane Tyra Black (United States) Cori Gauff
2019	(United States) Dali Blanch (Argentina) Thiago Agustín Tirante	(United States) Elizabeth Coleman (Uruguay) Guillermina Grant
2020	Cancelled	Cancelled
2021	(Argentina) Juan Manuel La Serna (Argentina) Lautaro Midon	(Canada) Kayla Cross (Canada) Victoria Mboko
2022	(Bulgaria) Adriano Dzhenev (Bulgaria) Iliyan Radulov	(United Kingdom) Ella McDonald (United Kingdom) Mingge Xu
2023	(Sweden) Sebastian Eriksson (Czech Republic) Maxim Mrva	(United Kingdom) Hannah Klugman (United States) Kaitlin Quevedo
2024	Timofei Derepasko (Kazakhstan) Amir Omarkhanov	(Czech Republic) Alena Kovačková (Czech Republic) Jana Kovačková
2025	(France) Yannick Theodor Alexandrescou (Japan) Ryo Tabata	(United States) Thea Frodin (United States) Annika Penickova
