= Traralgon Tennis International =

AGL Loy Yang Traralgon Junior International

Tournament information
- Location: Traralgon, Victoria; Australia
- Category: ITF Junior Grade A
- Surface: Hard - outdoors
- Draw: 64S / 64Q / 32D
- Website: www.traralgontennis.com.au

Current champions (2026)
- Singles: (Brazil) Luís Guto Miguel - Boys (China) Sun Xinran - Girls
- Doubles: (Brazil) Luís Guto Miguel (Slovenia) Žiga Šeško - Boys; Mariia Makarova; Rada Zolotareva - Girls

The Traralgon Tennis International is held in early January each year in Traralgon, in Victoria, Australia. It is considered a lead-up event for U-18 players to the Australian Open's Junior Championships.

Tennis legend Roger Federer took the boys' singles title in 1998. Other notable winners include Alexander Zverev, Nick Kyrgios, Jelena Dokic, Anastasia Pavlyuchenkova, Monica Puig and Iga Świątek.

Current champions are Brazilian Luís Guto Miguel in boys' singles and Chinese Sun Xinran in girls' singles. Miguel became the first South American champion of the event.

== Past finals ==
=== Singles ===
Year	Champion	Runner-up	Score
2026	(China) Sun Xinran	(France) Ksenia Efremova	6–1, 6–3
2025	(Belgium) Jeline Vandromme	(France) Ksenia Efremova	6–3, 6–1
2024	(Australia) Emerson Jones	(United States) Iva Jovic	7–5, 6–1
2023	(Australia) Melisa Ercan	Mirra Andreeva	2–6, 6–3, 6–4
2022	(Belgium) Sofia Costoulas	(Canada) Kayla Cross	6–4, 6–2
2021	Not held		
2020	(Uzbekistan) Polina Kudermetova	(Italy) Melania Delai	6–1, 6–1
2019	(Denmark) Clara Tauson	(Canada) Leylah Fernandez	6–2, 6–3
2018	(Chinese Taipei) Liang En-shuo	(China) Wang Xiyu	6–4, 0–6, 6–1
2017	(Poland) Iga Świątek	(Ukraine) Marta Kostyuk	6–3, 6–3
2016	(Belarus) Vera Lapko	(Russia) Anna Kalinskaya	1–6, 6–3, 6–4
2015	(Canada) Katherine Sebov	(Australia) Kimberly Birrell	7–5, 6–2
2014	(Russia) Varvara Flink	(France) Fiona Ferro	6–2, 2–6, 6–1
2013	(Kazakhstan) Anna Danilina	(Germany) Antonia Lottner	6–4, 6–2
2012	(United States) Krista Hardebeck	(Slovakia) Anna Karolína Schmiedlová	7–5, 6–4
2011	(Puerto Rico) Mónica Puig	(Kazakhstan) Yulia Putintseva	6–2, 6–4
2010	(Hungary) Tímea Babos	(Japan) Sachie Ishizu	6–2, 6–3
2009	(Russia) Ksenia Kirillova	(Russia) Ksenia Pervak	w/o
2008	(France) Cindy Chala	(Canada) Rebecca Marino	6–4, 6–4
2007	(Bosnia and Herzegovina) Jasmina Tinjić	(Slovakia) Kristína Kučová	1–6, 6–2, 6–1
2006	(Russia) Anastasia Pavlyuchenkova	(Italy) Corinna Dentoni	6–1, 7–5
2005	(Slovakia) Magdaléna Rybáriková	(Australia) Jarmila Wolfe	w/o
2004	(Switzerland) Timea Bacsinszky	(Germany) Angelique Kerber	6–4, 6–4
2003	(Croatia) Nadja Pavić	(New Zealand) Eden Marama	6–2, 6–2
2002	(Sweden) Hanna Nooni	(Australia) Darya Ivanova	6–1, 6–3
2001	(France) Marion Bartoli	(Slovakia) Lenka Dlhopolcová	3–6, 6–3, 6–2
2000	(Australia) Jaslyn Hewitt	(Canada) Marie-Ève Pelletier	6–4, 3–6, 6–4
1999	(Greece) Eleni Daniilidou	(Hungary) Anikó Kapros	6–3, 6–3
1998	(Australia) Jelena Dokic	(New Zealand) Rewa Hudson	6–3, 6–3
1997	(Australia) Bryanne Stewart	(Australia) Evie Dominikovic	6–0, 5–7, 6–2
1996	(France) Karolina Jagieniak	(Czech Republic) Jitka Schönfeldová	6–2, 6–3
1995	(Hungary) Réka Vidáts	(South Africa) Jessica Steck	6–1, 6–1
1994	(Australia) Trudi Musgrave	(Australia) Siobhan Drake-Brockman	2–6, 6–3, 6–2

=== Doubles ===
Year	Champions	Runners-up	Score
2026	Mariia Makarova; Rada Zolotareva	(Australia) Renee Alame (India) Maaya Rajeshwaran Revathi	6–1, 6–4
2025	(United States) Annika Penickova (United States) Kristina Penickova	(Serbia) Teodora Kostović (Romania) Anamaria Federica Oana	6–3, 6–2
2024	(Japan) Wakana Sonobe (United Kingdom) Mika Stojsavljevic	(United Kingdom) Hannah Klugman (United Kingdom) Mimi Xu	7–6^{(7–4)}, 6–3
2023	Mirra Andreeva; Alina Korneeva	(Japan) Sayaka Ishii (Japan) Ena Koike	6–3, 6–2
2022	(Canada) Kayla Cross (Canada) Victoria Mboko	(Canada) Mia Kupres (United Kingdom) Ranah Akua Stoiber	6–3, 4–6, [10–6]
2021	Not held		
2020	(France) Aubane Droguet (France) Séléna Janicijevic	(Italy) Melania Delai (Italy) Lisa Pigato	6–3, 6–2
2019	(Australia) Olivia Gadecki (Australia) Megan Smith	(Japan) Natsumi Kawaguchi (Hungary) Adrienn Nagy	7–5, 3–6, [10–6]
2018	(Chinese Taipei) Joanna Garland (Japan) Himari Satō	(Russia) Alina Charaeva (Uzbekistan) Kamilla Rakhimova	6–4, 4–6, [10–6]
2017	(Poland) Maja Chwalińska (Poland) Iga Świątek	(Australia) Gabriella Da Silva-Fick (Australia) Kaitlin Staines	3–6, 6–3, [10–7]
2016	(Netherlands) Nina Kruijer (Romania) Ioana Mincă	(South Africa) Lee Barnard (South Africa) Zani Barnard	6–3, 6–1
2015	(Belarus) Vera Lapko (Slovakia) Tereza Mihalíková	(Ukraine) Olga Fridman (Russia) Elina Nepliy	7–5, 7–5
2014	(Russia) Anastasiya Komardina (Serbia) Nina Stojanović	(China) Xu Shilin (China) You Xiaodi	7–5, 6–3
2013	(Belgium) Elise Mertens (Turkey) İpek Soylu	(Chinese Taipei) Hsu Ching-wen (China) Xu Shilin	6–3, 1–6, [10–7]
2012	(Hungary) Ilka Csöregi (Russia) Elizaveta Kulichkova	(Japan) Makoto Ninomiya (Japan) Riko Sawayanagi	3–6, 6–3, [10–8]
2011	(Canada) Eugenie Bouchard (Puerto Rico) Monica Puig	(South Korea) Jang Su-jeong (South Korea) Lee So-ra	6–2, 6–1
2010	(Canada) Eugenie Bouchard (Thailand) Luksika Kumkhum	(Slovenia) Nastja Kolar (Croatia) Silvia Njirić	6–1, 6–2
2009	(France) Kristina Mladenovic (Croatia) Silvia Njirić	(Czech Republic) Martina Borecká (Czech Republic) Martina Kubičíková	6–4, 6–3
2008	(Israel) Chen Astrogo (South Africa) Bianca Swanepoel	(Serbia) Bojana Jovanovski Petrović (Serbia) Milana Špremo	6–1, 6–4
2007	(Russia) Anastasia Pavlyuchenkova (Australia) Arina Rodionova	(Russia) Klaudia Boczová (Slovakia) Kristína Kučová	6–2, 6–3
2006	(Australia) Tyra Calderwood (Australia) Jessica Moore	(Russia) Anastasia Pavlyuchenkova (United States) Anna Tatishvili	7–5, 6–4
2005	(Sweden) Nadja Roma (Sweden) Michaela Johansson	(Italy) Sara Errani (Italy) Stella Menna	6–3, 1–6, 6–4
2004	(Germany) Angelique Kerber (Poland) Marta Leśniak	(Sweden) Mari Andersson (Switzerland) Timea Bacsinszky	6–2, 6–0
2003	(Australia) Dubravka Cupac (Australia) Natalie Tanevska	(Luxembourg) Mandy Minella (France) Pauline Parmentier	7–5, 6–4
2002	(India) Sania Mirza (Slovakia) Linda Smoleňáková	(Russia) Nina Bratchikova (Russia) Julia Efremova	4–6, 6–2, 6–4
2001	(Czech Republic) Petra Cetkovská (Czech Republic) Barbora Strýcová	(Slovakia) Lenka Dlhopolcová (Slovakia) Katarína Kachlíková	7–5, 6–3
2000	(United Kingdom) Alice Barnes (United States) Bethanie Mattek-Sands	(Canada) Mélanie Marois (Canada) Marie-Ève Pelletier	7–5, 6–3
1999	(Slovakia) Katarína Bašternáková (Slovakia) Zuzana Kučová	(South Africa) Natalie Grandin (South Africa) Nicole Rencken	4–6, 6–3, 7–6
1998	(New Zealand) Leanne Baker (New Zealand) Rewa Hudson	(Australia) Melanie-Ann Clayton (Australia) Nicole Sewell	6–1, 2–6, 6–4
1997	(Slovakia) Andrea Šebová (Slovakia) Silvia Uríčková	(Australia) Evie Dominikovic (Australia) Amanda Grahame	6–3, 6–1
1996	(Australia) Amy Jensen (Hungary) Anita Kurimay	(Australia) Renee Reid (Australia) Cindy Watson	6–4, 6–4
1995	(Australia) Jenny-Ann Fetch (Australia) Sarah Ann Stanley	(Australia) Renee Reid (Australia) Cindy Watson	6–4, 6–4
1994	(South Korea) Jeon Mi-ra (Philippines) Francesca La'O	(Australia) Trudi Musgrave (Australia) Jodi Richardson	6–3, 6–1
