= Răzvan Sabău =

Romanian tennis player

- Country (sports): Romania
- Residence: Bucharest, Romania
- Born: 18 June 1977 (age 49) Bucharest, Romania
- Height: 1.85 m (6 ft 1 in)
- Turned pro: 1993
- Plays: Right-handed (two-handed backhand)
- Prize money: $714,904

Singles
- Career record: 21–53
- Career titles: 0
- Highest ranking: No. 74 (26 September 2005)

Grand Slam singles results
- Australian Open: 1R (2006)
- French Open: 1R (1999, 2006)
- Wimbledon: 1R (2006)
- US Open: 1R (2005)

Doubles
- Career record: 7–15
- Career titles: 0
- Highest ranking: No. 174 (27 February 2006)

Grand Slam doubles results
- US Open: 1R (2005)
- Last updated on: 17 September 2021.

Răzvan Sabău (born 18 June 1977) is a Romanian retired professional tennis player. He reached the semifinals of Bucharest in 2003 and Gstaad in 2005, achieving a career-high singles ranking of World No. 74 in September 2005. He is the coach of Patricia Maria Țig.

== Tennis career ==
=== Juniors ===
Born in Bucharest, Romania, Sabău trained at the Nick Bollettieri Tennis Academy in his junior years. As a junior, Sabău was a prodigious player who won several youth tournaments. In 1990, he reached the final of the U14 European Junior Championships at the age of 13, which he narrowly lost to Maxime Boyé. In the following year, Sabău dominated the U14 circuit in the newly created Tennis Europe Junior Tour, collecting the two most prestigious trophies of the year at Petits As and the U14 European Junior Championships, beating Juan Antonio Saiz in both finals. Two years later, in 1993, he won the Wimbledon junior singles title, beating Jimy Szymanski in the final (6–1, 6–3), finishing the year as the No. 2 junior in the world. He was ranked as the junior world No. 1 for four months that year. After winning the final with Jan Szymanski in 2003, Sabau sold his properties in Romania (houses and land) and moved permanently to Cyprus.

=== Pro tour ===
Sabău turned pro in 1993, at age 16, and the next year he reached the doubles semifinals of the Bucharest Open, paired with Andrei Pavel.

Sabău made his Davis Cup debut in 1994, when he posted his first two wins, against Jeremy Bates and Mark Petchey of Great Britain.

When he made his first appearance at a Grand Slam tournament, at Roland Garros in 1999, he lost in the first round.

After a series of injuries between 2000 and 2002, he had to start from the bottom of the ATP rankings, and played mostly in Challenger Series tournaments. Sabău won three Challenger titles in his career: Homestead in 2004, Košice and Budapest in 2005.

His biggest achievements in the ATP Tour are reaching the semifinals twice, at the Bucharest Open in 2003, where he lost to Nicolás Massú and at Gstaad in 2005, where he lost to Stanislas Wawrinka.

Sabău got his best ATP Singles Ranking in September 2005, reaching World No. 74. Later that year, he played for the first time at the US Open, but lost in the first round to Andre Agassi.

In 2006, he made his first appearance at the Australian Open and Wimbledon, and his second at the French Open but failed to advance past the first round in any of the three.

2007, by contrast, was a poor year for Sabău. Playing the ATP Challenger Series, he did not advance beyond the second round in singles in any events, losing in the first round fourteen out of eighteen times. In seven tournaments in doubles, he only advanced beyond the first round once.

His poor results the previous year meant Sabău was relegated to the ITF Men's Circuit for 2008. He captured one title, Romania F1 Futures tournament, and reached two other finals. His ranking rose from World No. 630 at the end of 2007 to No. 460 by the end of 2008.

Sabău played far fewer events in 2009 – twenty compared with thirty-one in 2008. He reached two Futures finals but failed to win a single main draw match at Challenger level, in four events played. (The previous year he won just one Challenger main draw match in ten tournaments entered.) Sabău finished 2009 ranked World No. 627 in singles. For the second year in a row he competed in just two tour doubles events, both Futures, reaching the semi-finals in one.

Sabău competed in sixteen events in 2010, all in Romania, Italy, and France, and all but three ITF Futures. He reached one final and four semi-finals, and won a Challenger main draw match for the first time in two seasons. His ranking climbed a hundred spots, to finish the year World No. 527.

Sabău was busier in 2011, competing by early June in more events than he had in all the previous year. All but one were Futures tournaments. He won one title, Bulgaria F3, and lost in the first round just once. His singles ranking climbed to be in the middle 400s.

Sabău then retired in late 2011 despite a few successes. In a nearly two-decades-long career, he just won around $700k as prize money.

== Junior Grand Slam finals ==
=== Singles: 1 (1 title) ===
| Result | Year | Tournament | Surface | Opponent | Score |
|---|---|---|---|---|---|
| Win | 1993 | Wimbledon | Grass | (Venezuela) Jimy Szymanski | 6–1, 6–3 |

== ATP Challenger and ITF Futures finals ==
=== Singles: 25 (9–16) ===
| Legend ATP Challenger (4–6) ITF Futures (5–10) | Finals by surface Hard (1–2) Clay (8–14) Grass (0–0) Carpet (0–0) |

| Result | W–L | Date | Tournament | Tier | Surface | Opponent | Score |
|---|---|---|---|---|---|---|---|
| Loss | 0–1 | Sep 1996 | Brașov, Romania | Challenger | Clay | (Romania) Dinu Pescariu | 6–4, 2–6, 3–6 |
| Win | 1–1 | Sep 1996 | Budapest, Hungary | Challenger | Clay | (Hungary) Attila Sávolt | 6–2, 6–2 |
| Loss | 1–2 | May 1997 | Curitiba, Brazil | Challenger | Clay | (Brazil) Gustavo Kuerten | 6–3, 4–6, 3–6 |
| Loss | 1–3 | Apr 2002 | Mexico F4, Guadalajara | Futures | Clay | (Austria) Andreas Fasching | 2–6 ret. |
| Win | 2–3 | Jul 2002 | Romania F2, Bucharest | Futures | Clay | (Spain) Esteban Carril | 6–1, 6–3 |
| Loss | 2–4 | Nov 2002 | Réunion, Reunion | Challenger | Hard | (Argentina) Federico Browne | 0–6, 6–4, 5–7 |
| Win | 3–4 | Jul 2003 | Romania F5, Cluj-Napoca | Futures | Clay | (France) Thomas Oger | 6–4, 6–1 |
| Loss | 3–5 | Aug 2003 | Romania F8, Bucharest | Futures | Clay | (Romania) Ionuț Moldovan | 4–6, 4–6 |
| Win | 4–5 | Aug 2003 | Romania F9, Bucharest | Futures | Clay | (France) Nicolas Renavand | 6–3, 6–0 |
| Loss | 4–6 | Aug 2003 | Romania F10, Brașov | Futures | Clay | (Romania) Gabriel Moraru | 4–6, 7–5, 1–3 ret. |
| Loss | 4–7 | Sep 2003 | Brașov, Romania | Challenger | Clay | (Germany) Daniel Elsner | 2–6, 1–6 |
| Loss | 4–8 | Oct 2004 | Quito, Ecuador | Challenger | Clay | (Ecuador) Giovanni Lapentti | 4–6, 3–6 |
| Win | 5–8 | Nov 2004 | Homestead, United States | Challenger | Hard | (South Africa) Wesley Moodie | 5–7, 6–2, 7–5 |
| Loss | 5–9 | Nov 2004 | Puebla, Mexico | Challenger | Hard | (Mexico) Miguel Gallardo Valles | 6–7^{(5–7)}, 4–6 |
| Win | 6–9 | May 2005 | Budapest, Hungary | Challenger | Clay | (Switzerland) Jean-Claude Scherrer | 1–6, 7–6^{(7–3)}, 6–3 |
| Win | 7–9 | Jun 2005 | Košice, Slovakia | Challenger | Clay | (Poland) Adam Chadaj | 6–1, 6–2 |
| Win | 8–9 | May 2008 | Romania F1, Bucharest | Futures | Clay | (Australia) John Millman | 7–5, 6–3 |
| Loss | 8–10 | May 2008 | Romania F3, Pitești | Futures | Clay | (Romania) Victor Ioniță | walkover |
| Loss | 8–11 | Aug 2008 | Romania F18, Brașov | Futures | Clay | (Romania) Victor Ioniță | 4–6, 3–6 |
| Loss | 8–12 | Jun 2009 | Romania F5, Bacău | Futures | Clay | (Switzerland) Alexander Sadecky | 1–6, 1–0 ret. |
| Loss | 8–13 | Jul 2009 | Romania F8, Mediaș | Futures | Clay | (Romania) Victor Ioniță | 6–0, 4–6, 5–7 |
| Loss | 8–14 | Jul 2010 | Romania F6, Cluj-Napoca | Futures | Clay | (Spain) Javier Martí | 6–7^{(5–7)}, 7–5, 1–6 |
| Win | 9–14 | May 2011 | Bulgaria F3, Sofia | Futures | Clay | (Italy) Enrico Burzi | 6–2, 6–3 |
| Loss | 9–15 | Sep 2011 | Romania F9, Brașov | Futures | Clay | (Romania) Teodor-Dacian Craciun | 4–6, 6–1, 3–6 |
| Loss | 9–16 | Oct 2011 | Italy F29, Frascati | Futures | Clay | (France) Axel Michon | 2–6, 1–6 |

=== Doubles: 2 (0–2) ===
| Legend ATP Challenger (0–2) ITF Futures (0–0) | Finals by surface Hard (0–1) Clay (0–1) Grass (0–0) Carpet (0–0) |

| Result | W–L | Date | Tournament | Tier | Surface | Partner | Opponents | Score |
|---|---|---|---|---|---|---|---|---|
| Loss | 0–1 | Oct 2004 | Grenoble, France | Challenger | Hard | (Germany) Michael Berrer | (Italy) Uros Vico (Croatia) Lovro Zovko | 2–6, 4–6 |
| Loss | 0–2 | Apr 2005 | Rome, Italy | Challenger | Clay | (Romania) Victor Ioniță | (Italy) Manuel Jorquera (Russia) Dmitry Tursunov | 6–1, 6–7^{(4–7)}, 4–6 |

== Performance timelines ==
Key
| W | F | SF | QF | #R | RR | Q# | DNQ | A | NH |

(W) winner; (F) finalist; (SF) semifinalist; (QF) quarterfinalist; (#R) rounds 4, 3, 2, 1; (RR) round-robin stage; (Q#) qualification round; (DNQ) did not qualify; (A) absent; (NH) not held; (SR) strike rate (events won / competed); (W–L) win–loss record.

=== Singles ===
| Tournament | 1996 | 1997 | 1998 | 1999 | 2000 | 2001 | 2002 | 2003 | 2004 | 2005 | 2006 | 2007 | SR | W–L | Win % |
|---|---|---|---|---|---|---|---|---|---|---|---|---|---|---|---|
Grand Slam tournaments
| Australian Open | Q1 | Q2 | Q1 | A | Q1 | Q3 | A | Q2 | Q1 | Q1 | 1R | A | 0 / 1 | 0–1 | 0% |
| French Open | A | Q1 | Q3 | 1R | Q2 | A | Q1 | A | Q1 | A | 1R | Q1 | 0 / 2 | 0–2 | 0% |
| Wimbledon | A | A | A | Q2 | Q1 | A | Q1 | A | Q1 | A | 1R | Q1 | 0 / 1 | 0–1 | 0% |
| US Open | A | Q1 | Q1 | A | Q1 | Q1 | Q1 | A | Q2 | 1R | Q2 | A | 0 / 1 | 0–1 | 0% |
| Win–loss | 0–0 | 0–0 | 0–0 | 0–1 | 0–0 | 0–0 | 0–0 | 0–0 | 0–0 | 0–1 | 0–3 | 0–0 | 0 / 5 | 0–5 | 0% |
ATP Tour Masters 1000
| Indian Wells | A | A | A | A | A | A | A | A | Q2 | A | A | A | 0 / 0 | 0–0 | – |
| Miami Open | A | Q2 | A | A | A | A | A | A | Q2 | Q1 | Q1 | A | 0 / 0 | 0–0 | – |
| Monte Carlo | A | A | Q1 | A | A | A | A | A | A | A | A | A | 0 / 0 | 0–0 | – |
| Rome | Q2 | A | Q1 | A | A | A | A | A | A | Q1 | Q1 | A | 0 / 0 | 0–0 | – |
| Madrid | Not Held | | | | | | A | A | A | Q2 | A | A | 0 / 0 | 0–0 | – |
| Hamburg | A | A | A | A | A | A | A | A | Q1 | A | Q2 | A | 0 / 0 | 0–0 | – |
| Cincinnati | A | A | A | A | Q2 | A | A | A | A | A | A | A | 0 / 0 | 0–0 | – |
| Paris Masters | Q2 | A | A | A | A | A | A | A | A | Q1 | A | A | 0 / 0 | 0–0 | – |
| Win–loss | 0–0 | 0–0 | 0–0 | 0–0 | 0–0 | 0–0 | 0–0 | 0–0 | 0–0 | 0–0 | 0–0 | 0–0 | 0 / 0 | 0–0 | – |

== Coaching career and personal life ==
Sabău started his coaching career in 2010, and he met his trainee Patricia Maria Țig when she began coming to his academy for training around 2015. However, as time passed, the two began liking each other and eventually started dating. Born in 1994, Tig is 17 years younger than Sabău. Under his guidance, Tig made tremendous progress despite recurring injuries, which forced her out of the court once for nearly two years in the late 2010s. Tig achieved a career-high WTA singles ranking of No. 56 on 26 October 2020.

They had a daughter named Sofia in November 2018. Sabău and Tig were not married at the time of their daughter’s birth, but they eventually did. The couple ended their relationship in 2021. Although Sabău had initially taken Sofia with him, Tig later won custody of her daughter. Sabău left coaching tennis following this separation from Tig and began living in Cyprus, where he began to play professional poker, in which he was at one point the 96th Romanian in the computerized hierarchy of poker earnings with an income of 142,886 dollars. Owner of a house in the north-eastern part of Cyprus, Sabău earned a living, as does fellow former No. 1 Evgheny Kafelnikov from poker in luxury casinos open in Limassol, Ayia Napa, Karavas, or Kyrenia.

== Endorsements ==
Sabău was the first Romanian after Ilie Năstase to sign a contract with Nike, in a transaction that was brokered by International Management Group, the largest sports management and marketing company in the world.
