= Tennis Europe Junior Tour =

European Junior tennis tour for men

The Tennis Europe Junior Tour is the European tennis tour for players who are in the age range recognized by Tennis Europe as junior athletes. The Tour was organized by the European Tennis Association (ETA), now known as Tennis Europe.

The Tennis Europe Junior Tour is now universally recognized as the first stepping stone for talented young players across Europe as they transition from domestic to international events. Several future world No. 1 displayed their talents to an international audience for the first time on the European Junior Tour, including Steffi Graf, Monica Seles, Amélie Mauresmo, Boris Becker, Stefan Edberg, Ivan Lendl, Marat Safin, and Mats Wilander.

== History ==
With the emergence of the ATP Tour in 1990, the Tennis Europe Junior Tour was also created. Founded in 1990 with 43 tournaments over two age groups, the Junior Tour has since grown and been divided into three age groups; 16 & Under, 14 & Under and 12 & Under, and as of 2022, these three categories combined for a total of some 450+ tournaments, staged across almost all 50 member nations of Tennis Europe, and with the participation of over 12,000 players, including non-European players, such as Lleyton Hewitt, Kei Nishikori, Juan Martín Del Potro, Guillermo Coria, and Sania Mirza, who all got their first taste of European competition on the Junior Tour.

== Overview ==
After playing national junior events in their home countries, talented young players then usually proceed to compete internationally, on the Tennis Europe Junior Tour. Players begin their pathway with Category 3 events and work their way up to competing at the U14 Super Category tournaments (dubbed as the 'grand slams' of the U14 circuit), the European Championships, and the season-ending Junior Masters. The Tennis Europe Junior Tour also boasts a cumulative weekly ranking, 'Player of the Year' awards (former recipients include Rafael Nadal, Grigor Dimitrov, and Kim Clijsters), and a season-ending Masters tournament for the top eight performers in each category (the equivalent of the ATP Finals).

The best players from the Junior Tour then join the ITF Junior Circuit, which allows them to compete for the Junior Grand Slam titles, establish a world junior ranking and give them a chance to get an ATP or WTA ranking. The ITF Junior Circuit is thus basically the player pathway between the junior game of the Tennis Europe Junior Tour and the elite levels of professional tennis of the ATP.

Two team events also exist for the top players from each age category (U12/U14/U16): The Tennis Europe Winter Cups and the Summer Cups, which provide youngsters with an early opportunity to compete for their countries. These events are where many future Davis and Billie Jean King Cup champions earned a first taste of team competition. The U14 events serve as the European qualifying for the ITF World Junior Tennis tournament, while the U16 events are the European qualifying for the Junior Davis Cup and Junior Billie Jean King Cup. All three of them date back to the founding of Tennis Europe in the mid-1970s.

== Tournament grades ==
=== U12 Circuit ===
The 12 & Under Tour differs in that no rankings are produced, and there are no Masters or European individual championship events, though the summer team event has been widely acclaimed. From 2021, the top U12 players end the season at the 12 & Under Festival, an invitational event for the national squads of European boys and girls hosted by the Rafa Nadal Academy.

=== U14/16 Circuit ===
The 14/16 & Under Tour events are played at three levels, ranging from the elite Category 1 events, which attract the strongest draws, to the more numerous and accessible Category 2 and 3 events. In 2019, Tennis Europe announced the introduction of a new ‘Super Category’ in the Junior Tour events, which would award increased ranking points and provide other increased benefits and services for participants. The Super Category status was awarded to 5 of the Tour’s best-performing and most prestigious events in recognition of their extraordinary performance: The ONE-SGM Christmas Cup held in Khimki, Les Petits As held in Tarbes, Kungens Kanna & Drottningens Pris held in Stockholm, the Taça Internacional Maia held in Maia, and the U14 International German Tennis Championships held in Düren.

Before the addition of the Super Categories, the most important and prestigious tournaments in the U14 Junior Tennis calendar were Petits As, Tim Essonne, the European Junior Championships, and the season-ending Junior Masters. No one has ever won all of them, but Richard Gasquet and Rafael Nadal have both won three of them, with Gasquet only missing the Masters while Nadal only failed to win the Championships. The only players who have won both Petits As and the U14 European Junior Championships are Reinhard Wawra in 1987, Maxime Boyé in 1990, Răzvan Sabău in 1991, Julien Maigret in 1997, Richard Gasquet in 1999, Carlos Boluda in 2006, Nikola Milojević in 2009, Vojtech Petr in 2019, and Thijs Boogaard in 2022. In 1991, the finalists of Petits As, Răzvan Sabău and Juan Antonio Saiz, also reached the final of the U14 European Junior Championships, with Sabău winning both of them. Furthermore, Todor Enev reached both finals in 1996, but lost both of them.

In the U14/16 Circuits, boys and girls events in both singles and doubles events are held at all tournaments, with some offering additional consolation tournaments for early losers. In addition to their results, some juniors are more focused on player parties, cultural exchanges, and tourist trips during the events.

== See also ==
- ATP Tour
- ATP Challenger Tour
- ITF Men's World Tennis Tour
- ITF Junior Circuit
- WTA Tour
