= World Tennis Tour Junior Finals =

International tennis tournament

The World Tennis Tour Junior Finals is a year-end singles tournament for the top-ranked 18-and-under tennis players on the World Tennis Tour Juniors. It is the second most prestigious annual junior event in terms of rankings points awarded, after the four junior grand slams. Each year, eight boys and eight girls participate in separate events. The tournament is designed to emulate the ATP Finals and WTA Finals. Each event features two round-robin groups vying for spots in the knockout rounds that determine the champion.

It is played outdoor on hard surface since first edition. The 2024 edition was played from 16 to 20 October.

== History ==
The ITF Junior Finals was founded in 2015, and has been held in Chengdu, China each year. The first two editions were held as exhibitions. 2017 edition of the competition was the first to be held at the end of the year. The ITF began awarding rankings points to participants in 2017, and the current points system started in 2018.

== Format ==
In 2015 and 2016 it was a knockout tournament (QF-SF-F). Losers played placement matches: 3rd place play-off and 5th to 8th play-off.

In 2017 format was changed. The boys' and girls' events each consist of two round-robin groups of four players. The top two finishers in each group qualify for the championship knockout bracket. The bottom two finishers qualify for the 5th–8th place knockout bracket. In each bracket, one of the higher-ranked finishers from the round-robin stage plays the lower-ranked finisher from the opposite group. The winners of the first knockout matches in the championship bracket play for the title, while the winners of the first knockout matches in the 5th–8th place bracket play for 5th place. There are also 3rd-place and 7th-place matches for the losers of the first knockout matches. These final matches all award ITF junior rankings points to the winners as follows:

Final Position	1st	2nd	3rd	4th	5th	6th	7th	8th
Points	750	450	320	220	165	145	125	105

== Qualification ==
The top seven boys and girls in the ITF junior rankings automatically qualify for the tournament. The final slot in each event is reserved for the top ranked Chinese junior, provided they are ranked inside the Top 25. If there is no such player or if there already is a Chinese player who qualified in one of the top seven positions, the last spot goes to the eighth ranked player. The date for the rankings that are used is immediately after the conclusion of the US Open in September. Thus, these rankings incorporate results from all tournaments since, but not including the previous year's US Open. Additionally, the players must not turn 19 until the January following the tournament to be eligible (i.e. the 2018 event is for players born in 2000 or later).

== Prize money ==
There is no prize money for the players, given that they are still juniors. However, there are travel grants for participation in the tournament that are awarded based on a player's performance in the event. These range from $7,000 to $15,000.

== List of finals and participants ==
=== Boys ===
Year	Champion	Runner-up	Score
2026	(United States) Jordan Lee	(Slovenia) Žiga Šeško	6–3, 7–5
2025	(Germany) Max Schönhaus	(Romania) Yannick Theodor Alexandrescou	6–2, 6–0
2024	(Netherlands) Mees Röttgering	(Spain) Rafael Jódar	6–4, 7–6^{(7–2)}
2023	(Austria) Joel Schwärzler	(Mexico) Rodrigo Pacheco Méndez	6–3, 7–6^{(8–6)}
2022	Cancelled		
2021	Cancelled		
2020	Cancelled		
2019	(Denmark) Holger Rune	(France) Harold Mayot	7–6^{(7–3)}, 4–6, 6–2
2018	(United States) Brandon Nakashima	(Chinese Taipei) Tseng Chun-hsin	6–2, 6–1
2017	(Finland) Emil Ruusuvuori	(China) Wu Yibing	3–6, 6–1, 7–6^{(7–4)}
2016	(South Korea) Hong Seong-chan	(Norway) Casper Ruud	7–5, 6–3
2015	(Russia) Andrey Rublev	(United States) Taylor Fritz	6–7^{(2–7)}, 6–3, 6–4

=== Girls ===
Year	Champion	Runner-up	Score
2026	(China) Sun Xinran	Anna Pushkareva	6–3, 6–7^{(4–7)}, 6–1
2025	(Belgium) Jeline Vandromme	(United States) Kristina Penickova	4–6, 7–6^{(7–5)}, 7–5
2024	(Australia) Emerson Jones	(Czech Republic) Laura Samson	6–4, 6–4
2023	Alina Korneeva	(Japan) Sara Saito	6–0, 6–3
2022	Cancelled		
2021	Cancelled		
2020	Cancelled		
2019	(France) Diane Parry	(Ukraine) Daria Snigur	6–1, 6–4
2018	(France) Clara Burel	(Colombia) Camila Osorio	7–6^{(8–6)}, 6–1
2017	(Ukraine) Marta Kostyuk	(Slovenia) Kaja Juvan	6–4, 6–3
2016	(Russia) Anna Blinkova	(United Kingdom) Katie Swan	6–4, 6–7^{(1–7)}, 7–6^{(7–4)}
2015	(China) Xu Shilin	(Slovakia) Kristína Schmiedlová	6–4, 6–2
