= Reinhard Wawra =

Austrian professional tennis player

- Country (sports): Austria
- Born: 7 February 1973 (age 52)
- Prize money: $13,829

Singles
- Career record: 0–2
- Highest ranking: No. 293 (12 Jun 1995)

Grand Slam singles results
- Australian Open: Q1 (1991)

Doubles
- Career record: 0–3
- Highest ranking: No. 456 (11 Nov 1996)

Reinhard Wawra (born 7 February 1973) is an Austrian former professional tennis player. Reached a career-high singles ranking of World No. 293 on 12 June 1995.

== Career ==
As a junior, Wawra was a standout player who won several youth tournaments. In 1986, he was part of the Austrian team that dominated and won the Lacoste Nations Cup, an Under-14 team tournament held in Germany. The following year, Wawra excelled on the U14 circuit of the Tennis Europe Junior Tour, winning the prestigious trophies of the year at Petits As and the European Junior Championships at San Remo. In 1989, at the Orange Bowl for the Under 16 category in Miami, Wawra was defeated by qualifier Juan Garat, 6–2, 4–6, 7-6^{(8–6)}.

On the professional tour, Wawra made ATP Tour singles main draw appearances at the Vienna Open in 1990 and Austrian Open Kitzbühel in 1991. He participated in the qualifying rounds of the 1991 Australian Open, was a finalist at the 1992 Vienna Challenger and achieved his career high singles ranking of 293 during the 1995 season.
