= Yannick Theodor Alexandrescou =

Romanian-French tennis player (born 2008)

- Country (sports): France (2025–present); Romania (2023–2025)
- Born: 10 January 2008 (age 18) Vienna, Austria
- Height: 1.70 m (5 ft 7 in)
- Plays: Right-handed (two-handed backhand)
- College: Duke University
- Coach: Eldar-Sebastian Rosianu
- Prize money: US $14,023

Singles
- Career record: 0-0
- Career titles: 0
- Highest ranking: No. 786 (14 September 2026)
- Current ranking: No. 786 (14 September 2026)

Grand Slam singles results
- Australian Open Junior: 2R (2025)
- French Open Junior: QF (2025)
- Wimbledon Junior: 2R (2025)
- US Open Junior: 2R (2026)

Doubles
- Career record: 0-0
- Career titles: 0
- Highest ranking: No. 1,348 (3 August 2026)
- Current ranking: No. 1,353 (14 September 2026)

Grand Slam doubles results
- Australian Open Junior: 2R (2026)
- French Open Junior: QF (2025)
- Wimbledon Junior: QF (2026)
- US Open Junior: 2R (2026)
- Last updated on: 14 September 2026.

Yannick Theodor Alexandrescou (also spelled Alexandrescu; born 10 January 2008) is a Romanian-French tennis player. He has a career-high ITF junior combined ranking of No. 2 achieved on 5 January 2026. Alexandrescou also has a career-high ATP singles ranking of world No. 786 achieved on 14 September 2026 and a doubles ranking of world No. 1,348 achieved on 3 August 2026.

== Personal life ==
Alexandrescou was born in Vienna to Miki Alexandrescou, who was a Formula 1 commentator. He was named after Yannick Noah, whom his father was friends with. His father, who was a fan of tennis introduced Yannick to tennis. In 2020, during a U12 international tournament in Auray, Brittany that Alexandrescou was playing, his father suffered a heart attack and later died.

In December 2025, chose to represent France instead of Romania.

== Junior career ==
In September 2024, Alexandrescou won the U16 European Junior Championships, defeating Tito Chávez in the final. The following month, he also won the U16 Tennis Europe Junior Masters in Monte Carlo, defeating Mark Becirovic Novak in the final. In November, he represented Romania at the Junior Davis Cup with Alejandro Mateo Berge Nourescu and Cezar Stefan Bentzel; they finished runners-up to the United States.

In June 2025, he reached the boys' singles quarterfinals of the French Open. In October that year, he made it to the final of the ITF Junior Finals in Chengdu, defeating Alexander Vasilev, Oskari Paldanius and Andrés Santamarta Roig, before losing to Max Schönhaus.

Alexandrescou entered the 2026 Australian Open – Boys' singles as the top seed, but lost to Matei Todoran in the first round.

== Professional career ==
In May 2026, Alexandrescou made it to the quarterfinal of the Zagreb Open after a withdrawal from Thanasi Kokkinakis and a win against August Holmgren. In August, he made it to another quarterfinal at the Plovdiv Challenger II, where he defeated Hernán Casanova and Petr Brunclík.

Alexandrescou signed onto the Duke Blue Devils team for college tennis, starting with the 2026–2027 season.

== ITF World Tennis Tour finals ==
=== Doubles: 1 (1 title) ===
Finals by surface
Hard (0–0)
Clay (1–0)
Grass (0–0)

Result	W–L	Date	Tournament	Tier	Surface	Partner	Opponents	Score
Win	1–0	Apr 2026	M15 Oegstgeest, Netherlands	WTT	Clay	(Netherlands) Pieter de Lange	(Netherlands) Edward Etty (Germany) Cedric Stanke	6–4, 6–0
