= Tim Essonne =

French junior tennis tournament

The Tim Essonne is an international junior tennis tournament for players aged 12–14, held in Sainte-Geneviève-des-Bois. It is one of the most prestigious trophies in the U14 circuit of the Tennis Europe Junior Tour.

The event has seen a number of its champions go on to become professionals, such as Richard Gasquet and Rafael Nadal who won the tournament in 1998 and 1999 respectively. Other notable participations were Roger Federer in 1994 and Stefanos Tsitsipas in 2012. Future World No. 1s Martina Hingis, Amélie Mauresmo, and Justine Henin also participated.

== History ==
The tournament was created in 1983, at the request of Jean-Paul Loth (then national technical director) and Albert Guilbert (president of the Ligue de l'Essonne).

The competition has been classified as a grade 1 of the Tennis Europe Junior Tour, a rank it has held since its creation in 1983 thanks to the accommodation and catering offered to participants and coaches. As a grade 1 tournament, Tim Essonne has a lot of points to offer in the U14 Junior Rankings; for instance, in 2017, Max Westphal from Esson went from 77th to 6th place in Europe after reaching the final.

The tournament was initially called simply Tim, then Tim 91, and finally renamed Tim Essonne. Its success has continued to grow since its creation. In 35 years, the number of participating nations has increased from 5 to nearly 50.

== Singles Champions ==
Boys' and Girls Results
Year	Boys	Girls
1983	(France) Arnaud Boetsch	(France) Cécile Bourdais
1984	(France) Guillaume Raoux	(France) Emmanuelle Derly
1986	(France) Pierre-Olivier Citton	(Netherlands) Linda Niemantsverdriet
1987	(Belgium) Bart De Buyser	(Hungary) Anna Földényi
1988	(Czechoslovakia) Filip Kaščák	(Netherlands) Lara Bitter
1989	(Austria) Robert Witz	(France) Anne Pastor
1990	(France) Johann Potron	(Hungary) Rita Kuti-Kis
1991	(Sweden) Björn Rehnquist	(Switzerland) Martina Hingis
1992	(Germany) Daniel Elsner	(France) Corinne Dauve
1993	(Poland) Filip Anioła	(Hungary) Zsófia Gubacsi
1994	(Slovenia) Gasper Martinjak	(Russia) Elena Dementieva
1995	(Spain) Tommy Robredo	(Croatia) Jelena Pandžić
1996	(France) Mickael Ali-Cayo	(Slovakia) Martina Babáková
1997	(Austria) Stefan Wiespeiner	(Switzerland) Marie-Gaïané Mikaelian
1998	(France) Richard Gasquet	(Croatia) Matea Mezak
1999	(Spain) Rafael Nadal	(Romania) Alexandra Orăşanu
2000	(Russia) Alexandre Krasnoroutskiy	(Bulgaria) Tsvetana Pironkova
2001	(Latvia) Kārlis Lejnieks	(Russia) Ekaterina Kosminskaya
2002	(France) Kevin Botti	(Russia) Evgeniya Rodina
2003	(Belarus) Uladzimir Ignatik	(Russia) Elena Kulikova
2004	(Belgium) Yannik Reuter	(Croatia) Petra Martić
2005	(Russia) Mikhail Biryukov	(Russia) Yana Buchina
2006	(Spain) Carlos Boluda-Purkiss	(Russia) Daria Gavrilova
2007	(Russia) Evgeny Karlovskiy	(Russia) Daria Gavrilova
2008	(France) Julien Delaplane	(Slovakia) Petra Uberalová
2009	(France) Thomas Brechemier	(France) Estelle Cascino
2020	Cancelled	
2011	(Russia) Andrey Rublev	(Greece) Valentini Grammatikopoulou
2012	(Estonia) Kenneth Raisma	(Ukraine) Olga Fridman
2013	(France) Corentin Moutet	(Czech Republic) Markéta Vondroušová
2014	(Germany) Rudolf Molleker	(Russia) Olesya Pervushina
2015	(Bulgaria) Adrian Andreev	(Russia) Taisiya Pachkaleva
2016	(France) Lilian Marmousez	(China) Zheng Qinwen
2017	(Switzerland) Jérôme Kym	(Russia) Maria Bondarenko
2018	(France) Sean Cuenin	(Czech Republic) Linda Nosková
2019	(Belgium) Gilles-Arnaud Bailly	(Serbia) Tijana Sretenović
2020	(France) Théo Papamalamis	(France) Shanice Roignot
2020	Cancelled	
2022	(Kazakhstan) Zangar Nurlanuly	(France) Ksenia Efremova
2023	Alexey Frolov	(France) Ksenia Efremova
2024	(United Kingdom) Eric Lorimer	(China) Sun Xinran
2025	(Greece) Rafael Pagonis	(Sweden) Grace Bernstein
2026	Rafael Papoian	Lyubov Pronenko

== Doubles champions ==
Year	Boys	Girls
2011	(Romania) Bogdan Borza (Romania) Nicolae Frunză	(Czech Republic) Miriam Kolodziejova (Czech Republic) Vendula Žovincová
2012	(Canada) Dylan Bednarczyk (Estonia) Kenneth Raisma	(Czech Republic) Barbora Miklová (Czech Republic) Markéta Vondroušová
2013	(Russia) Artem Dubrivnyy (Poland) Kacper Żuk	(Czech Republic) Anna Slováková (Czech Republic) Markéta Vondroušová
2014	(France) Dorian Bahloul (France) Youlian Iakovlev	(United Kingdom) Francesca Jones (Egypt) Dalila Said
2015	(France) Raphael Bonnet Flores (France) Allan Deschamps	(Russia) Taisiya Pachkaleva (Russia) Anastasia Tikhonova
2016	(Switzerland) Jean Marc Malkowski (Estonia) Alexander Georg Mandma	(Czech Republic) Denisa Hindová (Czech Republic) Tereza Vajsejtlová
2017	(The Bahamas) Jacobi Bain (France) Max Westphal	(Russia) Maria Bondarenko (Russia) Milana Zhabrailova
2018	(France) Sean Cuenin (France) William Jucha	(Czech Republic) Linda Fruhvirtová (Czech Republic) Linda Nosková
2019	(Russia) Yaroslav Demin (Russia) Grigory Shebekin	(Russia) Valery Gynina (Poland) Malwina Rowińska
2020	(Switzerland) Sam Pidoux (Switzerland) Janis Raffael Simmen	(United Kingdom) Hephzibah Oluwadare (United Kingdom) Hannah Read
2021	Cancelled	
2022	(Ecuador) Tito Chávez (Spain) Eudald González	(France) Ksenia Efremova; Mariia Makarova
2023	(Czech Republic) Filip Ladman; Savva Rybkin	(Brazil) Victoria Luiza Barros (Ukraine) Sofia Kryvoruchko
2024	Alexey Ilin; Tsikhan Koran	(Bosnia and Herzegovina) Tea Kovačević (China) Sun Xinran
2025	(Hungary) Vencel Fazekas (Kazakhstan) Akhmadi Makhanov	(Sweden) Grace Bernstein (United Kingdom) Milica Sakamoto Milojevic
2026	(Cyprus) Anastasis Mosaikos (Finland) Adam Napari	(Czech Republic) Nicole Kurýlová (Czech Republic) Kristýna Nikodýmová

== Other notable participations ==
Other notable players
Year	Participant	Nationality	Round
1990	Iva Majoli	Croatia	Semifinals
1992	Amélie Mauresmo	France	Quarterfinals
1994	Justine Henin	Belgium	Semifinals
1995	Nicolas Mahut	France	Second round
1995	Marta Marrero	Spain	Round of 16
1997	Gilles Simon	France	Quarterfinals
1998	Tomáš Berdych	Czech Republic	Second round
1999	Gaël Monfils	France	Round of 16
2001	Adrian Mannarino	France	Semifinals
2004	Pierre-Hugues Herbert	France	Second round
2004	Grigor Dimitrov	Bulgaria	Second round
2004	Simona Halep	Romania	Round of 16
2006	Garbiñe Muguruza	Spain	Second round
2007	Annika Beck	Germany	Round of 16
2009	Daniil Medvedev	Russia	Quarterfinals
2012	Stefanos Tsitsipas	Greece	Second round

== Organization ==
The Tim Essonne sponsors and long-standing institutional partners include: The French Tennis Federation, the General Council of Essonne, the Departmental Youth and Sports Directorate, the commune of Sainte-Geneviève-des-Bois. The tournament relies on volunteers to support its operations.
