= Tennis Europe =

Regional federation of national tennis organizations in Europe

- Formation: 1975; 51 years ago
- Headquarters: Zur Gempenfluh 36, Basel CH 4059, Switzerland
- Location: Basel, Switzerland
- Members: 50 national associations
- Website: www.tenniseurope.org

Tennis Europe (formerly known as the European Tennis Association) was formed in Rome, Italy on 31 May 1975 by a group of 17 European national tennis federations as a regional governing body for the sport of tennis and under the auspices of World Tennis. It is the world's largest regional association of World Tennis, with 50 member states in 2015.

Based in Basel, Switzerland, the organisation takes an active role in all aspects of the European game, executing tasks delegated by World Tennis, and also by organizing a number of competitions and events independently from World Tennis, such as European Tennis Championships.

Francesco Ricci Bitti was President of Tennis Europe from 1993 to 1999.

Henrik Thorsøe Pedersen was elected as president until 2028 at elections in March 2024.

In reaction to the 2022 Russian invasion of Ukraine, Tennis Europe suspended from membership both the Russian Tennis Federation and the Belarus Tennis Federation. Teams representing Russia and Belarus were therefore ineligible to compete at all Tennis Europe events (including Winter & Summer Cups, European Beach Tennis, and Senior Club Championships). All Tennis Europe events in Russia and Belarus were suspended, including the European Junior Tennis Championships (16 & Under) in Moscow, and delegates from both countries were not eligible to attend the 2022 Annual General Meeting of Tennis Europe.

== Events ==
Tennis Europe supports, manages, and sanctions over 1,200 international tennis events across the continent each year:

European Tennis Championships

Junior events
Tennis Europe Junior Tour (Around 500 individual events for players aged 16/14/12 & Under)
These include some of the sport's best-known and most prestigious tournaments for players of these age groups, including Les Petits As (FRA) and Avvenire (ITA).

European Junior Tennis Championships (18/16/14 & Under)
Tennis Europe Summer Cups (18/16/14 & Under)
Tennis Europe Summer Cups by Dunlop (12 & Under)
Tennis Europe Winter Cups by Dunlop (16/14 & Under)
Tennis Europe Junior Masters (16/14 & Under)
ITF/Tennis Europe Development Championships (14 & Under)
12 & Under Festival

Senior Tennis events
European Masters Championships (all official age categories)
European Masters Clubs Championships (Men 35/40/45/55/60/65/70 Women 40/50/60)

European Masters Championships and European Masters Club Championships

European Beach Tennis Championships

Various
Tennis Europe cooperates with World Tennis in the establishment the World Tennis Tour Juniors Calendar (18 & Under) and in the organisation of the European Beach Tennis Championships.

== Results ==
1. European Junior Championships 14 & Under : Since 1976
2. European Junior Championships 16 & Under : Since 1976
3. European Junior Championships 18 & Under : Since 1976
4. Rankings and Tournaments: Since 2009
5. European Masters Championships
6. European Beach Championships: Since 2008
7. European Senior Championships: Since 2012
