= World Tennis Tour Juniors =

Premier level worldwide competition for under-18 junior tennis players

The World Tennis Tour Juniors is the premier level for worldwide competition among under-18 junior tennis players, organized by the World Tennis. Founded in 1977 with only nine tournaments, the 2011 World Tennis Tour Juniors offered over 350 tournaments in 118 countries. Mirroring the ATP and WTA tours, the World Tennis Tour Juniors ranks players and crowns a year-end world champion.

== History ==
The World Tennis Tour Juniors is organized by World Tennis. Since its creation it has been the beginning of many successful careers. Some junior world champions that have gone on to achieve great success on the pro tour include Ivan Lendl, Pat Cash, Gabriela Sabatini, Martina Hingis, Marcelo Ríos, Andy Roddick, Amélie Mauresmo, Roger Federer, and many more. From 1982 through 2003, the ITF Junior Circuit recognized year-end champions in singles and doubles. Beginning in 2004, the rankings were combined and a single champion in both boys' and girls' competition was recognized.

== Tournament grades ==
Just like the ATP and WTA, junior tournaments are divided into different levels. The highest level tournaments are the junior grand slams and the Youth Olympics, followed by the WTT Junior Finals, an event that resembles the year-end finals. The five Grade A tournaments are the junior equivalent of the ATP Masters 1000 and WTA Premier Mandatory events in terms of points awarded relative to the grand slams. In calendar order, these are the Copa Gerdau, the Trofeo Bonfiglio, the Osaka Mayor's Cup, the Abierto Juvenil Mexicano, and the Orange Bowl. All remaining tournaments are assigned Grades 1 through 5. Tournaments labeled B1 through B3 refer to regional tournaments.

The ITF mostly recently changed the points system in 2018. The new system is designed to give the higher-level Grade A and Grade 1 tournaments more weight, and to reward players who progress deeper into tournaments regardless of the level. It also elevated the junior majors, the Youth Olympics, and the Junior Finals above the Grade A level, which was previously the highest tier. Lastly, Grade B tournaments now award the same points as their non-regional counterparts with the same grade number instead of a slightly higher amount like they did before.

The ITF rankings system combines both singles and doubles results. However, doubles results are underweighted by a factor of one-fourth. Additionally, only the best six results in singles and the best six results in doubles count towards a player's ranking. The point distribution for each level of tournament is as follows:

Singles points distribution (2020–present)
| Event | W | F | SF | QF | R16 | R32 |
| Grand Slam | 1000 | 700 | 490 | 300 | 180 | 90 |
| Youth Olympics | 1000 | 700 | 490 | 300 | 180 | 90 |
| Junior Finals | 750 | 450 | 250+ | 150+ | - | - |
| J500 | 500 | 350 | 250 | 150 | 90 | 45 |
| J300 | 300 | 210 | 140 | 100 | 60 | 30 |
| J200 | 200 | 140 | 100 | 60 | 36 | 18 |
| J100 | 100 | 60 | 36 | 20 | 10 | 5 |
| J60 | 60 | 36 | 18 | 10 | 5 | - |
| J30 | 30 | 18 | 9 | 5 | 2 | - |

Note: The World Tennis Tour Junior Finals awards 320, 250 for 3rd–4th place, and 200, 185, 165, 150 for 5th–8th place.

Doubles points distribution (2020–present)
| Event | W | F | SF | QF | R16 |
| Grand Slam | 750 | 525 | 367 | 225 | 135 |
| Youth Olympics | 750 | 525 | 367 | 225 | 135 |
| J500 | 375 | 262 | 187 | 112 | 67 |
| J300 | 225 | 157 | 105 | 75 | 45 |
| J200 | 150 | 105 | 75 | 45 | 27 |
| J100 | 75 | 45 | 27 | 15 | 7 |
| J60 | 45 | 27 | 14 | 7 | - |
| J30 | 25 | 13 | 6 | 3 | - |

== Junior exempt project ==
In 1997, World Tennis began the junior exempt project to help the world's top junior girls to transition to the professional level. The junior exempt project provides wildcards into the Women's World Tennis Tour events to the girls who ended the year in the top 10 of the world rankings. The number and tournament level of wildcards received depends on how high a player finishes in the top 10. Beginning with the 2007 season, the junior exempt project expanded to include the top 10 boys, who receive wild cards into Futures events.

Since 2018, World Tennis Tour (former Futures) $15,000 tournaments reserve places in the main draw for top players in the World Tennis Tour Juniors.

== Tournaments ==
- Abierto Juvenil Mexicano
- Copa del Cafe
- ITF Junior Masters
- Osaka Mayor's Cup
- Porto Alegre Junior Championships
- Traralgon Tennis International
- Tim Essonne
- Trofeo Bonfiglio
- Petits As
- Junior Davis Cup and Junior Billie Jean King Cup
- es:Copa Mundial de Tenis Juvenil (U14)
