= Petits As =

French junior tennis tournament

Les Petits As – Le Mondial Lacoste (English: Little champions – The Lacoste world championship) is a junior tennis tournament for players aged 12–14, held in Tarbes, France. This tournament is one of the six Super Category tournaments in the U14 circuit of the Tennis Europe Junior Tour, and it is universally recognized as the world's leading indoor U14 competition. The tournament is traditionally held at the end of January, although the 2020 and 2021 editions had to take place in September due to the COVID-19 pandemic.

The event has seen a number of its champions go on to become Grand Slam winners later on, including Rafael Nadal, Michael Chang, Martina Hingis, Kim Clijsters, Juan Carlos Ferrero, Jeļena Ostapenko and Bianca Andreescu. Due to the relatively restrictive age range, few players have won the title more than once, although Hingis and Timea Bacsinszky have both done so. Most recently, Spanish player Carlos Boluda became the first boy to do so.

== Format ==
The tournament is played on indoor GreenSet (hard) courts. Roughly 7,000 players enter the pre-qualifying tournaments held across France, with that number being narrowed down to 350 for the final qualifying stage, and 64 for the final tournament. This event welcomes 45 000 visitors each year in Tarbes and garners over 125 000 live-stream viewers across 151 countries yearly. The event is regulated by the International Tennis Federation (ITF) and has businesses such as Head, Eurosport, Coca-Cola, and Peugeot amongst its portfolio of partners.

Notably, Novak Djokovic and Andy Murray faced each other for the very first time in the quarterfinals of the 2001 edition, which was won by Murray 6–0 6–1. In the 2017 edition, the 13-year-old Carlos Alcaraz and Holger Rune played together in the doubles competition. In 1994, future No. 1 Juan Carlos Ferrero produced one of the competition's most unexpected triumphs when he won the tournament without a ranking.

== Results ==
=== Boys' singles ===
Year	Champion	Runner-up	Score
1983	(France) Jean-Baptiste Bollée	(Spain) Juan Manuel Naves	
1984	(France) Frédéric Fontang	(Czechoslovakia) Marek Miskolci	
1985	(Netherlands) Richard Krajicek	(France) Philippe Leblanc	
1986	(United States) Michael Chang	(Sweden) Johan Alvén	
1987	(Austria) Reinhard Wawra	(United States) David Klein	
1988	(United States) Brian Dunn	(Austria) Julian Knowle	
1989	(United States) Tommy Shimada	(Spain) Gonzalo Corrales	
1990	(France) Maxime Boyé	(Sweden) Magnus Norman	
1991	(Romania) Răzvan Sabău	(Spain) Juan António Saiz	
1992	(France) Olivier Mutis	(Sweden) Björn Rehnquist	
1993	(Slovenia) Miha Gregorc	(Romania) Dumitru Caradima	
1994	(Spain) Juan Carlos Ferrero	(Chile) Fernando González	
1995	(Belgium) Olivier Rochus	(Slovenia) Gasper Martinjak	
1996	(France) Paul-Henri Mathieu	(Bulgaria) Todor Enev	
1997	(France) Julien Maigret	(Spain) Carlos Cuadrado	2–6, 6–1, 6–2
1998	(United Kingdom) Matthew Smith	(Croatia) Mario Ančić	6–1, 6–3
1999	(France) Richard Gasquet	(United States) Brian Baker	7–5, 6–3
2000	(Spain) Rafael Nadal	(France) Julien Gely	6–4, 6–1
2001	(Russia) Alexandre Krasnoroutskiy	(United Kingdom) Andy Murray	3–6, 7–5, 6–3
2002	(United States) Dylan Arnould	(Switzerland) Robin Roshardt	6–4, 7–6^{(7–2)}
2003	(United States) Donald Young	(United States) Leo Rosenberg	6–2, 6–1
2004	(Australia) Andrew Thomas	(United Kingdom) Daniel Cox	4–6, 6–2, 6–2
2005	(United States) Chase Buchanan	(Georgia (country)) Lazare Kukhalashvili	6–4, 4–6, 6–4
2006	(Spain) Carlos Boluda	(New Zealand) Sebastian Lavie	7–6^{(7–3)}, 6–3
2007	(Spain) Carlos Boluda	(United States) Christian Harrison	6–2, 6–2
2008	(Canada) Edward Nguyen	(United Kingdom) Liam Broady	6–4, 7–5
2009	(Serbia) Nikola Milojević	(Croatia) Borna Ćorić	6–2, 6–3
2010	(France) Quentin Halys	(United States) Noah Rubin	6–1, 6–2
2011	(United States) Henrik Wiersholm	(Romania) Bogdan Borza	6–2, 5–7, 6–3
2012	(United States) Frances Tiafoe	(United States) William Blumberg	6–0, 6–2
2013	(Italy) Samuele Ramazzotti	(Serbia) Miomir Kecmanović	7–6^{(10–8)}, 0–6, 6–0
2014	(France) Rayane Roumane	(Germany) Nicola Kuhn	5–7, 7–5, 6–1
2015	(Chinese Taipei) Tseng Chun-hsin	(Russia) Timofey Skatov	6–4, 6–1
2016	(United States) Stefan Leustian	(Croatia) Borna Devald	6–2, 6–1
2017	(Italy) Luca Nardi	(Serbia) Hamad Međedović	6–2, 7–5
2018	(Bulgaria) Victor Lilov	(Russia) Mikhail Gorokhov	6–4, 7–6^{(7–6)}
2019	(Czech Republic) Vojtech Petr	(Qatar) Rashed Nawaf	4–6, 6–4, 7–6^{(7–1)}
2020	(Ukraine) Oleksandr Ponomar	(Switzerland) Janis Rafael Simmen	6–4, 6–1
2021	(Czech Republic) Maxim Mrva	(Italy) Federico Cinà	6–3, 3–6, 6–0
2022	(Netherlands) Thijs Boogaard	(United States) Carel Aubriel Ngounoue	3–6, 6–2, 6–3
2023	(United Kingdom) Mark Ceban	(Lebanon) Daniel Jade	6–3, 6–2
2024	(United States) Michael Antonius	(Spain) Izan Banares Lasala	4–6, 6–2, 6–0
2025	(France) Mario Vukovic	(United States) Tristan Ascenzo	6–1, 6–0
2026	(Japan) Lyoma Hotelier	(Switzerland) Richard Mitchell	6–0, 6–1

=== Girls' singles ===
Year	Champion	Runner-up	Score
1983	(France) Sybille Niox-Château	(France) Cécile Bourdaix	
1984	(France) Emmanuelle Derly	(France) Alexia Dechaume	
1985	(Switzerland) Sandrine Jaquet	(Sweden) Annika Narbe	
1986	(United States) Laxmi Poruri	(Netherlands) Yvonne Grubben	
1987	(United States) Kim Kessaris	(Austria) Ursula Priller	
1988	(West Germany) Anke Huber	(West Germany) Katherine Denn Samuel	
1989	(France) Nicole London	(Czechoslovakia) Zdeňka Málková	
1990	(West Germany) Heike Rusch	(United States) Lindsay Davenport	
1991	(Switzerland) Martina Hingis	(Madagascar) Dally Randriantefy	
1992	(Switzerland) Martina Hingis	(Hungary) Rita Kuti-Kis	
1993	(United States) Stephanie Halsell	(Hungary) Réka Vidáts	
1994	(Russia) Anna Kournikova	(Germany) Stephanie Kovacik	
1995	(Croatia) Mirjana Lučić	(Belgium) Justine Henin	
1996	(Croatia) Jelena Pandžić	(United States) Melissa Middleton	
1997	(Belgium) Kim Clijsters	(Russia) Elena Bovina	7–5, 3–6, 6–2
1998	(Russia) Lina Krasnoroutskaya	(Germany) Caroline Raba	
1999	(United States) Bethanie Mattek	(Croatia) Matea Mezak	
2000	(Russia) Dinara Safina	(Lithuania) Lina Stančiūtė	
2001	(Federal Republic of Yugoslavia) Vojislava Lukić	(Bulgaria) Dia Evtimova	
2002	(Switzerland) Timea Bacsinszky	(Russia) Alisa Kleybanova	
2003	(Switzerland) Timea Bacsinszky	(Romania) Raluca Olaru	
2004	(Russia) Elena Kulikova	(United States) Madison Brengle	6–4, 6–4
2005	(Russia) Ksenia Pervak	(France) Gracia Radovanovic	6–1, 6–4
2006	(Canada) Gabriela Dabrowski	(Russia) Anna Arina Marenko	6–3, 6–4
2007	(Belarus) Anna Orlik	(United States) Nicole Gibbs	6–4, 6–1
2008	(Russia) Daria Gavrilova	(United Kingdom) Laura Robson	6–3, 6–3
2009	(Russia) Yulia Putintseva	(Russia) Irina Khromacheva	6–4, 6–2
2010	(Japan) Kanami Tsuji	(Netherlands) Indy de Vroome	4–6, 6–3, 6–4
2011	(Latvia) Jeļena Ostapenko	(Russia) Anastasiya Komardina	1–6, 6–3, 6–3
2012	(Romania) Jaqueline Cristian	(United States) Tornado Alicia Black	6–2, 6–3
2013	(United States) CiCi Bellis	(Romania) Andreea Amalia Roșca	6–0, 6–2
2014	(Canada) Bianca Andreescu	(United States) Claire Liu	6–4, 7–5
2015	(Russia) Anastasia Potapova	(Serbia) Olga Danilović	6–4, 6–4
2016	(Ukraine) Marta Kostyuk	(Czech Republic) Denisa Hindová	6–2, 6–1
2017	(Russia) Maria Timofeeva	(Ukraine) Daria Lopatetska	6–3, 4–6, 6–3
2018	(Philippines) Alexandra Eala	(Czech Republic) Linda Nosková	5–7, 6–3, 7–6^{(7–5)}
2019	(Czech Republic) Linda Fruhvirtová	(Belgium) Sofia Costoulas	6–1, 6–0
2020	(Czech Republic) Brenda Fruhvirtová	(United States) Clervie Ngounoue	6–0, 3–6, 7–5
2021	(France) Mathilde Ngijol Carre	(Israel) Mika Buchnik	4–6, 6–2, 6–1
2022	(Germany) Julia Stusek	(United Kingdom) Hannah Klugman	6–3, 6–3
2023	Anna Pushkareva	(Romania) Giulia Safina Popa	7–5, 6–1
2024	Mariia Makarova	Kseniia Ruchkina	6–3, 6–2
2025	Ekaterina Dotsenko	(Latvia) Darina Matvejeva	6–3, 6–4
2026	Aleksandra Karabanova	(Estonia) Elizaveta Anikina	5–7, 7–6^{(7–5)}, 6–0

== Exhibitions ==
The tournament often features retired and/or active players making appearances in exhibition matches in the evening preceding the final day of play. It is common for upcoming and veteran French players to be present. In recent tournaments, players present have included:

- 2004: Yannick Noah and Henri Leconte.
- 2005: Juan Carlos Ferrero (a former champion) and David Nalbandian, who replaced compatriot and French Open champion Gastón Gaudio at the last minute.
- 2006: Rafael Nadal and Fabrice Santoro.
- 2007: Richard Gasquet and Gaël Monfils.
- 2008: Fabrice Santoro and Marc Gicquel, after Paul-Henri Mathieu and Jo-Wilfried Tsonga withdrew. Mathieu, who had injured himself at the 2008 Australian Open, signed autographs instead.
