= African Artistic Gymnastics Championships – Women's individual all-around =

The African Artistic Gymnastics Championships were first held in 1990.

In the women's individual all-around event, three medals are awarded: gold for first place, silver for second place, and bronze for third place.

== Medalists ==
| Year | Location | Gold | Silver | Bronze | Ref |
|---|---|---|---|---|---|
| 1990 | (Algeria) Algiers | Unknown | | | |
| 1992 | (Morocco) Casablanca | Unknown | | | |
| 1994 | (South Africa) Johannesburg | (South Africa) Heidi Oosthuizen | (South Africa) Joanne West | (South Africa) Ilse Roets | |
| 1998 | (Namibia) Walvis Bay | (South Africa) Nadine de Kock | (South Africa) Caroline Demetriou | (Egypt) Dalal Rates | |
| 2000 | (Tunisia) Tunis | (Tunisia) Leonia Marzouk | (South Africa) Tamaryn Schultz | (South Africa) Caroline Demetriou | |
| 2002 | (Algeria) Algiers | (South Africa) Tamaryn Schultz | (South Africa) Zandre Labuschagne | (South Africa) Kerry Joyce | |
| 2004 | (Senegal) Thiès | (South Africa) Zandre Labuschagne | (Egypt) Celeste Visagie | (South Africa) Yana Vizer | |
| 2006 | (South Africa) Cape Town | (South Africa) Rinette Whelpton | (Egypt) Candice Cronje | (South Africa) Chantel Swan | |
| 2009 | (Egypt) Cairo | (Egypt) Sherine El Zeiny | (South Africa) Jennifer Khwela | (Egypt) Salma Mahmoud | |
| 2010 | (Namibia) Walvis Bay | (Egypt) Salma Mahmoud | (Egypt) Farida Ahmed | (South Africa) Jennifer Khwela | |
| 2012 | (Tunisia) Tunis | (Egypt) Salma Mahmoud | (South Africa) Kirsten Beckett | (Egypt) Nancy Taman | |
| 2014 | (South Africa) Pretoria | (South Africa) Kirsten Beckett | (South Africa) Bianca Mann | (Egypt) Rowan Wageeh | |
| 2016 | (Algeria) Algiers | (Egypt) Sherine El Zeiny | (South Africa) Claudia Cummins | (South Africa) Kirsten Beckett | |
| 2018 | (Namibia) Swakopmund | (Egypt) Farah Hussein | (Egypt) Farah Salem | (South Africa) Angela Maguire | |
| 2021 | (Egypt) Cairo | (Egypt) Zeina Ibrahim | (Egypt) Farah Hussein | (South Africa) Naveen Daries | |
| 2022 | (Egypt) Cairo | (South Africa) Caitlin Rooskrantz | (Egypt) Jana Aboelhasan | (Egypt) Jana Abdelsalam | |
| 2023 | (South Africa) Pretoria | (Algeria) Kaylia Nemour | (South Africa) Caitlin Rooskrantz | (Egypt) Jana Abdelsalam | |
| 2024 | (Morocco) Marrakesh | (Egypt) Jana Mahmoud | (Egypt) Judy Abdalla | (Morocco) Salina Bousmayo | |
| 2026 | (Cameroon) Yaoundé | (Algeria) Kaylia Nemour | (South Africa) Caitlin Rooskrantz | (Algeria) Djenna Laroui | |
