= Algeria women's national artistic gymnastics team =

National sports team

Algeria
- Continental union: African Gymnastics Union

Olympic Games
- Appearances: 0

World Championships
- Appearances: 0

Mediterranean Games
- Medals: Bronze: 2026

African Games
- Medals: Silver: 2019; Bronze: 2015

African Championships
- Medals: Gold: 2026; Bronze: 2016, 2018, 2022, 2023

The Algeria women's national artistic gymnastics team represents Algeria in World Gymnastics international competitions.

== History ==
Algeria has never fielded a team at the Olympic Games. Farah Boufadene became the first Algerian female artistic gymnast to compete at the Olympic Games, doing so in 2016. At the 2024 Olympic Games, Kaylia Nemour became the first Algerian gymnast, as well as the first gymnast from the African continent, to win an Olympic medal, doing so on the uneven bars.

At the 2023 World Championships, Nemour won silver on the uneven bars, becoming the first World medalist from Algeria. In 2025, she won gold on the apparatus, becoming the first Algerian World Champion in artistic gymnastics.

== Team competition results ==
=== World Championships ===
Year	Position	Squad
2026	20th place	Louna Hamames-Moallic, Sihem Hamidi, Lena Khenoun, Djenna Laroui, Kaylia Nemour

== Most decorated gymnasts ==
This list includes all Algerian female artistic gymnasts who have won a medal at the Olympic Games or the World Artistic Gymnastics Championships.

Rank	Gymnast	Team	AA	VT	UB	BB	FX	Olympic Total	World Total	Total
1	Kaylia Nemour				2024; 2025; 2026; 2023	2026; 2025		1	5	6

== See also ==
- List of Olympic female artistic gymnasts for Algeria
