= Mandy Mohamed =

Dutch-Egyptian artistic gymnast (born 2000)

Mandy Mohamed ماندي محمد
- Full name: Mandy Mohamed
- Born: 23 February 2000 (age 26) Haarlem, Netherlands

Gymnastics career
- Discipline: Women's artistic gymnastics
- Country represented: Egypt (2016–2021)
- Former countries represented: Netherlands (2014–2015)
- Club: SV Pax Haarlemmermeer
- Head coach: Patrick Kiens
- Assistant coach: Daymon Montaigne-Jones
Medal record
Representing Egypt
African Games
| Gold medal – first place | 2019 Rabat | Team |
| Gold medal – first place | 2019 Rabat | Floor Exercise |
| Silver medal – second place | 2019 Rabat | Balance Beam |
African Championships
| Gold medal – first place | 2016 Algiers | Team |
| Gold medal – first place | 2016 Algiers | Floor Exercise |
FIG World Cup
Event / 1st / 2nd / 3rd; World Challenge Cup / 0 / 0 / 1

Mandy Mohamed (Arabic: ماندي محمد, born 23 February 2000) is a Dutch-Egyptian artistic gymnast. She represented Egypt at the 2020 Olympic Games and was a member of the teams who won gold at the 2019 African Games and the 2016 African Championships.

== Personal life ==
Mohamed was born in Haarlem in 2000 to Egyptian parents. She speaks Arabic, Dutch, and English and was inspired by Dutch-born Egyptian gymnast Sherine El-Zeiny.

== Junior gymnastics career ==
Mohamed was a member of the Dutch junior national team. She competed at the Dutch Championships and placed fifth in the all-around. Additionally, she placed fourth on floor exercise and sixth on uneven bars and balance beam. In November, at the Dutch Team Championships, she helped her club finish third.

In 2015 Mohamed competed at the Flanders International Team Challenge in Ghent, where she helped the Netherlands finish seventh.

== Senior gymnastics career ==
=== 2016–17 ===
Mohamed turned senior in 2016 and decided to represent Egypt in international competitions. She made her senior debut at the Sidijk Tournament, finishing fourth in the all-around. She competed at the African Championships in Algiers, where she helped Egypt win gold in the team competition. Individually she won gold on floor exercise and placed fourth on the balance beam. She next competed at the IAG SportEvent in 's-Hertogenbosch where she placed sixth in the all-around. At the Dutch National Championships, Mohamed placed sixteenth in the all-around and fourth on floor exercise. In October Mohamed competed at the Wase Gymcup where she finished second in the all-around behind Naomi Visser. At the Dutch Team Championships, Mohamed helped her club finish first. Mohamed ended the season competing at the Turnkunst International in Hamburg where she helped her team finish third and individually she finished fourth in the all-around.

In 2017 Mohamed competed at the Flanders International Team Challenge, where she helped her team finish fifth. At the Dutch Championships that year Mohamed only competed on balance beam and floor exercise.

=== 2018 ===
Mohamed competed at the Mediterranean Games alongside Sherine El-Zeiny, Farah Hussein, Farah Salem, and Nancy Taman. They finished fourth as a team. Individually Mohamed qualified to the floor exercise final, where she finished fifth. She next competed at the Paris Challenge Cup where she placed eighth on floor exercise. At the Leverkusen Cup, Mohamed finished first in the all-around and helped her team finish fourth.

Mohamed was selected to represent Egypt at the 2018 World Championships alongside Farah Hussein, Farah Salem, and Nancy Taman. During qualifications, they finished twenty-fifth as a team, which was Egypt's highest team placement in World Championship history.

=== 2019 ===
Mohamed competed at the African Games along with teammates Farah Hussein, Farah Salem, Zeina Ibrahim, and Nancy Taman. They won gold in the team competition. Individually Mohamed had the third-highest all-around score but did not medal due to teammates Hussein and Salem scoring higher. However, she won gold on the floor exercise and silver on the balance beam behind Hussein. At the World Championships Mohamed finished 60th in the all-around qualification. Although she didn't qualify to the final, she qualified as an individual to the 2020 Olympic Games.

=== 2021 ===
In June, Mohamed competed at the Cairo World Challenge Cup where she won the bronze medal on floor exercise behind Zója Székely and Diana Varinska and she finished fifth on the uneven bars. At the Olympic Games Mohamed finished 67th during qualifications.

== Competitive history ==
| Year | Event | Team | AA | VT | UB | BB | FX |
Junior
| 2014 | Dutch Championships | | 5 | | 6 | 6 | 4 |
| 2014 | Dutch Team Championships | 3rd place, bronze medalist(s) | | | | | |
| 2015 | FIT Challenge | 7 | | | | | |
Senior
| 2016 | Sidijk Tournament | | 4 | | | | |
| 2016 | African Championships | 1st place, gold medalist(s) | | | | 4 | 1st place, gold medalist(s) |
| 2016 | IAG SportEvent | | 6 | | | | |
| 2016 | Dutch Championships | | 16 | 6 | 11 | | 4 |
| 2016 | Wase Gymcup | | 2nd place, silver medalist(s) | | | | |
| 2016 | Dutch Team Championships | 1st place, gold medalist(s) | | | | | |
| 2016 | Turnkunst International | 3rd place, bronze medalist(s) | 4 | | | | |
| 2017 | FIT Challenge | 5 | | | | | |
| 2018 | Mediterranean Games | 4 | | | | | 5 |
| 2018 | Paris Challenge Cup | | | | | | 8 |
| 2018 | Leverkusen Cup | 4 | 1st place, gold medalist(s) | | | | |
| 2018 | World Championships | 25 | 63 | | | | |
| 2018 | Dutch Team Championships | 3rd place, bronze medalist(s) | | | | | |
2019
| 2019 | African Games | 1st place, gold medalist(s) | | | | 2nd place, silver medalist(s) | 1st place, gold medalist(s) |
| 2019 | Paris Challenge Cup | | | | | | R3 |
| 2019 | World Championships | 24 | 60 | | | | |
| 2021 | Cairo Challenge Cup | | | | 5 | | 3rd place, bronze medalist(s) |
| 2021 | Olympic Games | | 67 | | | | |
