= Hillal Metidji =

Algerian artistic gymnast

- هلال متيجي
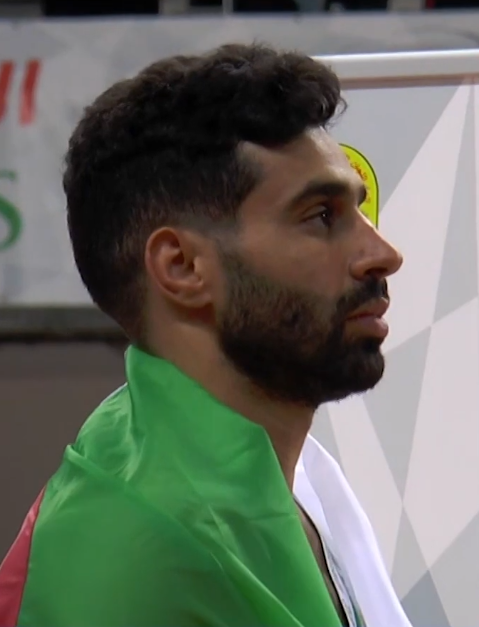
- Metidji in 2023

Personal information
- Full name: Hillal Metidji
- Nicknames: Gualliano; Chichi
- Born: January 21, 1992 (age 34) Boufarik, Algeria

Gymnastics career
- Discipline: Men's artistic gymnastics
- Country represented: Algeria (2009–present)
- Head coach: Nacer Eddine Aroussi
Medal record
Representing Algeria
African Games
Gold medal – first place	2015 Brazzaville	Team
Gold medal – first place	2019 Rabat	Team
Gold medal – first place	2019 Rabat	All-around
Gold medal – first place	2019 Rabat	Parallel bars
Silver medal – second place	2015 Brazzaville	Parallel bars
Silver medal – second place	2019 Rabat	Horizontal bar
Bronze medal – third place	2015 Brazzaville	Pommel horse
African Championships
Gold medal – first place	2014 Pretoria	Team
Gold medal – first place	2014 Pretoria	All-around
Gold medal – first place	2016 Algiers	Team
Gold medal – first place	2016 Algiers	All-around
Gold medal – first place	2018 Swakopmund	Team
Gold medal – first place	2018 Swakopmund	Parallel bars
Silver medal – second place	2012 Tunis	Team
Silver medal – second place	2016 Algiers	Pommel horse
Silver medal – second place	2016 Algiers	Parallel bars
Silver medal – second place	2018 Swakopmund	All-around
Silver medal – second place	2022 Cairo	Team
Silver medal – second place	2022 Cairo	Parallel bars
Silver medal – second place	2022 Cairo	Horizontal bar
Silver medal – second place	2023 Pretoria	Team
Bronze medal – third place	2018 Swakopmund	Pommel horse
Bronze medal – third place	2018 Swakopmund	Rings
Bronze medal – third place	2022 Cairo	All-around
Bronze medal – third place	2023 Pretoria	All-around
Islamic Solidarity Games
Silver medal – second place	2017 Baku	Parallel bars
Arab Games
Gold medal – first place	2023 Oran	Team
Gold medal – first place	2023 Oran	Rings
Bronze medal – third place	2011 Doha	Team
Bronze medal – third place	2011 Doha	All-around

Hillal Metidji (Arabic: هلال متيجي, born January 21, 1992) is an Algerian artistic gymnast. He is the 2019 African Games champion as well as the 2014 and 2016 African champion.

== Early life ==
Metidji was born in Boufarik, Algeria in 1992.

== Gymnastics career ==
=== 2011–2013 ===
Metidji competed at the 2011 Arab Games where he helped Algeria finish third; individually he finished third in the all-around behind Egyptians Mohamed El-Saharty and Ashraf Mostafa. In 2012 Metidji competed at his first. senior level African Championships, helping Algeria finish second behind Egypt.

=== 2014–2016 ===
At the 2014 African Championships Metidji helped Algeria place first as team. Additionally, he also won gold in the all-around ahead of Mohamed El-Saharty and compatriot Mohamed Bourguieg. The following year he competed at the 2015 African Games, once again helping Algeria win gold as a team. Individually he won silver on parallel bars and bronze on pommel horse. At the 2016 African Championships Metidji defended his all-around title.

=== 2017–2019 ===
At the 2018 African Championships Metidji helped Algeria place first as a team for the third consecutive time. However, he was unable to defend his all-around title and placed second behind Omar Mohamed. At the 2019 African Games Metidji won the all-around competition as well as helped Algeria place first as a team.

=== 2021–2023 ===
Metidji competed at the 2022 Mediterranean Games and qualified to the all-around final; however, he later withdrew due to a minor injury. He returned to competition for the 2022 African Championships where he won bronze in the all-around and helped Algeria finish second behind Egypt. In doing so, he earned an individual berth to compete at the 2022 World Championships.

At the 2023 African Championships, Metidji once again won the bronze medal in the all-around. He next competed at the 2023 Arab Games where he helped Algeria finish first as team. Individually, he won gold on rings.

== Competitive history ==
Year	Event	Team	AA	FX	PH	SR	VT	PB	HB
2009
2009	World Championships		64						
2010
2010	World Championships		159						
2011	Arab Games	3rd place, bronze medalist(s)	3rd place, bronze medalist(s)						
2012
2012	African Championships	2nd place, silver medalist(s)							
2013
2013	World Championships		43						
2014
2014	African Championships	1st place, gold medalist(s)	1st place, gold medalist(s)						
2014	World Championships		118						
2015
2015	African Games	1st place, gold medalist(s)			3rd place, bronze medalist(s)			2nd place, silver medalist(s)	
2015	World Championships		115						
2016
2016	African Championships	1st place, gold medalist(s)	1st place, gold medalist(s)		2nd place, silver medalist(s)			2nd place, silver medalist(s)	
2017	Islamic Solidarity Games							2nd place, silver medalist(s)	
2017	World Championships		201						
2018	Mediterranean Games	10							
2018	African Championships	1st place, gold medalist(s)	2nd place, silver medalist(s)		3rd place, bronze medalist(s)	3rd place, bronze medalist(s)		1st place, gold medalist(s)	
2019
2019	African Games	1st place, gold medalist(s)	1st place, gold medalist(s)					1st place, gold medalist(s)	2nd place, silver medalist(s)
2019	World Championships		151						
2021
2021	African Championships		7						
2022	Mediterranean Games	9	WD						
2022	African Championships	2nd place, silver medalist(s)	3rd place, bronze medalist(s)		6	3rd place, bronze medalist(s)	6	2nd place, silver medalist(s)	2nd place, silver medalist(s)
2022	World Championships		159						
2023	Arab Games	1st place, gold medalist(s)				1st place, gold medalist(s)			
2023	African Championships	2nd place, silver medalist(s)	3rd place, bronze medalist(s)						
2023	World Championships		77						
