= Artistic gymnastics at the 2026 Mediterranean Games – Men's artistic individual all-around =

Men's artistic individual all-around at the 2026 Mediterranean Games
- Venue: Grottaglie Sports Hall
- Date: 1 September 2026
- Competitors: 15
- Winning total: 80.450

Medalists
gold medal	(Cyprus) Marios Georgiou
silver medal	(Spain) Nicolau Mir
bronze medal	(Egypt) Omar Mohamed

The Men's artistic individual all-around competition at the 2026 Mediterranean Games was held on 1 September 2026 at the Grottaglie Sports Hall.

== Qualification ==
Position	Gymnast	Floor (gymnastics)	Pommel horse	Rings (gymnastics)	Vault (gymnastics)	Parallel bars	Horizontal bar	Total	Notes
1	Marios Georgiou (CYP)	12.950	12.300	13.300	13.250	13.450	14.250	79.500	Q
2	Mert Efe Kılıçer (TUR)	13.450	12.450	12.150	13.250	13.550	14.200	79.050	Q
3	Antonios Tantalidis (GRE)	13.850	13.700	12.050	14.050	12.450	12.750	78.850	Q
4	Nicolau Mir (ESP)	13.450	12.900	12.750	13.150	13.850	11.800	77.900	Q
5	Swaimy Bellil (FRA)	13.500	12.150	12.400	13.400	12.600	13.600	77.650	Q
6	Omar Mohamed (EGY)	11.350	13.200	13.900	13.700	12.150	13.250	77.550	Q
7	Ivan Burnello (ITA)	13.750	12.000	12.950	12.750	13.050	12.550	77.050	Q
8	Mohamed Afify (EGY)	12.850	13.700	12.450	12.750	13.150	11.850	76.750	Q
9	Tommaso Brugnami (ITA)	12.400	12.700	12.550	13.500	13.200	12.350	76.700	Q
10	Stefano Patron (ITA)	12.850	12.250	12.800	13.150	13.450	12.050	76.550	–
11	Kevin Buckley (SLO)	12.800	13.350	12.250	11.800	12.950	13.000	76.150	Q
12	Hamza Hossaini (MAR)	12.000	10.850	12.550	14.200	13.000	12.700	75.300	~~Q~~ WD
13	Alperen Ege Avcı (TUR)	13.250	10.350	12.350	13.500	12.750	12.750	74.950	~~Q~~ WD
14	Thierno Diallo (ESP)	12.600	13.100	12.300	11.950	13.350	11.650	74.950	Q
15	Apostolos Kanellos (GRE)	12.000	12.650	11.600	12.700	12.150	13.800	74.900	~~Q~~ WD
16	Daniel Carrión Caro (ESP)	12.900	10.600	12.850	13.350	12.900	12.150	74.750	–
17	Ioannis Chronopoulos (GRE)	12.650	12.950	12.300	12.400	12.950	11.450	74.700	–
18	Houssem Hamadouche (ALG)	12.450	11.250	12.350	13.450	12.200	12.350	74.050	Q
19	Luis Lechaud (POR)	10.400	13.000	12.750	13.100	12.100	12.250	73.600	Q
20	Adam Cogat (ALG)	12.050	11.650	11.700	13.650	11.250	12.850	73.150	Q
21	Michalis Isaias (CYP)	10.750	11.150	11.400	12.650	11.450	12.200	69.600	Q

== Final ==
Rank	Gymnast	Floor (gymnastics)	Pommel horse	Rings (gymnastics)	Vault (gymnastics)	Parallel bars	Horizontal bar	Total
1st place, gold medalist(s)	Marios Georgiou (CYP)	12.450	13.600	13.350	13.350	13.900	13.800	80.450
2nd place, silver medalist(s)	Nicolau Mir (ESP)	13.600	12.500	12.800	13.600	13.700	13.150	79.350
3rd place, bronze medalist(s)	Omar Mohamed (EGY)	12.100	13.050	13.950	13.550	13.350	13.050	79.050
4	Swaimy Bellil (FRA)	13.600	11.750	12.900	14.100	13.250	13.150	78.750
5	Mert Efe Kılıçer (TUR)	12.850	12.900	11.900	13.350	13.550	14.100	78.650
6	Tommaso Brugnami (ITA)	13.950	12.250	12.300	14.150	12.600	12.750	78.000
7	Ivan Brunello (ITA)	12.650	12.600	12.800	13.200	12.950	13.600	77.800
8	Kevin Buckley (SLO)	12.400	12.950	12.750	12.550	13.400	13.400	77.450
9	Antonios Tantalidis (GRE)	13.850	12.250	11.850	14.150	12.100	12.700	76.900
10	Houssem Hamadouche (ALG)	12.750	11.850	12.200	13.600	12.200	12.100	74.700
11	Mohamed Afify (EGY)	11.900	11.350	12.150	13.250	13.150	12.750	74.550
12	Thierno Diallo (ESP)	12.500	11.600	12.500	13.300	11.600	12.350	73.850
13	Adam Cogat (ALG)	13.350	10.100	12.250	13.600	11.050	12.000	72.350
14	Luis Lechaud (POR)	10.850	11.050	12.650	13.450	10.900	12.300	71.200
15	Michalis Isaias (CYP)	10.500	10.400	11.300	11.600	11.200	12.100	67.100
