= Gymnastics at the 2014 Commonwealth Games – Women's artistic individual all-around =

Women's artistic individual all-around at the 2014 Commonwealth Games
- Venue: SSE Hydro
- Dates: 30 July 2014
- Competitors: 24 from 13 nations
- Winning score: 56.132

Medalists
gold medal	Claudia Fragapane	England
silver medal	Ruby Harrold	England
bronze medal	Hannah Whelan	England

The women's artistic individual all-around competition at the 2014 Commonwealth Games was held on 30 July at the SSE Hydro. Claudia Fragapane, Ruby Harrold, and Hannah Whelan swept the medal podium for England.

== Qualification ==
Qualification for the all-around final took place on July 28 and 29 as part of the team and individual qualification event. The top 24 gymnasts from the qualifications advanced into the all-around final. England's Claudia Fragapane qualified in first place with a total score of 56.740, more than a point and a half ahead of second-place qualifier, Canada's Ellie Black. Ruby Harrold finished a point behind Black in third and Elizabeth Beddoe from Wales ranked fourth. Hannah Whelan qualified in fifth place, and South Africa's Kirsten Beckett finished sixth to earn a spot in the top rotation group in the final.

== Competition summary ==
Despite falling off the balance beam, Claudia Fragapane still won the title with a total score of 56.132. Ruby Harrold had the top scores of the day on the vault and the uneven bars, but a fall off the balance beam cost her a chance to win the gold medal. Hannah Whelan was the only gymnast in the group of top-six qualifiers to not fall off the balance beam, but she stumbled on her uneven bars dismount. Ellie Black had a chance to surpass Whelan for the bronze medal but finished fourth after a fall on the floor exercise. Australia's Olivia Vivian finished in fifth place after hitting all four routines. Kirsten Beckett dropped to 15th place due to falls on the uneven bars, balance beam, and floor exercise, and Elizabeth Beddoe finished eighth after also falling off the balance beam.

== Final results ==
Women's all-around final results
Rank	Gymnast	Vault (gymnastics)	Uneven bars	Balance beam	Floor (gymnastics)	Total
1st place, gold medalist(s)	Claudia Fragapane (ENG)	14.733	13.700	12.966	14.733	56.132
2nd place, silver medalist(s)	Ruby Harrold (ENG)	14.800	14.566	12.166	13.700	55.232
3rd place, bronze medalist(s)	Hannah Whelan (ENG)	14.066	13.100	14.033	13.500	54.669
4	Ellie Black (CAN)	14.300	13.758	13.333	12.766	54.157
5	Olivia Vivian (AUS)	12.466	13.800	13.000	13.366	52.632
6	Georgina Hockenhull (WAL)	13.566	13.333	13.733	11.966	52.598
7	Isabela Onyshko (CAN)	13.766	12.000	13.666	13.133	52.565
8	Elizabeth Beddoe (WAL)	13.808	13.533	11.666	13.533	52.540
9	Maegan Chant (CAN)	14.033	10.900	13.333	13.766	52.032
10	Emma White (SCO)	13.900	11.666	12.900	13.066	51.532
11	Farah Ann Abdul Hadi (MAS)	13.933	12.066	12.100	12.966	51.065
12	Brittany Robertson (NZL)	13.700	12.433	11.816	12.733	50.682
13	Georgia Rose Brown (AUS)	14.133	13.066	10.866	12.533	50.598
14	Amy Regan (SCO)	13.666	12.100	11.233	13.433	50.432
15	Kirsten Beckett (RSA)	13.900	12.300	11.700	11.633	49.533
16	Charlotte Sullivan (NZL)	13.366	12.066	11.866	11.800	49.098
17	Nicole Mawhinney (NIR)	13.300	11.266	11.733	12.266	48.565
18	Janessa Dai (SIN)	13.333	10.833	11.666	12.633	48.465
19	Heem Wei Lim (SIN)	13.033	11.600	11.366	12.300	48.299
20	Bianca Mann (RSA)	13.066	12.033	11.000	11.566	47.655
21	Grace Harrison (IOM)	13.133	11.533	10.333	12.600	47.599
22	Dipa Karmakar (IND)	13.833	10.633	12.300	10.666	47.432
23	Claudia Cummins (RSA)	13.966	12.758	8.233	11.933	46.890
24	Stelutsa Savvidou (CYP)	13.733	8.600	10.933	12.366	45.632
