= Claudia Cummins =

South African artistic gymnast (born 1995)

- Full name: Claudia Jane Cummins
- Nickname: Claudz
- Born: 12 June 1995 (age 31)
- Height: 162 cm (5 ft 4 in)

Gymnastics career
- Discipline: Women's artistic gymnastics
- Country represented: South Africa (2012–2016)
- Club: Johannesburg Gymnastics Centre
- Head coach: Ilse Roets-Pelser
- Retired: 2018
Medal record
Representing South Africa
African Games
Gold medal – first place	2015 Brazzaville	Team
Silver medal – second place	2015 Brazzaville	Vault
African Championships
Gold medal – first place	2014 Pretoria	Team
Silver medal – second place	2012 Tunis	Team
Silver medal – second place	2012 Tunis	Uneven bars
Silver medal – second place	2012 Tunis	Balance beam
Silver medal – second place	2016 Algiers	Team
Silver medal – second place	2016 Algiers	All-around
Silver medal – second place	2016 Algiers	Vault
Silver medal – second place	2016 Algiers	Uneven bars
Bronze medal – third place	2016 Algiers	Balance beam
Bronze medal – third place	2016 Algiers	Floor exercise

Claudia Jane Cummins (born 12 June 1995) is a South African former artistic gymnast. She is a 2015 African Games and 2014 African Championships team champion. She is a three-time national all-around silver medalist, and she competed at four World Championships.

== Gymnastics career ==
Cummins represented South Africa at the 2010 Summer Youth Olympics and finished 27th in the all-around qualifications. She helped South Africa win the team silver medal, behind Egypt, at the 2012 African Championships, and she won silver medals on the uneven bars and balance beam. She competed at her first World Championships in 2013 and finished 66th in the all-around qualification round.

At the 2014 African Championships, Cummins helped South Africa win the team title. She then represented South Africa at the 2014 Commonwealth Games with the team that finished sixth. Individually, she advanced to the all-around final and finished 23rd after falling off the balance beam four times. At the 2014 World Championships, she competed in the all-around to help the South African team finish 33rd.

Cummins advanced into the all-around final at the 2015 Summer Universiade and finished 12th. She helped South Africa win the team title at the 2015 African Games, and she won the vault silver medal behind Farah Boufadene. At the World Championships, she finished 107th in the all-around during the qualification round.

Cummins was originally awarded a berth to the 2016 Summer Olympics for continental representation; however, South Africa rejected this spot, and it was reallocated to Egypt's Sherine El-Zeiny. She won six medals at the 2016 African Championships, including the all-around silver medal behind El-Zeiny.

At the 2017 World Championships, Cummins finished 34th in the all-around qualifications, which was the best-ever World all-around result for South Africa. She was the first reserve for the vault and floor exercise finals at the 2018 Baku World Cup. She represented South Africa at the 2018 Commonwealth Games, but during the qualifications, she tore her ACL on her final tumbling pass on the floor exercise. She did qualify for the all-around final but had to withdraw. This was the final competition of her career.
