= 2014 African Artistic Gymnastics Championships =

Artistic Gymnastics Championship

African Artistic Gymnastics Championships
- Venue: University of Pretoria
- Location: Pretoria, South Africa
- Date: 27–30 March 2014

The 2014 African Artistic Gymnastics Championships was the 12th iteration of the event and took place on 27–30 March in Pretoria, South Africa.

== Medal winners ==
=== Senior ===
Event	Gold	Silver	Bronze
Men
Team	(Algeria) Algeria; Hillal Metidji; Mohamed Bourguieg; Walid Hacib; Mohamed Aouicha; Mohamed Reghib	(Egypt) Egypt; Mohamed El-Saharty; Karim Mohamed; Ali Abouel Kassem; Omar Hassen; Tarek Hamdy	(South Africa) South Africa; Siphesihle Biyase; Cameron Mackenzie; Michael Makings; Tiaan Grobler; Siphamandla Ngcob
All-around	Hillal Metidji (ALG)	Mohamed El-Saharty (EGY)	Mohamed Bourguieg (ALG)
Floor Exercise	Med Aziz Trabelsi (TUN)	Rezqi Othmane (MAR)	Mohamed Bourguieg (ALG)
Pommel Horse	Nasser Abderrazak (MAR)	Mohamed El-Saharty (EGY)	Aouicha Mohamed (ALG)
Rings	Ali Abouel Kassem (EGY)	Mohamed El-Saharty (EGY)	Hacib Walid (ALG)
Vault	Mohamed Bourguieg (ALG)		
Parallel Bars			
Horizontal Bar	Mohamed Reghib (ALG)		
Women
Team	(South Africa) South Africa; Kirsten Beckett; Bianca Mann; Claudia Cummins; Alessandra Thompson; Angela Maguire	(Egypt) Egypt; Fadwa Mahmoud; Farida Shokry; Rowan Wageeh; Rana Elbialy; Mai Ahmed Saad	(Morocco) Morocco; Eddachradui Houd; Mariam Elkoukho; Hibat Allah Serry; Houmairi Hayat; Dassalem Najour
All-around	Kirsten Beckett (RSA)	Bianca Mann (RSA)	Rowan Wageeh (EGY)
Vault	Fadwa Mahmoud (EGY)	Kirsten Beckett (RSA)	Rowan Wageeh (EGY)
Uneven Bars	Kirsten Beckett (RSA)	Bianca Mann (RSA)	Mariam Elkoukho (MAR)
Balance Beam	Farida Shokry (EGY)	Bianca Mann (RSA)	Kirsten Beckett (RSA)
Floor Exercise	Kirsten Beckett (RSA)	Rana Elbialy (EGY)	Farida Shokry (EGY)
