= Bianca Mann =

South African artistic gymnast

- Full name: Bianca Fallon Mann
- Born: 21 February 1995 (age 31) Johannesburg, South Africa
- Height: 155 cm (5 ft 1 in)

Gymnastics career
- Discipline: Women's artistic gymnastics
- Country represented: South Africa
- Retired: 2017
Medal record
Women's artistic gymnastics
Representing South Africa
African Games
Gold medal – first place	2015 Brazzaville	Team
African Championships
Gold medal – first place	2014 Pretoria	Team
Silver medal – second place	2012 Tunis	Team
Silver medal – second place	2014 Pretoria	All-around
Silver medal – second place	2014 Pretoria	Uneven bars
Silver medal – second place	2014 Pretoria	Balance beam

Bianca Fallon Mann (born 21 February 1995) is a South African former artistic gymnast. She is the 2015 and 2016 South African all-around champion. She is the 2014 African Championships all-around silver medalist and team champion. Additionally, she competed at the World Championships in 2014 and 2015.

== Gymnastics career ==
Mann helped South African win the team silver medal, behind Egypt, at the 2012 African Championships. Then at the 2014 African Championships, South Africa won the team title, and Mann won the all-around silver medal behind teammate Kirsten Beckett. In the event finals, she won silver medals on the uneven bars and balance beam. She competed for South Africa at the 2014 Commonwealth Games where she finished 20th in the all-around final and sixth in the team final. At the 2014 World Championships, she competed in the all-around to help the South African team finish 33rd.

At the 2015 Doha World Cup, Mann finished sixth on the uneven bars with a score of 12.625. Then, at the 2015 Ljubljana World Cup, she finished fifth on the uneven bars with a score of 11.425. She won the 2015 South African national titles in the all-around and on the uneven bars, and she also won silver on vault and bronze on balance beam and floor exercise. She won a team gold medal at the 2015 African Games. At the 2015 World Championships, she scored 49.432 in the all-around and finished 109th in the qualifications.

Mann won the 2016 South African national titles in the all-around and on the uneven bars, and she also won silver on balance beam and floor exercise. Her last international competition was the 2017 Summer Universiade where she finished 11th with the team and 28th in the all-around. She won the uneven bars bronze medal at the 2017 South African Championships, and this was the final competition of her career.
