= Nada Ayman Ibrahim =

Egyptian artistic gymnast (born 1999)

- Full name: Nada Ayman Ibrahim Fahmy Mohamed Mohamed
- Born: 7 February 1999 (age 27) Cairo, Egypt

Gymnastics career
- Discipline: Women's artistic gymnastics
- Country represented: Egypt
- Club: Cairo Sporting Club
Medal record
Women's artistic gymnastics
Representing Egypt
African Championships
Gold medal – first place	2016 Algiers	Team
Gold medal – first place	2016 Algiers	Balance beam

Nada Ayman Ibrahim Fahmy Mohamed Mohamed (born 7 February 1999) is an Egyptian former artistic gymnast. She competed for Egypt at the 2014 Summer Youth Olympics and at the 2015 World Championships. She is the 2014 African Junior all-around champion and the 2016 African balance beam champion.

== Gymnastics career ==
=== Junior ===
Ibrahim won a gold medal with the junior Egyptian team at the 2012 African Championships. She also helped Egypt win the team title at the 2014 African Junior Championships, and she won the individual all-around title. She was then selected to represent Egypt at the 2014 Summer Youth Olympics. She finished 26th in the all-around during the qualification round, and she was the second reserve for the vault final.

=== Senior ===
Ibrahim became age-eligible for senior competitions in 2015. She competed on all four apparatuses at the 2015 Osijek World Challenge Cup but did not advance into any finals. She then placed 10th in the all-around at the Hungarian Grand Prix. She competed at the 2015 World Championships and finished 144th in the all-around during the qualification round.

At the 2016 African Championships, Ibrahim helped Egypt win the team title, and she placed fourth in the all-around. In the event finals, she won a gold medal on the balance beam by over half a point. She also finished fourth in both the vault and uneven bars finals. Then at the Stella Zakharova Cup, she won a silver medal with the Egyptian team, and she won a silver medal on the vault. She competed on the uneven bars, balance beam, and floor exercise at the 2016 Szombathely World Challenge Cup but did not advance into any finals. This was the final competition of her career.
