= Wajdi Bouallègue =

Tunisian gymnast (born 1982)

- وجدي بوعلاق
- Born: 9 February 1982 (age 44) Tunis, Tunisia
- Height: 1.72 m (5 ft 8 in)

Gymnastics career
- Discipline: Men's artistic gymnastics
- Country represented: Tunisia
- Club: Medjerda Sport Club
Medal record
Men's artistic gymnastics
Representing Tunisia
Mediterranean Games
Gold medal – first place	2005 Almería	Vault
Silver medal – second place	2005 Almería	Floor
Bronze medal – third place	2009 Pescara	Vault
Bronze medal – third place	2013 Mersin	Floor
Bronze medal – third place	2013 Mersin	Vault
African Championships
Gold medal – first place	2012 Tunis	Floor
Gold medal – first place	2012 Tunis	Vault
Silver medal – second place	2012 Tunis	All-around
Silver medal – second place	2012 Tunis	Rings
Silver medal – second place	2012 Tunis	Parallel bars
Pan Arab Games
Gold medal – first place	2011 Doha	Floor
Silver medal – second place	2011 Doha	Rings

Wajdi Bouallègue (Arabic: وجدي بوعلاق; born in Tunis on 9 February 1982) is a Tunisian gymnast. He was the only Tunisian gymnast that competed in the 2004 Summer Olympics and the 2012 Summer Olympics. Wajdi Bouallègue holds a record of 23 gold African medals and has achieved 5 gold medals in a single African championship in Senegal Dakar 2004 (record). He's the only Arab and African gymnast that qualified for 2 consecutive World Cup finals(São Paulo 2006-Madrid 2008).He was elected the best Tunisian sportsmen of the year 2006.
