= 2012 African Artistic Gymnastics Championships =

Artistic Gymnastics Championship

African Artistic Gymnastics Championships
- Venue: El Menzah Sports Palace
- Location: Tunis, Tunisia
- Date: 11–14 April 2012

The 2012 African Artistic Gymnastics Championships was the 11th iteration of the event and took place on 11–14 April in Tunis, Tunisia.

== Medal winners ==
=== Senior ===
Event	Gold	Silver	Bronze
Men
Team	(Egypt) Egypt; Mohamed El-Saharty; Ashraf Eldin; Tarek Shalaby; Islam Shahin; Richard Dobson; Ali El Kassem	(Algeria) Algeria; Walid Hacib; Hillal Metidji; Amine Airour; Belkacem Tahi; Sid Ali Ferdjani	(Morocco) Morocco; Abederazek Naceur; Abedelkarim Satour; Soufiane Bachar; Rachid Moussa; Othmane Rezki
All-around	Mohamed El-Saharty (EGY)	Wajdi Bouallègue (TUN)	Ashraf Eldin (EGY)
Floor Exercise	Wajdi Bouallègue (TUN)	Mohamed El-Saharty (EGY)	Ashraf Eldin (EGY)
Pommel Horse	Walid Hacib (ALG)	Sid Ali Ferdjani (ALG)	Mohamed El-Saharty (EGY)
Rings	Ali El Kassem (EGY)	Wajdi Bouallègue (TUN)	Walid Hacib (ALG)
Vault	Wajdi Bouallègue (TUN)	Mohamed El-Saharty (EGY)	Tarek Shalaby (EGY)
Parallel Bars	Mohamed El-Saharty (EGY)	Wajdi Bouallègue (TUN)	Sid Ali Ferdjani (ALG)
Horizontal Bar	Tabo Mkandawire (RSA)	Mohamed El-Saharty (EGY)	Amine Airour (ALG)
Women
Team	(Egypt) Egypt; Sherine El-Zeiny; Salma Mahmoud; Fadwa Mohamed; Sohyla Hisham Sobhy; Nancy Taman	(South Africa) South Africa; Kirsten Beckett; Claudia Cummins; Jean-Mari Kellerman; Bianca Mann; Nicole Szabo	(Morocco) Morocco; Chaimaa Aamami; Najwa Dassalm; Dina Lazrak; Chaimaa Salih; Chaimaa Zemzami
All-around	Salma Mahmoud (EGY)	Kirsten Beckett (RSA)	Nancy Taman (EGY)
Vault	Fadwa Mahmoud (EGY)	Kirsten Beckett (RSA)	Nancy Taman (EGY)
Uneven Bars	Salma Mahmoud (EGY)	Claudia Cummins (RSA)	Sohyla Hisham Sobhy (EGY)
Balance Beam	Kirsten Beckett (RSA)	Claudia Cummins (RSA)	Salma Mahmoud (EGY)
Floor Exercise	Kirsten Beckett (RSA)	Nancy Taman (EGY)	Sherine El-Zeiny (EGY)

== Medal table ==
=== Combined ===
Rank	Nation	Gold	Silver	Bronze	Total
1	Egypt (EGY)	8	4	9	21
2	South Africa (RSA)	3	5	0	8
3	Tunisia (TUN)	2	3	0	5
4	Algeria (ALG)	1	2	3	6
5	Morocco (MAR)	0	0	2	2
Totals (5 entries)		14	14	14	42

=== Men ===
Rank	Nation	Gold	Silver	Bronze	Total
1	Egypt (EGY)	4	3	4	11
2	Tunisia (TUN)	2	3	0	5
3	Algeria (ALG)	1	2	3	6
4	South Africa (RSA)	1	0	0	1
5	Morocco (MAR)	0	0	1	1
Totals (5 entries)		8	8	8	24

=== Women ===
Rank	Nation	Gold	Silver	Bronze	Total
1	Egypt (EGY)	4	1	5	10
2	South Africa (RSA)	2	5	0	7
3	Morocco (MAR)	0	0	1	1
Totals (3 entries)		6	6	6	18
