= African Gymnastics Championships =

African Gymnastics Championships may refer to:

- African Artistic Gymnastics Championships, continental competition for artistic gymnastics
- African Rhythmic Gymnastics Championships, continental competition for rhythmic gymnastics
