= Uche Eke =

Nigerian-American gymnast (born 1997)

- Full name: Uche Devon Eke
- Nickname: Uchemantellem
- Born: August 12, 1997 (age 29) Gaithersburg, Maryland, US

Gymnastics career
- Discipline: Men's artistic gymnastics
- Country represented: Nigeria
- College team: Michigan Wolverines (2016–2020)
- Club: Fairland Gymnastics
- Head coach: Kurt Golder
Medal record
Men's artistic gymnastics
Representing Nigeria
African Games
Gold medal – first place	2019 Rabat	Pommel horse
Bronze medal – third place	2019 Rabat	Parallel bars
African Championships
Bronze medal – third place	2021 Cairo	All-around

Uche Devon Eke (born August 12, 1997) is a Nigerian-American gymnast. At the 2020 Summer Olympics, he became Nigeria's first Olympic gymnast. He qualified for the Olympics by winning the bronze medal in the all-around at the 2021 African Championships. He is the 2019 African Games pommel horse champion and parallel bars bronze medalist.

== Early life ==
Eke was born in Gaithersburg, Maryland, United States, on August 12, 1997, to an American mother and a Nigerian father. He began gymnastics when he was four years old. He graduated from Our Lady of Good Counsel High School in 2015.

== Career ==
Eke was recruited by the head coach of the Michigan Wolverines men's gymnastics team during the 2013–14 academic year. He then joined the team in 2016. During his first three seasons, he competed on the pommel horse, the horizontal bar, and the parallel bars. He missed his senior season due to a shoulder injury and earned a redshirt year for the 2020 season.

Eke represented Nigeria at the 2019 African Games where he won the gold medal on the pommel horse, becoming the first Nigerian gymnast to win gold at the African Games. He also won the bronze medal on the parallel bars. At the 2019 World Championships in Stuttgart, he competed on the pommel horse, parallel bars, and horizontal bar, but he did not advance into any event finals.

Eke competed for Michigan on the pommel horse, vault, parallel bars, and horizontal bar during the 2020 season as a graduate student, but the end of the season was canceled due to the COVID-19 pandemic in the United States. He was named to the Academic All-Big Ten team and was named a Big Ten Distinguished Scholar.

Eke won the all-around bronze medal at the 2021 African Championships and qualified for the 2020 Olympic Games. He then competed at the 2020 Summer Olympics in Tokyo, Japan. He became the first gymnast to represent Nigeria at the Olympics. He finished fifty-eighth in the all-around during the qualification round with a total score of 74.265 and did not advance into any finals.

== Education ==
In May 2019, Eke graduated from the University of Michigan with a bachelor's degree in computer science engineering. He also holds a master's degree in information science from the University of Michigan.
