= 2016 African Artistic Gymnastics Championships =

African Artistic Gymnastics Championships
- Venue: La Coupole d'Alger Arena
- Location: Algiers, Algeria
- Date: March 23–26, 2016
- Competitors: 63 from 7 nations

The 2016 African Artistic Gymnastics Championships was the 13th iteration of the event and took place on March 23–26 in Algiers, Algeria.

Both senior and junior level titles were contested at this event.

== Medal winners ==
=== Senior ===
Event	Gold	Silver	Bronze
Men
Team	(Algeria) Algeria; Mohamed Aouicha; Mohamed Bourguieg; Anes Maoudj; Hillal Metidji; Mohamed Raghib	(Egypt) Egypt; Ahmed El Maraghy; Mohamed Moubarak; Islam El Sayed; Tarek Shalaby; Ali Zahran	(Morocco) Morocco; Soufiane Bachar; Aymen Goutou; Hamza Hossaini; Abderrazak Nasser
All-around	Hillal Metidji (ALG)	Mohamed Bourguieg (ALG)	Tarek Shalaby (EGY)
Floor Exercise	Mohamed Bourguieg (ALG)	Harzi Wissem (TUN)	Mohamed Aouicha (ALG)
Pommel Horse	Mohamed Aouicha (ALG)	Hillal Metidji (ALG)	Harzi Wissem (TUN)
Rings	Ali Zahran (EGY)	Tarek Shalaby (EGY)	Mohamed Bourguieg (ALG)
Vault	Mohamed Bourguieg (ALG)	Hamza Hossaini (MAR)	Mohamed Moubarak (EGY)
Parallel Bars	Mohamed Bourguieg (ALG)	Hillal Metidji (ALG)	Harzi Wissem (TUN)
Horizontal Bar	Mohamed Reghib (ALG)	Ahmed El Maraghy (EGY)	Mohamed Bourguieg (ALG)
Women
Team	(Egypt) Egypt; Sherine El Zeiny; Nada Ayman Ibrahim; Mandy Mohamed; Mai Ahmed Saad; Rahaf Armia Zakaria	(South Africa) South Africa; Claudia Cummins; Kirsten Beckett; Aatiqah Abrahams; Lukisha Schalk	(Algeria) Algeria; Chama Temmami; Farah Boufadene; Meriam Menighed; Fatima Ahlem Mokhtari; Celia Haroune
All-around	Sherine El Zeiny (EGY)	Claudia Cummins (RSA)	Kirsten Beckett (RSA)
Vault	Kirsten Beckett (RSA)	Claudia Cummins (RSA)	Mai Ahmed Saad (EGY)
Uneven Bars	Rahaf Armia Zakaria (EGY)	Claudia Cummins (RSA)	Kirsten Beckett (RSA)
Balance Beam	Nada Ayman Ibrahim (EGY)	Lukisha Schalk (RSA)	Claudia Cummins (RSA)
Floor Exercise	Mandy Mohamed (EGY)	Kirsten Beckett (RSA)	Claudia Cummins (RSA)

=== Junior ===
Event	Gold	Silver	Bronze
Men
Team	(Egypt) Egypt; Abdelrah Abdelhaleem; Ahmed Ali Amin; Omar El Araby; Abdelrahman Faheem; Mohamed Hassan	(Morocco) Morocco; Abdelaziz Essamyry; Anass Naciri; Achraf Quistas; Mehdi Tougui	—N/a
All-around	Abdelrahman Faheem (EGY)	Ahmed Ali Amin (EGY)	Mehdi Tougui (MAR)
Floor Exercise	Omar El Araby (EGY)	Abdelrahman Faheem (EGY)	Ayoub Hamida (ALG)
Pommel Horse	Abdelrahman Faheem (EGY)	Abdelrahman Abdelhaleem (EGY)	Mehdi Tougui (MAR)
Rings	Abdelrahman Faheem (EGY)	Ahmed Ali Amin (EGY)	Mehdi Tougui (MAR)
Vault	Abdelrahman Faheem (EGY)	Omar El Araby (EGY)	Mehdi Tougui (MAR)
Parallel Bars	Abdelrahman Faheem (EGY)	Ahmed Ali Amin (EGY)	Mehdi Tougui (MAR)
Horizontal Bar	Abdelrahman Faheem (EGY)	Mehdi Tougui (MAR)	Omar El Araby (EGY)
Women
Team	(Egypt) Egypt; Farah Hussein; Zeina Ibrahim; Alia Mostafa; Farah Salem; Mariam Osama Wafaei	(South Africa) South Africa; Naveen Daries; Caitlyn Kelly; Paige McElligot; Jade Pailman; Caitlin Rooskrantz	(Morocco) Morocco; Nisrine Aabab; Imane Balad; Loubna Satour; Salma Tougui
All-around	Farah Hussein (EGY)	Caitlin Rooskrantz (RSA)	Naveen Daries (RSA) Farah Salem (EGY)
Vault	Chahed Sakr (TUN)	Alia Mostafa (EGY)	Naveen Daries (RSA)
Uneven Bars	Caitlin Rooskrantz (RSA)	Farah Hussein (EGY)	Farah Salem (EGY)
Balance Beam	Mariam Osama Wafaei (EGY)	Caitlin Rooskrantz (RSA)	Farah Hussein (EGY)
Floor Exercise	Alia Mostafa (EGY)	Naveen Daries (RSA)	Caitlin Rooskrantz (RSA) Chahed Sakr (TUN)

== Medal table ==
=== Combined ===
Rank	Nation	Gold	Silver	Bronze	Total
1	Egypt (EGY)	18	11	7	36
2	Algeria (ALG)	7	3	5	15
3	South Africa (RSA)	2	10	7	19
4	Tunisia (TUN)	1	1	2	4
5	Morocco (MAR)	0	3	7	10
Totals (5 entries)		28	28	28	84

=== Men ===
Rank	Nation	Gold	Silver	Bronze	Total
1	Egypt (EGY)	9	9	3	21
2	Algeria (ALG)	7	3	4	14
3	Morocco (MAR)	0	3	6	9
4	Tunisia (TUN)	0	1	1	2
Totals (4 entries)		16	16	14	46

=== Women ===
Rank	Nation	Gold	Silver	Bronze	Total
1	Egypt (EGY)	9	2	4	15
2	South Africa (RSA)	2	10	7	19
3	Tunisia (TUN)	1	0	1	2
4	Algeria (ALG)	0	0	1	1
4	Morocco (MAR)	0	0	1	1
Totals (5 entries)		12	12	14	38
