= Hamza Hossaini =

Moroccan artistic gymnast

- Born: 17 November 1995 (age 30) Meknes, Morocco

Gymnastics career
- Discipline: Men's artistic gymnastics
- Country represented: Morocco
- Training location: Noisy-le-Grand, France
- Head coach: Thomas Bouhail
Medal record
Representing Morocco
Mediterranean Games
Gold medal – first place	2026 Taranto	Vault
African Championships
Gold medal – first place	2026 Yaoundé	Vault
Silver medal – second place	2016 Algiers	Vault
Silver medal – second place	2024 Marrakesh	Team
Bronze medal – third place	2016 Algiers	Team
Bronze medal – third place	2023 Pretoria	Team
Bronze medal – third place	2024 Marrakesh	Floor exercise
Bronze medal – third place	2024 Marrakesh	Rings
Bronze medal – third place	2024 Marrakesh	Vault
Bronze medal – third place	2024 Marrakesh	Parallel bars
Bronze medal – third place	2026 Yaoundé	Parallel bars
Arab Games
Gold medal – first place	2023 Oran	Vault
Silver medal – second place	2023 Oran	All-around
Silver medal – second place	2023 Oran	Floor exercise
Silver medal – second place	2023 Oran	Rings
Silver medal – second place	2023 Oran	Parallel bars

Hamza Hossaini (born 17 November 1995) is a Moroccan artistic gymnast. He is the 2026 Mediterranean Games champion and 2026 African champion on vault.

== Early and personal life ==
Hossaini was born in Meknes, Morocco in 1995. After graduating from high school, he studied sports science in Morocco. In 2017, he moved to France to further his education and began training with the Noisy-le-Grand club.

== Gymnastics career ==
Hossaini made his World Championships debut at the 2015 edition; he did not qualify for any finals. He won bronze on vault at the 2018 Paris World Challenge Cup.

In 2019, Hossaini had some misunderstandings with the Moroccan Gymnastics Federation after they began excluding him from international assignments and not paying him bonuses. In 2021, Hossaini was granted Dutch citizenship and considered switching nationalities to represent the Netherlands. He ended up working things out with the Moroccan federation and continued representing Morocco internationally.

Hossaini competed at the 2023 African Championships where he helped Morocco finish third as a team. He placed fourth in the all-around, which qualified him as an individual to the 2023 World Championships. While there, he placed twentieth on vault during the qualification round.

At the 2024 African Championships, he helped Morocco win silver as a team behind Egypt. Individually he won bronze on floor exercise, rings, vault, and parallel bars. Hossaini competed at the 2026 African Championships where he won gold on vault, bronze on parallel bars, and placed fifth in the all-around and on rings and horizontal bar and sixth on floor exercise. At the 2026 Mediterranean Games, Hossaini won gold on vault, earning Morocco its first Mediterranean Games gold in Gymnastics since Khalid Saber won the same apparatus in 1993.

== Competitive history ==
Competitive history of Hamza Hossaini
Year	Event	Team	AA	FX	PH	SR	VT	PB	HB
2015
2015	World Championships		166						
2016
2016	African Championships	3rd place, bronze medalist(s)				2nd place, silver medalist(s)			
2017	Doha World Cup			15			13		
2017	Paris World Challenge Cup						15		
2018	Mediterranean Games		16				4		
2018	Paris World Challenge Cup						3rd place, bronze medalist(s)		
2019	Doha World Cup						11		
2019	Dutch Championships		3 (Note: Hossaini received the third highest score but was ineligible for placement as he wasn't a Dutch citizen)						
2022	Dutch Championships		4	7	7			4	
2023
2023	African Championships	3rd place, bronze medalist(s)	4						
2023	Paris World Challenge Cup			18			17		
2023	World Championships						20		
2024
2024	African Championships	2nd place, silver medalist(s)	4	3rd place, bronze medalist(s)		3rd place, bronze medalist(s)	3rd place, bronze medalist(s)	3rd place, bronze medalist(s)	4
2025	Cairo World Cup							7	
2025	Paris World Challenge Cup			33					
2026	Cairo World Cup						6		
2026	African Championships		5	6		5	1st place, gold medalist(s)	3rd place, bronze medalist(s)	5
2026	Mediterranean Games		WD				1st place, gold medalist(s)	R3	
2026	Paris World Challenge Cup						5		
2026	World Championships		61						
