= Gymnastics at the 2015 African Games =

- Location: Republic of the Congo; Brazzaville
- Dates: 2–6 September

Gymnastics at the 2015 African Games in Brazzaville was held between September 2–6, 2015.

== Medal summary ==
=== Medal table ===
Rank	Nation	Gold	Silver	Bronze	Total
1	Algeria	8	4	8	20
2	South Africa	4	7	3	14
3	Egypt	3	5	2	10
4	Congo	1	0	1	2
5	Tunisia	0	0	2	2
6	Nigeria	0	0	1	1
Totals (6 entries)		16	16	17	49

== Artistic gymnastics ==
=== Results ===
Event	Gold	Silver	Bronze
Men
Team	Algeria; Hillal Metidji; Mohamed Bourguieg; Mohamed Reghib; Mohamed Aouicha; Ahmed Anis Maoudj	Egypt	Nigeria
Individual All-Around	Mohamed El-Saharty; Egypt	Mohamed Bourguieg; Algeria	Mohamed Metidji; Algeria
Pommel Horse	Mohamed Aouicha; Algeria	Mohamed El-Saharty; Egypt	Hillal Metidji; Algeria
Rings	Ali Zahran; Egypt	Ryan Patterson; South Africa	Mohamed El-Saharty; Egypt
Vault	Mohamed Bourguieg; Algeria	Ahmed Anes Maoudj; Algeria	Ngcobo Siphamandla; South Africa
Parallel Bars	Mohamed El-Saharty; Egypt	Hillal Metidji; Algeria	Tiaan Grobler; South Africa
Horizontal Bar	Mohamed Reghib; Algeria	Mohamed El-Saharty; Egypt	Mohamed Aouicha; Algeria
Women
Team	South Africa; Kirsten Beckett; Claudia Cummins; Bianca Mann; Tylah Lotter; Angela Maguire	Egypt; Ingi El Khashab; Nancy Taman; Mai Ahmed Saad; Aya Mahgoub; Maiyada Mahmoud	Algeria; Farah Boufadene; Lahna Salem; Nesrine Megroune; Fatima Mokhtari; Rania Khodja
Individual All-Around	Kirsten Beckett; South Africa	Nancy Taman; Egypt	Farah Boufadene; Algeria
Vault	Farah Boufadene; Algeria	Claudia Cummins; South Africa	Nancy Taman; Egypt
Uneven Bars	Farah Boufadene; Algeria	Kirsten Beckett; South Africa	Tylah Lotter; South Africa
Balance Beam	Kirsten Beckett; South Africa	Angela Maguire; South Africa	Farah Boufadene; Algeria

Floor exercise was not contested due to improper equipment – the rhythmic gymnastics floor was installed at the venue opposed to the artistic gymnastics floor.

== Aerobic Gymnastics ==
=== Results ===
Event	Gold	Silver	Bronze
Men's Individual	Mercia Gustany Massamba (CGO)	Wilson Mafona (RSA)	Sofiane Sahraoui (ALG)
Women's Individual	Siham Mansouri (ALG)	Dominique Mann (RSA)	Halaoui Oumayma (TUN); Saud Said Cheyma (ALG)
Mixed Pairs	Algeria; Siham Mansouri; Sofiane Sahraoui	South Africa; Dominique Mann; Wilson Mafona	Republic of the Congo; Mercia Ntsia; Delmas Moungondou
Mixed Trio	South Africa; Dominique Mann; Wilson Mafona; Happy Ledwaba	Algeria; Mediouni Soupour; Said Saoud Cheyma; Mansouri Siham	Tunisia; Dhaouadi Ameni; Lotfi Nidal; Maisa Ghazouani
