= Farah Boufadene =

Algerian artistic gymnast (born 1999)

- Nicknames: Faramineuse, Farounette
- Born: 11 March 1999 (age 27) Saint-Étienne, Frace
- Height: 1.55 m (5 ft 1 in)

Gymnastics career
- Discipline: Women's artistic gymnastics
- Country represented: Algeria (2015–2016)
- Former countries represented: France (2013–2014)
- Club: Avoine Beaumont Gymnastique
- Head coach: Gina Chirlicenco
Medal record
Women's artistic gymnastics
Representing Algeria
African Games
Gold medal – first place	2015 Brazzaville	Vault
Gold medal – first place	2015 Brazzaville	Uneven bars
Bronze medal – third place	2015 Brazzaville	Team
Bronze medal – third place	2015 Brazzaville	All-around
Bronze medal – third place	2015 Brazzaville	Balance beam

Farah Boufadene (born 11 March 1999) is an Algerian former artistic gymnast. She represented her native France until the beginning of 2015 when she switched to representing Algeria. Boufadene participated at the 2015 World Championships and qualified for 2016 Summer Olympics, where she placed 59th in the all-around in the qualifying stage of the competition. She won five medals at the 2015 All-Africa Games, including the vault and uneven bars titles.

== Early life ==
Boufadene was born on 11 March 1999, in Saint-Étienne. Her father is an immigrant from Algeria, and she has a younger brother named Ishane. She began gymnastics when she was five years old and trained in her hometown.

== Gymnastics career ==
Boufadene won the all-around title in her age group at the 2010 French Championships. She missed most of the 2013 season due to a knee injury. She returned to competition in December 2013 and tied with Ellie Downie for the bronze medal on the uneven bars at the 2013 Gymnasiade. She was injured again in February 2014 and did not compete again until November at the Elite Gym Massilia. There, she finished 15th in the open all-around competition.

Boufadene became age-eligible for senior international competitions in 2015. She injured her ankle at the 2015 French Championships in March and withdrew from the competition. In May, she requested a nationality change to Algeria, which was approved by the International Gymnastics Federation. With this decision, she also moved to Avoine to train at Avoine Beaumont Gymnastique. She made her debut for Algeria at the 2015 All-Africa Games and helped the team win the bronze medal. She also won the bronze medal in the all-around, behind Kirsten Beckett and Nancy Taman. She then won gold medals in the vault and uneven bars finals, and another bronze medal in the balance beam final.

Boufadene competed at the 2015 World Championships and finished 70th in the all-around during the qualification round with a total score of 51.965. As the highest finisher from an African country, she received a guaranteed berth to the 2016 Summer Olympics for continental representation.

The Algerian Olympic Committee granted her a scholarship to train at Gym-Richelieu in Quebec from January to August 2016. She injured her back at the 2016 African Championship on the vault. As a result, she withdrew from the 2016 Olympic Test Event. Despite still being injured, she represented Algeria at the 2016 Summer Olympics and was the country's youngest athlete. She became the first female artistic gymnast to compete for Algeria at the Olympic Games. She finished 59th in the all-around during the qualification round and did not advance into any finals.
