= Omar Mohamed (gymnast) =

Egyptian artistic gymnast (born 1999)

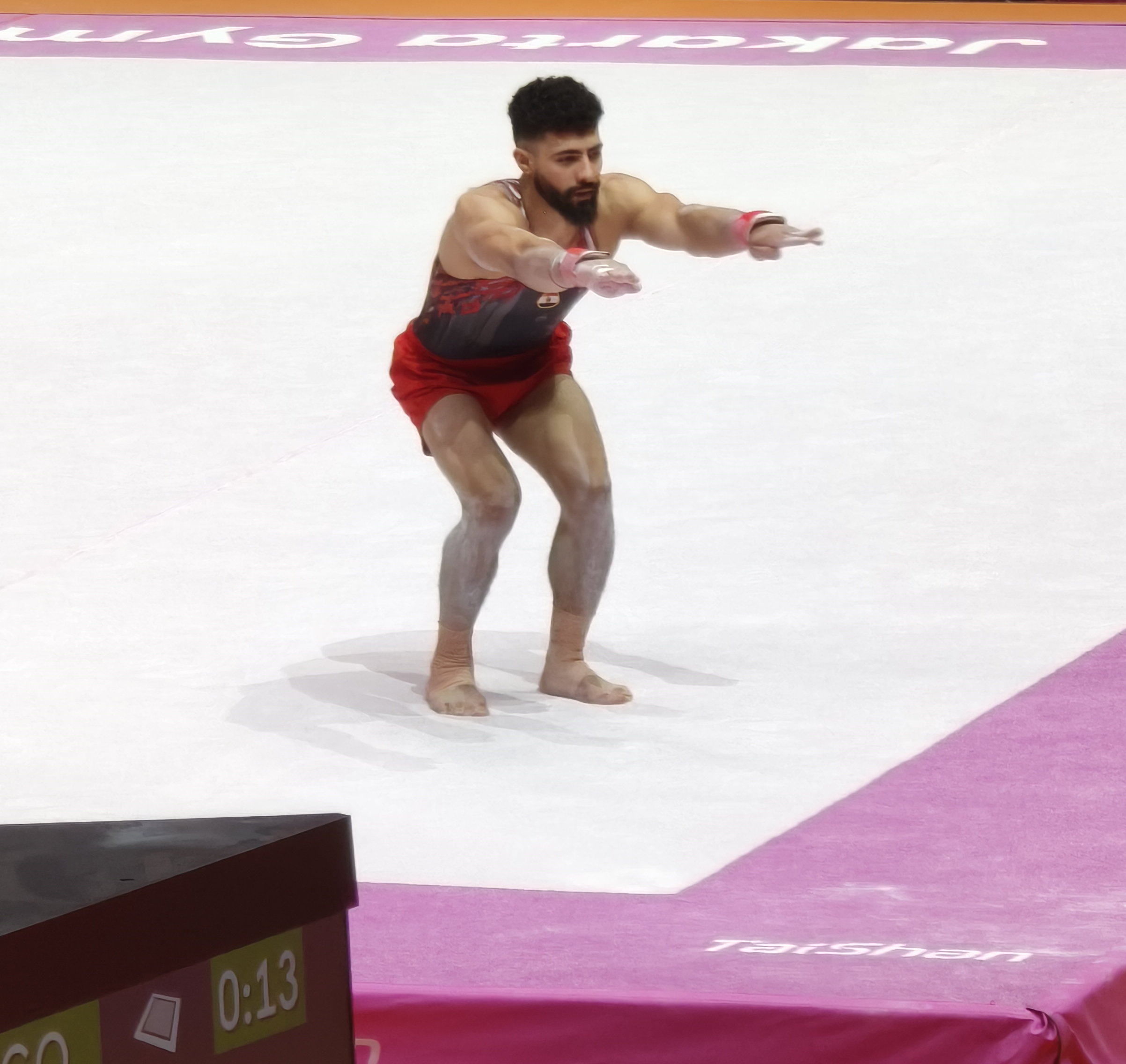
- Mohamed at 2025 World Championships

Personal information
- Full name: Omar Mohamed Fathy
- Born: 10 February 1999 (age 27) Alexandria, Egypt

Gymnastics career
- Discipline: Men's artistic gymnastics
- Country represented: Egypt
- Club: Alexandria Sporting Club
Medal record
Representing Egypt
Mediterranean Games
Bronze medal – third place	2026 Taranto	All-around
Bronze medal – third place	2026 Taranto	Rings
African Championships
Gold medal – first place	2018 Swakopmund	All-around
Gold medal – first place	2018 Swakopmund	Floor exercise
Gold medal – first place	2021 Cairo	All-around
Gold medal – first place	2022 Cairo	Team
Gold medal – first place	2022 Cairo	Rings
Gold medal – first place	2022 Cairo	Vault
Gold medal – first place	2022 Cairo	Parallel bars
Gold medal – first place	2023 Pretoria	Team
Gold medal – first place	2023 Pretoria	All-around
Gold medal – first place	2024 Marrakesh	Team
Gold medal – first place	2024 Marrakesh	All-around
Gold medal – first place	2026 Yaoundé	Team
Gold medal – first place	2026 Yaoundé	All-around
Gold medal – first place	2026 Yaoundé	Rings
Gold medal – first place	2026 Yaoundé	Parallel bars
Gold medal – first place	2026 Yaoundé	Horizontal bar
Silver medal – second place	2018 Swakopmund	Team
Silver medal – second place	2018 Swakopmund	Vault
Silver medal – second place	2022 Cairo	All-around
Silver medal – second place	2024 Marrakesh	Floor exercise
Silver medal – second place	2024 Marrakesh	Rings
Silver medal – second place	2024 Marrakesh	Vault
Silver medal – second place	2024 Marrakesh	Parallel bars
Silver medal – second place	2024 Marrakesh	Horizontal bar
Bronze medal – third place	2018 Swakopmund	Parallel bars

Omar Mohamed Fathy (Arabic: عمرو محمد فتحي, born 10 February 1999) is an Egyptian artistic gymnast. He is a five-time African all-around champion (2018, 2021, 2023, 2024, 2026), the 2026 Mediterranean Games all-around bronze medalist, and he competed at the 2020 and 2024 Olympic Games.

== Gymnastics career ==
=== 2017–2018 ===
Mohamed made his World Championships debut in 2017 and finished 59th in the all-around during the qualification round.

Mohamed competed at the 2018 Stella Zakharova Cup and finished fourth on the pommel horse, fifth on the vault, and sixth on the parallel bars. He won the all-around gold medal at the 2018 African Championships, and the Egyptian team won the silver medal behind Algeria. In the event finals, he won gold on the floor exercise, silver on the vault, and bronze on the parallel bars. He then represented Egypt at the 2018 Mediterranean Games, finished seventh with his teammates.

=== 2019–2021 ===
At the 2019 Voronin Cup, Mohamed won a silver medal on the parallel bars and placed fourth on the horizontal bar.

Mohamed finished seventh in the parallel bars final at the 2021 Cairo World Challenge Cup. Then at the Doha World Cup, he finished eighth in the horizontal bar final. He won the all-around title at the 2021 African Championships and earned a continental berth for the Olympic Games. He then competed at the 2020 Summer Olympics. He finished 51st in the all-around during the qualification round. After the Olympics, he competed at the 2021 World Championships on floor exercise, rings, parallel bars, and horizontal bar, but he did not advance to any finals.

=== 2022 ===
At the Cairo World Cup, Mohamed finished sixth on the floor exercise and eighth on the vault. He then competed at the 2022 Mediterranean Games where Egypt finished fifth in the team competition. He qualified for the all-around final and finished in fourth place, only 0.200 behind bronze medalist Marios Georgiou.

At the African Championships in Cairo, Mohamed won a silver medal in the all-around behind teammate Mohamed Afify. He also won a gold medal in the team event. Then in the event finals, he won gold medals in the floor exercise, rings, vault, and parallel bars. He then finished fifth in the vault final at the Paris World Challenge Cup. At the World Championships, he finished 26th in the all-around during the qualification round, making him the second reserve for the final.

=== 2023 ===
Mohamed finished eighth in the vault final at the Cairo World Cup. He then won the all-around title by over three points at the 2023 African Championships, and he also won a gold medal with his teammates. Then at the RomGym Trophy, he won the gold medal in the vault final and finished ninth in the all-around. He competed at the 2023 World Championships, finishing 37th in the all-around during the qualification round.

=== 2024 ===
Mohamed finished fifth in the rings final at the Baku World Cup. He then finished eighth on the rings at the Doha World Cup. At the 2024 African Championships, he won the all-around title and earned the continental berth for the upcoming Olympic Games. In the event finals, he won silver medals on the floor exercise, rings, vault, parallel bars, and horizontal bar. In August, he competed at the Pharaoh's Cup in Cairo and won gold on the floor exercise and parallel bars and silver on the rings, horizontal bar, and vault. Then at the RomGym Trophy in Bucharest, he won the all-around bronze medal behind Canadians Félix Dolci and René Cournoyer. In the event finals, he won gold on the vault, silver on the floor exercise and pommel horse, and bronze on the rings and horizontal bar. At the 2024 Summer Olympics, he finished 40th in the all-around during the qualification round.

=== 2025–2026 ===
Mohamed competed at the 2025 Cairo World Cup where he won gold on parallel bars and bronze on rings. At the 2025 World Championships, Mohamed made history as he became the first Egyptian man to qualify to a World all-around final, where he ultimately finished 23rd. In doing so, Mohamed became the first Egyptian male gymnast in 24 years to reach a World final, with the last being Walid El Dariny who reached the rings final in 2001.

At the 2026 African Championships, Mohamed won his fifth African all-around title.
