= Adam Cogat =

French-Algerian artistic gymnast

- Born: 10 January 2003 (age 23) Levallois-Perret, France

Gymnastics career
- Discipline: Men's artistic gymnastics
- Country represented: Algeria; (2024–present)
- Former countries represented: France (2018–2023)
- Club: Gym Agrès Vélizy
Medal record
Representing Algeria
African Championships
Silver medal – second place	2026 Yaoundé	Team
Silver medal – second place	2026 Yaoundé	Floor exercise
Silver medal – second place	2026 Yaoundé	Parallel bars
Silver medal – second place	2026 Yaoundé	Horizontal bar
Bronze medal – third place	2026 Yaoundé	All-around

Adam Cogat (born 10 January 2003) is a French-Algerian artistic gymnast currently representing Algeria in international competition. He was a five-time medalist at the 2026 African Championships. Representing France, he was a three-time medalist at the 2019 Junior Mediterranean Championships.

== Early life ==
Cogat was born in Levallois-Perret, France, to a French father and an Algerian mother.

== Gymnastics career ==
=== 2018–2023: Representing France ===
At the 2018 French Championships, Cogat placed fourth in the all-around in the under-16 division. At the 2019 Junior Mediterranean Championships, Cogat helped France finish fourth as a team. Individually he won silver on floor exercise and bronze on vault and horizontal bar. Cogat became age-eligible for senior level competition in 2021; however he never called up to compete for the French senior national team.

=== 2024–present: Representing Algeria ===
In 2024, Cogat officially decided to represent Algeria in international competition after seeing the success of fellow Franco-Algerian gymnast Kaylia Nemour. Cogat made his debut for Algeria at the RomGym Trophy where he placed fourth in the all-around. Cogat was hoping to qualify for the 2024 Olympic Games; however when Algeria boycotted the 2024 African Championships, he was unable to qualify.

Cogat competed at various World Cups in 2025, with his best finish being seventh on floor exercise in Cairo. He made his World Championships debut in 2025, where he finished 47th during all-around qualifications and did not qualify for any event finals.

At the 2026 African Championships, Cogat helped Algeria win silver as a team. Individually he won bronze in the all-around and silver on floor exercise, parallel bars, and horizontal bar. In winning the bronze medal in the all-around, Cogat qualified to compete at the 2026 World Championships.

== Competitive history ==
Competitive history of Adam Cogat representing France
Year	Event	Team	AA	FX	PH	SR	VT	PB	HB
2018	French Championships (U16)		4						
2019	French Championships (U16)		11						
2019	Mediterranean Championships	4	9	2nd place, silver medalist(s)	4	5	3rd place, bronze medalist(s)		3rd place, bronze medalist(s)
2021	French Championships (U18)		5				6		
2022	French Championships		16						
2023	French Championships		16						
2024	French Championships		5						

Competitive history of Adam Cogat representing Algeria
Year	Event	Team	AA	FX	PH	SR	VT	PB	HB
2024	RomGym Trophy		4	6	5	8		6	6
2025	Antalya World Cup			11	19				18
2025	Cairo World Cup			7					
2025	Paris World Challenge Cup			34	16			28	32
2025	World Championships		47						
2026	Antalya World Cup			36	14			17	24
2026	African Championships	2nd place, silver medalist(s)	3rd place, bronze medalist(s)	2nd place, silver medalist(s)				2nd place, silver medalist(s)	2nd place, silver medalist(s)
2026	Mediterranean Games	8	13						
2026	World Championships		74						
