= 2021 African Artistic Gymnastics Championships =

Artistic Gymnastics Championship

African Artistic Gymnastics Championships
- Venue: Nasr City Sporting Club
- Location: Cairo, Egypt
- Date: May 26–27, 2021
- Competitors: 28 from 7 nations

The 2021 African Artistic Gymnastics Championships took place on May 26–27 in Cairo, Egypt. It served as an Olympic qualification event for four individual Olympic berths.

== Medal winners ==
Event	Gold	Silver	Bronze
Men
All-around	Omar Mohamed (EGY)	Ziad Khater (EGY)	Uche Eke (NGR)
Women
All-around	Zeina Ibrahim (EGY)	Farah Hussein (EGY)	Naveen Daries (RSA)

== Olympic berths ==
Egyptian athletes Omar Mohamed and Zeina Ibrahim won the competition and qualified for the 2020 Olympic Games. Although athletes from Egypt finished top two for both men and women, they could only earn one Olympic berth for each. As a result, Uche Eke of Nigeria and Naveen Daries of South Africa also qualified for the Olympic Games. In doing so, Eke became the first gymnast from Nigeria to qualify for the Olympic Games and Mohamed became the first Egyptian male.

== Results ==
=== Women's all-around ===
Rank	Gymnast	Vault (gymnastics)	Uneven bars	Balance beam	Floor (gymnastics)	Total
1st place, gold medalist(s)	(Egypt) Zeina Ibrahim	13.200	12.050	13.150	11.800	50.200
2nd place, silver medalist(s)	(Egypt) Farah Hussein	11.700	12.050	12.950	11.700	48.400
–	(Egypt) Jana Mahmoud	12.050	11.900	11.450	11.850	47.250
3rd place, bronze medalist(s)	(South Africa) Naveen Daries	12.100	10.900	10.800	10.050	43.850
4	(Algeria) Fatima Ahlem Mokhtari	12.350	9.050	10.900	10.350	42.650
5	(South Africa) Mammule Rankoe	11.500	10.350	9.800	10.050	41.700
–	(South Africa) Zelmé Daries	10.750	9.750	9.100	11.200	40.800
6	(Algeria) Lahna Salem	12.650	9.700	9.150	8.550	40.050
–	(Algeria) Chama Temmami	11.800	9.200	7.500	10.750	39.250
7	(Cameroon) Ajara Petsadjui	10.200	0.000	3.350	4.950	18.500
8	(Cameroon) Lisa Mebar	9.550	0.000	0.000	5.800	15.350
–	(Cameroon) Celestine Nanga Ntyo’o	0.000	0.000	2.050	5.300	7.350

=== Men's all-around ===
Rank	Gymnast	Floor (gymnastics)	Pommel horse	Rings (gymnastics)	Vault (gymnastics)	Parallel bars	Horizontal bar	Total
1st place, gold medalist(s)	(Egypt) Omar Mohamed	13.650	13.000	13.450	14.350	14.000	13.300	81.750
2nd place, silver medalist(s)	(Egypt) Ziad Khater	12.350	13.650	13.000	13.550	13.400	12.100	78.050
3rd place, bronze medalist(s)	(Nigeria) Uche Eke	12.350	13.500	11.300	13.700	12.450	12.650	75.950
–	(Egypt) Abdelrahman Abdelhaleem	11.050	13.850	12.200	13.950	12.350	12.500	75.900
4	(Algeria) Mohamed Aouicha	11.850	13.200	11.400	12.800	12.700	11.950	73.900
5	(Morocco) Abderrazak Nasser	11.800	13.200	11.550	13.750	10.600	11.850	72.750
6	(South Africa) Aidan Maguire	11.300	12.250	11.150	13.800	11.050	12.150	71.700
7	(Algeria) Hillal Metidji	10.350	11.650	11.700	12.900	12.900	12.150	71.650
8	(South Africa) Muhammad Mia	11.550	11.600	10.500	12.650	12.500	11.650	70.450
9	(Morocco) Nabil Zouhair	11.050	10.750	10.950	12.900	11.850	11.400	68.900
–	(Morocco) Mehdi Tougui	10.800	11.700	6.650	13.050	9.900	11.050	63.150
–	(Algeria) Mohamed Bourguieg	–	11.900	11.200	13.600	–	–	36.700
10	(Cameroon) Samuel Paulson	7.250	-0.050	7.750	9.450	8.550	–	32.950
11	(Cameroon) Geremi Softokam	8.250	–	5.600	12.150	6.800	–	32.800
–	(Cameroon) Pascal Meyong	8.100	–	–	10.350	–	–	18.450
12	(Libya) Asharaf Awn	–	–	2.750	10.400	–	4.750	17.900
