= Mohamed Afify =

Egyptian artistic gymnast

- محمد عفيفي
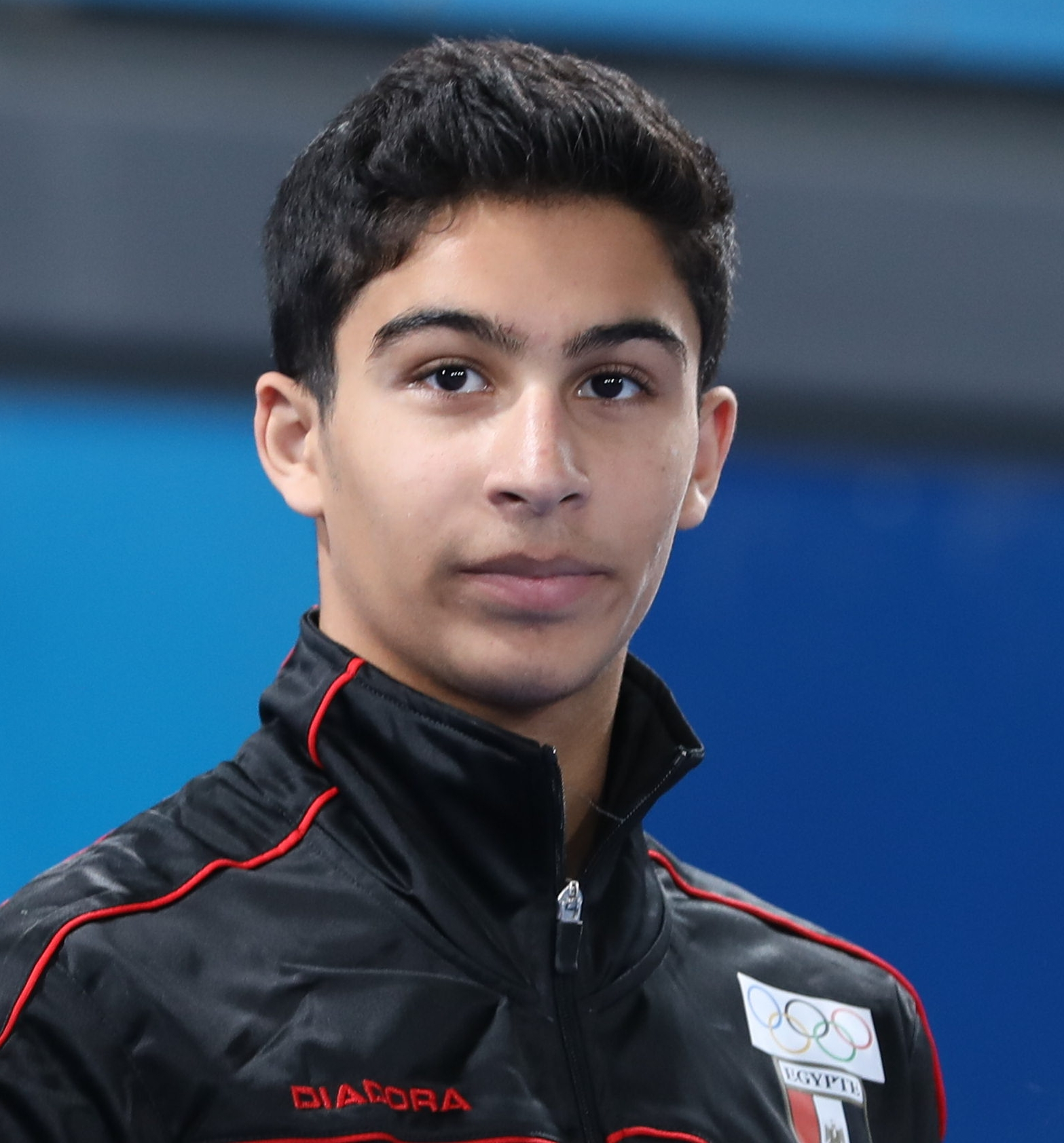
- Afify at the 2018 Youth Olympics

Personal information
- Full name: Mohamed Afify
- Born: 10 November 2001 (age 24) Alexandria, Egypt

Gymnastics career
- Discipline: Men's artistic gymnastics
- Country represented: Egypt; (2018–present)
- Club: Alexandria Sporting Club
- Head coach: Arafat Ahmed
Medal record
Representing Egypt
African Games
| Silver medal – second place | 2019 Rabat | Team |
African Championships
| Gold medal – first place | 2022 Cairo | Team |
| Gold medal – first place | 2022 Cairo | All-around |
| Gold medal – first place | 2022 Cairo | Horizontal bar |
| Gold medal – first place | 2023 Pretoria | Team |
| Gold medal – first place | 2024 Marrakesh | Team |
| Gold medal – first place | 2024 Marrakesh | Parallel bars |
| Gold medal – first place | 2026 Yaoundé | Team |
| Gold medal – first place | 2026 Yaoundé | Pommel horse |
| Silver medal – second place | 2022 Cairo | Rings |
| Silver medal – second place | 2023 Pretoria | All-around |
| Silver medal – second place | 2024 Marrakesh | All-around |
| Silver medal – second place | 2024 Marrakesh | Pommel Horse |
| Silver medal – second place | 2026 Yaoundé | All-around |
| Bronze medal – third place | 2022 Cairo | Parallel bars |
| Bronze medal – third place | 2026 Yaoundé | Floor exercise |
FIG World Cup
Event / 1st / 2nd / 3rd; Apparatus World Cup / 0 / 2 / 0
Representing (International Olympic Committee) Mixed-NOCs
Youth Olympic Games
| Bronze medal – third place | 2018 Buenos Aires | Mixed team |

Mohamed Afify (Arabic: محمد عفيفي, born November 10, 2001) is an Egyptian artistic gymnast. He is the 2022 African champion. Additionally, he represented Egypt at the 2018 Youth Olympic Games.

== Early life ==
Afify was born in Alexandria, Egypt in 2001.

== Gymnastics career ==
=== 2018 ===
Afify competed at the 2018 Junior African Championships where he helped Egypt place first as a team; individually, he placed first in the all-around and on four of the six apparatuses. He was later selected to represent Egypt at the 2018 Youth Olympic Games. Although he did not qualify for any individual finals, he won the bronze medal in the mixed multi-discipline team event.

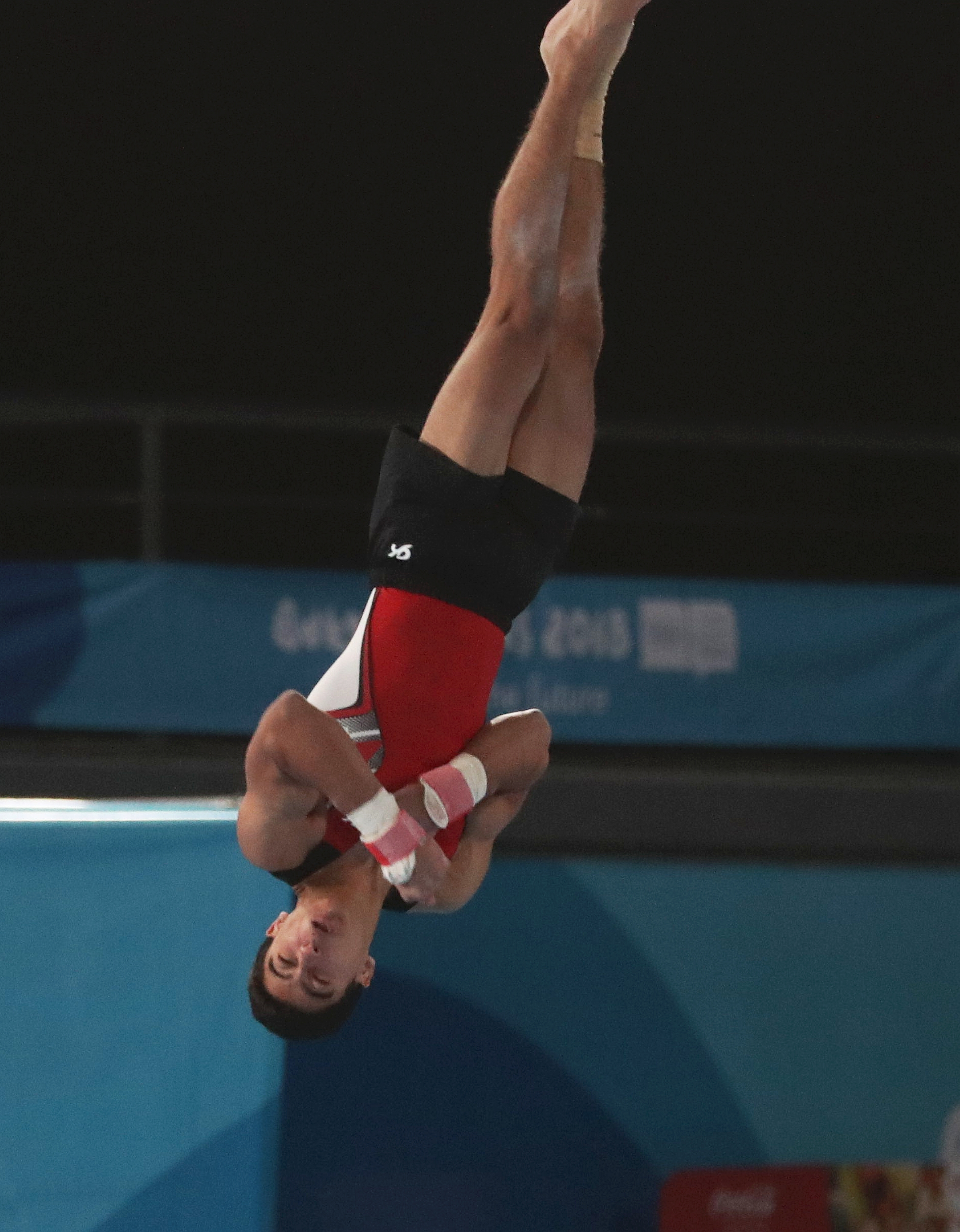
Floor exercise

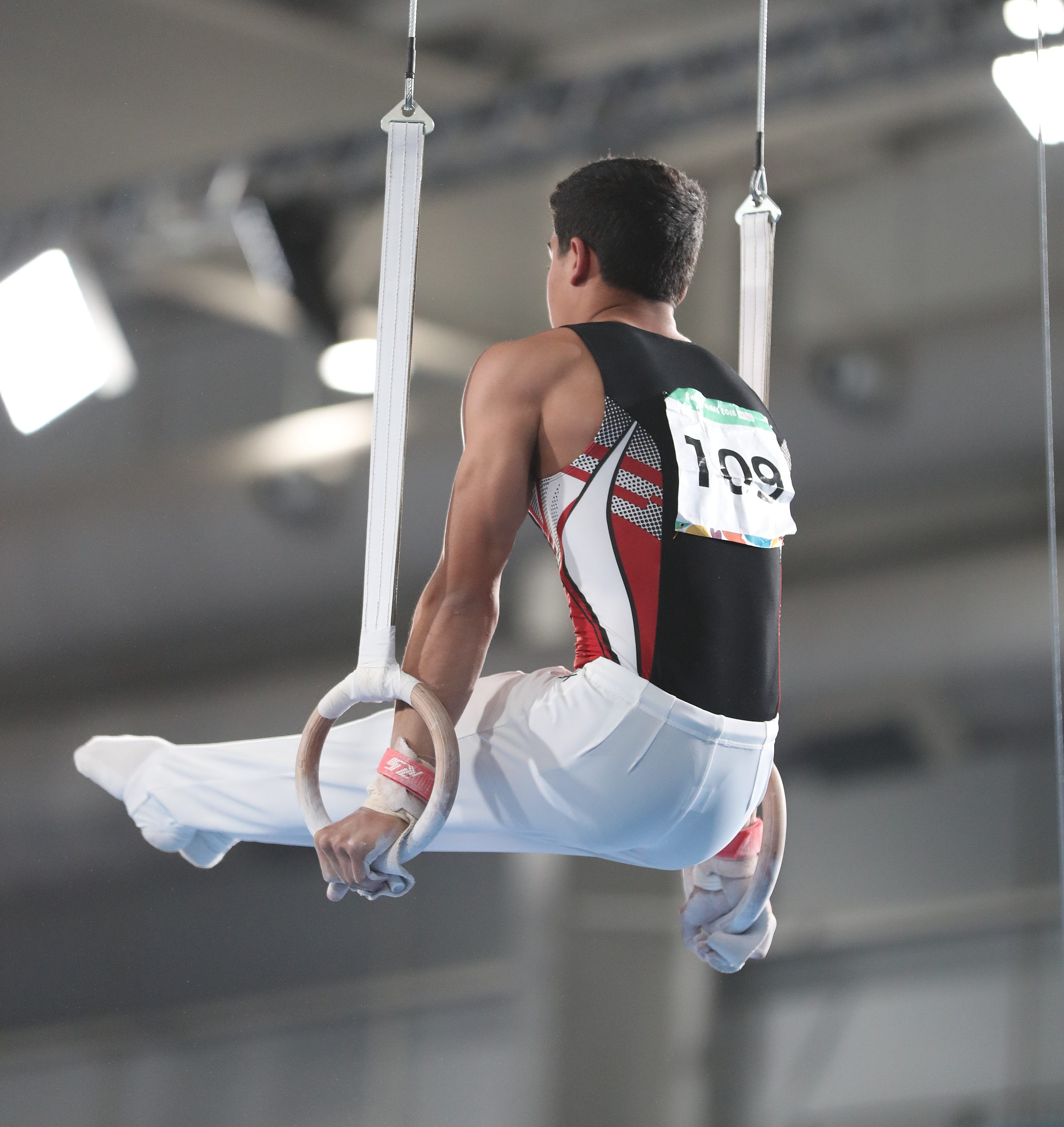
Rings

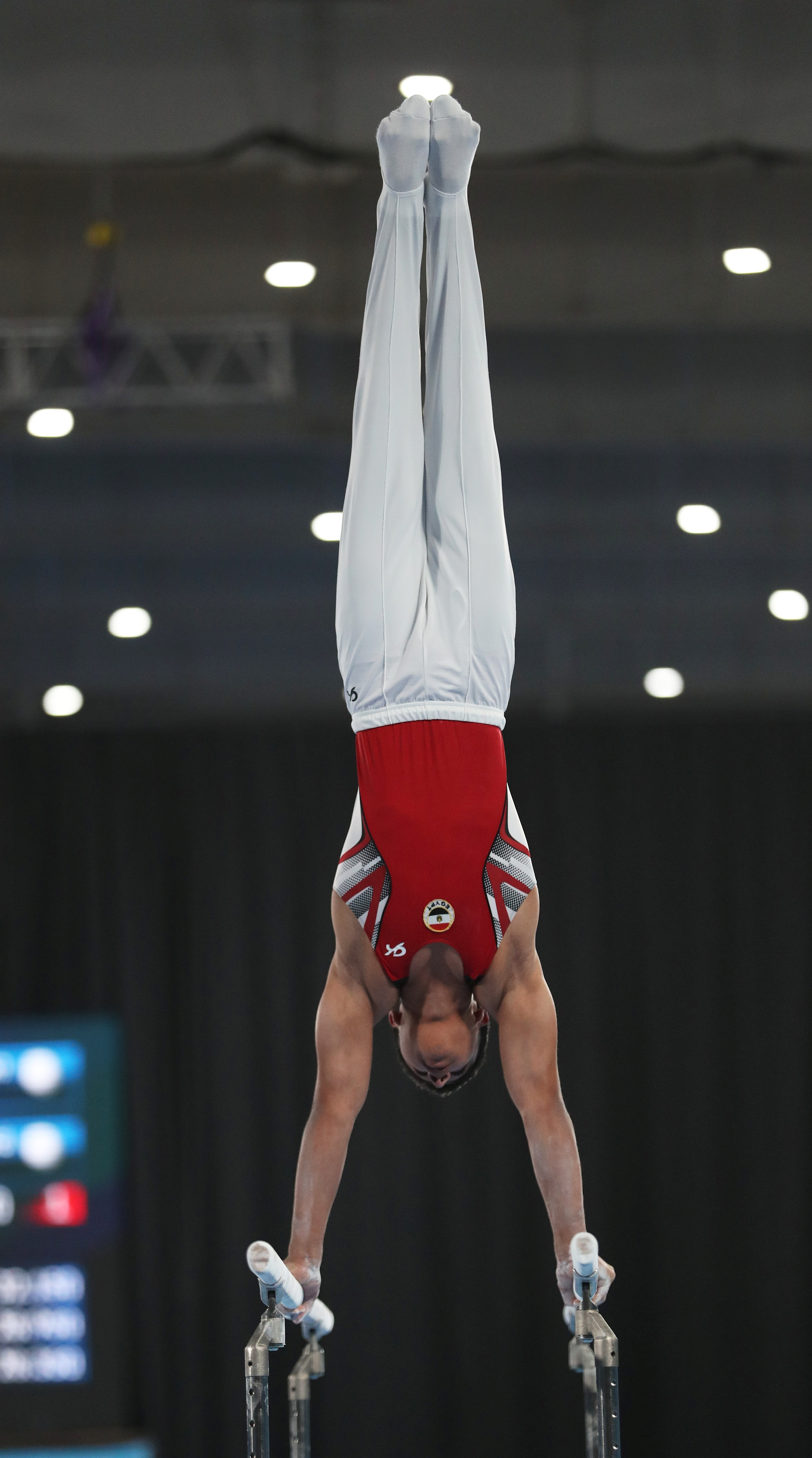
Parallel bars

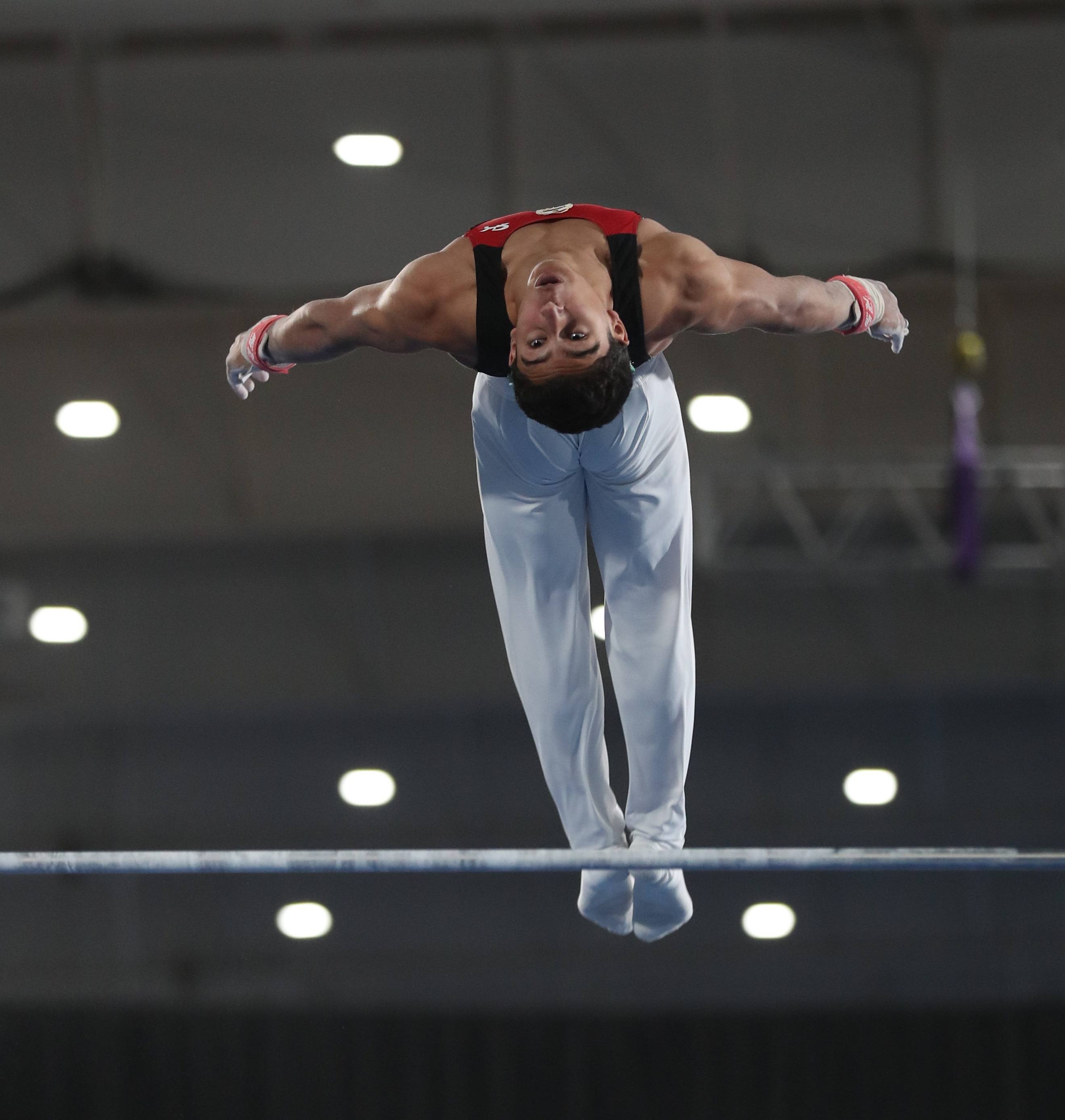
Horizontal bar

Afify at the 2018 Youth Olympics

=== 2019 ===
Afify became age-eligible for senior competition in 2019. He competed at the 2019 African Games where he helped Egypt win the silver medal behind Algeria. Individually, he placed fourth in the all-around. Afify competed at his first ever World Championships in 2019. During qualifications, he placed 90th in the all-around.

=== 2020–22 ===
The majority of competitions were canceled or postponed in 2020 due to the global COVID-19 pandemic. Afify returned to competition at the Cairo World Cup where he was second reserve for the parallel bars final. In October, he competed at the 2021 World Championships; he only competed on four events and was ranked 46th on parallel bars.

In 2022, Afify competed at the African Championships where he became the African all-around champion. Additionally he won gold on horizontal bar and in the team final. At the 2022 World Championships Afify finished 27th in the all-around during qualifications was the third reserve for the final.

=== 2023 ===
Afify competed at various World Cups throughout early 2023. At the Cairo World Cup, he won silver on parallel bars behind Illia Kovtun. Afify next competed at the 2023 African Championships where he helped Egypt place first as a team; individually he won silver in the all-around behind compatriot Omar Mohamed. Afify ended the year competing at the 2023 World Championships where he finished 50th in qualifications.

=== 2024 ===
Afify competed at the World Cups in Cairo and Baku. At the African Championships, he helped Egypt finish first as a team, and individually he won silver in the all-around and on pommel horse and gold on the parallel bars.

== Competitive history ==
Competitive history of Mohamed Afify
| Year | Event | Team | AA | FX | PH | SR | VT | PB | HB |
|---|---|---|---|---|---|---|---|---|---|
| 2018 | Stella Zakharova Cup | 10 | 11 | 3rd place, bronze medalist(s) | | 5 | | 1st place, gold medalist(s) | 3rd place, bronze medalist(s) |
| 2018 | Junior African Championships | 1st place, gold medalist(s) | 1st place, gold medalist(s) | | 1st place, gold medalist(s) | 1st place, gold medalist(s) | | 1st place, gold medalist(s) | 1st place, gold medalist(s) |
| 2018 | Youth Olympic Games | (bronze) (Note: The teams were randomly assigned with gymnasts from different countries and disciplines) | | | | | | | |
2019
| 2019 | African Games | 2nd place, silver medalist(s) | 4 | | | | | 5 | 5 |
| 2019 | World Championships | | 90 | | | | | | |
2021
| 2021 | World Championships | | | | | | | 46 | |
2022
| 2022 | African Championships | 1st place, gold medalist(s) | 1st place, gold medalist(s) | 7 | | 2nd place, silver medalist(s) | | 3rd place, bronze medalist(s) | 1st place, gold medalist(s) |
| 2022 | World Championships | | R3 | | | | | | |
| 2023 | Baku World Cup | | | | | | | 4 | |
| 2023 | Cairo World Cup | | | | | | | 2nd place, silver medalist(s) | |
| 2023 | African Championships | 1st place, gold medalist(s) | 2nd place, silver medalist(s) | | | | | | |
| 2023 | World Championships | | 50 | | | | | | |
| 2024 | Cairo World Cup | | | | | | | 10 | |
| 2024 | Baku World Cup | | | | | | | 6 | |
| 2024 | African Championships | 1st place, gold medalist(s) | 2nd place, silver medalist(s) | | 2nd place, silver medalist(s) | | | 1st place, gold medalist(s) | |
| 2025 | Cairo World Cup | | | | | | | 4 | |
| 2025 | World University Games | | | | | | | 8 | |
| 2026 | Cairo World Cup | | | | | | | 2nd place, silver medalist(s) | |
| 2026 | African Championships | 1st place, gold medalist(s) | 2nd place, silver medalist(s) | 3rd place, bronze medalist(s) | 1st place, gold medalist(s) | | | | |
| 2026 | Mediterranean Games | 7 | 11 | | | | | | |
| 2026 | World Championships | 23 | | | | | | | |
