= Caitlin Rooskrantz =

South African artistic gymnast

- Full name: Caitlin Aileen Rooskrantz
- Nickname: Caits
- Born: 5 November 2001 (age 25) Johannesburg, South Africa

Gymnastics career
- Discipline: Women's artistic gymnastics
- Country represented: South Africa; (2015–present)
- Club: Johannesburg Gymnastics Centre
- Head coach: Ilse Roets-Pelser
Medal record
Representing South Africa
Commonwealth Games
| Bronze medal – third place | 2022 Birmingham | Uneven bars |
African Championships
| Gold medal – first place | 2018 Swakopmund | Uneven bars |
| Gold medal – first place | 2022 Cairo | All-around |
| Gold medal – first place | 2022 Cairo | Uneven bars |
| Gold medal – first place | 2023 Pretoria | Team |
| Silver medal – second place | 2018 Swakopmund | Team |
| Silver medal – second place | 2022 Cairo | Team |
| Silver medal – second place | 2023 Pretoria | All-around |
| Silver medal – second place | 2026 Yaoundé | Team |
| Silver medal – second place | 2026 Yaoundé | All-around |
| Silver medal – second place | 2026 Yaoundé | Uneven bars |
| Bronze medal – third place | 2022 Cairo | Balance beam |
FIG World Cup
| Event | 1st | 2nd | 3rd |
|---|---|---|---|
| Apparatus World Cup | 1 | 0 | 0 |
| World Challenge Cup | 1 | 1 | 0 |
| Total | 2 | 1 | 0 |

Caitlin Aileen Rooskrantz (born 5 November 2001) is a South African artistic gymnast. She represented South Africa at the 2020 Summer Olympics and was the first South African gymnast to qualify for the Olympics without a continental quota. Rooskrantz and teammate Naveen Daries became the first female gymnasts of color to represent South Africa at the Olympics. She is the 2022 Commonwealth Games uneven bars bronze medalist, South Africa's first gymnastics medal at the Commonwealth Games since 2010. She is the 2022 African all-around champion and a two-time African uneven bars champion (2018, 2022). She is a two-time uneven bars gold medalist on the FIG World Cup series. She represented South Africa at the 2024 Summer Olympics, where she was the flag bearer of her country along with the male sprinter Akani Simbine.

== Career ==
Rooskrantz trains at the Johannesburg Gymnastics Centre, and started gymnastics at the age of eight.

=== Junior ===
At the 2015 South African Championships, Rooskrantz won gold on uneven bars, silver on balance beam and floor exercise, and bronze in the all-around. She made her international debut at the 2015 Top Gym Tournament in Belgium, placing ninth in the all-around and sixth on the uneven bars and balance beam.

Rooskrantz began the 2016 season at the Austrian Team Open where she helped the South African team finish seventh. She came second in the junior all-around event at the African Championships. She nearly swept the gold medals at the 2016 South African Championships but finished second on the balance beam to Naveen Daries. At the 2016 Junior Commonwealth Games in Namibia, she won silver medals in the all-around, uneven bars, and team events and a bronze medal on the balance beam.

=== Senior ===
==== 2017–2018 ====
Rooskrantz became age-eligible for senior competitions in 2017. She made her senior debut at the 2017 Koper Challenge Cup, finishing fifth on the uneven bars. She missed the rest of the season due to a knee dislocation that required surgery. She was not selected for the 2018 Commonwealth Games due to fitness concerns.

Rooskrantz returned to competition at the 2018 African Championships and won the uneven bars title while helping the South African team finish second to Egypt. At the Africa Safari International, she won the bronze medal on the uneven bars. She then won the all-around title at the South African Championships. As a result of her national championship win, she qualified for the 2018 World Artistic Gymnastics Championships in Doha, Qatar. There, she finished 59th in the all-around during the qualification round.

==== 2019–2021 ====
Rooskrantz began the 2019 season by winning the uneven bars title at the South African Championships. She then won the uneven bars gold medal Szombathely World Challenge Cup. This made her the first South African to win a medal at an international gymnastics competition. At the 2019 World Championship, she finished 68th in the all-around and qualified for the 2020 Summer Olympics. She was the fourth South African artistic gymnast to qualify for the Olympics since South African re-introduction in 1992 and the first since Zandre Labuschagne in 2004. Rooskrantz was one of the first person of colour artistic gymnasts to represent South Africa, along with Naveen Daries, who also competed at the 2020 Olympic Games.

Rooskrantz finished seventh on the uneven bars during the qualification round of the 2020 Baku World Cup. However, the event finals were canceled due to the COVID-19 pandemic. As the 2020 Summer Olympics were delayed due to the COVID-19 pandemic, Rooskrantz livestreamed the routine that she would have performed at the Games in August 2020. She finished 61st in the qualifying stage of 2020 Olympic Games and did not qualify for any finals. Her score at the Games was a personal best.

==== 2022 ====
Rooskrantz won a gold medal on the uneven bars at the Cairo World Cup. She also won the uneven bars event at the African Championships. She also won the African all-around title and qualified for the upcoming World Championships. Then at the 2022 Commonwealth Games, she won the bronze medal on the uneven bars. She was the second South African female gymnast to win a medal at the Commonwealth Games. She finished ninth in the all-around final, and she was part of the South African team that finished fourth. She finished 47th in the all-around during the qualification round of the World Championships.

==== 2023 ====
Rooskrantz won the all-around and uneven bars titles at the South African Championships. She then helped South Africa win the African Championships team title for the first time since 2006 and qualify for the World Championships, and she finished second in the all-around to Kaylia Nemour. At the Paris World Challenge Cup, she finished fourth in the uneven bars final. Then at the World Championships, she finished 46th in the all-around during the qualification round, securing qualification for her second Olympic Games.

==== 2024 ====
Rooskrantz began the season at the South African Championships and finished second in the all-around. In the event finals, she won gold on the uneven bars and balance beam and silver on the floor exercise. She then finished eighth on the uneven bars at the Antalya World Challenge Cup. At the 2024 Olympics, she placed 25th on uneven bars, and 73rd on both balance beam and floor exercise.She however had to withdraw without finishing due to an ankle injury she suffered during her floor exercise routine.

== Personal life ==
Rooskrantz attended Parktown High School for Girls. She had planned to have a gap year to focus on competing at the Olympics, though those plans were changed due to the COVID-19 pandemic. In 2022, she enrolled in the University of Johannesburg and began studying marketing management, which she successfully completed at the end of 2024, graduating in 2025. She comes from an athletic family: her father played football, and her older brother was involved in field hockey and cricket. Her father died when she was eight. Her mother gave up working full-time as a nurse to support Rooskrantz's gymnastics career.

== Competitive history ==
Competitive history of Caitlin Rooskrantz at the junior level
| Year | Event | Team | AA | VT | UB | BB | FX |
|---|---|---|---|---|---|---|---|
| 2015 | South African Championships | | 3rd place, bronze medalist(s) | | 1st place, gold medalist(s) | 2nd place, silver medalist(s) | 2nd place, silver medalist(s) |
| 2015 | Top Gym Tournament | | 9 | | 6 | 6 | |
| 2016 | Austrian Team Open | 7 | 19 | | | | |
| 2016 | African Championships | 2nd place, silver medalist(s) | 2nd place, silver medalist(s) | | 1st place, gold medalist(s) | 2nd place, silver medalist(s) | 3rd place, bronze medalist(s) |
| 2016 | South African Championships | | 1st place, gold medalist(s) | 1st place, gold medalist(s) | 1st place, gold medalist(s) | 2nd place, silver medalist(s) | 1st place, gold medalist(s) |
| 2016 | Junior Commonwealth Championships | 2nd place, silver medalist(s) | 2nd place, silver medalist(s) | 2nd place, silver medalist(s) | 3rd place, bronze medalist(s) | 6 | 5 |

Competitive history of Caitlin Rooskrantz at the senior level
| Year | Event | Team | AA | VT | UB | BB | FX |
|---|---|---|---|---|---|---|---|
| 2017 | Koper World Challenge Cup | | | | 5 | | |
2018
| 2018 | African Championships | 2nd place, silver medalist(s) | | | 1st place, gold medalist(s) | | |
| 2018 | Africa Safari International | 3rd place, bronze medalist(s) | | | 3rd place, bronze medalist(s) | 5 | |
| 2018 | South African Championships | | 1st place, gold medalist(s) | | 1st place, gold medalist(s) | 1st place, gold medalist(s) | 4 |
| 2018 | World Championships | | 59 | | | | |
| 2019 | South African Championships | | | | 1st place, gold medalist(s) | | |
| 2019 | Szombathely World Challenge Cup | | | | 1st place, gold medalist(s) | | |
| 2019 | World Championships | | 68 | | | | |
| 2020 | Baku World Cup | | | | 7 | | |
2021
| 2021 | Olympic Games | | 61 | | | | |
| 2022 | Cairo World Cup | | | | 1st place, gold medalist(s) | 6 | |
| 2022 | African Championships | 2nd place, silver medalist(s) | 1st place, gold medalist(s) | | 1st place, gold medalist(s) | 3rd place, bronze medalist(s) | |
| 2022 | Commonwealth Games | 4 | 9 | | 3rd place, bronze medalist(s) | | |
| 2022 | World Championships | | 47 | | | | |
| 2023 | South African Championships | | 1st place, gold medalist(s) | | 1st place, gold medalist(s) | 2nd place, silver medalist(s) | |
| 2023 | African Championships | 1st place, gold medalist(s) | 2nd place, silver medalist(s) | | | | |
| 2023 | Paris World Challenge Cup | | | | 4 | | |
| 2023 | World Championships | 19 | 46 | | | | |
| 2024 | South African Championships | | 2nd place, silver medalist(s) | | 1st place, gold medalist(s) | 1st place, gold medalist(s) | 2nd place, silver medalist(s) |
| 2024 | Antalya World Challenge Cup | | | | 8 | | |
| 2024 | Olympic Games | | | | 25 | 73 | 73 |
| 2025 | Paris World Challenge Cup | | | | 4 | | |
2026
| 2026 | African Championships | 2nd place, silver medalist(s) | 2nd place, silver medalist(s) | | 2nd place, silver medalist(s) | | |
| 2026 | Koper World Challenge Cup | | | | 2nd place, silver medalist(s) | | |
| 2026 | Commonwealth Games | 5 | WD | | | | |

Olympic Games
| Preceded by Phumelela Mbande; Chad le Clos | Flagbearer for South Africa; París 2024; With: Akani Simbine | Succeeded by Incumbent |
