= Sherine El-Zeiny =

Dutch-Egyptian artistic gymnast

- Full name: Sherine Ahmed El-Zeiny
- Nicknames: Sherry, Szeiny
- Born: 23 February 1991 (age 35) Alphen aan den Rijn, Netherlands
- Height: 1.63 m (5 ft 4 in)

Gymnastics career
- Discipline: Women's artistic gymnastics
- Country represented: Netherlands (2004–2006) Egypt; (2007–2018)
- Club: SV Pax Haarlemmermeer
Medal record
Representing Egypt
African Games
Gold medal – first place	2007 Algiers	All-around
Gold medal – first place	2007 Algiers	Floor exercise
Silver medal – second place	2007 Algiers	Team
Silver medal – second place	2007 Algiers	Balance beam
African Championships
Gold medal – first place	2009 Cairo	Team
Gold medal – first place	2009 Cairo	All-around
Gold medal – first place	2009 Cairo	Vault
Gold medal – first place	2009 Cairo	Uneven bars
Gold medal – first place	2012 Tunis	Team
Gold medal – first place	2016 Algiers	Team
Gold medal – first place	2016 Algiers	All-around
Bronze medal – third place	2009 Cairo	Balance beam
Bronze medal – third place	2012 Tunis	Floor exercise

Sherine Ahmed El-Zeiny (Arabic: شيرين أحمد الزيني; born 23 February 1991) is a Dutch-Egyptian artistic gymnast. Born in the Netherlands, El Zeiny trained all of her gymnastics career in the Netherlands, but she competed for her parents' homeland Egypt in numerous international tournaments since 2007, including three editions of the Summer Olympics (2008, 2012, and 2016). Representing Egypt, she won nine gold medals at the African Games and African Championships between 2007 and 2016. These include two team gold medals at the African Championships, in 2012 and 2016.

== Early life ==
El-Zeiny was born on 23 February 1991, in Alphen aan den Rijn, Netherlands, to Egyptian parents. Her mother, Eman Roshdy, played tennis, and her father, Ahmed El-Zeiny, played squash. She began taking gymnastics classes regularly at the age of six after a trainer at her school gym noticed her talent.

== Gymnastics career ==
El-Zeiny competed for the Netherlands at the 2004 Junior European Championships and finished sixth with the team. She left the Dutch national team to represent Egypt in 2007 at the advice of her coach, who believed she would have a better chance at competing at the Olympic Games for Egypt. She made her debut for Egypt at the 2007 All-Africa Games and won four medals, including the all-around title. At the 2007 World Championships, she finished 91st in the all-around qualifications.

El-Zeiny represented Egypt at the 2008 Summer Olympics, becoming the country's first female Olympian in artistic gymnastics. There, she finished 61st in the all-around qualifications and did not advance into any finals. At the 2009 World Championships, she finished 46th in the all-around qualifications, setting the record for the best World all-around finish for Egypt in women's gymnastics.

El-Zeiny helped Egypt win the team title at the 2012 African Championships, and she won a bronze medal on the floor exercise. She then represented Egypt at the 2012 Summer Olympics. During the qualifications, she injured her ACL during her floor routine and was unable to complete the competition. After the Olympic Games, she had surgery to repair to injury, and she missed two years of competition.

El-Zeiny returned to training nine months before the 2015 World Championships, but one week before the competition, she lost 90% of her vision due to an inflammation of the nerves in her eye and was hospitalized for three days. She still competed, but she finished behind Farah Boufadene of Algeria and all three South African gymnasts and thus did not earn a continental representation berth for the 2016 Olympic Games.

El-Zeiny won the all-around title at the 2016 African Championships and helped Egypt win the team title. Although she originally did not qualify for the 2016 Summer Olympics, South Africa declined to accept to continental representation berth, and it was reallocated to El-Zeiny. At the Olympics, she scored a personal-best 53.232 in the all-around and placed 39th in the qualifications.

El-Zeiny competed at the 2017 World Championships and finished 36th in the all-around qualifications, breaking her own record for the best female Egyptian all-around finish at a World Championships. She competed with the Egyptian team that finished fourth at the 2018 Mediterranean Games. This was the final competition of her career.

== Competitive history ==
Year	Event	Team	AA	VT	UB	BB	FX
Junior (Netherlands)
2004
2004	European Championships	6					
Senior (Egypt)
2007
2007	All-Africa Games	2nd place, silver medalist(s)	1st place, gold medalist(s)			2nd place, silver medalist(s)	1st place, gold medalist(s)
2007	World Championships		91				
2008
2008	Olympic Games		61				
2009
2009	African Championships	1st place, gold medalist(s)	1st place, gold medalist(s)	1st place, gold medalist(s)	1st place, gold medalist(s)	3rd place, bronze medalist(s)	5
2009	World Championships		46				
2011
2011	World Championships		135				
2012
2012	African Championships	1st place, gold medalist(s)				4	3rd place, bronze medalist(s)
2012	Olympic Games					53	82
2015
2015	World Championships		119				
2016
2016	African Championships	1st place, gold medalist(s)	1st place, gold medalist(s)				
2016	Olympic Games		39				
2016	Dutch Team Championships	1st place, gold medalist(s)	3rd place, bronze medalist(s)				
2017	Egyptian Championships		1st place, gold medalist(s)	3rd place, bronze medalist(s)	1st place, gold medalist(s)	2nd place, silver medalist(s)	2nd place, silver medalist(s)
2017	Dutch Championships		4		2nd place, silver medalist(s)		
2017	World Championships		36				
2018	Mediterranean Games	4					
