= Gymnastics at the 2019 African Games =

- Venue: Ibn Rochd Hall 1
- Location: Rabat, Morocco
- Dates: 26–29 August

Artistic gymnastics events were held at the 2019 African Games from 26 to 29 August 2019 in Rabat, Morocco.

== Participating nations ==
- Algeria
- Angola
- Cameroon
- Egypt
- Ethiopia
- Morocco
- Nigeria
- Republic of the Congo
- Tunisia

== Medal table ==
* Host nation (Morocco)

| Rank | Nation | Gold | Silver | Bronze | Total |
|---|---|---|---|---|---|
| 1 | Egypt (EGY) | 8 | 7 | 3 | 18 |
| 2 | Algeria (ALG) | 5 | 7 | 5 | 17 |
| 3 | Nigeria (NGR) | 1 | 0 | 2 | 3 |
| 4 | Morocco (MAR)* | 0 | 0 | 2 | 2 |
| 4 | Tunisia (TUN) | 0 | 0 | 2 | 2 |
| Totals (5 entries) | | 14 | 14 | 14 | 42 |

== Medal summary ==
=== Men ===
| Event | Gold | Silver | Bronze |
|---|---|---|---|
| Team all-around | Algeria; Hillal Metidji; Mohamed Bourguieg; Mohamed Aouicha; Ahmed-anis Maoudj; Islem Lettreuch | Egypt; Mohamed Moubarak; Mohamed Afify; Zaid Khater; Karim Mohamed; Ali Zahran | Morocco; Nabil Zouhair; Zakariae Setti; Ayoub Es Seyaf; Nahel Bouanane; Anass Naciri |
| Individual all-around | Hillal Metidji; Algeria | Mohamed Bourguieg; Algeria | Mohamed Moubarak; Egypt |
| Floor exercise | Ahmed-anis Maoudj; Algeria | Mohamed Bourguieg; Algeria | Nabil Zouhair; Morocco |
| Pommel horse | Uche Eke; Nigeria | Mohamed Aouicha; Algeria | Wissem Harzi; Tunisia |
| Rings | Ali Zahran; Egypt | Mohamed Bourguieg; Algeria | Mohamed Moubarak; Egypt |
| Vault | Mohamed Bourguieg; Algeria | Ahmed-anis Maoudj; Algeria | Mohamed Moubarak; Egypt |
| Parallel bars | Hillal Metidji; Algeria | Zaid Khater; Egypt | Uche Eke; Nigeria |
| Horizontal bar | Karim Mohamed; Egypt | Hillal Metidji; Algeria | Mohamed Aouicha; Algeria |

=== Women ===
| Event | Gold | Silver | Bronze |
|---|---|---|---|
| Team all-around | Egypt; Farah Hussein; Farah Salem; Mandy Mohamed; Nancy Taman; Zeina Sharaf | Algeria; Chama Temmami; Lahna Salem; Medina Medjahdi; Sofia Nair; Fatima Mokhtari | Nigeria; Amenagawhon Melvin; Helen Ocheke; Adekemi Adesida; Adenike Oyekunle; Oluwadamilola Oluwafemi |
| Individual all-around | Farah Hussein; Egypt | Farah Salem; Egypt | Lahna Salem; Algeria |
| Vault | Nancy Taman; Egypt | Farah Salem; Egypt | Chahed Sakr; Tunisia |
| Uneven bars | Farah Hussein; Egypt | Zeina Sharaf; Egypt | Lahna Salem; Algeria |
| Balance beam | Farah Hussein; Egypt | Mandy Mohamed; Egypt | Sofia Nair; Algeria |
| Floor exercise | Mandy Mohamed; Egypt | Nancy Taman; Egypt | Lahna Salem; Algeria |
