= Mohamed Bourguieg =

Algerian artistic gymnast (born 1996)

- Full name: Mohamed Abdeldjalil Bourguieg
- Born: 31 August 1996 (age 30) Boufarik, Algeria
- Height: 1.55 m (5 ft 1 in)

Gymnastics career
- Discipline: Men's artistic gymnastics
- Country represented: Algeria (2014)
- Club: WAB Boufarik
- Head coach: Abdelmadjid Hadji
Medal record
Men's artistic gymnastics
Representing Algeria
All-Africa Games
Gold medal – first place	2015 Brazzaville	Team
Gold medal – first place	2015 Brazzaville	Vault
Gold medal – first place	2019 Rabat	Team
Gold medal – first place	2019 Rabat	Vault
Silver medal – second place	2015 Brazzaville	All-around
Silver medal – second place	2019 Rabat	All-around
Silver medal – second place	2019 Rabat	Floor exercise
Silver medal – second place	2019 Rabat	Rings
African Championships
Gold medal – first place	2014 Pretoria	Team
Gold medal – first place	2014 Pretoria	Vault
Gold medal – first place	2018 Algiers	Team
Gold medal – first place	2018 Algiers	Floor exercise
Gold medal – first place	2018 Algiers	Vault
Gold medal – first place	2018 Algiers	Parallel bars
Silver medal – second place	2018 Algiers	All-around
Silver medal – second place	2022 Cairo	Team
Bronze medal – third place	2014 Pretoria	All-around
Bronze medal – third place	2014 Pretoria	Floor exercise
Bronze medal – third place	2018 Algiers	Rings
Bronze medal – third place	2018 Algiers	Horizontal bar
Islamic Solidarity Games
Silver medal – second place	2017 Baku	Vault

Mohamed Abdeldjalil Bourguieg (born 31 August 1996) is an Algerian male artistic gymnast, He participated in two editions of the World Championships (2014 in Nanjing, China, and 2015 in Glasgow, Scotland), and qualified for the 2016 Summer Olympics, securing one of the spots available at the Olympic Test Event in Rio de Janeiro.
