= 2026 African Artistic Gymnastics Championships =

Artistic Gymnastics Championship

- Venue: Yaoundé Multipurpose Sports Complex
- Location: Yaoundé, Cameroon
- Date: 23–26 April 2026

The 2026 African Artistic Gymnastics Championships was the 18th iteration of the event and took place on April 23–26 in Yaoundé, Cameroon. Both senior and junior titles were contested. The competition served as qualification for the 2026 World Championships.

== Medal winners ==
=== Senior ===
Event	Gold	Silver	Bronze
Men
Team	Egypt; Mohamed Afify; Mostafa Ahmed; Omar Elshobki; Omar Mohamed; Yahia Zakaria	Algeria; Ahmed Riadh Aliouat; Adam Cogat; H'mida Djaber; Houssem Hamadouche; Youcef Semmani	South Africa; Kadin Chester; Travis Giles; Ruan Lange; Daniel McLean
All-around	(Egypt) Omar Mohamed	(Egypt) Mohamed Afify	(Algeria) Adam Cogat
Floor Exercise	(South Africa) Daniel McLean	(Algeria) Adam Cogat	(Egypt) Mohamed Afify
Pommel Horse	(Egypt) Mohamed Afify	(Egypt) Omar Elshobki	(Algeria) Youcef Semmani
Rings	(Egypt) Omar Mohamed	(Algeria) Houssem Hamadouche	(Egypt) Omar Elshobki
Vault	(Morocco) Hamza Hossaini	(Egypt) Mostafa Ahmed	(Tunisia) Ahmed Labidi
Parallel Bars	(Egypt) Omar Mohamed	(Algeria) Adam Cogat	(Morocco) Hamza Hossaini
Horizontal Bar	(Egypt) Omar Mohamed	(Algeria) Adam Cogat	(Egypt) Mostafa Ahmed
Women
Team	Algeria; Louna Hamames Moallic; Sihem Hamidi; Lena Khenoun; Djenna Laroui; Kaylia Nemour	South Africa; Naveen Daries; Zelmé Daries; Buhle Nhleko; Caitlin Rooskrantz; Karma Visagie	Egypt; Judy Abdalla; Jana Abdelsalam; Sirine Abouelhoda; Jana Mahmoud; Claudine Soliman
All-around	(Algeria) Kaylia Nemour	(South Africa) Caitlin Rooskrantz	(Algeria) Djenna Laroui
Vault	(Algeria) Djenna Laroui	(South Africa) Buhle Nhleko	(Egypt) Sirine Abouelhoda
Uneven Bars	(Algeria) Kaylia Nemour	(South Africa) Caitlin Rooskrantz	(Algeria) Djenna Laroui
Balance Beam	(Algeria) Kaylia Nemour	(Algeria) Djenna Laroui	(Egypt) Jana Abdelsalam
Floor Exercise	(Algeria) Kaylia Nemour	(Morocco) Salina Bousmayou	(Egypt) Sirine Abouelhoda

=== Junior ===
Event	Gold	Silver	Bronze
Boys
Team	Egypt	South Africa	Algeria
All-around	(Egypt) Abdullah Sharawy	(Egypt) Mazen El Sayed	(South Africa) Fredrik Davies-Vaneetvelde
Floor Exercise	(Egypt) Mazen El Sayed	(Egypt) Abdallah Shaaraway	(Tunisia) Khalil Kimititaha
Pommel Horse	(Egypt) Mohamed Abdelkawy	(Egypt) Abdallah Shaarawy	(South Africa) Frederik Davies-Vaneetvelde
Rings	(Egypt) Mazen El Sayed	(Egypt) Abdallah Shaarawy	(South Africa) Tapiwa Mkandawire
Vault	(Egypt) Moaz Abouward	(Egypt) Mazen El Sayed	(Cameroon) Celestin Simba
Parallel Bars	(Egypt) Abdallah Shaarawy	(South Africa) Frederik Davies-Vaneetvelde	(Egypt) Mazen El Sayed
Horizontal Bar	(Egypt) Belal Elgazzar	(South Africa) Frederik Davies-Vaneetvelde	(Egypt) Mazen El Sayed
Girls
Team	Egypt	South Africa	Algeria
All-around	(Egypt) Tia Elmidany	(Egypt) Malak Maklad	(South Africa) Lila du Plessis
Vault	(Algeria) Melissa Djadi	(Egypt) Juzal Elgarhi	(Egypt) Tia Elmidany
Uneven Bars	(Egypt) Tia Elmidany	(Egypt) Malak Maklad	(Tunisia) Myriam Feki (South Africa) Lila du Plessis
Balance Beam	(Egypt) Tia Elmidany	(Mali) Cora Noguer Munoz	(Algeria) Sabrinel Ifticen
Floor Exercise	(Egypt) Tia Elmidany	(Egypt) Malikah Ahmed	(South Africa) Ariana Viljoen

== Medal table ==
=== Combined ===
* Host nation (Cameroon)

Rank	Nation	Gold	Silver	Bronze	Total
1	Egypt (EGY)	19	12	10	41
2	Algeria (ALG)	7	6	7	20
3	South Africa (RSA)	1	8	7	16
4	Morocco (MAR)	1	1	1	3
5	Mali (MLI)	0	1	0	1
6	Tunisia (TUN)	0	0	3	3
7	Cameroon (CMR)*	0	0	1	1
Totals (7 entries)		28	28	29	85

=== Men ===
* Host nation (Cameroon)

Rank	Nation	Gold	Silver	Bronze	Total
1	Egypt (EGY)	14	8	5	27
2	South Africa (RSA)	1	3	4	8
3	Morocco (MAR)	1	0	1	2
4	Algeria (ALG)	0	5	3	8
5	Tunisia (TUN)	0	0	2	2
6	Cameroon (CMR)*	0	0	1	1
Totals (6 entries)		16	16	16	48

=== Women ===
* Host nation (Cameroon)

Rank	Nation	Gold	Silver	Bronze	Total
1	Algeria (ALG)	7	1	4	12
2	Egypt (EGY)	5	4	5	14
3	South Africa (RSA)	0	5	3	8
4	Mali (MLI)	0	1	0	1
4	Morocco (MAR)	0	1	0	1
6	Tunisia (TUN)	0	0	1	1
7	Cameroon (CMR)*	0	0	0	0
Totals (7 entries)		12	12	13	37

== Participating nations ==
- Algeria
- Cameroon
- DR Congo
- Egypt
- Mali
- Morocco
- Namibia
- South Africa
- Senegal
- Togo
- Tunisia
- Zimbabwe
