= Farah Hussein =

Egyptian artistic gymnast (born 2001)

- Born: 7 October 2001 (age 24)

Gymnastics career
- Discipline: Women's artistic gymnastics
- Country represented: Egypt; (2016–2021)
Medal record
African Games
Gold medal – first place	2019 Rabat	Team
Gold medal – first place	2019 Rabat	All-Around
Gold medal – first place	2019 Rabat	Uneven Bars
Gold medal – first place	2019 Rabat	Balance Beam
African Championships
Gold medal – first place	2018 Swakopmund	Team
Gold medal – first place	2018 Swakopmund	All-Around
Silver medal – second place	2018 Swakopmund	Vault
Silver medal – second place	2018 Swakopmund	Uneven Bars
Silver medal – second place	2021 Cairo	All-Around
FIG World Cup
Bronze medal – third place	2019 Koper	Balance Beam

Farah Hussein (born 7 October 2001) is an Egyptian artistic gymnast.

Hussein competed at the 2019 African Games where she won gold medals in the individual all-around, uneven bars, beam and team all-around events. She also won a bronze medal at the 2019 Artistic Gymnastics Koper World Challenge Cup series in the balance beam event.
