= 2023 African Artistic Gymnastics Championships =

Artistic Gymnastics Championship

African Artistic Gymnastics Championships
- Venue: Heartfelt Arena
- Location: Pretoria, South Africa
- Date: 26–27 May 2023

The 2023 African Artistic Gymnastics Championships was the 17th iteration of the event. It took place on 26–27 May in Pretoria, South Africa. The competition served as qualification for the 2023 World Championships.

== Medal winners ==
Event	Gold	Silver	Bronze
Men
Team	Egypt; Omar Mohamed; Ahmed Abdelrahman; Zaid Khater; Mohamed Afify; Abdelrahman Abdelhaleem	Algeria; Hillal Metidji; H'Mida Djaber; Houssem Eddine Hamadouche; Bilal Bellaoui; Ahmed Riadh Aliouat	Morocco; Abderrazak Nasser; Hamza Hossaini; Achraf Quistas; Abdelaziz Essamyri
All-around	(Egypt) Omar Mohamed	(Egypt) Mohamed Afify	(Algeria) Hillal Metidji
Women
Team	South Africa; Caleigh Anders; Naveen Daries; Shante Koti; Garcelle Napier; Caitlin Rooskrantz	Egypt; Jana Abdelsalam; Nada Awad; Sandra Elsadek; Jana Mahmoud; Nancy Taman	Algeria; Sihem Hamidi; Kaylia Nemour; Malek Rezagui; Lahna Salem; Chama Temmami
All-around	(Algeria) Kaylia Nemour	(South Africa) Caitlin Rooskrantz	(Egypt) Jana Abdelsalam

== Medal table ==
=== Combined ===
* Host nation (South Africa)

Rank	Nation	Gold	Silver	Bronze	Total
1	Egypt (EGY)	2	2	1	5
2	Algeria (ALG)	1	1	2	4
3	South Africa (RSA)*	1	1	0	2
4	Morocco (MAR)	0	0	1	1
Totals (4 entries)		4	4	4	12

=== Men ===
Rank	Nation	Gold	Silver	Bronze	Total
1	Egypt (EGY)	2	1	0	3
2	Algeria (ALG)	0	1	1	2
3	Morocco (MAR)	0	0	1	1
Totals (3 entries)		2	2	2	6

=== Women ===
* Host nation (South Africa)

Rank	Nation	Gold	Silver	Bronze	Total
1	South Africa (RSA)*	1	1	0	2
2	Algeria (ALG)	1	0	1	2
3	Egypt (EGY)	0	1	1	2
Totals (3 entries)		2	2	2	6

== World Championships qualification ==
The top men's team and women's team qualified a full team to the 2023 World Championships in Antwerp, Belgium. In women's artistic gymnastics, South Africa qualified a full team. Additionally, Kaylia Nemour (Algeria), Jana Abdelsalam (Egypt), Sandra Elsadek (Egypt), and Lahna Salem (Algeria) earned individual berths. In men's artistic gymnastics, Egypt qualified a full team. In addition, Hillal Metidji (Algeria) and Hamza Hossaini (Morocco) earned individual berths.
