= Nancy Taman =

Egyptian artistic gymnast (born 1994)

- Full name: Nancy Mohamed Ali Taman
- Born: 15 November 1994 (age 31) Alexandria, Egypt

Gymnastics career
- Discipline: Women's artistic gymnastics
- Country represented: Egypt; (2007–present)
Medal record
Women's artistic gymnastics
Representing Egypt
African Games
| Gold medal – first place | 2019 Rabat | Vault |
| Gold medal – first place | 2019 Rabat | Team |
| Silver medal – second place | 2015 Brazzaville | Team |
| Silver medal – second place | 2019 Rabat | Floor Exercise |
African Championships
| Gold medal – first place | 2012 Tunis | Team |
| Gold medal – first place | 2018 Swakopmund | Team |
| Gold medal – first place | 2018 Swakopmund | Vault |
| Gold medal – first place | 2022 Cairo | Team |
| Silver medal – second place | 2010 Walvis Bay | Team |
| Silver medal – second place | 2012 Tunis | Floor Exercise |
| Silver medal – second place | 2022 Cairo | Vault |
| Silver medal – second place | 2023 Pretoria | Team |
| Bronze medal – third place | 2012 Tunis | All-Around |
| Bronze medal – third place | 2012 Tunis | Vault |
| Bronze medal – third place | 2018 Swakopmund | Floor Exercise |
Mediterranean Games
| Gold medal – first place | 2018 Tarragona | Vault |
FIG World Cup
| Event | 1st | 2nd | 3rd |
|---|---|---|---|
| World Cup | 0 | 0 | 1 |
| World Challenge Cup | 1 | 0 | 0 |

Nancy Mohamed Ali Taman (born 15 November 1994; Alexandria, Egypt) is an Egyptian artistic gymnast. Taman earned two gold medals in the 2018 Mediterranean Games and the 2019 African Games and won a silver medal in the 2015 African Games.

== Gymnastics career ==
Taman started her gymnastics career in 1998 at the age of four. She made her international debut at the Gymnix International competition in 2007 as a member of the Egyptian Gymnastics Federation.

Taman was part of the team that participated in the 2011 World Artistic Gymnastics Championships held in Tokyo, Japan, as well as the 2013 World Artistic Gymnastics Championships held in Antwerp, Belgium where she placed fifth in vault. She placed sixth in the women's individual all-around final at the 2013 Mediterranean Games hosted in Mersin, Turkey.

She competed for Egypt at the 2014 Summer Youth Olympics held in Beijing, China. In 2015, Taman participated in three competitions; the 2015 World Artistic Gymnastics Championships held in Glasgow, United Kingdom, the Challenge Cup in Croatia, and the 2015 African Games held in Congo where she won a silver medal. In 2018, Taman took part in the Osijek World Cup in Croatia. Later that year, she won a gold medal in vault at the 2018 Mediterranean Games.

In 2019, Taman competed at the African Games where she won gold medals in the vault and team all-around events and a silver medal in the floor exercise event.

In 2021, Taman competed at the Challenge World Cup in Cairo, winning the gold medal on vault. At the 2021 World Artistic Gymnastics Championships, she became the first gymnast from the African continent to qualify to an event final. She finished fourth in the vault competition.

== Competitive history ==
Competitive history of Nancy Taman
| Year | Event | Team | AA | VT | UB | BB | FX |
2010
| 2010 | African Championships | 2nd place, silver medalist(s) | | | | | |
2011
| 2011 | World Championships | | 144 | | | | |
2012
| 2012 | African Championships | 1st place, gold medalist(s) | 3rd place, bronze medalist(s) | 3rd place, bronze medalist(s) | | | 2nd place, silver medalist(s) |
| 2013 | Mediterranean Games | 4 | 6 | 5 | | 8 | |
| 2013 | World Championships | | | | | 82 | |
2014
| 2014 | World Championships | | 113 | | | | |
2015
| 2015 | All-Africa Games | 2nd place, silver medalist(s) | 2nd place, silver medalist(s) | 3rd place, bronze medalist(s) | 5 | 4 | |
| 2015 | Osijek World Challenge Cup | | | 4 | | | |
| 2015 | World Championships | | 138 | | | | |
| 2017 | Egyptian Championships | | 6 | 1st place, gold medalist(s) | | | |
2018
| 2018 | African Championships | 1st place, gold medalist(s) | | 1st place, gold medalist(s) | | | 3rd place, bronze medalist(s) |
| 2018 | Osijek Challenge Cup | | | 8 | | | |
| 2018 | Mediterranean Games | 4 | | 1st place, gold medalist(s) | | | |
| 2018 | Szombathely Challenge Cup | | | 6 | | | |
| 2018 | World Championships | 25 | 91 | | | | |
2019
| 2019 | African Games | 1st place, gold medalist(s) | | 1st place, gold medalist(s) | | | 2nd place, silver medalist(s) |
| 2019 | World Championships | 24 | 128 | | | | |
| 2021 | Cairo Challenge Cup | | | 1st place, gold medalist(s) | | | |
| 2021 | Doha World Cup | | | 3rd place, bronze medalist(s) | | | |
| 2021 | World Championships | | | 4 | | | |
| 2022 | Cairo World Cup | | | 8 | | | |
| 2022 | African Championships | 1st place, gold medalist(s) | | 2nd place, silver medalist(s) | | | |
| 2022 | Paris Challenge Cup | | | 6 | | | |
| 2022 | World Championships | 22 | | | | | |
| 2023 | Baku World Cup | | | 7 | | | |
| 2023 | African Championships | 2nd place, silver medalist(s) | | | | | |
