= Mohamed El-Saharty =

Egyptian gymnast

- محمد شريف السحرتي
- Full name: Mohamed Sherif El-Saharty
- Born: 26 July 1990 (age 36) Giza, Egypt

Gymnastics career
- Discipline: Men's artistic gymnastics
- Country represented: Egypt
Medal record
Men's artistic gymnastics
Event	1st	2nd	3rd
African Games	2	2	1
Arab Games	5	0	1
Total	7	2	2
Representing Egypt
African Games
Gold medal – first place	2015 Brazzaville	All-around
Gold medal – first place	2015 Brazzaville	Parallel bars
Silver medal – second place	2015 Brazzaville	Pommel horse
Silver medal – second place	2015 Brazzaville	Horizontal bar
Bronze medal – third place	2015 Brazzaville	Rings
Arab Games
Gold medal – first place	2011 Doha	Team
Gold medal – first place	2011 Doha	All-around
Gold medal – first place	2011 Doha	Pommel horse
Gold medal – first place	2011 Doha	Vault
Gold medal – first place	2011 Doha	Horizontal bar
Bronze medal – third place	2011 Doha	Parallel bars

Mohamed Sherif El-Saharty (born 26 July 1990) is an Egyptian gymnast. He competed at the 2012 Summer Olympics.
