= 2018 African Artistic Gymnastics Championships =

Artistic Gymnastics Championship

African Artistic Gymnastics Championships
- Venue: The Dome
- Location: Swakopmund, Namibia
- Date: May 9–12, 2018
- Competitors: 75 from 7 nations

The 2018 African Artistic Gymnastics Championships was the 14th iteration of the event and took place on May 9–12 in Swakopmund, Namibia.

== Medal winners ==
=== Senior ===
Event	Gold	Silver	Bronze
Men
Team	(Algeria) Algeria; Mohamed Aouicha; Ahmed Anis Maoudj; Naimi Mechkour; Hillal Metidji; Mohamed Reghib	(Egypt) Egypt; Ahmed Abdelrahman; Ahmed El Maraghy; Omar Mohamed; Mohamed Moubark; Ali Zahran	(Cameroon) Cameroon; Chris Sylvain Djoufack Ngoma; Zomo Gpandinga; Franck Max Monti; Hubert Evard Mvondo; Samuel Paulson Djider
All-around	Omar Mohamed (EGY)	Hillal Metidji (ALG)	Ahmed El Maraghy (EGY)
Floor Exercise	Omar Mohamed (EGY)	Ahmed Anis Maoudj (ALG)	Naimi Mechkour (ALG)
Pommel Horse	Mohame Aouicha (ALG)	Wissem Harzi (TUN)	Hillal Metidji (ALG)
Rings	Ali Zahran (EGY)	Ahmed El Maraghy (EGY)	Hillal Metidji (ALG)
Vault	Mohamed Aziz Trabelsi (TUN)	Omar Mohamed (EGY)	Ahmed El Maraghy (EGY)
Parallel Bars	Hillal Metidji (ALG)	Naimi Mechkour (ALG)	Omar Mohamed (EGY)
Horizontal Bar	Mohamed Reghib (ALG)	Ahmed El Maraghy (EGY)	Mohamed Aouicha (ALG)
Women
Team	(Egypt) Egypt; Farah Hussein; Hana Kassem; Farah Salem; Nancy Taman	(South Africa) South Africa; Caitlyn Kelly; Angela Maguire; Gabriella Murray; Caitlin Rooskrantz; Lukisha Schalk	(Algeria) Algeria; Zineb Mama Ayad; Fatima Ahlem Mokhtari; Lahna Salem; Chama Temmami
All-around	Farah Hussein (EGY)	Farah Salem (EGY)	Angela Maguire (RSA)
Vault	Nancy Taman (EGY)	Farah Hussein (EGY)	Gabriella Murray (RSA)
Uneven Bars	Caitlin Rooskrantz (RSA)	Farah Hussein (EGY)	Caitlyn Kelly (RSA)
Balance Beam	Lukisha Schalk (RSA)	Farah Salem (EGY)	Hana Kassem (EGY)
Floor Exercise	Lukisha Schalk (RSA) Gabriella Murray (RSA)	—N/a	Nancy Taman (EGY)

=== Junior ===
Event	Gold	Silver	Bronze
Men
Team	(Egypt) Egypt; Abdelrahman Abdelhaleem; Mohamed Afify; Omar Elshobki; Zaid Khater; Mohamed Moussa	(South Africa) South Africa; Riccardo Colandrea; Andrew Flynn; Luke James; Ruan Langen	(Algeria) Algeria; Abdennour Aissa; Abdelkader Boukhatem; Hmida Djaber; Abderrahmane Ouchfoune
All-around	Mohamed Afify (EGY)	Zaid Khater (EGY)	Ruan Lange (RSA)
Floor Exercise	Abdelrahman Abdelhaleem (EGY)	Zaid Khater (EGY)	Luke James (RSA)
Pommel Horse	Mohamed Afify (EGY)	Abdelrahman Abdelhaleem (EGY)	Abderrahmane Ouchfoune (ALG)
Rings	Mohamed Afify (EGY)	Zaid Khater (EGY)	Ruan Lange (RSA)
Vault	Emile Pitt (NAM)	Mohamed Moussa (EGY)	Andrew Flynn (RSA)
Parallel Bars	Mohamed Afify (EGY)	Zaid Khater (EGY) Abdennour Aissa (ALG)	—N/a
Horizontal Bar	Mohamed Afify (EGY)	Ruan Lange (RSA)	Luke James (RSA)
Women
Team	(Egypt) Egypt; Jana Aboelhasan; Nagham Gohar; Samaa Gohar; Zeina Ibrahim; Jana Mahmoud	(South Africa) South Africa; Erin Bell; Lisa Conradie; Zelmé Daries; Zoe Julies; Nkazimio Matyolo	(Algeria) Algeria; Miriam Hamenni; Sihem Hamidi; Lylia Menasria; Sofia Nair
All-around	Jana Mahmoud (EGY)	Lisa Conradie (RSA)	Zeina Ibrahim (EGY)
Uneven Bars	Lisa Conradie (RSA)	Jana Mahmoud (EGY)	Zeina Ibrahim (EGY)
Balance Beam	Lisa Conradie (RSA)	Jana Mahmoud (EGY)	Sofia Nair (ALG)
Floor Exercise	Jana Aboelhasan (EGY)	Lisa Conradie (RSA)	Malek Sakr (TUN)

== Medal table ==
=== Combined ===
Rank	Nation	Gold	Silver	Bronze	Total
1	Egypt (EGY)	16	16	7	39
2	South Africa (RSA)	6	6	8	20
3	Algeria (ALG)	4	4	9	17
4	Tunisia (TUN)	1	1	1	3
5	Namibia (NAM)	1	0	0	1
6	Cameroon (CMR)	0	0	1	1
Totals (6 entries)		28	27	26	81

=== Men ===
Rank	Nation	Gold	Silver	Bronze	Total
1	Egypt (EGY)	10	10	3	23
2	Algeria (ALG)	4	4	6	14
3	Tunisia (TUN)	1	1	0	2
4	Namibia (NAM)	1	0	0	1
5	South Africa (RSA)	0	2	5	7
6	Cameroon (CMR)	0	0	1	1
Totals (6 entries)		16	17	15	48

=== Women ===
Rank	Nation	Gold	Silver	Bronze	Total
1	Egypt (EGY)	6	6	4	16
2	South Africa (RSA)	6	4	3	13
3	Algeria (ALG)	0	0	3	3
4	Tunisia (TUN)	0	0	1	1
Totals (4 entries)		12	10	11	33

== Youth Olympic berths ==
The event served as qualification for the 2018 Youth Olympic Games. For women's artistic gymnastics South Africa, Egypt, and Algeria qualified berths. For men's artistic gymnastics Egypt and South Africa qualified berths.
