= Kirsten Beckett =

South African artistic gymnast (born 1996)

- Born: 5 March 1996 (age 30) Johannesburg, South Africa
- Height: 1.64 m (5 ft 5 in)

Gymnastics career
- Discipline: Women's artistic gymnastics
- Country represented: South Africa
- Club: JGC
Medal record
Representing South Africa
African Championships
| Gold medal – first place | 2012 Tunis | Balance Beam |
| Gold medal – first place | 2012 Tunis | Floor Exercise |
| Gold medal – first place | 2014 Pretoria | Team |
| Gold medal – first place | 2014 Pretoria | All-Around |
| Gold medal – first place | 2014 Pretoria | Uneven Bars |
| Gold medal – first place | 2014 Pretoria | Floor Exercise |
| Silver medal – second place | 2012 Tunis | All-Around |
| Silver medal – second place | 2012 Tunis | Vault |
| Silver medal – second place | 2014 Pretoria | Vault |
| Bronze medal – third place | 2014 Pretoria | Balance Beam |

Kirsten Beckett (born 5 March 1996) is a South African artistic gymnast. She was part of the South African 2014 Commonwealth Games team.
