= African Artistic Gymnastics Championships =

Artistic Gymnastics Championship

The African Artistic Gymnastics Championship (French: Championnats d'Afrique de gymnastique Artistique) is the top artistic gymnastics African tournament. Initially it was held roughly every two years in even years, but starting in 2021 it was held on odd years when Olympic or World Championships qualification was necessary. In those cases, only team and all-around events are contested whereas in even years all events are contested. It is governed by the African Gymnastics Union.

== Summary of championships (Senior and Junior) ==
Year	Host City	Date	Venue	No. of Athletes	Lead nation (S)	Lead nation (J)
1990	(Algeria) Algiers	20–26 October 1990	La Coupole		Algeria	
1992	(Morocco) Casablanca				Algeria	
1994	(South Africa) Johannesburg	3–8 October 1994	Wembley Indoor Sports Complex		South Africa	
1998	(Namibia) Walvis Bay	19–24 April 1998				
2000	(Tunisia) Tunis	18–26 November 2000			Tunisia	
2002	(Algeria) Algiers	12–19 October 2002	Hazem Abdelghani Omnisports Hall		Algeria	South Africa
2004	(Senegal) Thiès	10–19 December 2004	Lat-Dior Hall		South Africa	South Africa
2006	(South Africa) Cape Town	21–30 November 2006			South Africa	South Africa
2009	(Egypt) Cairo	29 January – 5 February 2009	Cairo Stadium Indoor Halls Complex		Egypt	Egypt
2010	(Namibia) Walvis Bay	3–5 March 2010	Jan Wilken Indoor Sports Complex		Egypt	Egypt
2012	(Tunisia) Tunis	11–14 April 2012	El Menzah Sports Palace		Egypt	Egypt
2014	(South Africa) Pretoria	27–30 March 2014	University of Pretoria		Egypt	Egypt
2016	(Algeria) Algiers	23–26 March 2016	La Coupole	63	Algeria	Egypt
2018	(Namibia) Swakopmund	9–12 May 2018	The Dome	75	Egypt	Egypt
2021	(Egypt) Cairo	26–27 May 2021	Nasr City Sporting Club	28	Egypt	
2022	(Egypt) Cairo	8–11 July 2022	Cairo Stadium Indoor Halls Complex	79	Egypt	Egypt
2023	(South Africa) Pretoria	26–27 May 2023	Heartfelt Arena	48	Egypt	
2024	(Morocco) Marrakesh	3–6 May 2024	Salle M'hamid		Egypt	Egypt
2026	(Cameroon) Yaoundé	23–26 April 2026	Yaoundé Multipurpose Sports Complex		Algeria	Egypt

== See also ==
- Gymnastics at the African Games
- African Rhythmic Gymnastics Championships
- African Trampoline Championships
