= List of Olympic female artistic gymnasts for Egypt =

Gymnastics events have been staged at the Olympic Games since 1896, with women competing for the time at the 1928 Olympic Games. Sherine El-Zeiny became the first female Egyptian artistic gymnast to compete at the Olympic Games, doing so in 2008. Since then Egypt has had at least one female gymnast at the Olympic Games.

== Gymnasts ==
Gymnast	Years	Ref.
Sherine El-Zeiny	2008, 2012, 2016	
Zeina Ibrahim	2020	
Jana Mahmoud	2024	
Salma Mahmoud	2012	
Mandy Mohamed	2020	

== See also ==
- Egypt women's national artistic gymnastics team
