= 2022 in artistic gymnastics =

Below is a list of notable men's and women's artistic gymnastics international events scheduled to be held in 2022 as well as the medalists.

== Retirements ==
Gymnasts who announced retirements in 2022
Gymnast	Country	Date	Ref
Kohei Uchimura	Japan	10 January 2022	
Maria Kharenkova	Georgia	26 January 2022	
Farah Ann Abdul Hadi	Malaysia	12 March 2022	
Hitomi Hatakeda	Japan	23 March 2022	
Elena Eremina	Russia	4 April 2022	
Seiya Taura	Japan	25 April 2022	
Jonna Adlerteg	Sweden	28 April 2022	
Danusia Francis	Jamaica	29 May 2022	
Lilia Akhaimova	Russia	17 June 2022	
Kazuyuki Takeda	Japan	22 June 2022	
Laura Bechdejú	Spain	5 July 2022	
Ariana Orrego	Peru	26 July 2022	
Julien Gobaux	France	27 July 2022	
Alec Yoder	United States	9 August 2022	
Diana Varinska	Ukraine	13 August 2022	
Kim Bui	Germany	14 August 2022	
Anastasia Bachynska	Ukraine	15 August 2022	
Philipp Herder	Germany	24 October 2022	
Guan Chenchen	China	28 October 2022	
Cintia Rodríguez	Spain	15 November 2022	
Lisa Zimmermann	Germany	1 December 2022	

== Calendar of events ==
Date	Location	Event	Men's winners	Women's winners
February 24–27	(Germany) Cottbus	FIG World Cup	FX: Yahor Sharamkou; PH: (Croatia) Filip Ude; SR: (Turkey) İbrahim Çolak; VT: (Armenia) Artur Davtyan; PB: (Ukraine) Illia Kovtun; HB: (United States) Brody Malone	VT: (Slovenia) Tjaša Kysselef; UB: (Netherlands) Tisha Volleman; BB: (Ukraine) Daniela Batrona; FX: (Spain) Alba Petisco
March 2–5	(Qatar) Doha	FIG World Cup	FX: (Israel) Artem Dolgopyat; PH: (Kazakhstan) Nariman Kurbanov; SR: (Armenia) Vahagn Davtyan; VT: (Armenia) Artur Davtyan; PB: (Ukraine) Illia Kovtun; HB: (Israel) Alexander Myakinin	VT: (Uzbekistan) Oksana Chusovitina; UB: Viktoria Listunova; BB: Vladislava Urazova; FX: Maria Minaeva
March 13–20	(Egypt) Cairo	FIG World Cup	FX: (Israel) Artem Dolgopyat; PH: (Republic of Ireland) Rhys McClenaghan; SR: (Armenia) Vahagn Davtyan; VT: (Armenia) Artur Davtyan; PB: (Ukraine) Illia Kovtun; HB: (Italy) Carlo Macchini	VT: (Slovenia) Tjaša Kysselef; UB: (South Africa) Caitlin Rooskrantz; BB: (Ukraine) Yuliia Kasianenko; FX: (Hungary) Dorina Böczögő
March 31–April 4	(Azerbaijan) Baku	FIG World Cup	FX: (Israel) Artem Dolgopyat; PH: (Kazakhstan) Nariman Kurbanov; SR: (Italy) Salvatore Maresca; VT: (Ukraine) Nazar Chepurnyi; PB: (Ukraine) Illia Kovtun; HB: (United Kingdom) Joe Fraser	VT: (Uzbekistan) Oksana Chusovitina; UB: (France) Lorette Charpy; BB: (Germany) Sarah Voss; FX: (Brazil) Júlia Soares
April 28–May 8	(Argentina) Rosario	South American Youth Games	TF: Colombia; AA: Ángel Barajas; FX: Ángel Barajas; PH: Ángel Barajas; SR: (Brazil) João Victor Perdigão; VT: Ángel Barajas; PB: Ángel Barajas; HB: Ángel Barajas	TF: Brazil; AA: (Argentina) Mia Mainardi; VT: (Argentina) Mia Mainardi; UB: (Argentina) Isabella Ajalla; BB: (Argentina) Isabella Ajalla; FX: (Argentina) Mia Mainardi
May 12–23	(Vietnam) Hanoi	Southeast Asian Games	TF: Vietnam; AA: (Philippines) Carlos Yulo; FX: (Philippines) Carlos Yulo; PH: (Vietnam) Đặng Ngọc Xuân Thiện; SR: (Philippines) Carlos Yulo; VT: (Philippines) Carlos Yulo; PB: (Vietnam) Đinh Phương Thành; HB: (Philippines) Carlos Yulo / (Vietnam) Đinh Phương Thành	TF: Philippines; AA: (Indonesia) Rifda Irfanaluthfi; VT: (Philippines) Aleah Finnegan; UB: (Malaysia) Rachel Yeoh Li Wen; BB: (Malaysia) Rachel Yeoh Li Wen; FX: (Indonesia) Rifda Irfanaluthfi / (Thailand) Sasiwimon Mueangphuan
May 14–22	(France) Normandy	Gymnasiade (2022)	TF: France; AA: (France) Romain Cavallaro; FX: (France) Lorenzo Sainte Rose; PH: (France) Romain Cavallaro / (Kazakhstan) Zeinolla Idrissov; SR: (France) Romain Cavallaro; VT: (France) Lorenzo Sainte Rose; PB: (Chinese Taipei) Chuang Chia-lung; HB: (France) Romain Cavallaro	TF: France; AA: (France) Lea Franceries; VT: (France) Lea Franceries; UB: (Hungary) Mirtill Makovits; BB: (France) Lucie Henna; FX: (France) Lea Franceries
May 15–25	(Australia) Carrara	Oceania Championships	TF: Australia; AA: (Australia) Jesse Moore	TF: Australia; AA: (Australia) Emily Whitehead
May 26–29	(Bulgaria) Varna	FIG World Challenge Cup	FX: (France) Benjamin Osberger; PH: (Cyprus) Marios Georgiou; SR: (Azerbaijan) Nikita Simonov; VT: (Romania) Gabriel Burtănete; PB: (Cyprus) Marios Georgiou; HB: (Cyprus) Marios Georgiou	VT: (France) Aline Friess; UB: (France) Aline Friess; BB: (Croatia) Ana Đerek; FX: (France) Aline Friess
June 9–12	(Croatia) Osijek	FIG World Challenge Cup	FX: (Croatia) Aurel Benović; PH: (Croatia) Robert Seligman; SR: (Turkey) Adem Asil; VT: (Ukraine) Igor Radivilov; PB: (Turkey) Ferhat Arıcan; HB: (Croatia) Tin Srbić	VT: (Bulgaria) Valentina Georgieva; UB: (Hungary) Zója Székely; BB: (Germany) Pauline Schäfer-Betz; FX: (Romania) Ana Bărbosu
June 15–18	(Qatar) Doha	Asian Championships	TF: (China) China; AA: (China) Shi Cong; FX: (Philippines) Carlos Yulo; PH: (Jordan) Ahmad Abu al Soud; SR: (China) Lan Xingyu; VT: (Philippines) Carlos Yulo; PB: (Philippines) Carlos Yulo; HB: (South Korea) Yun Jin-seong	TF: (China) China; AA: (China) Zhang Jin; VT: (South Korea) Yeo Seo-jeong; UB: (China) Wei Xiaoyuan; BB: (China) Wu Ran; FX: (China) Wu Ran
June 16–19	(Slovenia) Koper	FIG World Challenge Cup	FX: (United Kingdom) Harry Hepworth; PH: (Croatia) Mateo Žugec; SR: (Ukraine) Igor Radivilov; VT: (Ukraine) Igor Radivilov; PB: (Ukraine) Petro Pakhniuk; HB: (Australia) Tyson Bull	VT: (Hungary) Zsófia Kóvacs; UB: (Hungary) Zsófia Kóvacs; BB: (Hungary) Zsófia Kóvacs; FX: (Croatia) Ana Đerek
June 24–July 5	(Colombia) Valledupar	Bolivarian Games	TF: Colombia; AA: (Colombia) Andrés Martínez; FX: (Colombia) Andrés Martínez; PH: (Colombia) Andrés Martínez; SR: (Colombia) Kristopher Bohórquez; VT: (Peru) Edward Gonzalez; PB: (Venezuela) Victor Betancourt; HB: (Colombia) Andrés Martínez	TF: Colombia; AA: (Peru) Ana Karina Mendez; VT: (Dominican Republic) Yamilet Peña; UB: (Peru) Ana Karina Mendez; BB: (Ecuador) Alais Perea; FX: (Chile) Franchesca Santi
June 26–29	(Algeria) Oran	Mediterranean Games	TF: (Turkey) Turkey; AA: (Turkey) Adem Asil; FX: (Italy) Nicola Bartolini; PH: (Croatia) Mateo Žugec; SR: (Turkey) İbrahim Çolak; VT: (Turkey) Adem Asil; PB: (Turkey) Ferhat Arıcan; HB: (Cyprus) Marios Georgiou	TF: Italy; AA: (Italy) Martina Maggio; VT: (Italy) Asia D'Amato; UB: (Italy) Giorgia Villa; BB: (Italy) Martina Maggio; FX: (Italy) Asia D'Amato
July 2–3	(Iceland) Kópavogur	Nordic Championships	TF: Sweden; AA: (Denmark) Sofus Heggemsnes; FX: (Finland) Tarmo Kanerva; PH: (Denmark) Sofus Heggemsnes; SR: (Denmark) Jacob Karlsen; VT: (Denmark) Harald Wibye; PB: David Rumbutis; HB: (Denmark) Sofus Heggemsnes	TF: Sweden; AA: (Denmark) Julie Madsø; VT: (Denmark) Camille Rasmussen; UB: Nathalie Westlund; BB: (Iceland) Thelma Adalsteinsdóttir; FX: Alva Eriksson
July 8–11	(Egypt) Cairo	African Championships	TF: (Egypt) Egypt; AA: (Egypt) Mohamed Afify; FX: (Egypt) Omar Mohamed; PH: (Morocco) Abderrazak Nasser; SR: (Egypt) Omar Mohamed; VT: (Egypt) Omar Mohamed; PB: (Egypt) Omar Mohamed; HB: (Egypt) Mohamed Afify	TF: (Egypt) Egypt; AA: (South Africa) Caitlin Rooskrantz; VT: (Egypt) Jana Mahmoud; UB: (South Africa) Caitlin Rooskrantz; BB: (Egypt) Zeina Ibrahim; FX: (Egypt) Jana Mahmoud
July 15–17	(Brazil) Rio de Janeiro	Pan American Championships	TF: (United States) United States; AA: (Brazil) Caio Souza; FX: (United States) Yul Moldauer; PH: (United States) Yul Moldauer; SR: (Brazil) Arthur Zanetti; VT: (Brazil) Caio Souza; PB: (United States) Yul Moldauer; HB: (United States) Brody Malone	TF: (Brazil) Brazil; AA: (Brazil) Flávia Saraiva; VT: (Panama) Karla Navas; UB: (Brazil) Rebeca Andrade; BB: (Brazil) Flávia Saraiva; FX: (United States) Kayla DiCello
July 24–30	(Slovakia) Banská Bystrica	European Youth Summer Olympic Festival	TF: (Italy) Italy; AA: (Ukraine) Radomyr Stelmakh; FX: (United Kingdom) Danny Crouch; PH: (Lithuania) Kristijonas Padegimas; SR: (Sweden) Luis Il-Sung Melander; VT: (Finland) Joona Reiman; PB: (Germany) Jukka Ole Nissinen; HB: (Israel) Dmytro Dotsenko	TF: (Romania) Romania; AA: (Germany) Helen Kevric; VT: (Germany) Helen Kevric; UB: (Italy) Martina Pieratti; BB: (Romania) Amalia Puflea; FX: (Romania) Amalia Puflea
July 28–August 8	(England) Birmingham	Commonwealth Games	TF: England; AA: (England) Jake Jarman; FX: (England) Jake Jarman; PH: (England) Joe Fraser; SR: (England) Courtney Tulloch; VT: (England) Jake Jarman; PB: (England) Joe Fraser; HB: (Cyprus) Ilias Georgiou	TF: England; AA: (Australia) Georgia Godwin; VT: (Australia) Georgia Godwin; UB: (England) Georgia-Mae Fenton; BB: (Australia) Kate McDonald; FX: (England) Alice Kinsella
August 9–18	(Turkey) Konya	Islamic Solidarity Games	TF: (Turkey) Turkey; AA: (Turkey) Adem Asil; FX: (Turkey) Ahmet Önder; PH: (Jordan) Ahmad Abu al Soud; SR: (Turkey) Adem Asil; VT: (Azerbaijan) Nikita Simonov; PB: (Turkey) Ferhat Arıcan; HB: (Turkey) Ahmet Önder	TF: Turkey; AA: Bengisu Yıldız; VT: (Uzbekistan) Oksana Chusovitina; UB: Sevgi Seda Kayışoğlu; BB: (Uzbekistan) Dildora Aripova; FX: (Kazakhstan) Aida Bauyrzhanova
August 11–14	(Germany) Munich	European Championships	—N/a	TF: Italy; AA: Asia D'Amato; VT: (Hungary) Zsófia Kovács; UB: (Germany) Elisabeth Seitz; BB: (Germany) Emma Malewski; FX: (United Kingdom) Jessica Gadirova
August 17–22	(Peru) Lima	South American Championships	TF: Brazil; AA: (Argentina) Santiago Mayol; FX: Yuri Guimarães; PH: (Argentina) Santiago Mayol; SR: (Argentina) Daniel Villafañe; VT: Yuri Guimarães; PB: (Colombia) Jossimar Calvo; HB: (Colombia) Jossimar Calvo	TF: Brazil; AA: Luisa Maia; VT: (Argentina) Lucila Estarli; UB: Thais Fidelis; BB: (Argentina) Abigail Magistrati; FX: (Argentina) Milagros Curti
August 18–21	(Germany) Munich	European Championships	TF: (United Kingdom) Great Britain; AA: (United Kingdom) Joe Fraser; FX: (Israel) Artem Dolgopyat; PH: (Armenia) Harutyun Merdinyan; SR: (Greece) Eleftherios Petrounias; VT: (United Kingdom) Jake Jarman; PB: (United Kingdom) Joe Fraser; HB: (Cyprus) Marios Georgiou	—N/a
September 24–25	(France) Paris	FIG World Challenge Cup	FX: (Republic of Ireland) Eamon Montgomery; PH: (Republic of Ireland) Rhys McClenaghan; SR: (Turkey) Adem Asil; VT: (Turkey) Adem Asil; PB: (Brazil) Caio Souza; HB: (United States) Brody Malone	VT: (United States) Jade Carey; UB: (United States) Shilese Jones; BB: (France) Marine Boyer; FX: (United States) Jordan Chiles
September 30–October 2	(Hungary) Szombathely	FIG World Challenge Cup	FX: (Ukraine) Illia Kovtun; PH: (Kazakhstan) Nariman Kurbanov; SR: (Austria) Vinzenz Höck; VT: (Chinese Taipei) Tseng Wei-sheng; PB: (Ukraine) Illia Kovtun; HB: (Hungary) Krisztofer Mészáros	VT: (United States) Addison Fatta; UB: (Hungary) Zója Székely; BB: (Finland) Maisa Kuusikko; FX: (United States) Katelyn Jong
October 1–15	(Paraguay) Asunción	South American Games	TF: Brazil; AA: Caio Souza; FX: Arthur Mariano; PH: (Colombia) Andrés Martínez; SR: (Argentina) Daniel Villafañe; VT: Caio Souza; PB: (Colombia) Jossimar Calvo; HB: Caio Souza	TF: Brazil; AA: Júlia Soares; VT: (Chile) Makarena Pinto; UB: Carolyne Pedro; BB: Júlia Soares; FX: Júlia Soares
October 7–9	(Turkey) Mersin	FIG World Challenge Cup	FX: (Kazakhstan) Dmitriy Patanin; PH: (Chinese Taipei) Shiao Yu-jan; SR: (Turkey) Adem Asil; VT: (Romania) Gabriel Burtănete; PB: (Turkey) Ferhat Arıcan; HB: (Lithuania) Robert Tvorogal	VT: (Slovenia) Teja Belak; UB: (Romania) Ana Bărbosu; BB: (Romania) Ana Bărbosu; FX: (Romania) Ana Bărbosu
October 29–November 6	(United Kingdom) Liverpool	World Championships	TF: China; AA: (Japan) Daiki Hashimoto; FX: (United Kingdom) Giarnni Regini-Moran; PH: (Republic of Ireland) Rhys McClenaghan; SR: (Turkey) Adem Asil; VT: (Armenia) Artur Davtyan; PB: (China) Zou Jingyuan; HB: (United States) Brody Malone	TF: United States; AA: (Brazil) Rebeca Andrade; VT: (United States) Jade Carey; UB: (China) Wei Xiaoyuan; BB: (Japan) Hazuki Watanabe; FX: (United Kingdom) Jessica Gadirova
November 19–20	(Finland) Jyväskylä	Northern European Championships	TF: Finland; AA: (Finland) Robert Kirmes; FX: (Finland) Robert Kirmes; PH: (Scotland) Cameron Lynn; SR: (Finland) Elias Koski; VT: (Finland) Joona Reiman; PB: (Finland) Joona Reiman; HB: (Finland) Elias Koski	TF: Wales; AA: (Finland) Kaia Tanskanen; VT: (Wales) Ruby Evans; UB: (Wales) Jea Maracha / (Norway) Julie Erichsen; BB: (Republic of Ireland) Halle Hilton; FX: (Finland) Kaia Tanskanen

=== Postponed and cancelled events ===
Due to the COVID-19 pandemic, some events were postponed to 2023.

Scheduled Date	Location	Event	Status	Ref
June 26–July 7	(China) Chengdu	World University Games	Postponed (2023)	
August 26–September 6	(Egypt) Cairo	African Youth Games	Unknown	
September 10–25	(China) Hangzhou	Asian Games	Postponed (2023)	
October 27–November 13	Guatemala City	Central American Games	Cancelled	
November 26–December 6	(China) Jinjiang	Gymnasiade (2020)	Unknown	
December 20–28	(China) Shantou	Asian Youth Games	Cancelled	

== Medalists ==
=== Women ===
==== International ====
Competition	Event	Gold	Silver	Bronze
World Championships	Team	United States	Great Britain	Canada
World Championships	All-Around	(Brazil) Rebeca Andrade	(United States) Shilese Jones	(United Kingdom) Jessica Gadirova
World Championships	Vault	(United States) Jade Carey	(United States) Jordan Chiles	(France) Coline Devillard
World Championships	Uneven Bars	(China) Wei Xiaoyuan	(United States) Shilese Jones	(Belgium) Nina Derwael
World Championships	Balance Beam	(Japan) Hazuki Watanabe	(Canada) Ellie Black	(Japan) Shoko Miyata
World Championships	Floor Exercise	(United Kingdom) Jessica Gadirova	(United States) Jordan Chiles	(Brazil) Rebeca Andrade (United States) Jade Carey

==== Major events ====
Competition	Event	Gold	Silver	Bronze
Southeast Asian Games	Team	Philippines	Vietnam	Singapore
Southeast Asian Games	All-Around	(Indonesia) Rifda Irfanaluthfi	(Philippines) Aleah Finnegan	(Malaysia) Rachel Yeoh Li Wen
Southeast Asian Games	Vault	(Philippines) Aleah Finnegan	(Vietnam) Nguyễn Thị Quỳnh Như	(Indonesia) Rifda Irfanaluthfi
Southeast Asian Games	Uneven Bars	(Malaysia) Rachel Yeoh Li Wen	(Vietnam) Phạm Như Phương	(Singapore) Nadine Joy Nathan
Southeast Asian Games	Balance Beam	(Malaysia) Rachel Yeoh Li Wen	(Philippines) Aleah Finnegan	(Vietnam) Phạm Như Phương
Southeast Asian Games	Floor Exercise	(Indonesia) Rifda Irfanaluthfi (Thailand) Sasiwimon Mueangphuan	—N/a	(Vietnam) Phạm Như Phương
Oceania Championships	Team	Australia	—N/a	
Oceania Championships	All-Around	(Australia) Emily Whitehead	(Australia) Breanna Scott	(New Zealand) Reece Cobb
Asian Championships	Team	China	South Korea	Japan
Asian Championships	All-Around	(China) Zhang Jin	(China) Tang Xijing	(South Korea) Lee Yun-seo
Asian Championships	Vault	(South Korea) Yeo Seo-jeong	(Japan) Shoko Miyata	(India) Pranati Nayak
Asian Championships	Uneven Bars	(China) Wei Xiaoyuan	(China) Tang Xijing	(South Korea) Lee Yun-seo
Asian Championships	Balance Beam	(China) Wu Ran	(Japan) Arisa Kasahara	(China) Zhang Jin
Asian Championships	Floor Exercise	(China) Wu Ran	(Japan) Shoko Miyata	(South Korea) Lee Yun-seo
Bolivarian Games	Team	Colombia	Peru	Panama
Bolivarian Games	All-around	(Peru) Ana Karina Mendez	(Ecuador) Alais Perea	(Panama) Hillary Heron
Bolivarian Games	Vault	(Dominican Republic) Yamilet Peña	(Panama) Karla Navas	(Panama) Hillary Heron
Bolivarian Games	Uneven Bars	(Peru) Ana Karina Mendez	(Colombia) Daira Lamadrid	(Chile) Franchesca Santi
Bolivarian Games	Balance Beam	(Ecuador) Alais Perea	(El Salvador) Alexa Grande	(Panama) Karla Navas
Bolivarian Games	Floor Exercise	(Chile) Franchesca Santi	(Panama) Hillary Heron	(Colombia) Laura Pardo
Mediterranean Games	Team	Italy	France	Spain
Mediterranean Games	All-Around	(Italy) Martina Maggio	(Italy) Asia D'Amato	(France) Carolann Héduit
Mediterranean Games	Vault	(Italy) Asia D'Amato	(France) Morgane Osyssek-Reimer	(Italy) Angela Andreoli
Mediterranean Games	Uneven Bars	(Italy) Giorgia Villa	(Italy) Martina Maggio	(Portugal) Ana Filipa Martins
Mediterranean Games	Balance Beam	(Italy) Martina Maggio	(Italy) Asia D'Amato	(France) Carolann Héduit
Mediterranean Games	Floor Exercise	(Italy) Asia D'Amato	(Italy) Martina Maggio	(France) Morgane Osyssek-Reimer
African Championships	Team	Egypt	South Africa	Algeria
African Championships	All-Around	(South Africa) Caitlin Rooskrantz	(Egypt) Jana Aboelhasan	(Egypt) Jana Abdelsalam
African Championships	Vault	(Egypt) Jana Mahmoud	(Egypt) Nancy Taman	(South Africa) Naveen Daries
African Championships	Uneven Bars	(South Africa) Caitlin Rooskrantz	(Egypt) Zeina Ibrahim	(South Africa) Naveen Daries
African Championships	Balance Beam	(Egypt) Zeina Ibrahim	(Egypt) Jana Aboelhasan	(South Africa) Caitlin Rooskrantz
African Championships	Floor Exercise	(Egypt) Jana Mahmoud	(Egypt) Jana Aboelhasan	(South Africa) Garcelle Napier
Pan American Championships	Team	Brazil	United States	Canada
Pan American Championships	All-Around	(Brazil) Flávia Saraiva	(United States) Lexi Zeiss	(United States) Skye Blakely
Pan American Championships	Vault	(Panama) Karla Navas	(Mexico) Natalia Escalera	(Mexico) Ahtziri Sandoval
Pan American Championships	Uneven Bars	(Brazil) Rebeca Andrade	(United States) Zoe Miller	(Canada) Sydney Turner
Pan American Championships	Balance Beam	(Brazil) Flávia Saraiva	(Brazil) Rebeca Andrade	(United States) Lexi Zeiss
Pan American Championships	Floor Exercise	(United States) Kayla DiCello	(Brazil) Flávia Saraiva	(United States) Skye Blakely
Commonwealth Games	Team	England	Australia	Canada
Commonwealth Games	All-Around	(Australia) Georgia Godwin	(England) Ondine Achampong	(Canada) Emma Spence
Commonwealth Games	Vault	(Australia) Georgia Godwin	(Canada) Laurie Denommée	(Scotland) Shannon Archer
Commonwealth Games	Uneven Bars	(England) Georgia-Mae Fenton	(Australia) Georgia Godwin	(South Africa) Caitlin Rooskrantz
Commonwealth Games	Balance Beam	(Australia) Kate McDonald	(Australia) Georgia Godwin	(Canada) Emma Spence
Commonwealth Games	Floor Exercise	(England) Alice Kinsella	(England) Ondine Achampong	(Australia) Emily Whitehead
European Championships	Team	Italy	(United Kingdom) Great Britain	Germany
European Championships	All-Around	(Italy) Asia D'Amato	(United Kingdom) Alice Kinsella	(Italy) Martina Maggio
European Championships	Vault	(Hungary) Zsófia Kovács	(Italy) Asia D'Amato	(France) Aline Friess
European Championships	Uneven Bars	(Germany) Elisabeth Seitz	(Italy) Alice D'Amato	(France) Lorette Charpy
European Championships	Balance Beam	(Germany) Emma Malewski	(United Kingdom) Ondine Achampong	(France) Carolann Héduit
European Championships	Floor Exercise	(United Kingdom) Jessica Gadirova	(Italy) Martina Maggio	(Italy) Angela Andreoli
South American Games	Team	Brazil	Argentina	Colombia
South American Games	All-Around	(Brazil) Júlia Soares	(Brazil) Carolyne Pedro	(Argentina) Brisa Carraro
South American Games	Vault	(Chile) Makarena Pinto	(Panama) Hillary Heron	(Chile) Franchesca Santi
South American Games	Uneven Bars	(Brazil) Carolyne Pedro	(Argentina) Brisa Carraro	(Colombia) Ginna Escobar
South American Games	Balance Beam	(Brazil) Júlia Soares	(Argentina) Brisa Carraro	(Peru) Ana Mendez
South American Games	Floor Exercise	(Brazil) Júlia Soares	(Brazil) Carolyne Pedro	(Panama) Hillary Heron

=== Men ===
==== International ====
Competition	Event	Gold	Silver	Bronze
World Championships	Team	China	Japan	Great Britain
World Championships	All-Around	(Japan) Daiki Hashimoto	(China) Zhang Boheng	(Japan) Wataru Tanigawa
World Championships	Floor Exercise	(United Kingdom) Giarnni Regini-Moran	(Japan) Daiki Hashimoto	(Japan) Ryosuke Doi
World Championships	Pommel Horse	(Republic of Ireland) Rhys McClenaghan	(Jordan) Ahmad Abu al Soud	(Armenia) Harutyun Merdinyan
World Championships	Rings	(Turkey) Adem Asil	(China) Zou Jingyuan	(United Kingdom) Courtney Tulloch
World Championships	Vault	(Armenia) Artur Davtyan	(Philippines) Carlos Yulo	(Ukraine) Igor Radivilov
World Championships	Parallel Bars	(China) Zou Jingyuan	(Germany) Lukas Dauser	(Philippines) Carlos Yulo
World Championships	Horizontal Bar	(United States) Brody Malone	(Japan) Daiki Hashimoto	(Brazil) Arthur Mariano

==== Major events ====
Competition	Event	Gold	Silver	Bronze
Southeast Asian Games	Team	Vietnam	Philippines	Singapore
Southeast Asian Games	All-Around	(Philippines) Carlos Yulo	(Vietnam) Lê Thanh Tùng	(Vietnam) Đinh Phương Thành
Southeast Asian Games	Floor Exercise	(Philippines) Carlos Yulo	(Singapore) Terry Wei-An Tay	(Vietnam) Trịnh Hải Khang
Southeast Asian Games	Pommel Horse	(Vietnam) Đặng Ngọc Xuân Thiện	(Malaysia) Tan Fu Jie	(Malaysia) Muhammad Sharul Aimy
Southeast Asian Games	Rings	(Philippines) Carlos Yulo	(Vietnam) Nguyễn Văn Khánh Phong	(Vietnam) Lê Thanh Tùng
Southeast Asian Games	Vault	(Philippines) Carlos Yulo	(Thailand) Tikumporn Surintornta	(Philippines) Juancho Miguel Besana
Southeast Asian Games	Parallel Bars	(Vietnam) Đinh Phương Thành	(Philippines) Carlos Yulo	(Vietnam) Lê Thanh Tùng
Southeast Asian Games	Horizontal Bar	(Philippines) Carlos Yulo (Vietnam) Đinh Phương Thành	—N/a	(Vietnam) Lê Thanh Tùng
Oceania Championships	Team	Australia	New Zealand	—N/a
Oceania Championships	All-Around	(Australia) Jesse Moore	(New Zealand) Mikhail Koudinov	(Australia) Clay Stephens
Asian Championships	Team	China	Japan	Chinese Taipei
Asian Championships	All-Around	(China) Shi Cong	(Philippines) Carlos Yulo	(China) Yang Jiaxing
Asian Championships	Floor Exercise	(Philippines) Carlos Yulo	(South Korea) Kim Han-sol	(China) Yang Jiaxing
Asian Championships	Pommel Horse	(Jordan) Ahmad Abu al Soud	(Kazakhstan) Nariman Kurbanov	(China) Yin Dehang
Asian Championships	Rings	(China) Lan Xingyu	(Iran) Mehdi Ahmad-Kohani	(Chinese Taipei) Lin Guan-yi
Asian Championships	Vault	(Philippines) Carlos Yulo	(Japan) Shiga Tachibana	(South Korea) Kim Han-sol
Asian Championships	Parallel Bars	(Philippines) Carlos Yulo	(Japan) Tsuyoshi Hasegawa	(China) Yin Dehang
Asian Championships	Horizontal Bar	(South Korea) Yun Jin-seong	(China) Lin Chaopan	(Kazakhstan) Milad Karimi
Bolivarian Games	Team	Colombia	Peru	Ecuador
Bolivarian Games	All-around	(Colombia) Andrés Martínez	(Colombia) Dilan Jiménez	(Peru) Edward Gonzalez
Bolivarian Games	Floor Exercise	(Colombia) Andrés Martínez	(Ecuador) Israel Chiriboga	(Chile) Joel Alvarez
Bolivarian Games	Pommel Horse	(Colombia) Andrés Martínez	(Colombia) José Martínez	(Venezuela) Victor Betancourt
Bolivarian Games	Rings	(Colombia) Kristopher Bohórquez	(Colombia) Dilan Jiménez	(Ecuador) Cesar Lopez
Bolivarian Games	Vault	(Peru) Edward Gonzalez	(Venezuela) Edwar Rolin	(Colombia) Dilan Jiménez
Bolivarian Games	Parallel Bars	(Venezuela) Victor Betancourt	(Colombia) Dilan Jiménez	(Venezuela) Edwar Rolin
Bolivarian Games	Horizontal Bar	(Colombia) Andrés Martínez	(Venezuela) Edwar Rolin	(Chile) Joel Alvarez
Mediterranean Games	Team	Turkey	Italy	France
Mediterranean Games	All-Around	(Turkey) Adem Asil	(Spain) Joel Plata	(Cyprus) Marios Georgiou
Mediterranean Games	Floor Exercise	(Italy) Nicola Bartolini	(Turkey) Ahmet Önder	(Turkey) Adem Asil
Mediterranean Games	Pommel Horse	(Croatia) Mateo Žugec	(Croatia) Jakov Vlahek	(Turkey) Ferhat Arıcan
Mediterranean Games	Rings	(Turkey) İbrahim Çolak	(Turkey) Adem Asil	(Egypt) Ali Zahran
Mediterranean Games	Vault	(Turkey) Adem Asil	(Italy) Nicola Bartolini	(Italy) Matteo Levantesi
Mediterranean Games	Parallel Bars	(Turkey) Ferhat Arıcan	(Italy) Matteo Levantesi	(France) Cameron-Lie Bernard
Mediterranean Games	Horizontal Bar	(Cyprus) Marios Georgiou	(Turkey) Adem Asil	(Turkey) Ahmet Önder
African Championships	Team	Egypt	Algeria	South Africa
African Championships	All-Around	(Egypt) Mohamed Afify	(Egypt) Omar Mohamed	(Algeria) Hilal Metidji
African Championships	Floor Exercise	(Egypt) Omar Mohamed	(South Africa) Luke James	(South Africa) Muhammad-Khaalid Mia
African Championships	Pommel Horse	(Morocco) Abderrazak Nasser	(Egypt) Abdelrahman Abdelhaleem	(Morocco) Zakariae Setti
African Championships	Rings	(Egypt) Omar Mohamed	(Egypt) Mohamed Afify	(Algeria) Hilal Metidji
African Championships	Vault	(Egypt) Omar Mohamed	(Morocco) Achraf Quistas	(Morocco) Abderrazak Nasser
African Championships	Parallel Bars	(Egypt) Omar Mohamed	(Algeria) Hilal Metidji	(Egypt) Mohamed Afify
African Championships	Horizontal Bar	(Egypt) Mohamed Afify	(Algeria) Hilal Metidji	(Algeria) Djaber Hmida
Pan American Championships	Team	United States	Brazil	Canada
Pan American Championships	All-Around	(Brazil) Caio Souza	(United States) Yul Moldauer	(Canada) Félix Dolci
Pan American Championships	Floor Exercise	(United States) Yul Moldauer	(United States) Riley Loos	(Canada) Félix Dolci
Pan American Championships	Pommel Horse	(United States) Yul Moldauer	(Canada) Jayson Rampersad	(Colombia) Andrés Martínez
Pan American Championships	Rings	(Brazil) Arthur Zanetti	(Brazil) Caio Souza	(United States) Riley Loos
Pan American Championships	Vault	(Brazil) Caio Souza	(Canada) Félix Dolci	(Argentina) Daniel Villafañe
Pan American Championships	Parallel Bars	(United States) Yul Moldauer	(United States) Colt Walker	(Brazil) Caio Souza
Pan American Championships	Horizontal Bar	(United States) Brody Malone	(Brazil) Caio Souza	(Brazil) Arthur Mariano
Commonwealth Games	Team	England	Canada	Cyprus
Commonwealth Games	All-Around	(England) Jake Jarman	(England) James Hall	(Cyprus) Marios Georgiou
Commonwealth Games	Floor Exercise	(England) Jake Jarman	(Canada) Félix Dolci	(England) Giarnni Regini-Moran
Commonwealth Games	Pommel Horse	(England) Joe Fraser	(Northern Ireland) Rhys McClenaghan	(Canada) Jayson Rampersand
Commonwealth Games	Rings	(England) Courtney Tulloch	(Cyprus) Sokratis Pilakouris	(Canada) Chris Kaji
Commonwealth Games	Vault	(England) Jake Jarman	(England) Giarnni Regini-Moran	(Australia) James Bacueti
Commonwealth Games	Parallel Bars	(England) Joe Fraser	(England) Giarnni Regini-Moran	(Cyprus) Marios Georgiou
Commonwealth Games	Horizontal Bar	(Cyprus) Ilias Georgiou	(Australia) Tyson Bull	(Cyprus) Marios Georgiou
European Championships	Team	(United Kingdom) Great Britain	Italy	Turkey
European Championships	All-Around	(United Kingdom) Joe Fraser	(Turkey) Ahmet Önder	(Turkey) Adem Asil
European Championships	Floor Exercise	(Israel) Artem Dolgopyat	(Hungary) Krisztofer Mészáros	(United Kingdom) Jake Jarman
European Championships	Pommel Horse	(Armenia) Harutyun Merdinyan	(Netherlands) Loran de Munck	(Germany) Nils Dunkel
European Championships	Rings	(Greece) Eleftherios Petrounias	(Turkey) Adem Asil	(United Kingdom) Courtney Tulloch
European Championships	Vault	(United Kingdom) Jake Jarman	(Armenia) Artur Davtyan	(Ukraine) Igor Radivilov
European Championships	Parallel Bars	(United Kingdom) Joe Fraser	(Ukraine) Illia Kovtun	(United Kingdom) Giarnni Regini-Moran
European Championships	Horizontal Bar	(Cyprus) Marios Georgiou	(Lithuania) Robert Tvorogal	(Spain) Joel Plata
South American Games	Team	Brazil	Argentina	Colombia
South American Games	All-Around	(Brazil) Caio Souza	(Brazil) Lucas Bitencourt	(Colombia) Jossimar Calvo
South American Games	Floor Exercise	(Brazil) Arthur Mariano	(Colombia) Jossimar Calvo	(Argentina) Santiago Agostinelli
South American Games	Pommel Horse	(Colombia) Andrés Martínez	(Argentina) Santiago Mayol	(Venezuela) Adickxon Trejo
South American Games	Rings	(Argentina) Daniel Villafañe	(Colombia) Kristopher Bohórquez	(Colombia) Dilan Jiménez
South American Games	Vault	(Brazil) Caio Souza	(Argentina) Daniel Villafañe	(Chile) Josué Armijo
South American Games	Parallel Bars	(Colombia) Jossimar Calvo	(Brazil) Caio Souza	(Colombia) Dilan Jiménez
South American Games	Horizontal Bar	(Brazil) Caio Souza	(Chile) Joel Álvarez	(Brazil) Diogo Soares

== Season's best international scores ==
Note: Only the scores of senior gymnasts from international events have been included below. Only one score per gymnast is included.

=== Women ===
==== All-around ====
Rank	Name	Country	Score	Event
1	Rebeca Andrade	Brazil	57.332	World Championships QF
2	Jordan Chiles	United States	55.883	World Championships TF
3	Shilese Jones	United States	55.766	World Championships QF
4	Konnor McClain	United States	55.665	DTB Pokal TF
5	Zhang Jin	China	55.400	Asian Championships AA
6	Flávia Saraiva	Brazil	55.399	Pan American Championships AA
7	Asia D'Amato	Italy	55.199	European Championships TF
7	Jessica Gadirova	Great Britain	55.199	World Championships AA
9	Ellie Black	Canada	55.166	World Championships TF
10	Jade Carey	United States	55.132	World Championships QF
11	Alice Kinsella	Great Britain	55.065	World Championships AA
12	Martina Maggio	Italy	54.864	Mediterranean Games AA
13	Ou Yushan	China	54.566	World Championships QF
14	Alice D'Amato	Italy	54.366	World Championships QF
15	Lexi Zeiss	United States	54.199	Pan American Championships AA
16	Shoko Miyata	Japan	54.166	World Championships QF
17	Naomi Visser	Netherlands	54.165	World Championships QF
18	Tang Xijing	China	53.967	Asian Championships AA
19	Mélanie de Jesus dos Santos	France	53.865	World Championships QF
20	Veronica Mandriota	Italy	53.733	City of Jesolo Trophy AA

==== Vault ====
Rank	Name	Country	Score	Event
1	Jade Carey	United States	14.516	World Championships EF
2	Jordan Chiles	United States	14.350	World Championships EF
3	Coline Devillard	France	14.299	World Championships QF
4	Yeo Seo-jeong	South Korea	14.249	World Championships QF
5	Jessica Gadirova	Great Britain	14.200	World Championships QF
6	Ellie Black	Canada	14.116	World Championships EF
7	Shoko Miyata	Japan	13.999	World Championships EF
8	Asia D'Amato	Italy	13.967	City of Jesolo Trophy QF
9	Zsófia Kovács	Hungary	13.933	European Championships EF
10	Teja Belak	Slovenia	13.875	Mersin Challenge Cup EF

==== Uneven bars ====
Rank	Name	Country	Score	Event
1	Wei Xiaoyuan	China	15.000	Asian Championships QF
2	Rebeca Andrade	Brazil	14.967	Pan American Championships EF
3	Luo Rui	China	14.900	World Championships QF
4	Shilese Jones	United States	14.766	World Championships EF
5	Nina Derwael	Belgium	14.700	World Championships QF
5	Viktoria Listunova	Russian athlete	14.700	Doha World Cup QF
5	Kaylia Nemour	Algeria	14.700	Arab Championships EF
5	Tang Xijing	China	14.700	Asian Championships EF
9	Alice D'Amato	Italy	14.633	European Championships TF
10	Naomi Visser	Netherlands	14.566	Baku World Cup QF

==== Balance beam ====
Rank	Name	Country	Score	Event
1	Wu Ran	China	14.633	Asian Championships EF
2	Flávia Saraiva	Brazil	14.433	Pan American Championships AA
3	Ou Yushan	China	14.266	World Championships TF
4	Zhang Jin	China	14.200	Asian Championships QF
5	Rebeca Andrade	Brazil	14.133	Pan American Championships TF
6	Sun Xinyi	China	14.100	Asian Championships QF
7	Konnor McClain	United States	14.033	DTB Pokal EF
8	Martina Maggio	Italy	14.000	DTB Pokal TF
9	Ana Bărbosu	Romania	13.950	Mersin Challenge Cup EF
10	Arisa Kasahara	Japan	13.833	Asian Championships EF
10	Ellie Black	Canada	13.833	World Championships TF

==== Floor exercise ====
Rank	Name	Country	Score	Event
1	Rebeca Andrade	Brazil	14.400	World Championships AA
1	Jessica Gadirova	Great Britain	14.400	World Championships AA
3	Flávia Saraiva	Brazil	14.200	World Championships QF
4	Jade Carey	United States	14.166	World Championships AA
5	Jordan Chiles	United States	14.100	World Championships QF
6	Martina Maggio	Italy	13.966	World Championships TF
7	Konnor McClain	United States	13.900	City of Jesolo Trophy EF
8	Angela Andreoli	Italy	13.866	European Championships EF
9	Emjae Frazier	United States	13.850	City of Jesolo Trophy EF
10	Wu Ran	China	13.833	Asian Championships QF

=== Men ===
==== All-around ====
Rank	Name	Country	Score	Event
1	Daiki Hashimoto	Japan	87.198	World Championships AA
2	Zhang Boheng	China	86.765	World Championships AA
3	Joe Fraser	Great Britain	85.565	European Championships AA
4	Wataru Tanigawa	Japan	85.231	World Championships AA
5	Ahmet Önder	Turkey	85.131	European Championships AA
6	Brody Malone	United States	84.931	World Championships AA
7	Adem Asil	Turkey	84.900	Islamic Solidarity Games AA
8	Carlos Yulo	Philippines	84.664	World Championships QF
9	Shi Cong	China	83.833	Asian Championships AA
10	Caio Souza	Brazil	83.735	Pan American Championships TF
11	Yang Jiaxing	China	83.733	Asian Championships AA
12	Joel Plata	Spain	83.731	European Championships AA
13	Jake Jarman	Great Britain	83.450	Commonwealth Games AA
14	Asher Hong	United States	83.299	World Championships QF
15	Yin Dehang	China	83.199	Asian Championships AA
16	Nicola Bartolini	Italy	83.150	Mediterranean Games TF
17	Noe Seifert	Switzerland	83.031	European Championships AA
18	Krisztofer Mészáros	Hungary	82.999	European Championships AA
19	Koki Maeda	Japan	82.932	Asian Championships AA
20	James Hall	Great Britain	82.900	Commonwealth Games AA

==== Floor exercise ====
Rank	Name	Country	Score	Event
1	Carlos Yulo	Philippines	15.266	World Championships QF
2	Artem Dolgopyat	Israel	15.150	Szombathely Challenge Cup QF
3	Nicola Bartolini	Italy	14.850	Mediterranean Games EF
4	Ryosuke Doi	Japan	14.766	World Championships QF
5	Dmitry Patanin	Kazakhstan	14.750	Mersin Challenge Cup QF
6	Milad Karimi	Kazakhstan	14.733	World Championships QF
6	Illia Kovtun	Ukraine	14.733	Szombathely Challenge Cup EF
8	Daiki Hashimoto	Japan	14.666	World Championships AA
8	Jake Jarman	Great Britain	14.666	Commonwealth Games EF
10	Krisztofer Mészáros	Hungary	14.600	European Championships EF

==== Pommel horse ====
Rank	Name	Country	Score	Event
1	Nariman Kurbanov	Kazakhstan	15.300	Szombathely Challenge Cup QF
1	Rhys McClenaghan	Ireland	15.300	World Championships EF
3	Ahmad Abu al Soud	Jordan	15.233	Asian Championships EF
3	Stephen Nedoroscik	United States	15.233	World Championships QF
5	Lee Chih-kai	Chinese Taipei	15.100	Asian Championships QF
6	Shiao Yu-jan	Chinese Taipei	15.050	Mersin Challenge Cup EF
7	Khoi Young	United States	15.000	DTB Pokal EF
8	Ryota Tsumura	Japan	14.900	Paris Challenge Cup QF
9	Joe Fraser	Great Britain	14.833	Commonwealth Games EF
9	Loran de Munck	Netherlands	14.833	World Championships QF

==== Rings ====
Rank	Name	Country	Score	Event
1	Eleftherios Petrounias	Greece	15.133	European Championships EF
2	Adem Asil	Turkey	15.033	European Championships EF
3	İbrahim Çolak	Turkey	15.000	Osijek Challenge Cup QF
4	Lan Xingyu	China	14.900	Asian Championships QF
5	Vinzenz Höck	Austria	14.866	European Championships QF
5	Courtney Tulloch	Great Britain	14.866	European Championships EF
5	Zou Jingyuan	China	14.866	World Championships TF
8	Nikita Simonov	Azerbaijan	14.850	Islamic Solidarity Games EF
9	Vahagn Davtyan	Armenia	14.800	Cairo World Cup EF
9	Salvatore Maresca	Italy	14.800	Baku World Cup QF

==== Vault ====
Rank	Name	Country	Score	Event
1	Artur Davtyan	Armenia	15.149	European Championships QF
2	Adem Asil	Turkey	15.125	Swiss Cup
3	Nazar Chepurnyi	Ukraine	15.016	Baku World Cup EF
4	Jake Jarman	Great Britain	14.983	European Championships EF
5	Igor Radivilov	Ukraine	14.950	Osijek Challenge Cup QF
5	Carlos Yulo	Philippines	14.950	World Championships EF
7	Andrey Medvedev	Israel	14.933	Doha World Cup QF
8	Khoi Young	United States	14.916	DTB Pokal EF
9	Caio Souza	Brazil	14.833	Pan American Championships EF
10	Gabriel Burtănete	Romania	14.733	European Championships QF

==== Parallel bars ====
Rank	Name	Country	Score	Event
1	Zou Jingyuan	China	16.166	World Championships EF
2	Lukas Dauser	Germany	15.533	European Championships TF
3	Yuya Kamoto	Japan	15.433	World Championships QF
4	Ferhat Arıcan	Turkey	15.400	Osijek Challenge Cup QF
5	Carlos Yulo	Philippines	15.366	World Championships EF
6	Joe Fraser	Great Britain	15.333	European Championships EF
6	Illia Kovtun	Ukraine	15.333	Baku World Cup EF
8	Jossimar Calvo	Colombia	15.166	World Championships QF
9	Ahmet Önder	Turkey	15.150	Mediterranean Games QF
10	Đinh Phương Thành	Vietnam	15.133	Southeast Asian Games EF

==== Horizontal bar ====
Rank	Name	Country	Score	Event
1	Daiki Hashimoto	Japan	15.100	World Championships QF
2	Sun Wei	China	14.833	World Championships QF
3	Brody Malone	United States	14.800	World Championships EF
4	Zhang Boheng	China	14.733	World Championships QF
5	Ryosuke Doi	Japan	14.700	World Championships TF
6	Joe Fraser	Great Britain	14.500	Commonwealth Games TF
7	Ilias Georgiou	Cyprus	14.466	Commonwealth Games EF
7	Milad Karimi	Kazakhstan	14.466	Cottbus World Cup QF
7	Arthur Mariano	Brazil	14.466	World Championships EF
10	Marios Georgiou	Cyprus	14.450	Varna Challenge Cup QF
