= Mammule Rankoe =

South African artistic gymnast

- Born: 22 August 1999 (age 27) South Africa

Gymnastics career
- Discipline: Women's artistic gymnastics
- Country represented: South Africa
- Gym: Johannesburg Gymnastics Centre
- Retired: 2022
Medal record
Women's artistic gymnastics
Representing South Africa
African Championships
| Silver medal – second place | 2022 Cairo | Team |

Mammule Rankoe (born 22 August 1999) is a South African former artistic gymnast. She represented her country at the 2014 Summer Youth Olympics, the 2019 World Championships, and the 2022 Commonwealth Games.

== Gymnastics career ==
Rankoe began gymnastics when she was eight years old.

=== Junior ===
Rankoe won a silver medal with the South African team at the 2012 African Championships, and she placed fifth in the balance beam final. At the 2013 Serbia Memorial Cup, she won the all-around silver medal and won a gold medal on the uneven bars. She won the silver medal in the all-around at the 2014 African Junior Championships behind Egypt's Nada Ayman Ibrahim, and she helped South Africa win the team silver medal behind Egypt. She was then selected to represent South Africa at the 2014 Summer Youth Olympics. There, she finished 33rd in the all-around during the qualification round and did not advance into any finals.

=== Senior ===
Rankoe became age-eligible for senior international competitions in 2015. She placed fifth in the all-around at the 2015 South African Championships. She missed the rest of the 2015 season due to a shoulder cyst. She returned to competition at the 2016 South African Championships and won bronze medals on the balance beam and floor exercise. She competed on the uneven bars and the balance beam at the 2017 Koper World Challenge Cup but did not advance into the finals.

Rankoe won the all-around silver medal at the 2019 South African Championships behind Naveen Daries. She then competed at the 2019 Guimaraes World Challenge Cup and finished seventh in the uneven bars final. She was selected to compete at the 2019 World Championships, and she placed 133rd in the all-around during the qualification round.

Rankoe placed fifth in the all-around at the 2021 African Championships and did not win an Olympic berth. She finished fifth in the balance beam final at the 2022 African Championships and won a silver medal with the South African team. She was then selected to represent South Africa at the 2022 Commonwealth Games and helped the team place fourth. She announced her retirement after the Commonwealth Games.
