= Jana Abdelsalam =

Egyptian artistic gymnast (born 2005)

Jana Abdelsalam جانا عبد السلام
- Full name: Jana Abdelsalam
- Born: 3 January 2006 (age 20) Cairo, Egypt

Gymnastics career
- Discipline: Women's artistic gymnastics
- Country represented: Egypt; (2019–present)
- Head coach: Mahmoud Sayed
- Assistant coach: Salma Al-Saeed
Medal record
Representing Egypt
African Championships
Gold medal – first place	2022 Cairo	Team
Silver medal – second place	2023 Pretoria	Team
Bronze medal – third place	2022 Cairo	All-Around
Bronze medal – third place	2023 Pretoria	All-Around
Bronze medal – third place	2026 Yaoundé	Team
Bronze medal – third place	2026 Yaoundé	Balance beam

Jana Abdelsalam (Arabic: جانا عبد السلام, born 3 January 2006) is an Egyptian artistic gymnast. She was a member of the team who won gold at the 2022 African Championships.

== Personal life ==
Abdelsalam was born in Cairo in 2006.

== Gymnastics career ==
=== 2019 ===
Abdelsalam competed at the 2019 Junior Mediterranean Championships where she placed seventh in the all-around and helped Egypt finish fourth as a team. She won silver on the uneven bars behind Kaylia Nemour.

=== 2022 ===
Abdelsalam competed at the 2022 Mediterranean Games. She helped Egypt place sixth as a team. She next competed at the African Championships where she helped Egypt place first as a team and qualify to the upcoming World Championships. Individually she placed third in the all-around behind Caitlin Rooskrantz of South Africa and teammate Jana Aboelhasan. At the World Championships Abdelsalam helped Egypt finish twenty-second during qualifications, which was their best team finish at a World Championships.

=== 2023 ===
Abdelsalam competed at the African Championships where she helped Egypt take the silver medal behind South Africa. Individually she placed third in the all-around which earned her an individual berth to the 2023 World Championships. At the World Championships Abdelsalam finished 112th during qualifications.

== Competitive history ==
Year	Event	Team	AA	VT	UB	BB	FX
Junior
2019	Mediterranean Championships	4	7	5	2nd place, silver medalist(s)		
2019	Voronin Cup		6		4		
Senior
2022	Cairo World Cup				6		
2022	Mediterranean Games	6	14				
2022	African Championships	1st place, gold medalist(s)	3rd place, bronze medalist(s)		6		
2022	World Championships	22	60				
2023	Doha World Cup					4	
2023	Cairo World Cup					8	
2023	African Championships	2nd place, silver medalist(s)	3rd place, bronze medalist(s)				
2023	Pharaoh's Cup				4	1st place, gold medalist(s)	
2023	World Championships		112				
2024	Antalya Challenge Cup					6	
2026
2026	African Championships	3rd place, bronze medalist(s)			7	3rd place, bronze medalist(s)	
2026	World Championships		91				
