= Fatima Mokhtari =

Algerian artistic gymnast

- Full name: Fatima Ahlem Mokhtari
- Born: 14 June 1999 (age 27) El Bayadh, Algeria

Gymnastics career
- Country represented: Algeria
Medal record
African Games
Silver medal – second place	2019 Rabat	Team
Bronze medal – third place	2015 Brazzaville	Team

Fatima Ahlem Mokhtari (born 14 June 1999) is an Algerian artistic gymnast. She represented Algeria at the 2014 Summer Youth Olympics and helped Algeria win team medals at the 2015 and 2019 African Games.

== Gymnastics career ==
=== Junior ===
Mokhtari placed 12th in the all-around at the 2014 African Junior Championships held in Pretoria, South Africa, and helped Algeria win the team bronze medal. She then represented Algeria at the 2014 Summer Youth Olympics in Nanjing, China. She finished 40th in the all-around during the qualification round and did not advance into any finals. At the 2014 Mediterranean Junior Championships, she finished 14th in the all-around.

=== Senior ===
Mokhtari became age-eligible for senior international competitions in 2015. She represented Algeria at the 2015 African Games and contributed on the vault and balance beam toward the team's bronze medal win. She qualified for the balance beam final and finished sixth. She only competed on the balance beam at the 2016 African Championships and helped Algeria win the team bronze medal.

Mokhtari returned to all-around competition at the 2018 African Championships and helped Algeria win the team bronze medal. She did not place in the all-around competition due to the two-per-country rule. She did qualify for the balance beam final and finished seventh. She represented Algeria at the 2019 African Games and contributed on the vault and uneven bars to help the team win the silver medal behind Egypt. Individually, she finished fifth in the vault final.

Mokhtari competed at the 2021 African Championships in Cairo, and she placed fourth in the all-around competition and missed out on an Olympic berth.
