= Naveen Daries =

South African artistic gymnast

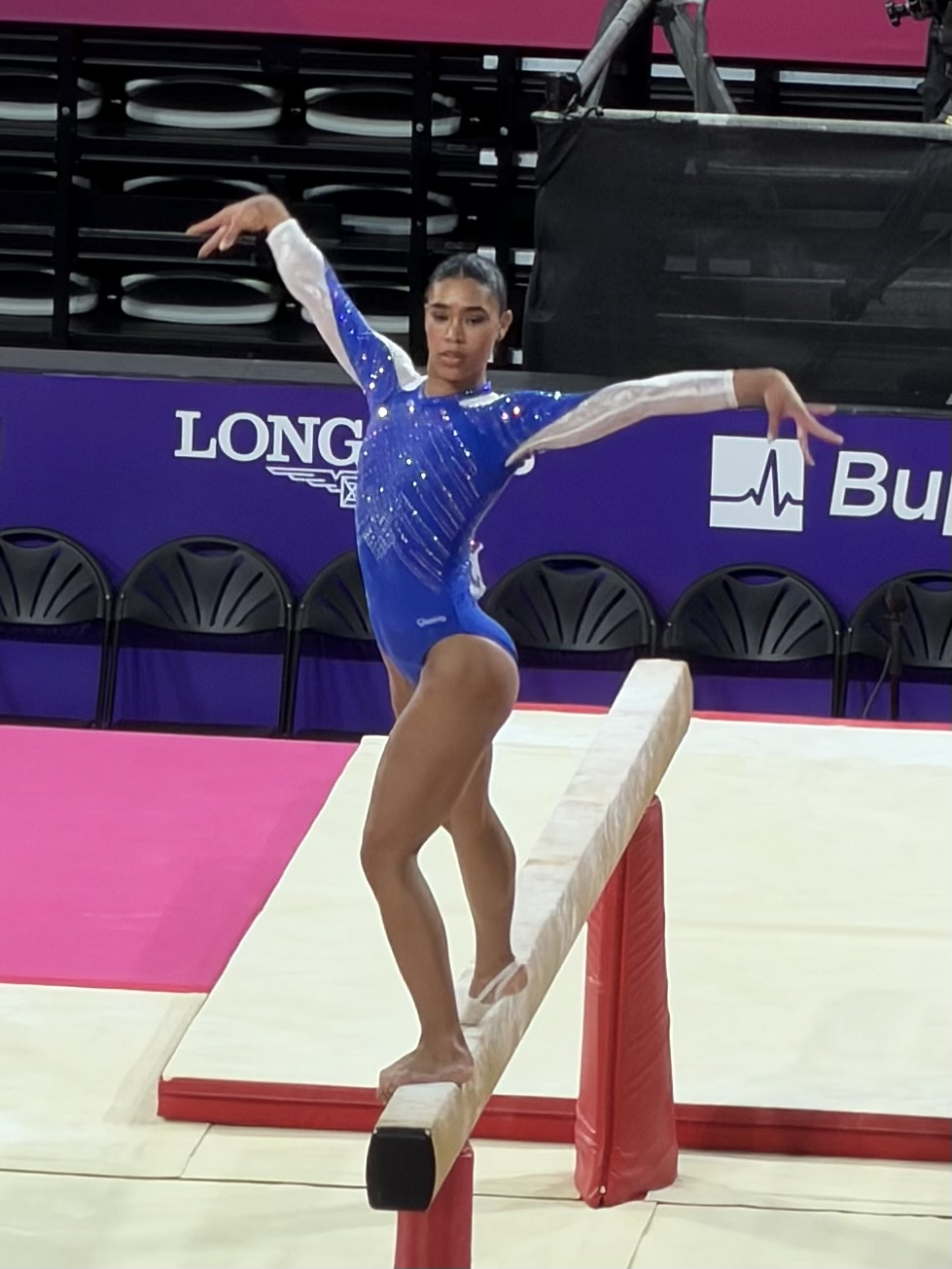
- Daries at the 2026 Commonwealth Games

Personal information
- Full name: Naveen Natascha Daries
- Born: 29 October 2001 (age 24) Pretoria, South Africa
- Height: 1.62 m (5 ft 4 in)

Gymnastics career
- Discipline: Women's artistic gymnastics
- Country represented: South Africa
- Club: Johannesburg Gymnastics Centre
- Head coach: Ilse Roets-Pelser
Medal record
Artistic gymnastics
Representing South Africa
African Championships
| Gold medal – first place | 2023 Pretoria | Team |
| Silver medal – second place | 2022 Cairo | Team |
| Silver medal – second place | 2024 Marrakesh | Team |
| Silver medal – second place | 2024 Marrakesh | Balance beam |
| Silver medal – second place | 2026 Yaoundé | Team |
| Bronze medal – third place | 2021 Cairo | All-around |
| Bronze medal – third place | 2022 Cairo | Uneven bars |
| Bronze medal – third place | 2022 Cairo | Vault |

Naveen Natascha Daries OLY (born 29 October 2001) is a South African artistic gymnast who represented her country at the 2017, 2018 and 2019 World Championships, as well as the 2018 Commonwealth Games. She took the bronze medal in the all-around at the 2021 African Championships, earning a continental berth to the 2020 Summer Olympics in Tokyo.

== Early life ==
Daries took up gymnastics while in kindergarten after seeing a gymnastics competition on television. Her younger sister Zelmé is also an elite gymnast. Daries was born blind in one eye.

== Career ==
=== Junior ===
In June 2015, Daries became the junior South African all-around champion, taking the gold on vault and the bronze on bars, beam and floor exercise. Later that year, Daries competed at the Top Gym Tournament in Belgium, placing 14th all-around.

In 2016, Daries competed at the Austrian Team Open, placing 20th all-around and seventh with the South African team. She went on to take the silver medal behind Caitlin Rooskrantz in the junior all-around competition at the South African Championships, scoring 51.100. She also became the junior national champion on the balance beam with a score of 13.150. In October, Daries competed at the Junior Commonwealth Championships in Namibia, placing fourth in the all-around final with a score of 51.300. She also helped South Africa finish second in the team final behind Wales.

=== Senior ===
Daries turned senior in 2017, making her senior debut at the Koper World Cup in Slovenia but failing to make any finals. She qualified to the vault and floor exercise finals at the Szombathely World Cup, placing seventh in both finals. In September, Daries became the senior South African all-around champion, scoring 51.900, also winning gold on vault and floor exercise. Daries made her world championship debut at the 2017 World Championships in Montreal, placing 39th all-around in qualifications with a score of 47.799.

In 2018, Daries competed at the Baku World Cup, placing seventh on vault and fourth on the uneven bars in the finals. Daries was selected to represent South Africa in Australia at the 2018 Commonwealth Games. She qualified to the all-around final but had to withdraw due to injury. She came back the following month to place second in the all-around at the South African Championships and win gold on floor. Daries also competed at the 2018 World Championships in Qatar, finishing 90th all-around.

In 2019, Daries again became the South African all-around champion, taking the gold on beam and floor and the silver on vault and uneven bars. She qualified to the floor final at the Szombathely World Cup, placing fourth. Daries placed 70th all-around at the 2019 World Championships with a score of 49.399, missing out on qualifying to the Olympic Games through the World Championships by less than a tenth due to the one-per-country rule. Her compatriot Caitlin Rooskrantz qualified to the Games, scoring 49.466.

In 2020, Daries was set to compete at the Baku World Cup; however, the event finals were cancelled due to the COVID-19 pandemic.

In May 2021, Daries competed at the 2021 African Championships in Cairo, Egypt. Despite having a difficult meet with multiple falls, which resulted in the lowest all-around score of her career, Daries managed to place third in the all-around, earning one of the two available continental berths to the 2020 Summer Olympics alongside Egypt's Zeina Ibrahim. This marks the first time South Africa will be represented with two athletes in women's gymnastics at the Olympic Games.

At the Tokyo Olympics, Daries placed 76th in the individual all-around and did not advance to the final.

== Competitive history ==
Competitive history of Naveen Daries
| Year | Event | Team | AA | VT | UB | BB | FX |
|---|---|---|---|---|---|---|---|
| 2015 | JuniorSouth African Championships | | 1st place, gold medalist(s) | 1st place, gold medalist(s) | 3rd place, bronze medalist(s) | 3rd place, bronze medalist(s) | 3rd place, bronze medalist(s) |
| 2015 | Top Gym Tournament | | 14 | 11 | 12 | 14 | 9 |
| 2016 | Austrian Team Open | 7 | 20 | | | | |
| 2016 | Junior South African Championships | | 2nd place, silver medalist(s) | 2nd place, silver medalist(s) | 2nd place, silver medalist(s) | 1st place, gold medalist(s) | 3rd place, bronze medalist(s) |
| 2016 | Junior Commonwealth Championships | 2nd place, silver medalist(s) | 4 | 4 | | 4 | 7 |
| 2017 | Szombathely World Cup | | | 7 | | | 7 |
| 2017 | South African Championships | | 1st place, gold medalist(s) | 1st place, gold medalist(s) | 2nd place, silver medalist(s) | 2nd place, silver medalist(s) | 1st place, gold medalist(s) |
| 2017 | World Championships | | 39 | | | | |
| 2018 | Baku World Cup | | | 7 | 4 | | |
| 2018 | Commonwealth Games | | 18 | | | | |
| 2018 | South African Championships | | 2nd place, silver medalist(s) | | 2nd place, silver medalist(s) | 3rd place, bronze medalist(s) | 1st place, gold medalist(s) |
| 2018 | World Championships | | 90 | | | | |
| 2019 | South African Championships | | 1st place, gold medalist(s) | 2nd place, silver medalist(s) | 2nd place, silver medalist(s) | 1st place, gold medalist(s) | 1st place, gold medalist(s) |
| 2019 | Szombathely World Cup | | | | | | 4 |
| 2019 | World Championships | | 70 | | | | |
| 2021 | South African National Trials | | 2nd place, silver medalist(s) | 2nd place, silver medalist(s) | | 3rd place, bronze medalist(s) | 3rd place, bronze medalist(s) |
| 2021 | African Championships | | 3rd place, bronze medalist(s) | | | | |
| 2021 | Cairo World Cup | | | 6 | 7 | 4 | 5 |
| 2021 | Olympic Games | | 76 | | | | |
2022
| 2022 | African Championships | 2nd place, silver medalist(s) | 4 | 3rd place, bronze medalist(s) | 3rd place, bronze medalist(s) | | |
| 2022 | Commonwealth Games | 4 | 6 | 7 | | | |
| 2022 | World Championships | | 52 | | | | |
2023
| 2023 | African Championships | 1st place, gold medalist(s) | 4 | | | | |
| 2023 | World Championships | 19 | 79 | | | | |
2024
| 2024 | African Championships | 2nd place, silver medalist(s) | 4 | | | 2nd place, silver medalist(s) | |
| 2025 | Tashkent World Challenge Cup | | | | 2nd place, silver medalist(s) | | |
2026
| 2026 | African Championships | 2nd place, silver medalist(s) | 4 | | 4 | | |
| 2026 | Koper World Challenge Cup | | | | 6 | | |
| 2026 | Commonwealth Games | 5 | 10 | | | R2 | |
| 2026 | World Championships | | 81 | | | | |
