= Egypt women's national artistic gymnastics team =

National sports team

Egypt
- Continental union: African Gymnastics Union

Olympic Games
- Appearances: 0

World Championships
- Appearances: 4

African Games
- Medals: Gold: 2019; Silver: 2015

The Egypt women's national artistic gymnastics team represents Egypt in FIG international competitions.

== History ==
Egypt has never fielded a team at the Olympic Games. Sherine El-Zeiny became the first female Egyptian artistic gymnast to compete at the Olympic Games, doing so in 2008. Since then Egypt has had at least one female gymnast compete at each Olympic Games.

== Team competition results ==
=== World Championships ===
| Year | Position | Squad |
|---|---|---|
| 2014 | 36th place | Rana El-Bialy, Miriam Fouad, Rowan Hazem, Fadwa Mahmoud, Nancy Taman, Malak Zaghiloul |
| 2018 | 25th place | Farah Hussein, Mandy Mohamed, Farah Salem, Nancy Taman |
| 2019 | 24th place | Farah Hussein, Zeina Ibrahim, Mandy Mohamed, Farah Salem, Nancy Taman |
| 2022 | 22nd place | Jana Abdelsalam, Jana Aboelhasan, Zeina Ibrahim, Nancy Taman |

=== Junior World Championships ===
| Year | Position | Squad |
|---|---|---|
| 2019 | 24th place | Jana Aboelhasan, Jana Mahmoud, Salma Melige |
| 2023 | 16th place | Judy Abdalla, Sirine Abouelhoda, Shams Ali |
| 2025 | 23rd place | Malikah Ahmed, Khadiga Mazhar, Lara Soliman |

== Senior roster ==
| Name | Birth date and age | Hometown |
|---|---|---|
| Jana Aboelhasan | 29 September 2005 (age 21) | Cairo |
| Farida Dabour | 29 January 2005 (age 21) | Alexandria |
| Sandra Elsadek | 18 June 2000 (age 26) | Sarasota, Florida |
| Farah Hussein | 7 October 2001 (age 25) | Alexandria |
| Zeina Ibrahim | 20 June 2003 (age 23) | Alexandria |
| Hana Kassem | 24 June 2000 (age 26) | Giza |
| Jana Mahmoud | 17 August 2004 (age 22) | Giza |
| Salma Melige | 3 January 2004 (age 22) | Cairo |
| Mandy Mohamed | 23 February 2000 (age 26) | Haarlem |
| Mariam Omar | 28 November 2005 (age 20) | Alexandria |
| Farah Salem | 1 March 2001 (age 25) | Cairo |
| Nancy Taman | 15 November 1994 (age 32) | Alexandria |

== See also ==
- List of Olympic female artistic gymnasts for Egypt
