= 2022 African Artistic Gymnastics Championships =

Artistic Gymnastics Championship

African Artistic Gymnastics Championships
- Venue: Cairo International Stadium
- Location: Cairo, Egypt
- Date: July 8–11, 2022
- Competitors: 79 from 7 nations

The 2022 African Artistic Gymnastics Championships was the 16th iteration of the event and took place on July 8–11 in Cairo, Egypt. Both senior and junior titles were contested.

The competition served as qualification for the 2022 World Championships.

== Medal winners ==
=== Senior ===
Event	Gold	Silver	Bronze
Men
Team	(Egypt) Egypt; Abdelrahman Abdelhaleem; Ahmed Abdelrahman; Mohamed Afify; Zaid Khater; Omar Mohamed	(Algeria) Algeria; Bilal Bellaoui; Mohamed Bourguieg; Djaber Hmida; Hillal Metidji; Mohamed Yousfi	(South Africa) South Africa; Luke James; Ruan Lange; Muhammad- Khaalid Mia
All-around	(Egypt) Mohamed Afify	(Egypt) Omar Mohamed	(Algeria) Hillal Metidji
Floor Exercise	(Egypt) Omar Mohamed	(South Africa) Luke James	(South Africa) Muhammad-Khaalid Mia
Pommel Horse	(Morocco) Abderrazak Nasser	(Egypt) Abdelrahman Abdelhaleem	(Morocco) Zakariae Setti
Rings	(Egypt) Omar Mohamed	(Egypt) Mohamed Afify	(Algeria) Hillal Metidji
Vault	(Egypt) Omar Mohamed	(Morocco) Achraf Quistas	(Morocco) Abderrazak Nasser
Parallel Bars	(Egypt) Omar Mohamed	(Algeria) Hillal Metidji	(Egypt) Mohamed Afify
Horizontal Bar	(Egypt) Mohamed Afify	(Algeria) Hillal Metidji	(Algeria) Djaber Hmida
Women
Team	(Egypt) Egypt; Jana Abdelsalam; Jana Aboelhasan; Zeina Ibrahim; Jana Mahmoud; Nancy Taman	(South Africa) South Africa; Naveen Daries; Shante Koti; Garcelle Napier; Mammule Rankoe; Caitlin Rooskrantz	(Algeria) Algeria; Fatma Boukhatem; Sihem Hamidi; Sofia Nair; Lahna Salem; Chama Temmami
All-around	(South Africa) Caitlin Rooskrantz	(Egypt) Jana Aboelhasan	(Egypt) Jana Abdelsalam
Vault	(Egypt) Jana Mahmoud	(Egypt) Nancy Taman	(South Africa) Naveen Daries
Uneven Bars	(South Africa) Caitlin Rooskrantz	(Egypt) Zeina Ibrahim	(South Africa) Naveen Daries
Balance Beam	(Egypt) Zeina Ibrahim	(Egypt) Jana Aboelhasan	(South Africa) Caitlin Rooskrantz
Floor Exercise	(Egypt) Jana Mahmoud	(Egypt) Jana Aboelhasan	(South Africa) Garcelle Napier

=== Junior ===
Event	Gold	Silver	Bronze
Men
Team	(Egypt) Egypt; Abdullah Abdelhalim; Mostafa Ahmed; Mohamed Attia; Aser Elkeky; Yahia Zakaria	(Algeria) Algeria; Lokmane Aissa; Riadh Aliouat; Othmane Bayou; Mohamed Seghier; Youcef Semmani	(South Africa) South Africa; Kadin Chester; Keegan Klopper; Daniel McLean; Burhaan Mia; Sibusiso Zulu
All-around	(Egypt) Mosatafa Ahmed	(Algeria) Riadh Aliouat	(Egypt) Mohamed Hussam
Floor Exercise	(Algeria) Lokmane Aissa	(Algeria) Ridah Aliouat	(Egypt) Aser Elkeky
Pommel Horse	(Egypt) Mostafa Ahmed	(Egypt) Abdullah Abdelhaleem	(Algeria) Mohamed Seghier
Rings	(Egypt) Mostafa Ahmed	(Egypt) Mohamed Attia	(Algeria) Youcef Semmani
Vault	(Egypt) Yahia Mohamed	(Egypt) Aser Elkeky	(Algeria) Mohamed Seghier
Parallel Bars	(Egypt) Mostafa Ahmed	(Egypt) Mohamed Hossam	(Morocco) Taha Kabouri
Horizontal Bar	(Egypt) Yahia Mohamed	(Algeria) Ridah Aliouat	(South Africa) Burhaan Mia
Women
Team	(Egypt) Egypt; Judy Abdullah; Sirine Abouelhoda; Lena El Ngar; Hla El Shaer; Habiba Shafie	(South Africa) South Africa; Caleigh Anders; Sarah Armstrong; Farrah Brett; Tatum Daniels; Karma Visagie	(Morocco) Morocco; Chorouk Elannabi; Ines Laabourri; Rihab Sobti
All-around	(Egypt) Judy Abdullah	(South Africa) Carleigh Anders	(South Africa) Karma Visagie
Vault	(Egypt) Judy Abdullah	(South Africa) Farrah Brett	(South Africa) Karma Visagie
Uneven Bars	(Egypt) Judy Abdullah	(South Africa) Karma Visagie	(South Africa) Carleigh Anders
Balance Beam	(South Africa) Carleigh Anders	(Egypt) Judy Abdullah	(Egypt) Hla Elshaer
Floor Exercise	(Egypt) Sirine Abouelhoda	(Egypt) Judy Abdullah	(South Africa) Carleigh Anders

== Medal table ==
=== Combined ===
Rank	Nation	Gold	Silver	Bronze	Total
1	Egypt (EGY)	23	14	5	42
2	South Africa (RSA)	3	6	12	21
3	Algeria (ALG)	1	7	7	15
4	Morocco (MAR)	1	1	4	6
Totals (4 entries)		28	28	28	84

=== Men ===
Rank	Nation	Gold	Silver	Bronze	Total
1	Egypt (EGY)	14	7	3	24
2	Algeria (ALG)	1	7	6	14
3	Morocco (MAR)	1	1	3	5
4	South Africa (RSA)	0	1	4	5
Totals (4 entries)		16	16	16	48

=== Women ===
Rank	Nation	Gold	Silver	Bronze	Total
1	Egypt (EGY)	9	7	2	18
2	South Africa (RSA)	3	5	8	16
3	Algeria (ALG)	0	0	1	1
3	Morocco (MAR)	0	0	1	1
Totals (4 entries)		12	12	12	36

== World Championship berths ==
The event served as qualification for the 2022 World Championships. Egypt earned a team berth for both men's and women's artistic gymnastics. The top two men not part of a team earned an individual berth (max 2 per country): Hillal Metidji of Algeria and Abderrazak Nasser of Morocco. The top four women not part of a team earned an individual berth (max 2 per country): Caitlin Rooskrantz and Naveen Daries of South Africa and Fatima Zohra Boukhatem and Lahna Salem of Algeria.

== Participating nations ==
- Algeria (15)
- Cameroon (4)
- Egypt (20)
- Morocco (17)
- South Africa (18)
- Senegal (4)
- Zimbabwe (1)
