= Salma Mahmoud El Said Mohamed =

Egyptian artistic gymnast

Salma Mahmoud
- Full name: Salma Mahmoud El Said Mohamed
- Born: 1 October 1991 (age 34)

Gymnastics career
- Discipline: Women's artistic gymnastics
- Country represented: Egypt; (2012)

Salma Mahmoud El Said Mohamed (born 1 October 1991) is an Egyptian female artistic gymnast and part of the national team.

She participated at the 2012 Summer Olympics in London, United Kingdom, and the 2009 and 2011 World Artistic Gymnastics Championships.
