= Jana Mahmoud =

Egyptian artistic gymnast (born 2004)

Jana Mahmoud جنى محمود
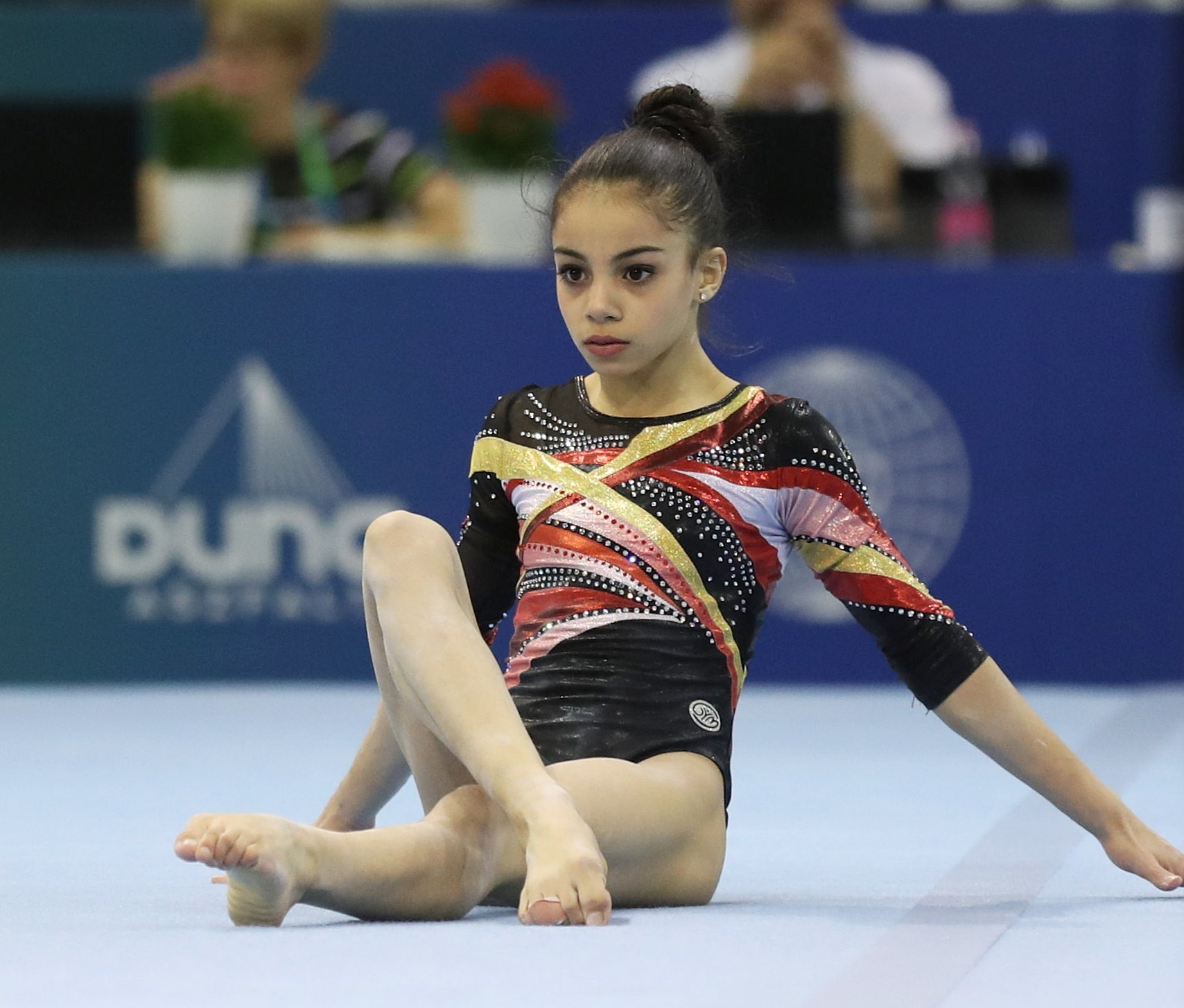
- Mahmoud at the 2019 Junior World Championships

Personal information
- Full name: Jana Hani Ismail Mahmoud
- Born: 17 August 2004 (age 22) Giza, Egypt

Gymnastics career
- Discipline: Women's artistic gymnastics
- Country represented: Egypt; (2018–present)
- Club: Egyptian Shooting Club
- Head coaches: Mahmoud Sayed, Salma Al-Saeed
Medal record
Representing Egypt
African Championships
Gold medal – first place	2022 Cairo	Team
Gold medal – first place	2022 Cairo	Vault
Gold medal – first place	2022 Cairo	Floor exercise
Gold medal – first place	2024 Marrakesh	Team
Gold medal – first place	2024 Marrakesh	All-around
Gold medal – first place	2024 Marrakesh	Floor exercise
Silver medal – second place	2023 Pretoria	Team
Bronze medal – third place	2026 Yaoundé	Team

Jana Hani Ismail Mahmoud (Arabic: جنى محمود; born 17 August 2004) is an Egyptian artistic gymnast. She won the all-around title at the 2024 African Championships and qualified for the 2024 Olympic Games. She is a two-time African champion on the floor exercise (2022, 2024) and is the 2022 African vault champion. She helped the Egyptian team win the team titles at the 2022 and 2024 African Championships. She represented Egypt at the 2024 Summer Olympics.

== Early life ==
Mahmoud was born in Giza in 2004. Her older brother Seifaldeen Ismael has represented Egypt internationally in parkour and trampoline gymnastics, including at the 2022 Parkour World Championships.

== Junior gymnastics career ==
Mahmoud finished 11th in the all-around at the 2017 Egyptian Championships.

=== 2018 ===
Mahmoud competed at the Stella Zakharova Cup where she finished eighth in the all-around and won a silver medal on the balance beam and a bronze medal on the floor exercise. She next competed at the 2018 African Championships where she helped Egypt place first as a team in the junior division. Individually, she placed first in the all-around and second on uneven bars and balance beam.

=== 2019 ===
Mahmoud began the season at the Asian Junior Cup and won the gold medals in the all-around, vault, uneven bars, and floor exercise. She was selected to compete at the inaugural Junior World Championships alongside Jana Aboelhasan and Salma Melige. They finished 24th as a team, and Mahmoud finished 51st in the all-around. Then at the Mediterranean Championships, she placed fourth in the all-around and on the balance beam, and she won the gold medal on the floor exercise. She finished the year competing at the Voronin Cup and won a silver medal in the all-around. In the event finals, she won another silver medal on the floor exercise, and she placed fifth on the uneven bars and eighth on the vault and balance beam.

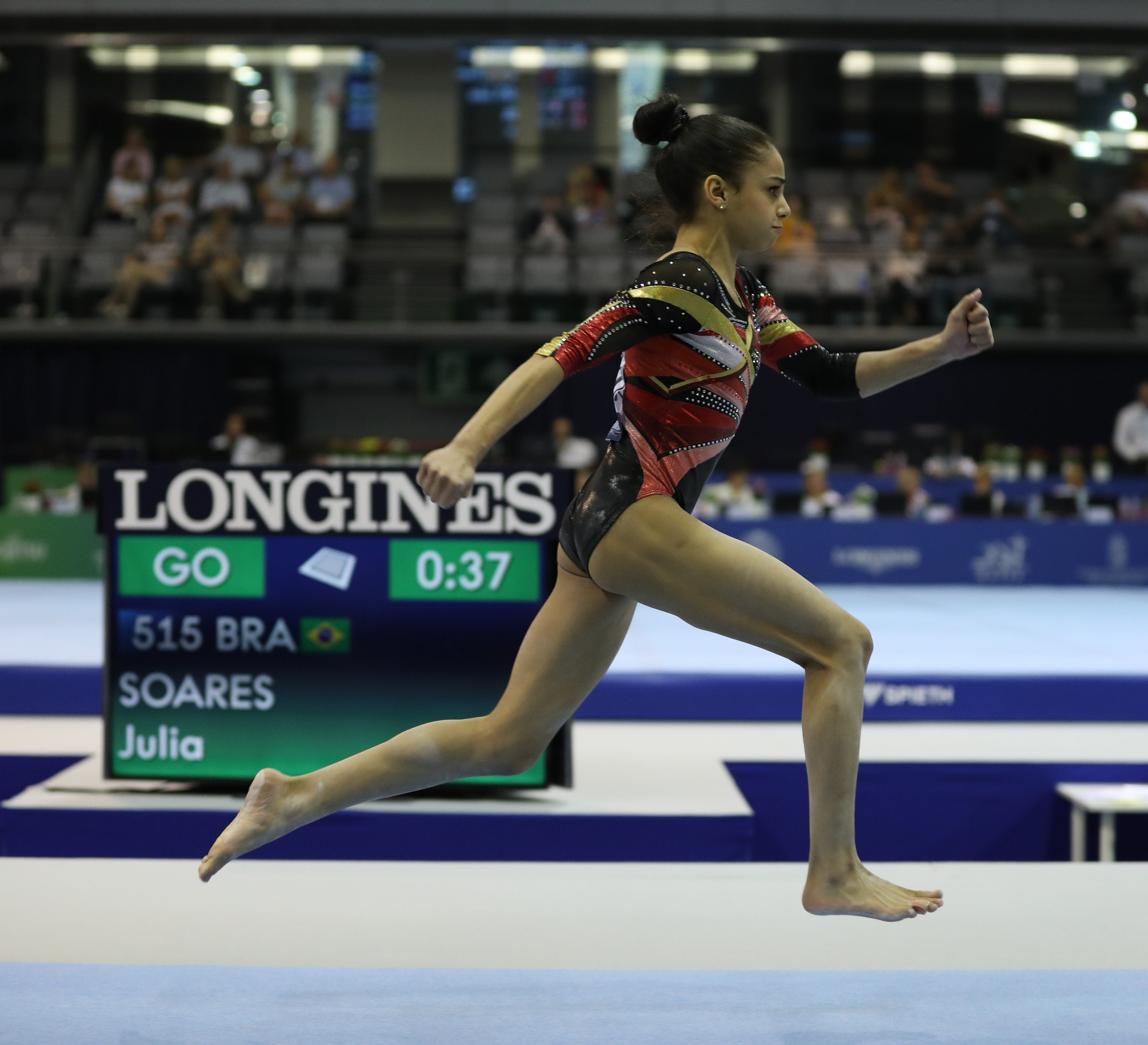
Vault

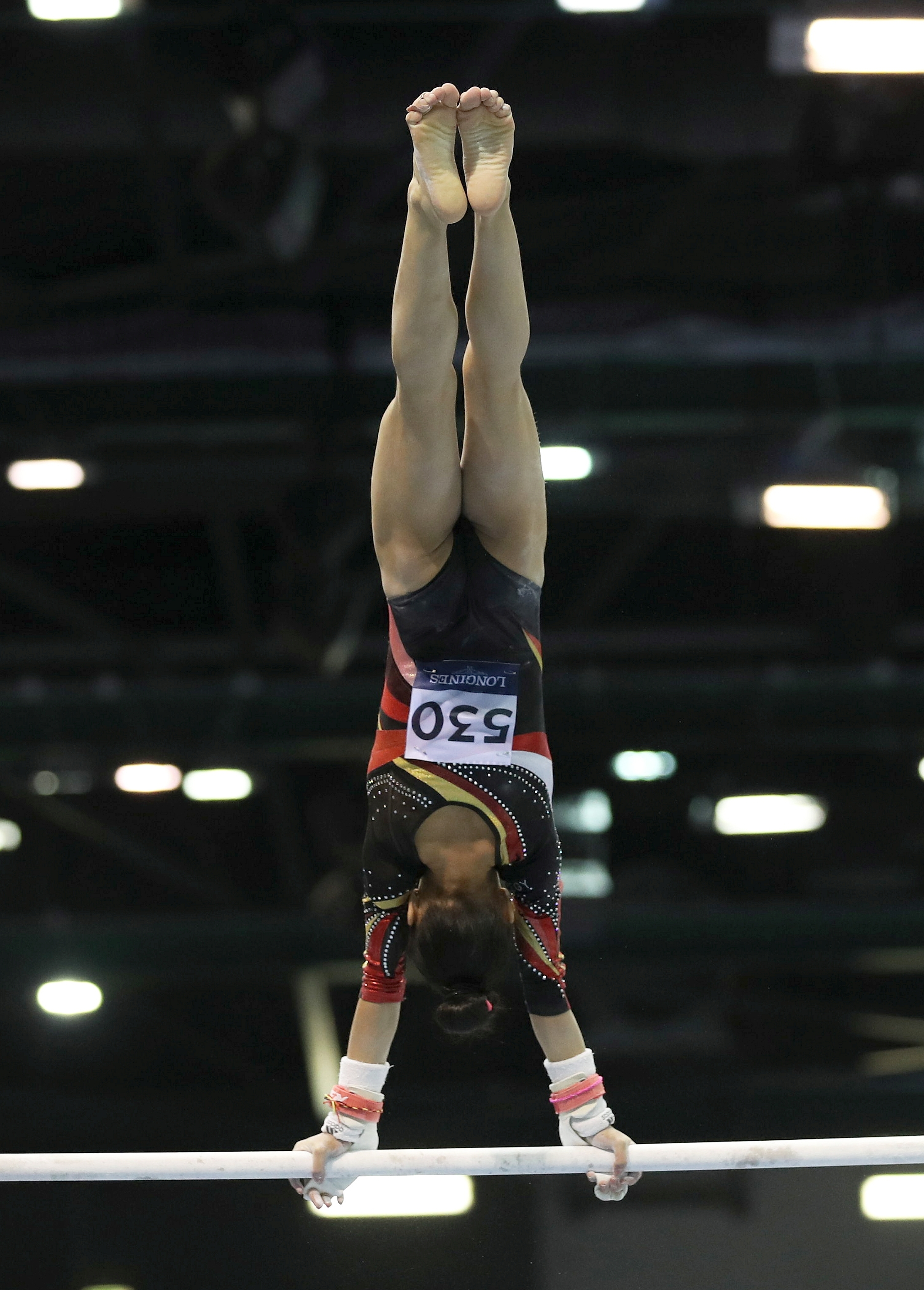
Uneven bars

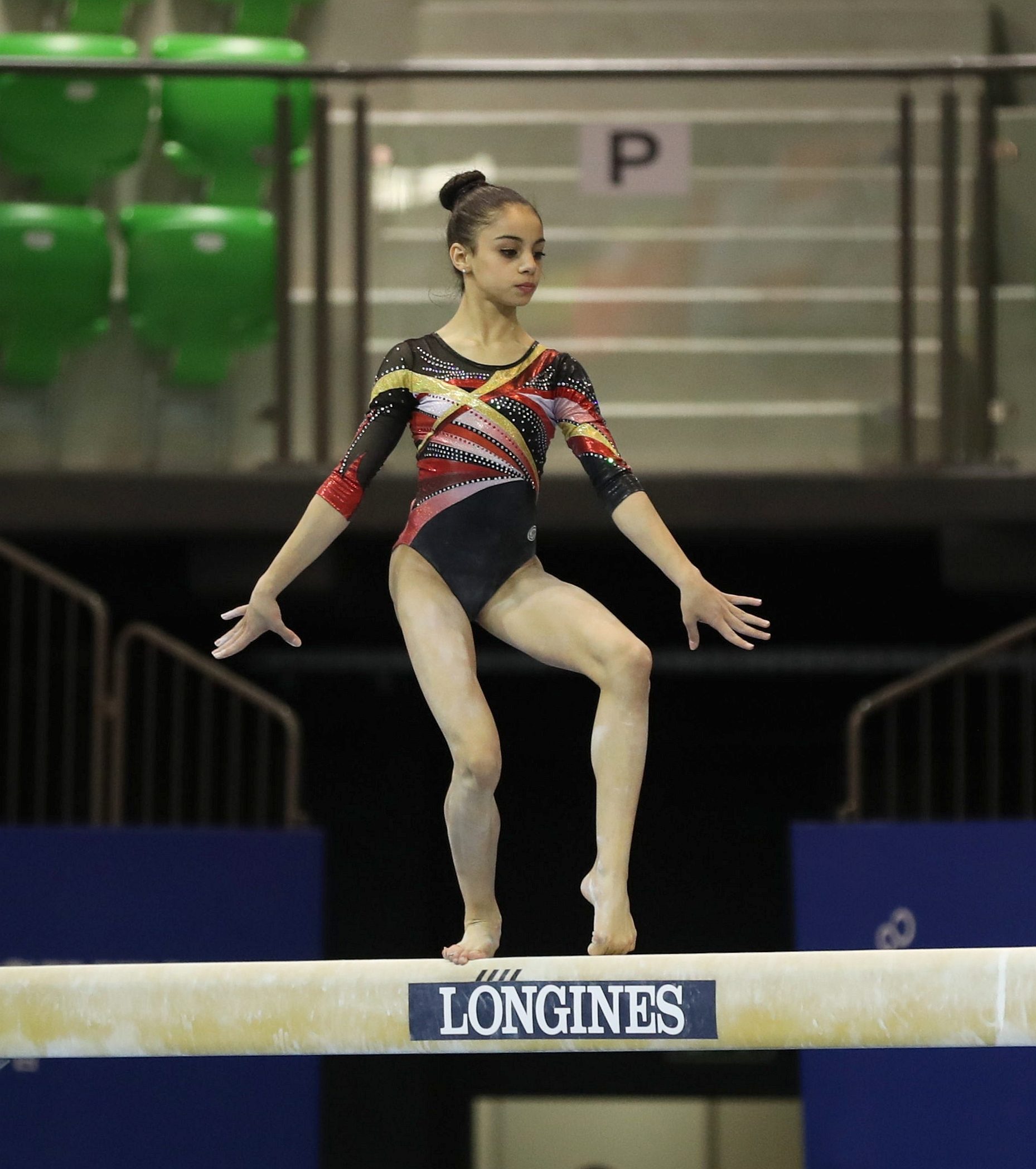
Balance beam

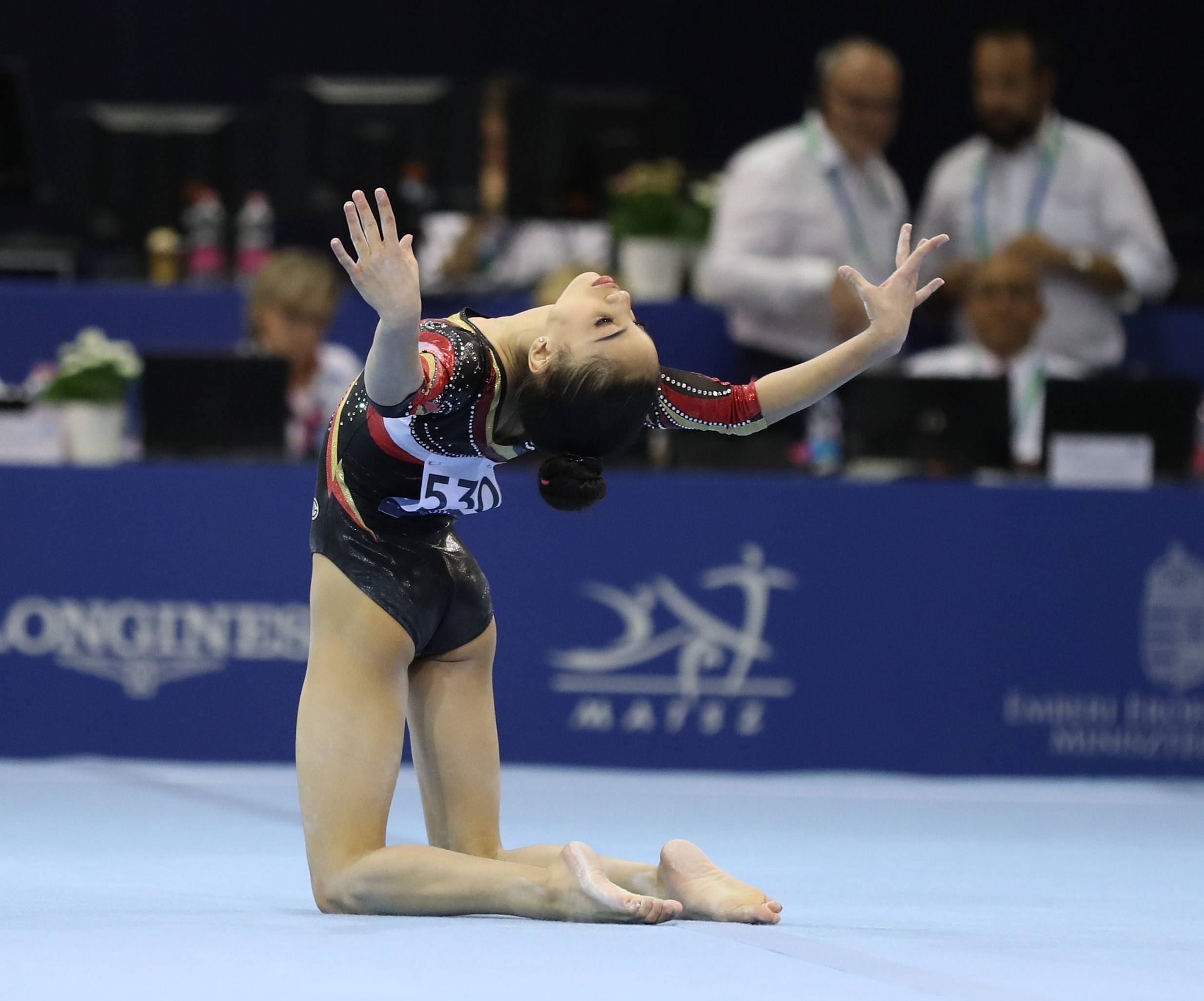
Floor exercise

Mahmoud at the 2019 Junior World Championships

== Senior gymnastics career ==
Mahmoud became age-eligible for senior competitions in 2020 but did not compete until 2021 due to the global COVID-19 pandemic.

=== 2021 ===
Mahmoud made her senior debut at the African Championships where she recorded the third-highest all-around score but did not place due to teammates Zeina Ibrahim and Farah Hussein scoring higher. She next competed at the Doha World Cup where she placed seventh on the uneven bars and sixth on the floor exercise. She could not compete at the World Championships due to an injury.

=== 2022 ===
Mahmoud was selected to compete at the 2022 Mediterranean Games. She helped Egypt place sixth as a team, and individually, she placed sixth in the all-around. She also finished sixth in the vault event final. She next competed at the African Championships where she helped Egypt place first as a team and qualify to the upcoming World Championships. Individually, she placed first on vault and floor exercise. She was injured during the warmups at the World Championships, and the Egyptian team finished 22nd in the qualification round.

=== 2023 ===
Mahmoud began the season at the Doha World Cup and finished eighth on the uneven bars. She competed with the Egyptian team that won a silver medal at the African Championships. She then won a silver medal on the floor exercise at the Pharaoh's Cup. Although Egypt did not qualify as a team for the World Championships, Mahmoud qualified to compete on the uneven bars through her World Cup series results. She scored 11.533 and placed 115th in the qualification round.

=== 2024 ===
Mahmoud finished eighth on the floor exercise at the Cairo World Cup. She then finished fourth on the floor exercise at the Doha World Cup. At the African Championships, she won the all-around title and secured qualification for the 2024 Olympic Games. Additionally, she won gold medals with the Egyptian team and on floor exercise. At the 2024 Olympic Games Mahmoud finished fifty-eighth during qualifications and did not advance to any finals.

== Competitive history ==
Competitive history of Jana Mahmoud
Year	Event	Team	AA	VT	UB	BB	FX
2017	Egyptian Championships		11				
2018	Stella Zakharova Cup	6	8			2nd place, silver medalist(s)	3rd place, bronze medalist(s)
2018	Junior African Championships	1st place, gold medalist(s)	1st place, gold medalist(s)		2nd place, silver medalist(s)	2nd place, silver medalist(s)	4
2019
2019	Junior World Championships	24	51				
2019	Mediterranean Championships	4	4			4	1st place, gold medalist(s)
2019	Voronin Cup		2nd place, silver medalist(s)	8	5	8	2nd place, silver medalist(s)
2021	Doha World Cup				7		6
2022	Mediterranean Games	6	6	6			
2022	African Championships	1st place, gold medalist(s)		1st place, gold medalist(s)			1st place, gold medalist(s)
2022	World Championships	22					
2023	Doha World Cup				8		
2023	African Championships	2nd place, silver medalist(s)					
2023	Pharaoh's Cup						2nd place, silver medalist(s)
2023	World Championships				115		
2024	Cairo World Cup						8
2024	Doha World Cup						4
2024	African Championships	1st place, gold medalist(s)	1st place, gold medalist(s)				1st place, gold medalist(s)
2024	RomGym Trophy					7	4
2024	Olympic Games		58				
2025	Cairo World Cup						1st place, gold medalist(s)
2026
2026	African Championships	3rd place, bronze medalist(s)	6				6
