= Jana Aboelhasan =

Egyptian artistic gymnast (born 2005)

Jana Aboelhasan جنى أبو الحسن
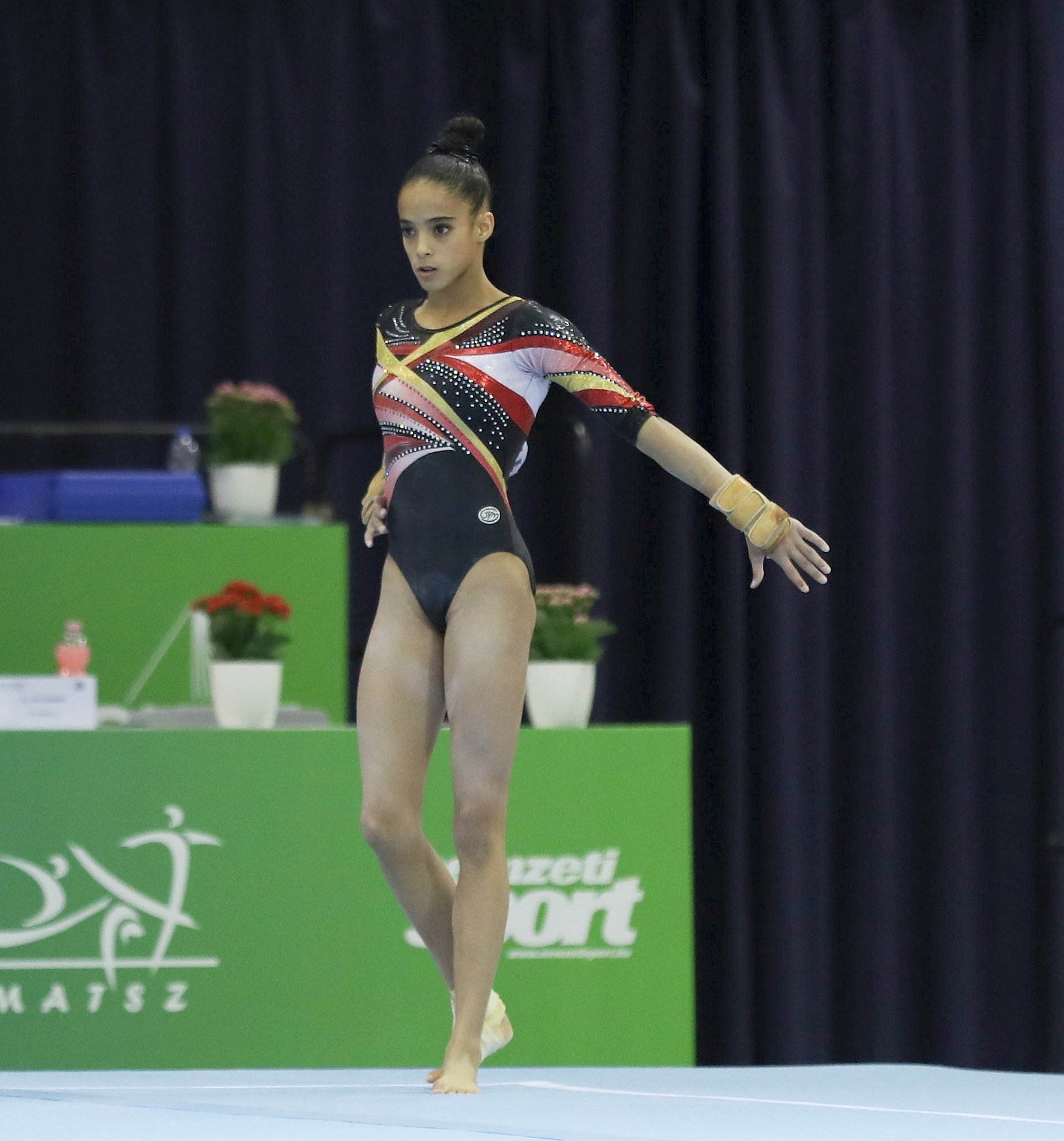
- Aboelhasan at the 2019 Junior World Championships

Personal information
- Full name: Jana Aboelhasan
- Born: 29 September 2005 (age 21) Cairo, Egypt

Gymnastics career
- Discipline: Women's artistic gymnastics
- Country represented: Egypt; (2018–2022)
- Head coach: Salma Mohamed
- Assistant coach: Mahmoud Moussa
Medal record
Representing Egypt
African Championships
Gold medal – first place	2022 Cairo	Team
Silver medal – second place	2022 Cairo	All-Around
Silver medal – second place	2022 Cairo	Balance Beam
Silver medal – second place	2022 Cairo	Floor Exercise

Jana Aboelhasan (Arabic: جنى أبو الحسن, born 29 September 2005) is an Egyptian artistic gymnast. She was a member of the team who won gold at the 2022 African Championships. Additionally she represented Egypt at the inaugural Junior World Championships.

== Personal life ==
Aboelhasan was born in Cairo in 2005.

== Gymnastics career ==
Aboelhasan competed at the 2018 African Championships where she helped Egypt place first as a team in the junior division. Additionally she placed first on floor exercise. In September she competed at the 2018 Junior Mediterranean Championships where Egypt placed fourth as a team and individually she placed sixth in the all-around, eighth on vault, but won silver on balance beam.

In 2019 Aboelhasan was selected to compete at the inaugural Junior World Championships alongside Jana Mahmoud and Salma Melige; they finished 24th as a team.

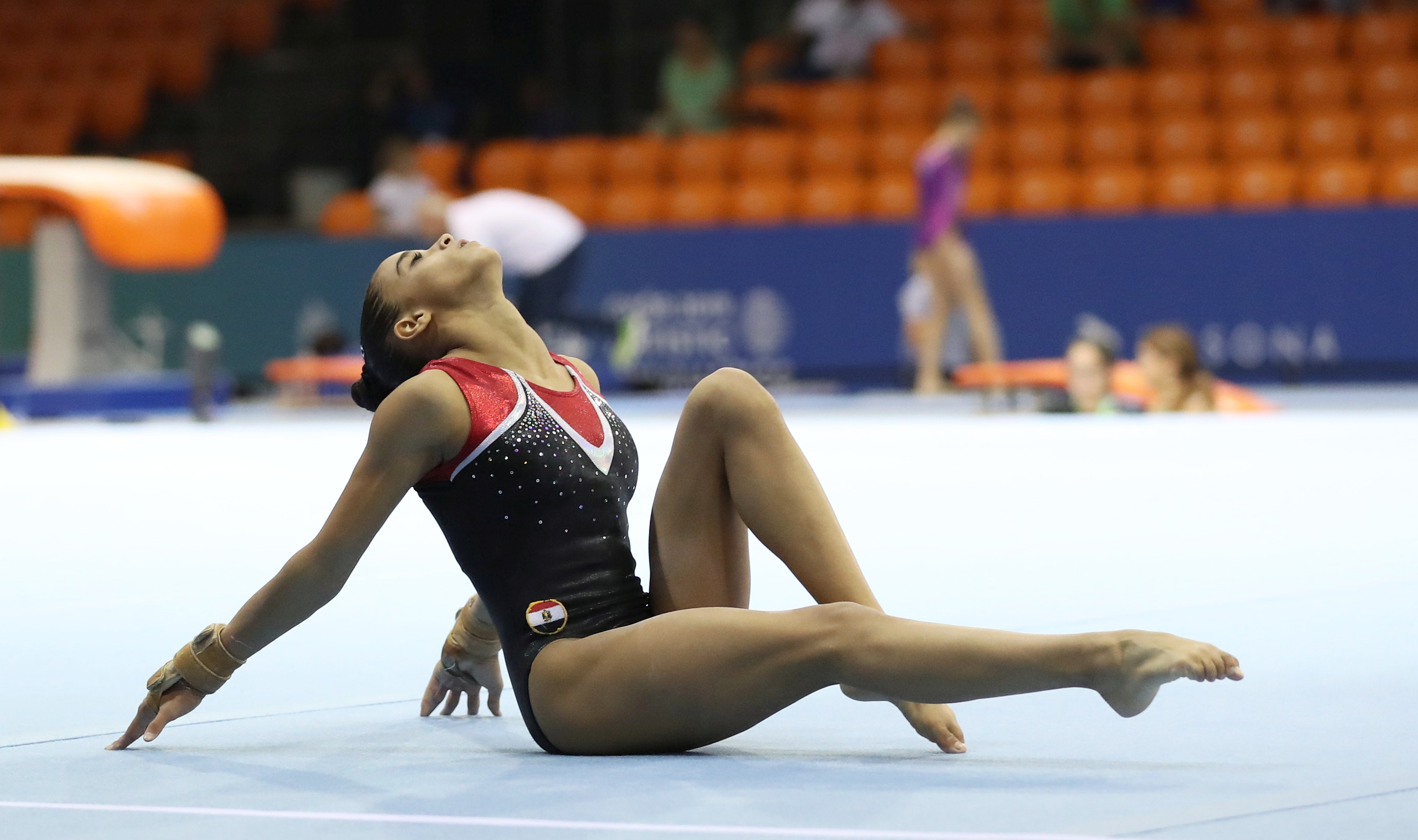
Podium training

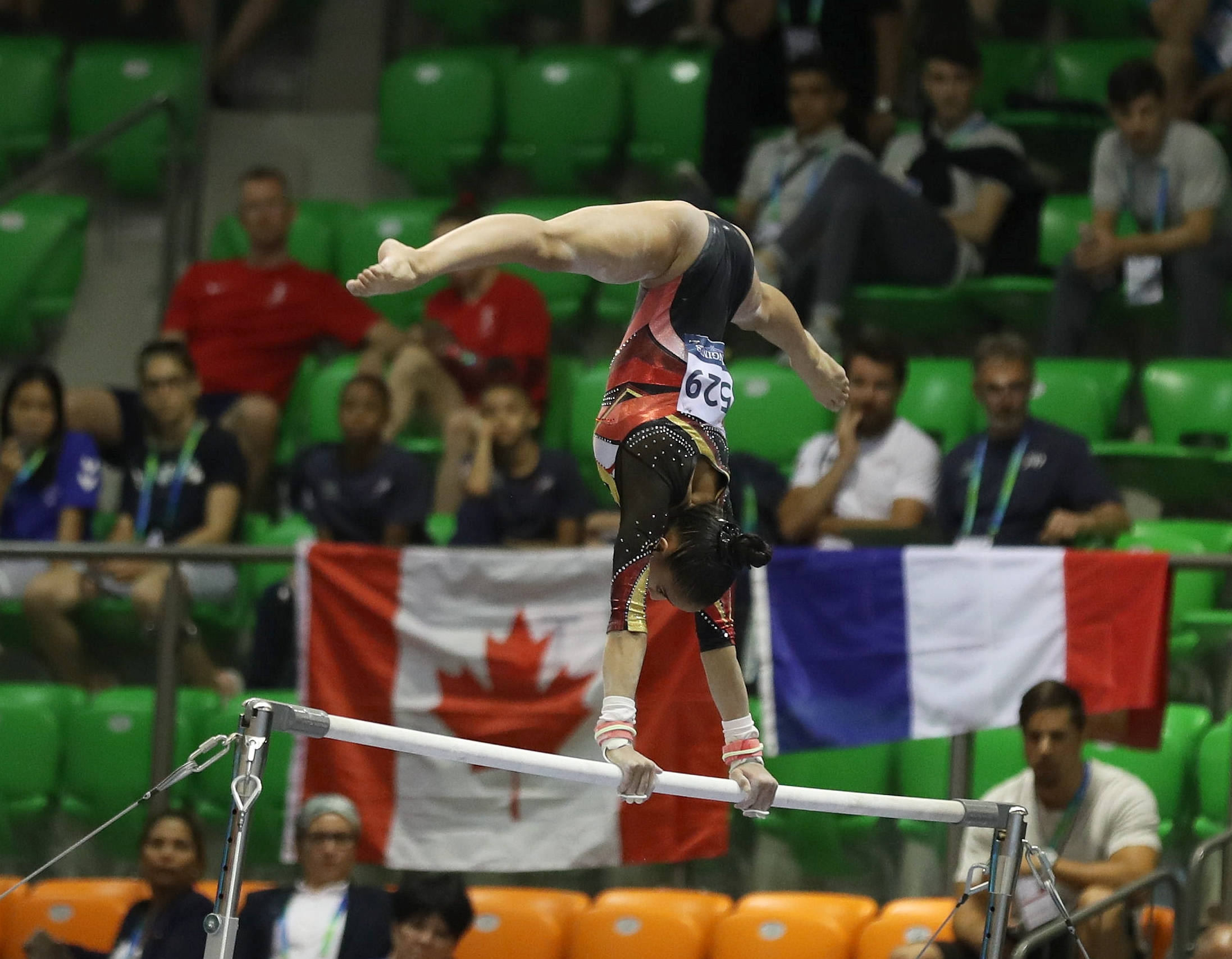
Uneven bars

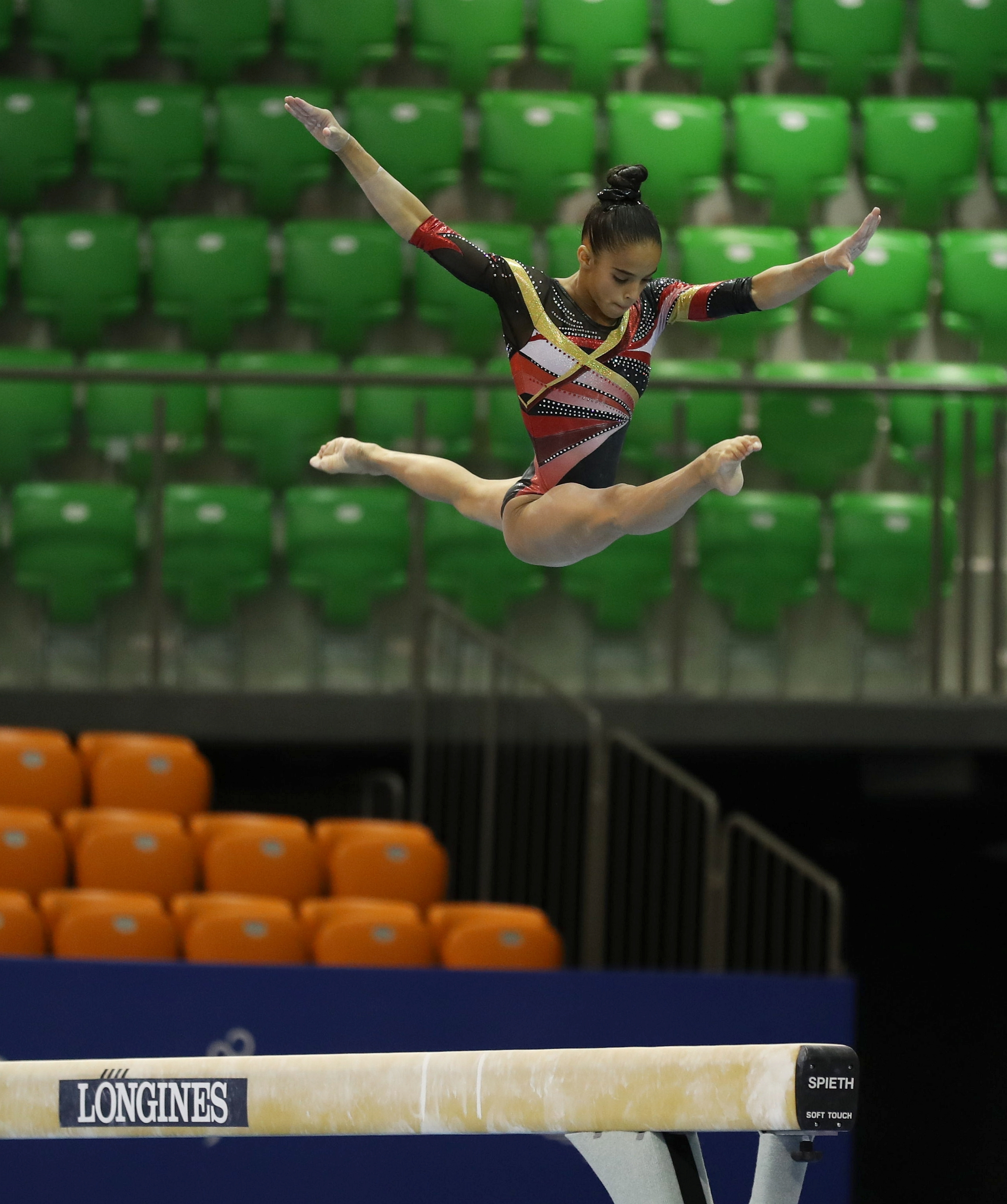
Balance beam

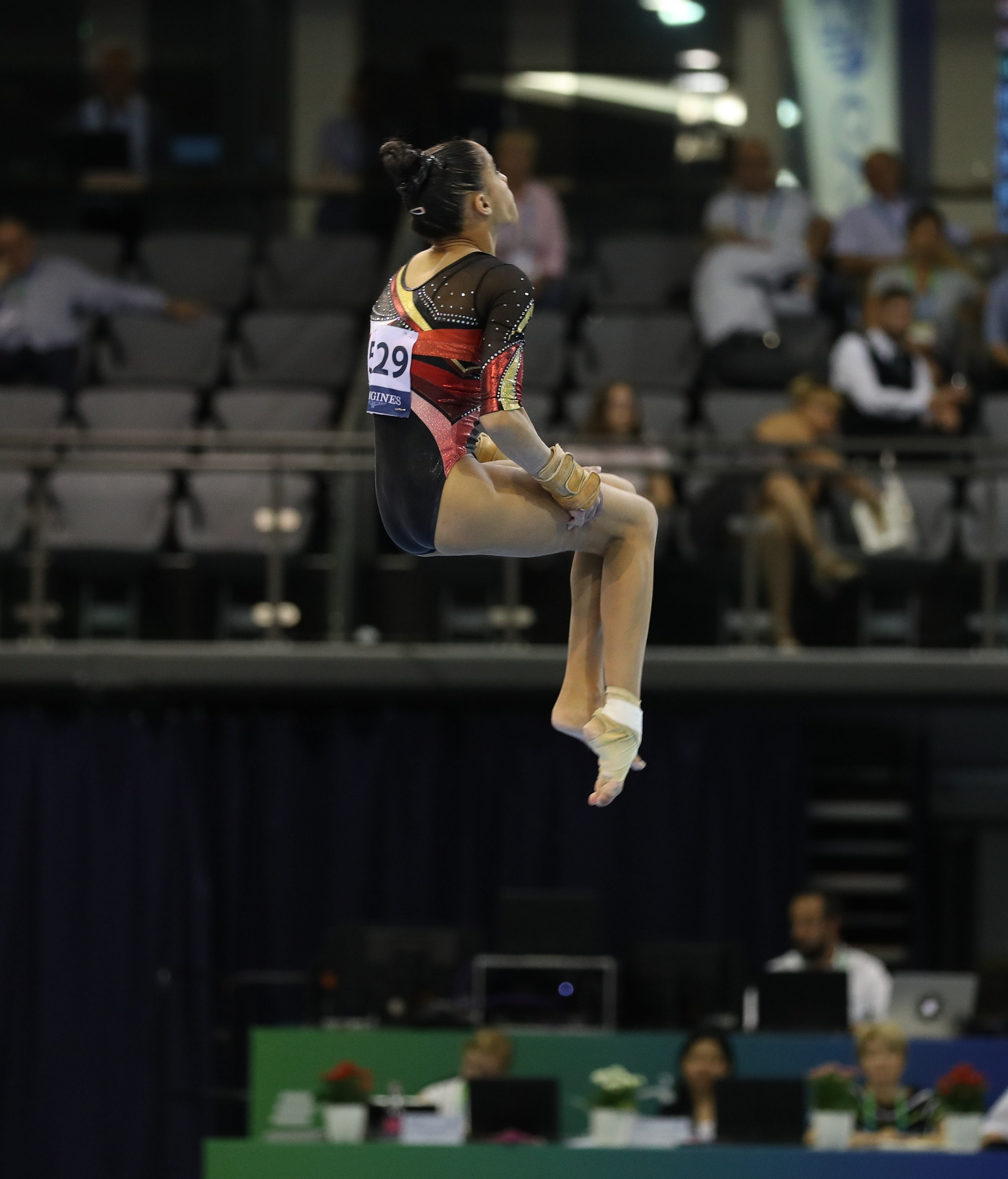
Floor exercise

Aboelhasan at the 2019 Junior World Championships

Aboelhasan made her senior international debut at the 2022 Mediterranean Games. She helped Egypt place sixth as a team. She next competed at the 2022 African Championships where she helped Egypt place first as a team and qualify to the upcoming World Championships. Individually she placed second in the all-around behind Caitlin Rooskrantz of South Africa, as well as second on balance beam and floor exercise behind compatriots Zeina Ibrahim and Jana Mahmoud respectively.

== Competitive history ==
Competitive history of Jana Aboelhasan
Year	Event	Team	AA	VT	UB	BB	FX
2018
2018	Junior African Championships	1st place, gold medalist(s)				4	1st place, gold medalist(s)
2018	Mediterranean Championships	4	6	8		2nd place, silver medalist(s)	
2019
2019	Junior World Championships	24					
2022	Mediterranean Games	6					
2022	African Championships	1st place, gold medalist(s)	2nd place, silver medalist(s)			2nd place, silver medalist(s)	2nd place, silver medalist(s)
2022	World Championships	22					
