= Zeina Ibrahim =

Egyptian artistic gymnast (born 2003)

Zeina Ibrahim زينة ابراهيم•شرف
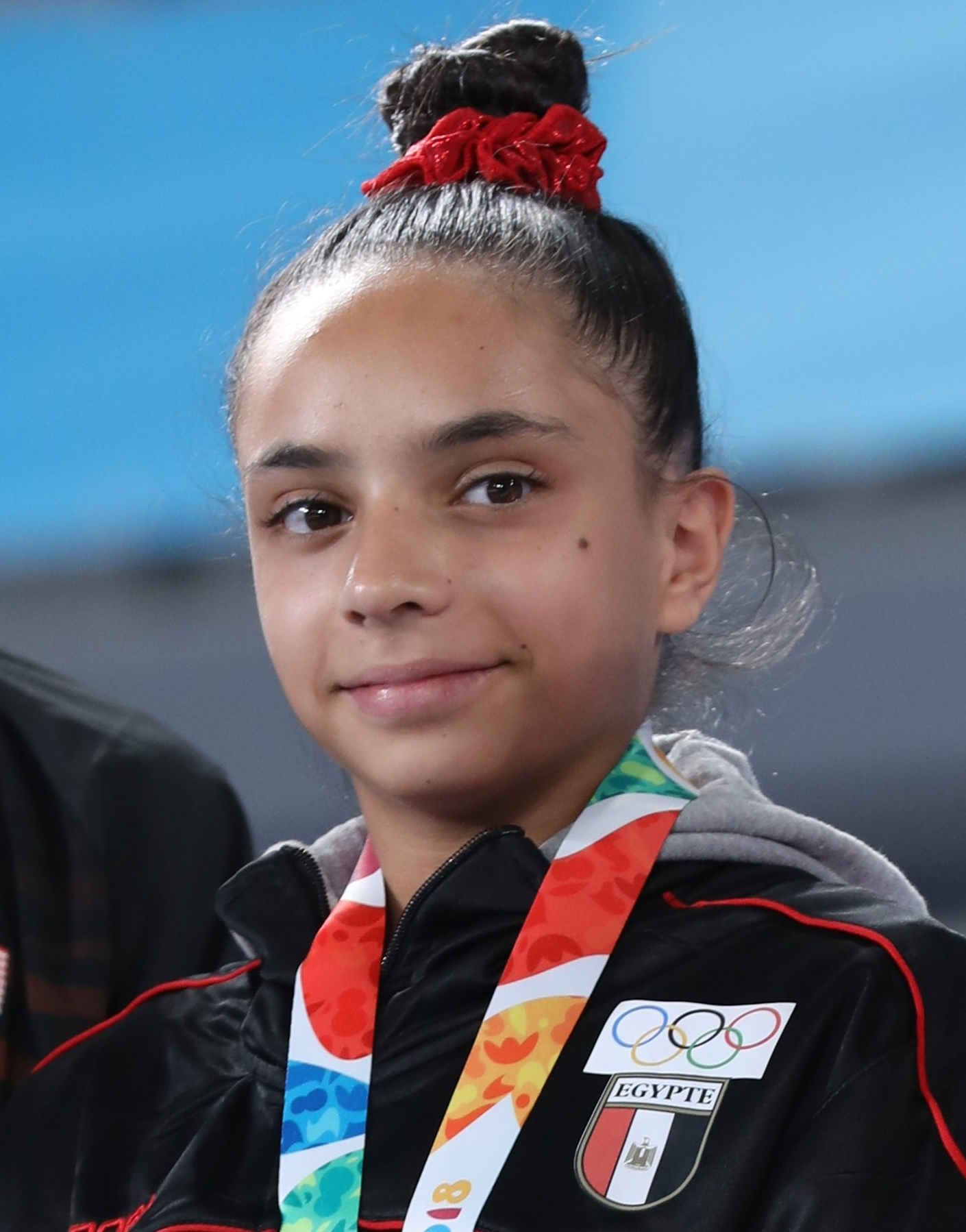
- Ibrahim at the 2018 Youth Olympic Games

Personal information
- Full name: Zeina Ibrahim Sharaf
- Born: 20 June 2003 (age 23) Alexandria, Egypt

Gymnastics career
- Discipline: Women's artistic gymnastics
- Country represented: Egypt; (2016–2022)
- Club: Smouha Club
- Head coach: Safinaz Karam
Medal record
Representing Egypt
African Games
Gold medal – first place	2019 Rabat	Team
Silver medal – second place	2019 Rabat	Uneven bars
African Championships
Gold medal – first place	2021 Cairo	All-around
Gold medal – first place	2022 Cairo	Team
Gold medal – first place	2022 Cairo	Balance beam
Silver medal – second place	2022 Cairo	Uneven bars
FIG World Cup
Event / 1st / 2nd / 3rd; World Challenge Cup / 0 / 0 / 1
Representing (International Olympic Committee) Mixed-NOCs
Youth Olympic Games
Silver medal – second place	2018 Buenos Aires	Mixed team

Zeina Ibrahim Sharaf (Arabic: زينة ابراهيم•شرف, born 20 June 2003) is an Egyptian artistic gymnast. She is the 2019 African Games team and uneven bars champion and the 2021 African all-around champion. She is also the 2022 African team and balance beam champion. She represented Egypt at the 2018 Youth Olympic Games and the 2020 Olympic Games.

== Personal life ==
Ibrahim was born in Alexandria in 2003. She speaks both Arabic and English.

== Junior gymnastics career ==
=== 2016–17 ===
Ibrahim made her international debut at the 2016 African Championships, where she helped Egypt place first in the team competition. She then competed at the Tournoi International in Combs-la-Ville, France where she placed 24th in the all-around. In 2017, Ibrahim only competed at the Egyptian Championships in Cairo where she placed fifth all-around in the junior division.

=== 2018 ===
Ibrahim started the season competing at the Stella Zakharova Cup in Kyiv, Ukraine, where she finished ninth in the all-around and sixth with the Egyptian team. In the event finals, she won bronze on the vault and gold on the balance beam by over half a point ahead of teammate Jana Mahmoud. She next competed at the African Championships where she helped Egypt win the gold medal as a team. Additionally, she placed third in the all-around and on uneven bars. In September, she competed at the Junior Mediterranean Championships where Egypt placed fourth as a team, and individually, she placed 15th in the all-around and sixth on uneven bars. Then in October, Ibrahim represented Egypt at the 2018 Youth Olympic Games in Buenos Aires. While there, she was assigned to the mixed multi-discipline team named after British gymnast Max Whitlock, and they won the silver medal behind the team named after American gymnast Simone Biles. Individually, Ibrahim qualified for the all-around final where she finished in 18th place.

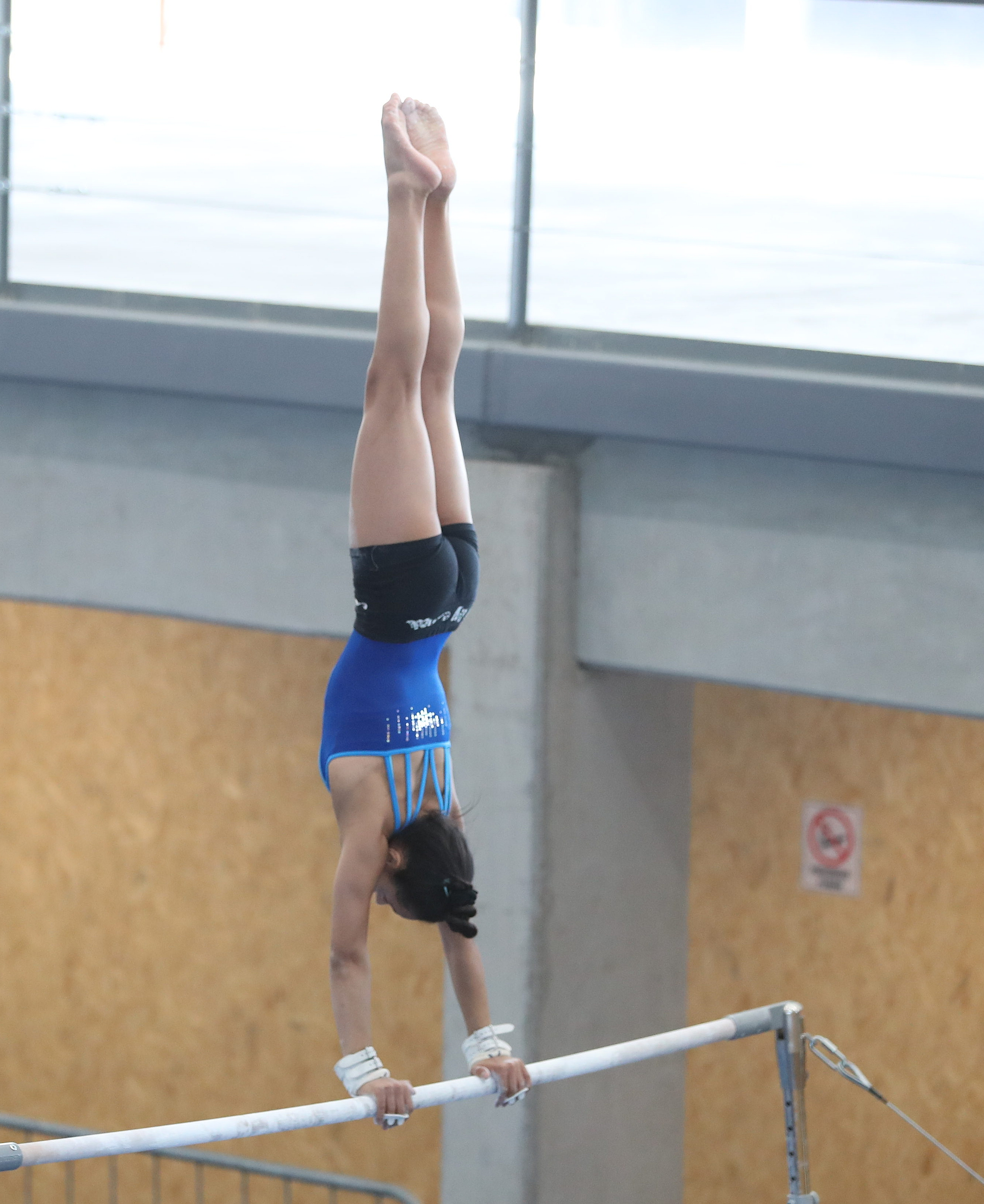
Uneven bars training

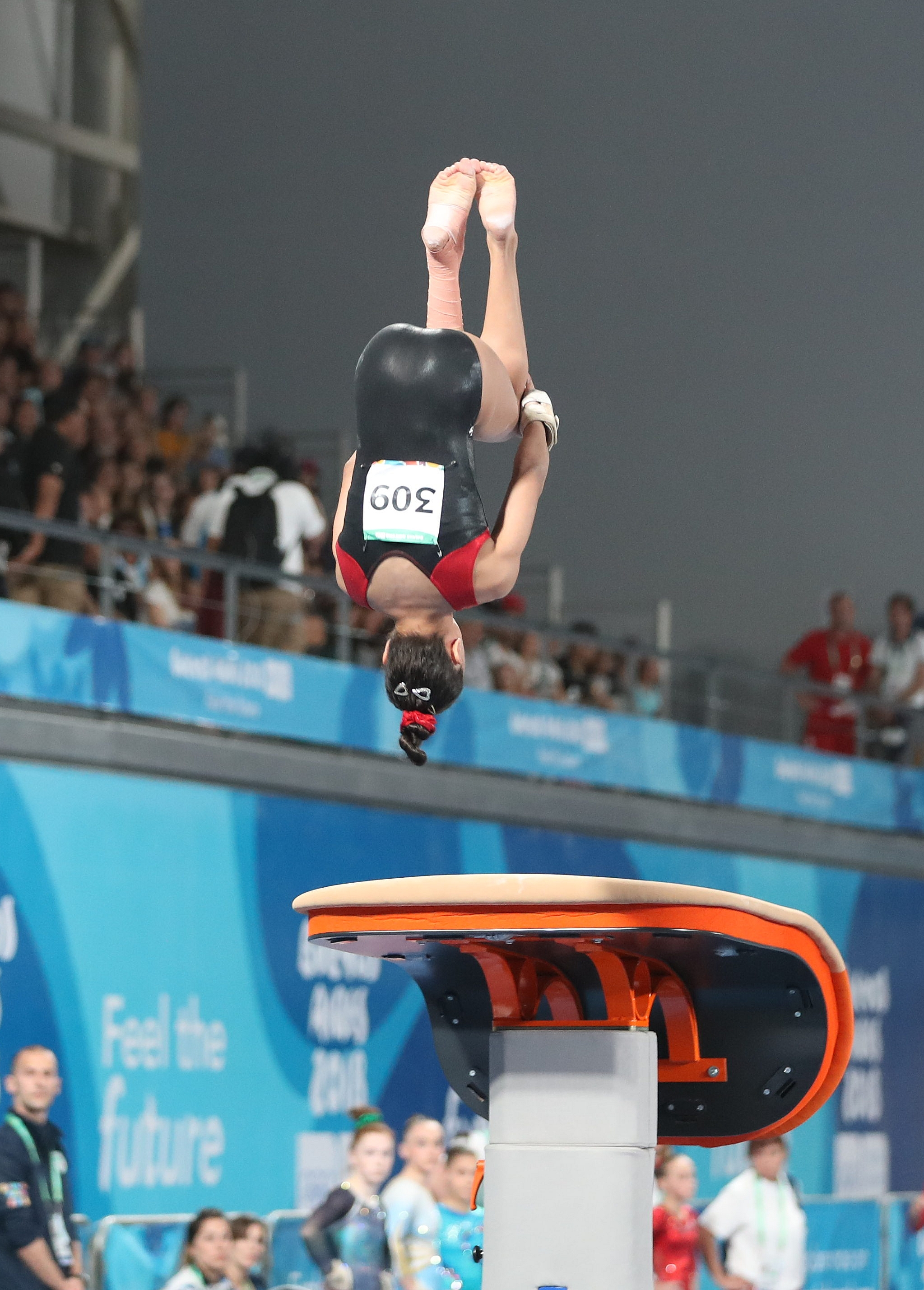
Vault qualification

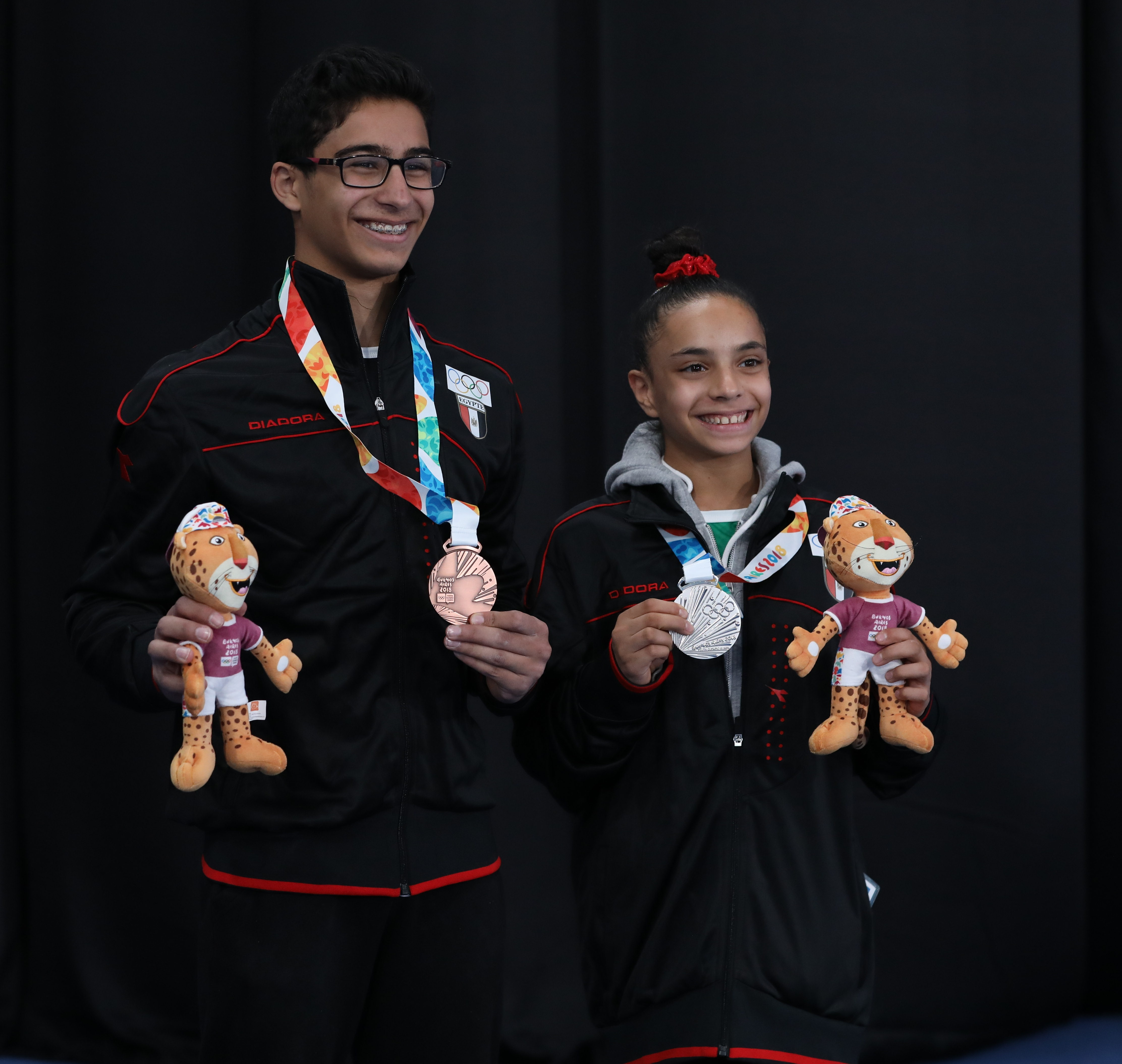
Ibrahim and compatriot Mohamed Afify with their mixed multi-discipline team medals

Ibrahim at the 2018 Youth Olympics

== Senior gymnastics career ==
=== 2019 ===
Ibrahim became age-eligible for senior competition in 2019 and made her senior debut at the African Games. She, along with teammates Farah Hussein, Farah Salem, Mandy Mohamed, and Nancy Taman, won gold in the team competition. Individually, Ibrahim won the silver medal on the uneven bars behind compatriot Hussein. In November, she competed at the Cottbus World Cup but did not advance into any finals.

=== 2021 ===
In May, Ibrahim competed at the 2021 African Championships in Cairo. She placed first in the all-around and qualified to compete at the 2020 Olympic Games. She next competed at the Cairo World Challenge Cup where she won the bronze medal on balance beam behind Larisa Iordache and Diana Varinska, and she finished sixth on the uneven bars. Then at the Doha World Cup, she finished fifth on the uneven bars and fourth on the balance beam. At the Olympic Games, Ibrahim finished 64th in the all-around during qualification round and did not advance to any finals.

=== 2022 ===
Ibrahim competed at the Cairo World Cup, where she finished seventh on the balance beam. She next competed at the Mediterranean Games alongside Jana Abdelsalam, Jana Aboelhasan, Jana Mahmoud, and Nour Swidan, and they finished sixth as a team. In July, Ibrahim she at the African Championships, where she helped Egypt finish first as a team. As a result, they qualified a team to compete at the upcoming World Championships. Individually, Ibrahim won gold on the balance beam and silver on the uneven bars behind Caitlin Rooskrantz of South Africa. She competed with the Egyptian team at the World Championships, and they placed 22nd in the qualification round.

== Competitive history ==
Year	Event	Team	AA	VT	UB	BB	FX
Junior
2016
2016	African Championships	1st place, gold medalist(s)					
2016	Tournoi International		24				
2017	Egyptian Championships		5				
2018	Stella Zakharova Cup	6	9	3rd place, bronze medalist(s)		1st place, gold medalist(s)	
2018	African Championships	1st place, gold medalist(s)	3rd place, bronze medalist(s)		3rd place, bronze medalist(s)		
2018	Mediterranean Championships	4	15		6		
2018	Youth Olympic Games	(silver) (Note: The teams were randomly assigned with gymnasts from different countries and disciplines)	18				
Senior
2019
2019	African Games	1st place, gold medalist(s)			2nd place, silver medalist(s)		
2021
2021	African Championships		1st place, gold medalist(s)				
2021	Cairo Challenge Cup				6	3rd place, bronze medalist(s)	
2021	Doha World Cup				5	4	
2021	Olympic Games		64				
2022	Cairo World Cup					7	
2022	Mediterranean Games	6					
2022	African Championships	1st place, gold medalist(s)			2nd place, silver medalist(s)	1st place, gold medalist(s)	
2022	World Championships	22					
