= Artistic gymnastics at the 2026 Mediterranean Games – Women's artistic qualification =

Women's artistic team all-around at the 2026 Mediterranean Games
- Venue: Grottaglie Sports Hall
- Date: 30 August 2026

The Women's artistic qualification competition at the 2026 Mediterranean Games was held on 30 August 2026 at the Grottaglie Sports Hall.

== Individual all-around ==
Rank	Gymnast	Vault (gymnastics)	Uneven bars	Balance beam	Floor (gymnastics)	Total	Qual.
1	Kaylia Nemour (ALG)	14.000	13.950	14.450	13.400	55.800	Q
2	Alba Petisco (ESP)	13.700	13.700	13.200	12.800	53.400	Q
3	Sofia Tonelli (ITA)	13.200	12.950	13.200	13.200	52.550	Q
4	Artemisia Iorfino (ITA)	13.150	13.800	12.450	12.250	51.650	Q
5	Benedetta Gava (ITA)	14.100	12.300	12.150	13.050	51.600	–
6	Alizée Letrange (FRA)	13.100	13.200	12.950	12.300	51.550	Q
7	Aitana Pacheco (ESP)	13.300	12.750	12.800	12.700	51.550	Q
8	Célia Serber (FRA)	13.400	13.350	12.750	11.750	51.250	Q
9	Marina Escudero (ESP)	13.750	11.650	11.700	12.900	50.000	–
10	Lucija Hribar (SLO)	13.100	12.750	11.500	11.900	49.250	Q
11	Athanasia Mesiri (GRE)	13.000	11.600	11.750	12.550	48.900	Q
12	Noélie Ayuso (FRA)	13.050	11.700	11.900	11.500	48.150	–
13	Mafalda Costa (POR)	12.800	11.400	11.400	11.850	47.450	Q
14	Mariana Parente (POR)	13.050	11.550	10.850	11.950	47.400	Q
15	Djenna Laroui (ALG)	11.900	12.100	11.300	11.900	47.200	Q
16	İlayda Şahin (TUR)	12.950	10.250	11.400	11.600	46.200	Q
17	Vita Prijanovič (SLO)	12.400	9.900	11.650	11.800	45.750	Q
18	Joana Reis (POR)	12.250	9.650	11.750	11.650	45.300	–
19	Olga Marina Kapoti (GRE)	12.350	10.750	10.450	11.500	45.050	Q
20	Christina Zwicker (CRO)	11.550	9.550	11.850	11.550	44.500	Q
21	Zeynep Kurtuluş (TUR)	12.050	11.700	8.850	11.750	44.350	Q
22	Georgia Charalampous (CYP)	11.950	11.100	9.750	9.900	42.700	Q
23	Eva Dionysiou (CYP)	11.800	9.050	8.800	9.650	39.300	R1
24	Kalypso Papaioannou (CYP)	11.950	5.050	8.600	9.100	34.700	–
25	Sara Mroueh (LBN)	11.500	5.350	8.150	9.100	34.100	R2
26	Danie Ferris (MAR)	0.000	11.350	7.650	10.450	29.450	R3

== Vault ==
Rank	Gymnast	Vault 1				Vault 2				Bonus	Total	Qual.
Rank	Gymnast	D Score	E Score	Pen.	Score 1	D Score	E Score	Pen.	Score 2	Bonus	Total	Qual.
1	Teja Belak (SLO)	4.4	8.800		13.200	4.6	8.950		13.550	0.2	13.575	Q
2	Benedetta Gava (ITA)	5.0	9.100		14.100	3.8	8.800	0.1	12.500	0.2	13.500	Q
3	Athanasia Mesiri (GRE)	4.2	8.800		13.000	4.6	8.650		13.250	0.2	13.325	Q
4	Aitana Pacheco (ESP)	4.4	8.900		13.300	4.2	9.050		13.250		13.275	Q
5	Marina Escudero (ESP)	5.0	8.750		13.750	3.6	8.650		12.250	0.2	13.200	Q
6	Célia Serber (FRA)	4.6	8.800		13.400	3.8	8.750		12.550		12.975	Q
7	Tjasa Kysselef (SLO)	4.6	8.600		13.200	3.6	8.600		12.200	0.2	12.900	Q
8	İlayda Şahin (TUR)	4.2	8.750		12.950	3.8	8.650		12.450	0.2	12.900	Q
9	Sihem Hamidi (ALG)	4.0	8.400		12.400	3.8	8.600		12.400	0.2	12.600	R1
10	Louna Hamames-Moallic (ALG)	4.2	8.750		12.950	3.4	8.650		12.050		12.500	R2
11	Christina Kiosi (GRE)	3.8	8.700		12.500	3.8	8.700		12.500		12.500	R3

== Uneven bars ==
Rank	Gymnast	D Score	E Score	Pen.	Total	Qual.
1	Kaylia Nemour (ALG)	6.6	7.350		13.950	Q
2	Artemisia Iorfino (ITA)	6.0	7.800		13.800	Q
3	Alba Petisco (ESP)	5.5	8.200		13.700	Q
4	Célia Serber (FRA)	5.5	7.850		13.350	Q
5	Alizée Letrange (FRA)	5.2	8.000		13.200	Q
6	Sofia Tonelli (ITA)	5.9	7.050		12.950	Q
7	Lucija Hribar (SLO)	4.8	7.950		12.750	Q
8	Aitana Pacheco (ESP)	5.0	7.750		12.750	Q
9	Erika Guindel (ESP)	5.2	7.400		12.600	–
10	Ceren Biner (TUR)	5.0	7.400		12.400	R1
11	Benedetta Gava (ITA)	4.9	7.400		12.300	–
12	Bengisu Yıldız (TUR)	4.9	7.400		12.300	R2
13	Eleonora Calaciura (ITA)	5.6	6.600		12.200	–
14	Djenna Laroui (ALG)	5.5	6.600		12.100	R3

== Balance beam ==
Rank	Gymnast	D Score	E Score	Pen.	Total	Qual.
1	Kaylia Nemour (ALG)	6.5	7.950		14.450	Q
2	Alba Petisco (ESP)	5.5	7.700		13.200	Q
3	Sofia Tonelli (ITA)	5.6	7.600		13.200	Q
4	Alizée Letrange (FRA)	5.0	7.950		12.950	Q
5	Eleonora Calaciura (ITA)	5.0	7.900		12.900	Q
6	Aitana Pacheco (ESP)	5.6	7.200		12.800	Q
7	Célia Serber (FRA)	5.3	7.450		12.750	Q
8	Artemisia Iorfino (ITA)	4.8	7.650		12.450	–
9	Benedetta Gava (ITA)	4.7	7.450		12.150	–
10	Noélie Ayuso (FRA)	4.7	7.300	0.1	11.900	–
11	Christina Zwicker (CRO)	5.0	6.850		11.850	Q
11	Sevgi Kayışoğlu (TUR)	5.0	6.850		11.850	Q
13	Athanasia Mesiri (GRE)	4.9	6.950	0.1	11.750	R1
14	Joana Reis (POR)	5.0	6.750		11.750	R2
15	Marina Escudero (ESP)	5.6	6.100		11.700	–
16	Vita Prijanovič (SLO)	5.2	6.450		11.650	R3

== Floor exercise ==
Rank	Gymnast	D Score	E Score	Pen.	Total	Qual.
1	Emma Fioravanti (ITA)	5.4	8.050		13.450	Q
2	Kaylia Nemour (ALG)	5.3	8.200	0.1	13.400	Q
3	Sofia Tonelli (ITA)	5.1	8.100		13.200	Q
4	Sevgi Kayışoğlu (TUR)	5.1	8.000		13.100	Q
5	Benedetta Gava (ITA)	5.3	7.850	0.1	13.050	–
6	Marina Escudero (ESP)	5.2	7.700		12.900	Q
7	Antea Šikić Kaučič (CRO)	5.1	7.700		12.800	Q
8	Alba Petisco (ESP)	5.3	7.500		12.800	Q
9	Aitana Pacheco (ESP)	5.1	7.600		12.700	–
10	Athanasia Mesiri (GRE)	4.9	7.650		12.550	Q
11	Leire Escauriaza (ESP)	4.7	7.800		12.500	–
12	Louna Hamames-Moallic (ALG)	4.7	7.650		12.350	R1
13	Alizée Letrange (FRA)	4.9	7.800	0.4	12.300	R2
14	Artemisia Iorfino (ITA)	4.9	7.450	0.1	12.250	–
15	Mariana Parente (POR)	4.4	7.550		11.950	R3
