= Artistic gymnastics at the 2026 Mediterranean Games – Women's balance beam =

Women's balance beam at the 2026 Mediterranean Games
- Venue: Grottaglie Sports Hall
- Date: 2 September 2026
- Competitors: 9
- Winning total: 13.300

Medalists
gold medal	(Algeria) Kaylia Nemour
silver medal	(Spain) Alba Petisco
bronze medal	(Italy) Eleonora Calaciura

The Women's uneven bars final at the 2026 Mediterranean Games was held on 2 September 2026 at the Grottaglie Sports Hall.

== Qualification ==
Rank	Gymnast	D Score	E Score	Pen.	Total	Qual.
1	Kaylia Nemour (ALG)	6.5	7.950		14.450	Q
2	Alba Petisco (ESP)	5.5	7.700		13.200	Q
3	Sofia Tonelli (ITA)	5.6	7.600		13.200	Q
4	Alizée Letrange (FRA)	5.0	7.950		12.950	Q
5	Eleonora Calaciura (ITA)	5.0	7.900		12.900	Q
6	Aitana Pacheco (ESP)	5.6	7.200		12.800	Q
7	Célia Serber (FRA)	5.3	7.450		12.750	Q
8	Artemisia Iorfino (ITA)	4.8	7.650		12.450	–
9	Benedetta Gava (ITA)	4.7	7.450		12.150	–
10	Noélie Ayuso (FRA)	4.7	7.300	0.1	11.900	–
11	Christina Zwicker (CRO)	5.0	6.850		11.850	Q
11	Sevgi Kayışoğlu (TUR)	5.0	6.850		11.850	Q
13	Athanasia Mesiri (GRE)	4.9	6.950	0.1	11.750	R1
14	Joana Reis (POR)	5.0	6.750		11.750	R2
15	Marina Escudero (ESP)	5.6	6.100		11.700	–
16	Vita Prijanovič (SLO)	5.2	6.450		11.650	R3

== Final ==
Rank	Gymnast	D Score	E Score	Pen.	Total
1st place, gold medalist(s)	Kaylia Nemour (ALG)	6.5	6.800		13.300
2nd place, silver medalist(s)	Alba Petisco (ESP)	5.5	7.700		13.200
3rd place, bronze medalist(s)	Eleonora Calaciura (ITA)	5.1	7.800		12.900
4	Alizée Letrange (FRA)	5.1	7.700		12.800
5	Sofia Tonelli (ITA)	4.7	7.500		12.200
6	Célia Serber (FRA)	4.7	7.350		12.050
7	Aitana Pacheco (ESP)	5.5	6.300		11.800
8	Christina Zwicker (CRO)	4.9	6.700		11.600
9	Sevgi Kayışoğlu (TUR)	4.8	5.750		10.550
