= Artistic gymnastics at the 2026 Mediterranean Games – Women's artistic individual all-around =

Women's artistic individual all-around at the 2026 Mediterranean Games
- Venue: Grottaglie Sports Hall
- Date: 1 September 2026
- Competitors: 18
- Winning total: 57.750

Medalists
gold medal	(Algeria) Kaylia Nemour
silver medal	(Spain) Alba Petisco
bronze medal	(Italy) Sofia Tonelli

The Women's artistic individual all-around competition at the 2026 Mediterranean Games was held on 1 September 2026 at the Grottaglie Sports Hall.

== Qualification ==
Rank	Gymnast	Vault (gymnastics)	Uneven bars	Balance beam	Floor (gymnastics)	Total	Qual.
1	Kaylia Nemour (ALG)	14.000	13.950	14.450	13.400	55.800	Q
2	Alba Petisco (ESP)	13.700	13.700	13.200	12.800	53.400	Q
3	Sofia Tonelli (ITA)	13.200	12.950	13.200	13.200	52.550	Q
4	Artemisia Iorfino (ITA)	13.150	13.800	12.450	12.250	51.650	Q
5	Benedetta Gava (ITA)	14.100	12.300	12.150	13.050	51.600	–
6	Alizée Letrange (FRA)	13.100	13.200	12.950	12.300	51.550	Q
7	Aitana Pacheco (ESP)	13.300	12.750	12.800	12.700	51.550	Q
8	Célia Serber (FRA)	13.400	13.350	12.750	11.750	51.250	Q
9	Marina Escudero (ESP)	13.750	11.650	11.700	12.900	50.000	–
10	Lucija Hribar (SLO)	13.100	12.750	11.500	11.900	49.250	Q
11	Athanasia Mesiri (GRE)	13.000	11.600	11.750	12.550	48.900	Q
12	Noélie Ayuso (FRA)	13.050	11.700	11.900	11.500	48.150	–
13	Mafalda Costa (POR)	12.800	11.400	11.400	11.850	47.450	Q
14	Mariana Parente (POR)	13.050	11.550	10.850	11.950	47.400	Q
15	Djenna Laroui (ALG)	11.900	12.100	11.300	11.900	47.200	Q
16	İlayda Şahin (TUR)	12.950	10.250	11.400	11.600	46.200	Q
17	Vita Prijanovič (SLO)	12.400	9.900	11.650	11.800	45.750	Q
18	Joana Reis (POR)	12.250	9.650	11.750	11.650	45.300	–
19	Olga Marina Kapoti (GRE)	12.350	10.750	10.450	11.500	45.050	Q
20	Christina Zwicker (CRO)	11.550	9.550	11.850	11.550	44.500	Q
21	Zeynep Kurtuluş (TUR)	12.050	11.700	8.850	11.750	44.350	Q
22	Georgia Charalampous (CYP)	11.950	11.100	9.750	9.900	42.700	Q
23	Eva Dionysiou (CYP)	11.800	9.050	8.800	9.650	39.300	R1
24	Kalypso Papaioannou (CYP)	11.950	5.050	8.600	9.100	34.700	–
25	Sara Mroueh (LBN)	11.500	5.350	8.150	9.100	34.100	R2
26	Danie Ferris (MAR)	0.000	11.350	7.650	10.450	29.450	R3

== Final ==
Position	Gymnast	Vault (gymnastics)	Uneven bars	Balance beam	Floor (gymnastics)	Total
1st place, gold medalist(s)	Kaylia Nemour (ALG)	13.800	15.650	14.700	13.600	57.750
2nd place, silver medalist(s)	Alba Petisco (ESP)	13.650	12.500	13.450	13.250	52.850
3rd place, bronze medalist(s)	Sofia Tonelli (ITA)	13.700	13.100	11.600	13.250	51.650
4	Artemisia Iorfino (ITA)	13.250	13.950	12.600	11.600	51.400
5	Alizée Letrange (FRA)	13.050	12.050	13.150	12.900	51.150
6	Aitana Pacheco (ESP)	12.900	12.950	11.950	13.150	50.950
7	Djenna Laroui (ALG)	12.650	13.300	12.200	12.450	50.600
8	Célia Serber (FRA)	13.000	13.400	12.550	11.550	50.500
9	Lucija Hribar (SLO)	13.100	12.500	11.550	12.250	49.400
10	Mafalda Costa (POR)	13.050	11.500	12.300	12.350	49.200
11	Mariana Parente (POR)	13.000	11.100	11.950	11.600	47.650
12	İlayda Şahin (TUR)	13.150	10.650	11.750	11.750	47.300
13	Vita Prijanovič (SLO)	12.450	10.000	12.750	11.650	46.850
14	Zeynep Kurtuluş (TUR)	12.000	12.050	10.650	12.050	46.750
15	Athanasia Mesiri (GRE)	13.000	11.250	9.300	13.100	46.650
16	Olga Marina Kapoti (GRE)	12.500	11.250	10.150	11.600	45.500
17	Christina Zwicker (CRO)	11.450	11.650	10.700	11.100	44.900
18	Georgia Charalampous (CYP)	12.050	11.050	10.250	9.250	42.600
