= Artistic gymnastics at the 2026 Mediterranean Games =

- Venue: Grottaglie Sports Hall
- Dates: 30 August – 2 September

The artistic gymnastics competitions at the 2026 Mediterranean Games in Taranto took place between 30 August and 2 September at the Grottaglie Sports Hall.

== Schedule ==
Q	Qualification	F	Final

Event↓/Date →	Sun 30	Mon 31	Tue 1	Wed 2
Women's individual all-around	Q		F	
Women's team all-around	F			
Women's vault	Q			F
Women's uneven bars	Q			F
Women's balance beam	Q			F
Women's floor	Q			F
Men's individual all-around		Q	F	
Men's team all-around		F		
Men's floor		Q		F
Men's pommel horse		Q		F
Men's rings		Q		F
Men's vault		Q		F
Men's parallel bars		Q		F
Men's horizontal bar		Q		F

== Medalists ==
=== Men ===
Event	Gold	Silver	Bronze
Team all-around	Turkey; Ferhat Arıcan; Alperen Ege Avcı; Altan Doğan; Mert Efe Kılıçer; Mehmet Ayberk Koşak; İbrahim Çolak	Italy; Tommaso Brugnami; Ivan Brunello; Matteo Levantesi; Stefano Patron; Niccolò Vannucchi; Diego Vazzola	Spain; Daniel Carrión Caro; Thierno Diallo; Sergio Kovacs; Nicolau Mir; Ignacio Yockers; Unai Baigorri
Individual all-around	Marios Georgiou; Cyprus	Nicolau Mir; Spain	Omar Mohamed; Egypt
Floor exercise	Antonios Tantalidis; Greece	Ivan Brunello; Italy	Niccolò Vannucchi; Italy
Pommel horse	Ignacio Yockers; Spain	Omar Elshobki; Egypt	Ferhat Arıcan; Turkey
Rings	Mehmet Ayberk Koşak; Turkey	Niccolò Vannucchi; Italy	Omar Mohamed; Egypt
Vault	Hamza Hossaini; Morocco	Tommaso Brugnami; Italy	Alperen Ege Avcı; Turkey
Parallel bars	Altan Doğan; Turkey	Marios Georgiou; Cyprus	Matteo Levantesi; Italy
Horizontal bar	Marios Georgiou; Cyprus	Swaimy Bellil; France	Neofytos Kyriakou; Cyprus

=== Women ===
Event	Gold	Silver	Bronze
Team all-around	Italy; Eleonora Calaciura; Emma Fioravanti; Benedetta Gava; Artemisia Iorfino; Sofia Tonelli; Angela Andreoli	Spain; Leire Escauriaza; Marina Escudero; Erika Guindel; Aitana Pacheco; Alba Petisco; Carlota Armenta	Algeria; Louna Hamames-Moallic; Sihem Hamidi; Léna Khenoun; Djenna Laroui; Kaylia Nemour; Malek Rezagui
Individual all-around	Kaylia Nemour; Algeria	Alba Petisco; Spain	Sofia Tonelli; Italy
Vault	Benedetta Gava; Italy	Athanasia Mesiri; Greece	Teja Belak; Slovenia
Uneven bars	Kaylia Nemour; Algeria	Sofia Tonelli; Italy	Artemisia Iorfino; Italy
Balance beam	Kaylia Nemour; Algeria	Alba Petisco; Spain	Eleonora Calaciura; Italy
Floor exercise	Benedetta Gava; Italy	Alba Petisco; Spain	Emma Fioravanti; Italy

== Medal table ==
* Host nation (Italy)

Rank	Nation	Gold	Silver	Bronze	Total
1	Italy*	3	5	6	14
2	Turkey	3	0	2	5
3	Algeria	3	0	1	4
4	Cyprus	2	1	1	4
5	Spain	1	5	1	7
6	Greece	1	1	0	2
7	Morocco	1	0	0	1
8	Egypt	0	1	2	3
9	France	0	1	0	1
10	Slovenia	0	0	1	1
Totals (10 entries)		14	14	14	42
