= Artistic gymnastics at the 2026 Mediterranean Games – Women's uneven bars =

Women's uneven bars at the 2026 Mediterranean Games
- Venue: Grottaglie Sports Hall
- Date: 2 September 2026
- Competitors: 8
- Winning total: 15.500

Medalists
| gold medal | (Algeria) Kaylia Nemour |
| silver medal | (Italy) Sofia Tonelli |
| bronze medal | (Italy) Artemisia Iorfino |

The Women's uneven bars final at the 2026 Mediterranean Games was held on 2 September 2026 at the Grottaglie Sports Hall.

== Qualification ==
| Rank | Gymnast | D Score | E Score | Pen. | Total | Qual. |
|---|---|---|---|---|---|---|
| 1 | Kaylia Nemour (ALG) | 6.6 | 7.350 | | 13.950 | Q |
| 2 | Artemisia Iorfino (ITA) | 6.0 | 7.800 | | 13.800 | Q |
| 3 | Alba Petisco (ESP) | 5.5 | 8.200 | | 13.700 | Q |
| 4 | Célia Serber (FRA) | 5.5 | 7.850 | | 13.350 | Q |
| 5 | Alizée Letrange (FRA) | 5.2 | 8.000 | | 13.200 | Q |
| 6 | Sofia Tonelli (ITA) | 5.9 | 7.050 | | 12.950 | Q |
| 7 | Lucija Hribar (SLO) | 4.8 | 7.950 | | 12.750 | Q |
| 8 | Aitana Pacheco (ESP) | 5.0 | 7.750 | | 12.750 | Q |
| 9 | Erika Guindel (ESP) | 5.2 | 7.400 | | 12.600 | – |
| 10 | Ceren Biner (TUR) | 5.0 | 7.400 | | 12.400 | R1 |
| 11 | Benedetta Gava (ITA) | 4.9 | 7.400 | | 12.300 | – |
| 12 | Bengisu Yıldız (TUR) | 4.9 | 7.400 | | 12.300 | R2 |
| 13 | Eleonora Calaciura (ITA) | 5.6 | 6.600 | | 12.200 | – |
| 14 | Djenna Laroui (ALG) | 5.5 | 6.600 | | 12.100 | R3 |

== Final ==
| Rank | Gymnast | D Score | E Score | Pen. | Total |
|---|---|---|---|---|---|
| 1st place, gold medalist(s) | Kaylia Nemour (ALG) | 7.1 | 8.400 | | 15.500 |
| 2nd place, silver medalist(s) | Sofia Tonelli (ITA) | 6.1 | 8.000 | | 14.100 |
| 3rd place, bronze medalist(s) | Artemisia Iorfino (ITA) | 5.9 | 7.900 | | 13.800 |
| 4 | Alba Petisco (ESP) | 5.5 | 8.050 | | 13.550 |
| 5 | Lucija Hribar (SLO) | 5.4 | 8.000 | | 13.400 |
| 6 | Célia Serber (FRA) | 5.2 | 8.150 | | 13.350 |
| 7 | Aitana Pacheco (ESP) | 4.9 | 7.350 | | 12.250 |
| 8 | Alizée Letrange (FRA) | 5.2 | 6.950 | | 12.150 |
