= Gymnastics at the 2022 Mediterranean Games – Women's uneven bars =

Uneven Bars

Women's uneven bars at the 2022 Mediterranean Games
- Venue: Miloud Hadefi Complex Omnisport Arena
- Date: 29 June 2022
- Competitors: 8
- Winning total: 14.000

Medalists
gold medal	(Italy) Giorgia Villa
silver medal	(Italy) Martina Maggio
bronze medal	(Portugal) Ana Filipa Martins

The Women's uneven bars competition at the 2022 Mediterranean Games was held on 29 June 2022 at the Miloud Hadefi Complex Omnisport Arena.

== Qualification ==
Position	Gymnast	D-score	E-score	Penalty	Total	Notes
1	Giorgia Villa (ITA)	5.8	8.050		13.850	Q
2	Ana Filipa Martins (POR)	6.2	7.650		13.850	Q
3	Martina Maggio (ITA)	5.9	7.900		13.800	Q
4	Lorette Charpy (FRA)	5.7	7.950		13.650	~~Q~~ WD
5	Asia D'Amato (ITA)	6.0	7.600		13.600	–
6	Carolann Héduit (FRA)	6.0	7.500		13.500	Q
7	Lucija Hribar (SLO)	4.8	8.050		12.850	Q
8	Célia Serber (FRA)	5.6	7.200		12.800	– Sub
9	Nazlı Savranbaşı (TUR)	5.2	7.550		12.750	Q
10	Alice D'Amato (ITA)	6.0	6.750		12.750	–
11	Zala Trtnik (SLO)	4.4	8.000		12.400	Q
12	Djenna Laroui (FRA)	5.3	7.050		12.350	–
13	Alba Petisco (ESP)	5.3	6.750		12.050	R1
14	Jana Abdelsalam (EGY)	4.8	7.100		11.900	R2
15	Lorena Medina (ESP)	4.7	7.150		11.850	R3

== Final ==
Position	Gymnast	D-score	E-score	Penalty	Total
1st place, gold medalist(s)	Giorgia Villa (ITA)	5.8	8.200		14.000
2nd place, silver medalist(s)	Martina Maggio (ITA)	6.0	7.850		13.850
3rd place, bronze medalist(s)	Ana Filipa Martins (POR)	6.2	7.650		13.850
4	Lucija Hribar (SLO)	5.0	8.150		13.150
5	Zala Trtnik (SLO)	4.4	8.200		12.600
6	Carolann Héduit (FRA)	5.8	6.600		12.400
7	Célia Serber (FRA)	5.3	6.950		12.250
8	Nazlı Savranbaşı (TUR)	4.7	5.500		10.200
