= Artistic gymnastics at the 2026 Mediterranean Games – Women's floor =

Women's floor at the 2026 Mediterranean Games
- Venue: Grottaglie Sports Hall
- Date: 2 September 2026
- Competitors: 8
- Winning total: 13.300

Medalists
gold medal	(Italy) Benedetta Gava
silver medal	(Spain) Alba Petisco
bronze medal	(Italy) Emma Fioravanti

The Women's floor final at the 2026 Mediterranean Games was held on 2 September 2026 at the Grottaglie Sports Hall.

== Qualification ==
Rank	Gymnast	D Score	E Score	Pen.	Total	Qual.
1	Emma Fioravanti (ITA)	5.4	8.050		13.450	Q
2	Kaylia Nemour (ALG)	5.3	8.200	0.1	13.400	Q
3	Sofia Tonelli (ITA)	5.1	8.100		13.200	~~Q~~ WD
4	Sevgi Kayışoğlu (TUR)	5.1	8.000		13.100	Q
5	Benedetta Gava (ITA)	5.3	7.850	0.1	13.050	– Sub
6	Marina Escudero (ESP)	5.2	7.700		12.900	Q
7	Antea Šikić Kaučič (CRO)	5.1	7.700		12.800	Q
8	Alba Petisco (ESP)	5.3	7.500		12.800	Q
9	Aitana Pacheco (ESP)	5.1	7.600		12.700	–
10	Athanasia Mesiri (GRE)	4.9	7.650		12.550	Q
11	Leire Escauriaza (ESP)	4.7	7.800		12.500	–
12	Louna Hamames-Moallic (ALG)	4.7	7.650		12.350	R1
13	Alizée Letrange (FRA)	4.9	7.800	0.4	12.300	R2
14	Artemisia Iorfino (ITA)	4.9	7.450	0.1	12.250	–
15	Mariana Parente (POR)	4.4	7.550		11.950	R3

== Final ==
Rank	Gymnast	D Score	E Score	Pen.	Total
1st place, gold medalist(s)	Benedetta Gava (ITA)	5.3	8.000		13.300
2nd place, silver medalist(s)	Alba Petisco (ESP)	5.3	7.900		13.200
3rd place, bronze medalist(s)	Emma Fioravanti (ITA)	5.4	7.400		12.800
4	Marina Escudero (ESP)	5.1	7.600		12.700
5	Sevgi Kayışoğlu (TUR)	5.1	7.550		12.650
6	Athanasia Mesiri (GRE)	5.1	7.250	-0.1	12.250
7	Kaylia Nemour (ALG)	4.9	7.050		11.950
8	Antea Šikić Kaučič (CRO)	4.9	6.600		11.500
