= Artistic gymnastics at the 2026 Mediterranean Games – Women's artistic team all-around =

Women's artistic team all-around at the 2026 Mediterranean Games
- Venue: Grottaglie Sports Hall
- Date: 30 August 2026
- Competitors: 51 from 9 nations
- Winning total: 157.750

Medalists
| gold medal | Eleonora Calaciura; Emma Fioravanti; Benedetta Gava; Artemisia Iorfino; Sofia Tonelli; Angela Andreoli | Italy |
| silver medal | Leire Escauriaza; Marina Escudero; Erika Guindel; Aitana Pacheco; Alba Petisco; Carlota Armenta | Spain |
| bronze medal | Louna Hamames-Moallic; Sihem Hamidi; Léna Khenoun; Djenna Laroui; Kaylia Nemour; Malek Rezagui | Algeria |

The Women's artistic team all-around competition at the 2026 Mediterranean Games was held on 30 August 2026 at the Grottaglie Sports Hall.

== Qualified teams ==
The following NOCs competed as a team for the event.

- Algeria
- Cyprus
- Spain
- France
- Greece
- Italy
- Portugal
- Slovenia
- Turkey

== Final ==
| Rank | Team | Vault (gymnastics) | Uneven bars | Balance beam | Floor (gymnastics) | Total |
|---|---|---|---|---|---|---|
| 1st place, gold medalist(s) | Italy | 40.450 | 39.050 | 38.550 | 39.700 | 157.750 |
| 1st place, gold medalist(s) | Eleonora Calaciura (ITA) | | 12.200 | 12.900 | | 157.750 |
| 1st place, gold medalist(s) | Emma Fioravanti (ITA) | 13.150 | | | 13.450 | 157.750 |
| 1st place, gold medalist(s) | Benedetta Gava (ITA) | 14.100 | 12.300 | 12.150 | 13.050 | 157.750 |
| 1st place, gold medalist(s) | Artemisia Iorfino (ITA) | 13.150 | 13.800 | 12.450 | 12.250 | 157.750 |
| 1st place, gold medalist(s) | Sofia Tonelli (ITA) | 13.200 | 12.950 | 13.200 | 13.200 | 157.750 |
| 2nd place, silver medalist(s) | Spain | 40.750 | 39.050 | 37.700 | 38.400 | 155.900 |
| 2nd place, silver medalist(s) | Leire Escauriaza (ESP) | 13.250 | | | 12.500 | 155.900 |
| 2nd place, silver medalist(s) | Marina Escudero (ESP) | 13.750 | 11.650 | 11.700 | 12.900 | 155.900 |
| 2nd place, silver medalist(s) | Erika Guindel (ESP) | | 12.600 | 10.350 | | 155.900 |
| 2nd place, silver medalist(s) | Aitana Pacheco (ESP) | 13.300 | 12.750 | 12.800 | 12.700 | 155.900 |
| 2nd place, silver medalist(s) | Alba Petisco (ESP) | 13.700 | 13.700 | 13.200 | 12.800 | 155.900 |
| 3rd place, bronze medalist(s) | Algeria | 39.350 | 37.700 | 37.000 | 37.650 | 151.700 |
| 3rd place, bronze medalist(s) | Louna Hamames-Moallic (ALG) | 12.950 | | 11.250 | 12.350 | 151.700 |
| 3rd place, bronze medalist(s) | Sihem Hamidi (ALG) | 12.400 | 10.350 | | | 151.700 |
| 3rd place, bronze medalist(s) | Léna Khenoun (ALG) | | 11.650 | 9.750 | 11.400 | 151.700 |
| 3rd place, bronze medalist(s) | Djenna Laroui (ALG) | 11.900 | 12.100 | 11.300 | 11.900 | 151.700 |
| 3rd place, bronze medalist(s) | Kaylia Nemour (ALG) | 14.000 | 13.950 | 14.450 | 13.400 | 151.700 |
| 4 | France | 39.550 | 38.250 | 37.600 | 35.700 | 151.100 |
| 4 | Noélie Ayuso (FRA) | 13.050 | 11.700 | 11.900 | 11.500 | 151.100 |
| 4 | Romane Hamelin (FRA) | | 11.550 | 11.400 | | 151.100 |
| 4 | Lilly Havard (FRA) | 12.900 | | | 11.650 | 151.100 |
| 4 | Alizée Letrange (FRA) | 13.100 | 13.200 | 12.950 | 12.300 | 151.100 |
| 4 | Célia Serber (FRA) | 13.400 | 13.350 | 12.750 | 11.750 | 151.100 |
| 5 | Turkey | 38.050 | 36.400 | 32.100 | 36.450 | 143.000 |
| 5 | Ceren Biner (TUR) | | 12.400 | 8.050 | | 143.000 |
| 5 | Sevgi Kayışoğlu (TUR) | 13.050 | | 11.850 | 13.100 | 143.000 |
| 5 | Zeynep Kurtuluş (TUR) | 12.050 | 11.700 | 8.850 | 11.750 | 143.000 |
| 5 | İlayda Şahin (TUR) | 12.950 | 10.250 | 11.400 | 11.600 | 143.000 |
| 5 | Bengisu Yıldız (TUR) | | 12.300 | | 10.250 | 143.000 |
| 6 | Portugal | 38.100 | 32.600 | 34.000 | 35.450 | 139.850 |
| 6 | Malfada Costa (POR) | 12.800 | 11.400 | 11.400 | 11.850 | 139.850 |
| 6 | Joana Reis (POR) | 12.250 | 9.650 | 11.750 | 11.650 | 139.850 |
| 6 | Mariana Parente (POR) | 13.050 | 11.500 | 10.850 | 11.950 | 139.850 |
| 7 | Greece | 37.850 | 31.350 | 33.650 | 35.550 | 138.400 |
| 7 | Anastasia Chantzi (GRE) | 12.150 | 7.400 | 9.250 | | 138.400 |
| 7 | Olga Marina Kapoti (GRE) | 12.350 | 10.750 | 10.450 | 11.500 | 138.400 |
| 7 | Christina Kiosi (GRE) | 12.500 | | 11.450 | 11.500 | 138.400 |
| 7 | Maria-Sofia Livogianni (GRE) | | 9.000 | | 11.000 | 138.400 |
| 7 | Athanasia Mesiri (GRE) | 13.000 | 11.600 | 11.750 | 12.550 | 138.400 |
| 8 | Slovenia | 39.500 | 22.650 | 34.150 | 23.700 | 120.000 |
| 8 | Teja Belak (SLO) | 13.200 | | | | 120.000 |
| 8 | Lucija Hribar (SLO) | 13.100 | 12.750 | 11.500 | 11.900 | 120.000 |
| 8 | Tjaša Kysselef (SLO) | 13.200 | | | | 120.000 |
| 8 | Vita Prijanovič (SLO) | 12.400 | 9.900 | 11.650 | 11.800 | 120.000 |
| 8 | Zala Trtnik (SLO) | | | 11.000 | | 120.000 |
| 9 | Cyprus | 35.700 | 25.200 | 27.150 | 28.650 | 116.700 |
| 9 | Georgia Charalampous (CYP) | 11.950 | 11.100 | 9.750 | 9.900 | 116.700 |
| 9 | Eva Dionysiou (CYP) | 11.800 | 9.050 | 8.800 | 9.650 | 116.700 |
| 9 | Kalypso Papaioannou (CYP) | 11.950 | 5.050 | 8.600 | 9.100 | 116.700 |
