= List of Olympic female artistic gymnasts for Algeria =

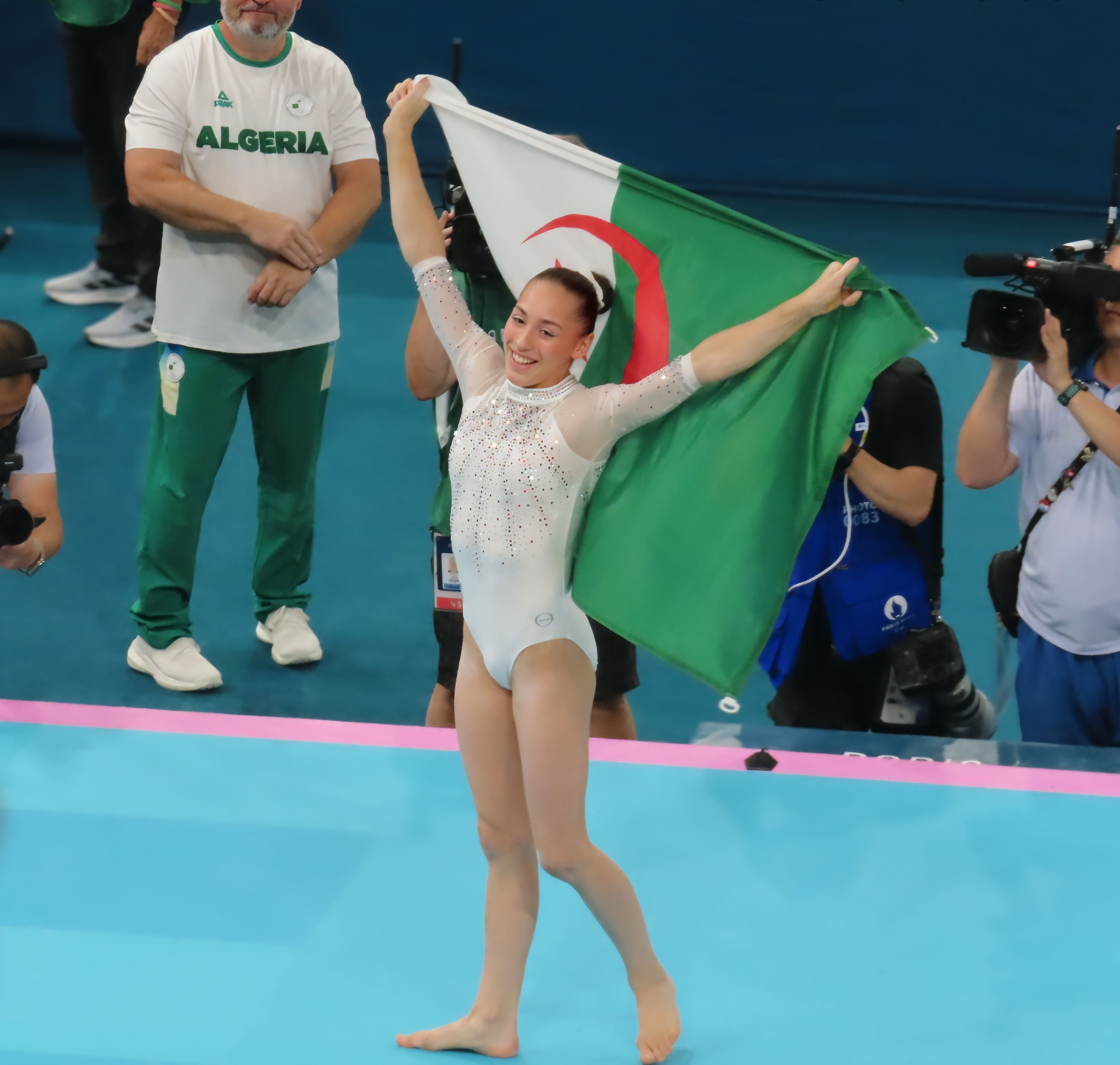
Kaylia Nemour at the 2024 Olympic Games

Gymnastics events have been staged at the Olympic Games since 1896. Farah Boufadene became the first Algerian female artistic gymnast to compete at the Olympic Games, doing so in 2016. Kaylia Nemour won the gold medal on uneven bars at the 2024 Olympic Games. In doing so, she became the first Algerian gymnast, as well as the first gymnast from the African continent, to win an Olympic medal.

== Gymnasts ==
Gymnast	Years
Farah Boufadene	2016
Kaylia Nemour	2024

== Medalists ==
Medal	Name	Year	Event
Gold	Kaylia Nemour	(France) 2024 Paris	Women's uneven bars

== See also ==
- Algeria women's national artistic gymnastics team
