= Sofia Tonelli =

Italian artistic gymnast

- Born: 18 November 2007 (age 18) Empoli, Florence, Tuscany

Gymnastics career
- Discipline: Women's artistic gymnastics
- Country represented: Italy; (2022–present)
- Club: Fiamme Oro
- Gym: Brixia
- Head coach: Silvia Ulivieri
Medal record
Representing Italy
European Championships
Gold medal – first place	2025 Leipzig	Team
Bronze medal – third place	2025 Leipzig	Balance beam
Mediterranean Games
Gold medal – first place	2026 Taranto	Team
Silver medal – second place	2026 Taranto	Uneven bars
Bronze medal – third place	2026 Taranto	All-around

Sofia Tonelli (born 18 November 2007) is an Italian artistic gymnast. She was a member of the gold medal winning team at the 2025 European Championships where she also won the bronze medal on balance beam.

== Early life ==
Tonelli was born in Empoli, Florence, Tuscany in 2007.

== Gymnastics career ==
=== 2025 ===
Tonelli competed at the 2025 City of Jesolo Trophy where she placed thirteenth in the all-around but won gold with the Italian team. She was selected to compete at the 2025 European Championships alongside Manila Esposito, Alice D'Amato, Emma Fioravanti, and Giulia Perotti. While there she helped Italy win gold as a team. Individually she qualified to the all-around and balance beam finals. During the all-around final she finished ninth. She was subbed into the uneven bars final when Helen Kevric withdrew due to injury; Tonelli finished sixth. During the balance beam final she won bronze behind Nina Derwael and Ana Bărbosu.

=== 2026 ===
At the 2026 City of Jesolo Trophy, Tonelli competed as part of the Italy 2 team, which won bronze. She also qualified for the uneven bars final, placing sixth.

Tonelli next competed at the 2026 Mediterranean Games, winning team gold for Italy with teammates Emma Fioravanti, Benedetta Gava, Artemisia Iorfino, and Eleonora Calaciura. Tonelli also won bronze in the all-around final, as well as silver on uneven bars behind Kaylia Nemour of Algeria.

== Competitive history ==
Competitive history of Sofia Tonelli
Year	Event	Team	AA	VT	UB	BB	FX
2020	Italian Gold Championships (junior)		6	5	2nd place, silver medalist(s)	2nd place, silver medalist(s)	2nd place, silver medalist(s)
2021	Italian Gold Championships (junior)		9	1st place, gold medalist(s)			5
2023	City of Jesolo Trophy		16				
2023	Italian Championships		14			8	
2023	Italian Gold Championships		1st place, gold medalist(s)	2nd place, silver medalist(s)	3rd place, bronze medalist(s)	2nd place, silver medalist(s)	3rd place, bronze medalist(s)
2024	City of Jesolo Trophy	6	11				
2024	Italian Gold Championships		1st place, gold medalist(s)	1st place, gold medalist(s)	1st place, gold medalist(s)	7	2nd place, silver medalist(s)
2025	City of Jesolo Trophy	1st place, gold medalist(s)	13				
2025	European Championships	1st place, gold medalist(s)	9		6	3rd place, bronze medalist(s)	
2026	City of Jesolo Trophy	3rd place, bronze medalist(s)			6		
2026	Osijek World Cup						
2026	Mediterranean Games	1st place, gold medalist(s)	3rd place, bronze medalist(s)		2nd place, silver medalist(s)		WD
2026	World Championships	7	14				
