= Arab Gymnastics Championships =

- Status: active
- Genre: sporting event
- Date: end-year
- Frequency: annual
- Country: varying
- Inaugurated: 2018

The Arab Gymnastics Championships (Arabic: البطولة العربية للجمباز) is a competition which is organized by the Arab Gymnastics Union for Arab countries for the gymnastics disciplines artistic and rhythmic.

== Editions ==
Edition	Year	City	Venue	Date	Countries	Athletes	Events	Champion			Ref.
Edition	Year	City	Venue	Date	Countries	Athletes	Events	Men	Women	Total	Ref.
1	2018	(Morocco) Marrakesh	Salle M'hamid de Gymnastique	21–28 December	12			Algeria	Morocco	Morocco	
2	2019	(Tunisia) Tunis	El Menzah Sports Palace	23 October–3 November	12	300			Egypt		
–	2020	Cancelled because of the COVID-19 pandemic									
–	2021	Cancelled because of the COVID-19 pandemic									
3	2022	(Algeria) Oran	Oran Olympic Hall "Miloud Hadefi"	30 September–6 October	7	82		Egypt	Algeria	Egypt	
