= Artistic gymnastics at the 2026 Mediterranean Games – Women's vault =

Women's vault at the 2026 Mediterranean Games
- Venue: Grottaglie Sports Hall
- Date: 2 September 2026
- Competitors: 8
- Winning total: 13.675

Medalists
gold medal	(Italy) Benedetta Gava
silver medal	(Greece) Athanasia Mesiri
bronze medal	(Slovenia) Teja Belak

The Women's vault final at the 2026 Mediterranean Games was held on 2 September 2026 at the Grottaglie Sports Hall.

== Qualification ==
Rank	Gymnast	Vault 1				Vault 2				Bonus	Total	Qual.
Rank	Gymnast	D Score	E Score	Pen.	Score 1	D Score	E Score	Pen.	Score 2	Bonus	Total	Qual.
1	Teja Belak (SLO)	4.4	8.800		13.200	4.6	8.950		13.550	0.2	13.575	Q
2	Benedetta Gava (ITA)	5.0	9.100		14.100	3.8	8.800	-0.1	12.500	0.2	13.500	Q
3	Athanasia Mesiri (GRE)	4.2	8.800		13.000	4.6	8.650		13.250	0.2	13.325	Q
4	Aitana Pacheco (ESP)	4.4	8.900		13.300	4.2	9.050		13.250		13.275	Q
5	Marina Escudero (ESP)	5.0	8.750		13.750	3.6	8.650		12.250	0.2	13.200	Q
6	Célia Serber (FRA)	4.6	8.800		13.400	3.8	8.750		12.550		12.975	Q
7	Tjaša Kysselef (SLO)	4.6	8.600		13.200	3.6	8.600		12.200	0.2	12.900	Q
8	İlayda Şahin (TUR)	4.2	8.750		12.950	3.8	8.650		12.450	0.2	12.900	Q
9	Sihem Hamidi (ALG)	4.0	8.400		12.400	3.8	8.600		12.400	0.2	12.600	R1
10	Louna Hamames-Moallic (ALG)	4.2	8.750		12.950	3.4	8.650		12.050		12.500	R2
11	Christina Kiosi (GRE)	3.8	8.700		12.500	3.8	8.700		12.500		12.500	R3

== Final ==
Rank	Gymnast	Vault 1				Vault 2				Bonus	Total
Rank	Gymnast	D Score	E Score	Pen.	Score 1	D Score	E Score	Pen.	Score 2	Bonus	Total
1st place, gold medalist(s)	Benedetta Gava (ITA)	5.0	9.100	-0.1	14.000	3.8	9.150		12.950	0.2	13.675
2nd place, silver medalist(s)	Athanasia Mesiri (GRE)	4.2	9.000		13.200	4.6	8.800		13.400	0.2	13.500
3rd place, bronze medalist(s)	Teja Belak (SLO)	4.4	8.350		12.750	4.6	9.050		13.650	0.2	13.400
4	Aitana Pacheco (ESP)	4.4	8.950		13.350	4.2	8.950		13.150		13.250
5	Célia Serber (FRA)	4.6	9.050		13.650	3.8	8.700		12.500		13.075
6	Marina Escudero (ESP)	5.0	8.500	-0.1	13.400	3.6	8.750		12.350	0.2	13.075
7	Tjaša Kysselef (SLO)	4.6	8.600		13.200	4.2	7.450		11.650		12.425
8	İlayda Şahin (TUR)	4.2	8.800		13.000	3.8	7.800		11.600		12.300
