= Altan Doğan =

Turkish artistic gymnast

- Doğan at the 2022 European Championships

Personal information
- Full name: Altan Doğan
- Born: 7 June 2005 (age 21) Konak, İzmir, Turkey

Gymnastics career
- Discipline: Men's artistic gymnastics
- Country represented: Turkey; (2022–present)
- College team: Ege University
- Club: İzmir Metropolitan Municipality Sports Club
- Head coach: Reyhan Karanlık
Medal record
Representing Turkey
Mediterranean Games
Gold medal – first place	2026 Taranto	Team
Gold medal – first place	2026 Taranto	Parallel bars

Altan Doğan (born 7 June 2005) is a Turkish artistic gymnast. He was part of the gold medal winning team at the 2026 Mediterranean Games where he also won parallel bars gold.

== Gymnastics career ==
As a junior, Doğan competed at the 2022 Gymnasiade where he helped Turkey win silver as a team. At the 2022 Junior European Championships, he helped Turkey finish ninth as a team. Doğan was selected as the alternate for the team for the 2023 Junior World Championships.

Doğan turned senior in 2024. He competed at the 2025 World University Games where he placed seventh on parallel bars. He made his World Championships debut at the 2025 edition but did not qualify for any finals.

At the 2026 European Championships, Doğan qualified to the parallel bars final where he finished fifth. He next competed at the 2026 Mediterranean Games where he helped Turkey win gold as a team. Individually he won gold on parallel bars and placed seventh on rings.

== Competitive history ==
Competitive history of Altan Doğan at the junior level
Year	Event	Team	AA	FX	PH	SR	VT	PB	HB
2021	Turkish Championships		2nd place, silver medalist(s)	5	3rd place, bronze medalist(s)	1st place, gold medalist(s)		1st place, gold medalist(s)	2nd place, silver medalist(s)
2021	Ukraine International Cup		14						
2021	Turkish Team Championships							1st place, gold medalist(s)	
2022	Gymnasiade	2nd place, silver medalist(s)				7		4	
2022	Junior European Championships	9	31					8	
2022	Balkan Championships	1st place, gold medalist(s)	1st place, gold medalist(s)	1st place, gold medalist(s)		1st place, gold medalist(s)		1st place, gold medalist(s)	1st place, gold medalist(s)
2022	Turkish Championships		1st place, gold medalist(s)	6	5	1st place, gold medalist(s)		3rd place, bronze medalist(s)	1st place, gold medalist(s)
2023
2023	Junior World Championships	10 (Note: Doğan was the team TUR alternate)							
2023	Turkish Championships		2nd place, silver medalist(s)	5		1st place, gold medalist(s)		1st place, gold medalist(s)	
2023	Mediterranean Championships	2nd place, silver medalist(s)	7	2nd place, silver medalist(s)		1st place, gold medalist(s)			3rd place, bronze medalist(s)

Competitive history of Altan Doğan at the senior level
Year	Event	Team	AA	FX	PH	SR	VT	PB	HB
2024	Varna World Challenge Cup							6	
2024	Turkish Championships		7						
2024	Szombathely World Challenge Cup								R2
2025	Baku World Cup							6	
2025	DTB Pokal Team Challenge	14							
2025	Doha World Cup							4	
2025	Turkish Team Championships	5	8					1st place, gold medalist(s)	
2025	World University Games	12					7		
2025	Turkish Championships		3rd place, bronze medalist(s)			3rd place, bronze medalist(s)		2nd place, silver medalist(s)	4
2025	Szombathely World Challenge Cup							5	
2025	World Championships							90	77
2026	Cairo World Cup								7
2026	Varna World Challenge Cup					7		1st place, gold medalist(s)	
2026	European Championships	14						5	
2026	Mediterranean Games	1st place, gold medalist(s)				7		1st place, gold medalist(s)	
