= 2022 Arab Gymnastics Championships =

- Venue: Miloud Hadefi Complex Omnisport Arena
- Location: Oran, Algeria
- Start date: 30 September
- End date: 6 October
- Competitors: 82 from 7 nations

The 2022 Arab Gymnastics Championships (Arabic: البطولة العربية للجمباز 2022) was the third edition of the Arab Gymnastics Championships, and were held in Oran, Algeria from 30 September to 6 October 2022. Seven Arab countries, also took part in the competition with 82 men and women athletes from senior and youth categories.

== Participating nations ==
The 7 participated nations are:

- Algeria (hosts)
- Egypt
- Jordan
- Kuwait
- Palestine
- Qatar
- Yemen
- Morocco (withrew)

== Venue ==
Cities	Venues	Capacity
Oran	Miloud Hadefi Complex Omnisport Arena	6,000

== Medal table ==
=== Total ===
Total of all categories for men and women.

Rank	Nation	Gold	Silver	Bronze	Total
1	Egypt	17	12	13	42
2	Algeria	13	18	11	42
3	Kuwait	6	2	0	8
4	Qatar	0	1	6	7
Totals (4 entries)		36	33	30	99
