= Saint-Benoît-la-Forêt =

- Commune
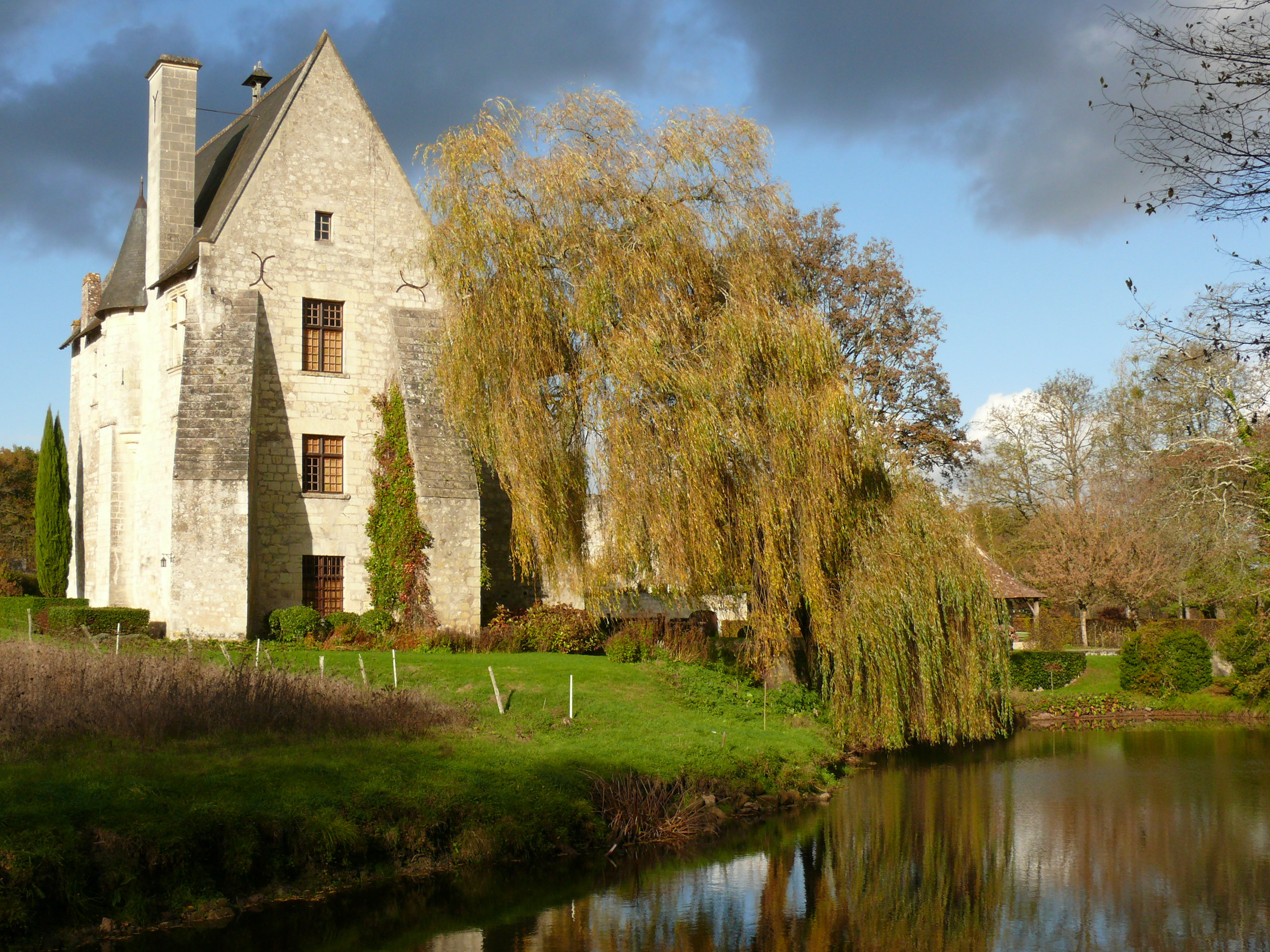
- Former Benedictine abbey
- Location of Saint-Benoît-la-Forêt
- Location within France Location within Centre-Val de Loire
- Coordinates: 47°13′18″N 0°19′23″E
- Country: France
- Region: Centre-Val de Loire
- Department: Indre-et-Loire
- Arrondissement: Chinon
- Canton: Chinon
- Intercommunality: Chinon, Vienne et Loire

Government
  - Mayor (2020–2026): Didier Guilbault
- Area^{1}: 35.25 km^{2} (13.61 sq mi)
- Highest elevation: 119 m (390 ft)
- Lowest elevation: 50 m (160 ft)
- Population (2023): 842
  - Density: 23.9/km^{2} (61.9/sq mi)
- Time zone: UTC+01:00 (CET)
  - Summer (DST): UTC+02:00 (CEST)
- INSEE/Postal code: 37210 /37500
- ^{1} French Land Register data, which excludes lakes, ponds, glaciers > 1 km^{2} (0.386 sq mi or 247 acres) and river estuaries.

Saint-Benoît-la-Forêt (French pronunciation: [sɛ̃ bənwa la fɔʁɛ]) is a commune in the Indre-et-Loire department in central France.

== Population ==
Historical population
Year	Pop.	±% p.a.
1968	334	—
1975	1,335	+21.89%
1982	1,177	−1.78%
1990	946	−2.69%
1999	766	−2.32%
2007	824	+0.92%
2012	888	+1.51%
2017	851	−0.85%
2023	842	−0.18%
Source: INSEE

== See also ==
- Communes of the Indre-et-Loire department
