= Artistic gymnastics at the 2026 Mediterranean Games – Men's parallel bars =

Men's parallel bars at the 2026 Mediterranean Games
- Venue: Grottaglie Sports Hall
- Date: 2 September 2026
- Competitors: 8 from 6 nations
- Winning total: 14.000

Medalists
gold medal	(Turkey) Altan Doğan
silver medal	(Cyprus) Marios Georgiou
bronze medal	(Italy) Matteo Levantesi

The Men's parallel bars competition at the 2026 Mediterranean Games was held on 2 September 2026 at the Grottaglie Sports Hall.

== Qualification ==
Rank	Gymnast	D Score	E Score	Pen.	Bon.	Total	Qual.
1	Matteo Levantesi (ITA)	5.1	8.900			14.000	Q
2	Altan Doğan (TUR)	5.3	8.550			13.850	Q
3	Nicolau Mir (ESP)	5.2	8.550		0.1	13.850	Q
4	Stefanos Tsolakidis (GRE)	5.2	8.400			13.600	Q
5	Mert Efe Kılıçer (TUR)	4.7	8.850			13.550	Q
6	Stefano Patron (ITA)	4.9	8.550			13.450	Q
7	Petar Vefić (SRB)	5.1	8.350			13.450	Q
8	Marios Georgiou (CYP)	5.2	8.150		0.1	13.450	Q
9	Thierno Diallo (ESP)	5.3	8.050			13.350	R1
10	Tommaso Brugnami (ITA)	4.6	8.600			13.200	–
11	Mohamed Afify (EGY)	5.3	7.850			13.150	R2
12	Ivan Brunello (ITA)	4.7	8.350			13.050	–
13	Hamza Hossaini (MAR)	4.8	8.200			13.000	R3

== Final ==
Rank	Gymnast	D Score	E Score	Pen.	Bon.	Total
1st place, gold medalist(s)	Altan Doğan (TUR)	5.3	8.700			14.000
2nd place, silver medalist(s)	Marios Georgiou (CYP)	5.4	8.600			14.000
3rd place, bronze medalist(s)	Matteo Levantesi (ITA)	5.1	8.800			13.900
4	Stefano Patron (ITA)	4.9	8.550			13.450
5	Mert Efe Kılıçer (TUR)	4.7	8.700			13.400
6	Petar Vefić (SRB)	5.1	8.200			13.300
7	Nicolau Mir (ESP)	5.2	7.650			12.850
8	Stefanos Tsolakidis (GRE)	4.7	6.500			11.200
