= Emma Fioravanti =

Italian artistic gymnast

- Born: 6 October 2009 (age 16) Milan, Lombardy

Gymnastics career
- Discipline: Women's artistic gymnastics
- Country represented: Italy (2022–present)
- Club: Ginnastica Milanese Forza e Coraggio
- Head coach: Tiziana Di Pilato
- Assistant coach: Paolo Bucci
Medal record
Representing Italy
European Championships
Gold medal – first place	2025 Leipzig	Team
Mediterranean Games
Gold medal – first place	2026 Taranto	Team
Bronze medal – third place	2026 Taranto	Floor exercise

Emma Fioravanti (born 6 October 2009) is an Italian artistic gymnast. She was a member of the gold medal winning team at the 2025 European Championships.

== Early life ==
Fioravanti was born in Milan in 2009.

== Gymnastics career ==
=== 2022–2024 ===
At the junior level Fioravanti competed at the City of Jesolo Trophy in 2022, 2023, and 2024. She won bronze in the all-around in 2023 and won gold on floor exercise in both 2023 and 2024. Fioravanti competed at the 2023 European Youth Olympic Festival where she helped Italy win gold as a team. Individually she won bronze in the all-around, tied with Ema Kandalova, and won silver on floor exercise behind Helen Kevric.

At the 2024 European Championships Fioravanti helped Italy win the silver behind France in the junior team competition. She placed fourth in the all-around and won silver on floor exercise behind compatriot Giulia Perotti.

=== 2025 ===
Fioravanti became age-eligible for senior level competition in 2025. She competed at the 2025 City of Jesolo Trophy where she placed seventh in the all-around but won gold with the Italian team. Additionally she won bronze on floor exercise behind Alba Petisco and Ana Bărbosu. She was selected to compete at the 2025 European Championships alongside Manila Esposito, Alice D'Amato, Sofia Tonelli, and Giulia Perotti. While there she helped Italy win gold as a team. Individually she qualified to the floor exercise final where she ultimately finished fifth.

== Competitive history ==
Competitive history of Emma Fioravanti at the junior level
Year	Event	Team	AA	VT	UB	BB	FX
2021	Tournoi International	2nd place, silver medalist(s)	2nd place, silver medalist(s)	1st place, gold medalist(s)	3rd place, bronze medalist(s)	2nd place, silver medalist(s)	1st place, gold medalist(s)
2022	City of Jesolo Trophy	3rd place, bronze medalist(s)	19				4
2022	Tournoi International	1st place, gold medalist(s)	4	4			7
2022	Italian Gold Championships		2nd place, silver medalist(s)	7	8	1st place, gold medalist(s)	1st place, gold medalist(s)
2023	City of Jesolo Trophy	1st place, gold medalist(s)	3rd place, bronze medalist(s)		5	6	1st place, gold medalist(s)
2023	European Youth Olympic Festival	1st place, gold medalist(s)	3rd place, bronze medalist(s)			4	2nd place, silver medalist(s)
2023	Italian Gold Championships		3rd place, bronze medalist(s)	5	2nd place, silver medalist(s)	4	6
2024	City of Jesolo Trophy	2nd place, silver medalist(s)	10				1st place, gold medalist(s)
2024	European Championships	2nd place, silver medalist(s)	4				2nd place, silver medalist(s)
2024	Italian Gold Championships		6	8		3rd place, bronze medalist(s)	3rd place, bronze medalist(s)

Competitive history of Emma Fioravanti at the senior level
Year	Event	Team	AA	VT	UB	BB	FX
2025	City of Jesolo Trophy	1st place, gold medalist(s)	7	5			3rd place, bronze medalist(s)
2025	European Championships	1st place, gold medalist(s)					5
2025	National Championships		3rd place, bronze medalist(s)				
2025	World Championships			18			60
2026	Cottbus World Cup					4	5
2026	City of Jesolo Trophy	5	17	5			
2026	Mediterranean Games	1st place, gold medalist(s)					3rd place, bronze medalist(s)
