= Christina Zwicker =

Croatian artistic gymnast (born 2002)

- Born: 17 September 2002 (age 23) Zagreb, Croatia
- Height: 163 cm (5 ft 4 in)

Gymnastics career
- Discipline: Women's artistic gymnastics
- Country represented: Croatia
- Club: ZTD Hrvatski Sokol
- Head coach: Marko Brez
Medal record
Women's artistic gymnastics
Representing Croatia
FIG World Cup
| Event | 1st | 2nd | 3rd |
|---|---|---|---|
| Apparatus World Cup | 0 | 0 | 1 |
| World Challenge Cup | 1 | 0 | 0 |
| Total | 1 | 0 | 1 |

Christina Zwicker (born 17 September 2002) is a Croatian artistic gymnast. She won a gold medal on the balance beam at the 2020 Szombathely World Challenge Cup and competed at the 2021 World Championships. She is the 2018 Croatian national all-around champion.

== Gymnastics career ==
Zwicker began gymnastics when she was four years old. She competed with the Croatian team that placed 24th at the 2016 Junior European Championships. She won a bronze medal in the junior all-around at the 2017 Salamunov Memorial.

Zwicker became age-eligible for senior international competitions in 2018. She won the senior all-around title at the 2018 Croatian Championships. She qualified for the floor exercise final at the 2018 Guimaraes World Challenge Cup, her first time qualifying for an international event final. She finished eighth in the final. Then at the Mersin World Challenge Cup, she finished eighth on the vault and sixth on the floor exercise. She competed at the European Championships in Glasgow but did not advance into any finals.

Zwicker won a bronze medal on the uneven bars at the 2019 Stella Zakharova Cup. She also won a bronze medal in the all-around at the 2019 Croatian Championships. She won a gold medal on the balance beam at the 2020 Szombathely World Challenge Cup, where she also placed eighth on the floor exercise. She then won a silver medal in the all-around at the 2020 Croatian Championships. At the 2020 European Championships, the Croatian team qualified for the team final and finished sixth. Zwicker qualified for the uneven bars and balance beam finals, finishing sixth and seventh, respectively.

Zwicker placed fifth on the balance beam at the 2021 Osijek World Challenge Cup. She then finished sixth on both the uneven bars and balance beam at the Mersin World Challenge Cup. She competed at the 2021 World Championships but fell off the uneven bars and balance beam and did not advance to any finals.

Zwicker competed at the 2023 Tel Aviv World Challenge Cup but did not advance into any event finals. She competed at the 2023 European Championships with the Croatian team that placed 24th. She then placed fifth on the balance beam at the Osijek World Challenge Cup.

Zwicker competed at the 2024 European Championships, finishing 28th with the Croatian team. She placed sixth on the balance beam at the 2025 Cottbus World Cup.

== Personal life ==
As of 2025, Zwicker is a student at the Zagreb School of Economics and Management, and she takes her courses in English.

== Competitive history ==
Competitive history of Christina Zwicker
| Year | Event | Team | AA | VT | UB | BB | FX |
Junior
| 2013 | Zelena Jama Open | | 36 | | | | |
| 2016 | Austrian Team Open | 11 | 33 | | | | |
| 2016 | Junior European Championships | 24 | | | | | |
| 2017 | Zelena Jama Open | | 9 | | | | |
| 2017 | Salamunov Memorial | | 3rd place, bronze medalist(s) | | 5 | 5 | 5 |
Senior
| 2018 | Croatian Championships | | 1st place, gold medalist(s) | | 1st place, gold medalist(s) | 1st place, gold medalist(s) | 2nd place, silver medalist(s) |
| 2018 | Guimaraes World Challenge Cup | | | | | | 8 |
| 2018 | Mersin World Challenge Cup | | | 8 | | | 6 |
| 2019 | Stella Zakharova Cup | | 5 | | 3rd place, bronze medalist(s) | 5 | |
| 2019 | Croatian Championships | | 3rd place, bronze medalist(s) | | 2nd place, silver medalist(s) | 3rd place, bronze medalist(s) | 2nd place, silver medalist(s) |
| 2020 | Szombathely World Challenge Cup | | | | | 1st place, gold medalist(s) | 8 |
| 2020 | Croatian Championships | | 2nd place, silver medalist(s) | 2nd place, silver medalist(s) | 1st place, gold medalist(s) | | 2nd place, silver medalist(s) |
| 2020 | European Championships | 6 | | | 6 | 7 | |
| 2021 | Osijek World Challenge Cup | | | | | 5 | |
| 2021 | Mersin World Challenge Cup | | | | 6 | 6 | |
| 2021 | World Championships | | 43 | | | | |
| 2023 | Elek Matolay Memorial | | 6 | | 8 | 5 | |
| 2023 | European Championships | 24 | | | | | |
| 2023 | Osijek World Challenge Cup | | | | | 5 | |
| 2024 | Unni & Haralds Trophy | | | | | 2nd place, silver medalist(s) | |
| 2024 | European Championships | 28 | | | | | |
| 2024 | Croatian Event Championships | | | | 3rd place, bronze medalist(s) | 5 | 2nd place, silver medalist(s) |
| 2025 | Cottbus World Cup | | | | | 6 | |
| 2025 | Doha World Cup | | | | | 3rd place, bronze medalist(s) | |
2026
| 2026 | European Championships | 32 | 52 | | | | |
| 2026 | Mediterranean Games | | 17 | | | | |
