= Athanasia Mesiri =

Greek artistic gymnast (born 2007)

- Αθανασία Μεσίρη
- Mesiri at the 2022 European Junior Championships

Personal information
- Nickname: Nasia
- Born: November 13, 2007 (age 18) Patras, Greece

Gymnastics career
- Country represented: Greece
- Club: Atlas Gymnastics
- Head coaches: Ilias Tsopanoglou; Mari Papadopoulou
- Eponymous skills: Uneven bars: From high bar — clear underswing with salto forward stretched
Medal record
Representing Greece
Women's artistic gymnastics
Mediterranean Games
Silver medal – second place	2026 Taranto	Vault

Athanasia Mesiri (Greek: Αθανασία Μεσίρη; born November 13, 2007) is a Greek artistic gymnast. She is the 2026 Mediterranean Games silver medalist on vault. Mesiri represented Greece at the 2023 and 2026 World Championships.

== Junior career ==
=== 2019-2022 ===
Mesiri's first accolades as a junior gymnast came at the 2019 Horizon Cup, where she won the bronze medal on vault as part of the Espoir division.

In 2021 and 2022, she was the Greek junior national vault champion. She also won the junior national title on floor in 2022, and won a medal in the all-around at both competitions. At the 2022 European Youth Olympic Festival, Mesiri finished 47th in the all-around and 20th on vault. Her final competition as a junior was the 2022 Junior European Championships, where she placed 22nd in the all-around and 15th on vault.

== Senior career ==
=== 2023 ===
In March of 2023, Mesiri was named to the Greek team for the 2023 European Championships in Antalya. At the competition, she placed 44th in the all-around and was the highest-ranked all-around athlete for Greece. Mesiri also qualified for and competed in the vault final. Though she tweaked her ankle on her first vault, she decided to continue and perform her second vault, ultimately placing seventh.

Later that year, Mesiri competed at the Szombathely World Challenge Cup. She placed fourth in the vault final, receiving the third-highest score but losing the bronze medal tiebreak to Pranati Nayak of India. She finished fifth in the floor final.

Based on her results at the European Championships, Mesiri qualified for the 2023 World Championships as an all-arounder. She placed 17th on vault, as well as 88th in the all-around.

=== 2024-2025 ===
Mesiri began 2024 by competing at the Cairo and Cottbus World Cups, performing on vault and floor exercise at each. She was second reserve for the vault final at the Cairo World Cup.

In May, Mesiri took part in her second senior European Championships. She placed 52nd in the all-around and 12th on vault. Later that month, she won four national titles at the Greek Championships, winning gold on vault, uneven bars, floor exercise, and in the all-around.

In 2025, Mesiri competed only at the Osijek World Cup in April. She performed routines on all four events, but did not advance to any finals.

=== 2026 ===
Mesiri returned to competition at the 2026 Osijek World Cup. In addition to qualifying for the vault final and placing sixth, she submitted a new eponymous uneven bars dismount, which was given a D (0.4) rating and added to the Code of Points. Her placement on vault also allowed her to qualify to the 2026 World Championships as an event specialist.

At the 2026 European Championships, Mesiri was third reserve for the vault final. She finished 88th in the all-around.

In August, Mesiri represented Greece at the 2026 Mediterranean Games, where she won her first major international medal, a silver in the vault final behind Benedetta Gava of Italy and ahead of Teja Belak of Slovenia. She also qualified for the all-around and floor finals, placing 15th and sixth, respectively. Greece finished seventh as a team.

Mesiri competed on vault at the 2026 World Championships, placing 13th on the event and improving her rank from her previous World Championships appearance in 2023.

== Eponymous skill ==
Apparatus	Name	Description	Difficulty (Note: Valid for the 2025–2028 Code of Points)	Added to the Code of Points
Uneven bars	Mesiri	From high bar — clear underswing with salto forward stretched	D (0.4)	2026 Osijek World Cup

== Competitive history ==
Competitive history of Athanasia Mesiri at the junior level
Year	Event	Team	AA	VT	UB	BB	FX
2019	Horizon Cup			3rd place, bronze medalist(s)			
2021	Greek Championships		2nd place, silver medalist(s)	1st place, gold medalist(s)			2nd place, silver medalist(s)
2022	Greek Championships		3rd place, bronze medalist(s)	1st place, gold medalist(s)			1st place, gold medalist(s)
2022	European Youth Olympic Festival						
2022	Junior European Championships		22				

Competitive history of Athanasia Mesiri at the senior level
Year	Event	Team	AA	VT	UB	BB	FX
2023
2023	European Championships			7			
2023	Szombathely World Challenge Cup			4			
2023	World Championships		88	17	144	87	93
2024	Cairo World Cup			R2			
2024	Cottbus World Cup						
2024	European Championships						
2024	Greek Championships		1st place, gold medalist(s)	1st place, gold medalist(s)	1st place, gold medalist(s)		1st place, gold medalist(s)
2025	Osijek World Cup						
2026	Osijek World Cup			6			
2026	Greek Championships			1st place, gold medalist(s)			2nd place, silver medalist(s)
2026	European Championships			R3			
2026	Mediterranean Games	7	15	2nd place, silver medalist(s)			6
2026	World Championships			13			
