= Djenna Laroui =

French artistic gymnast

- Laroui at the 2026 Paris World Cup

Personal information
- Born: 15 January 2005 (age 21) Lyon, France

Gymnastics career
- Discipline: Women's artistic gymnastics
- Country represented: Algeria; (2026–present)
- Former countries represented: France (2017–2025)
- Club: Pole Gym Saint-Etienne
- Head coaches: Monique and Eric Hagard
Medal record
Representing France
Women's artistic gymnastics
World Championships
| Bronze medal – third place | 2023 Antwerp | Team |
European Championships
| Bronze medal – third place | 2025 Leipzig | Team |
Mediterranean Games
| Silver medal – second place | 2022 Oran | Team |
FIG World Cup
Event / 1st / 2nd / 3rd; World Challenge Cup / 0 / 1 / 0
Representing Algeria
Women's artistic gymnastics
African Championships
| Gold medal – first place | 2026 Yaoundé | Team |
| Gold medal – first place | 2026 Yaoundé | Vault |
| Silver medal – second place | 2026 Yaoundé | Balance Beam |
| Bronze medal – third place | 2026 Yaoundé | All-around |
| Bronze medal – third place | 2026 Yaoundé | Uneven Bars |
Mediterranean Games
| Bronze medal – third place | 2026 Taranto | Team |

Djenna Laroui (born 15 January 2005) is a French-Algerian artistic gymnast who competes for Algeria in international competition and previously represented France until 2026. While representing France, she was the alternate for the team that won the bronze medal at the 2023 World Championships and was part of the medal winning teams at the 2022 Mediterranean Games (silver) and 2025 European Championships (bronze). She is the 2023 French national all-around champion.

== Gymnastics career ==
=== 2017–2025: Representing France ===
Laroui began gymnastics when she was six years old. She competed in the espoir division at the 2017 French Championships and finished fourth in the all-around. She then finished sixth in the all-around at the 2017 Elite Gym Massilia.

Laroui competed in the junior division for the first time in 2019 and finished 12th in the all-around at the French Championships. She then competed at the Top Gym Tournament in Charleroi, Belgium, and won a silver medal on the balance beam behind Russia's Elena Gerasimova.

Laroui became age-eligible for senior competitions in 2021. At the 2021 French Championships, she finished seventh in the all-around and fourth on the floor exercise. She was age-eligible for the 2020 Olympic team due to the year-long postponement of the Games, but she was not selected for the team.

Laroui competed with the French team that won a silver medal at the 2022 Mediterranean Games behind Italy. She finished eighth in the all-around at the 2022 French Championships and sixth on the vault.

Laroui won a bronze medal with the French team at the 2023 DTB Pokal Stuttgart. Individually, she qualified for the uneven bars and floor exercise finals, where she finished fifth and fourth, respectively. She was then selected to compete with the French team at the 2023 European Championships, and they finished sixth. She won her first senior international medal at the 2023 Varna World Challenge Cup by finishing second on the uneven bars to Zsófia Kovács. She then won the all-around title at the 2023 French Championships. At the Heidelberg Friendly, she helped the French team place third, and she placed third on the uneven bars. She competed on the uneven bars at the Paris World Challenge Cup and placed 12th in the qualification round. She was the team alternate for France at the 2023 World Championships, and they won the country's first World team medal since 1950.

Laroui won a bronze medal with the French team at the 2024 DTB Pokal Stuttgart, and she placed third in the all-around behind Georgia Godwin and Wu Ran. Then at the City of Jesolo Trophy, she helped the French team place fifth. She helped her Lyon club place fourth at the Top 12 Finals. She then won the all-around bronze medal at the French Championships, behind Mélanie de Jesus dos Santos and Morgane Osyssek. In the event finals, she won silver medals on the vault behind Ming van Eijken and on the balance beam behind de Jesus dos Santos. She won the all-around title at the Haguenau Friendly and helped the French team win the gold medal.

Laroui was selected to be the team alternate for the 2024 Summer Olympics. Five days before the Olympic Games began, she received a six-month ban for taking salbutamol without a therapeutic use exemption following a positive doping test at the French Championships. She began taking the medication through an inhaler after a respiratory infection earlier that year. The French Anti-Doping Agency reduced her suspension from two-years to six-months because she argued her doctors misguided her on the proper dosage.

At the 2025 European Championships, Laroui helped France win bronze as a team.

=== 2026–present: Representing Algeria ===
In April 2026, Laroui announced that she had decided to switch nationalities and represent Algeria in international competition. Laroui made her debut for Algeria at the 2026 African Championships where she helped Algeria win the team competition. Individually she won bronze in the all-around behind compatriot Kaylia Nemour and Caitlin Rooskrantz of South Africa.

== Competitive history ==
=== Representing France ===
Competitive history of Djenna Laroui at the espoir and junior level
| Year | Event | Team | AA | VT | UB | BB | FX |
|---|---|---|---|---|---|---|---|
| 2017 | Top 12 Championships | 11 | 35 | | | | |
| 2017 | French Championships | | 4 | 3rd place, bronze medalist(s) | | | 2nd place, silver medalist(s) |
| 2017 | Swiss Cup Juniors | 4 | 17 | | | | |
| 2017 | Elite Gym Massilia | | 6 | | | | 3rd place, bronze medalist(s) |
| 2018 | International Gymnix | | 29 | | | | |
| 2018 | Elite Gym Massilia | 8 | 21 | | | | |
| 2019 | French Championships | | 12 | | | | |
| 2019 | Elite Gym Massilia | | 8 | | | | |
| 2019 | Top Gym Tournament | 2nd place, silver medalist(s) | 5 | 7 | | 2nd place, silver medalist(s) | |
| 2020 | French Test Meet | | 5 | 2nd place, silver medalist(s) | 3rd place, bronze medalist(s) | | |
| 2020 | Coupe d’Hiver | 3rd place, bronze medalist(s) | 4 | | | | |

Competitive history of Djenna Laroui at the senior level
| Year | Event | Team | AA | VT | UB | BB | FX |
|---|---|---|---|---|---|---|---|
| 2021 | French Championships | | 7 | | | | 4 |
| 2022 | Mediterranean Games | 2nd place, silver medalist(s) | | | | | |
| 2022 | French Championships | | 8 | 6 | | | |
| 2023 | DTB Pokal Stuttgart | 3rd place, bronze medalist(s) | | | 5 | | 4 |
| 2023 | European Championships | 6 | | | | | |
| 2023 | Varna World Challenge Cup | | | | 2nd place, silver medalist(s) | | |
| 2023 | French Championships | | 1st place, gold medalist(s) | 3rd place, bronze medalist(s) | 5 | | 3rd place, bronze medalist(s) |
| 2023 | Heidelberg Friendly | 3rd place, bronze medalist(s) | 9 | | 3rd place, bronze medalist(s) | | |
| 2023 | World Championships | (bronze) (Note: Laroui received a medal as the team's alternate) | | | | | |
| 2024 | DTB Pokal Stuttgart | 3rd place, bronze medalist(s) | 3rd place, bronze medalist(s) | | | | |
| 2024 | City of Jesolo Trophy | 5 | 22 | | | | |
| 2024 | Top 12 Finals | 4 | 2nd place, silver medalist(s) | | | 3rd place, bronze medalist(s) | |
| 2024 | French Championships | | 3rd place, bronze medalist(s) | 2nd place, silver medalist(s) | 5 | 2nd place, silver medalist(s) | 6 |
| 2024 | Haguenau Friendly | 1st place, gold medalist(s) | 1st place, gold medalist(s) | 1st place, gold medalist(s) | 2nd place, silver medalist(s) | | |
2025
| 2025 | European Championships | 3rd place, bronze medalist(s) | | | | | |

=== Representing Algeria ===
Competitive history of Djenna Laroui at the senior level
| Year | Event | Team | AA | VT | UB | BB | FX |
2026
| 2026 | African Championships | 1st place, gold medalist(s) | 3rd place, bronze medalist(s) | 1st place, gold medalist(s) | 3rd place, bronze medalist(s) | 2nd place, silver medalist(s) | |
| 2026 | Mediterranean Games | 3rd place, bronze medalist(s) | 7 | | | | |
| 2026 | World Championships | 20 | | | | | |
