= Kaylia Nemour =

Algerian artistic gymnast (born 2006)

- كيليا نمور; ⴽⴰⵢⵍⵉⴰ ⵏⴻⵎoⵓⵔ
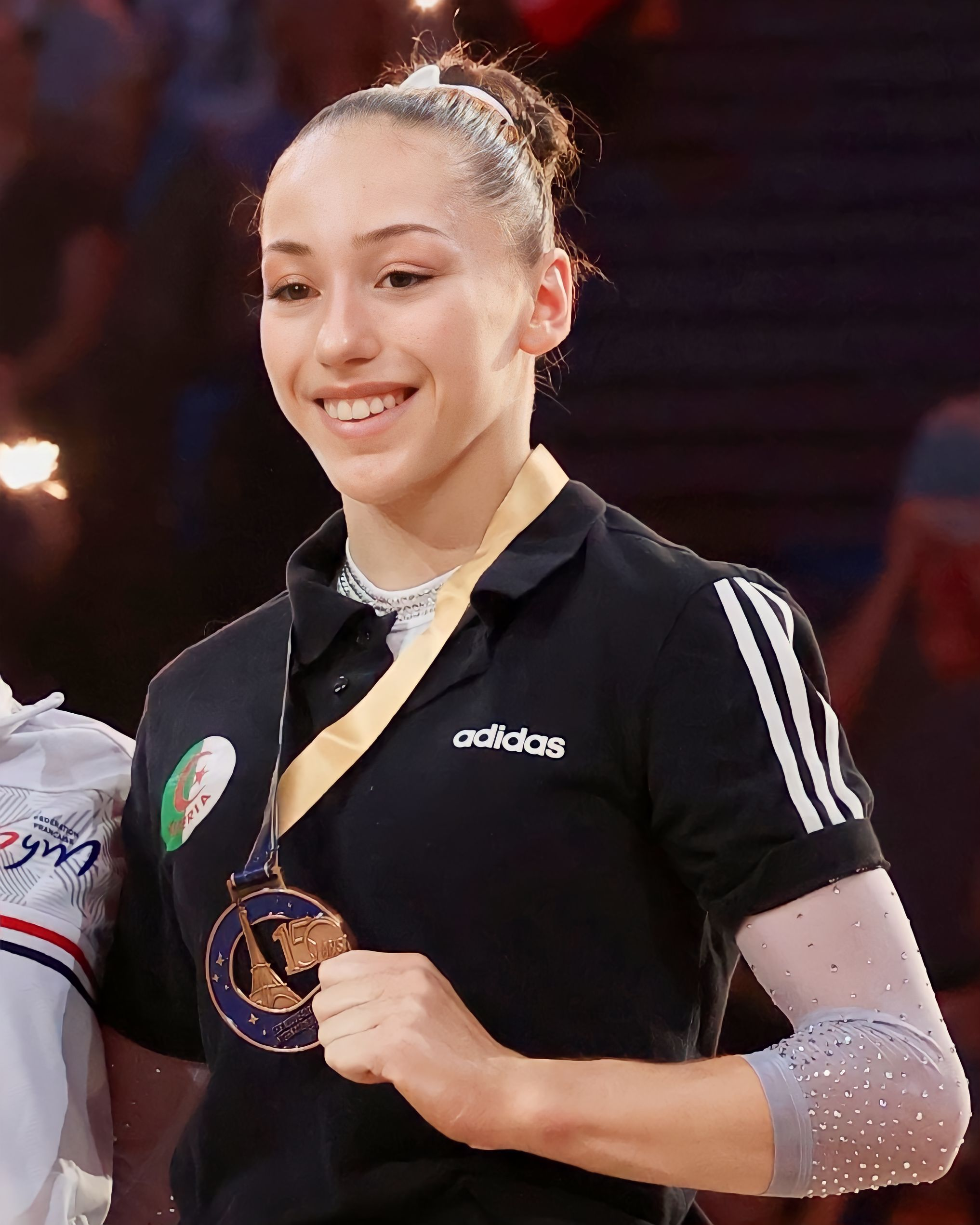
- Nemour at the 2023 Paris World Challenge Cup

Personal information
- Born: 30 December 2006 (age 19) Saint-Benoît-la-Forêt, France

Gymnastics career
- Discipline: Women's artistic gymnastics
- Country represented: Algeria; (2022–present)
- Former countries represented: France (2017–2021)
- Club: Alliance Dijon Gym 21 (2025-)
- Head coach: Nadia Massé
Medal record
Representing Algeria
Women's artistic gymnastics
Event	1st	2nd	3rd
Olympic Games	1	0	0
World Championships	3	2	0
African Championships	6	0	1
Mediterranean Games	3	0	1
Total	13	2	2
Olympic Games
Gold medal – first place	2024 Paris	Uneven bars
World Championships
Gold medal – first place	2025 Jakarta	Uneven bars
Gold medal – first place	2026 Rotterdam	Uneven bars
Gold medal – first place	2026 Rotterdam	Balance beam
Silver medal – second place	2023 Antwerp	Uneven bars
Silver medal – second place	2025 Jakarta	Balance beam
Mediterranean Games
Gold medal – first place	2026 Taranto	All-around
Gold medal – first place	2026 Taranto	Uneven bars
Gold medal – first place	2026 Taranto	Balance Beam
Bronze medal – third place	2026 Taranto	Team
African Championships
Gold medal – first place	2023 Pretoria	All-around
Gold medal – first place	2026 Yaoundé	Team
Gold medal – first place	2026 Yaoundé	All-around
Gold medal – first place	2026 Yaoundé	Uneven bars
Gold medal – first place	2026 Yaoundé	Balance Beam
Gold medal – first place	2026 Yaoundé	Floor Exercise
Bronze medal – third place	2023 Pretoria	Team
FIG World Cup
Event	1st	2nd	3rd
World Cup	9	4	1
World Challenge Cup	3	1	1
Total	12	5	2

Kaylia Nemour (Arabic: كيليا نمور, romanized: Kailiya Numur; born 30 December 2006) is an Algerian artistic gymnast. The most successful African gymnast of all time, she is the first gymnast representing any African nation to win an Olympic medal and a World medal.

On the uneven bars, she is the 2024 Olympic champion, a two-time World champion (2025, 2026) and World silver medalist (2023), and the 2026 Mediterranean Games and African champion; her routine is considered by many to be the most difficult of all time. On balance beam, she is the 2026 World, Mediterranean Games, and African champion and the 2025 World silver medalist. In the all-around, she is a two-time African champion (2023, 2026), the 2026 Mediterranean Games champion, and has placed in the top five at the Olympic Games (2024) and the World Championships (2025, 2026).

== Early life ==
Nemour was born in Saint-Benoît-la-Forêt, France, to a French mother and an Algerian father. Her father's parents were from Jijel Province, Beni Meslem tribe, Algeria, making Kaylia and her father dual nationals.

== Gymnastics career ==
=== Early career ===
She began gymnastics when she was four years old. Nemour made her international debut at the 2017 Tournoi International where she placed 16th in the all-around in the espoir division. She competed on all four events at the Top 12 Series 2, helping her club win its matchup against Lyon.

Nemour's first event of 2018 was the Top 12 Series 3. She contributed on uneven bars, balance beam, and floor exercise toward Avoine's win over Rouen. Then at Series 4, she competed on the uneven bars and helped her club win against Haguenau. At the Top 12 Final she competed on uneven bars and floor exercise, helping Avoine win the silver medal overall. At the 2018 French Championships, she finished seventh all-around in the espoir division.

=== Junior gymnastics career ===
==== 2019 ====
Nemour competed on vault, balance beam, and floor exercise at the 2019 Top 12 Finals, helping Avoine finish second. At the French Championships, she won the all-around for her age division; additionally, she scored the highest on floor exercise and uneven bars, and third highest on vault. In September, she competed at the Mediterranean Championships where she helped France finish third as a team. Individually, Nemour placed first in the all-around, on uneven bars, and on balance beam, fourth on vault, and fifth on floor exercise.

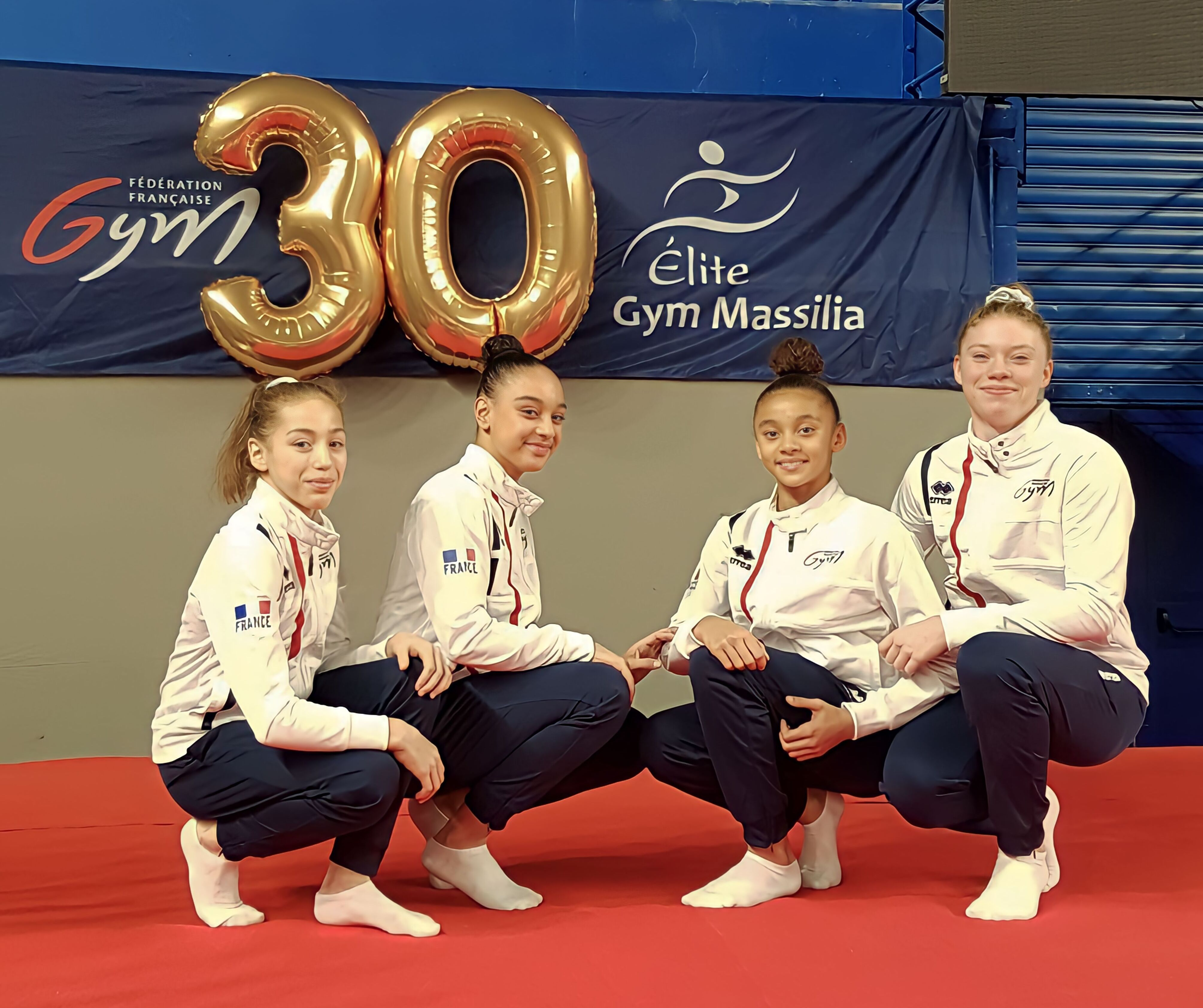
Nemour (left) representing France at the 2019 Élite Gym Massilia

Nemour competed at the Swiss Cup Juniors where she helped France finish second as a team. Individually, she won silver in the all-around behind Ana Bărbosu. Then at the Elite Gym Massilia, she placed fifth in the all-around. In the event finals, she won the gold medal on the uneven bars and bronze on the floor exercise behind Viktoria Listunova and Jennifer Gadirova. She helped Avoine win its matchup against Colomiers at the Top 12 Series 2.

==== 2020–21 ====
In February 2020, Nemour competed on all four events at the Top 12 Series 3, helping Avoine win its matchup against Combs la Ville. Most competitions were canceled or postponed in 2020 due to the global COVID-19 pandemic. She returned to competition in October at the French Test Meet, winning the junior all-around title by over three points. She competed at the Coupe d’Hiver as part of the Blue Team, in which they finished first. Additionally, Nemour finished first in the all-around.

In 2021, Nemour competed at the Top 12 Championships. She had the highest scores of the competition on the three events she competed, and she helped Avoine win the title. She then competed at the French Championships. She only competed on the uneven bars but won the title ahead of the senior competitors. Nemour had to undergo two surgeries on her knees after developing osteochondritis.

=== Senior gymnastics career ===
==== 2022 ====
Nemour became age-eligible for senior international competition in 2022. Although her personal doctor cleared her to resume training after the knee surgeries, the French national team doctor was unwilling to do so. The French Gymnastics Federation also wanted Nemour to leave her club and train in Paris under their supervision, but Nemour did not want to. As a result, Nemour opted to change her nationality to represent Algeria. In July, the International Gymnastics Federation approved the nationality change; however, because the French Gymnastics Federation blocked the request, Nemour would not be able to represent Algeria in FIG-sanctioned competitions (such as World Championships or African Championships) until July 2023.

In October, Nemour made her debut for Algeria at the Arab Championships, which is not an FIG-sanctioned event. While there, she helped Algeria win gold in the team competition. Individually, she won gold on the uneven bars and silver on balance beam behind Jana Abdelsalam.

==== 2023 ====
Nemour was able to compete at the French domestic events at the beginning of the season. She helped Avoine win its matchups at the Top 12 Series 2, 3, and 4. At the Top 12 Finals, she scored 15.350 on the uneven bars, the highest score of the entire competition, to help Avoine win the championship.

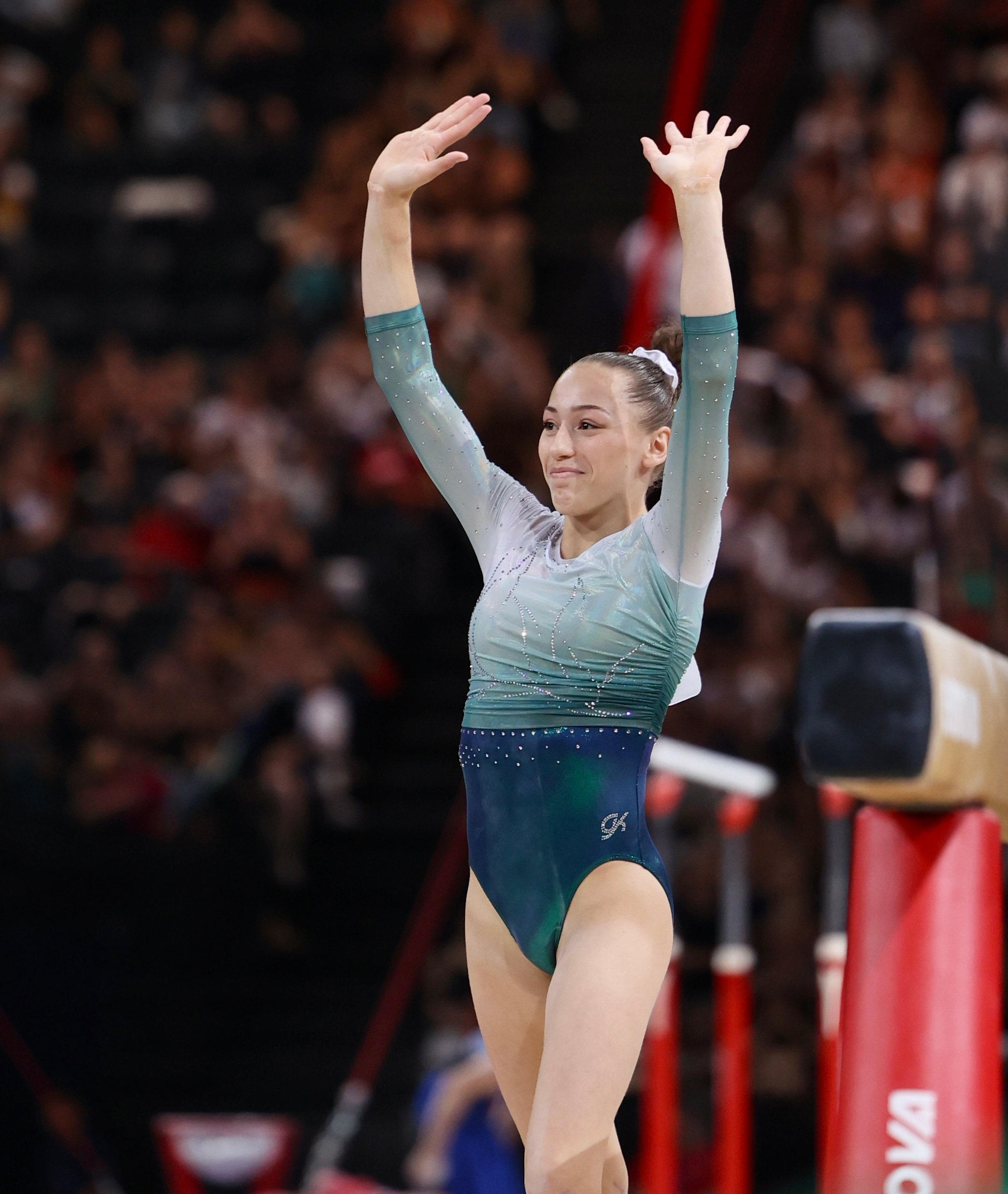
Nemour at the 2023 Paris World Challenge Cup

In early 2023, an online petition began circulating, pressuring the French Gymnastics Federation to release Nemour and allow her to compete at the upcoming African Championships, which served as a qualifying event for the 2023 World Championships. In May, Thierry Vildary, a French sports journalist, released a report documenting the French Gymnastics Federation's abuse of other gymnasts. A result of the report was that the federation released Nemour, which allowed her to compete at the African Championships two weeks later.

At the African Championships, Nemour helped Algeria finish third as a team. Individually, she won the all-around ahead of reigning African champion Caitlin Rooskrantz and Jana Abdelsalam. In doing so, Nemour earned an individual berth to compete at the World Championships later in the year. In September, Nemour competed at the Paris World Challenge Cup, where she took the silver medal on the balance beam as well as bronze on the uneven bars.

At the World Championships in Antwerp, Nemour qualified for the uneven bars final in third with a score of 14.733 and the individual all-around final with a total score of 53.699. These placements made her the first Algerian gymnast to qualify for a World Championship final. Furthermore, by finishing in 13th place in the all-around during the qualification round, Nemour qualified as an individual to compete at the 2024 Olympic Games in Paris. In the all-around final, she placed eighth, the highest placement for any gymnast representing an African nation, highlighted by a 15.200 on the uneven bars. In the event final, she scored 15.066, less than a tenth behind Qiu Qiyuan of China and earning the silver medal, the first World Championship medal received by an African gymnast.

After the World Championships, Nemour competed at the Arthur Gander Memorial and won the bronze medal in the all-around behind Júlia Soares and Mélanie de Jesus dos Santos.

==== 2024 ====
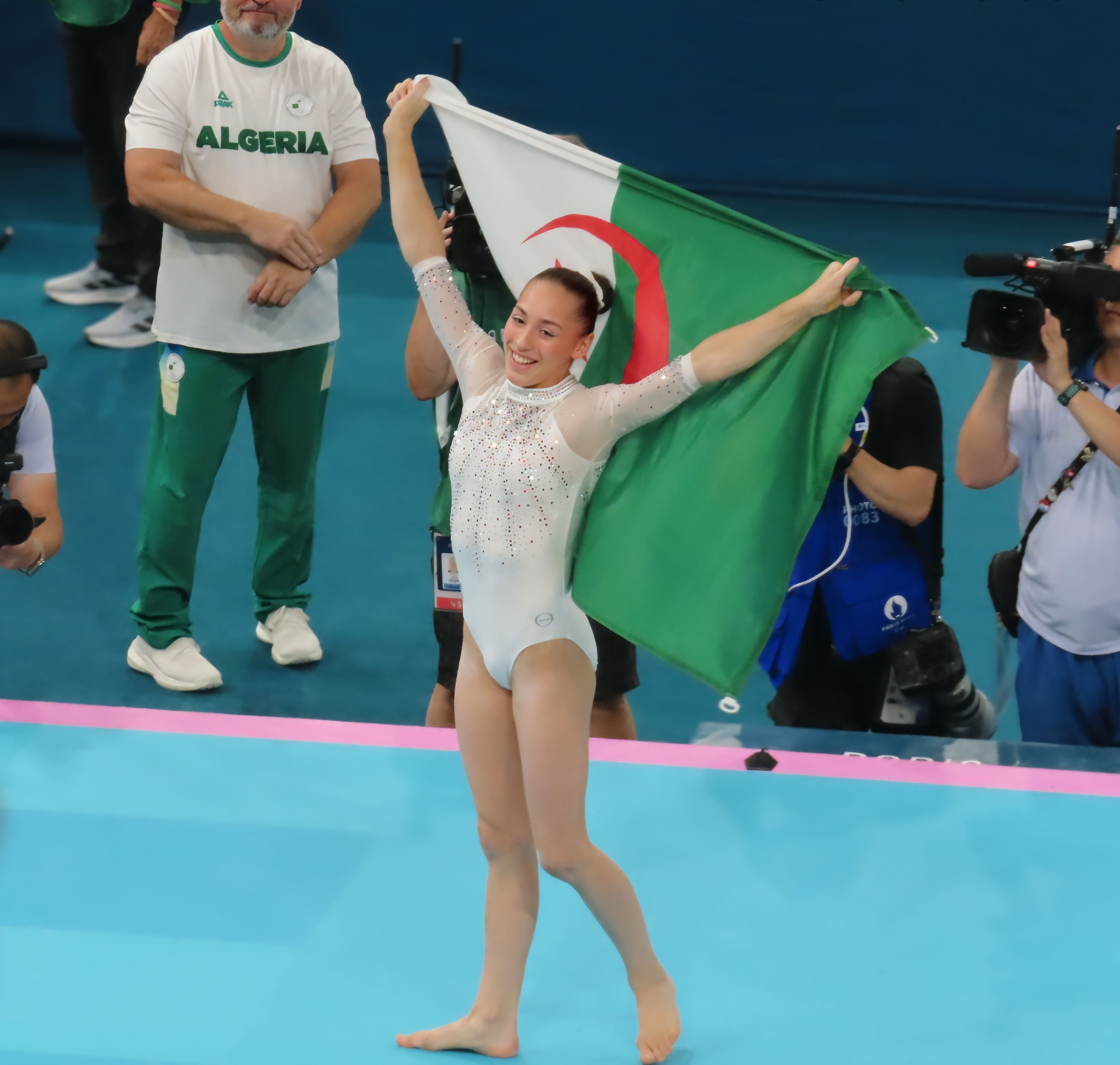
Nemour at the 2024 Olympics

Nemour began the year competing at the World Cups in Cottbus, Baku, and Doha. She won gold on the uneven bars at all three competitions. At Baku, she also scored a bronze on floor exercise, and at Doha, she won silver on balance beam and gold on floor exercise.

Despite nursing an ankle injury, at the Olympic Games, Nemour qualified for the uneven bars final in first place, as well as the all-around final. During the all-around final, Nemour scored a 55.899 and finished fifth in the competition, the highest placement for an African gymnast in an Olympic all-around final. During the uneven bars final, Nemour earned a score 15.700 to win the gold medal ahead of Qiu Qiyuan and Sunisa Lee. In doing so, Nemour became the first gymnast from the African continent to win an Olympic gold medal in gymnastics, as well as an Olympic medal of any color in gymnastics.

==== 2025 ====
Nemour returned to competition at the International Gymnix competition in Montreal; she won gold in the all-around and on uneven bars and balance beam and placed seventh on floor exercise. In late April, Nemour competed at the Cairo World Cup; she won gold on uneven bars and balance beam and won silver on floor exercise behind Jana Mahmoud of Egypt.

In May, it was revealed that Nemour was leaving her longtime club Avoine-Beaumont. Nemour later alleged that her former coaches were verbally abusive from when she was a young age and that she "cried every day", but that she and her family had been told that it was expected of high-level gymnastics training. She also alleged that her coaches dismissed her when she said she was in pain and that she experienced abusive weight management.

At the 2025 World Championships Nemour qualified to the all-around, uneven bars, and balance beam finals despite falling off the latter. During the all-around final, Nemour incurred a 0.3 point deduction on vault for stepping out of bounds on her landing and fell off of the balance beam. As a result, she finished fourth, 0.069 points behind bronze medalist Zhang Qingying and only 0.502 points behind gold medalist Angelina Melnikova. During the uneven bars final, Nemour won the gold medal with a score of 15.566, 1.066 points ahead of silver medalist Melnikova. In doing so, Nemour became the first gymnast from Africa to become a World Champion. During the balance beam final, Nemour won the silver medal behind Zhang.

In December, she released a book, L'ombre de l'or (English: The shadow of gold), about her experience in gymnastics.

==== 2026 ====
Nemour competing on the balance beam at the 2026 World Championships

Nemour competed at the Cottbus, Baku, and Cairo World Cups across the spring of 2026, competing on uneven bars and balance beam at each. She won balance beam silver at Cottbus, uneven bars gold and balance beam silver at Baku, and gold medals on both events at the Cairo World Cup. In April, she won five gold medals at the African Championships, including all-around gold and gold with the Algerian team.

In September, Nemour represented Algeria at the 2026 Mediterranean Games. She won the gold medal in the all-around, as well as on uneven bars and balance beam. She also contributed to Algeria's bronze-medal finish as a team.

In October, Nemour competed at the 2026 World Championships in Rotterdam. She qualified to the all-around final in first place and additionally qualified to the uneven bars and balance beam finals. During the all-around final, a mistimed round-off almost caused her to miss the springboard on vault; due to this she only competed a Yurchenko layout instead of her intended double twisting Yurchenko, losing 1.4 in difficulty. As a result she finished fourth overall. During event finals she won gold on both the uneven bars and balance beam, making her the only gymnast at the competition to win two individual titles.

== Eponymous skill ==
Nemour has an uneven bars release named after her in the Code of Points. The release is commonly called the "inbar Nabieva," and she first performed it at the 2023 African Championships.

Apparatus	Name	Description	Difficulty (Note: Valid for the 2025–2028 Code of Points)	Added to the Code of Points
Uneven bars	Nemour	Inbar to counter reversed laid out hecht over high bar	G (0.7)	2023 African Championships

== Competitive history ==
Nemour with her medals

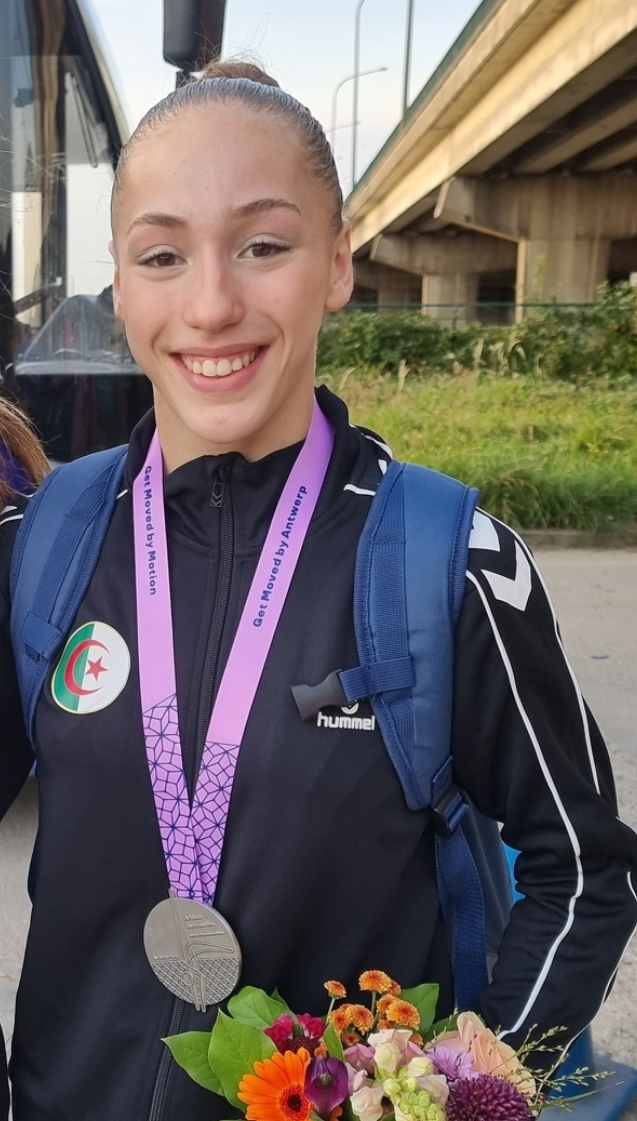
2023 World Championships (silver)

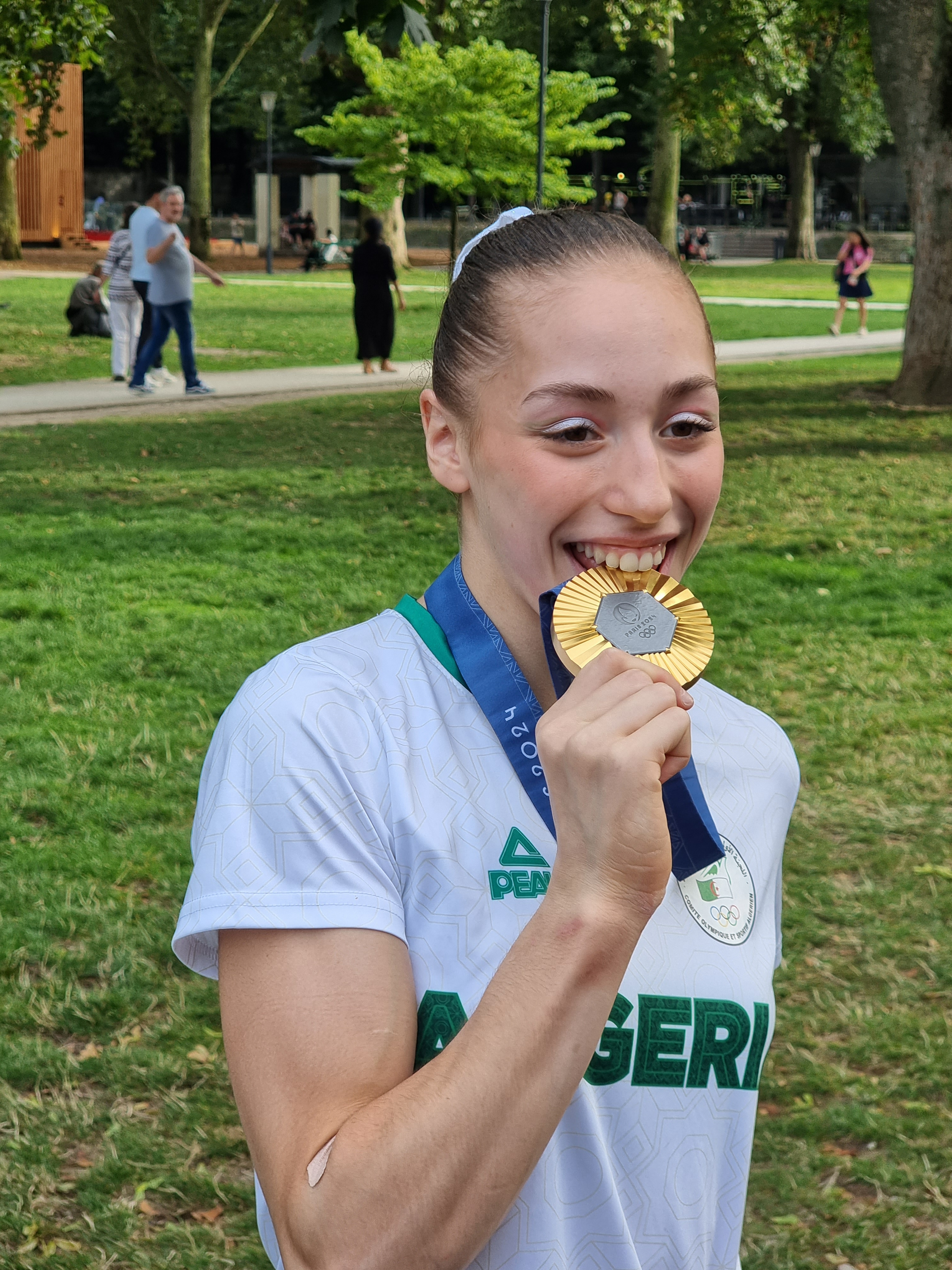
2024 Olympic Games (gold)

=== Representing France ===
Competitive history of Kaylia Nemour at the espoir level
Year	Event	Team	AA	VT	UB	BB	FX
2017	Tournoi International	5	16				
2017	Top 12 Series 2	1st place, gold medalist(s)					
2017	French Elite Championships		2nd place, silver medalist(s)				
2018	Top 12 Series 3	1st place, gold medalist(s)					
2018	Top 12 Series 3	1st place, gold medalist(s)					
2018	Top 12 Final	2nd place, silver medalist(s)					
2018	French Elite Championships		7				

Competitive history of Kaylia Nemour at the junior level
Year	Event	Team	AA	VT	UB	BB	FX
2019	Top 12 Final	2nd place, silver medalist(s)					
2019	French Elite Championships		1st place, gold medalist(s)	3rd place, bronze medalist(s)	1st place, gold medalist(s)	5	1st place, gold medalist(s)
2019	Mediterranean Championships	3rd place, bronze medalist(s)	1st place, gold medalist(s)	4	1st place, gold medalist(s)	1st place, gold medalist(s)	5
2019	Swiss Cup Juniors	2nd place, silver medalist(s)	2nd place, silver medalist(s)				
2019	Elite Gym Massilia		5		1st place, gold medalist(s)		3rd place, bronze medalist(s)
2019	Top 12 Series 2	1st place, gold medalist(s)					
2020	Top 12 Series 3	1st place, gold medalist(s)					
2020	French Test Meet		1st place, gold medalist(s)		1st place, gold medalist(s)	2nd place, silver medalist(s)	1st place, gold medalist(s)
2020	Coupe d’Hiver	1st place, gold medalist(s)	1st place, gold medalist(s)				
2021	Top 12 Championships	1st place, gold medalist(s)					
2021	French Elite Championships				1st place, gold medalist(s)		

=== Representing Algeria ===
Competitive history of Kaylia Nemour at the senior level
Year	Event	Team	AA	VT	UB	BB	FX
2022	Arab Championships	1st place, gold medalist(s)			1st place, gold medalist(s)	2nd place, silver medalist(s)	
2023	Top 12 Series 2	1st place, gold medalist(s)					
2023	Top 12 Series 3	1st place, gold medalist(s)					
2023	Top 12 Series 4	1st place, gold medalist(s)					
2023	Top 12 Finals	1st place, gold medalist(s)					
2023	African Championships	3rd place, bronze medalist(s)	1st place, gold medalist(s)				
2023	Paris World Challenge Cup				3rd place, bronze medalist(s)	2nd place, silver medalist(s)	
2023	World Championships		8		2nd place, silver medalist(s)		
2023	Arthur Gander Memorial		3rd place, bronze medalist(s)				
2024	Cottbus World Cup				1st place, gold medalist(s)	4	6
2024	Baku World Cup				1st place, gold medalist(s)	4	3rd place, bronze medalist(s)
2024	Doha World Cup				1st place, gold medalist(s)	2nd place, silver medalist(s)	1st place, gold medalist(s)
2024	RomGym Trophy		1st place, gold medalist(s)		1st place, gold medalist(s)	1st place, gold medalist(s)	1st place, gold medalist(s)
2024	Olympic Games		5		1st place, gold medalist(s)		
2024	Arthur Gander Memorial		1st place, gold medalist(s)				
2024	Swiss Cup	2nd place, silver medalist(s)					
2024	Top 12 Series 1	1st place, gold medalist(s)					
2024	Top 12 Series 2	1st place, gold medalist(s)					
2025	Prima Prova Serie A1	3rd place, bronze medalist(s)					
2025	International Gymnix		1st place, gold medalist(s)		1st place, gold medalist(s)	1st place, gold medalist(s)	7
2025	Top 12 Series 4	1st place, gold medalist(s)					
2025	Top 12 Finals	1st place, gold medalist(s)					
2025	Cairo World Cup				1st place, gold medalist(s)	1st place, gold medalist(s)	2nd place, silver medalist(s)
2025	Final 8 Serie A1	2nd place, silver medalist(s)					
2025	Tashkent World Challenge Cup				1st place, gold medalist(s)	1st place, gold medalist(s)	
2025	Paris World Challenge Cup				1st place, gold medalist(s)		
2025	World Championships		4		1st place, gold medalist(s)	2nd place, silver medalist(s)	
2026	Cottbus World Cup				7	2nd place, silver medalist(s)	
2026	Baku World Cup				1st place, gold medalist(s)	2nd place, silver medalist(s)	
2026	Cairo World Cup				1st place, gold medalist(s)	1st place, gold medalist(s)	
2026	African Championships	1st place, gold medalist(s)	1st place, gold medalist(s)		1st place, gold medalist(s)	1st place, gold medalist(s)	1st place, gold medalist(s)
2026	Mediterranean Games	3rd place, bronze medalist(s)	1st place, gold medalist(s)		1st place, gold medalist(s)	1st place, gold medalist(s)	7
2026	World Championships	20	4		1st place, gold medalist(s)	1st place, gold medalist(s)	

== Awards ==
- Fatima Bint Mubarak Women Sports Awards: Best Arab Women Athlete 2024
- Ahid of the National Order of Merit (Algeria)

== See also ==
- Nationality changes in gymnastics
