= Marina Escudero =

Spanish artistic gymnast (born 2008)

- Escudero at the 2026 American Cup

Personal information
- Full name: Marina Escudero Cabacas
- Born: November 7, 2008 (age 17) Sant Cugat del Vallès, Spain

Gymnastics career
- Discipline: Women's artistic gymnastics
- Country represented: Spain
- Club: CGA L'Hospitalet
- Head coaches: Xenia Alcauzar; Nani Gordillo
Medal record
Women's artistic gymnastics
Representing Spain
Mediterranean Games
Silver medal – second place	2026 Taranto	Team

Marina Escudero Cabacas (born November 7, 2008) is a Spanish artistic gymnast. She was part of the silver medal-winning team at the 2026 Mediterranean Games. Escudero represented Spain at the 2025 World and 2023 Junior World Championships.

== Junior career ==
=== 2023 ===
Escudero made her international debut at the 2023 DTB Pokal Team Challenge. The Spanish junior women's team finished seventh, and Escudero placed 20th in the all-around.

With teammates Leire Escauriaza and Claudia Torrent, Escudero represented Spain at the 2023 Junior World Championships. She placed 40th in the all-around, and her best individual event result was 28th on uneven bars. The Spanish team finished 12th.

In July, Escudero became the Spanish Junior National Vault Champion. She also won silver on floor, bronze on uneven bars, and bronze in the all-around at the Spanish Championships.

Escudero's final international competition at the junior level was the European Youth Olympic Festival. Her best result was 26th on uneven bars, and Spain finished 17th as a team.

== Senior career ==
=== 2024 ===
At the 2024 DTB Pokal Team Challenge, Escudero's first international competition as a senior athlete, the Spanish team placed sixth. The following month, she competed at the City of Jesolo Trophy. Spain finished ninth as a team, and Escudero finished 32nd in the all-around.

Escudero was named to the Spanish team for the 2024 European Championships. She contributed to Spain's fifth-place finish in the team final. At the National Championships the following month, Escudero placed eighth in the all-around.

=== 2025 ===
Escudero once again competed at the DTB Pokal Challenge, where the Spanish team won the gold medal. Escudero also placed fifth in the all-around and qualified for the balance beam final, ultimately placing fourth. She also qualified for the balance beam final at the 2025 City of Jesolo Trophy, finishing in seventh place, in addition to 15th in the all-around and fourth with the Spanish team.

In May, Escudero competed at her second European Championships. Spain placed ninth during the qualification round. At the Spanish Championships a month later, she won the bronze medal on vault and came in sixth in the all-around.

Escudero participated took part in two FIG World Challenge Cups in 2025. Though she did not qualify for any finals at the Paris World Cup, she reached the vault final at the Szombathely World Cup, placing seventh.

Along with teammates Alba Petisco and Laia Font, Escudero represented Spain at the 2025 World Championships. Although she placed 22nd during qualification, she was ineligible for the all-around final as Petisco and Font finished ahead of her.

=== 2026 ===
Escudero competing at the 2026 American Cup

In March 2026, Escudero competed at the 2026 American Cup in Las Vegas, with Alba Petisco, Nicolau Mir, and Joel Plata as fellow members of Team Spain. She contributed scores on uneven bars, balance beam, and floor exercise toward Spain's fourth-place finish. Escudero competed at the City of Jesolo Trophy later that month, where she placed 24th in the all-around and sixth with the Spanish team.

At the Spanish Championships in June, Escudero won her first senior national title on balance beam, in addition to winning the bronze medal in the all-around.

Escudero competed at the 2026 European Championships, and Spain qualified for the team final, placing sixth. Individually, she placed 15th in the all-around. A few weeks later, Escudero won a silver medal in the team competition at the 2026 Mediterranean Games, with Spain finishing behind Italy and ahead of Algeria. She also qualified for the vault and floor finals, placing sixth and fourth, respectively.

On September 30, Escudero was named to the Spanish team for the 2026 World Championships with teammates Alba Petisco, Laia Font, Aitana Pacheco, Carlota Armenta, and Laura Casabuena.

== Competitive history ==
Competitive history of Marina Escudero at the junior level
Year	Event	Team	AA	VT	UB	BB	FX
2023	DTB Pokal Team Challenge	7	20				
2023	Junior World Championships	12	40		28	68	51
2023	Spanish Championships		3rd place, bronze medalist(s)	1st place, gold medalist(s)	3rd place, bronze medalist(s)		2nd place, silver medalist(s)
2023	European Youth Olympic Festival	17					

Competitive history of Marina Escudero at the senior level
Year	Event	Team	AA	VT	UB	BB	FX
2024	DTB Pokal Team Challenge	6					
2024	City of Jesolo Trophy	9	32				
2024	European Championships	5					
2024	Spanish Championships		8				
2025	DTB Pokal Team Challenge	1st place, gold medalist(s)	5			4	
2025	City of Jesolo Trophy	4	15			7	
2025	European Championships	9					
2025	Spanish Championships		6	3rd place, bronze medalist(s)			
2025	Paris World Challenge Cup						
2025	Szombathely World Challenge Cup			7			
2025	World Championships	—N/a			44	53	31
2026	American Cup	4					
2026	City of Jesolo Trophy	6	24				
2026	Spanish Championships		3rd place, bronze medalist(s)			1st place, gold medalist(s)	
2026	European Championships	6	15				
2026	Mediterranean Games	2nd place, silver medalist(s)		6			4
2026	World Championships						
