= Lucija Hribar =

Slovene artistic gymnast

- Born: 15 October 2001 (age 24) Ljubljana, Slovenia

Gymnastics career
- Discipline: Women's artistic gymnastics
- Country represented: Slovenia (2013–present)
- Club: GD Zelena Jama
- Head coach: Nataša Retelj
Medal record
Artistic gymnastics
Representing Slovenia
Mediterranean Games
Bronze medal – third place	2018 Tarragona	Uneven bars
FIG World Cup
Event	1st	2nd	3rd
Apparatus World Cup	0	3	2
World Challenge Cup	2	1	3
Total	2	4	5

Lucija Hribar (born 15 October 2001) is a Slovenian artistic gymnast. She is the 2018 Mediterranean Games uneven bars bronze medalist and a three-time bronze medalist on the FIG World Challenge Cup series. She represented Slovenia at the 2024 Summer Olympics.

== Early life ==
Hribar was born in Ljubljana, Slovenia, on 15 October 2001. She has two younger brothers, including Anže (b. 2004) who represents Slovenia in men's artistic gymnastics.

== Junior gymnastics career ==
Hribar made her international debut at the 2013 Zelena Jama Open and finished fifth in the all-around. Then at the 2013 Leverkusen Cup, she finished 18th in the all-around and sixth with her club team. She competed with the Italian club Artistica 81 as a guest at the 2014 1st Italian Serie A, helping them place seventh.

Hribar finished 19th with the Slovenian team at the 2015 European Youth Olympic Festival. She finished 13th in the all-around at the 2015 Olympic Hopes Cup in Liberec, Czech Republic. She finished sixth in the vault final at the 2016 City of Jesolo Trophy. At the 2016 Junior European Championships, Hriber and the Slovenian team finished 21st.

== Senior gymnastics career ==
=== 2017 ===
Hribar became age-eligible for senior international competitions in 2017. She made her senior debut at the 2017 European Championships but did not advance to any finals. She finished fourth on uneven bars and eighth on floor exercise at the Varna World Challenge Cup. At the World Championships, she finished 40th all-around in the qualification round. She then helped her club finished sixth at the Leverkusen Cup.

=== 2018 ===
Hribar began the season at the Baku World Cup where she finished sixth on uneven bars. She won the all-around gold medal at the Slovenian Cup. Then at the Koper World Challenge Cup, she finished seventh on the uneven bars. She competed with Teja Belak, Judita Zabukovec, Tjaša Kysselef, and Adela Šajn at the 2018 Mediterranean Games, and they placed sixth in the team final. Individually, Hribar qualified for the all-around final where she finished seventh. In the uneven bars event final, she won the bronze medal. The same team finished 17th at the European Championships. At the Leverkusen Cup, she won the all-around bronze medal and won gold with the Slovenian team. She finished the season at the World Championships and finished 109th during the qualification round.

=== 2019—2021 ===
Hribar missed most of the 2019 season due to shoulder surgery at the end of 2018. She finished fourth on uneven bars at the 2019 Mersin World Challenge Cup. She won gold on the uneven bars at the 2019 Salamunov Memorial and bronze on the balance beam. She competed at the 2020 European Championships but did not advance to any finals.

Hribar finished 50th in the qualification round at the 2021 European Championships. Then at the Koper and Mersin World Challenge Cups, she won bronze medals on the uneven bars. She then finished 38th in the qualification round at the 2021 World Championships.

=== 2022 ===
Hribar competed at three events during the 2022 World Cup series. In Cottbus, she finished eighth on floor exercise. Then in Doha, she finished fourth on uneven bars, sixth on balance beam, and eighth on floor exercise. In Cairo, she finished seventh on uneven bars and eighth on balance beam. Then at the Salamunov Memorial, she won the all-around, balance beam, and floor exercise titles, and she won silver on uneven bars behind Barbora Mokošová. At the Osijek World Challenge Cup, she finished eighth on the balance beam, and she finished fourth on uneven bars at the Koper World Challenge Cup. She then represented Slovenia at the 2022 Mediterranean Games, and the team finished seventh in the team final. Individually, she finished fourth in both the all-around and uneven bars finals.

Hribar and the Slovenian team finished 17th at the European Championships. Then at the Mersin World Challenge Cup, she finished sixth on the balance beam and eighth on the floor exercise. At the World Championships, she finished 36th in the qualification round, about one point out of qualifying for the all-around final.

=== 2023 ===
Hribar finished fourth on the uneven bars at the Cottbus World Cup. She then competed at the European Championships where she finished 34th during qualifications, around half a point away from qualifying for the all-around final. She competed at the World Challenge Cups in Cairo, Mersin, and Szombathely, winning bronze on floor exercise in Mersin. In October, she competed at the World Championships, and during qualifications, she placed 49th. Although she did not qualify for any individual finals, she earned a nominative berth to compete at the 2024 Olympic Games.

=== 2024 ===
Hribar began the season at the Cairo World Cup and finished seventh on the balance beam. In July she competed at the 2024 Olympic Games in Paris. She finished fifty-fifth during qualifications and did not advance to any finals.

=== 2025 ===
She competed at the European Championships where she finished 15th in all around final, which is so far the most successful result for Slovenian artistic gymnastics in any all-around final.

== Competitive history ==
Year	Event	Team	AA	VT	UB	BB	FX
Junior
2013	Zelena Jama Open		5				
2013	Leverkusen Cup	6	18				
2014	1st Italian Serie A	7					
2015	European Youth Olympic Festival	19					
2015	Olympic Hopes Cup		13				
2016	City of Jesolo Trophy		19	6			
2016	European Championships	21					
Senior
2017
2017	European Championships		47				
2017	Varna World Challenge Cup				4		8
2017	World Championships		40				
2017	Leverkusen Cup	6	9				
2018	Baku World Cup				6		
2018	Slovenian Cup		1st place, gold medalist(s)				
2018	Koper World Challenge Cup				7		
2018	Mediterranean Games	6	7		3rd place, bronze medalist(s)		
2018	European Championships	17					
2018	Leverkusen Cup	1st place, gold medalist(s)	3rd place, bronze medalist(s)				
2018	World Championships		109				
2019	Mersin World Challenge Cup				4		
2019	Salamunov Memorial				1st place, gold medalist(s)	3rd place, bronze medalist(s)	
2020
2020	European Championships				15		
2021
2021	European Championships		50				
2021	Koper World Challenge Cup				3rd place, bronze medalist(s)	5	5
2021	Mersin World Challenge Cup				3rd place, bronze medalist(s)		6
2021	World Championships		38				
2022	Cottbus World Cup						8
2022	Doha World Cup				4	6	8
2022	Cairo World Cup				7	8	
2022	Salamunov Memorial		1st place, gold medalist(s)		2nd place, silver medalist(s)	1st place, gold medalist(s)	1st place, gold medalist(s)
2022	Osijek World Challenge Cup					8	
2022	Koper World Challenge Cup				4		
2022	Mediterranean Games	7	4		4		
2022	European Championships	17					
2022	Mersin World Challenge Cup					6	8
2022	World Championships		36				
2023	Cottbus World Cup				4		
2023	European Championships		34				
2023	Mersin World Challenge Cup				7	8	3rd place, bronze medalist(s)
2023	Szombathely World Challenge Cup				4		
2023	World Championships		49				
2024	Cairo World Cup					7	
2024	Koper World Challenge Cup				1st place, gold medalist(s)		
2024	Olympic Games		55				
2025	Baku World Cup				2nd place, silver medalist(s)		
2025	Antalya World Cup				4		
2025	Doha World Cup				2nd place, silver medalist(s)		
2025	Cairo World Cup				2nd place, silver medalist(s)		
2025	Koper World Challenge Cup				1st place, gold medalist(s)	2nd place, silver medalist(s)	7
2025	European Championships		15				
2025	World Championships	—N/a	20				
2026	Antalya World Cup				3rd place, bronze medalist(s)		
2026	Cairo World Cup				3rd place, bronze medalist(s)		
2026	Koper World Challenge Cup					6	
2026	European Championships		21				
2026	Mediterranean Games		9				
