= Célia Serber =

French artistic gymnast

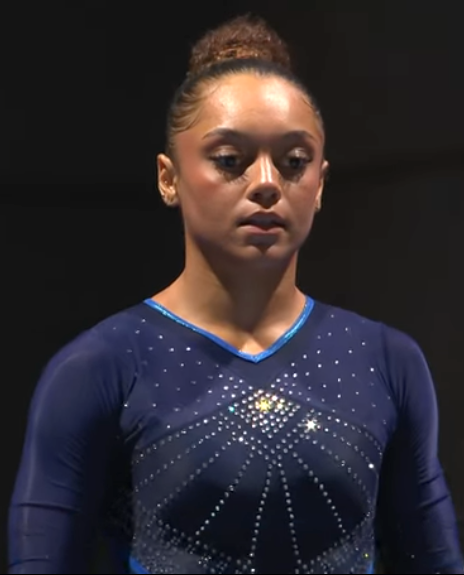
- Serber at the 2025 World University Games

Personal information
- Nickname: Cécé
- Born: 13 August 2003 (age 23) Dijon, France

Gymnastics career
- Discipline: Women's artistic gymnastics
- Country represented: France; (2016–present)
- Club: Alliance Dijon Gym 21
- Gym: INSEP
- Head coaches: Jérome Martin, Frédéric Jay
- Former coaches: Martine Georges, Alizée Dal Santo, Tara Duncanson, Nellu Pop, Nadia Masse
- Choreographer: Grégory Milan
Medal record
Women's artistic gymnastics
Representing France
Mediterranean Games
Silver medal – second place	2022 Oran	Team
World University Games
Bronze medal – third place	2025 Rhine-Ruhr	Team
FIG World Cup
Event / 1st / 2nd / 3rd; World Challenge Cup / 0 / 2 / 0

Célia Serber (born 13 August 2003) is a French artistic gymnast and a member of the French national team. She competed at the 2021 World Championships and was the alternate for France's 2020 Olympic team. She won a silver medal with the French team at the 2022 Mediterranean Games. She is the 2017 and 2018 junior national champion in the all-around.

== Gymnastics career ==
=== Junior ===
Serber represented France at the 2017 European Youth Olympic Festival and won the bronze medal on the floor exercise behind Ksenia Klimenko and Emelie Petz. Additionally, she finished sixth in the all-around and with the French team. She competed at the 2018 City of Jesolo Trophy and helped the French team win the bronze medal behind Italy and Russia. Individually, Serber won the bronze medal in the all-around behind Vladislava Urazova and Giorgia Villa. Then in the event finals, she won the gold medal on the vault and the bronze medal on the floor exercise.

=== Senior ===
Serber made her senior debut at the 2019 American Cup, where she finished eighth in the all-around. She was an alternate for the French team at the 2019 World Championships.

In June 2021, Serber was selected as an alternate to the French team for the postponed-2020 Summer Olympics. She then competed at the 2021 World Championships and qualified for the all-around final, finishing 20th.

Serber competed with the French team that finished sixth at the 2022 City of Jesolo Trophy, and she placed 20th in the all-around. She then won a silver medal on the uneven bars at the 2022 Varna World Challenge Cup, behind teammate Aline Friess. She represented France at the 2022 Mediterranean Games and helped the team win the silver medal behind Italy. She was initially knocked out of the uneven bars final due to the two-per-country rule, but she was called up after Lorette Charpy withdrew due to a knee injury. She finished in seventh place.

Serber competed at the 2024 Christmas Cup, an online competition hosted by European Gymnastics. She won the gold medals on the uneven bars and the floor exercise.

== Competitive history ==
Competitive history of Célia Serber at the junior level
Year	Event	Team	AA	VT	UB	BB	FX
2016	French Review		4		3rd place, bronze medalist(s)	3rd place, bronze medalist(s)	
2016	Elite Gym Massilia		7				
2016	Top Gym Tournament	1st place, gold medalist(s)	1st place, gold medalist(s)	2nd place, silver medalist(s)	1st place, gold medalist(s)	1st place, gold medalist(s)	6
2017	France Top 12 Championships	3rd place, bronze medalist(s)					
2017	City of Jesolo Trophy	5	19				
2017	French Championships		1st place, gold medalist(s)	1st place, gold medalist(s)		7	8
2017	FIT Challenge	2nd place, silver medalist(s)	7				
2017	German Junior Friendly		6	2nd place, silver medalist(s)			
2017	European Youth Olympic Festival	6	6				3rd place, bronze medalist(s)
2017	Elite Gym Massilia	2nd place, silver medalist(s)	3rd place, bronze medalist(s)	6			
2018	City of Jesolo Trophy	3rd place, bronze medalist(s)	3rd place, bronze medalist(s)	1st place, gold medalist(s)		4	3rd place, bronze medalist(s)
2018	French Championships		1st place, gold medalist(s)	2nd place, silver medalist(s)	6		3rd place, bronze medalist(s)

Competitive history of Célia Serber at the senior level
Year	Event	Team	AA	VT	UB	BB	FX
2019	American Cup		8				
2019	DTB Team Challenge	4	17				
2019	French Championships		7				6
2019	Worms Friendly	3rd place, bronze medalist(s)	13				
2019	World Championships	5 (Note: Serber was the team alternate.)					
2021	French Championships		3rd place, bronze medalist(s)		3rd place, bronze medalist(s)	6	3rd place, bronze medalist(s)
2021	World Championships		20				
2022	City of Jesolo Trophy	6	20				
2022	Varna Challenge Cup				2nd place, silver medalist(s)		
2022	Mediterranean Games	2nd place, silver medalist(s)			7		
2023	French Championships		5			4	
2023	Heidelberg Friendly	3rd place, bronze medalist(s)	10				
2024	Varna World Challenge Cup				8		
2024	French Championships		10		2nd place, silver medalist(s)		
2024	Christmas Cup				1st place, gold medalist(s)	4	1st place, gold medalist(s)
2025	World University Games	3rd place, bronze medalist(s)	4		4		
2025	Paris World Challenge Cup				2nd place, silver medalist(s)		
2025	World Championships		32				
2026	City of Jesolo Trophy	2nd place, silver medalist(s)	14				
2026	French Championships		7	1st place, gold medalist(s)			
2026	Mediterranean Games	4	8				
2026	World Championships	4					
