= Artemisia Iorfino =

Italian artistic gymnast (born 2009)

- Born: 11 August 2009 (age 17) Tollegno, Italy

Gymnastics career
- Discipline: Women's artistic gymnastics
- Country represented: Italy
Medal record
Representing Italy
Mediterranean Games
| Gold medal – first place | 2026 Taranto | Team |
| Bronze medal – third place | 2026 Taranto | Uneven bars |

Artemisia Iorfino (born 11 August 2009) is an Italian artistic gymnast.

== Gymnastics career ==
In April 2025, Iorfino was selected to compete at the 2025 City of Jesolo Trophy. She helped Italy win bronze in the team event.

In July 2026, she competed at the Italian Championships and won bronze on uneven bars with a score of 14.200. In August 2026, she was selected to represent Italy at the 2026 Mediterranean Games. She helped Italy win gold in the team event. Individually, she qualified for the all-around and uneven bars finals.
