= Benedetta Gava =

Italian artistic gymnast (born 2009)

- Born: 22 May 2009 (age 17) Conegliano, Italy

Gymnastics career
- Discipline: Women's artistic gymnastics
- Country represented: Italy
Medal record
Representing Italy
Mediterranean Games
Gold medal – first place	2026 Taranto	Team
Gold medal – first place	2026 Taranto	Vault
Gold medal – first place	2026 Taranto	Floor exercise

Benedetta Gava (born 22 May 2009) is an Italian artistic gymnast. She is the 2024 Junior European vault champion.

== Gymnastics career ==
In April 2023, Gava competed at the 2023 City of Jesolo Trophy and helped Italy win the junior team all-around gold. Individually she won gold on vault.

She represented Italy at the 2024 Junior European Championships and won gold on vault with a score of 13.666. She also recorded the fifth highest score in the all-around, however, only a maximum of two gymnasts per country were eligible for ranking, as compatriots Giulia Perotti and Emma Fioravanti ranked higher.

In March 2026, she made her senior debut at the 2026 City of Jesolo Trophy and won gold on vault. In August 2026, she competed at the 2026 Mediterranean Games and helped Italy win gold in the team event.

== Competitive history ==
Competitive history of Benedetta Gava at the junior level
Year	Event	Team	AA	VT	UB	BB	FX
2023	City of Jesolo Trophy	1st place, gold medalist(s)		1st place, gold medalist(s)			
2023	European Youth Olympic Festival	1st place, gold medalist(s)					
2024	City of Jesolo Trophy	2nd place, silver medalist(s)					
2024	European Championships	2nd place, silver medalist(s)		1st place, gold medalist(s)			
2024	Italian Gold Championships			1st place, gold medalist(s)	2nd place, silver medalist(s)		1st place, gold medalist(s)

Competitive history of Benedetta Gava at the senior level
Year	Event	Team	AA	VT	UB	BB	FX
2026	City of Jesolo Trophy	5		1st place, gold medalist(s)			
2026	Mediterranean Games	1st place, gold medalist(s)		1st place, gold medalist(s)			1st place, gold medalist(s)
