= Gymnastics at the 2022 Asian Games – Women's uneven bars =

Women's uneven bars at the 2022 Asian Games
- Venue: Huanglong Gymnasium
- Date: 25–28 September 2023
- Competitors: 34 from 10 nations

Medalists
gold medal	An Chang-ok	North Korea
silver medal	Mikako Serita	Japan
bronze medal	Zuo Tong	China

The women's uneven bars competition at the 2022 Asian Games took place on 25 and 28 September 2023 at Huanglong Sports Centre Gymnasium.

== Schedule ==
All times are China Standard Time (UTC+08:00)

Date	Time	Event
Monday, 25 September 2023	10:00	Qualification
Thursday, 28 September 2023	16:18	Final

== Results ==
=== Qualification ===
Rank	Athlete	Score
1	Tang Xijing (CHN)	14.466
2	Zuo Tong (CHN)	13.933
3	An Chang-ok (PRK)	13.933
4	Zhang Jin (CHN)	13.533
5	Zhang Xinyi (CHN)	13.533
5	Mikako Serita (JPN)	13.533
7	Kim Su-jong (PRK)	13.433
8	Mana Okamura (JPN)	12.933
9	Kohane Ushioku (JPN)	12.833
10	Kim Son-hyang (PRK)	12.733
11	Misaki Masui (JPN)	12.100
12	Yun Bo-eun (KOR)	12.066
13	Aida Bauyrzhanova (KAZ)	12.000
14	Sim Hae-win (PRK)	11.900
15	Nadine Joy Nathan (SGP)	11.733
16	Lai Pin-ju (TPE)	11.566
17	Ting Hua-tien (TPE)	11.566
18	Lin Yi-chen (TPE)	11.433
19	An Yeon-jeong (KOR)	11.333
20	Chang Tzu-ling (TPE)	11.233
21	Samantha Macasu (PHI)	10.666
22	Oh So-seon (KOR)	10.400
23	Kaitlyn Lim (SGP)	10.366
24	Pranati Nayak (IND)	10.300
25	Lim Su-min (KOR)	10.200
26	Amina Khalimarden (KAZ)	10.000
27	Shandy Poh (SGP)	9.900
28	Anfissa Ivanova (KAZ)	9.733
29	Ananya Patanakul (THA)	9.433
30	Kursten Lopez (PHI)	9.033
31	Sasiwimon Mueangphuan (THA)	8.966
32	Korkem Yerbossynkyzy (KAZ)	8.366
33	Emma Yap (SGP)	7.466
34	Thantida Ruecker (THA)	7.266

=== Final ===
Rank	Athlete	Score
1st place, gold medalist(s)	An Chang-ok (PRK)	14.266
2nd place, silver medalist(s)	Mikako Serita (JPN)	13.933
3rd place, bronze medalist(s)	Zuo Tong (CHN)	13.866
4	Kim Su-jong (PRK)	13.200
5	Tang Xijing (CHN)	12.900
6	Yun Bo-eun (KOR)	12.166
7	Aida Bauyrzhanova (KAZ)	11.566
8	Mana Okamura (JPN)	11.200
