= Gymnastics at the 2024 Summer Olympics – Women's artistic qualification =

Qualification for women's artistic gymnastics competitions at the 2024 Summer Olympics was held on 28 July 2024 at the Accor Arena (referred to as the Bercy Arena due to IOC sponsorship rules). The results of the qualification determined the qualifiers to the finals: 8 teams in the team final, 24 gymnasts in the individual all-around final, and 8 gymnasts in each of 4 apparatus finals. The competition was divided into five subdivisions.

== Subdivisions ==
Gymnasts from nations taking part in the team all-around event were grouped together while the remaining gymnasts were grouped into one of eight mixed groups. The groups were divided into the five subdivisions after a draw held by the Fédération Internationale de Gymnastique. The groups rotated through each of the four apparatuses together.

| | Vault (gymnastics) | Uneven bars | Balance beam | Floor (gymnastics) |
| Subdivision 1 (9:30) | Great Britain | Mixed Group 7 Caitlin Rooskrantz (RSA); Lena Bickel (SUI); Anna Lashchevska (UKR); Valentina Georgieva (BUL) | Romania | Mixed Group 1 Natalia Escalera (MEX); Alexa Moreno (MEX); Ahtziri Sandoval (MEX); Rifda Irfanaluthfi (INA) |
| Subdivision 2 (11:40) | China | Mixed Group 2 Helen Kevric (GER); Pauline Schäfer-Betz (GER); Sarah Voss (GER); Kaylia Nemour (ALG); Lihie Raz (ISR) | United States | Italy |
| Subdivision 3 (14:50) | Mixed Group 6 Filipa Martins (POR); An Chang-ok (PRK); Hillary Heron (PAN); Luisa Blanco (COL) | Japan | Mixed Group 4 Aleah Finnegan (PHI); Emma Malabuyo (PHI); Levi Ruivivar (PHI); Georgia-Rose Brown (NZL) | Netherlands |
| Subdivision 4 (18:00) | Canada | France | South Korea | Mixed Group 3 Soňa Artamonova (CZE); Lynnzee Brown (HAI); Charlize Mörz (AUT); Lucija Hribar (SLO) |
| Subdivision 5 (21:10) | Brazil | Mixed Group 5 Csenge Bácskay (HUN); Bettina Lili Czifra (HUN); Zója Székely (HUN); Ting Hua-tien (TPE); Jana Mahmoud (EGY) | Mixed Group 8 Laura Casabuena (ESP); Ana Pérez (ESP); Alba Petisco (ESP); Maellyse Brassart (BEL); Nina Derwael (BEL) | Australia |

== Results ==
| Team/Gymnast | Vault (gymnastics) | | Uneven bars | | Balance beam | | Floor (gymnastics) | | Total (All-around) | |
| Team/Gymnast | Score (Note: Gymnasts who wanted to qualify for the vault final performed a second vault, with the average of the two counting for event final qualification. Only the first vault counted for individual and team all-around qualification.) | Rank | Score | Rank | Score | Rank | Score | Rank | Score | Rank |
Teams
| United States | 44.799 | 1 | 43.565 | 2 | 42.366 | 1 | 41.566 | 1 | 172.296 | 1 |
| Simone Biles (USA) | 15.800/14.800; Avg: 15.300 | 1 | 14.433 | 9 | 14.733 | 2 | 14.600 | 1 | 59.566 | 1 |
| Jade Carey (USA) | 14.666/14.200; Avg: 14.433 | 3 | – | – | – | – | 10.633 | 74 | – | – |
| Jordan Chiles (USA) | 14.333/14.100; Avg: 14.216 | 4 | 14.266 | 13 | 13.600 | 14 | 13.866 | 3 | 56.065 | 4 |
| Sunisa Lee (USA) | 14.133 | – | 14.866 | 3 | 14.033 | 4 | 13.100 | 24 | 56.132 | 3 |
| Hezly Rivera (USA) | – | – | 13.900 | 20 | 12.633 | 46 | – | – | – | – |
| Italy | 41.632 | 6 | 43.198 | 3 | 41.198 | 4 | 40.833 | 3 | 166.861 | 2 |
| Angela Andreoli (ITA) | 13.733 | – | – | – | 13.366 | 25 | 13.500 | 13 | – | – |
| Alice D'Amato (ITA) | 13.200 | – | 14.666 | 6 | 13.866 | 7 | 13.700 | 5 | 55.432 | 7 |
| Manila Esposito (ITA) | 14.133 | – | 14.166 | 15 | 13.966 | 6 | 13.633 | 7 | 55.898 | 6 |
| Elisa Iorio (ITA) | 13.766 | – | 14.366 | 12 | 12.966 | 39 | 12.800 | 35 | 53.898 | 13 |
| Giorgia Villa (ITA) | – | – | 13.666 | 27 | – | – | – | – | – | – |
| China | 40.099 | 11 | 43.732 | 1 | 42.132 | 2 | 40.665 | 5 | 166.628 | 3 |
| Luo Huan (CHN) | – | – | 13.900 | 20 | 13.733 | 11 | – | – | – | – |
| Ou Yushan (CHN) | 13.000 | – | 13.966 | 17 | 13.333 | 27 | 13.666 | 6 | 53.965 | 12 |
| Qiu Qiyuan (CHN) | 13.233 | – | 15.066 | 2 | 13.533 | 18 | 13.166 | 20 | 54.998 | 8 |
| Zhang Yihan (CHN) | 13.833 | – | 14.700 | 5 | – | – | 13.533 | 10 | – | – |
| Zhou Yaqin (CHN) | 13.033 | – | – | – | 14.866 | 1 | 13.466 | 14 | – | – |
| Brazil | 42.733 | 2 | 41.433 | 4 | 41.433 | 3 | 40.900 | 2 | 166.499 | 4 |
| Rebeca Andrade (BRA) | 14.900/14.466; Avg: 14.683 | 2 | 14.400 | 10 | 14.500 | 3 | 13.900 | 2 | 57.700 | 2 |
| Jade Barbosa (BRA) | 13.733 | – | 12.733 | 55 | 13.100 | 34 | 13.500 | 12 | 53.066 | 20 |
| Lorrane Oliveira (BRA) | 12.900 | – | 13.233 | 38 | – | – | – | – | – | – |
| Flávia Saraiva (BRA) | 14.100 | – | 13.800 | 23 | 13.133 | 33 | 13.166 | 21 | 54.199 | 11 |
| Júlia Soares (BRA) | – | – | – | – | 13.800 | 8 | 13.500 | 11 | – | – |
| Japan | 40.965 | 8 | 40.432 | 7 | 40.733 | 6 | 40.066 | 6 | 162.196 | 5 |
| Rina Kishi (JPN) | 14.033 | – | 13.566 | 30 | 13.500 | 20 | 13.600 | 8 | 54.699 | 10 |
| Haruka Nakamura (JPN) | 13.066 | – | 13.600 | 29 | 13.600 | 14 | 13.266 | 17 | 53.532 | 17 |
| Mana Okamura (JPN) | 13.033 | – | 13.266 | 37 | 13.633 | 13 | 13.200 | 19 | 53.132 | 19 |
| Kohane Ushioku (JPN) | 13.866 | – | 12.833 | 49 | 12.866 | 40 | 12.566 | 46 | 52.131 | 27 |
| Canada | 42.133 | 4 | 41.132 | 6 | 39.199 | 11 | 39.099 | 8 | 161.563 | 6 |
| Ellie Black (CAN) | 14.100/13.900; Avg: 14.000 | 8 | 14.166 | 16 | 13.100 | 35 | 13.400 | 15 | 54.766 | 9 |
| Cassie Lee (CAN) | – | – | 12.166 | 68 | 13.466 | 21 | 12.366 | 56 | – | – |
| Shallon Olsen (CAN) | 14.433/13.900; Avg: 14.166 | 7 | – | – | – | – | – | – | – | – |
| Ava Stewart (CAN) | 13.600 | – | 13.466 | 33 | 12.633 | 47 | 12.633 | 44 | 52.332 | 26 |
| Aurélie Tran (CAN) | 13.166 | – | 13.500 | 31 | 12.066 | 62 | 13.066 | 26 | 51.798 | 29 |
| Great Britain | 41.966 | 5 | 39.399 | 9 | 40.333 | 8 | 39.132 | 7 | 160.830 | 7 |
| Becky Downie (GBR) | – | – | 14.666 | 7 | 13.400 | 23 | – | – | – | – |
| Ruby Evans (GBR) | 14.200 | – | 11.200 | 77 | 12.600 | 48 | 13.133 | 23 | 51.133 | 38 |
| Georgia-Mae Fenton (GBR) | 13.833 | – | 12.833 | 51 | 13.500 | 19 | 12.466 | 52 | 52.632 | 24 |
| Alice Kinsella (GBR) | 13.933 | – | 11.900 | 69 | 13.433 | 22 | 12.733 | 38 | 51.999 | 28 |
| Abigail Martin (GBR) | 13.766 | – | – | – | – | – | 13.266 | 18 | – | – |
| Romania | 40.966 | 7 | 36.999 | 12 | 40.799 | 5 | 40.733 | 4 | 159.497 | 8 |
| Ana Bărbosu (ROU) | 13.800/13.466; Avg: 13.633 | 15 | 12.600 | 57 | 13.533 | 17 | 13.600 | 8 | 53.533 | 16 |
| Lilia Cosman (ROU) | 13.500 | – | 11.333 | 76 | 12.833 | 41 | 12.466 | 53 | 50.132 | 50 |
| Amalia Ghigoarță (ROU) | 13.000 | – | 13.066 | 43 | 13.266 | 30 | 13.333 | 16 | 52.665 | 23 |
| Sabrina Voinea (ROU) | 13.666 | – | – | – | 14.000 | 5 | 13.800 | 4 | – | – |
| Andreea Preda (ROU) | – | – | 10.933 | 79 | – | – | – | – | – | – |
| Netherlands | 40.133 | 10 | 41.432 | 5 | 40.432 | 7 | 37.099 | 12 | 159.096 | 9 |
| Tisha Volleman (NED) | 13.133 | – | 12.766 | 53 | 12.500 | 51 | 12.566 | 47 | 50.965 | 42 |
| Sanna Veerman (NED) | 13.600 | – | 14.400 | 11 | – | – | – | – | – | – |
| Naomi Visser (NED) | 13.233 | – | 14.266 | 13 | 13.300 | 28 | 12.233 | 65 | 53.032 | 21 |
| Lieke Wevers (NED) | 13.300 | – | 12.566 | 59 | 13.366 | 24 | 12.300 | 61 | 51.532 | 32 |
| Sanne Wevers (NED) | – | – | – | – | 13.766 | 9 | – | – | – | – |
| Australia | 40.700 | 9 | 40.299 | 8 | 40.033 | 9 | 37.932 | 10 | 158.964 | 10 |
| Kate McDonald (AUS) | – | – | 13.633 | 28 | 13.033 | 37 | 12.100 | 66 | – | – |
| Emma Nedov (AUS) | 13.200 | – | 12.766 | 54 | 11.800 | 66 | 12.333 | 60 | 50.099 | 51 |
| Ruby Pass (AUS) | 13.800/12.900; Avg: 13.350 | 18 | 13.900 | 19 | 13.300 | 29 | 12.866 | 30 | 53.866 | 14 |
| Breanna Scott (AUS) | 13.300 | – | – | – | 13.700 | 12 | – | – | – | – |
| Emily Whitehead (AUS) | 13.600 | – | 12.333 | 62 | – | – | 12.733 | 39 | – | – |
| France | 42.633 | 3 | 38.466 | 10 | 39.665 | 10 | 38.033 | 9 | 158.797 | 11 |
| Marine Boyer (FRA) | – | – | 13.200 | 39 | 13.766 | 10 | 12.833 | 33 | – | – |
| Mélanie de Jesus dos Santos (FRA) | 14.200 | – | 12.233 | 67 | 12.366 | 52 | 12.700 | 41 | 51.499 | 33 |
| Coline Devillard (FRA) | 14.200/13.100; Avg: 13.650 | 13 | – | – | 10.866 | 75 | – | – | – | – |
| Morgane Osyssek (FRA) | 13.300 | – | 11.600 | 73 | 13.533 | 16 | 12.033 | 67 | 50.466 | 48 |
| Ming van Eijken (FRA) | 14.233/13.333; Avg: 13.783 | 11 | 13.033 | 44 | – | – | 12.500 | 51 | – | – |
| South Korea | 39.966 | 12 | 37.532 | 11 | 37.366 | 12 | 37.632 | 11 | 152.496 | 12 |
| Eom Do-hyun (KOR) | – | – | 12.233 | 66 | 12.300 | 56 | 12.366 | 59 | – | – |
| Lee Yun-seo (KOR) | 12.700 | – | 12.333 | 63 | 12.000 | 63 | 10.066 | 75 | 47.099 | 56 |
| Lee Da-yeong (KOR) | 12.866 | – | 11.766 | 72 | – | – | – | – | – | – |
| Shin Sol-yi (KOR) | 12.133 | – | 12.966 | 47 | 12.366 | 53 | 12.533 | 50 | 49.998 | 52 |
| Yeo Seo-jeong (KOR) | 14.400/13.966; Avg: 14.183 | 5 | – | – | 12.700 | 44 | 12.733 | 40 | – | – |
Individuals
| Kaylia Nemour (ALG) | 14.000 | – | 15.600 | 1 | 13.200 | 32 | 13.166 | 22 | 55.966 | 5 |
| Helen Kevric (GER) | 14.066 | – | 14.600 | 8 | 12.133 | 61 | 13.066 | 27 | 53.865 | 15 |
| Ana Filipa Martins (POR) | 14.133 | – | 13.800 | 22 | 12.600 | 49 | 12.633 | 42 | 53.166 | 18 |
| Bettina Lili Czifra (HUN) | 12.966 | – | 13.933 | 18 | 13.233 | 31 | 12.600 | 45 | 52.732 | 22 |
| Sarah Voss (GER) | 14.000 | – | 13.466 | 32 | 12.233 | 58 | 12.866 | 31 | 52.565 | 25 |
| Luisa Blanco (COL) | 13.466 | – | 12.833 | 48 | 12.766 | 42 | 12.633 | 42 | 51.698 | 30 |
| Lihie Raz (ISR) | 13.666/13.233; Avg: 13.449 | 16 | 12.833 | 50 | 12.300 | 55 | 12.833 | 33 | 51.632 | 31 |
| Georgia-Rose Brown (NZL) | 13.233 | – | 13.666 | 26 | 12.333 | 54 | 12.233 | 63 | 51.465 | 34 |
| Laura Casabuena (ESP) | 13.066 | – | 13.133 | 41 | 12.166 | 60 | 13.033 | 28 | 51.398 | 35 |
| Alba Petisco (ESP) | 13.466 | – | 13.400 | 36 | 12.633 | 45 | 11.800 | 69 | 51.299 | 36 |
| Maellyse Brassart (BEL) | 13.300 | – | 13.766 | 24 | 11.600 | 69 | 12.533 | 49 | 51.199 | 37 |
| Lena Bickel (SUI) | 13.366 | – | 12.266 | 64 | 13.066 | 36 | 12.433 | 55 | 51.131 | 39 |
| Levi Ruivivar (PHI) | 13.600 | – | 13.200 | 40 | 11.866 | 64 | 12.433 | 54 | 51.099 | 40 |
| Emma Malabuyo (PHI) | 13.266 | – | 12.500 | 60 | 12.233 | 57 | 13.100 | 25 | 51.099 | 41 |
| Alexa Moreno (MEX) | 14.166/13.733; Avg: 13.949 | 10 | 12.633 | 56 | 11.200 | 74 | 12.800 | 36 | 50.799 | 43 |
| Hillary Heron (PAN) | 13.800/13.500; Avg: 13.650 | 14 | 11.766 | 71 | 12.166 | 59 | 13.033 | 29 | 50.765 | 44 |
| Ana Pérez (ESP) | 13.066 | – | 13.033 | 45 | 11.800 | 67 | 12.866 | 31 | 50.765 | 45 |
| Soňa Artamonova (CZE) | 13.000 | – | 12.333 | 61 | 12.966 | 38 | 12.300 | 62 | 50.599 | 46 |
| Aleah Finnegan (PHI) | 13.733/13.033; Avg: 13.383 | 17 | 12.566 | 58 | 11.466 | 71 | 12.733 | 37 | 50.498 | 47 |
| Anna Lashchevska (UKR) | 12.833 | – | 13.033 | 46 | 11.866 | 65 | 12.566 | 48 | 50.298 | 49 |
| Lynnzee Brown (HAI) | 13.566 | – | 11.500 | 74 | 11.533 | 70 | 12.233 | 64 | 48.832 | 53 |
| Ahtziri Sandoval (MEX) | 12.500/12.600; Avg: 12.550 | 19 | 12.266 | 65 | 11.733 | 68 | 11.833 | 68 | 48.332 | 54 |
| Lucija Hribar (SLO) | 13.133 | – | 13.133 | 42 | 10.133 | 78 | 11.666 | 71 | 48.065 | 55 |
| Charlize Mörz (AUT) | 12.500 | – | 11.766 | 70 | 11.100 | 75 | 11.733 | 70 | 47.099 | 57 |
| Jana Mahmoud (EGY) | 11.866 | – | 11.066 | 78 | 11.400 | 72 | 12.366 | 58 | 46.698 | 58 |
| Caitlin Rooskrantz (RSA) | – | – | 13.733 | 25 | 11.333 | 73 | 10.866 | 73 | – | – |
| An Chang-ok (PRK) | 14.066/14.300; Avg: 14.183 | 6 | 13.433 | 35 | – | – | 11.666 | 72 | – | – |
| Valentina Georgieva (BUL) | 14.166/13.833; Avg: 13.999 | 9 | 11.500 | 75 | 10.633 | 77 | – | – | – | – |
| Nina Derwael (BEL) | – | – | 14.733 | 4 | 12.766 | 43 | – | – | – | – |
| Pauline Schäfer (GER) | – | – | – | – | 13.366 | 26 | 12.366 | 56 | – | – |
| Csenge Bácskay (HUN) | 13.900/13.633; Avg: 13.766 | 12 | – | – | – | – | – | – | – | – |
| Zója Székely (HUN) | – | – | 13.433 | 34 | – | – | – | – | – | – |
| Natalia Escalera (MEX) | – | – | 12.800 | 52 | – | – | – | – | – | – |
| Ting Hua-tien (TPE) | – | – | – | – | 12.533 | 50 | – | – | – | – |
| Rifda Irfanaluthfi (INA) | – | – | 9.166 | 80 | – | – | – | – | – | – |

=== Team ===
| Rank | Team | Vault (gymnastics) | Uneven bars | Balance beam | Floor (gymnastics) | Total | Qual. |
|---|---|---|---|---|---|---|---|
| 1 | United States | 44.799 (1) | 43.565 (2) | 42.366 (1) | 41.566 (1) | 172.296 | Q |
| 1 | Simone Biles (USA) | 15.800 | 14.433 | 14.733 | 14.600 | 172.296 | Q |
| 1 | Jade Carey (USA) | 14.666 | | | 10.633 | 172.296 | Q |
| 1 | Jordan Chiles (USA) | 14.333 | 14.266 | 13.600 | 13.866 | 172.296 | Q |
| 1 | Sunisa Lee (USA) | 14.133 | 14.866 | 14.033 | 13.100 | 172.296 | Q |
| 1 | Hezly Rivera (USA) | | 13.900 | 12.633 | | 172.296 | Q |
| 2 | Italy | 41.632 (6) | 43.198 (3) | 41.198 (4) | 40.833 (3) | 166.861 | Q |
| 2 | Angela Andreoli (ITA) | 13.733 | | 13.366 | 13.500 | 166.861 | Q |
| 2 | Alice D'Amato (ITA) | 13.200 | 14.666 | 13.866 | 13.700 | 166.861 | Q |
| 2 | Manila Esposito (ITA) | 14.133 | 14.166 | 13.966 | 13.633 | 166.861 | Q |
| 2 | Elisa Iorio (ITA) | 13.766 | 14.366 | 12.966 | 12.800 | 166.861 | Q |
| 2 | Giorgia Villa (ITA) | | 13.666 | | | 166.861 | Q |
| 3 | China | 40.099 (11) | 43.732 (1) | 42.132 (2) | 40.665 (5) | 166.628 | Q |
| 3 | Luo Huan (CHN) | | 13.900 | 13.733 | | 166.628 | Q |
| 3 | Ou Yushan (CHN) | 13.000 | 13.966 | 13.333 | 13.666 | 166.628 | Q |
| 3 | Qiu Qiyuan (CHN) | 13.233 | 15.066 | 13.533 | 13.166 | 166.628 | Q |
| 3 | Zhang Yihan (CHN) | 13.833 | 14.700 | | 13.533 | 166.628 | Q |
| 3 | Zhou Yaqin (CHN) | 13.033 | | 14.866 | 13.466 | 166.628 | Q |
| 4 | Brazil | 42.733 (2) | 41.433 (4) | 41.433 (3) | 40.900 (2) | 166.499 | Q |
| 4 | Rebeca Andrade (BRA) | 14.900 | 14.400 | 14.500 | 13.900 | 166.499 | Q |
| 4 | Jade Barbosa (BRA) | 13.733 | 12.733 | 13.100 | 13.500 | 166.499 | Q |
| 4 | Lorrane Oliveira (BRA) | 12.900 | 13.233 | | | 166.499 | Q |
| 4 | Flávia Saraiva (BRA) | 14.100 | 13.800 | 13.133 | 13.166 | 166.499 | Q |
| 4 | Júlia Soares (BRA) | | | 13.800 | 13.500 | 166.499 | Q |
| 5 | Japan | 40.965 (8) | 40.432 (7) | 40.733 (6) | 40.066 (6) | 162.196 | Q |
| 5 | Rina Kishi (JPN) | 14.033 | 13.566 | 13.500 | 13.600 | 162.196 | Q |
| 5 | Haruka Nakamura (JPN) | 13.066 | 13.600 | 13.600 | 13.266 | 162.196 | Q |
| 5 | Mana Okamura (JPN) | 13.033 | 13.266 | 13.633 | 13.200 | 162.196 | Q |
| 5 | Kohane Ushioku (JPN) | 13.866 | 12.833 | 12.866 | 12.566 | 162.196 | Q |
| 6 | Canada | 42.133 (4) | 41.132 (6) | 39.199 (11) | 39.099 (8) | 161.563 | Q |
| 6 | Ellie Black (CAN) | 14.100 | 14.166 | 13.100 | 13.400 | 161.563 | Q |
| 6 | Cassie Lee (CAN) | | 12.166 | 13.466 | 12.366 | 161.563 | Q |
| 6 | Shallon Olsen (CAN) | 14.433 | | | | 161.563 | Q |
| 6 | Ava Stewart (CAN) | 13.600 | 13.466 | 12.633 | 12.633 | 161.563 | Q |
| 6 | Aurélie Tran (CAN) | 13.166 | 13.500 | 12.066 | 13.066 | 161.563 | Q |
| 7 | Great Britain | 41.966 (5) | 39.399 (9) | 40.333 (8) | 39.132 (7) | 160.830 | Q |
| 7 | Becky Downie (GBR) | | 14.666 | 13.400 | | 160.830 | Q |
| 7 | Ruby Evans (GBR) | 14.200 | 11.200 | 12.600 | 13.133 | 160.830 | Q |
| 7 | Georgia-Mae Fenton (GBR) | 13.833 | 12.833 | 13.500 | 12.466 | 160.830 | Q |
| 7 | Alice Kinsella (GBR) | 13.933 | 11.900 | 13.433 | 12.733 | 160.830 | Q |
| 7 | Abigail Martin (GBR) | 13.766 | | | 13.266 | 160.830 | Q |
| 8 | Romania | 40.966 (7) | 36.999 (12) | 40.799 (5) | 40.733 (4) | 159.497 | Q |
| 8 | Ana Bărbosu (ROU) | 13.800 | 12.600 | 13.533 | 13.600 | 159.497 | Q |
| 8 | Lilia Cosman (ROU) | 13.500 | 11.333 | 12.833 | 12.466 | 159.497 | Q |
| 8 | Amalia Ghigoarță (ROU) | 13.000 | 13.066 | 13.266 | 13.333 | 159.497 | Q |
| 8 | Sabrina Voinea (ROU) | 13.666 | | 14.000 | 13.800 | 159.497 | Q |
| 8 | Andreea Preda (ROU) | | 10.933 | | | 159.497 | Q |
| 9 | Netherlands | 40.133 (10) | 41.432 (5) | 40.432 (7) | 37.099 (12) | 159.096 | R1 |
| 9 | Tisha Volleman (NED) | 13.133 | 12.766 | 12.500 | 12.566 | 159.096 | R1 |
| 9 | Sanna Veerman (NED) | 13.600 | 14.400 | | – | 159.096 | R1 |
| 9 | Naomi Visser (NED) | 13.233 | 14.266 | 13.300 | 12.233 | 159.096 | R1 |
| 9 | Lieke Wevers (NED) | 13.300 | 12.566 | 13.366 | 12.300 | 159.096 | R1 |
| 9 | Sanne Wevers (NED) | | | 13.766 | | 159.096 | R1 |
| 10 | Australia | 40.700 (9) | 40.299 (8) | 40.033 (9) | 37.932 (10) | 158.964 | R2 |
| 10 | Kate McDonald (AUS) | | 13.633 | 13.033 | 12.100 | 158.964 | R2 |
| 10 | Emma Nedov (AUS) | 13.200 | 12.766 | 11.800 | 12.333 | 158.964 | R2 |
| 10 | Ruby Pass (AUS) | 13.800 | 13.900 | 13.300 | 12.866 | 158.964 | R2 |
| 10 | Breanna Scott (AUS) | 13.300 | | 13.700 | | 158.964 | R2 |
| 10 | Emily Whitehead (AUS) | 13.600 | 12.333 | | 12.733 | 158.964 | R2 |

=== Individual all-around ===
| Rank | Gymnast | Vault (gymnastics) | Uneven bars | Balance beam | Floor (gymnastics) | Total | Qual. |
|---|---|---|---|---|---|---|---|
| 1 | Simone Biles (USA) | 15.800 | 14.433 | 14.733 | 14.600 | 59.566 | Q |
| 2 | Rebeca Andrade (BRA) | 14.900 | 14.400 | 14.500 | 13.900 | 57.700 | Q |
| 3 | Sunisa Lee (USA) | 14.133 | 14.866 | 14.033 | 13.100 | 56.132 | Q |
| 4 | Jordan Chiles (USA) | 14.333 | 14.266 | 13.600 | 13.866 | 56.065 | – |
| 5 | Kaylia Nemour (ALG) | 14.000 | 15.600 | 13.200 | 13.166 | 55.966 | Q |
| 6 | Manila Esposito (ITA) | 14.133 | 14.166 | 13.966 | 13.633 | 55.898 | Q |
| 7 | Alice D'Amato (ITA) | 13.200 | 14.666 | 13.866 | 13.700 | 55.432 | Q |
| 8 | Qiu Qiyuan (CHN) | 13.233 | 15.066 | 13.533 | 13.166 | 54.998 | Q |
| 9 | Ellie Black (CAN) | 14.100 | 14.166 | 13.100 | 13.400 | 54.766 | Q |
| 10 | Rina Kishi (JPN) | 14.033 | 13.566 | 13.500 | 13.600 | 54.699 | Q |
| 11 | Flavia Saraiva (BRA) | 14.100 | 13.800 | 13.133 | 13.166 | 54.199 | Q |
| 12 | Ou Yushan (CHN) | 13.000 | 13.966 | 13.333 | 13.666 | 53.965 | Q |
| 13 | Elisa Iorio (ITA) | 13.766 | 14.366 | 12.966 | 12.800 | 53.898 | – |
| 14 | Ruby Pass (AUS) | 13.800 | 13.900 | 13.300 | 12.866 | 53.866 | Q |
| 15 | Helen Kevric (GER) | 14.066 | 14.600 | 12.133 | 13.066 | 53.865 | Q |
| 16 | Ana Bărbosu (ROU) | 13.800 | 12.600 | 13.533 | 13.600 | 53.533 | Q |
| 17 | Haruka Nakamura (JPN) | 13.066 | 13.600 | 13.600 | 13.266 | 53.532 | Q |
| 18 | Filipa Martins (POR) | 14.133 | 13.800 | 12.600 | 12.633 | 53.166 | Q |
| 19 | Mana Okamura (JPN) | 13.033 | 13.266 | 13.633 | 13.200 | 53.132 | – |
| 20 | Jade Barbosa (BRA) | 13.733 | 12.733 | 13.100 | 13.500 | 53.066 | – |
| 21 | Naomi Visser (NED) | 13.233 | 14.266 | 13.300 | 12.233 | 53.032 | Q |
| 22 | Bettina Lili Czifra (HUN) | 12.966 | 13.933 | 13.233 | 12.600 | 52.732 | Q |
| 23 | Amalia Ghigoarță (ROU) | 13.000 | 13.066 | 13.266 | 13.333 | 52.665 | Q |
| 24 | Georgia-Mae Fenton (GBR) | 13.833 | 12.833 | 13.500 | 12.466 | 52.632 | Q |
| 25 | Sarah Voss (GER) | 14.000 | 13.466 | 12.233 | 12.866 | 52.656 | Q |
| 26 | Ava Stewart (CAN) | 13.600 | 13.466 | 12.633 | 12.633 | 52.332 | Q |
| 27 | Kohane Ushioku (JPN) | 13.866 | 12.833 | 12.866 | 12.566 | 52.131 | – |
| 28 | Alice Kinsella (GBR) | 13.933 | 11.900 | 13.433 | 12.733 | 51.999 | Q |
| 29 | Aurélie Tran (CAN) | 13.166 | 13.500 | 12.066 | 13.066 | 51.798 | – |
| 30 | Luisa Blanco (COL) | 13.466 | 12.833 | 12.766 | 12.633 | 51.698 | Q |
| 31 | Lihie Raz (ISR) | 13.666 | 12.833 | 12.300 | 12.833 | 51.632 | R1 |
| 32 | Lieke Wevers (NED) | 13.300 | 12.566 | 13.366 | 12.300 | 51.532 | R2 |
| 33 | Mélanie de Jesus dos Santos (FRA) | 14.200 | 12.233 | 12.366 | 12.700 | 51.499 | R3 |
| 34 | Georgia-Rose Brown (NZL) | 13.233 | 13.666 | 12.333 | 12.233 | 51.465 | R4 |

=== Vault ===
| Rank | Gymnast | Vault 1 | | | | Vault 2 | | | | Total | Qual. |
| Rank | Gymnast | D Score | E Score | Pen. | Score 1 | D Score | E Score | Pen. | Score 2 | Total | Qual. |
|---|---|---|---|---|---|---|---|---|---|---|---|
| 1 | Simone Biles (USA) | 6.4 | 9.400 | | 15.800 | 5.6 | 9.200 | | 14.800 | 15.300 | Q |
| 2 | Rebeca Andrade (BRA) | 5.6 | 9.400 | 0.100 | 14.900 | 5.0 | 9.466 | | 14.466 | 14.683 | Q |
| 3 | Jade Carey (USA) | 5.6 | 9.166 | 0.100 | 14.666 | 5.0 | 9.200 | | 14.200 | 14.433 | Q |
| 4 | Jordan Chiles (USA) | 5.0 | 9.333 | | 14.333 | 4.8 | 9.300 | | 14.100 | 14.216 | – |
| 5 | Yeo Seo-jeong (KOR) | 5.4 | 9.000 | | 14.400 | 5.0 | 8.966 | | 13.966 | 14.183 | Q |
| 6 | An Chang-ok (PRK) | 5.0 | 9.066 | | 14.066 | 5.6 | 8.700 | | 14.300 | 14.183 | Q |
| 7 | Shallon Olsen (CAN) | 5.6 | 8.833 | | 14.433 | 5.0 | 8.900 | | 13.900 | 14.166 | Q |
| 8 | Ellie Black (CAN) | 5.0 | 9.100 | | 14.100 | 4.8 | 9.100 | | 13.900 | 14.000 | Q |
| 9 | Valentina Georgieva (BUL) | 5.0 | 9.166 | | 14.166 | 4.8 | 9.033 | | 13.833 | 13.999 | Q |
| 10 | Alexa Moreno (MEX) | 5.4 | 8.766 | | 14.166 | 5.2 | 8.533 | | 13.733 | 13.949 | R1 |
| 11 | Ming van Eijken (FRA) | 5.4 | 8.833 | | 14.233 | 4.4 | 8.933 | | 13.333 | 13.783 | R2 |
| 12 | Csenge Bácskay (HUN) | 5.0 | 8.900 | | 13.900 | 4.8 | 8.833 | | 13.633 | 13.766 | R3 |

=== Uneven bars ===
| Rank | Gymnast | D Score | E Score | Pen. | Total | Qual. |
|---|---|---|---|---|---|---|
| 1 | Kaylia Nemour (ALG) | 7.1 | 8.500 | | 15.600 | Q |
| 2 | Qiu Qiyuan (CHN) | 6.8 | 8.266 | | 15.066 | Q |
| 3 | Sunisa Lee (USA) | 6.4 | 8.466 | | 14.866 | Q |
| 4 | Nina Derwael (BEL) | 6.5 | 8.233 | | 14.733 | Q |
| 5 | Zhang Yihan (CHN) | 6.4 | 8.300 | | 14.700 | Q |
| 6 | Alice D'Amato (ITA) | 6.3 | 8.366 | | 14.666 | Q |
| 7 | Rebecca Downie (GBR) | 6.6 | 8.066 | | 14.666 | Q |
| 8 | Helen Kevric (GER) | 6.2 | 8.400 | | 14.600 | Q |
| 9 | Simone Biles (USA) | 6.2 | 8.233 | | 14.433 | R1 |
| 10 | Rebeca Andrade (BRA) | 6.1 | 8.300 | | 14.400 | R2 |
| 11 | Sanna Veerman (NED) | 6.4 | 8.000 | | 14.400 | R3 |

=== Balance beam ===
| Rank | Gymnast | D Score | E Score | Pen. | Total | Qual. |
|---|---|---|---|---|---|---|
| 1 | Zhou Yaqin (CHN) | 6.6 | 8.266 | | 14.866 | Q |
| 2 | Simone Biles (USA) | 6.4 | 8.333 | | 14.733 | Q |
| 3 | Rebeca Andrade (BRA) | 6.1 | 8.400 | | 14.500 | Q |
| 4 | Sunisa Lee (USA) | 6.0 | 8.033 | | 14.033 | Q |
| 5 | Sabrina Voinea (ROU) | 6.1 | 7.900 | | 14.000 | Q |
| 6 | Manila Esposito (ITA) | 5.6 | 8.366 | | 13.966 | Q |
| 7 | Alice D'Amato (ITA) | 5.6 | 8.266 | | 13.866 | Q |
| 8 | Julia Soares (BRA) | 5.6 | 8.200 | | 13.800 | Q |
| 9 | Sanne Wevers (NED) | 5.6 | 8.166 | | 13.766 | R1 |
| 10 | Marine Boyer (FRA) | 5.8 | 7.966 | | 13.766 | R2 |
| 11 | Luo Huan (CHN) | 6.2 | 7.533 | | 13.733 | R3 |

=== Floor ===
| Rank | Gymnast | D Score | E Score | Pen. | Total | Qual. |
|---|---|---|---|---|---|---|
| 1 | Simone Biles (USA) | 6.8 | 7.900 | 0.100 | 14.600 | Q |
| 2 | Rebeca Andrade (BRA) | 5.9 | 8.000 | | 13.900 | Q |
| 3 | Jordan Chiles (USA) | 5.8 | 8.066 | | 13.866 | Q |
| 4 | Sabrina Voinea (ROU) | 6.2 | 7.600 | | 13.800 | Q |
| 5 | Alice D'Amato (ITA) | 5.6 | 8.100 | | 13.700 | Q |
| 6 | Ou Yushan (CHN) | 5.6 | 8.066 | | 13.666 | Q |
| 7 | Manila Esposito (ITA) | 5.7 | 7.933 | | 13.633 | Q |
| 8 (Note: Rina Kishi and Ana Bărbosu tied for eighth place on the floor exercise. Because they both had the same D-score (5.6) and the same E-score (8.000), the tie was unable to be broken, meaning nine gymnasts qualified for the floor exercise final) | Rina Kishi (JPN) | 5.6 | 8.000 | | 13.600 | Q |
| 8 | Ana Bărbosu (ROU) | 5.6 | 8.000 | | 13.600 | Q |
| 10 | Zhang Yihan (CHN) | 5.5 | 8.033 | | 13.533 | R1 |
| 11 | Julia Soares (BRA) | 5.4 | 8.100 | | 13.500 | R2 |
| 12 | Jade Barbosa (BRA) | 5.5 | 8.000 | | 13.500 | – |
| 13 | Angela Andreoli (ITA) | 5.8 | 7.700 | | 13.500 | – |
| 14 | Zhou Yaqin (CHN) | 5.5 | 7.966 | | 13.466 | – |
| 15 | Ellie Black (CAN) | 5.6 | 7.900 | 0.100 | 13.400 | R3 |
