= Gymnastics at the 2024 Summer Olympics – Women's balance beam =

Women's balance beam at the Games of the XXXIII Olympiad
- Olympic artistic gymnastics
- Venue: Accor Arena
- Dates: 28 July 2024 (qualifying); 5 August 2024 (final)
- Competitors: 8 from 5 nations
- Winning score: 14.366

Medalists
1st place, gold medalist(s)		Alice D'Amato	Italy
2nd place, silver medalist(s)		Zhou Yaqin	China
3rd place, bronze medalist(s)		Manila Esposito	Italy

The women's balance beam event at the 2024 Summer Olympics was held 28 July and 5 August 2024 at the Accor Arena (referred to as the Bercy Arena due to IOC sponsorship rules). 78 gymnasts from 35 nations (of the 95 total gymnasts) competed on balance beam in the qualifying round.

== Background ==
This was the 20th appearance of the event, after making its debut at the 1952 Summer Olympics. Reigning champion Guan Chenchen retired in October of 2022.

== Qualification ==
A National Olympic Committee (NOC) could enter up to 5 qualified gymnasts. A total of 95 quota places are allocated to women's artistic gymnastics.

The 12 teams that qualified were able to send 5 gymnasts in the team competition, for a total of 60 of the 95 quota places. The top three teams at the 2022 World Artistic Gymnastics Championships (the United States, Great Britain, and Canada) and the top nine teams (excluding those already qualified) at the 2023 World Artistic Gymnastics Championships (China, Brazil, Italy, the Netherlands, France, Japan, Australia, Romania, and South Korea) earned team qualification places.

The remaining 35 quota places are awarded individually. Each gymnast can only earn one place. These places are filled through various criteria based on the 2023 World Championships, the 2024 FIG Artistic Gymnastics World Cup series, continental championships, a reallocation guarantee and a Tripartite Commission invitation.

Each of the 95 qualified gymnasts are eligible for the balance beam competition, but many gymnasts do not compete in each of the apparatus events.

== Competition format ==
The top eight qualifiers in the qualification phase (limit two per NOC) advanced to the apparatus final. The finalists performed on the balance beam again. Qualification scores were then ignored, with only final round scores counting.

== Schedule ==
Date	Time	Round	Subdivision
28 July	09:30	Qualification	Subdivision 1
28 July	11:40	Qualification	Subdivision 2
28 July	14:50	Qualification	Subdivision 3
28 July	18:00	Qualification	Subdivision 4
28 July	21:10	Qualification	Subdivision 5
5 August	12:35	Final	–
All times are Central European Summer Time (UTC+02:00)

== Results ==
=== Qualifying ===
The gymnasts who ranked in the top eight qualified for the final round. In a case where more than two gymnasts from the same NOC were in the top eight, the last ranked among them would not qualify to final round. The next-best ranked gymnast would qualify instead.

Rank	Gymnast	D Score	E Score	Pen.	Total	Qual.
1	Zhou Yaqin (CHN)	6.6	8.266		14.866	Q
2	Simone Biles (USA)	6.4	8.333		14.733	Q
3	Rebeca Andrade (BRA)	6.1	8.400		14.500	Q
4	Sunisa Lee (USA)	6.0	8.033		14.033	Q
5	Sabrina Voinea (ROU)	6.1	7.900		14.000	Q
6	Manila Esposito (ITA)	5.6	8.366		13.966	Q
7	Alice D'Amato (ITA)	5.6	8.266		13.866	Q
8	Júlia Soares (BRA)	5.6	8.200		13.800	Q
9	Sanne Wevers (NED)	5.6	8.166		13.766	R1
10	Marine Boyer (FRA)	5.8	7.966		13.766	R2
11	Luo Huan (CHN)	6.2	7.533		13.733	R3

Reserves

The reserves for the balance beam event final were:

1. Sanne Wevers (NED)
2. Marine Boyer (FRA)
3. Luo Huan (CHN)

=== Final ===
Rank	Gymnast	D Score	E Score	Pen.	Total
1st place, gold medalist(s)	Alice D'Amato (ITA)	5.8	8.566		14.366
2nd place, silver medalist(s)	Zhou Yaqin (CHN)	6.6	7.500		14.100
3rd place, bronze medalist(s)	Manila Esposito (ITA)	5.8	8.200		14.000
4	Rebeca Andrade (BRA)	5.7	8.233		13.933
5	Simone Biles (USA)	6.2	7.200	0.300	13.100
6	Sunisa Lee (USA)	6.2	6.900		13.100
7	Júlia Soares (BRA)	5.3	7.033		12.333
8	Sabrina Voinea (ROU)	5.8	5.933		11.733
