= Gymnastics at the 2024 Summer Olympics – Women's artistic individual all-around =

Women's artistic individual all-around at the Games of the XXXIII Olympiad
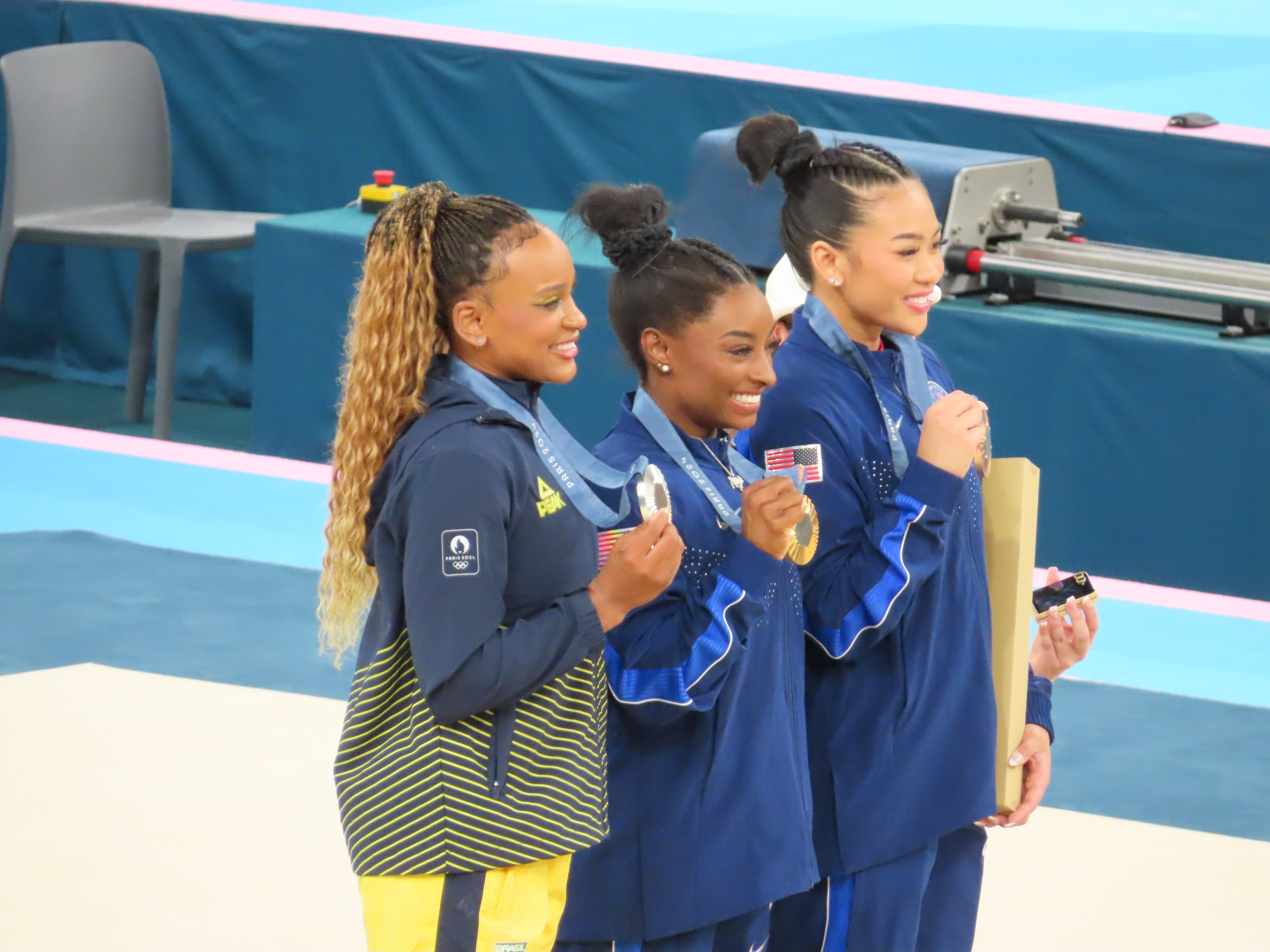
- Andrade, Biles, and Lee on the medal podium
- Venue: Accor Arena
- Dates: 28 July 2024 (qualifying); 1 August 2024 (final)
- Competitors: 24 from 15 nations

Medalists
1st place, gold medalist(s)		Simone Biles	United States
2nd place, silver medalist(s)		Rebeca Andrade	Brazil
3rd place, bronze medalist(s)		Sunisa Lee	United States

The women's artistic individual all-around event at the 2024 Summer Olympics was scheduled to take place on 28 July and 1 August 2024 at the Accor Arena (referred to as the Bercy Arena due to IOC sponsorship rules). 60 gymnasts from 32 nations (of the 95 total gymnasts) competed in the all-around in the qualifying round.

== Background ==
This was the 19th appearance of the women's individual all-around. The first individual all-around competition was held in 1952 and has been held at every edition since. For the first time in Olympic history, two former all-around champions competed in the final: Simone Biles (2016) and Sunisa Lee (2020).

== Qualification ==
A National Olympic Committee (NOC) could enter up to 5 qualified gymnasts. A total of 95 quota places are allocated to women's artistic gymnastics.

The 12 teams that qualified were able to send 5 gymnasts in the team competition, for a total of 60 of the 95 quota places. The top three teams at the 2022 World Artistic Gymnastics Championships (the United States, Great Britain, and Canada) and the top nine teams (excluding those already qualified) at the 2023 World Artistic Gymnastics Championships (China, Brazil, Italy, the Netherlands, France, Japan, Australia, Romania, and South Korea) earned team qualification places.

The remaining 35 quota places are awarded individually. Each gymnast can only earn one place. These places are filled through various criteria based on the 2023 World Championships, the 2024 FIG Artistic Gymnastics World Cup series, continental championships, a reallocation guarantee and a Tripartite Commission invitation.

Only gymnasts competing in all four apparatus exercises in the qualifying round were ranked for the individual all-around qualifying.

== Competition format ==
The top 24 qualifiers in the qualification phase (limit two per NOC) advanced to the all-around final. The finalists performed an additional exercise on each apparatus. Qualification scores were then ignored, with only final round scores counting. Scoring was according to the FIG Code of Points.

== Schedule ==
Date	Time	Round	Subdivision
28 July	09:30	Qualification	Subdivision 1
28 July	11:40	Qualification	Subdivision 2
28 July	14:50	Qualification	Subdivision 3
28 July	18:00	Qualification	Subdivision 4
28 July	21:10	Qualification	Subdivision 5
1 August	18:15	Final	–
All times are Central European Summer Time (UTC+02:00)

== Results ==
=== Qualifying ===
The gymnasts who ranked in the top twenty-four qualified for the final round. In a case where more than two gymnasts from the same NOC were in the top twenty-four, the last ranked among them would not qualify to final round. The next-best ranked gymnast would qualify instead.

Rank	Gymnast	Vault (gymnastics)	Uneven bars	Balance beam	Floor (gymnastics)	Total	Qual.
1	Simone Biles (USA)	15.800	14.433	14.733	14.600	59.566	Q
2	Rebeca Andrade (BRA)	14.900	14.400	14.500	13.900	57.700	Q
3	Sunisa Lee (USA)	14.133	14.866	14.033	13.100	56.132	Q
4	Jordan Chiles (USA)	14.333	14.266	13.600	13.866	56.065	–
5	Kaylia Nemour (ALG)	14.000	15.600	13.200	13.166	55.966	Q
6	Manila Esposito (ITA)	14.133	14.166	13.966	13.633	55.898	Q
7	Alice D'Amato (ITA)	13.200	14.666	13.866	13.700	55.432	Q
8	Qiu Qiyuan (CHN)	13.233	15.066	13.533	13.166	54.998	Q
9	Ellie Black (CAN)	14.100	14.166	13.100	13.400	54.766	Q
10	Rina Kishi (JPN)	14.033	13.566	13.500	13.600	54.699	Q
11	Flávia Saraiva (BRA)	14.100	13.800	13.133	13.166	54.199	Q
12	Ou Yushan (CHN)	13.000	13.966	13.333	13.666	53.965	Q
13	Elisa Iorio (ITA)	13.766	14.366	12.966	12.800	53.898	–
14	Ruby Pass (AUS)	13.800	13.900	13.300	12.866	53.866	Q
15	Helen Kevric (GER)	14.066	14.600	12.133	13.066	53.865	Q
16	Ana Bărbosu (ROU)	13.800	12.600	13.533	13.600	53.533	Q
17	Haruka Nakamura (JPN)	13.066	13.600	13.600	13.266	53.532	Q
18	Filipa Martins (POR)	14.133	13.800	12.600	12.633	53.166	Q
19	Mana Okamura (JPN)	13.033	13.266	13.633	13.200	53.132	–
20	Jade Barbosa (BRA)	13.733	12.733	13.100	13.500	53.066	–
21	Naomi Visser (NED)	13.233	14.266	13.300	12.233	53.032	Q
22	Bettina Lili Czifra (HUN)	12.966	13.933	13.233	12.600	52.732	Q
23	Amalia Ghigoarță (ROU)	13.000	13.066	13.266	13.333	52.665	Q
24	Georgia-Mae Fenton (GBR)	13.833	12.833	13.500	12.466	52.632	Q
25	Sarah Voss (GER)	14.000	13.466	12.233	12.866	52.565	Q
26	Ava Stewart (CAN)	13.600	13.466	12.633	12.633	52.332	Q
27	Kohane Ushioku (JPN)	13.866	12.833	12.866	12.566	52.131	–
28	Alice Kinsella (GBR)	13.933	11.900	13.433	12.733	51.999	Q
29	Aurélie Tran (CAN)	13.166	13.500	12.066	13.066	51.798	–
30	Luisa Blanco (COL)	13.466	12.833	12.766	12.633	51.698	Q
31	Lihie Raz (ISR)	13.666	12.833	12.300	12.833	51.632	R1
32	Lieke Wevers (NED)	13.300	12.566	13.366	12.300	51.532	R2
33	Mélanie de Jesus dos Santos (FRA)	14.200	12.233	12.366	12.700	51.499	R3
34	Georgia-Rose Brown (NZL)	13.233	13.666	12.333	12.233	51.465	R4

Reserves

The reserves for the individual all-around event final were:

1. Lihie Raz (ISR)
2. Lieke Wevers (NED)
3. Mélanie de Jesus dos Santos (FRA)
4. Georgia-Rose Brown (NZL)

Only two gymnasts from each country may advance to the all-around final. Gymnasts who did not qualify for the final because of the quota, but had high enough scores to do so were:

- Jordan Chiles (USA)
- Elisa Iorio (ITA)
- Mana Okamura (JPN)
- Jade Barbosa (BRA)
- Kohane Ushioku (JPN)
- Aurélie Tran (CAN)

=== Final ===
Rank	Gymnast	Vault (gymnastics)	Uneven bars	Balance beam	Floor (gymnastics)	Total
1st place, gold medalist(s)	Simone Biles (USA)	15.766	13.733	14.566	15.066	59.131
2nd place, silver medalist(s)	Rebeca Andrade (BRA)	15.100	14.666	14.133	14.033	57.932
3rd place, bronze medalist(s)	Sunisa Lee (USA)	13.933	14.866	14.000	13.666	56.465
4	Alice D'Amato (ITA)	14.000	14.800	14.033	13.500	56.333
5	Kaylia Nemour (ALG)	14.033	15.533	13.233	13.100	55.899
6	Ellie Black (CAN)	14.100	14.066	12.933	13.700	54.799
7	Qiu Qiyuan (CHN)	13.133	13.900	14.500	13.233	54.766
8	Helen Kevric (GER)	13.866	14.466	13.400	12.866	54.598
9	Flávia Saraiva (BRA)	13.633	13.900	14.266	12.233	54.032
10	Naomi Visser (NED)	12.966	14.266	13.333	13.400	53.965
11	Rina Kishi (JPN)	13.766	13.833	13.133	13.233	53.965
12	Alice Kinsella (GBR)	13.800	14.133	13.033	12.833	53.799
13	Ruby Pass (AUS)	13.633	13.733	13.466	12.966	53.798
14	Manila Esposito (ITA)	13.866	12.800	14.200	12.733	53.599
15	Haruka Nakamura (JPN)	12.833	13.933	13.700	12.633	53.099
16	Ou Yushan (CHN)	12.966	13.966	14.033	11.933	52.898
17	Ana Bărbosu (ROU)	14.000	12.433	12.466	13.566	52.465
18	Georgia-Mae Fenton (GBR)	13.633	13.800	11.300	13.033	51.766
19	Ava Stewart (CAN)	13.333	12.633	13.166	12.500	51.632
20	Filipa Martins (POR)	12.500	13.566	12.700	12.466	51.232
21	Bettina Lili Czifra (HUN)	12.966	13.900	11.400	12.833	51.099
22	Amalia Ghigoarță (ROU)	13.100	12.566	11.900	13.166	50.732
23	Luisa Blanco (COL)	13.500	11.133	12.866	12.700	50.199
24	Sarah Voss (GER)	12.500	12.333	12.300	12.866	49.999
