= Gymnastics at the 2022 Asian Games – Women's artistic individual all-around =

Women's individual all-around at the 2022 Asian Games
- Venue: Huanglong Gymnasium
- Date: 25–27 September 2023
- Competitors: 28 from 10 nations

Medalists
gold medal	Zuo Tong	China
silver medal	Mana Okamura	Japan
bronze medal	Kim Su-jong	North Korea

The women's artistic individual all-around competition at the 2022 Asian Games was held on 27 September 2023 at Huanglong Sports Centre Gymnasium.

== Schedule ==
All times are China Standard Time (UTC+08:00)

Date	Time	Event
Monday, 25 September 2023	10:00	Qualification
Wednesday, 27 September 2023	15:00	Final

== Results ==
Legend

- DNS — Did not start

=== Qualification ===
Rank	Athlete	Vault (gymnastics)	Uneven bars	Balance beam	Floor (gymnastics)	Total
1	Zhang Jin (CHN)	13.900	13.533	13.600	13.233	54.266
2	Zuo Tong (CHN)	13.033	13.933	12.733	13.166	52.865
3	Zhang Xinyi (CHN)	13.266	13.533	12.500	13.200	52.499
4	Mana Okamura (JPN)	13.000	12.933	13.366	13.133	52.432
5	Kim Su-jong (PRK)	12.666	13.433	13.166	13.100	52.365
6	An Chang-ok (PRK)	13.866	13.933	11.900	12.566	52.265
7	Kim Son-hyang (PRK)	13.433	12.733	13.100	12.933	52.199
8	Kohane Ushioku (JPN)	13.633	12.833	12.433	13.266	52.165
9	Misaki Masui (JPN)	13.133	12.100	13.266	12.700	51.199
10	Ting Hua-tien (TPE)	12.733	11.566	13.866	12.500	50.665
11	Mikako Serita (JPN)	12.966	13.533	12.100	10.966	49.565
12	Aida Bauyrzhanova (KAZ)	12.366	12.000	12.033	12.266	48.665
13	Lai Pin-ju (TPE)	12.800	11.566	12.166	11.866	48.398
14	Lin Yi-chen (TPE)	12.666	11.433	11.600	11.800	47.499
15	Nadine Joy Nathan (SGP)	12.700	11.733	12.600	10.433	47.466
16	Lim Su-min (KOR)	12.666	10.200	11.533	13.033	47.432
17	An Yeon-jeong (KOR)	11.466	11.333	12.200	12.400	47.399
18	Kaitlyn Lim (SGP)	12.333	10.366	12.466	11.366	46.531
19	Yun Bo-eun (KOR)	12.966	12.066	10.566	10.933	46.531
20	Oh So-seon (KOR)	12.266	10.400	11.433	11.900	45.999
21	Amina Khalimarden (KAZ)	12.133	10.000	10.533	11.833	44.499
22	Sasiwimon Mueangphuan (THA)	11.866	8.966	10.966	12.466	44.264
23	Pranati Nayak (IND)	12.866	10.300	11.233	9.833	44.232
24	Shandy Poh (SGP)	11.666	9.900	11.266	11.100	43.932
25	Kursten Lopez (PHI)	11.900	9.033	11.266	11.366	43.565
26	Ananya Patanakul (THA)	12.366	9.433	9.066	11.466	42.331
27	Emma Yap (SGP)	12.033	7.466	9.066	12.233	40.798
28	Thantida Ruecker (THA)	11.433	7.266	8.300	10.400	37.399

=== Final ===
Rank	Athlete	Vault (gymnastics)	Uneven bars	Balance beam	Floor (gymnastics)	Total
1st place, gold medalist(s)	Zuo Tong (CHN)	12.833	13.733	13.833	13.166	53.565
2nd place, silver medalist(s)	Mana Okamura (JPN)	12.866	13.033	13.933	13.066	52.898
3rd place, bronze medalist(s)	Kim Su-jong (PRK)	12.300	13.000	13.200	12.966	51.466
4	Zhang Jin (CHN)	13.033	10.100	13.900	13.866	50.899
5	Ting Hua-tien (TPE)	12.366	12.300	13.533	12.100	50.299
6	An Chang-ok (PRK)	13.500	13.633	12.033	11.100	50.266
7	Lim Su-min (KOR)	12.700	11.100	12.433	12.933	49.166
8	An Yeon-jeong (KOR)	12.733	11.566	12.533	12.133	48.965
9	Lai Pin-ju (TPE)	12.886	11.233	12.966	11.766	48.831
10	Aida Bauyrzhanova (KAZ)	11.600	11.100	11.933	12.900	47.533
11	Sasiwimon Mueangphuan (THA)	12.366	9.700	11.133	12.533	45.732
12	Kaitlyn Lim (SGP)	12.500	9.566	11.900	11.500	45.466
13	Kursten Lopez (PHI)	12.166	10.033	11.366	10.766	44.331
14	Amina Khalimarden (KAZ)	12.300	10.466	10.800	10.466	44.032
15	Ananya Patanakul (THA)	12.733	10.633	9.166	11.433	43.965
16	Shandy Poh (SGP)	11.566	8.433	10.833	11.266	42.098
—	Kohane Ushioku (JPN)	DNS	DNS	DNS	DNS	DNS
