= Lihie Raz =

Israeli artistic gymnast (born 2003)

- ליהיא רז
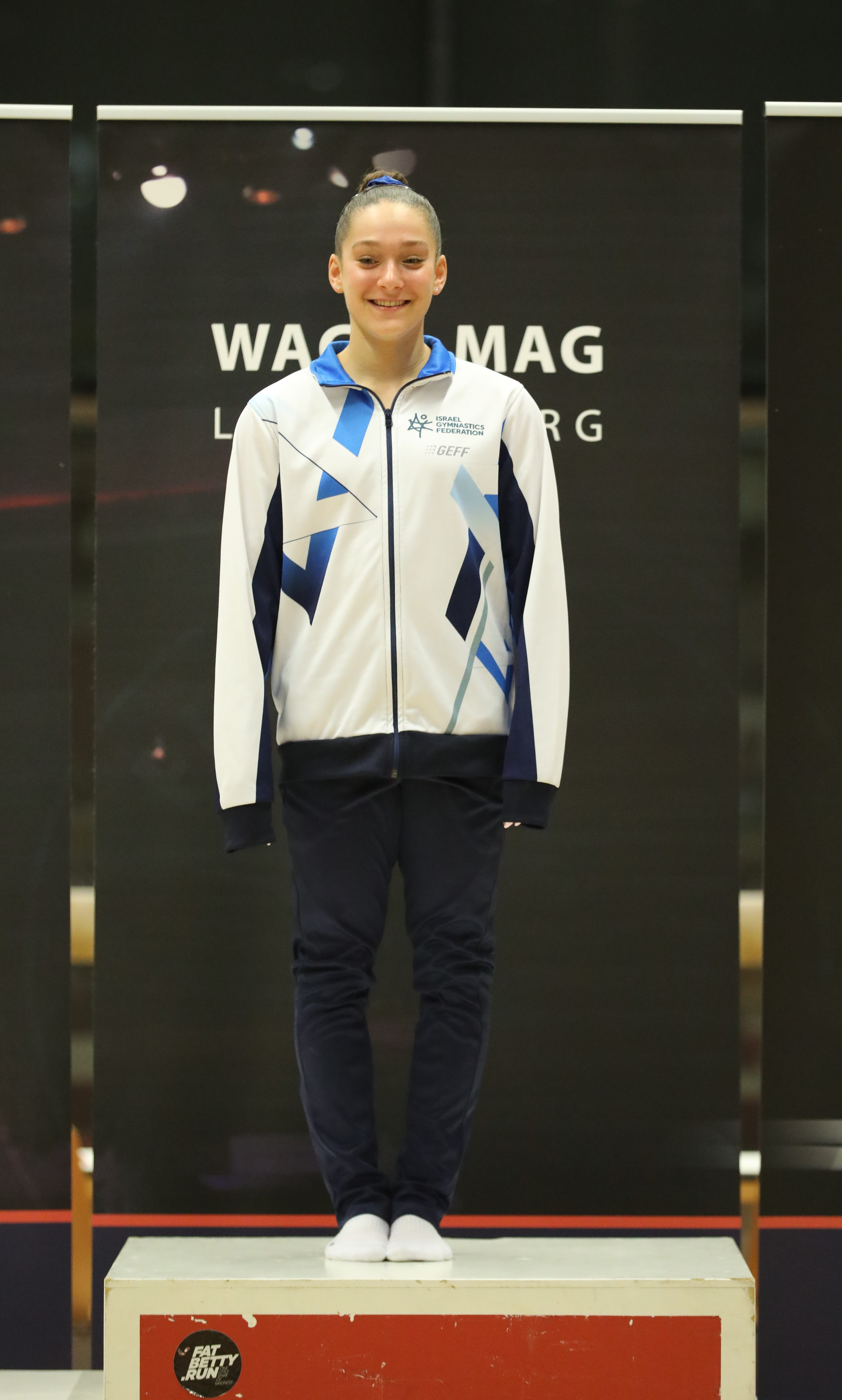
- Raz at the 2023 Luxembourg Open

Personal information
- Born: 14 September 2003 (age 22) Manhattan, New York, U.S.

Gymnastics career
- Discipline: Women's artistic gymnastics
- Country represented: Israel
- College team: Michigan Wolverines (2027-2030)
- Club: Migvanim Ramat HaSharon
- Head coach: Moran Klefner
- Assistant coaches: Shir Solomon, Ilan Gazit
Medal record
Women's artistic gymnastics
Representing Israel
| Event | 1st | 2nd | 3rd |
|---|---|---|---|
| Apparatus World Cup | 0 | 1 | 0 |
| World Challenge Cup | 1 | 0 | 0 |
| Total | 1 | 1 | 0 |
European Championships
| Bronze medal – third place | 2020 Mersin | Floor exercise |

Lihie Raz (Hebrew: ליהיא רז; born 14 September 2003) is an Israeli Olympic artistic gymnast. Born in the United States, she represents Israel internationally. She won the bronze medal on the floor exercise at the 2020 European Championships, which was Israel's first medal at the European Women's Artistic Gymnastics Championships. She is also the 2019 and 2021 Israeli all-around champion. She represented Israel at the 2020 Summer Olympics and finished 59th in the all-around during qualifications, but did not advance to any finals. Raz represented Israel at the 2024 Paris Olympics. In the qualification round, she came in 16th in vault, and 31st in the all-around. She was the first reserve competitor for the all-around final. In 2026, Raz committed to represent the Michigan Wolverines in NCAA gymnastics.

== Early life ==
Raz was born in Manhattan in New York City to Israeli parents Tami and chef Nitzan Raz, is Jewish, and immigrated with them to Israel when she was three months old. She grew up in Ramat HaSharon, a town just north of Tel Aviv. She trained as an elite gymnast while attending high school.

== Career ==
Raz began gymnastics when she was six years old under coach Moran Klefner, who is still coaching her today.

=== 2017–18; Maccabiah Games gold ===
At the 2017 Maccabiah Games in Israel, Raz made her international debut. She won the gold medal in the junior floor exercise, with a score of 11.775.

At the 2018 Israeli Cup, she won the junior all-around bronze medal. Then at the 2018 Austrian Team Open in Linz, Raz helped the Israeli team place 14th, and individually, she placed 17th in the all-around. At the Youth Olympic Games Qualifier in Baku, Azerbaijan, she placed 18th in the floor exercise and 26th in the all-around, and did not qualify for the 2018 Summer Youth Olympics. At the 2018 Junior Israeli Championships, she placed fifth in the all-around.

On July 14, 2018, in Izvorani, Romania, Raz competed with the Israeli team in a friendly meet against Romania, and placed ninth in the all-around. She competed for Team Israel at the 2018 Junior European Championships in Glasgow, Scotland, where the Israeli team finished 23rd. She placed ninth with the Israeli team at the 2018 Olympic Hopes Cup in Liberec, Czech Republic. Then at the 2018 Voronin Cup in Moscow, Russia, she placed 10th in the all-around, fourth on vault, sixth on the floor exercise, and eighth on the uneven bars and balance beam.

=== 2019; Israeli national champion ===
Raz made her senior international debut at the 2019 Austrian Team Open in Linz, where she won a silver medal in the vault behind Dutch Olympian Eythora Thorsdottir, and placed eighth in the all-around and fourth with the Israeli team. Then at the 2019 Stella Zakharova Cup in Kyiv, Ukraine, she won the bronze medal on the floor exercise behind Ukrainian Olympian Angelina Radivilova and Malaysian Farah Ann Abdul Hadi, and placed fourth in the vault.

She placed sixth in the vault final at the 2019 Osijek World Challenge Cup in Croatia. At the 2019 Israeli Championships, she won her first national all-around title with a total score of 46.350, as she also won gold medals in the uneven bars and the floor exercise, and a silver medal in the vault. Then at the 2019 World Championships in Stuttgart, Germany, she finished 82nd in the all-around which qualified her for the 2020 Olympics.

=== 2020–21; European Championships bronze and Olympics ===
At the 2020 European Championships in Mersin, Turkey, Raz won the bronze medal in the floor exercise event final with a score of 12.750 behind Turkey's Göksu Üçtaş Şanlı and Romania's Olympic bronze medalist Larisa Iordache. This made her Israel's first-ever medalist at the European Women's Artistic Gymnastics Championships. Additionally, she was the third reserve for the vault final, after finishing 11th in the qualification round.

In February 2021, Raz won the bronze medal in the all-around, the gold medal in the vault, and the bronze medal in the all-around at the 2021 Israeli Winter Cup. She won a bronze medal in the vault at the 2021 German Olympic Trials in Munich behind German national champion Sarah Voss. She then qualified for the all-around final at the 2021 European Championships in Basel, Switzerland, and finished 22nd with a total score of 47.499. She won her second national all-around title at the 2021 Israeli Championships.

Raz then represented Israel at the 2020 Summer Olympics. She finished 15th in the vault with a score of 13.899, and 59th in the all-around during the qualification round with a total score of 50.399.

=== 2022; Maccabiah Games gold ===
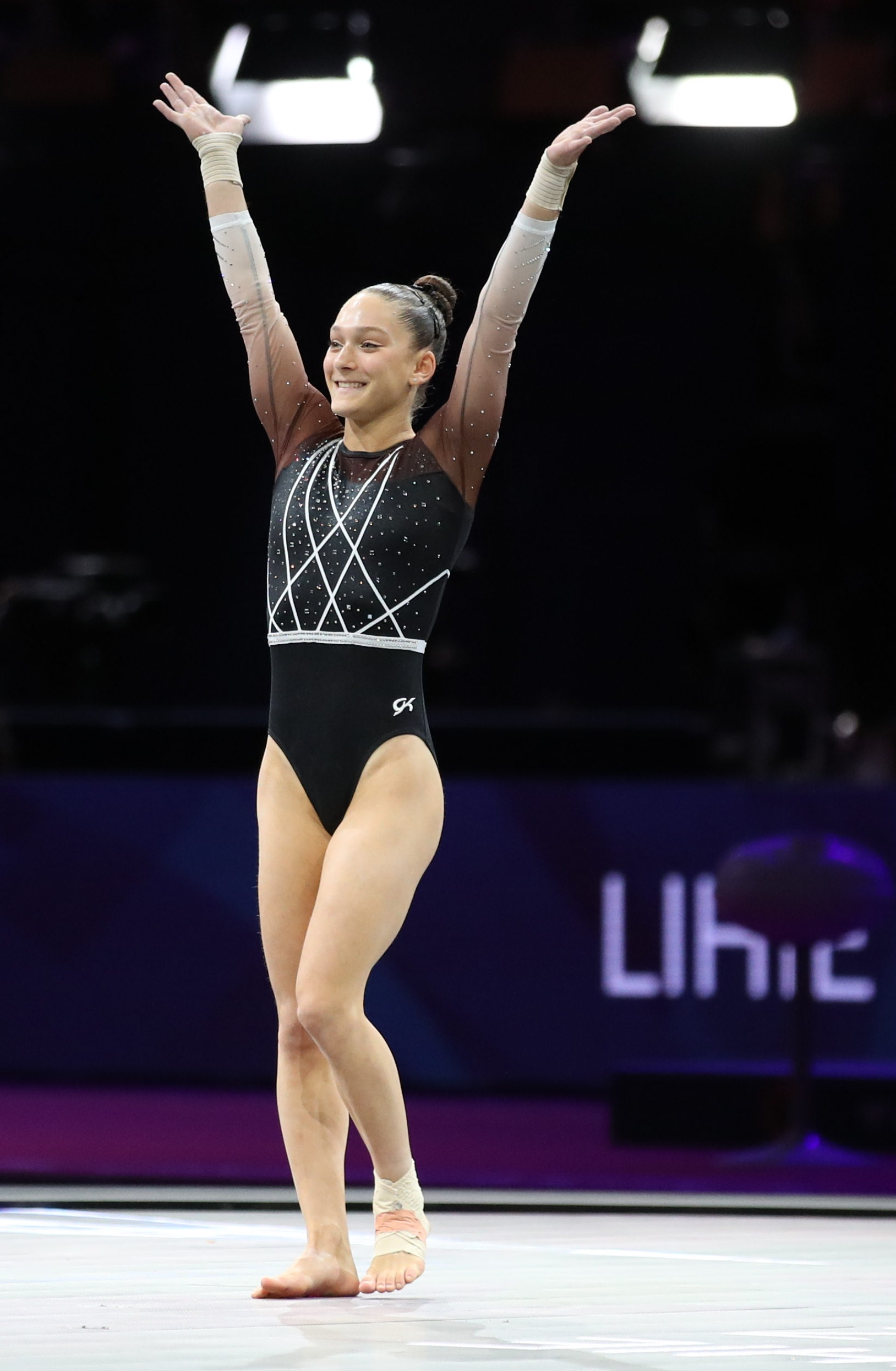
Raz at the 2022 European Championships

Raz finished sixth on the vault and seventh on the balance beam at the 2022 Varna World Challenge Cup in Bulgaria. Then at the 2022 Koper World Challenge Cup in Slovenia, she finished fourth on floor exercise, and seventh on uneven bars and balance beam. At the 2022 Maccabiah Games in Israel, at 18 years old she helped the Israeli team win gold, and individually, she swept the gold medals in the women's open events, winning six in all. In July she won the 2022 Israeli All-Around Championships in Tel Aviv. She qualified for the vault final at the 2022 European Championships in Munich, Germany, and finished seventh.

She was initially the first reserve for the vault final at the 2022 World Championships in Liverpool, United Kingdom. After Jessica Gadirova withdrew due to an ankle injury, Raz competed in the final and placed eighth.

=== 2023; Luxembourg Open gold ===
Raz began the season at the 2023 Luxembourg Open, and won the gold medal in the vault final. The Israeli team finished third behind Italy and Spain, and Raz placed sixth in the all-around. She also finished fifth on floor exercise, seventh on uneven bars, and ninth on balance beam. She competed at the 2023 European Championships but did not qualify for any finals.

At the 2023 Tel Aviv World Challenge Cup, Raz finished sixth on vault and floor exercise, and eighth on balance beam. Then at the RomGym Trophy in Bucharest, Romania, she placed sixth in the all-around and fifth in the uneven bars final. She finished 48th in the all-around at the 2023 World Championships in Antwerp, Belgium, with a total score of 49.999. Raz earned an individual berth as the 13th-highest placing eligible gymnast.

=== 2024; Paris Olympics ===
Raz represented Israel at the 2024 Paris Olympics. She came in 16th in the Women's vault, and 31st in the Women's All-Around qualification with a score of 51.632, just missing the final that had a cutoff of 51.698.

== Competitive history ==
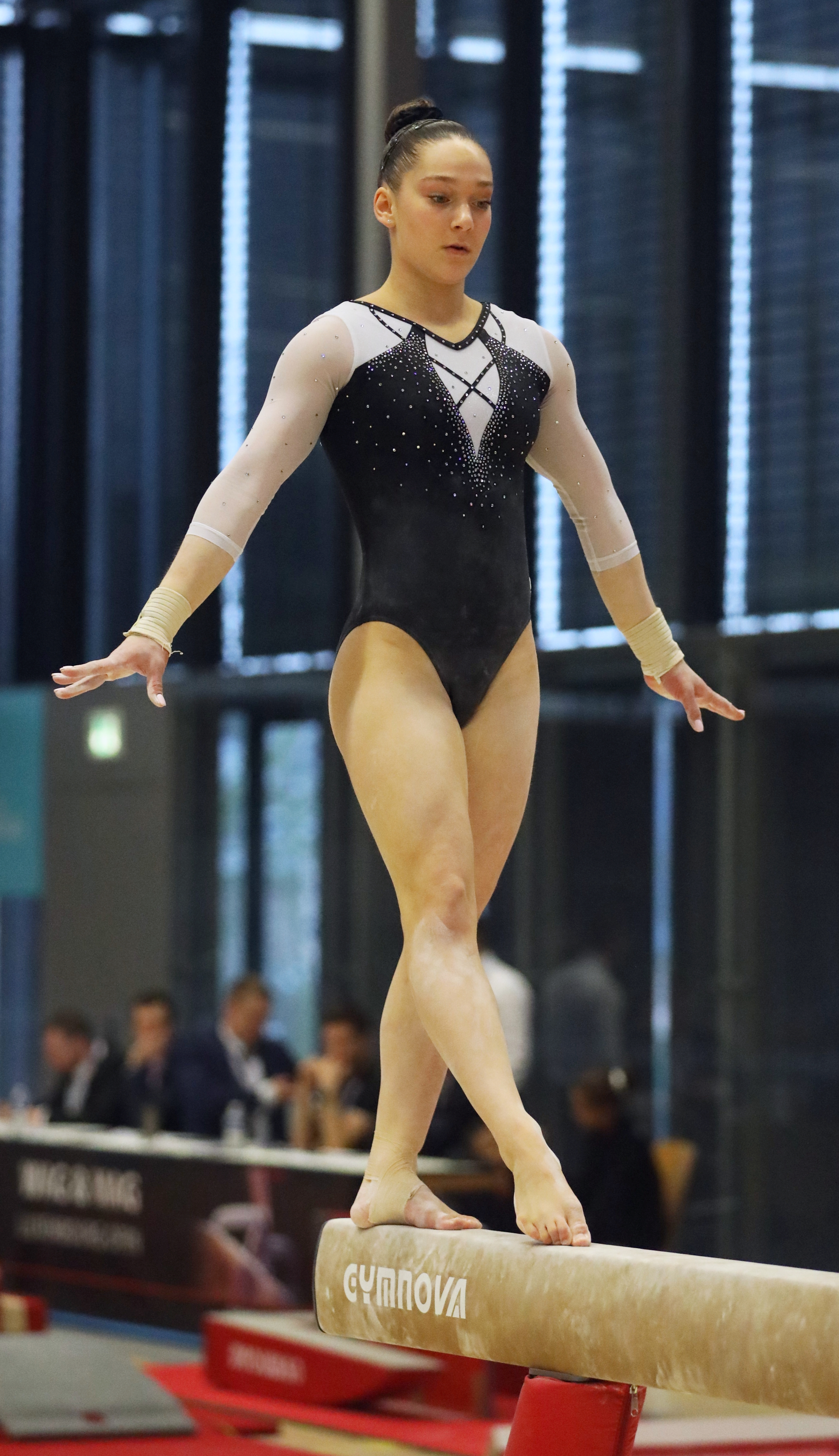
Raz at the 2023 Luxembourg Open

| Year | Event | Team | AA | VT | UB | BB | FX |
Junior
| 2017 | Maccabiah Games | | 9 | | | | 1st place, gold medalist(s) |
| 2018 | Israeli Winter Cup | | 3rd place, bronze medalist(s) | | | | |
| 2018 | Austrian Team Open | 14 | 17 | | | | |
| 2018 | Youth Olympic Games Qualifier | | 26 | | | | |
| 2018 | Israeli Championships | | 5 | | | | |
| 2018 | Izvorani Friendly | 2nd place, silver medalist(s) | 9 | | | | |
| 2018 | European Championships | 23 | | | | | |
| 2018 | Olympic Hopes Cup | 9 | 24 | | | | |
| 2018 | Voronin Cup | | 10 | 4 | 8 | 8 | 6 |
Senior
| 2019 | Austrian Team Open | 4 | 8 | | | | |
| 2019 | Stella Zakharova Cup | 8 | 10 | 4 | | | 3rd place, bronze medalist(s) |
| 2019 | Osijek World Challenge Cup | | | 6 | | | |
| 2019 | Israeli Championships | | 1st place, gold medalist(s) | | | | |
| 2019 | World Championships | | 82 | | | | |
2020
| 2020 | European Championships | | | R3 | | | 3rd place, bronze medalist(s) |
| 2021 | Israeli Winter Cup | | 3rd place, bronze medalist(s) | | | | |
| 2021 | European Championships | | 22 | | | | |
| 2021 | Israeli Championships | | 1st place, gold medalist(s) | | | | |
| 2021 | Olympic Games | | 59 | | | | |
| 2022 | Varna World Challenge Cup | | | 6 | | 7 | |
| 2022 | Koper World Challenge Cup | | | | 7 | 7 | 4 |
| 2022 | Maccabiah Games | 1st place, gold medalist(s) | 1st place, gold medalist(s) | 1st place, gold medalist(s) | 1st place, gold medalist(s) | 1st place, gold medalist(s) | 1st place, gold medalist(s) |
| 2022 | European Championships | | | 7 | | | |
| 2022 | World Championships | | | 8 | | | |
| 2023 | Luxembourg Open | 3rd place, bronze medalist(s) | 6 | 1st place, gold medalist(s) | 7 | 9 | 5 |
| 2023 | Tel Aviv World Challenge Cup | | | 6 | | 8 | 6 |
| 2023 | RomGym Trophy | | 6 | | 5 | | |
| 2023 | World Championships | | 48 | | | | |
2024
| 2024 | Olympic Games | | R1 | | | | |
| 2025 | Cottbus World Cup | | | | | | 2nd place, silver medalist(s) |
| 2025 | European Championships | 12 | 19 | R1 | | | |
| 2026 | Cottbus World Cup | | | 8 | | | 4 |
| 2026 | Koper World Challenge Cup | | | 4 | | 8 | 1st place, gold medalist(s) |
| 2026 | Maccabiah Games | | 1st place, gold medalist(s) | 1st place, gold medalist(s) | 2nd place, silver medalist(s) | 1st place, gold medalist(s) | 1st place, gold medalist(s) |
| 2026 | European Championships | 17 | | | | | |

== Awards ==
Raz was selected for Forbes Israel's 30 Under 30 list for 2021.

== See also ==
- List of Jews in sports
