= Gymnastics at the 2022 Asian Games – Women's artistic team =

Women's team at the 2022 Asian Games
- Venue: Huanglong Gymnasium
- Date: 25 September 2023
- Competitors: 35 from 8 nations

Medalists
gold medal	China; Tang Xijing, Yu Linmin, Zhang Jin, Zhang Xinyi, Zuo Tong
silver medal	Japan; Misaki Masui, Mana Okamura, Mikako Serita, Kohane Ushioku
bronze medal	North Korea; An Chang-ok, Kim Son-hyang, Kim Su-jong, Ryu Mi-rae, Sim Hae-won

The women's artistic team competition at the 2022 Asian Games was held on 25 September 2023 at the Huanglong Sports Centre Gymnasium.

== Schedule ==
All times are China Standard Time (UTC+08:00)

Date	Time	Event
Monday, 25 September 2023	10:00	Final

== Results ==
Rank	Team	Vault (gymnastics)	Uneven bars	Balance beam	Floor (gymnastics)	Total
1st place, gold medalist(s)	China (CHN)	41.199	41.932	39.166	39.599	161.896
	Tang Xijing		14.466	12.833	~~12.933~~	
	Yu Linmin	14.033				
	Zhang Jin	13.900	13.533	13.600	13.233	
	Zhang Xinyi	13.266	~~13.533~~	~~12.500~~	13.200	
	Zuo Tong	~~13.033~~	13.933	12.733	13.166	
2nd place, silver medalist(s)	Japan (JPN)	39.766	39.299	39.065	39.099	157.229
	Misaki Masui	13.133	~~12.100~~	13.266	12.700	
	Mana Okamura	13.000	12.933	13.366	13.133	
	Mikako Serita	~~12.966~~	13.533	~~12.100~~	~~10.966~~	
	Kohane Ushioku	13.633	12.833	12.433	13.266	
3rd place, bronze medalist(s)	North Korea (PRK)	39.965	40.099	38.166	38.599	156.829
	An Chang-ok	13.866	13.933	11.900	12.566	
	Kim Son-hyang	13.433	12.733	13.100	12.933	
	Kim Su-jong	12.666	13.433	13.166	13.100	
	Ryu Mi-rae	~~11.666~~				
	Sim Hae-win		~~11.900~~	~~11.466~~	~~10.100~~	
4	Chinese Taipei (TPE)	38.533	34.565	37.632	36.366	147.096
	Chang Tzu-ling		~~11.233~~			
	Lai Pin-ju	12.800	11.566	12.166	11.866	
	Lin Yi-chen	~~12.666~~	11.433	~~11.600~~	~~11.800~~	
	Ting Hua-tien	12.733	11.566	13.866	12.500	
	Wu Sing-fen	13.000		11.600	12.000	
5	South Korea (KOR)	37.898	33.799	35.166	37.333	144.196
	An Yeon-jeong	~~11.466~~	11.333	12.200	12.400	
	Lim Su-min	12.666	~~10.200~~	11.533	13.033	
	Oh So-seon	12.266	10.400	11.433	11.900	
	Yun Bo-eun	12.966	12.066	~~10.566~~	~~10.933~~	
6	Kazakhstan (KAZ)	37.599	31.733	36.365	37.132	142.829
	Aida Bauyrzhanova	12.366	12.000	12.033	12.266	
	Anfissa Ivanova	12.400	9.733		11.866	
	Amina Khalimarden	~~12.133~~	10.000	~~10.533~~	~~11.833~~	
	Darya Yassinskaya	12.833		12.166	13.000	
	Korkem Yerbossynkyzy		~~8.366~~	12.166		
7	Singapore (SGP)	37.066	31.999	36.332	34.699	140.096
	Kaitlyn Lim	12.333	10.366	12.466	11.366	
	Nadine Joy Nathan	12.700	11.733	12.600	~~10.433~~	
	Shandy Poh	~~11.666~~	9.900	11.266	11.100	
	Emma Yap	12.033	~~7.466~~	~~9.066~~	12.233	
8	Thailand (THA)	35.665	25.665	28.332	34.332	123.994
	Sasiwimon Mueangphuan	11.866	8.966	10.966	12.466	
	Ananya Patanakul	12.366	9.433	9.066	11.466	
	Thantida Ruecker	11.433	7.266	8.300	10.400	
