= Alice D'Amato =

Italian artistic gymnast (born 2003)

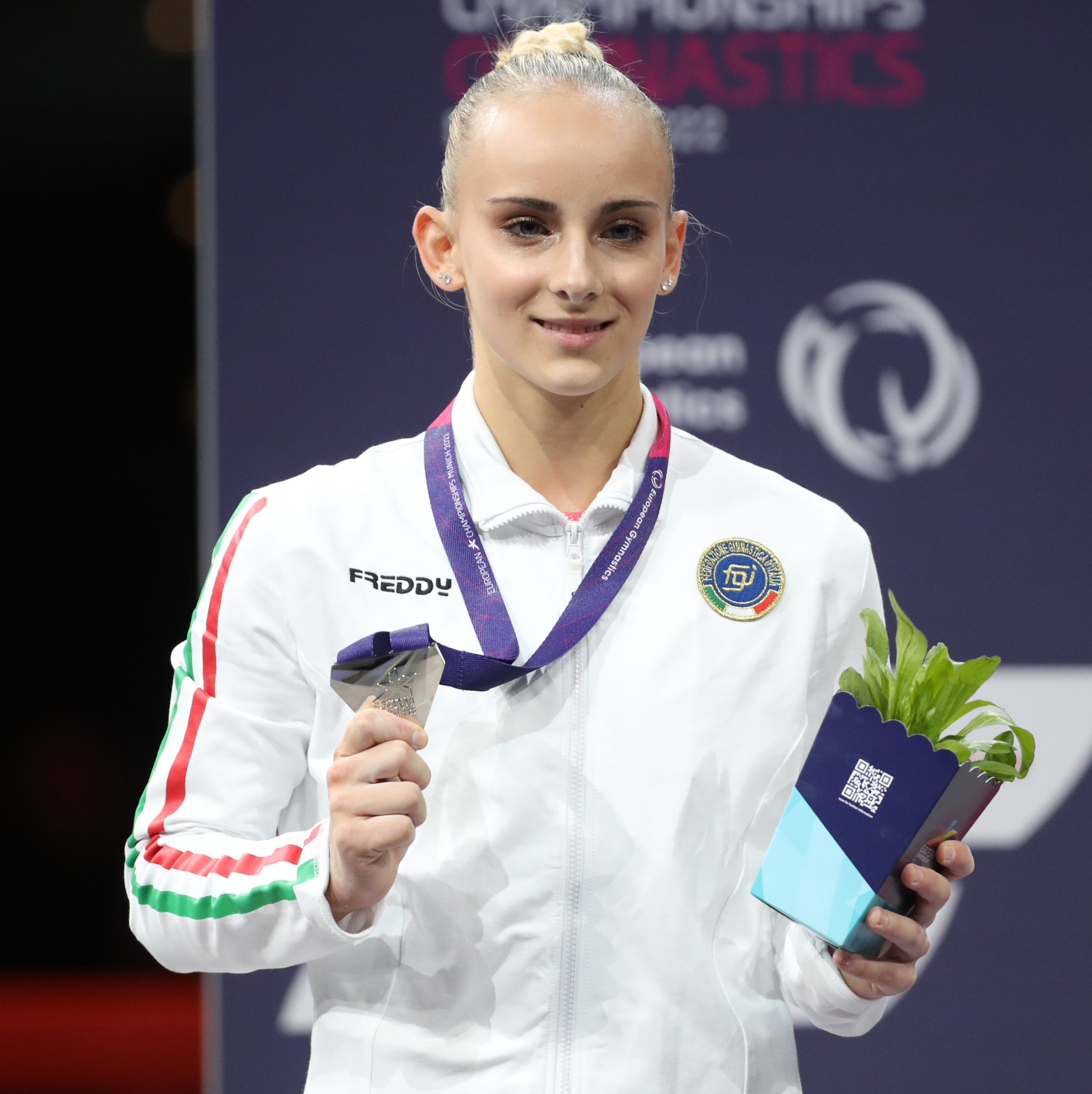
- D'Amato at the 2022 European Championships

Personal information
- Full name: Alice D'Amato
- Born: 7 February 2003 (age 23) Genoa, Italy
- Height: 1.5 m (4 ft 11 in)
- Relatives: Asia D'Amato

Gymnastics career
- Discipline: Women's artistic gymnastics
- Country represented: Italy (2015–present)
- Club: Fiamme Oro
- Gym: Brixia
- Head coach: Enrico Casella
Medal record
Women's artistic gymnastics
Representing Italy
Olympic Games
Gold medal – first place	2024 Paris	Balance beam
Silver medal – second place	2024 Paris	Team
World Championships
Bronze medal – third place	2019 Stuttgart	Team
European Championships
Gold medal – first place	2022 Munich	Team
Gold medal – first place	2023 Antalya	Uneven Bars
Gold medal – first place	2024 Rimini	Team
Gold medal – first place	2024 Rimini	Uneven Bars
Gold medal – first place	2025 Leipzig	Team
Silver medal – second place	2022 Munich	Uneven Bars
Silver medal – second place	2023 Antalya	Team
Silver medal – second place	2024 Rimini	All-Around
Bronze medal – third place	2019 Szczecin	Uneven Bars
Bronze medal – third place	2023 Antalya	All-Around
Mediterranean Games
Gold medal – first place	2022 Oran	Team
FIG World Cup Series
Event	1st	2nd	3rd
Apparatus World Cup	2	1	0
Total	2	1	0

Alice D'Amato (Italian: [aˈliːtʃe daˈmaːto]; born 7 February 2003) is an Italian artistic gymnast. She represented Italy at the 2020 and 2024 Olympic Games. She is the 2024 Olympic balance beam champion, becoming the first Italian woman to win gold at the Olympics in any gymnastics event. On the uneven bars she is the 2023 and 2024 European champion, the 2022 European silver medalist, and the 2019 European bronze medalist. Additionally, she is a two-time European all-around medalist. She was a member of the teams that won silver at the 2024 Olympic Games, bronze at the 2019 World Championships, and gold at the 2022, 2024, and 2025 European Championships. She is the twin sister of Asia D'Amato.

== Early life ==
D'Amato and her twin sister, Asia, were born in Genoa, Italy, on 7 February 2003. She and her sister began gymnastics at the age of 7 at the Andrea Doria Sports Club in Genoa, Italy. They currently train at the International Academy of Brixia in Brescia. In December 2020, Alice and Asia received the Athlete of the Year award in the Liguria region of Italy.

In September 2022, their father, Massimo, died after a long battle with cancer.

== Junior gymnastics career ==
D'Amato made her international debut at the 2015 City of Jesolo Trophy as part of Italy's Young Dreams team alongside her twin sister Asia and Giorgia Villa. D'Amato was injured for most of 2016, but competed at the Italian Event Championships where she placed first on uneven bars.

In 2017, D'Amato competed at the Mediterranean Junior Championships where she won silver in the all-around behind Elisa Iorio, and won gold in the team final. She later competed at the Italian National Championships where she placed third in the all-around and on balance beam. She later competed at the 2017 European Youth Olympic Festival alongside Elisa Iorio and Asia D'Amato. There, she helped Italy win silver behind Russia. Individually, she qualified to the uneven bars final, but was withdrawn from the final so her teammate Iorio, who would later win gold, could compete.

D'Amato competed at the 2018 Italian Championships, where she won silver on the uneven bars. In August, D'Amato competed at the 2018 European Championships alongside Asia D'Amato, Alessia Federici, Elisa Iorio, and Giorgia Villa where Italy won team gold.

== Senior gymnastics career ==
=== 2019 ===
In April, D'Amato was officially named to the team to compete at the 2019 European Championships alongside Giorgia Villa, Elisa Iorio, and Asia D'Amato. There she qualified to the all-around final and to the uneven bars final. During the all-around final, D'Amato finished in fourth place after falling off the balance beam behind Mélanie de Jesus dos Santos of France, Ellie Downie of Great Britain, and Angelina Melnikova of Russia. The following day, she won the bronze medal on the uneven bars behind Russians Anastasia Ilyankova and Melnikova. In doing so, D'Amato became the first Italian to win a European Championships medal on the apparatus.

In August, D'Amato competed at the Heerenveen Friendly, where she helped Italy win gold in the team competition ahead of the Netherlands and Norway, and individually, she finished fourth in the all-around behind Villa, Eythora Thorsdottir, and Naomi Visser. Additionally, she recorded the highest vault and uneven bars scores. On September 4 D'Amato was named to the team to compete at the 2019 World Championships in Stuttgart, Germany alongside Villa, her twin sister Asia, Iorio, and Desirée Carofiglio.

During qualifications at the World Championships, D'Amato helped Italy qualify to the team final in eighth place; as a result, Italy also qualified to the 2020 Olympic Games in Tokyo. In the team final, D'Amato helped Italy win the bronze medal—Italy's first team medal since the 1950 World Artistic Gymnastics Championships. They ended up finishing behind the United States and Russia, but ahead of China, which originally qualified to the final in second place.

=== 2020 ===
In early February, it was announced that D'Amato was selected to represent Italy at the Birmingham World Cup taking place in late March. She was later replaced by Desiree Carofiglio. However, the Birmingham World Cup was later cancelled due to the COVID-19 pandemic in the United Kingdom.

=== 2021 ===
In April, D'Amato was selected to represent Italy at the European Championships in Basel alongside Villa, Martina Maggio, and Vanessa Ferrari. During qualifications, D'Amato placed 18th in the all-around, but did not qualify to the final due to Maggio and Ferrari placing higher. She did, however, qualify for the uneven bars final. During the uneven bars final, D'Amato placed fifth.

D'Amato was named to the team to represent Italy at the 2020 Summer Olympics in Tokyo, Japan alongside her twin sister Asia, Villa (later replaced by Ferrari), and Maggio. The four qualified for the team finals and placed fourth with a total score of 163.638. She placed 20th in the individual all-around.

In October, D'Amato was selected to compete at the 2021 World Championships. She finished eighth in the all-around.

=== 2022 ===
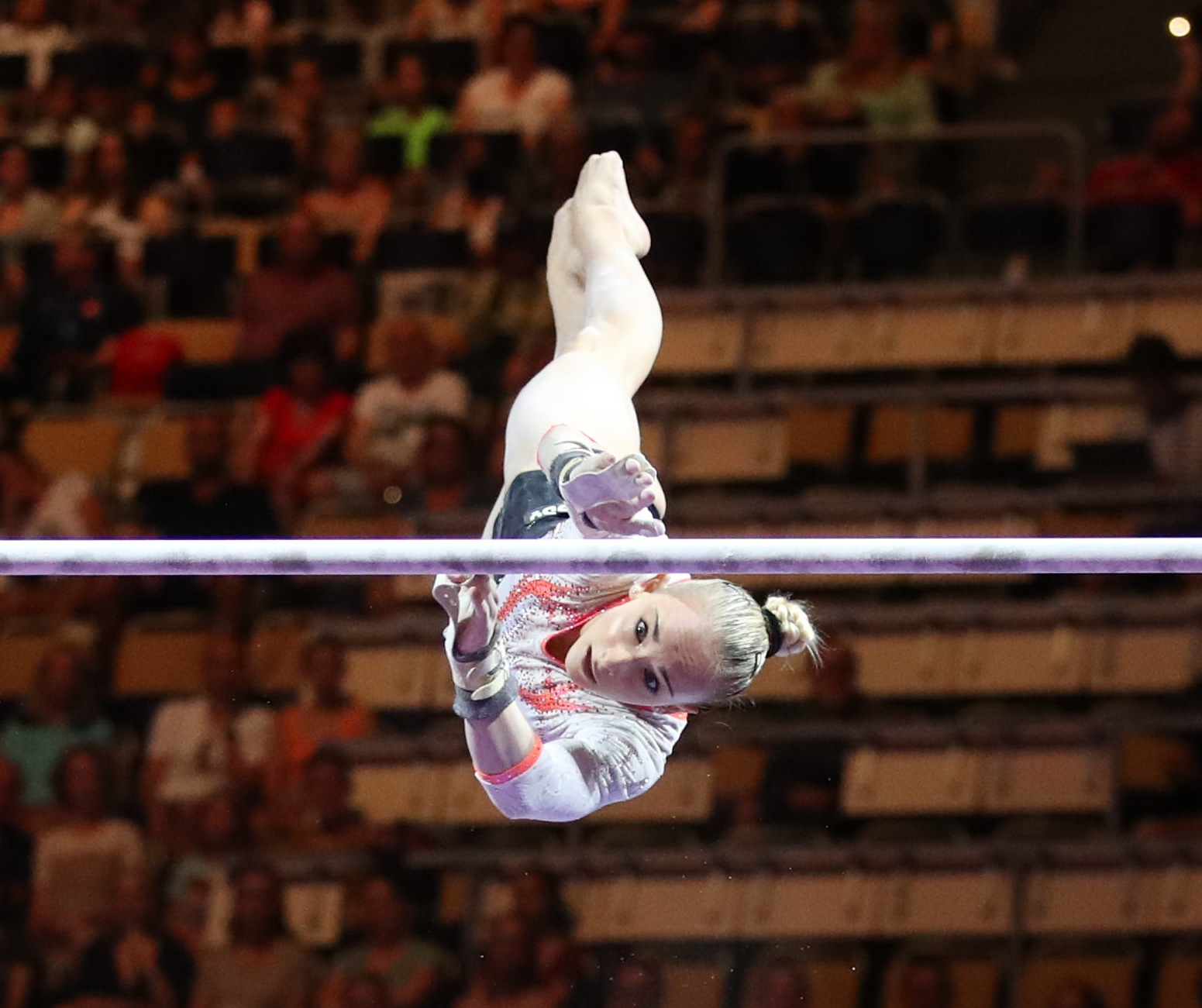
D'Amato at the 2022 European Championships

In June, D'Amato competed at the Mediterranean Games alongside Maggio, Angela Andreoli, Asia D'Amato, and Villa. Together, they won gold in the team competition, over five points ahead of second-place France. In August, D'Amato competed at the European Championships. She contributed scores on vault, uneven bars, and floor exercise towards Italy's first-place finish. During event finals, D'Amato won silver on the uneven bars behind Elisabeth Seitz of Germany.

In October, D'Amato competed at the Italian National Championships. She placed second in the all-around and on the floor exercise behind Maggio. D'Amato was later named to the team to compete at the World Championships in Liverpool alongside Maggio, Villa, Manila Esposito, Veronica Mandriota, and alternate Elisa Iorio. Together, they finished fifth as a team. Individually, D'Amato qualified for the all-around and floor exercise finals, and was the first reserve for the uneven bars final. She finished tenth in the all-around, and withdrew from the floor exercise final so compatriot Maggio could compete instead.

=== 2023 ===
D'Amato competed at the Cottbus World Cup where she finished first on uneven bars and fourth on floor exercise. She next competed at the European Championships, where she helped Italy finish second as a team. Individually, she finished third in the all-around behind Jessica Gadirova and Zsófia Kovács. During apparatus finals, she won gold on the uneven bars, becoming the first Italian to become a European champion on the event. Additionally, she placed fifth on the balance beam and floor exercise. D'Amato next competed at the Cairo World Cup, where she won gold on the uneven bars and silver on floor exercise behind Joscelyn Roberson. Her results in Cottbus and Cairo won her the World Cup series titles on both the uneven bars and floor exercise.

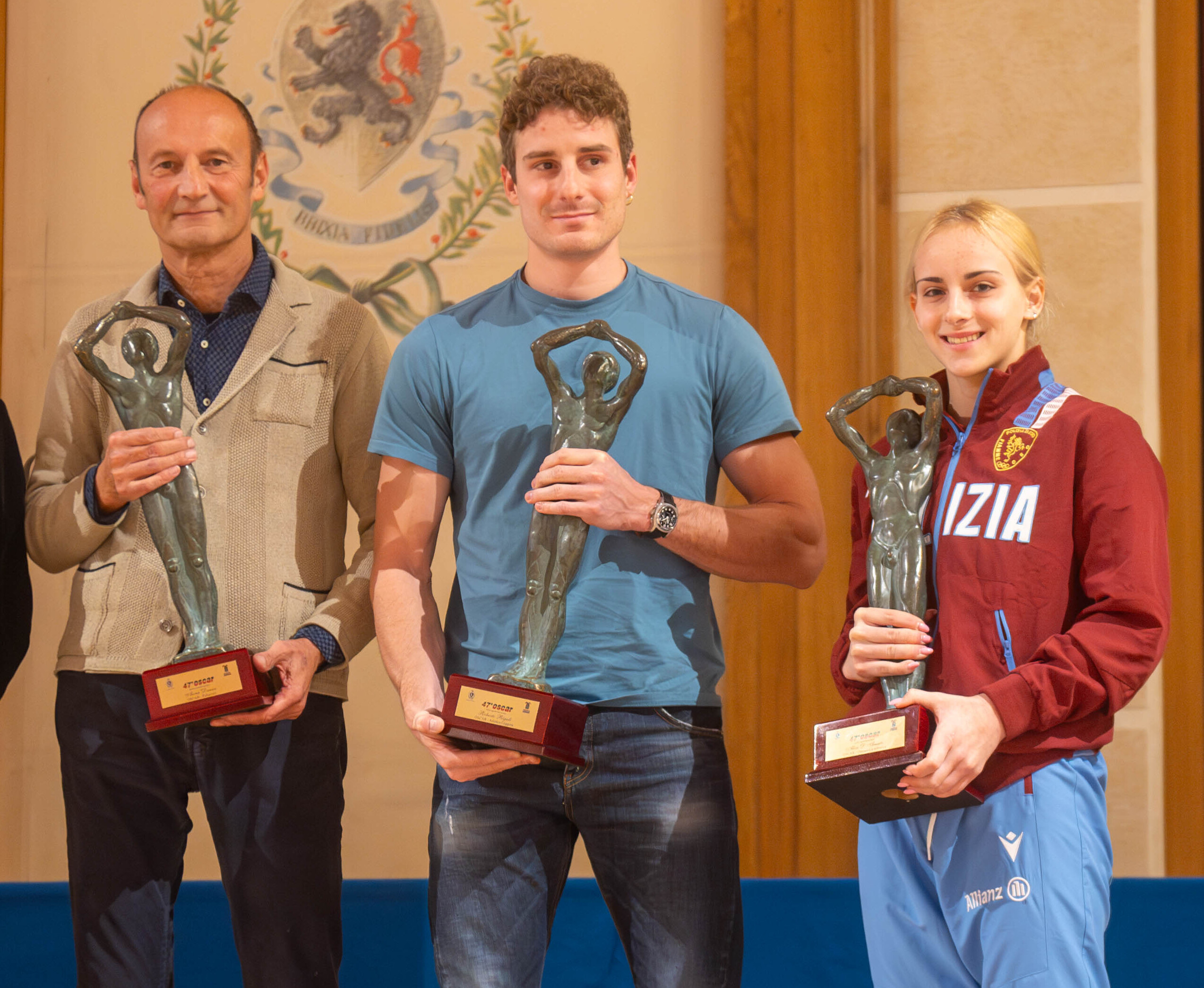
D'Amato (right) receiving her Oscar of Brescia sport in 2023

D'Amato competed at the 2023 World Championships alongside Elisa Iorio, Angela Andreoli, Manila Esposito, and Arianna Belardelli; together they finished fifth as a team. Individually, D'Amato finished fifth in the all-around.

In November, D'Amato was awarded the Oscars of Brescia sport, alongside Roberto Rigali and Anna Danesi.

=== 2024 ===
D'Amato competed at the 2024 European Championships alongside Manila Esposito, Asia D'Amato, Angela Andreoli, and Elisa Iorio. On the first day of competition, D'Amato won silver in the all-around competition behind compatriot Esposito. During event finals, she earned her second consecutive uneven bars title and finished fifth on balance beam. On the final day of competition, the team final, D'Amato contributed scores on vault, uneven bars, and balance beam, helping Italy win their third European team title.

In July, D'Amato competed at the Italian Championships, where she won her second consecutive national all-around title. At the conclusion of the competition, she was named to the team to represent Italy at the 2024 Summer Olympics alongside Esposito, Andreoli, Iorio, and Giorgia Villa.

At the 2024 Olympic Games D'Amato helped Italy qualify to the team final in second place. Individually, she qualified for the all-around, uneven bars, balance beam, and floor exercise event finals; in qualifying to four individual finals, D'Amato tied Simone Biles and Rebeca Andrade as the gymnast who qualified to the most individual finals. During the team final, D'Amato contributed scores on all four events towards Italy's second-place finish, tying Italy's highest Olympic team placement. The last time the Italian women won an Olympic team medal was 96 years prior at the 1928 Olympic Games. D'Amato finished fourth in the all-around final, just 0.132 points behind bronze medallist Sunisa Lee. In finishing fourth, D'Amato became the highest placing Italian gymnast in an Olympic all-around final, surpassing Vanessa Ferrari who finished eighth in 2012.

On the second day of individual apparatus event finals, D'Amato finished fifth on uneven bars. On the final day of competition, D'Amato won gold on the balance beam with a score of 14.366 points. By winning this gold medal D'Amato became the first Italian female artistic gymnast to become an Olympic champion. D'Amato ended the competition placing sixth on floor exercise.

In December D'Amato was awarded her second consecutive Oscar of Brescia Sport alongside the other four Olympic gold medalists from Brescia – Anna Danesi, Giovanni De Gennaro, Federico Bicelli, and Alice Bellandi.

=== 2025–2026 ===
D'Amato returned to competition at the 2025 City of Jesolo Trophy where she helped Italy win gold as a team. Individually, she won bronze on balance beam. She was selected for the team to compete at the 2025 European Championships alongside Manila Esposito, Giulia Perotti, Emma Fioravanti, and Sofia Tonelli. While there D'Amato helped Italy win gold as a team. D'Amato ended the year competing at the Italian National Championships where she won silver in the all-around behind Perotti.

In early 2026, D'Amato underwent shoulder surgery.

== Competitive history ==
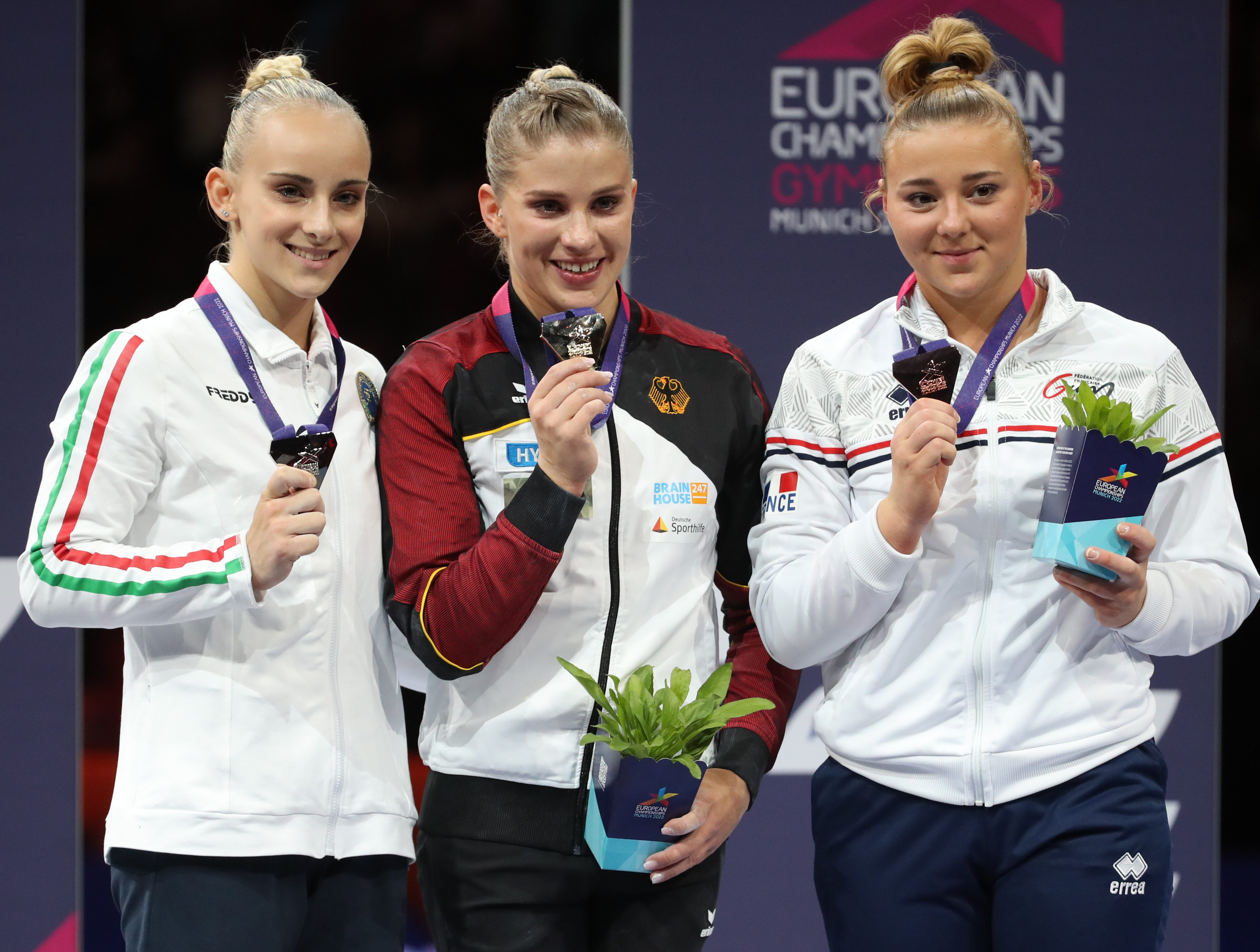
D'Amato (left) on the uneven bars podium at the 2022 European Championships

Competitive history of Alice D'Amato at the junior level
Year	Event	Team	AA	VT	UB	BB	FX
2015	City of Jesolo Trophy		24				
2016	Italian Event Championships				1st place, gold medalist(s)		
2017	1st Italian Serie A	1st place, gold medalist(s)					
2017	International Gymnix	2nd place, silver medalist(s)	7		7		
2017	City of Jesolo Trophy	2nd place, silver medalist(s)	20			6	
2017	Mediterranean Championships	1st place, gold medalist(s)	2nd place, silver medalist(s)			2nd place, silver medalist(s)	1st place, gold medalist(s)
2017	German Junior Friendly	1st place, gold medalist(s)	4				
2017	Euro Youth Olympic Festival	2nd place, silver medalist(s)					
2017	Italian Championships		3rd place, bronze medalist(s)		7	3rd place, bronze medalist(s)	8
2017	4th Italian Serie A		1st place, gold medalist(s)				
2018	1st Italian Serie A	1st place, gold medalist(s)	3rd place, bronze medalist(s)				
2018	International Gymnix		2nd place, silver medalist(s)	7			
2018	Italian Championships				2nd place, silver medalist(s)		
2018	Pieve di Soligo Friendly	1st place, gold medalist(s)					
2018	European Championships	1st place, gold medalist(s)					

Competitive history of Alice D'Amato at the senior level
Year	Event	Team	AA	VT	UB	BB	FX
2019	1st Italian Serie A	1st place, gold medalist(s)	5				
2019	City of Jesolo Trophy	3rd place, bronze medalist(s)	5		5		
2019	2nd Italian Serie A	1st place, gold medalist(s)			2nd place, silver medalist(s)		
2019	European Championships		4		3rd place, bronze medalist(s)		
2019	3rd Italian Serie A	1st place, gold medalist(s)		3rd place, bronze medalist(s)	2nd place, silver medalist(s)		
2019	Heerenveen Friendly	1st place, gold medalist(s)	4				
2019	World Championships	3rd place, bronze medalist(s)					
2020	1st Italian Serie A	1st place, gold medalist(s)		2nd place, silver medalist(s)	3rd place, bronze medalist(s)		
2020	3rd Italian Serie A	1st place, gold medalist(s)		1st place, gold medalist(s)	2nd place, silver medalist(s)		
2020	National Championships		5		4		8
2021	1st Italian Serie A	1st place, gold medalist(s)					
2021	3rd Italian Serie A	1st place, gold medalist(s)	4				
2021	European Championships				5		
2021	FIT Challenge	3rd place, bronze medalist(s)	7				6
2021	National Championships				3rd place, bronze medalist(s)		
2021	Olympic Games	4	20				
2021	World Championships		8		R3		
2021	Swiss Cup	3rd place, bronze medalist(s)					
2022	1st Italian Serie A	1st place, gold medalist(s)			1st place, gold medalist(s)		
2022	City of Jesolo Trophy	2nd place, silver medalist(s)					
2022	Mediterranean Games	1st place, gold medalist(s)					
2022	European Championships	1st place, gold medalist(s)			2nd place, silver medalist(s)		
2022	National Championships		2nd place, silver medalist(s)		4	8	2nd place, silver medalist(s)
2022	World Championships	5	10		R1		WD
2022	Arthur Gander Memorial		1st place, gold medalist(s)				
2023	Cottbus World Cup				1st place, gold medalist(s)		4
2023	City of Jesolo Trophy	1st place, gold medalist(s)	2nd place, silver medalist(s)		1st place, gold medalist(s)		
2023	European Championships	2nd place, silver medalist(s)	3rd place, bronze medalist(s)		1st place, gold medalist(s)	5	5
2023	Cairo World Cup				1st place, gold medalist(s)		2nd place, silver medalist(s)
2023	National Championships		1st place, gold medalist(s)		1st place, gold medalist(s)		
2023	World Championships	5	5				
2024	City of Jesolo Trophy	1st place, gold medalist(s)	1st place, gold medalist(s)		2nd place, silver medalist(s)		
2024	European Championships	1st place, gold medalist(s)	2nd place, silver medalist(s)		1st place, gold medalist(s)	5	
2024	National Championships		1st place, gold medalist(s)		1st place, gold medalist(s)	1st place, gold medalist(s)	3rd place, bronze medalist(s)
2024	Olympic Games	2nd place, silver medalist(s)	4		5	1st place, gold medalist(s)	6
2025	City of Jesolo Trophy	1st place, gold medalist(s)				3rd place, bronze medalist(s)	
2025	European Championships	1st place, gold medalist(s)					
2025	National Championships		2nd place, silver medalist(s)				
