= Mana Okamura =

Japanese artistic gymnast (born 2005)

- 岡村 真
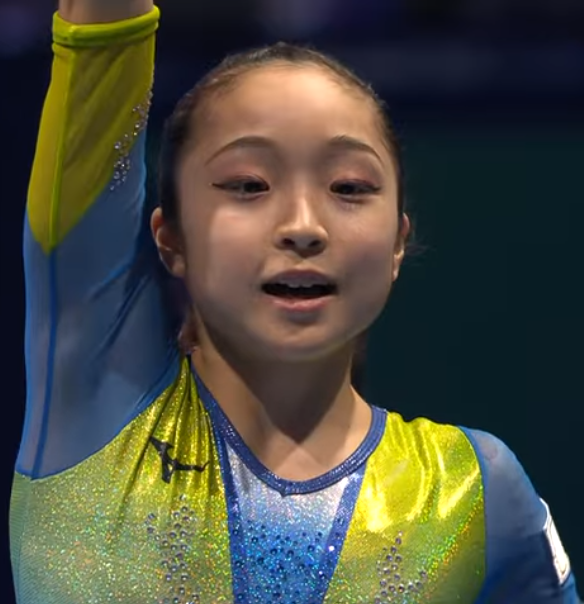
- Okamura at the 2025 World University Games

Personal information
- Born: 28 May 2005 (age 21) Mie Prefecture, Japan

Gymnastics career
- Discipline: Women's artistic gymnastics
- Country represented: Japan; (2023–present)
- Club: Sohgoh Gymnastics Club
Medal record
Representing Japan
World Championships
Bronze medal – third place	2026 Rotterdam	Team
Asian Games
Gold medal – first place	2022 Hangzhou	Balance beam
Silver medal – second place	2022 Hangzhou	Team
Silver medal – second place	2022 Hangzhou	All-around
Silver medal – second place	2026 Aichi-Nagoya	Team
Bronze medal – third place	2026 Aichi-Nagoya	Balance beam
World University Games
Gold medal – first place	2025 Rhine-Ruhr	Team
Silver medal – second place	2025 Rhine-Ruhr	All-around
Asian Championships
Silver medal – second place	2026 Zunyi	Team
FIG World Cup
Event / 1st / 2nd / 3rd; Apparatus World Cup / 4 / 1 / 1

Mana Okamura (Japanese: 岡村 真; born 28 May 2005) is a Japanese artistic gymnast. She was part of the bronze medal-winning team at the 2026 World Championships. She was also the 2022 Asian Games balance beam champion. Okamura represented Japan at the 2024 Summer Olympics.

== Career ==
Okamura finished ninth in the all-around at the 2019 All-Japan Junior Championships. She made her international debut at the 2020 WOGA Classic and finished second in the all-around to Skye Blakely. She then placed 17th in the all-around at the 2020 All-Japan Championships.

=== 2021 ===
Okamura became age-eligible for senior international competitions in 2021. She finished 15th in the all-around at the 2021 All-Japan Championships and 13th at the NHK Trophy. She qualified for the balance beam final at the All-Japan Event Championships and placed fourth. She helped her club place 12th at the All-Japan Team Championships.

=== 2022 ===
Okamura placed 13th in the all-around at the All-Japan Championships and 11th at the NHK Trophy. At the All-Japan Event Championships, she repeated her fourth-place finish on the balance beam. She had the second-highest all-around score behind Shoko Miyata at the All-Japan Team Championships and helped her club finish 11th.

=== 2023 ===
Okamura made her senior international debut at the Cottbus World Cup and won the gold medal on the balance beam. At the All-Japan Championships, she finished seventh in the all-around, and she finished also finished seventh at the NHK Trophy. She finished sixth on the floor exercise at the All-Japan Event Championships.

At the 2022 Asian Games, held in 2023 due to COVID-19 concerns, Okamura led the Japanese team to a second-place finish behind China. She qualified for the all-around final where she won the silver medal behind China's Zuo Tong. She then won a gold medal in the balance beam final, the first time a Japanese gymnast won the Asian Games balance beam title. She also placed eighth on uneven bars and fourth on floor exercise. At the All-Japan Team Championships, she had the second-highest score on the balance beam behind Urara Ashikawa and helped her club place tenth.

=== 2024 ===
Okamura began the 2024 season at the Cairo World Cup where she won a gold medal on the floor exercise and a bronze medal on the balance beam. She finished fourth in the all-around at the All-Japan Championships. She then won the bronze medal in the all-around at the NHK Trophy and was selected for the Japanese Olympic team alongside Shoko Miyata, Rina Kishi, Haruka Nakamura, and Kohane Ushioku. At the 2024 Olympics, she contributed to Japan's eighth place finish in the team final. Though she ranked 19th in the all-around during qualifications, she was ineligible to compete in the all-around final due to the two-per-country rule, as her teammates Kishi and Nakamura qualified ahead of her.

=== 2025 ===
In March, Okamura competed at the Antalya World Cup, qualifying for the balance beam and floor exercise finals and winning the silver medal on beam. At that same competition, she introduced a new element on the uneven bars, the Okamura. She next competed at the 2025 All-Japan Championships, where she won gold on balance beam as well as silver on floor exercise. At the NHK Trophy in May, she won silver on balance beam, as well as bronze on floor exercise and in the all-around. In July, Okamura competed at the 2025 World University Games, winning the gold medal with the Japanese team as well as silver in the all-around. Okamura also represented Japan at the 2025 World Gymnastics Championships with teammates Rina Kishi, Haruka Nakamura, and Aiko Sugihara. She competed on balance beam and floor exercise in the qualification round, but did not advance to any finals.

=== 2026 ===
In October 2026, she competed at the 2026 World Artistic Gymnastics Championships, and won a bronze medal in the team event. This was the first medal for Japan's women's team at the Artistic Gymnastics World Championships since 1966.

== Personal life ==
Okamura graduated from high school in March 2024 and will attend Yokkaichi University.

== Eponymous skill ==
Apparatus	Name	Description	Difficulty (Note: Valid for the 2025–2028 Code of Points)	Added to the Code of Points
Uneven bars	Okamura	From L-grip, swing backward with half turn (180°) to double salto backward piked.	D (0.4)	2025 Antalya World Cup

== Competitive history ==
Competitive history of Mana Okamura
Year	Event	Team	AA	VT	UB	BB	FX
2019	All-Japan Junior Championships		9				
2020	WOGA Classic		2nd place, silver medalist(s)	4	4	3rd place, bronze medalist(s)	6
2020	All-Japan Championships		17				
2021	All-Japan Championships		15				
2021	NHK Trophy		13				
2021	All-Japan Event Championships					4	
2021	All-Japan Team Championships	12					
2022	All-Japan Championships		13				
2022	NHK Trophy		11			3rd place, bronze medalist(s)	
2022	All-Japan Event Championships					4	
2022	All-Japan Team Championships	11	2nd place, silver medalist(s)			3rd place, bronze medalist(s)	
2023	Cottbus World Cup					1st place, gold medalist(s)	
2023	All-Japan Championships		7			2nd place, silver medalist(s)	
2023	NHK Trophy		7			2nd place, silver medalist(s)	
2023	All-Japan Event Championships						6
2023	Asian Games	2nd place, silver medalist(s)	2nd place, silver medalist(s)		8	1st place, gold medalist(s)	4
2023	All-Japan Team Championships	10				2nd place, silver medalist(s)	
2024	Cairo World Cup					3rd place, bronze medalist(s)	1st place, gold medalist(s)
2024	All-Japan Championships		4			1st place, gold medalist(s)	
2024	NHK Trophy		3rd place, bronze medalist(s)				
2024	Olympic Games	8					
2025	Antalya World Cup					2nd place, silver medalist(s)	4
2025	NKH Trophy		3rd place, bronze medalist(s)				
2025	World University Games	1st place, gold medalist(s)	2nd place, silver medalist(s)				
2025	World Championships					37	22
2026	Baku World Cup					1st place, gold medalist(s)	1st place, gold medalist(s)
2026	NHK Trophy		4				
2026	Asian Championships	2nd place, silver medalist(s)			4		4
2026	Asian Games	2nd place, silver medalist(s)			8	3rd place, bronze medalist(s)	
2026	World Championships	3rd place, bronze medalist(s)				8	
