= Zuo Tong =

Chinese artistic gymnast (born 2006)

- 左彤
- Born: September 11, 2006 (age 19) Jiangsu
- Height: 153 cm (5 ft 0 in)

Gymnastics career
- Discipline: Women's artistic gymnastics
- Country represented: China
Medal record
Representing China
Women's artistic gymnastics
Asian Games
Gold medal – first place	2022 Hangzhou	Team
Gold medal – first place	2022 Hangzhou	All-around
Bronze medal – third place	2022 Hangzhou	Uneven bars
National Games
Silver medal – second place	2021 Shaanxi	Floor exercise

Zuo Tong (born September 11, 2006) is a Chinese gymnast. She won the all-around at the 2022 Asian Games. She also won the silver medal at the 2021 National Games on floor exercise.

Zuo competed for China at the 2022 Asian Games. She received a score of 53.565 in the individual competition, taking home the gold medal. She also won bronze on the uneven bars with a score of 13.866. Despite missing a few big names, the team won gold.
