= Kohane Ushioku =

Japanese artistic gymnast

- 牛奥 小羽
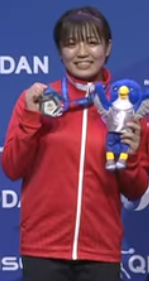
- Ushioku at the 2025 World University Games

Personal information
- Born: 17 August 2004 (age 22) Aichi Prefecture, Japan
- Height: 147 cm (4 ft 10 in)

Gymnastics career
- Discipline: Women's artistic gymnastics
- Country represented: Japan; (2023–present)
- Club: Nippon Sport Science University
- Head coach: Mai Murakami
Medal record
Representing Japan
Asian Games
Silver medal – second place	2022 Hangzhou	Team
World University Games
Gold medal – first place	2025 Rhine-Ruhr	Team
Silver medal – second place	2021 Chengdu	Team
Silver medal – second place	2025 Rhine-Ruhr	Vault
Silver medal – second place	2025 Rhine-Ruhr	Floor exercise

Kohane Ushioku (Japanese: 牛奥 小羽; born 17 August 2004) is a Japanese artistic gymnast. She won a silver medal in the team events at the 2022 Asian Games and 2021 Summer World University Games. She represented Japan at the 2024 Summer Olympics.

== Career ==
Ushioku helped the Let's Gymnastics club finish ninth at the 2018 All-Japan Team Championships. She placed seventh in the vault final at the 2019 All-Japan Event Championships. She then finished 30th in the all-around ay the All-Japan Junior Championships but had the third-highest score on the vault. At the 2019 All-Japan Team Championships, she helped her club repeat its ninth-place finish.

Ushioku became age-eligible for senior international competitions in 2020, but most competitions were canceled due to the COVID-19 pandemic. In December 2020, she finished 68th in the qualification round of the All-Japan Championships.

=== 2021–2022 ===
Ushioku finished 66th in the qualification round of the 2021 All-Japan Championships. She then finished seventh in the vault final at the All-Japan Event Championships. At the All-Japan Team Championships, she had the highest vault score and helped her club win the silver medal behind Nippon Sport Science University.

Ushioku finished 26th in the qualification round at the 2022 All-Japan Championships. At the All-Japan Event Championships, she won the vault title. Her club finished fifth at the All-Japan Team Championships, and she had the second-highest vault score behind Shoko Miyata.

=== 2023 ===
Ushioku made her international debut at the Cottbus World Cup, but she did not advance to any finals. She placed tenth in the all-around at the All-Japan Championships, and she placed ninth at the NHK Trophy. Then at the All-Japan Event Championships, she won the bronze medal on the vault and finished sixth on uneven bars and seventh on floor exercise.

Ushioku helped the Japanese team win the silver medal at the World University Games. She then won a silver medal with the Japanese team at the Asian Games. Individually, she qualified for the all-around final, but she withdrew after injuring her leg during the warmups.

=== 2024 ===
Ushioku finished 14th in the all-around at the All-Japan Championships but had the second-highest score on vault. She then finished ninth in the all-around at the NHK Trophy. Because of her strength on vault, she was selected for the final spot on the Japanese Olympic team alongside Shoko Miyata, Rina Kishi, Haruka Nakamura, and Mana Okamura.

== Competitive history ==
Competitive history of Kohane Ushioku
Year	Event	Team	AA	VT	UB	BB	FX
2018	All-Japan Team Championships	9					
2019	All-Japan Event Championships			7			
2019	All-Japan Junior Championships		30	3rd place, bronze medalist(s)			
2019	All-Japan Team Championships	9					
2020	All-Japan Championships		68				
2021	All-Japan Championships		66				
2021	All-Japan Event Championships			7			
2021	All-Japan Team Championships	2nd place, silver medalist(s)		1st place, gold medalist(s)			
2022	All-Japan Championships		26				
2022	All-Japan Event Championships			1st place, gold medalist(s)			
2022	All-Japan Team Championships	5	11	2nd place, silver medalist(s)			
2023	All-Japan Championships		10	3rd place, bronze medalist(s)			
2023	NHK Trophy		9	3rd place, bronze medalist(s)			
2023	All-Japan Event Championships			3rd place, bronze medalist(s)	6		7
2023	World University Games	2nd place, silver medalist(s)					
2023	Asian Games	2nd place, silver medalist(s)	WD				
2024	All-Japan Championships		14	2nd place, silver medalist(s)			
2024	NHK Trophy		9				
2024	Olympic Games	8					
2025	NKH Trophy		9				
2025	World University Games	1st place, gold medalist(s)		2nd place, silver medalist(s)			2nd place, silver medalist(s)
2026	Cottbus World Cup			4			
