= Italy at the 2026 Mediterranean Games =

- IOC code: ITA
- NOC: Italian Olympic Committee

in Taranto, Italy 20 August 2026 – 3 September 2026
- Competitors: 498 in 29 sports
- Flag bearers: Filippo Tortu; Irma Testa (opening)
- Medals Ranked 1st: Gold 74 Silver 78 Bronze 72 Total 224

Mediterranean Games appearances (overview)
- 1951; 1955; 1959; 1963; 1967; 1971; 1975; 1979; 1983; 1987; 1991; 1993; 1997; 2001; 2005; 2009; 2013; 2018; 2022; 2026

Italy is the host nation for the 2026 Mediterranean Games, which is currently held from 20 August to 3 September 2026.

== Medal table ==
Medal	Name	Sport	Event	Date
Gold	Benedetta Pilato	Swimming	Women's 100 m breaststroke	August 22
Gold	Gabriele Mancini	Swimming	Men's 100 metre breaststroke	August 22
Gold	Noemi Cesarano	Swimming	Women's 1500 metre freestyle	August 22
Gold	Elena Voltan	Canoeing	Women's C-1 200 metres	August 23
Gold	Samuele Veglianti	Canoeing	Men's C-1 1000 metres	August 23
Gold	Sara Bongini	Shooting	Women's skeet	August 23
Gold	Costanza Cocconcelli	Swimming	Women's 50 metre backstroke	August 23
Gold	Alberto Razzetti	Swimming	Men's 100 metre butterfly	August 23
Gold	Jacopo Barbotti	Swimming	Men's 200 metre freestyle	August 23
Gold	Lisa Angiolini	Swimming	Women's 200 metre breaststroke	August 23
Gold	Marco De Tullio	Swimming	Men's 800 metre freestyle	August 23
Gold	Costanza Cocconcelli; Francesco Lazzari; Gabriele Mancini; Chiara Tarantino	Swimming	Mixed 4×100 metre freestyle relay	August 23
Gold	Roberta Marzani	Fencing	Women's épee	August 23
Gold	Rachele Barbieri	Cycling	Women's individual road race	August 24
Gold	Tommaso Dati	Cycling	Men's individual road race	August 24
Gold	Noemi Cesarano	Swimming	Women's 800 metre freestyle	August 24
Gold	Lisa Angiolini	Swimming	Women's 50 metre breaststroke	August 24
Gold	Giada Alzetta	Swimming	Women's 400 metre individual medley	August 24
Gold	Alberto Razzetti	Swimming	Men's 400 metre individual medley	August 24
Gold	Laura Picchio	Boules	Women's raffa single	August 25
Gold	Diego Rizzi	Boules	Men's pétanque precision throw	August 25
Gold	Laura Picchio; Kety Crescenzi	Boules	Women's raffa doubles	August 25
Gold	Sara Franceschi	Swimming	Women's 200 metre individual medley	August 25
Gold	Simone Spediacci	Swimming	Men's 200 metre individual medley	August 25
Gold	Giovanni Guatti	Swimming	Men's 50 metre freestyle	August 25
Gold	Paola Borrelli	Swimming	Women's 200 metre butterfly	August 25
Gold	Alberto Razzetti	Swimming	Men's 200 metre butterfly	August 25
Gold	Diego Rizzi; Andrea Chiapello	Boules	Men's pétanque doubles	August 25
Gold	Matteo Diodato	Swimming	Men's 1500 metre freestyle	August 25
Gold	Fabio Caponio	Badminton	Men's singles	August 26
Gold	Viola Magoga	Finswimming	Women's 50 metres bi-fins	August 26
Gold	Filippo Pavoni	Finswimming	Men's 100 metres bi-fins	August 26
Gold	Irma Testa	Boxing	Women's featherweight	August 27
Gold	Melissa Gemini	Boxing	Women's middleweight	August 27
Gold	Gabriele Guidi Rontani	Boxing	Men's welterweight	August 27
Gold	Sirine Charaabi	Boxing	Women's bantamweight	August 27
Gold	Viola Magoga	Finswimming	Women's 100 metres bi-fins	August 27
Gold	Lorenzo Caronno	Finswimming	Men's 200 metres surface	August 27
Gold	Elettra Calanca	Finswimming	Women's 400 metres bi-fins	August 27
Gold	Filippo Pavoni; Giulia Bruni; Marco Orsi; Viola Magoga	Finswimming	Mixed 4x50 metres bi-fins	August 27
Gold	Danilo Sollazzo	Shooting	Men's rifle	August 28
Gold	Melissa Gatti	Roller Marathon	Women's marathon	August 28
Gold	Matteo Mutti; Carlo Rossi; John Michael Oyebode	Table tennis	Men's team	August 28
Gold	Carlotta Avanzato	Judo	Women's 63 kg	August 29
Gold	Bianca Seregni	Triathlon	Women's individual	August 29
Gold	Fabrizio Esposito; Manuel Parlati; Christian Parlati; Jean Carletti; Valerio Accogli; Kwadjo Anani; Carlotta Avanzato; Irene Pedrotti; Michela Terranova; Asya Tavano; Claudia Sperotti; Gaia Stella	Judo	Mixed Team	August 30
Gold	Francesco Inzoli	Athletics	Men's long jump	August 30
Gold	Giovanni Frattini	Athletics	Men's javelin throw	August 30
Gold	Eleonora Calaciuria; Emma Fioravanti; Benedetta Gava; Artemisia Iorfino; Sofia Tonelli; Angela Andreoli	Artistic gymnastic	Women's artistic team all-around	August 30
Gold	Filippo Romano; Vittoria Paganetti	Tennis	Mixed double	August 30
Gold	Sergio Masidda	Weightlifting	Men's 65 kg clean & jerk	August 31
Gold	Martina Chiacco	Weightlifting	Women's 61 kg snatch	August 31
Gold	Martina Chiacco	Weightlifting	Women's 61 kg clean & jerk	August 31
Gold	Celeste Polzonetti	Athletics	Women's 100 metres hurdles	August 31
Gold	Federica Del Buono	Athletics	Women's 10000 metres	August 31
Gold	Lorenzo Ianes; Damiano Dentato; Filippo Randazzo; Filippo Cappelletti	Athletics	Men's 4x100 metres relay	August 31
Gold	Paola Sacchi; Riccardo Cultore; Euan De Nigro; Bianca Seregni	Triathlon	Mixed relay	August 31
Gold	Noemi Basiletti	Tennis	Women's Singles	August 31
Gold	Giulia Miserendino	Weightlifting	Women's 69 kg snatch	September 1
Gold	Gianmarco Tamberi	Athletics	Men's high jump	September 1
Gold	Nick Ponzio	Athletics	Men's shot put	September 1
Gold	Erika Saraceni	Athletics	Women' triple jump	September 1
Gold	Margherita Danti; Giorgia Meneghini; Asia Kristel Mangone; Ilaria Dalla Costa; Rocio Stephani Squizziato; Eleonora Colloredo; Sofia Ghilardi; Giulia Antonia Fabbo; Julia Maurer; Ramona Vesna Manojlovic; Francesca Luchin; Angela Prela; Giada Babbo; Aurora Gislimberti; Bianca Ioana Barbosu	Handball	Women's tournament	September 1
Gold	Benedetta Gava	Artistic gymnastics	Women's vault	September 2
Gold	Elena Sali; Melissa Schincariol	Rowing	Women's lightweight doube sculls	September 2
Gold	Tito Christoforakis; Giovanni Borgonovo	Rowing	Men's lightweight doube sculls	September 2
Gold	Leonardo Tomasini	Sailing	Men's IQFoil	September 2
Gold	Vittoria Fontana	Athletics	Women's 200 metres	September 2
Gold	Sara Fantini	Athletics	Women's hammer throw	September 2
Gold	Ayomide Folorunso	Athletics	Women's 400 metres hurdles	September 2
Gold	Erik Marek; Alice Pagliarini; Dalia Kaddari; Filippo Cappelletti	Athletics	4x100 metres mixed relay	September 2
Gold	Clarissa Vianelli; Sara Cirillo; Ginevra Ricci; Ilaria Elvira Accame	Athletics	Women's 4x400	September 2
Gold	Benedetta Gava	Artistic gymnastics	Women's floor	September 2
Gold	Alessandro Balzarini; Alessandro Carnesecchi; Francesco Lorenzo Cassia; Andrea Condemi; Francesco Condemi; Francesco De Michelis; Filippo Ferrero; Alessandro Gullotta; Matteo Iocchi Gratta; Luca Izzo; Andrea Mladossich; Davide Occhione; Andrea Patchaliev; Tomas Alfonso Pozo	Water polo	Men's tournament	September 3
Silver	Christian Mantegazza	Swimming	Men's 100 metre breaststroke	August 22
Silver	Lisa Angiolini	Swimming	Women's 100 m breaststroke	August 22
Silver	Viola Scotto Di Carlo	Swimming	Women's 50 metre butterfly	August 22
Silver	Lorenzo Gargani	Swimming	Men's 50 metre butterfly	August 22
Silver	Bianca Nannucci	Swimming	Women's 400 metre freestyle	August 22
Silver	Alessandro Ragaini	Swimming	Men's 400 metre freestyle	August 22
Silver	Federica Toma	Swimming	Men's 200 metre backstroke	August 22
Silver	Matteo Venini	Swimming	Women's 200 metre backstroke	August 22
Silver	Sophia Vianello; Sofia Zucca	Canoeing	Women's K-2 500 metres	August 23
Silver	Giacomo Rossi	Canoeing	Men's K-1 1000 metres	August 23
Silver	Francesco Lazzari	Swimming	Men's 50 metre backstroke	August 23
Silver	Martina Biasoli	Swimming	Women's 50 metre backstroke	August 23
Silver	Edoardo Valsecchi	Swimming	Men's 100 metre butterfly	August 23
Silver	Anna Chiara Mascolo	Swimming	Women's 200 metre freestyle	August 23
Silver	Christian Mantegazza	Swimming	Men's 200 metre breaststroke	August 23
Silver	Nikoloz Kakhelashvili	Wrestling	Men's greco-roman 97 kg	August 23
Silver	Martina Fidanza	Cycling	Wome's individual road race	August 24
Silver	Gabriele Mancini	Swimming	Men's 50 metre breaststroke	August 24
Silver	Anna Pirovano	Swimming	Women's 400 metre individual medley	August 24
Silver	Chiara Tarantino	Swimming	Women's 100 metre freestyle	August 24
Silver	Davide Filippi	Fencing	Men's foil	August 24
Silver	Chiara Della Corte	Swimming	Women's 200 metre individual medley	August 25
Silver	Elena Capretta	Swimming	Women's 50 metre freestyle	August 25
Silver	Lorenzo Ballarati	Swimming	Men's 50 metre freestyle	August 25
Silver	Andrea Camozzi	Swimming	Men's 200 metre butterfly	August 25
Silver	Federica Toma	Swimming	Women's 100 metre backstroke	August 25
Silver	Francesco Lazzari	Swimming	Men's 100 metre backstroke	August 25
Silver	Matteo Mana	Boules	Men's lyonnaise precision throw	August 25
Silver	Laura Godino	Wrestling	Women's freestyle 68 kg	August 25
Silver	Erica Sessa	Shooting	Women's trap	August 26
Silver	Yasmine Hamza	Badminton	Women's singles	August 26
Silver	Anna Leonardi	Finswimming	Women's 200 metres surface	August 26
Silver	Elettra Calanca	Finswimming	Women's 200 metres bi-fins	August 26
Silver	Lorenzo Caronno	Finswimming	Men's 400 metres surface	August 26
Silver	Fabio Biancalana; Anna Raffaetà; Leonardo Spelta; Giulia Bruni	Finswimming	Mixed 4x100 metres surface	August 26
Silver	Filippo Pavoni	Finswimming	Men's 50 metres bi-fins	August 27
Silver	Giulia Bruni	Finswimming	Women's 100 metres surface	August 27
Silver	Riccardo Porciani	Finswimming	Men's 200 metres bi-fins	August 27
Silver	Laura Franchin	Finswimming	Women's 400 metres bi-fins	August 27
Silver	Francesco Gregori	Archery	Men's individual	August 28
Silver	Nicole Arlia; Gaia Monfardini; Giorgia Piccolin	Table tennis	Women's team	August 28
Silver	Marco Cassetta; Giulia Dal Pozzo	Padel	Mixed pairs	August 28
Silver	Flavio Abbate; Alvaro Montiel Caruso	Padel	Men's pairs	August 28
Silver	Margherita Brigida Veccaro	Shooting	Women's pistol	August 29
Silver	Christian Parlati	Judo	Men's 90 kg	August 29
Silver	Euan De Nigro	Triathlon	Men's individual	August 29
Silver	Kwadjo Anani	Judo	Men's +100 kg	August 29
Silver	Asya Tavano	Judo	Women's +78 kg	August 29
Silver	Carlotta Salafia; Danilo Sollazzo	Shooting	Mixed rifle team	August 30
Silver	Noemi Basiletti; Vittoria Paganetti	Tennis	Women's double	August 30
Silver	Michele Fina	Athletics	Men's javelin throw	August 30
Silver	Micol Majori	Athletics	Women's 5000 metres	August 30
Silver	Erik Marek	Athletics	Men's 100 metres	August 30
Silver	Federico Falsetti; Sara Cirillo; Riccardo Meli; Ilaria Elvira Accame	Athletics	4x400 metres mixed relay	August 30
Silver	Alice Alexandra Tanase; Yasmina Akrari; Ilenia Moro; Chidera Blessing Chinyere Eze; Linda Manfredini; Josephine Obossa; Alessia Bolzonetti; Valeria Battista; Dalila Marchesini; Beatrice Gardini; Francesca Scola; Alice Nardo	Volleyball	Women's tournament	August 30
Silver	Elena Carraro	Athletics	Women's 100 metres hurdles	August 31
Silver	Flavia Pezzi; Chiara Grassi; Rachele Andreangeli; Matilde Oddina; Daria Rosso; Anna Messa; Elisa Ciurleo; Miranda Grace Sterner; Giulia Guerzoni; Viola Saccomandi; Alice Agostini; Viola Cacace; Sophie Miraldi; Giorgia Galluzzi; Mya Ciccarelli; Beatrice Martone; Agata Pinchi; Viola Pieri	Football	Women's tournament	August 31
Silver	Tommaso Brugnami; Ivan Brunello; Matteo Levantesi; Stefano Patron; Niccolò Vannucchi; Diego Vazzola	Artistic gymnastic	Men's artistic team all-around	August 31
Silver	Niccolò Gandola; Chiara Cobalchini	Rowing	Mixed lightweight double sculls	September 1
Silver	Erminia Perfetto	Karate	Women's - 50 kg	September 1
Silver	Veronica Brunori	Karate	Women's - 55 kg	September 1
Silver	Silvia Semeraro	Karate	Women's - 68 kg	September 1
Silver	Matteo Corgnati; Matteo Gherardini; Francesco Gravighi; Tiagande Willis Tio	3x3 basketball	Men's Tournament	September 1
Silver	Giorgia Amatori; Ilaria Bernardi; Loredana Ngamene Takougang; Nancy N’Guessan	3x3 basketball	Women's Tournament	September 1
Silver	Alessandra Bonora	Athletics	Women's 400 metres	September 1
Silver	Ivan Brunello	Artistic gymnastics	Men's floor	September 2
Silver	Niccolo Vannucchi	Artistic gymnastics	Men's rings	September 2
Silver	Josef Marvucic; Marco Prati	Rowing	Men's doube sculls	September 2
Silver	Genna Toko Kegne	Weightlifting	Women's 77 kg snatch	September 2
Silver	Genna Toko Kegne	Weightlifting	Women's 77 kg clean & jerk	September 2
Silver	Federico Allan Pilloni	Sailing	Men's IQFoil	September 2
Silver	Medea Falcioni	Sailing	Women's IQFoil	September 2
Silver	Sofia Tonelli	Artistics gymnastic	Women's uneven bars	September 2
Silver	Filippo Dezza	Athletics	Men's 200 metres	September 2
Silver	Federico Lorenzo Bruno	Athletics	Men's triple jump	September 2
Silver	Benedetta Benedetti	Athletics	Women's discus throw	September 2
Silver	Gaia Urbinati	Skateboarding	Women's Street	September 2
Silver	Tommaso Brugnami	Artistic gymnastics	Men's vault	September 2
Bronze	Antonietta Cesarano	Swimming	Women's 400 metre freestyle	August 22
Bronze	Azzurra Sbaragli	Swimming	Women's 1500 metre freestyle	August 22
Bronze	Giacomo Cinti; Alesso Campari	Canoeing	Men's K-2 500 metres	August 23
Bronze	Paola Borrelli	Swimming	Women's 100 metre butterfly	August 23
Bronze	Francesca Zucca	Swimming	Women's 200 metre breaststroke	August 23
Bronze	Luca Dariozzi	Wrestling	Men's greco-roman 77 kg	August 23
Bronze	Barbara Guarischi	Cycling	Women's individual road race	August 24
Bronze	Federico Iacomoni	Cycling	Men's individual road race	August 24
Bronze	Diego Verganti	Boules	Men's lyonnaise progressive shooting	August 24
Bronze	Giulio Lombardi	Fencing	Men's foil	August 24
Bronze	Gaia Gamba	Boules	Women's lyonnaise progressive shooting	August 24
Bronze	Irene Mati	Swimming	Women's 50 metre breaststroke	August 24
Bronze	Emanuele Potenza	Swimming	Men's 400 metre individual medley	August 24
Bronze	Irene Bertini	Fencing	Women's foil	August 24
Bronze	Alfonso Nanni; Luca Viscusi	Boules	Men's raffa doubles	August 25
Bronze	Jacopo Barbotti	Swimming	Men's 200 metre individual medley	August 25
Bronze	Agata Maria Ambler	Swimming	Women's 50 metre freestyle	August 25
Bronze	Martina Biasoli	Swimming	Women's 100 metre backstroke	August 25
Bronze	Ivan Giovannoni	Swimming	Men's 1500 metre freestyle	August 25
Bronze	Emanuela Liuzzi	Wrestling	Women's freestyle 50 kg	August 25
Bronze	Fabiana Rinella	Wrestling	Women's freestyle 57 kg	August 25
Bronze	Enrica Rinaldi	Wrestling	Women's freestyle 76 kg	August 25
Bronze	Giovanni Toti	Badminton	Men's singles	August 25
Bronze	Martina Vassallo	Boxing	Women's light flyweight	August 26
Bronze	Michele Baldassi	Boxing	Men's lightweight	August 26
Bronze	Christian Sarsilli	Boxing	Men's light heavyweight	August 26
Bronze	Paolo De Pasquale	Finswimming	Men's 400 metres bi-fins	August 26
Bronze	Valter Prampolini	Finswimming	Men's 400 metres bi-fins	August 26
Bronze	Viola Sella	Rhythmic gymnastic	Women's individual all-around	August 26
Bronze	Emanuele Buccolieri	Shooting	Men's trap	August 26
Bronze	Silvana Maria Stanco; Mauro De Filippis	Shooting	Trap mixed team	August 27
Bronze	Marco Cassetta; Simone Iacovino	Padel	Men's Pairs	August 28
Bronze	Giorgia Marchetti; Carolina Orsi	Padel	Women's Pairs	August 28
Bronze	Giulia Ghiglione	Judo	Women's 48 kg	August 28
Bronze	Valerio Accogli	Judo	Men's 66 kg	August 28
Bronze	Melissa Gatti	Roller Marathon	Women's marathon	August 28
Bronze	Michela Terranova	Judo	Women's 57 kg	August 28
Bronze	Paola Sacchi	Triathlon	Women's individual	August 29
Bronze	Gaia Monfardini; John Michael Oyebode	Table tennis	Mixed doubles	August 29
Bronze	Diego Frascio; Tim Held; Damiano Catania; Alessandro Fanizza; Andrea Truocchio; Federico Crosato; Mattia Orioli; Federico Roberti; Francesco D'Amico; Marco Pellacani; Filippo Mancini; Alessio Tallone	Volleyball	Men's tournament	August 30
Bronze	Sonia Malavisi	Athletics	Women's pole vault	August 30
Bronze	Celine Ludovica Delia	Weightlifting	Women's 53 kg snatch	August 31
Bronze	Sergio Masidda	Weightlifting	Men's 65 kg snatch	August 31
Bronze	Idea Pieroni	Athletics	Women's high jump	August 31
Bronze	Alessio Mannucci	Athletics	Men's discus throw	August 31
Bronze	Sara Verteramo	Athletics	Women's shot put	August 31
Bronze	Arianna Battistella	Athletics	Women's long jump	August 31
Bronze	Carlo Alberto Caniato	Tennis	Men's Singles	August 31
Bronze	Luca Borgonovo	Rowing	Men's lightweight single sculls	September 1
Bronze	Leonardo Tedoldi; Irene Gattiglia	Rowing	Mixed double sculls	September 1
Bronze	Sofia Tonelli	Artistic gymnastic	All around	September 1
Bronze	Luca Maresca	Karate	Men's - 67 kg	September 1
Bronze	Cristiano Giuseppe Ficco	Weightlifting	Men's 85 kg snatch	September 1
Bronze	Cristiano Giuseppe Ficco	Weightlifting	Men's 85 kg clean & jerk	September 1
Bronze	Alessandra Mangiacarpa	Karate	Women's - 61 kg	September 1
Bronze	Daniele De Vivo	Karate	Men's - 75 kg	September 1
Bronze	Lorenzo Benati	Athletics	Men's 400 metres	September 1
Bronze	Christian Falocchi	Athletics	Men's high jump	September 1
Bronze	Alice Mangione	Athletics	Women's 400 metres	September 1
Bronze	Niccolo Vannucchi	Artistics gymnastic	Men's floor	September 2
Bronze	Artemisia Iorfino	Artistics gymnastic	Women's uneven bars	September 2
Bronze	Aurora Spirito; Sara Borghi	Rowing	Women's doube sculls	September 2
Bronze	Cesare Barabino	Sailing	Men's ILCA 7	September 2
Bronze	Carola Colasanto	Sailing	Women's IQFoil	September 2
Bronze	Simone Karol Abati	Weightlifting	Men's 110 kg snatch	September 2
Bronze	Alice Muraro	Athletics	Women's 400 metres hurdles	September 2
Bronze	Federico Falsetti; Riccardo Meli; Lapo Bianciardi; Luca Sito	Athletics	Men's 4x400	September 2
Bronze	Matteo Oliveri	Athletics	Men's pole vault	September 2
Bronze	Irene Panzavolta	Skateboarding	Women's Street	September 2
Bronze	Eleonora Calaciura	Artistic gymnastics	Women's balance beam	September 2
Bronze	Matteo Levantesi	Artistic gymnastics	Men's parallel bars	September 2
Bronze	Emma Fioravanti	Artistic gymnastics	Women's floor	September 2

== Medals by sport ==
Medals by sport
Sport	1st place, gold medalist(s)	2nd place, silver medalist(s)	3rd place, bronze medalist(s)	Total	Rank
3x3 basketball	0	2	0	2	2nd
Archery	0	1	0	1	4th
Artistic gymnastics	3	5	6	14	1st
Athletics	13	9	11	33	1st
Badminton	1	1	1	3	2nd
Boules	4	1	3	8	1st
Boxing	4	0	3	7	2nd
Canoeing	2	2	1	5	1st
Cycling	2	1	2	5	1st
Fencing	1	1	2	4	4th
Finswimming	6	8	2	16	1st
Football	0	1	0	1	3rd
Handball	1	0	0	1	1st
Judo	2	3	3	8	2nd
Karate	0	3	3	6	8th
Padel	0	2	2	4	3rd
Rhythmic gymnastics	0	0	1	1	3rd
Roller speed skating	1	0	1	2	1st
Rowing	2	2	3	7	2nd
Sailing	1	2	2	5	2nd
Shooting	2	3	2	7	2nd
Skateboarding	0	1	1	2	2nd
Swimming	19	22	10	51	1st
Table tennis	1	1	1	3	2nd
Tennis	2	1	1	4	1st
Triathlon	2	1	1	4	1st
Volleyball	0	1	1	2	3rd
Water polo	1	0	0	1	1st
Weightlifting	4	2	5	11	2nd
Wrestling	0	2	4	6	9th

== 3x3 basketball ==
Italy competed in men's and women's tournament. The Italian Basketball Federation has selected these athletes.

Athletes	Event	Group matches				Quarterfinals	Semifinals	Final / BM	
Athletes	Event	Opposition Score	Opposition Score	Opposition Score	Rank	Opposition Score	Opposition Score	Opposition Score	Rank
Matteo Corgnati; Matteo Gherardini; Francesco Gravighi; Tiagande Willis Tio	Men's Tournament	Tunisia; W 21-18	(Spain) Spain; W 20-19	(Bosnia and Herzegovina) Bosnia & Herzegovina; W 20-11	1 Q	(Greece) Greece; W 17-11	(Algeria) Algeria; W 15-13	(Spain) Spain; L 18-20	2nd place, silver medalist(s)
Giorgia Amatori; Ilaria Bernardi; Loredana Ngamene Takougang; Nancy N’Guessan	Women's Tournament	(Kosovo) Kosovo; W 18-7	(Greece) Greece; W 13-11	—N/a	1 Q	(Portugal) Portugal; W 16-12	(France) France; W 11-10	(Spain) Spain; L 11-13	2nd place, silver medalist(s)

== Archery ==
Italy entered 6 athletes into the tournament.

Men

Athlete	Event	Ranking round		Round of 64	Round of 32	Round of 16	Quarterfinals	Semifinals	Final / BM	
Athlete	Event	Score	Seed	Opposition Score	Opposition Score	Opposition Score	Opposition Score	Opposition Score	Opposition Score	Rank
Matteo Borsani	Individual	655	3	Bye	El Helali (CYP); W 6-2	Imloul (ALG); W 6-2	Conde Collar (ESP); L 3-7	Did not advance		
Francesco Gregori	Individual	649	7	Bye	Goncalves (POR); W 6-0	Mandia (ITA); W 6-2	Gazoz (TUR); W 6-0	Conde Collar (ESP); W 6-2	Chirault (FRA); L 1-7	2nd place, silver medalist(s)
Massimiliano Mandia	Individual	640	10	Bye	Tolba (EGY); W 6-2	Gregori (ITA); L 2-6	Did not advance			
Massimiliano Mandia; Francesco Gregori; Matteo Borsani	Team	1944	1	—N/a		Bye	Greece (GRE); W 6-2	France (FRA); L 0-6	Turkey (TUR); L 0-6	4

Women

Athlete	Event	Ranking round		Round of 32	Round of 16	Quarterfinals	Semifinals	Final / BM	
Athlete	Event	Score	Seed	Opposition Score	Opposition Score	Opposition Score	Opposition Score	Opposition Score	Rank
Roberta Di Francesco	Individual	659	1	Bye	Gkorila (GRE); W 6-0	Barbelin (FRA); L 5-6	Did not advance		
Chiara Rebagliati	Individual	646	7	Hadjerotocristou (CYP); W 6-2	Psarra (GRE); W 6-2	Canales (ESP); L 2-6	Did not advance		
Tatiana Andreoli	Individual	646	11	Ben Abdelkader (TUN); W 6-0	Alvarez Gonzalez (ESP); L 4-6	Did not advance			
Roberta Di Francesco; Chiara Rebagliati; Tatiana Andreoli	Team	1930	2	—N/a		Bye	Turkey (TUR); L 4-5	Spain (ESP); L 1-5	4

Mixed

Athlete	Event	Ranking round		Round of 16	Quarterfinals	Semifinals	Final / BM	
Athlete	Event	Score	Seed	Opposition Score	Opposition Score	Opposition Score	Opposition Score	Rank
Matteo Borsani; Roberta Di Francesco	Mixed team	1314	2	Bye	Serbia (SRB); W 6-2	Turkey (TUR); L 2-6	Spain (ESP); L 3-5	4

== Artistic gymnastics ==
Men
Team

Key:

- F - Floor
- PH - Pommel horse
- R - Rings
- V - Vault
- PB - Parallel bars
- HB - Horizontal bar

Athlete	Event	Final							
Athlete	Event	Apparatus						Total	Rank
Athlete	Event	F	PH	R	V	PB	HB	Total	Rank
Tommaso Brugnami	Team	12.400	12.700	12.550	13.500	13.200	12.350	76.700	—N/a
Ivan Brunello	Team	13.750	12.000	12.950	12.750	13.050	12.550	77.050	—N/a
Matteo Levantesi	Team	—N/a	12.400	—N/a	—N/a	14.000	13.400	39.800	—N/a
Stefano Patron	Team	12.850	12.250	12.800	13.150	13.450	12.050	76.550	—N/a
Diego Vazzola	Team	—N/a						—N/a	—N/a
Niccolo Vannucchi	Team	13.900	—N/a	13.700	14.100	—N/a	—N/a	41.700	—N/a
Total	Team	40.500	37.350	39.450	40.750	40.650	38.300	237.000	2nd place, silver medalist(s)

Individual finals

Athlete	Event	Apparatus						Total	Rank
Athlete	Event	F	PH	R	V	PB	HB	Total	Rank
Tommaso Brugnami	All around	13.950	12.250	12.300	14.150	12.600	12.750	78.000	6
Ivan Brunello	All around	12.650	12.600	12.800	13.200	12.950	13.600	77.800	7
Niccolo Vannucchi	Floor	13.600	—N/a					13.600	3rd place, bronze medalist(s)
Ivan Brunello	Floor	13.600	—N/a					13.600	2nd place, silver medalist(s)
Niccolo Vannucchi	Rings	—N/a		13.850	—N/a			13.850	2nd place, silver medalist(s)
Ivan Brunello	Rings	—N/a		12.650	—N/a			12.650	8
Tommaso Brugnami	Vault	—N/a			13.900	—N/a		13.900	2nd place, silver medalist(s)
Niccolo Vannucchi	Vault	—N/a			13.750	—N/a		13.750	4
Matteo Levantesi	Parallel bars	—N/a				13.900	—N/a	13.900	3rd place, bronze medalist(s)
Stefano Patron	Parallel bars	—N/a				13.450	—N/a	13.450	4
Matteo Levantesi	Horizontal bar	—N/a					12.450	12.450	4

Women
Team

Key:

- F - Floor
- V - Vault
- UB - Uneven bars
- BB - Balance beam

Athlete	Event	Final					
Athlete	Event	Apparatus				Total	Rank
Athlete	Event	F	V	UB	BB	Total	Rank
Eleonora Calaciura	Team	—N/a		12.200	12.900	25.100	—N/a
Benedetta Gava	Team	13.050	14.100	12.300	12.150	51.600	—N/a
Artemisia Iorfino	Team	12.250	13.150	13.800	12.450	51.650	—N/a
Sofia Tonelli	Team	13.200	13.200	12.950	13.200	52.550	—N/a
Emma Fioravanti	Team	13.450	13.150	—N/a		26.600	—N/a
Angela Andreoli	Team	—N/a					
Total	Team	39.700	40.450	39.050	38.550	157.750	1st place, gold medalist(s)

Individual finals

Athlete	Event	Apparatus				Total	Rank
Athlete	Event	F	V	UB	BB	Total	Rank
Sofia Tonelli	All around	13.250	13.700	13.100	11.600	51.650	3rd place, bronze medalist(s)
Artemisia Iorfino	All around	11.600	13.250	13.950	12.600	51.400	4
Benedetta Gava	Vault	—N/a	13.675	—N/a		13.675	1st place, gold medalist(s)
Artemisia Iorfino	Uneven bars	—N/a		13.800	—N/a	13.800	3rd place, bronze medalist(s)
Sofia Tonelli	Uneven bars	—N/a		14.100	—N/a	14.100	2nd place, silver medalist(s)
Sofia Tonelli	Balance beam	—N/a			12.200	12.200	5
Eleonora Calaciura	Balance beam	—N/a			12.900	12.900	3rd place, bronze medalist(s)
Emma Fioravanti	Floor	12.800	—N/a			12.800	3rd place, bronze medalist(s)
Benedetta Gava	Floor	13.300	—N/a			13.300	1st place, gold medalist(s)

== Athletics ==
Key

- Note – Ranks given for track events are within the athlete's heat only
- Q = Qualified for the next round
- q = Qualified for the next round as a fastest loser or, in field events, by position without achieving the qualifying target
- NR = National record
- N/A = Round not applicable for the event
- Bye = Athlete not required to compete in round

Men
Track & road events

Athlete	Event	Semifinal		Final	
Athlete	Event	Result	Rank	Result	Rank
Roberto Rigali	100 m	10.64	5 q	10.72	8
Eric Marek	100 m	10.47	2 Q	10.41	2nd place, silver medalist(s)
Filippo Tortu	200 m	20.86	4	Did not advance	
Filippo Dezza	200 m	20.44	2 Q	20.22	2nd place, silver medalist(s)
Lorenzo Benati	400 m	45.54	1 Q	45.32	3rd place, bronze medalist(s)
Luca Sito	400 m	45.46	3 q	45.74	6
Catalin Tecuceanu	800 m	1:46.53	4 q	1:47.10	7
Giovanni Lazzaro	800 m	1:47.43	5	Did not advance	
Joao Bussotti	1500 m	—N/a		3:43.96	7
Pietro Arese	1500 m	—N/a		3:43.29	4
Ala Zoghlami	3000 m	—N/a		8:55.80	7
Osama Zoghlami	3000 m	—N/a		DNS	
Konjoneh Maggi	5000 m	—N/a		14:47.80	9
Sebastiano Parolini	5000 m	—N/a		14:44.84	8
Thomas D’Este	10000 m	—N/a		29:24.86	5
Oliver Mulas	110 m hurdles	14.48	5	Did not advance	
Alessandro Silipo	400 m hurdles	49.57	2 Q	51.54	7
Pasquale Selvarolo	Half marathon	—N/a		1:05.27	4

Field events

Athlete	Event	Qualification		Final	
Athlete	Event	Result	Rank	Result	Rank
Matteo Oliveri	Pole vault	—N/a		5.65	3rd place, bronze medalist(s)
Gianmarco Tamberi	High jump	—N/a		2.25	1st place, gold medalist(s)
Christian Falocchi	High jump	—N/a		2.15	3rd place, bronze medalist(s)
Francesco Inzoli	Long jump	—N/a		8.19	1st place, gold medalist(s)
Alex Fabbri	Triple Jump	—N/a		15.98	5
Federico Lorenzo Bruno	Triple Jump	—N/a		16.16	2nd place, silver medalist(s)
Michele Fina	Javelin throw	—N/a		77.41	2nd place, silver medalist(s)
Giovanni Frattini	Javelin throw	—N/a		81.59	1st place, gold medalist(s)
Riccardo Ferrara	Shot put	—N/a		19.08	7
Nick Ponzio	Shot put	—N/a		21.21	1st place, gold medalist(s)
Davide Costa	Hammer throw	—N/a		72.25	6
Giorgio Oliveri	Hammer throw	—N/a		71.48	8
Alessio Mannucci	Discus throw	—N/a		63.89	3rd place, bronze medalist(s)
Enrico Saccomano	Discus throw	—N/a		60.53	6

Women
Track & road events

Athlete	Event	Semifinal		Final	
Athlete	Event	Result	Rank	Result	Rank
Gloria Hooper	100 m	11.75	3 Q	11.45	4
Alessia Pavese	100 m	11.60	2 Q	11.49	5
Vittoria Fontana	200 m	23.16	2 Q	22.93	1st place, gold medalist(s)
Elena Cambiolo	200 m	23.68	3 Q	23.52	6
Alice Mangione	400 m	52.06	2 Q	51.49	3rd place, bronze medalist(s)
Alessandra Bonora	400 m	52.05	3 Q	51.41	2nd place, silver medalist(s)
Maria Colajanni	800 m	—N/a		2:01.33	6
Ngalula Gloria Kabangu	800 m	—N/a		2:01.69	8
Ludovica Cavalli	1500 m	—N/a		4:18.37	6
Gaia Colli	3000 m	—N/a		10:26.32	9
Federica Del Buono	5000 m	—N/a		15:31.32	5
Micol Majori	5000 m	—N/a		15:21.86	2nd place, silver medalist(s)
Federica Del Buono	10000 m	—N/a		35:02.28	1st place, gold medalist(s)
Elena Carraro	100 m hurdles	13.28	2 Q	12.79	2nd place, silver medalist(s)
Celeste Polzonetti	100 m hurdles	13.29	1 Q	12.75	1st place, gold medalist(s)
Ayomide Folorunso	400 m hurdles	55.43	1 Q	54.22	1st place, gold medalist(s)
Alice Muraro	400 m hurdles	57.10	2 Q	54.95	3rd place, bronze medalist(s)
Greta Settino	Half marathon	—N/a		1:15.13	8

Field events

Athlete	Event	Qualification		Final	
Athlete	Event	Result	Rank	Result	Rank
Sonia Malavisi	Pole vault	—N/a		4.45	3rd place, bronze medalist(s)
Elisa Molinarolo	Pole vault	—N/a		4.35	4
Marta Morara	High jump	—N/a		1.80	9
Idea Pieroni	High jump	—N/a		1.90	3rd place, bronze medalist(s)
Greta Brugnolo	Long jump	—N/a		6.26	7
Arianna Battistella	Long jump	—N/a		6.45	3rd place, bronze medalist(s)
Greta Brugnolo	Triple Jump	—N/a		12.95	6
Erika Saraceni	Triple Jump	—N/a		14.21	1st place, gold medalist(s)
Paola Padovan	Javelin throw	—N/a		50.60	11
Adele Toniutto	Javelin throw	—N/a		55.71	9
Anita Nalesso	Shot put	—N/a		16.57	4
Sara Verteramo	Shot put	—N/a		16.79	3rd place, bronze medalist(s)
Sara Fantini	Hammer throw	—N/a		73.03	1st place, gold medalist(s)
Rachele Mori	Hammer throw	—N/a		61.23	8
Benedetta Benedetti	Discus throw	—N/a		55.59	7
Daisy Osakue	Discus throw	—N/a		60.96	2nd place, silver medalist(s)

Relay

Athlete	Event	Qualification		Final	
Athlete	Event	Result	Rank	Result	Rank
Lorenzo Ianes; Damiano Dentato; Filippo Randazzo; Filippo Cappelletti	Men's 4x100	—N/a		39.03	1st place, gold medalist(s)
Federico Falsetti; Riccardo Meli; Lapo Bianciardi; Luca Sito	Men's 4x400	—N/a		3:02.73	3rd place, bronze medalist(s)
Rachele Torchio; Dalia Kaddari; Alessia Pavese; Alice Pagliarini	Women's 4x100	—N/a		DNF	
Clarissa Vianelli; Sara Cirillo; Ginevra Ricci; Ilaria Elvira Accame	Women's 4x400	—N/a		3:29.89	1st place, gold medalist(s)
Erik Marek; Alice Pagliarini; Dalia Kaddari; Filippo Cappelletti	4x100 metres mixed relay	—N/a		40.98	1st place, gold medalist(s)
Federico Falsetti; Sara Cirillo; Riccardo Meli; Ilaria Elvira Accame	4x400 metres mixed relay	—N/a		3:14.89	2nd place, silver medalist(s)

== Badminton ==
Italy competed in badminton.

Athlete	Event	Round of 32	Round of 16	Quarter-final	Semi-final	Final / BM	
Athlete	Event	Opposition Score	Opposition Score	Opposition Score	Opposition Score	Opposition Score	Rank
Giovanni Toti	Men's singles	Bye	Sarac (TUR); W 2-0	Cassar (MLT); W 2-0	Dinata (CRO); L 0-2	Did not advance	3rd place, bronze medalist(s)
Fabio Caponio	Men's singles	Bye	Kattirtzi Ranjbar (CYP); W 2-0	Marreiros Gloria (POR); W 2-1	Abian (ESP); W 2-0	Dinata (CRO); W 2-0	1st place, gold medalist(s)
Giovanni Toti; Fabio Caponio	Men's double	—N/a	Franco Castilla / Sanjurjo Rivas (ESP); L 0-2	Did not advance			
Matteo Massetti; David Salutt	Men's double	—N/a	Anastasiou / Papadopoulos (GRE); W 2-0	Aktas / Sonmez (TUR); L 0-2	Did not advance		
Yasmine Hamza	Women's singles	Bye	Michael (CYP); W 2-0	Buchberger (CRO); W 2-1	Sotiriou (GRE); W 2-1	Arin (TUR); L 0-2	2nd place, silver medalist(s)
Gianna Stiglich Guzman	Women's singles	Bye	Clark (MLT); W 2-0	Huet (FRA); L 1-2	Did not advance		
Yasmine Hamza; Gianna Stiglich	Women's double	—N/a	Bye	Erçetin / İnci (TUR); L 0-2	Did not advance		
Martina Fasai Corsini; Emma Piccinin	Women's double	—N/a	Bye	Cuevas / Jacob (FRA); L 0-2	Did not advance		
Matteo Massetti; Emma Piccinin	Mixed double	Haxhiu / Keka (KOS)	Abdelhalim/ Kamal Moh (EGY); L 1-2	Did not advance			
Martina Fasai Corsini; David Salutt	Mixed double	Cassar / Clark (MLT); W 2-0	Ivancic / Jordan (SLO); W 2-0	Bektas / Sonmez (TUR); L 1-2	Did not advance		

== Boules ==
Italy competed in boules.

Lyonnaise

Athlete	Event	Heats				Semifinals	Final / BM	
Athlete	Event	Heat 1	Heat 2	Total	Rank	Opposition Score	Opposition Score	Rank
Matteo Mana	Men's precision throw	14	17	31	3 Q	Stjepcevic (MNE); W 21-19	Zouaoui (TUN); L 9-11	2nd place, silver medalist(s)
Marika Depretis	Women's precision throw	9	10	19	5	Did not advance		
Diego Verganti	Men's progressive shooting	44	47	91	3 Q	Milicevic (CRO); L 43-46	Hiti (SLO); T 44-44	3rd place, bronze medalist(s)
Gaia Gamba	Women's progressive shooting	28	30	58	3 Q	Turker (TUR); L28-35	Vojkovic (CRO); W 31-29	3rd place, bronze medalist(s)

Pétanque

Athlete	Event	Preliminary round				Semifinals	Final / BM	
Athlete	Event	Round 1	Rank	Round 2	Rank	Opposition Score	Opposition Score	Rank
Diego Rizzi	Men's precision throw	36	4	44	1 Q	Bougriba (TUN); W 49-35	Luque Gonzalez (ESP); W 44-30	1st place, gold medalist(s)
Sara Ferrara	Women's precision throw	20	4	31	2 Q	Valiente Quereda (ESP); L 19-24	Beji Tun (TUN); L 40-43	4

Athlete	Event	Group stage			Semifinals	Final / BM	
Athlete	Event	Opposition Score	Opposition Score	Rank	Opposition Score	Opposition Score	Rank
Diego Rizzi; Andrea Chiapello	Men's doubles	Bougriba/ Hammami (TUN); W 13-4	Luque Gonzalez/ Ruiz Alvarez (ESP); W 4-2	1	Cousin/ Sarrio (FRA); W10-6	Luque Gonzalez/ Ruiz Alvarez (ESP); W 9-4	1st place, gold medalist(s)
Sara Ferrara; Donatella Greco	Women's doubles	Peyre/ Tairio (FRA); L 3-4	Morkoyun/ Oguz (TUR); L 5-9	6	Did not advance		

Raffa

Athlete	Event	Preliminary round				Quarterfinals	Semifinals	Final / BM	
Athlete	Event	Opposition Score	Opposition Score	Opposition Score	Rank	Opposition Score	Opposition Score	Opposition Score	Rank
Alfonso Nanni	Men's raffa single	Zanto (LBA); W 6-5	Zure (CRO); L 5-10	Frisoni (SMR); L 4-8	3	Did not advance			
Laura Picchio	Women's raffa single	Paoletti (SMR); L 6-7	Dabboussi (TUN); W 8-4	Kalanc (TUR); W 8-2	2	—N/a	Maidi (ALG); W 10-2	Juginovic (SRB); W 7-4	1st place, gold medalist(s)

Athlete	Event	Group stage			Quarterfinals	Semifinals	Final / BM	
Athlete	Event	Opposition Score	Opposition Score	Rank	Opposition Score	Opposition Score	Opposition Score	Rank
Alfonso Nanni; Luca Viscusi	Men's doubles	Jouini / Saidi (TUN); W 9-4	Corbihan / Rouault (FRA); W 9-1	1	—N/a	Piric / Zure (CRO); L 5-6	Alswedi/ Zanto (LBA); W 7-6	3rd place, bronze medalist(s)
Laura Picchio; Kety Crescenzi	Women's doubles	Coric / Juginovic (CRO); W 6-5	Accasto / Esparron (FRA); L 0-7	1	—N/a	G. Paoletti / S. Paoletti (SMR); W 7-4	Coric / Juginovic (CRO); W 9-8	1st place, gold medalist(s)

== Boxing ==
Italy competed in boxing.

Men

Athlete	Event	Round of 16	Quarterfinals	Semifinals	Final	
Athlete	Event	Opposition Result	Opposition Result	Opposition Result	Opposition Result	Rank
Tommaso Sciacca	Bantamweight	Bajoku (KOS); W 3-2	Lozano Serrano (ESP); L 1-4	Did not advance		
Michele Baldassi	Lightweight	Allaoui (ALG); W 4-1	Djemmal (FRA); W ABD	Cinar (TUR); L 0-4	Did not advance	3rd place, bronze medalist(s)
Davide Fiore	Light welterweight	Bekhsis (ALG); L 2-3	Did not advance			
Gabriele Guidi Rontani	Welterweight	Kartal (TUR); W DSQ	Roganovic (MNE); W 4-1	Nadir (MAR); W 5-0	Martínez Bernard (ESP); W 3-0	1st place, gold medalist(s)
Christian Sarsilli	Light heavyweight	Elsharkawi (EGY); W 5-0	Micic (BIH); W 5-0	Coy Bernal (ESP); L 1-4	Did not advance	3rd place, bronze medalist(s)
Paolo Caruso	Heavyweight	—N/a	Pizurica (SRB); L 2-3	Did not advance		
Mateo Meliho	Super heavyweight	—N/a	Akar (TUR); L 2-3	Did not advance		

Women

Athlete	Event	Quarterfinals	Semifinals	Final	
Athlete	Event	Opposition Result	Opposition Result	Opposition Result	Rank
Martina Vassallo	Light flyweight	Dzida (SRB); W 4-0	Mansouri (ALG); L 0-5	Did not advance	3rd place, bronze medalist(s)
Sirine Charaabi	Bantamweight	Cam (TUR); W 3-2	Cirkovic (SRB); W 3-2	Bertal (MAR); W 4-1	1st place, gold medalist(s)
Irma Testa	Featherweight	Shadrina (SRB); W wo	Gojkovic (MNE); W 5-0	Zidani (FRA); W 3-2	1st place, gold medalist(s)
Melissa Gemini	Middleweight	Larti (MAR); W 4-1	Aslan (TUR); W' 5-0	Abo (EGY); W 3-2	1st place, gold medalist(s)

== Canoeing ==
Italy competed in canoeing events.

Athlete	Event	Heats		Semifinals		Final	
Athlete	Event	Time	Rank	Time	Rank	Time	Rank
Samuele Veglianti	Men's C-1 1000 m	—N/a				4:19.560	1st place, gold medalist(s)
Giacomo Rossi	Men's K-1 1000 m	3:54.31	1 FA	—N/a		3:51.54	2nd place, silver medalist(s)
Giacomo Cinti; Alessio Campari	Men's K-2 500 m	1:34.94	2 FA	—N/a		1:30.89	3rd place, bronze medalist(s)
Elisa Voltan	Women's C-1 200 m	—N/a				47.97	1st place, gold medalist(s)
Giorgia Lacalamita	Women's K-1 500 m	2:00.57	4 QS	2:07.29	3 FA	2:06.40	7
Sophia Vianello; Sofia Zucca	Women's K-2 500 m	—N/a				1:49.16	2nd place, silver medalist(s)

Qualification Legend:QS= Qualify to Semifinals FA = Qualify to final (medal); FB = Qualify to final B (non-medal)

== Cycling Road ==
Italy competed in cycling road events.

Men

Athlete	Event	Time	Rank
Tommaso Dati	Road race	2:59:52	1st place, gold medalist(s)
Luca Giaimi	Road race	3:03:02	10
Federico Iacomoni	Road race	2:59:53	3rd place, bronze medalist(s)
Mirco Maestri	Road race	3:03:07	15
Luca Giaimi	Time trial	20:30.13	5
Mirco Maestri	Time trial	20:23.27	4

Women

Athlete	Event	Time	Rank
Rachele Barbieri	Road race	2:08:17	1st place, gold medalist(s)
Elena Cecchini	Road race	2:08:45	24
Martina Fidanza	Road race	2:08:17	2nd place, silver medalist(s)
Barbara Guarischi	Road race	2:08:17	3rd place, bronze medalist(s)
Elena Cecchini	Time trial	23:03.60	4
Martina Fidanza	Time trial	23:16.20	6

== Equestrian ==
Italy competed in equestrian.

=== Jumping ===
Athlete	Horse	Event	Qualification		Final	
Athlete	Horse	Event	Penalties	Rank	Penalties	Rank
Giacomo Bassi	Cape Cod	Individual	7	22	7	9
Emilio Bicocchi	Hemerald d'Argonne	Individual	4	10	16	26
Lorenzo Correddu	Dalakani Chardonnet	Individual	8	23	16	26
Matteo Zamana	Captain Conner	Individual	0	1	10	17
Giacomo Bassi; Emilio Bicocchi; Elisa Chimirri; Lorenzo Correddu	Cape Cod; Hemerald d'Argonne; Lorenzo; Dalakani Chardonnet	Team	0	1	11	4

== Fencing ==
Italy competed in fencing events.

Athlete	Event	Group Stage						Round of 32	Round of 16	Quarterfinal	Semifinal/ BM	Final	
Athlete	Event	Opposition Score	Opposition Score	Opposition Score	Opposition Score	Opposition Score	Rank	Opposition Score	Opposition Score	Opposition Score	Opposition Score	Opposition Score	Rank
Edoardo Cantini	Men's sabre	Fraboulet (FRA); L 1-5	Moataz (EGY); W 5-1	Madrigal (ESP); L 2-5	Yaman (TUR); L 3-5	—N/a	5	—N/a	Moataz (EGY); L 12-15	Did not advance			
Dario Cavaliere	Men's sabre	Kontoeidis (GRE); W 5-4	Choueiry (FRA); W 5-1	Hesham (EGY); L 4-5	Bounabi (ALG); W 5-0	Yıldırım (TUR); L 2-5	3	—N/a	Yaman (TUR); L 11-15	Did not advance			
Marco Mastrullo	Men's sabre	Ibrihen (ALG); W 5-2	Hospital (FRA); W 5-3	Krajnc (SLO); W 5-1	Ferjani (TUN); L 2-5	Kalender (TUR); W 5-1	2	—N/a	Bye	Yaman (TUR); L 8-15	Did not advance		
Filippo Armaleo	Men's épee	Elibol (TUR); L 4-5	Shamel (EGY); W 5-4	Wingerter (FRA); L 1-5	El Choueiry (LBN); L 4-5	Kraria (ALG); W 5-1	4	Taliotis (CYP); W 15-3	El-Sayed (EGY); L 11-12	Did not advance			
Valerio Cuomo	Men's épee	Bindas (FRA); L 3-5	Mari (ALB); W 5-4	Mohammedi (ALG); L 3-5	Elkord (MAR); W 5-2	Taliotis (CYP); W 5-1	2	Bye	Gavalda (ESP); W 15-11	El-Sayed (EGY); L 6-15	Did not advance		
Enrico Piatti	Men's épee	Theodoropoulos (GRE); L 2-5	Markota (CRO); W 5-3	Talib (LBA); W 5-0	El-Sayed (EGY); L 2-5	Bundaleski (MKD); W 5-2	3	Bundaleski (MKD); W 15-4	Boulière (FRA); W 15-9	Shamel (EGY); L 8-15	Did not advance		
Davide Filippi	Men's foil	Wakim (LBN); W 5-0	Chagnon (FRA); W 5-4	Breteau (ESP); W 5-1	Hamza (EGY); W 5-3	—N/a	1	—N/a	Bye	Breteau (ESP); W 15-9	Tolba (EGY); W15-14	Hamza (EGY); L 12-15	2nd place, silver medalist(s)
Giuseppe Franzoni	Men's foil	Kirtayl (TUR); W 5-3	Tolba (EGY); W 5-3	Tofalides (CYP); W 5-3	Heroui (ALG); W 5-4	Antoine Spichinger (EGY); W 5-0	1	—N/a	Bye	Tolba (EGY); L 7-15	Did not advance		
Giulio Lombardi	Men's foil	Roger (FRA); W 5-3	Cuk (SRB); W 5-1	Kontochristopoulos (GRE); W 5-2	Spoljar (CRO); W 5-1	—N/a	1	—N/a	Bye	Roger (FRA); W 15-6	Hamza (EGY); L 9-15	—N/a	3rd place, bronze medalist(s)
Giulia Arpino	Women's sabre	Boungab (ALG) w/o	Manga (FRA); W 5-3	Martín-Portugués (ESP); L 1-5	Daghfous (TUN); W 5-1	—N/a	2	Kehli (ALG); W 15-12	Navarro (ESP); L 11-15	Did not advance			
Carlotta Fusetti	Women's sabre	Erbil (TUR); W 5-3	Gkountoura (GRE); W 5-4	Kehli (ALG); L1-5	Berder (FRA); L 2-5	—N/a	4	Gkountoura (GRE); L 14-15	Did not advance				
Chiara Mormile	Women's sabre	Gungor (TUR); W 5-2	Vongsavady (FRA); W 1-5	Navarro (ESP); W 5-2	Georgiadou (GRE); W 5-2	—N/a	1	Bye	Vongsavady (FRA); L 10-15	Did not advance			
Roberta Marzani	Women's épee	Cebe (TUR); W 5-0	Francillonne (FRA); W 5-0	Theodoropoulou (GRE); W 5-4	Boukhelifa (ALG) n.d.	—N/a	1	—N/a	Bye	Parmesani (SLO); W 15-8	Ertürk (TUR); W 15-11	Pinyol Tomas (ESP); W 15-14	1st place, gold medalist(s)
Lucrezia Paulis	Women's épee	Pinyol Tomas (ESP); W 5-4	Larbi Bouaouina (ALG); W 5-1	Mavrikiou (CYP); W 5-2	Vanryssel (FRA); W 5-1	—N/a	1	—N/a	Bye	Pinyol Tomas (ESP); L 8-15	Did not advance		
Gaia Traditi	Women's épee	Ertürk (TUR); L 2-5	Parmesani (SLO); W 5-4	Zebboudj (ALG); W 5-1	Nabeth (FRA); L 3-4	Abou Jaoude (LBN); W 5-2	4	—N/a	Pinyol Tomas (ESP); L 10-15	Did not advance			
Irene Bertini	Women's foil	Chaldaiou (GRE); W 5-1	Soussi (TUN); W 5-1	Atmaca (TUR); W 5-0	Audibert (FRA); L 3-5	—N/a	1	—N/a	Bye	Molinari (ITA); W 15-10	Amr Hossni (EGY); L 13-15	—N/a	3rd place, bronze medalist(s)
Matilde Molinari	Women's foil	B'chir (TUN); W 5-2	Catarzi (FRA); W 5-4	Kontochristopoulou (GRE); W 5-1	Amr Hossni (EGY); L 2-5	—N/a	2	—N/a	Aye (FRA); W 13-12	Bertini (ITA); L 10-15	Did not advance		
Francesca Palumbo	Women's foil	Aye (FRA); W 5-3	Mecherek (TUN); W 5-3	Blazic (CRO); W 5-4	Tucker (ESP); W 5-4	—N/a	1	—N/a	Bye	Kontochristopoulou (GRE); L 8-15	Did not advance		

== Finswimming ==
Men

Athlete	Event	Heat		Final	
Athlete	Event	Time	Rank	Time	Rank
Fabio Biancalana	50 m apnoea	15.21	5 q	15.17	8
Filippo Naldi	50 m apnoea	15.64	6	Did not advance	
Fabio Biancalana	100 m surface	36.67	3 q	36.40	4
Leonardo Spelta	100 m surface	38.01	5	Did not advance	
Lorenzo Caronno	200 m surface	1:26.08	3 q	1:22.33	1st place, gold medalist(s)
Christian Degli Esposti	200 m surface	DSQ		Did not advance	
Lorenzo Caronno	400 m surface	3:09.55	2 q	3:04.14	2nd place, silver medalist(s)
Christian Degli Esposti	400 m surface	3:10.36	3 q	3:11.10	7
Marco Orsi	50 m bi-fins	19.06	1 q	19.30	4
Filippo Pavoni	50 m bi-fins	19.33	3 q	18.89	2nd place, silver medalist(s)
Matteo Gadignani	100 m bi-fins	44.24	4 q	43.46	4
Filippo Pavoni	100 m bi-fins	43.56	1 q	42.06	1st place, gold medalist(s)
Riccardo Porciani	200 m bi-fins	1:42.38	4 q	1:36.58	2nd place, silver medalist(s)
Valter Prampolini	200 m bi-fins	1:40.71	3 q	1:37.34	5
Paolo De Pasquale	400 m bi-fins	3:37.97	2 q	3:35.70	3rd place, bronze medalist(s)
Valter Prampolini	400 m bi-fins	3:38.34	3 q	3:35.70	3rd place, bronze medalist(s)

Women

Athlete	Event	Heat		Final	
Athlete	Event	Time	Rank	Time	Rank
Giulia Bruni	50 m apnoea	16.90	2 q	16.90	5
Nicole Lunghi	50 m apnoea	17.28	4 q	17.16	6
Giulia Bruni	100 m surface	40.91	1 q	40.33	2nd place, silver medalist(s)
Anna Raffaetà	100 m surface	41.97	4 q	42.15	6
Anna Leonardi	200 m surface	1:34.37	2 q	1:31.57	2nd place, silver medalist(s)
Consuelo Dametto	200 m surface	1:35.10	3 q	1:33.86	5
Consuelo Dametto	400 m surface	3:29.07	3 q	3:31.61	7
Anna Leonardi	400 m surface	3:25.98	2 q	3:26.70	4
Viola Magoga	50 m bi-fins	22.47	1 q	21.91	1st place, gold medalist(s)
Celeste Simioni	50 m bi-fins	23.02	2 q	22.73	4
Giorgia Destefani	100 m bi-fins	50.46	4 q	49.84	4
Viola Magoga	100 m bi-fins	49.70	1 q	48.18	1st place, gold medalist(s)
Elettra Calanca	200 m bi-fins	1:50.15	1 q	1:48.19	2nd place, silver medalist(s)
Laura Franchin	200 m bi-fins	1:51.73	5	Did not advance	
Elettra Calanca	400 m bi-fins	3:59.66	3 Q	3:51.50	1st place, gold medalist(s)
Laura Franchin	400 m bi-fins	3:57.93	1 Q	3:53.17	2nd place, silver medalist(s)

Mixed

Athlete	Event	Heat		Final	
Athlete	Event	Time	Rank	Time	Rank
Filippo Pavoni; Giulia Bruni; Marco Orsi; Viola Magoga	4x50 m bi-fins	—N/a		1:19.74	1st place, gold medalist(s)
Fabio Biancalana; Anna Raffaetà; Leonardo Spelta; Giulia Bruni	4x100 m surface	—N/a		2:34.14	2nd place, silver medalist(s)

== Football ==
Italy competed in football.

Summary

Key:

- A.E.T – After extra time.
- P – Match decided by penalty-shootout.

Team	Event	Group Stage					Semifinal	Final / BM	
Team	Event	Opposition Score	Opposition Score	Opposition Score	Opposition Score	Rank	Opposition Score	Opposition Score	Rank
Italy Men's	Men's tournament	—N/a	Albania; T 1-1	Algeria; L 1-3	Kosovo; W 3-0	2 Q	Tunisia; L 1-3	Morocco; L 1-4	4
Italy women's	Women's tournament	Kosovo; W 4-1	Slovenia; T 1-1	Morocco; W 3-1	Portugal; T 1-1	2 Q	—N/a	Portugal; L	2nd place, silver medalist(s)

== Handball ==
Italy competed in handball.

Summary

Key:

- A.E.T – After extra time.
- P – Match decided by penalty-shootout.

Team	Event	Group Stage						Quarterfinal	Semifinal	Final / BM	
Team	Event	Opposition Score	Opposition Score	Opposition Score	Opposition Score	Opposition Score	Rank	Opposition Score	Opposition Score	Opposition Score	Rank
Italy men's	Men's tournament	Kosovo; W 39-23	Portugal; L 30-31	Egypt; L 22-25	—N/a		3	Did not advance			
Italy women's	Women's tournament	Tunisia; L 22-25	Algeria; W 27-17	Kosovo; W 38-21	North Macedonia; W 39-19	Greece; W 27-24	2 Q	—N/a		Tunisia; W 25-23	1st place, gold medalist(s)

== Judo ==
Italy competed in judo.

Men

Athlete	Event	Round of 16	Quarterfinals	Semifinals	Repechage 1	Repechage 2	Final / BM	
Athlete	Event	Opposition Result	Opposition Result	Opposition Result	Opposition Result	Opposition Result	Opposition Result	Rank
Andrea Carlino	Men's 60 kg	—N/a	Motoly-Bongambé (FRA); L Yuko (1-3)	Did not advance	Bye	Ben Laribi (ALG); W Ippon (101-10)	Yildiz (TUR); L Penalty (0-100)	5
Valerio Accogli	Men's 66 kg	Bye	Jorgic (SRB); L Yuko (0-1)	Did not advance	Mucik (TUR); W Waza-ari (10-0)	Moudetere (ALG); W Penalty (100-0)	Nieto Chinarro (ESP); W Yuko (1-0)	3rd place, bronze medalist(s)
Fabrizio Esposito	Men's 73 kg	Gkinis (GRE); W Yuko (3-0)	Dris (ALG); L Yuko (0-1)	Did not advance	Bye	Hojak (SLO); L Waza-ari (0-10)	Did not advance	
Manuel Parlati	Men's 81 kg	Sousa Do Carmo Fernando (POR); L Yuko (0-1)	Did not advance		Hebib (BIH); L Ippon (0-100)	Did not advance		
Christian Parlati	Men's 90 kg	Bye	Miletic (BIH); W Ippon (100-0)	Nieto Trinidad (ESP); W Ippon (100-0)	—N/a		Mitrovic (FRA); L Ippon (1-101)	2nd place, silver medalist(s)
Jean Carletti	Men's 100 kg	Bertalanič Žižek (SLO); W Waza-ari (11-0)	Elra (EGY); L Ippon (0-101)	Did not advance	Bye	Damier (FRA); L Yuko (0-1)	Did not advance	
Kwadjo Anani	Men's +100 kg	Hussein (EGY); W Ippon (100-0)	Giannis Antoniou (CYP); W Ippon (100-1)	Lili (ALG); W Ippon (100-0)	—N/a		Tataroglu (TUR); L Ippon (0-100)	2nd place, silver medalist(s)

Women

Athlete	Event	Round of 16	Quarterfinals	Semifinals	Repechage 1	Repechage 2	Final / BM	
Athlete	Event	Opposition Result	Opposition Result	Opposition Result	Opposition Result	Opposition Result	Opposition Result	Rank
Giulia Ghiglione	Women's 48 kg	—N/a	Muminoviq (KOS); W Ippon (100-0)	Bedioui (TUN); L Waza-ari (0-11)	—N/a		Annis (FRA); W Yuko (0-1)	3rd place, bronze medalist(s)
Gaia Stella	Women's 52 kg	—N/a	Guebli (ALG); W Penalty (100-0)	Iraoui (MAR); L Yuko (0-1)	—N/a		Kasapi (KOS); L Yuko (0-1)	5
Michela Terranova	Women's 57 kg	Gordo Agulhas (POR); W Penalty (101-0)	Loxha (KOS); L Yuko (0-1)	Did not advance	Bye	Samardzic (BIH); W Ippon (100-0)	Rodríguez Salvador (ESP); W Ippon (100-11)	3rd place, bronze medalist(s)
Carlotta Avanzato	Women's 63 kg	Bye	Jmour (TUN); W Waza-ari (12-0)	Vasquez Fernandez (ESP); W Waza-ari (11-1)	—N/a		Fazliu (KOS); W Yuko (1-0)	1st place, gold medalist(s)
Irene Pedrotti	Women's 70 kg	—N/a	Darbes Takam (FRA); W Waza-ARI (10-2)	Andric (SRB); L Yuko (0-2)	—N/a		Koren (SLO); L Yuko (0-2)	5
Claudia Sperotti	Women's 78 kg	Bousbaa Dab (ESP); W Waza-ari (10-1)	Lobnik (SLO); L Ippon (0-101)	Did not advance	Bye	Stjepanovic (SRB); L Waza-ari (0-10)	Did not advance	
Asya Tavano	Women's +78 kg	—N/a	Ozturk (TUR); W Ippon (100-0)	Soliman (EGY); W Waza-ari (10-1)	—N/a		Vukovic (CRO); L Ippon (0-100)	2nd place, silver medalist(s)

Mixed

Athlete	Event	Round of 16	Quarterfinals	Semifinals	Repechage 1	Repechage 2	Final / BM	
Athlete	Event	Opposition Result	Opposition Result	Opposition Result	Opposition Result	Opposition Result	Opposition Result	Rank
Fabrizio Esposito; Manuel Parlati; Christian Parlati; Jean Carletti; Valerio Accogli; Kwadjo Anani; Carlotta Avanzato; Irene Pedrotti; Michela Terranova; Asya Tavano; Claudia Sperotti; Gaia Stella	Mixed Team	Bye	Spain; W 4-2	Turkey; W 4-1	—N/a		France; W 4-1	1st place, gold medalist(s)

== Karate ==
Italy competed in karate.

Kumite
Men

Athlete	Event	Round of 16	Quarterfinals	Semifinals	Repechage1	Repechage2	Final	
Athlete	Event	Opposition Result	Opposition Result	Opposition Result	Opposition Result	Opposition Result	Opposition Result	Rank
Christian Sabatino	Men's - 60 kg	Xenos (GRE); L 0-7	Did not advance					
Luca Maresca	Men's - 67 kg	Ahmed O (EGY); W 3-3	Beljstojanovski (MKD); L 0-2	Did not advance	Bye	Almasalmeh (SYR); W 4-0	Baliotis (GRE); W 11-9	3rd place, bronze medalist(s)
Daniele De Vivo	Men's - 75 kg	Zaid (ALG); W 2-0	Just Clopes (ESP); W 5-4	Yurur (ALG); L 2-7	—N/a		Bani Almarjeh (SYR); W 8-0	3rd place, bronze medalist(s)
Matteo Fiore	Men's - 84 kg	Lardjoum (FRA); W 2-2	Badawy (EGY); L 1-8	Did not advance				
Matteo Avanzini	Men's + 84 kg	Stojanovikj (MKD); W 2-1	Mahmoud (EGY); L1-4	Did not advance	—N/a	Shabani (KOS); W KIKEN	Aktaş (TUR); L 6-7	5

Women

Athlete	Event	Round of 16	Quarterfinals	Semifinals	Repechage	Final	
Athlete	Event	Opposition Result	Opposition Result	Opposition Result	Opposition Result	Opposition Result	Rank
Erminia Perfetto	Women's - 50 kg	Sgardelli (CRO); W 6-0	Asfoura (SYR); W 5-3	Pappa (GRE); W 3-2	—N/a	Ouikene (ALG); L 3-9	2nd place, silver medalist(s)
Veronica Brunori	Women's - 55 kg	Youssef (EGY); W 6-0	Lorenzo Couso (ESP); W 7-2	Abdesselem (FRA); W 9-0	—N/a	Elhayti (MAR); L 2-3	2nd place, silver medalist(s)
Alessandra Mangiacarpa	Women's - 61 kg	Kyprianou (CYP); W 9-1	Tolba (EGY); L 3-9	Did not advance	Zorko (CRO); W 8-7	Arzumian (FRA); W 5-4	3rd place, bronze medalist(s)
Silvia Semeraro	Women's - 68 kg	Qerimi (KOS); W 8-1	Eltemur (TUR); W 3-0	Becirovic (CRO); W 3-2	—N/a	Abelaziz (EGY); L 0-2	2nd place, silver medalist(s)
Clio Ferracuti	Women's + 68 kg	Çekiç (TUR); L 7-8	Did not advance				

== Padel ==
Italy entered 8 athletes into the tournament.

Men

Athlete	Event	Round of 32	Round of 16	Quarterfinals	Semifinals	Final / BM	
Athlete	Event	Opposition Score	Opposition Score	Opposition Score	Opposition Score	Opposition Score	Rank
Marco Cassetta; Simone Iacovino	Men's Pairs	Bye	Alami/ El Amrani (MAR); W 2-0	Hossam/ Wakim (EGY); W 2-0	Abbate /Caruso (ITA); L 0-2	N. Deus /M. Deus (POR); W 2-1	3rd place, bronze medalist(s)
Flavio Abbate; Alvaro Montiel Caruso	Men's Pairs	Bye	Curri/ Naska (ALB); W 2-0	Blanque/ Guichard (FRA); W 2-0	Cassetta /Iacovino (ITA); W 2-0	Diestro /Gala (ESP); L 0-2	2nd place, silver medalist(s)

Women

Athlete	Event	Round of 32	Round of 16	Quarterfinals	Semifinals	Final / BM	
Athlete	Event	Opposition Score	Opposition Score	Opposition Score	Opposition Score	Opposition Score	Rank
Carolina Orsi; Giorgia Marchetti	Women's pairs	Bye	Elh/ Bassiou (EGY); W 2-0	Bahurel/ Pothieras (FRA); W 2-0	Llaguno Zielinski/ Sainz Pelegri (ESP); L 0-2	Araujo/ Nogueira (POR); W 2-1	3rd place, bronze medalist(s)
Carlotta Casali; Giulia Dal Pozzo	Women's pairs	Bye	Savva/ Siopacha (CYP); W 2-0	Araujo/ Nogueira (POR); L 0-2	Did not advance		

Mixed

Athlete	Event	Round of 16	Quarterfinals	Semifinals	Final / BM	
Athlete	Event	Opposition Score	Opposition Score	Opposition Score	Opposition Score	Rank
Marco Cassetta; Giulia Dal Pozzo	Mixed pairs	Bye	Bashota/ Krasniqi (KOS); W 2-0	Bahurel/ Guichard (FRA); W 2-0	Araujo/ Araujo (POR); L 1-2	2nd place, silver medalist(s)

== Rhythmic gymnastics ==
Italy competed in rhythmic gymnastics.

Athlete	Event	Qualification						Final					
Athlete	Event	Hoop	Clubs	Ball	Ribbon	Total	Rank	Hoop	Clubs	Ball	Ribbon	Total	Rank
Viola Sella	All around	25.250	27.200	25.500	26.150	78.850	5 Q	28.050	25.650	26.050	25.950	105.700	3rd place, bronze medalist(s)
Margherita Fucci	All around	26.050	26.500	25.000	26.450	79.000	4 Q	27.350	26.350	26.450	25.100	105.250	4

== Roller Marathon ==
Italy entered 6 athletes into the competition.

Athlete	Event	Final	
Athlete	Event	Time	Rank
Daniel Niero	Men's	1:10:26.916	7
Alessio Clementoni	Men's	1:10:26.779	6
Giuseppe Bramante	Men's	1:10:27.091	9
Melissa Gatti	Women's	1:23:15.628	1st place, gold medalist(s)
Sofia Saronni	Women's	1:23:15.783	3rd place, bronze medalist(s)
Julia Bedon	Women's	1:23:20.119	6

== Rowing ==
Italy has ten boats in the competition.

Athlete	Event	Semifinals		Final	
Athlete	Event	Time	Rank	Time	Rank
Edoardo Rocchi	Men's single sculls	7:09.01	3 fA	7:31.03	5
Luca Borgonovo	Men's lightweight single sculls	7:04.28	2 FA	7:29.40	3rd place, bronze medalist(s)
Gaia Umbra Chiavini	Women's single sculls	7:54.81	3 fA	8:14.67	4
Giulia Grandi	Women's lightweight single sculls	8:22.22	3	Did not advance	
Josef Marvucic; Marco Prati	Men's doube sculls	6:21.36	2 FA	6:28.57	2nd place, silver medalist(s)
Tito Christoforakis; Giovanni Borgonovo	Men's lightweight doube sculls	6:39.22	2 FA	6:31.53	1st place, gold medalist(s)
Aurora Spirito; Sara Borghi	Women's doube sculls	7:25.82	4 FA	7:23.79	3rd place, bronze medalist(s)
Elena Sali; Melissa Schincariol	Women's lightweight doube sculls	7:32.00	2 FA	7:12.05	1st place, gold medalist(s)
Leonardo Tedoldi; Irene Gattiglia	Mixed double sculls	7:15.69	2 FA	7:08.14	3rd place, bronze medalist(s)
Niccolò Gandola; Chiara Cobalchini	Mixed lightweight double sculls	7:35.16	3 FA	7:08.67	2nd place, silver medalist(s)

== Sailing ==
Athlete	Event	Race																	Final rank
Athlete	Event	1	2	3	4	5	6	7	8	9	10	11	12	13	14	15	TOT	PTS	Final rank
Federico Alan Pilloni	Men's IQFoil	1	1	3	1	5	2	~~13~~	2	3	3	3	2	1	4	5	49	31	2nd place, silver medalist(s)
Leonardo Tomasini	Men's IQFoil	3	2	1	2	1	1	4	~~6~~	1	2	1	1	2	1	3	31	21	1st place, gold medalist(s)
Medea Falcioni	Women's IQFoil	5	2	5	2	2	2	2	7	~~11~~	3	3	1	5	5	—N/a	54	37	2nd place, silver medalist(s)
Carola Colasanto	Women's IQFoil	6	3	1	1	3	4	3	8	4	1	2	7	~~9~~	6	—N/a	57	41	3rd place, bronze medalist(s)

Athlete	Event	Race											Net points	Final rank
Athlete	Event	1	2	3	4	5	6	7	8	9	10	11	Net points	Final rank
Antonio Pascali	Men's ILCA 7	1	9	5	6	~~13~~	4	4	5	9	4	12	61	5
Cesare Barabino	Men's ILCA 7	5	11	4	4	9	~~12~~	3	9	2	12	3	60	3rd place, bronze medalist(s)
Ginevra Caracciolo	Women's ILCA 6	7	11	11	8	11	1	~~12~~	3	9	8	2	71	6
Maria Vittoria Arseni	Women's ILCA 6	12	15	9	11	14	7	11	12	13	15	~~20~~	119	14

== Shooting ==
Italy competed in shooting.

Rifle & pistol
Men

Athlete	Event	Qualification		Final	
Athlete	Event	Points	Rank	Points	Rank
Edoardo Bonazzi	Men's 10 m air rifle	632.1	1 Q	143.8	7
Danilo Sollazzo	Men's 10 m air rifle	631.6	2 Q	249.9	1st place, gold medalist(s)
Paolo Monna	Men's 10 m air pistol	575 21x	6 Q	154.2	6
Federico Nilo Maldini	Men's 10 m air pistol	576 16x	5 Q	111.6	8

Women

Athlete	Event	Qualification		Final	
Athlete	Event	Points	Rank	Points	Rank
Sofia Ceccarello	Women's 10 m air rifle	624.2	11	Did not advance	
Carlotta Salafia	Women's 10 m air rifle	626.8	7 Q	185.9	5
Alessandra Fait	Women's 10 m air pistol	563.0 13x	14	Did not advance	
Margherita Brigida Veccaro	Women's 10 m air pistol	569.0 13x	6 Q	235.7	2nd place, silver medalist(s)

Mixed

Athlete	Event	Qualification		Final	
Athlete	Event	Points	Rank	Points	Rank
Carlotta Salafia; Danilo Sollazzo	Mixed rifle team	628.9	3 Q	500.9	2nd place, silver medalist(s)
Edoardo Bonazzi; Sofia Ceccarello	Mixed rifle team	624.0	7	Did not advance	
Alessandra Fait; Federico Nilo Maldini	Mixed team 10 m air pistol	568.0	6	Did not advance	
Margherita Brigida Veccero; Paolo Monna	Mixed team 10 m air pistol	569.0	3	Did not advance	

Shotgun
Men

Athlete	Event	Qualification		Final	
Athlete	Event	Points	Rank	Points	Rank
Erik Pittini	Men's skeet	121	2	9	7
Gabriele Rossetti	Men's skeet	121	1	22	4
Emanuele Buccolieri	Men's trap	124	1 Q	21	3rd place, bronze medalist(s)
Mauro De Filippis	Men's trap	117	10	Did not advance	

Women

Athlete	Event	Qualification		Final	
Athlete	Event	Points	Rank	Points	Rank
Diana Bacosi	Women's skeet	116	3 Q	8	7
Sara Bongini	Women's skeet	120	1 Q	32	1st place, gold medalist(s)
Erica Sessa	Women's trap	117	2 Q	27	2nd place, silver medalist(s)
Silvana Maria Stanco	Women's trap	115	5 Q	11	5

Mixed

Athlete	Event	Qualification		Final	
Athlete	Event	Points	Rank	Points	Rank
Silvana Maria Stanco; Mauro De Filippis	Trap mixed team	146	1 Q	23	3rd place, bronze medalist(s)
Erica Sessa; Emanuele Buccolieri	Trap mixed team	138	7	Did not advance	

== Skateboarding ==
Athlete	Event	Qualification		Final	
Athlete	Event	Score	Rank	Score	Rank
Andres Martin Gramaglia Fusconi	Men's Street	154.56	2 Q	64.57	7
Alessandro Mudu	Men's Street	133.57	6 Q	144.13	5
Gaia Urbinati	Women's Street	—N/a		151.32	2nd place, silver medalist(s)
Irene Panzavolta	Women's Street	—N/a		138.17	3rd place, bronze medalist(s)

== Swimming ==
Italy competed in swimming.

Men

Athlete	Event	Heat		Final	
Athlete	Event	Time	Rank	Time	Rank
Lorenzo Ballarati	50 m freestyle	22.02	1 q	22.00	2nd place, silver medalist(s)
Giovanni Guatti	50 m freestyle	22.16	1 q	21.96	1st place, gold medalist(s)
Lorenzo Ballarati	100 m freestyle	49.85	2 q	49.50	4
Gianluca Messina	100 m freestyle	50.32	4	Did not advance	
Jacopo Barbotti	200 m freestyle	1:49.93	1 q	1:47.53	1st place, gold medalist(s)
Marco De Tullio	200 m freestyle	1:50.54	3 q	DNS	
Alessandro Ragaini	400 m freestyle	3:51.44	2 q	3:49.02	2nd place, silver medalist(s)
Marco De Tullio	400 m freestyle	3:50.75	1 q	3:50.21	5
Davide Marchello	800 m freestyle	—N/a		8:01.10	6
Marco De Tullio	800 m freestyle	—N/a		7:46.61	1st place, gold medalist(s)
Matteo Diodato	1500 m freestyle	—N/a		15:06.27	1st place, gold medalist(s)
Ivan Giovannoni	1500 m freestyle	—N/a		15:08.01	3rd place, bronze medalist(s)
Gabriele Mancini	50 m breaststroke	27.70	2 q	27.26	2nd place, silver medalist(s)
Flavio Mangiamele	50 m breaststroke	27.65	2 q	27.59	4
Gabriele Mancini	100 m breaststroke	1:00.58	1 q	59.94	1st place, gold medalist(s)
Christian Mantegazza	100 m breaststroke	1:00.76	1 q	1:00.40	2nd place, silver medalist(s)
Andrea Prapugicu	200 m breaststroke	2:13.27	1q	2:12.53	5
Christian Mantegazza	200 m breaststroke	2:13.74	2 q	2:11.10	2nd place, silver medalist(s)
Daniele Del Signore	50 m backstroke	25.57	4 q	25.35	4
Francesco Lazzari	50 m backstroke	25.40	2 q	25.12	2nd place, silver medalist(s)
Daniele Del Signore	100 m backstroke	55.48	1 q	54.62	4
Francesco Lazzari	100 m backstroke	55.34	1 q	54.28	2nd place, silver medalist(s)
Daniele Del Signore	200 m backstroke	2:01.29	3 q	2:00.60	7
Matteo Venini	200 m backstroke	2:00.98	1 q	1:57.28	2nd place, silver medalist(s)
Lorenzo Gargani	50 m butterfly	23.52	2 q	23.35	2nd place, silver medalist(s)
Victor Sanin	50 m butterfly	23.84	2 q	23.65	7
Alberto Razzetti	100 m butterfly	52.34	1 q	52.11	1st place, gold medalist(s)
Edoardo Valsecchi	100 m butterfly	52.70	2 q	52.21	2nd place, silver medalist(s)
Alberto Razzetti	200 m butterfly	1:59.44	1 q	1:55.29	1st place, gold medalist(s)
Andrea Camozzi	200 m butterfly	1:57.12	1 q	1:57.29	2nd place, silver medalist(s)
Jacopo Barbotti	200 m individual medley	2:01.74	2 q	1:59.28	3rd place, bronze medalist(s)
Simone Spediacci	200 m individual medley	2:00.48	1 q	1:57.70	1st place, gold medalist(s)
Alberto Razzetti	400 m individual medley	4:24.88	1 q	4:11.99	1st place, gold medalist(s)
Emanuele Potenza	400 m individual medley	4:20.32	1 q	4:19.03	3rd place, bronze medalist(s)

Women

Athlete	Event	Heat		Final	
Athlete	Event	Time	Rank	Time	Rank
Agata Maria Ambler	50 m freestyle	25.23	1 q	25.12	3rd place, bronze medalist(s)
Elena Capretta	50 m freestyle	25.12	1 q	25.02	2nd place, silver medalist(s)
Matilde Biagiotti	100 m freestyle	55.90	1 q	55.78	4
Chiara Tarantino	100 m freestyle	56.15	2 q	54.67	2nd place, silver medalist(s)
Anna Chiara Mascolo	200 m freestyle	2:01.29	2 q	1:58.53	2nd place, silver medalist(s)
Bianca Nannucci	200 m freestyle	2:03.30	3 q	2:00.78	4
Antonietta Cesarano	400 m freestyle	4:17.70	2 q	4:13.17	3rd place, bronze medalist(s)
Bianca Nannucci	400 m freestyle	4:18.06	1 q	4:11.61	2nd place, silver medalist(s)
Antonietta Cesarano	800 m freestyle	—N/a		8:37.86	4
Noemi Cesarano	800 m freestyle	—N/a		8:29.65	1st place, gold medalist(s)
Noemi Cesarano	1500 m freestyle	—N/a		16:08.39	1st place, gold medalist(s)
Azzurra Sbaragli	1500 m freestyle	—N/a		16:30.57	3rd place, bronze medalist(s)
Lisa Angiolini	50 m breaststroke	30.45	1 q	30.64	1st place, gold medalist(s)
Irene Mati	50 m breaststroke	31.54	2 q	31.34	3rd place, bronze medalist(s)
Lisa Angiolini	100 m breaststroke	1:08.21	1 q	1:06.55	2nd place, silver medalist(s)
Benedetta Pilato	100 m breaststroke	1:06.64	1 q	1:05.82	1st place, gold medalist(s)
Lisa Angiolini	200 m breaststroke	2:29.47	1 q	2:24.27	1st place, gold medalist(s)
Francesca Zucca	200 m breaststroke	2:31.06	4q	2:28.46	3rd place, bronze medalist(s)
Martina Biasoli	50 m backstroke	28.29	1 q	28.24	2nd place, silver medalist(s)
Costanza Cocconcelli	50 m backstroke	27.85	1 q	28.03	1st place, gold medalist(s)
Martina Biasoli	100 m backstroke	1:01.81	2 q	1:01.12	3rd place, bronze medalist(s)
Federica Toma	100 m backstroke	1:02.31	1 q	1:00.74	2nd place, silver medalist(s)
Alessia Bianchi	200 m backstroke	2:19.02	3 q	2:16.39	7
Federica Toma	200 m backstroke	2:16.71	2 q	2:11.62	2nd place, silver medalist(s)
Elena Capretta	50 m butterfly	26.73	1 q	26.59	5
Viola Scotto Di Carlo	50 m butterfly	26.57	1 q	26.29	2nd place, silver medalist(s)
Paola Borrelli	100 m butterfly	59.57	1 q	59.13	3rd place, bronze medalist(s)
Sofia Sartori	100 m butterfly	59.54	1 q	59.35	5
Paola Borrelli	200 m butterfly	2:10.25	1 q	2:08.47	1st place, gold medalist(s)
Sofia Sartori	200 m butterfly	2:13.06	2 q	2:12.43	4
Chiara Della Corte	200 m individual medley	—N/a		2:11.65	2nd place, silver medalist(s)
Sara Franceschi	200 m individual medley	—N/a		2:11.22	1st place, gold medalist(s)
Giada Alzetta	400 m individual medley	—N/a		4:39.05	1st place, gold medalist(s)
Anna Pirovano	400 m individual medley	—N/a		4:47.62	2nd place, silver medalist(s)

Mixed

Athlete	Event	Heat		Final	
Athlete	Event	Time	Rank	Time	Rank
Costanza Cocconcelli; Francesco Lazzari; Gabriele Mancini; Chiara Tarantino	4x100 medley relay	3:50.87	1 q	3:45.66	1st place, gold medalist(s)

== Table tennis ==
Men

Athlete	Event	Round of 32	Round of 16	Quarterfinals	Semifinals	Final / BM	
Athlete	Event	Opposition Result	Opposition Result	Opposition Result	Opposition Result	Opposition Result	Rank
John Michael Oyebode	Men's singles	Koni (ALB); W 4-0	Stamatouros (GRE); W 4-1	Seyfried (FRA); L 3-4	Did not advance		
Matteo Mutti	Men's singles	Mahmudi (KOS); W 4-0	De Nodrest (FRA); L 3-4	Did not advance			
Matteo Mutti; Carlo Rossi; John Michael Oyebode	Men's team	—N/a	Cyprus (CYP); W 3-0	Slovenia (SLO); W 3-1	France (FRA); W 3-2	Egypt (EGY); W 3-0	1st place, gold medalist(s)

Women

Athlete	Event	Round of 32	Round of 16	Quarterfinals	Semifinals	Final / BM	
Athlete	Event	Opposition Result	Opposition Result	Opposition Result	Opposition Result	Opposition Result	Rank
Giorgia Piccolin	Women's singles	Opeka (SLO); W 4-1	Zhang Xu (ESP); W 4-0	Ruza Surjan (SRB); W 4-1	Goda (EGY); L 1-4	Lupulesku (SRB); L 2-4	4
Gaia Monfardini	Women's singles	Sager Ogli (SYR); W 4-0	Lutz (FRA); L 0-4	Did not advance			
Nicole Arlia; Gaia Monfardini; Giorgia Piccolin	Women's team	—N/a	Bye	Portugal (POR); W 3-1	Turkey (TUR); W 3-1	Egypt (EGY); L 0-3	2nd place, silver medalist(s)

Mixed

Athlete	Event	Round of 16	Quarterfinals	Semifinals	Final / BM	
Athlete	Event	Opposition Result	Opposition Result	Opposition Result	Opposition Result	Rank
John Michael Oyebode; Gaia Monfardini	Mixed doubles	H. Zaza / O. Zaza (SYR); W 3-0	Ouaiche / Morice (ALG); W 3-1	Yigenler / Harac (TUR); L 2-3	De Nodrest / Lutz (FRA); W 3-0	3rd place, bronze medalist(s)

== Taekwondo ==
Italy competed in taekwondo.

Men

Athlete	Event	Round of 16	Quarterfinals	Semifinals	Final / BM	
Athlete	Event	Opposition Result	Opposition Result	Opposition Result	Opposition Result	Rank
Gaetano Cirivello	Men's − 58 kg	Molj (SLO); W 2-0	Fraile Rodriguez (ESP); L 0-2	Did not advance		
Dennis Baretta	Men's − 68 kg	Simonovski (MKD); W 2-0	Alaphilippe (FRA); L 0-2	Did not advance		
Angelo Mangione	Men's − 80 kg	Nikolaou (CYP); W 2-1	Tankov (SRB); L 0-2	Did not advance		
Mattia Molin	Men's + 80 kg	Elasbi Mar (MAR); L 0-2	Did not advance			

Women

Athlete	Event	Round of 16	Quarterfinals	Semifinals	Final / BM	
Athlete	Event	Opposition Result	Opposition Result	Opposition Result	Opposition Result	Rank
Lucrezia Maloberti	Women's − 49 kg	Krim (FRA); L 0-2	Did not advance			
Anna Cuorvo	Women's − 57 kg	Reljikj (MKD); L 0-2	Did not advance			
Anna Gertrud Gruber	Women's − 67 kg	Zecirovic (SRB); L 0-2	Did not advance			
Ana Ciuchitu	Men's + 67 kg	Mediouni (TUN); L 0-2	Did not advance			

== Tennis ==
Italy competed in tennis.

Men

Athlete	Event	Round of 32	Round of 16	Quarterfinals	Semifinals	Final / BM	
Athlete	Event	Opposition Score	Opposition Score	Opposition Score	Opposition Score	Opposition Score	Rank
Filippo Romano	Men's Singles	Bye	Rocha (POR); L 0-2	Did not advance			
Carlo Alberto Caniato	Men's Singles	Bye	Limani (KOS); W 2-0	Abderrahman (TUN); W 2-0	Sanchez Quilez (ESP); L 0-2	Rocha (POR); W 2-0	3rd place, bronze medalist(s)
Filippo Romano; Carlo Alberto Caniato	Men's double	—N/a	Bye	De Gabriele / Delicata (MLT); L 1-2	Did not advance		

Women

Athlete	Event	Round of 32	Round of 16	Quarterfinals	Semifinals	Final / BM	
Athlete	Event	Opposition Score	Opposition Score	Opposition Score	Opposition Score	Opposition Score	Rank
Noemi Basiletti	Women's Singles	Bye	Nikcevic (MNE); W 2-0	Cortez Llorca (ESP); W 2-0	Kabbaj (MAR); W 2-1	Matoula (GRE); W 2-0	1st place, gold medalist(s)
Vittoria Paganetti	Women's Singles	Bye	Alletti (SMR); W 2-0	Matoula (GRE); L 0-2	Did not advance		
Noemi Basiletti; Vittoria Paganetti	Women's double	—N/a		Bye	Cortez Llorca / Garcia Cid (ESP); W 2-0	Korokozidi / Matoula (GRE); L 0-2	2nd place, silver medalist(s)

Mixed

Athlete	Event	Round of 16	Quarterfinals	Semifinals	Final / BM	
Athlete	Event	Opposition Score	Opposition Score	Opposition Score	Opposition Score	Rank
Filippo Romano; Vittoria Paganetti	Mixed double	Bye	Serban /Neos (CYP); W 2-0	Rocha /Matias (POR); W 2-0	Cortez Llorca /Sanchez Quilez (ESP); W 2-0	1st place, gold medalist(s)

== Triathlon ==
Italy competed in triathlon.

Individual

Athlete	Event	Time						Rank
Athlete	Event	Swim (1.5 km)	Trans 1	Bike (40 km)	Trans 2	Run (10 km)	Total	Rank
Riccardo Cultore	Men's	9:23	0:19	28:09	0:21	18:42	56:54	13
Euan De Nigro	Men's	9:39	0:18	27:53	0:22	15:43	53:55	2nd place, silver medalist(s)
Paola Sacchi	Women's	13:11	0:21	32:02	0:14	17:08	1:02:42	3rd place, bronze medalist(s)
Bianca Seregni	Women's	12:12	0:22	31:42	0:14	18:01	1:02:17	1st place, gold medalist(s)

Relay

Athlete	Event	Time						Rank
Athlete	Event	Swim (300 m)	Trans 1	Bike (7 km)	Trans 2	Run (2 km)	Total group	Rank
Riccardo Cultore	Mixed relay	3:39	0:14	3:34	0:16	1:51	19:00	—N/a
Euan De Nigro	Mixed relay	3:44	0:13	3:27	0:20	2:02	19:06	—N/a
Paola Sacchi	Mixed relay	4:00	0:17	3:54	0:17	1:56	20:31	—N/a
Bianca Seregni	Mixed relay	3:56	0:15	3:57	0:20	2:09	21:07	—N/a
Total	Mixed relay	—N/a					1:19:44	1st place, gold medalist(s)

== Volleyball ==
Italy competed in volleyball.

Summary

Team	Event	Group Stage						Semifinal	Final / BM	
Team	Event	Opposition Score	Opposition Score	Opposition Score	Opposition Score	Opposition Score	Rank	Opposition Score	Opposition Score	Rank
Italy Men's	Men's tournament	Portugal; W 3-1	Tunisia; W 3-1	Serbia; W 3-0	Algeria; W 3-0	France; W 3-0	1 Q	Greece; L 2-3	Turkey; W 3-2	3rd place, bronze medalist(s)
Italy women's	Women's tournament	Bosnia and Herzegovina; W 3-0	Egypt; W 3-0	Serbia; W 3-0	—N/a		1 Q	Greece; W 3-0	Turkey; L 0-3	2nd place, silver medalist(s)

== Water polo ==
Summary

Team	Event	Group Stage					Semifinal	Final / BM	
Team	Event	Opposition Score	Opposition Score	Opposition Score	Opposition Score	Rank	Opposition Score	Opposition Score	Rank
Italy Men's	Men's tournament	Bosnia and Herzegovina; W 38-4	Turkey; W 25-7	France; W 15-6	Spain; W 14-13	1 Q	Serbia; W 11-10	Montenegro; W 18-14	1st place, gold medalist(s)

== Weightlifting ==
Men

Athlete	Event	Snatch		Clean & Jerk	
Athlete	Event	Result	Rank	Result	Rank
Sergio Massidda	Men's 65 kg	130	3rd place, bronze medalist(s)	162	1st place, gold medalist(s)
Cristiano Giuseppe Ficco	Men's 85 kg	155	3rd place, bronze medalist(s)	190	3rd place, bronze medalist(s)
Lorenzo Tarquini	Men's 95 kg	162	5	193	5
Simone Karol Abati	Men's 110 kg	175	3rd place, bronze medalist(s)	190	5

Women

Athlete	Event	Snatch		Clean & Jerk	
Athlete	Event	Result	Rank	Result	Rank
Celine Ludovica Delia	Women's 53 kg	81	3rd place, bronze medalist(s)	101	4
Martina Chiacchio	Women's 61 kg	98	1st place, gold medalist(s)	120	1st place, gold medalist(s)
Giulia Miserendino	Women's 69 kg	102	1st place, gold medalist(s)	120	5
Genna Toko Kegne	Women's 77 kg	105	2nd place, silver medalist(s)	127	2nd place, silver medalist(s)

== Wrestling ==
Italy competed in wrestling.

Key:

- WO – walkover
- VT (ranking points: 5–0 or 0–5) – Victory by fall.
- VB (ranking points: 5–0 or 0–5) – Victory by injury (VF for forfeit, VA for withdrawal or disqualification)
- PP (ranking points: 3–1 or 1–3) – Decision by points – the loser with technical points.
- PO (ranking points: 3–0 or 0–3) – Decision by points – the loser without technical points.
- ST (ranking points: 4–0 or 0–4) – Great superiority – the loser without technical points and a margin of victory of at least 8 (Greco-Roman) or 10 (freestyle) points.
- SP (ranking points: 4–1 or 1–4) – Technical superiority – the loser with technical points and a margin of victory of at least 8 (Greco-Roman) or 10 (freestyle) points.

Greco-Roman

Athlete	Event	Group Stage			Round of 16	Quarterfinal	Semifinal	Repechage	Final / BM	
Athlete	Event	Opposition Result	Opposition Result	Rank	Opposition Result	Opposition Result	Opposition Result	Opposition Result	Opposition Result	Rank
Gabriele Pucher	Men's 60 kg	—N/a			Sina (ALB); W ST (9-0)	Fergat (ALG); L PO (0-7)	—N/a	Bye	Gharbi (MAR); L ST (0-8)	5
Jacopo Sandron	Men's 67 kg	—N/a			Bye	Zeneli (ALB); L SP (3-11)	Did not advance			
Luca Dariozzi	Men's 77 kg	—N/a			Bye	Kamenjasevic (CRO); L PP (1-3)	—N/a	Tarhouni (TUN); W SP (11-3)	Kolitsopoulos (GRE); W PP (5-1)	3rd place, bronze medalist(s)
Leon Rivalta	Men's 87 kg	—N/a			Bye	Bur (FRA) W PP (10-4)	Huklek (CRO); L PP (3-8)	Bye	Sid Azara (ALG); L PP (1-4)	5
Nikoloz Kakhelashvili	Men's 97 kg	Rouabah (ALG); L PP (3-3)	Elsayed (EGY); W PP (7-1)	1	—N/a		Kesidis (GRE); W PP (5-3)	—N/a	Komarov (SRB); L PP (1-3)	2nd place, silver medalist(s)

Freestyle
Men

Athlete	Event	Group Stage					Round of 16	Quarterfinal	Semifinal	Repechage	Final / BM	
Athlete	Event	Opposition Result	Opposition Result	Opposition Result	Opposition Result	Rank	Opposition Result	Opposition Result	Opposition Result	Opposition Result	Opposition Result	Rank
Angelo Pirrone	Men's 57 kg	Karavus (TUR); L PO (0-4)	Galbouraev (FRA); L PO (0-4)	Altabbaa (SYR); L PP (1-3)	Usinov (MKD); W VBF	4	Did not advance					
Daniele Gubbiotti	Men's 65 kg	—N/a						Laribi (ALG); L VT (2-7)	Did not advance			
Luca Finizio	Men's 74 kg	—N/a					Mottaghinia Mottaghinia (ESP); L ST (0-11)	Did not advance				
Gabriele Niccolini	Men's 86 kg	—N/a					Benferdjallah (ALG); W PP (17-8)	Alosta (SYR); W ST (10-0)	Kougioumtsidis (GRE); L ST (0-10	—N/a	Magomedov (MKD); L ST (0-10)	5
Benjamin Konrad Honis	Men's 97 kg	Salahel (EGY); W VT (6-2)	Gune (TUR); LVF (3-10)	Viskhavon (FRA); L VF	—N/a	3	Did not advance					
Abraham Conyedo	Men's 125 kg	Karepi (ALB); W PO (4-0)	Nurov (MKD); L PP (2-7)	Khosonov (GRE); L PP (1-3)	—N/a	2	—N/a		Buyukcingil (TUR); L PP (1-5)	—N/a	Khosonov (GRE); L PP (1-3)	5

Women

Athlete	Event	Group Stage			Round of 16	Quarterfinal	Semifinal	Repechage	Final / BM	
Athlete	Event	Opposition Result	Opposition Result	Rank	Opposition Result	Opposition Result	Opposition Result	Opposition Result	Opposition Result	Rank
Emanuela Liuzzi	Women's 50 kg	—N/a			Demihran (TUR); L PP (2-4)	—N/a		Ayachi (TUN); W PO (5-0)	Haemmerle (FRA); W VB	3rd place, bronze medalist(s)
Naomi Liuzzi	Women's 53 kg	—N/a				Debien (FRA); L VT (6-0)	Did not advance			
Fabiana Rinella	Women's 57 kg	—N/a				Sion (FRA); W PO (5-0)	Suleyman (TUR); L VT (0-11)	—N/a	Jeljeli (TUN); W VT (5-0	3rd place, bronze medalist(s)
Immacolata Danise	Women's 62 kg	Dagbasi (TUR); L PP (3-6)	Jakovljevic (SRB); W PP (7-5)	2	—N/a		Douarre (FRA); L ST (0-11)	—N/a	Hamdoun (EGY); L ST (0-5)	5
Laura Godino	Women's 68 kg	—N/a			Bye	Sghaier (TUN); W PP (7-4)	Vilk (CRO); W SP (13-3)	—N/a	Bas (TUR); L PP (2-4)	2nd place, silver medalist(s)
Enrica Rinaldi	Women's 76 kg	Kocak (TUR); L PP (2-3)	Bouregba (ALG); W PP (3-1)	2	—N/a		Hamza (EGY); L PP (1-4)	—N/a	Dacher (FRA); W PO (7-0)	3rd place, bronze medalist(s)
