= Swimming at the 2026 Mediterranean Games – Women's 100 metre breaststroke =

Women's 100 metre breaststroke at the 2026 Mediterranean Games
- Venue: Stadio del nuoto Torre d'Ayala
- Location: Taranto, Italy
- Dates: 22 August
- Competitors: 16 from 11 nations
- Winning time: 1:05.82

Medalists
gold medal	Benedetta Pilato	Italy
silver medal	Lisa Angiolini	Italy
bronze medal	Tina Celik	Slovenia

The Women's 100 metre breaststroke competition at the 2026 Mediterranean Games was held on 22 August 2026 at the Torre d'Ayala Swimming Stadium in Taranto, Italy.

== Records ==
Prior to this competition, the existing world and Mediterranean Games records were as follows:

World record	Lilly King (USA)	1:04.13	Budapest, Hungary	25 July 2017
Mediterranean Games record	Jessica Vall (ESP)	1:07.19	Tarragona, Spain	24 June 2018

During the competition, Benedetta Pilato set a new Mediterranean Games record of 1:06.64 in the final.

== Results ==
=== Heats ===
The heats were started at 11:01.

Rank	Heat	Lane	Name	Nationality	Time	Notes
1	2	4	Benedetta Pilato	Italy	1:06.64	q
2	1	4	Lisa Angiolini	Italy	1:08.21	q
3	1	5	Tina Celik	Slovenia	1:08.58	q
4	2	5	Martina Bukvic	Serbia	1:09.08	q
5	2	2	Ana Blažević	Croatia	1:09.26	q
6	1	2	Nikoletta Pavlopoulou	Greece	1:09.60	q
7	2	6	Lynn El Hajj	Lebanon	1:09.61	q
8	2	3	Andromachi Tasakou	Greece	1:09.75	q
9	1	3	Maria Erokhina	Cyprus	1:10.02	R1
10	2	7	Esther Cordente	Spain	1:10.51	
11	1	7	Aina Fernández González	Spain	1:10.51	
12	1	6	Ana Rodrigues	Portugal	1:10.51	
13	2	1	Pinar Dönmez	Turkey	1:11.22	
14	2	8	Habiba Belghith	Tunisia	1:11.52	
15	1	1	Meriç Uygun	Turkey	1:12.03	
16	1	8	Thea Obeid	Lebanon	1:12.88	

=== Final ===
The final was held at 18:54.

Rank	Lane	Name	Nationality	Time	Notes
1st place, gold medalist(s)	4	Benedetta Pilato	Italy	1:05.82	GR
2nd place, silver medalist(s)	5	Lisa Angiolini	Italy	1:06.55	
3rd place, bronze medalist(s)	3	Tina Celik	Slovenia	1:07.58	
4	2	Ana Blažević	Croatia	1:08.62	
5	7	Nikoletta Pavlopoulou	Greece	1:09.16	
6	6	Martina Bukvic	Serbia	1:09.39	
7	8	Andromachi Tasakou	Greece	1:09.54	
8	1	Lynn El Hajj	Lebanon	1:09.85	
