= Swimming at the 2026 Mediterranean Games – Men's 1500 metre freestyle =

Men's 1500 metre freestyle at the 2026 Mediterranean Games
- Location: Taranto, Italy
- Dates: 25 August
- Competitors: 8 from 7 nations
- Winning time: 15:06.27

Medalists
gold medal	Matteo Diodato	Italy
silver medal	Cristóbal Vargas Trujillo	Spain
bronze medal	Ivan Giovannoni	Italy

The Men's 1500 metre freestyle competition at the 2026 Mediterranean Games was held on 25 August 2026 at the Torre d'Ayala Swimming Stadium in Taranto.

== Records ==
Prior to this competition, the existing world and Mediterranean Games records were as follows:

World record	Johannes Liebmann (GER)	14:26.79	Paris, France	15 August 2026
Mediterranean Games record	Oussama Mellouli (TUN)	14:38.01	Pescara, Italy	1 July 2009

== Results ==
=== Final ===
The final was held at 19:10.

Rank	Lane	Name	Nationality	Time	Notes
1st place, gold medalist(s)	3	Matteo Diodato	Italy	15:06.27	
2nd place, silver medalist(s)	2	Cristóbal Vargas	Spain	15:07.37	
3rd place, bronze medalist(s)	6	Ivan Giovannoni	Italy	15:08.01	
4	5	Franko Grgić	Croatia	15:12.48	
5	1	Nikola Simić	Serbia	15:15.43	
6	4	Ahmed Jaouadi	Tunisia	15:30.99	
7	8	Rodrigo Borges	Portugal	15:34.28	
8	7	Emir Batur Albayrak	Turkey	15:54.74	
