= Swimming at the 2026 Mediterranean Games – Women's 50 metre breaststroke =

Women's 50 metre breaststroke at the 2026 Mediterranean Games
- Venue: Stadio del nuoto Torre d'Ayala
- Location: Taranto, Italy
- Dates: 24 August
- Competitors: 16 from 12 nations
- Winning time: 30.64

Medalists
gold medal	Lisa Angiolini	Italy
silver medal	Ana Rodrigues	Portugal
bronze medal	Irene Mati	Italy

The Women's 50 metre breaststroke competition at the 2026 Mediterranean Games was held on 24 August 2026 at the Torre d'Ayala Swimming Stadium in Taranto, Italy.

== Records ==
Prior to this competition, the existing world and Mediterranean Games records were as follows:

World record	Rūta Meilutytė (LTU)	29.16	Fukuoka, Japan	30 July 2023
Mediterranean Games record	Arianna Castiglioni (ITA)	31.07	Tarragona, Spain	25 June 2018

During the competition, Lisa Angiolini set a new Mediterranean Games record of 30.45 in the hetas.

== Results ==
=== Heats ===
The heats were started at 10:18.

Rank	Heat	Lane	Name	Nationality	Time	Notes
1	2	4	Lisa Angiolini	Italy	30.45	q, GR
2	1	5	Ana Rodrigues	Portugal	31.48	q
3	2	5	Irene Mati	Italy	31.54	q
4	2	3	Esther Cordente	Spain	31.78	q
5	2	2	Martina Bukvic	Serbia	32.02	q
6	2	6	Tina Celik	Slovenia	32.11	q
7	2	8	Thea Obeid	Lebanon	32.17	q
8	1	2	Lynn El Hajj	Lebanon	32.37	q
9	2	1	Pinar Dönmez	Turkey	32.62	R1
9	1	7	Maria Erokhina	Cyprus	32.62	
11	1	4	Meri Mataja	Croatia	32.63	
12	2	7	Imane El Barodi	Morocco	32.85	
13	1	6	Andromachi Tasakou	Greece	33.05	
14	1	3	İlkim Karaali	Turkey	33.31	
15	1	8	Habiba Belghith	Tunisia	33.47	
	1	1	Nikoletta Pavlopoulou	Greece	Did not start	

=== Final ===
The final was held at 18:12.

Rank	Lane	Name	Nationality	Time	Notes
1st place, gold medalist(s)	4	Lisa Angiolini	Italy	30.64	
2nd place, silver medalist(s)	5	Ana Rodrigues	Portugal	31.01	
3rd place, bronze medalist(s)	3	Irene Mati	Italy	31.34	
4	6	Esther Cordente	Spain	31.73	
5	7	Tina Celik	Slovenia	31.78	
6	2	Martina Bukvic	Serbia	31.96	
7	1	Thea Obeid	Lebanon	1:09.54	
8	8	Lynn El Hajj	Lebanon	32.61	
