= Artistic gymnastics at the 2026 Mediterranean Games – Men's floor =

Men's floor at the 2026 Mediterranean Games
- Venue: Grottaglie Sports Hall
- Date: 2 September 2026
- Competitors: 8 from 6 nations
- Winning total: 13.700

Medalists
gold medal	(Greece) Antonios Tantalidis
silver medal	(Italy) Ivan Brunello
bronze medal	(Italy) Niccolò Vannucchi

The Men's floor competition at the 2026 Mediterranean Games was held on 2 September 2026 at the Grottaglie Sports Hall.

== Qualification ==
Rank	Gymnast	D Score	E Score	Pen.	Bon.	Total	Qual.
1	Niccolò Vannucchi (ITA)	5.5	8.500	-0.1		13.900	Q
2	Antonios Tantalidis (GRE)	5.2	8.650			13.850	Q
3	Ivan Brunello (ITA)	5.1	8.550		0.1	13.750	Q
4	Swaïmy Bellil (FRA)	4.8	8.700			13.500	Q
5	Mert Efe Kılıçer (TUR)	4.6	8.850			13.450	Q
6	Nicolau Mir (ESP)	5.1	8.350			13.450	Q
7	Mehmet Ayberk Koşak (TUR)	5.0	8.400			13.400	Q
8	Anze Hribar (SLO)	5.6	8.100	-0.4	0.1	13.400	Q
9	Antonin Delaye (FRA)	5.2	8.150			13.350	R1
10	Neofytos Kyriakou (CYP)	4.8	8.450			13.250	R2
11	Alperen Ege Avcı (TUR)	5.1	8.250	-0.1		13.250	–
12	Lorenzo Aymes (FRA)	4.9	8.450	-0.2		13.150	–
13	Enae Fouchard (FRA)	5.2	7.950	-0.1		13.050	–
14	Marios Georgiou (CYP)	4.9	8.050			12.950	R3

== Final ==
Rank	Gymnast	D Score	E Score	Pen.	Bon.	Total
1st place, gold medalist(s)	Antonios Tantalidis (GRE)	5.2	8.500	-0.1	0.1	13.700
2nd place, silver medalist(s)	Ivan Brunello (ITA)	5.1	8.400		0.1	13.600
3rd place, bronze medalist(s)	Niccolò Vannucchi (ITA)	5.5	8.000		0.1	13.600
4	Mehmet Ayberk Koşak (TUR)	5.0	8.400		0.1	13.500
5	Nicolau Mir (ESP)	5.1	8.300	-0.1	0.1	13.400
6	Mert Efe Kılıçer (TUR)	4.6	8.600			13.200
7	Swaïmy Bellil (FRA)	4.8	8.400			13.200
8	Anze Hribar (SLO)	5.4	7.100	-0.1		12.400
