= Swimming at the 2026 Mediterranean Games – Men's 400 metre individual medley =

Men's 400 metre individual medley at the 2026 Mediterranean Games
- Location: Taranto, Italy
- Dates: 24 August
- Competitors: 13 from 9 nations
- Winning time: 4:11.99

Medalists
gold medal	Alberto Razzetti	Italy
silver medal	Daniil Giourtzidis	Greece
bronze medal	Emanuele Potenza	Italy

The men's 400 metre individual medley competition at the 2026 Mediterranean Games was held on 24 August at the Torre d'Ayala Swimming Stadium in Taranto.

== Records ==
Prior to this competition, the existing world and Mediterranean Games records were as follows:

World record	Léon Marchand (FRA)	4:02.50	Fukuoka, Japan	23 July 2023
Mediterranean Games record	Oussama Mellouli (TUN)	4:10.53	Pescara, Italy	29 June 2009

== Results ==
=== Heats ===
The heats were started at 10:28.

Rank	Heat	Lane	Swimmer	Nation	Time	Notes
1	1	5	Emanuele Potenza	Italy	4:20.32	Q
2	1	4	Diego Mira	Spain	4:21.07	Q
3	1	3	Alberto Hernández	Spain	4:22.28	Q
4	2	4	Alberto Razzetti	Italy	4:24.88	Q
5	2	5	Daniil Giourtzidis	Greece	4:25.06	Q
6	2	6	Strahinja Maslo	Serbia	4:27.13	Q
7	1	6	Eren Kuru	Turkey	4:27.71	Q
8	2	3	Apostolos Papastamos	Greece	4:28.36	Q
9	2	7	Jaš Berložnik	Slovenia	4:28.66	
10	1	2	Mohamed Yassine Ben Abbes	Tunisia	4:30.07	
11	1	7	Ramzi Chouchar	Algeria	4:35.58	
12	2	2	Emre Onuş	Turkey	4:38.56	
13	2	1	Karlo Perčinić	Croatia	4:38.68	

=== Final ===
The final was held at 18:31.

Rank	Lane	Name	Nationality	Time	Notes
1st place, gold medalist(s)	6	Alberto Razzetti	Italy	4:11.99	
2nd place, silver medalist(s)	2	Daniil Giourtzidis	Greece	4:18.28	
3rd place, bronze medalist(s)	4	Emanuele Potenza	Italy	4:19.03	
4	3	Alberto Hernández	Spain	4:19.23	
5	8	Apostolos Papastamos	Greece	4:19.53	
6	5	Diego Mira	Spain	4:19.87	
7	1	Eren Kuru	Turkey	4:26.57	
8	7	Strahinja Maslo	Serbia	4:27.71	
