= Swimming at the 2026 Mediterranean Games – Women's 200 metre individual medley =

Women's 200 metre individual medley at the 2026 Mediterranean Games
- Location: Taranto, Italy
- Dates: 25 August
- Competitors: 6 from 4 nations
- Winning time: 2:11.12

Medalists
gold medal	Sara Franceschi	Italy
silver medal	Chiara Della Corte	Italy
bronze medal	Nikoletta Pavlopoulou	Greece

The Women's 200 metre individual medley competition at the 2026 Mediterranean Games was held on 25 August 2026 at the Torre d'Ayala Swimming Stadium in Taranto. The final was contested in two heats, with the fastest heat and the slowest heat, and the overall ranking determined by the times recorded across both heats.

== Records ==
Prior to this competition, the existing world record was as follows:

World record	Summer McIntosh (CAN)	2:05.70	Victoria, Canada	9 June 2025
Mediterranean Games record	Camille Muffat (FRA)	2:10.36	Pescara, Italy	27 June 2009

== Results ==
=== Final ===
The final was held at 18:00.

Rank	Lane	Name	Nationality	Time	Notes
1st place, gold medalist(s)	5	Sara Franceschi	Italy	2:11.22	
2nd place, silver medalist(s)	4	Chiara Della Corte	Italy	2:11.65	
3rd place, bronze medalist(s)	3	Nikoletta Pavlopoulou	Greece	2:12.69	
4	6	Sudem Denizli	Turkey	8:37.86	
5	2	Meriç Uygun	Turkey	2:19.69	
6	7	Maria Erokhina	Cyprus	2:22.60	
