= Sailing at the Mediterranean Games =

Sailing competition

Sailing is one of the sports at the quadrennial Mediterranean Games competition. It has been a sport in the program of the Mediterranean Games since the event's second edition in 1955.

== Editions ==
Games	Year	Host city	Host country	Events	Best nation
I	1951	Alexandria	Egypt	Not included in program	
II	1955	Barcelona	Spain	3	Italy (ITA)
III	1959	Beirut	Lebanon	1	Greece (GRE)
IV	1963	Naples	Italy	3	
V	1967	Tunis	Tunisia	Not included in program	
VI	1971	İzmir	Turkey	3	Greece (GRE)
VII	1975	Algiers	Algeria	3	
VIII	1979	Split	Yugoslavia	3	
IX	1983	Casablanca	Morocco	2	
X	1987	Latakia	Syria	Not included in program	
XI	1991	Athens	Greece	4	
XII	1993	Perpignan	France	5	
XIII	1997	Bari	Italy	5	
XIV	2001	Tunis	Tunisia	6	Italy (ITA)
XV	2005	Almería	Spain	5	France (FRA)
XVI	2009	Pescara	Italy	4	
XVII	2013	Mersin	Turkey	4	Croatia (CRO)
XVIII	2018	Tarragona	Spain	4	Spain (ESP)
XIX	2022	Oran	Algeria	4	France (FRA)
XX	2026	Taranto	Italy	4	France (FRA)

=== All-time medal table ===
Updated after the most recent 2026 Mediterranean Games

Rank	Nation	Gold	Silver	Bronze	Total
1	Italy (ITA)	23	17	16	56
2	France (FRA)	21	17	13	51
3	Spain (ESP)	8	13	12	33
4	Greece (GRE)	6	6	10	22
5	Croatia (CRO)	3	5	3	11
6	Slovenia (SLO)	2	1	2	5
7	Yugoslavia (YUG)	1	1	1	3
8	Turkey (TUR)	0	1	3	4
9	Cyprus (CYP)	0	1	0	1
9	Lebanon (LBN)	0	1	0	1
11	Egypt (EGY)	0	0	1	1
11	Monaco (MON)	0	0	1	1
11	United Arab Republic (UAR)	0	0	1	1
Totals (13 entries)		64	63	63	190
