= Swimming at the 2026 Mediterranean Games – Mixed 4 × 100 metre medley relay =

Mixed 4 × 100 metre medley relay at the 2026 Mediterranean Games
- Location: Taranto, Italy
- Dates: 23 August
- Competitors: 48 from 8 nations
- Teams: 8
- Winning time: 3:45.66

Medalists
gold medal	Francesco Lazzari; Gabriele Mancini; Costanza Cocconcelli; Chiara Tarantino; Federica Toma; Elena Capretta; Lorenzo Ballarati	Italy
silver medal	Apostolos Christou; Nikoletta Pavlopoulou; Anna Ntountounaki; Stergios Bilas; Evangelos Makrygiannis; Andromachi Tasakou; Andreas Vazaios	Greece
bronze medal	Camila Rebelo; Gabriel Lopes; Vasco Morgado; Francisca Martins; Ricardo Santos; Ana Rodrigues; Inês Henriques	Portugal

The mixed 4 × 100 metre medley relay competition at the 2026 Mediterranean Games was held on 23 August at the Torre d'Ayala Swimming Stadium in Taranto.

== Records ==
Prior to this competition, the existing world and Mediterranean Games records were as follows:

World record	United States	3:36.70	Irvine, United States	12 August 2026
Mediterranean Games record	—			

== Results ==
=== Heats ===
The heats were started at 11:18.

Rank	Heat	Lane	Nation	Swimmers	Time	Notes
1	2	3	Italy	Federica Toma (1:01.45); Gabriele Mancini (1:00.78); Elena Capretta (59.42); Lorenzo Ballarati (49.22)	3:50.87	Q, GR
2	2	4	Spain	Diego Mira (55.28); Esther Cordente (1:09.77); Naiara Sobreviela (1:00.00); Josep Castro (48.37)	3:53.42	Q
3	2	5	Turkey	Berke Saka (57.22); Pınar Dönmez (1:09.86); Polat Uzer Turnalı (54.88); Selen Özbilen (56.94)	3:58.90	Q
4	2	6	Greece	Evangelos Makrygiannis (55.43); Andromachi Tasakou (1:11.01); Anna Ntountounaki (1:03.82); Andreas Vazaios (48.88)	3:59.14	Q
5	2	2	Slovenia	Primož Šenica Pavletič (58.99); Tina Čelik (1:09.56); Jaka Pušnik (55.62); Nika Fain (58.25)	4:02.42	Q
6	1	3	Portugal	Ricardo Santos (55.66); Ana Rodrigues (1:10.47); Inês Henriques (1:05.09); Gabriel Lopes (52.54)	4:03.76	Q
7	1	5	Croatia	Luka Čarapović (1:00.89); Ana Blažević (1:11.19); Amina Kajtaz Pinjo (1:08.68); Toni Dragoja (49.42)	4:10.18	Q
8	1	6	San Marino	Margherita Gregoroni (1:08.62); Giacomo Casadei (1:08.99); Alessandro Rebosio (56.26); Ilaria Ceccaroni (59.23)	4:13.10	Q
	1	4	Algeria		Did not start	

=== Final ===
The final was held at 19:34.

Rank	Lane	Nation	Swimmers	Time	Notes
1st place, gold medalist(s)	4	Italy	Francesco Lazzari (53.91); Gabriele Mancini (59.49); Costanza Cocconcelli (58.21); Chiara Tarantino (54.05)	3:45.66	GR
2nd place, silver medalist(s)	6	Greece	Apostolos Christou (52.79); Nikoletta Pavlopoulou (1:08.06); Anna Ntountounaki (58.35); Stergios Bilas (48.69)	3:47.89	
3rd place, bronze medalist(s)	7	Portugal	Camila Rebelo (1:01.06); Gabriel Lopes (1:01.33); Vasco Morgado (53.04); Francisca Martins (54.77)	3:50.20	
4	1	Croatia	Luka Čarapović (55.07); Ana Blažević (1:09.39); Amina Kajtaz Pinjo (58.76); Toni Dragoja (48.11)	3:51.33	
5	3	Turkey	Sudem Denizli (1:02.94); Berkay Ömer Öğretir (1:01.14); Arda Akkoyun (53.15); Beren Başaran (57.34)	3:54.57	
6	2	Slovenia	Primož Šenica Pavletič (56.27); Tina Čelik (1:08.31); Jaka Pušnik (55.15); Janja Šegel (54.86)	3:54.59	
7	8	San Marino	Margherita Gregoroni (1:07.36); Giacomo Casadei (1:03.24); Alessandro Rebosio (56.27); Ilaria Ceccaroni (57.40)	4:04.27	
	5	Spain	Diego Mira (55.23); Joaquín Pardo (1:00.19); Naiara Sobreviela (1:00.04); Ainhoa Campabadal	Disqualified	
