= Artistic gymnastics at the 2026 Mediterranean Games – Men's rings =

Men's rings at the 2026 Mediterranean Games
- Venue: Grottaglie Sports Hall
- Date: 2 September 2026
- Competitors: 8 from 6 nations
- Winning total: 13.700

Medalists
gold medal	(Turkey) Mehmet Ayberk Koşak
silver medal	(Italy) Niccolò Vannucchi
bronze medal	(Egypt) Omar Mohamed

The Men's rings competition at the 2026 Mediterranean Games was held on 2 September 2026 at the Grottaglie Sports Hall.

== Qualification ==
Rank	Gymnast	D Score	E Score	Pen.	Bon.	Total	Qual.
1	Mehmet Ayberk Koşak (TUR)	5.5	8.600		0.1	14.200	Q
2	Omar Mohamed (EGY)	5.2	8.600		0.1	13.900	Q
3	Niccolò Vannucchi (ITA)	5.1	8.600			13.700	Q
4	Sokratis Pilakouris (CYP)	4.8	8.800			13.600	Q
5	Christos Tsingelidis (GRE)	5.1	8.250			13.350	Q
6	Luka Bojanc (SLO)	5.1	8.150		0.1	13.350	Q
7	Marios Georgiou (CYP)	4.7	8.600			13.300	~~Q~~ WD
8	Ivan Brunello (ITA)	4.2	8.750			12.950	Q
9	Altan Doğan (TUR)	5.1	8.750		0.1	12.950	R1 Sub
10	Omar El Shobki (EGY)	4.3	8.500		0.1	12.900	R2
11	Daniel Carrión Caro (ESP)	4.0	8.750		0.1	12.850	R3

== Final ==
Rank	Gymnast	D Score	E Score	Pen.	Bon.	Total
1st place, gold medalist(s)	Mehmet Ayberk Koşak (TUR)	5.5	8.650		0.1	14.250
2nd place, silver medalist(s)	Niccolò Vannucchi (ITA)	5.1	8.750			13.850
3rd place, bronze medalist(s)	Omar Mohamed (EGY)	5.2	8.650			13.850
4	Christos Tsingelidis (GRE)	5.1	8.600		0.1	13.800
5	Sokratis Pilakouris (CYP)	4.8	8.700			13.500
6	Luka Bojanc (SLO)	5.1	8.400			13.500
7	Altan Doğan (TUR)	4.1	8.750			12.850
8	Ivan Brunello (ITA)	4.2	8.450			12.650
