= Padel at the 2026 Mediterranean Games =

- Venue: Parco del Mediterraneo alla Salinella, Taranto
- Date: 22 - 28 August

The Padel event at the 2026 Mediterranean Games was held from 22 to 28 August at the Parco del Mediterraneo alla Salinella, Taranto. The padel made its debut at the Mediterranean Games at this 2026 event.

== Medal summary ==
Event	Gold	Silver	Bronze
Men's doubles	Spain; José Antonio Diestro; David Gala	Italy; Flavio Abbate; Alvaro Montiel Caruso	Italy; Marco Cassetta; Flavio Iacovino
Women's doubles	Spain; Patricia Llaguno; Lucía Sainz	Spain; Nuria Rodríguez; Jimena Velasco	Italy; Giorgia Marchetti; Carolina Orsi
Mixed doubles	Portugal; Pedro Araujo; Sofia Araujo	Italy; Marco Cassetta; Giulia Del Pozzo	France; Louise Bahurel; Dylan Guichard

== Medal table ==
* Host nation (Italy)

Rank	Nation	Gold	Silver	Bronze	Total
1	Spain	2	1	0	3
2	Portugal	1	0	0	1
3	Italy*	0	2	2	4
4	France	0	0	1	1
Totals (4 entries)		3	3	3	9
