= Canoeing at the 2026 Mediterranean Games – Men's C-1 1000 metres =

Men's canoe sprint C-1 1000 metres at the 2026 Mediterranean Games
- Venue: Parco Cimino - Mar Piccolo
- Date: 23 August
- Competitors: 7 from 7 nations
- Winning time: 4:19.560

Medalists
gold medal	Samuele Veglianti	Italy
silver medal	Tiago Maciel	Portugal
bronze medal	Lucas Laroche	France

The men's canoe sprint C-1 1000 metres at the 2026 Mediterranean Games in Taranto took place on 23 August at the Parco Cimino – Mar Piccolo.

== Schedule ==
All times are Italy time (UTC+02:00)

Date	Time	Round
Sunday, 23 August 2026	11:40	Final

== Results ==
=== Final ===
Rank	Lane	Canoer	Country	Time	Notes
1st place, gold medalist(s)	6	Samuele Veglianti	Italy	4:19.560	
2nd place, silver medalist(s)	2	Tiago Maciel	Portugal	4:25.430	
3rd place, bronze medalist(s)	5	Lucas Laroche	France	4:28.790	
4	8	Pedro Torrado	Spain	4:31.610	
5	4	Mohamed Gouda	Egypt	4:41.530	
6	7	Mohamed Ali Merzougui	Algeria	5:01.300	
7	3	Mohamed Ali Hmida	Tunisia	5:09.740	
