= Artistic gymnastics at the 2026 Mediterranean Games – Men's horizontal bar =

Men's horizontal bar at the 2026 Mediterranean Games
- Venue: Grottaglie Sports Hall
- Date: 2 September 2026
- Competitors: 8 from 6 nations
- Winning total: 14.200

Medalists
gold medal	(Cyprus) Marios Georgiou
silver medal	(France) Swaïmy Bellil
bronze medal	(Cyprus) Neofytos Kyriakou

The Men's horizontal bar competition at the 2026 Mediterranean Games was held on 2 September 2026 at the Grottaglie Sports Hall.

== Qualification ==
Rank	Gymnast	D Score	E Score	Pen.	Bon.	Total	Qual.
1	Marios Georgiou (CYP)	5.4	8.750		0.1	14.250	Q
2	Mert Efe Kılıçer (TUR)	5.8	8.400			14.200	Q
3	Lorenzo Aymes (FRA)	5.2	8.600		0.1	13.800	Q
4	Apostolos Kanellos (GRE)	5.6	8.200			13.800	Q
5	Swaïmy Bellil (FRA)	5.0	8.500		0.1	13.600	Q
6	Matteo Levantesi (ITA)	4.4	8.900		0.1	13.400	Q
7	Alphonce Burbail (FRA)	4.8	8.600			13.400	–
8	Neofytos Kyriakou (CYP)	5.2	8.150		0.1	13.350	Q
9	Omar Mohamed (EGY)	4.9	8.350			13.250	Q
10	Ilias Georgiou (CYP)	4.1	8.850		0.1	13.050	–
11	Ignacio Yockers (ESP)	4.2	8.700		0.1	13.000	R1
12	Mostafa Ahmed (EGY)	4.4	8.600			13.000	R1
13	Kevin Buckley (SLO)	4.9	8.100			13.000	R3

== Final ==
Rank	Gymnast	D Score	E Score	Pen.	Bon.	Total
1st place, gold medalist(s)	Marios Georgiou (CYP)	5.5	8.600		0.1	14.200
2nd place, silver medalist(s)	Swaïmy Bellil (FRA)	5.0	8.650		0.1	13.750
3rd place, bronze medalist(s)	Neofytos Kyriakou (CYP)	4.7	8.400			12.100
4	Matteo Levantesi (ITA)	4.8	7.550		0.1	12.450
5	Mert Efe Kılıçer (TUR)	4.7	7.650			12.350
6	Apostolos Kanellos (GRE)	5.0	7.100			12.100
7	Lorenzo Aymes (FRA)	5.6	6.400			12.000
8	Omar Mohamed (EGY)	4.7	7.2			11.900
