= Swimming at the 2026 Mediterranean Games – Women's 1500 metre freestyle =

Women's 1500 metre freestyle at the 2026 Mediterranean Games
- Location: Taranto, Italy
- Dates: 22 August
- Competitors: 6 from 5 nations
- Winning time: 16:08.39

Medalists
gold medal	Noemi Cesarano	Italy
silver medal	Artemis Vasilaki	Greece
bronze medal	Azzurra Sbaragli	Italy

The Women's 1500 metre freestyle competition at the 2026 Mediterranean Games was held on 22 August 2026 at the Torre d'Ayala Swimming Stadium in Taranto.

== Records ==
Prior to this competition, the existing world record was as follows:

World record	Katie Ledecky (USA)	15:20.48	Indianapolis, United States	16 May 2018

== Results ==
=== Final ===
The final was held at 19:26.

Rank	Lane	Name	Nationality	Time	Notes
1st place, gold medalist(s)	4	Noemi Cesarano	Italy	16:08.39	GR
2nd place, silver medalist(s)	5	Artemis Vasilaki	Greece	16:22.15	
3rd place, bronze medalist(s)	3	Azzurra Sbaragli	Italy	16:30.57	
4	6	Selinnur Sade	Turkey	16:38.99	
5	2	Jamila Boulakbech	Tunisia	16:46.56	NR
6	7	Špela Perše	Slovenia	17:47.73	
