= Swimming at the 2026 Mediterranean Games – Women's 400 metre individual medley =

Women's 400 metre individual medley at the 2026 Mediterranean Games
- Location: Taranto, Italy
- Dates: 24 August
- Competitors: 5 from 3 nations
- Winning time: 4:39.05

Medalists
gold medal	Giada Alzetta	Italy
silver medal	Anna Pirovano	Italy
bronze medal	Paula González	Spain

The Women's 400 metre individual medley competition at the 2026 Mediterranean Games was held on 24 August 2026 at the Torre d'Ayala Swimming Stadium in Taranto. The final was contested in two heats, with the fastest heat and the slowest heat, and the overall ranking determined by the times recorded across both heats.

== Records ==
Prior to this competition, the existing world record was as follows:

World record	Summer McIntosh (CAN)	4:23.65	Victoria, Canada	11 June 2025
Mediterranean Games record	Catalina Corró (ESP)	4:39.42	Tarragona, Spain	23 June 2018

During the competition, Giada Alzetta set a new Mediterranean Games record of 4:39.05 seconds in the final.

== Results ==
=== Final ===
The final was held at 18:24.

Rank	Lane	Name	Nationality	Time	Notes
1st place, gold medalist(s)	5	Giada Alzetta	Italy	4:39.05	GR
2nd place, silver medalist(s)	4	Anna Pirovano	Italy	4:47.62	
3rd place, bronze medalist(s)	3	Paula González	Spain	4:48.68	
4	2	Ecem Dönmez	Turkey	4:51.42	
	6	Belis Şakar	Turkey	Disqualified	
