= Swimming at the 2026 Mediterranean Games – Men's 100 metre breaststroke =

Men's 100 metre breaststroke at the 2026 Mediterranean Games
- Location: Taranto, Italy
- Dates: 22 August
- Competitors: 14 from 10 nations
- Winning time: 59.94

Medalists
gold medal	Gabriele Mancini	Italy
silver medal	Christian Mantegazza	Italy
bronze medal	Joaquín Pardo	Spain

The Men's 50 metre breaststroke competition at the 2026 Mediterranean Games was held on 22 August 2026 at the Torre d'Ayala Swimming Stadium in Taranto.

== Records ==
Prior to this competition, the existing world and Mediterranean Games records were as follows:

World record	Adam Peaty (GBR)	56.88	Gwangju, South Korea	21 July 2019
Mediterranean Games record	Berkay Ömer Öğretir (TUR)	1:00.03	Oran, Algeria	30 June 2022

During the competition, Gabriele Mancini break the Mediterranean Games record in the final, winning the gold medal in 59.94. He improved the previous record of 1:00.03, set by Berkay Ömer Öğretir at the 2022 Mediterranean Games, by 0.09 seconds.

Record	Athlete	Time	Location	Date	Improvement
Mediterranean Games record	Gabriele Mancini (ITA)	59.94	Taranto, Italy	22 August 2026	-0.09 s

== Results ==
=== Heats ===
The heats were held at 11:09.

Rank	Heat	Lane	Swimmer	Nation	Time	Notes
1	2	4	Gabriele Mancini	Italy	1:00.58	Q
2	1	4	Christian Mantegazza	Italy	1:00.76	Q
3	1	3	Joaquín Pardo	Spain	1:01.07	Q
4	2	6	Filip Mujan	Croatia	1:01.74	Q
5	2	5	Berkay Ömer Öğretir	Turkey	1:01.82	Q
6	1	7	Gabriel Lopes	Portugal	1:02.00	Q
7	2	3	Savvas Thomoglou	Greece	1:02.42	Q
8	2	2	Giacomo Casadei	San Marino	1:02.51	Q
9	1	6	Uroš Živanović	Serbia	1:02.55	
10	1	5	Hüseyin Emre Sakçı	Turkey	1:02.92	
11	2	7	Vito Radoš	Croatia	1:03.00	
12	1	2	Marios Zafeiropoulos	Greece	1:03.23	
13	2	1	Jaš Berložnik	Slovenia	1:03.70	
14	1	1	Youssef Abboud	Lebanon	1:03.95	

=== Final ===
The final was held at 18:58.

Rank	Lane	Name	Nationality	Time	Notes
1st place, gold medalist(s)	4	Gabriele Mancini	Italy	59.94	GR
2nd place, silver medalist(s)	5	Christian Mantegazza	Italy	1:00.40	
3rd place, bronze medalist(s)	3	Joaquín Pardo	Spain	1:00.58	
4	2	Berkay Ömer Öğretir	Turkey	1:01.60	
5	6	Filip Mujan	Croatia	1:02.01	
6	1	Savvas Thomoglou	Greece	1:02.11	
7	7	Gabriel Lopes	Portugal	1:02.39	
8	8	Giacomo Casadei	San Marino	1:02.43	
