= Roller Marathon at the 2026 Mediterranean Games – Women's Marathon =

Women's marathon at the 2026 Mediterranean Games
- Venue: Taranto Urban Circuit
- Location: Taranto, Italy
- Dates: 28 August
- Competitors: 13 from 7 nations
- Winning time: 1:23:15.628

Medalists
gold medal	Melissa Gatti	Italy
silver medal	Francisca Gomes Henriques	Portugal
bronze medal	Sofia Saronni	Italy

The Women's marathon competition in roller speed skating at the 2026 Mediterranean Games was held on 28 August 2026 at the Taranto Urban Circuit in Taranto, Italy, over a distance of 42.195 km.

The race was won by Italy's Melissa Gatti, ahead of Portugal's Francisca Gomes Henriques and Italy's Sofia Saronni.

== Results ==
=== Final ===
The final was held at 16:00 and was contested over a distance of 42.195 km.

Rank	Bib	Name	6.6 km	9.7 km	12.8 km	15.9 km	19.0 km	22.1 km	25.2 km	28.3 km	31.4 km	34.5 km	37.6 km	Final
1st place, gold medalist(s)	8	Melissa Gatti; Italy	11:47.793	17:53.336	23:40.943	29:42.232	35:16.775	41:06.043	47:33.799	54:19.953	1:00:35.702	1:07:37.823	1:15:06.341	1:23:15.628
2nd place, silver medalist(s)	10	Francisca Gomes Henriques; Portugal	11:47.656	17:53.106	23:40.643	29:42.057	35:15.517	41:05.495	47:33.224	54:19.435	1:00:36.069	1:07:38.226	1:15:06.656	1:23:15.674
3rd place, bronze medalist(s)	9	Sofia Saronni; Italy	11:48.021	17:52.658	23:41.227	29:41.432	35:18.399	41:06.156	47:33.278	54:21.114	1:00:36.856	1:07:38.418	1:15:06.909	1:23:15.783
4	11	Jessica Carolina Santos Rodrigues; Portugal	11:47.465	17:53.262	23:40.860	29:41.934	35:16.905	41:05.370	47:33.614	54:19.204	1:00:35.837	1:07:38.089	1:15:06.564	1:23:16.448
5	5	Maiwenn Julou; France	11:48.258	17:52.952	23:40.567	29:41.820	35:15.125	40:58.918	47:32.147	54:20.824	1:00:36.653	1:07:37.904	1:15:07.133	1:23:16.977
6	7	Julia Bedon; Italy	11:47.854	17:53.489	23:41.074	29:42.252	35:18.591	41:05.733	47:33.973	54:19.740	1:00:35.450	1:07:37.514	1:15:06.156	1:23:20.119
7	3	Fareeda Wael Abdelha; Egypt	11:48.581	17:53.844	23:41.501	29:42.798	35:18.825	41:06.296	47:34.311	54:20.586	1:00:36.194	1:07:38.992	1:15:07.069	1:23:40.433
8	4	Marie Dupuy; France	11:48.116	17:52.730	23:41.354	29:41.609	35:18.502	41:05.601	47:33.290	54:20.302	1:00:36.553	1:07:38.711	1:15:07.188	1:24:49.417
9	2	Maram Attia Abdel Latif; Egypt	11:48.407	17:53.612	23:41.813	29:42.524	35:18.890	41:29.824	48:48.431	56:00.732	1:03:24.513	1:10:41.041	1:17:55.246	1:27:24.343
10	12	Nina Cernic; Slovenia	11:48.752	17:53.968	23:41.953	29:42.920	35:27.298	42:07.823	49:09.021	56:00.609	1:03:24.309	1:10:40.819	1:17:55.103	1:27:24.372
—	6	Aubane Plouhinec; France												DNS
—	1	Marta Tomsic; Croatia												DNF
—	13	Hilal Yaman; Turkey												DNF
