= Salih Yildiz =

Dutch footballer (born 1978)

Personal information
- Date of birth: 28 November 1978 (age 47)
- Place of birth: Amsterdam, Netherlands
- Position: Defender

Youth career
- Ajax
- Vitesse

Senior career*
| Years | Team | Apps | (Gls) |
| 1999-2001 | Denizlispor | 5 | (0) |
| | Manisaspor | 25 | (2) |
| 2003 | Petkimspor | 4 | (1) |
| 2004-2005 | Göztepe | 27 | (2) |
| 2005-2006 | Akhisarspor | 16 | (1) |
| | Erzurumspor | 1 | (0) |
| 2007-2008 | Kırşehirspor | 18 | (0) |
- * Club domestic league appearances and goals

Salih Yildiz (born 23 November 1978) is a Dutch former footballer who is last known to have played as a defender for Kırşehirspor.

== Career ==
In 1999, Yildiz signed for Denizlispor in the Turkish top flight after playing for the youth academy of Ajax, the Netherlands' most successful club. However, he claimed that "The people at the club looked at me and said 'there you have another fake Turk there'. Only then did I notice that there was a huge mentality difference between me and the Turks. The Turkish I spoke was very outdated. That sounded very rude to the Turks. They thought I was very arrogant. Moreover, football was completely different from what I was used to in the Netherlands. You will then find out that you are actually between two cultures. You are a foreigner everywhere."

In 2003, he signed for Petkimspor in the Turkish fourth division.
