= Sailing at the 2026 Mediterranean Games =

- Venue: Centro Nautico Torpediniere, Taranto
- Dates: 27 August – 2 September

Sailing competitions at the 2026 Mediterranean Games was held from 27 August to 2 September at the Centro Nautico Torpediniere in Taranto.

== Medal summary ==
=== Men's event ===
| Event | Gold | Silver | Bronze |
|---|---|---|---|
| Laser | Lorenzo Mayer; France | Marios Stathas; Greece | Cesare Barabino; Italy |
| iQFOiL | Leonardo Tomasini; Italy | Federico Allan Pilloni; Italy | Gaspard Carfantan; France |

=== Women's event ===
| Event | Gold | Silver | Bronze |
|---|---|---|---|
| Laser Radial | Marie Barrué; France | Alenka Valenčič; Slovenia | Hermionie Ghicas; Greece |
| iQFOiL | Danai Pontifix; Greece | Medea Falcioni; Italy | Carola Colasanto; Italy |

== Medal table ==
* Host nation (Italy)

| Rank | Nation | Gold | Silver | Bronze | Total |
|---|---|---|---|---|---|
| 1 | France | 2 | 0 | 1 | 3 |
| 2 | Italy* | 1 | 2 | 2 | 5 |
| 3 | Greece | 1 | 1 | 1 | 3 |
| 4 | Slovenia | 0 | 1 | 0 | 1 |
| Totals (4 entries) | | 4 | 4 | 4 | 12 |
