= Mehmet Ayberk Koşak =

Turkish artistic gymnast (born 2001)

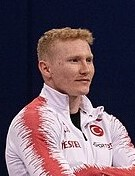
- Mehmet Ayberk Koşak at the 2022 European Men's Artistic Gymnastics Championships

Personal information
- Born: 4 January 2001 (age 25) Konak, İzmir, Turkey

Gymnastics career
- Discipline: Men's artistic gymnastics
- Country represented: Turkey
- Club: Göztepe Sports Club
Medal record
Men's artistic gymnastics
Representing Turkey
European Championships
Silver medal – second place	2023 Antalya	Team
Bronze medal – third place	2022 Munich	Team
Mediterranean Games
Gold medal – first place	2026 Taranto	Team
Gold medal – first place	2026 Taranto	Rings

Mehmet Ayberk Koşak (born 2001) is a Turkish male artistic gymnast and part of the national team.

== Early life ==
Mehmet Ayberk Koşak, born in 2001, is a native of Konak, İzmir, Turkey. He is a member of Göztepe Sports Club in İzmir.

== Career ==
At the 2022 European Men's Artistic Gymnastics Championships in Munich, Germany on 18-21 August, Koşak shared the bronze medal in the team event with Ferhat Arıcan, Ahmet Önder, Adem Asil and Kerem Şener. He won the bronze medal with his teammates Ferhat Arıcan, Adem Asil, İbrahim Çolak and Kerem Şener at the 2023 DTB Pokal Stuttgart, Germany. He took the silver medal in the team event with Adem Asil, Ahmet Önder, Ferhat Arıcan and Kerem Şener at the 2023 European Artistic Gymnastics Championships in Antalya, Turkey.
