= Ana Rodrigues (swimmer) =

Portuguese swimmer (born 1994)

Personal information
- Full name: Ana de Pinho Rodrigues
- Nationality: Portugal
- Born: 21 April 1994 (age 32) Sao Joao da Madeira, Portugal
- Height: 1.73 m (5 ft 8 in)
- Weight: 58 kg (128 lb)

Sport
- Sport: Swimming
- Strokes: Breaststroke, Freestyle
- Club: Associacao Estamos Juntos
Medal record
Women's swimming
Representing Portugal
Mediterranean Games
Silver medal – second place	2022 Oran	50 m breaststroke
Silver medal – second place	2026 Taranto	50 m breaststroke
Bronze medal – third place	2026 Taranto	4×100 m mixed medley
Summer Youth Olympics
Bronze medal – third place	2010 Singapore	50 m breaststroke

Ana Rodrigues (born 21 April 1994 in Sao Joao da Madeira) is a Portuguese swimmer. She represented Portugal at the 2012 Summer Olympics.
