= Michele Fina =

Italian politician (born 1978)

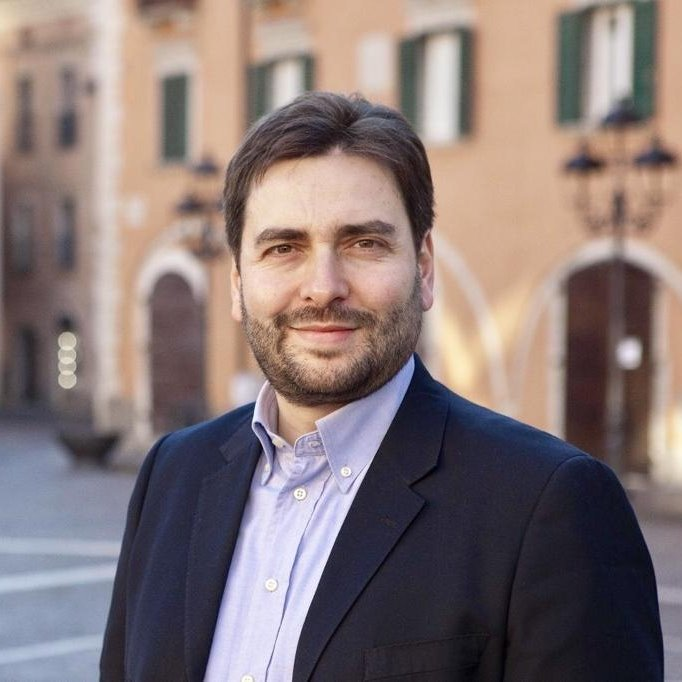
- Fina in 2022

Member of the Senate
- Incumbent
- Assumed office 13 October 2022
- Constituency: Abruzzo – 01

Personal details
- Born: 30 September 1978 (age 47)
- Party: Democratic Party (since 2007)

Michele Fina (born 30 September 1978) is an Italian politician serving as a member of the Senate since 2022. He has served as treasurer of the Democratic Party since 2023.
