= Nikoletta Pavlopoulou =

Greek swimmer (born 2001)

Personal information
- Nickname: Nicole
- Nationality: Greek
- Born: 1 January 2001 (age 25) Athens, Greece
- Education: University of Southern California Sapienza University of Rome

Sport
- Sport: swimming
- Events: breaststroke, individual medley
- University team: USC Trojans
- Club: AOPF

Achievements and titles
- Personal bests: 200m individual medley: 2:16.17 (2019, NR); 200m breaststroke: 2:28.68 (2018, JNR)
Medal record
Women's swimming
Representing Greece
Mediterranean Games
Silver medal – second place	2026 Taranto	4×100 m mixed medley
Bronze medal – third place	2026 Taranto	200 m medley

Nikoletta Pavlopoulou (born January 1, 2001) is a Greek swimmer, who competes for AOPF and is coached by Dimitris and George Damasiotis.

She has competed in European, World and Youth Olympic Games, where she placed 9th in the 200m individual medley, as well as European Women's Championships (16th 200m individual medley). She has broken 64 national records and she currently owns 12 records in 50m pool and 11 in 25m pool.

She graduated in 2023 from University of Southern California with a degree in Human Biology. She was also part of the NCAA Division I women's swimming team, competing at the Pac-12 and NCAA championships with the Trojans.

She is currently studying medicine at La Sapienza University of Rome.
