= List of Mediterranean Games records in swimming =

The fastest times in the swimming events at the Mediterranean Games are listed by International Mediterranean Games Committee (CIJM) as a list of Mediterranean Games records in swimming.

The events are held in a long course (50 m) pool. The list has been updated after the last Games, held in Taranto, Italy in 2026.

All records were set in finals unless noted otherwise.

== Men ==
Event	Time	Name	Nationality	Date	Meet	Location	Ref
50 m freestyle	21.17	Frédérick Bousquet	France	28 June 2009	2009 Games	Pescara, Italy	
100 m freestyle	47.83	Alain Bernard	France	29 June 2009	2009 Games	Pescara, Italy	
200 m freestyle	1:46.44	Oussama Mellouli	Tunisia	30 June 2009	2009 Games	Pescara, Italy	
400 m freestyle	3:42.71	Oussama Mellouli	Tunisia	27 June 2009	2009 Games	Pescara, Italy	
800 m freestyle	7:46.61	Luca De Tullio	Italy	23 August 2026	2026 Games	Taranto, Italy	
1500 m freestyle	14:38.01	Oussama Mellouli	Tunisia	1 July 2009	2009 Games	Pescara, Italy	
50m backstroke	24.73	Aschwin Wildeboer	Spain	27 Jun 2009	2009 Games	Pescara, Italy	
100m backstroke	52.34	Apostolos Christou	Greece	25 August 2026	2026 Games	Taranto, Italy	
200m backstroke	1:54.96	Aschwin Wildeboer	Spain	28 Jun 2009	2009 Games	Pescara, Italy	
50m breaststroke	26.97	Fabio Scozzoli	Italy	2 July 2022	2022 Games	Oran, Algeria	
100m breaststroke	59.94	Gabriele Mancini	Italy	22 August 2026	2026 Games	Taranto, Italy	
200m breaststroke	2:09.69	Melquiades Alvarez	Spain	29 Jun 2009	2009 Games	Pescara, Italy	
50m butterfly	23.18	Abdelrahman Sameh	Egypt	22 August 2026	2026 Games	Taranto, Italy	
100m butterfly	51.66	Matteo Rivolta	Italy	5 July 2022	2022 Games	Oran, Algeria	
200m butterfly	1:55.29	Alberto Razzetti	Italy	25 August 2026	2026 Games	Taranto, Italy	
200m individual medley	1:57.70	Simone Spediacci	Italy	25 August 2026	2026 Games	Taranto, Italy	
400m individual medley	4:10.53	Oussama Mellouli	Tunisia	29 June 2009	2009 Games	Pescara, Italy	
4×100m freestyle relay	3:12.03	Frédérick Bousquet (48.30); William Meynard (48.35); Amaury Leveaux (47.76); Alain Bernard (47.62)	France	28 June 2009	2009 Games	Pescara, Italy	
4×200m freestyle relay	7:09.44	Emiliano Brembilla (1:47.90); Marco Belotti (1:47.05); Gianluca Maglia (1:46.41); Filippo Magnini (1:48.08)	Italy	29 June 2009	2009 Games	Pescara, Italy	
4×100m medley relay	3:34.22	Aschwin Wildeboer (52.38); Melquíades Álvarez (1:00.58); Álex Villaécija (51.51); José Alonso (49.75)	Spain	1 July 2009	2009 Games	Pescara, Italy	

Legend: WR – World record; ER – European record;
Records not set in finals: h – heat; r – relay 1st leg; rh – relay heat 1st leg; so – swim-off

== Women ==
Event	Time		Name	Nationality	Date	Meet	Location	Ref
50 m freestyle	24.83		Farida Osman	Egypt	25 June 2018	2018 Games	Tarragona, Spain	
100 m freestyle	54.26	r	Janja Šegel	Slovenia	5 July 2022	2022 Games	Oran, Algeria	
200 m freestyle	1:56.68		Janja Šegel	Slovenia	2 July 2022	2022 Games	Oran, Algeria	
400 m freestyle	4:00.41		Federica Pellegrini	Italy	27 June 2009	2009 Games	Pescara, Italy	
800 m freestyle	8:20.78		Alessia Filippi	Italy	30 June 2009	2009 Games	Pescara, Italy	
1500 m freestyle	16:08.39		Noemi Cesarano	Italy	22 August 2026	2026 Games	Taranto, Italy	
50m backstroke	28.33		Silvia Scalia	Italy	23 June 2018	2018 Games	Tarragona, Spain	
100m backstroke	1:00.37		Camila Rebelo	Portugal	25 August 2026	2026 Games	Taranto, Italy	
200m backstroke	2:08.03		Alessia Filippi	Italy	28 June 2009	2009 Games	Pescara, Italy	
50m breaststroke	30.43	†, not ratified	Benedetta Pilato	Italy	22 August 2026	2026 Games	Taranto, Italy	
50m breaststroke	30.45	h	Lisa Angiolini	Italy	24 August 2026	2026 Games	Taranto, Italy	
100m breaststroke	1:05.82		Benedetta Pilato	Italy	22 August 2026	2026 Games	Taranto, Italy	
200m breaststroke	2:24.27		Lisa Angiolini	Spain	23 August 2026	2026 Games	Taranto, Italy	
50m butterfly	25.48		Farida Osman	Egypt	24 June 2018	2018 Games	Tarragona, Spain	
100m butterfly	57.55		Lana Pudar	Bosnia and Herzegovina	4 July 2022	2022 Games	Oran, Algeria	
200m butterfly	2:06.89		Caterina Giacchetti	Italy	1 Jul 2009	2009 Games	Pescara, Italy	
200m individual medley	2:10.36		Camille Muffat	France	27 Jun 2009	2009 Games	Pescara, Italy	
400m individual medley	4:39.05		Giada Alzetta	Italy	24 August 2026	2026 Games	Taranto, Italy	
4×100m freestyle relay	3:38.52		Janja Šegel (54.26); Neža Klančar (54.07); Katja Fain (54.82); Tjaša Pintar (55.37)	Slovenia	5 July 2022	2022 Games	Oran, Algeria	
4×200m freestyle relay	7:56.69		Flavia Zoccari (1:59.46); Erica Buratto (1:59.36); Alice Carpanese (1:59.41); Alessia Filippi (1:58.46)	Italy	30 June 2009	2009 Games	Pescara, Italy	
4×100m medley relay	3:58.27		Margherita Panziera (1:00.54); Arianna Castiglioni (1:06.14); Elena Di Liddo (57.05); Erika Ferraioli (54.54)	Italy	25 June 2018	2018 Games	Tarragona, Spain	

Legend: WR – World record; AF – African record; ER – European record;
Records not set in finals: h – heat; r – relay 1st leg; rh – relay heat 1st leg; so – swim-off

== Mixed relay ==
Event	Time	Name	Nationality	Date	Meet	Location	Ref
4×100 m medley relay	3:45.66	Francesco Lazzari (53.91); Gabriele Mancini (59.49); Costanza Cocconcelli (58.21); Chiara Tarantino (54.05)	Italy	23 August 2026	2026 Games	Taranto, Italy	

Legend: WR – World record; AF – African record; ER – European record;
Records not set in finals: h – heat
