= Turkey at the 2026 Mediterranean Games =

- IOC code: TUR
- NOC: Turkish Olympic Committee

in Taranto 21 August – 3 September
- Competitors: 335 in 29 sports
- Flag bearers: Nesrin Baş, Emre Sakçı
- Medals: Gold 41 Silver 28 Bronze 42 Total 111

Mediterranean Games appearances (overview)
- 1951; 1955; 1959; 1963; 1967; 1971; 1975; 1979; 1983; 1987; 1991; 1993; 1997; 2001; 2005; 2009; 2013; 2018; 2022; 2026

Turkey will participate in the 2026 Mediterranean Games in Taranto, Italy from 21 August to 3 September 2026. 335 athletes from Turkey, including 137 female and 198 male, were registered to compete in 29 sports at the Games.

== Medals by sport ==
Sport	Gold	Silver	Bronze	Total
Wrestling	8	3	4	15
Taekwondo	5	0	1	6
Shooting	4	3	3	10
Badminton	4	0	0	4
Athletics	3	3	9	15
Judo	3	0	3	6
Artistic gymnastics	3	0	2	5
Weightlifting	2	3	5	10
Swimming	2	2	3	7
Boxing	1	2	3	6
Fencing	1	2	1	4
Finswimming	1	1	2	4
Archery	1	1	1	3
Rhythmic gymnastics	1	0	0	1
Table tennis	1	0	0	1
Volleyball	1	0	0	1
Karate	0	3	3	6
Rowing	0	3	0	3
Boules	0	1	1	2
Equestrian	0	1	0	1
Tennis	0	0	1	1
Totals (21 entries)	41	28	42	111

== Medalists ==
Medal	Name	Sport	Event	Date
Gold	Elif Sude Akgül	Taekwondo	Women's -49 kg	22 August
Gold	Enes Kaplan	Taekwondo	Men's -58 kg	22 August
Gold	Hatice Kübra İlgün	Taekwondo	Women's -57 kg	22 August
Gold	Enver Yıldırım	Fencing	Men's Individual sabre	22 August
Gold	Muhammet Karavuş	Wrestling	Men's freestyle 57 kg	23 August
Gold	Yasemen Bektaş; Emre Sönmez	Badminton	Mixed Doubles	23 August
Gold	Işıl Zafer	Taekwondo	Women's -67 kg	23 August
Gold	Sude Yaren Uzunçavdar	Taekwondo	Women's +67 kg	23 August
Gold	Doruk Yoğurtçuoğlu	Swimming	Men's 200 m breaststroke	23 August
Gold	Yunus Emre Başar	Wrestling	Men's Greco-Roman 77 kg	23 August
Gold	Emre Sakçı	Swimming	Men's 50 m breaststroke	24 August
Gold	Ahmet Duman	Wrestling	Men's freestyle 65 kg	24 August
Gold	Hakan Büyükçıngıl	Wrestling	Men's freestyle 125 kg	24 August
Gold	Zehra Demirhan	Wrestling	Women's freestyle 50 kg	25 August
Gold	Zeynep Yetgil	Wrestling	Women's freestyle 53 kg	25 August
Gold	Elvira Kamaloğlu	Wrestling	Women's freestyle 57 kg	25 August
Gold	Nesrin Baş	Wrestling	Women's freestyle 68 kg	25 August
Gold	Hatice Gokce Emir	Rhythmic gymnastics	Individual all-around	26 August
Gold	Safiye Sarıtürk Temizdemir	Shooting	Women's Trap	26 August
Gold	Neslihan Arın	Badminton	Women's singles	26 August
Gold	Kaan Efe Kaya	Finswimming	Men's 400 m bi-fins	26 August
Gold	İsmail Keleş	Shooting	Men's 10 m air pistol	27 August
Gold	Mehmethan Çınar	Boxing	Men's 60 kg	27 August
Gold	Yavuz İlnam; Safiye Sarıtürk Temizdemir	Shooting	Trap team	27 August
Gold	Elif Berra Gökkır; Gizem Özkan; Dünya Yenihayat	Archery	Women's team	28 August
Gold	Tuğçe Beder	Judo	Women's -60 kg	28 August
Gold	Buğra Aktaş; Emre Sönmez	Badminton	Men's Doubles	28 August
Gold	Bengisu Erçetin; Nazlıcan İnci	Badminton	Women's Doubles	28 August
Gold	Tuana Gülenay	Judo	Women's -78 kg	29 August
Gold	İbrahim Tataroğlu	Judo	Men's +100 kg	29 August
Gold	Ece Haraç; Abdullah Talha Yiğenler	Table tennis	Mixed team	29 August
Gold	Simay Kurt, Tuğba İvegin, Merve Atlıer, Defne Başyolcu, İdil Naz Başcan, Arelya Karasoy Koçaş, Dilay Özdemir, Liza Safronova, Berka Buse Özden, Begüm Kaçmaz, Beren Yeşilırmak, Aylin Uysalcan	Volleyball	Women's team	30 August
Gold	Kubilay Ençü, Simay Özçiftçi, İsmail Nezir, Sıla Koloğlu	Athletics	4x400 m relay mixed team	30 August
Gold	Şimal Yılmaz, İsmail Keleş	Shooting	10 m air pistol Mixed team	31 August
Gold	Cansel Özkan	Weightlifting	Women's – 53 kg Snatch	31 August
Gold	Ferhat Arıcan, Alperen Ege Avcı, Altan Doğan, Mert Efe Kılıçer, Mehmet Ayberk Koşak, İbrahim Çolak	Artistic gymnastics	Men's artistic team all-around	31 August
Gold	Yusuf Fehmi Genç	Weightlifting	Men's – 75 kg Clean & Jerk	1 September
Gold	Mehmet Ayberk Koşak	Artistic gymnastics	Men's rings	2 September
Gold	Altan Doğan	Artistic gymnastics	Men's parallel bars	2 September
Gold	Berke Akçam, Ihsan Selçuk, Kubilay Ençü, Ismail Nezir	Athletics	Men's 4x400 m relay	2 September
Gold	Ali Kaya	Athletics	Men's Half marathon	3 September
Silver	Furkan Yaman	Fencing	Men's Individual sabre	22 August
Silver	Nisanur Erbil	Fencing	Women's Individual sabre	22 August
Silver	Çiğdem Özyaman	Shooting	Women's Skeet	23 August
Silver	Muhammet Seyhun Kaya	Shooting	Men's Skeet	23 August
Silver	Ahmet Mete Boylu	Swimming	Men's 200 m freestyle	23 August
Silver	İsmail Küçüksolak	Wrestling	Men's freestyle 86 kg	24 August
Silver	Mine Türker	Boules	Lyonnaise – Women's progressive shooting	25 August
Silver	Berke Saka	Swimming	Men's 200 m individual medley	25 August
Silver	Ebru Dağbaşı	Wrestling	Women's freestyle 62 kg	25 August
Silver	Kadriye Aksoy Koçak	Wrestling	Women's freestyle 76 kg	25 August
Silver	Emre Gurdenli	Finswimming	Men's 100 m bi-fins	26 August
Silver	Sema Çalışkan	Boxing	Women's 65 kg	27 August
Silver	Berat Acar	Boxing	Men's +90 kg	27 August
Silver	Dünya Yenihayat; Mete Gazoz	Archery	Mixed team	28 August
Silver	Şevval İlayda Tarhan, Buğra Selimzade	Shooting	10 m air pistol Mixed team	31 August
Silver	Ferdi Hardal	Weightlifting	Men's – 65 kg Snatch	31 August
Silver	Aysel Özkan	Weightlifting	Women's – 61 kg Snatch	31 August
Silver	Ertan Özkan, Kayhan Özer, Batuhan Altıntaş, Oğuz Uyar	Athletics	Men's 4x100 m relay	31 August
Silver	Enver Erman	Rowing	Men's single sculls	1 September
Silver	Ahmet Ali Kabadayı	Rowing	Men's lightweight single sculls	1 September
Silver	Yusuf Fehmi Genç	Weightlifting	Men's – 75 kg Snatch	1 September
Silver	Burak Özdemir	Karate	Men's 60 kg	1 September
Silver	Ömer Faruk Yürür	Karate	Men's 75 kg	1 September
Silver	Fatma Naz Yenen	Karate	Women's 61 kg	1 September
Silver	Hasan Şentürk	Equestrian	Individual jumping	1 September
Silver	Elis Özbay, Derin Kumuk	Rowing	Women's double sculls	2 September
Silver	İsmail Nezir	Athletics	Men's 400 m hurdles	2 September
Silver	Ersu Şaşma	Athletics	Men's Pole vault	2 September
Bronze	Sudem Denizli	Swimming	Women's 200 m Backstroke	22 August
Bronze	Hüseyin Berat Demircioğlu	Taekwondo	Men's +80 kg	23 August
Bronze	Murat Fırat	Wrestling	Men's Greco-Roman 67 kg	23 August
Bronze	Doğan Kaya	Wrestling	Men's Greco-Roman 87 kg	23 August
Bronze	Aleyna Ertürk	Fencing	Women's Individual épée	23 August
Bronze	Nusrat Allahverdi	Swimming	Men's 50 m breaststroke	24 August
Bronze	Yasin Yeşil	Wrestling	Men's freestyle 74 kg	24 August
Bronze	Resul Güne	Wrestling	Men's freestyle 97 kg	24 August
Bronze	Abdullah Kaplan	Boules	Raffa – Men's individual	25 August
Bronze	Polat Uzer Turnalı	Swimming	Men's 200 m butterfly	25 August
Bronze	Ece Asude Ediz	Boxing	Women's 57 kg	26 August
Bronze	Dilara Sak	Boxing	Women's 70 kg	26 August
Bronze	Sude Nur Aslan	Boxing	Women's 75 kg	26 August
Bronze	Buğra Selimzade	Shooting	Men's 10 m air pistol	27 August
Bronze	Derin Atman	Finswimming	Men's 50 m apnea	27 August
Bronze	Kaan Efe Kaya	Finswimming	Men's 200 m bi-fins	27 August
Bronze	Mete Gazoz, Berkim Tümer, Berkay Akkoyun	Archery	Men's team	28 August
Bronze	Salih Yıldız	Judo	Men's -60 kg	28 August
Bronze	Vedat Albayrak	Judo	Men's -81 kg	28 August
Bronze	Şevval İlayda Tarhan	Shooting	Women's 10 m air pistol	29 August
Bronze	Damla Köse, Mert Nalbant	Shooting	Mixed rifle team	30 August
Bronze	Özlem Yıldız, Ayşenur Budak, Sinem Oruç, Tuana Gülenay, Hilal Öztürk; Hilmi Mucık, Bilal Çiloğlu, Vedat Albayrak, Emir Selim Arı, İbrahim Tataroğlu	Judo	Mixed team	30 August
Bronze	Şilan Ayyıldız	Athletics	Women's 5000 m	30 August
Bronze	Çağla Büyükakçay, Berfu Cengiz	Tennis	Women's doubles	30 August
Bronze	Cansel Özkan	Weightlifting	Women's – 53 kg Clean & Jerk	31 August
Bronze	Ferdi Hardal	Weightlifting	Men's – 65 kg Clean & Jerk	31 August
Bronze	Büşra Akay, Sıla Koloğlu, Simay Özçiftçi, Elif Polat	Athletics	Women's 4x100 m relay	31 August
Bronze	Nuray Güngör	Weightlifting	Women's – 69 kg Clean & Jerk	31 August
Bronze	Eda Eltemur	Karate	Women's 68 kg	1 September
Bronze	Tuğbanur Koz	Weightlifting	Women's – 77 kg Snatch	2 September
Bronze	Tuğbanur Koz	Weightlifting	Women's – 77 kg Clean & Jerk	2 September
Bronze	Uğur Aktaş	Karate	Men's +84 kg	2 September
Bronze	Fatma Çekiç	Karate	Women's +68 kg	2 September
Bronze	Ferhat Arıcan	Artistic gymnastics	Men's pommel horse	2 September
Bronze	Alperen Ege Avcı	Artistic gymnastics	Men's vault	2 September
Bronze	Sıla Koloğlu	Athletics	Women's 200 m	2 September
Bronze	Berke Akçam	Athletics	Men's 400 m hurdles	2 September
Bronze	Şilan Ayyıldız	Athletics	Women's 1500 m	2 September
Bronze	Can Özüpek	Athletics	Men's Triple jump	2 September
Bronze	Özlem Becerek	Athletics	Women's Discus throw	2 September
Bronze	Simay Özçiftçi, Şilan Ayyıldız, Elif Polat, Sıla Koloğlu	Athletics	Women's 4x400 m relay	2 September
Bronze	Ramazan Baştuğ	Athletics	Men's Half marathon	3 September

== 3x3 basketball ==
=== Men ===
- Murat Kuntker
- Yiğit Sarı
- Zeki Es
- Baran Yurduşen

Athletes	Event	Preliminary				Quarterfinals	Semifinal	Final / BM	Rank
Athletes	Event	Match 1	Match 2	Match 3	Rank	Quarterfinals	Semifinal	Final / BM	Rank
Turkey	Men	Portugal; W 16-15	Kosovo; W 21-11	Serbia; W 0	1	Croatia; W 18-16	Spain; L 15-21	Algeria; L 19-21	4

=== Women ===
- Ceren Akpınar
- Ceylin Altunpa
- Selen Baş
- Selin Gül

Athletes	Event	Preliminary				Quarterfinals	Semifinal	Final / BM	Rank
Athletes	Event	Match 1	Match 2	Match 3	Rank	Quarterfinals	Semifinal	Final / BM	Rank
Turkey	Women	Tunisia; W 11-8	Algeria; W 20-13	Cyprus; L 7-12	2	France; L 13-21	Did not advance		5

== Archery ==
Men

Athlete	Event	Ranking round		Round of 64	Round of 32	Round of 16	Quarterfinals	Semifinals	Final / BM	
Athlete	Event	Score	Seed	Opposition Score	Opposition Score	Opposition Score	Opposition Score	Opposition Score	Opposition Score	Rank
Berkay Akkoyun	Individual	636	12	Bye	Charisis (GRE); W 6-2	Viale (FRA); L 2-6	Did not advance			10
Berkim Tümer	Individual	644	8	Bye	Karageorgiou (GRE); W 6-0	Antoku (ESP); L 2-6	Did not advance			10
Mete Gazoz	Individual	656	2	Bye	Themelis (GRE); W 6-0	Vrbec (SLO); W 6-2	Gregori (ITA); L 0-6	Did not advance		8
Berkay Akkoyun; Berkim Tümer; Mete Gazoz	Team	1936	3	—N/a		Bye	Egypt (EGY); W 6-0	Spain (ESP); L 3-5	Italy (ITA); W 6-0	3rd place, bronze medalist(s)

Women

Athlete	Event	Ranking round		Round of 32	Round of 16	Quarterfinals	Semifinals	Final / BM	
Athlete	Event	Score	Seed	Opposition Score	Opposition Score	Opposition Score	Opposition Score	Opposition Score	Rank
Dünya Yenihayat	Individual	656	3	Bye	Randriantsara (FRA); W 6-0	Gonzalez (ESP); L 5-6	Did not advance		5
Elif Gökkır	Individual	649	5	Hajjar (LBN); W 6-0	Pruccoli (SMR); W 6-0	Nasoula (GRE); W 7-3	Barbelin (FRA); L 2-6	Gonzalez (ESP); L 2-6	4
Gizem Özkan	Individual	621	12	Pruccoli (SMR); L 4-6	Did not advance				19
Dünya Yenihayat; Elif Gökkır; Gizem Özkan	Team	1926	3	—N/a	Bye	Cyprus (CYP); W 6-0	Italy (ITA); W 5-4	France (FRA); W 5-3	1st place, gold medalist(s)

Mixed

Athlete	Event	Ranking round		Round of 16	Quarterfinals	Semifinals	Final / BM	
Athlete	Event	Score	Seed	Opposition Score	Opposition Score	Opposition Score	Opposition Score	Rank
Dünya Yenihayat; Mete Gazoz	Mixed team	1312	3	Bye	Greece (GRE); W 5-3	Italy (ITA); W 6-2	France (FRA); L 0-6	2nd place, silver medalist(s)

== Athletics ==
=== Men ===
Track & road events

Athlete	Event	Semifinal		Final	
Athlete	Event	Result	Rank	Result	Rank
Kayhan Özer	100 m	10.49	4 Q	10.56	6
Ertan Özkan	100 m	10.62	7 q	10.52	5
Oğuz Uyar	200 m	20.80	6 Q	20.82	5
Deniz Kaan Kartal	200 m	21.16	9 q	21.13	7
Kubilay Ençü	400 m	45.91	9	Did not advance	
İsmail Nezir	400 m	46.70	11	Did not advance	
Ömer Faruk Bozdağ	800 m	1:47.10	9	Did not advance	
Salih Teksöz	1500 m	—N/a		3:43.81	6
Mehmet Çelik	1500 m	—N/a		3:43.53	5
Abdurrahman Gediklioğlu	5000 m	—N/a		14:44.13	7
Ali Kaya	Half marathon	—N/a		1:02:06	1st place, gold medalist(s)
Ramazan Baştuğ	Half marathon	—N/a		1:04:08	3rd place, bronze medalist(s)
Koray Uygun	110 m hurdles	14.00	3 Q	13.52	4
Mikdat Sevler	110 m hurdles	DNS		Did not advance	
İsmail Nezir	400 m hurdles	49.11	2 Q	49.01	2nd place, silver medalist(s)
Berke Akçam	400 m hurdles	49.33	3 Q	49.55	3rd place, bronze medalist(s)
Deniz Kaan Kartal; Kubilay Ençü; İsmail Nezir; Batuhan Altıntaş; İhsan Selçuk; Berke Akçam	4 × 100 m relay	—N/a		39.09	2nd place, silver medalist(s)

Field events

Athlete	Event	Final	
Athlete	Event	Result	Rank
Alperen Acet	High jump	2.15	4
Ersu Şaşma	Pole Vault	5.70	2nd place, silver medalist(s)
Can Özüpek	Triple Jump	16.14	3rd place, bronze medalist(s)
Ömer Şahin	Discus Throw	58.46	8
Özkan Baltacı	Hammer Throw	71.39	9
Halil Yilmazer	Hammer Throw	69.97	10
Muhammet Hanifi Zengin	Javelin Throw	68.02	9

=== Women ===
Track & road events

Athlete	Event	Semifinal		Final	
Athlete	Event	Result	Rank	Result	Rank
Simay Özçiftçi	100 m	11.91	10	Did not advance	
Büsra Akay	100 m	12.37	13	Did not advance	
Claire Azzopardi	100 m	12.40	14	Did not advance	
Sıla Koloğlu	200 m	23.27	3 Q	23.12	3rd place, bronze medalist(s)
Elif Polat	200 m	23.36	5 Q	23.32	5
Şilan Ayyıldız	1500 m	—N/a		4:09.79	3rd place, bronze medalist(s)
Yonca Kutluk Ala	5000 m	—N/a		15:23.08	3rd place, bronze medalist(s)
Derya Kunur	10000 m	—N/a		35:30.22	5
Yonca Kutluk Ala	10000 m	—N/a		35:43.71	7
Tuğba Güvenç Yenigün	3000 m steeplechase	—N/a		9:31.42	4
Derya Kunur	3000 m steeplechase	—N/a		9:40.52	5
Nursena Çeto	Half marathon	—N/a		1:16:21	9
Simay Özçiftçi; Sıla Koloğlu; Elif Polat; Büşra Akay	4 × 100 m relay	—N/a		44.05	3rd place, bronze medalist(s)
Simay Özçiftçi; Sıla Koloğlu; Elif Polat; Şilan Ayyıldız	4 × 400 m relay	—N/a		3:40.99	3rd place, bronze medalist(s)

Field events

Athlete	Event	Final	
Athlete	Event	Result	Rank
Yasemin Zehra Börekçi	Long Jump	6.20	8
Tuğba Danışmaz	Long Jump	5.96	10
Tuğba Danışmaz	Triple Jump	13.47	5
Özlem Becerek	Discus Throw	60.18	3rd place, bronze medalist(s)
Esra Türkmen	Javelin Throw	60.92	4
Eda Tuğsuz	Javelin Throw	59.75	6

=== Mixed ===
Track & road events

Athlete	Event	Final	
Athlete	Event	Result	Rank
Kayhan Özer; Ertan Özkan; Simay Özçiftçi; Sıla Koloğlu	Mixed 4 × 100 m relay	42.17	4
Kubilay Ençü; İsmail Nezir; Sıla Koloğlu; Elif Polat	Mixed 4 × 400 m relay	3:14.85	1st place, gold medalist(s)

== Badminton ==
Athlete	Event	Round of 32	Round of 16	Quarterfinal	Semifinal	Final	Rank
Nurullah Saraç	Men's singles	Bye	Toti (ITA); L 0–2 (19–21, 9–21)	Did not advance			9
Yusuf Yaşar	Men's singles	Jelenc (SLO); W 2–0 (21–11, 21–14)	Abdelhalim (EGY); W 2–0 (21–17, 21–19)	Vicen (ESP); L 0–2 (22–24, 14–21)	Did not advance		5
Emre Sönmez; Buğra Aktaş	Men's doubles	—N/a	Bye	Matteo Massetti; David Salutt (ITA); W 2-0 (21–12, 21–19)	Miha Ivancic; Tadej Jelenc (SLO); W 2-0 (21–17, 21–17)	Koceila Julien Mammeri; Youcef Sabri Medel (ALG); W 2-0 (21–19, 21–19)	1st place, gold medalist(s)

Athlete	Event	Round of 32	Round of 16	Quarterfinal	Semifinal	Final	Rank
Neslihan Arın	Women's singles	Bye	Mafalda Avelino (POR); W 2-0 (21–10, 21–14)	Anja Blazina (SLO); W 2-0 (21–14, 21–13)	Leonice Huet (FRA); W 2-0 (21–8, 21–18)	Yasmine Hamza (ITA); W 2-0 (21–17, 21–15)	1st place, gold medalist(s)
Bengisu Erçetin; Nazlıcan İnci	Women's doubles	—N/a	Bye	Yasmine Hamza; Gianna Stiglich Guzman (ITA); W 2-0 (21–13, 21–10)	Theodora Lamprianidou; Eleni Moutevelidou (GRE); W 2-0 (21–4, 21–5)	Agathe Cuevas; Elsa Jacob (FRA); W 2-0 (21–17, 21–17)	1st place, gold medalist(s)

Athlete	Event	Round of 32	Round of 16	Quarterfinal	Semifinal	Final	Rank
Yasemen Bektaş; Emre Sönmez	Mixed double	Bye	Ioanna Pissi; Ioannis Tambourlas (CYP); W 2-0 (21–8, 21–11)	Martina Fasai Corsini; David Salutt (ITA); W 2-1 (20–22, 21–15, 21–18)	Mihajlo Tomic; Andela Vitman (SRB); W 2-0 (21–12, 21–13)	Natan Begga; Elsa Jacob (FRA); W 2-1 (21–16, 15–21, 21–17)	1st place, gold medalist(s)

== Baseball5 ==
Athlete	Event	Match #1	Match #2	Match #3	Group Rank	Quarterfinal	Semifinal	Final / BM	Rank
Turkey	Mixed team	Greece; W 2–0	Syria; W 2–0	France; L 1–2	Q 2	Italy; W 2–0	Spain; W 2–1	France; W 2–1	1st place, gold medalist(s)

== Equestrian ==
Athlete	Horse	Event	Round 1		Round 2			Final					
Athlete	Horse	Event	Round 1		Round 2			Round A		Round B		Total	
Athlete	Horse	Event	Penalties	Rank	CP	Total	Sıra	CP	Rank	CP	Rank	CP	Rank
Alin Yazıcı	Cornascriebe Emerald	Individual											
Emre Buladoğlu	Maikel	Individual											
Hasan Şentürk	Avan Toi	Individual											
Necmi Eren	PSS Levilensky	Individual											
Alin Yazıcı; Emre Buladoğlu; Hasan Şentürk; Necmi Eren		Team											

== Fencing ==
Turkey competed in fencing.

Men

Athlete	Event	Match #1	Match #2	Match #3	Match #4	Match #5	Round of 16	Quarterfinal	Semifinal	Final / BM	Rank
Enver Yıldırım	Sabre	Bounabi (ALG); W 5-1	Choureiry (FRA); L 2-5	Kontoeidis (GRE); W 5-1	Hesham (EGY); L 4-5	Cavaliere (ITA); W 5-2	Hospital (FRA); W 15-10	Moataz (EGY); W 15-13	Ferjani (TUN); W 15-14	Furkan Yaman (TUR); W 15-13	1st place, gold medalist(s)
Furkan Yaman	Sabre	Fraboulet (FRA); L 0-5	Cantini (ITA); W 5-3	Moataz (EGY); L 3-5	Madrigal (ESP); W 5-3	—N/a	Cavaliere (ITA); W 15-11	Mastrullo (ITA); W 15-8	Madrigal (ESP); W 15-4	Enver Yıldırım (TUR); L 13-15	2nd place, silver medalist(s)
Enes Talha Kalender	Sabre	Ferjani (TUN); L 4-5	Ibrihen (ALG); W 5-3	Mastrullo (ITA); L 1-5	Krajnc (SLO); W 5-4	Hospital (FRA); W 5-2	Fraboulet (FRA); W 15-10	Ferjani (TUN); L 12-15	Did not advance		8
Kıvanç Kırtay	Foil						Did not advance				15
Halis Efe Elibol	Epee						Did not advance				21

Women

== Football ==
Team roster

- Egemen Aydın
- Onuralp Çevikkan
- Ensar Buğra Tivsiz
- Devran Bozardıç
- Ömer Arda Kara
- Muhammed İyyad Kadıoğlu
- Arda Ünyay
- Miraç Şimşek
- Oğuzhan Yılmaz
- Ege Arslan
- Muhammet Zeki Dursun
- Berat Luş
- Veis Yıldız
- Berkay Aslan
- Ömer Faruk Duymaz
- İsmail Esat Buğa
- Arda Usluoğlu
- Emir Tuğra Turhan

Head coach: (Turkey) Uğur İnceman

Key:

- A.E.T – After extra time.
- P – Match decided by penalty-shootout.

Team	Event	Group Stage					Semifinal	Final / BM	
Team	Event	Opposition Score	Opposition Score	Opposition Score	Opposition Score	Rank	Opposition Score	Opposition Score	Rank
Turkey	Men's tournament	—N/a	Morocco; T 2-2	North Macedonia; W 3-0	Tunisia; L 1-2	3	Did not advance		5

== Roller sports ==
=== Skateboarding ===
Men

Athlete	Event	Result
Berke Dikişcioğlu	Men's street	8th
Emirhan Sarımustafaoğlu	Men's street	12th

Women

Athlete	Event	Result
Safa Merve Nalçacı	Women's street	6th

== Shooting ==
Men

Athlete	Event	Qualification	Rank	Final	Rank
İsmail Keleş	10 m air pistol	576-17x	4 Q	236.8	1st place, gold medalist(s)
Buğra Selimzade	10 m air pistol	574-13x	7 Q	218.9	3rd place, bronze medalist(s)
Ömer Akgün	10 m air rifle	627.8	7 Q	206.3	4
Mert Nalbant	10 m air rifle	626.2	12	Did not advance	
Yavuz İlnam	Trap	118	9	Did not advance	
Nedim Tolga Tuncer	Trap	112	22	Did not advance	
Muhammet Kaya	Skeet	120	3 Q	31	2nd place, silver medalist(s)
Mustafa Serhat Şahin	Skeet	116	8 Q	19	6

Women

Athlete	Event	Qualification	Rank	Final	Rank
Şevval İlayda Tarhan	10 m air pistol	573-20x	1 Q	216.5	3rd place, bronze medalist(s)
Şimal Yılmaz	10 m air pistol	570-12x	5 Q	154.7	6
Elif Eren	10 m air rifle	622.8	13	Did not advance	
Damla Köse	10 m air rifle	631.1	2 Q	208.0	4
Nur Banu Balkancı	Skeet	115	5 Q	23	4
Çiğdem Özyaman	Skeet	115	4 Q	30	2nd place, silver medalist(s)
Safiye Sarıtürk Temizdemir	Trap	118	1 Q	28	1st place, gold medalist(s)
Rümeysa Pelin Kaya	Trap	113	9	Did not advance	

Mixed events

Athlete	Event	Qualification	Rank	Final	Rank
Buğra Selimzade; Şevval İlayda Tarhan	10 m air pistol	573-16x	3 Q	471.9	2nd place, silver medalist(s)
İsmail Keleş; Şimal Yılmaz	10 m air pistol	576-18x	1 Q	476.1	1st place, gold medalist(s)
Ömer Akgün; Elif Eren	10 m air rifle	625.5	10	Did not advance	
Damla Köse; Mert Nalbant	10 m air rifle	630.0	2 Q	437.2	3rd place, bronze medalist(s)
Yavuz İlnam; Safiye Sarıtürk Temizdemir	Trap	143	4 Q	36	1st place, gold medalist(s)
Rümeysa Pelin Kaya; Nedim Tolga Tuncer	Trap	139	6	Did not advance	

== Table tennis ==
Men

Athlete	Event	Round of 32	Round of 16	Quarterfinals	Semifinals	Final / BM	
Athlete	Event	Opposition Result	Opposition Result	Opposition Result	Opposition Result	Opposition Result	Rank
İbrahim Gündüz	Men's singles	Theofanous (CYP); W 4-0	Ouaiche (ALG); L 3-4	Did not advance			9
Görkem Öcal	Men's singles	Zaza (SYR); W 4-0	Bouloussa (ALG); L 0-4	Did not advance			9
İbrahim Gündüz; Görkem Öcal; Tugay Şirzat Yılmaz; Abdullah Talha Yiğenler	Men's team	—N/a	San Marino (SMR); W 3-0	France (FRA); L 2-3	Did not advance		5

Women

Athlete	Event	Round of 32	Round of 16	Quarterfinals	Semifinals	Final / BM	
Athlete	Event	Opposition Result	Opposition Result	Opposition Result	Opposition Result	Opposition Result	Rank
Sibel Altınkaya	Women's singles	Gerasimatou (GRE); W 4-1	Surjan (SRB); L 0-4	Did not advance			9
Ece Haraç	Women's singles	Chiri (LBN); W 4-0	Meshref (EGY); W 4-0	Lupulesku (SRB); L 2-4	Did not advance		5
Sibel Altınkaya; Ece Haraç; Simay Kulakçeken; Özge Yılmaz	Women's team	—N/a	Syria (SYR); W 3-0	France (FRA); W 3-0	Italy (ITA); L 2-3	Serbia (SRB); L 0-3	4

Mixed

Athlete	Event	Round of 32	Round of 16	Quarterfinals	Semifinals	Final / BM	
Athlete	Event	Opposition Result	Opposition Result	Opposition Result	Opposition Result	Opposition Result	Rank
Ece Haraç; Abdullah Talha Yiğenler	Mixed doubles	—N/a	Spain (ESP); W 3-1	Tunisia (TUN); W 3-0	Italy (ITA); W 3-2	Egypt (EGY); W 3-2	1st place, gold medalist(s)

== Taekwondo ==
Men

Athlete	Event	Round of 16	Quarterfinals	Semifinals	Final	Rank
Enes Kaplan	58 kg	Bye	Boukarnia (FRA); W 2-0	Harbi (ALG); W 2-0	Teskera (CRO); W 2-0	1st place, gold medalist(s)
Berkay Erer	68 kg	Merdanaj (ALB); W 2-0	Golubić (CRO); L 1-2	DNA		5
Yiğithan Kılıç	80 kg	Papadopoulos (GRE); L 0-2	DNA			9
Hüseyin Demircioğlu	+80 kg	Bye	Šapina (CRO); W 2-1	Georgievski (MKD); L 0-2	DNA	3rd place, bronze medalist(s)

Women

Athlete	Event	Round of 16	Quarterfinals	Semifinals	Final	Rank
Elif Sude Akgül	48 kg	Bye	Barroso (POR); W 2-0	Krim (FRA); W 2-1	Hinić (CRO); W 2-0	1st place, gold medalist(s)
Hatice Kübra İlgün	57 kg	Boukhalfao (ALG); W 2-0	Lukić (SRB); W 2-1	Avdagić (BIH); W 2-1	Dehhaoui (MAR); W 1-1^{DSQ}	1st place, gold medalist(s)
Işıl Zafer	67 kg	Bye	García (ESP); W 2-1	Laaraj (MAR); W 2-1	Masghouni (TUN); W 2-0	1st place, gold medalist(s)
Sude Uzunçavdar	+67 kg	Bye	Rudolf (SLO); W 2-0	Zurdo (ESP); W 2-1	Šević (SRB); W 2-0	1st place, gold medalist(s)

== Tennis ==
Men

Athlete	Event	Round of 32	Round of 16	Quarterfinals	Semifinals	Final / BM	
Athlete	Event	Opposition Score	Opposition Score	Opposition Score	Opposition Score	Opposition Score	Rank
Mert Alkaya	Men's singles	Bye	Abderrahman (TUN); L 1-2	Did not advance			9
Tuncay Duran	Men's singles	Bye	Ouakaa (TUN); W 2-0	Rocha (POR); L 0-2	Did not advance		5
Arda Azkara; Mert Alkaya	Men's double	—N/a	Bye	Dlimi / Lalami (MAR); L 1-2	Did not advance		5

Women

Athlete	Event	Round of 32	Round of 16	Quarterfinals	Semifinals	Final / BM	
Athlete	Event	Opposition Score	Opposition Score	Opposition Score	Opposition Score	Opposition Score	Rank
Berfu Cengiz	Women's singles	Bye	Cid (ESP); L 1-2	Did not advance			9
Çağla Büyükakçay	Women's singles	Bye	Papakyriacou (CYP); W 2-0	Kabbaj (MAR); L 1-2	Did not advance		5
Berfu Cengiz; Çağla Büyükakçay	Women's double	—N/a		El Jardi / Kabbaj (MAR); W 2-0	Korokozidi / Matoula (GRE); L 0-2	Llorca / Cid (ESP); W 2-0	3rd place, bronze medalist(s)

Mixed

Athlete	Event	Round of 16	Quarterfinals	Semifinals	Final / BM	
Athlete	Event	Opposition Score	Opposition Score	Opposition Score	Opposition Score	Rank
İrem Kurt; Arda Azkara	Mixed double	Bye	Matias / Rocha (POR); L 0-2	Did not advance		5

== Volleyball ==
Summary

Team	Event	Group stage					Semifinal	Final / BM	
Team	Event	Opposition Score	Opposition Score	Opposition Score	Opposition Score	Rank	Opposition Score	Opposition Score	Rank
Turkey men's	Men's tournament	Egypt; W 3–1	Kosovo; W 3–2	Greece; W 3–0	Spain; W 3–1	1 Q	France; L 2–3	Italy; L 2–3	4

Team	Event	Group stage					Semifinal	Final	
Team	Event	Opposition Score	Opposition Score	Opposition Score	Opposition Score	Rank	Opposition Score	Opposition Score	Rank
Turkey women's	Women's tournament	North Macedonia; W 3–0	Algeria; W 3–0	Kosovo; W 3–0	Greece; W 3–1	1 Q	Serbia; W 3–1	Italy; W 3–0	1st place, gold medalist(s)

=== Men's tournament ===
- Ömercan Burak Karahan
- Muhammed Kaya
- Ertuğrul Gazi Metin
- Halit Kurtuluş
- Yunus Emre Tayaz
- Umut Özdemir
- Yasin Aydın
- Yiğit Hamza Aslan
- Ahmetcan Büyükgöz
- Batuhan Avcı
- Cafer Kirkit
- Berk Dilmenler
- Can Koç
- Head coach: (Turkey) Cemal Bora Şensoy

Group B

Pos	Team	Pld	W	L	Pts	SW	SL	SR	SPW	SPL	SPR	Qualification
1	Turkey	4	4	0	11	12	4	3.000	384	335	1.146	Final round
2	Greece	4	3	1	9	9	4	2.250	321	275	1.167	Final round
3	Spain	4	2	2	6	8	6	1.333	343	310	1.106	
4	Egypt	4	1	3	3	4	9	0.444	272	295	0.922	
5	Kosovo	4	0	4	1	2	12	0.167	229	334	0.686	

Source: Taranto 2026

=== Women's tournament ===
- 1 Simay Kurt
- 4 Tuğba İvegin
- 5 Merve Atlıer
- 8 Defne Başyolcu
- 10 İdil Naz Başcan
- 12 Arelya Karasoy Koçaş (C)
- 13 Dilay Özdemir
- 14 Liza Safronova
- 16 Berka Buse Özden
- 26 Begüm Kaçmaz
- 34 Beren Yeşilırmak
- 77 Aylin Uysalcan
- Head coach: (Turkey) Gökhan Durmaz
- Asst. coach: (Turkey) Hakan Can Turan

Group B

Pos	Team	Pld	W	L	Pts	SW	SL	SR	SPW	SPL	SPR	Qualification
1	Turkey	4	4	0	12	12	1	12.000	322	190	1.695	Final round
2	Greece	4	3	1	9	10	4	2.500	319	258	1.236	Final round
3	Kosovo	4	2	2	6	6	7	0.857	287	281	1.021	
4	North Macedonia	4	1	3	3	5	10	0.500	283	342	0.827	
5	Algeria	4	0	4	0	1	12	0.083	185	325	0.569	

Source: Taranto 2026

== Weightlifting ==
Men

Athlete	Event	Snatch		Clean & jerk	
Athlete	Event	Result	Rank	Result	Rank
Ferdi Hardal	65 kg	132	2nd place, silver medalist(s)	156	3rd place, bronze medalist(s)
Yusuf Fehmi Genç	75 kg	153	2nd place, silver medalist(s)	187	1st place, gold medalist(s)
Kerem Kurnaz	85 kg	153	4	180	5
Hakan Şükrü Kurnaz	95 kg	—N/a	9	175	7
Muhammed Emin Burun	110 kg	161	8	190	4

Women

Athlete	Event	Snatch		Clean & jerk	
Athlete	Event	Result	Rank	Result	Rank
Cansel Özkan	53 kg	91	1st place, gold medalist(s)	101	3rd place, bronze medalist(s)
Aysel Özkan	61 kg	96	2nd place, silver medalist(s)	—N/a	9
Nuray Güngör	69 kg	—N/a	11	124	3rd place, bronze medalist(s)
Tuğbanur Koz	77 kg	104	3rd place, bronze medalist(s)	117	3rd place, bronze medalist(s)

== Wrestling ==
Men's Freestyle

Athlete	Event	Round of 16	Quarterfinal	Semifinal	Repechage	Final / BM	Rank		
Muhammet Karavuş	57 kg	Galbouraev (FRA); W 8-2	Pirrone (ITA); W 10-0	Altabbaa (SYR); W 10-0	—	Usinova (MKD); W 12-2	1st place, gold medalist(s)		
Ahmet Duman	65 kg	Bye	Álvarez (ESP); W 11-1	Laribi (ALG); W 6-4	—	Abakarov (ALB); W 4-2	1st place, gold medalist(s)		
Yasin Yeşil	74 kg	Aisha (SYR); W 10-0	Ikkal (ALG); W 9-4	Vejseli (MKD); L 3-5	—	Mourad (EGY); W 13-3	3rd place, bronze medalist(s)		
İsmail Küçüksolak	86 kg	Bye	Magamadov (FRA); W 11-1	Iglesias (ESP); W 5-0	—	Kuyumçidis (GRE); L 0-8	2nd place, silver medalist(s)		
Athlete	Event	Group stage			Group rank	Semifinal	Repechage	Final / BM	Rank
Resul Güne	97 kg	Viskhanov (FRA); L 8-12	Honis (ITA); W 10-3	Salahel (EGY); W 14-2	2	Kurugliyev (GRE); L 2-13	—	Viskhanov (FRA); W 6-6	3rd place, bronze medalist(s)
Hakan Büyükçıngıl	125 kg	Khelif (ALG); W 10-0	Sheyatan (EGY); W 10-5	—	1	Conyedo (ITA); W 5-1	—	Sheyatan (EGY); W 4-3	1st place, gold medalist(s)

Greco-Roman

Athlete	Event	Round of 16	Quarterfinal	Semifinal	Repechage	Final / BM	Rank
Ekrem Öztürk	60 kg	Bye	Alosta (SYR); L 4-8	DNA			7
Murat Fırat	67 kg	Loureiro (POR); G 8-0	Nifri (FRA); G 3-0	Abdelrehim (EGY); L 0-2	—	Etlinger (CRO); L 5-1	3rd place, bronze medalist(s)
Yunus Emre Başar	77 kg	Kupi (ALB); W 5-0	Doulache (ALG); W 7-2 W 5-0	Alameldine (EGY); W 6-4	—	Kamenjaševiće (CRO); W 2-1	1st place, gold medalist(s)
Doğan Kaya	87 kg	Bye	Pagkalidis (GRE); W 5-1	Dyab (EGY); L 3-12^{DSQ}	—	Nemeš (SRB); L 5-7	3rd place, bronze medalist(s)
Beytullah Kayışdağ	97 kg	Kesidis (GRE); L 3-3	Samen (FRA); W 9-0	Komarov (SRB); L 1-4	—	DNA	5

Women's Freestyle

Athlete	Event	Round of 16	Quarterfinal	Semifinal	Final / BM	Rank
Zehra Demirhan	50 kg	Liuzzi (ITA); W 4-2	Ayachi (TUN); W 12-0	Haemmerle (FRA); W 10-0	Gkika (GRE); W 7-1	1st place, gold medalist(s)
Zeynep Yetgil	53 kg	—	Prevolarak (GRE); W R	Debien (FRA); W 2-1	Jaume (ESP); W 10-0	1st place, gold medalist(s)
Elvira Kamaloğlu	57 kg	—	Jeljeli (TUN); W 8-1	Rinella (ITA); W 11-0	Pérez (ESP); W 4-0	1st place, gold medalist(s)
Ebru Dağbaşı	62 kg	Jakovljević (SRB); W 4-1	Danise (ITA); W 6-3	Hamdun (EGY); W 3-3	Douarre (FRA); L 1-3	2nd place, silver medalist(s)
Nesrin Baş	68 kg	Bye	Lecarpentier (FRA); W 6-0	Khamis (EGY); W 10-0	Godino (ITA); W 4-2	1st place, gold medalist(s)
Kadriye Aksoy Koçak	76 kg	Rinaldi (ITA); W 3-2	Bouregba (ALG); W 4-0	Dacher (FRA); W 10-0	Amir (EGY); L 3-5	2nd place, silver medalist(s)
