= Greece at the 2026 Mediterranean Games =

- IOC code: GRE
- NOC: Hellenic Olympic Committee

in Taranto, Italy 20 August 2026 – 3 September 2026
- Competitors: 281 (157 men and 124 women)
- Medals Ranked 3rd: Gold 26 Silver 26 Bronze 19 Total 71

Mediterranean Games appearances (overview)
- 1951; 1955; 1959; 1963; 1967; 1971; 1975; 1979; 1983; 1987; 1991; 1993; 1997; 2001; 2005; 2009; 2013; 2018; 2022; 2026

Greece competed at the 2026 Mediterranean Games in Taranto, Italy from 20 August to 3 September 2026. The Greek team won 26 gold medals (71 medals in total), marking its second-best performance ever at the Mediterranean Games, after 2001 in Tunis. In addition, Greece finished third in the medal table, achieving its best-ever ranking in the history of the Games.

== Medals by sport ==
Medals by sport
Sport	1st place, gold medalist(s)	2nd place, silver medalist(s)	3rd place, bronze medalist(s)	Total	Rank
Rowing	7	2	1	10	1
Swimming	6	7	5	18	2
Finswimming	5	2	2	9	2
Wrestling	2	1	1	4	3
Sailing	1	1	1	3	3
Artistic gymnastics	1	1	0	2	6
Tennis	1	1	0	2	3
Fencing	1	0	0	1	5
Judo	1	0	0	1	9
Triathlon	1	0	0	1	2
Athletics	0	5	1	6	14
Weightlifting	0	3	0	3	7
Shooting	0	1	1	2	7
Handball	0	1	1	2	3
Volleyball	0	1	0	1	4
Badminton	0	0	2	2	6
Taekwondo	0	0	2	2	8
Boxing	0	0	1	1	11
Karate	0	0	1	1	14

== 3x3 basketball ==
Athletes	Event	Group matches				Quarterfinals	Semifinals	Final / BM	
Athletes	Event	Opposition Score	Opposition Score	Opposition Score	Rank	Opposition Score	Opposition Score	Opposition Score	Rank
Evangelos Giannoulakis; Obinna-Williams Ezeja; Angelos Onoufrios Raptidis; Ilias Renieris	Men's Tournament	Egypt; W 21-17	(France) France; L 14-20	—N/a	2 Q	Italy L 11-17	Did not advance		8
Amalia Ieronymaki; Christina Ntaiaki; Georgia Pagoni; Anna Maria Prifti	Women's Tournament	(Kosovo) Kosovo; W 18-9	(Italy) Italy; L 11-13	—N/a	2 Q	(Spain) Spain; L 8-20	Did not advance		6

== Archery ==
Men

Athlete	Event	Ranking round		Round of 64	Round of 32	Round of 16	Quarterfinals	Semifinals	Final / BM	
Athlete	Event	Score	Seed	Opposition Score	Opposition Score	Opposition Score	Opposition Score	Opposition Score	Opposition Score	Rank
Evangelos Charisis	Individual	606	21	Bye	Akkoyun (TUR); L 2-6	Did not advance				32
Alexandros Karageorgiou	Individual	589	25	Bye	Tumer (TUR); L 0-6	Did not advance				25
Panagiotis Themelis	Individual	571	31	Mala (KOS); W 6-2	Gazoz (TUR); L 0-6	Did not advance				27
Evangelos Charisis; Alexandros Karageorgiou; Panagiotis Themelis	Team	—N/a				El Helali / Panagi / Thoma (CYP); W 6-0	Borsani / Gregori / Mandia (ITA); L 2-6	Did not advance		6

Women

Athlete	Event	Ranking round		Round of 32	Round of 16	Quarterfinals	Semifinals	Final / BM	
Athlete	Event	Score	Seed	Opposition Score	Opposition Score	Opposition Score	Opposition Score	Opposition Score	Rank
Anatoli Martha Gkorila	Individual	599	17	Konnova (CYP); W 7-3	Francesco (ITA); L 0-6	Did not advance			11
Maria Nasoula	Individual	607	13	Cesarini (SMR); W 7-1	Lopez (FRA); W 6-2	Gokkir (TUR); L 3-7	Did not advance		7
Evangelia Psarra	Individual	627	10	Bellal (ALG); W 7-1	Rebagliati (ITA); L 2-6	Did not advance			14
Anatoli Martha Gkorila; Maria Nasoula; Evangelia Psarra	Team	—N/a				Barbelin / Lopez / Randriantsara (FRA); L 4-5	Did not advance		5

Mixed

Athlete	Event	Round of 16	Quarterfinals	Semifinals	Final / BM	
Athlete	Event	Opposition Score	Opposition Score	Opposition Score	Opposition Score	Rank
Evangelia Psarra; Evangelos Charisis	Mixed team	Bye	Yenihayat (TUR); Gazoz (TUR); L 3-5	Did not advance		7

== Athletics ==
=== Men ===
Track and road events

Athlete	Event					Final	
Athlete	Event	Result	Rank	Result	Rank	Result	Rank
Sotirios Garaganis	100m					10.60	7
Ioannis Voskopoulos	100m			10.65	9	did not advance	
Vasileios Myrianthopoulos	200m					did not advance	
Nikolaos Panagiotopoulos	200m					did not advance	
Christos-Panagiotis Roumtsios	110 m hurdles	14.34 (-3,4w)	9	Did not advance			
Dimitris Levantinos	400 m hurdles	DNF		Did not advance			
Spyridon-Ioannis Konidaris	400 m					47.39	15
Christoforos Koutlis	800 m						13
Ioannis Voskopoulos; Nikolaos Panagiotopoulos; Sotirios Garaganis; Vasileios Myrianthopoulos	4 × 100 m relay					39.42	4

Field events

Athlete	Event	Qualification		Final	
Athlete	Event	Distance	Position	Distance	Position
Antonios Merlos	High jump			2.19	2nd place, silver medalist(s)
Nikolaos Stamatonikolos	Long jump			7.83	6
Konstantinos Gennikis	Shot put			18.89	8
Dimitrios Pavlidis	Discus throw			60,93	5
Christos Frantzeskakis	Hammer throw			77.59	2nd place, silver medalist(s)
Georgios Papanastasiou	Hammer throw			74.42	5

=== Women ===
Track and road events

Athlete	Event					Final	
Athlete	Event	Result	Rank	Result	Rank	Result	Rank
Polyniki Emmanouilidou	100m			11.55	2 Q	11.41	2nd place, silver medalist(s)
Dimitra Tsoukala	100m					11.72	7
Rafaéla Spanoudaki-Hatziriga	200m			23.09	1 Q	23.07 SB	2nd place, silver medalist(s)
Anastasia Rapti	400m			53.69	11	did not advance	
Emmanouela Plaka	800m					2:01.67	7
Sofia Iosifidou	100 m hurdles			13.67	9	Did not advance	
Dimitra Gnafaki	400 m hurdles					58.35	6
Sofia Iosifidou; Rafaéla Spanoudaki-Hatziriga; Dimitra Tsoukala; Polyniki Emmanouilidou	4 × 100 m relay					43.61	2nd place, silver medalist(s)

Field events

Athlete	Event	Qualification		Final	
Athlete	Event	Distance	Position	Distance	Position
Panagiota Dosi	High jump			1.87 SB	6
Natalia Besi	Long jump			6.30	6
Maria Magkoulia	Shot put			15.37	6
Ariadni Adamopoulou	Pole vault			4.05	7
Chrysoula Anagnostopoulou	Discus throw			56.59	6
Stamatia Scarvelis	Hammer throw			66.27	4

=== Mixed events ===
Athlete	Event					Final	
Athlete	Event	Result	Rank	Result	Rank	Result	Rank
Vasileios Myrianthopoulos; Rafaéla Spanoudaki-Hatziriga; Sotirios Garaganis; Polyniki Emmanouilidou	4 × 100 m relay					41.74 NR	3rd place, bronze medalist(s)
Spyridon-Ioannis Konidaris; Dimitra Gnafaki; Dimitris Levantinos; Anastasia Rapti	4 × 400 m relay					3:23.65	4

== Badminton ==
Athlete	Event	Round of 32	Round of 16	Quarter-final	Semi-final	Final / BM	
Athlete	Event	Opposition Score	Opposition Score	Opposition Score	Opposition Score	Opposition Score	Rank
Stamatis Tsigkirdakis	Men's singles	Marreiros Gloria (POR); L 0-2	Did not advance				17
Evangelos Stavros Anastasiou; Theodoros Papadopoulos	Men's double	—N/a	Massetti / Salutt (ITA); L 0-2	Did not advance			9
Grammatoula Sotiriou	Women's singles	Clark (MLT); W 2-0	Teruel Roman (ESP); W 2-1	Latif (EGY); W 2-1	Hamza (ITA); L 1-2	Did not advance	3rd place, bronze medalist(s)
Theodora Lamprianidou; Eleni Moutevelidou	Women's double	—N/a	Clark / Clark (MLT); W 2-1	Latif / Kamal (EGY); W 2-1	Ercetine / Inci (TUR); L 0-2	Did not advance	3rd place, bronze medalist(s)
Michail Marios Boulios; Grammatoula Sotiriou	Mixed double	Bye	Tomic / Vitman (SRB); L 0-2	Did not advance			9

== Boxing ==
Men

Athlete	Event	Round of 16	Quarterfinals	Semifinals	Final	
Athlete	Event	Opposition Result	Opposition Result	Opposition Result	Opposition Result	Rank
Georgios Pleas	Men's - 60 kg	Seifelyazal (EGY); W RSC	Marin Hernandez (ESP); L 0-5	Did not advance		5
Zacharias Mylonas	Men's - 70 kg	Hebibovic (BIH); W 5-0	Djemmal (FRA); L 1-4	Did not advance		5
Michail Tsamalidis	Men's - 80 kg	Koci (ALB); W 5-0	Simic (SRB); W RSC	Abdou (ALG); L DQB	Did not advance	—N/a
Panagiota Kouzilou	Women's - 57 kg	—N/a	Zidani (FRA); L RSC	Did not advance		5
Sofia Legaki	Women's - 60 kg	—N/a	Bye	Sadiku (KOS); L 0-5	Did not advance	3rd place, bronze medalist(s)

== Fencing ==
Athlete	Event	Group Stage						Round of 32	Round of 16	Quarterfinal	Semifinal	Final / BM	
Athlete	Event	Opposition Score	Opposition Score	Opposition Score	Opposition Score	Opposition Score	Rank	Opposition Score	Opposition Score	Opposition Score	Opposition Score	Opposition Score	Rank
Panagiotis Theodoropoulos	Men's épee	Markota (CRO); L 2-4	Talib (LBA); W 5-1	Bundaleski (MKD); L 1-5	Elsayed (EGY); L 3-5	Piatti (ITA); W 5-2	4 q	El Choueiry (LBN); W 15-10	Mohsen (EGY); W 15-12	Frazao (POR); L 11-15	Did not advance		8
Artemios Tzovanis	Men's épee	Chemali (LBN); L 1-5	Mohsen (EGY); L 1-4	Frazao (POR); W 3-0	Damjanoski (MKD); W 5-4	Fontana (VAT); W 5-0	3 q	Damjanoski (MKD); W 15-13	Shamel (EGY); L 11-15	Did not advance			13
Nikolaos Kontochristopoulos	Men's foil	Cuk (SRB); L 3-5	Spoljar (CRO); W 5-3	Roger (FRA); L 1-5	Lombardi (ITA); L 2-5	—N/a	4 q	—N/a	Hamza (EGY); L 8-15	Did not advance			12
Panagiotis Kontoeidis	Men's sabre	Choueiry (FRA); L 1-5	Cavaliere (ITA); L 4-5	Yildirim (TUR); L 1-5	Bounabi (ALG); W 5-3	Hesham (EGY); L 1-5	5	—N/a	Did not advance				15
Andriana Theodoropoulou	Women's épee	Marzani (ITA); L 0-5	Boukhelifa (ALG); L 4-5	Cebe (TUR); W 5-4	Francillonne (FRA); W 5-4	—N/a	2 q	—N/a	Zebboudj (ALG); W 15-4	Vanryssel (FRA); L 10-14	Did not advance		7
Maria-Eleni Chaldaiou	Women's foil	Bertini (ITA); L 1-5	Soussi (TUN); W 5-2	Atmaca (FRA); W 5-1	Atmaca (TUN); W 5-1	—N/a	2 Q	—N/a	Bye	Tucker (ESP); L 5-15	Did not advance		6
Aikaterini-Maria Kontochristopoulou	Women's foil	Amr Hossny (EGY); W 5-3	Catarzi (FRA); W 5-1	B'Chir (TUN); W 5-4	Molinari (ITA); L 1-5	—N/a	3 q	—N/a	Blazic (CRO); W 15-13	Palumbo (ITA); W 15-8	Tucker (ESP); W 15-11	Amr Hossny (EGY); W 15-13	1st place, gold medalist(s)
Despina Georgiadou	Women's sabre	Mormile (ITA); L 2-5	Martin-Portugues (ESP); L 1-5	Gungor (TUR); W 5-3	Vongsavady (FRA); W 5-3	—N/a	3 q	—N/a	Manga (FRA); W 15-10	Erbil (TUR); L 13-15	Did not advance		7
Theodora Gkountoura	Women's sabre	Kehli (ALG); W 5-2	Erbil (TUR); L 1-5	Fusetti (ITA); L 4-5	Berder (FRA); W 5-4	—N/a	3 q	—N/a	Fusetti (ITA); W 14-14	Martin-Portugues (ESP); L 13-15	Did not advance		8

== Finswimming ==
Men

Athlete	Event	Heat		Semifinal		Final	
Athlete	Event	Time	Rank	Time	Rank	Time	Rank
	50 m apnoea						
Georgios Kaltsoukalas	100 m surface	37.31	9	—N/a		Did not advance	
Angelos Korompylis	100 m surface	36.29	2 q	—N/a		35.31	2nd place, silver medalist(s)
	200 m surface						
Ilias Kalfidis	400 m surface	3:09.65	3 q	—N/a		3:06.86	4
	50 m bi-fins						
Ioannis Ioakeimidis	100 m bi-fins	45.09	8 q	—N/a		45.60	8
Georgios Kousis	100 m bi-fins	46.56	12	—N/a		Did not advance	
	200 m bi-fins						
Georgios Kousis	400 m bi-fins	3:38.75	7 q	—N/a		3:36.44	5

Women

Athlete	Event	Heat		Semifinal		Final	
Athlete	Event	Time	Rank	Time	Rank	Time	Rank
Maria Iliaki	50 m apnoea	DSQ		—N/a		Did not advance	
Ifigeneia Teliousi	50 m apnoea	16.79	2 q	—N/a		16.60	1st place, gold medalist(s)
	100 m surface						
Anna Filoglou	200 m surface	1:35.17	6 q	—N/a		1:35.29	7
Ifigeneia Teliousi	200 m surface	1:34.33	3 q	—N/a		1:31.42	1st place, gold medalist(s)
	400 m surface						
Anna Leonardi	400 m surface						
Ioanna Tsalouchou	50 m bi-fins	22.98	4 q	—N/a		22.70	3rd place, bronze medalist(s)
	100 m bi-fins						
Giolanda Kaperda	200 m bi-fins	1:50.63	6 q	—N/a		1:49.79	5
	400 m bi-fins						

Mixed

Athlete	Event	Heat		Semifinal		Final	
Athlete	Event	Time	Rank	Time	Rank	Time	Rank
	4x50 m bi-fins						
Maria Iliaki; Georgios Kaltsoukalas; Angelos Korompylis; Ifigeneia Teliousi	4x100 m surface	—N/a				2:31.86	1st place, gold medalist(s)

== Gymnastic Rhythmic ==
Athlete	Event	Qualification						Final					
Athlete	Event	Hoop	Clubs	Ball	Ribbon	Total	Rank	Hoop	Clubs	Ball	Ribbon	Total	Rank
Anastasia Maria Kagkalou	All around	21.850	26.100	22.300	24.000	72.400	13	Did not advance					
Panagiota Lytra	All around	24.950	23.250	22.500	23.850	72.050	14	Did not advance					

== Handball ==
Summary

Key:

- A.E.T – After extra time.
- P – Match decided by penalty-shootout.

Team	Event	Group Stage						Quarterfinal	Semifinal	Final / BM	
Team	Event	Opposition Score	Opposition Score	Opposition Score	Opposition Score	Opposition Score	Rank	Opposition Score	Opposition Score	Opposition Score	Rank
Greece men's	Men's tournament	Tunisia; W 37-29	Algeria; T 26-26	Cyprus; W 39-24	—N/a		1 Q	—N/a	Portugal; W 32-30	Egypt; L 29-31	2nd place, silver medalist(s)
Greece women's	Women's tournament	North Macedonia; W 31-25	Kosovo; W 40-20	Tunisia; L 28-41	Algeria; W 35-24	Italy; L 24-27	3 Q	—N/a		Algeria; W 29-25	3rd place, bronze medalist(s)

== Judo ==
Men

Athlete	Event	Round of 16	Quarterfinals	Semifinals	Repechage 1	Repechage 2	Final / BM	
Athlete	Event	Opposition Result	Opposition Result	Opposition Result	Opposition Result	Opposition Result	Opposition Result	Rank
Nikolaos Gkinis	Men's 73 kg	Esposito (ITA); L Yuko (0–3)	Did not advance					
Michail Tsoutlasvili	Men's 81 kg	Belbelhout (ALG); L Ippon (0–110)	Did not advance					
Theodoros Tselidis	Men's 90 kg	Bye	Arı (TUR); L Penalty (0–100)	Did not advance	Raičević (MNE); L Yuko (0–1)	Did not advance		
Athanasios Mylonelis	Men's 100 kg	Pavloski (MKD); W Yuko (1–0)	Bulaja (SRB); L Ippon (0–100)	Did not advance	Zekaj (KOS); L Ippon (0–100)	Did not advance		
Panagiotis Papanikolaou	Men's +100 kg	Gadeau (MON); W Waza-ari (10–0)	Tataroğlu (TUR); L Ippon (0–100)	Did not advance	Vračar (SRB); L Waza-ari (0–10)	Did not advance		

Women

Athlete	Event	Round of 16	Quarterfinals	Semifinals	Repechage 1	Repechage 2	Final / BM	
Athlete	Event	Opposition Result	Opposition Result	Opposition Result	Opposition Result	Opposition Result	Opposition Result	Rank
Maria-Eleni Gogua	Women's 52 kg	Siderot (POR); L Yuko (0–1)	Did not advance					
Elisavet Teltsidou	Women's 70 kg	Bye	Koren (SLO); W Waza-ari (10–0)	Cvjetko (CRO); W Ippon (100–0)	—N/a		Andric (SRB); W Waza-ari (10–0)	1st place, gold medalist(s)
Maria-Nicoleta Vulpasin	Women's +78 kg	Janjić (SLO); L Penalty (0–110)	Did not advance					

Mixed

Athlete	Event	Round of 16	Quarterfinals	Semifinals	Repechage 1	Repechage 2	Final / BM	
Athlete	Event	Opposition Result	Opposition Result	Opposition Result	Opposition Result	Opposition Result	Opposition Result	Rank
Nikolaos Gkinis; Michail Tsoutlasvili; Theodoros Tselidis; Athanasios Mylonelis; Panagiotis Papanikolaou; Maria-Eleni Gogua; Elisavet Teltsidou; Maria-Nicoleta Vulpasin	Mixed Team	Spain; L 1–4	Did not advance					

== Karate ==
Kumite
Men

Athlete	Event	Round of 32	Round of 16	Quarterfinals	Semifinals	Repechage	Final / BM	
Athlete	Event	Opposition Result	Opposition Result	Opposition Result	Opposition Result	Opposition Result	Opposition Result	Rank
Christos Stefanos Xenos	Men's -60 kg	—N/a	Sabatino (ITA); W 7–0	Arifi (ALB); W 2–1	Selmani (KOS); L 3–11	—N/a	Gavriel (CYP); W 4–1	3rd place, bronze medalist(s)
Georgios Baliotis	Men's -67 kg	Helassa (ALG); W 4–2	Salmi (FRA); W 3–1	Viana Mendes (POR); W 7–3	Belistojanoski (MKD); L 1–5	Bye	Maresca (ITA); L 1–5	5
Konstantinos Mastrogiannis	Men's -84 kg	—N/a	Mikulic (MNE); W 3–2	Abudabous (LBA); L 1–1	Did not advance	Vasiliou (CYP); L 1–3	Did not advance	

Women

Athlete	Event	Round of 32	Round of 16	Quarterfinals	Semifinals	Repechage	Final / BM	
Athlete	Event	Opposition Result	Opposition Result	Opposition Result	Opposition Result	Opposition Result	Opposition Result	Rank
Christina Triada Pappa	Women's -50 kg	—N/a	Bye	Temizel (TUR); W 9–1	Perfetto (ITA); L 2–3	Bye	Sgardelli (CRO); L 0–8	5
Maria Stoli	Women's -61 kg	Bye	Sipović (BIH); L 6–8	Did not advance				
Eirini-Grigoria Katsika	Women's -68 kg	—N/a	Becirovic (CRO); L 0–2	Did not advance				
Kyriaki Kydonaki	Women's +68 kg	—N/a	Bye	Pea (FRA); W 12–2	Damjanović (MNE); L 5–10	Bye	Çekiç (TUR); L 1–2	5

== Padel ==
Athlete	Event	Round of 32	Round of 16	Quarterfinals	Semifinals	Final / BM	
Athlete	Event	Opposition Score	Opposition Score	Opposition Score	Opposition Score	Opposition Score	Rank
Pavlos-Louis Balafas; Vasileios Sioulis	Men's Pairs	Elloumi / Helali (TUN); L 0–2	Did not advance				
Elpida Malamou; Christina Styliani Ntanou	Women's pairs	Elnimr / Hakim (EGY); L 1–2	Did not advance				
Pavlos-Louis Balafas; Christina Styliani Ntanou	Mixed pairs	—N/a	Hakim / Hossam (EGY); W 2–0	Chamli / Elloumi (TUN); W 2–0	Araujo / Araujo (POR); L 0–2	Bahurel / Guichard (FRA); L 0–2	4

== Rowing ==
Men

Athlete	Event	Semifinals		Repechage		Final	
Athlete	Event	Time	Rank	Time	Rank	Time	Rank
Stefanos Ntouskos	Men's single sculls	7:02.44	1 FA	Bye		7:14.17	1st place, gold medalist(s)
Petros Gkaidatzis	Men's lightweight single sculls	7:03.49	1 FA	Bye		7:25.09	1st place, gold medalist(s)
Evangelia Anastasiadou	Women's single sculls	7:37.45	1 FA	Bye		7:52.30	1st place, gold medalist(s)
Zoi Fitsiou	Women's lightweight single sculls	7:51.00	1 FA	Bye		8:11.67	1st place, gold medalist(s)
Nikolaos Cholopoulos; Konstantinos Giannoulis	Men's double sculls	6:23.34	3 fA	Bye		6:32.92	3rd place, bronze medalist(s)
Angelos Athanasiadis-Kaoudis; Paris-Rafail Kotsias	Men's lightweight double sculls	6:38.04	1 FA	Bye		6:33.44	2nd place, silver medalist(s)
Eleni Diavati; Christina Bourmpou	Women's double sculls	7:08.05	1 FA	Bye		7:10.86	1st place, gold medalist(s)
Paschalina Mouratidou; Gavriela Lioliou	Women's lightweight double sculls	7:21.28	1 FA	Bye		7:15.74	2nd place, silver medalist(s)
Stefanos Ntouskos; Evangelia Anastasiadou	Mixed double sculls	7:08.12	1 FA	Bye		6:55.98	1st place, gold medalist(s)
Petros Gkaidatzis; Zoi Fitsiou	Mixed lightweight double sculls	7:23.35	1 FA	Bye		7:04.14	1st place, gold medalist(s)

== Shooting ==
Rifle & pistol

Athlete	Event	Qualification		Final	
Athlete	Event	Points	Rank	Points	Rank
	Men's 10 m air rifle				
	Men's 10 m air pistol				
Anna Bitsani	Women's 10 m air rifle	611.1	22	Did not advance	
Emmanouela Michelaki	Women's 10 m air rifle	617.6	17	Did not advance	
	Women's 10 m air pistol				
	Mixed team 10 m air rifle				
Eytychia Vasiliki Michelaki; Georgios Gampierakis	Mixed team 10 m air pistol	569.0	5		
Dimitra Papakanellou; Georgios Mastrodimitropoulos	Mixed team 10 m air pistol				

Shotgun

Athlete	Event	Qualification		Final	
Athlete	Event	Points	Rank	Points	Rank
Panagiotis Gerochristos	Men's skeet	71	7	20	5
Nikolaos Frantzeskakis	Men's skeet	66	14	0	14
Ioannis Chatzitsakiroglou	Men's trap	121	3 q	28	2nd place, silver medalist(s)
Emmanouela Katzouraki	Women's skeet	63	9	0	9
Anna Maria Markantonaki	Women's skeet	67	8	16	6
	Women's trap				
	Trap mixed team				

== Swimming ==
Men

Athlete	Event	Heat		Final	
Athlete	Event	Time	Rank	Time	Rank
Stergios-Marios Bilas	50 m freestyle	DNS		Did not advance	
Andreas Vazaios	50 m freestyle	22.85	10	Did not advance	
Dimitrios Markos	100 m freestyle	49.84	5 q	49.69	6
Andreas Vazaios	100 m freestyle	49.28	1 q	49.37	3rd place, bronze medalist(s)
Dimitrios Markos	200 m freestyle	1:50.07	5 q	1:47.92	3rd place, bronze medalist(s)
Iason Routoulas	200 m freestyle	1:51.03	11	Did not advance	
Vasileios Kakoulakis	400 m freestyle	3:52.02	6 q	3:51.37	7
Dimitrios Markos	400 m freestyle	3:51.82	3 q	3:47.07	1st place, gold medalist(s)
Vasilleios Kakoulakis	800 m freestyle	—N/a		8:05.46	8
Dimitrios Markos	800 m freestyle	—N/a		7:55.05	2nd place, silver medalist(s)
Savvas Thomoglou	50 m breaststroke	29.00	11	Did not advance	
Marios Zafeiropoulos	50 m breaststroke	29.21	12	Did not advance	
Savvas Thomoglou	100 m breaststroke	1:02.42	7 q	1:02.11	6
Marios Zafeiropoulos	100 m breaststroke	1:03.23	12	Did not advance	
Marios Zafeiropoulos	200 m breaststroke	2:16.63	7 q	2:18.09	8
Savvas Thomoglou	200 m breaststroke	2:15.47	4 q	2:12.66	6
Apostolos Christou	50 m backstroke	24.97	1 q	24.74	1st place, gold medalist(s)
Evangelos Makrygiannis	50 m backstroke	25.30	2 q	25.36	5
Apostolos Christou	100 m backstroke	55.52	4 q	52.34	1st place, gold medalist(s)
Evangelos Makrygiannis	100 m backstroke	55.53	5 q	54.54	3rd place, bronze medalist(s)
Apostolos Papastamos	200 m backstroke	2:03.78	8 q	2:03.40	8
Apostolos Siskos	200 m backstroke	2:01.86	6 q	1:55.95	1st place, gold medalist(s)
Stergios-Marios Bilas	50 m butterfly	23.43	1 q	23.37	3rd place, bronze medalist(s)
Andreas Vazaios	50 m butterfly	24.12	9	Did not advance	
Apostolos Sikos	100 m butterfly	DNS		Did not advance	
Apostolos Siskos	200 m butterfly	2:00.31	6 q	1:58.46	5
Apostolos Papastamos	200 m individual medley	2:02.48	5 q	2:00.86	5
Iason Routoulas	200 m individual medley	2:02.98	7 q	2:02.61	7
Daniil Giourtzidis	400 m individual medley	4:25.06	5 q	4:18.28	2nd place, silver medalist(s)
Apostolos Papastamos	400 m individual medley	4:28.36	8 q	4:19.53	5

Women

Athlete	Event	Heat		Final	
Athlete	Event	Time	Rank	Time	Rank
Anna Ntountounaki	50 m freestyle	25.88	7 q	25.54	5
Anna Avgousta Vlachou	100 m freestyle	56.61	6 q	55.82	5
Artemis Vasilaki	200 m freestyle	DNS		Did not advance	
Artemis Vasilaki	400 m freestyle	DNS		Did not advance	
Artemis Vasilaki	800 m freestyle	—N/a		8:30.02	2nd place, silver medalist(s)
Artemis Vasilaki	1500 m freestyle	—N/a		16:22.15	2nd place, silver medalist(s)
Nikoletta Pavlopoulou	50 m breaststroke	DNS		Did not advance	
Andromachi Tasakou	50 m breaststroke	33.05	13	Did not advance	
Nikoletta Pavlopoulou	100 m breaststroke	1:09.60	6 q	1:09.16	5
Andromachi Tasakou	100 m breaststroke	1:09.75	8 q	1:09.54	7
Eleni Kontogeorgou	200 m breaststroke	2:31.67	8 q	2:32.83	8
Eleni Antoniadou	50 m backstroke	30.05	11	Did not advance	
Eleni Antoniadou	100 m backstroke	1:02.69	5 q	1:02.35	5
Anna Ntountounaki	100 m backstroke	1:04.33	8 q	1:03.60	7
Eleni Antoniadou	200 m backstroke	2:17.40	6 q	2:14.86	5
Anna Ntountounaki	50 m butterfly	26.80	4 q	26.11	1st place, gold medalist(s)
Anna Avgousta Vlachou	50 m butterfly	27.04	6 q	26.91	6
Georgia Damasioti	100 m butterfly	59.77	3 q	58.49	2nd place, silver medalist(s)
Anna Ntountounaki	100 m butterfly	59.90	4 q	58.17	1st place, gold medalist(s)
Georgia Damasioti	200 m butterfly	2:13.62	4 q	2:09.73	2nd place, silver medalist(s)
Nikoletta Pavlopoulou	200 m individual medley	—N/a		2:12.69	3rd place, bronze medalist(s)

Mixed

Athlete	Event	Heat		Final	
Athlete	Event	Time	Rank	Time	Rank
Evangelos Makrygiannis; Andromachi Tasakou; Anna Ntountounaki; Andreas Vazaios	4x100 medley relay	3:59.14	4 q	3:47.89	2nd place, silver medalist(s)

== Table tennis ==
Men

Athlete	Event	Round of 32	Round of 16	Quarterfinals	Semifinals	Final / BM	
Athlete	Event	Opposition Result	Opposition Result	Opposition Result	Opposition Result	Opposition Result	Rank
Ioannis Sgouropoulos	Men's singles	Laine Campino (POR); L 1–4	Did not advance				
Georgios Stamatouros	Men's singles	Essid (TUN); W 4–1	Oyebode (ITA); L 1–4	Did not advance			
Konstantinos Konstantinopoulos; Ioannis Sgouropoulos; Georgios Stamatouros	Men's team	—N/a	Syria (SYR); W 3–0	Egypt (EGY); L 0–3	Did not advance		

Women

Athlete	Event	Round of 32	Round of 16	Quarterfinals	Semifinals	Final / BM	
Athlete	Event	Opposition Result	Opposition Result	Opposition Result	Opposition Result	Opposition Result	Rank
Ioanna Gerasimatou	Women's singles	Altinkaya (TUR); L 1-4	Did not advance				
Aikaterini Toliou	Women's singles	Sager Ogli (SYR); W 4-0	Lupulesku (SRB); L 1–4	Did not advance			
Ioanna Gerasimatou; Malamatenia Papadimitriou; Aikaterini Toliou	Women's team	—N/a	Portugal (POR); L 1-3	Did not advance			

Mixed

Athlete	Event	Round of 32	Round of 16	Quarterfinals	Semifinals	Final / BM
Athlete	Event	Opposition Result	Opposition Result	Opposition Result	Opposition Result	Rank
Georgios Stamatouros; Malamatenia Papadimitriou	Mixed doubles	Bye	Assar / Goda (EGY); L 2-3	Did not advance		

== Taekwondo ==
Athlete	Event	Round of 16	Quarterfinals	Semifinals	Final / BM	
Athlete	Event	Opposition Result	Opposition Result	Opposition Result	Opposition Result	Rank
Ioannis Kafataridis	Men's − 58 kg	Fraile Rodriguez (ESP); L 1-2	Did not advance			
Apostolos Panagopoulos	Men's − 68 kg	Dushku (MNE); W 2-0	Jendoubi (TUN); L 1-2	Did not advance		
Ioannis Papadopoulos	Men's − 80 kg	Kilic (TUR); W 2-0	Zarhouti Mar (MAR); L 0-2	Did not advance		
Vasileios Tholiotis	Men's + 80 kg	Garcia Martinez (ESP); L 0-2	Did not advance			
Styliani Marentaki	Women's − 67 kg	Bye	Zecirovic (SRB); W 2-1	Masghouni (TUN); L 1-2	Did not advance	3rd place, bronze medalist(s)
Agoritsa-Artemia Kitsiou	Women's + 67 kg	Bye	Mediouni (TUN); W 2-1	Sevic (SRB); L 0-2	Did not advance	3rd place, bronze medalist(s)

== Tennis ==
Men

Athlete	Event	Round of 32	Round of 16	Quarterfinals	Semifinals	Final / BM	
Athlete	Event	Opposition Score	Opposition Score	Opposition Score	Opposition Score	Opposition Score	Rank
Dimitris Azoidis	Men's Singles	Jovanovic (MNE); L 0–0 (INJ)	Did not advance				
Ioannis Xylas	Men's Singles	Bye	Delicata (MLT); L 0–0 (WO)	Did not advance			
Dimitris Azoidis; Ioannis Xylas	Men's double	—N/a	Dlimi / Lalami (MAR); L 0–0 (WO)	Did not advance			

Women

Athlete	Event	Round of 32	Round of 16	Quarterfinals	Semifinals	Final / BM	
Athlete	Event	Opposition Score	Opposition Score	Opposition Score	Opposition Score	Opposition Score	Rank
Eleni Korokozidi	Women's Singles	Nikcevic (MNE); L 0–2	Did not advance				
Martha Matoula	Women's Singles	Bye	Mitevska (MKD); W 2–0	Paganetti (ITA); W 2–0	Garcia Cid (ESP); W 2–0	Basiletti (ITA); L 0–2	2nd place, silver medalist(s)
Eleni Korokozidi; Martha Matoula	Women's double	—N/a		Bye	Büyükakçay / Cengiz (TUR); W 2–0	Basiletti / Paganetti (ITA); W 2–0	1st place, gold medalist(s)

Mixed

Athlete	Event	Round of 16	Quarterfinals	Semifinals	Final / BM	
Athlete	Event	Opposition Score	Opposition Score	Opposition Score	Opposition Score	Rank
Martha Matoula; Ioannis Xylas	Mixed double	Nikcevic / Jovanovic (MNE); W 2–1	El Jardi / Lalami (MAR); L 0–2	Did not advance		

== Volleyball ==
Summary

Team	Event	Group Stage						Semifinal	Final / BM
Team	Event	Opposition Score	Opposition Score	Opposition Score	Opposition Score	Rank	Opposition Score	Opposition Score	Rank
Greece men's	Men's tournament	Kosovo; W 3–0	Spain; W 3–1	Egypt; W 3–0	Turkey; L 0–3	2 Q	Italy; W 3–2	France; L 0–3	2nd place, silver medalist(s)
Greece women's	Women's tournament	Kosovo; W 3–0	Algeria; W 3–0	North Macedonia; W 3–1	Turkey; L 1–3	2 Q	Italy; L 0–3	Serbia; L 2–3	4

== Water polo ==
Summary

Team	Group Stage				Semifinal	Final / BM	
Team	Opposition Score	Opposition Score	Opposition Score	Rank	Opposition Score	Opposition Score	Rank
Greece men's	Montenegro; L 14–16	Slovenia; W 22–9	Serbia; L 5–15	3	Turkey; W 21–12	France; L 12–14	6

== Weightlifting ==
Men

Athlete	Event	Snatch		Clean & Jerk	
Athlete	Event	Result	Rank	Result	Rank
Konstantinos Lampridis	Men's 65 kg	80	5	100	5

Women

Athlete	Event	Snatch		Clean & Jerk	
Athlete	Event	Result	Rank	Result	Rank
Maria Stratoudaki	Women's 53 kg	83	2nd place, silver medalist(s)	104	2nd place, silver medalist(s)
Maria Kardara	Women's 61 kg	86	6	107	4
Despoina Polaktsidou	Women's 69 kg	99	4	128	2nd place, silver medalist(s)

== Wrestling ==
Key:

- WO – walkover
- VT (ranking points: 5–0 or 0–5) – Victory by fall.
- VB (ranking points: 5–0 or 0–5) – Victory by injury (VF for forfeit, VA for withdrawal or disqualification)
- PP (ranking points: 3–1 or 1–3) – Decision by points – the loser with technical points.
- PO (ranking points: 3–0 or 0–3) – Decision by points – the loser without technical points.
- ST (ranking points: 4–0 or 0–4) – Great superiority – the loser without technical points and a margin of victory of at least 8 (Greco-Roman) or 10 (freestyle) points.
- SP (ranking points: 4–1 or 1–4) – Technical superiority – the loser with technical points and a margin of victory of at least 8 (Greco-Roman) or 10 (freestyle) points.

Greco-Roman

Athlete	Event	Group Stage				Round of 16	Quarterfinal	Semifinal	Repechage	Final / BM	
Athlete	Event	Opposition Result	Opposition Result	Opposition Result	Rank	Opposition Result	Opposition Result	Opposition Result	Opposition Result	Opposition Result	Rank
Vasileios Tsarouchas	Men's 60 kg	—N/a				Bye	Gharbi (MAR); L PO (0–6)	Did not advance			
Stavros Ntounias	Men's 67 kg	—N/a				Bye	Benfredj (ALG); L PO (2–8)	—N/a	Bye	Zeneli (ALB); L PO (8–9)	5
Arionas Kolitsopoulos	Men's 77 kg	—N/a				Chekly (MAR); W ST (9–0)	Sánchez-Silva (ESP); W PP (6–1)	Kamenjašević (CRO); L PP (1–5)	Bye	Dariozzi (ITA); L PP (1–5)	5
Ilias Pagkalidis	Men's 87 kg	—N/a				Bye	Kaya (TUR); L PP (1–5)	Did not advance			
Laokratis Kesidis	Men's 97 kg	Kayışdağ (TUR); W PP (3–3)	Komarov (SRB); L PP (3–4)	Samen (FRA); W VT (3–0)	2	—N/a		Kakhelashvili (ITA); L PP (2–5)	—N/a	Rouabah (ALG); L PP (1–6)	4

Freestyle

Athlete	Event	Group Stage					Round of 16	Quarterfinal	Semifinal	Repechage	Final / BM	
Athlete	Event	Opposition Result	Opposition Result	Opposition Result	Opposition Result	Rank	Opposition Result	Opposition Result	Opposition Result	Opposition Result	Opposition Result	Rank
Georgios Ioakeimidis	Men's 74 kg	—N/a					Bye	Dudaev (ALB); L SP (0-10)	Did not advance	Xhoni (KOS); W SP (13-2)	Mottaghinia Mottaghinia (ESP); L SP (0-10)	4
Georgios Kougioumtsidis	Men's 86 kg	—N/a					Bye	Magomedov (MKD); W SP (10-0)	Niccolini (ITA); W SP (10-0)	Bye	Kucuksolak (TUR); W PO (8-0)	1st place, gold medalist(s)
Dauren Kurugliev	Men's 97 kg	Hajdari (MKD); W SP (10-0)	Cheikh Lahlou (MAR); W SP (10-0)	—N/a		1 Q	—N/a		Gune (TUR); W SP (13-2)	Bye	Hajdari (MKD); W PO (6-0)	1st place, gold medalist(s)
Azamat Khosonov	Men's 125 kg	Nurov (MKD); W PP (6-2)	Karepi (ALB); W PP (5-1)	Conyedo Ruano (ITA); W PP (3-1)	—N/a	1 Q	—N/a		Sheyata (EGY); L PP (2-4)	Bye	Conyedo Ruano (ITA); W PO (3-1)	3rd place, bronze medalist(s)
Maria Gkika	Women's 50 kg	—N/a					Bye	Doudou (ALG); W PO (4-0)	Ahmed (EGY); W SP (10-0)	Bye	Demirhan (TUR); L PP 1-7	2nd place, silver medalist(s)
Maria Prevolaraki	Women's 53 kg	—N/a						Yetgil Kamal (TUR); L VF (0-0)	Did not advance			
Nikoleta Barmpa	Women's 68 kg	—N/a					Lecarpentier (FRA); L PP (1-4)	Did not advance				
Eleni Chrysikaki	Women's 76 kg	Dacher (FRA); L VT (0-4)	Hamza (EGY); L PP (1-10)	—N/a		3	—N/a		Did not advance			
