= Swimming at the 2026 Mediterranean Games – Men's 200 metre freestyle =

Men's 200 metre freestyle at the 2026 Mediterranean Games
- Location: Taranto, Italy
- Dates: 23 August
- Competitors: 19 from 11 nations
- Winning time: 1:47.53

Medalists
gold medal	Jacopo Barbotti	Italy
silver medal	Ahmet Mete Boylu	Turkey
bronze medal	Dimitrios Markos	Greece

The Men's 200 metre freestyle competition at the 2026 Mediterranean Games was held on 23 August 2026 at the Torre d'Ayala Swimming Stadium in Taranto.

== Records ==
Prior to this competition, the existing world and Mediterranean Games records were as follows:

World record	Paul Biedermann (GER)	1:42.00	Rome, Italy	28 July 2009
Mediterranean Games record	Oussama Mellouli (TUN)	1:46.44	Pescara, Italy	30 June 2009

== Results ==
=== Heats ===
The heats were started at 10:35.

Rank	Heat	Lane	Name	Nationality	Time	Notes
1	3	2	Jovan Lekić	Bosnia and Herzegovina	1:49.13	q
2	3	4	Ahmet Mete Boylu	Turkey	1:49.19	q
3	1	3	Saso Boskan	Slovenia	1:49.58	q
4	2	5	Jacopo Barbotti	Italy	1:49.93	q
5	1	4	Dimitrios Markos	Greece	1:50.07	q
6	3	3	Kenan Dračić	Bosnia and Herzegovina	1:50.13	q
7	2	4	Velimir Stjepanović	Serbia	1:50.15	q
8	1	5	Marco De Tullio	Italy	1:50.54	q
=9	1	6	Mohamed Yassin Ben Abbes	Tunisia	1:50.69	R?
=9	2	6	Alberto Hernández García	Spain	1:50.69	R?
11	2	2	Iason Routoulas	Greece	1:51.03	
12	2	3	Ian Florencio Fernández	Spain	1:51.18	
13	3	7	Emre Onuş	Turkey	1:51.19	
14	3	5	Niko Janković	Croatia	1:51.24	
15	2	7	Fares Benzidoun	Algeria	1:51.47	
16	1	2	Jaka Pusnik	Slovenia	1:52.15	
17	3	6	Karlo Perčinić	Croatia	1:52.17	
18	3	1	Ognen Slavkovski	North Macedonia	1:56.28	
	1	7	Nikola Ǵuretanoviḱ	North Macedonia	Did not start	

=== Swim-off ===
The swim-off was held at 12:15.

Rank	Lane	Name	Nationality	Time	Notes
1	5	Mohamed Yassin Ben Abbes	Tunisia	1:50.59	R1
2	4	Alberto Hernández García	Spain	1:50.86	R2

== Final ==
The final was held at 18:31.

Rank	Lane	Name	Nationality	Time	Notes
1	6	Jacopo Barbotti	Italy	1:47.53	
2	5	Ahmet Mete Boylu	Turkey	1:47.59	
3	2	Dimitrios Markos	Greece	1:47.92	
4	7	Kenan Dračić	Bosnia and Herzegovina	1:48.90	
5	3	Saso Boskan	Slovenia	1:49.04	
6	4	Jovan Lekić	Bosnia and Herzegovina	1:49.39	
7	1	Velimir Stjepanović	Serbia	1:49.66	
8	8	Mohamed Yassin Ben Abbes	Tunisia	1:50.33	
