= Karate at the 2026 Mediterranean Games =

Karate competition

- Venue: PalaWojtyla
- Dates: 1–2 September
- Competitors: 144 from 22 nations

Karate at the 2026 Mediterranean Games was held at the PalaWojtyla from 1 to 2 September.

== Medal table ==
* Host nation (Italy)

Rank	Nation	Gold	Silver	Bronze	Total
1	Egypt	3	0	2	5
2	Morocco	2	0	3	5
3	Algeria	1	0	2	3
4	France	1	0	1	2
5	Kosovo	1	0	0	1
5	North Macedonia	1	0	0	1
5	Portugal	1	0	0	1
8	Italy*	0	3	3	6
8	Turkey	0	3	3	6
10	Croatia	0	2	1	3
11	Montenegro	0	1	1	2
12	Libya	0	1	0	1
13	Bosnia and Herzegovina	0	0	2	2
14	Cyprus	0	0	1	1
14	Greece	0	0	1	1
Totals (15 entries)		10	10	20	40

== Medalists ==
=== Men ===
Event	Gold	Silver	Bronze
Kumite –60 kg	Islam Selmani; Kosovo	Burak Özdemir; Turkey	Balša Vojinović; Montenegro Christos-Stefanos Xenos; Greece
Kumite –67 kg	Matej Belistojanoski; North Macedonia	Boran Berak; Croatia	Luca Maresca; Italy Said Oubaya; Morocco
Kumite –75 kg	Kilian Cizo; France	Ömer Faruk Yürür; Turkey	Daniele De Vivo; Italy Hamza Sam; Morocco
Kumite –84 kg	Mehdi Sriti; Morocco	Mohamed Abudabous; Libya	Youssef Badawy; Egypt Falleh Midoune; Algeria
Kumite +84 kg	Tarek Taha Mahmoud; Egypt	Anđelo Kvesić; Croatia	Uğur Aktaş; Turkey Hocine Daikhi; Algeria

=== Women ===
Event	Gold	Silver	Bronze
Kumite –50 kg	Cylia Ouikene; Algeria	Erminia Perfetto; Italy	Reem Salama; Egypt Ema Sgardelli; Croatia
Kumite –55 kg	Chaimae El Hayti; Morocco	Veronica Brunori; Italy	Silya Abdesselem; France Nejra Sipović; Bosnia and Herzegovina
Kumite –61 kg	Rahma Tolba; Egypt	Fatma Naz Yenen; Turkey	Sawsane Benchbab; Morocco Alessandra Mangiacapra; Italy
Kumite –68 kg	Feryal Abdelaziz; Egypt	Silvia Semeraro; Italy	Eda Eltemur; Turkey Amina Fejzić; Bosnia and Herzegovina
Kumite +68 kg	Ana Rita Oliveira; Portugal	Jovana Damjanović; Montenegro	Fatma Çekiç; Turkey Theodosia Giamouki; Cyprus
