= Shooting at the 2026 Mediterranean Games =

- Venue: Palazzetto Albano, Torricella
- Dates: 22–31 August

Shooting competitions at the 2026 Mediterranean Games will be held from 22 to 31 August 2026 at the Palazzetto Albano, in Torricella.

== Medal summary ==
=== Men's events ===
Event	Gold	Silver	Bronze
Pistol	İsmail Keleş; Turkey	Antoine Naucodie; France	Buğra Selimzade; Turkey
Rifle	Danilo Sollazzo; Italy	Miran Maričić; Croatia	Angelos Sarantakis; Greece
Skeet	Samer Sarkis; Lebanon	Muhammet Seyhun Kaya; Turkey	Nicolas Vasiliou; Cyprus
Trap	Andrés García; Spain	Ioannis Chatzitsakiroglou; Greece	Emanuele Buccolieri; Italy

=== Women's events ===
Event	Gold	Silver	Bronze
Pistol	Zorana Arunović; Serbia	Margherita Brigida Veccaro; Italy	Şevval İlayda Tarhan; Turkey
Rifle	Zakira Pušina; Bosnia and Herzegovina	Anđelija Stevanović; Serbia	Aleksandra Stojadinović; Serbia
Skeet	Sara Bongini; Italy	Çiğdem Özyaman; Turkey	Konstantia Nikolaou; Cyprus
Trap	Safiye Sarıtürk Temizdemir; Turkey	Erica Sessa; Italy	Alessandra Perilli; San Marino

=== Mixed events ===
Event	Gold	Silver	Bronze
Pistol team	Turkey; İsmail Keleş; Şimal Yılmaz	Turkey; Buğra Selimzade; Şevval İlayda Tarhan	Serbia; Zorana Arunović; Damir Mikec
Rifle team	Serbia; Aleksa Rakonjac; Anđelija Stevanović	Italy; Carlotta Salafia; Danilo Sollazzo	Turkey; Mert Nalbant; Damla Köse
Trap team	Turkey; Yavuz İlnam; Safiye Sarıtürk Temizdemir	Spain; Andrés García; Mar Molné	Italy; Silvana Stanco; Mauro De Filippis

=== Medal table ===
* Host nation (Italy)

Rank	Nation	Gold	Silver	Bronze	Total
1	Turkey	4	3	3	10
2	Italy*	2	3	2	7
3	Serbia	2	1	2	5
4	Spain	1	1	0	2
5	Bosnia and Herzegovina	1	0	0	1
5	Lebanon	1	0	0	1
7	Greece	0	1	1	2
8	Croatia	0	1	0	1
8	France	0	1	0	1
10	Cyprus	0	0	2	2
11	San Marino	0	0	1	1
Totals (11 entries)		11	11	11	33
