= Finswimming at the 2026 Mediterranean Games =

- Venue: Stadio del Nuoto Torre d'Ayala, Taranto
- Dates: 26–27 August

The finswimming competitions at the 2026 Mediterranean Games were held from 26 to 27 August at the Stadio del Nuoto Torre d'Ayala, Taranto.

== Medal events ==
=== Men's events ===
Event	Gold		Silver		Bronze	
50 m apnea	Tarek Hassan; Egypt	14.41; MR	Angelos Korompylis; Greece	14.60	Derin Atman; Turkey	14.84
100 m surface	Tarek Hassan; Egypt	34.44	Angelos Korompylis; Greece	35.31	Filip Strikinac; Croatia	35.82
200 m surface	Lorenzo Caronno; Italy	1:22.33; MR	Ahmed Mohamed Awad; Egypt	1:23.55	Mohab Nasreldin; Egypt	1:24.07
400 m surface	Mohab Nasreldin; Egypt	3:01.17	Lorenzo Caronno; Italy	3:04.14	Antonin Lebeau; France	3:05.20
50 m bi-fins	Ioannis Ioakeimidis; Greece	18.88; MR	Filippo Pavoni; Italy	18.89	Miguel Trotsenko; Spain	19.25
100 m bi-fins	Filippo Pavoni; Italy	42.06; MR	Emre Gürdenli; Turkey	42.71	Ahmed Hesham Radwan; Egypt	42.84
200 m bi-fins	Ahmed Radwan; Egypt	1:36.03	Riccardo Porciani; Italy	1:36.58	Kaan Efe Kaya; Turkey	1:36.63
400 m bi-fins	Kaan Efe Kaya; Turkey	3:30.20	Kévin Lasserre; France	3:33.68	Paolo De Pasquale; Italy Valter Prampolini; Italy	3:35.70

=== Women's events ===
Event	Gold		Silver		Bronze	
50 m apnea	Ifigeneia Teliousi; Greece	16.60	Mariam Hegab; Egypt	16.61	Lola Guille; France	16.80
100 m surface	Maria Iliaki; Greece	40.01; MR	Giulia Bruni; Italy	40.33	Dora Bassi; Croatia	40.60
200 m surface	Ifigeneia Teliousi; Greece	1:31.42; MR	Anna Leonardi; Italy	1:31.57	Anaïs Verger; France	1:32.46
400 m surface	Anaïs Verger; France	3:19.73; MR	Nada Hagrass; Egypt	3:21.19	Anna Filoglou; Greece	3:22.20
50 m bi-fins	Viola Magoga; Italy	21.91; MR	Salma Raslan; Egypt	22.17	Ioanna Tsalouchou; Greece	22.70
100 m bi-fins	Viola Magoga; Italy	48.18; MR	Emna Ben Hsouna; Tunisia	48.72	Camille Julien; France	48.91
200 m bi-fins	Camille Julien; France	1:45.63; MR	Elettra Calanca; Italy	1:48.19	Albane Déage; France	1:48.21
400 m bi-fins	Elettra Calanca; Italy	3:51.50	Laura Franchin; Italy	3:53.17	Albane Déage; France	3:53.69

=== Mixed events ===
Event	Gold		Silver		Bronze	
4x50 m bi-fins relay	Italy (ITA); Filippo Pavoni (18.84); Giulia Bruni (21.23); Marco Orsi (18.58); Viola Magoga (21.09)	1:19.74; MR	France (FRA); Charles Salsano (19.76); Marine Spelliers (21.99); Marin Debril (19.03); Camille Julien (22.10)	1:12.88	Egypt (EGY); Seif Khaled (19.51); Salma Rabea (21.50); Ahmed Hesham Radwan (19.47); Mariam Hegab (22.15 )	1:23.03
4x100 m surface relay	Greece (GRE); Georgios Kaltsoukalas (36.87); Maria Iliaki (39.88); Angelos Korompylis (34.93); Ifigeneia Teliousi (40.18)	2:31.86	Italy (ITA); Fabio Biancalana (36.64); Anna Raffaetà (41.03); Leonardo Spelta (36.81); Giulia Bruni (39.66)	2:34.14	Egypt (EGY); Tarek Hassan (34.92); Renad Tamer (42.12); Yassin Ahmed (36.28); Mariam Hegab (41.45)	2:34.77

== Medal table ==
* Host nation (Italy)

Rank	Nation	Gold	Silver	Bronze	Total
1	Italy*	6	8	2	16
2	Greece	5	2	2	9
3	Egypt	4	4	4	12
4	France	2	2	6	10
5	Turkey	1	1	2	4
6	Tunisia	0	1	0	1
7	Croatia	0	0	2	2
8	Spain	0	0	1	1
Totals (8 entries)		18	18	19	55
