= Wrestling at the 2026 Mediterranean Games – Women's freestyle 76 kg =

Wrestling competitions

Women's freestyle 76 kg at the 2026 Mediterranean Games
- Venue: PalaWojtyla
- Date: 24–25 August
- Competitors: 6 from 6 nations

Medalists
gold medal	Samar Amer	Egypt
silver medal	Kadriye Aksoy Koçak	Turkey
bronze medal	Enrica Rinaldi	Italy

The Women's freestyle 76 kg competition of the wrestling events at the 2026 Mediterranean Games in Martina Franca, Italy, was held from 24 to 25 August at the PalaWojtyla.

== Results ==
=== Elimination groups ===
==== Group A ====
Pos	Athlete	Pld	W	L	CP	TP
1	Samar Amer (EGY)	2	2	0	6	16
2	Kendra Dacher (FRA)	2	1	1	5	4
3	Eleni Chrysikaki (GRE)	2	0	2	1	1

Source: Taranto 2026

	Score		CP
Kendra Dacher (FRA)	4–0 Fall	Eleni Chrysikaki (GRE)	5–0 VFA
Samar Amer (EGY)	6–0	Kendra Dacher (FRA)	3–0 VPO1
Eleni Chrysikaki (GRE)	1–10	Samar Amer (EGY)	1–3 VPO1

==== Group B ====
Pos	Athlete	Pld	W	L	CP	TP
1	Kadriye Aksoy Koçak (TUR)	2	2	0	8	7
2	Enrica Rinaldi (ITA)	2	1	1	6	5
3	Yasmine Bouregba (ALG)	2	0	2	0	1

Source: Taranto 2026

	Score		CP
Enrica Rinaldi (ITA)	2–3	Kadriye Aksoy Koçak (TUR)	1–3 VPO1
Kadriye Aksoy Koçak (TUR)	4–0 Fall	Yasmine Bouregba (ALG)	5–0 VFA
Yasmine Bouregba (ALG)	1–3 Fall	Enrica Rinaldi (ITA)	0–5 VFA

=== Knockout round ===
Semifinals
Samar Amer (EGY)	4
Enrica Rinaldi (ITA)	1
Kadriye Aksoy Koçak (TUR)	11
Kendra Dacher (FRA)	0

Final
Samar Amer (EGY)	5
Kadriye Aksoy Koçak (TUR)	3
Bronze medal
Enrica Rinaldi (ITA)	7
Kendra Dacher (FRA)	0
