= Wrestling at the 2026 Mediterranean Games – Men's freestyle 74 kg =

Wrestling competitions

Men's Freestyle 74 kg at the 2026 Mediterranean Games
- Venue: PalaWojtyla
- Date: 23–24 August
- Competitors: 12 from 12 nations

Medalists
gold medal	Islam Dudaev	Albania
silver medal	Fati Vejseli	North Macedonia
bronze medal	Yasin Yeşil	Turkey
bronze medal	Mohammad Mottaghinia	Spain

The Men's Freestyle 74 kg competition of the wrestling events at the 2026 Mediterranean Games in Martina Franca, Italy, was held from 23 to 24 August at the PalaWojtyla.

== Results ==
Legend

- F — Won by fall

Round of 16
Khairiddine Ben Tlili (TUN)	3
Fati Vejseli (MKD)	6
Yasin Yeşil (TUR)	10^{F}
Majd Aisha (SYR)	0
Mohammad Mottaghinia (ESP)	11
Luca Finizio (ITA)	0
Islam Dudaev (ALB)	11^{F}
Egzon Xhoni (KOS)	2

Quarterfinals
Omar Mourad (EGY)	1
Fati Vejseli (MKD)	4
Yasin Yeşil (TUR)	9
Abdelkader Ikkal (ALG)	4
Nico Zaeb (MLT)	0
Mohammad Mottaghinia (ESP)	10
Islam Dudaev (ALB)	10
Georgios Ioakeimidis (GRE)	0

Semifinals
Fati Vejseli (MKD)	5
Yasin Yeşil (TUR)	3
Mohammad Mottaghinia (ESP)	1
Islam Dudaev (ALB)	3

Final
Fati Vejseli (MKD)	0^{R}
Islam Dudaev (ALB)	4

Repechage
Khairiddine Ben Tlili (TUN)	0
Omar Mourad (EGY)	10
Egzon Xhoni (KOS)	2
Georgios Ioakeimidis (GRE)	13

Bronze medals
Omar Mourad (EGY)	3
Yasin Yeşil (TUR)	13
Georgios Ioakeimidis (GRE)	0
Mohammad Mottaghinia (ESP)	10
