= Wrestling at the 2026 Mediterranean Games – Men's freestyle 125 kg =

Wrestling competitions

Men's Freestyle 125 kg at the 2026 Mediterranean Games
- Venue: PalaWojtyla
- Date: 23–24 August
- Competitors: 7 from 7 nations

Medalists
gold medal	Hakan Büyükçıngıl	Turkey
silver medal	Abdelrahman Sheyata	Egypt
bronze medal	Azamat Khosonov	Greece

The Men's Freestyle 125 kg competition of the wrestling events at the 2026 Mediterranean Games in Martina Franca, Italy, was held from 23 to 24 August at the PalaWojtyla.

== Results ==
=== Elimination groups ===
==== Group A ====
Pos	Athlete	Pld	W	L	CP	TP
1	Azamat Khosonov (GRE)	3	3	0	9	14
2	Abraham Conyedo (ITA)	3	1	2	5	7
3	Magomedgaji Nurov (MKD)	3	1	2	4	9
4	Paris Karepi (ALB)	3	1	2	4	6

Source: Taranto 2026

	Score		CP
Abraham Conyedo (ITA)	4–0	Paris Karepi (ALB)	3–0 VPO
Magomedgaji Nurov (MKD)	2–6	Azamat Khosonov (GRE)	1–3 VPO1
Abraham Conyedo (ITA)	2–7	Magomedgaji Nurov (MKD)	1–3 VPO1
Paris Karepi (ALB)	1–5	Azamat Khosonov (GRE)	1–3 VPO1
Abraham Conyedo (ITA)	1–3	Azamat Khosonov (GRE)	1–3 VPO1
Paris Karepi (ALB)	5–0	Magomedgaji Nurov (MKD)	3–0 VPO

==== Group B ====
Pos	Athlete	Pld	W	L	CP	TP
1	Hakan Büyükçıngıl (TUR)	2	2	0	7	20
2	Abdelrahman Sheyata (EGY)	2	1	1	6	13
3	Laid Khelif (ALG)	2	0	2	0	2

Source: Taranto 2026

	Score		CP
Laid Khelif (ALG)	2–8 Fall	Abdelrahman Sheyata (EGY)	0–5 VFA
Hakan Büyükçıngıl (TUR)	10–0	Laid Khelif (ALG)	4–0 VSU
Abdelrahman Sheyata (EGY)	5–10	Hakan Büyükçıngıl (TUR)	1–3 VPO1

=== Knockout round ===
Semifinals
Abdelrahman Sheyata (EGY)	4
Azamat Khosonov (GRE)	2
Hakan Büyükçıngıl (TUR)	5
Abraham Conyedo (ITA)	1

Final
Abdelrahman Sheyata (EGY)	3
Hakan Büyükçıngıl (TUR)	4
Bronze medal
Azamat Khosonov (GRE)	3
Abraham Conyedo (ITA)	1
