= Wrestling at the 2026 Mediterranean Games – Men's freestyle 97 kg =

Wrestling competitions

Men's Freestyle 97 kg at the 2026 Mediterranean Games
- Venue: PalaWojtyla
- Date: 23–24 August
- Competitors: 7 from 7 nations

Medalists
gold medal	Dauren Kurugliev	Greece
silver medal	Redjep Hajdari	North Macedonia
bronze medal	Resul Güne	Turkey

The men's freestyle 97 kg competition at the 2026 Mediterranean Games in Martina Franca, Italy, was held from 23 to 24 August at the PalaWojtyla.

== Results ==
=== Elimination groups ===
==== Group A ====
Pos	Athlete	Pld	W	L	CP	TP
1	Adlan Viskhanov (FRA)	3	3	0	12	25
2	Resul Güne (TUR)	3	2	1	10	32
3	Ben Honis (ITA)	3	1	2	5	9
4	Mohamed Salahel (EGY)	3	0	3	2	6

Source: Taranto 2026

	Score		CP
Adlan Viskhanov (FRA)	12–8	Resul Güne (TUR)}	3–1 VPO1
Mohamed Salahel (EGY)	2–6 Fall	Ben Honis (ITA)	0–5 VFA
Mohamed Salahel (EGY)	2–13	Adlan Viskhanov (FRA)	1–4 VSU1
Ben Honis (ITA)	3–10	Resul Güne (TUR)	0–5 VIN
Mohamed Salahel (EGY)	2–14	Resul Güne (TUR)	1–4 VSU1
Ben Honis (ITA)	0–0	Adlan Viskhanov (FRA)	0–5 VIN

==== Group B ====
Pos	Athlete	Pld	W	L	CP	TP
1	Dauren Kurugliev (GRE)	2	2	0	8	20
2	Redjep Hajdari (MKD)	2	1	1	4	11
3	Walid Cheikh Lahlou (MAR)	2	0	2	0	0

Source: Taranto 2026

	Score		CP
Redjep Hajdari (MKD)	0–10	Dauren Kurugliev (GRE)	0–4 VSU
Walid Cheikh Lahlou (MAR)	0–11	Redjep Hajdari (MKD)	0–4 VSU
Dauren Kurugliev (GRE)	10–0	Walid Cheikh Lahlou (MAR)	4–0 VSU

=== Knockout round ===
Semifinals
Adlan Viskhanov (FRA)	2
Redjep Hajdari (MKD)	3
Dauren Kurugliev (GRE)	13
Resul Güne (TUR)	2

Final
Redjep Hajdari (MKD)	0
Dauren Kurugliev (GRE)	6
Bronze medal
Adlan Viskhanov (FRA)	7
Resul Güne (TUR)	7
