= Wrestling at the 2026 Mediterranean Games – Men's Greco-Roman 77 kg =

Wrestling competitions

Men's Greco-Roman 77 kg at the 2026 Mediterranean Games
- Venue: PalaWojtyla
- Date: 22–23 August
- Competitors: 14 from 14 nations

Medalists
gold medal	Yunus Emre Başar	Turkey
silver medal	Antonio Kamenjašević	Croatia
bronze medal	Luca Dariozzi	Italy
bronze medal	Moustafa Alameldin	Egypt

The Men's Greco-Roman 77 kg competition of the wrestling events at the 2026 Mediterranean Games in Martina Franca, Italy, was held from 22 to 23 August at the PalaWojtyla.

== Results ==
Legend

- F — Won by fall

Round of 16
Antonio Kamenjašević (CRO)	9
Radhwen Tarhouni (TUN)	0
João Simões (POR)	0
Arionas Kolitsopoulos (GRE)	9
Yassine Chekly (MAR)	0
Marcos Sánchez-Silva (ESP)	5
Chawki Doulache (ALG)	8
Mohamad Al-Obeid (SYR)	0
Yunus Emre Başar (TUR)	5
Kevin Kupi (ALB)	0
Moustafa Alameldin (EGY)	3
Ali Arsalan (SRB)	0

Quarterfinals
Luca Dariozzi (ITA)	1
Antonio Kamenjašević (CRO)	3
Arionas Kolitsopoulos (GRE)	6
Marcos Sánchez-Silva (ESP)	1
Chawki Doulache (ALG)	2
Yunus Emre Başar (TUR)	7
Moustafa Alameldin (EGY)	7
Ibrahim Ghanem (FRA)	7

Semifinals
Antonio Kamenjašević (CRO)	5
Arionas Kolitsopoulos (GRE)	1
Yunus Emre Başar (TUR)	6
Moustafa Alameldin (EGY)	4

Final
Antonio Kamenjašević (CRO)	1
Yunus Emre Başar (TUR)	2

Repechage
Radhwen Tarhouni (TUN)	3
Luca Dariozzi (ITA)	11
Kevin Kupi (ALB)	4
Chawki Doulache (ALG)	3

Bronze medals
Luca Dariozzi (ITA)	5
Arionas Kolitsopoulos (GRE)	1
Kevin Kupi (ALB)	2
Moustafa Alameldin (EGY)	10
