= Wrestling at the 2026 Mediterranean Games – Women's freestyle 50 kg =

Wrestling competitions

Women's freestyle 50 kg at the 2026 Mediterranean Games
- Venue: PalaWojtyla
- Date: 24–25 August
- Competitors: 9 from 9 nations

Medalists
gold medal	Zehra Demirhan	Turkey
silver medal	Maria Gkika	Greece
bronze medal	Emanuela Liuzzi	Italy
bronze medal	Ibtissem Doudou	Algeria

The Women's Freestyle 50 kg competition of the wrestling events at the 2026 Mediterranean Games in Martina Franca, Italy, was held from 24 to 25 August at the PalaWojtyla.

== Results ==
Legend

- F — Won by fall
- R — Retired

Round of 16
Zehra Demirhan (TUR)	4
Emanuela Liuzzi (ITA)	2

Quarterfinals
Chahrazed Ayachi (TUN)	0
Zehra Demirhan (TUR)	12
Lonisa Reka (KOS)	0
Joséphine Haemmerle (FRA)	5^{F}
Ibtissem Doudou (ALG)	0
Maria Gkika (GRE)	4
Malak Ahmed (EGY)	7
Aintzane Gorria (ESP)	6

Semifinals
Zehra Demirhan (TUR)	10^{F}
Joséphine Haemmerle (FRA)	0
Maria Gkika (GRE)	10
Malak Ahmed (EGY)	0

Final
Zehra Demirhan (TUR)	7
Maria Gkika (GRE)	1

Repechage
Emanuela Liuzzi (ITA)	5
Chahrazed Ayachi (TUN)	0

Bronze medals
Emanuela Liuzzi (ITA)	0
Joséphine Haemmerle (FRA)	0^{R}
Ibtissem Doudou (ALG)	3
Malak Ahmed (EGY)	2
