= Swimming at the 2026 Mediterranean Games – Women's 200 metre backstroke =

Women's 200 metre backstroke at the 2026 Mediterranean Games
- Location: Taranto, Italy
- Dates: 22 August
- Competitors: 9 from 7 nations
- Winning time: 2:08.88

Medalists
gold medal	Camila Rebelo	Portugal
silver medal	Federica Toma	Italy
bronze medal	Sudem Denizli	Turkey

The women's 200 metre backstroke competition at the 2026 Mediterranean Games was held on 22 August at the Torre d'Ayala Swimming Stadium in Taranto.

== Records ==
Prior to this competition, the existing world and Mediterranean Games records were as follows:

World record	Kaylee McKeown (AUS)	2:03.14	Sydney, Australia	10 March 2023
Mediterranean Games record	Alessia Filippi (ITA)	2:08.03	Pescara, Italy	28 June 2009

== Results ==
=== Heats ===
Heats were started at 10:45.

Rank	Heat	Lane	Name	Nationality	Time	Notes
1	1	3	Paula González Miralles	Spain	2:15.86	q
2	1	5	Federica Toma	Italy	2:16.71	q
3	2	3	Sudem Denizli	Turkey	2:16.83	q
4	2	4	Camila Rebelo	Portugal	2:17.00	q
5	2	5	Nahia Garrido Malvar	Spain	2:17.17	q
6	2	6	Eleni Antoniadou	Greece	2:17.40	q
7	1	4	Alessia Bianchi	Italy	2:19.02	q
8	1	6	Margherita Gregoroni	San Marino	2:24.43	q
9	2	2	Erina Idrizaj	Kosovo	2:27.38	

=== Final ===
Final will be held at 18:32.

Rank	Lane	Name	Nationality	Time	Notes
1st place, gold medalist(s)	6	Camila Rebelo	Portugal	2:08.88	
2nd place, silver medalist(s)	5	Federica Toma	Italy	2:11.62	
3rd place, bronze medalist(s)	3	Sudem Denizli	Turkey	2:13.13	
4	4	Paula González Miralles	Spain	2:14.48	
5	7	Eleni Antoniadou	Greece	2:14.86	
6	2	Nahia Garrido Malvar	Spain	2:15.24	
7	1	Alessia Bianchi	Italy	2:16.39	
8	8	Margherita Gregoroni	San Marino	2:22.25	
