= Rowing at the 2026 Mediterranean Games =

- Venue: Parco Cimino – Mar Piccolo
- Dates: 31 August – 2 September

The rowing competitions was held from 31 August to 2 September at the Parco Cimino – Mar Piccolo in Taranto.

Athletes competed in 10 events.

== Medal summary ==
=== Men's events ===
Event	Gold		Silver		Bronze	
M1x	Stefanos Ntouskos; Greece	7:14.17	Enver Erman; Turkey	7:18.87	Mikel Mardaras; Spain	7:19.48
M2x	Serbia; Martin Mačković; Nikolaj Pimenov	6:25.37	Italy; Josef Giorgio Marvucic; Marco Prati	6:28.57	Greece; Nikolaos Cholopoulos; Kōstantinos Giannoulīs	6:32.92
LM1x	Petros Gkaidatzis; Greece	7:25.09	Ahmet Ali Kabadayı; Turkey	7:27.43	Luca Borgonovo; Italy	7:29.40
LM2x	Italy; Tito Christoforakis; Giovanni Borgonovo	6:31.53	Greece; Paris-Rafail Kotsias; Angelos Athanasiadis-Kaoudis	6:33.44	France; Leo Desmolles; Frederic Ludwig	6:34.26

=== Women's events ===
Event	Gold		Silver		Bronze	
W1x	Evangelia Anastasiadou; Greece	7:32.30	Jovana Arsić; Serbia	8:03.87	Nina Kostanjšek; Slovenia	8:07.42
W2x	Greece; Christina Bourmpou; Eleni Diavati	7:10.86	Turkey; Derin Kumuk; Elis Özbay	7:19.67	Italy; Aurora Spirito; Sara Borghi	7:23.79
LW1x	Zoi Fitsiou; Greece	8:11.67	Nihed Benchadli; Algeria	8:26.89	Inês Leite de Oliveira; Portugal	8:31.03
LW2x	Italy; Elena Sali; Melissa Schincarol	7:12.02	Greece; Paschalina Mouratidou; Gavriela Lioliou	7:15.74	Tunisia; Khadija Krimi; Selma Dhaouadi	7:21.69

=== Mixed events ===
Event	Gold		Silver		Bronze	
Mix2x	Greece; Stefanos Ntouskos; Evangelia Anastasiadou	6:55.98	Croatia; Goran Mahmutović; Josipa Jurković	7:03.22	Italy; Leonardo Tedoldi; Irene Gattiglia	7:08.14
LMix2x	Greece; Petros Gkaidatzis; Zoi Fitsiou	7:04.14	Italy; Niccolò Gandola; Elena Sali	7:08.67	Tunisia; Mohamed Krimi; Khadija Krimi	7:10.25

== Medal table ==
* Host nation (Italy)

Rank	Nation	Gold	Silver	Bronze	Total
1	Greece	7	2	1	10
2	Italy*	2	2	3	7
3	Serbia	1	1	0	2
4	Turkey	0	3	0	3
5	Algeria	0	1	0	1
5	Croatia	0	1	0	1
7	Tunisia	0	0	2	2
8	France	0	0	1	1
8	Portugal	0	0	1	1
8	Slovenia	0	0	1	1
8	Spain	0	0	1	1
Totals (11 entries)		10	10	10	30
