= 2025 U23 World Wrestling Championships – Women's freestyle 53 kg =

Wrestling competitions

Women's freestyle 53 kg at the 2025 U23 World Championships
- Venue: SPC Vojvodina
- Dates: 24–25 October
- Competitors: 19 from 17 nations

Medalists
gold medal	Haruna Morikawa	Japan
silver medal	Hansika Lamba	India
bronze medal	Christianah Ogunsanya	Nigeria
bronze medal	Carla Jaume	Spain

The women's freestyle 53 kilograms is a competition featured at the 2025 U23 World Wrestling Championships, and was held in Novi Sad, Serbia on 24 and 25 October 2025.

This freestyle wrestling competition consists of a single-elimination tournament, with a repechage used to determine the winner of two bronze medals. The two finalists face off for gold and silver medals. Each wrestler who loses to one of the two finalists moves into the repechage, culminating in a pair of bronze medal matches featuring the semifinal losers each facing the remaining repechage opponent from their half of the bracket.

== Results ==
Legend

- F — Won by fall

=== Final ===
Final
Haruna Morikawa (JPN)	4
Hansika Lamba (IND)	0

=== Top half ===
Round of 32
Ekaterina Karpushkina (UWW)	0
Christianah Ogunsanya (NGR)	10

Round of 16
Maria Ferone (ITA)	0
Chen Suiyi (CHN)	10
Christianah Ogunsanya (NGR)	9
Serena Di Benedetto (CAN)	0
Vestina Danisevičiūtė (LTU)	0
Brianna Gonzalez (USA)	9^{F}
Nataliia Klivchutska (UKR)	0
Haruna Morikawa (JPN)	9^{F}

Quarterfinals
Chen Suiyi (CHN)	6
Christianah Ogunsanya (NGR)	10
Brianna Gonzalez (USA)	0
Haruna Morikawa (JPN)	6

Semifinals
Christianah Ogunsanya (NGR)	2
Haruna Morikawa (JPN)	5

=== Bottom half ===
Round of 32
Hansika Lamba (IND)	11
Viktoriya Volk (UWW)	0
Alexa Álvarez (VEN)	6
Carla Jaume (ESP)	8

Round of 16
Milana Mitrović (SRB)	0
Dilshoda Matnazarova (UZB)	10
Hansika Lamba (IND)	8
Zeinep Bayanova (KAZ)	2
Antonia Valdés (CHI)	0
Carla Jaume (ESP)	10
Elnura Mammadova (AZE)	9
Sıla Aykul (TUR)	0

Quarterfinals
Dilshoda Matnazarova (UZB)	0
Hansika Lamba (IND)	10
Carla Jaume (ESP)	14
Elnura Mammadova (AZE)	11

Semifinals
Hansika Lamba (IND)	11
Carla Jaume (ESP)	0

=== Repechage ===
Repechage round 1
Viktoriya Volk (UWW)	9
Zeinep Bayanova (KAZ)	8

Repechage round 2
Nataliia Klivchutska (UKR)	1
Brianna Gonzalez (USA)	2
Viktoriya Volk (UWW)	7
Dilshoda Matnazarova (UZB)	5

Bronze medals
Brianna Gonzalez (USA)	0
Christianah Ogunsanya (NGR)	8
Viktoriya Volk (UWW)	2
Carla Jaume (ESP)	5

== Final standing ==
Rank	Athlete
1st place, gold medalist(s)	Haruna Morikawa (JPN)
2nd place, silver medalist(s)	Hansika Lamba (IND)
3rd place, bronze medalist(s)	Christianah Ogunsanya (NGR)
3rd place, bronze medalist(s)	Carla Jaume (ESP)
5	Brianna Gonzalez (USA)
5	Viktoriya Volk (UWW)
7	Chen Suiyi (CHN)
8	Dilshoda Matnazarova (UZB)
9	Elnura Mammadova (AZE)
10	Zeinep Bayanova (KAZ)
11	Alexa Álvarez (VEN)
12	Nataliia Klivchutska (UKR)
13	Serena Di Benedetto (CAN)
14	Vestina Danisevičiūtė (LTU)
15	Sıla Aykul (TUR)
16	Maria Ferone (ITA)
17	Ekaterina Karpushkina (UWW)
18	Milana Mitrović (SRB)
19	Antonia Valdés (CHI)
