= Wrestling at the 2026 Mediterranean Games – Men's freestyle 86 kg =

Wrestling competitions

Men's Freestyle 86 kg at the 2026 Mediterranean Games
- Venue: PalaWojtyla
- Date: 23–24 August
- Competitors: 9 from 9 nations

Medalists
gold medal	Georgios Kougioumtsidis	Greece
silver medal	İsmail Küçüksolak	Turkey
bronze medal	Ahmad Magomedov	North Macedonia
bronze medal	Rakhim Magamadov	France

The Men's Freestyle 86 kg competition of the wrestling events at the 2026 Mediterranean Games in Martina Franca, Italy, was held from 23 to 24 August at the PalaWojtyla.

== Results ==
Legend

- F — Won by fall

Round of 16
Fateh Benferdjallah (ALG)	8
Gabriele Niccolini (ITA)	17

Quarterfinals
Mohamad Al-Osta (SYR)	0
Gabriele Niccolini (ITA)	10
Georgios Kougioumtsidis (GRE)	10
Ahmad Magomedov (MKD)	0
Charalampos Choiras (CYP)	0
Gabriel Iglesias (ESP)	10
İsmail Küçüksolak (TUR)	11
Rakhim Magamadov (FRA)	11

Semifinals
Gabriele Niccolini (ITA)	0
Georgios Kougioumtsidis (GRE)	10
Gabriel Iglesias (ESP)	0
İsmail Küçüksolak (TUR)	5

Final
Georgios Kougioumtsidis (GRE)	8
İsmail Küçüksolak (TUR)	0

Bronze medals
Ahmad Magomedov (MKD)	10
Gabriele Niccolini (ITA)	0
Gabriel Iglesias (ESP)	0
Rakhim Magamadov (FRA)	10
