= Wrestling at the 2026 Mediterranean Games – Women's freestyle 53 kg =

Wrestling competitions

Women's freestyle 53 kg at the 2026 Mediterranean Games
- Venue: PalaWojtyla
- Date: 24–25 August
- Competitors: 8 from 8 nations

Medalists
| gold medal | Zeynep Yetgil | Turkey |
| silver medal | Carla Jaume | Spain |
| bronze medal | Cheima Chebila | Algeria |
| bronze medal | Tatiana Debien | France |

The Women's Freestyle 53 kg competition of the wrestling events at the 2026 Mediterranean Games in Martina Franca, Italy, was held from 24 to 25 August at the PalaWojtyla.

== Results ==
Legend

- F — Won by fall
- R — Retired

| Quarterfinals | | Semifinals | | Final |
| Dorentina Nezaj (KOS) | 0 |
| Zineb Ech-Chabki (MAR) | 4^{F} | Zineb Ech-Chabki (MAR) | 0 |
| Cheima Chebila (ALG) | 0 | Carla Jaume (ESP) | 10 |
| Carla Jaume (ESP) | 7 | | | Carla Jaume (ESP) | 0 |
| Tatiana Debien (FRA) | 6^{F} | | | Zeynep Yetgil (TUR) | 10 |
| Naomi Liuzzi (ITA) | 0 | Tatiana Debien (FRA) | 1 |
| Zeynep Yetgil (TUR) | WO | Zeynep Yetgil (TUR) | 2 |
| Maria Prevolaraki (GRE) |

Bronze medals
Cheima Chebila (ALG) | 6
Zineb Ech-Chabki (MAR) | 1
