= Swimming at the 2026 Mediterranean Games – Men's 200 metre individual medley =

Men's 200 metre individual medley at the 2026 Mediterranean Games
- Location: Taranto, Italy
- Dates: 25 August
- Competitors: 12 from 8 nations
- Winning time: 1:57.70 GR

Medalists
gold medal	Simone Spediacci	Italy
silver medal	Berke Saka	Turkey
bronze medal	Jacopo Barbotti	Italy

The men's 200 metre individual medley competition at the 2026 Mediterranean Games was held on 24 August at the Torre d'Ayala Swimming Stadium in Taranto.

== Records ==
Prior to this competition, the existing world and Mediterranean Games records were as follows:

World record	Léon Marchand (FRA)	1:52.69	Singapore	30 July 2025
Mediterranean Games record	Oussama Mellouli (TUN)	1:58.38	Pescara, Italy	27 June 2009

== Results ==
=== Heats ===
Heats were held at 10:00.

Rank	Heat	Lane	Name	Nationality	Time	Notes
1	1	5	Simone Spediacci	Italy	2:00.48	Q
2	1	4	Berke Saka	Turkey	2:01.36	Q
3	2	3	Emre Onuş	Turkey	2:01.67	Q
4	2	4	Jacopo Barbotti	Italy	2:01.74	Q
5	2	5	Apostolos Papastamos	Greece	2:02.48	Q
6	2	2	Gabriel Lopes	Portugal	2:02.95	Q
7	1	6	Iason Routoulas	Greece	2:02.98	Q
8	2	6	Diego Mira	Spain	2:03.25	Q
9	1	2	Munzer Kabbara	Lebanon	2:04.07	R1
10	1	3	Alberto Hernández	Spain	2:04.41	R2
11	2	7	Strahinja Maslo	Serbia	2:05.50	
12	1	7	Jaš Berložnik	Slovenia	2:07.60	
	2	1	Niko Janković	Croatia	DNS	

=== Final ===
The final was held at 18:05.

Rank	Lane	Name	Nationality	Time	Notes
1st place, gold medalist(s)	4	Simone Spediacci	Italy	1:57.70	GR
2nd place, silver medalist(s)	5	Berke Saka	Turkey	1:58.66	
3rd place, bronze medalist(s)	6	Jacopo Barbotti	Italy	1:59.28	
4	7	Gabriel Lopes	Portugal	1:59.80	
5	2	Apostolos Papastamos	Greece	2:00.86	
6	3	Emre Onuş	Turkey	2:01.13	
7	1	Iason Routoulas	Greece	2:02.61	
8	8	Diego Mira	Spain	2:07.57	
