= Swimming at the 2026 Mediterranean Games – Men's 50 metre breaststroke =

Men's 50 metre breaststroke at the 2026 Mediterranean Games
- Venue: Stadio del nuoto Torre d'Ayala
- Location: Taranto, Italy
- Dates: 24 August
- Competitors: 15 from 8 nations
- Winning time: 27.24

Medalists
| gold medal | Hüseyin Emre Sakçı | Turkey |
| silver medal | Gabriele Mancini | Italy |
| bronze medal | Nusrat Allahverdi | Turkey |

The men's 50 metre breaststroke competition at the 2026 Mediterranean Games was held on 24 August at the Torre d'Ayala Swimming Stadium in Taranto.

== Records ==
Prior to this competition, the existing world and Mediterranean Games records were as follows:

| World record | Adam Peaty (GBR) | 25.95 | Budapest, Hungary | 25 July 2017 |
| Mediterranean Games record | Fabio Scozzoli (ITA) | 26.97 | Oran, Algeria | 2 July 2022 |

== Results ==
=== Heats ===
Heats were started at 10:23.

| Rank | Heat | Lane | Name | Nationality | Time | Notes |
|---|---|---|---|---|---|---|
| 1 | 2 | 4 | Hüseyin Emre Sakçı | Turkey | 27.40 | q |
| 2 | 2 | 5 | Flavio Mangiamele | Italy | 27.65 | q |
| 3 | 1 | 5 | Nusrat Allahverdi | Turkey | 27.69 | q |
| 4 | 1 | 4 | Gabriele Mancini | Italy | 27.70 | q |
| 5 | 2 | 3 | Uroš Živanović | Serbia | 27.87 | q |
| 6 | 1 | 3 | Joaquín Pardo | Spain | 27.95 | q |
| 7 | 2 | 6 | Samy Boutouil | Morocco | 28.06 | q |
| 8 | 1 | 6 | Ahmed Yassine Fliyou | Morocco | 28.52 | q |
| 9 | 2 | 2 | Panayiotis Panaretos | Cyprus | 28.61 | R1 |
| 10 | 2 | 1 | Giacomo Casadei | San Marino | 28.84 | R2 |
| 11 | 1 | 2 | Savvas Thomoglou | Greece | 29.00 | |
| 12 | 2 | 7 | Marios Zafeiropoulos | Greece | 29.21 | |
| 13 | 1 | 7 | Vito Radoš | Croatia | 29.45 | |
| 14 | 1 | 1 | Youssef Abboud | Lebanon | 29.46 | |
| 15 | 2 | 8 | Munzer Mark Kabbara | Lebanon | 30.05 | |

=== Final ===
Final was held at 18:15.

| Rank | Lane | Name | Nationality | Time | Notes |
|---|---|---|---|---|---|
| 1st place, gold medalist(s) | 4 | Hüseyin Emre Sakçı | Turkey | 27.24 | |
| 2nd place, silver medalist(s) | 6 | Gabriele Mancini | Italy | 27.26 | |
| 3rd place, bronze medalist(s) | 3 | Nusrat Allahverdi | Turkey | 27.39 | |
| 4 | 5 | Flavio Mangiamele | Italy | 27.59 | |
| 5 | 2 | Uroš Živanović | Serbia | 27.89 | |
| 6 | 1 | Samy Boutouil | Morocco | 28.09 | |
| 7 | 7 | Joaquín Pardo | Spain | 28.32 | |
| 8 | 8 | Ahmed Yassine Fliyou | Morocco | 28.69 | |
