= Swimming at the 2026 Mediterranean Games – Men's 200 metre butterfly =

Men's 200 metre butterfly at the 2026 Mediterranean Games
- Location: Taranto, Italy
- Dates: 25 August
- Competitors: 13 from 10 nations
- Winning time: 1:55.29

Medalists
gold medal	Alberto Razzetti	Italy
silver medal	Andrea Camozzi	Italy
bronze medal	Polat Uzer Turnalı	Turkey

The Men's 200 metre butterfly competition at the 2026 Mediterranean Games was held on 25 August 2026 at the Torre d'Ayala Swimming Stadium in Taranto.

== Records ==
Prior to this competition, the existing world and Mediterranean Games record were as follows:

World record	Kristóf Milák (HUN)	1:50.34	Budapest, Hungary	21 June 2022
Mediterranean Games record	Velimir Stjepanović (SRB)	1:56.19	Mersin, Tunisia	1 July 2013

During the competition, Alberto Razzetti break the Mediterranean Games record in the final, winning the gold medal in 1:55.29. He improved the previous record of 1:56.19, set by Velimir Stjepanović at the 2013 Mediterranean Games, by 0.90 seconds.

Record	Athlete	Time	Location	Date	Improvement
Mediterranean Games record	Alberto Razzetti (ITA)	1:55.29	Taranto, Italy	25 August 2026	-0.90 s

== Results ==
=== Heats ===
The heats were started at 10:37.

Rank	Heat	Lane	Swimmer	Nation	Time	Notes
1	1	4	Andrea Camozzi	Italy	1:57.12	q
2	1	5	Miguel Martínez Novoa	Spain	1:58.31	q
3	1	3	Polat Uzer Turnalı	Turkey	1:59.28	q
4	2	6	Tuncer Berk Ertürk	Turkey	1:59.44	q
4	2	4	Alberto Razzetti	Italy	1:59.44	q
6	2	5	Apostolos Siskos	Greece	2:00.31	q
7	2	3	Vasco Alves Morgado	Portugal	2:00.75	q
8	1	2	Jaka Pusnik	Slovenia	2:00.79	q
9	2	2	Fares Benzidoun	Algeria	2:01.44	
10	1	6	Kevins Panchiy Apseniece	Portugal	2:02.10	
11	2	7	Alessandro Rebosio	San Marino	2:06.87	
12	1	7	Rayan Arkadan	Lebanon	2:08.14	
13	2	1	Karlo Percinić	Croatia	2:12.93	

=== Final ===
The final was held at 18:33.

Rank	Lane	Swimmer	Nation	Time	Notes
1st place, gold medalist(s)	6	Alberto Razzetti	Italy	1:55.29	GR
2nd place, silver medalist(s)	4	Andrea Camozzi	Italy	1:57.29	
3rd place, bronze medalist(s)	3	Polat Uzer Turnalı	Turkey	1:57.54	
4	1	Vasco Alves Morgado	Portugal	1:58.08	
5	7	Apostolos Siskos	Greece	1:58.46	
6	5	Miguel Martínez Novoa	Spain	1:58.52	
7	2	Tuncer Berk Ertürk	Turkey	1:59.29	
8	8	Jaka Pusnik	Slovenia	2:01.50	
