= Wrestling at the 2026 Mediterranean Games – Women's freestyle 68 kg =

Wrestling competitions

Women's freestyle 68 kg at the 2026 Mediterranean Games
- Venue: PalaWojtyla
- Date: 24–25 August
- Competitors: 9 from 9 nations

Medalists
gold medal	Nesrin Baş	Turkey
silver medal	Laura Godino	Italy
bronze medal	Pauline Lecarpentier	France
bronze medal	Zaineb Sghaier	Tunisia

The Women's Freestyle 68 kg competition of the wrestling events at the 2026 Mediterranean Games in Martina Franca, Italy, was held from 24 to 25 August at the PalaWojtyla.

== Results ==
Legend

- F — Won by fall
- R — Retired

Round of 16
Nikoleta Barmpa (GRE)	1
Pauline Lecarpentier (FRA)	4

Quarterfinals
Nesrin Baş (TUR)	6
Pauline Lecarpentier (FRA)	0
Sabah Khamis (EGY)	8
Maša Perović (SRB)	2
Veronika Vilk (CRO)	10
Albina Drazhi (ALB)	5
Zaineb Sghaier (TUN)	4
Laura Godino (ITA)	7

Semifinals
Nesrin Baş (TUR)	10
Sabah Khamis (EGY)	0
Veronika Vilk (CRO)	3
Laura Godino (ITA)	13

Final
Nesrin Baş (TUR)	4
Laura Godino (ITA)	2

Bronze medals
Pauline Lecarpentier (FRA)	4
Sabah Khamis (EGY)	1
Zaineb Sghaier (TUN)	7
Veronika Vilk (CRO)	1
