= Ali Talib =

Ali Talib may refer to:

- Ali Talib Al-Ajmi (born 1984), Omani footballer
- Ali Talib (artist), Iraqi painter
