= Damla Köse =

Turkish sport shooter (born 2000)

Personal information
- Born: 17 June 2000 (age 26) Kastamonu, Turkey
- Education: physical education and sport teaching at Erzurum Technical University

Sport
- Sport: Shooting
- Event: Air rifle
- Club: Erzurum GSK
- Coached by: Mustafa Burak Çağlar
Medal record
Women's shooting
Representing Turkey
World Championships
Bronze medal – third place	2025 Cairo	10 m rifle Mixed team
European Championships
Gold medal – first place	2026 Yerevan	10 m air rifle solo
Silver medal – second place	2025 Osijek	10 m air rifle solo
Silver medal – second place	2026 Yerevan	10 m air rifle team
Mediterranean Games
Bronze medal – third place	2026 Taranto	10 m air rifle mixed team

Damla Köse (born 17 June 2000) is a Turkish sport shooter who competes in air rifle events.

== Sport career ==
Köse competes in air rifle events and is a member of Erzurum GSK, where she is coached by Mustafa Burak Çağlar.

In 2023, she set a new record at the Turkish Interuniversity Shooting Championship in Trabzon with 626.8 points renewing her own record from previous year.

She competed in the air rifle solo event at the 2025 European 10 m Events Championships in Osijek, Croatia, and advanced to the finals setting a tournament record with 56 points. In the gold medal match, she lost to Norwegian Jeanette Hegg Duestad by 15–10, and took the silver medal. She won the bronze medal in the 10 m air rifle mixed team event with her teammate Mert Nalbant defating the Italians Carlotta Salafia and Danilo Sollazzo by 16–10 at the 2025 ISSF World Shooting Championships in Cairo, Egypt.

== Personal life ==
Damla Köse was born in Erzurum, Turkey on 17 June 2000.

She is a student of sport coaching in the Sports Science Faculty at Erzurum Technical University.
