= Derin Kumuk =

Turkish rower (born 2008)

Personal information
- Nationality: Turkish
- Born: 15 July 2008 (age 18)

Sport
- Country: Turkey
- Sport: Rowing
- Events: Lightweight single sculls (LW1x), double sculls (LW2x)
- Club: Fenerbahçe Rowing
Medal record
Women's Rowing
Representing Turkey
Mediterranean Games
Silver medal – second place	2026 Taranto	W2x

Derin Kumuk (born 15 July 2008) is a Turkish rower competing in the lightweight single sculls and double sculls events. She is a member of Fenerbahçe Rowing, and represents Turkey at international competitions.

== Sport career ==
Kumuk competed in the W2x (women's double sculls) event at the 2025 World U19 Championships in Trakai, Lithuania, where she finished on the eleventh place. At the 2025 Balkan Championships in Ioannina, Greece, she won the silver medal in the U19 W1x (women's single sculls) and the bronze medal in the U19 W4x (women's quadruple sculls) with Beren Lina Çemberci, Hüma Naz Saçlı, Ela Easlan.

In 2026, she finished sixth in the W2x (women's double sculls) final at the European U19 Championships in Brandenburg, Germany. That same year, she competed in the W1x at the 2026 World U19 Championships in Plovdiv, Bulgaria, she placed fifth in the B final. She won the silver medal in the W2x event with teammate Elis Özbay at the 2026 Mediterranean Games in Taranto, Italy.

== Personal life ==
Born on 15 July 2008, Derin Kumuk is a native of Istanbul, Turkey. She lives in Tuzla, Istanbul, and attends the high school of Terakki Foundation Schools.
