= Yavuz İlnam =

Turkish sport shooter (born 1987)

Personal information
- Nationality: Turkish
- Born: 23 July 1987 (age 39) Istanbul, Turkey

Sport
- Country: Turkey
- Sport: Shooting sport
- Club: Istanbul Hunting and Shooting Club
Medal record
Men's shooting
Representing Turkey
European Championships
Gold medal – first place	2024 Lonato	Team trap
Gold medal – first place	2026 Athens	Team trap
Silver medal – second place	2024 Lonato	Trap
Bronze medal – third place	2025 Chateauroux	Team trap
Mediterranean Games
Gold medal – first place	2026 Taranto	Mixed team trap
Bronze medal – third place	2013 Mersin	Double trap

Yavuz İlnam (born 23 July 1987) is a Turkish trap shooter. He is a member of Istanbul Hunting and Shooting Club.

İlnamı won the bronze medal in the men's trap, and the gold medal in the men's team trap event at the 2015 Summer Universiade in Gwangju, South Korea.

He earned a quota spot for the 2016 Summer Olympics.
