= Petar Jovanović =

Petar Jovanović may refer to:

- Petar Jovanović (footballer)
- Petar Jovanović (basketball)
- Petar Jovanović (metropolitan)
