= Carla Jaume =

Spanish freestyle wrestler (born 2004)

Carla Jaume Soler
Personal information
- Full name: Carla Jaume Soler
- Nationality: Spanish
- Born: 2 February 2004 (age 22) Palma de Mallorca, Balearic Islands, Spain
- Height: 164 cm (5 ft 5 in)

Sport
- Country: Spain
- Sport: Amateur wrestling
- Weight class: 53kg
- Event: Freestyle
- Club: Sa Formigueta (Mallorca)
- Coached by: Francisco Javier Sanchez
Medal record
Women's freestyle wrestling
Representing Spain
Grand Prix
Gold medal – first place	2026 Nice	55 kg
Mediterranean Games
Silver medal – second place	2026 Taranto	53 kg
U23 World Championships
Bronze medal – third place	2025 Novi Sad	53 kg
Bronze medal – third place	2026 Las Vegas	53 kg
U23 European Championships
Silver medal – second place	2026 Zrenjanin	53 kg
Bronze medal – third place	2025 Tirana	53 kg
Junior World Championships
Silver medal – second place	2024 Pontevedra	53 kg
Junior European Championships
Bronze medal – third place	2024 Novi Sad	53 kg

Carla Jaume Soler (born 2 February 2004) is a female Spanish freestyle wrestler. 2x Senior Spanish National Champion. 2026 U23 european runner-up, 2025 U23 european and world bronze medalist. 2024 junior world runner-up.

== Background ==
She was born and raised in Palma de Mallorca, Spain, where she started wrestling at the age of eleven under her currently coach Francisco Javier Sanchez.

== Sport career ==
She has started competing with successfully results since 2024. In June, she won her first senior national title at the Spanish championships, in the final match she over Pau Gimeno Franco of Valencia. In July, Soler earned one of the bronze medals at the U20 European Championships in Novi Sad, Serbia. In September, she became U20 world finalist and first-ever female Spanish wrestler, who got that high trophy. In March 2025, she earned one of the bonze medals from U23 European Championships held in Tirana, Albania. In March 2025 she won a silver medal at the U23 european championships in Serbia.

== Wrestling achievements ==
- 2024, 2025 Spanish National Championships – 1st.
- 2024 Junior European Championships – 3rd.
- 2024 Junior World Championships – 2nd.
- 2025 U23 European Championships – 3rd.
- 2025 U23 World Championships – 3rd.
- 2026 U23 European Championships – 2nd.
