= Eleni Antoniadou =

Greek public figure

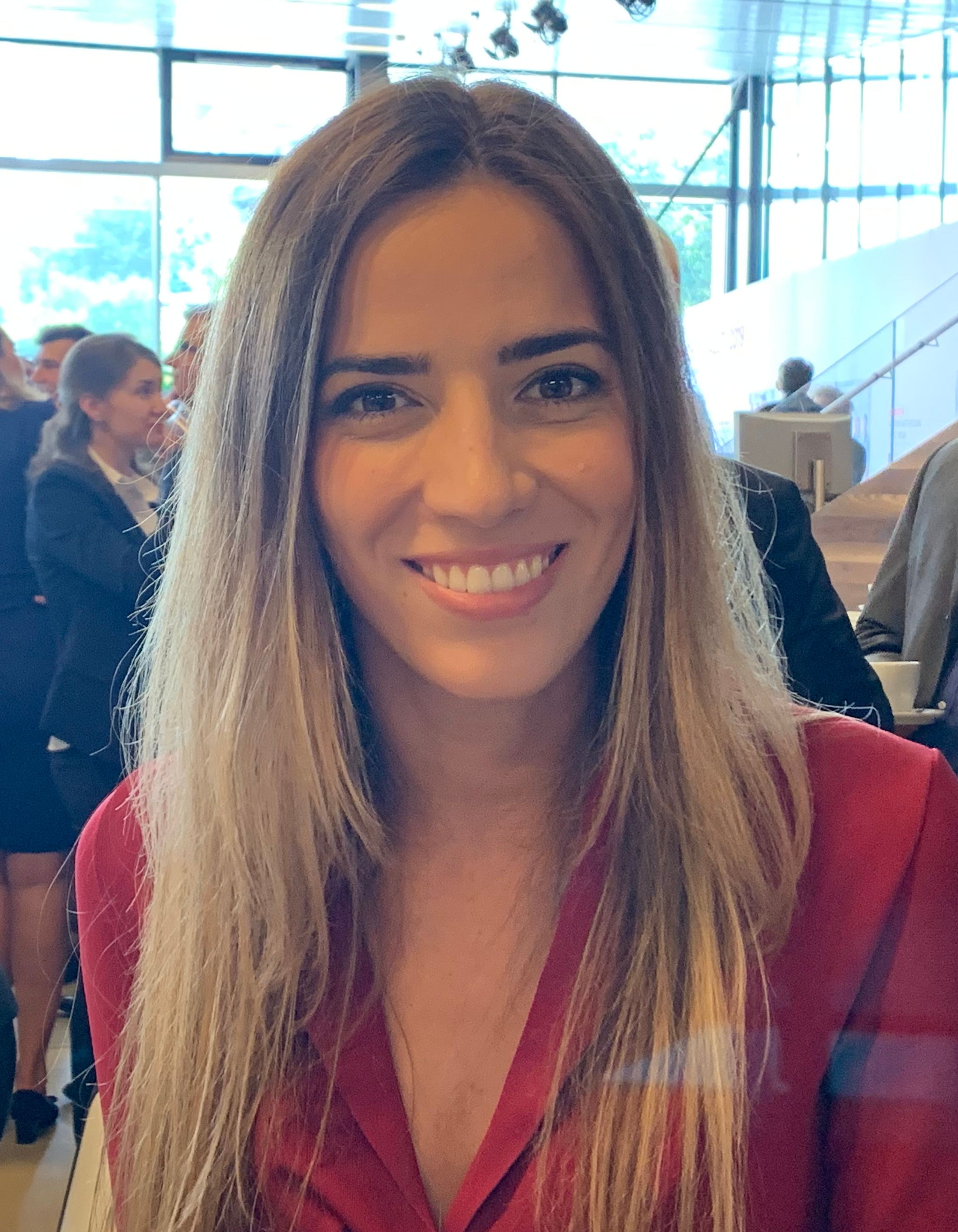
Eleni Antoniadou in 2019

Eleni Antoniadou (Greek: Ελένη Αντωνιάδου; born 1988) is a Greek public figure and scientist.

She has changed her name to Dr Eleni Dimokidis.

== Background ==
=== Early life and education ===
Eleni Antoniadou was born in 1988 in Thessaloniki, Greece. She studied Computer Science and Biomedical Informatics at the University of Central Greece and received a master's degree in Nanotechnology and Regenerative Medicine from University College London.

=== Career ===
She has been reported as being a scientist active in the fields of regenerative medicine, artificial organ bioengineering and space medicine. Antoniadou co-founded a company called Transplants without Donors.

In 2014, she was included in the BBC's 100 Women, and in 2015 in Forbes 30 amazing women under 30.

In 2016 she served as president of the 2nd regular annual convention of the European Health Parliament, which describes itself as a multidisciplinary movement to suggest solutions for health to the European Union policymakers.

Toy maker Mattel produced a special edition Barbie doll with Antoniadou's image as part of their 60th anniversary Role Models series. The replica was the first time a Barbie doll portrayed a woman from Greece.

=== Criticism ===
After a commendation by the Minister of Education Niki Kerameus in 2019, scientists raised concerns that Greek media may not have verified her academic credentials and that she may have misrepresented her achievements. Greek Wikipedia later modified its article on Antoniadou after the misrepresentations were revealed, and Greek think tank Dianeosis (διαΝΕΟσις) removed her from their advisory committee.

According to the website 'Ellinika Hoaxes', the claim that she is "the scientist who made the world's first artificial trachea from stem cells that were successfully transplanted into a patient" is untrue, as the recipient died just 18 months after the operation, while the surgeon who performed it, Paolo Macchiarini, was heavily criticized for wrong medical practices and fired from the Karolinska Institute where he worked. Antoniadou's name was absent from the scientific publication concerning both the construction of the trachea and the operation. A few months after the death of the patient, Antoniadou appeared in interviews and incorrectly stated that the patient survived. The publication in the Journal of Biomedical Materials Research is now retracted.

Despite the relevant reports and her resume, Antoniadou did not work directly for NASA nor did she participate in astronaut training, as reported in an interview, but instead participated in a short-lived space clothing experiment. The claim that she received the NASA-ESA Outstanding Researcher Award in 2012 is not confirmed. According to NASA Johns Hopkins University space scientist Stamatis Krimizis, NASA and ESA have only separate awards. It also does not have a name on NASA's list of recipient awards until 2012.

A BBC publication heavily criticised Greek media and their role, which, while conducting several interviews with Antoniadou, did not verify or factcheck whether what was attributed to her was correct. The BBC itself had earlier included her in the 100 Women of 2014. The European People's Party included her in a Twitter post as one of the 11 most important Greeks of the twentieth century.
