= Fatma Çekiç =

Turkish karateka (born 2003)

- Born: Fatma Uygur; 24 January 2003 (age 23); Malatya, Turkey
- Nationality: Turkish
- Division: +68 kg
- Style: Karate Kumite

Fatma Çekiç (born Fatma Uygur; 24 January 2003) is a Turkish karateka competing in the kumite +68 kg. She is a member of İstanbul Büyükşehir Belediyespor Karate, and represents Turkey at international competitions.

== Sport career ==
Çekiç was introduced to karate at the age of three and a half, with her karate oach father's encouragement. She was also influenced by her karateka brother. Coached by her father, she trained hard, and improved rapidly. She won the Turkish championship in the +54 kg Cadets category, and was selected to the national team thanks to her achievements. Until her age of sixteen, she had won 28 gold, 20 silver, and 14 bronze medals in different age and weight categories.

She captured the gold medal in the Junior +59 kg event at the 2019 Balkan Karate Championships in North Macedonia.

In 2021, she competed for the first time in the Seniors category, and became Turkish champion in Adana She took a bronze medal in the U21 +68 kg event at the 2021 Balkan Karate Championships for Cadets, Juniors and U21 in Rijeka, Croatia.

She won a bronze medal in the +68 kg event at the 2026 Mediterranean Games in Taranto, Italy.

== Personal life ==
Born with maiden name Uygur on 24 January 2003, Fatma Çekiç is a native of Malatya, eastren Turkey. She has six siblings. Her father, Zeki Uygur, is a former karateka and professional karate coach, he brother, Bayram, a former national karateka, as well as Burak, her sister-in-law, Umay Uygur, are all national karateka, her other brothers, Emrah, Mehmet and Sabır Ahmet are also active karateka.

She is a student at Istanbul Aydın University.
