= Giannis Papadopoulos =

Giannis, Yiannis or Ioannis Papadopoulos may refer to:

- Giannis Papadopoulos (footballer, born 1989)
- Giannis Papadopoulos (footballer, born 1998)
- Yiannis Papadopoulos (guitarist)
- Ioannis Papadopoulos (chess player)
