= Zehra Demirhan =

Turkish freestyle wrestler (born 2001)

Personal information
- Nationality: Turkish
- Born: 5 August 2001 (age 25) Siirt, Turkey

Sport
- Country: Turkey
- Sport: Women's freestyle wrestling
- Event: 50 kg
- Club: ASKİ
Medal record
Women's freestyle wrestling
Representing Turkey
Mediterranean Games
Gold medal – first place	2026 Taranto	50 kg

Zehra Demirhan (born 5 August 2001) is a Turkish freestyle wrestler competing in the 50 kg division. She is a member of ASKİ SK in Ankara, and the Turkey national team.

== Sports career ==
Demirhan started sport wrestling in 2013 by taking her older sister, a national wrestler, as an example.

She debuted internationally at the 2015 Balkan Wrestling Championships in Senta, Serbia, and won the gold medal in the 37 kg division . She took a bronze medal at the 2021 European Juniors Championships in Dortmund, German, and another bronze mea+dal at the 2021 World Junior Wrestling Championships in 2021 World Junior Championships in Ufa, Russia.

In 2022 and 2023, she became champion in the 50 kg at the Turkish Women's U23 Wrestling Championships in Tekirdağ. She became bronze medalist at the 2022 European U23 Championships in Plovdiv, Bulgaria. At the 2022 World Championships in Belgrade, Serbia, she did not advance from the Round of 32, and at the 2022 U23 World WChampionships, she took the eight place in the 50 kg event.

At the 2023 European U23 Championships in Bucharest, Romania, she took a bronze medal in the 50 kg event, and another bronze medal at the 2023 Yasar Dogu Tournament in Istanbul, Turkey. At the 2023 U23 World Championships in Tirana, Albania, she lost the Round of 16 match.

At the same competition the next year in Baku, Azerbaijan, she won the silver medal. She lost the Round of 16 game at the 2024 U23 World Championships in Tirana, Albania.

She competed in the 50 kg event at the 2025 Islamic Solidarity Games in Riyadh, Saudi Arabia, without having made to the semifinals.

She represents her country at the 2026 Mediterranean Games in Taranto, Italy.

== Personal life ==
Born on 5 August 2001, Zehra Demirhan is a native of Siirt, southeastern Turkey. her elder sister Evin Demirhan Yavuz is also a national sport wrestler.

She studied Physical education at the Siirt University.
