= Bosnia and Herzegovina at the 2026 Mediterranean Games =

- IOC code: BIH
- NOC: Olympic Committee of Bosnia and Herzegovina

in Taranto, Italy
- Competitors: 79 in 15 sports
- Flag bearers: Haris Husić, Džejla Makaš
- Medals Ranked 20th: Gold 1 Silver 0 Bronze 5 Total 6

Mediterranean Games appearances (overview)
- 1993; 1997; 2001; 2005; 2009; 2013; 2018; 2022; 2026

Other related appearances
- Yugoslavia (1951–1991)

Bosnia and Herzegovina competed at the 2026 Mediterranean Games in Taranto, Italy over 14 days from 21 August to 3 September 2026. At this competition, the Bosnia and Herzegovina men's national water polo team made its first appearance on the international stage.

== Medals by sport ==
Sport	Gold	Silver	Bronze	Total
Shooting	1	0	0	1
Karate	0	0	2	2
Boxing	0	0	1	1
Judo	0	0	1	1
Taekwondo	0	0	1	1
Totals (5 entries)	1	0	5	6

=== Medalists ===
Medal	Name	Sport	Event	Date
Gold	Zakira Pušina	Shooting	Women's rifle	26 August
Bronze	Dylan Rajić	Boxing	Men's super heavyweight	26 August
Bronze	Nejra Sipović	Karate	Women's 55 kg	1 September
Bronze	Amina Fejzić	Karate	Women's 68 kg	1 September
Bronze	Ada Avdagić	Taekwondo	Women's 57 kg	22 August
Bronze	Toni Miletić	Judo	Men's 90 kg	29 August
