= Serbia at the 2026 Mediterranean Games =

- IOC code: SRB
- NOC: Olympic Committee of Serbia
- Competitors: 144 in 25 sports
- Flag bearers: Stefan Takov & Bojana Milenković
- Medals Ranked 10th: Gold 7 Silver 10 Bronze 19 Total 36

Mediterranean Games appearances (overview)
- 2009; 2013; 2018; 2022; 2026

Other related appearances
- Yugoslavia (1951–1991); Serbia and Montenegro (1997–2005); Kosovo (2018–pres.)

Serbia competed at the 2026 Mediterranean Games in Taranto, Italy over 14 days from 21 August to 3 September 2026.

== Medals by sport ==
Sport	Gold	Silver	Bronze	Total
Shooting	2	1	2	5
Judo	1	3	3	7
Athletics	1	1	1	3
Rowing	1	1	0	2
Wrestling	1	1	0	2
Canoeing	1	0	2	3
Boxing	0	2	4	6
Taekwondo	0	1	2	3
Table tennis	0	0	2	2
Badminton	0	0	1	1
Volleyball	0	0	1	1
Water polo	0	0	1	1
Totals (12 entries)	7	10	19	36

== Medalists ==
Medal	Name	Sport	Event	Date
Gold	Strahinja Dragosavljević; Veljko Vještica	Canoeing	Men's K-2 500m	23 August
Gold	Aleksandar Komarov	Wrestling	Men's Greco-Roman 97 kg	23 August
Gold	Marko Jorgić	Judo	Men's 66 kg	28 August
Gold	Zorana Arunović	Shooting	Women's 10m Air Pistol	29 August
Gold	Anđelija Stevanović; Aleksa Rakonjac	Shooting	Mixed team 10m Air Rifle	30 August
Gold	Adriana Vilagoš	Athletics	Women's Javelin throw	1 September
Gold	Martin Mačković; Nikolaj Pimenov	Rowing	Men's Double sculls	2 September
Silver	Anđela Šević	Taekwondo	Women's +67 kg	23 August
Silver	Viktor Nemeš	Wrestling	Men's Greco-Roman 87 kg	23 August
Silver	Anđelija Stevanović	Shooting	Women's 10m Air Rifle	26 August
Silver	Marko Pižurica	Boxing	Men's Heavyweight	27 August
Silver	Kristina Kuluhova	Boxing	Women's Lightweight	27 August
Silver	Marica Perišić	Judo	Women's 57 kg	28 August
Silver	Aleksandra Andrić	Judo	Women's 70 kg	29 August
Silver	Milan Bulaja	Judo	Men's 100 kg	29 August
Silver	Jovana Arsić	Rowing	Women's single sculls	1 September
Silver	Ivana Španović	Athletics	Women's Triple jump	1 September
Bronze	Žarko Krajišnik	Taekwondo	Men's 68 kg	22 August
Bronze	Mihajlo Tomić; Anđela Vitman	Badminton	Mixed Doubles	23 August
Bronze	Žarko Jakovljević	Canoeing	Men's K-1 1000m	23 August
Bronze	Žofi Horvat	Canoeing	Women's K-1 500m	23 August
Bronze	Stefan Takov	Taekwondo	Men's 80 kg	23 August
Bronze	Aleksandra Stojadinović	Shooting	Women's 10m Air Rifle	26 August
Bronze	Sara Ćirković	Boxing	Women's Bantamweight	26 August
Bronze	Nikolina Gajić	Boxing	Women's Light middleweight	26 August
Bronze	Artur Alikovič Nagapetjan	Boxing	Men's Bantamweight	26 August
Bronze	Dmitrij Artjomovič Gorbenko	Boxing	Men's Light welterweight	26 August
Bronze	Andrea Stojadinov	Judo	Women's 52 kg	28 August
Bronze	Izabela Lupulesku; Sabina Ruža Šurjan; Reka Bezeg	Table tennis	Women's Team	28 August
Bronze	Igor Vračar	Judo	Men's +100 kg	29 August
Bronze	Jovana Stjepanović	Judo	Women's 78 kg	29 August
Bronze	Serbia women's national volleyball team: Vanja Bukilić; Nataša Čikuc Deans; Jovana Cvetković; Jelena Delić; Mina Mijatović; Bojana Milenković; Marija Miljević; Tamara Miljević; Stefana Pakić; Rada Perović; Nevena Sajić; Ana Malešević; Jovana Punišić	Volleyball	Women's tournament	30 August
Bronze	Zorana Arunović; Damir Mikec	Shooting	Mixed team 10m Air Pistol	31 August
Bronze	Aleksandrija Mitrović	Athletics	Women's Triple jump	1 September
Bronze	Izabela Lupulesku	Table tennis	Women's Singles	2 September
Bronze	Serbia men's national water polo team: Vuk Milojević; Zoran Božović; Viktor Urošević; Bogdan Gavrilović; Luka Pljevančić; Marko Dimitrijević; Vuk Čonkić; Đorđe Vučinić; Vasilije Martinović; Nikola Lukić; Milan Glušac; Vladimir Mišović; Dušan Trtović; Nemanja Stanojević	Water polo	Men's tournament	3 September

== Archery ==
Men

Athlete	Event	Ranking round		Round of 64	Round of 32	Round of 16	Quarterfinals	Semifinals	Final / BM	
Athlete	Event	Score	Seed	Opposition Score	Opposition Score	Opposition Score	Opposition Score	Opposition Score	Opposition Score	Rank
Mihajlo Stefanović	Individual	649	6	Bye	Constantinos Panagi (CYP); W 6–0	Diego Conde Collar (ESP); L 0–6	Did not advance			

Women

Athlete	Event	Ranking round		Round of 32	Round of 16	Quarterfinals	Semifinals	Final / BM	
Athlete	Event	Score	Seed	Opposition Score	Opposition Score	Opposition Score	Opposition Score	Opposition Score	Rank
Anja Brkić	Individual	581	18	Žana Pintarič (SLO); W 6–4	Elia Canales (ESP); L 0–6	Did not advance			

Mixed

Athlete	Event	Round of 16	Quarterfinals	Semifinals	Final / BM	
Athlete	Event	Opposition Score	Opposition Score	Opposition Score	Opposition Score	Rank
Anja Brkić; Mihajlo Stefanović	Team	Roua Ben Abdelkader / Mohamed Hammed (TUN); W 6–0	Roberta di Francesco / Matteo Borsani (ITA); L 2–6	Did not advance		

== Artistic gymnastics ==
Men

Athlete	Event	Qualification		Final	
Athlete	Event	Total	Rank	Total	Rank
Petar Vefić	Parallel bars	13.450	7 Q	13.300	6

== Athletics ==
Men
Track & road events

Athlete	Event	Heat		Final	
Athlete	Event	Result	Rank	Result	Rank
Boško Kijanović	400m	46.75	12	Did not advance	
Aldin Ćatović	1500m	—N/a		3:48.87	13

Field events

Athlete	Event	Final	
Athlete	Event	Result	Rank
Luka Bošković	Long jump	7.94	4
Marko Vlahović	Long jump	7.78	7
Armin Sinančević	Shot put	19.83	5

Women
Track & road events

Athlete	Event	Heat		Final	
Athlete	Event	Result	Rank	Result	Rank
Aleksandra Pešić	400m	53.12	8 q	53.80	8
Milica Emini	100m Hurdles	13.61	8 q	13.49	7
Anja Lukić	100m Hurdles	13.72	10	Did not advance	
Milica Tomašević	3000m Steeplechase	—N/a		9:58.59	7

Field events

Athlete	Event	Final	
Athlete	Event	Result	Rank
Adriana Vilagoš	Javelin throw	65.93	1st place, gold medalist(s)
Marija Vučenović	Javelin throw	57.37	8
Aleksandrija Mitrović	Triple jump	13.69	3rd place, bronze medalist(s)
Ivana Španović	Triple jump	14.09	2nd place, silver medalist(s)

== Badminton ==
Athlete	Event	Round of 32	Round of 16	Quarterfinal	Semifinal	Final	
Athlete	Event	Opposition Score	Opposition Score	Opposition Score	Opposition Score	Opposition Score	Rank
Mihajlo Tomić; Anđela Vitman	Mixed Doubles	Bye	Michail Marios Boulios / Grammatoula Sotiriou (GRE); W 2–0	Mafalda Avelino / Diogo Marreiros Gloria (POR); W 2–0	Yasemen Bektaş / Emre Sönmez (TUR); L 0–2	Did not advance	3rd place, bronze medalist(s)

== Boxing ==
Men

Athlete	Event	Round of 16	Quarterfinals	Semifinals	Final	
Athlete	Event	Opposition Result	Opposition Result	Opposition Result	Opposition Result	Rank
Artur Alikovič Nagapetjan	Bantamweight	Bye	Samet Gümüş (TUR); W 3–2	Christopher Hippocrate (FRA); L 1–4	Did not advance	3rd place, bronze medalist(s)
Dmitrij Artjomovič Gorbenko	Light welterweight	Ruzhdi Rustemovski (MKD); W RSC	Hassen Atia (TUN); W RSC	Soulaimane Samghouli (MAR); L 0–5	Did not advance	3rd place, bronze medalist(s)
Filip Džida	Welterweight	Ahmed Mohamed Abdelmawgoud Aboelfet (EGY); L 2–3	Did not advance			
Rastko Simić	Light heavyweight	Bye	Michail Tsamaldis (GRE); L RSC	Did not advance		
Marko Pižurica	Heavyweight	—N/a	Paolo Caruso (ITA); W 3–2	Mohamed Hossam Aly Abdelmoneim (EGY); W 4–1	Enmanuel Reyes Pla (ESP); L 0–5	2nd place, silver medalist(s)

Women

Athlete	Event	Quarterfinals	Semifinals	Final	
Athlete	Event	Opposition Result	Opposition Result	Opposition Result	Rank
Nikolina Džida	Light flyweight	Martina Vassallo (ITA); L 0–4	Did not advance		
Sara Ćirković	Bantamweight	Marta López Del Arbol (ESP); W 3–2	Sirine Charaabi (ITA); L 2–3	Did not advance	3rd place, bronze medalist(s)
Natalija Šadrina	Featherweight	Irma Testa (ITA); L WO	Did not advance		
Kristina Kuluhova	Lightweight	Bye	Sthelyne Grosy (FRA); W 3–2	Donjeta Sadiku (KOS); L 0–4	2nd place, silver medalist(s)
Anastasija Lukajić	Welterweight	Djouher Benane (ALG); L 0–5	Did not advance		
Nikolina Gajić	Light middleweight	Bye	Maelys Richol (FRA); L 1–4	Did not advance	3rd place, bronze medalist(s)

== Canoeing ==
Men

Athlete	Event	Heats		Semifinals		Final	
Athlete	Event	Time	Rank	Time	Rank	Time	Rank
Žarko Jakovljević	K-1 1000m	3:50.75	2 Q	3:54.35	1 FA	3:51.75	3rd place, bronze medalist(s)
Veljko Vještica	K-1 1000m	4:04.51	3 Q	4:04.68	3 FA	4:10.88	9
Strahinja Dragosavljević; Veljko Vještica	K-2 500m	1:34.01	1 FA	Bye		1:28.92	1st place, gold medalist(s)

Women

Athlete	Event	Heats		Semifinals		Final	
Athlete	Event	Time	Rank	Time	Rank	Time	Rank
Dunja Stanojev	K-1 500m	1:58.86	2 FA	Bye		2:02.87	4
Žofi Horvat	K-1 500m	1:59.66	2 FA	Bye		2:02.59	3rd place, bronze medalist(s)
Žofi Horvat; Kaja Sarić	K-2 500m	—N/a				1:53.62	5

Legend: FA = Qualify to final (medal); FB = Qualify to final B (non-medal)

== Cycling ==
Men

Athlete	Event	Time	Rank
Ognjen Ilić	Road race	3:10:14	23
Mihajlo Stolić	Road race	3:04:45	20
Ognjen Ilić	Time trial	20:51.79	7
Mihajlo Stolić	Time trial	21:33.16	10

== Equestrian ==
Athlete	Horse	Event	Qualification		Final	
Athlete	Horse	Event	Penalties	Rank	Penalties	Rank
Stefan Đoković	Chaperon Rv Z	Jumping individual	26	39	Did not advance	

== Fencing ==
Men

Athlete	Event	Group stage					Round of 16	Quarterfinal	Semifinal	Final / BM	
Athlete	Event	Opposition Score	Opposition Score	Opposition Score	Opposition Score	Rank	Opposition Score	Opposition Score	Opposition Score	Opposition Score	Rank
Veljko Ćuk	Individual foil	Borna Špoljar (CRO); L 3–5	Wallerand Roger (FRA); W 5–1	Giulio Lombardi (ITA); L 1–5	Nikolaos Kontochristopoulos (GRE); W 5–3	3 Q	Wallerand Roger (FRA); L 8–15	Did not advance			

== Finswimming ==
Women

Athlete	Event	Heat		Final	
Athlete	Event	Time	Rank	Time	Rank
Minja Kostić	50m Apnea	19.69	12	Did not advance	
Minja Kostić	50m BI Fins	24.91	13	Did not advance	
Minja Kostić	100m BI Fins	DSQ		Did not advance	

== Judo ==
Men

Athlete	Event	Round of 16	Quarterfinals	Semifinals	Repechage 1	Repechage 2	Final / BM	
Athlete	Event	Opposition Result	Opposition Result	Opposition Result	Opposition Result	Opposition Result	Opposition Result	Rank
Marko Jorgić	−66 kg	Hilmi Mucık (TUR); W 1−0	Valerio Accogli (ITA); W 1–0	Alexis Renard (FRA); W 1–0	—N/a		Petros Christodoulides (CYP); W 1–0	1st place, gold medalist(s)
Mihajlo Simin	−81 kg	Odysseas Georgakis (CYP); W 102−0	Dardan Cena (KOS); W 1–0	João David Sousa do Carmo Fernando (POR); L 0–100	—N/a		Nace Herkovič (SLO); L 0–100	5
Islam Šogenov	−90 kg	Bye	Dani Nieto Trinidad (ESP); L 1–100	Did not advance	Fady Yoshido El Saikaly (LBN); W 100–0	Toni Miletić (BIH); L 0–100	Did not advance	
Milan Bulaja	−100 kg	Bye	Athanasios Mylonelis (GRE); W 100−0	Koussay Ben Ghars (TUN); W 3–1	—N/a		Omar Ashraf Gamaleldin Elsayed Elra (EGY); L 0–10	2nd place, silver medalist(s)
Igor Vračar	+100 kg	Bye	Mikita Sviryd (CRO); L 0–1	Did not advance	Bye	Panagiotis Papanikolaou (GRE); W 10–0	Mohamed El Mehdi Lili (ALG); W 1–0	3rd place, bronze medalist(s)

Women

Athlete	Event	Round of 16	Quarterfinals	Semifinals	Repechage 1	Repechage 2	Final / BM	
Athlete	Event	Opposition Result	Opposition Result	Opposition Result	Opposition Result	Opposition Result	Opposition Result	Rank
Nevena Milić	−48 kg	Laila Kenan (SYR); W 100−1	Tuğçe Beder (TUR); L 0–101	Did not advance	Bye	Morgane Anis (FRA); L 0–10	Did not advance	
Andrea Stojadinov	−52 kg	Laura Gómez Antona (ESP); W 100−0	Soumiya Iraoui (MAR); L 0–10	Did not advance	Bye	Lycia Anais Guebli (ALG); W 1–0	Pauline Cuq (FRA); W 1–0	3rd place, bronze medalist(s)
Marica Perišić	−57 kg	Bye	Ayşenur Budak (TUR); W 100–0	Adriana Rodríguez Salvador (ESP); W 101–0	—N/a		Ana Viktorija Puljiz (CRO); L 0–1	2nd place, silver medalist(s)
Jelena Nišavić	−63 kg	Chaimae Taibi (MAR); W 2–1	Laura Vázquez Fernández (ESP); L 0–100	Did not advance	Bye	Maram Jmour (TUN); W 1–0	Doria Boursas (FRA); L 0–10	5
Aleksandra Andrić	−70 kg	Bye	Sinem Oruç (TUR); W 102–0	Irene Pedrotti (ITA); W 2–0	—N/a		Elisavet Teltsidou (GRE); L 0–10	2nd place, silver medalist(s)
Jovana Stjepanović	−78 kg	Bye	Petrunjela Pavić (CRO); L 0–1	Did not advance	Bye	Claudia Sperotti (ITA); W 10–0	Arij Agueb (TUN); W 100–0	3rd place, bronze medalist(s)

Mixed

Athlete	Event	Round of 16	Quarterfinals	Semifinals	Repechage	Final / BM	
Athlete	Event	Opposition Result	Opposition Result	Opposition Result	Opposition Result	Opposition Result	Rank
Aleksandra Andrić; Milan Bulaja; Marko Jorgić; Jelena Nišavić; Marica Perišić; Mihajlo Simin; Islam Šogenov; Jovana Stjepanović; Andrea Stojadinov; Igor Vračar	Team	Bye	France (FRA); L 0–4	Did not advance	Algeria (ALG); L 3–4	Did not advance	

== Karate ==
Men

Athlete	Event	Round of 16	Quarterfinals	Semifinals	Repechage	Final / BM	
Athlete	Event	Opposition Result	Opposition Result	Opposition Result	Opposition Result	Opposition Result	Rank
Aleksandar Vučković	Kumite −67 kg	Abdullah Backa (ALB); L 3−4	Did not advance				

Women

Athlete	Event	Round of 16	Quarterfinals	Semifinals	Repechage	Final / BM	
Athlete	Event	Opposition Result	Opposition Result	Opposition Result	Opposition Result	Opposition Result	Rank
Teodora Krstović	Kumite −68 kg	Emina Fejzić (BIH); L 1−2	Did not advance				

== Padel ==
Athlete	Event	Round of 32	Round of 16	Quarterfinals	Semifinals	Final / BM	
Athlete	Event	Opposition Score	Opposition Score	Opposition Score	Opposition Score	Opposition Score	Rank
Petar Ćertić; Uroš Aćimović	Men's Doubles	Simon Javoršek / Bostjan Repansek (SLO); L 0–2	Did not advance				
Ana Mirković; Teodora Nikolić	Women's Doubles	Karolina Balog / Lea Jurković (CRO); L 0–2	Did not advance				
Ana Mirković; Uroš Aćimović	Mixed Doubles	—N/a	Simon Javoršek / Tina Lah (SLO); L 0–2	Did not advance			

== Rhythmic gymnastics ==
Athlete	Event	Qualification						Final					
Athlete	Event	Hoop	Ball	Clubs	Ribbon	Total	Rank	Hoop	Ball	Clubs	Ribbon	Total	Rank
Maša Nikolić	All-around	24.450	17.850	20.200	23.100	67.750	17	Did not advance					

== Rowing ==
Men

Athlete	Event	Heats		Final	
Athlete	Event	Time	Rank	Time	Rank
Martin Mačković; Nikolaj Pimenov	Double sculls	6:19.52	1 FA	6:25.37	1st place, gold medalist(s)

Women

Athlete	Event	Heats		Final	
Athlete	Event	Time	Rank	Time	Rank
Jovana Arsić	Single sculls	7:45.50	1 FA	8:03.87	2nd place, silver medalist(s)

== Sailing ==
Men

Athlete	Event	Race											Net points	Final rank
Athlete	Event	1	2	3	4	5	6	7	8	9	10	F	Net points	Final rank
Andrej Bozoki	Dinghy - ILCA7	13	17	17	9	17	15	6	16	~~18~~	9	1	120	14

Women

Athlete	Event	Race											Net points	Final rank
Athlete	Event	1	2	3	4	5	6	7	8	9	10	F	Net points	Final rank
Kristina Boja	Dinghy - ILCA 6	17	19	5	7	13	12	~~20~~	7	18	16	11	125	15

== Shooting ==
Men

Athlete	Event	Qualification		Final	
Athlete	Event	Points	Rank	Points	Rank
Uroš Gajić	10m Air Pistol	569	10	Did not advance	
Damir Mikec	10m Air Pistol	578	1 Q	132.4	7
Lazar Kovačević	10m Air Rifle	627.2	9	Did not advance	
Aleksa Rakonjac	10m Air Rifle	625.5	13	Did not advance	

Women

Athlete	Event	Qualification		Final	
Athlete	Event	Points	Rank	Points	Rank
Zorana Arunović	10m Air Pistol	572	2 Q	239.3	1st place, gold medalist(s)
Jovana Todorović	10m Air Pistol	566	10	Did not advance	
Anđelija Stevanović	10m Air Rifle	632.7	1 Q	251.4	2nd place, silver medalist(s)
Aleksandra Stojadinović	10m Air Rifle	630	3 Q	228.9	3rd place, bronze medalist(s)

Mixed

Athlete	Event	Qualification		Final	
Athlete	Event	Points	Rank	Points	Rank
Zorana Arunović; Damir Mikec	10m Air Pistol	572	4 Q	410.7	3rd place, bronze medalist(s)
Jovana Todorović; Uroš Gajić	10m Air Pistol	563	11	Did not advance	
Anđelija Stevanović; Aleksa Rakonjac	10m Air Rifle	631	1 Q	505.8	1st place, gold medalist(s)
Aleksandra Stojadinović; Lazar Kovačević	10m Air Rifle	629	3 Q	371.7	4

== Swimming ==
Men

Athlete	Event	Heat		Final	
Athlete	Event	Time	Rank	Time	Rank
Justin Cvetkov	50m Freestyle	23.38	15	Did not advance	
Nemanja Maksić	50m Butterfly	24.28	12	Did not advance	
Strahinja Maslo	200m Individual Medley	2:05.50	11	Did not advance	
Strahinja Maslo	400m Individual Medley	4:27.13	6 q	4:27.71	8
Nikola Simić	400m Freestyle	3:53.32	9	Did not advance	
Nikola Simić	800m Freestyle	—N/a		8:02.06	7
Nikola Simić	1500m Freestyle	—N/a		15:15.43	5
Velimir Stjepanović	100m Freestyle	49.66	3 q	49.50	4
Velimir Stjepanović	200m Freestyle	1:50.15	7 q	1:49.66	7
Uroš Živanović	50m Breaststroke	27.87	5 q	27.89	5
Uroš Živanović	100m Breaststroke	1:02.55	9	Did not advance	

Women

Athlete	Event	Heat		Final	
Athlete	Event	Time	Rank	Time	Rank
Martina Bukvić	50m Breaststroke	32.02	5 q	31.96	6
Martina Bukvić	100m Breaststroke	1:09.08	4 q	1:09.39	6
Martina Bukvić	200m Breaststroke	2:35.67	9	Did not advance	
Helena Lalković	50m Freestyle	26.88	15	Did not advance	
Helena Lalković	100m Freestyle	56.77	7 q	56.60	7
Helena Lalković	200m Freestyle	2:03.61	8 q	2:03.87	8
Nina Stanisavljević	50m Freestyle	25.73	5 q	25.70	6
Nina Stanisavljević	50m Backstroke	29.02	5 q	28.74	5
Nina Stanisavljević	50m Butterfly	27.31	7 q	27.21	7
Nina Stanisavljević	100m Butterfly	1:05.85	13	Did not advance	

== Table tennis ==
Men

Athlete	Event	Round of 32	Round of 16	Quarterfinals	Semifinals	Final / BM	
Athlete	Event	Opposition Result	Opposition Result	Opposition Result	Opposition Result	Opposition Result	Rank
Dimitrije Levajac	Singles	Sharpel Elia (CYP); W 4–0	Clément Laine-Campino (POR); L 3–4	Did not advance			

Women

Athlete	Event	Round of 32	Round of 16	Quarterfinals	Semifinals	Final / BM	
Athlete	Event	Opposition Result	Opposition Result	Opposition Result	Opposition Result	Opposition Result	Rank
Izabela Lupulesku	Singles	Chiara Morri (SMR); W 4–0	Aikaterini Toliou (GRE); W 4–1	Ece Haraç (TUR); W 4–2	Xiaoxin Yang (MON); L 1–4	Giorgia Piccolin (ITA); W 4–2	3rd place, bronze medalist(s)
Sabina Ruža Šurjan	Singles	Georgia Avraam (CYP); W 4–0	Sibel Altınkaya (TUR); W 4–0	Giorgia Piccolin (ITA); L 1–4	Did not advance		
Izabela Lupulesku; Sabina Ruža Šurjan; Reka Bezeg	Team	—N/a	Bye	Slovenia (SLO); W 3–2	Egypt (EGY); L 0–3	Turkey (TUR); W 3–0	3rd place, bronze medalist(s)

Mixed

Athlete	Event	Round of 32	Round of 16	Quarterfinals	Semifinals	Final / BM	
Athlete	Event	Opposition Result	Opposition Result	Opposition Result	Opposition Result	Opposition Result	Rank
Dimitrije Levajac; Izabela Lupulesku	Doubles	Bye	Shega Hashani / Kreshnik Mahmuti (KOS); W 3–0	Leo De Nodrest / Camille Lutz (FRA); L 2–3	Did not advance		

== Taekwondo ==
Men

Athlete	Event	Round of 16	Quarterfinals	Semifinals	Final	
Athlete	Event	Opposition Result	Opposition Result	Opposition Result	Opposition Result	Rank
Todor Vasilić	−58 kg	Bye	Josip Teskera (CRO); L 1–2	Did not advance		
Žarko Krajišnik	−68 kg	Elion Agushi (KOS); W 2–0	Joan Jorquera Cala (ESP); W 2–1	Souleyman Alaphilippe (FRA); L 0–2	Did not advance	3rd place, bronze medalist(s)
Stefan Takov	−80 kg	Bye	Angelo Mangione (ITA); W 2–0	Firas Katoussi (TUN); L 1–2	Did not advance	3rd place, bronze medalist(s)
Miloš Golubović	+80 kg	Yamen Faraj (LBN); W 2–1	Ivan Šapina (CRO); L 0–2	Did not advance		

Women

Athlete	Event	Round of 16	Quarterfinals	Semifinals	Final	
Athlete	Event	Opposition Result	Opposition Result	Opposition Result	Opposition Result	Rank
Tina Ninić	−49 kg	Bye	Sayine Krim (FRA); L 0–2	Did not advance		
Jana Lukić	−57 kg	Rona Gashi (KOS); W 2–0	Hatice Kübra İlgün (TUR); L 1–2	Did not advance		
Nina Zećirović	−67 kg	Anna Gertrud Gruber (ITA); W 2–0	Styliani Marentaki (GRE); L 1–2	Did not advance		
Anđela Šević	+67 kg	Carla Alboustany (LBN); W 2–0	Emna Hamadache (FRA); W 2–1	Agoritsa Artemia Kitsiou (GRE); W 2–0	Sude Yaren Uzunçavdar (TUR); L 0–2	2nd place, silver medalist(s)

== Triathlon ==
Athlete	Event	Swim	Trans 1	Bike	Trans 2	Run	Total Time	Rank
Lana Gavrilović	Women's individual	13:16	0:21	35:11	0:34	22:06	1:11:28	12

== Volleyball ==
Summary

Team	Event	Group stage						Semifinal	Final / BM / Pl.	
Team	Event	Opposition Score	Opposition Score	Opposition Score	Opposition Score	Opposition Score	Rank	Opposition Score	Opposition Score	Rank
Serbia men's	Men's tournament	France; L 0–3	Tunisia; L 2–3	Italy; L 0–3	Portugal; W 3–0	Algeria; W 3–2	4	Did not advance		
Serbia women's	Women's tournament	Egypt; W 3–0	Bosnia and Herzegovina; W 3–0	Italy; L 0–3	—N/a	—N/a	2 Q	Turkey; L 1–3	Greece; W 3–2	3rd place, bronze medalist(s)

=== Men's tournament ===
Squad

- Dušan Nikolić
- Lazar Bajandić
- Andrija Vulikić
- Nikola Petrović
- Vladimir Gajović
- Lazar Jeremić
- Dušan Petrović
- Filip Kovačević
- Nikola Brborić
- Aleksandar Šoša
- Žarko Ubiparip
- Andrej Rudić
- Dušan Jović

Group A

Pos	Team	Pld	W	L	Pts	SW	SL	SR	SPW	SPL	SPR	Qualification
1	Italy	5	5	0	15	15	2	7.500	427	356	1.199	Final round
2	France	5	4	1	12	12	4	3.000	396	352	1.125	Final round
3	Tunisia	5	3	2	8	10	8	1.250	417	388	1.075	
4	Serbia	5	2	3	6	8	11	0.727	428	443	0.966	
5	Portugal	5	1	4	2	4	11	0.364	364	436	0.835	
6	Algeria	5	0	5	2	5	15	0.333	415	472	0.879	

Source: Taranto 2026

Date	Time		Score		Set 1	Set 2	Set 3	Set 4	Set 5	Total	Report
21 Aug	12:00	France	3–0	Serbia	25–22	25–21	25–10			75–53	P2 P3
23 Aug	20:00	Serbia	2–3	Tunisia	36–34	22–25	25–19	16–25	16–18	115–121	P2 P3
24 Aug	20:00	Italy	3–0	Serbia	25–19	38–36	25–21			88–76	P2 P3
24 Aug	11:00	Portugal	0–3	Serbia	23–25	19–25	14–25			56–75	P2 P3
28 Aug	11:00	Algeria	2–3	Serbia	19–25	25–23	21–25	25–21	13–15	103–109	P2 P3

=== Women's tournament ===
Squad

- Vanja Bukilić
- Nataša Čikuc Deans
- Jovana Cvetković
- Jelena Delić
- Mina Mijatović
- Bojana Milenković
- Marija Miljević
- Tamara Miljević
- Stefana Pakić
- Rada Perović
- Nevena Sajić
- Ana Malešević
- Jovana Punišić

Group A

Pos	Team	Pld	W	L	Pts	SW	SL	SR	SPW	SPL	SPR	Qualification
1	Italy	3	3	0	9	9	0	MAX	225	147	1.531	Final round
2	Serbia	3	2	1	6	6	3	2.000	207	179	1.156	Final round
3	Bosnia and Herzegovina	3	1	2	3	3	6	0.500	190	203	0.936	
4	Egypt	3	0	3	0	0	9	0.000	133	226	0.588	

Source: Taranto 2026

Date	Time		Score		Set 1	Set 2	Set 3	Set 4	Set 5	Total	Report
21 Aug	14:00	Serbia	3–0	Egypt	25–11	26–24	25–14			76–49	P2 P3
23 Aug	11:00	Serbia	3–0	Bosnia and Herzegovina	25–17	25–18	25–20			75–55	P2 P3
26 Aug	20:00	Italy	3–0	Serbia	25–18	25–21	25–17			75–56	P2 P3

Semifinals

Date	Time		Score		Set 1	Set 2	Set 3	Set 4	Set 5	Total	Report
29 Aug	11:00	Turkey	3–1	Serbia	25–16	23–25	25–21	25–22		98–84	P2 P3

Third place game

Date	Time		Score		Set 1	Set 2	Set 3	Set 4	Set 5	Total	Report
30 Aug	11:00	Greece	2–3	Serbia	25–22	16–25	20–25	25–18	7–15	93–105	P2 P3

== Water polo ==
Squad

- Vuk Milojević
- Zoran Božović
- Viktor Urošević
- Bogdan Gavrilović
- Luka Pljevančić
- Marko Dimitrijević
- Vuk Čonkić
- Đorđe Vučinić
- Vasilije Martinović
- Nikola Lukić
- Milan Glušac
- Vladimir Mišović
- Dušan Trtović
- Nemanja Stanojević

Summary

Team	Event	Group stage				Semifinal	Final / BM / Pl.	
Team	Event	Opposition Score	Opposition Score	Opposition Score	Rank	Opposition Score	Opposition Score	Rank
Serbia men's	Men's tournament	Slovenia; W 32–1	Montenegro; L 13–14	W 15–5	2 Q	Italy; L 10–11	Spain; W 12–8	3rd place, bronze medalist(s)

Group A

Pos	Team	Pld	W	PSW	PSL	L	GF	GA	GD	Pts	Qualification
1	Montenegro	3	3	0	0	0	53	32	+21	9	Semifinals
2	Serbia	3	2	0	0	1	60	20	+40	6	Semifinals
3	Greece	3	1	0	0	2	41	40	+1	3	5–8th place semifinals
4	Slovenia	3	0	0	0	3	15	77	−62	0	5–8th place semifinals

Source: Taranto 2026
Rules for classification: 1) Points; 2) Head-to-head points; 3) Head-to-head goal difference; 4) Head-to-head goals scored; 5) Goal difference; 6) Goals scored; 7) Draw.

28 August 2026; 16:00	Report	Slovenia	1–32	Serbia	Torre D'Ayala Stadium, Taranto; Referees: Gregory Courbin (FRA), Cihan Büyükburç (TUR)
28 August 2026; 16:00	Report	Score by quarters: 0–7, 0–7, 1–9, 0–9			Torre D'Ayala Stadium, Taranto; Referees: Gregory Courbin (FRA), Cihan Büyükburç (TUR)
28 August 2026; 16:00	Report	Potočnik 1	Goals	Urošević, Dimitrijević 5	Torre D'Ayala Stadium, Taranto; Referees: Gregory Courbin (FRA), Cihan Büyükburç (TUR)

30 August 2026; 17:30	Report	Serbia	13–14	Montenegro	Torre D'Ayala Stadium, Taranto; Referees: Maxim Gerasimov (GBR), Alex Marquez Mas (ESP)
30 August 2026; 17:30	Report	Score by quarters: 3–3, 4–4, 4–3, 2–4			Torre D'Ayala Stadium, Taranto; Referees: Maxim Gerasimov (GBR), Alex Marquez Mas (ESP)
30 August 2026; 17:30	Report	Martinović 4	Goals	Gojković 4	Torre D'Ayala Stadium, Taranto; Referees: Maxim Gerasimov (GBR), Alex Marquez Mas (ESP)

1 September 2026; 17:30	Report	Greece	5–15	Serbia	Torre D'Ayala Stadium, Taranto; Referees: Tamás Kovács-Csatlós (HUN), Rok Vehovec (SLO)
1 September 2026; 17:30	Report	Score by quarters: 2–5, 1–4, 1–3, 1–3			Torre D'Ayala Stadium, Taranto; Referees: Tamás Kovács-Csatlós (HUN), Rok Vehovec (SLO)
1 September 2026; 17:30	Report	Pouros 3	Goals	Martinović 5	Torre D'Ayala Stadium, Taranto; Referees: Tamás Kovács-Csatlós (HUN), Rok Vehovec (SLO)

Semifinals

2 September 2026; 17:30	Report	Italy	11–10	Serbia	Torre D'Ayala Stadium, Taranto; Referees: Maxim Gerasimov (GBR), Spyridon Achladiotis (GRE)
2 September 2026; 17:30	Report	Score by quarters: 3–1, 2–6, 3–0, 3–3			Torre D'Ayala Stadium, Taranto; Referees: Maxim Gerasimov (GBR), Spyridon Achladiotis (GRE)
2 September 2026; 17:30	Report	Ferrero 4	Goals	Urošević 4	Torre D'Ayala Stadium, Taranto; Referees: Maxim Gerasimov (GBR), Spyridon Achladiotis (GRE)

Bronze medal game

3 September 2026; 12:00	Report	Spain	8–12	Serbia	Torre D'Ayala Stadium, Taranto; Referees: Marco Ercoli (ITA), Maxim Gerasimov (GBR)
3 September 2026; 12:00	Report	Score by quarters: 2–5, 3–3, 2–2, 1–2			Torre D'Ayala Stadium, Taranto; Referees: Marco Ercoli (ITA), Maxim Gerasimov (GBR)
3 September 2026; 12:00	Report	Daura 3	Goals	Martinović 6	Torre D'Ayala Stadium, Taranto; Referees: Marco Ercoli (ITA), Maxim Gerasimov (GBR)

== Weightlifting ==
Men

Athlete	Event	Snatch		Clean & jerk	
Athlete	Event	Result	Rank	Result	Rank
Balaž Benčik Maša	−85kg	125	7	150	7

Women

Athlete	Event	Snatch		Clean & jerk	
Athlete	Event	Result	Rank	Result	Rank
Radmila Zagorac	−53kg	73	6	95	6

== Wrestling ==
Men's Greco-Roman

Athlete	Event	Round of 16	Quarterfinal	Semifinal	Repechage	Final / BM	
Athlete	Event	Opposition Result	Opposition Result	Opposition Result	Opposition Result	Opposition Result	Rank
Georgij Tibilov	−67 kg	Fayssal Benfredj (ALG); L WO	Did not advance		—N/a	Did not advance	
Ali Arsalan	−77 kg	Moustafa Hussein Fathy Zaky Alameld (EGY); L 0–3	Did not advance				
Viktor Nemeš	−87 kg	Bye	Mohamed Elkasem Elsayed Ahmed Saied (EGY); L 1–1	Did not advance	—N/a	Doğan Kaya (TUR); W 7–5	2nd place, silver medalist(s)

Athlete	Event	Group Stage				Semifinal	Final / BM	
Athlete	Event	Opposition Result	Opposition Result	Opposition Result	Rank	Opposition Result	Opposition Result	Rank
Aleksandar Komarov	−97 kg	Loïc Samen (FRA); W 5–3	Laokratis Kesidis (GRE); W 4–3	Beytullah Kayışdağ (TUR); W 4–1	1 Q	Fadi Rouabah (ALG); W 3–1	Nikoloz Kakhelashvili (ITA); W 3–1	1st place, gold medalist(s)

Women's Freestyle

Athlete	Event	Round of 16	Quarterfinal	Semifinal	Final / BM	
Athlete	Event	Opposition Result	Opposition Result	Opposition Result	Opposition Result	Rank
Milica Perović	−57 kg	—N/a	Achouak Djamila Tekouk (ALG); W 13–2	Lydia Perez Tourino (ESP); L 0–10	Veronika Konsevich (MKD); L 5–7	5
Maša Perović	−68 kg	Bye	Sabah Eid Gomaa Soliman Khamis (EGY); L 2–8	Did not advance		

Athlete	Event	Group Stage			Semifinal	Final / BM	
Athlete	Event	Opposition Result	Opposition Result	Rank	Opposition Result	Opposition Result	Rank
Emilija Jakovljević	−62 kg	Ebru Dağbaşı (TUR); L 1–4	Immacolata Danise (ITA); L 5–7	3	Did not advance		
