= Volleyball at the 2026 Mediterranean Games – Men's team rosters =

This article shows the rosters of all participating teams at the men's indoor volleyball tournament at the 2026 Mediterranean Games in Taranto, Italy.

== Group A ==
=== Algeria ===
The following is the Algeria's roster in the 2026 Mediterranean Games.

Head Coach: (France) Badis Oukarache

=== France ===
The following is the France's roster in the 2026 Mediterranean Games.

Head Coach: (France) Jocelyn Trillon

=== Italy ===
The following is the Italy's roster in the 2026 Mediterranean Games.

Head Coach: (Italy) Vincenzo Fanizza

=== Portugal ===
The following is the Portugal's roster in the 2026 Mediterranean Games.

Head Coach: (Portugal) João António Coelho

=== Serbia ===
The following is the Serbia's roster in the 2026 Mediterranean Games.

Head Coach: (Serbia) Bojan Janić

- 2 Dušan Nikolić OS
- 4 Lazar Bajandić OH
- 7 Andrija Vulikić S
- 8 Nikola Petrović S
- 13 Vladimir Gajović MB
- 17 Lazar Jeremić L
- 18 Dušan Petrović MB
- 19 Filip Kovačević OH
- 20 Nikola Brborić OS
- 31 Aleksandar Šoša OH
- 34 Žarko Ubiparip OH
- 35 Andrej Rudić MB
- 55 Dušan Jović L

=== Tunisia ===
The following is the Tunisia's roster in the 2026 Mediterranean Games.

Head Coach: (Italy) Camillo Placì

== Group B ==
=== Egypt ===
The following is the Egypt's roster in the 2026 Mediterranean Games.

Head Coach: (Egypt) Sayed Salem

- 1 Ahmed Elsayed S
- 6 Mohamed Hassan L
- 7 Seifeldin Ali OS
- 8 Abdelrahman Eissa WS
- 10 Mohamed Masoud MB
- 13 Mohamed Khater MB
- 14 Yossef Morgan S
- 16 Mohamed Soliman MB
- 18 Ahmed Shfik WS
- 19 Zyad Mohamed OS
- 21 Youssef Awad WS
- 23 Ahmed Omar WS

=== Greece ===
The following is the Greece's roster in the 2026 Mediterranean Games.

Head Coach: (Greece) Konstantinos Christofidelis

=== Kosovo ===
The following is the Kosovo's roster in the 2026 Mediterranean Games.

Head Coach: (Montenegro) Darko Prebiračević

=== Spain ===
The following is the Spain's roster in the 2026 Mediterranean Games.

Head Coach: (France) Hubert Henno

=== Turkey ===
The following is the Turkey's roster in the 2026 Mediterranean Games.

Head Coach: (Turkey) Cemal Bora Şensoy
