= Wrestling at the 2026 Mediterranean Games – Men's Greco-Roman 97 kg =

Wrestling competitions

Men's Greco-Roman 97 kg at the 2026 Mediterranean Games
- Venue: PalaWojtyla
- Date: 22–23 August
- Competitors: 9 from 9 nations

Medalists
gold medal	Aleksandr Komarov	Serbia
silver medal	Nikoloz Kakhelashvili	Italy
bronze medal	Fadi Rouabah	Algeria

The Men's Greco-Roman 97 kg competition of the wrestling events at the 2026 Mediterranean Games in Martina Franca, Italy, was held from 22 to 23 August at the PalaWojtyla.

== Results ==
=== Elimination groups ===
==== Group A ====
Pos	Athlete	Pld	W	L	CP	TP
1	Aleksandr Komarov (SRB)	3	3	0	9	13
2	Laokratis Kesidisi (GRE)	3	2	1	9	9
3	Beytullah Kayışdağ (TUR)	3	1	2	6	13
4	Loïc Samen (FRA)	3	0	3	1	3

Source: Taranto 2026

	Score		CP
Laokratis Kesidis (GRE)	3–3	Beytullah Kayışdağ (TUR)	3–1 VPO1
Alesandr Komarov (SRB)	5–3	Loïc Samen (FRA)	3–1 VPO1
Laokratis Kesidis (GRE)	3–4	Aleksandr Komarov (SRB)	1–3 VPO1
Beytullah Kayışdağ (TUR)	9–0	Loïc Samen (FRA)	4–0 VSU1
Laokratis Kesidis (GRE)	3–0 Fall	Loïc Samen (FRA)	5–0 VFA
Alesandr Komarov (SRB)	4–1	Beytullah Kayışdağ (TUR)	3–1 VPO1

==== Group B ====
Pos	Athlete	Pld	W	L	CP	TP
1	Nikoloz Kakhelashvili (ITA)	2	1	1	4	10
2	Fadi Rouabah (ALG)	2	1	1	4	4
3	Mohamed Ali Gabr (EGY)	2	1	1	4	3

Source: Taranto 2026

	Score		CP
Fadi Rouabah (ALG)	3–3	Nikoloz Kakhelashvili (ITA)	3–1 VPO1
Mohamed Ali Gabr (EGY)	2–1	Fadi Rouabah (ALG)	3–1 VPO1
Nikoloz Kakhelashvili (ITA)	7–1	Mohamed Ali Gabr (EGY)	3–1 VPO1

=== Knockout round ===
Semifinals
Aleksandr Komarov (SRB)	3
Fadi Rouabah (ALG)	1
Nikoloz Kakhelashvili (ITA)	5
Laokratis Kesidis (GRE)	2

Final
Aleksandr Komarov (SRB)	3
Nikoloz Kakhelashvili (ITA)	1
Bronze medal
Fadi Rouabah (ALG)	6
Laokratis Kesidis (GRE)	1
