= Canoeing at the 2026 Mediterranean Games – Men's K-2 500 metres =

Men's canoe sprint K-2 500 metres at the 2026 Mediterranean Games
- Venue: Parco Cimino - Mar Piccolo
- Date: 21–23 August
- Competitors: 12 from 12 nations
- Winning time: 1:28.92

Medalists
gold medal	Strahinja Dragosavljević; Veljko Vjestica	Serbia
silver medal	André Moreira; Iago Bebiano	Portugal
bronze medal	Giacomo Cinti; Alessio Campari	Italy

The men's canoe sprint K-2 500 metres at the 2026 Mediterranean Games in Taranto took place between 21 and 23 August at the Parco Cimino – Mar Piccolo.

== Schedule ==
All times are Italy time (UTC+02:00)

Date	Time	Round
Friday, 21 August 2026	9:00	Heats
Saturday, 22 August 2026	9:00	Semifinal
Sunday, 23 August 2026	9:15	Final

== Results ==
=== Heats ===
==== Heat 1 ====
Rank	Canoer	Country	Time	Notes
1	Strahinja Dragosavljević; Veljko Vjestica	Serbia	1:34.01	QF
2	Oscar Juan Allegue Pena; Manuel Rivas Gomez	Spain	1:35.75	QF
3	Matija Preskar; Anže Urankar	Slovenia	1:36.42	QF
4	Rahmi Kaan Karahan; Hasan Saraç	Turkey	1:37.98	QS
5	Mohamed Ismail; Hamza Ahmed	Egypt	1:38.03	QS
6	Antonis Kyriacou; Daniel Sirotin	Cyprus	1:38.50	QS

==== Heat 2 ====
Rank	Canoer	Country	Time	Notes
1	André Moreira; Iago Bebiano	Portugal	1:34.25	QF
2	Giacomo Cinti; Alessio Campari	Italy	1:34.94	QF
3	Telio Le Petit; Noe Martin	France	1:35.92	QF
4	Panagiotis Antoniou; Christos Matsas	Greece	1:36.85	QS
5	Koussay Allagui; Farouk Dali	Tunisia	1:58.35	QS
6	Ryad Bentouati; Ayoub Haidra	Algeria	Did not start	

=== Semifinal ===
Rank	Canoer	Country	Time	Notes
1	Rahmi Kaan Karahan; Hasan Saraç	Turkey	1:37.32	QF
2	Panagiotis Antoniou; Christos Matsas	Greece	1:37.71	QF
3	Antonis Kyriacou; Daniel Sirotin	Cyprus	1:41.54	QF
4	Mohamed Ismail; Hamza Ahmed	Egypt	1:45.65	X
5	Koussay Allagui; Farouk Dali	Tunisia	1:54.97	X

=== Final ===
Rank	Canoer	Country	Time	Notes
1st place, gold medalist(s)	Strahinja Dragosavljević; Veljko Vjestica	Serbia	1:28.92	
2nd place, silver medalist(s)	André Moreira; Iago Bebiano	Portugal	1:30.54	
3rd place, bronze medalist(s)	Giacomo Cinti; Alessio Campari	Italy	1:30.89	
4	Oscar Juan Allegue Pena; Manuel Rivas Gomez	Spain	1:31.08	
5	Telio Le Petit; Noe Martin	France	1:32.42	
6	Matija Preskar; Anže Urankar	Slovenia	1:33.23	
7	Panagiotis Antoniou; Christos Matsas	Greece	1:34.26	
8	Rahmi Kaan Karahan; Hasan Saraç	Turkey	1:35.23	
9	Antonis Kyriacou; Daniel Sirotin	Cyprus	1:35.61	

QF=Qualified for final, QS=Qualified for semifinal, X=Eliminated
