= Canoeing at the 2026 Mediterranean Games – Women's K-1 500 metres =

Women's canoe sprint K-1 500 metres at the 2026 Mediterranean Games
- Venue: Parco Cimino - Mar Piccolo
- Date: 21–23 August
- Competitors: 16 from 12 nations
- Winning time: 2:00.73

Medalists
gold medal	Ana Brito	Portugal
silver medal	Savvia Hadjicharalambous	Cyprus
bronze medal	Zsofi Horvat	Serbia

The women's canoe sprint K-1 500 metres at the 2026 Mediterranean Games in Taranto took place between 21 and 23 August at the Parco Cimino – Mar Piccolo.

== Schedule ==
All times are Italy time (UTC+02:00)

Date	Time	Round
Friday, 21 August 2026	9:35	Heats
Saturday, 22 August 2026	9:15	Semifinal
Sunday, 23 August 2026	11:55	Final

== Results ==
=== Heats ===
==== Heat 1 ====
Rank	Canoer	Country	Time	Notes
1	Savvia Hadjicharalambous	Cyprus	1:57.21	QF
2	Dunja Stanojev	Serbia	1:58.86	QF
3	Ana Šteblaj	Slovenia	1:59.54	QF
4	Giorgia Lacalamita	Italy	2:00.57	QS
5	Özge Nas Yıldız	Turkey	2:01.39	QS
6	Margot Maillet	France	2:03.74	QS
7	Sofia Pavli	Greece	2:10.64	QS
8	Sabiha Ben Othmane	Tunisia	2:15.35	qS

==== Heat 2 ====
Rank	Canoer	Country	Time	Notes
1	Ana Brito	Portugal	1:58.19	QF
2	Zsofi Horvat	Serbia	1:59.66	QF
3	Cristina Franco	Spain	2:01.02	QF
4	Isilsu Karvan	Turkey	2:06.82	QS
5	Theofania Svarna	Greece	2:11.39	QS
6	Aya Ferfad	Algeria	2:13.04	QS
7	Panagia Evangelou	Cyprus	2:15.94	QS
8	Fleta Decani	Kosovo	2:56.07	

=== Semifinal ===
Rank	Canoer	Country	Time	Notes
1	Margot Maillet	France	2:04.93	QF
2	Özge Nas Yıldız	Turkey	2:05.24	QF
3	Giorgia Lacalamita	Italy	2:07.29	QF
4	Isilsu Karvan	Turkey	2:10.03	
5	Sofia Pavli	Greece	2:12.65	
6	Theofania Svarna	Greece	2:16.38	
7	Aya Ferfad	Algeria	2:17.39	
8	Panagia Evangelou	Cyprus	2:18.48	
9	Sabiha Ben Othmane	Tunisia	2:28.98	

=== Final ===
Lane	Canoer	Country	Time	Notes
1st place, gold medalist(s)	Ana Brito	Portugal	2:00.73	
2nd place, silver medalist(s)	Savvia Hadjicharalambous	Cyprus	2:02.19	
3rd place, bronze medalist(s)	Zsofi Horvat	Serbia	2:02.59	
4	Dunja Stanojev	Serbia	2:02.87	
5	Cristina Franco	Spain	2:03.06	
6	Margot Maillet	France	2:04.40	
7	Giorgia Lacalamita	Italy	2:06.40	
8	Ana Šteblaj	Slovenia	2:06.92	
9	Özge Nas Yıldız	Turkey	2:12.30	

QF=Qualified for final, QS=Qualified for semifinal
