= Canoeing at the 2026 Mediterranean Games – Men's K-1 1000 metres =

Men's canoe sprint K-1 1000 metres at the 2026 Mediterranean Games
- Venue: Parco Cimino - Mar Piccolo
- Date: 21–23 August
- Competitors: 12 from 12 nations
- Winning time: 3:48.79

Medalists
gold medal	Bruno Brasileiro	Portugal
silver medal	Giacomo Rossi	Italy
bronze medal	Žarko Jakovljević	Serbia

The men's canoe sprint K-1 1000 metres at the 2026 Mediterranean Games in Taranto took place between 21 and 23 August at the Parco Cimino – Mar Piccolo.

== Schedule ==
All times are Italy time (UTC+02:00)

Date	Time	Round
Friday, 21 August 2026	10:00	Heats
Saturday, 22 August 2026	9:40	Semifinal
Sunday, 23 August 2026	11:20	Finals

== Results ==
=== Heats ===
==== Heat 1 ====
Rank	Canoer	Country	Time	Notes
1	Bruno Brasileiro	Portugal	3:43.86	QF
2	Žarko Jakovljević	Serbia	3:50.75	QS
3	Maxence Barouh	France	3:51.22	QS
4	Marcos Caballero Hernandez	Spain	3:51.44	QS
5	Antonis Kyriacou	Cyprus	4:06.47	QS
6	Vladyslav Dvulyat	Greece	4:07.50	QS
7	Hamza Ayman Ahmed	Egypt	4:17.12	QS

==== Heat 2 ====
Rank	Canoer	Country	Time	Notes
1	Giacomo Rossi	Italy	3:54.31	QF
2	Rahmi Kaan Karahan	Turkey	3:59.13	QS
3	Veljko Vještica	Serbia	4:04.51	QS
4	Daniel Sirotin	Cyprus	4:07.80	QS
5	Panagiotis Antoniou	Greece	4:20.23	QS
6	Farouk Dali	Tunisia	4:44.81	QS

==== Heat 3 ====
Rank	Canoer	Country	Time	Notes
1	Hasan Saraç	Turkey	3:57.41	QF
2	Tjas Til Kupsch	Slovenia	4:01.32	QS
3	Mohamed Ismail	Egypt	4:13.40	QS
4	Mehdi Berkani	Algeria	4:19.60	QS
5	Sleheddine Maknine	Tunisia	4:29.46	QS
6	Kron Balidemaj	Kosovo	4:44.40	QS

=== Semifinals ===
==== Semifinal 1 ====
Rank	Canoer	Country	Time	Notes
1	Žarko Jakovljević	Serbia	3:54.35	QF
2	Marcos Caballero Hernandez	Spain	3:55.84	QF
3	Veljko Vještica	Serbia	4:04.68	QF
4	Panagiotis Antoniou	Greece	4:07.60	FB
5	Vladyslav Dvulyat	Greece	4:11.60	FB
6	Mehdi Berkani	Algeria	4:16.20	FB
7	Mohamed Ismail	Egypt	4:28.16	FB
8	Kron Balidemaj	Kosovo	4:41.73	

==== Semifinal 2 ====
Rank	Canoer	Country	Time	Notes
1	Rahmi Kaan Karahan	Turkey	3:53.05	QF
2	Maxence Barouh	France	3:54.22	QF
3	Tjas Til Kupsch	Slovenia	3:57.66	QF
4	Daniel Sirotin	Cyprus	4:00.63	FB
5	Antonis Kyriacou	Cyprus	4:01.60	FB
6	Hamza Ayman Ahmed	Egypt	4:12.18	FB
7	Sleheddine Maknine	Tunisia	4:28.73	FB
8	Farouk Dali	Tunisia	4:35.18	fB

=== Finals ===
==== Final B ====
Lane	Canoer	Country	Time	Notes
1	Daniel Sirotin	Cyprus	3:59.92	
2	Panagiotis Antoniou	Greece	4:01.61	
3	Mohamed Ismail	Egypt	4:03.12	
4	Antonis Kyriacou	Cyprus	4:05.68	
5	Vladyslav Dvulyat	Greece	4:08.67	
6	Mehdi Berkani	Algeria	4:13.10	
7	Hamza Ayman Ahmed	Egypt	4:14.74	
8	Sleheddine Maknine	Tunisia	4:22.01	
9	Farouk Dali	Tunisia	4:30.80	

==== Final A ====
Lane	Canoer	Country	Time	Notes
1st place, gold medalist(s)	Bruno Brasileiro	Portugal	3:48.79	
2nd place, silver medalist(s)	Giacomo Rossi	Italy	3:51.54	
3rd place, bronze medalist(s)	Žarko Jakovljević	Serbia	3:51.75	
4	Hasan Saraç	Turkey	3:52.60	
5	Maxence Barouh	France	3:52.95	
6	Rahmi Kaan Karahan	Turkey	3:54.88	
7	Marcos Caballero Hernandez	Spain	3:55.87	
8	Tjas Til Kupsch	Slovenia	3:59.99	
9	Veljko Vještica	Serbia	4:10.88	

QF=Qualified for final, QS=Qualified for semifinal, FB=Qualified for Final B
