= Wrestling at the 2026 Mediterranean Games =

Wrestling competition

- Venue: PalaWojtyla, Martina Franca
- Dates: 22–25 August

The wrestling competition at the 2026 Mediterranean Games was held from 22 to 25 August at the PalaWojtyla in Martina Franca.

== Schedule ==
All times are local (UTC+2).

Date	Time	Event
22 August	10:30–13:00	Elimination rounds GR – 60–67–77–87–97 kg
22 August	17:00–18:00	Semi-final GR – 60–67–77–87–97 kg
23 August	10:30–13:00	Elimination rounds LL – 57-65-74-86-97-125 kg & Repechage GR – 60–67–77–87–97 kg
23 August	17:00–18:00	Semi-final LL – 57-65-74-86-97-125 kg
23 August	18:00–20:00	Finals GR – 60–67–77–87–97 kg
24 August	10:30–13:00	Elimination rounds LF – 50–53–57–62–68–76 kg & Repechage LL – 57-65-74-86-97-125 kg
24 August	17:00–18:00	Semi-final LF – 50–53–57–62–68–76 kg
24 August	18:00–20:00	Finals LL – 57-65-74-86-97-125 kg
25 August	18:00–19:00	Repechage LF – 50–53–57–62–68–76 kg
25 August	19:00–20:30	Finals LF – 50–53–57–62–68–76 kg

== Medal table ==
* Host nation (Italy)

Rank	Nation	Gold	Silver	Bronze	Total
1	Turkey	8	3	4	15
2	Egypt	2	2	3	7
3	Greece	2	1	1	4
4	Algeria	1	1	5	7
5	France	1	1	3	5
6	Albania	1	1	1	3
7	Croatia	1	1	0	2
7	Serbia	1	1	0	2
9	Italy*	0	2	4	6
10	North Macedonia	0	2	2	4
11	Spain	0	2	1	3
12	Syria	0	0	2	2
13	Morocco	0	0	1	1
13	Tunisia	0	0	1	1
Totals (14 entries)		17	17	28	62

== Medal summary ==
=== Men's freestyle ===
Event	Gold	Silver	Bronze
57 kg	Muhammet Karavuş; Turkey	Rassoul Galbouraev; France	Ibrahim Altabbaa; Syria
65 kg	Ahmet Duman; Turkey	Zelimkhan Abakarov; Albania	Oussama Laribi; Algeria Shehabeldin Mohamed; Egypt
74 kg	Islam Dudaev; Albania	Fati Vejseli; North Macedonia	Yasin Yeşil; Turkey Mohammad Mottaghinia; Spain
86 kg	Georgios Kougioumtsidis; Greece	İsmail Küçüksolak; Turkey	Ahmad Magomedov; North Macedonia Rakhim Magamadov; France
97 kg	Dauren Kurugliev; Greece	Redjep Hajdari; North Macedonia	Resul Gune; Turkey
125 kg	Hakan Büyükçıngıl; Turkey	Abdelrahman Sheyata; Egypt	Azamat Khosonov; Greece

=== Men's Greco-Roman ===
Event	Gold	Silver	Bronze
60 kg	Abdelkarim Fergat; Algeria	Mahmoud Farrag Saad; Egypt	Yazid Gharbi; Morocco Mhdasad Aldein Alosta; Syria
67 kg	Mohamed Hassan Abdelr; Egypt	Fayssal Benfredj; Algeria	Murat Fırat; Turkey Ardit Zeneli; Albania
77 kg	Yunus Emre Başar; Turkey	Antonio Kamenjašević; Croatia	Luca Dariozzi; Italy Moustafa Alameldin; Egypt
87 kg	Ivan Huklek; Croatia	Viktor Nemeš; Serbia	Bachir Sid Azara; Algeria Doğan Kaya; Turkey
97 kg	Aleksandr Komarov; Serbia	Nikoloz Kakhelashvili; Italy	Fadi Rouabah; Algeria

=== Women's freestyle ===
Event	Gold	Silver	Bronze
50 kg	Zehra Demirhan; Turkey	Maria Gkika; Greece	Emanuela Liuzzi; Italy Ibtissem Doudou; Algeria
53 kg	Zeynep Yetgil; Turkey	Carla Jaume; Spain	Cheima Chebila; Algeria Tatiana Debien; France
57 kg	Elvira Süleyman Kamaloğlu; Turkey	Lydia Pérez; Spain	Fabiana Rinella; Italy Veronika Konsevich; North Macedonia
62 kg	Améline Douarre; France	Ebru Dağbaşı; Turkey	Mawadda Hamdun; Egypt Immacolata Danise; Italy
68 kg	Nesrin Baş; Turkey	Laura Godino; Italy	Pauline Lecarpentier; France Zaineb Sghaier; Tunisia
76 kg	Samar Amer; Egypt	Kadriye Aksoy Koçak; Turkey	Enrica Rinaldi; Italy

== Participating nations ==
143 wrestlers from 19 countries:

1. Albania (7)
2. Algeria (14)
3. Croatia (4)
4. Cyprus (1)
5. Egypt (13)
6. Spain (7)
7. France (14)
8. Greece (13)
9. Italy (17)
10. Kosovo (3)
11. Lebanon (1)
12. Morocco (4)
13. North Macedonia (7)
14. Malta (1)
15. Portugal (2)
16. Serbia (7)
17. Syria (6)
18. Tunisia (5)
19. Turkey (17)
