= Badminton at the 2026 Mediterranean Games =

Badminton competition

- Venue: Palazzetto dello Sport
- Location: Francavilla Fontana
- Dates: 22–28 August
- Competitors: 72 from 15 nations

The badminton events at the 2026 Mediterranean Games were held from 22 to 28 August at the Palazzetto dello Sport in Francavilla Fontana.

The winners earned direct qualification for the 2028 Summer Olympics in Los Angeles.

== Medal summary ==
=== Medalists ===
Event	Gold	Silver	Bronze
Men's singles	Fabio Caponio; Italy	Aria Dinata; Croatia	Pablo Abián; Spain Giovanni Toti; Italy
Men's doubles	Turkey; Buğra Aktaş; Emre Sönmez	Algeria; Koceila Mammeri; Youcef Sabri Medel	France; Thibault Gardon; Tom Lalot Trescarte Slovenia; Miha Ivančič; Tadej Jelenc
Women's singles	Neslihan Arın; Turkey	Yasmine Hamza; Italy	Grammatoula Sotiriou; Greece Léonice Huet; France
Women's doubles	Turkey; Bengisu Erçetin; Nazlıcan İnci	France; Agathe Cuevas; Elsa Jacob	Greece; Theodora Lamprianidou; Eleni Moutevelidou Spain; Nikol Carulla; Carmen Jiménez
Mixed doubles	Turkey; Yasemen Bektaş; Emre Sönmez	France; Elsa Jacob; Natan Begga	Algeria; Tanina Mammeri; Koceila Mammeri Serbia; Anđela Vitman; Mihajlo Tomić

== Medal table ==
* Host nation (Italy)

Rank	Nation	Gold	Silver	Bronze	Total
1	Turkey	4	0	0	4
2	Italy*	1	1	1	3
3	France	0	2	2	4
4	Algeria	0	1	1	2
5	Croatia	0	1	0	1
6	Greece	0	0	2	2
6	Spain	0	0	2	2
8	Serbia	0	0	1	1
8	Slovenia	0	0	1	1
Totals (9 entries)		5	5	10	20
