= Wrestling at the 2026 Mediterranean Games – Men's Greco-Roman 67 kg =

Wrestling competitions

Men's Greco-Roman 67 kg at the 2026 Mediterranean Games
- Venue: PalaWojtyla
- Date: 22–23 August
- Competitors: 10 from 10 nations

Medalists
gold medal	Mohamed Hassan Abdelr	Egypt
silver medal	Fayssal Benfredj	Algeria
bronze medal	Murat Fırat	Turkey
bronze medal	Ardit Zeneli	Albania

The Men's Greco-Roman 67 kg competition of the wrestling events at the 2026 Mediterranean Games in Martina Franca, Italy, was held from 22 to 23 August at the PalaWojtyla.

== Results ==
Legend

- F — Won by fall

Round of 16
Miguel Loureiro dos Santos (POR)	0
Murat Fırat (TUR)	8
Fayssal Benfredj (ALG)	WO
Georgij Tibilov (SRB)

Quarterfinals
Yanis Guendez (FRA)	0
Murat Fırat (TUR)	3
Dominik Etlinger (CRO)	1
Mohamed Hassan Abdelr (EGY)	3
Ardit Zeneli (ALB)	11
Jacopo Sandron (ITA)	3
Fayssal Benfredj (ALG)	8
Stavros Ntounias (GRE)	2

Semifinals
Murat Fırat (TUR)	0
Mohamed Hassan Abdelr (EGY)	2
Ardit Zeneli (ALB)	3
Fayssal Benfredj (ALG)	5^{F}

Final
Mohamed Hassan Abdelr (EGY)	3
Fayssal Benfredj (ALG)	1

Bronze medals
Dominik Etlinger (CRO)	1
Murat Fırat (TUR)	5
Stavros Ntounias (GRE)	8
Ardit Zeneli (ALB)	9
