= Wrestling at the 2026 Mediterranean Games – Men's freestyle 65 kg =

Wrestling competitions

Men's Freestyle 65 kg at the 2026 Mediterranean Games
- Venue: PalaWojtyla
- Date: 23–24 August
- Competitors: 8 from 8 nations

Medalists
gold medal	Ahmet Duman	Turkey
silver medal	Zelimkhan Abakarov	Albania
bronze medal	Oussama Laribi	Algeria
bronze medal	Shehabeldin Mohamed	Egypt

The Men's Freestyle 65 kg competition of the wrestling events at the 2026 Mediterranean Games in Martina Franca, Italy, was held from 23 to 24 August at the PalaWojtyla.

== Results ==
Legend

- F — Won by fall

Quarterfinals		Semifinals		Final
Carlos Álvarez (ESP)	1
Ahmet Duman (TUR)	11	Ahmet Duman (TUR)	6
Daniele Gubbiotti (ITA)	2	Oussama Laribi (ALG)	4
Oussama Laribi (ALG)	7^{F}			Ahmet Duman (TUR)	4
Ahmad Dirki (SYR)	8			Zelimkhan Abakarov (ALB)	2
Besir Alili (MKD)	1	Ahmad Dirki (SYR)	2
Zelimkhan Abakarov (ALB)	3	Zelimkhan Abakarov (ALB)	6
Shehabeldin Mohamed (EGY)	0

Bronze medals
Carlos Álvarez (ESP)	3
Oussama Laribi (ALG)	14
Shehabeldin Mohamed (EGY)	5
Ahmad Dirki (SYR)	3
