= Sude Nur Aslan =

Turkish women's boxer (born 2007)

Personal information
- Nationality: Turkish
- Born: 1 January 2007 (age 19) Kırşehir, Turkey
- Weight: 75 kg (165 lb)

Boxing career
Medal record
Women's amateur boxing
Representing Turkey
Mediterranean Games
Bronze medal – third place	2026 Taranto	Middleweight

Sude Nur Aslan (born 1 January 2007) is a Turkish female boxer who competes in the middleweight (75 kg) division. She is a member of Fenerbahçe Boxing, and represents Turkey at international comprtitions.

== Sport career ==
Aslan started boxing after being discovered during athlete screenings held at schools in Kırşehir in 2019. She won championships in the youth and junior women's categories at the Turkish championships in 2024 and 2025.

She won a bronze medal i[n the 81 kg division at the 2024 IBA Youth World Championships held in Budva, Montenegro. She won the gold medal in the 75 kg division at the 2024 Youth World Cup, also held in Budva, in March 2025. She became the Turkish champion in the youth women's 75 kg category at the Hamdi Yıldırım U22, Youth, and Junior Women's Boxing Championships in Samsun in April.

She finished second in the 75 kg event at the 2026 Senior Women's Turkish Individual Boxing Championship Darıca, Kocaeli. She competed in the 75 kg event at the 2026 Mediterranean Games in Taranto, Italy, and won a bronze medal.

== Personal lihe ==
Born on 1 January 2007, Sude Nur Aslan is a native of Kırşehir, Turkey.
