= Wrestling at the 2026 Mediterranean Games – Women's freestyle 57 kg =

Wrestling competitions

Women's freestyle 57 kg at the 2026 Mediterranean Games
- Venue: PalaWojtyla
- Date: 24–25 August
- Competitors: 8 from 8 nations

Medalists
gold medal	Elvira Süleyman Kamaloğlu	Turkey
silver medal	Lydia Pérez	Spain
bronze medal	Fabiana Rinella	Italy
bronze medal	Veronika Konsevich	North Macedonia

The Women's Freestyle 57 kg competition of the wrestling events at the 2026 Mediterranean Games in Martina Franca, Italy, was held from 24 to 25 August at the PalaWojtyla.

== Results ==
Legend

- F — Won by fall

Quarterfinals		Semifinals		Final
Fabiana Rinella (ITA)	5
Céleste Sion (FRA)	0	Fabiana Rinella (ITA)	0
Elvira Süleyman Kamaloğlu (TUR)	8^{F}	Elvira Süleyman Kamaloğlu (TUR)	11^{F}
Chahd Jeljeli (TUN)	1			Elvira Süleyman Kamaloğlu (TUR)	4
Lydia Pérez (ESP)	4			Lydia Pérez (ESP)	0
Veronika Konsevich (MKD)	1	Lydia Pérez (ESP)	10
Milica Perović (SRB)	13^{F}	Milica Perović (SRB)	0
Achouak Tekouk (ALG)	2

Bronze medals
Chahd Jeljeli (TUN)	0
Fabiana Rinella (ITA)	6^{F}
Veronika Konsevich (MKD)	7
Milica Perović (SRB)	5
