= Wrestling at the 2026 Mediterranean Games – Women's freestyle 62 kg =

Wrestling competitions

Women's freestyle 62 kg at the 2026 Mediterranean Games
- Venue: PalaWojtyla
- Date: 24–25 August
- Competitors: 6 from 6 nations

Medalists
gold medal	Améline Douarre	France
silver medal	Ebru Dağbaşı	Turkey
bronze medal	Mouda Hamdoun	Egypt

The Women's freestyle 62 kg competition of the wrestling events at the 2026 Mediterranean Games in Martina Franca, Italy, was held from 24 to 25 August at the PalaWojtyla.

== Results ==
=== Elimination groups ===
==== Group A ====
Pos	Athlete	Pld	W	L	CP	TP
1	Ebru Dağbaşı (TUR)	2	2	0	6	10
2	Immacolata Danise (ITA)	3	1	2	4	10
3	Emilija Jakovljević (SRB)	1	0	1	2	6

Source: Taranto 2026

	Score		CP
Emilija Jakovljević (SRB)	1–4	Ebru Dağbaşı (TUR)	1–3 VPO1
Immacolata Danise (ITA)	7–5	Emilija Jakovljević (SRB)	3–1 VPO1
Ebru Dağbaşı (TUR)	6–3	Immacolata Danise (ITA)	3–1 VPO1

==== Group B ====
Pos	Athlete	Pld	W	L	CP	TP
1	Améline Douarre (FRA)	2	2	0	7	20
2	Mouda Hamdoun (EGY)	2	1	1	6	12
3	Nawel Bahloul (ALG)	2	0	2	0	0

Source: Taranto 2026

	Score		CP
Améline Douarre (FRA)	10–0	Nawel Bahloul (ALG)	4–0 VSU
Mouda Hamdoun (EGY)	2–10	Améline Douarre (FRA)	1–3 VPO1
Nawel Bahloul (ALG)	0–10 Fall	Mouda Hamdoun (EGY)	0–5 VFA

=== Knockout round ===
Semifinals
Ebru Dağbaşı (TUR)	3
Mouda Hamdoun (EGY)	3
Améline Douarre (FRA)	11
Immacolata Danise (ITA)	0

Final
Ebru Dağbaşı (TUR)	1
Améline Douarre (FRA)	3
Bronze medal
Mouda Hamdoun (EGY)	5^{F}
Immacolata Danise (ITA)	0
