= Wrestling at the 2026 Mediterranean Games – Men's Greco-Roman 87 kg =

Wrestling competitions

Men's Greco-Roman 87 kg at the 2026 Mediterranean Games
- Venue: PalaWojtyla
- Date: 22–23 August
- Competitors: 9 from 9 nations

Medalists
gold medal	Ivan Huklek	Croatia
silver medal	Viktor Nemeš	Serbia
bronze medal	Bachir Sid Azara	Algeria
bronze medal	Doğan Kaya	Turkey

The Men's Greco-Roman 87 kg competition of the wrestling events at the 2026 Mediterranean Games in Martina Franca, Italy, was held from 22 to 23 August at the PalaWojtyla.

== Results ==
Legend

- D — Disqualified
- F — Won by fall

Round of 16
Johnny Bur (FRA)	8
Mohamad Awarke (LBN)	0

Quarterfinals
Leon Rivalta (ITA)	10
Johnny Bur (FRA)	4
Bachir Sid Azara (ALG)	1
Ivan Huklek (CRO)	4^{F}
Mohamed Dyab (EGY)	1
Viktor Nemeš (SRB)	1
Doğan Kaya (TUR)	5
Ilias Pagkalidis (GRE)	1

Semifinals
Leon Rivalta (ITA)	3
Ivan Huklek (CRO)	8
Mohamed Dyab (EGY)	12
Doğan Kaya (TUR)	3

Final
Ivan Huklek (CRO)	5
Mohamed Dyab (EGY)	1^{D}

Bronze medals
Bachir Sid Azara (ALG)	4
Leon Rivalta (ITA)	1
Viktor Nemeš (SRB)	7
Doğan Kaya (TUR)	5
