= Tokat Gaziosmanpaşa University =

Public university in Tokat, Turkey

Coordinates: 40.3328108°N 36.4775228°E

- Tokat Gaziosmanpaşa Üniversitesi
- Type: Public University
- Established: 1992
- Rector: Prof. Fatih Yılmaz
- Students: +30,000
- Location: Tokat, Turkey
- Colors: Jagger and Pacific blue
- Sporting affiliations: Tokat Gaziosmanpaşa University Men's Basketball Team
- Mascot: Icon consisting of Gazi Osman Pasha's initials.
- Website: www.gop.edu.tr

University rankings

Regional – Overall
- QS Emerging Europe and Central Asia: 251-300 (2022)

Tokat Gaziosmanpaşa University (Turkish: Tokat Gaziosmanpaşa Üniversitesi) is a public university established in 1992 and primarily located in Tokat, Turkey. The university takes its name from the famous Turkish commander Gazi Osman Nuri Pasha, who was born in Tokat.

== Faculties ==
- Faculty of Agriculture
- Faculty of Arts and Sciences
- Faculty of Dentistry
- Faculty of Economics and Administrative Sciences
- Faculty of Education
- Faculty of Engineering and Architecture
- Faculty of Fine Arts
- Faculty of Health Sciences
- Faculty of Islamic Sciences
- Faculty of Law
- Faculty of Medicine
- Faculty of Pharmacy
- Faculty of Sport Sciences

== Graduate institutes ==
- Institute for Graduate Studies in Pure and Applied Sciences
- Institute of Social Sciences
- Institute of Health Sciences

== Vocational colleges of higher education ==
- Vocational College of Physical Education
- Vocational School of Health Services
- Vocational School of Foreign Languages
- Zile Dinçerler Vocational School of Tourism and Hotel Management
- Tokat Vocational College
- Almus Vocational College
- Artova Vocational College
- Erbaa Vocational College
- Niksar Vocational College
- Reşadiye Vocational College
- Turhal Vocational College
- Zile Vocational College
- Koyulhisar Vocational College
- Erbaa Vocational School of Health Services
- Turhal Vocational School of Health Services

== University governance ==
The present rector of Tokat Gaziosmanpasha University is Prof. Fatih Yılmaz. University has two vice Rectors. Names of vice Rectors are Prof. Mücahit Eğri and Prof. Rasim Koçyiğit.

== Notable alumni ==
- Nesrin Baş (born 2002), Turkish female sport wrestler
- Ebru Dağbaşı (born 2002), Turkish female sport wrestler
- Sibel Özkan (born 1988), Turkish femaşe weightlifter

== Gallery ==
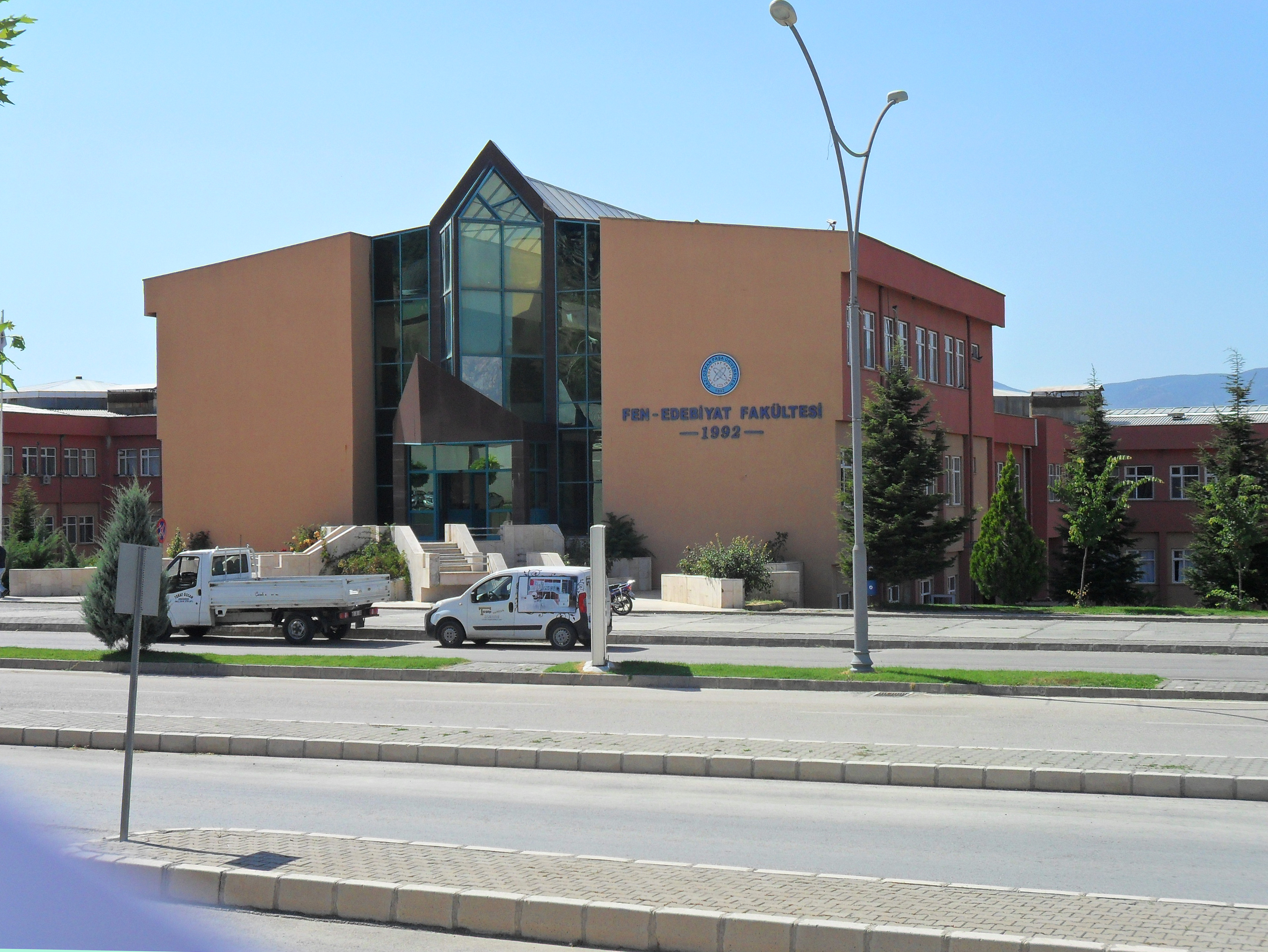
Faculty of Arts and Sciences

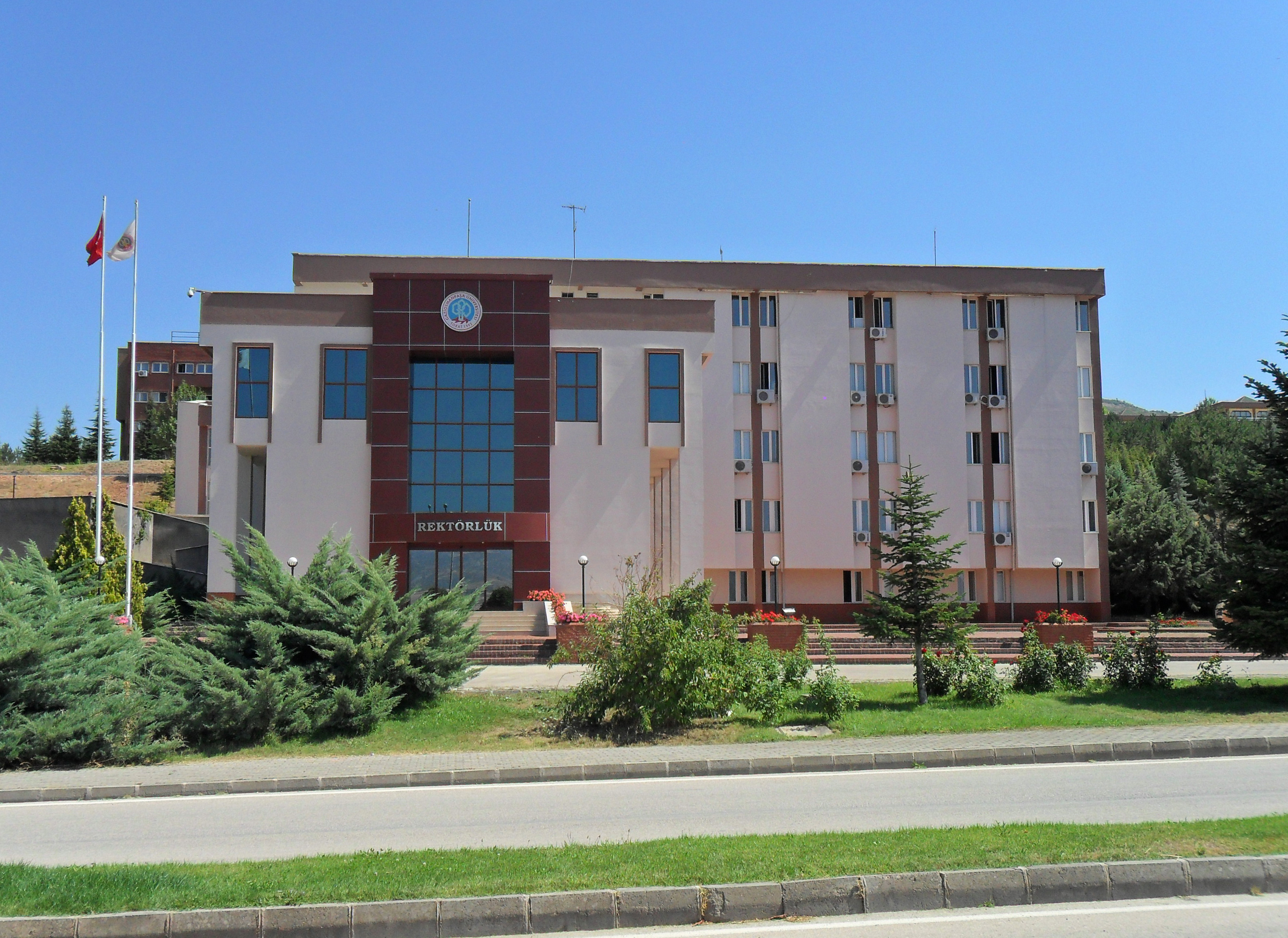
Rectorate

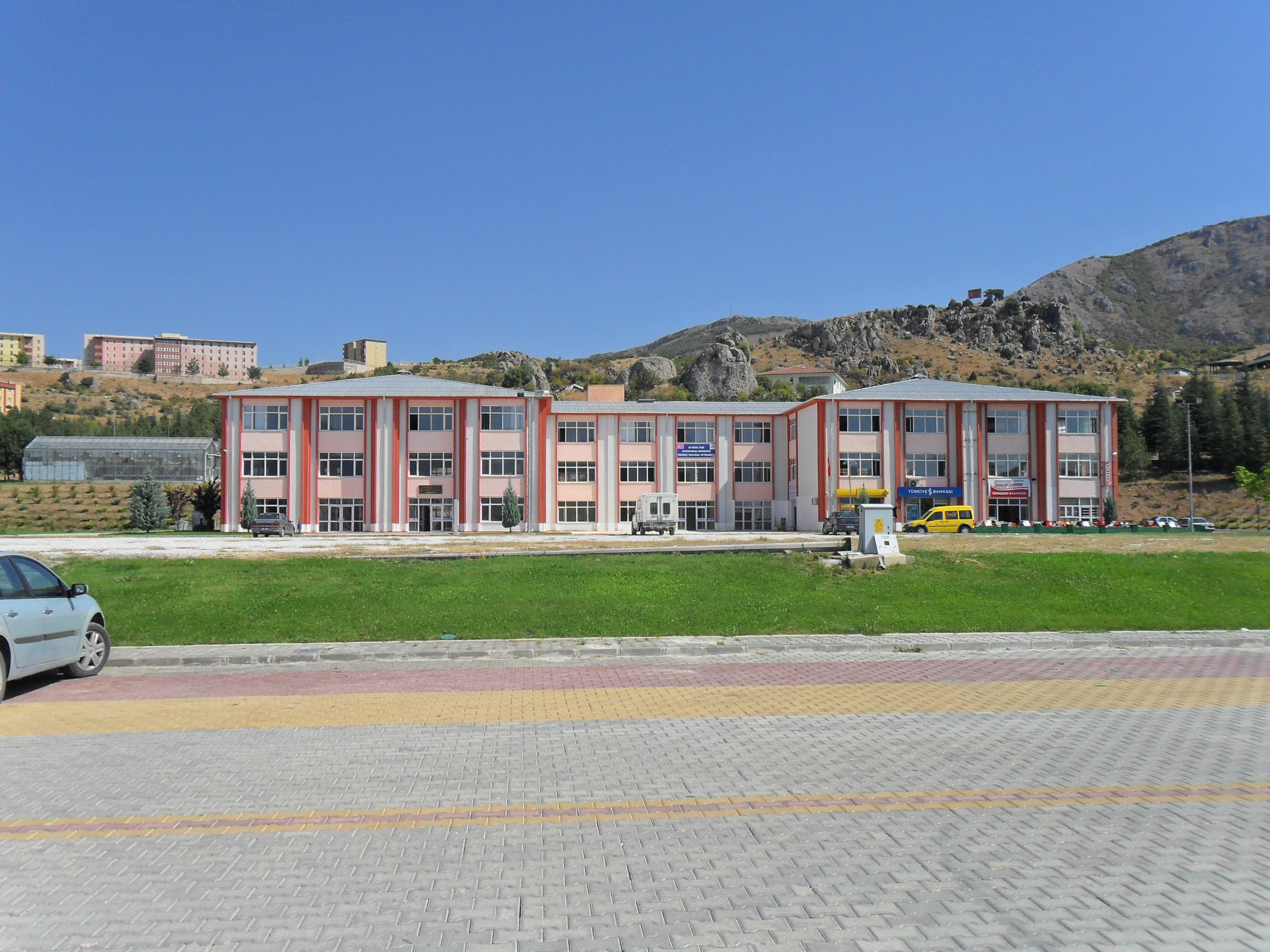
Dining halls
