= Boxing at the 2026 Mediterranean Games =

Boxing competition

- Venue: San Giorgio Ionico Sport Hall
- Dates: 22–27 August
- Competitors: 118 from 18 nations

The boxing event at the 2026 Mediterranean Games was held in San Giorgio Ionico, Italy, from 22 to 27 August 2026.

== Medal table ==
* Host nation (Italy)

Rank	Nation	Gold	Silver	Bronze	Total
1	Spain	4	2	0	6
2	Italy*	4	0	3	7
3	Morocco	2	1	3	6
4	France	1	3	5	9
5	Turkey	1	2	3	6
6	Croatia	1	0	1	2
7	Kosovo	1	0	0	1
8	Algeria	0	3	2	5
9	Serbia	0	2	4	6
10	Egypt	0	1	1	2
11	Bosnia and Herzegovina	0	0	1	1
11	Greece	0	0	1	1
11	Montenegro	0	0	1	1
11	North Macedonia	0	0	1	1
11	Tunisia	0	0	1	1
Totals (15 entries)		14	14	27	55

== Medalists ==
=== Men's events ===
Event	Gold	Silver	Bronze
Bantamweight (55 kg)	Rafael Lozano; Spain	Christopher Hippocrate; France	Amine Zanaz; Algeria
Bantamweight (55 kg)	Rafael Lozano; Spain	Christopher Hippocrate; France	Artur Nagapetyan; Serbia
Lightweight (60 kg)	Mehmethan Çınar; Turkey	Ewart Marín; Spain	Michele Baldassi; Italy
Lightweight (60 kg)	Mehmethan Çınar; Turkey	Ewart Marín; Spain	Alen Rustemovski; North Macedonia
Light welterweight (65 kg)	Soulaimane Samghouli; Morocco	Ismail Bekhsis; Algeria	Hugo Grau; France
Light welterweight (65 kg)	Soulaimane Samghouli; Morocco	Ismail Bekhsis; Algeria	Dmitrij Gorbenko; Serbia
Welterweight (70 kg)	Gabriele Guidi Rontani; Italy	Frank Martínez; Spain	Djamel Djemmal; France
Welterweight (70 kg)	Gabriele Guidi Rontani; Italy	Frank Martínez; Spain	Abdelhaq Nadir; Morocco
Light heavyweight (80 kg)	Pablo Coy; Spain	Mustapha Abdou; Algeria	Christian Sarsilli; Italy
Heavyweight (90 kg)	Enmanuel Reyes; Spain	Marko Pižurica; Serbia	Mohamed Abdelmoneim; Egypt
Heavyweight (90 kg)	Enmanuel Reyes; Spain	Marko Pižurica; Serbia	Soheb Bouafia; France
Super heavyweight (+90 kg)	Djamili-Dini Aboudou Moindze; France	Berat Acar; Turkey	Dylan Rajić; Bosnia and Herzegovina
Super heavyweight (+90 kg)	Djamili-Dini Aboudou Moindze; France	Berat Acar; Turkey	Marko Perković; Croatia

=== Women's events ===
Event	Gold	Silver	Bronze
Light flyweight (51 kg)	Laura Fuertes; Spain	Fatiha Mansouri; Algeria	Martina Vassallo; Italy
Light flyweight (51 kg)	Laura Fuertes; Spain	Fatiha Mansouri; Algeria	Yasmine Mouttaki; Morocco
Bantamweight (54 kg)	Sirine Charaabi; Italy	Widad Bertal; Morocco	Wassila Lkhadiri; France
Bantamweight (54 kg)	Sirine Charaabi; Italy	Widad Bertal; Morocco	Sara Ćirković; Serbia
Featherweight (57 kg)	Irma Testa; Italy	Amina Zidani; France	Bojana Gojković; Montenegro
Featherweight (57 kg)	Irma Testa; Italy	Amina Zidani; France	Ece Asude Ediz; Turkey
Lightweight (60 kg)	Donjeta Sadiku; Kosovo	Kristina Kuluhova; Serbia	Sthélyne Grosy; France
Lightweight (60 kg)	Donjeta Sadiku; Kosovo	Kristina Kuluhova; Serbia	Sofia Legaki; Greece
Welterweight (65 kg)	Sara Beram; Croatia	Sema Çalışkan; Turkey	Djouher Benane; Algeria
Welterweight (65 kg)	Sara Beram; Croatia	Sema Çalışkan; Turkey	Mounia Toutire; Morocco
Light middleweight (70 kg)	Saida Lahmidi; Morocco	Maëlys Richol; France	Nikolina Gajić; Serbia
Light middleweight (70 kg)	Saida Lahmidi; Morocco	Maëlys Richol; France	Dilara Sak; Turkey
Middleweight (75 kg)	Melissa Gemini; Italy	Nabila Aboelfead; Egypt	Molka Ben Mabrouk; Tunisia
Middleweight (75 kg)	Melissa Gemini; Italy	Nabila Aboelfead; Egypt	Sude Nur Aslan; Turkey

== External link ==
- 2026 Mediterranean Games - Boxing
- Boxing Schedule
- Results Book
