= Table tennis at the 2026 Mediterranean Games =

Table tennis competition

- Venue: Palazzetto Giovanni Paolo II
- Location: Massafra, Italy
- Dates: 26 August – 2 September

The table tennis at the 2026 Mediterranean Games was held in Massafra, Italy from 26 August to 2 September.

== Medal table ==
* Host nation (Italy)

Rank	Nation	Gold	Silver	Bronze	Total
1	Egypt	2	3	0	5
2	Italy*	1	1	1	3
3	Algeria	1	0	0	1
3	Turkey	1	0	0	1
5	Monaco	0	1	0	1
6	Serbia	0	0	2	2
7	France	0	0	1	1
7	Spain	0	0	1	1
Totals (8 entries)		5	5	5	15

== Medalists ==
Event	Gold	Silver	Bronze
Men's singles	Mehdi Bouloussa; Algeria	Youssef Ahmed; Egypt	Léo de Nodrest; France
Men's team	Italy; Matteo Mutti; John Oyebode; Andrea Puppo; Carlo Rossi	Egypt; Youseff Ahmed; Omar Assar; Omar El-Menshawi; Badr Kotb	Spain; Daniel Berzosa; Juan Pérez
Women's singles	Hana Goda; Egypt	Xiaoxin Yang; Monaco	Izabela Lupulesku; Serbia
Women's team	Egypt; Mariam Al-Hodaby; Hana Goda; Farah Abdelaziz; Dina Meshref	Italy; Nicole Arlia; Miriam Carnovale; Gaia Monfardini; Giorgia Piccolin	Serbia; Reka Bezeg; Izabela Lupulesku; Sabina Šurjan
Mixed doubles	Turkey; Abdullah Talha Yiğenler; Ece Haraç	Egypt; Omar Assar; Hana Goda	Italy; John Oyebode; Gaia Monfardini
