= Nikola Simić =

Nikola Simić may refer to:

- Nikola Simić (actor) (1934–2014), Serbian actor
- Nikola Simić (footballer, born 1897) (1897–1969), Serbian football player, manager and coach of the Yugoslav national
- Nikola Simić (footballer, born 1976), Croatian footballer
- Nikola Simić (footballer, born 1981), Serbian footballer
- Nikola Simić (footballer, born 1996), Serbian football goalkeeper
- Nikola Simić (footballer, born 2007), Serbian footballer
