= Ebru Dağbaşı =

Turkish wrestler (born 2002)

Personal information
- Nationality: Turkish
- Born: 15 July 2002 (age 24) Turhal, Tokat, Turkey
- Education: Tokat Gaziosmanpaşa University
- Height: 1.60 m (5 ft 3 in)
- Weight: 62 kg (137 lb)

Sport
- Country: Turkey
- Sport: Women's freestyle wrestling
- Event: 62 kg
Medal record
Women's freestyle wrestling
Representing Turkey
Mediterranean Games
Silver medal – second place	2026 Taranto	62 kg

Ebru Dağbaşı (born 15 July 2002) is a Turkish freestyle wrestler competing in the 62 kg division. She represents Turkey at international competitions.

== Sport career ==
Dağbaşı is a member of Ankara ASKİ Sports Club.

She won the silver medal in the 59 kg division at the 2022 European Juniors Championships held in Rome, Italy. She also secured a bronze medal in the 59 kg division at the 2022 World Junior Championships in Sofia, Bulgaria.

he won a bronze medal in the 59 kg division at the 2023 European U23 Championships in Bucharest, Romania.

She won a bronze medal in the 59 kg division at the 2025 European U23 in Tirana, Albania.

She competed at the 2006 Mediterranean Games in Taranto, Italy, and won the silver medal in the 62 kg division.

== Personal life ==
Ebru Dağbaşı was born in Turhal District of Tokat Province, northern Turkey, on 15 July 2002.

She studied at Tokat Gaziosmanpaşa University.
