= Algeria at the 2026 Mediterranean Games =

- IOC code: ALG
- NOC: Algerian Olympic Committee

in Taranto, Italy 21 August–3 September 2026
- Competitors: 268 in 27 sports
- Flag bearers (opening): Zohra Kehli & Mohamed Oualid Abiad
- Flag bearers (closing): Cylia Ouikene & Said Ameri
- Medals Ranked 9th: Gold 13 Silver 8 Bronze 19 Total 40

Mediterranean Games appearances (overview)
- 1967; 1971; 1975; 1979; 1983; 1987; 1991; 1993; 1997; 2001; 2005; 2009; 2013; 2018; 2022; 2026

Algeria competed at the 2026 Mediterranean Games in Taranto, Italy from 21 August to 3 September 2026 with delegation of 522 persons (268 athletes in 27 sports), including 165 men and 103 women.

The Algerian delegation concluded the 2026 Mediterranean Games, held in Taranto, Italy, with a total of 40 medals, including 13 gold, 8 silver and 19 bronze. This result placed Algeria ninth in the overall medal table. With 40 medals, Algeria achieved its best performance at a Mediterranean Games held outside Algerian territory. Only the 2022 edition, held in Oran, produced a higher medal tally for the Algerian delegation. On the final day of competition, Saïd Amari won the men's 10,000 metres. In wrestling, Mehdi Boulousa defeated Egypt's Youcef Abdelaziz 4–2 in the final. In the half marathon, Mohamed Seif Boukartaba won the silver medal.

Athletics was one of the main contributors to Algeria's medal tally. Djamel Sedjati won the 800 metres, while Yasser Triki won the triple jump. Saïd Amari added another gold medal with his victory in the 10,000 metres. Mohamed Seif Boukartaba also secured a silver medal in the half marathon. Gymnastics also contributed significantly to Algeria's performance through Kaylia Nemour. The Olympic champion won several titles during the competition, including the individual all-around, uneven bars and balance beam events. The Algeria under-21 football team won the football tournament after defeating Tunisia 2–0 in the final. Algeria completed the tournament unbeaten.

The Algerian delegation also won medals in several other disciplines. In Greco-Roman wrestling, Abdelkarim Fergat opened Algeria's medal account by defeating his Egyptian opponent 10–1. In 3×3 basketball, Algeria also reached the podium after defeating Turkey. Overall, the 19 bronze medals won across various disciplines reflected Algeria's presence in a wide range of finals and medal events. The Taranto Games therefore represented Algeria's second-best performance at the Mediterranean Games, behind its result at the 2022 Mediterranean Games in Oran.

== Medal table ==
Medal	Name	Sport	Event	Date
Gold	Abdelkarim Fergat	Wrestling	Men's Greco-Roman 60 kg	23 August
Gold	Messaoud Dris	Judo	Men's 73 kg	28 August
Gold	Men's football team: Mohammed El Koubi Mohamed Faiz Belgourai Issam Abdelhamid Naim Daniel Ilyès Mahdid Houssam Alla Eddine Abdelaziz Ben Ahmed Kohili Houssem Tarzout Moslem Anatouf Abdelmalek Kelalech Lahlou Akhrib Haithem Elkouacheur Walid Kourdi Salah Eddine Bouziani Youcef Izem Yasser Zitouni Abdelouahab Satta Mohamed Bouderbala	Football	Men's tournament	30 August
Gold	Djamel Sedjati	Athletics	Men's 800 metres	31 August
Gold	Kaylia Nemour	Artistic gymnastics	Women's individual all-around	1 September
Gold	Cylia Ouikene	Karate	Women's Kumite 50 kg	1 September
Gold	Kaylia Nemour	Artistic gymnastics	Women's uneven bars	2 September
Gold	Faris Touairi	Weightlifting	Men's 95 kg snatch	2 September
Gold	Aymen Touairi	Weightlifting	Men's 110 kg	2 September
Gold	Yasser Triki	Athletics	Men's triple jump	2 September
Gold	Kaylia Nemour	Artistic gymnastics	Women's balance beam	2 September
Gold	Mehdi Bouloussa (Fr)	Table tennis	Men's single	2 September
Gold	Said Ameri	Athletics	Men's 10000 metres	2 September
Silver	Fayssal Benfredj	Wrestling	Men's Greco-Roman 67 kg	23 August
Silver	Fatiha Mansouri	Boxing	Women's light flyweight	27 August
Silver	Ismail Bekhsis	Boxing	Men's light welterweight	27 August
Silver	Mustapha Abdou	Boxing	Men's light heavyweight	27 August
Silver	Koceila Mammeri; Youcef Sabri Medel	Badminton	Men's doubles	28 August
Silver	Nihed Benchadli	Rowing	Women's Lightweight Single Sculls	1 September
Silver	Anis Chott	Athletics	Men's 1500 metres	1 September
Silver	Mohamed Seif-Eddine Boukartaba	Athletics	Men's Half marathon	3 September
Bronze	Nadir Harbi	Taekwondo	Men's 58 kg	22 August
Bronze	Tanina Mammeri; Koceila Mammeri	Badminton	Mixed doubles	23 August
Bronze	Bachir Sid Azara	Wrestling	Men's Greco-Roman 87 kg	23 August
Bronze	Fadi Rouabah	Wrestling	Men's Greco-Roman 97 kg	23 August
Bronze	Oussama Laribi	Wrestling	Men's freestyle 65 kg	24 August
Bronze	Nour El-Houda Maïdi	Boules	Women's Raffa	25 August
Bronze	Ibtissem Doudou	Wrestling	Women's freestyle 50 kg	25 August
Bronze	Cheima Chebila	Wrestling	Women's freestyle 53 kg	25 August
Bronze	Djouher Benane	Boxing	Women's welterweight	26 August
Bronze	Amine Zanaz	Boxing	Men's bantamweight	26 August
Bronze	Louna Hamames-Moallic; Sihem Hamidi; Léna Khenoun; Djenna Laroui; Kaylia Nemour; Malek Rezagui	Artistic gymnastics	Women's team all-around	30 August
Bronze	Tarek Hocine	Athletics	Men's Long jump	30 August
Bronze	Men's handball team: Zohir Naim Hani Abderrafik Bounab Messaoud Berkous Chems Eddine Lakikza Mohamed Abderraouf Sadi Ahmed Anisse Mahdi Manis Makboul Mohamed Ali Bendiab Azziz Bouhal Salim Mezaza Mohamed Loucif Walid Abed Boumediene Abdel Ghani Allag Mohamed Merouane Bouziane Ramy Sidi Aissa	Handball	Men's tournament	31 August
Bronze	Men's 3x3 basketball team: Mohand Yahiatene Mehdi Qittane Abdelmalek Aouana Mehdi Bouhmama	3x3 basketball	Men's tournament	1 September
Bronze	Hocine Daikhi	Karate	Men's Kumie +84 kg	2 September
Bronze	Falleh Midoune	Karate	Men's Kumie -84 kg	2 September
Bronze	Faris Touairi	Weightlifting	Men's 95 kg Clean & Jerk	2 September
Bronze	Zahra Tatar	Athletics	Women's Hammer throw	2 September
Bronze	Omar Seraiche	Athletics	Men's 3000 metres steeplechase	2 September

Medals by sport
Sport	1st place, gold medalist(s)	2nd place, silver medalist(s)	3rd place, bronze medalist(s)	Total
Athletics	3	2	3	8
Badminton	0	1	1	2
3x3 basketball	0	0	1	1
Boules	0	0	1	1
Boxing	0	3	2	5
Football	1	0	0	1
Gymnastics	3	0	1	4
Handball	0	0	1	1
Judo	1	0	0	1
Karate	1	0	2	3
Rowing	0	1	0	1
Table tennis	1	0	0	1
Taekwondo	0	0	1	1
Weightlifting	2	0	1	3
Wrestling	1	1	5	7
Total	13	8	19	40

Medals by date
Day	Date	1st place, gold medalist(s)	2nd place, silver medalist(s)	3rd place, bronze medalist(s)	Total
1	22 August	0	0	1	1
2	23 August	1	1	3	5
3	24 August	0	0	1	1
4	25 August	0	0	3	3
5	26 August	0	0	2	2
6	27 August	0	3	0	3
7	28 August	1	1	0	2
8	29 August	0	0	0	0
9	30 August	1	0	2	3
10	31 August	1	0	1	2
11	1 September	2	2	1	5
12	2 September	7	0	5	12
13	3 September	0	1	0	1
Total		13	8	19	40

Medals by gender
Gender	1st place, gold medalist(s)	2nd place, silver medalist(s)	3rd place, bronze medalist(s)	Total	Percentage
Male	9	6	12	27	67.5%
Female	4	2	6	12	30%
Mixed	0	0	1	1	2.5%
Total	13	8	19	40	100%

Multiple medalists
Name	Sport	1st place, gold medalist(s)	2nd place, silver medalist(s)	3rd place, bronze medalist(s)	Total
Kaylia Nemour	Artistic gymnastics	3	0	1	4
Faris Touairi	Weightlifting	1	0	1	2
Koceila Mammeri	Badminton	0	1	1	2

== 3x3 basketball ==
Athletes	Event	Group matches				Quarterfinals	Semifinals	Final / BM	
Athletes	Event	Opposition Score	Opposition Score	Opposition Score	Rank	Opposition Score	Opposition Score	Opposition Score	Rank
Mohand Yahiatene; Mehdi Qittane; Abdelmalek Aouana; Mehdi Bouhmama	Men's Tournament	Cyprus; W 17-12	(Croatia) Croatia; W 20-19	(Slovenia) Slovenia; W 20-19	1 Q	(Portugal) Portugal; W 18-17	(Italy) Italy; L 13-15	(Turkey) Turkey; W 21-19	3rd place, bronze medalist(s)
Rania Oubibette; Khelia Boukhers; Yasmine Azzi; Maria Bendebka	Women's Tournament	(Cyprus) Cyprus; L 8-21	(Turkey) Turkey; L 13-20	(Tunisia) Tunisia; L 12-21	4	Did not advance			

== Artistic gymnastics ==
Men
Team

Key:

- F - Floor
- PH - Pommel horse
- R - Rings
- V - Vault
- PB - Parallel bars
- HB - Horizontal bar

Athlete	Event	Final							
Athlete	Event	Apparatus						Total	Rank
Athlete	Event	F	PH	R	V	PB	HB	Total	Rank
Ahmed-Riadh Aliouat	Team	11.500	10.200	—N/a	12.450	12.600	11.150	57.900	—N/a
Adam Cogat	Team	12.050	11.650	11.700	13.650	11.250	12.200	72.500	—N/a
H'mida Djaber	Team	—N/a		11.550	12.700	11.950	12.200	48.400	—N/a
Houssem Hamadouche	Team	12.450	11.250	12.350	13.450	12.200	12.350	74.050	—N/a
Youcef Semmani	Team	—N/a	12.950	12.450	—N/a			25.400	—N/a
Total	Team	36.000	35.850	36.500	39.800	36.750	37.400	222.300	8

Individual finals

Athlete	Event	Apparatus						Total	Rank
Athlete	Event	F	PH	R	V	PB	HB	Total	Rank
Houssem Hamadouche	All around	12.750	11.850	12.200	13.600	12.200	12.100	74.700	10
Adam Cogat	All around	13.350	10.100	12.250	13.600	11.050	12.000	72.350	13

Women
Team

Key:

- F - Floor
- V - Vault
- UB - Uneven bars
- BB - Balance beam

Athlete	Event	Final					
Athlete	Event	Apparatus				Total	Rank
Athlete	Event	F	V	UB	BB	Total	Rank
Kaylia Nemour	Team	13.400	14.000	13.950	14.450	55.800	—N/a
Djenna Laroui	Team	11.900	11.900	12.100	11.300	47.200	—N/a
Léna Khenoun	Team	11.400	—N/a	11.650	9.750	32.800	—N/a
Sihem Hamidi	Team	—N/a	12.400	10.350	—N/a	22.750	—N/a
Louna Hamames-Moallic	Team	12.350	12.950	—N/a	11.250	36.550	—N/a
Total	Team	37.650	39.350	37.700	37.000	151.700	3rd place, bronze medalist(s)

Individual finals

Athlete	Event	Apparatus				Total	Rank
Athlete	Event	F	V	UB	BB	Total	Rank
Kaylia Nemour	All around	13.600	13.800	15.650	14.700	57.750	1st place, gold medalist(s)
Djenna Laroui	All around	12.450	12.650	13.300	12.200	50.600	7
Sihem Hamidi	Vault	—N/a	12.600	—N/a		12.600	R1
Louna Hamames-Moallic	Vault	—N/a	12.500	—N/a		12.500	R2
Kaylia Nemour	Uneven bars	—N/a		15.500	—N/a	15.500	1st place, gold medalist(s)
Djenna Laroui	Uneven bars	—N/a		12.100	—N/a	12.100	R3
Kaylia Nemour	Balance beam	—N/a			13.300	13.300	1st place, gold medalist(s)
Kaylia Nemour	Floor	11.950	—N/a			11.950	7
Louna Hamames-Moallic	Floor	12.350	—N/a			12.350	R1

== Athletics (track and field) ==
Key

- Note–Ranks given for track events are within the athlete's heat only
- Q = Qualified for the next round
- q = Qualified for the next round as a fastest loser or, in field events, by position without achieving the qualifying target
- NR = National record
- N/A = Round not applicable for the event
- Bye = Athlete not required to compete in round

Track & road events
Men

Athlete	Event	Semifinal		Final	
Athlete	Event	Result	Rank	Result	Rank
Skander Djamil Athmani	200 m	20.80	5 Q	20.96	6
Abdennour Bendjema	400 m	45.87	7 q	45.78	8
Djamel Sedjati	800 m	1:46.25	1 Q	1:46.00	1st place, gold medalist(s)
Slimane Moula	800 m	1:46.78	6 Q	1:46.72	5
Anis Chott	1500 m	—N/a		3:43.19	2nd place, silver medalist(s)
Heithem Chenitef	1500 m	—N/a		3:48.50	12
Said Ameri	5000 m	—N/a		14:49.54	10

Women

Field events
Men

Athlete	Event	Qualification		Final	
Athlete	Event	Distance	Position	Distance	Position
Tarek Hocine	Long jump	—N/a		8.03 m PB	3rd place, bronze medalist(s)
Yasser Triki	Triple jump	—N/a		16.97 m	1st place, gold medalist(s)
Abdelmoutaleb Yagoub	Discus throw	—N/a		52.27 m	10

Women

== Boxing ==
Men

Athlete	Event	Round of 16	Quarterfinals	Semifinals	Final	
Athlete	Event	Opposition Result	Opposition Result	Opposition Result	Opposition Result	Rank
Amine Zanaz	Bantamweight	—N/a	Bensayar (MAR); W 3-2	Serrano (ESP); L 1-4	Did not advance	3rd place, bronze medalist(s)
Mohamed Walid Allaoui	Lightweight	Baldassi (ITA); L 1-4	Did not advance			
Ismail Bekhsis	Light welterweight	Fiore (ITA); W 3-2	Kanli (TUR); W 5-0	Grau (FRA); WO	Samghouli (MAR); L 2-3	2nd place, silver medalist(s)
Youcef Islam Yaich	Welterweight	—N/a	Bernad (ESP); L 0-5	Did not advance		
Mustapha Abdou	Light heavyweight	—N/a	Rafrafi (TUN); W 5-0	Tsamalidis (GRE); DQB	Coy (ESP); L 1-4	2nd place, silver medalist(s)

Women

Athlete	Event	Quarterfinals	Semifinals	Final	
Athlete	Event	Opposition Result	Opposition Result	Opposition Result	Rank
Fatiha Mansouri	Light flyweight	—N/a	Vassallo (ITA); W 5-0	Fuertes (ESP); L 1-4	2nd place, silver medalist(s)
Douaa Rouaz	Bantamweight	Bertal (MAR); L 0-5	Did not advance		
Milissa Hamda	Featherweight	Ediz (TUR); L 0-3	Did not advance		
Djouher Benane	Welterweight	Lukajic (SRB); W 5-0	Beram (CRO); L 0-5	Did not advance	3rd place, bronze medalist(s)
Ichrak Chaib	Lightweight	Grosy (FRA); L 0-5	Did not advance		

== Football ==
Summary

Key:

- A.E.T – After extra time.
- P – Match decided by penalty-shootout.

Team	Event	Group Stage					Semifinal	Final / BM
Team	Event	Opposition Score	Opposition Score	Opposition Score	Rank	Opposition Score	Opposition Score	Rank
Algeria Men's	Men's tournament	Kosovo; W 2-1	Italy; W 3-1	Albania; W 2-0	1 Q	Morocco; D 1-1	Tunisia; W 2-0	1st place, gold medalist(s)

== Handball ==
Summary

Key:

- A.E.T – After extra time.
- P – Match decided by penalty-shootout.

Team	Event	Group Stage						Semifinal	Final / BM	
Team	Event	Opposition Score	Opposition Score	Opposition Score	Opposition Score	Opposition Score	Rank	Opposition Score	Opposition Score	Rank
Algeria men's	Men's tournament	Cyprus; W 33-24	Greece; D 26-26	Tunisia; W 33-26	—N/a		2	Egypt; L 25-27	Portugal; W 36-33	3rd place, bronze medalist(s)
Algeria women's	Women's tournament	Kosovo; W 35-20	Italy; L 27-37	North Macedonia; W 37-23	Greece; L 24-35	Tunisia; W 21-26	2 Q	—N/a	Greece; L 25-29	4

== Wrestling ==
Key:

- WO – walkover
- VT (ranking points: 5–0 or 0–5) – Victory by fall.
- VB (ranking points: 5–0 or 0–5) – Victory by injury (VF for forfeit, VA for withdrawal or disqualification)
- PP (ranking points: 3–1 or 1–3) – Decision by points – the loser with technical points.
- PO (ranking points: 3–0 or 0–3) – Decision by points – the loser without technical points.
- ST (ranking points: 4–0 or 0–4) – Great superiority – the loser without technical points and a margin of victory of at least 8 (Greco-Roman) or 10 (freestyle) points.
- SP (ranking points: 4–1 or 1–4) – Technical superiority – the loser with technical points and a margin of victory of at least 8 (Greco-Roman) or 10 (freestyle) points.

Greco-Roman

Athlete	Event	Group Stage			Round of 16	Quarterfinal	Semifinal	Repechage	Final / BM	
Athlete	Event	Opposition Result	Opposition Result	Rank	Opposition Result	Opposition Result	Opposition Result	Opposition Result	Opposition Result	Rank
Abdelkarim Fergat	Men's 60 kg	—N/a			Bye	Pucher (ITA); W (7-0)	Gharbi (MAR); W (3-1)	Bye	Saad (EGY); W (10-1)	1st place, gold medalist(s)
Fayssal Benfredj	Men's 67 kg	—N/a			Tibilov (SRB); WO	Ntounias (GRE); W (8-2)	Zeneli (ALB); W VT (5-3)	Bye	Abdelr (TUN); L (1-3)	2nd place, silver medalist(s)
Chawki Doulache	Men's 77 kg	—N/a			Alobeid (SYR); W (8-0)	Başar (TUR); L (2-7)	—N/a	Kupi (ALB); L (3-4)	—N/a	
Bachir Sid Azara	Men's 87 kg	—N/a			Bye	Huklek (CRO); W VT (4-1)	—N/a		Rivalta (ITA); W (4-1)	3rd place, bronze medalist(s)
Fadi Rouabah	Men's 97 kg	Kakhelashvili (ITA); W (3-1)	Gabr (EGY); L (1-2)	2	—N/a		Komarov (SRB); L (1-3)	—N/a	Kesidis (GRE); W (6-1)	3rd place, bronze medalist(s)

Freestyle
Men

Athlete	Event	Group Stage			Round of 16	Quarterfinal	Semifinal	Repechage	Final / BM	
Athlete	Event	Opposition Result	Opposition Result	Rank	Opposition Result	Opposition Result	Opposition Result	Opposition Result	Opposition Result	Rank
Oussama Laribi	Men's 65 kg	—N/a				Gubbiotti (ITA); W VT (7-2)	Duman (TUR); L (4-6)	—N/a	Álvarez (ESP); W (14-3)	3rd place, bronze medalist(s)
Fateh Benferdjallah	Men's 86 kg	—N/a			Niccolini (ITA); L (8-17)	—N/a				
Laid Khelif	Men's 125 kg	Sheyata (EGY); L (2-8)	Büyükçıngıl (TUR); L (0-10)	3	—N/a					

Women

Athlete	Event	Group Stage			Round of 16	Quarterfinal	Semifinal	Repechage	Final / BM	
Athlete	Event	Opposition Result	Opposition Result	Rank	Opposition Result	Opposition Result	Opposition Result	Opposition Result	Opposition Result	Rank
Ibtissem Doudou	Women's 50 kg	—N/a				Gkika (GRE); L (0-4)	—N/a		Ahmed (EGY); W (3-2)	3rd place, bronze medalist(s)
Cheima Chebila	Women's 53 kg	—N/a				Jaume (ESP); L (0-7)	—N/a		Ech-Chabki (MAR); W (6-1)	3rd place, bronze medalist(s)
Achouak Tekouk	Women's 57 kg	—N/a				Perović (SRB); L (2-13)	—N/a			
Nawel Bahloul	Women's 62 kg	Douarre (FRA); L (0-10)	Hamdoun (EGY); L (0-10)	3	—N/a					
Yasmine Bouregba	Women's 76 kg	Aksoy (TUR); L (0-4)	Rinaldi (ITA); L (1-3)	3	—N/a					
