= Ece Asude Ediz =

Turkish women's boxer (born 2003)

Personal information
- Nationality: Turkish
- Born: 27 February 2003 (age 23) Sakarya, Turkey
- Weight: 57 kg (126 lb)

Boxing career
Medal record
Women's amateur boxing
Representing Turkey
Mediterranean Games
Bronze medal – third place	2026 Taranto	Featherweight

Ece Asude Ediz (born 27 February 2003) is a Turkish female boxer who competes in the featherweight (57 kg) division.

== Personal life and early years ==
Ece Asude Ediz is a native of Sakarya, Turkey born on 27 February 2003.

Ediz, weighing 80 kg (180 lb), started boxing sport in 2017 for the purpose of losing weight with the support of her amateur boxer father. In February 2019, she became Turkish champion in the 80 kg division, and was admitted to the national team. In May 2019, she won the European champion title at the EUBC Junior European Boxing Championships in Galați, Romania.

Later, she took the bronze medal in the European championship in the junior girls category. After losing weight, she reached down 57 kg (126 lb), the featherweight division. She has many Turkish champion titles.

== Boxing career ==
Ediz is a member of Sakarya Metropolitan Municipality Sports Club.

She competed at the 2024 European U23 Championships held in Sofia, Bulgaria, where she was eliminated in the quarterfinals.

In March 2025, she won the bronze medal at the 76th International Boxing Tournament Strandja in Sofia, Bulgaria.

She took part at the 2025 Islamic Solidarity Games in Riyadh, Saudi Arabia. She lost her first match, in the quarterfinals, and was eliminated.
