= Volleyball at the 2026 Mediterranean Games – Men's tournament =

Men's Volleyball at the 2026 Mediterranean Games
- Venue: Palamazzola Sport Hall; PalaPentassuglia
- Location: (Italy) Taranto and Brindisi
- Dates: 20 – 30 August
- Nations: 11

Medalists
gold medal	France (3rd title)
silver medal	Greece
bronze medal	Italy

The men's volleyball tournament at the 2026 Mediterranean Games took place between 20 and 30 August at the Palamazzola Sport Hall and PalaPentassuglia in Taranto and Brindisi, Italy, respectively.

== Participating teams ==
- Algeria
- Egypt
- France
- Greece
- Italy (host)
- Kosovo
- Portugal
- Serbia
- Spain
- Tunisia
- Turkey

== Preliminary round ==
All times are local (UTC+2).

=== Group A ===
Pos	Team	Pld	W	L	Pts	SW	SL	SR	SPW	SPL	SPR	Qualification
1	Italy	5	5	0	15	15	2	7.500	427	356	1.199	Final round
2	France	5	4	1	12	12	4	3.000	396	352	1.125	Final round
3	Tunisia	5	3	2	8	10	8	1.250	417	388	1.075	
4	Serbia	5	2	3	6	8	11	0.727	428	443	0.966	
5	Portugal	5	1	4	2	4	11	0.364	364	436	0.835	
6	Algeria	5	0	5	2	5	15	0.333	415	472	0.879	

Source: Taranto 2026

Date	Time		Score		Set 1	Set 2	Set 3	Set 4	Set 5	Total	Report
20 Aug	14:00	Tunisia	3–0	Algeria	25–17	25–21	25–14			75–52	P2 P3
20 Aug	18:00	Italy	3–1	Portugal	25–19	19–25	25–20	25–15		94–79	P2 P3
21 Aug	12:00	France	3–0	Serbia	25–22	25–21	25–10			75–53	P2 P3
22 Aug	14:00	Portugal	3–2	Algeria	18–25	25–22	25–27	25–19	18–16	111–109	P2 P3
22 Aug	20:00	Tunisia	1–3	Italy	25–20	19–25	20–25	19–25		83–95	P2 P3
23 Aug	14:00	France	3–0	Portugal	33–31	25–19	25–17			83–67	P2 P3
23 Aug	20:00	Serbia	2–3	Tunisia	36–34	22–25	25–19	16–25	16–18	115–121	P2 P3
24 Aug	12:00	Algeria	1–3	France	23–25	30–32	25–20	16–25		94–102	P2 P3
24 Aug	20:00	Italy	3–0	Serbia	25–19	38–36	25–21			88–76	P2 P3
25 Aug	11:00	Portugal	0–3	Serbia	23–25	19–25	14–25			56–75	P2 P3
25 Aug	17:00	France	3–0	Tunisia	25–21	25–20	25–22			75–63	P2 P3
25 Aug	20:00	Italy	3–0	Algeria	25–16	25–19	25–22			75–57	P2 P3
28 Aug	11:00	Algeria	2–3	Serbia	19–25	25–23	21–25	25–21	13–15	103–109	P2 P3
28 Aug	14:00	Tunisia	3–0	Portugal	25–11	25–21	25–19			75–51	P2 P3
28 Aug	20:00	Italy	3–0	France	25–21	25–17	25–23			75–61	P2 P3

=== Group B ===
Pos	Team	Pld	W	L	Pts	SW	SL	SR	SPW	SPL	SPR	Qualification
1	Turkey	4	4	0	11	12	4	3.000	384	335	1.146	Final round
2	Greece	4	3	1	9	9	4	2.250	321	275	1.167	Final round
3	Spain	4	2	2	6	8	6	1.333	343	310	1.106	
4	Egypt	4	1	3	3	4	9	0.444	272	295	0.922	
5	Kosovo	4	0	4	1	2	12	0.167	229	334	0.686	

Source: Taranto 2026

Date	Time		Score		Set 1	Set 2	Set 3	Set 4	Set 5	Total	Report
20 Aug	12:00	Kosovo	0–3	Greece	13–25	13–25	15–25			41–75	P2 P3
20 Aug	15:00	Spain	3–0	Egypt	25–13	25–23	25–15			75–51	P2 P3
22 Aug	17:00	Kosovo	0–3	Spain	15–25	19–25	15–25			49–75	P2 P3
23 Aug	17:00	Egypt	3–0	Kosovo	25–12	25–19	25–17			75–48	P2 P3
24 Aug	15:00	Greece	3–1	Spain	28–30	25–19	25–19	29–27		107–95	P2 P3
24 Aug	18:00	Egypt	1–3	Turkey	25–22	23–25	17–25	17–25		82–97	P2 P3
25 Aug	14:00	Turkey	3–2	Kosovo	21–25	23–25	25–15	25–16	15–10	109–91	P2 P3
26 Aug	11:00	Greece	3–0	Egypt	25–22	25–21	25–21			75–64	P2 P3
27 Aug	20:00	Turkey	3–0	Greece	25–21	25–20	25–23			75–64	P2 P3
28 Aug	17:00	Spain	1–3	Turkey	24–26	26–24	26–28	22–25		98–103	P2 P3

== Final round ==
=== Championship bracket ===
Semi-finals
29 August
Italy	2
Greece	3
29 August
Turkey	2
France	3

Final
30 August
Greece	0
France	3
Third place
30 August
Italy	3
Turkey	2

==== Semifinals ====
Date	Time		Score		Set 1	Set 2	Set 3	Set 4	Set 5	Total	Report
29 Aug	17:00	Turkey	2–3	France	21–25	25–23	18–25	25–23	10–15	99–111	P2 P3
29 Aug	20:00	Italy	2–3	Greece	25–23	23–25	29–31	27–25	9–15	113–119	P2 P3

==== Third place game ====
Date	Time		Score		Set 1	Set 2	Set 3	Set 4	Set 5	Total	Report
30 Aug	14:00	Italy	3–2	Turkey	25–19	24–26	25–18	23–25	15–10	112–98	P2 P3

==== Final ====
Date	Time		Score		Set 1	Set 2	Set 3	Set 4	Set 5	Total	Report
30 Aug	20:00	Greece	0–3	France	18–25	20–25	15–25			53–75	P2 P3

== Final standings ==
Rank	Team
1st place, gold medalist(s)	France
2nd place, silver medalist(s)	Greece
3rd place, bronze medalist(s)	Italy
4	Turkey
5	Tunisia
6	Spain
7	Serbia
8	Egypt
9	Portugal
10	Kosovo
11	Algeria

== See also ==
- Volleyball at the Mediterranean Games
- Volleyball at the 2026 Mediterranean Games – Women's tournament
