= Fadi Rouabah =

Algerian Greco-Roman wrestler

Personal information
- Nationality: Algerian
- Born: 27 February 2001 (age 25) Ras El Oued, Algeria

Sport
- Country: Algeria
- Sport: Greco-Roman wrestling

Fadi Rouabah (born 27 February 2001) is an Algerian Greco-Roman wrestler. He competed in the men's 97kg event at the 2024 Summer Olympics, where he lost in the Round of 16 to Arvi Savolainen.
