= Swimming at the 2026 Mediterranean Games =

- Venue: Stadio del nuoto Torre d'Ayala
- Dates: 22–25 August

The swimming competitions at the 2026 Mediterranean Games was held from 22 to 25 August at the Stadio del nuoto Torre d'Ayala in Taranto.

== Schedule ==
H	Heats	F	Final

M = Morning session (starting at 10:00), E = Evening session (starting at 18:00)

Men
Date →	Sat 22		Sun 23		Mon 24		Tue 25	
Event ↓	M	E	M	E	M	E	M	E
50 m freestyle							H	F
100 m freestyle					H	F		
200 m freestyle			H	F				
400 m freestyle	H	F						
800 m freestyle			H	F				
1500 m freestyle							H	F
50 m backstroke			H	F				
100 m backstroke							H	F
200 m backstroke	H	F						
50 m breaststroke					H	F		
100 m breaststroke	H	F						
200 m breaststroke			H	F				
50 m butterfly	H	F						
100 m butterfly			H	F				
200 m butterfly							H	F
200 m individual medley							H	F
400 m individual medley					H	F		

Women
Date →	Sat 22		Sun 23		Mon 24		Tue 25	
Event ↓	M	E	M	E	M	E	M	E
50 m freestyle							H	F
100 m freestyle					H	F		
200 m freestyle			H	F				
400 m freestyle	H	F						
800 m freestyle					H	F		
1500 m freestyle		F						
50 m backstroke			H	F				
100 m backstroke							H	F
200 m backstroke	H	F						
50 m breaststroke					H	F		
100 m breaststroke	H	F						
200 m breaststroke			H	F				
50 m butterfly	H	F						
100 m butterfly			H	F				
200 m butterfly							H	F
200 m individual medley								F
400 m individual medley						F		

Mixed
Date →	Sat 22		Sun 23		Mon 24		Tue 25	
Event ↓	M	E	M	E	M	E	M	E
4 × 100 m medley relay			H	F				

== Medal summary ==
=== Men's events ===
Event	Gold		Silver		Bronze	
50 m freestyle	Giovanni Guatti; Italy	21.96	Lorenzo Ballarati; Italy	22.00	Luca Cvetko; Croatia	22.16
100 m freestyle	Toni Dragoja; Croatia	48.77	Vili Sivec; Croatia	49.19	Andreas Vazaios; Greece	49.37
200 m freestyle	Jacopo Barbotti; Italy	1:47.53	Ahmet Mete Boylu; Turkey	1:47.59	Dimitrios Markos; Greece	1:47.92
400 m freestyle	Dimitrios Markos; Greece	3:47.07	Alessandro Ragaini; Italy	3:49.02	Ahmed Jaouadi; Tunisia	3:49.13
800 m freestyle	Luca De Tullio; Italy	7:46.61; GR	Dimitrios Markos; Greece	7:55.05	Ahmed Jaouadi; Tunisia	7:55.30
1500 m freestyle	Matteo Diodato; Italy	15:06.27	Cristóbal Vargas; Spain	15:07.37	Ivan Giovannoni; Italy	15:08.01
50 m backstroke	Apostolos Christou; Greece	24.74	Francesco Lazzari; Italy	25.12	Nikola Miljenić; Croatia	25.28
100 m backstroke	Apostolos Christou; Greece	52.34; GR	Francesco Lazzari; Italy	54.28	Evangelos Makrygiannis; Greece	54.54
200 m backstroke	Apostolos Siskos; Greece	1:55.95	Matteo Venini; Italy	1:57.28	Mohamed Yassine Ben Abbes; Tunisia	1:59.43
50 m breaststroke	Emre Sakçı; Turkey	27.24	Gabriele Mancini; Italy	27.26	Nusrat Allahverdi; Turkey	27.39
100 m breaststroke	Gabriele Mancini; Italy	59.94; GR	Christian Mantegazza; Italy	1:00.40	Joaquín Pardo; Spain	1:00.58
200 m breaststroke	Doruk Yoğurtçuoğlu; Turkey	2:10.79	Christian Mantegazza; Italy	2:11.10	Filip Mujan; Croatia	2:11.14; NR
50 m butterfly	Abdelrahman Sameh; Egypt	23.18; GR	Lorenzo Gargani; Italy	23.35	Stergios Bilas; Greece	23.37
100 m butterfly	Alberto Razzetti; Italy	52.11	Edoardo Valsecchi; Italy	52.21	Youssef Ramadan; Egypt	52.22
200 m butterfly	Alberto Razzetti; Italy	1:55.29; GR	Andrea Camozzi; Italy	1:57.29	Polat Uzer Turnalı; Turkey	1:57.54
200 m individual medley	Simone Spedacci; Italy	1:57.70; GR	Berke Saka; Turkey	1:58.66	Jacopo Barbotti; Italy	1:59.28
400 m individual medley	Alberto Razzetti; Italy	4:11.99	Daniil Giourtzidis; Greece	4:18.28	Emanuele Potenza; Italy	4:19.03

=== Women's events ===
Event	Gold		Silver		Bronze	
50 m freestyle	Kalia Antoniou; Cyprus	24.92	Elena Capretta; Italy	25.02	Agata Maria Ambler; Italy	25.12
100 m freestyle	Kalia Antoniou; Cyprus	54.60	Chiara Tarantino; Italy	54.67	Ainhoa Campabadal; Spain	55.40
200 m freestyle	Ainhoa Campabadal; Spain	1:57.90	Anna Chiara Mascolo; Italy	1:58.53	Francisca Martins; Portugal	1:58.54
400 m freestyle	Francisca Martins; Portugal	4:09.00	Bianca Nannucci; Italy	4:11.61	Antonietta Cesarano; Italy	4:13.17
800 m freestyle	Noemi Cesarano; Italy	8:29.65	Artemis Vasilaki; Greece	8:30.02	Francisca Martins; Portugal	8:30.33
1500 m freestyle	Noemi Cesarano; Italy	16:08.39; GR	Artemis Vasilaki; Greece	16:22.15	Azzurra Sbaragli; Italy	16:30.57
50 m backstroke	Costanza Cocconcelli; Italy	28.03	Martina Biasoli; Italy	28.24	Tamara Frías; Spain	28.44
100 m backstroke	Camila Rebelo; Portugal	1:00.37; GR	Federica Toma; Italy	1:00.74	Martina Biasoli; Italy	1:01.12
200 m backstroke	Camila Rebelo; Portugal	2:08.88	Federica Toma; Italy	2:11.62	Sudem Denizli; Turkey	2:13.13
50 m breaststroke	Lisa Angiolini; Italy	30.64	Ana Rodrigues; Portugal	31.01	Irene Mati; Italy	31.34
100 m breaststroke	Benedetta Pilato; Italy	1:05.82; GR	Lisa Angiolini; Italy	1:06.55	Tina Čelik; Slovenia	1:07.58
200 m breaststroke	Lisa Angiolini; Italy	2:24.27; GR	Ana Blažević; Croatia	2.27:63	Francesca Zucca; Italy	2.28:46
50 m butterfly	Anna Ntountounaki; Greece	26.11	Viola Scotto di Carlo; Italy	26.29	Farida Osman; Egypt	26.32
100 m butterfly	Anna Ntountounaki; Greece	58.17	Georgia Damasioti; Greece	58.49	Paola Borrelli; Italy	59.13
200 m butterfly	Paola Borrelli; Italy	2:08.47	Georgia Damasioti; Greece	2:09.73	Paula González; Spain	2:11.10
200 m individual medley	Sara Franceschi; Italy	2:11.22	Chiara Della Corte; Italy	2:11.65	Nikoletta Pavlopoulou; Greece	2:12.69
400 m individual medley	Giada Alzetta; Italy	4:39.05; GR	Anna Pirovano; Italy	4:47.62	Paula González; Spain	4:48.68

=== Mixed events ===
Event	Gold		Silver		Bronze	
4 × 100 m medley	Italy; Francesco Lazzari (53.91); Gabriele Mancini (59.49); Costanza Cocconcelli (58.21); Chiara Tarantino (54.05); Federica Toma^{[a]} Elena Capretta^{[a]} Lorenzo Ballarati^{[a]}	3:45.66; GR	Greece; Apostolos Christou (52.79); Nikoletta Pavlopoulou (1:08.06); Anna Ntountounaki (58.35); Stergios Bilas (48.69); Evangelos Makrygiannis^{[a]} Andromachi Tasakou^{[a]} Andreas Vazaios^{[a]}	3:47.89	Portugal; Camila Rebelo (1:01.06); Gabriel Lopes (1:01.33); Vasco Morgado (53.04); Francisca Martins (54.77); Ricardo Santos^{[a]} Ana Rodrigues^{[a]} Inês Henriques^{[a]}	3:50.20 NR

^{a} Swimmers who participated in the heats only and received medals.

=== Medal table ===
* Host nation (Italy)

Rank	Nation	Gold	Silver	Bronze	Total
1	Italy*	19	22	10	51
2	Greece	6	7	5	18
3	Portugal	3	1	3	7
4	Turkey	2	2	3	7
5	Cyprus	2	0	0	2
6	Croatia	1	2	3	6
7	Spain	1	1	5	7
8	Egypt	1	0	2	3
9	Tunisia	0	0	3	3
10	Slovenia	0	0	1	1
Totals (10 entries)		35	35	35	105
