= Croatia at the 2026 Mediterranean Games =

- IOC code: CRO
- NOC: Olympic Committee of Croatia
- Competitors: 111 in 22 sports
- Flag bearers: Nives Jelovica & Ivan Šapina
- Medals Ranked 12th: Gold 6 Silver 18 Bronze 15 Total 39

Mediterranean Games appearances (overview)
- 1993; 1997; 2001; 2005; 2009; 2013; 2018; 2022; 2026

Other related appearances
- Yugoslavia (1951–1991)

Croatia competed at the 2026 Mediterranean Games in Taranto, Italy from 21 August to 3 September 2026, with 111 participants in 22 sports, winning 39 medals. This were the most successful Games for Croatia regarding medal number.

== Medals by sport ==
Sport	Gold	Silver	Bronze	Total
Judo	2	0	2	4
Swimming	1	2	3	6
Athletics	1	1	4	6
Wrestling	1	1	0	2
Boxing	1	0	1	2
Boules	0	5	0	5
Taekwondo	0	3	2	5
Karate	0	2	1	3
Badminton	0	1	0	1
Canoeing	0	1	0	1
Rowing	0	1	0	1
Shooting	0	1	0	1
Finswimming	0	0	2	2
Totals (13 entries)	6	18	15	39

== Medalists ==
Medal	Name	Sport	Event	Date
Gold	Ivan Huklek	Wrestling	Men's 87 kg	23 August
Gold	Toni Dragoja	Swimming	Men's 100 m freestyle	24 August
Gold	Sara Beram	Boxing	Women's welterweight	27 August
Gold	Ana Viktorija Puljiz	Judo	Women's 57 kg	28 August
Gold	Helena Vuković	Judo	Women's +78 kg	29 August
Gold	Nina Vuković	Athletics	Women's 800m	31 August
Silver	Josip Teskera	Taekwondo	Men's − 58 kg	22 August
Silver	Sofija Hinić	Taekwondo	Women's − 49 kg	22 August
Silver	Vanessa Tot	Canoeing	Women's C-1 200 m	23 August
Silver	Ana Blažević	Swimming	Women's 200 m breaststroke	23 August
Silver	Ivan Šapina	Taekwondo	Men's + 80 kg	23 August
Silver	Antonio Kamenjašević	Wrestling	Men's 77 kg	23 August
Silver	Vili Sivec	Swimming	Men's 100 m freestyle	24 August
Silver	Duje Pirić; Luka Zure	Boules	Men's raffa doubles	25 August
Silver	Neda Čorić; Ana Juginović	Boules	Women's raffa doubles	25 August
Silver	Ana Juginović	Boules	Women's raffa single	25 August
Silver	Luka Zure	Boules	Men's raffa single	25 August
Silver	Marino Miličević	Boules	Men's lyonnaise progressive shooting	25 August
Silver	Aria Dinata	Badminton	Men's singles	26 August
Silver	Miran Maričić	Shooting	Men's 10 m air rifle	28 August
Silver	Filip Pravdica	Athletics	Men's long jump	30 August
Silver	Goran Mahmutović; Josipa Jurković	Rowing	Mixed double sculls	1 September
Silver	Boran Berak	Karate	Men's - 67 kg	1 September
Silver	Anđelo Kvesić	Karate	Men's + 84 kg	2 September
Bronze	Nikola Miljenić	Swimming	Men's 50 m backstroke	23 August
Bronze	Filip Mujan	Swimming	Men's 200 m breaststroke	23 August
Bronze	Marko Golubić	Taekwondo	Men's − 68 kg	23 August
Bronze	Leon Hrgota	Taekwondo	Men's − 80 kg	24 August
Bronze	Luka Cvetko	Swimming	Men's 50 m freestyle	25 August
Bronze	Marko Petrović	Boxing	Men's super heavyweight	26 August
Bronze	Filip Strikinac	Finswimming	Men's 100 m surface	26 August
Bronze	Dora Bassi	Finswimming	Women's 100 m surface	27 August
Bronze	Iva Oberan	Judo	Women's 63 kg	29 August
Bronze	Lara Cvjetko	Judo	Women's 70 kg	29 August
Bronze	Matija Gregurić	Athletics	Men's hammer throw	30 August
Bronze	Marino Bloudek	Athletics	Men's 800m	31 August
Bronze	Ema Sgardelli	Karate	Women's - 50 kg	1 September
Bronze	Sara Kolak	Athletics	Women's javelin throw	1 September
Bronze	Matea Parlov Koštro	Athletics	Women's marathon	3 September

== 3x3 basketball ==
Summary

Athlete	Event	Group stage				Quarterfinal	Semifinal	Final / BM / Pl.	
Athlete	Event	Opposition Score	Opposition Score	Opposition Score	Rank	Opposition Score	Opposition Score	Opposition Score	Rank
Marko Malekinušić; Jakov Jacović; Pavao Turić	Men's tournament	Slovenia W 18–12	Algeria L 19–20	Cyprus W 19–8	2	Turkey L 16–18	Did not advance		
Elena Peričić; Ivana Mamić; Jelena Brkičić; Andrea Stanković	Women's tournament	France L 9–21	Slovenia L 12–15	—N/a	3	Did not advance			

=== Men's tournament ===
Group A

Pos	Team	Pld	W	L	PF	PA	PD	Qualification
1	Algeria	3	3	0	57	50	+7	Quarterfinals
2	Croatia	3	2	1	56	40	+16	Quarterfinals
3	Slovenia	3	1	2	49	49	0	
4	Cyprus	3	0	3	31	54	−23	

Source: Taranto 2026
Rules for classification: 1) Wins; 2) Head-to-head record; 3) Points scored.

29 August
10:30

Report

Croatia	18–12	Slovenia

Giardini Peripato, Taranto

29 August
18:25

Report

Algeria	20–19	Croatia

Giardini Peripato, Taranto

30 August
10:35

Report

Croatia	19–8	Cyprus

Giardini Peripato, Taranto

Championship bracket

31 August
21:00

Report

Turkey	18–16	Croatia

Giardini Peripato, Taranto

=== Women's tournament ===
Group B

Pos	Team	Pld	W	L	PF	PA	PD	Qualification
1	France	2	2	0	42	27	+15	Quarterfinals
2	Slovenia	2	1	1	33	33	0	Quarterfinals
3	Croatia	2	0	2	21	36	−15	

Source: Taranto 2026
Rules for classification: 1) Wins; 2) Head-to-head record; 3) Points scored.

29 August
20:40

Report

France	21–9	Croatia

Giardini Peripato, Taranto

30 August
19:15

Report

France	21–18	Slovenia

Giardini Peripato, Taranto

== Archery ==
Men

Athlete	Event	Ranking round		Round of 64	Round of 32	Round of 16	Quarterfinals	Semifinals	Final / BM	
Athlete	Event	Score	Seed	Opposition Score	Opposition Score	Opposition Score	Opposition Score	Opposition Score	Opposition Score	Rank
Alen Remar	Individual	622	17	Bye	Kylan Hepp (FRA) W 6–0	Andres Temino Mediel (ESP) L 0–6	Did not advance			

== Athletics ==
Men
Track & road events

Athlete	Event	Heat		Final	
Athlete	Event	Result	Rank	Result	Rank
Marino Bloudek	800m	1:46.33	2 Q	1.46.58	3rd place, bronze medalist(s)
Nino Jambrešić	1500m	—N/a		3:44.59	9

Field events

Athlete	Event	Final	
Athlete	Event	Result	Rank
Matija Gregurić	Hammer throw	76.03 SB	3rd place, bronze medalist(s)
Filip Pravdica	Long jump	8.14	2nd place, silver medalist(s)

Women
Track & road events

Athlete	Event	Heat		Final	
Athlete	Event	Result	Rank	Result	Rank
Veronika Drljačić	200m	28.57	13	Did not advance	
Veronika Drljačić	400m	51.80 SB	1 Q	51.64 SB	5
Nina Vuković	800m	—N/a		1:59.63	1st place, gold medalist(s)
Mia Wild	100m Hurdles	14.30	7 q	13.42	6
Natalija Svenda	400m Hurdles	57.50	5 Q	57.38	5
Matea Parlov Koštro	Marathon	—N/a		1:11:58	3rd place, bronze medalist(s)

Field events

Athlete	Event	Final	
Athlete	Event	Result	Rank
Marija Tolj	Discus throw	58.23	4
Sara Kolak	Javelin throw	62.64 SB	3rd place, bronze medalist(s)
Jana Koščak	High jump	1.75	10

== Badminton ==
Athlete	Event	Round of 32	Round of 16	Quarter-final	Semi-final	Final / BM	
Athlete	Event	Opposition Score	Opposition Score	Opposition Score	Opposition Score	Opposition Score	Rank
Aria Dinata	Men's singles	Bye	Haxhiu (KOS); W 2–0	Ezzat (EGY); W 2–0	Toti (ITA); W 2–0	Caponio (ITA); L 0–2	2nd place, silver medalist(s)
Jelena Buchberger	Women's singles	Bye	Keka (KOS); W 2–0	Hamza (ITA); L 1–2	Did not advance		
Aria Dinata; Jelena Buchberger	Mixed double	Bye	Begga / Jacob (FRA); L 0–2	Did not advance			

== Boules ==
Lyonnaise

Athlete	Event	Heats				Semifinals	Final / BM	
Athlete	Event	Heat 1	Heat 2	Total	Rank	Opposition Score	Opposition Score	Rank
Marin Čubela	Men's precision throw	2	22	24	8	Did not advance		
Nives Jelovica	Women's precision throw	10	3	13	9	Did not advance		
Marino Miličević	Men's progressive shooting	47	46	93	2 Q	Verganti (ITA); W 46-43	Marsens (FRA); L 54-57	2nd place, silver medalist(s)
Ria Vojković	Women's progressive shooting	29	27	56	4 Q	Grolaez (FRA); L 34-38	Gamba (ITA); L 29-31	4

Raffa

Athlete	Event	Preliminary round			Semifinals	Final / BM	
Athlete	Event	Opposition Score	Opposition Score	Rank	Opposition Score	Opposition Score	Rank
Luka Zure	Men's raffa single	Frisoni (SMR); W 11-2	Nanni (ITA); W 10-5	1	Corbihan (FRA); W 8-7	Frisoni (SMR); L 3-8	2nd place, silver medalist(s)
Ana Juginović	Women's raffa single	Accasto (FRA); W 6-5	Maidi (ALG); L 3-9	1	Paoletti (SMR); W 9-3	Crescenzi / Picchio (ITA); L 4-7	2nd place, silver medalist(s)

Athlete	Event	Group stage			Qualification playoff			Semifinals	Final / BM	
Athlete	Event	Opposition Score	Opposition Score	Rank	Opposition Score	Opposition Score	Rank	Opposition Score	Opposition Score	Rank
Duje Pirić; Luka Zure	Men's doubles	Boran / Kaplan (TUR); W 9-6	Dall'Olmo / Frisoni (SMR); L 4-6	2	Corbihan / Roualt (FRA); W 5-0	Hamel / Zekiri (ALG); W 4-3	1	Nanni / Viscusi (ITA); W 6-5	Dall'Olmo / Frisoni (SMR); L 6-7	2nd place, silver medalist(s)
Neda Čorić; Ana Juginović	Women's doubles	Accasto / Esparron (FRA); W 7-6	Crescenzi / Picchio (ITA); L 5-6	2	—N/a			Dabboussi / Zekri (TUN); W 8-5	Crescenzi / Picchio (ITA); L 8-9	2nd place, silver medalist(s)

== Boxing ==
Men

Athlete	Event	Quarterfinals	Semifinals	Final	
Athlete	Event	Opposition Result	Opposition Result	Opposition Result	Rank
Zvonimir Rebolj	Heavyweight	Bouafia (FRA); L 0-5	Did not advance		
Marko Petrović	Super heavyweight	Aboudou Moindze (FRA); L 0-5	Did not advance		3rd place, bronze medalist(s)

Women

Athlete	Event	Quarterfinals	Semifinals	Final	
Athlete	Event	Opposition Result	Opposition Result	Opposition Result	Rank
Sara Beram	Welterweight	Khalifi (TUN); W 5-0	Benane (ALG); W 5-0	Caliskan (TUR); W 5-0	1st place, gold medalist(s)

== Canoeing ==
Athlete	Event	Heats		Semifinals		Final	
Athlete	Event	Time	Rank	Time	Rank	Time	Rank
Vanessa Tot	Women's C-1 200 m	—N/a				48.04	2nd place, silver medalist(s)

== Fencing ==
Athlete	Event	Group Stage						Round of 32	Round of 16	Quarterfinal	Semifinal/ BM	Final	
Athlete	Event	Opposition Score	Opposition Score	Opposition Score	Opposition Score	Opposition Score	Rank	Opposition Score	Opposition Score	Opposition Score	Opposition Score	Opposition Score	Rank
Vedran Markota	Men's épee	Theodoropoulos (GRE); W 4-2	Talib (LBA); W 5-1	Piatti (ITA); L 3-5	El-Sayed (EGY); L 2-5	Bundaleski (MKD); W 5-2	2	Mohammedi (ALG); L 13-15	Did not advance				
Borna Špoljar	Men's foil	Roger (FRA); L 2-5	Lombardi (ITA); L 1-5	Ćuk (SRB); W 5-3	Kontochristopoulos (GRE); L 3-5	—N/a	=4	—N/a	Spichiger (FRA); W 15-6	Did not advance			
Dorja Blažić	Women's foil	Aye (FRA); W 5-4	Mecherek (TUN); W 5-3	Palumbo (ITA); L 4-5	Tucker (ESP); L 3-5	—N/a	3	—N/a	Kontochristopoulou (GRE); L 13-15	Did not advance			

== Finswimming ==
Men

Athlete	Event	Heat		Final	
Athlete	Event	Time	Rank	Time	Rank
Filip Strikinac	50 m apnoea	15.65	12	Did not advance	
Mihael Šestak	50 m apnoea	15.94	13	Did not advance	
Mihael Šestak	100 m surface	39.22	13	Did not advance	
Filip Strikinac	100 m surface	36.58	3 q	35.82	3rd place, bronze medalist(s)
Marko Krce Rabar	100 m bi-fins	45.12	9	Did not advance	
Marko Krce Rabar	200 m bi-fins	1:41.26	5 q	1:36.90	4

Women

Athlete	Event	Heat		Final	
Athlete	Event	Time	Rank	Time	Rank
Dora Bassi	50 m apnoea	16.93	4 q	16.83	4
Dora Bassi	100 m surface	41.80	6 q	40.60	3rd place, bronze medalist(s)
Barbara Pustahija	50 m bi-fins	23.47	10	Did not advance	
Gloria Galić	50 m bi-fins	23.18	7 q	23.21	7
Gloria Galić	100 m bi-fins	50.80	9	Did not advance	
Barbara Pustahija	100 m bi-fins	50.76	8 q	50.64	8
Barbara Pustahija	200 m bi-fins	1:57.92	12	Did not advance	

Mixed

Athlete	Event	Final	
Athlete	Event	Time	Rank
Marko Krce Rabar; Barbara Pustahija; Filip Strikinac; Gloria Galić	4x50 m bi-fins	1:23.64	5
Filip Strikinac; Barbara Pustahija; Mihael Šestak; Dora Bassi	4x100 m surface	-	DSQ

== Gymnastic Artistic ==
Men
Team

Key:

- F - Floor
- PH - Pommel horse
- R - Rings
- V - Vault
- PB - Parallel bars
- HB - Horizontal bar

Athlete	Event	Qualification			Final		
Athlete	Event	Points	Total	Rank	Points	Total	Rank
Marko Sambolec	Pommel Horse	13.250	13.250	11	Did not advance		
Mateo Žugec	Pommel Horse	13.450	13.450	=7 Q	12.150	12.150	8

Women
Team

Key:

- F - Floor
- V - Vault
- UB - Uneven bars
- BB - Balance beam

Athlete	Event	Qualification						Final					
Athlete	Event	Apparatus				Total	Rank	Apparatus				Total	Rank
Athlete	Event	F	V	UB	BB	Total	Rank	F	V	UB	BB	Total	Rank
Christina Zwicker	All around	11.550	11.550	9.550	11.850	44.500	20 Q	11.100	11.450	11.650	10.700	44.900	17
Tina Zelčić	Balance beam	-	-	-	11.450	11.450	19	Did not advance					
Antea Šikić Kaučić	Floor	12.800	-	-	-	12.800	7 Q	11.500	-	-	-	11.500	8

== Judo ==
Men

Athlete	Event	Round of 16	Quarterfinals	Semifinals	Repechage 1	Repechage 2	Final / BM	
Athlete	Event	Opposition Result	Opposition Result	Opposition Result	Opposition Result	Opposition Result	Opposition Result	Rank
Dani Klacar	Men's 66 kg	Jorgic (SRB); W Penalty (100-0)	Nieto Chinarro (ESP); L Waza-ari (0-10)	Did not advance	Bye	Boushita (MAR); W Yuko (1-0)	Renard (FRA); L Yuko (0-2)	5
Robert Klacar	Men's 73 kg	Jorgic (SRB); W Ippon (101-0)	Doukkali (MAR); W Ippon (1-100)	Did not advance	Bye	Gjakova (KOS); L Penalty (1-101)	Did not advance	
Dominik Družeta	Men's 90 kg	Miletic (BIH); L Ippon (0-101)	Did not advance					
Mikita Sviryd	Men's +100 kg	Bye	Vračar (SRB); W Yuko (1-0)	Tataroglu (TUR); L Penalty (0-100)	—N/a		Hussein (EGY); L Ippon (1-101)	5

Women

Athlete	Event	Round of 16	Quarterfinals	Semifinals	Repechage 1	Repechage 2	Final / BM	
Athlete	Event	Opposition Result	Opposition Result	Opposition Result	Opposition Result	Opposition Result	Opposition Result	Rank
Ana Viktorija Puljiz	Women's 57 kg	Bye	Samardzic (BIH); W Ippon (100-0)	Loxha (KOS); W Waza-ari (10-1)	—N/a		Perišić (SRB); W Ippon (1-0)	1st place, gold medalist(s)
Iva Oberan	Women's 63 kg	Bye	Borsas (FRA); L Waza-ari (1-10)	Did not advance	Jmour (TUN); W Ippon (101-0)	Yildiz (TUR); W Yuko (3-0)	Vasquez Fernandez (ESP); W Ippon (100-0)	3rd place, bronze medalist(s)
Lara Cvjetko	Women's 70 kg	Bye	Samardžić (BIH); W Yuko (1-0)	Teltsidou (GRE); L Ippon (0-100)	Bye		Darbes Takam (FRA); W Penalty (101-0)	3rd place, bronze medalist(s)
Petrunjela Pavić	Women's 78 kg	Bye	Stjepanovic (SRB); W Yuko (1-0)	Lobnik (SLO); L Ippon (0-100)	Bye		Bouvier (FRA); L Waza-ari (1-101)	5
Helena Vuković	Women's +78 kg	Bye	Janjić (SLO); W Ippon (100-0)	Mienandi-Lahou (FRA); W Ippon (100-0)	—N/a		Tavano (ITA); W Ippon (100-0)	1st place, gold medalist(s)

Mixed

Athlete	Event	Round of 16	Quarterfinals	Semifinals	Repechage 1	Repechage 2	Final / BM	
Athlete	Event	Opposition Result	Opposition Result	Opposition Result	Opposition Result	Opposition Result	Opposition Result	Rank
Dani Klacar; Robert Klacar; Dominik Družeta; Mikita Sviryd; Ana Viktorija Puljiz; Iva Oberan; Lara Cvjetko; Petrunjela Pavić; Helena Vuković	Mixed Team	Bye	Turkey; W 4-1	Did not advance	Bye	Spain; W 4-3	Slovenia; L 3-4	5

== Karate ==
Kumite
Men

Athlete	Event	Round of 32	Round of 16	Quarterfinals	Semifinals	Repechage1	Repechage2	Final	
Athlete	Event	Opposition Result	Opposition Result	Opposition Result	Opposition Result	Opposition Result	Opposition Result	Opposition Result	Rank
Boran Berak	Men's - 67 kg	Loizides (CYP); W 3-2	Ozer (TUR); W 3-2	Dulović (MNE); W 2-0	Oubaya (MAR); W 3-2	—N/a		Belistojanoski (MKD); L 0-6	2nd place, silver medalist(s)
Dino Šimunec	Men's - 75 kg	—N/a	Cizo (FRA); L 2-4	Did not advance		Zaid (ALG); L 2-10	Did not advance		
Ivan Kvesić	Men's - 84 kg	—N/a	Badawy (EGY); L 2-4	Did not advance					
Anđelo Kvesić	Men's + 84 kg	—N/a	Jovović (MNE); W 5-4	Daikhi (ALG); W HANTEI	Pakashtica (ALB); W 8-0	—N/a		Mahmoud (EGY); L 3-4	2nd place, silver medalist(s)

Women

Athlete	Event	Round of 16	Quarterfinals	Semifinals	Repechage	Final	
Athlete	Event	Opposition Result	Opposition Result	Opposition Result	Opposition Result	Opposition Result	Rank
Ema Sgardelli	Women's - 50 kg	Perfetto (ITA); L 0-6	Did not advance		Asfoura (SYR); W 8-0	Pappa (GRE); W 8-0	3rd place, bronze medalist(s)
Mia Greta Zorko	Women's - 61 kg	Tolba (EGY); L 1-4	Did not advance		Mangiacarpa (ITA); L 7-8	Did not advance	
Sadea Bećirović	Women's - 68 kg	Katsika (GRE); W 2-0	Nieto Mejias (ESP); W 5-2	Semararo (ITA); L 2-3	—N/a	Eltemur (TUR); L 3-4	5
Nikolina Golombos	Women's + 68 kg	Zibret (SLO); L 3-4	Did not advance				

== Padel ==
Women

Athlete	Event	Round of 32	Round of 16	Quarterfinals	Semifinals	Final / BM	
Athlete	Event	Opposition Score	Opposition Score	Opposition Score	Opposition Score	Opposition Score	Rank
Karolina Balog; Lea Jurković	Women's pairs	Mirković/ Nikolić (SRB) W 2-0	Rodriguez/ Velasco Postiguillo (ESP) L 0-2	Did not advance			

== Roller Marathon ==
Athlete	Event	Final	
Athlete	Event	Time	Rank
Marko Dolić	Men's	-	DNF
Marta Tomšić	Women's	-	DNF

== Rowing ==
Men

Athlete	Event	Semifinals		Final	
Athlete	Event	Time	Rank	Time	Rank
Goran Mahmutović	Men's single sculls	7:16.62	3 fB	7:59.05	4

Women

Athlete	Event	Semifinals		Final	
Athlete	Event	Time	Rank	Time	Rank
Josipa Jurković	Women's single sculls	7:52.54	2 FA	8:28.17	5

Mixed

Athlete	Event	Preliminary		Final	
Athlete	Event	Time	Rank	Time	Rank
Goran Mahmutović; Josipa Jurković	Mixed double sculls	7:29.90	3 FA	7:03.32	2nd place, silver medalist(s)

== Sailing ==
Athlete	Event	Race											Net points	Final rank
Athlete	Event	1	2	3	4	5	6	7	8	9	10	11	Net points	Final rank
Lovre Bakotić	Men's ILCA 7	14	16	7	13	12	17	14	13	3	1	~~20~~	110	12
Josip Tafra	Men's ILCA 7	2	~~18~~	16	10	5	10	17	17	17	3	2	99	9

== Shooting ==
Rifle & pistol
Men

Athlete	Event	Qualification		Final	
Athlete	Event	Points	Rank	Points	Rank
Miran Maričić	Men's 10 m air rifle	629.0	5 Q	249	2nd place, silver medalist(s)
Darko Tomašević	Men's 10 m air rifle	620.0	18	Did not advance	

Women

Athlete	Event	Qualification		Final	
Athlete	Event	Points	Rank	Points	Rank
Anamarija Turk	Women's 10 m air rifle	627.2	6 Q	122.9	8
Marta Zeljković	Women's 10 m air rifle	624.3	10	Did not advance	
Lana Spirelja	Women's 10 m air pistol	569.0 9x	7 Q	112.1	8

Mixed

Athlete	Event	Qualification		Final	
Athlete	Event	Points	Rank	Points	Rank
Miran Maričić; Anamarija Turk	Mixed rifle team	627.5	7	Did not advance	
Marta Zeljković; Darko Tomašević	Mixed rifle team	625.1	11	Did not advance	

Shotgun
Men

Athlete	Event	Qualification		Final	
Athlete	Event	Points	Rank	Points	Rank
Anton Glasnović	Men's trap	120	7 Q	7	8
Josip Glasnović	Men's trap	119	8 Q	12	5

== Swimming ==
Men

Athlete	Event	Heat		Final	
Athlete	Event	Time	Rank	Time	Rank
Luka Cvetko	50 m freestyle	22.21	3 q	22.16	3rd place, bronze medalist(s)
Božo Puhalović	50 m freestyle	22.73	8 q	22.86	8
Toni Dragoja	100 m freestyle	49.70	4 q	48.77	1st place, gold medalist(s)
Vili Sivec	100 m freestyle	49.92	7 q	49.19	2nd place, silver medalist(s)
Niko Janković	200 m freestyle	1:51.24	14	Did not advance	
Karlo Perčinić	200 m freestyle	1:52.17	17	Did not advance	
Franko Grgić	400 m freestyle	3:52.82	8 q	3:49.84	4
Marin Mogić	400 m freestyle	4:00.71	14	Did not advance	
Franko Grgić	800 m freestyle	—N/a		7:57.27	4
Marin Mogić	800 m freestyle	—N/a		8:19.01	11
Franko Grgić	1500 m freestyle	—N/a		15:12.48	4
Vito Radoš	50 m breaststroke	29.45	13	Did not advance	
Filip Mujan	100 m breaststroke	1:01.74	4 q	1:02.01	5
Vito Radoš	100 m breaststroke	1:03.00	11	Did not advance	
Filip Mujan	200 m breaststroke	2:13.98	3 q	2:11.14	3rd place, bronze medalist(s)
Vito Radoš	200 m breaststroke	2:23.27	11	Did not advance	
Nikola Miljenić	50 m backstroke	25.45	4 q	25.28	3rd place, bronze medalist(s)
Luka Čarapović	50 m backstroke	25.69	7 q	25.45	=6
Luka Čarapović	100 m backstroke	56.33	8 q	55.29	7
Luka Čarapović	200 m backstroke	2:05.82	11	Did not advance	
Nikola Miljenić	50 m butterfly	23.72	5 q	23.49	5
Maro Miknić	50 m butterfly	24.20	10	Did not advance	
Maro Miknić	100 m butterfly	52.58	3 q	52.80	4
Vili Sivec	100 m butterfly	52.90	5 q	52.90	6
Karlo Perčinić	200 m butterfly	2:12.93	13	Did not advance	
Niko Janković	200 m individual medley	-	DNS	Did not advance	
Karlo Perčinić	400 m individual medley	4:38.68	13	Did not advance	

Women

Athlete	Event	Heat		Final	
Athlete	Event	Time	Rank	Time	Rank
Mia Hren	50 m freestyle	26.87	14	Did not advance	
Mia Hren	100 m freestyle	58.32	12	Did not advance	
Mia Hren	200 m freestyle	2:06.22	11	Did not advance	
Meri Mataja	50 m breaststroke	32.63	11	Did not advance	
Ana Blažević	100 m breaststroke	1:09.26	5 q	1:08.64	4
Ana Blažević	200 m breaststroke	2:21.61	1 q	2:27.63	2nd place, silver medalist(s)
Amina Kajtaz Pinjo	100 m butterfly	1:00.53	6 q	59.17	4
Amina Kajtaz Pinjo	200 m butterfly	2:17.40	8 q	2:15.03	7

Mixed

Athlete	Event	Heat		Final	
Athlete	Event	Time	Rank	Time	Rank
Luka Čarapović; Ana Blažević; Amina Kajtaz Pinjo; Toni Dragoja; Meri Mataja	4x100 medley relay	4:10.18	7 q	3:51.33	4

== Taekwondo ==
Men

Athlete	Event	Round of 16	Quarterfinals	Semifinals	Final / BM	
Athlete	Event	Opposition Result	Opposition Result	Opposition Result	Opposition Result	Rank
Josip Teskera	Men's − 58 kg	Ademi (KOS); W 2-0	Vasilič (SRB); W 2-0	Rodriguez (ESP); W 2-1	Kaplan (TUR); L 0-2	2nd place, silver medalist(s)
Marko Golubić	Men's − 68 kg	Husić (BIH); W 2-1	Erer (TUR); W 2-0	Jendoubi (TUN); L 0-2	Did not advance	3rd place, bronze medalist(s)
Leon Hrgota	Men's − 80 kg	Barry (FRA); W 2-0	Husić (BIH); W 2-0	Zarhouti (MAR); L 1-2	Did not advance	3rd place, bronze medalist(s)
Ivan Šapina	Men's + 80 kg	Tufa (KOS); W 2-0	Golubović (SRB); W 2-0	Demircioglu (TUR); W 2-0	Elasbi (MAR); L 0-2	2nd place, silver medalist(s)

Women

Athlete	Event	Round of 16	Quarterfinals	Semifinals	Final / BM	
Athlete	Event	Opposition Result	Opposition Result	Opposition Result	Opposition Result	Rank
Sofija Hinić	Women's − 49 kg	Bye	Touzani (MAR); W 2-1	Linan Pardo (AND); W 2-0	Akgul (TUR); L 0-2	2nd place, silver medalist(s)
Ivana Arelić	Women's − 67 kg	Cassar (MLT); W 2-0	Masghouni (TUN); L 0-2	Did not advance		

== Triathlon ==
Individual

Athlete	Event	Time						Rank
Athlete	Event	Swim (1.5 km)	Trans 1	Bike (40 km)	Trans 2	Run (10 km)	Total	Rank
Gabriel Barač	Men's	9:53	0:19	29:10	0:21	16.51	56:34	9

== Weightlifting ==
Women

Athlete	Event	Snatch		Clean & Jerk	
Athlete	Event	Result	Rank	Result	Rank
Ivona Gavran	Women's 77 kg	89	5	102	5

== Wrestling ==
Key:

- WO – walkover
- VT (ranking points: 5–0 or 0–5) – Victory by fall.
- VB (ranking points: 5–0 or 0–5) – Victory by injury (VF for forfeit, VA for withdrawal or disqualification)
- PP (ranking points: 3–1 or 1–3) – Decision by points – the loser with technical points.
- PO (ranking points: 3–0 or 0–3) – Decision by points – the loser without technical points.
- ST (ranking points: 4–0 or 0–4) – Great superiority – the loser without technical points and a margin of victory of at least 8 (Greco-Roman) or 10 (freestyle) points.
- SP (ranking points: 4–1 or 1–4) – Technical superiority – the loser with technical points and a margin of victory of at least 8 (Greco-Roman) or 10 (freestyle) points.

Greco-Roman

Athlete	Event	Group Stage			Round of 16	Quarterfinal	Semifinal	Repechage	Final / BM	
Athlete	Event	Opposition Result	Opposition Result	Rank	Opposition Result	Opposition Result	Opposition Result	Opposition Result	Opposition Result	Rank
Dominik Etlinger	Men's 67 kg	—N/a			Bye	Abdelr (EGY) L PP (1-3)	Did not advance	Bye	Firat (TUR) L PP (1-5)	5
Antonio Kamenjašević	Men's 77 kg	—N/a			Tarhouni (TUN) W ST (9-0)	Dariozzi (ITA) W PP (3-1)	Kolitsopoulos (GRE) W PP (5-1)	—N/a	Basar (TUR) L PP (1-2)	2nd place, silver medalist(s)
Ivan Huklek	Men's 87 kg	—N/a			Bye	Sid Azara (ALG) W VT (1-4)	Rivalta (ITA) W PP (8-3)	Bye	Saied (EGY) W DQ (5-1)	1st place, gold medalist(s)

Freestyle

Women

Athlete	Event	Group Stage			Round of 16	Quarterfinal	Semifinal	Repechage	Final / BM	
Athlete	Event	Opposition Result	Opposition Result	Rank	Opposition Result	Opposition Result	Opposition Result	Opposition Result	Opposition Result	Rank
Veronika Vilk	Women's 68 kg	—N/a			Bye	Drazhi (ALB) W PP (10-5)	Godino (ITA) L SP (3-13)	—N/a	Sghaier (TUN) L PP (1-7)	5
