= List of Croatian records in swimming =

The list of Croatian records in swimming shows the fastest performances in the sport of swimming by Croatian nationals. They are ratified and tracked by the Croatian Swimming Federation.

== Long course (50 m) ==
=== Men ===
Event	Time		Name	Club	Date	Meet	Location	Ref
50 m freestyle	21.29	sf	Duje Draganja	Croatia	31 Jul 2009	World Championships	Rome, Italy	
100 m freestyle	47.42		Jere Hribar	Croatia	12 August 2026	European Championships	Paris, France	
200 m freestyle	1:46.48		Niko Janković	Croatia	21 June 2024	European Championships	Belgrade, Serbia	
400 m freestyle	3:49.32		Marin Mogić	Jadran	16 March 2019	Croatian Team Championships	Rijeka, Croatia	
800 m freestyle	7:45.92		Franko Grgić	Croatia	22 August 2019	World Junior Championships	Budapest, Hungary	
1500 m freestyle	14:46.09		Franko Grgić	Croatia	25 August 2019	World Junior Championships	Budapest, Hungary	
50 m backstroke	25.36	h	Luka Čarapović	Croatia	13 August 2026	European Championships	Paris, France	
50 m backstroke	25.28	#	Nikola Miljenić	Croatia	23 August 2026	Mediterranean Games	Taranto, Italy	
100 m backstroke	54.44	h	Luka Čarapović	Croatia	15 August 2026	European Championships	Paris, France	
200 m backstroke	1:57.47		Gordan Kožulj	Croatia	25 July 2003	World Championships	Barcelona, Spain	
50 m breaststroke	27.27	h	Nikola Obrovac	Croatia	23 July 2019	World Championships	Gwangju, South Korea	
100 m breaststroke	1:01.18	h	Nikola Obrovac	Croatia	21 July 2019	World Championships	Gwangju, South Korea	
200 m breaststroke	2:11.23	h	Filip Mujan	Croatia	27 June 2025	European U23 Championships	Šamorín, Slovakia	
200 m breaststroke	2:11.14	#	Filip Mujan	Croatia	23 August 2026	Mediterranean Games	Taranto, Italy	
50m butterfly	23.03	sf	Duje Draganja	Croatia	26 Jul 2009	World Championships	Rome, Italy	
100m butterfly	51.42	sf	Dominik Straga	-	4 Jul 2009	Croatian Championships	Rijeka, Croatia	
200m butterfly	1:58.09		Vili Sivec	Cal State Bakersfield	30 November 2023	Big Al Invitational	Princeton, United States	
200m individual medley	2:00.91		Nikša Roki	-	6 Jul 2009	Croatian Championships	Rijeka, Croatia	
400m individual medley	4:20.70		Juraj Barčot	Jug	11 May 2024	Golden Orlando	Dubrovnik, Croatia	
4 × 100 m freestyle relay	3:11.08		Jere Hribar (47.77); Vlaho Nenadić (47.96); Vili Sivec (48.24); Toni Dragoja (47.11)	Croatia	13 August 2026	European Championships	Paris, France	
4 × 200 m freestyle relay	7:16.22		Niko Janković (1:47.31); Vili Sivec (1:48.45); Marin Mogić (1:50.74); Karlo Percinić (1:49.72)	Croatia	17 June 2024	European Championships	Belgrade, Serbia	
4 × 100 m medley relay	3:34.87	h	Luka Čarapović (54.54); Filip Mujan (1:00.64); Vili Sivec (51.40); Vlaho Nenadić (48.29)	Croatia	16 August 2026	European Championships	Paris, France	

Legend: # – Record awaiting ratification by Croatian Swimming Federation; WR – World record; ER – European record; e – equalled existing record;
Records not set in finals: h – heat; sf – semifinal; r – relay 1st leg; rh – relay heat 1st leg; b – B final; † – en route to final mark; so – swim-off; tt – time trial

=== Women ===
Event	Time		Name	Club	Date	Meet	Location	Ref
50m freestyle	24.67	sf	Jana Pavalić	Croatia	21 June 2024	European Championships	Belgrade, Serbia	
100m freestyle	55.03	rh	Jana Pavalić	Croatia	1 July 2025	European Junior Championships	Šamorín, Slovakia	
200m freestyle	2:01.18		Ana Bobanović	Primorje	23 July 2026	Croatian Championships	Zagreb, Croatia	
200m freestyle	2:01.17	#	Ana Bobanović	Croatia	6 November 2026	Youth Olympic Games	Dakar, Senegal	
400m freestyle	4:18.77		Lucijana Lukšić	Grdelin	31 July 2022	Croatian Championships	Zagreb, Croatia	
800m freestyle	8:46.49		Matea Sumajstorčić	Mladost	8 February 2020	Grand Prix Victoria	Rijeka, Croatia	
1500m freestyle	16:47.14		Matea Sumajstorčić	Mladost	21 June 2019	Croatian Championships	Zagreb, Croatia	
50m backstroke	28.05		Sanja Jovanović	-	21 June 2008	Golden Bear	Zagreb, Croatia	
100m backstroke	1:00.42		Matea Samardžić	Croatia	25 February 2016	Croatian Championships	Split, Croatia	
200m backstroke	2:08.77		Matea Samardžić	Scarlet Aquatics	3 August 2017	U.S. Open	East Meadow, United States	
50m breaststroke	30.87		Meri Mataja	Kantrida	17 July 2025	Croatian Championships	Zagreb, Croatia	
100m breaststroke	1:08.17		Ema Rajić	Unattached	13 November 2020	U.S. Open	San Antonio, United States	
200m breaststroke	2:25.35		Ana Blažević	Maksimir	25 June 2023	Golden Bear	Zagreb, Croatia	
50m butterfly	26.21		Jana Pavalić	Croatia	7 July 2024	European Junior Championships	Vilnius, Lithuania	
100m butterfly	58.34	tt	Amina Kajtaz	Kantrida	8 June 2024	Kantrida Junior Meet	Rijeka, Croatia	
200m butterfly	2:11.61		Amina Kajtaz	Kantrida	9 June 2023	Croatian Championships	Zagreb, Croatia	
200m individual medley	2:15.30		Ana Radić	Dubrava	25 February 2016	Croatian Championships	Split, Croatia	
400m individual medley	4:39.41	h	Matea Samardžić	Croatia	6 August 2016	Olympic Games	Rio de Janeiro, Brazil	
4 × 100 m freestyle relay	3:45.19		Jana Pavalić (55.70); Lucijana Lukšić (56.34); Mia Hren (57.05); Ana Bobanović (56.10)	Croatia	1 July 2025	European Junior Championships	Šamorín, Slovakia	
4 × 200 m freestyle relay	8:21.77	h	Ana Bobanović (2:03.57); Lucijana Lukšić (2:05.22); Mia Hren (2:06.97); Lara Luetić (2:06.01)	Croatia	3 July 2025	European Junior Championships	Šamorín, Slovakia	
4 × 100 m medley relay	4:15.74		Marta Isaković (1:03.99); Eva Resnik (1:09.53); Lana Vićan (1:04.12); Klara Barta (58.10)	Dubrava	25 July 2026	Croatian Championships	Zagreb, Croatia	

Legend: # – Record awaiting ratification by Croatian Swimming Federation; WR – World record; ER – European record; e – equalled existing record;
Records not set in finals: h – heat; sf – semifinal; r – relay 1st leg; rh – relay heat 1st leg; b – B final; † – en route to final mark; so – swim-off; tt – time trial

=== Mixed relay ===
Event	Time		Name	Club	Date	Meet	Location	Ref
4 × 100 m freestyle relay	3:31.13		Vlaho Nenadić (48.83); Filip Gruica (50.38); Jana Pavalić (55.73); Mia Hren (56.19)	Croatia	3 July 2024	European Junior Championships	Vilnius, Lithuania	
4 × 100 m medley relay	4:00.34	h	Lucijana Lukšić (1:04.84); Stjepan Matteo Deswarte (1:03.27); Milan Čubra (55.06); Ana Bobanović (57.07)	Croatia	4 July 2025	European Junior Championships	Šamorín, Slovakia	
4 × 100 m medley relay	3:51.33	#	Luka Čarapović (55.07); Ana Blažević (1:09.39); Amina Kajtaz (58.76); Toni Dragoja (48.11)	Croatia	23 August 2026	Mediterranean Games	Taranto, Italy	

Legend: # – Record awaiting ratification by Croatian Swimming Federation; WR – World record; ER – European record; e – equalled existing record;
Records not set in finals: h – heat; sf – semifinal; r – relay 1st leg; rh – relay heat 1st leg; b – B final; † – en route to final mark; so – swim-off; tt – time trial

== Short course (25 m) ==
=== Men ===
Event	Time		Name	Club	Date	Meet	Location	Ref
50m freestyle	20.70	=	Duje Draganja	Croatia	10 Dec 2009	European Championships	Istanbul, Turkey	
50m freestyle	20.70	r, =	Jere Hribar	Croatia	2 December 2025	European Championships	Lublin, Poland	
50m freestyle	20.70	=	Jere Hribar	Croatia	7 December 2025	European Championships	Lublin, Poland	
100m freestyle	45.64		Jere Hribar	Croatia	6 December 2025	European Championships	Lublin, Poland	
200m freestyle	1:43.71	h	Toni Dragoja	Alabama	31 October 2026	World Championship Trials	Westmont, United States	
400m freestyle	3:44.67		Niko Janković	Mladost	20 December 2024	Croatian Championships	Zadar, Croatia	
800m freestyle	7:55.55		Marin Mogić	Croatia	14 December 2024	World Championships	Budapest, Hungary	
1500m freestyle	14:53.18		Franko Grgić	Jadran	23 December 2018	Croatian Championships	Rijeka, Croatia	
50m backstroke	23.69	sf	Ante Cvitković	Croatia	11 Dec 2009	European Championships	Istanbul, Turkey	
100m backstroke	51.09	h	Anton Lončar	Croatia	11 December 2018	World Championships	Hangzhou, China	
200m backstroke	1:51.62		Gordan Kožulj	Croatia	21 Jan 2001	World Cup	Berlin, Germany	
50m breaststroke	26.68		Nikola Miljenić	Medveščak	21 December 2024	Croatian Championships	Zadar, Croatia	
100m breaststroke	58.63		Vanja Rogulj	-	20 Dec 2009	-	Zagreb, Croatia	
200m breaststroke	2:07.98	h	Filip Mujan	Croatia	4 December 2025	European Championships	Lublin, Poland	
50m butterfly	22.52	sf	Nikola Miljenić	Croatia	8 December 2023	European Championships	Otopeni, Romania	
100m butterfly	50.23	h	Nikola Miljenić	Croatia	17 December 2021	World Championships	Abu Dhabi, United Arab Emirates	
200m butterfly	1:54.71		Nikša Roki	-	8 Jul 2009	-	Sisak, Croatia	
100m individual medley	51.20		Duje Draganja	Croatia	13 Dec 2009	European Championships	Istanbul, Turkey	
200m individual medley	1:56.59		Nikša Roki	-	8 Jul 2009	-	Sisak, Croatia	
400m individual medley	4:13.77		Juraj Barčot	Jug	17 December 2023	Croatian Championships	Rijeka, Croatia	
4 × 50 m freestyle relay	1:23.18		Duje Draganja (20.71); Alexei Puninski (20.55); Mario Todorović (20.87); Mario Delač (21.05)	Croatia	13 Dec 2009	European Championships	Istanbul, Turkey	
4 × 100 m freestyle relay	3:05.68		Jere Hribar (46.16); Nikola Miljenić (46.24); Vlaho Nenadić (46.70); Toni Dragoja (46.58)	Croatia	10 December 2024	World Championships	Budapest, Hungary	
4 × 200 m freestyle relay	7:08.84		Niko Janković (1:44.61); Vito Lončarić (1:48.03); Luka Kmetić (1:48.03); Antonio Zwicker (1:48.17)	Mladost	16 December 2023	Croatian Championships	Rijeka, Croatia	
4 × 50 m medley relay	1:33.48		Ante Cvitkovic (23.98); Vanja Rogulj (26.29); Mario Todorović (22.57); Alexei Puninski (20.64)	Croatia	10 Dec 2009	European Championships	Istanbul, Turkey	
4 × 100 m medley relay	3:29.51		Saša Imprić (52.39); Vanja Rogulj (58.17); Aleksandar Damjanić (51.85); Alexei Puninski (47.10)	-	19 Dec 2009	-	Sisak, Croatia	

Legend: # – Record awaiting ratification by Croatian Swimming Federation; WR – World record; ER – European record; e – equalled existing record;
Records not set in finals: h – heat; sf – semifinal; r – relay 1st leg; rh – relay heat 1st leg; b – B final; † – en route to final mark; so – swim-off; tt – time trial

=== Women ===
Event	Time		Name	Club	Date	Meet	Location	Ref
50m freestyle	23.86	sf	Jana Pavalić	Croatia	6 December 2025	European Championships	Lublin, Poland	
100m freestyle	52.74		Jana Pavalić	Olimp-Zabok	18 December 2025	Croatian Championships	Split, Croatia	
200m freestyle	1:57.79		Jana Pavalić	Olimp-Zabok	8 November 2025	Mladost Meet	Zagreb, Croatia	
400m freestyle	4:11.79		Matea Sumajstorčić	Mladost	14 December 2019	Croatian Championships	Split, Croatia	
800m freestyle	8:32.46		Matea Sumajstorčić	Mladost	9 November 2019	Mladost Meet	Zagreb, Croatia	
1500m freestyle	16:26.73		Klara Bošnjak	Medvesca	16 December 2021	Croatian Championships	Rijeka, Croatia	
50m backstroke	25.70	ER	Sanja Jovanović	Croatia	12 Dec 2009	European Championships	Istanbul, Turkey	
100m backstroke	56.87		Sanja Jovanović	Croatia	12 Dec 2008	European Championships	Rijeka, Croatia	
200m backstroke	2:07.46	h	Matea Samardžić	Croatia	15 December 2017	European Championships	Copenhagen, Denmark	
50m breaststroke	30.17	sf	Meri Mataja	Croatia	14 December 2024	World Championships	Budapest, Hungary	
100m breaststroke	1:06.42		Meri Mataja	Kantrida	9 November 2024	Mladost Meet	Zagreb, Croatia	
200m breaststroke	2:21.50	sf	Ana Blažević	Croatia	7 December 2023	European Championships	Otopeni, Romania	
50m butterfly	25.80		Jana Pavalić	Olimp-Zabok	19 December 2025	Croatian Championships	Split, Croatia	
100m butterfly	57.88	h	Amina Kajtaz	Croatia	17 December 2022	World Championships	Melbourne, Australia	
200m butterfly	2:06.90	h	Amina Kajtaz	Croatia	15 December 2022	World Championships	Melbourne, Australia	
100m individual medley	1:00.99		Sanja Jovanović	-	20 Mar 2009	Croatian Championships	Zagreb, Croatia	
200m individual medley	2:10.54		Ana Radić	Dubrava	7 November 2015	Mladost Meet	Zagreb, Croatia	
400m individual medley	4:40.30		Ana Radić	Dubrava	8 November 2015	Mladost Meet	Zagreb, Croatia	
4 × 50 m freestyle relay	1:41.69		Sanja Jovanović (25.43); Monika Babok (24.86); Smiljana Marinović (25.52); Maja Pavlović (25.88)	Croatia	14 December 2007	European Championships	Debrecen, Hungary	
4 × 100 m freestyle relay	3:44.20		-; -; -; -	-	18 December 2011	-	Zagreb, Croatia	
4 × 200 m freestyle relay	8:09.97		Lara Luetić (2:04.02); Matea Sumajstorčić (2:02.39); Nika Špehar (2:01.85); Mia Hren (2:01.71)	Mladost	21 December 2024	Croatian Championships	Zadar, Croatia	
4 × 50 m medley relay	1:51.08		Sanja Jovanović (27.13); Smiljana Marinović (31.69); Monika Babok (26.54); Maja Pavlović (25.72)	Croatia	15 December 2007	European Championships	Debrecen, Hungary	
4 × 100 m medley relay	4:06.81		-; -; -; -	-	18 December 2011	-	Zagreb, Croatia	

Legend: # – Record awaiting ratification by Croatian Swimming Federation; WR – World record; ER – European record; e – equalled existing record;
Records not set in finals: h – heat; sf – semifinal; r – relay 1st leg; rh – relay heat 1st leg; b – B final; † – en route to final mark; so – swim-off; tt – time trial

=== Mixed relay ===
Event	Time		Name	Club	Date	Meet	Location	Ref
4×50 m freestyle relay	1:30.70		Jere Hribar (20.70); Luka Cvetko (21.16); Jana Pavalić (23.67); Meri Mataja (25.17)	Croatia	4 December 2025	European Championships	Lublin, Poland	
4×50 m medley relay	1:39.16	h	Nikola Miljenić (23.37); Meri Mataja (29.69); Jana Pavalić (25.74); Jere Hribar (20.36)	Croatia	11 December 2024	World Championships	Budapest, Hungary	

Legend: # – Record awaiting ratification by Croatian Swimming Federation; WR – World record; ER – European record; e – equalled existing record;
Records not set in finals: h – heat; sf – semifinal; r – relay 1st leg; rh – relay heat 1st leg; b – B final; † – en route to final mark; so – swim-off; tt – time trial
