= Boules at the 2026 Mediterranean Games =

Boules competition

- Venue: Palazzetto dello Sport, Montemesola
- Dates: 22–25 August

The boules event at the 2026 Mediterranean Games was held in Montemesola, Italy, from 22 to 25 August 2026. Athletes competed in nine events across three disciplines: lyonnaise, pétanque and raffa.

== Medal table ==
* Host nation (Italy)

Rank	Nation	Gold	Silver	Bronze	Total
1	Italy*	4	1	3	8
2	France	3	1	3	7
3	San Marino	2	0	1	3
4	Spain	1	4	0	5
5	Tunisia	1	0	2	3
6	Slovenia	1	0	1	2
7	Croatia	0	5	0	5
8	Turkey	0	1	1	2
9	Algeria	0	0	1	1
9	Montenegro	0	0	1	1
Totals (10 entries)		12	12	13	37

== Medal summary ==
=== Lyonnaise ===
Event	Gold	Silver	Bronze
Men's precision shooting	Achref Zouaoui; Tunisia	Matteo Mana; Italy	Gracija Stjepčević; Montenegro
Men's progressive shooting	Frédéric Marsens; France	Marino Milićević; Croatia	Diego Verganti; Italy; Urban Hiti; Slovenia
Women's precision shooting	Eneja Ozbič; Slovenia	Cristina Soler; Spain	Annaelle Barazzutti; France
Women's progressive shooting	Marie Groleaz; France	Mine Türker; Turkey	Gaia Gamba; Italy

=== Pétanque ===
Event	Gold	Silver	Bronze
Men's precision shooting	Diego Rizzi; Italy	Manuel Luque Gonzalez; Spain	Yohan Cousin; France
Men's doubles	Italy; Diego Rizzi; Andrea Chiapello	Spain; Manuel Luque Gonzalez; Sergi Ruiz Alvarez	France; Yohan Cousin; Christophe Sarrio
Women's precision shooting	Alba Valiente; Spain	Nelly Peyré; France	Mouna Beji; Tunisia
Women's doubles	France; Nelly Peyré; Toréa Tairio	Spain; Alba Valiente; Celia Abril	Tunisia; Mouna Beji; Ahlem Hadj Hassen

=== Raffa ===
Event	Gold	Silver	Bronze
Men's individual	Jacopo Frisoni; San Marino	Luka Žure; Croatia	Abdullah Kaplan; Turkey
Men's doubles	San Marino; Enrico Dall'Olmo; Jacopo Frisoni	Croatia; Luka Žure; Duje Pirić	Italy; Alfonso Nanni; Luca Viscusi
Women's individual	Laura Picchio; Italy	Ana Juginović; Croatia	Nor El Houda Maidi; Algeria
Women's doubles	Italy; Laura Picchio; Kety Crescenzi	Croatia; Ana Juginović; Neda Ćorić	San Marino; Stella Paoletti; Giada Paoletti
