= Boules sports at the 2017 World Games – Men's petanque precision shooting =

Boules sports - Men's Petanque Precision Shooting at the 2017 World Games
- Venue: Centennial Hall, Wrocław, Poland
- Dates: 22–24 July 2017
- Competitors: 8 from 8 nations

Medalists
gold medal	(France) Henri Lacroix
silver medal	(Thailand) Thanakorn Sangkaew
bronze medal	(Italy) Diego Rizzi

The men's petanque precision shooting competition in boules sports at the 2017 World Games took place from 22 to 24 July 2017 at the Centennial Hall in Wrocław, Poland.

== Competition format ==
A total of 8 athletes entered the competition. Top 4 athletes from qualification advances to semifinals.

== Results ==
=== Qualification ===
Rank	Athlete	Nation	Round 1	Round 2	Score	Note
1	Diego Rizzi	Italy	67		67	Q
2	Claudy Weibel	Belgium	56		56	Q
3	Thanakorn Sangkaew	Thailand	44	59	103	Q
4	Henri Lacroix	France	31	59	90	Q
5	Tafita Andriamahandry	Madagascar	40	50	90	
6	Morten Junge Olsen	Denmark	38	39	77	
7	Manuel Romero	Spain	30	39	69	
8	Jędrzej Śliż	Poland	26	41	67	

=== Finals ===
Semifinals
1	(Italy) Diego Rizzi	53
4	(France) Henri Lacroix	55
2	(Belgium) Claudy Weibel	42
3	(Thailand) Thanakorn Sangkaew	58

Final
4	(France) Henri Lacroix	60
3	(Thailand) Thanakorn Sangkaew	53
Third place
2	(Belgium) Claudy Weibel	39
1	(Italy) Diego Rizzi	45
