= Canoeing at the 2026 Mediterranean Games – Women's C-1 200 metres =

Women's canoe sprint C-1 200 metres at the 2026 Mediterranean Games
- Venue: Parco Cimino - Mar Piccolo
- Date: 23 August
- Competitors: 5 from 5 nations
- Winning time: 47.97

Medalists
gold medal	Elena Voltan	Italy
silver medal	Vanesa Tot	Croatia
bronze medal	Valeria Oliveira Otero	Spain

The women's canoe sprint C-1 200 metres at the 2026 Mediterranean Games in Taranto took place on 23 August at the Parco Cimino – Mar Piccolo.

== Schedule ==
All times are Italy time (UTC+02:00)

Date	Time	Round
Sunday, 23 August 2026	9:00	Final

== Results ==
=== Final ===
Rank	Lane	Canoer	Country	Time	Notes
1st place, gold medalist(s)	7	Elena Voltan	Italy	47.97	
2nd place, silver medalist(s)	5	Vanesa Tot	Croatia	48.04	
3rd place, bronze medalist(s)	4	Valeria Oliveira Otero	Spain	49.01	
4	3	Lisa Cornez	France	53.71	
5	6	Chanez Slimane	Algeria	1:01.11	
