= Işıl Zafer =

Turkish taekwondo practitioner (born 2004)

Personal information
- Born: 24 April 2004 (age 22) Turkey

Sport
- Country: Turkey
- Sport: Taekwondo
- Events: Middleweight , 67 kg
- Club: Istanbul BB
- Coached by: Oğuzhan Tokgöz
Medal record
Women's taekwondo
Representing Turkey
Mediterranean Games
Gold medal – first place	2026 Taranto	67 kg

Işıl Zafer (born 24 April 2004) is a Turkish taekwondo practitioner competing in the middleweight (67 kg) division. She is 2026 Mediterranean Games champion.

== Sport caree r ==
Zefer started with taekwondo at the age of nine during her primary school education. She continued practicing, and as of 2020, she has won seven Turkish champions titles in different age categories.

She competed in the 67 kg event at the 2026 European Championships in Munich, Germany, where she failed to advance from the round of 16.

She captured the gold medal in the 67 kg event at the 2026 Mediterranean Games in Taranto, Italy.
