= Taekwondo at the 2026 Mediterranean Games =

Taekwondo competition

- Venue: Palasport Giovanni Paolo II
- Dates: 22–23 August
- Competitors: 110 from 21 nations

The taekwondo event at the 2026 Mediterranean Games took place between 22 and 23 August 2026 in Massafra, Italy.

== Medal summary ==
=== Men's events ===
Event	Gold	Silver	Bronze
Flyweight (58 kg)	Enes Kaplan; Turkey	Josip Teskera; Croatia	Nadir Harbi; Algeria
Flyweight (58 kg)	Enes Kaplan; Turkey	Josip Teskera; Croatia	Jesús Fraile; Spain
Lightweight (68 kg)	Souleyman Alaphilippe; France	Mohamed Khalil Jendoubi; Tunisia	Marko Golubić; Croatia
Lightweight (68 kg)	Souleyman Alaphilippe; France	Mohamed Khalil Jendoubi; Tunisia	Žarko Krajišnik; Serbia
Middleweight (80 kg)	Firas Katoussi; Tunisia	Haitam Zarhouti; Morocco	Leon Hrgota; Croatia
Middleweight (80 kg)	Firas Katoussi; Tunisia	Haitam Zarhouti; Morocco	Stefan Takov; Serbia
Heavyweight (+80 kg)	Soufiane Elasbi; Morocco	Ivan Šapina; Croatia	Hüseyin Demircioğlu; Turkey
Heavyweight (+80 kg)	Soufiane Elasbi; Morocco	Ivan Šapina; Croatia	Iván García; Spain

=== Women's events ===
Event	Gold	Silver	Bronze
Flyweight (49 kg)	Elif Sude Akgül; Turkey	Sofija Hinić; Croatia	Sayine Krim; France
Flyweight (49 kg)	Elif Sude Akgül; Turkey	Sofija Hinić; Croatia	Naiara Liñán; Andorra
Lightweight (57 kg)	Hatice Kübra İlgün; Turkey	Amina Dehhaoui; Morocco	Chaima Toumi; Tunisia
Lightweight (57 kg)	Hatice Kübra İlgün; Turkey	Amina Dehhaoui; Morocco	Ada Avdagić; Bosnia and Herzegovina
Middleweight (67 kg)	Işıl Zafer; Turkey	Wafa Masghouni; Tunisia	Styliani Marentaki; Greece
Middleweight (67 kg)	Işıl Zafer; Turkey	Wafa Masghouni; Tunisia	Nada Laaraj; Morocco
Heavyweight (+67 kg)	Sude Yaren Uzunçavdar; Turkey	Anđela Šević; Serbia	Agoritsa Kitsiou; Greece
Heavyweight (+67 kg)	Sude Yaren Uzunçavdar; Turkey	Anđela Šević; Serbia	Ane Vallo; Spain

== Medal table ==
* Host nation (Italy)

Rank	Nation	Gold	Silver	Bronze	Total
1	Turkey	5	0	1	6
2	Morocco	1	2	1	4
2	Tunisia	1	2	1	4
4	France	1	0	1	2
5	Croatia	0	3	2	5
6	Serbia	0	1	2	3
7	Spain	0	0	3	3
8	Greece	0	0	2	2
9	Algeria	0	0	1	1
9	Andorra	0	0	1	1
9	Bosnia and Herzegovina	0	0	1	1
Totals (11 entries)		8	8	16	32
