= Swimming at the 2026 Mediterranean Games – Men's 400 metre freestyle =

Men's 400 metre freestyle at the 2026 Mediterranean Games
- Location: Taranto, Italy
- Dates: 22 August
- Competitors: 17 from 12 nations
- Winning time: 3:47.07

Medalists
gold medal	Dimitrios Markos	Greece
silver medal	Alessandro Ragaini	Italy
bronze medal	Ahmed Jaouadi	Tunisia

The Men's 400 metre freestyle competition at the 2026 Mediterranean Games was held on 22 August 2026 at the Torre d'Ayala Swimming Stadium in Taranto.

== Records ==
Prior to this competition, the existing world and Mediterranean Games records were as follows:

World record	Lukas Märtens (GER)	3:39.96	Stockholm, Sweden	12 April 2025
Mediterranean Games record	Oussama Mellouli (TUN)	3:42.71	Pescara, Italy	27 June 2009

== Results ==
=== Heats ===
The heats were started at 10:13.

Rank	Heat	Lane	Name	Nationality	Time	Notes
1	3	4	Marco De Tullio	Italy	3:50.75	q
2	3	5	Alessandro Ragaini	Italy	3:51.44	q
3	2	5	Dimitrios Markos	Greece	3:51.82	q
4	2	4	Ahmed Jaouadi	Tunisia	3:51.93	q
5	3	6	Cristóbal Vargas	Spain	3:52.00	q
6	3	2	Vasileios Kakoulakis	Greece	3:52.02	q
7	2	2	Jovan Lekić	Bosnia and Herzegovina	3:52.43	q
8	2	3	Franko Grgić	Croatia	3:52.82	q
9	3	7	Nikola Simić	Serbia	3:53.32	
10	2	6	Ahmet Mete Boylu	Turkey	3:54.54	
11	3	3	Sašo Boškan	Slovenia	3:55.22	
12	2	1	Rodrigo Borges	Portugal	3:59.87	
13	1	5	Munzer Kabbara	Lebanon	4:00.56	
14	3	1	Marin Mogić	Croatia	4:00.71	
15	2	7	Emir Batur Albayrak	Turkey	4:02.12	
16	1	4	Arne Furlan Štular	Slovenia	4:02.25	
17	1	3	Ognen Slavkovski	North Macedonia	4:04.37	

=== Final ===
The final was held at 18:13.

Rank	Name	Nationality	Time	Notes
1st place, gold medalist(s)	Dimitrios Markos	Greece	3:47.07	
2nd place, silver medalist(s)	Alessandro Ragaini	Italy	3:49.02	
3rd place, bronze medalist(s)	Ahmed Jaouadi	Tunisia	3:49.13	
4	Franko Grgić	Croatia	3:49.84	
5	Marco De Tullio	Italy	3:50.21	
6	Cristóbal Vargas	Spain	3:51.33	
7	Vasileios Kakoulakis	Greece	3:51.37	
8	Jovan Lekić	Bosnia and Herzegovina	3:59.97	
