= Mine Türker =

Turkish boccia player (born 2006)

Personal information
- National team: Turkey
- Born: 4 June 2006 (age 20) --> Bursa, Turkey

Sport
- Sport: Bocce volo
- Club: Bursa BB
Medal record
Women's Bocce volo
Representing Turkey
World Bocce Volo Championship
Bronze medal – third place	2025 Mâcon	Volo progressive throw
European Bocce Championship
Gold medal – first place	2024 Mersin	Volo doubles relay
Mediterranean Games
Silver medal – second place	2026 Taranto	Volo progressive throw
World Cup
Silver medal – second place	2026 Saint-Vulbas	U23 Volo progressive throw
Silver medal – second place	2026 Saint-Vulbas	U23 Volo doubles relay =

Mine Türker (born 4 June 2006) is a Turksh female bocce volo player. She represents Turkey at international competitions.

== Sport career ==
Türker is a member of Bursa BB in her hometown.

She captured the gold medal in the Volo doubles relay with İnci Ece Öztürk at the 2024 European Bocce Women&Mix Championship in Mersin, Turkey.

At the 2025 World Women&Mix Bocce Volo Championship in Mâcon, France, she took the bronze medal in the Volo progreevenssive throw event.

She won silber medal in the progressive throw and Doubles relay event at the World Cup of Champions "Jeannot Vedrine" Women U18/U23 in Saint-Vulbas, France. She won the silver medal in the Lyonnaise – progressive shooting event at the 2026 Mediterranean Games in Taranto, Italy.
