= Swimming at the 2026 Mediterranean Games – Men's 50 metre butterfly =

Men's 50 metre butterfly at the 2026 Mediterranean Games
- Location: Taranto, Italy
- Dates: 22 August
- Competitors: 20 from 13 nations
- Winning time: 23.18

Medalists
| gold medal | Abdelrahman Sameh | Egypt |
| silver medal | Lorenzo Gargani | Italy |
| bronze medal | Stergios Bilas | Greece |

The Men's 50 metre butterfly competition at the 2026 Mediterranean Games was held on 22 August 2026 at the Torre d'Ayala Swimming Stadium in Taranto.

== Records ==
Prior to this competition, the existing world and Mediterranean Games record were as follows:

| World record | Andriy Govorov (UKR) | 22.27 | Rome, Italy | 1 July 2018 |
| Mediterranean Games record | Diogo Ribeiro (POR) | 23.38 | Oran, Algery | 1 July 2022 |

During the competition, Abdelrahman Sameh break the Mediterranean Games record in the final, winning the gold medal in 23.18. He improved the previous record of 23.38, set by Diogo Ribeiro at the 2022 Mediterranean Games, by 0.20 seconds.

| Record | Athlete | Time | Location | Date | Improvement |
|---|---|---|---|---|---|
| Mediterranean Games record | Abdelrahman Sameh (EGY) | 23.18 | Taranto, Italy | 22 August 2026 | -0.20 s |

== Results ==
=== Heats ===
The heats were started at 10:38.

| Rank | Heat | Lane | Swimmer | Nation | Time | Notes |
|---|---|---|---|---|---|---|
| 1 | 2 | 4 | Stergios Bilas | Greece | 23.43 | Q |
| 2 | 1 | 5 | Teo del Riego | Spain | 23.48 | Q |
| 3 | 3 | 4 | Abdelrahman Sameh | Egypt | 23.50 | Q |
| 4 | 1 | 4 | Lorenzo Gargani | Italy | 23.52 | Q |
| 5 | 3 | 5 | Nikola Miljenić | Croatia | 23.72 | Q |
| 6 | 2 | 5 | Victor Sanin | Italy | 23.84 | Q |
| 6 | 3 | 3 | Youssef Ramadan | Egypt | 23.84 | Q |
| 8 | 2 | 3 | Miloš Milenković | Montenegro | 23.86 | Q |
| 9 | 1 | 6 | Andreas Vazaios | Greece | 24.16 | |
| 10 | 1 | 3 | Arda Akkoyun | Turkey | 24.20 | |
| 10 | 2 | 6 | Maro Miknić | Croatia | 24.20 | |
| 12 | 3 | 6 | Nemanja Maksić | Serbia | 24.28 | |
| 13 | 1 | 2 | Andrew Laghoutis | Cyprus | 24.41 | |
| 14 | 2 | 2 | Efe Hacısalihoğlu | Turkey | 24.50 | |
| 15 | 3 | 2 | Vasco Morgado | Portugal | 24.53 | |
| 16 | 1 | 7 | Kevins Apseniece | Portugal | 24.72 | |
| 17 | 2 | 7 | Jovan Jankovski | North Macedonia | 24.86 | |
| 18 | 3 | 1 | Farid Zeidan | Lebanon | 24.96 | |
| 19 | 3 | 7 | Samy Boutouil | Morocco | 25.19 | |
| 20 | 2 | 1 | Rayan Arkadan | Lebanon | 26.14 | |
| | 1 | 2 | Belhassen Ben Miled | Tunisia | Did not start | |
| | 1 | 1 | Mohamed Hamour | Algeria | Did not start | |

=== Final ===
The final was held at 18:03.

| Rank | Lane | Swimmer | Nation | Time | Notes |
|---|---|---|---|---|---|
| 1st place, gold medalist(s) | 4 | Abdelrahman Sameh | Egypt | 23.18 | GR |
| 2nd place, silver medalist(s) | 5 | Lorenzo Gargani | Italy | 23.35 | |
| 3rd place, bronze medalist(s) | 3 | Stergios Bilas | Greece | 23.37 | |
| 4 | 6 | Teo del Riego | Spain | 23.40 | |
| 5 | 2 | Nikola Miljenić | Croatia | 23.49 | |
| 6 | 7 | Victor Sanin | Italy | 23.65 | |
| 7 | 1 | Youssef Ramadan | Egypt | 23.70 | |
| 8 | 8 | Miloš Milenković | Montenegro | 24.25 | |
