= Swimming at the 2026 Mediterranean Games – Men's 100 metre freestyle =

Men's 100 metre freestyle at the 2026 Mediterranean Games
- Location: Taranto, Italy
- Dates: 24 August
- Competitors: 21 from 15 nations
- Winning time: 48.77

Medalists
gold medal	Toni Dragoja	Croatia
silver medal	Vili Sivec	Croatia
bronze medal	Andreas Vazaios	Greece

The Men's 100 metre freestyle competition at the 2026 Mediterranean Games was held on 24 August 2026 at the Torre d'Ayala Swimming Stadium in Taranto.

== Records ==
Prior to this competition, the existing world and Mediterranean Games records were as follows:

World record	Pan Zhanle (CHN)	46.40	Paris, France	31 July 2024
Mediterranean Games record	Alain Bernard (FRA)	47.83	Pescara, Italy	29 Jun 2009

== Results ==
=== Heats ===
The heats were started at 10:09.

Rank	Heat	Lane	Name	Nationality	Time	Notes
1	2	4	Andreas Vazaios	Greece	49.28	q
2	1	3	Josep Castro Torrens	Spain	49.58	q
3	3	4	Velimir Stjepanović	Serbia	49.66	q
4	2	5	Toni Dragoja	Croatia	49.70	q
5	2	3	Dimitrios Markos	Greece	49.84	q
6	1	4	Lorenzo Ballarati	Italy	49.85	q
7	3	3	Vili Sivec	Croatia	49.92	q
8	3	6	Ahmet Mete Boylu	Turkey	49.94	q
9	1	5	Youssef Tarek Ramadan	Egypt	49.95	R1
10	3	5	Gianluca Messina	Italy	50.32	R2
11	2	6	Ian Florencio Fernández	Spain	50.71	
12	1	6	Marwane Sebbata	Morocco	50.89	
13	1	2	Saso Boskan	Slovenia	51.10	
14	2	2	Jovan Jankovski	North Macedonia	51.21	
15	2	7	Arne Furlan Štular	Slovenia	51.50	
16	3	7	Andrew Marcus Laghoutis	Cyprus	51.77	
17	3	2	Nikolas Antoniou	Cyprus	51.84	
18	3	1	Alessandro Rebosio	San Marino	52.34	
19	2	1	Farid Zeidan	Lebanon	52.67	
20	1	7	Stefan Todorov	North Macedonia	52.74	
21	1	1	Dior Krasniqi	Kosovo	55.09	

=== Final ===
The final was held at 18:54.

Rank	Lane	Name	Nationality	Time	Notes
1st place, gold medalist(s)	6	Toni Dragoja	Croatia	48.77	
2nd place, silver medalist(s)	1	Vili Sivec	Croatia	49.19	
3rd place, bronze medalist(s)	4	Andreas Vazaios	Greece	49.37	
4	7	Lorenzo Ballarati	Italy	49.50	
4	3	Velimir Stjepanović	Serbia	49.50	
6	2	Dimitrios Markos	Greece	49.69	
7	5	Josep Castro Torrens	Spain	49.86	
8	8	Ahmet Mete Boylu	Turkey	50.01	
