= Diego Rizzi =

Italian pétanque player (born 1994)

Personal information
- Nationality: Italian
- Born: 20 September 1994 (age 32) Bordighera, Italy

Sport
- Sport: Pétanque
- Club: Fréjus International Pétanque
Medal record
Representing Italy
World Championships
Bronze medal – third place	2012 Marseille	Triples
Bronze medal – third place	2015 Nice	Singles
Bronze medal – third place	2016 Antananarivo	Precision shooting
Silver medal – second place	2017 Ghent	Singles
Bronze medal – third place	2018 Desbiens	Precision shooting
Silver medal – second place	2019 Almería	Doubles
Silver medal – second place	2021 Santa Susanna	Precision shooting
Bronze medal – third place	2021 Santa Susanna	Triples
Gold medal – first place	2022 Karlslunde	Doubles
Silver medal – second place	2022 Karlslunde	Singles
Gold medal – first place	2024 Dijon	Triples
Gold medal – first place	2025 Rome	Singles
Bronze medal – third place	2025 Rome	Doubles
World Junior Championships
Gold medal – first place	2009 Monastir	Under-18 triples
Bronze medal – third place	2009 Monastir	Under-18 precision shooting
Gold medal – first place	2011 Kemer	Under-18 precision shooting
European Championships
Silver medal – second place	2013 Rome	Precision shooting
Bronze medal – third place	2013 Rome	Triples
Gold medal – first place	2015 Albena	Precision shooting
Silver medal – second place	2017 Saint-Pierre-lès-Elbeuf	Triples
Bronze medal – third place	2017 Saint-Pierre-lès-Elbeuf	Precision shooting
Gold medal – first place	2018 Savigliano	Singles
Gold medal – first place	2019 Albena	Triples
Gold medal – first place	2019 Albena	Precision shooting
Gold medal – first place	2022 ’s-Hertogenbosch	Singles
Gold medal – first place	2022 ’s-Hertogenbosch	Doubles
Silver medal – second place	2023 Albertville	Triples
Bronze medal – third place	2023 Albertville	Precision shooting
Bronze medal – third place	2025 Santa Susanna	Precision shooting
World Games
Gold medal – first place	2017 Wrocław	Doubles
Bronze medal – third place	2017 Wrocław	Precision shooting
Mediterranean Games
Gold medal – first place	2013 Mersin	Doubles
Gold medal – first place	2018 Tarragona	Precision shooting
Silver medal – second place	2018 Tarragona	Doubles
Gold medal – first place	2026 Taranto	Precision shooting
Gold medal – first place	2026 Taranto	Doubles

Diego Rizzi (born 20 September 1994) is an Italian pétanque player who has won multiple world and European championship titles.

== Career ==
Nicknamed L'alieno ('the alien'), Rizzi is right-handed and began playing pétanque in 2007. He achieved his first international successes in junior competitions. At the 2009 World Junior Championships in Monastir, he won the triples title with Alessandro Basso, Alessio Farina and Gianluca Rattenni, as well as a bronze medal in precision shooting. In 2011, he won the under-18 world title in precision shooting in Kemer.

At senior level, Rizzi won his first World Championship medal in 2012, taking bronze in the triples event in Marseille alongside Alessio Cocciolo, Fabio Dutto and Gianni Laigueglia. In 2013, he and Cocciolo won the men's doubles event at the 2013 Mediterranean Games in Mersin, defeating Tunisia 13–7 in the final. That season he also won four Italian titles, in singles, doubles, precision shooting and triples, while at the European Championships in Rome he claimed silver in precision shooting and bronze in triples.

In 2015, he won bronze in the singles event at the World Championships in Nice, and the European precision shooting title in Albena. The following year, he took bronze in precision shooting at the World Championships in Antananarivo.

At the 2017 World Games in Wrocław, Rizzi won gold in doubles with Fabio Dutto and bronze in precision shooting. During qualification for the latter event, he scored 67 points, setting a new world record in precision shooting. He also won European silver in triples and bronze in precision shooting in 2017.

In 2018, Rizzi won the European singles title in Savigliano, defeating France's Henri Lacroix in the final. He then took gold in precision shooting and silver in doubles with Cocciolo at the 2018 Mediterranean Games in Tarragona. At the World Championships in Desbiens, he won bronze in precision shooting.

At the 2019 European Championships in Albena, he finished first in both precision shooting and triples, the latter alongside Cocciolo, Florian Cometto and Andrea Chiapello. Later that year, he and Cocciolo were runners-up in doubles at the World Championships in Almería.

At the 2021 World Championships in Santa Susanna, Rizzi was selected for the Italian team coached by Riccardo Capaccioni, winning silver in precision shooting and bronze in triples. In 2022, he claimed his first senior world title by winning doubles with Cocciolo in Karlslunde, also taking silver in singles. That year, he also won the European singles and doubles titles, again partnering Cocciolo in doubles, in 's-Hertogenbosch.

In May 2022, Rizzi announced that he would leave GSP Ventimiglia to join French club Fréjus International Pétanque the following season, where his teammates would include Dylan Rocher and Stéphane Robineau. In 2023, he and Rocher won the French doubles championship. He also earned silver in triples and bronze in precision shooting at the 2023 European Championships in Albertville.

At the 2024 World Championships in Dijon, Rizzi won the triples title alongside Andrea Chiapello, Alessio Cocciolo and Davide Laforè, Italy's first victory in the event since 1979.

In September 2025, he won the men's singles world title in Rome, defeating Madagascar's Joseph Ramnointiara 13–8 in the final and becoming the first Italian to win the men's singles world championship in pétanque. At the same tournament, he also won bronze in doubles with Cocciolo. He additionally won bronze in precision shooting at the European Championships in Santa Susanna that year.

At the 2026 Mediterranean Games in Taranto, Rizzi won both pétanque events in which he competed. In precision shooting, he defeated Tunisia's Mohamed Khaled Bougriba 49–35 in the semi-final and Spain's Manel Luque Gonzalez 44–30 in the final. In doubles, partnering Andrea Chiapello, he won the final 9–4 against Spain's Luque Gonzalez and Sergi Ruiz Alvarez.

== Medal record ==
The following is a list of Rizzi's international medals:

=== World Championships ===
==== Senior ====
- 2012 Marseille – bronze, triples.
- 2015 Nice – bronze, singles.
- 2016 Antananarivo – bronze, precision shooting.
- 2017 Ghent – silver, singles.
- 2018 Desbiens – bronze, precision shooting.
- 2019 Almería – silver, doubles.
- 2021 Santa Susanna – silver, precision shooting.
- 2021 Santa Susanna – bronze, triples.
- 2022 Karlslunde – gold, doubles.
- 2022 Karlslunde – silver, singles.
- 2024 Dijon – gold, triples.
- 2025 Rome – gold, singles.
- 2025 Rome – bronze, doubles.

==== Junior ====
- 2009 Monastir – gold, under-18 triples.
- 2009 Monastir – bronze, under-18 precision shooting.
- 2011 Kemer – gold, under-18 precision shooting.

=== European Championships ===
- 2013 Rome – silver, precision shooting.
- 2013 Rome – bronze, triples.
- 2015 Albena – gold, precision shooting.
- 2017 Saint-Pierre-lès-Elbeuf – silver, triples.
- 2017 Saint-Pierre-lès-Elbeuf – bronze, precision shooting.
- 2018 Savigliano – gold, singles.
- 2019 Albena – gold, triples.
- 2019 Albena – gold, precision shooting.
- 2022 ’s-Hertogenbosch – gold, singles.
- 2022 ’s-Hertogenbosch – gold, doubles.
- 2023 Albertville – silver, triples.
- 2023 Albertville – bronze, precision shooting.
- 2025 Santa Susanna – bronze, precision shooting.

=== World Games ===
- 2017 Wrocław – gold, doubles.
- 2017 Wrocław – bronze, precision shooting.

=== Mediterranean Games ===
- 2013 Mersin – gold, doubles.
- 2018 Tarragona – gold, precision shooting.
- 2018 Tarragona – silver, doubles.
- 2026 Taranto – gold, precision shooting.
- 2026 Taranto – gold, doubles.

== Honours ==
During his career, Rizzi has received the following Medaglie al valore atletico (Athletic Merit Medals) from the Italian National Olympic Committee:

- 2013 – Bronze medal, for finishing second at the European Championships and winning the Italian singles precision shooting title.
- 2014 – Bronze medal, for winning the Italian singles precision shooting title.
- 2015 – Silver medal, for winning the European singles precision shooting title.
- 2016 – Silver medal, for finishing third at the World Championships in singles precision shooting.
- 2018 – Silver medal, for winning the European singles title.
- 2019 – Silver medal, for finishing second at the World Championships and winning European titles in pétanque doubles, team and precision shooting.
- 2021 – Silver medal, for finishing second at the World Championships in singles precision shooting.
- 2022 – Gold medal, for winning the world doubles title.
- 2024 – Gold medal, for winning the world triples title.
