= Swimming at the 2026 Mediterranean Games – Women's 100 metre butterfly =

Women's 100 metre butterfly at the 2026 Mediterranean Games
- Venue: Stadio del nuoto Torre d'Ayala
- Location: Taranto, Italy
- Dates: 23 August
- Competitors: 14 from 10 nations
- Winning time: 58.17

Medalists
gold medal	Anna Ntountounaki	Greece
silver medal	Georgia Damasioti	Greece
bronze medal	Paola Borrelli	Italy

The women's 100 metre butterfly competition at the 2026 Mediterranean Games was held on 23 August at the Torre d'Ayala Swimming Stadium in Taranto.

== Records ==
Prior to this competition, the existing world and Mediterranean Games records were as follows:

World record	Gretchen Walsh (USA)	54.33	Fort Lauderdale, United States	2 May 2026
Mediterranean Games record	Lana Pudar (BIH)	57.55	Oran, Algeria	4 July 2022

== Results ==
=== Heats ===
Heats were started at 10:10.

Rank	Heat	Lane	Name	Nationality	Time	Notes
1	2	3	Sofia Sartori	Italy	59.54	q
2	1	5	Paola Borrelli	Italy	59.57	q
3	1	4	Georgia Damasioti	Greece	59.77	q
4	2	4	Anna Ntountounaki	Greece	59.90	q
5	2	6	Naiara Sobreviela	Spain	1:00.06	q
6	2	5	Amina Kajtaz	Croatia	1:00.53	q
7	1	3	Mariana Pacheco de Sousa	Portugal	1:00.91	q
8	2	2	Dila Gençay	Turkey	1:02.88	q
9	2	7	Zala Mojsilović	Slovenia	1:02.94	
10	1	7	Loricia Awad	Lebanon	1:03.15	
11	1	2	Ines Jacinto Henriques	Portugal	1:03.61	
12	2	1	Alisa Enercan	Turkey	1:04.59	
13	1	6	Nina Stanisavljević	Serbia	1:05.85	
14	1	1	Margherita Gregoroni	San Marino	1:09.73	

=== Final ===
Final will be held at 18:06.

Rank	Lane	Name	Nationality	Time	Notes
1st place, gold medalist(s)	6	Anna Ntountounaki	Greece	58.17	
2nd place, silver medalist(s)	3	Georgia Damasioti	Greece	58.49	
3rd place, bronze medalist(s)	5	Paola Borrelli	Italy	59.13	
4	7	Amina Kajtaz	Croatia	59.17	
5	4	Sofia Sartori	Italy	59.35	
6	2	Naiara Sobreviela	Spain	1:00.06	
7	1	Mariana Pacheco de Sousa	Portugal	1:00.52	
8	8	Dila Gençay	Turkey	1:02.25	
