= Panayiotis Loizides =

Panayiotis Loizides may refer to:

- Panayiotis Loizides (footballer) (born 1995), Cypriot footballer
- Panayiotis Loizides (businessman), Cypriot businessman
