= Swimming at the 2026 Mediterranean Games – Men's 50 metre freestyle =

Men's 50 metre freestyle at the 2026 Mediterranean Games
- Location: Taranto, Italy
- Dates: 25 August
- Competitors: 18 from 13 nations
- Winning time: 21.96

Medalists
gold medal	Giovanni Guatti	Italy
silver medal	Lorenzo Ballarati	Italy
bronze medal	Luca Cvetko	Croatia

The Men's 50 metre freestyle competition at the 2026 Mediterranean Games was held on 25 August 2026 at the Torre d'Ayala Swimming Stadium in Taranto.

== Records ==
Prior to this competition, the existing world and Mediterranean Games records were as follows:

World record	Cameron McEvoy (AUS)	20.88	Shenzhen, China	20 March 2026
Mediterranean Games record	Frédérick Bousquet (FRA)	21.17	Pescara, Italy	28 June 2009

== Results ==
=== Heats ===
The heats were started at 10:21.

Rank	Heat	Lane	Swimmer	Nation	Time	Notes
1	3	5	Lorenzo Ballarati	Italy	22.02	Q
2	2	4	Giovanni Guatti	Italy	22.16	Q
3	2	5	Luca Cvetko	Croatia	22.21	Q
4	3	4	Abdelrahman Sameh	Egypt	22.31	Q
5	3	6	Mehdi Benfekih	Algeria	22.40	Q
6	1	6	Efe Hacısalihoğlu	Turkey	22.50	Q
7	2	3	Youssef Ramadan	Egypt	22.70	Q
8	1	4	Božo Puhalović	Croatia	22.73	Q
9	2	6	Josep Castro	Spain	22.80	
10	3	3	Andreas Vazaios	Greece	22.85	
11	3	2	Marwane Sebbata	Morocco	22.88	
12	1	2	Andrew Laghoutis	Cyprus	23.03	
13	2	2	Emre Sakçı	Turkey	23.22	
14	3	7	Jovan Jankovski	North Macedonia	23.28	
15	1	3	Justin Cvetkov	Serbia	23.38	
16	1	7	Farid Zeidan	Lebanon	23.56	
17	3	1	Stefan Todorov	North Macedonia	23.93	
18	2	1	Dior Krasniqi	Kosovo	24.97	
	2	7	Nikolas Antoniou	Cyprus	Did not start	
	1	5	Stergios Bilas	Greece	Did not start	

=== Final ===
The final was held at 18:13.

Rank	Lane	Name	Nationality	Time	Notes
1st place, gold medalist(s)	5	Giovanni Guatti	Italy	21.96	
2nd place, silver medalist(s)	4	Lorenzo Ballarati	Italy	22.00	
3rd place, bronze medalist(s)	3	Luca Cvetko	Croatia	22.16	
4	6	Abdelrahman Sameh	Egypt	22.24	
5	2	Mehdi Benfekih	Algeria	22.33	
6	1	Youssef Ramadan	Egypt	22.64	
7	7	Efe Hacısalihoğlu	Turkey	22.85	
8	8	Božo Puhalović	Croatia	22.86	
