= Swimming at the 2026 Mediterranean Games – Women's 200 metre breaststroke =

Women's 200 metre breaststroke at the 2026 Mediterranean Games
- Venue: Stadio del nuoto Torre d'Ayala
- Location: Taranto, Italy
- Dates: 23 August
- Competitors: 11 from 9 nations
- Winning time: 2:24.27

Medalists
gold medal	Lisa Angiolini	Italy
silver medal	Ana Blažević	Croatia
bronze medal	Francesca Zucca	Italy

The Women's 200 metre breaststroke competition at the 2026 Mediterranean Games was held on 23 August 2026 at the Torre d'Ayala Swimming Stadium in Taranto, Italy.

== Records ==
Prior to this competition, the existing world and Mediterranean Games records were as follows:

World record	Evgeniia Chikunova (RUS)	2:17.55	Kazan, Russia	21 April 2023
Mediterranean Games record	Jessica Vall (ESP)	2:25.22	Tarragona, Spain	23 June 2018

During the competition, Lisa Angiolini set a new Mediterranean Games record of 2:24.27 in the final.

== Results ==
=== Heats ===
The heats were started at 10:49.

Rank	Heat	Lane	Name	Nationality	Time	Notes
1	1	4	Ana Blažević	Croatia	2:28.61	q
2	2	4	Lisa Angiolini	Italy	2:29.47	q
3	1	5	Aina Fernández González	Spain	2:30.08	q
4	1	6	Maria Erokhina	Cyprus	2:30.37	q
5	2	3	Meriç Uygun	Turkey	2:30.38	q
6	2	2	Lynn El Hajj	Lebanon	2:30.42	q
7	2	5	Francesca Zucca	Italy	2:31.06	q
8	1	3	Eleni Kontogeorgou	Greece	2:31.67	q
9	2	6	Martina Bukvic	Serbia	2:35.67	R1
	2	7	Habiba Belghith	Tunisia	Did not start	
	1	2	Pinar Dönmez	Turkey	Did not start	

=== Final ===
The final was held at 18:48.

Rank	Lane	Name	Nationality	Time	Notes
1st place, gold medalist(s)	5	Lisa Angiolini	Italy	2:24.27	CR
2nd place, silver medalist(s)	4	Ana Blažević	Croatia	2:27.63	
3rd place, bronze medalist(s)	1	Francesca Zucca	Italy	2:28.46	
4	2	Meriç Uygun	Turkey	2:29.61	
5	7	Lynn El Hajj	Lebanon	2:29.62	
6	3	Aina Fernández González	Spain	2:29.93	
7	6	Maria Erokhina	Cyprus	2:31.47	
8	8	Eleni Kontogeorgou	Greece	2:32.83	
