= Croatian Swimming Federation =

National sports federation

LEN
- Association crest
- Founded: 5 October 1909
- FINA affiliation: 7 February 1992
- LEN affiliation: 7 February 1992
- Website: www.hrvatski-plivacki-savez.hr
- President: Vladislav Veselica

Croatian Swimming Federation, also known as Croatian Swimming Association (Croatian: Hrvatski plivački savez, HPS) is the national sports federation tasked with the development, promotion and international representation of swimming in Croatia. It is a member of the Croatian Olympic Committee.

As of 2016, the Federation's President is Ivan Varvodić.

== Medalists at Olympic Games ==
#	Swimmer	Gold	Silver	Bronze	Total
Freestyle
1	Duje Draganja	0	1	0	1

== Medalists at World Championships ==
LONG course
#	Swimmer	Gold	Silver	Bronze	Total
Freestyle
1	Duje Draganja	0	1	0	1
Backstroke
1	Gordan Kožulj	0	1	0	1
SHORT course
#	Swimmer	Gold	Silver	Bronze	Total
Freestyle
1	Duje Draganja	2	0	1	3
Backstroke
1	Sanja Jovanović	1	0	1	2
2	Gordan Kožulj	1	0	0	1
3	Marko Strahija	0	1	0	1
Butterfly
1	Miloš Milošević	1	0	0	1
2	Duje Draganja	0	0	1	1
