= Swimming at the 2026 Mediterranean Games – Men's 50 metre backstroke =

Men's 50 metre backstroke at the 2026 Mediterranean Games
- Location: Taranto, Italy
- Dates: 23 August
- Competitors: 12 from 8 nations
- Winning time: 24.74

Medalists
gold medal	Apostolos Christou	Greece
silver medal	Francesco Lazzari	Italy
bronze medal	Nikola Miljenić	Croatia

The men's 50 metre backstroke competition at the 2026 Mediterranean Games will be held on 23 August at the Torre d'Ayala Swimming Stadium in Taranto.

== Records ==
Prior to this competition, the existing world and Mediterranean Games records were as follows:

World record	Kliment Kolesnikov (RUS)	23.55	Kazan, Russia	27 July 2023
Mediterranean Games record	Aschwin Wildeboer (ESP)	24.73	Pescara, Italy	27 June 2009

== Results ==
=== Heats ===
Heats were started at 10:05.

Rank	Heat	Lane	Name	Nationality	Time	Notes
1	2	4	Apostolos Christou	Greece	24.97	q
2	1	5	Evangelos Makrygiannis	Greece	25.30	q
3	1	4	Francesco Lazzari	Italy	25.40	q
4	2	6	Nikola Miljenić	Croatia	25.45	q
5	2	5	Mert Ali Satir	Turkey	25.53	q
6	2	3	Daniele Del Signore	Italy	25.57	q
7	1	6	Luka Čarapović	Croatia	25.69	q
8	1	3	João Nogueira da Costa	Portugal	25.71	q
9	2	2	Berke Saka	Turkey	26.17	
10	2	7	Ahmad Safie	Lebanon	26.19	
11	1	7	Ricardo Matias Santos	Portugal	26.33	
12	1	2	Abdellah Ardjoune	Algeria	26.64	

=== Final ===
Final will be held at 18:03.

Rank	Lane	Name	Nationality	Time	Notes
1st place, gold medalist(s)	4	Apostolos Christou	Greece	24.74	
2nd place, silver medalist(s)	3	Francesco Lazzari	Italy	25.12	
3rd place, bronze medalist(s)	6	Nikola Miljenić	Croatia	25.28	NR
4	7	Daniel Del Signore	Italy	25.35	
5	5	Evangelos Makrygiannis	Greece	25.36	
6	1	Luka Čarapović	Croatia	25.45	
6	2	Mert Ali Satir	Turkey	25.45	
8	8	João Nogueira da Costa	Portugal	25.72	
