= Desbiens =

Desbiens may refer to:

- Desbiens, Quebec, a ville in the Canadian province of Quebec
- Ann-Renée Desbiens, Canadian ice hockey player
- Caroline Desbiens, Canadian politician
- Guillaume Desbiens, Canadian ice hockey player
- Hubert Desbiens (1931–2009), Canadian politician
- Jean-Paul Desbiens, Canadian writer, journalist, teacher
- Jonathan Desbiens, Canadian filmmaker
- Laurent Desbiens, former French cyclist
