= Swimming at the 2026 Mediterranean Games – Women's 200 metre butterfly =

Women's 200 metre butterfly at the 2026 Mediterranean Games
- Location: Taranto, Italy
- Dates: 25 August
- Competitors: 10 from 8 nations
- Winning time: 2:08.47

Medalists
gold medal	Paola Borrelli	Italy
silver medal	Georgia Damasioti	Greece
bronze medal	Paula González	Spain

The Women's 200 metre butterfly competition at the 2026 Mediterranean Games was held on 25 August 2026 at the Torre d'Ayala Swimming Stadium in Taranto.

== Records ==
Prior to this competition, the existing world and Mediterranean Games record were as follows:

World record	Summer McIntosh (CAN)	2:01.65	Montréal, Canada	5 July 2026
Mediterranean Games record	Caterina Giacchetti (ITA)	2:06.89	Pescara, Italy	1 July 2009

== Results ==
=== Heats ===
The heats were started at 10:29.

Rank	Heat	Lane	Swimmer	Nation	Time	Notes
1	2	4	Paola Borrelli	Italy	2:10.25	q
2	2	5	Sofia Sartori	Italy	2:13.06	q
3	2	3	Paula González	Spain	2:13.40	q
4	1	4	Georgia Damasioti	Greece	2:13.62	q
5	1	6	Ines Jacinto Henriques	Portugal	2:13.86	q
6	2	6	Alisa Enercan	Turkey	2:15.35	q
7	1	5	Pacheco Se Sousa Almeida	Portugal	2:15.98	q
8	1	3	Amina Kajtaz Pinjo	Croatia	2:17.40	q
9	2	2	Zala Mojsilovic Meznaric	Slovenia	2:18.22	
10	1	2	Angela Doumanian	Lebanon	2:25.36	

=== Final ===
The final was held at 18:28.

Rank	Lane	Swimmer	Nation	Time	Notes
1st place, gold medalist(s)	4	Paola Borrelli	Italy	2:08.47	
2nd place, silver medalist(s)	6	Georgia Damasioti	Greece	2:09.73	
3rd place, bronze medalist(s)	3	Paula González	Spain	2:11.10	
4	5	Sofia Sartori	Italy	2:12.43	
5	2	Ines Jacinto Henriques	Portugal	2:13.77	
6	7	Alisa Enercan	Turkey	2:14.85	
7	8	Amina Kajtaz Pinjo	Croatia	2:15.03	
8	1	Pacheco Se Sousa Almeida	Portugal	2:15.08	
