= Swimming at the 2026 Mediterranean Games – Men's 200 metre breaststroke =

Men's 200 metre breaststroke at the 2026 Mediterranean Games
- Location: Taranto, Italy
- Dates: 23 August
- Competitors: 12 from 8 nations
- Winning time: 2:10.79

Medalists
gold medal	Doruk Yoğurtçuoğlu	Turkey
silver medal	Christian Mantegazza	Italy
bronze medal	Filip Mujan	Croatia

The Men's 200 metre breaststroke competition at the 2026 Mediterranean Games was held on 23 August 2026 at the Torre d'Ayala Swimming Stadium in Taranto.

== Records ==
Prior to this competition, the existing world and Mediterranean Games record were as follows:

World record	Qin Haiyang (CHN)	2:05.48	Fukuoka, Japan	28 July 2023
Mediterranean Games record	Melquíades Álvarez (ESP)	2:09.69	Pescara, Italy	30 June 2009

== Results ==
=== Heats ===
The heats were started at 10:57.

Rank	Heat	Lane	Name	Nationality	Time	Notes
1	1	3	Andrea Prapugicu	Italy	2:13.27	q
2	1	4	Christian Mantegazza	Italy	2:13.74	q
3	1	5	Filip Mujan	Croatia	2:13.98	q
4	2	6	Savvas Thomoglou	Greece	2:15.47	q
5	2	5	Kerem İlyem	Turkey	2:15.61	q
6	2	4	Doruk Yoğurtçuoğlu	Turkey	2:15.82	q
7	2	3	Marios Zafeiropoulos	Greece	2:16.63	q
8	2	2	Giacomo Casadei	San Marino	2:17.51	q
9	1	6	Jaš Berložnik	Slovenia	2:17.70	
10	1	2	Ramzi Chouchar	Algeria	2:19.33	
11	2	7	Vito Radoš	Croatia	2:23.27	
12	1	7	Youssef Abboud	Lebanon	2:28.95	

=== Final ===
The final were held at 18:53

Rank	Lane	Name	Nationality	Time	Notes
1st place, gold medalist(s)	7	Doruk Yoğurtçuoğlu	Turkey	2:10.79	
2nd place, silver medalist(s)	5	Christian Mantegazza	Italy	2:11.10	
3rd place, bronze medalist(s)	3	Filip Mujan	Croatia	2:11.14	NR
4	2	Kerem İlyem	Turkey	2:11.67	
5	4	Andrea Prapugicu	Italy	2:12.53	
6	6	Savvas Thomoglou	Greece	2:12.66	
7	8	Giacomo Casadei	San Marino	2:16.72	
8	1	Marios Zafeiropoulos	Greece	2:18.09	
