= Swimming at the 2026 Mediterranean Games – Men's 200 metre backstroke =

Men's 200 metre backstroke at the 2026 Mediterranean Games
- Location: Taranto, Italy
- Dates: 22 August
- Competitors: 11 from 9 nations
- Winning time: 1:55.95

Medalists
gold medal	Apostolos Siskos	Greece
silver medal	Matteo Venini	Italy
bronze medal	Mohamed Yassin Ben Abbes	Tunisia

The men's 200 metre backstroke competition at the 2026 Mediterranean Games was held on 22 August at the Torre d'Ayala Swimming Stadium in Taranto.

== Records ==
Prior to this competition, the existing world and Mediterranean Games records were as follows:

World record	Aaron Peirsol (USA)	1:51.92	Rome, Italy	31 July 2009
Mediterranean Games record	Aschwin Wildeboer (ESP)	1:54.96	Pescara, Italy	28 June 2009

== Results ==
=== Heats ===
Heats were started at 10:53.

Rank	Heat	Lane	Name	Nationality	Time	Notes
=1	1	5	Mohamed Yassin Ben Abbes	Tunisia	2:00.32	q
=1	1	6	Ricardo Matias Santos	Portugal	2:00.32	q
3	2	5	Matteo Venini	Italy	2:00.98	q
4	2	6	Primož Senica Pavletic	Slovenia	2:01.14	q
5	1	4	Daniele Del Signore	Italy	2:01.29	q
6	2	4	Apostolos Siskos	Greece	2:01.86	q
7	2	3	Diego Mira	Spain	2:02.49	q
8	1	3	Apostolos Papastamos	Greece	2:03.78	q
9	2	7	Abdellah Ardjoune	Algeria	2:05.05	R1
10	2	2	Berke Saka	Turkey	2:05.76	R2
11	1	2	Luka Čarapović	Croatia	2:05.82	

=== Final ===
The final was held at 18:37.

Rank	Lane	Name	Nationality	Time	Notes
1st place, gold medalist(s)	7	Apostolos Siskos	Greece	1:55.95	
2nd place, silver medalist(s)	3	Matteo Venini	Italy	1:57.28	
3rd place, bronze medalist(s)	4	Mohamed Yassin Ben Abbes	Tunisia	1:59.43	
4	5	Ricardo Matias Santos	Portugal	1:59.55	
5	1	Diego Mira	Spain	1:59.81	
6	6	Primož Senica Pavletic	Slovenia	2:00.11	
7	2	Daniele Del Signore	Italy	2:00.60	
8	8	Apostolos Papastamos	Greece	2:03.40	
