= Georgia Damasioti =

Greek swimmer

Personal information
- Nationality: Greek
- Born: 2 July 2003 (age 23)

Sport
- Sport: Swimming
Medal record
Women's swimming
Representing Greece
European Championships (LC)
Silver medal – second place	2024 Belgrade	100 m butterfly
Mediterranean Games
Silver medal – second place	2026 Taranto	100 m butterfly
Silver medal – second place	2026 Taranto	200 m butterfly
European U23 Championships
Gold medal – first place	2025 Samorin	200 m butterfly
Silver medal – second place	2025 Samorin	100 m butterfly

Georgia Damasioti (born 2 July 2003) is a Greek competitive swimmer.

== Career ==
In June 2024, Georgia competed in the European Aquatics Championships in Belgrade, Serbia, placing 2nd in the 100m butterfly with a time of 57.74, which earned her a qualification for the Paris 2024 Olympics.

She represented Greece at the 2024 Summer Olympics, where she competed in the 200m butterfly, placing 15th in the semifinals in a time of 2:10.25. She also competed in 100m butterfly and placed 23rd with a time of 58.72.
