= Swimming at the 2026 Mediterranean Games – Men's 100 metre backstroke =

Men's 100 metre backstroke at the 2026 Mediterranean Games
- Location: Taranto, Italy
- Dates: 25 August
- Competitors: 13 from 10 nations
- Winning time: 52.34

Medalists
gold medal	Apostolos Christou	Greece
silver medal	Francesco Lazzari	Italy
bronze medal	Evangelos Makrygiannis	Greece

The men's 100 metre backstroke competition at the 2026 Mediterranean Games was held on 25 August 2026 at the Torre d'Ayala Swimming Stadium in Taranto.

== Records ==
Prior to this competition, the existing world and Mediterranean Games records were as follows:

World record	Thomas Ceccon (ITA)	51.60	Budapest, Hungary	20 June 2022
Mediterranean Games record	Aschwin Wildeboer (ESP)	52.38	Pescara, Italy	1 July 2009

During the competition, Apostolos Christou broke the Mediterranean Games record in the final, winning the gold medal in 52.34. He improved the previous record of 52.38, set by Aschwin Wildeboer at the 2009 Mediterranean Games, by 0.04 seconds.

Record	Athlete	Time	Location	Date	Improvement
Mediterranean Games record	Apostolos Christou (GRE)	52.34	Taranto, Italy	25 August 2026	−0.04 s

== Results ==
=== Heats ===
The heats were held at 10:51.

Rank	Heat	Lane	Name	Nationality	Time	Notes
1	2	5	Francesco Lazzari	Italy	55.34	q
2	2	6	João Nogueira da Costa	Portugal	55.45	q
3	1	5	Daniele Del Signore	Italy	55.48	q
4	2	4	Apostolos Christou	Greece	55.52	q
5	1	4	Evangelos Makrygiannis	Greece	55.62	q
6	1	3	Mert Ali Satır	Turkey	55.72	q
7	1	7	Ricardo Matias Santos	Portugal	56.11	q
8	1	6	Luka Čarapović	Croatia	56.33	q
9	1	2	Primož Senica Pavletic	Slovenia	56.56	R1
10	2	3	Teo Del Riego Torres	Spain	56.62	R2
11	2	7	Abdellah Ardjoune	Algeria	57.07	
12	2	2	Mohamed Yassin Ben Abbes	Tunisia	57.10	
13	2	1	Ahmad Safie	Lebanon	57.25	

=== Final ===
The final was held at 18:54.

Rank	Lane	Name	Nationality	Time	Notes
1st place, gold medalist(s)	6	Apostolos Christou	Greece	52.34	GR
2nd place, silver medalist(s)	4	Francesco Lazzari	Italy	54.28	
3rd place, bronze medalist(s)	2	Evangelos Makrygiannis	Greece	54.54	
4	3	Daniele Del Signore	Italy	54.62	
5	7	Mert Ali Satır	Turkey	55.15	
6	5	João Nogueira da Costa	Portugal	55.18	
7	8	Luka Čarapović	Croatia	55.29	
8	1	Ricardo Matias Santos	Portugal	55.99	
