= Franko Grgić =

Croatian swimmer (born 2003)

Personal information
- National team: Croatia
- Born: 31 January 2003 (age 23) Split, Croatia

Sport
- Sport: Swimming
- Strokes: Freestyle
- Club: Jadran Split
Medal record
Men's swimming
Representing Croatia
World Junior Championships
Gold medal – first place	2019 Budapest	800 m freestyle
Gold medal – first place	2019 Budapest	1500 m freestyle
European Youth Olympic Festival
Gold medal – first place	2019 Baku	400 m freestyle
Gold medal – first place	2019 Baku	1500 m freestyle

Franko Grgić (born 31 January 2003) is a Croatian competitive swimmer in freestyle.

Grgić won the gold medal both in the 800 m freestyle and the 1500 m freestyle event at the 2019 FINA World Junior Swimming Championships in Budapest, Hungary. With the time of 14:46.09 in World Junior Championship he is the fastest 16-year-old 1500m freestyle swimmer in history. He captured two gold medals in the 400 m freestyle and the 1500 m freestyle event at the 2019 European Youth Summer Olympic Festival (EYOF) in Baku, Azerbaijan. In 2019 he was nominated for the Piotr Nurowski “Best European Young Athlete” Prize awarded by the European Olympic Committees, subsequently he was awarded second place. In the same year he was awarded the best young Croatian athlete by the famous Sportske novosti magazine.
