= Nikola Miljenić =

Croatian swimmer (born 1998)

Personal information
- Nationality: Croatian
- Born: 19 May 1998 (age 28) Zagreb, Croatia

Sport
- Sport: Swimming
- College team: Indiana University Bloomington (2017–2018); University of Southern California (2018–2021)
Medal record
Men's swimming
Representing Croatia
European Championships (SC)
Bronze medal – third place	2025 Lublin	4×50 m freestyle
Mediterranean Games
Bronze medal – third place	2026 Taranto	50 m backstroke

Nikola Miljenić (born 19 May 1998) is a Croatian swimmer. At the 2020 Summer Olympics, he competed in the men's 100 metre freestyle, 50 metre freestyle, and 100 metre butterfly events. At the 2024 Summer Olympics, he competed in the men's 100-metre freestyle and 100-metre butterfly events.
