= Tennis at the 2026 Mediterranean Games – Men's doubles =

Tennis tournament at 2026 Mediterranean Games

Men's doubles
- Tennis at the 2026 Mediterranean Games

Events
| Singles | men | women |
| Doubles | men | women | mixed |
- Mediterranean Games

The men's doubles event at the 2026 Mediterranean Games was held from 26 to 30 August 2026 at the Magna Grecia Tennis Center.

Yassine Dlimi and Younes Lalami of Morocco won the gold medal, defeating Alex Marti Pujolras and Alejo Sánchez Quílez of Spain, 7–5, 6–4.

Menelaos Efstathiou and Eleftherios Neos of Cyprus won the bronze medal, defeating Alex De Gabriele and Liam Delicata of Malta, 6–3, 3–6, [10–6].

== Medalists ==
| Gold | Silver | Bronze |
|---|---|---|
| Yassine Dlimi and Younes Lalami; Morocco | Alex Marti Pujolras and Alejo Sánchez Quílez; Spain | Menelaos Efstathiou and Eleftherios Neos; Cyprus |

== Seeds ==
All four seeds received a bye into the quartefinals.

1. (Turkey) Mert Alkaya / (Turkey) Arda Azkara (quarterfinals)
2. (Italy) Carlo Alberto Caniato / (Italy) Filippo Romano (quarterfinals)
3. (Cyprus) Menelaos Efstathiou / (Cyprus) Eleftherios Neos (semifinal; bronze medalist)
4. (Spain) Alex Marti Pujolras / (Spain) Alejo Sánchez Quílez (final; silver medalist)

== Draw ==
First round 26 August
Y Dlimi (MAR); Y Lalami (MAR) | w/o
D Azoidis (GRE); I Xilas (GRE)

Quarterfinals; 27 August
1 | M Alkaya (TUR); A Azkara (TUR) | 1 | 6 | [7]
Y Dlimi (MAR); Y Lalami (MAR) | 6 | 3 | [10]
3 | M Efstathiou (CYP); E Neos (CYP) | 6 | 6
J Jakupi (KOS); F Limani (KOS) | 1 | 1
W Abderrahman (TUN); A Ouakaa (TUN) | 3 | 6 | [2]
4 | A Pujolras (ESP); A Sánchez (ESP) | 6 | 2 | [10]
A De Gabriele (MLT); L Delicata (MLT) | 3 | 7 | [10]
2 | CA Caniato (ITA); F Romano (ITA) | 6 | 5 | [3]

Semifinals; 29 August
Y Dlimi (MAR); Y Lalami (MAR) | 6^{5} | 7 | [12]
3 | M Efstathiou (CYP); E Neos (CYP) | 7^{7} | 5 | [10]
4 | A Pujolras (ESP); A Sánchez (ESP) | 6 | 6
A De Gabriele (MLT); L Delicata (MLT) | 2 | 2

Finals; 30 August
Y Dlimi (MAR); Y Lalami (MAR) | 7 | 6
4 | A Pujolras (ESP); A Sánchez (ESP) | 5 | 4
Bronze medal match 30 June
3 | M Efstathiou (CYP); E Neos (CYP) | 3 | 6 | [10]
A De Gabriele (MLT); L Delicata (MLT) | 6 | 3 | [6]

== External link ==
- Draw
