= Tennis at the 2026 Mediterranean Games – Women's doubles =

Tennis tournament at 2026 Mediterranean Games

Women's doubles
- Tennis at the 2026 Mediterranean Games

Events
Singles	men	women
Doubles	men	women	mixed
- Mediterranean Games

The women's doubles event at the 2026 Mediterranean Games was held from 28 to 30 August 2026 at the Magna Grecia Tennis Center.

Elena Korokozidi and Martha Matoula of Greece won the gold medal, defeating Noemi Basiletti and Vittoria Paganetti of Italy, 6–4, 7–5.

Çağla Büyükakçay and Berfu Cengiz of Turkey won the bronze medal, defeating Lucía Cortez Llorca and Maria García Cid of Spain, 6–2, 6–2.

== Medalists ==
Gold	Silver	Bronze
Elena Korokozidi and Martha Matoula; Greece	Noemi Basiletti and Vittoria Paganetti; Italy	Çağla Büyükakçay and Berfu Cengiz; Turkey

== Seeds ==
Both seeds received a bye into the semifinals.

1. (Greece) Elena Korokozidi / (Greece) Martha Matoula (champion; gold medalist)
2. (Italy) Noemi Basiletti / (Italy) Vittoria Paganetti (final; silver medalist)

== Draw ==
Quarterfinals; 28 August
Ç Büyükakçay (TUR); B Cengiz (TUR)	7^{8}	6
D El Jardi (MAR); Y Kabbaj (MAR)	6^{6}	3
A Papakyriacou (CYP); R Serban (CYP)	1	1
L Cortez Llorca (ESP); M García Cid (ESP)	6	6

Semifinals; 29 August
1	E Korokozidi (GRE); M Matoula (GRE)	6	6
Ç Büyükakçay (TUR); B Cengiz (TUR)	2	1
L Cortez Llorca (ESP); M García Cid (ESP)	1	6^{6}
2	N Basiletti (ITA); V Paganetti (ITA)	6	7^{8}

Finals; 30 August
1	E Korokozidi (GRE); M Matoula (GRE)	6	7
2	N Basiletti (ITA); V Paganetti (ITA)	4	5
Bronze medal match 30 August
Ç Büyükakçay (TUR); B Cengiz (TUR)	6	6
L Cortez Llorca (ESP); M García Cid (ESP)	2	2

== External link ==
- Draw
