= Tennis at the 2026 Mediterranean Games – Men's singles =

Tennis tournament at 2026 Mediterranean Games

Men's singles
- Tennis at the 2026 Mediterranean Games

Events
Singles	men	women
Doubles	men	women	mixed
- Mediterranean Games

The men's singles event at the 2026 Mediterranean Games was held from 25 to 31 August at the Magna Grecia Tennis Center.

Karim Bennani of Morocco won the gold medal, defeating Alejo Sánchez Quílez of Spain in the final, 2–6, 6–3, 6–4.

Carlo Alberto Caniato of Italy won the bronze medal, defeating Francisco Rocha of Portugal in the bronze medal match, 6–3, 6–1.

== Medalists ==
Gold	Silver	Bronze
Karim Bennani; Morocco	Alejo Sánchez Quílez; Spain	Carlo Alberto Caniato; Italy

== Seeds ==
All eight seeds received a bye into the second round.

1. (Turkey) Mert Alkaya (second round)
2. (Italy) Filippo Romano (second round)
3. (Greece) Ioannis Xilas (second round; retired)
4. (Spain) Alejo Sánchez Quílez (final; silver medalist)
5. (Morocco) Karim Bennani (champion; gold medalist)
6. (Italy) Carlo Alberto Caniato (semifinal; bronze medalist)
7. (Morocco) Yassine Dimli (quarterfinals)
8. (Tunisia) Aziz Ouakaa (second round)

== Draw ==
=== Finals ===
Semifinals; 30 August
6	Carlo Alberto Caniato (ITA)	4	2
4	Alejo Sánchez Quílez (ESP)	6	6
5	Karim Bennani (MAR)	6	6
Francisco Rocha (POR)	1	4

Final; 31 August
4	Alejo Sánchez Quílez (ESP)	6	3	4
5	Karim Bennani (MAR)	2	6	6
Bronze medal match
6	Carlo Alberto Caniato (ITA)	6	6
Francisco Rocha (POR)	3	1

=== Top half ===
First round 25 August
A De Gabriele (MLT)	0	5
W Abderrahman (TUN)	6	7
P Jovanović (MNE)	0
D Azoidis (GRE)	0^{r}
K Janev (MKD)	2	2
A Timini (CYP)	6	6

Second round 28 August
1	M Alkaya (TUR)	2	6	5
W Abderrahman (TUN)	6	4	7
F Limani (KOS)	3	0
6	CA Caniato (ITA)	6	6
4	A Sánchez Quílez (ESP)	6	6
P Jovanović (MNE)	3	4
A Timini (CYP)	3	1
7	Y Dimli (MAR)	6	6

Quarterfinals; 29 August
W Abderrahman (TUN)	2	4
6	CA Caniato (ITA)	6	6
4	A Sánchez Quílez (ESP)	6	6
7	Y Dimli (MAR)	4	4

Semifinals; 30 June
6	CA Caniato (ITA)	4	2
4	A Sánchez Quílez (ESP)	6	6

=== Top bottom ===
First round 25 August
J Jakupi (KOS)	0	0
L Delicata (MLT)	6	6
ÀM Pujolràs (ESP)	6	1	5
F Rocha (POR)	3	6	7

Second round 28 August
5	K Bennani (MAR)	6	6
M Efstathiou (CYP)	3	4
L Delicata (MLT)	w/o
3	I Xilas (GRE)
8	A Ouakaa (TUN)	2	4
T Duran (TUR)	6	6
F Rocha (POR)	6	6
2	F Romano (ITA)	4	2

Quarterfinals; 29 August
5	K Bennani (MAR)	6	6
L Delicata (MLT)	2	3
T Duran (TUR)	4	4
F Rocha (POR)	6	6

Semifinals; 30 June
5	K Bennani (MAR)	6	6
F Rocha (POR)	1	4
