= 2026 Città di Biella – Singles =

Singles
- 2026 Città di Biella

Final
- Champion: (Italy) Carlo Alberto Caniato
- Runner-up: (Spain) Alejandro Moro Cañas
- Score: 7–6^{(7–1)}, 6–4

Events
Singles	Doubles
- Città di Biella

Stefano Napolitano was the defending champion but lost in the second round to Oriol Roca Batalla.

Carlo Alberto Caniato won the title after defeating Alejandro Moro Cañas 7–6^{(7–1)}, 6–4 in the final.

== Seeds ==
1. (Italy) Gianluca Cadenasso (first round)
2. (United Kingdom) Felix Gill (quarterfinals)
3. (Italy) Stefano Napolitano (second round)
4. (Argentina) Alex Barrena (semifinals)
5. (Spain) Alejandro Moro Cañas (final)
6. (United Kingdom) Jay Clarke (semifinals)
7. (Brazil) João Lucas Reis da Silva (withdrew)
8. (Italy) Franco Agamenone (first round)

== Draw ==
Key

- Q = Qualifier
- WC = Wild card
- LL = Lucky loser
- Alt = Alternate
- ITF = ITF entry
- PR = Protected ranking
- SR = Special ranking
- SE = Special exempt
- JE = Junior exempt
- JR = Junior Accelerator Programme entrant
- CO = College Accelerator Programme entrant
- NG = Next Gen Accelerator Program entrant
- w/o = Walkover
- r = Retired
- d = Defaulted

=== Finals ===
Semifinals
WC	(Italy) Carlo Alberto Caniato	6	6
4	(Argentina) Alex Barrena	3	2
5	(Spain) Alejandro Moro Cañas	6	4	6
6	(United Kingdom) Jay Clarke	3	6	2

Final
WC	(Italy) Carlo Alberto Caniato	7^{7}	6
5	(Spain) Alejandro Moro Cañas	6^{1}	4

=== Top half ===
First round
1	(Italy) G Cadenasso	1	5
(Italy) F Forti	6	7
(Switzerland) M Brunold	6	1	7
WC	(Italy) Massimo Giunta	3	6	5
Q	(Italy) Giuseppe La Vela	4	3
WC	(Italy) CA Caniato	6	6
Q	(Spain) Izan Almazán Valiente	6	6
8	(Italy) F Agamenone	4	3
4	(Argentina) A Barrena	6	1	6
(France) M Chazal	4	6	3
(Italy) G Piraino	7	2	5
(Italy) S Pieri	5	6	7
WC	(Italy) Riccardo Carpano	1	2
(Italy) Tommaso Compagnucci	6	6
Q	(Italy) Pierluigi Basile	2	1
LL	(Italy) Juan Cruz Martin Manzano	6	6

Second round
(Italy) F Forti	2	2
(Switzerland) M Brunold	6	6
WC	(Italy) CA Caniato	6	6
Q	(Spain) I Almazán Valiente	4	3
4	(Argentina) A Barrena	6	6
(Italy) S Pieri	1	3
(Italy) T Compagnucci	4	3
LL	(Italy) JC Martin Manzano	6	6

Quarterfinals
(Switzerland) M Brunold	0	6	4
WC	(Italy) CA Caniato	6	3	6
4	(Argentina) A Barrena	6	6
LL	(Italy) JC Martin Manzano	3	4

Semifinals
WC	(Italy) CA Caniato	6	6
4	(Argentina) A Barrena	3	2

=== Bottom half ===
First round
5	(Spain) A Moro Cañas	6	7^{7}
(France) G Blancaneaux	2	6^{4}
Q	Pavel Lagutin	3	7^{7}	6
(Italy) E Dalla Valle	6	6^{4}	3
(Spain) O Roca Batalla	6	6
(Spain) A Sánchez Quílez	2	2
Q	(Spain) Àlex Martí Pujolràs	4	3
3	(Italy) S Napolitano	6	6
6	(United Kingdom) J Clarke	3	6	6
(Czech Republic) J Forejtek	6	3	4
(Czech Republic) Petr Brunclík	7^{7}	7^{7}
(Italy) F Romano	6^{5}	6^{4}
Q	(South Korea) G Campaña Lee	5	7^{7}	6
(Spain) C Taberner	7	6^{5}	4
(Germany) Mika Petkovic	6^{7}	3
2	(United Kingdom) F Gill	7^{9}	6

Second round
5	(Spain) A Moro Cañas	6	6
Q	P Lagutin	4	3
(Spain) O Roca Batalla	2	6	6
3	(Italy) S Napolitano	6	3	4
6	(United Kingdom) J Clarke	6	7
(Czech Republic) P Brunclík	1	5
Q	(South Korea) G Campaña Lee	0	3
2	(United Kingdom) F Gill	6	6

Quarterfinals
5	(Spain) A Moro Cañas	7^{7}	6
(Spain) O Roca Batalla	6^{4}	4
6	(United Kingdom) J Clarke	6^{3}	6	6
2	(United Kingdom) F Gill	7^{7}	1	3

Semifinals
5	(Spain) A Moro Cañas	6	4	6
6	(United Kingdom) J Clarke	3	6	2
