= 2026 Città di Biella – Doubles =

Doubles
- 2026 Città di Biella

Final
- Champions: (Italy) Francesco Forti (Italy) Filippo Romano
- Runners-up: (Italy) Franco Agamenone (Argentina) Máximo Zeitune
- Score: 4–6, 7–5, [10–8]

Events
| Singles | Doubles |
- Città di Biella

Gianluca Cadenasso and Filippo Romano were the defending champions but only Romano chose to defend his title, partnering Francesco Forti. He successfully defended his title after defeating Franco Agamenone and Máximo Zeitune 4–6, 7–5, [10–8] in the final.

== Seeds ==
1. (Italy) Francesco Forti / (Italy) Filippo Romano (champions)
2. (Venezuela) Juan José Bianchi / (Australia) Kody Pearson (first round)
3. (Spain) Oriol Roca Batalla / (Spain) Alejo Sánchez Quílez (quarterfinals, withdrew)
4. (Italy) Simone Agostini / (Czech Republic) Jonáš Forejtek (first round)

== Draw ==
Key

- Q = Qualifier
- WC = Wild card
- LL = Lucky loser
- Alt = Alternate
- ITF = ITF entry
- PR = Protected ranking
- SR = Special ranking
- SE = Special exempt
- JE = Junior exempt
- JR = Junior Accelerator Programme entrant
- CO = College Accelerator Programme entrant
- NG = Next Gen Accelerator Program entrant
- w/o = Walkover
- r = Retired
- d = Defaulted

First round
1 | (Italy) F Forti (Italy) F Romano | 4 | 6 | [13]
(United Kingdom) J Clarke (United Kingdom) F Gill | 6 | 4 | [11]
PR | (Zimbabwe) B Lock (Zimbabwe) CJ Lock | 6^{10} | 6 | [10]
(Italy) Matteo Covato (United States) Gray Voelzke | 7^{12} | 3 | [6]
3 | (Spain) O Roca Batalla (Spain) A Sánchez Quílez | 3 | 6 | [10]
(Czech Republic) Matthew William Donald (Greece) D Sakellaridis | 6 | 4 | [7]
(Spain) Ignasi Forcano (Netherlands) M Vervoort | 6 | 6
WC | (Italy) Andrea Cardella (Italy) Mattia Rossi | 2 | 2
(South Korea) G Campaña Lee (Spain) Àlex Martí Pujolràs | 4 | 6 | [10]
4 | (Italy) Simone Agostini (Czech Republic) J Forejtek | 6 | 3 | [8]
(Italy) Juan Cruz Martin Manzano (Italy) Federico Valle | 6 | 6^{3} | [6]
(France) G Blancaneaux (France) M Chazal | 4 | 7^{7} | [10]
(Italy) F Agamenone (Argentina) Máximo Zeitune | 1 | 7^{8} | [10]
2 | (Venezuela) Juan José Bianchi (Australia) K Pearson | 6 | 6^{6} | [8]

Quarterfinals
1 | (Italy) F Forti (Italy) F Romano | 6 | 6
PR | (Zimbabwe) B Lock (Zimbabwe) CJ Lock | 4 | 1
3 | (Spain) O Roca Batalla (Spain) A Sánchez Quílez
(Spain) I Forcano (Netherlands) M Vervoort | w/o
WC | (Italy) CA Caniato (Italy) Massimo Giunta | 6^{5} | 2
(South Korea) G Campaña Lee (Spain) À Martí Pujolràs | 7^{7} | 6
(France) G Blancaneaux (France) M Chazal | 6^{5} | 6 | [8]
(Italy) F Agamenone (Argentina) M Zeitune | 7^{7} | 3 | [10]

Semifinals
1 | (Italy) F Forti (Italy) F Romano | w/o
(Spain) I Forcano (Netherlands) M Vervoort
(South Korea) G Campaña Lee (Spain) À Martí Pujolràs | 6^{7} | 6 | [7]
(Italy) F Agamenone (Argentina) M Zeitune | 7^{9} | 3 | [10]

Final
1 | (Italy) F Forti (Italy) F Romano | 4 | 7 | [10]
(Italy) F Agamenone (Argentina) M Zeitune | 6 | 5 | [8]
