= Tennis at the Mediterranean Games =

Tennis has been contested at every Mediterranean Games since its introduction to the program at the 1963 Mediterranean Games. The 1975 Mediterranean Games were the last games with tennis as a male only event — beginning with the 1979 Mediterranean Games, women's tennis is included in the program.

== Medal table ==
=== Men's ===
==== Singles ====
Games	Gold	Silver	Bronze
1963 Naples	(Italy) Nicola Pietrangeli	(Spain) Manuel Santana	(Socialist Federal Republic of Yugoslavia) Boro Jovanović
1963 Naples	(Italy) Nicola Pietrangeli	(Spain) Manuel Santana	(Socialist Federal Republic of Yugoslavia) Nikola Pilić
1967 Tunis	(Spain) Manuel Santana	(Spain) Juan Gisbert	(Spain) José Luis Arilla
1971 İzmir	(Spain) Manuel Orantes	(Spain) Juan Gisbert	(Greece) Nicholas Kalogeropoulos
1975 Algiers	(Spain) Ángel Giménez	(Socialist Federal Republic of Yugoslavia) Dragan Savić	(Algeria) Abdeslam Mahmoudi
1975 Algiers	(Spain) Ángel Giménez	(Socialist Federal Republic of Yugoslavia) Dragan Savić	(Italy) Carlo Borea
1979 Split	(Spain) Fernando Luna	(Socialist Federal Republic of Yugoslavia) Zoltan Ilin	(Spain) Ernesto Vázquez
1983 Casablanca	(Italy) Francesco Cancellotti	(Egypt) Tarek El-Sakka	(Italy) Simone Ercoli
1987 Latakia	(Morocco) Arafat Chekrouni	(Italy) Omar Camporese	(Spain) Fernando García Lleó
1991 Athens	(Italy) Stefano Pescosolido	(Italy) Massimo Cierro	(Italy) Paolo Pambianco
1993 Languedoc-Roussillon	(Morocco) Younes El Aynaoui	(Spain) Jordi Burillo	(Spain) Alberto Berasategui
1997 Bari	(Italy) Vincenzo Santopadre	(Spain) Alberto Martín	(Spain) Fernando Vicente
2001 Tunis	(Greece) Konstantinos Economidis	(Italy) Leonardo Azzaro	(Morocco) Mehdi Tahiri
2005 Almería	(Spain) Nicolás Almagro	(Spain) Guillermo García López	(Italy) Simone Bolelli
2009 Pescara	(Spain) Roberto Bautista Agut	(Turkey) Marsel İlhan	(Italy) Gianluca Naso
2013 Mersin	(Slovenia) Blaž Rola	(Turkey) Marsel İlhan	(Tunisia) Malek Jaziri
2018 Tarragona	(Morocco) Lamine Ouahab	(Monaco) Lucas Catarina	(Italy) Jacopo Berrettini
2022 Oran	(Italy) Francesco Passaro	(Spain) Carlos López Montagud	(Morocco) Adam Moundir
2026 Taranto	(Morocco) Karim Bennani	(Spain) Alejo Sánchez Quílez	(Italy) Carlo Alberto Caniato

==== Doubles ====
Games	Gold	Silver	Bronze
1963 Naples	(Socialist Federal Republic of Yugoslavia) Boro Jovanović and Nikola Pilić	(Egypt) Ismail El Shafei and Fathi Ali	(Spain) José Luis Arilla and Manuel Santana
1963 Naples	(Socialist Federal Republic of Yugoslavia) Boro Jovanović and Nikola Pilić	(Egypt) Ismail El Shafei and Fathi Ali	(Italy) Nicola Pietrangeli and Orlando Sirola
1967 Tunis	(Spain) José Luis Arilla and Manuel Santana	(Spain) Juan Gisbert and Manuel Orantes	(Italy) Vittorio Crotta and Giordano Maioli
1971 İzmir	(Spain) Juan Gisbert and Manuel Orantes	(Spain) José Guerrero and Antonio Muñoz	(Italy) Adriano Panatta and Antonio Zugarelli
1975 Algiers	(Italy) Carlo Borea and Enzo Vattuone	(Spain) Ángel Giménez and Miguel Mir	(Algeria) Sebti Bounaib and Abdeslam Mahmoudi
1975 Algiers	(Italy) Carlo Borea and Enzo Vattuone	(Spain) Ángel Giménez and Miguel Mir	(Socialist Federal Republic of Yugoslavia) Zoltan Ilin and Dragan Savić
1979 Split	(Italy) Marco Alciati and Patrizio Parrini	(Socialist Federal Republic of Yugoslavia) Zoltan Ilin and Zoran Petković	(Spain) Fernando Luna and Alberto Martorell Lossius
1983 Casablanca	(Spain) Martín Jaite and Javier Soler	(Egypt) Ahmed El-Mehelmy and Tarek El-Sakka	(Italy) Luca Bottazzi and Simone Colombo
1987 Latakia	(Italy) Omar Camporese and Eugenio Rossi	(Morocco) Arafat Chekrouni and Abdel Nadini	(Spain) Fernando García Lleó and Luis Riba
1991 Athens	(Italy) Massimo Boscatto and Stefano Pescosolido	(Spain) Alberto Berasategui and Àlex Corretja	(Morocco) Younes El Aynaoui and Mohammed Ridaoui
1993 Languedoc-Rousillon	(Italy) Massimo Bertolini and Mosé Navarra	(Spain) Alberto Berasategui and Jordi Burillo	(Morocco) Younes El Aynaoui and Mohammed Ridaoui
1997 Bari	(Italy) Gabrio Castrichella and Vincenzo Santopadre	(Slovenia) Iztok Božič and Borut Urh	(Spain) Alberto Martín and Fernando Vicente
2001 Tunis	(Greece) Konstantinos Economidis and Anastasios Vasiliadis	(Algeria) Abdelhak Hameurlaïne and Noureddine Mahmoudi	(Morocco) Mounir El Aarej and Mehdi Tahiri
2005 Almería	(Spain) Nicolás Almagro and Guillermo García López	(Algeria) Lamine Ouahab and Slimane Saoudi	(Slovenia) Boštjan Ošabnik and Grega Žemlja
2009 Pescara	(Italy) Matteo Marrai and Gianluca Naso	(Montenegro) Daniel Danilović and Goran Tošić	(Spain) Roberto Bautista Agut and Gerard Granollers
2013 Mersin	(Slovenia) Blaž Rola and Tomislav Ternar	(Tunisia) Haythem Abid and Malek Jaziri	(Spain) Albert Alcaraz Ivorra and David Pérez Sanz
2018 Tarragona	(France) Corentin Denolly and Alexandre Müller	(Tunisia) Aziz Dougaz and Anis Ghorbel	(Turkey) Sarp Ağabigün and Anıl Yüksel
2022 Oran	(Italy) Matteo Arnaldi and Francesco Passaro	(Spain) Carlos López Montagud and Álvaro López San Martín	(Morocco) Elliot Benchetrit and Adam Moundir
2026 Taranto	(Morocco) Yassine Dlimi and Younes Lalami	(Spain) Àlex Martí Pujolràs and Alejo Sánchez Quílez	(Cyprus) Melios Efstathiou and Eleftherios Neos

=== Women's ===
==== Singles ====
Games	Gold	Silver	Bronze
1979 Split	(Socialist Federal Republic of Yugoslavia) Mima Jaušovec	(Italy) Daniela Porzio	(Spain) Mónica Álvarez de Mon
1983 Casablanca	(Socialist Federal Republic of Yugoslavia) Renata Šašak	(Italy) Laura Golarsa	(Greece) Olga Tsarbopoulou
1987 Latakia	(Spain) Conchita Martínez	(Greece) Angeliki Kanellopoulou	(Italy) Francesca Romano
1991 Athens	(Italy) Katia Piccolini	(Spain) Pilar Pérez	(Italy) Nathalie Baudone
1993 Languedoc-Rousillon	(Croatia) Maja Murić	(Spain) Virginia Ruano Pascual	(France) Lea Ghirardi
1997 Bari	(Italy) Tathiana Garbin	(Italy) Maria Paola Zavagli	(Spain) Ana Alcázar
2001 Tunis	(Morocco) Bahia Mouhtassine	(Greece) Eleni Daniilidou	(Spain) Lourdes Domínguez Lino
2005 Almería	(Spain) Laura Pous Tió	(Spain) Nuria Llagostera Vives	(Croatia) Matea Mezak
2009 Pescara	(Italy) Evelyn Mayr	(Spain) Laura Pous Tió	(Spain) Eva Fernández Brugués
2013 Mersin	(Turkey) Çağla Büyükakçay	(Spain) Sara Sorribes Tormo	(Italy) Federica Di Sarra
2018 Tarragona	(Turkey) Başak Eraydın	(France) Fiona Ferro	(Slovenia) Veronika Erjavec
2022 Oran	(Spain) Guiomar Maristany	(Italy) Nuria Brancaccio	(Spain) Jéssica Bouzas Maneiro
2026 Taranto	(Italy) Noemi Basiletti	(Greece) Martha Matoula	(Morocco) Yasmine Kabbaj

==== Doubles ====
Games	Gold	Silver	Bronze
1979 Split	(Socialist Federal Republic of Yugoslavia) Mima Jaušovec and Renata Šašak	(Spain) Mónica Álvarez de Mon and Beatriz Pellón	(Italy) Patrizia Murgo and Antonella Rosa
1983 Casablanca	(Spain) Ana Almansa and Margarita Vaquero	(Italy) Laura Golarsa and Jessica Zanelli	(Italy) Laura Garrone and Nicoletta Virgintino
1987 Latakia	(Greece) Angeliki Kanellopoulou and Olga Tsarbopoulou	(Italy) Giovanna Carotenuto and Francesca Romano	(France) Virginie Buisson and Sabine Santoro
1991 Athens	(Italy) Nathalie Baudone and Katia Piccolini	(Italy) Francesca Romano and Elena Savoldi	(Spain) Neus Ávila and Pilar Pérez
1993 Languedoc-Rousillon	(Croatia) Maja Murić and Silvija Talaja	(France) Lea Ghirardi and Carole Lucarelli	(Spain) Eva Jiménez and Virginia Ruano Pascual
1997 Bari	(Greece) Christína Papadáki and Christina Zachariadou	(Italy) Tathiana Garbin and Maria Paola Zavagli	(Turkey) Duygu Akşit Oal and Gülberk Gültekin
2001 Tunis	(Greece) Eleni Daniilidou and Maria Pavlidou	(Spain) Lourdes Domínguez Lino and María José Martínez Sánchez	(Italy) Valentina Sassi and Nathalie Viérin
2005 Almería	(Spain) Nuria Llagostera Vives and Laura Pous Tió	(Croatia) Matea Mezak and Ana Vrljić	(Italy) Stefania Chieppa and Verdiana Verardi
2009 Pescara	(Spain) Eva Fernández Brugués and Laura Pous Tió	(Turkey) Çağla Büyükakçay and Pemra Özgen	(Morocco) Fatima El Allami and Nadia Lalami
2013 Mersin	(Turkey) Çağla Büyükakçay and Pemra Özgen	(Italy) Anastasia Grymalska and Federica Di Sarra	(Tunisia) Nour Abbès and Ons Jabeur
2018 Tarragona	(Turkey) Başak Eraydın and İpek Öz	(Bosnia and Herzegovina) Nefisa Berberović and Dea Herdželaš	(Spain) Marina Bassols Ribera and Eva Guerrero Álvarez
2022 Oran	(Spain) Jéssica Bouzas Maneiro and Guiomar Maristany	(Malta) Francesca Curmi and Elaine Genovese	(Italy) Nuria Brancaccio and Aurora Zantedeschi
2026 Taranto	(Greece) Elena Korokozidi and Martha Matoula	(Italy) Noemi Basiletti and Vittoria Paganetti	(Turkey) Çağla Büyükakçay and Berfu Cengiz

=== Mixed ===
==== Doubles ====
Games	Gold	Silver	Bronze
2026 Taranto	(Italy) Vittoria Paganetti and Filippo Romano	(Spain) Lucía Cortez Llorca and Alejo Sánchez Quílez	(Morocco) Diae El Jardi and Younes Lalami

== Medal tables ==
=== All years ===
Updated after the 2026 Mediterranean Games

Rank	Nation	Gold	Silver	Bronze	Total
1	Italy (ITA)	19	13	19	51
2	Spain (ESP)	17	23	19	59
3	Greece (GRE)	6	3	2	11
4	Morocco (MAR)	6	1	9	16
5	Turkey (TUR)	4	3	3	10
5	Yugoslavia (YUG)	4	3	3	10
7	Slovenia (SLO)	2	1	2	5
8	Croatia (CRO)	2	1	1	4
9	France (FRA)	1	2	2	5
10	Egypt (EGY)	0	3	0	3
11	Algeria (ALG)	0	2	2	4
11	Tunisia (TUN)	0	2	2	4
13	Bosnia and Herzegovina (BIH)	0	1	0	1
13	Malta (MLT)	0	1	0	1
13	Monaco (MON)	0	1	0	1
13	Montenegro (MNE)	0	1	0	1
17	Cyprus (CYP)	0	0	1	1
Totals (17 entries)		61	61	65	187

=== Players with 3 or more medals ===
Rank	Name	Gold	Silver	Bronze	Total
1	(Spain) Laura Pous Tió	3	1	0	4
2	(Turkey) Çağla Büyükakçay	2	1	1	4
2	(Spain) Manuel Santana	2	1	1	4
4	(Spain) Manuel Orantes	2	1	0	3
5	(Spain) Juan Gisbert	1	3	0	4
6	(Spain) José Luis Arilla	1	0	2	3
6	(Morocco) Younes El Aynaoui	1	0	2	3
8	(Spain) Alejo Sánchez Quílez	0	3	0	3
9	(Italy) Francesca Romano	0	2	1	3
10	(Spain) Alberto Berasategui	0	1	2	3
10	(Socialist Federal Republic of Yugoslavia) Zoltan Ilin	0	1	2	3
