= Tennis at the 2026 Mediterranean Games – Mixed doubles =

Tennis tournament at 2026 Mediterranean Games

Mixed doubles
- Tennis at the 2026 Mediterranean Games

Events
Singles	men	women
Doubles	men	women	mixed
- Mediterranean Games

The mixed doubles at the 2026 Mediterranean Games was held from 25 to 30 August 2026 at the Magna Grecia Tennis Center. It was the first time for this event in the Mediterranean Games.

Vittoria Paganetti and Filippo Romano of Italy won the gold medal, defeating Lucía Cortez Llorca and Alejo Sánchez Quílez of Spain, 6–4, 6–2.

Diae El Jardi and Younes Lalami of Morocco won the bronze medal, defeating Madalena Matias and Francisco Rocha of Portugal, 6–7^{(4–7)}, 7–5, [10–7].

== Medalists ==
Gold	Silver	Bronze
Vittoria Paganetti and Filippo Romano; Italy	Lucía Cortez Llorca and Alejo Sánchez Quílez; Spain	Diae El Jardi and Younes Lalami; Morocco

== Seeds ==
All two seeds received a bye into the quartefinals.

1. (Italy) Vittoria Paganetti / (Italy) Filippo Romano (champion; gold medalists)
2. (Morocco) Diae El Jardi / (Morocco) Younes Lalami (semifinals; bronze medalists)

== Draw ==
First round 25/26 August
R Serban (CYP); E Neos (CYP)	6	6
S Mitevska (MKD); K Janev (MKD)	4	2
L Muharremi (KOS); F Limani (KOS)	5	1
E Genovese (MLT); A De Gabriele (MLT)	7	6
M Matoula (GRE); I Xilas (GRE)	7	3	[10]
T Nikčević (MNE); P Jovanović (MNE)	5	6	[2]

Quarterfinals; 26/27 August
1	V Paganetti (ITA); F Romano (ITA)	6	7^{7}
R Serban (CYP); E Neos (CYP)	2	6^{3}
İ Kurt (TUR); A Azkara (TUR)	4	6	[5]
M Matias (POR); F Rocha (POR)	6	4	[10]
E Genovese (MLT); A De Gabriele (MLT)	1	0
L Llorca (ESP); A Sánchez (ESP)	6	6
M Matoula (GRE); I Xilas (GRE)	1	6^{11}
2	D El Jardi (MAR); Y Lalami (MAR)	6	7^{13}

Semifinals; 28 August
1	V Paganetti (ITA); F Romano (ITA)	6	6
M Matias (POR); F Rocha (POR)	3	1
L Llorca (ESP); A Sánchez (ESP)	6	5	[10]
2	D El Jardi (MAR); Y Lalami (MAR)	3	7	[8]

Finals; 30 August
1	V Paganetti (ITA); F Romano (ITA)	6	6
L Llorca (ESP); A Sánchez (ESP)	4	2
Bronze medal match 30 June
M Matias (POR); F Rocha (POR)	7^{7}	5	[7]
2	D El Jardi (MAR); Y Lalami (MAR)	6^{4}	7	[10]
