= 2026 Città di Biella =

- Date: 14 – 20 September
- Edition: 18th
- Surface: Clay
- Location: Biella, Italy

Champions

Singles
- (Italy) Carlo Alberto Caniato

Doubles
- (Italy) Francesco Forti / (Italy) Filippo Romano
- Città di Biella

The 2026 Città di Biella was a professional tennis tournament played on outdoor red clay courts. It was part of the 2026 ATP Challenger Tour. It took in Biella, Italy between 14 and 20 September 2026.

== Singles main-draw entrants ==
=== Seeds ===
Country	Player	Rank^{1}	Seed
ITA	Gianluca Cadenasso	194	1
GBR	Felix Gill	214	2
ITA	Stefano Napolitano	229	3
ARG	Alex Barrena	235	4
ESP	Alejandro Moro Cañas	238	5
GBR	Jay Clarke	242	6
~~BRA~~	~~João Lucas Reis da Silva~~	~~282~~	~~7~~
ITA	Franco Agamenone	291	8

- Rankings are as of 31 August 2026.

=== Other entrants ===
The following players received wildcards into the singles main draw:

- (Italy) Carlo Alberto Caniato
- (Italy) Riccardo Carpano
- (Italy) Massimo Giunta

The following players received entry from the qualifying draw:

- (Spain) Izan Almazán Valiente
- (Italy) Pierluigi Basile
- (South Korea) Gerard Campaña Lee
- (Italy) Giuseppe La Vela
- Pavel Lagutin
- (Spain) Àlex Martí Pujolràs

The following player received entry as a lucky loser:

- (Italy) Juan Cruz Martin Manzano

== Champions ==
=== Singles ===
- (Italy) Carlo Alberto Caniato def. (Spain) Alejandro Moro Cañas 7–6^{(7–1)}, 6–4.

=== Doubles ===
- (Italy) Francesco Forti / (Italy) Filippo Romano def. (Italy) Franco Agamenone / (Argentina) Máximo Zeitune 4–6, 7–5, [10–8].
