= 2026 Italian Open – Women's doubles =

Women's doubles
- 2026 Italian Open

Final
- Champions: Mirra Andreeva; Diana Shnaider
- Runners-up: (Spain) Cristina Bucșa (United States) Nicole Melichar-Martinez
- Score: 6–3, 6–3

Details
- Draw: 32
- Seeds: 8

Events
| Singles | men | women |
| Doubles | men | women |
- Italian Open

Mirra Andreeva and Diana Shnaider defeated Cristina Bucșa and Nicole Melichar-Martinez in the final, 6–3, 6–3 to win the women's doubles tennis title at the 2026 Italian Open.

Sara Errani and Jasmine Paolini were the two-time defending champions, but withdrew before their second-round match due to a left-ankle injury sustained by Paolini.

== Seeds ==
1. (Italy) Sara Errani / (Italy) Jasmine Paolini (second round, withdrew)
2. (Czech Republic) Kateřina Siniaková / (United States) Taylor Townsend (semifinals)
3. (Belgium) Elise Mertens / (China) Zhang Shuai (first round)
4. (Canada) Gabriela Dabrowski / (Brazil) Luisa Stefani (first round)
5. (Latvia) Jeļena Ostapenko / (New Zealand) Erin Routliffe (first round)
6. (Kazakhstan) Anna Danilina / (United States) Asia Muhammad (quarterfinals)
7. (Spain) Cristina Bucșa / (United States) Nicole Melichar-Martinez (final)
8. (Australia) Ellen Perez / (Netherlands) Demi Schuurs (quarterfinals)

== Draw ==
Key

- Q = Qualifier
- WC = Wild card
- LL = Lucky loser
- Alt = Alternate
- ITF = ITF entry
- PR = Protected ranking
- SR = Special ranking
- SE = Special exempt
- JE = Junior exempt
- JR = Junior Accelerator Programme entrant
- CO = College Accelerator Programme entrant
- NG = Next Gen Accelerator Program entrant
- w/o = Walkover
- r = Retired
- d = Defaulted

=== Finals ===
Semifinals
(Australia) Storm Hunter (United States) Jessica Pegula | 1 | 2
Mirra Andreeva; Diana Shnaider | 6 | 6
7 | (Spain) Cristina Bucșa (United States) Nicole Melichar-Martinez | 6 | 6
2 | (Czech Republic) Kateřina Siniaková (United States) Taylor Townsend | 4 | 4

Final
Mirra Andreeva; Diana Shnaider | 6 | 6
7 | (Spain) Cristina Bucșa (United States) Nicole Melichar-Martinez | 3 | 3

=== Top half ===
First round
1 | (Italy) S Errani (Italy) J Paolini | 6 | 6
WC | (Italy) G Maduzzi (Italy) V Paganetti | 4 | 3
(Czech Republic) L Nosková (Czech Republic) T Valentová | 6 | 6
(Chinese Taipei) H-c Chan (Hungary) F Stollár | 1 | 1
PR | (Japan) M Kato (Slovenia) A Klepač | 5 | 6^{4}
(Germany) L Siegemund; V Zvonareva | 7 | 7^{7}
(Australia) S Hunter (United States) J Pegula | 6 | 7^{7}
5 | (Latvia) J Ostapenko (New Zealand) E Routliffe | 4 | 6^{2}
3 | (Belgium) E Mertens (China) S Zhang | 7^{7} | 5 | [6]
(Chinese Taipei) S-w Hsieh (China) Xin Wang | 6^{2} | 7 | [10]
M Andreeva; D Shnaider | 6 | 6^{4} | [10]
(Ukraine) L Kichenok (United States) D Krawczyk | 3 | 7^{7} | [6]
I Khromacheva (Mexico) G Olmos | 6 | 0 | [10]
(United States) S Kenin; L Samsonova | 2 | 6 | [4]
(China) X Jiang (China) Y Xu | 4 | 6 | [11]
6 | (Kazakhstan) A Danilina (United States) A Muhammad | 6 | 1 | [13]

Second round
1 | (Italy) S Errani (Italy) J Paolini
(Czech Republic) L Nosková (Czech Republic) T Valentová | w/o
(Germany) L Siegemund; V Zvonareva | 5 | 4
(Australia) S Hunter (United States) J Pegula | 7 | 6
(Chinese Taipei) S-w Hsieh (China) Xin Wang | 5 | 2
M Andreeva; D Shnaider | 7 | 6
I Khromacheva (Mexico) G Olmos | 6 | 5 | [7]
6 | (Kazakhstan) A Danilina (United States) A Muhammad | 3 | 7 | [10]

Quarterfinals
(Czech Republic) L Nosková (Czech Republic) T Valentová | 4 | 6 | [7]
(Australia) S Hunter (United States) J Pegula | 6 | 2 | [10]
M Andreeva; D Shnaider | 4 | 6 | [11]
6 | (Kazakhstan) A Danilina (United States) A Muhammad | 6 | 3 | [9]

Semifinals
(Australia) S Hunter (United States) J Pegula | 1 | 2
M Andreeva; D Shnaider | 6 | 6

=== Bottom half ===
First round
7 | (Spain) C Bucșa (United States) N Melichar-Martinez | 6 | 6
(Czech Republic) J Malečková (Czech Republic) M Škoch | 2 | 2
(Norway) U Eikeri (United States) Q Gleason | 4 | 4
(Ukraine) N Kichenok (Serbia) A Krunić | 6 | 6
(United States) C Gauff (United States) C McNally | 5 | 7 | [13]
(Indonesia) A Sutjiadi (Indonesia) J Tjen | 7 | 5 | [11]
(Czech Republic) M Bouzková; A Panova | 6 | 6^{4} | [10]
4 | (Canada) G Dabrowski (Brazil) L Stefani | 2 | 7^{7} | [3]
8 | (Australia) E Perez (Netherlands) D Schuurs | 6 | 6
(Slovakia) T Mihalíková (United Kingdom) O Nicholls | 4 | 4
(United States) I Jovic; A Kalinskaya | 5 | 6 | [10]
(Japan) E Hozumi (Chinese Taipei) F-h Wu | 7 | 3 | [6]
WC | (Italy) TC Grant (Italy) J Ruggeri | 4 | 4
(Romania) S Cîrstea (Romania) J Cristian | 6 | 6
Alt | (United States) H Baptiste (Philippines) A Eala | 2 | 1
2 | (Czech Republic) K Siniaková (United States) T Townsend | 6 | 6

Second round
7 | (Spain) C Bucșa (United States) N Melichar-Martinez | 7^{7} | 7
(Ukraine) N Kichenok (Serbia) A Krunić | 6^{4} | 5
(United States) C Gauff (United States) C McNally | 6 | 7
(Czech Republic) M Bouzková; A Panova | 3 | 5
8 | (Australia) E Perez (Netherlands) D Schuurs | w/o
(United States) I Jovic; A Kalinskaya
(Romania) S Cîrstea (Romania) J Cristian
2 | (Czech Republic) K Siniaková (United States) T Townsend | w/o

Quarterfinals
7 | (Spain) C Bucșa (United States) N Melichar-Martinez | w/o
(United States) C Gauff (United States) C McNally
8 | (Australia) E Perez (Netherlands) D Schuurs | 5 | 0
2 | (Czech Republic) K Siniaková (United States) T Townsend | 7 | 6

Semifinals
7 | (Spain) C Bucșa (United States) N Melichar-Martinez | 6 | 6
2 | (Czech Republic) K Siniaková (United States) T Townsend | 4 | 4

== Seeded teams ==
The following are the seeded teams. Seedings are based on WTA rankings as of 20 April 2026.

| Country | Player | Country | Player | Rank | Seed |
|---|---|---|---|---|---|
| ITA | Sara Errani | ITA | Jasmine Paolini | 6 | 1 |
| CZE | Kateřina Siniaková | USA | Taylor Townsend | 7 | 2 |
| BEL | Elise Mertens | CHN | Zhang Shuai | 12 | 3 |
| CAN | Gabriela Dabrowski | BRA | Luisa Stefani | 16 | 4 |
| LAT | Jeļena Ostapenko | NZL | Erin Routliffe | 26 | 5 |
| KAZ | Anna Danilina | USA | Asia Muhammad | 30 | 6 |
| ESP | Cristina Bucșa | USA | Nicole Melichar-Martinez | 35 | 7 |
| AUS | Ellen Perez | NED | Demi Schuurs | 42 | 8 |

== Other entry information ==
=== Wildcards ===
- (Italy) Tyra Caterina Grant / (Italy) Jennifer Ruggeri
- (Italy) Gaia Maduzzi / (Italy) Vittoria Paganetti

=== Protected ranking ===
- (Japan) Miyu Kato / (Slovenia) Andreja Klepač

=== Alternates ===
- (United States) Hailey Baptiste / (Philippines) Alexandra Eala

=== Withdrawal ===
- (Italy) Elisabetta Cocciaretto / (Canada) Leylah Fernandez → replaced by (United States) Hailey Baptiste / (Philippines) Alexandra Eala
