= Alejandro Moro Cañas =

Spanish tennis player (born 2000)

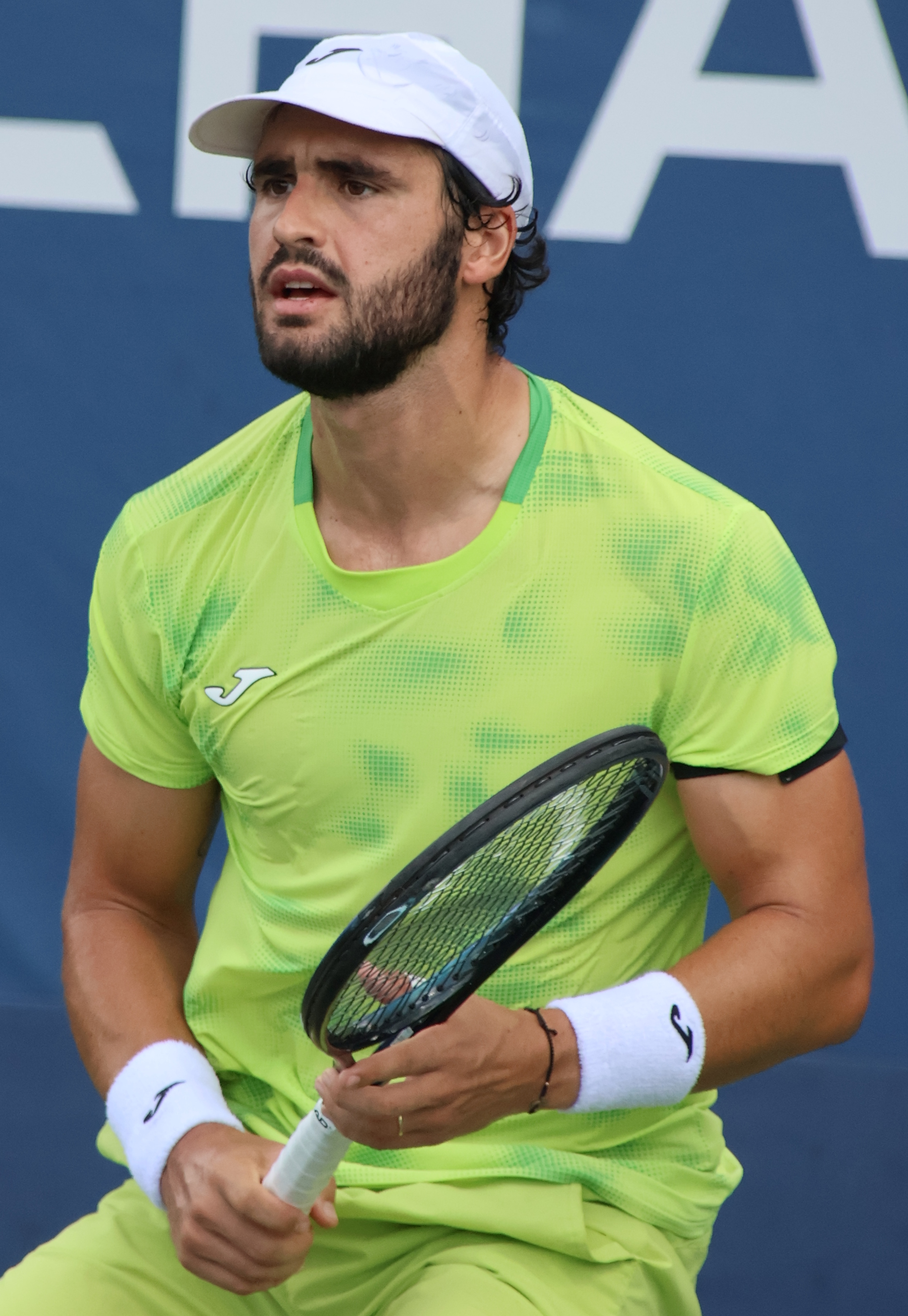
- Moro Cañas at the 2026 US Open
- Country (sports): Spain
- Born: 7 December 2000 (age 25) Madrid, Spain
- Height: 1.83 m (6 ft 0 in)
- Plays: Right-handed (two-handed backhand)
- Coach: David Flores
- Prize money: US $751,157

Singles
- Career record: 1–3 (at ATP Tour level, Grand Slam level, and in Davis Cup)
- Career titles: 0
- Highest ranking: No. 142 (26 August 2024)
- Current ranking: No. 232 (19 October 2026)

Grand Slam singles results
- Australian Open: Q2 (2025)
- French Open: Q3 (2024)
- Wimbledon: 1R (2024)
- US Open: Q1 (2024, 2026)

Doubles
- Career record: 0–0 (at ATP Tour level, Grand Slam level, and in Davis Cup)
- Career titles: 0
- Highest ranking: No. 419 (17 July 2023)
- Current ranking: No. 1,343 (19 October 2026)
- Last updated on: 19 October 2026.

Alejandro Moro Cañas (born 7 December 2000) is a Spanish tennis player. He has a career-high ATP singles ranking of world No. 142 achieved on 26 August 2024 and a doubles ranking of No. 419 achieved on 17 July 2023.

== Career ==
=== 2021-2023: First ITF title ===
In July 2021, Moro Cañas won his first professional title at an ITF M25 tournament in Portugal. He reached his second final in another tournament in Portugal two months later, losing to Paul Jubb in straight sets.

In 2022, he started the season as a runner-up in two tournaments in February, losing in the finals in ITF tournaments in Spain and Portugal.

He received a wildcard into qualifying at the Madrid Masters 1000 tournament, where he defeated world No. 47 Francisco Cerúndolo before losing in the final round of qualifiers to Lorenzo Musetti. He won his first clay court title in Vic, Spain before losing in a hardcourt final in Bakio. He reached his fifth final of the 2022 season in Antalya, Turkey, defeating Timo Stodder.

In 2023, he only reached one final, a doubles ITF final in Spain, losing with partner John Echeverría to fellow Spaniards Íñigo Cervantes and Oriol Roca Batalla.

=== 2024: ATP, Major debuts and first win, maiden Challenger title, top 150 ===
Ranked No. 240, he qualified for the 2024 BMW Open making his ATP debut and stunned Dominic Thiem for his first ATP win. Three weeks later, he made his top 200 debut at world No. 172 on 6 May 2024.

Ranked No. 189, he made his Grand Slam debut at the 2024 Wimbledon Championships after qualifying with a win in the last qualifying round over tenth qualifying seed Damir Džumhur after his retirement.

Following a Challenger final showing at the 2024 Porto Open, he reached the top 150 at world No. 146 on 12 August 2024.

== Performance timeline ==
Key
W	F	SF	QF	#R	RR	Q#	DNQ	A	NH

(W) winner; (F) finalist; (SF) semifinalist; (QF) quarterfinalist; (#R) rounds 4, 3, 2, 1; (RR) round-robin stage; (Q#) qualification round; (DNQ) did not qualify; (A) absent; (NH) not held; (SR) strike rate (events won / competed); (W–L) win–loss record.

=== Singles ===
Tournament	2022	2023	2024	2025	SR	W–L	Win%
Grand Slam tournaments
Australian Open	A	A	A	Q2	0 / 0	0–0	–
French Open	A	A	Q3	Q1	0 / 0	0–0	–
Wimbledon	A	A	1R	Q1	0 / 1	0–1	0%
US Open	A	A	Q1	A	0 / 0	0–0	–
Win–loss	0–0	0–0	0–1	0–0	0 / 1	0–1	0%
ATP Masters 1000
Indian Wells Masters	A	A	A	A	0 / 0	0–0	–
Miami Open	A	A	A	Q1	0 / 0	0–0	–
Monte Carlo Masters	A	A	A	A	0 / 0	0–0	–
Madrid Open	Q2	A	A	A	0 / 0	0-0	–
Italian Open	A	A	A	A	0 / 0	0–0	–
Canadian Open	A	A	A	A	0 / 0	0–0	–
Cincinnati Masters	A	A	A	A	0 / 0	0–0	–
Shanghai Masters	NH	A	Q2	A	0 / 0	0–0	–
Paris Masters	A	A	A		0 / 0	0–0	–
Win–loss	0–0	0–0	0–0	0–0	0 / 0	0–0	–

== ATP Challenger Tour finals ==
=== Singles: 5 (1 title, 4 runner-ups) ===
Legend ATP Challenger Tour (1–4)

Result	W–L	Date	Tournament	Tier	Surface	Opponent	Score
Win	1–0	Apr 2024	Garden Open, Italy	Challenger	Clay	(Lithuania) Vilius Gaubas	7–5, 6–3
Loss	1–1	Aug 2024	Porto Open, Portugal	Challenger	Hard	(Denmark) August Holmgren	6–7^{(3–7)}, 6–7^{(6–8)}
Loss	1–2	Feb 2025	Tenerife Challenger, Spain	Challenger	Hard	(Spain) Pablo Carreño Busta	3–6, 2–6
Loss	1–3	Feb 2026	Tenerife Challenger II, Spain	Challenger	Hard	(South Africa) Lloyd Harris	5–7, 5–7
Loss	1–4	Sep 2026	Città di Biella, Italy	Challenger	Clay	(Italy) Carlo Alberto Caniato	6–7^{(1–6)}, 4–6

== ITF World Tennis Tour finals ==
=== Singles: 8 (3 titles, 5 runner-ups) ===
Legend ITF WTT (3–5)	Finals by surface Hard (1–4) Clay (2–1)

Result	W–L	Date	Tournament	Tier	Surface	Opponent	Score
Win	1–0	Jul 2021	M25 Idanha-a-Nova, Portugal	WTT	Hard	(Republic of Ireland) Simon Carr	7–6^{(7–5)}, 6–4
Loss	1–1	Sep 2021	M25 Sintra, Portugal	WTT	Hard	(United Kingdom) Paul Jubb	0–6, 2–6
Loss	1–2	Feb 2022	M15 Villena, Spain	WTT	Hard	(Spain) Nikolás Sánchez Izquierdo	6–7^{(3–7)}, 3–6
Loss	1–3	Feb 2022	M25 Vale do Lobo, Portugal	WTT	Hard	(France) Laurent Lokoli	2–6, 1–6
Win	2–3	May 2022	M25 Vic, Spain	WTT	Clay	(Spain) Pol Martín Tiffon	7–6^{(7–4)}, 5–7, 6–1
Loss	2–4	Jul 2022	M25 Bakio, Spain	WTT	Hard	(Czech Republic) Dominik Palán	7–6^{(7–4)}, 4–6, 6–7^{(4–7)}
Win	3–4	Nov 2022	M25 Antalya, Turkey	WTT	Clay	(Germany) Timo Stodder	7–5, 3–6, 7–6^{(7–4)}
Loss	3–5	Oct 2026	M25 Zaragoza, Spain	WTT	Clay	(Switzerland) Alexander Ritschard	3–6, 2–6

=== Doubles: 1 (runner-up) ===
Legend ITF WTT (0–1)

Result	W–L	Date	Tournament	Tier	Surface	Partner	Opponents	Score
Loss	0–1	Mar 2023	M25 Torelló, Spain	WTT	Hard	(Spain) John Echeverría	(Spain) Íñigo Cervantes (Spain) Oriol Roca Batalla	5–7, 4–6
