= Lucía Cortez Llorca =

Spanish tennis player (born 2000)

Lucía Cortez
- Full name: Lucía Cortez Llorca
- Country (sports): Spain
- Born: 5 June 2000 (age 26) Villajoyosa, Alicante, Spain
- Turned pro: 2015
- Plays: Right (two-handed backhand)
- Prize money: $124,707

Singles
- Career record: 271–251
- Career titles: 1 ITF
- Highest ranking: No. 309 (19 August 2024)
- Current ranking: No. 504 (29 June 2026)

Doubles
- Career record: 87–96
- Career titles: 5 ITF
- Highest ranking: No. 353 (29 June 2026)
- Current ranking: No. 353 (29 June 2026)
- Last updated on: 8 July 2026.

Lucía Cortez Llorca
Medal record

Women's tennis

Representing Spain

Mediterranean Games
Silver medal – second place	2026 Taranto	Mixed doubles

Lucía Cortez Llorca (born 5 June 2000) is a Spanish professional tennis player. She has career-high rankings of world No. 309 in singles, achieved on 19 August 2024, and No. 353 in doubles, achieved on 29 June 2026.

== Early life ==
Lucía Cortez Llorca grew up in Villajoyosa. She began playing tennis at the age of four and currently trains at Villajoyosa Club de Tenis.

== Career ==
In August 2024, she won her first professional singles title at the $50k Śląskie Open in Bytom.

== ITF Circuit finals ==
=== Singles: 6 (3 titles, 3 runner-ups) ===
Legend W50 tournaments (1–0) W35 tournaments (2–2) W15 tournaments (0–1)	Finals by surface Hard (0–1) Clay (3–2)

Result	W–L	Date	Tournament	Tier	Surface	Opponent	Score
Loss	0–1	Sep 2018	ITF Ceuta, Spain	W15	Hard	(Bulgaria) Aleksandrina Naydenova	1–6, 6–4, 1–6
Loss	0–2	Jul 2024	ITF Getxo, Spain	W35	Clay (i)	(Argentina) Solana Sierra	2–6, 1–6
Win	1–2	Aug 2024	ITF Bytom, Poland	W50	Clay	(Serbia) Mia Ristić	0–6, 6–4, 7–5
Loss	1–3	Oct 2025	ITF Seville, Spain	W35	Clay	(Spain) Ane Mintegi del Olmo	2–6, 1–6
Win	2–3	Jul 2026	ITF Gentofte, Denmark	W35	Clay	(Sweden) Linea Bajraliu	6–1, 3–6, 6–1
Win	3–3	Sep 2026	ITF Reus, Spain	W35	Clay	(Spain) Ariana Geerlings	6–7^{(5)}, 6–4, 6–1

=== Doubles: 16 (6 titles, 10 runner-ups) ===
Legend W60 tournaments (0–1) W50 tournaments (1–0) W25/35 tournaments (3–7) W15 tournaments (2–2)	Finals by surface Hard (3–1) Clay (2–7) Carpet (1–2)

Result	W–L	Date	Tournament	Tier	Surface	Partner	Opponent	Score
Win	1–0	Jul 2021	ITF Don Benito, Spain	W15	Carpet	(Spain) Olga Parres Azcoitia	(Austria) Tamara Kostic (United States) Erica Oosterhout	6–4, 6–3
Win	2–0	Feb 2022	ITF Villena, Spain	W15	Hard	(Germany) Joëlle Steur	(Germany) Katharina Hering (Spain) Olga Parres Azcoitia	6–2, 6–4
Loss	2–1	Aug 2022	ITF Gran Canaria, Spain	W60	Clay	(Spain) Rosa Vicens Mas	(Spain) Jéssica Bouzas Maneiro (Spain) Leyre Romero Gormaz	6–1, 5–7, [6–10]
Loss	2–2	Aug 2022	ITF Ourense, Spain	W25	Hard	(Spain) Yvonne Cavallé Reimers	(United States) Maria Mateas (Netherlands) Arantxa Rus	4–6, 7–5, [7–10]
Loss	2–3	Dec 2022	ITF Valencia, Spain	W15	Clay	(Spain) Claudia Hoste Ferrer	(Latvia) Darja Semeņistaja (France) Marine Szostak	w/o
Loss	2–4	Jul 2023	ITF Don Benito, Spain	W25	Carpet	(Spain) Olga Parres Azcoitia	(Colombia) María Herazo González (Peru) Anastasia Iamachkine	6–7^{(8)}, 3–6
Win	3–4	Aug 2023	ITF Ourense, Spain	W25	Hard	(Spain) Guiomar Maristany	(Romania) Karola Bejenaru (France) Yasmine Mansouri	6–4, 3–6, [10–6]
Loss	3–5	Mar 2025	ITF Solarino, Italy	W35	Carpet	(Spain) Celia Cerviño Ruiz	(Japan) Hiromi Abe (Japan) Hikaru Sato	2–6, 3–6
Win	4–5	Jun 2025	ITF Périgueux, France	W35	Clay	(Spain) Alicia Herrero Liñana	(Canada) Françoise Abanda (France) Marie Mattel	6–1, 6–4
Win	5–5	Oct 2025	ITF Cherbourg-en-Cotentin, France	W50	Hard (i)	(France) Lucie Nguyen Tan	(France) Manon Léonard (France) Amandine Monnot	6–4, 6–2
Loss	5–6	Dec 2025	ITF Melilla, Spain	W15	Clay	(Spain) Olga Parres Azcoitia	(Germany) Laura Boehner (Netherlands) Demi Tran	walkover
Loss	5–7	Mar 2026	ITF Sabadell, Spain	W35	Clay	(Spain) Alicia Herrero Liñana	(Spain) Aliona Bolsova (Spain) Ángela Fita Boluda	4–6, 1–6
Loss	5–8	Jun 2026	ITF Ystad, Sweden	W35	Clay	(Switzerland) Katerina Tsygourova	(Netherlands) Isis Louise van den Broek (Netherlands) Sarah van Emst	7–5, 6–7^{(3)}, [8–10]
Win	6–8	Sep 2026	ITF Reus, Spain	W35	Clay	(Germany) Joëlle Steur	(Sweden) Caijsa Hennemann (Latvia) Beatrise Zeltiņa	6–4, 6–1
Loss	6–9	Oct 2026	ITF Santa Margherita di Pula, Italy	W35	Clay	(Greece) Marianna Argyrokastriti	(France) Lucie Nguyen Tan (Ukraine) Daria Yesypchuk	3–6, 3–6
Loss	6–10	Nov 2026	ITF Heraklion, Greece	W35	Clay	(Greece) Marianna Argyrokastriti	(Greece) Sapfo Sakellaridi (Romania) Oana Gavrilă	6–2, 4–6, [7–10]

== National representation ==
=== Doubles: 1 (silver medal) ===
Result	Date	Tournament	Surface	Partner	Opponents	Score
Silver	Aug 2026	Mediterranean Games, Taranto	Hard	(Spain) Alejo Sánchez Quílez	(Italy) Vittoria Paganetti (Italy) Filippo Romano	4–6, 2–6
