= Equestrian at the 2026 Mediterranean Games =

- Dates: 30 August – 1 September
- Nations: 15

The equestrian events at the 2026 Mediterranean Games were held in San Giorgio Ionico, Italy, from 30 August to 1 September 2026.

== Medal summary ==
Event	Gold	Silver	Bronze
Individual jumping	Carlos Bosch on Jolie van der Berghoeve; Spain	Hasan Şentürk on Nespresso van 'T Laekhof; Turkey	El Ghali Boukaa on Ike 1348; Morocco
Team jumping	France; Thomas Lambert on Jackpot E.B. Jérémy Le Roi on Falkira de Mormoulins; Sofian Misraoui on Geniale Lulu; Dylan Ringot on Garrison	Spain; Carlos Bosch on Jolie van der Berghoeve; Alex Codina on London Blue; Pello Elorduy on Champenoise de Rampan; Bautista Rodríguez on Vivoulette	Morocco; Ali Al-Ahrach on Chac on Jt Z Abdeslam Bennani on Mister D'Eclipse; El Ghali Boukaa on Ike 1348; Abdelkebir Ouaddar on Festival D'Argouges

== Medal table ==
Rank	Nation	Gold	Silver	Bronze	Total
1	Spain	1	1	0	2
2	France	1	0	0	1
3	Turkey	0	1	0	1
4	Morocco	0	0	2	2
Totals (4 entries)		2	2	2	6
