= Pilar Pérez =

Spanish tennis player (born 1973)

- Country (sports): Spain
- Born: 22 September 1973 (age 51)
- Prize money: $14,446

Singles
- Career record: 40–25
- Career titles: 0
- Highest ranking: No. 191 (21 October 1991)

Doubles
- Career record: 2–6
- Career titles: 0
- Highest ranking: No. 562 (24 September 1990)
Mediterranean Games
Silver medal – second place	1991 Athens	Women's Singles
Bronze medal – third place	1991 Athens	Women's Doubles

Pilar Pérez (born 22 September 1973) is a former professional tennis player from Spain.

== Biography ==
Pérez, who began competing on the ITF circuit in the 1989 season, was the Orange Bowl champion in 1990, becoming the first Spanish female to win the prestigious junior tournament.

As a 16-year old she featured in two Federation Cup ties for Spain, as the doubles partner of Conchita Martínez. Pérez and Martinez were beaten in both matches. This included the deciding rubber of the 1990 World Group semifinal against the USSR, as a replacement for Arantxa Sánchez Vicario, who was injured during her singles match.

She played only briefly on the WTA Tour, from 1990 to 1991.

At the 1991 Mediterranean Games, Pérez won a silver in the singles and a bronze in the doubles event.

== ITF Circuit finals ==
=== Singles: 1 (runner-up) ===
Result	Date	Tournament	Surface	Opponent	Score
Loss	5 November 1990	ITF Lerida, Spain	Hard	(Spain) Silvia Ramón-Cortés	3–6, 4–6

== See also ==
- List of Spain Fed Cup team representatives

Sporting positions
Preceded by (United States) Luanne Spadea	Orange Bowl Girls' Singles Champion; Category: 18 and under 1990	Succeeded by (Soviet Union) Elena Likhovtseva
