= Trofeo Bonfiglio =

Tournament information
- Founded: 1959
- Location: Milan; Italy
- Venue: Tennis Club Milano Alberto Bonacossa
- Category: ITF Junior Grade A (1978–2022); J500 (2023–present)
- Surface: Red clay - outdoors
- Draw: 64S / 64Q / 32D
- Website: www.tcmbonacossa.it

The Trofeo Bonfiglio ("Bonfiglio Trophy"), also known as the Campionati Internazionali d'Italia Juniores ("International Junior Championships of Italy"), is a junior tennis tournament held on outdoor red clay courts in Milan, Italy. It is one of seven J500 tournaments, the junior equivalent of ATP Masters or WTA 1000 events in terms of rankings points allocated. The tournament is contested in late May right before the French Open.

== History ==
The Trofeo Bonfiglio has been classified as a Grade A tournament since 1978. Together with the Orange Bowl, it is one of the two oldest Grade A events to feature both boys' and girls' competitions. The tournament began in 1959 to honor Antonio Bonfiglio, a promising Italian junior player from Milan who died at age 19 due to pneumonia. Several winners of the tournament have gone on to win grand slam singles titles, including Ivan Lendl, Jim Courier, Goran Ivanišević, Adriano Panatta and Yevgeny Kafelnikov among the boys' champions, as well as Virginia Wade, Chris O'Neil, Gabriela Sabatini, and Sloane Stephens among the girls' champions.

== Singles champions ==
Year	Boys	Girls
1959	(Italy) Sergio Tacchini	Not played
1960	(Socialist Federal Republic of Yugoslavia) Boro Jovanović	Not played
1961	(Italy) Luciano Borghi	Not played
1962	(France) Jean-Claude Barclay	Not played
1963	(Czechoslovakia) Milan Holeček	(United Kingdom) Virginia Wade
1964	(Greece) Nicholas Kalogeropoulos	(Czechoslovakia) Vlasta Kodešová
1965	(Greece) Nicholas Kalogeropoulos	(Netherlands) Trudy Groenman
1966	(South Africa) Bob Maud	(Czechoslovakia) Marie Neumanová
1967	(Czechoslovakia) Jan Kodeš	(Czechoslovakia) Marie Neumanová
1968	(Czechoslovakia) Vladimír Zedník	(United Kingdom) Winnie Shaw
1969	(Australia) John Alexander	(Finland) Birgitta Lindström
1970	(Australia) John Alexander	(Uruguay) Fiorella Bonicelli
1971	(Italy) Adriano Panatta	(South Africa) Brenda Kirk
1972	(Italy) Corrado Barazzutti	(Uruguay) Fiorella Bonicelli
1973	(Poland) Wojciech Fibak	(Czechoslovakia) Renáta Tomanová
1974	(Spain) José Moreno	(Czechoslovakia) Renáta Tomanová
1975	(Hungary) Balázs Taróczy	(Czechoslovakia) Hana Hublerova
1976	(Czechoslovakia) Tomáš Šmíd	(United States) Chris O'Neil
1977	(Italy) Gianni Ocleppo	(France) Frédérique Thibault
1978	(Czechoslovakia) Ivan Lendl	(Argentina) Viviana González
1979	Not played	
1980	(France) Thierry Tulasne	(United States) Susan Mascarin
1981	(Socialist Federal Republic of Yugoslavia) Slobodan Živojinović	(Australia) Anne Minter
1982	(France) Guy Forget	(United States) Gretchen Rush
1983	(Italy) Michele Fioroni	(Socialist Federal Republic of Yugoslavia) Sabrina Goleš
1984	(United States) Luke Jensen	(Argentina) Gabriela Sabatini
1985	(Italy) Antonio Padovani	(Argentina) Patricia Tarabini
1986	(Argentina) Franco Davín	(Argentina) Bettina Fulco
1987	(United States) Jim Courier	(Soviet Union) Natasha Zvereva
1988	(Socialist Federal Republic of Yugoslavia) Goran Ivanišević	(Argentina) Cristina Tessi
1989	(Italy) Stefano Pescosolido	(Argentina) Florencia Labat
1990	(United States) Ivan Baron	(Italy) Silvia Farina Elia
1991	(Australia) Grant Doyle	(Czechoslovakia) Zdeňka Málková
1992	(Russia) Yevgeny Kafelnikov	(Paraguay) Rossana de los Ríos
1993	(Venezuela) Jimy Szymanski	(Georgia (country)) Nino Louarsabishvili
1994	(Argentina) Federico Browne	(Russia) Tatiana Panova
1995	(Argentina) Mariano Zabaleta	(Russia) Anna Kournikova
1996	(France) Olivier Mutis	(Belarus) Olga Barabanschikova
1997	(Italy) Florian Allgauer	(Slovenia) Katarina Srebotnik
1998	(Argentina) Guillermo Coria	(Italy) Antonella Serra Zanetti
1999	(Denmark) Kristian Pless	(Russia) Lina Krasnoroutskaya
2000	(Bulgaria) Todor Enev	(Romania) Ioana Gaspar
2001	(Colombia) Alejandro Falla	(Estonia) Kaia Kanepi
2002	(Argentina) Brian Dabul	(Czech Republic) Barbora Strýcová
2003	(Spain) Nicolás Almagro	(Netherlands) Michaëlla Krajicek
2004	(Germany) Sebastian Rieschick	(Bulgaria) Sesil Karatantcheva
2005	(Croatia) Petar Jelenić	(Slovakia) Dominika Cibulková
2006	(France) Jonathan Eysseric	(Romania) Ioana Raluca Olaru
2007	(Italy) Matteo Trevisan	(Russia) Anastasia Pivovarova
2008	(Argentina) Guido Pella	(Romania) Simona Halep
2009	(Argentina) Facundo Argüello	(United States) Sloane Stephens
2010	(Russia) Mikhail Biryukov	(United States) Beatrice Capra
2011	(Slovakia) Filip Horanský	(Russia) Irina Khromacheva
2012	(Italy) Gianluigi Quinzi	(Czech Republic) Kateřina Siniaková
2013	(Germany) Alexander Zverev	(Switzerland) Belinda Bencic
2014	(Russia) Roman Safiullin	(United States) Catherine Bellis
2015	(Brazil) Orlando Luz	(Czech Republic) Markéta Vondroušová
2016	(Greece) Stefanos Tsitsipas	(Russia) Olesya Pervushina
2017	(Australia) Alexei Popyrin	(Russia) Elena Rybakina
2018	(Bulgaria) Adrian Andreev	(Luxembourg) Eléonora Molinaro
2019	(Czech Republic) Jonáš Forejtek	(United States) Alexa Noel
2020	Tournament cancelled due to the COVID-19 pandemic	
2021	(Peru) Gonzalo Bueno	(Philippines) Alexandra Eala
2022	(United States) Nishesh Basavareddy	(Switzerland) Céline Naef
2023	(Mexico) Rodrigo Pacheco Méndez	(United States) Kaitlin Quevedo
2024	(United States) Kaylan Bigun	(Australia) Emerson Jones
2025	(Italy) Jacopo Vasamì	(Serbia) Luna Vujović
2026	(Germany) Jamie Mackenzie	(China) Sun Xinran

== Doubles champions ==
Year	Boys	Girls
1990	(United States) Will Bull (United States) Brian MacPhie	(Soviet Union) Tatiana Ignatieva (Soviet Union) Irina Sukhova
1991	(Australia) Grant Doyle (Australia) Joshua Eagle	(Socialist Federal Republic of Yugoslavia) Ivona Horvat (Czechoslovakia) Eva Martincová
1992	(Italy) Massimo Bertolini (Italy) Mosé Navarra	(Belgium) Laurence Courtois (Belgium) Nancy Feber
1993	(Sweden) Thomas Johansson (Sweden) Magnus Norman	(United States) Cristina Moros (United States) Stephanie Nickitas
1994	(Australia) Ben Ellwood (Australia) Mark Philippoussis	(Slovakia) Michaela Hasanová (Slovakia) Martina Nedelková
1995	(Argentina) Guillermo Cañas (Argentina) Martín García	(Italy) Alice Canepa (Italy) Giulia Casoni
1996	(United Kingdom) Martin Lee (United Kingdom) James Trotman	(Italy) Alice Canepa (Italy) Giulia Casoni
1997	(South Africa) Jaco van der Westhuizen (South Africa) Wesley Whitehouse	(Slovenia) Tina Hergold (Slovenia) Tina Pisnik
1998	(Venezuela) José de Armas (Chile) Fernando González	finale not played
1999	(Argentina) Guillermo Coria (Argentina) David Nalbandian	(Italy) Flavia Pennetta (Italy) Roberta Vinci
2000	(France) Julien Cassaigne (United States) Andy Roddick	(Romania) Ioana Gaspar (Ukraine) Tatiana Perebiynis
2001	(Czech Republic) Tomáš Berdych (Netherlands) Bart de Gier	(Czech Republic) Petra Cetkovská (Croatia) Matea Mezak
2002	(Australia) Adam Feeney (Australia) Chris Guccione	(Germany) Anna-Lena Grönefeld (Czech Republic) Barbora Strýcová
2003	(Serbia and Montenegro) Novak Djokovic (Serbia and Montenegro) Viktor Troicki	(Slovakia) Jarmila Gajdošová (Czech Republic) Andrea Hlaváčková
2004	(United States) Brendan Evans (United States) Scott Oudsema	(Belarus) Victoria Azarenka (Belarus) Olga Govortsova
2005	(Russia) Evgeny Kirillov (Ukraine) Denys Molchanov	(Russia) Ekaterina Makarova (Russia) Evgeniya Rodina
2006	(Czech Republic) Roman Jebavý (Chile) Hans Podlipnik-Castillo	(Romania) Sorana Cîrstea (Russia) Alexandra Panova
2007	(Netherlands) Roy Bruggeling (Netherlands) Thomas Schoorel	(Slovakia) Klaudia Boczová (Slovakia) Kristína Kučová
2008	(Brazil) Henrique Cunha (Mexico) César Ramírez	(Netherlands) Lesley Kerkhove (Netherlands) Arantxa Rus
2009	(Germany) Richard Becker (Germany) Dominik Schulz	(Poland) Magda Linette (Belarus) Anna Orlik
2010	(Peru) Duilio Beretta (Colombia) Roberto Quiroz	(Slovenia) Nastja Kolar (Slovakia) Chantal Škamlová
2011	(United Kingdom) Liam Broady (United Kingdom) Oliver Golding	(Russia) Irina Khromacheva (Montenegro) Danka Kovinić
2012	(United Kingdom) Liam Broady (United Kingdom) Joshua Ward-Hibbert	(Canada) Françoise Abanda (United States) Sachia Vickery
2013	(Germany) Johannes Härteis (Germany) Hannes Wagner	(France) Fiona Ferro (France) Margot Yerolymos
2014	(Poland) Kamil Majchrzak (Poland) Jan Zieliński	(Australia) Priscilla Hon (Switzerland) Jil Teichmann
2015	(Poland) Michał Dembek (Finland) Patrik Niklas-Salminen	(Czech Republic) Miriam Kolodziejová (Czech Republic) Markéta Vondroušová
2016	(Canada) Benjamin Sigouin (Germany) Louis Wessels	(Russia) Olesya Pervushina (Russia) Anastasia Potapova
2017	(Argentina) Axel Geller (Colombia) Nicolás Mejía	(United States) Caty McNally (United States) Whitney Osuigwe
2018	(United States) Govind Nanda (United States) Tyler Zink	(Japan) Yuki Naito (Japan) Naho Sato
2019	(Australia) Tristan Schoolkate (Australia) Dane Sweeny	(Japan) Natsumi Kawaguchi (Hungary) Adrienn Nagy
2020	Tournament cancelled due to the COVID-19 pandemic	
2021	(Lithuania) Edas Butvilas (Lithuania) Vilius Gaubas	(Philippines) Alexandra Eala (United States) Madison Sieg
2022	(United States) Nishesh Basavareddy (United States) Aidan Kim	(Croatia) Lucija Ćirić Bagarić (Belgium) Sofia Costoulas
2023	Yaroslav Demin (Mexico) Rodrigo Pacheco Méndez	(Italy) Noemi Basiletti (Italy) Gaia Maduzzi
2024	(United States) Maxwell Exsted (United States) Cooper Woestendick	(Bulgaria) Iva Ivanova (Czech Republic) Alena Kovačková
2025	(Germany) Jamie Mackenzie (Germany) Niels McDonald	(Czech Republic) Alena Kovačková (Czech Republic) Jana Kovačková
2026	(Brazil) Luís Guto Miguel (Brazil) Leonardo Storck França	(Spain) Charo Esquiva Bañuls (Brazil) Nauhany Vitória Leme da Silva
