= Tennis at the 2026 Mediterranean Games =

Tennis competition

- Venue: Magna Grecia Tennis Center
- Dates: 25–31 August

The tennis competitions at the 2026 Mediterranean Games in Taranto took place from 25 to 31 August at the Magna Grecia Tennis Center. Athletes competed in five events.

== Medalists ==
Event	Gold	Silver	Bronze
Men's singles	Karim Bennani; Morocco	Alejo Sánchez Quílez; Spain	Carlo Alberto Caniato; Italy
Men's doubles	Morocco; Yassine Dlimi; Younes Lalami	Spain; Àlex Martí Pujolràs; Alejo Sánchez Quílez	Cyprus; Melios Efstathiou; Eleftherios Neos
Women's singles	Noemi Basiletti; Italy	Martha Matoula; Greece	Yasmine Kabbaj; Morocco
Women's doubles	Greece; Elena Korokozidi; Martha Matoula	Italy; Noemi Basiletti; Vittoria Paganetti	Turkey; Çağla Büyükakçay; Berfu Cengiz
Mixed doubles	Italy; Vittoria Paganetti; Filippo Romano	Spain; Lucía Cortez Llorca; Alejo Sánchez Quílez	Morocco; Diae El Jardi; Younes Lalami

== Medal table ==
* Host nation (Italy)

Rank	Nation	Gold	Silver	Bronze	Total
1	Italy*	2	1	1	4
2	Morocco	2	0	2	4
3	Greece	1	1	0	2
4	Spain	0	3	0	3
5	Cyprus	0	0	1	1
5	Turkey	0	0	1	1
Totals (6 entries)		5	5	5	15
