= Gaia Maduzzi =

Italian tennis player (born 2006)

- Country (sports): Italy
- Born: April 30, 2006 (age 20) Caramagna Piemonte, Italy
- Plays: Right (two-handed backhand)
- Prize money: $25,921

Singles
- Career record: 58–42
- Career titles: 0
- Highest ranking: No. 621 (June 15, 2026)
- Current ranking: No. 623 (July 20, 2026)

Doubles
- Career record: 26–25
- Career titles: 3 ITF
- Highest ranking: No. 475 (June 22, 2026)
- Current ranking: No. 486 (July 20, 2026)
- Last updated on: July 26, 2026.

Gaia Maduzzi (born April 30, 2006) is an Italian tennis player. She has a career-high doubles ranking by the WTA of No. 475, achieved on 22 June 2026.

== Early life ==
Maduzzi was born in Caramagna Piemonte. She began playing tennis at the age of five. She trains at the Best Point Sport Village under coach Denis Fino.

== Career ==
In May 2023, Maduzzi won the Trofeo Bonfiglio doubles title with partner Noemi Basiletti.

In May 2026, she made her WTA Tour debut with a wildcard into the double main draw of the Italian Open partnering Vittoria Paganetti.

In July 2026, partnering with Paganetti, Maduzzi won the Internazionali di Cordenons, defeating Laura Hietaranta and Beatrise Zeltiņa in the final. She won the first major championship of her career.

== ITF Circuit finals ==
=== Singles: 1 (runner-ups) ===
Legend W15 tournaments (0–1)	Finals by surface Clay (0–1)

Result	W–L	Date	Tournament	Tier	Surface	Opponent	Score
Loss	0–1	Apr 2025	ITF Antalya, Turkey	W15	Clay	(Germany) Sonja Zhenikhova	1–6, 6–4, 3–6

=== Doubles: 8 (3 titles, 5 runner-ups) ===
Legend
W75 tournaments (1–0)
W50 tournaments (0–1)
W25/35 tournaments (2–4)

Result	W–L	Date	Tournament	Tier	Surface	Partner	Opponents	Score
Loss	0–1	Nov 2023	ITF Solarino, Italy	W25	Carpet	(Italy) Vittoria Paganetti	(Czech Republic) Linda Klimovičová (Czech Republic) Julie Štruplová	1–6, 7–6^{(4)}, [8–10]
Loss	0–2	Sep 2025	ITF Santa Margherita di Pula, Italy	W35	Clay	(Italy) Noemi Basiletti	(Sweden) Caijsa Hennemann (Sweden) Lisa Zaar	3–6, 3–6
Loss	0–3	Oct 2025	ITF Santa Margherita di Pula, Italy	W35	Clay	(Italy) Eleonora Alvisi	(Serbia) Anja Stanković (Bulgaria) Elizara Yaneva	5–7, 4–6
Loss	0–4	Nov 2025	ITF Ortisei, Italy	W50	Hard (i)	(Italy) Samira De Stefano	(Canada) Kayla Cross (United States) Anna Rogers	6–7^{(4)}, 6–7^{(7)}
Win	1–4	Jul 2026	ITF Turin, Italy	W35	Clay	(Italy) Vittoria Paganetti	(Italy) Jessica Bertoldo (Italy) Ginevra Parentini	6–2, 7–5
Win	2–4	Jul 2026	Internazionali di Cordenons, Italy	W75	Clay	(Italy) Vittoria Paganetti	(Finland) Laura Hietaranta (Latvia) Beatrise Zeltiņa	2–6, 6–4, [10–5]
Loss	2–5	Aug 2026	ITF Bydgoszcz, Poland	W35	Clay	(Italy) Viola Turini	(Hungary) Adrienn Nagy (Germany) Joëlle Steur	1–6, 7–6^{(6)}, [8–10]
Win	3–5	Aug 2026	ITF Kraków, Poland	W35	Clay	(Italy) Francesca Pace	(Poland) Daria Górska (Poland) Amelia Paszun	7–6^{(3)}, 6–4
