= El Ghali Boukaa =

Moroccan equestrian (born 1981)

Personal information
- Nationality: Moroccan
- Born: 28 September 1981 (age 44)

Sport
- Sport: Equestrian
Medal record
Equestrian
Representing Morocco
Mediterranean Games
Bronze medal – third place	2026 Taranto	Individual jumping
Bronze medal – third place	2026 Taranto	Team jumping

El Ghali Boukaa (born 28 September 1981) is a Moroccan equestrian, who has represented his country at international competitions. He competed in the individual jumping event at the 2020 Summer Olympics.
