= Noemi Basiletti =

Italian tennis player (born 2006)

- Country (sports): Italy
- Residence: Turin, Italy
- Born: 11 March 2006 (age 20) San Vincenzo, Livorno, Italy
- Plays: Right (two-handed backhand)
- Coach: Federico Maccari
- Prize money: $86,996

Singles
- Career record: 77–67
- Career titles: 1 ITF
- Highest ranking: No. 243 (28 September 2026)
- Current ranking: No. 243 (28 September 2026)

Doubles
- Career record: 34–39
- Career titles: 2 ITF
- Highest ranking: No. 352 (29 June 2026)
- Current ranking: No. 467 (28 September 2026)
- Last updated on: 30 September 2026.

Noemi Basiletti
Medal record

Women's tennis

Representing Italy

Mediterranean Games
Gold medal – first place	2026 Taranto	Singles
Silver medal – second place	2026 Taranto	Doubles

Noemi Basiletti (born 11 March 2006) is an Italian professional tennis player. She has a career-high ITF junior combined ranking of No. 34, achieved on 2 September 2024.

== Early life ==
Basiletti was born in San Vincenzo, Livorno, to father Mauro and mother Paola. She has a younger sister, Asia. She began playing tennis at the age of six. In her youth, she trained at the Associazione Tennis San Vincenzo and the Prato Tennis Club. At the age of 14, she received a scholarship to train at the Rafa Nadal Academy until the age of 18.

== Junior career ==
In May 2023, Basiletti won the Trofeo Bonfiglio doubles title with partner Gaia Maduzzi. In June 2024, she reached the doubles quarterfinal of the French Open with partner Joy de Zeeuw. That August, she won both the singles and doubles titles at the J300 Internationaux de Tennis Junior event in Repentigny.

== Professional career ==
In September 2024, Basiletti reached her first professional doubles final at the W35 Forte Village ITF Trophy in Santa Margherita di Pula with compatriot Vittoria Paganetti, but the pair lost to Sapfo Sakellaridi and Arina Vasilescu. In December 2025, she began training in Turin under coach Federico Maccari, the brother-in-law of former Italian footballer Leonardo Bonucci.

In May 2026, she qualified for her first WTA Tour main draw at the Italian Open, claiming two consecutive top-100 wins in the process against Emiliana Arango and Daria Snigur. In the main draw, she also defeated lucky loser Ajla Tomljanović in the first round to claim her third consecutive top-100 win and first WTA Tour main draw match win. At the Mediterranean Games later that year, she won the women's singles gold medal and the women's doubles silver medal, partnering Vittoria Paganetti in the latter.

== ITF Circuit finals ==
=== Singles: 1 (title) ===
Legend W75 tournaments (1–0)	Finals by surface Clay (1–0)

Result	W–L	Date	Tournament	Tier	Surface	Opponent	Score
Win	1–0	Aug 2026	ITF Koksijde, Belgium	W75	Clay	(Czech Republic) Barbora Palicová	2–6, 7–5, 7–5

=== Doubles: 5 (2 titles, 3 runner-ups) ===
Legend W35 tournaments (2–3)	Finals by surface Clay (2–3)

Result	W–L	Date	Tournament	Tier	Surface	Partner	Opponents	Score
Loss	0–1	Sep 2024	ITF Santa Margherita di Pula, Italy	W35	Clay	(Italy) Vittoria Paganetti	(Greece) Sapfo Sakellaridi (Romania) Arina Vasilescu	2–6, 2–6
Win	1–1	Jun 2025	Rome Cup, Italy	W35	Clay	(Italy) Giorgia Pedone	(Italy) Francesca Pace (Italy) Sofia Rocchetti	6–3, 6–1
Loss	1–2	Jul 2025	ITF Turin, Italy	W35	Clay	(Italy) Federica Urgesi	(Greece) Valentini Grammatikopoulou (Sweden) Lisa Zaar	3–6, 6–7^{(3)}
Win	2–2	Sep 2025	ITF Santa Margherita di Pula, Italy	W35	Clay	(Italy) Giorgia Pedone	(Italy) Marta Lombardini (Italy) Jennifer Ruggeri	6–2, 6–7^{(6)}, [10–8]
Loss	2–3	Sep 2025	ITF Santa Margherita di Pula, Italy	W35	Clay	(Italy) Gaia Maduzzi	(Sweden) Caijsa Hennemann (Sweden) Lisa Zaar	3–6, 3–6
