= Vittoria Paganetti =

Italian tennis player (born 2006)

- Country (sports): Italy
- Born: 17 June 2006 (age 20) Bari, Italy
- Plays: Right (two-handed backhand)
- Coach: Raffaele Gorgoglione
- Prize money: $63,257

Singles
- Career record: 76–61
- Career titles: 1 ITF
- Highest ranking: No. 399 (10 November 2025)
- Current ranking: No. 487 (28 September 2026)

Doubles
- Career record: 38–30
- Career titles: 4 ITF
- Highest ranking: No. 269 (14 September 2026)
- Current ranking: No. 276 (28 September 2026)
- Last updated on: 30 September 2026.

Vittoria Paganetti
Medal record

Women's tennis

Representing Italy

Mediterranean Games
| Gold medal – first place | 2026 Taranto | Mixed doubles |
| Silver medal – second place | 2026 Taranto | Doubles |

Vittoria Paganetti (born 17 June 2006) is an Italian professional tennis player. She has career-high rankings of No. 399 in singles, reached on 10 November 2025, and No. 269 in doubles, achieved on 14 September 2026.

== Early life ==
Paganetti was born and raised in Bari. She began playing tennis at the age of five. She trains at the Circolo Tennis Bari under coach Raffaele Gorgoglione.

== Juniors ==
In January 2024, Paganetti made her junior major debut at the Australian Open where she reached the second round in singles. Later that year, she and Emerson Jones reached back-to-back Grand Slam tournament semifinals at the French Open and Wimbledon.

== Professional tour ==
In September 2022, Paganetti made her WTA 125 debut with a wildcard into the Open delle Puglie, but lost in the first round to Laura Pigossi. She also received a wildcard into the 2023 tournament, but lost in the first round to Carole Monnet. In November 2023, she and Gaia Maduzzi were the runners-up in the W25 Archigen Cup in Solarino, losing the final to Linda Klimovičová and Julie Štruplová.

In May 2024, after passing the qualifying, she made her WTA Tour debut with a wildcard into the main draw of the Italian Open but lost in the first round to compatriot Lucrezia Stefanini. She was only the fourth player from Apulia to make the main draw in Rome. That July, she reached the semifinals of the W15 Rimini Cup in Viserba as a junior exempt entry. In June 2025, she won her first professional singles title at the W35 Tarvisio Tennis Cup as a wildcard entrant, defeating Nika Radišić in the final.

At the Mediterranean Games in September 2026, she won the mixed doubles gold medal and the women's doubles silver medal, partnering Filippo Romano and Noemi Basiletti, respectively.

== Performance timeline ==
Key
| W | F | SF | QF | #R | RR | Q# | DNQ | A | NH |

(W) winner; (F) finalist; (SF) semifinalist; (QF) quarterfinalist; (#R) rounds 4, 3, 2, 1; (RR) round-robin stage; (Q#) qualification round; (DNQ) did not qualify; (A) absent; (NH) not held; (SR) strike rate (events won / competed); (W–L) win–loss record.
To avoid confusion and double counting, these charts are updated at the conclusion of a tournament or when the player's participation has ended.

=== Singles ===
Current through the 2026 Italian Open.

| Tournament | 2024 | 2025 | 2026 | SR | W–L |
|---|---|---|---|---|---|
WTA 1000 tournaments
| Italian Open | 1R | A | A | 0 / 1 | 0–1 |
| Win–loss | 0–1 | 0–0 | 0–0 | 0 / 1 | 0–1 |

== ITF World Tour finals ==
=== Singles: 1 (title) ===
Legend
W35 tournaments (1–0)

| Result | W–L | Date | Tournament | Tier | Surface | Opponent | Score |
|---|---|---|---|---|---|---|---|
| Win | 1–0 | Jun 2025 | ITF Tarvisio, Italy | W35 | Clay | (Slovenia) Nika Radišić | 6–0, 6–4 |

=== Doubles: 8 (4 titles, 4 runner-ups) ===
Legend
W75 tournaments (1–0)
W50 tournaments (0–1)
W25/35 tournaments (2–3)
W15 tournaments (1–0)

| Result | W–L | Date | Tournament | Tier | Surface | Partner | Opponents | Score |
|---|---|---|---|---|---|---|---|---|
| Loss | 0–1 | Nov 2023 | ITF Solarino, Italy | W25 | Carpet | (Italy) Gaia Maduzzi | (Czech Republic) Linda Klimovičová (Czech Republic) Julie Štruplová | 1–6, 7–6^{(4)}, [8–10] |
| Loss | 0–2 | Sep 2024 | ITF Santa Margherita di Pula, Italy | W35 | Clay | (Italy) Noemi Basiletti | (Greece) Sapfo Sakellaridi (Romania) Arina Vasilescu | 2–6, 2–6 |
| Win | 1–2 | Feb 2025 | ITF Antalya, Turkey | W15 | Clay | (Italy) Lisa Pigato | (Slovenia) Živa Falkner (Japan) Yuki Naito | 6–3, 6–4 |
| Win | 2–2 | Oct 2025 | ITF Lagos, Portugal | W35 | Hard | (France) Alice Tubello | (France) Yasmine Mansouri (Serbia) Elena Milovanović | 7–5, 3–6, [10–4] |
| Loss | 2–3 | Mar 2026 | ITF Heraklion, Greece | W50 | Clay | (Bulgaria) Rositsa Dencheva | (Czech Republic) Alena Kovačková (Czech Republic) Jana Kovačková | 4–6, 3–6 |
| Win | 3–3 | Jul 2026 | ITF Turin, Italy | W35 | Clay | (Italy) Gaia Maduzzi | (Italy) Jessica Bertoldo (Italy) Ginevra Parentini | 6–2, 7–5 |
| Win | 4–3 | Jul 2026 | Internazionali di Cordenons, Italy | W75 | Clay | (Italy) Gaia Maduzzi | (Finland) Laura Hietaranta (Latvia) Beatrise Zeltiņa | 2–6, 6–4, [10–5] |
| Loss | 4–4 | Oct 2026 | ITF Marsa, Malta | W35 | Hard | (Italy) Federica Urgesi | (Greece) Valentini Grammatikopoulou (United Kingdom) Esther Adeshina | 1–6, 3–6 |
