= 2026 Italian Open – Women's singles =

Women's singles
- 2026 Italian Open

Final
- Champion: (Ukraine) Elina Svitolina
- Runner-up: (United States) Coco Gauff
- Score: 6–4, 6–7^{(3–7)}, 6–2

Details
- Draw: 96 (12Q, 8WC)
- Seeds: 32

Events
Singles	men	women
Doubles	men	women
- Italian Open

Elina Svitolina defeated Coco Gauff in the final, 6–4, 6–7^{(3–7)}, 6–2 to win the women's singles tennis title at the 2026 Italian Open. It was her third Italian Open title (after 2017 and 2018) and fifth WTA 1000-level title overall. At 31 years and eight months old, Svitolina became the oldest woman to win three titles at the same WTA 1000 event and the oldest player to defeat three top-5 opponents at a single WTA 1000 event (overtaking the previous records held by Serena Williams at the Miami Open).

Jasmine Paolini was the defending champion, but lost in the third round to Elise Mertens.

Aryna Sabalenka's defeat in the third round to Sorana Cîrstea ended her streak of 17 consecutive tournament quarterfinals, dating back to the 2025 Indian Wells Open. At 36 years and 32 days old, Cîrstea became the oldest women’s player in the Open Era to record their first career win over a reigning world No. 1, the oldest to defeat a world No. 1 on a clay court, and the oldest to do so from a set down on any surface. Following the event, she also became the oldest women’s player to make their Top 20 debut in WTA rankings history.

== Seeds ==
All seeds received a bye into the second round.

1. Aryna Sabalenka (third round)
2. (Kazakhstan) Elena Rybakina (quarterfinals)
3. (United States) Coco Gauff (final)
4. (Poland) Iga Świątek (semifinals)
5. (United States) Jessica Pegula (quarterfinals)
6. (United States) Amanda Anisimova (withdrew)
7. (Ukraine) Elina Svitolina (champion)
8. Mirra Andreeva (quarterfinals)
9. (Italy) Jasmine Paolini (third round)
10. (Canada) Victoria Mboko (withdrew)
11. (Czech Republic) Karolína Muchová (second round)
12. (Switzerland) Belinda Bencic (third round)
13. (Czech Republic) Linda Nosková (fourth round)
14. Ekaterina Alexandrova (second round)
15. (Japan) Naomi Osaka (fourth round)
16. (United States) Iva Jovic (fourth round)
17. (United States) Madison Keys (third round)
18. (Denmark) Clara Tauson (second round, retired)
19. Diana Shnaider (third round)
20. Liudmila Samsonova (third round)
21. (Belgium) Elise Mertens (fourth round)
22. Anna Kalinskaya (fourth round)
23. (Ukraine) Marta Kostyuk (withdrew)
24. (Czech Republic) Marie Bouzková (second round)
25. (Canada) Leylah Fernandez (second round)
26. (Romania) Sorana Cîrstea (semifinals)
27. (United Kingdom) Emma Raducanu (withdrew)
28. (United States) Emma Navarro (second round)
29. (Australia) Maya Joint (second round)
30. (Spain) Cristina Bucșa (second round)
31. (China) Wang Xinyu (second round)
32. (United States) Hailey Baptiste (third round)
33. (Romania) Jaqueline Cristian (second round)

Click on the seed number of a player to go to their draw section.

== Draw ==
Key

- Q = Qualifier
- WC = Wild card
- LL = Lucky loser
- Alt = Alternate
- ITF = ITF entry
- PR = Protected ranking
- SR = Special ranking
- SE = Special exempt
- JE = Junior exempt
- JR = Junior Accelerator Programme entrant
- CO = College Accelerator Programme entrant
- NG = Next Gen Accelerator Program entrant
- w/o = Walkover
- r = Retired
- d = Defaulted

=== Finals ===
Quarterfinals
26	(Romania) Sorana Cîrstea	6	7^{7}
(Latvia) Jeļena Ostapenko	1	6^{0}
3	(United States) Coco Gauff	4	6	6
8	Mirra Andreeva	6	2	4
5	(United States) Jessica Pegula	1	2
4	(Poland) Iga Świątek	6	6
7	(Ukraine) Elina Svitolina	2	6	6
2	(Kazakhstan) Elena Rybakina	6	4	4

Semifinals
26	(Romania) Sorana Cîrstea	4	3
3	(United States) Coco Gauff	6	6
4	(Poland) Iga Świątek	4	6	2
7	(Ukraine) Elina Svitolina	6	2	6

Final
3	(United States) Coco Gauff	4	7^{7}	2
7	(Ukraine) Elina Svitolina	6	6^{3}	6

=== Top half ===
==== Section 1 ====
First round
(Czech Republic) B Krejčíková	6	6
(France) E Jacquemot	2	4
(Poland) M Linette	0	3
(Germany) T Maria	6	6
(Croatia) P Marčinko	1	3
(Ukraine) O Oliynykova	6	6
A Zakharova	4	7	7^{8}
(Ukraine) D Yastremska	6	5	6^{6}

Second round
1	A Sabalenka	6	6
(Czech Republic) B Krejčíková	2	3
(Germany) T Maria	2	0
26	(Romania) S Cîrstea	6	6
18	(Denmark) C Tauson	1	1^{r}
(Ukraine) O Oliynykova	6	3
A Zakharova	4	1
13	(Czech Republic) L Nosková	6	6

Third round
1	A Sabalenka	6	3	5
26	(Romania) S Cîrstea	2	6	7
(Ukraine) O Oliynykova	1	3
13	(Czech Republic) L Nosková	6	6

Fourth round
26	(Romania) S Cîrstea	6	6
13	(Czech Republic) L Nosková	2	4

==== Section 2 ====
First round
(United States) S Kenin	4	5
WC	(Canada) B Andreescu	6	7
(Czech Republic) K Siniaková	6	6
(France) L Boisson	2	3
(Hungary) A Bondár	6	3	4
(China) Q Zheng	3	6	6
WC	(Italy) L Stefanini	0	1
(Latvia) J Ostapenko	6	6

Second round
12	(Switzerland) B Bencic	6	6
WC	(Canada) B Andreescu	4	1
(Czech Republic) K Siniaková	6	6^{4}	5
22	A Kalinskaya	4	7^{7}	7
30	(Spain) C Bucșa	6^{6}	2
(China) Q Zheng	7^{8}	6
(Latvia) J Ostapenko	2	6	6
LL	(Romania) E-G Ruse	6	2	3

Third round
12	(Switzerland) B Bencic	4	3
22	A Kalinskaya	6	6
(China) Q Zheng	6	4	4
(Latvia) J Ostapenko	4	6	6

Fourth round
22	A Kalinskaya	1	2
(Latvia) J Ostapenko	6	6

==== Section 3 ====
First round
(Kazakhstan) Y Putintseva	3	2
(Czech Republic) T Valentová	6	6
(Argentina) S Sierra	6	6
Q	(Germany) T Korpatsch	3	1
Q	(United States) T Townsend	6	6
WC	(Italy) N Brancaccio	3	2
(United States) M Kessler	6	5	6
WC	(Italy) L Bronzetti	3	7	4

Second round
3	(United States) C Gauff	6	6
(Czech Republic) T Valentová	3	4
(Argentina) S Sierra	6	6
Q	(Ukraine) A Kalinina	2	3
24	(Czech Republic) M Bouzková	3	5
Q	(United States) T Townsend	6	7
(United States) M Kessler	6^{5}	6^{4}
16	(United States) I Jovic	7^{7}	7^{7}

Third round
3	(United States) C Gauff	5	6	6
(Argentina) S Sierra	7	0	4
Q	(United States) T Townsend	5	2
16	(United States) I Jovic	7	6

Fourth round
3	(United States) C Gauff	5	7	6
16	(United States) I Jovic	7	5	2

==== Section 4 ====
First round
Q	(France) L Jeanjean	7^{8}	6
(Brazil) B Haddad Maia	6^{6}	4
(Hungary) P Udvardy	6	7^{7}
Q	A Korneeva	2	6^{2}
(Switzerland) V Golubic	6	6
Q	(Italy) F Urgesi	1	1
(Croatia) A Ružić	6	1	6
(Uzbekistan) K Rakhimova	4	6	3

Second round
9	(Italy) J Paolini	6^{4}	6	6
Q	(France) L Jeanjean	7^{7}	2	4
(Hungary) P Udvardy	4	2
21	(Belgium) E Mertens	6	6
29	(Australia) M Joint	5	2
(Switzerland) V Golubic	7	6
(Croatia) A Ružić	1	0
8	M Andreeva	6	6

Third round
9	(Italy) J Paolini	6	6^{5}	3
21	(Belgium) E Mertens	4	7^{7}	6
(Switzerland) V Golubic	1	6	0
8	M Andreeva	6	4	6

Fourth round
21	(Belgium) E Mertens	3	3
8	M Andreeva	6	6

=== Bottom half ===
==== Section 5 ====
First round
(Turkey) Z Sönmez	4	6	6
WC	(Italy) J Ruggeri	6	2	2
O Selekhmeteva	5	7	1
Q	(Switzerland) R Masarova	7	5	6
(United States) A Li	1	6	6
(China) S Zhang	6	4	2
Q	(Hungary) D Gálfi	7	2	4
Q	(Austria) A Potapova	5	6	6

Second round
5	(United States) J Pegula	6	6
(Turkey) Z Sönmez	4	0
Q	(Switzerland) R Masarova	4	6	6
25	(Canada) L Fernandez	6	4	4
20	L Samsonova	6	6
(United States) A Li	4	3
Q	(Austria) A Potapova	6	6
11	(Czech Republic) K Muchová	3	2

Third round
5	(United States) J Pegula	6	6
Q	(Switzerland) R Masarova	0	0
20	L Samsonova	3	2
Q	(Austria) A Potapova	6	6

Fourth round
5	(United States) J Pegula	7^{8}	6
Q	(Austria) A Potapova	6^{6}	2

==== Section 6 ====
First round
(United Kingdom) K Boulter	4	6	4
(Germany) E Lys	6	3	6
WC	(Italy) M Trevisan	4	6	3
(Australia) T Gibson	6	0	6
(Italy) E Cocciaretto	6	6
Q	(Austria) S Kraus	2	4
(United States) C McNally	6	6
(Australia) D Kasatkina	2	3

Second round
15	(Japan) N Osaka	6	4	6
(Germany) E Lys	4	6	3
(Australia) T Gibson	7	1	1
19	D Shnaider	5	6	6
28	(United States) E Navarro	3	3
(Italy) E Cocciaretto	6	6
(United States) C McNally	1	7^{7}	3
4	(Poland) I Świątek	6	6^{5}	6

Third round
15	(Japan) N Osaka	6	6
19	D Shnaider	1	2
(Italy) E Cocciaretto	1	0
4	(Poland) I Świątek	6	6

Fourth round
15	(Japan) N Osaka	2	1
4	(Poland) I Świątek	6	6

==== Section 7 ====
First round
Q	(Italy) N Basiletti	7	6
LL	(Australia) A Tomljanović	5	4
(Ukraine) Y Starodubtseva	5	6	1
Q	(Switzerland) S Waltert	7	4	6
(United States) P Stearns	6	6
(Indonesia) J Tjen	4	4
WC	(Italy) L Pigato	6	2	4
WC	(Italy) TC Grant	1	6	6

Second round
7	(Ukraine) E Svitolina	6	6
Q	(Italy) N Basiletti	1	3
Q	(Switzerland) S Waltert	7^{11}	4	4
32	(United States) H Baptiste	6^{9}	6	6
17	(United States) M Keys	4	6	6
(United States) P Stearns	6	4	2
WC	(Italy) TC Grant	6	3	4
LL	(Czech Republic) N Bartůňková	4	6	6

Third round
7	(Ukraine) E Svitolina	6	6
32	(United States) H Baptiste	1	2
17	(United States) M Keys	3	6	4
LL	(Czech Republic) N Bartůňková	6	1	6

Fourth round
7	(Ukraine) E Svitolina	6	6
LL	(Czech Republic) N Bartůňková	2	3

==== Section 8 ====
First round
(Germany) L Siegemund	6	6
(Czech Republic) S Bejlek	4	4
PR	(Czech Republic) Ka Plíšková	4	6	7
(Spain) J Bouzas Maneiro	6	3	5
(Philippines) A Eala	6	3	6
(Poland) M Fręch	0	6	4
LL	(Austria) L Tagger	7	3	0
(Greece) M Sakkari	5	6	6

Second round
14	E Alexandrova	4	7^{7}	1
(Germany) L Siegemund	6	6^{4}	6
PR	(Czech Republic) Ka Plíšková	6^{5}	7^{7}	6
33	(Romania) J Cristian	7^{7}	6^{2}	4
31	(China) Xin Wang	4	3
(Philippines) A Eala	6	6
(Greece) M Sakkari	4	1
2	(Kazakhstan) E Rybakina	6	6

Third round
(Germany) L Siegemund	1	4
PR	(Czech Republic) Ka Plíšková	6	6
(Philippines) A Eala	4	3
2	(Kazakhstan) E Rybakina	6	6

Fourth round
PR	(Czech Republic) Ka Plíšková	0	2
2	(Kazakhstan) E Rybakina	6	6

== Seeded players ==
The following are the seeded players. Seedings are based on WTA rankings as of 20 April 2026. Rankings and points before are as of 4 May 2026.

^{‡}	Champion
^{†}	Runner-up

Seed	Rank	Player	Points before	Points defending	Points won	Points after	Status
1	1	Aryna Sabalenka	10,110	215	65	9,960	Third round lost to (Romania) Sorana Cirstea [26]
2	2	(Kazakhstan) Elena Rybakina	8,555	65	215	8,705	Quarterfinals lost to (Ukraine) Elina Svitolina [7]
3	4	(United States) Coco Gauff^{†}	6,749	650	650	6,749	Runner-up, lost to (Ukraine) Elina Svitolina [7]
4	3	(Poland) Iga Świątek	6,948	65	390	7,273	Semifinals lost to (Ukraine) Elina Svitolina [7]
5	5	(United States) Jessica Pegula	6,136	65	215	6,286	Quarterfinals lost to (Poland) Iga Świątek [4]
~~6~~	~~6~~	~~(United States) Amanda Anisimova~~	5,985	10+27	0+10	5,958	Withdrew due to left wrist injury
7	10	(Ukraine) Elina Svitolina^{‡}	3,530	215	1,000	4,315	Champion, defeated (United States) Coco Gauff [3]
8	7	Mirra Andreeva	4,181	215	215	4,181	Quarterfinals lost to (United States) Coco Gauff [3]
9	8	(Italy) Jasmine Paolini	3,722	1,000	65	2,787	Third round lost to (Belgium) Elise Mertens [21]
~~10~~	~~9~~	~~(Canada) Victoria Mboko~~	3,531	65+81	0+10	3,395	Withdrew due to illness
11	11	(Czech Republic) Karolína Muchová	3,318	(60)^{∆}	(60)^{Ω}	3,318	Second round lost to (Austria) Anastasia Potapova [Q]
12	12	(Switzerland) Belinda Bencic	3,090	10	65	3,145	Third round lost to Anna Kalinskaya [22]
13	13	(Czech Republic) Linda Nosková	2,999	65	120	3,054	Fourth round lost to (Romania) Sorana Cîrstea [26]
14	14	Ekaterina Alexandrova	2,669	0	10	2,679	Second round lost to (Germany) Laura Siegemund
15	16	(Japan) Naomi Osaka	2,341	120	120	2,341	Fourth round lost to (Poland) Iga Świątek [4]
16	17	(United States) Iva Jovic	2,235	(49)^{∆}	120	2,306	Fourth round lost to (United States) Coco Gauff [3]
17	19	(United States) Madison Keys	1,946	65	65	1,946	Third round lost to (Czech Republic) Nikola Bartůňková [LL]
18	18	(Denmark) Clara Tauson	2,030	120	10	1,920	Second round retired against (Ukraine) Oleksandra Oliynykova
19	20	Diana Shnaider	1,946	215	65	1,796	Third round lost to (Japan) Naomi Osaka [15]
20	21	Liudmila Samsonova	1,895	10	65	1,950	Third round lost to (Austria) Anastasia Potapova [Q]
21	22	(Belgium) Elise Mertens	1,858	120	120	1,858	Fourth round lost to Mirra Andreeva [8]
22	24	Anna Kalinskaya	1,758	10	120	1,868	Fourth round lost to (Latvia) Jeļena Ostapenko
~~23~~	~~15~~	~~(Ukraine) Marta Kostyuk~~	2,507	120	0	2,387	Withdrew due to right hip injury
24	26	(Czech Republic) Marie Bouzkova	1,651	65	10	1,596	Second round lost to (United States) Taylor Townsend [Q]
25	23	(Canada) Leylah Fernandez	1,851	65	10	1,796	Second round lost to (Switzerland) Rebeka Masarova [Q]
26	27	(Romania) Sorana Cîrstea	1,595	0	390	1,985	Semifinals lost to (United States) Coco Gauff [3]
~~27~~	~~30~~	~~(United Kingdom) Emma Raducanu~~	1,430	120	0	1,310	Withdrew due to illness
28	35	(United States) Emma Navarro	1,377	65	10	1,322	Second round lost to (Italy) Elisabetta Cocciaretto
29	34	(Australia) Maya Joint	1,380	30	10	1,360	Second round lost to (Switzerland) Viktorija Golubić
30	31	(Spain) Cristina Bucșa	1,406	(10)^{∆}	10	1,406	Second round lost to (China) Zheng Qinwen
31	33	(China) Wang Xinyu	1,401	10	10	1,401	Second round lost to (Philippines) Alexandra Eala
32	25	(United States) Hailey Baptiste	1,747	95+15	65+10	1,712	Third round lost to (Ukraine) Elina Svitolina [7]
33	28	(Romania) Jaqueline Cristian	1,437	65	10	1,382	Second round lost to (Czech Republic) Karolína Plíšková [PR]

∆ The player is defending points from her 18th best result or her sixth best combined WTA 1000 tournament result.
Ω The player is keeping her 18th best result as it is higher than the Rome result, which does not need to be counted in her ranking points.

== Other entry information ==
=== Wildcards ===
- (Canada) Bianca Andreescu
- (Italy) Nuria Brancaccio
- (Italy) Lucia Bronzetti
- (Italy) Tyra Caterina Grant
- (Italy) Lisa Pigato
- (Italy) Jennifer Ruggeri
- (Italy) Lucrezia Stefanini
- (Italy) Martina Trevisan

=== Protected ranking ===
- (Czech Republic) Karolína Plíšková

=== Withdrawals ===
- † (United States) Amanda Anisimova → replaced by (Romania) Elena Gabriela Ruse (LL)
- ‡ (France) Varvara Gracheva → replaced by (Germany) Eva Lys
- ‡ (United Kingdom) Sonay Kartal → replaced by (Turkey) Zeynep Sönmez
- † (Ukraine) Marta Kostyuk → replaced by (Australia) Ajla Tomljanović (LL)
- ‡ Veronika Kudermetova → replaced by (Croatia) Petra Marčinko
- † (Canada) Victoria Mboko → replaced by (Czech Republic) Nikola Bartůňková (LL)
- † (United Kingdom) Emma Raducanu → replaced by (Austria) Lilli Tagger (LL)
- ‡ (Czech Republic) Markéta Vondroušová → replaced by (Argentina) Solana Sierra

‡ – withdrew from entry list
† – withdrew from main draw

== Qualifying ==
=== Seeds ===
1. (Austria) Anastasia Potapova (qualified)
2. (Romania) Elena-Gabriela Ruse (qualifying competition, lucky loser)
3. (Australia) Kimberly Birrell (first round)
4. (Colombia) Camila Osorio (first round)
5. (United States) Alycia Parks (first round)
6. (Australia) Ajla Tomljanović (qualifying competition, lucky loser)
7. (Colombia) Emiliana Arango (first round)
8. (Mexico) Renata Zarazúa (first round)
9. Anna Blinkova (first round)
10. (United States) Taylor Townsend (qualified)
11. (Austria) Lilli Tagger (qualifying competition, lucky loser)
12. (Belgium) Hanne Vandewinkel (first round)
13. (Czech Republic) Nikola Bartůňková (qualifying competition, lucky loser)
14. (Japan) Moyuka Uchijima (first round)
15. (France) Diane Parry (first round)
16. (Slovenia) Veronika Erjavec (qualifying competition)
17. (Switzerland) Simona Waltert (qualified)
18. (Ukraine) Daria Snigur (qualifying competition)
19. (Germany) Tamara Korpatsch (qualified)
20. (Germany) Ella Seidel (first round)
21. (United States) Katie Volynets (qualifying competition)
22. (Austria) Sinja Kraus (qualified)
23. (New Zealand) Lulu Sun (first round)
24. (Austria) Julia Grabher (qualifying competition)

=== Qualifiers ===
1. (Austria) Anastasia Potapova
2. (Austria) Sinja Kraus
3. (Switzerland) Simona Waltert
4. (Ukraine) Anhelina Kalinina
5. (Hungary) Dalma Galfi
6. (France) Léolia Jeanjean
7. (Italy) Noemi Basiletti
8. (Italy) Federica Urgesi
9. (Germany) Tamara Korpatsch
10. (United States) Taylor Townsend
11. Alina Korneeva
12. (Switzerland) Rebeka Masarova

=== Lucky losers ===
1. (Australia) Ajla Tomljanović
2. (Austria) Lilli Tagger
3. (Romania) Elena-Gabriela Ruse
4. (Czech Republic) Nikola Bartůňková

=== Qualifying draw ===
==== First qualifier ====
First round
1	(Austria) Anastasia Potapova	6	7
PR	(Romania) Irina-Camelia Begu	1	5
(United States) Ashlyn Krueger	2	2
13	(Czech Republic) Nikola Bartůňková	6	6

Qualifying competition
1	(Austria) Anastasia Potapova	4	6	6
13	(Czech Republic) Nikola Bartůňková	6	4	2

==== Second qualifier ====
First round
2	(Romania) Elena-Gabriela Ruse	6	6
PR	(France) Océane Dodin	1	3
(Czech Republic) Dominika Šalková	2	2
22	(Austria) Sinja Kraus	6	6

Qualifying competition
2	(Romania) Elena-Gabriela Ruse	6^{3}	2
22	(Austria) Sinja Kraus	7^{7}	6

==== Third qualifier ====
First round
3	(Australia) Kimberly Birrell	3	2
(China) Yuan Yue	6	6
WC	(Italy) Giorgia Pedone	2	6^{4}
17	(Switzerland) Simona Waltert	6	7^{7}

Qualifying competition
(China) Yuan Yue	2	6	5
17	(Switzerland) Simona Waltert	6	1	7

==== Fourth qualifier ====
First round
4	(Colombia) Camila Osorio	3	5
(Ukraine) Anhelina Kalinina	6	7
(Latvia) Darja Semeņistaja	2	0
21	(United States) Katie Volynets	6	6

Qualifying competition
(Ukraine) Anhelina Kalinina	6	6
21	(United States) Katie Volynets	2	3

==== Fifth qualifier ====
First round
5	(United States) Alycia Parks	4	1
(Hungary) Dalma Gálfi	6	6
Aliaksandra Sasnovich	6	2	4
24	(Austria) Julia Grabher	4	6	6

Qualifying competition
(Hungary) Dalma Gálfi	7^{7}	6
24	(Austria) Julia Grabher	6^{2}	4

==== Sixth qualifier ====
First round
6	(Australia) Ajla Tomljanović	7	6
WC	(Italy) Marta Lombardini	5	1
(France) Léolia Jeanjean	6	7^{7}
15	(France) Diane Parry	1	6^{0}

Qualifying competition
6	(Australia) Ajla Tomljanović	6^{5}	7	3
(France) Léolia Jeanjean	7^{7}	5	6

==== Seventh qualifier ====
First round
7	(Colombia) Emiliana Arango	4	3
WC	(Italy) Noemi Basiletti	6	6
WC	(Italy) Samira De Stefano	2	3
18	(Ukraine) Daria Snigur	6	6

Qualifying competition
WC	(Italy) Noemi Basiletti	6	6^{8}	6
18	(Ukraine) Daria Snigur	3	7^{10}	4

==== Eighth qualifier ====
First round
8	(Mexico) Renata Zarazúa	4	6	3
WC	(Italy) Federica Urgesi	6	2	6
Anastasia Pavlyuchenkova	3	3^{r}
16	(Slovenia) Veronika Erjavec	6	2

Qualifying competition
WC	(Italy) Federica Urgesi	6	6
16	(Slovenia) Veronika Erjavec	4	1

==== Ninth qualifier ====
First round
9	Anna Blinkova	1	2
(Egypt) Mayar Sherif	6	6
WC	(Italy) Beatrice Ricci	6	1	2
19	(Germany) Tamara Korpatsch	3	6	6

Qualifying competition
(Egypt) Mayar Sherif	6	5	6^{5}
19	(Germany) Tamara Korpatsch	3	7	7^{7}

==== Tenth qualifier ====
First round
10	(United States) Taylor Townsend	3	7	6
(Slovakia) Rebecca Šramková	6	5	2
(Andorra) Victoria Jiménez Kasintseva	6	7^{7}
23	(New Zealand) Lulu Sun	4	6^{2}

Qualifying competition
10	(United States) Taylor Townsend	6	6
(Andorra) Victoria Jiménez Kasintseva	2	3

==== Eleventh qualifier ====
First round
11	(Austria) Lilli Tagger	7	6
(Netherlands) Suzan Lamens	5	2
Alina Korneeva	7^{7}	3	6
20	(Germany) Ella Seidel	6^{1}	6	2

Qualifying competition
11	(Austria) Lilli Tagger	3	3
Alina Korneeva	6	6

==== Twelfth qualifier ====
First round
12	(Belgium) Hanne Vandewinkel	4	3
PR	(Switzerland) Jil Teichmann	6	6
(Switzerland) Rebeka Masarova	6	6
14	(Japan) Moyuka Uchijima	3	2

Qualifying competition
PR	(Switzerland) Jil Teichmann	6	1	1
(Switzerland) Rebeka Masarova	1	6	6
