= Francesco Forti =

Italian tennis player

- Country (sports): Italy
- Residence: Cesenatico, Italy
- Born: 26 July 1999 (age 27) Cesena, Italy
- Height: 1.88 m (6 ft 2 in)
- Turned pro: 2018
- Plays: Right-handed (two-handed backhand)
- Coach: Giacomo Polidori
- Prize money: US $248,358

Singles
- Career record: 0–0
- Career titles: 0
- Highest ranking: No. 303 (4 December 2023)
- Current ranking: No. 323 (26 October 2026)

Doubles
- Career record: 0–2
- Career titles: 0; 2 Challenger
- Highest ranking: No. 173 (26 October 2026)
- Current ranking: No. 173 (26 October 2026)
- Last updated on: 26 October 2026.

Francesco Forti (born 26 July 1999) is an Italian professional tennis player. He has a career-high ATP singles ranking of No. 303 achieved on 4 December 2023 and a doubles ranking of No. 173 reached on 26 October 2026.

Forti plays mostly on the ATP Challenger Tour, where he has won two titles in doubles.

== ATP Challenger Tour finals ==
=== Doubles: 7 (5 titles, 2 runner-up) ===
Legend ATP Challenger Tour (5–2)	Finals by surface Hard (0–1) Clay (5–1)

Result	W–L	Date	Tournament	Tier	Surface	Partner	Opponents	Score
Win	1–0	Jul 2021	Internazionali Città di Todi, Italy	Challenger	Clay	(Italy) Giulio Zeppieri	(Argentina) Facundo Díaz Acosta (Peru) Alexander Merino	6–3, 6–2
Win	2–0	Aug 2023	Internazionali del Friuli Venezia Giulia, Italy	Challenger	Clay	(Italy) Giovanni Fonio	(India) Niki Kaliyanda Poonacha (Australia) Adam Taylor	5–7, 6–1, [10–7]
Loss	2–1	Feb 2026	Trofeo Città di Cesenatico, Italy	Challenger	Hard (i)	(Italy) Filippo Romano	(Netherlands) Jarno Jans (Netherlands) Niels Visker	6–7^{(7–9)}, 3–6
Win	3–1	May 2026	Challenger Città di Cervia, Italy	Challenger	Clay	(Italy) Filippo Romano	(Argentina) Santiago Rodríguez Taverna (Spain) David Vega Hernández	6–3, 6–4
Loss	3–2	May 2026	Internazionali Città di Vicenza, Italy	Challenger	Clay	(Switzerland) Rémy Bertola	(Sweden) Erik Grevelius (Sweden) Adam Heinonen	6–7^{(1–7)}, 6–7^{(5–7)}
Win	4–2	Jun 2026	Aspria Tennis Cup, Italy	Challenger	Clay	(Italy) Filippo Romano	(India) Siddhant Banthia (India) Arjun Kadhe	6–3, 7–6^{(7–5)}
Win	5–2	Sep 2026	Città di Biella, Italy	Challenger	Clay	(Italy) Filippo Romano	(Italy) Franco Agamenone (Argentina) Máximo Zeitune	4–6, 7–5, [10–8]
