= Morocco at the 2026 Mediterranean Games =

- IOC code: MAR
- NOC: Moroccan Olympic Committee

in Taranto, Italy 20 August 2026 – 3 September 2026
- Competitors: 120 in 18 sports
- Medals: Gold 16 Silver 9 Bronze 19 Total 44

Mediterranean Games appearances (overview)
- 1959; 1963; 1967; 1971; 1975; 1979; 1983; 1987; 1991; 1993; 1997; 2001; 2005; 2009; 2013; 2018; 2022; 2026

Morocco will compete at the 2026 Mediterranean Games in Taranto, Italy from 20 August to 3 September 2026, with delegation of 120 athletes, 72 men and 48 women, competing in 18 sports.

== Medal table ==
Medal	Name	Sport	Event	Date	Ref
Gold	Soufiane El Asbi	Taekwondo	Men's Taekwondo +80 kg	23 August	
Gold	Soulaimane Samghouli	Boxing	Boxing at the 2026 Mediterranean Games – Men's light welterweight 65 kg	27 August	
Gold	Saida Lahmidi	Boxing	Boxing at the 2026 Mediterranean Games – Women's light middleweight 70 kg	27 August	
Gold	Ahmed Cherifi	Judo	Judo at the 2026 Mediterranean Games 60 kg	28 August	
Gold	Fatima Birdaha	Athletics	Athletics at the 2026 Mediterranean Games 5000m	30 August	
Gold	Yassine Hssine	Athletics	Athletics at the 2026 Mediterranean Games 100m	30 August	
Gold	Yassine Dlimi Younes Lalami	Tennis	Tennis at the 2026 Mediterranean Games – Men's doubles	30 August	
Gold	Karim Bennani	Tennis	Tennis at the 2026 Mediterranean Games - Men's singles	31 August	
Gold	Chaimae Elhayti	Karate	Karate at the 2026 Mediterranean Games – Women's 55 kg	1 September	
Gold	Salma Lehlali	Athletics	Athletics at the 2026 Mediterranean Games Women's 400m	1 September	
Gold	Mehdi Sriti	Karate	Karate at the 2026 Mediterranean Games – Men's 84 kg	2 September	
Gold	Yassine Hssine	Athletics	Athletics at the 2026 Mediterranean Games Men's 200m	2 September	
Gold	Ismail Manyani	Athletics	Athletics at the 2026 Mediterranean Games Men's 400m Hurdles	2 September	
Gold	Salaheddine Ben Yazide	Athletics	Athletics at the 2026 Mediterranean Games Men's 3000m Steeplechase	2 September	
Gold	Hamza Hossaini	Artistic gymnastics	Artistic Gymnastics Men's vault	2 September	
Gold	Fatima Birdaha	Athletics	Athletics at the 2026 Mediterranean Games Women's Half Marathon	3 September	
Silver	Haitam Zarhouti	Taekwondo	Men's Taekwondo 80 kg	23 August	
Silver	Amina Dehhaoui	Taekwondo	Women's Taekwondo 57 kg	23 August	
Silver	Widad Bertal	Boxing	Boxing at the 2026 Mediterranean Games – Women's bantamweight 54 kg	27 August	
Silver	Soumiya Iraoui	Judo	Judo at the 2026 Mediterranean Games 52 kg	28 August	
Silver	Hassan Doukkali	Judo	Judo at the 2026 Mediterranean Games 73 kg	28 August	
Silver	Mohamed Tindouft	Athletics	Athletics at the 2026 Mediterranean Games Men's 3000m Steeplechase	2 September	
Silver	Souad Elhaddad	Athletics	Athletics at the 2026 Mediterranean Games Women's 1500m	2 September	
Silver	Mustapha Akkaoui	Athletics	Athletics at the 2026 Mediterranean Games Men's 10000m	2 September	
Silver	Rachid M'hamdi; Walid El Boussiri; Ismail Manyani; Mohamed Yassine Zerhoum	Athletics	Athletics at the 2026 Mediterranean Games Men's 4 x 400m Relay	2 September	
Bronze	Nada Laaraj	Taekwondo	Women's Taekwondo 67 kg	23 August	
Bronze	Yazid Gharbi	Wrestling	Men's Greco-Roman 60 kg	23 August	
Bronze	Abdelhaq Nadir	Boxing	Boxing at the 2026 Mediterranean Games – Men's welterweight 70 kg	26 August	
Bronze	Yasmine Mouttaki	Boxing	Boxing at the 2026 Mediterranean Games – Women's light flyweight 51 kg	26 August	
Bronze	Mounia Toutire	Boxing	Boxing at the 2026 Mediterranean Games – Women's welterweight 65 kg	26 August	
Bronze	Morocco U-20 football team	Football	Football at the 2026 Mediterranean Games – Men's tournament	27 August	
Bronze	Diae El Jardi; Younes Lalami	Tennis	Tennis at the 2026 Mediterranean Games - Mixed doubles	30 August	
Bronze	Morocco Equestrian Team	Equestrian	Equestrian at the 2026 Mediterranean Games	30 August	
Bronze	Yasmine Kabbaj	Tennis	Tennis at the 2026 Mediterranean Games - Women's singles	31 August	
Bronze	Morocco women's U-18 football team	Football	Football at the 2026 Mediterranean Games – Women's tournament	31 August	
Bronze	Souad Elhaddad	Athletics	Athletics at the 2026 Mediterranean Games Women's 800m	31 August	
Bronze	Kaoutar Farkoussi	Athletics	Athletics at the 2026 Mediterranean Games Women's 10000m	31 August	
Bronze	Said Oubaya	Karate	Karate at the 2026 Mediterranean Games – Men's 67 kg	1 September	
Bronze	Sawsane Benchbab	Karate	Karate at the 2026 Mediterranean Games – Women's 61 kg	1 September	
Bronze	Hamza Sam	Karate	Karate at the 2026 Mediterranean Games – Men's 75 kg	1 September	
Bronze	Anass Essayi	Athletics	Athletics at the 2026 Mediterranean Games Men's 1500m	31 August	
Bronze	Fouad Messaoudi	Athletics	Athletics at the 2026 Mediterranean Games women's 5000m	31 August	
Bronze	El Ghali Boukaa	Equestrian	Equestrian at the 2026 Mediterranean Games - Jumping individual	31 August	
Bronze	Hicham Ouladha	Athletics	Athletics at the 2026 Mediterranean Games Men's 10000m	2 September	
