= Carlo Alberto Caniato =

Italian tennis player (born 2005)

- Country (sports): Italy
- Residence: Forlì, Italy
- Born: 31 October 2005 (age 20) Verona, Italy
- Height: 1.88 m (6 ft 2 in)
- Turned pro: 2021
- Plays: Right-handed (two-handed backhand)
- Coach: Alberto Casadei; Omar Urbinati
- Prize money: US $120,291

Singles
- Career record: 0–0
- Career titles: 0
- Highest ranking: No. 302 (26 October 2026)
- Current ranking: No. 302 (26 October 2026)

Doubles
- Career record: 1–1
- Career titles: 0
- Highest ranking: No. 267 (22 September 2025)
- Current ranking: No. 627 (26 October 2026)
- Last updated on: 26 October 2026.

Carlo Alberto Caniato
Medal record

Men's tennis

Representing Italy

Mediterranean Games
Bronze medal – third place	2026 Taranto	Singles

Carlo Alberto Caniato (born 31 October 2005) is an Italian professional tennis player. He has a career-high ATP singles ranking of No. 302 achieved on 26 October 2026 and a doubles ranking of No. 267 achieved on 22 September 2025.

== Early life ==
Caniato was born in Verona, the second of four children of father Riccardo and mother Laura. His father, uncle, and grandfather were all tennis players; he himself began playing tennis at the age of four. He grew up in Ferrara, and in his youth trained at Tennis Club Marfisa and CUS Ferrara. At the age of 15, he moved to Forlì to train at the Accademia Villa Carpena.

== Junior career ==
In May 2022, Caniato won his first ITF Junior title at the Grade 5 Tennis Club de Kairouan event in Sousse, defeating Yessine Kerouat in the final. That July, he reached the semifinals of the Grade 4 Felbermayr Junior Open in Gunskirchen. He also reached the final of the Grade 4 Bavarian Junior Championships in Fürth as a qualifier, but lost to Keegan Rice. In August, he reached the final of the J4 Slovenian Junior Open in Domžale, but lost to compatriot Lorenzo Angelini.

In May 2023, he won the J200 Città di Prato International Tournament, defeating Nicolai Budkov Kjær in the final. In July, he qualified for his first Junior Grand Slam at Wimbledon, but lost to Rei Sakamoto in the first round of singles. Later that month, he and Gabriele Vulpitta reached the doubles final of the U18 European Junior Championships in Klosters. At the US Open in September, he reached the third round in singles before losing to Learner Tien.

== Professional career ==
In November 2024, Caniato and Fabio De Michele won the doubles title at the M15 event in San Gregorio di Catania, defeating compatriots Niccolò Catini and Giuseppe La Vela in the final.

In February 2025, he won back-to-back M15 doubles titles in Sharm El Sheikh, partnering Federico Bondioli. That May, after winning the pre-qualifying tournament, he and Bondioli received a wildcard into the doubles main draw of the Italian Open. In the first round, they upset the fifth-seeded team of Simone Bolelli and Andrea Vavassori.

In September 2026, he won the men's singles bronze medal at the Mediterranean Games. That month, he also won his first ATP Challenger Tour title at the Biella Challenger and reached the final of the De Wave Open Challenger.

== Performance timelines ==
Key
W	F	SF	QF	#R	RR	Q#	DNQ	A	NH

(W) winner; (F) finalist; (SF) semifinalist; (QF) quarterfinalist; (#R) rounds 4, 3, 2, 1; (RR) round-robin stage; (Q#) qualification round; (DNQ) did not qualify; (A) absent; (NH) not held; (SR) strike rate (events won / competed); (W–L) win–loss record.
To avoid confusion and double counting, these charts are updated at the conclusion of a tournament or when the player's participation has ended.

=== Doubles ===
Current through the 2025 Italian Open.

Tournament	2025	SR	W–L	Win%
ATP Masters 1000
Italian Open	2R	0 / 1	1–1	50%
Win–loss	1–1	0 / 1	1–1	50%

== ATP Challenger and ITF World Tennis Tour finals ==
=== Singles: 6 (3 titles, 3 runner-ups) ===
Legend ATP Challenger (1–1) ITF WTT (2–2)	Finals by surface Hard (1–0) Clay (2–3)

Result	W–L	Date	Tournament	Tier	Surface	Opponent	Score
Loss	0–1	Aug 2024	M15 Forlì, Italy	WTT	Clay	(Italy) Federico Iannaccone	3–6, 5–7
Loss	0–2	Jun 2025	M25 Cattolica, Italy	WTT	Clay	(Italy) Manuel Mazza	4–6, 4–6
Win	1–2	Jul 2025	M25+H Bacău, Romania	WTT	Clay	(Uruguay) Franco Roncadelli	6–3, 6–2
Win	2–2	Oct 2025	M25 Sintra, Portugal	WTT	Hard	(Belgium) Gilles-Arnaud Bailly	7–5, 6–2
Win	3–2	Sep 2026	Biella, Italy	Challenger	Clay	(Spain) Alejandro Moro Cañas	7–6^{(7–1)}, 6–4
Loss	3–3	Sep 2026	Genoa, Italy	Challenger	Clay	(Croatia) Luka Mikrut	4–6, 5–7

=== Doubles: 8 (4 titles, 4 runner-ups) ===
Legend
ITF WTT (4–4)

Result	W–L	Date	Tournament	Tier	Surface	Partner	Opponents	Score
Loss	0–1	Aug 2023	M15 Pescara, Italy	WTT	Clay	(Italy) Gabriele Vulpitta	(Italy) Andrea Picchione (Italy) Giorgio Ricca	7–6^{(7–3)}, 3–6, [8–10]
Loss	0–2	Jan 2024	M15 Sharm El Sheikh, Egypt	WTT	Hard	(Italy) Federico Bondioli	Erik Arutiunian; Pavel Verbin	6–3, 5–7, [5–10]
Loss	0–3	Jun 2024	M15 Bergamo, Italy	WTT	Clay	(Italy) Leonardo Malgaroli	(Italy) Niccolò Catini (Italy) Noah Perfetti	4–6, 6–3, [5–10]
Win	1–3	Nov 2024	M15 San Gregorio di Catania, Italy	WTT	Clay	(Italy) Fabio De Michele	(Italy) Niccolò Catini (Italy) Giuseppe La Vela	6–4, 6–7^{(3–7)}, [10–4]
Win	2–3	Feb 2025	M15 Sharm El Sheikh, Egypt	WTT	Hard	(Italy) Federico Bondioli	(Italy) Gregorio Biondolillo (Italy) Lorenzo Sciahbasi	7–5, 6–2
Win	3–3	Feb 2025	M15 Sharm El Sheikh, Egypt	WTT	Hard	(Italy) Federico Bondioli	Erik Arutiunian; Daniil Ostapenkov	4–6, 7–6^{(7–1)}, [10–4]
Loss	3–4	May 2025	M25 Cervia, Italy	WTT	Clay	(Italy) Federico Bondioli	(Italy) Francesco Forti (Germany) Daniel Masur	7–6^{(7–2)}, 3–6, [7–10]
Win	4–4	Jun 2025	M25 Cattolica, Italy	WTT	Clay	(Italy) Filippo Romano	(Italy) Niccolò Catini (Italy) Lorenzo Sciahbasi	6–2, 6–7^{(2–7)}, [10–8]
