= Younes Lalami =

Moroccan tennis player

- Full name: Younes Lalami Laaroussi
- Country (sports): Morocco
- Born: 18 April 2001 (age 25) Montreal, Quebec, Canada
- Height: 1.88 m (6 ft 2 in)
- Plays: Right-handed (two-handed backhand)
- College: Old Dominion
- Prize money: US $73,487

Singles
- Career record: 0–3
- Career titles: 0
- Highest ranking: No. 835 (18 May 2026)
- Current ranking: No. 1,072 (19 October 2026)

Doubles
- Career record: 3–7
- Career titles: 2 ITF
- Highest ranking: No. 172 (19 October 2026)
- Current ranking: No. 172 (19 October 2026)
- Last updated on: 19 October 2026.

Younes Lalami
Medal record

Men's tennis

Representing Morocco

Mediterranean Games
Gold medal – first place	2026 Taranto	Doubles
Bronze medal – third place	2026 Taranto	Mixed doubles

Younes Lalami Laaroussi (Arabic: يونس العلمي العروسي; born 18 April 2001) is a Moroccan professional tennis player. He has a career-high ATP doubles ranking of world No. 172 achieved on 19 October 2026 and a career-high singles ranking of No. 835 achieved on 18 May 2026.

Lalami plays mostly on the ITF Men's Tour. He represents Morocco in the Davis Cup since 2022, where he has a W/L record of 3–0.

== College ==
Lalami played college tennis at Old Dominion University.

== Career ==
Lalami made his ATP main draw debut at the 2023 Grand Prix Hassan II in Marrakesh, after he received a wildcard into the singles and doubles main draws. At the 2025 Grand Prix Hassan II Lalami received a wildcard for the doubles draw partnering with compatriot Taha Baadi. In March 2026, Lalami received a main draw wildcard to his home tournament in Marrakech in the doubles event. Playing alongside Polish Filip Pieczonka, the pair defeated top-seeds Hugo Nys and Édouard Roger-Vasselin to reach the quarterfinals, and following the withdrawal of Alexandre Muller and Mick Veldheer reached his first ATP semifinal in doubles. At the same tournament, Lalami also received a wildcard for the singles qualifying draw.

== Personal life ==
Lalami was born in Montreal, Canada but represents Morocco in tennis competitions through his Moroccan father. His sister Nadia is a former tennis player.
