= Gerard Campaña Lee =

South Korean tennis player

- Country (sports): South Korea
- Born: 1 October 2004 (age 22) Barcelona, Spain
- Height: 1.83 m (6 ft 0 in)
- Plays: Right-Handed, Two-Handed Backhand
- Prize money: US $114,177

Singles
- Career record: 0–1 (at ATP Tour level, Grand Slam level, and in Davis Cup)
- Career titles: 0
- Highest ranking: No. 318 (24 June 2024)
- Current ranking: No. 526 (14 September 2026)

Doubles
- Career record: 0–0 (at ATP Tour level, Grand Slam level, and in Davis Cup)
- Career titles: 0
- Highest ranking: No. 946 (22 June 2026)
- Current ranking: No. 1,693 (14 September 2026)
- Last updated on: 16 September 2026.

Gerard Campaña Lee (born 1 October 2004) is South Korean tennis player. He has a career high ATP singles ranking of world No. 318 achieved on 24 June 2024 and a doubles ranking of No. 946 achieved on 22 June 2026. He also achieved a junior ranking of No. 3 achieved on 12 December 2022.

He represents South Korea at the Davis Cup, where he has a win-loss record of 0–1.

== Career ==
=== 2022: Osaka Mayor Cup and Orange Bowl titles ===
Campaña Lee won the Osaka Mayor's Cup – Boy's singles in October and then the U18 Orange Bowl – Boy's singles two months later.

=== 2023: First ITF title ===
Campana Lee won his first ITF World Tour title in the M25 Anseong in his home country of South Korea, beating his fellow countryman San-hui Shin in straight sets to win the title. A month later, he reached the finals of M25 Kramsach, but lost against Kalin Ivanovski in straight sets.

== ATP Challenger and ITF World Tennis Tour finals ==
=== Singles: 3 (2–1) ===
Legend ATP Challenger Tour (0–0) ITF World Tennis Tour (2–1)	Finals by surface Hard (0–0) Clay (2–1) Grass (0–0) Carpet (0–0)

Result	W–L	Date	Tournament	Tier	Surface	Opponent	Score
Win	1–0	Jun 2023	M25 Anseong, South Korea	World Tour	Clay	(South Korea) San-hui Shin	7–5, 6–4
Loss	1–1	Jul 2023	M25 Kramsach, Austria	World Tour	Clay	(North Macedonia) Kalin Ivanovski	2–6, 2–6
Win	2–1	Sep 2026	M25 Sabadell, Spain	World Tour	Clay	(Netherlands) Sander Jong	6–3, 6–2
