= Alejo Sánchez Quílez =

Spanish tennis player (born 2005)

- Country (sports): Spain
- Born: 25 June 2005 (age 21) Calatayud, Spain
- Height: 1.80 m (5 ft 11 in)
- Plays: Right-handed (two-handed backhand)
- Prize money: US $113,411

Singles
- Career record: 0–0 (at ATP Tour level, Grand Slam level, and in Davis Cup)
- Career titles: 4 ITF
- Highest ranking: No. 319 (16 November 2026)
- Current ranking: No. 319 (16 November 2026)

Doubles
- Career record: 0–0 (at ATP Tour level, Grand Slam level, and in Davis Cup)
- Career titles: 2 Challenger, 3 ITF
- Highest ranking: No. 314 (19 October 2026)
- Current ranking: No. 317 (16 November 2026)
Medal record
Men's tennis
Representing Spain
Mediterranean Games
Silver medal – second place	2026 Taranto	Singles
Silver medal – second place	2026 Taranto	Doubles
Silver medal – second place	2026 Taranto	Mixed doubles
- Last updated on: 16 November 2026.

Alejo Sánchez Quílez (born 25 June 2005) is a Spanish tennis player. Sánchez Quílez has a career high ATP singles ranking of No. 319 achieved on 16 November 2026 and a career high ATP doubles ranking of No. 314 achieved on 19 October 2026.

Sánchez Quílez has won two ATP Challenger doubles title at the 2026 Open de Tenis Ciudad de Pozoblanco.
