= Filippo Romano =

Italian tennis player (born 2005)

- Country (sports): Italy
- Born: 7 July 2005 (age 21) Sarzana, Italy
- Height: 1.88 m (6 ft 2 in)
- Plays: Right-handed (two-handed backhand)
- Coach: Gipo Arbino, Federico Maccari
- Prize money: US $172,651

Singles
- Career record: 0–0 (at ATP Tour level, Grand Slam level, and in Davis Cup)
- Career titles: 0
- Highest ranking: No. 240 (2 November 2026)
- Current ranking: No. 240 (2 November 2026)

Doubles
- Career record: 0–2 (at ATP Tour level, Grand Slam level, and in Davis Cup)
- Career titles: 0; 2 Challenger
- Highest ranking: No. 164 (28 September 2026)
- Current ranking: No. 165 (2 November 2026)
- Last updated on: 2 November 2026.

Filippo Romano
Medal record

Men's tennis

Representing Italy

Mediterranean Games
Gold medal – first place	2026 Taranto	Mixed doubles

Filippo Romano (born 7 July 2005) is an Italian professional tennis player. He has a career-high ATP singles ranking of No. 240 achieved on 2 November 2026 and a career-high doubles ranking of No. 164 achieved on 28 September 2026.

Romano plays mostly on the ATP Challenger Tour, where he has won two titles in doubles.

== Career ==
Romano made his ATP main draw debut at the 2025 Italian Open, receiving a wildcard into the doubles main draw with Mattia Bellucci.

He qualified for the main draw and reached the quarterfinals at the 2026 Birmingham Open. He also qualified for the 2026 Ilkley Open.

== ATP Challenger Tour finals ==
=== Singles: 2 (1 title, 1 runner-up) ===
Legend ATP Challenger Tour (1–1)

Result	W–L	Date	Tournament	Tier	Surface	Opponent	Score
Loss	0–1	Mar 2026	Challenger La Manche, France	Challenger	Hard (i)	Pavel Kotov	2–6, 5–7
Win	1–1	Oct 2026	Florence Challenger, Italy	Challenger	Clay	(Italy) Michele Ribecai	6–3, 4–6, 6–2

=== Doubles: 8 (5 titles, 3 runner-ups) ===
Legend ATP Challenger Tour (5–3)	Finals by surface Hard (0–1) Clay (5–2)

Result	W–L	Date	Tournament	Tier	Surface	Partner	Opponents	Score
Loss	0–1	Sep 2024	Izida Cup II, Bulgaria	Challenger	Clay	(Italy) Francesco Maestrelli	(Canada) Liam Draxl (Canada) Cleeve Harper	1–6, 6–3, [10–12]
Loss	0–2	Apr 2025	Atkinsons Monza Open, Italy	Challenger	Clay	(Italy) Jacopo Vasamì	(Netherlands) Sander Arends (United Kingdom) Luke Johnson	1–6, 1–6
Win	1–2	Aug 2025	Internazionali Città di Todi, Italy	Challenger	Clay	(Italy) Jacopo Vasamì	(Israel) Daniel Cukierman (Denmark) Johannes Ingildsen	6–4, 6–3
Win	2–2	Sep 2025	Città di Biella Challenger, Italy	Challenger	Clay	(Italy) Gianluca Cadenasso	(Belgium) Buvaysar Gadamauri (Netherlands) Jelle Sels	6–3, 7–5
Loss	2–3	Feb 2026	Trofeo Città di Cesenatico, Italy	Challenger	Hard (i)	(Italy) Francesco Forti	(Netherlands) Jarno Jans (Netherlands) Niels Visker	6–7^{(7–9)}, 3–6
Win	3–3	May 2026	Challenger Città di Cervia, Italy	Challenger	Clay	(Italy) Francesco Forti	(Argentina) Santiago Rodríguez Taverna (Spain) David Vega Hernández	6–3, 6–4
Win	4–3	Jun 2026	Aspria Tennis Cup, Italy	Challenger	Clay	(Italy) Francesco Forti	(India) Siddhant Banthia (India) Arjun Kadhe	6–3, 7–6^{(7–5)}
Win	5–3	Sep 2026	Città di Biella, Italy	Challenger	Clay	(Italy) Francesco Forti	(Italy) Franco Agamenone (Argentina) Máximo Zeitune	4–6, 7–5, [10–8]

== ITF World Tennis Tour finals ==
=== Singles: 3 (1 title, 2 runner-up) ===
Legend ITF WTT (1–2)

Result	W–L	Date	Tournament	Tier	Surface	Opponent	Score
Win	1–0	Jan 2025	M15 Bagnoles-de-l'Orne, France	WTT	Clay (i)	(France) Lucas Bouquet	7–6^{(8–6)}, 6–0
Loss	1–1	May 2025	M25 Cervia, Italy	WTT	Clay	(Italy) Jacopo Berrettini	6–7^{(2–7)}, 2–6
Loss	1–2	Oct 2025	M15 Sëlva Gardena, Italy	WTT	Hard (i)	(Austria) Sandro Kopp	4–6, 6–7^{(4–7)}

=== Doubles: 22 (18 titles, 4 runner-ups) ===
Legend ITF WTT (18–4)	Finals by surface Hard (8–1) Clay (9–3) Carpet (1–0)

Result	W–L	Date	Tournament	Tier	Surface	Partner	Opponents	Score
Win	1–0	Aug 2022	M25 Bolzano, Italy	WTT	Clay	(Italy) Francesco Forti	(Italy) Federico Bertuccioli (Italy) Andrea Picchione	7–6^{(7–4)}, 6–3
Loss	1–1	Aug 2022	M25 Lesa, Italy	WTT	Clay	(Italy) Federico Bondioli	(Denmark) Johannes Ingildsen (Denmark) August Holmgren	1–6, 4–6
Win	2–1	Oct 2023	M15 Villers-lès-Nancy, France	WTT	Hard (i)	(Sweden) Max Dahlin	(Germany) Patrick Zahraj (Germany) Jannik Opitz	6–2, 6–2
Win	3–1	Oct 2023	M25 Heraklion, Greece	WTT	Hard	(Italy) Francesco Forti	(Netherlands) Guy den Heijer (Netherlands) Dax Donders	4–6, 7–6^{(7–1)}, [10–4]
Win	4–1	Jan 2024	M15 Bagnoles-de-l'Orne, France	WTT	Clay (i)	(Italy) Leonardo Taddia	(United Kingdom) James Markiewicz (United Kingdom) Michael Shaw	7–6^{(7–4)}, 6–3
Win	5–1	Feb 2024	M15 Lannion, France	WTT	Hard (i)	(Italy) Federico Bondioli	(France) Yanis Ghazouani Durand (France) Loann Massard	6–4, 4–6, [11–9]
Win	6–1	Apr 2024	M15 Azay-le-Rideau, France	WTT	Hard (i)	(Australia) Mitchell Harper	(France) Axel Garcian (France) Arthur Nagel	2–6, 6–4, [10–7]
Loss	6–2	Apr 2024	M25 Angers, France	WTT	Clay (i)	(France) Arthur Nagel	(France) Dan Added (France) Constantin Bittoun Kouzmine	4–6, 7–5, [9–11]
Win	7–2	Apr 2024	M15 Osijek, Croatia	WTT	Clay	(Germany) Kai Lemstra	(Germany) Dominique Graf (Czech Republic) Daniel Pátý	7–6^{(7–3)}, 7–5
Win	8–2	May 2024	M15 Celje, Slovenia	WTT	Clay	(Germany) Kai Wehnelt	(Czech Republic) Jiří Barnat (Czech Republic) Jan Hrazdil	4–6, 6–4, [10–4]
Win	9–2	Oct 2024	M25 Trnava, Slovakia	WTT	Hard (i)	(Switzerland) Rémy Bertola	(Slovakia) Miloš Karol (Ukraine) Vitaliy Sachko	6–3, 6–3
Win	10–2	Jan 2025	M15 Bagnoles-de-l'Orne, France	WTT	Clay (i)	(Italy) Leonardo Taddia	(France) Axel Garcian (France) Arthur Nagel	6–4, 6–4
Win	11–2	Feb 2025	M15 Bucharest, Romania	WTT	Hard (i)	(Germany) Kai Wehnelt	(United Kingdom) Emile Hudd (United Kingdom) Hamish Stewart	6–4, 6–4
Win	12–2	Mar 2025	M15 Rovinj, Croatia	WTT	Clay	(Italy) Edoardo Zanada	(Czech Republic) Matyáš Černý (Czech Republic) Jonáš Kučera	6–3, 6–1
Win	13–2	Mar 2025	M15 Foggia, Italy	WTT	Clay	(Italy) Jacopo Vasamì	(Italy) Alessio De Bernardis (Italy) Manuel Plunger	6–1, 6–4
Win	14–2	Jun 2025	M25 Česká Lípa, Czech Republic	WTT	Clay	(Ukraine) Vladyslav Orlov	(Czech Republic) David Poljak (Czech Republic) Jan Kumstát	7–6^{(7–4)}, 6–1
Win	15–2	Jun 2025	M25 Cattolica, Italy	WTT	Clay	(Italy) Carlo Alberto Caniato	(Italy) Niccolò Catini (Italy) Lorenzo Sciahbasi	6–2, 6–7^{(2–7)}, [10–8]
Loss	15–3	Sep 2025	M25 Santa Margherita di Pula, Italy	WTT	Clay	(Italy) Alexander Weis	(Italy) Federico Iannaccone (Italy) Giorgio Tabacco	walkover
Win	16–3	Oct 2025	M25 Sarreguemines, France	WTT	Carpet (i)	(France) Arthur Nagel	(United Kingdom) Liam Hignett (United Kingdom) Ben Jones	6–4, 6–4
Win	17–3	Oct 2025	M15 Sëlva Gardena, Italy	WTT	Hard (i)	(Italy) Gabriele Volpi	(Germany) Calvin Müller (Germany) Niklas Schell	6–2, 6–4
Loss	17–4	Nov 2025	M25 Heraklion, Greece	WTT	Hard	(Italy) Gabriele Volpi	(United States) Keshav Chopra (Italy) Giulio Perego	6–4, 1–6, [8–10]
Win	18–4	Feb 2026	M25 Trento, Italy	WTT	Hard (i)	(Italy) Francesco Forti	(United Kingdom) Tom Hands (United Kingdom) Harry Wendelken	6–3, 6–3
