= Spain at the 2026 Mediterranean Games =

- IOC code: ESP
- NOC: Spanish Olympic Committee
- Competitors: 229 in 28 sports
- Flag bearers: TBD; TBD (opening)
- Medals Ranked 6th: Gold 18 Silver 35 Bronze 28 Total 81

Mediterranean Games appearances (overview)
- 1951; 1955; 1959; 1963; 1967; 1971; 1975; 1979; 1983; 1987; 1991; 1993; 1997; 2001; 2005; 2009; 2013; 2018; 2022; 2026

Spain will compete at the 2026 Mediterranean Games in Taranto, Italy from 20 August to 3 September.

== Medal table ==
Medal	Name	Sport	Event	Date
Gold	Lucía Martín-Portugués	Fencing	Women's sabre	22 August
Gold	Isabel Contreras; Miriam Vega	Canoeing	Women's K-2 500 m	23 August
Gold	Ainhoa Campabadal	Swimming	Women's 200 m freestyle	23 August
Gold	Alba Valiente	Boules	Women's petanque precision	24 August
Gold	Andrés García	Shooting	Men's trap	26 August
Gold	Laura Fuertes	Boxing	Women's -51 kg	27 August
Gold	Enmanuel Reyes	Boxing	Men's -90 kg	27 August
Gold	Rafael Lozano Jr.	Boxing	Men's -55 kg	27 August
Gold	Pablo Coy	Boxing	Men's -80 kg	27 August
Gold	Diego Conde; Yun Sánchez; Andrés Temiño	Archery	Men's team	28 August
Gold	Lucía Sainz; Patty Llaguno	Padel	Women's pairs	28 August
Gold	David Gala; José Antonio Diestro	Padel	Men's pairs	28 August
Gold	Alba Sánchez	Weightlifting	Women's -53 kg clean & jerk	31 August
Gold	Tayra Eke; Marta Morales; Elena Moreno; Elena Rodríguez	3x3 basketball	Women's tournament	1 September
Gold	Jordi Boix; Juan García-Abril; Darío López; Rubén Salas	3x3 basketball	Men's tournament	1 September
Gold	Carlos Bosch	Equestrian	Individual jumping	1 September
Gold	Ignacio Yockers	Artistic gymnastics	Men's pommel horse	2 September
Gold	Marcos Ruiz	Weightlifting	Men's - 110 kg snatch	2 September
Silver	Sandra Alonso	Cycling	Women's time trial	22 August
Silver	Daniela Pinyol	Fencing	Women's epeé	23 August
Silver	Manel Luque	Boules	Men's petanque precision	24 August
Silver	Alba Valiente; Celia Abril	Boules	Women's petanque doubles	25 August
Silver	Carla Jaume	Wrestling	Women's freestyle 53 kg	25 August
Silver	Lydia Pérez	Wrestling	Women's freestyle 57 kg	25 August
Silver	Cristobal Vargas	Swimming	Men's 1500 m freestyle	25 August
Silver	Manel Luque; Sergi Ruíz	Boules	Men's petanque doubles	25 August
Silver	Cristina Soler	Boules	Women's lyonnaise precision	25 August
Silver	Daniela Picó	Rhythmic gymnastics	Individual all-around	26 August
Silver	Ewart Martín	Boxing	Men's -60 kg	27 August
Silver	Frank Martínez	Boxing	Men's -70 kg	27 August
Silver	Andrés García; Mar Molné	Shooting	Mixed trap team	26 August
Silver	Elia Canales	Archery	Women's individual	28 August
Silver	Luis Barroso	Judo	Men's -60 kg	28 August
Silver	Adrián Alonso	Roller speed skating	Men's marathon	28 August
Silver	Nuria Rodríguez; Jimena Velasco	Padel	Women's pairs	28 August
Silver	Leyre Escauriaza; Marina Escudero; Erika Guindell; Aitana Pacheco; Alba Petisco; Carlota Armenta	Artistic gymnastics	Women's team all-around	30 August
Silver	Alejo Sánchez Quílez; Àlex Martí	Tennis	Men's doubles	30 August
Silver	Lucía Cortéz; Alejo Sánchez Quílez	Tennis	Mixed doubles	30 August
Silver	Carlos Bosch; Pello Elorduy; Álvaro González de Zárate; Bautista Rodríguez	Equestrian	Team jumping	30 August
Silver	María Olalla	Weightlifting	Women's -61 kg clean & jerk	31 August
Silver	Lorea Ibarzabal	Athletics	Women's 800 m	31 August
Silver	David Barroso	Athletics	Men's 800 m	31 August
Silver	Diego Casas	Athletics	Men's discus throw	31 August
Silver	Carmen Rosales	Athletics	Women's long jump	31 August
Silver	Eduardo Blanco; Natalia Castro; Jarno Pousada; Alejandra Seguí	Triathlon	Mixed relay	31 August
Silver	Alejo Sánchez Quílez	Tennis	Men's individual	31 August
Silver	Alba Petisco	Artistic gymnastics	Women's individual all-around	1 September
Silver	Nicolau Mir	Artistic gymnastics	Men's individual all-around	1 September
Silver	Yulemnis Aguilar	Athletics	Women's javelin throw	1 September
Silver	Marcos Ruiz	Weightlifting	Men's - 110 kg clean & jerk	2 September
Silver	Laura Redondo	Athletics	Women's Hammer Throw	2 September
Silver	Alba Petisco	Artistic gymnastics	Women's balance beam	2 September
Silver	Alba Petisco	Artistic gymnastics	Women's floor	2 September
Bronze	Santiago Madrigal	Fencing	Men's sabre	22 August
Bronze	Araceli Navarro	Fencing	Women's sabre	22 August
Bronze	Jesús Fraile	Taekwondo	Men's 58 kg	22 August
Bronze	Joaquín Pardo	Swimming	Men's 100 m backstroke	22 August
Bronze	Valeria Oliveira	Canoeing	Women's C-1 200 m	23 August
Bronze	Tamara Frías	Swimming	Women's 50 m backstroke	23 August
Bronze	Iván García	Taekwondo	Men's +80 kg	23 August
Bronze	Ane Vallo	Taekwondo	Women's +67 kg	23 August
Bronze	Ariadna Tucker	Fencing	Women's foil	24 August
Bronze	Paula González	Swimming	Women's 400 m medley	24 August
Bronze	Mohammad Mottaghinia	Wrestling	Men's freestyle 74 kg	24 August
Bronze	Ainhoa Campabadal	Swimming	Women's 100 m freestyle	24 August
Bronze	Paula González	Swimming	Women's 200 m butterfly	25 August
Bronze	Pablo Abián	Badminton	Men's singles	26 August
Bronze	Miguel Trotsenko	Finswimming	Men's 50 m bi-fins	27 August
Bronze	Paula Álvarez; Elia Canales; Leyre Fernández	Archery	Women's team	28 August
Bronze	Elia Canales; Andrés Temiño	Archery	Mixed team	28 August
Bronze	Nikol Carulla; Carmen María Jiménez	Badminton	Women's double	28 August
Bronze	Paula Álvarez	Archery	Women's individual	28 August
Bronze	Andrés Temiño	Archery	Men's individual	28 August
Bronze	Mireia Rodríguez	Judo	Women's -48 kg	28 August
Bronze	Daniel Berzosa; Juan Pérez	Table tennis	Men's team	28 August
Bronze	Daniel Nieto	Judo	Men's -90 kg	29 August
Bronze	Eduardo Blanco	Triathlon	Men's individual race	29 August
Bronze	María Olalla	Weightlifting	Women's -61 kg snatch	31 August
Bronze	Daniel Carrión; Thierno Diallo; Sergio Kovacks; Nicolau Mir; Ignacio Yockers	Artistic gymnastics	Men's team all-around	31 August
Bronze	Mikel Mardaras	Rowing	Men's single skull	1 September
Bronze	Luis Cabarcos	Skateboarding	Men's street	2 September

== Medal by sport ==
Medals by sport
Sport	1st place, gold medalist(s)	2nd place, silver medalist(s)	3rd place, bronze medalist(s)	Total	Rank
3x3 basketball	2	0	0	2	1st
Archery	1	1	4	6	2nd
Artistic gymnastics	1	5	1	7	5th
Athletics	0	6	0	6	13th
Badminton	0	0	2	2	6th
Boules	1	4	0	5	4th
Boxing	4	2	0	6	1st
Canoeing	1	0	1	2	4th
Cycling	0	1	0	1	4th
Equestrian	1	1	0	2	1st
Fencing	1	1	3	5	3rd
Finswimming	0	0	1	1	8th
Judo	0	1	2	3	14th
Padel	2	1	0	3	1st
Rhythmic gymnastics	0	1	0	1	2nd
Roller speed skating	0	1	0	1	4th
Rowing	0	0	1	1	8th
Shooting	1	1	0	2	4th
Skateboarding	0	0	1	1	3rd
Swimming	1	1	5	7	7th
Table tennis	0	0	1	1	7th
Taekwondo	0	0	3	3	7th
Tennis	0	3	0	3	4th
Triathlon	0	1	1	2	3rd
Weightlifting	2	2	1	5	4th
Wrestling	0	2	1	3	11th

== 3x3 basketball ==
Athlete	Event	Group matches				Quarterfinals	Semifinals	Final / BM	
Athlete	Event	Opposition Score	Opposition Score	Opposition Score	Rank	Opposition Score	Opposition Score	Opposition Score	Rank
Jordi Boix; Juan García-Abril; Darío López; Rubén Salas	Men's Tournament	(Bosnia and Herzegovina) Bosnia & Herzegovina; W 21-11	(Italy) Italy; L 19–20	(Tunisia) Tunisia; L 18–15	2 Q	(France) France; W 21-15	(Turkey) Turkey; W 21-15	(Italy) Italy; W 20-18	1st place, gold medalist(s)
Tayra Eke; Marta Morales; Elena Moreno; Elena Rodríguez	Women's Tournament	(Egypt) Egypt; W 21-4	(Portugal) Portugal; W 21-19	—N/a	1 Q	(Greece) Greece; W 20-8	(Cyprus) Cyprus; W 19-12	(Italy) Italy; W 13-11	1st place, gold medalist(s)

== Archery ==
Men

Athlete	Event	Ranking round		Round of 64	Round of 32	Round of 16	Quarterfinals	Semifinals	Final / BM	
Athlete	Event	Score	Seed	Opposition Score	Opposition Score	Opposition Score	Opposition Score	Opposition Score	Opposition Score	Rank
Diego Conde	Individual	636	11 Q	Bye	Zavasnik (SLO); W 6-0	Stefanovic (SRB); W 6-2	Borsani (ITA); W 7-3	Gregori (ITA); L 2-6	Temiño (ESP); L 1-7	4
Yun Sánchez	Individual	641	9 Q	Bye	Bakri (ALG); W 6-0	Tümer (TUR); W 6-2	Temiño (ESP); L 1-7	Did not advanced		
Andrés Temiño	Individual	664	1 Q	Bye	Dvorani (KOS); W 6-0	Remar (CRO); W 6-0	Sánchez (ESP); W 7-1	Chirault (FRA); L 3-7	Conde (ESP); W 7-1	3rd place, bronze medalist(s)
Diego Conde; Yun Sánchez; Andrés Temiño	Team	1941	2 Q	—N/a		Bye	Kosovo (KOS); W 6-2	Turkey (TUR); W 5-3	France (FRA); W 6-0	1st place, gold medalist(s)

Women

Athlete	Event	Ranking round		Round of 32	Round of 16	Quarterfinals	Semifinals	Final / BM	
Athlete	Event	Score	Seed	Opposition Score	Opposition Score	Opposition Score	Opposition Score	Opposition Score	Rank
Paula Álvarez	Individual	648	6 Q	Hachani (ALG); W 6-0	Andreoli (ITA); W 6-4	Yenihayat (TUR); W 6-5	Canales (ESP); L 2-6	Gökkır (TUR); W 6-2	3rd place, bronze medalist(s)
Elia Canales	Individual	658	2 Q	Bye	Brkic (SRB); W 6-0	Rebagliati (ITA); W 6-2	Álvarez (ESP); W 6-2	Barbelin (FRA); L 3-7	2nd place, silver medalist(s)
Leyre Fernández	Individual	634	9 Q	Argyridou (CYP); W 6-0	Barbelin (FRA); L 0-6	Did not advanced			
Paula Álvarez; Elia Canales; Leyre Fernández	Team	1940	1 Q	—N/a		Bye	France (FRA); L 2-6	Italy (ITA); W 5-1	3rd place, bronze medalist(s)

Mixed

Athlete	Event	Ranking round		Round of 16	Quarterfinals	Semifinals	Final / BM	
Athlete	Event	Score	Seed	Opposition Score	Opposition Score	Opposition Score	Opposition Score	Rank
Andrés Temiño; Elia Canales	Mixed team	1322	1 Q	Bye	Cyprus (CYP); W 5-1	France (FRA); L 4-5	Italy (ITA); W 5-3	3rd place, bronze medalist(s)

== Artistic gymnastics ==
Men
Team

Key:

- F - Floor
- PH - Pommel horse
- R - Rings
- V - Vault
- PB - Parallel bars
- HB - Horizontal bar

Athlete	Event	Final							
Athlete	Event	Apparatus						Total	Rank
Athlete	Event	F	PH	R	V	PB	HB	Total	Rank
Daniel Carrión Caro	Team	12.900	10.600	12.850	13.350	12.900	12.150		
Thierno Diallo	Team	12.600	13.100	12.300	11.950	13.350	11.650		
Sergio Kovacs	Team	11.700		12.750	13.350				
Nicolau Mir	Team	13.450	12.900	12.750	13.150	13.850	11.800		
Ignacio Yockers	Team		14.200			12.050	13.000		
Total	Team	38.950	40.200	38.350	39.850	40.100	36.950	234.400	3rd place, bronze medalist(s)

Individual finals

Athlete	Event	Apparatus						Total	Rank
Athlete	Event	F	PH	R	V	PB	HB	Total	Rank
Thierno Diallo	All around	12.500	11.600	12.500	13.300	11.600	12.350	73.850	12
Nicolau Mir	All around	13.600	12.500	12.800	13.600	13.700	13.150	79.350	2nd place, silver medalist(s)
Nicolau Mir	Floor	13.400	—N/a						5
Nicolau Mir	Parallel bars	—N/a				12.850	—N/a		7
Ignacio Yockers	Pommel horse	—N/a	14.250	—N/a					1st place, gold medalist(s)
Sergio Kovacs	Vault	—N/a			13.000	—N/a			6

Women
Team

Key:

- F - Floor
- V - Vault
- UB - Uneven bars
- BB - Balance beam

Athlete	Event	Final					
Athlete	Event	Apparatus				Total	Rank
Athlete	Event	F	V	UB	BB	Total	Rank
Leire Escauriaza	Team	13.250			12.500		
Marina Escudero	Team	13.750	11.650	11.700	12.900		
Erika Guindel	Team		12.600	10.350			
Aitana Pacheco	Team	13.300	12.750	12.800	12.700		
Alba Petisco	Team	13.700	13.700	13.200	12.800		
Carlota Armenta	Team	—N/a					
Total	Team	40.750	39.050	37.700	38.400	155.900	2nd place, silver medalist(s)

Individual finals

Athlete	Event	Apparatus				Total	Rank
Athlete	Event	V	UB	BB	F	Total	Rank
Aitana Pacheco	All around	12.900	12.950	11.950	13.150	50.950	6
Aitana Pacheco	Vault	13.250	—N/a				4
Aitana Pacheco	Uneven bars	—N/a	12.250	—N/a			7
Aitana Pacheco	Balance beam	—N/a		11.800	—N/a		7
Alba Petisco	All around	13.650	12.500	13.450	13.250	52.850	2nd place, silver medalist(s)
Alba Petisco	Uneven bars	—N/a	13.550	—N/a			4
Alba Petisco	Balance beam	—N/a		13.200	—N/a		2nd place, silver medalist(s)
Alba Petisco	Floor	—N/a			13.200	—N/a	2nd place, silver medalist(s)
Marina Escudero	Vault	13.075	—N/a				6
Marina Escudero	Floor	—N/a			12.700	—N/a	4

== Athletics ==
Key

- Note – Ranks given for track events are within the athlete's heat only
- Q = Qualified for the next round
- q = Qualified for the next round as a fastest loser or, in field events, by position without achieving the qualifying target
- NR = National record
- N/A = Round not applicable for the event
- Bye = Athlete not required to compete in round

Men
Track & road events

Athlete	Event	Semifinal		Final	
Athlete	Event	Result	Rank	Result	Rank
Andoni Calbano	200 m	20.64	1 Q	20.58	4
Jorge García	400 m	DQ			
David Barroso	800 m	1:46.59	1 Q	1:46.35	2nd place, silver medalist(s)
Pablo Alba	10000 m	—N/a		31:48.78	10
Miguel Baidal	10000 m	—N/a		29:19.31	4
Hugo Chapado	110 m hurdles	14.00	2 Q	13.53	5
Gonzalo Sabin Lamborena	110 m hurdles	14.33	4 q	13.90	8

Field events

Athlete	Event	Qualification		Final	
Athlete	Event	Result	Rank	Result	Rank
Artur Coll	Pole vault	—N/a		5.15	6
Carlos Beltrán	Long jump	—N/a		7.66	8
Diego Casas	Discus throw	—N/a		65.62	2nd place, silver medalist(s)
Manu Quijera	Javelin throw	—N/a		74.61	5

Women
Track & road events

Athlete	Event	Semifinal		Final	
Athlete	Event	Result	Rank	Result	Rank
Alba Borrero	200 m	23.27	1 Q	23.26	4
Ana Prieto	400 m	52.24	3 Q	51.50	4
Lorea Ibarzabal	800 m	—N/a		2:00.07	2nd place, silver medalist(s)
Marta García	1500 m	—N/a		4:10.87	4
Paula Blanquer	110 m hurdles	13.58	3 Q	13.16	4
Lerato Pagés	110 m hurdles	13.54	1 Q	13.19	5

Field events

Athlete	Event	Qualification		Final	
Athlete	Event	Result	Rank	Result	Rank
Una Stancev	High jump	—N/a		1.87	5
Carmen Rosales	Long jump	—N/a		6.50	2nd place, silver medalist(s)
Mónica Clemente	Pole Vault	—N/a		4.35	6
Laura Redondo	Hammer throw	—N/a		67.82	2nd place, silver medalist(s)
Andrea Sales	Hammer throw	—N/a		64.92	7
Yulemnis Aguilar	Javelin throw	—N/a		65.39	2nd place, silver medalist(s)

== Badminton ==
Athlete	Event	Round of 32	Round of 16	Quarter-final	Semi-final	Final	
Athlete	Event	Opposition Score	Opposition Score	Opposition Score	Opposition Score	Opposition Score	Rank
Pablo Abian	Men's singles	Bye	Pejoski (MKD); W 2-0 (21-10, 21-2)	Yasar (TUR); W 0-2 (22-24, 14-21)	Caponio (ITA); L 0-2 (14-21, 18-21)	Did not advanced	3rd place, bronze medalist(s)
Daniel Franco; Rodrigo Sanjurjo	Men's double	—N/a	Toti / Caponio (ITA); W 0-2 (17-21, 14-21)	Gardon / Lalot-Trescarte (FRA); L 1-2 (21-17, 19-21, 21-19)	Did not advanced		
Cristina Teruel	Women's singles	Bye	Sotiriou (GRE); L 1-2 (17-21, 21-16, 13-21)	Did not advanced			
Nikol Carulla; Carmen María Jiménez	Women's double	—N/a	Bye	Blazina / Korent (SLO); W 0-2 (15-21, 7-21)	Cuevas / Jacob (FRA); L 0-2 (20-22, 12-21)	Did not advanced	3rd place, bronze medalist(s)
Rodrigo Sanjurjo; Nikol Carulla	Mixed double	Bye	Charalambous / Kattirtzi (CYP); W 2-0 (21-7, 21-8)	Begga / Elsa (FRA); L 1-2 (14-21, 21-16, 14-21)	Did not advance		

== Boules ==
Lyonnaise

Athlete	Event	Heats				Semifinals	Final / BM	
Athlete	Event	Heat 1	Heat 2	Total	Rank	Opposition Score	Opposition Score	Rank
Josep Alapont	Men's precision throw	6	6	12	10	Did not advance		
Cristina Soler	Women's precision throw	8	12	20	4 Q	Barazzutti (FRA); W 18-15	Ozbić (SLO); L 0-4	2nd place, silver medalist(s)

Pétanque

Athlete	Event	Preliminary round				Semifinals	Final / BM	
Athlete	Event	Round 1	Rank	Round 2	Rank	Opposition Score	Opposition Score	Rank
Manel Luque	Men's precision throw	39	2 Q	—N/a		Cousin (FRA); W 50-43	Rizzi (ITA); L 30-44	2nd place, silver medalist(s)
Alba Valiente	Women's precision throw	31	1 Q	—N/a		Ferrara (ITA); W 24-19	Peyre (FRA); W 32-30	1st place, gold medalist(s)

Athlete	Event	Group stage				Semifinals	Final / BM	
Athlete	Event	Opposition Score	Opposition Score	Opposition Score	Rank	Opposition Score	Opposition Score	Rank
Manel Luque; Sergi Ruiz	Men's doubles	Turkey (TUR); W 10-3	Algeria (ALG); W 7-6	Italy (ITA); L 2-4	2	Tunisia (TUN); W 13-3	Italy (ITA); L 4-9	2nd place, silver medalist(s)
Celia Abril; Alba Valiente	Women's doubles	Algeria (ALG); W 13-7	Tunisia (TUN); W 13-5	France (FRA); L 6-7	2	Tunisia (TUN); W 8-6	France (FRA); L 9-13	2nd place, silver medalist(s)

== Boxing ==
Men

Athlete	Event	Round of 16	Quarterfinals	Semifinals	Final	
Athlete	Event	Opposition Result	Opposition Result	Opposition Result	Opposition Result	Rank
Rafael Lozano Jr.	55 kg	Bye	Sciacca (ITA); W 4-1	Zanaz (ALG); W 4-1	Hippocrate (FRA); W 3-2	1st place, gold medalist(s)
Ewart Andrés Marín	60 kg	Đinović (MNE); W 0-5	Pleas (GRE); W 0-5	Rustemovski (MKD); W 4-1	Çınar (TUR); L 0-5	2nd place, silver medalist(s)
Oier Ibarretxe	65 kg	Bye	Grau (FRA); L 0-5	Did not advanced		
Frank Martínez	70 kg	Shpetim (KOS); W 0-5	Yaïche (ALG); W 0-5	Djemmal (FRA); W WO	Rontani (ITA); L 0-3	2nd place, silver medalist(s)
Pablo Coy	80 kg	Jakupi (KOS); W 0-5 RSC	Aybuga (TUR); W 5-0	Sarsilli (ITA); W 4-1	Abdou (ALG); W 4-1	1st place, gold medalist(s)
Enmanuel Reyes	90 kg	—N/a	Kostovski (MKD); W 0-5	Bouafia (FRA); W WO	Pizurica (SRB); W 0-5	1st place, gold medalist(s)

Women

Athlete	Event	Quarterfinals	Semifinals	Final	
Athlete	Event	Opposition Result	Opposition Result	Opposition Result	Rank
Laura Fuertes	51 kg	Soğuksu (TUR); W 4-1	Mouttaki (MAR); W 5-0	Mansouri (ALG); W 4-1	1st place, gold medalist(s)
Marta López Del Arbol	54 kg	Ćirković (SRB); L 2-3	Did not advanced		
Mariana Soto	65 kg	Çalışkan (TUR); L ADB	Did not advanced		
Dunia Martínez	70 kg	Richol (FRA); L 5-0	Did not advanced		

== Canoeing ==
Athlete	Event	Heats		Semifinals		Final	
Athlete	Event	Time	Rank	Time	Rank	Time	Rank
Pedro Torrado	Men's C-1 1000 m	—N/a				4:31.610	4
Marcos Caballero	Men's K-1 1000 m	3:51.44	3 QS	3:55.84	2 FA	3:55.87	7
Oscar Allegre; Manuel Rivas	Men's K-2 500 m	1:35.75	3 FA	—N/a		1:31.08	4
Valeria Oliveira	Women's C-1 200 m	—N/a				49.01	3rd place, bronze medalist(s)
Cristina Franco	Women's K-1 500 m	2:01.02	2 FA	—N/a		2:03.06	5
Isabel Contreras; Miriam Vega	Women's K-2 500 m	—N/a				1:46.63	1st place, gold medalist(s)

Qualification Legend:QS= Qualify to Semifinals FA = Qualify to final (medal); FB = Qualify to final B (non-medal)

== Cycling ==
Men

Athlete	Event	Time	Rank
Estanislao Calabuig	Road race	3:03:42	17
Estanislao Calabuig	Time trial	22:07.37	15
José María García	Road race	3:01:26	6
José María García	Time trial	21:05.80	8
Marco Martín	Men's road race	DNF	—
Manuel Peñalver	Men's road race	3:03:02	9

Women

Athlete	Event	Time	Rank
Ainara Albert	Road race	2:08:17	8
Ainara Albert	Time trial	23:04.37	5
Sandra Alonso	Road race	2:08:17	6
Sandra Alonso	Time trial	22:37.59	2nd place, silver medalist(s)

== Equestrian ==
Athlete	Horse	Event	Qualification		Final	
Athlete	Horse	Event	Penalties	Rank	Penalties	Rank
Carlos Bosch	Jolie Van der Berghoeve	Individual	0	1	0	1st place, gold medalist(s)
Pello Elorduy	Champenoise de Rampan	Individual	4	10	8	10
Álex Codina Lería	London Blue	Individual	8	23	DNS	
Bautista Rodríguez	Vivoulette HD	Individual	4	10	8	10
Carlos Bosch; Pello Elorduy; Álex Codina Lería; Bautista Rodríguez	Jolie Van der Berghoeve; Champenoise de Rampan; London Blue; Vivoulette HD	Team	0	1	4	2nd place, silver medalist(s)

== Fencing ==
Men's

Athlete	Event	Group Stage		Round of 16	Quarterfinal	Semifinal	Final / BM	
Athlete	Event	Opposition Score	Rank	Opposition Score	Opposition Score	Opposition Score	Opposition Score	Rank
Eugeni Gavaldá	Epeé	Boulière (FRA) W 4-3; Bassil (LBN) W 5-4; Frazão (POR) L 1-2; Berkane (ALG) L 3-5	3 Q	Cuomo (ITA); L 11-15	Did not advanced			
Ignacio Breteau	Foil	Filippi (ITA) L 1-5; Chagnon (FRA) L 5-4; Wakim (LBN) W 5-2; Hamza (EGY) L 3-5	4 Q	Tofalides (CYP); W 15-7	Filippi (ITA); L 9-15	Did not advanced		
Santiago Madrigal	Sabre	Cantini (FRA) W 5-2; Moataz (EGY) L 2-5; Fraboulet (FRA) W 1-5; Yaman (TUR) L 3-5	3 Q	Choueiry (FRA); W 15-9	Hesham (EGY); W 15-11	Yaman (TUR); L 4-15	—N/a	3rd place, bronze medalist(s)

Women's

Athlete	Event	Group Stage		Round of 16	Quarterfinal	Semifinal	Final / BM	
Athlete	Event	Opposition Score	Rank	Opposition Score	Opposition Score	Opposition Score	Opposition Score	Rank
Daniela Pinyol	Epeé	Paulis (ITA) L 4-5; Bouaouina (ALG) W 5-4; Vanryssel (FRA) L 4-5; Mavrikiou (CYP) W 3-5	3 Q	Traditi (ITA); W 15-10	Paulis (ITA); W 15-8	Vanryssel (FRA); L 7-15	—N/a	3rd place, bronze medalist(s)
Ariadna Tucker	Foil	Aye (FRA) W 3-5; Palumbo (ITA) L 5-4; Mecherek (TUN) W 4-5; Blažić (CRO) W 3-5	2 Q	Soussi (TUN); W 15-10	Chaldaiou (GRE); W 15-5	Kontochristopoulou (GRE); L 11-15	—N/a	3rd place, bronze medalist(s)
Lucía Martín-Portugués	Sabre	Manga (FRA) W 5-2; Daghfous (TUN) W 5-4; Arpino (ITA) W 1-5	1 Q	Bye	Guntura (GRE); W 15-13	Navarro (ESP); W 15-8	Erbil (TUR); W 15-11	1st place, gold medalist(s)
Araceli Navarro	Sabre	Vongsavady (FRA) W 5-4; Georgiadou (GRE) W 5-4; Mormile (ITA) L 2-5; Güngör (TUR) W 5-1	2 Q	Bye	Arpino (ITA); W 15-11	Martín-Portugués (ESP); L 8-15	—N/a	3rd place, bronze medalist(s)

== Finswimming ==
Men

Athlete	Event	Heat		Final	
Athlete	Event	Time	Rank	Time	Rank
Josu Goya Sarasola	50 m apnoea	15.14	4 q	15.12	7
José Manuel Santano Pérez	50 m apnoea	14.76	1 q	15.07	6
David Asín Menés	100 m surface	37.25	4 q	36.89	6
Josu Goya Sarasola	100 m surface	38.59	6	Did not advance	
David Asín Menés	200 m surface	1:25.99	2 q	1:25.56	7
Mario Rojas García	200 m surface	1:27.29	4	Did not advance	
Mario Rojas García	400 m surface	3:10.23	2 q	3:08.25	6
Miguel Trotsenko Byelyak	50 m bi-fins	19.50	2 q	19.25	3rd place, bronze medalist(s)
Mikel Usar Macaya	50 m bi-fins	21.39	4	Did not advance	
José Manuel Santano Pérez	100 m bi-fins	45.15	5	Did not advance	
Miguel Trotsenko Byelyak	100 m bi-fins	45.46	6	Did not advance	
Mikel Usar Macaya	200 m bi-fins	1:42.52	5 q	1:42.89	8
Mikel Usar Macaya	400 m bi-fins	3:38.56	4 q	3:41.42	6

Women

Athlete	Event	Heat		Final	
Athlete	Event	Time	Rank	Time	Rank
Marina Román Díaz	50 m apnoea	17.48	4 q	17.81	8
Marina Román Díaz	100 m surface	41.78	3 q	42.62	7
Alba Cabello Pérez	100 m surface	DSQ		Did not advance	
Mireia Bayes Ezquerro	200 m surface	1:36.09	5	Did not advance	
Irati Lakunza Elizalde	200 m surface	1:35.48	4 q	1:36.43	8
Mireia Bayes Ezquerro	400 m surface	3:30.17	4 q	3:28.17	5
Irati Lakunza Elizalde	400 m surface	3:34.79	4 q	—N/a	
Alba Cabello Pérez	50 m bi-fins	23.69	5	Did not advance	
Irati Zufiaurre Ayerra	100 m bi-fins	51.40	6	Did not advance	
Irati Zufiaurre Ayerra	200 m bi-fins	1:51.53	4 q	1:54.34	8
María Antón Alzamora	200 m bi-fins	1:56.87	5	Did not advanc	
María Antón Alzamora	400 m bi-fins	4:10.53	5	Did not advance	

Mixed

Athlete	Event	Heat		Final	
Athlete	Event	Time	Rank	Time	Rank
Miguel Trotsenko Byelyak; Irati Zufiaurre Ayerra; José Manuel Santano Pérez; Alba Cabello Pérez	4x50 m bi-fins	—N/a		1:23.14	4
David Asín Menés; Alba Cabello Pérez; José Manuel Santano Pérez; Marina Román Díaz	4x100 m surface	—N/a		2:36.04	4

== Judo ==
Men

Athlete	Event	Round of 16	Quarterfinals	Semifinals	Repechage 1	Repechage 2	Final / BM	
Athlete	Event	Opposition Result	Opposition Result	Opposition Result	Opposition Result	Opposition Result	Opposition Result	Rank
Luis Barroso	Men's 60 kg	—N/a	Ben Laribi (ALG); W Ippon (101-0)	Motoly-Bongambé (FRA); W Ippon (101-11)	—N/a		Alaoui Cherifi (MAR); L Ippon (0-100)	2nd place, silver medalist(s)
Adrian Nieto	Men's 66 kg	Bye	Clakar (CRO); W Waza-ari (10-0)	Christodoulides (CYP); L Yuko (0-1)	—N/a		Accogli (ITA); L Yuko (0-1)	5
José Antonio Aranda	Men's 73 kg	Hojak (SLO); L Yuko (2-1)	Did not advance					
José María Mendiola	Men's 81 kg	Cena (KOS); L Yuko (0-1)	Did not advance					
Daniel Nieto	Men's 90 kg	El Saikaly (LBN); W Ippon (100-0)	Sogenov (SRB); W Penalty (100-1)	Parlati (ITA); L Ippon (0-100)	—N/a		Novo Raicević (MNE); W Ippon (101-0)	3rd place, bronze medalist(s)

Women

Athlete	Event	Round of 16	Quarterfinals	Semifinals	Repechage 1	Repechage 2	Final / BM	
Athlete	Event	Opposition Result	Opposition Result	Opposition Result	Opposition Result	Opposition Result	Opposition Result	Rank
Mireia Rodriguez	Women's 48 kg	Bye	Annis (FRA); W Waza-ari (10-2)	Beder (TUR); L Yuko (0-1)	—N/a		Muminoviq (KOS); W Ippon (100-0)	3rd place, bronze medalist(s)
Laura Gomez	Women's 52 kg	Stojadinov (SRB); L Ippon (0-100)	Did not advance					
Adriana Rodriguez	Women's 57 kg	Bye	Berrahoual (ALG); W Penalty (100-0)	Perisić (SRB); L Ippon (101-0)	—N/a		Terranova (ITA); L Ippon (11-100)	5
Laura Vazquez	Women's 63 kg	Bye	Nisavić (SLO); W Ippon (100-0)	Avanzato (ITA); L Waza-ari (1-11)	—N/a		Oberan (CRO); L Ippon (100-0)	5
Nisrin Bousbaa	Women's 78 kg	Sperotti (ITA); L Waza-ari (10-0)	Did not advance					

Mixed

Athlete	Event	Round of 16	Quarterfinals	Semifinals	Repechage 1	Repechage 2	Final / BM	
Athlete	Event	Opposition Result	Opposition Result	Opposition Result	Opposition Result	Opposition Result	Opposition Result	Rank
Nisrin Bousbaa; José Antonio Aranda; Laura Gomez; José María Mendiola; Adrian Nieto; Daniel Nieto; Adriana Rodriguez; Laura Vazquez	Mixed Team	Greece; W 4-1	Italy; L 2-4	Did not advance	—N/a	Croatia; L 3-4	Did not advance	

== Karate ==
Kumite
Men

Athlete	Event	Round of 16	Quarterfinals	Semifinals	Repechage	Final	
Athlete	Event	Opposition Result	Opposition Result	Opposition Result	Opposition Result	Opposition Result	Rank
Zsamoran Shotte	Men's - 67 kg	Oubaya (MAR); L 1-11	Did not advance				
Joan Just	Men's - 75 kg	Jovović (MNE); W 5-2	De Vivo (ITA); L 4-5	Did not advance			
Iker Leal	Men's - 84 kg	Turulja (BIH); L 1-3	Did not advance				
Borja Gutierrez	Men's + 84 kg	Daikhi (ALG); L 2-3	Did not advance				

Women

Athlete	Event	Round of 16	Quarterfinals	Semifinals	Repechage	Final	
Athlete	Event	Opposition Result	Opposition Result	Opposition Result	Opposition Result	Opposition Result	Rank
Insaf Bentama-Serroukh	Women's - 50 kg	Reem Salama (EGY); L 1-10	Did not advance				
Ruth Lorenzo	Women's - 55 kg	Bye	Brunori (ITA); L 2-7	Did not advance	Youssef (EGY); L 1-5	Did not advance	
Mar Trenado	Women's - 61 kg	Benchbab (MAR); L 1-5	Did not advance				
Maria Isabel Nieto	Women's - 68 kg	Boudraa (ALG); W (0-0)	Becirovic (CRO); L 2-5	Did not advance			

== Padel ==
Men

Athlete	Event	Round of 32	Round of 16	Quarterfinals	Semifinals	Final / BM	
Athlete	Event	Opposition Score	Opposition Score	Opposition Score	Opposition Score	Opposition Score	Rank
Guillermo Collado; Pol Hermández	Men's Pairs	Bye	Hossam / Wakim (EGY); L 1-2 (4-6, 6-4, 5-7)	Did not advanced			
José Antonio Diestro; David Gala	Men's Pairs	Bye	Elloumi / Helali (TUN); W 2-0 (6-1, 6-1)	Araujo / Graça (POR); W 2-0 (7-6, 6-4)	Deus / Deus (POR); W 2-0 (7-5, 7-5)	Abbate / Caruso (ITA); W (7-6, 6-4)	1st place, gold medalist(s)

Women

Athlete	Event	Round of 32	Round of 16	Quarterfinals	Semifinals	Final / BM	
Athlete	Event	Opposition Score	Opposition Score	Opposition Score	Opposition Score	Opposition Score	Rank
Patty Llaguno; Lucía Sainz	Women's pairs	Bye	Matijevic / Simonovic (MNE); W 0-2 (1-6, 0-6)	Chamli / Allani (TUN); W 0-2 (0-6, 1-6)	Marchetti / Orsi (ITA); W 2-0 (6-3, 6-4)	Rodríguez / Velasco Postiguillo (ESP); W 2-0 (6-3, 6-4)	1st place, gold medalist(s)
Nuria Rodríguez; Jimena Velasco Postiguillo	Women's pairs	Bye	Balog / Jurkovic (CRO); W 2-0 (6-2, 6-0)	Merah / Soubrié (FRA); W 2-0 (6-1, 6-1)	Araujo / Nogueira (POR); W 2-0 (6-1, 6-2)	Llaguno / Sainz (ESP); L 0-2 (3-6, 4-6)	2nd place, silver medalist(s)

== Rhythmic gymnastics ==
Athlete	Event	Qualification						Final					
Athlete	Event	Hoop	Ball	Clubs	Ribbon	Total	Rank	Hoop	Ball	Clubs	Ribbon	Total	Rank
Alba Bautista	All-around	27.900	26.150	24.450	26.800	80.850	3 Q	27.550	23.950	25.450	25.100	102.050	7
Daniela Pico	All-around	27.600	21.900	28.400	26.950	82.950	1 Q	27.150	25.650	27.200	26.550	106.550	2nd place, silver medalist(s)

== Roller speed skating ==
Athlete	Event	Final	
Athlete	Event	Time	Rank
Adrián Alonso	Marathon	1:05:54.465	2nd place, silver medalist(s)
Patxi Peula	Marathon	1:10:26.570	4
Manuel Taibo	Marathon	1:10:26.974	8

== Rowing ==
Athlete	Event	Semifinals		Final	
Athlete	Event	Time	Rank	Time	Rank
Mikel Mardaras	Men's single sculls	7:05.84	3 fA	7:19.48	3rd place, bronze medalist(s)
Amanda Gil	Women's single sculls	7:54.30	3 fA	8:32.02	6
Danilo Marqués; Jordi Alexandrescu	Men's double sculls	6:28.13	5 fB	6:34.98	4
Lidia Florido; Aina Arteman	Women's double sculls	7:23.80	3 FA	7:31.53	4

== Shooting ==
Rifle & pistol

Athlete	Event	Qualification		Final	
Athlete	Event	Points	Rank	Points	Rank
Jesús Oviedo	Men's 10 m air rifle	627.6	8 Q	185.4	5
Inés Martinon	Women's 10 m air rifle	628.6	4 Q	163.1	6
Inés Martinon; Jesús Oviedo	Mixed team 10 m air rifle	627.7	3	Did not advanced	
Martín Freije	Men's 10 m air pistol	571 13x	9	Did not advanced	
Inés Ortega	Women's 10 m air pistol	550 9x	22	Did not advanced	
Martín Freije; Inés Ortega	Mixed team 10 m air pistol	560	6	Did not advance	

Shotgun

Athlete	Event	Qualification		Final	
Athlete	Event	Points	Rank	Points	Rank
Andrés García	Men's trap	121	2 Q	28	1st place, gold medalist(s)
Mar Molné	Women's trap	115	3 Q	14	4
Andrés García; Mar Molné	Trap mixed team	144	2 Q	34	2nd place, silver medalist(s)

== Skateboarding ==
Athlete	Event	Qualification		Final	
Athlete	Event	Score	Rank	Score	Rank
Luis Cabarcos	Men's Street	146.99	3 Q	157.68	3rd place, bronze medalist(s)

== Swimming ==
Men

Athlete	Event	Heat		Final	
Athlete	Event	Time	Rank	Time	Rank
Josep Castro	50 m freestyle	22.80	9	Did not advanced	
Josep Castro	100 m freestyle	49.58	2 Q	49.86	7
Teo Del Riego	100 m backstroke	56.62	10	Did not advanced	
Teo Del Riego	50 m butterfly	23.48	2 Q	23.40	4
Teo Del Riego	100 m butterfly	53.58	7 Q	52.88	5
Ian Florencio	100 m freestyle	50.71	11	Did not advanced	
Ian Florencio	200 m freestyle	1:51.18	12	Did not advanced	
Alberto Hernández	200 m freestyle	1:50.69	10	Did not advanced	
Alberto Hernández	200 m medley	2:04.41	10	Did not advanced	
Alberto Hernández	400 m medley	4:22.28	3 Q	4:19.23	4
Miguel Martínez Novoa	100 m butterfly	54.03	10	Did not advanced	
Miguel Martínez Novoa	200 m butterfly	1:58.31	2 Q	1:58.52	6
Diego Mira	200 m backstroke	2:02.49	7 Q	1:59.81	5
Diego Mira	200 m medley	2:03.25	8 Q	2:07.57	8
Diego Mira	400 m medley	4:21.07	2 Q	4:19.87	6
Joaquín Pardo	50 m breaststroke	27.95	6 Q	28.32	7
Joaquín Pardo	100 m breaststroke	1:01.07	3 Q	1:00.58	3rd place, bronze medalist(s)
Cristóbal Vargas	400 m freestyle	3:52.00	5 Q	3:51.33	6
Cristóbal Vargas	800 m freestyle	—N/a		7:58.83	5
Cristóbal Vargas	1500 m freestyle	—N/a		15:07.37	2nd place, silver medalist(s)

Women

Athlete	Event	Heat		Final	
Athlete	Event	Time	Rank	Time	Rank
Ainhoa Campabadal	50 m freestyle	26.54	11	Did not advanced	
Ainhoa Campabadal	100 m freestyle	56.01	3 Q	55.40	3rd place, bronze medalist(s)
Ainhoa Campabadal	200 m freestyle	2:00.75	2 Q	1:57.90	1st place, gold medalist(s)
Carla Carrón	200 m freestyle	2:02.38	5 Q	2:02.54	7
Carla Carrón	400 m freestyle	4:19.62	5 Q	4:15.43	4
Esther Cordente	50 m breaststroke	31.78	4 Q	31.73	4
Esther Cordente	100 m breaststroke	1:10.51	10	Did not advanced	
Aina Fernández	100 m breaststroke	1:10.58	11	Did not advanced	
Aina Fernández	200 m breaststroke	2:30.08	3 Q	2:29.93	6
Tamara Frías	50 m backstroke	28.81	3 Q	28.44	3rd place, bronze medalist(s)
Tamara Frías	100 m backstroke	1:02.12	3 Q	1:02.24	4
Tamara Frías	50 m butterfly	27.94	13	Did not advanced	
Nahia Garrido	100 m backstroke	1:03.13	6 Q	1:03.25	6
Nahia Garrido	200 m backstroke	2:17.17	5 Q	2:15.24	6
Paula González	200 m backstroke	2:15.86	1 Q	2:14.48	4
Paula González	200 m butterfly	2:13.40	3 Q	2:11.10	3rd place, bronze medalist(s)
Paula González	400 m medley	—N/a		4:48.68	3rd place, bronze medalist(s)
Naiara Sobreviela	50 m freestyle	26.56	12	Did not advanced	
Naiara Sobreviela	100 m freestyle	56.83	8 Q	56.87	8
Naiara Sobreviela	50 m butterfly	27.49	9	Did not advanced	
Naiara Sobreviela	100 m butterfly	1:00.06	5 Q	1:00.06	6

Mixed

Athlete	Event	Heat		Final	
Athlete	Event	Time	Rank	Time	Rank
Diego Mira; Joaquín Pardo ^{F} Naiara Sobreviela; Ainhoa Campabadal ^{F} Esther Cordente ^{H} Josep Castro ^{H}	4x100 medley relay	3:53.42	2 Q	DQ	—N/a

== Table tennis ==
Men

Athlete	Event	Round of 32	Round of 16	Quarterfinals	Semifinals	Final / BM	
Athlete	Event	Opposition Result	Opposition Result	Opposition Result	Opposition Result	Opposition Result	Rank
Daniel Berzosa	Men's Singles	Hribar (SLO); W 4-2	Seyfried (FRA); L0-4	Did not advance			
Juan Pérez Chico	Men's Singles	Petrovski (SLO); W 4-2	Assar (EGY); L 1-4	Did not advance			
Daniel Berzosa; Juan Pérez Chico	Men's Team	—N/a	Lebanon (LBN); W 3-0	Algeria (ALG); W 3-1	Egypt (EGY); L 1-3	France (FRA); W 3-1	3rd place, bronze medalist(s)

Women

Athlete	Event	Round of 32	Round of 16	Quarterfinals	Semifinals	Final / BM	
Athlete	Event	Opposition Result	Opposition Result	Opposition Result	Opposition Result	Opposition Result	Rank
Elvira Rad	Women's Singles	Yang (MON); L 0-4	Did not advanced				
Sofia-Xuan Zhang	Women's Singles	Agolli (ALB); W 4-0	Piccolin (ITA); L 0-4	Did not advance			
Elvira Rad; Sofia-Xuan Zhang	Women's Team	—N/a	Slovenia (SLO); L 2-3	Did not advanced			

Mixed

Athlete	Event	Round of 32	Round of 16	Quarterfinals	Semifinals	Final / BM	
Athlete	Event	Opposition Result	Opposition Result	Opposition Result	Opposition Result	Opposition Result	Rank
Juan Pérez Chico; Sofia-Xuan Zhang	Mixed Doubles	Freitas / Pinto (POR); W 3-2	Yigenler / Harac (TUR); L 1-3	Did not advance			

== Taekwondo ==
Men

Athlete	Event	Qualification	Round of 16	Quarterfinals	Semifinals	Final / BM	
Athlete	Event	Opposition Result	Opposition Result	Opposition Result	Opposition Result	Opposition Result	Rank
Jesús Fraile	Men's − 58 kg	—N/a	Kafataridis (GRE); W 2-1	Cirivello (ITA); W 0-2	Teskera (CRO); L 1-2	Did not advanced	3rd place, bronze medalist(s)
Joan Jorquera	Men's − 68 kg	Bye	Charalambous (CYP); W 2-0	Krajišnik (SRB); L 0-2	Did not advance		
Mikel Fernández	Men's − 80 kg	—N/a	Gashi (KOS); W 2-1	Katusi (TUN); L0-2	Did not advance		
Iván García	Men's + 80 kg	—N/a	Mehnana (FRA); W 2-0	Tholiotis (GRE); W 2-0	Elasbi (MAR); L 2-0	Did not advance	3rd place, bronze medalist(s)

Women

Athlete	Event	Round of 16	Quarterfinals	Semifinals	Final / BM	
Athlete	Event	Opposition Result	Opposition Result	Opposition Result	Opposition Result	Rank
Carla Sesar	Women's − 57 kg	Boubacir (FRA); W 2-0	Avdagić (BIH); L 0-2	Did not advance		
Helena García	Women's − 67 kg	Gashi (KOS); W 2-0	Zafer (TUR); L 0-2	Did not advance		
Ane Vallo	Men's + 67 kg	Bye	Berišaj (MNE); W 2-0	Uzunçavdar (TUR); L 1-2	Did not advance	3rd place, bronze medalist(s)

== Tennis ==
Men

Athlete	Event	Round of 32	Round of 16	Quarterfinals	Semifinals	Final / BM	
Athlete	Event	Opposition Score	Opposition Score	Opposition Score	Opposition Score	Opposition Score	Rank
Alejandro Marti	Men's singles	Rocha (POR); L 1-2	Did not advance				
Alejo Sanchez Quilez	Men's singles	Bye	Jovanović (MNE); W 2-0	Dlimi (MAR); W 2-0	Alberto Caniato (ITA); W 2-0	Bennani (MAR); L 1-2	2nd place, silver medalist(s)
Alejandro Marti; Alejo Sanchez Quilez	Men's double	—N/a	Bye	Abderrahman / Ouakaa (TUN); W 1-2	De Gabriele / Delicata (MLT); W 2-0	Dlimi / Lalami (MAR); L 2-0	2nd place, silver medalist(s)

Women

Athlete	Event	Round of 32	Round of 16	Quarterfinals	Semifinals	Final / BM	
Athlete	Event	Opposition Score	Opposition Score	Opposition Score	Opposition Score	Opposition Score	Rank
Lucia Cortez Llorca	Women's singles	Bye	Matias (POR); W 2-0	Basiletti (ITA); L 0-2	Did not advance		
María García	Women's singles	El Jardi (MAR); W 2-0	Cengiz (TUR); W 2-1	Serban (CYP); W 2-0	Matoula (GRE); L 0-2	Kabbaj (MAR); L 0-2	4
Lucia Cortez Llorca; María García	Women's double	—N/a		Papakyriacou / Serban (CYP); W 2-0	Basiletti / Paganetti (ITA); L 0-2	Buyukakcay / Cengiz (TUR); L 0-2	4

Mixed

Athlete	Event	Round of 16	Quarterfinals	Semifinals	Final / BM	
Athlete	Event	Opposition Score	Opposition Score	Opposition Score	Opposition Score	Rank
Alejo Sanchez Quilez; Lucia Cortez Llorca	Mixed double	Bye	Genovese / De Gabriele (MLT); W 2-0	El Jardi / Lalami (MAR); W 2-1	Paganetti / Romano (ITA); L 0-2	2nd place, silver medalist(s)

== Triathlon ==
Individual

Athlete	Event	Time						Rank
Athlete	Event	Swim (1.5 km)	Trans 1	Bike (40 km)	Trans 2	Run (10 km)	Total	Rank
Eduardo Blanco	Men's	9:21	0:20	28:08	0:21	16:03	54:13	3rd place, bronze medalist(s)
Jarno Pousada	Men's	9:53	0:19	29:06	0:26	16:39	56:23	8
Natalia Castro	Women's	13:14	0:20	31:41	0:21	17:33	1:03:09	4
Alejandra Seguí	Women's	13:14	0:21	31:37	0:24	17:55	1:03:31	5

Relay

Athlete	Event	Time						Rank
Athlete	Event	Swim (300 m)	Trans 1	Bike (7 km)	Trans 2	Run (2 km)	Total group	Rank
Eduardo Blanco	Mixed relay	3:37	0:12	3:29	0:17	1:51	19:00	—N/a
Jarno Pousada	Mixed relay	3:45	0:12	3:34	0:27	2:05	19:34	—N/a
Natalia Castro	Mixed relay	4:13	0:16	3:59	0:18	2:09	21:40	—N/a
Alejandra Seguí	Mixed relay	4:03	0:15	3:54	0:16	2:09	20:52	—N/a
Total	Mixed relay	—N/a					1:21:06	2nd place, silver medalist(s)

== Volleyball ==
Summary

Team	Event	Group Stage					Semifinal	Final / BM	
Team	Event	Opposition Score	Opposition Score	Opposition Score	Opposition Score	Rank	Opposition Score	Opposition Score	Rank
Spain	Men's tournament	Egypt; W 3-0	Kosovo; W 3-0	Greece; L 1-3	Turkey; L 1-3	3	Did not advanced		

== Water polo ==
Summary

Team	Event	Group Stage					Semifinal	Final / BM	
Team	Event	Opposition Score	Opposition Score	Opposition Score	Opposition Score	Rank	Opposition Score	Opposition Score	Rank
Spain	Men's tournament	Turkey; W 15-9	Bosnia and Herzegovina; W 33-3	France; W 16-10	Italy; L 13-14	2 Q	Montenegro; L 14-15	Serbia; L 8-12	4

== Weightlifting ==
Men

Athlete	Event	Snatch		Clean & Jerk	
Athlete	Event	Result	Rank	Result	Rank
Killian Gallart	Men's 75 kg	137	5	165	4
Javier González	Men's 85 kg	145	6	175	6
Marcos Ruiz	Men's 110 kg	185	1st place, gold medalist(s)	208	2nd place, silver medalist(s)

Women

Athlete	Event	Snatch		Clean & Jerk	
Athlete	Event	Result	Rank	Result	Rank
Alba Sánchez	Women's 53 kg	81	4	105	1st place, gold medalist(s)
María Olalla	Women's 61 kg	90	3rd place, bronze medalist(s)	112	2nd place, silver medalist(s)
Garoa Martínez	Women's 69 kg	96	5	120	4

== Wrestling ==
Men's Freestyle

Athlete	Event	Round of 16	Quarterfinal	Semifinal	Repechage	Final / BM	Rank
Carlos Álvarez	65 kg	—N/a	Duman (TUR); L 1–11 ^{SU}	Did not advanced	—N/a	Laribi (ALG); L 1–11 ^{VO1}	—N/a
Mohammad Mottaghinia	74 kg	Finizio (ITA); W 11–0 ^{SU}	Zarb (MLT); W 10–0 ^{SU}	Dudayev (ALB); L 1–3 ^{PO1}	Bye	Ioakeimidis (GRE); W 10–0 ^{SU}	3rd place, bronze medalist(s)
Gabriel Iglesias	86 kg	Bye	Choiras (CYP); W 10–0 ^{SU}	Küçüksolak (TUR); L 0–5 ^{PO}	—N/a	Magamadov (TUR); L 0–10 ^{su}	—N/a

Greco-Roman

Athlete	Event	Round of 16	Quarterfinal	Semifinal	Repechage	Final / BM	Rank
Marcos Sánchez-Silva	77 kg	Chekly (MAR); W 3–3 ^{IN}	Kolitsopoulos (GRE); L 1–6 ^{PO}	Did not advance			

Women's Freestyle

Athlete	Event	Round of 16	Quarterfinal	Semifinal	Repechage	Final / BM	Rank
Aintzane Gorria	50 kg	Bye	Ahmed (EGY); L 6–7 ^{PO1}	Did not advanced			
Carla Jaume	53 kg	—N/a	Chebila (ALG); W 7–0 ^{PO}	Chabki (MAR); W 10–0 ^{SU}	—N/a	Kamal (TUR); L 0–10 ^{SU}	2nd place, silver medalist(s)
Lydia Pérez	57 kg	—N/a	Konsevich (MKD); W 4–1 ^{PO}	Perovic (SRB); W 10–0 ^{SU}	—N/a	Kamaloğlu (TUR); L 4–0 ^{PO}	2nd place, silver medalist(s)
