= Swimming at the 2026 Mediterranean Games – Women's 50 metre backstroke =

Women's 50 metre backstroke at the 2026 Mediterranean Games
- Location: Taranto, Italy
- Dates: 23 August
- Competitors: 15 from 11 nations
- Winning time: 28.03

Medalists
gold medal	Costanza Cocconcelli	Italy
silver medal	Martina Biasolo	Italy
bronze medal	Tamara Frías	Spain

The Women's 50 metre backstroke competition at the 2026 Mediterranean Games was held on 23 August 2026 at the Torre d'Ayala Swimming Stadium in Taranto, Italy.

== Records ==
Prior to this competition, the existing world and Mediterranean Games records were as follows:

Record	Athlete	Time	Location	Date
World record	Sara Curtis (ITA)	26.56	Paris, France	13 August 2026
Mediterranean Games record	Silvia Scalia (ITA)	28.33	Tarragona, Spain	23 June 2018

During the competition, Costanza Cocconcelli set a new Mediterranean Games record of 27.85 seconds in the heats.

== Results ==
=== Heats ===
The heats were started at 10:00.

Rank	Heat	Lane	Name	Nationality	Time	Notes
1	2	4	Costanza Cocconcelli	Italy	27.85	q, CR
2	1	4	Martina Biasioli	Italy	28.29	q
3	2	5	Tamara Frías	Spain	28.81	q
4	1	3	Camila Rebelo	Portugal	28.96	q
5	1	5	Nina Stanisavljević	Serbia	29.02	q
6	2	3	Rafaela Azevedo	Portugal	29.07	q
7	2	6	Kalia Antoniou	Cyprus	29.27	q
8	2	2	Amel Melih	Algeria	29.32	q
9	1	6	Sudem Denizli	Turkey	29.53	
10	2	7	Selen Özbilen	Turkey	29.87	
11	1	2	Eleni Antoniadou	Greece	30.05	
12	1	7	Hana Beiqi	Kosovo	30.31	
13	1	1	Erina Idrizaj	Kosovo	30.88	
14	2	1	Luna Djarmati	Albania	31.69	
15	2	8	Taline Mourad	Lebanon	32.74	

=== Final ===
The final was held at 18:00.

Rank	Lane	Name	Nationality	Time	Notes
1st place, gold medalist(s)	4	Costanza Cocconcelli	Italy	28.03	
2nd place, silver medalist(s)	5	Martina Biasioli	Italy	28.24	
3rd place, bronze medalist(s)	3	Tamara Frías	Spain	28.44	
4	6	Camila Rebelo	Portugal	28.67	
5	2	Nina Stanisavljević	Serbia	28.74	
6	7	Rafaela Azevedo	Portugal	29.11	
7	1	Amel Melih	Algeria	29.22	
8	8	Sudem Denizli	Turkey	29.63	
