= Swimming at the 2026 Mediterranean Games – Women's 50 metre butterfly =

Women's 50 metre butterfly at the 2026 Mediterranean Games
- Venue: Stadio del nuoto Torre d'Ayala
- Location: Taranto, Italy
- Dates: 22 August
- Competitors: 22 from 15 nations
- Winning time: 26.11

Medalists
gold medal	Anna Ntountounaki	Greece
silver medal	Viola Scotto Di Carlo	Italy
bronze medal	Farida Osman	Egypt

The women's 50 metre butterfly competition at the 2026 Mediterranean Games was held on 22 August at the Torre d'Ayala Swimming Stadium in Taranto.

== Records ==
Prior to this competition, the existing world and Mediterranean Games records were as follows:

World record	Sarah Sjöström (SWE)	24.43	Borås, Sweden	5 July 2014
Mediterranean Games record	Farida Osman (EGY)	25.48	Tarragona, Spain	24 June 2018

== Results ==
=== Heats ===
Heats were started at 10:30.

Rank	Heat	Lane	Name	Nationality	Time	Notes
1	1	4	Viola Scotto Di Carlo	Italy	26.57	q
2	2	5	Elena Capretta	Italy	26.73	q
3	3	3	Kalia Antoniou	Cyprus	26.78	q
4	2	4	Anna Ntountounaki	Greece	26.80	q
5	3	4	Farida Osman	Egypt	26.85	q
6	3	5	Anna Vlachou	Greece	27.04	q
7	3	6	Nina Stanisavljević	Serbia	27.31	q
8	2	3	Mariana Pacheco de Sousa	Portugal	27.34	q
9	1	3	Naiara Sobreviela	Spain	27.49	
10	1	6	Ela Su Erensoy	Turkey	27.60	
11	3	2	Dila Gençay	Turkey	27.70	
12	2	7	Janja Šegel	Slovenia	27.86	
13	2	6	Tamara Frías	Spain	27.94	
14	2	2	Anemari Košak	Slovenia	27.98	
15	1	7	Hana Beiqi	Kosovo	28.09	
16	3	8	Imane El Barodi	Morocco	28.10	
17	1	2	Rafaela Azevedo	Portugal	28.28	
18	1	5	Ilaria Ceccaroni	San Marino	28.38	
19	3	7	Arla Dermishi	Albania	28.49	
20	1	1	Loricia Awad	Lebanon	28.78	
	2	1	Nesrine Medjahed	Algeria	Did not start	
	3	1	Lilia Sihem Midouni	Algeria	Did not start	

=== Final ===
Final will be held at 18:00.

Rank	Lane	Name	Nationality	Time	Notes
1st place, gold medalist(s)	6	Anna Ntountounaki	Greece	26.11	
2nd place, silver medalist(s)	4	Viola Scotto Di Carlo	Italy	26.29	
3rd place, bronze medalist(s)	2	Farida Osman	Egypt	26.32	
4	3	Kalia Antoniou	Cyprus	26.41	
5	5	Elena Capretta	Italy	26.59	
6	7	Anna Vlachou	Greece	26.91	
7	1	Nina Stanisavljević	Serbia	27.21	
8	8	Mariana Pacheco de Sousa	Portugal	27.45	
