= Swimming at the 2026 Mediterranean Games – Women's 50 metre freestyle =

Women's 50 metre freestyle at the 2026 Mediterranean Games
- Location: Taranto, Italy
- Dates: 25 August
- Competitors: 22 from 16 nations
- Winning time: 24.92

Medalists
| gold medal | Kalia Antoniou | Cyprus |
| silver medal | Elena Capretta | Italy |
| bronze medal | Agata Maria Ambler | Italy |

The Women's 50 metre freestyle competition at the 2026 Mediterranean Games was held on 25 August 2026 at the Torre d'Ayala Swimming Stadium in Taranto.

== Records ==
Prior to this competition, the existing world and Mediterranean Games records were as follows:

| World record | Kate Douglass (USA) | 23.19 | Irvine, United States | 15 August 2026 |
| Mediterranean Games record | Farida Osman (EGY) | 24.83 | Tarragona, Spain | 25 June 2018 |

== Results ==
=== Heats ===
The heats were started at 10:12.

| Rank | Heat | Lane | Swimmer | Nation | Time | Notes |
|---|---|---|---|---|---|---|
| 1 | 1 | 4 | Kalia Antoniou | Cyprus | 25.12 | Q |
| 1 | 2 | 4 | Elena Capretta | Italy | 25.12 | Q |
| 3 | 3 | 5 | Agata Maria Ambler | Italy | 25.23 | Q |
| 4 | 3 | 4 | Farida Osman | Egypt | 25.55 | Q |
| 5 | 2 | 5 | Nina Stanisavljević | Serbia | 25.73 | Q |
| 6 | 1 | 3 | Selen Özbilen | Turkey | 25.84 | Q |
| 7 | 3 | 3 | Anna Ntountounaki | Greece | 25.88 | Q |
| 8 | 1 | 5 | Amel Melih | Algeria | 25.89 | Q |
| 9 | 2 | 3 | Ana Rodrigues | Portugal | 26.12 | |
| 10 | 2 | 6 | Anemari Košak | Slovenia | 26.36 | |
| 11 | 1 | 6 | Ainhoa Campabadal | Spain | 26.54 | |
| 12 | 3 | 6 | Naiara Sobreviela | Spain | 26.56 | |
| 13 | 3 | 7 | Hana Beiqi | Kosovo | 26.72 | |
| 14 | 2 | 2 | Mia Hren | Croatia | 26.87 | |
| 15 | 2 | 7 | Helena Lalković | Serbia | 26.88 | |
| 16 | 1 | 2 | Nika Fain | Slovenia | 26.93 | |
| 17 | 2 | 1 | Jovana Kuljaca | Montenegro | 27.08 | |
| 18 | 1 | 7 | Ilaria Ceccaroni | San Marino | 27.09 | |
| 19 | 3 | 1 | Arla Dermishi | Albania | 27.22 | |
| 20 | 3 | 2 | Beren Başaran | Turkey | 27.29 | |
| 21 | 1 | 1 | Loricia Rita Awad | Lebanon | 27.52 | |
| 22 | 3 | 8 | Riga Shala | Kosovo | 28.11 | |

=== Final ===
The final was held at 18:10.

| Rank | Lane | Name | Nationality | Time | Notes |
|---|---|---|---|---|---|
| 1st place, gold medalist(s) | 4 | Kalia Antoniou | Cyprus | 24.92 | |
| 2nd place, silver medalist(s) | 5 | Elena Capretta | Italy | 25.02 | |
| 3rd place, bronze medalist(s) | 3 | Agata Maria Ambler | Italy | 25.12 | |
| 4 | 6 | Farida Osman | Egypt | 25.26 | |
| 5 | 1 | Anna Ntountounaki | Greece | 25.64 | |
| 6 | 2 | Nina Stanisavljević | Serbia | 25.70 | |
| 7 | 7 | Selen Özbilen | Turkey | 25.82 | |
| 8 | 8 | Amel Melih | Algeria | 26.02 | |
