= Swimming at the 2026 Mediterranean Games – Women's 100 metre freestyle =

Women's 100 metre freestyle at the 2026 Mediterranean Games
- Location: Taranto, Italy
- Dates: 24 August
- Competitors: 21 from 15 nations
- Winning time: 54.60

Medalists
gold medal	Kalia Antoniou	Cyprus
silver medal	Chiara Tarantino	Italy
bronze medal	Ainhoa Campabadal	Spain

The Women's 100 metre freestyle competition at the 2026 Mediterranean Games was held on 24 August 2026 at the Torre d'Ayala Swimming Stadium in Taranto, Italy.

== Records ==
Prior to this competition, the existing world and Mediterranean Games records were as follows:

Record	Athlete	Time	Location	Date
World record	Marrit Steenbergen (NED)	51.68	Roma, Italy	27 June 2026
Mediterranean Games record	Janja Šegel (SLO)	54.26	Oran, Algeria	5 July 2022

== Results ==
=== Heats ===
The heats were started at 10:00.

Rank	Heat	Lane	Name	Nationality	Time	Notes
1	3	4	Kalia Antoniou	Cyprus	54.90	q
2	2	5	Matilde Biagiotti	Italy	55.90	q
3	1	4	Ainhoa Campabadal	Spain	56.01	q
4	2	4	Chiara Tarantino	Italy	56.15	q
5	1	5	Janja Šegel	Slovenia	56.43	q
6	3	5	Anna Vlachou	Greece	56.61	q
7	2	3	Helena Lalkovic	Serbia	56.77	q
8	3	3	Naiar Sobreviela	Spain	56.83	q
9	1	6	Amel Melih	Algeria	57.25	R1
10	3	6	Selen Özbilen	Turkey	57.55	R2
11	2	2	Ilaria Ceccaroni	San Marino	58.26	
12	2	6	Mia Hren	Croatia	58.32	
13	1	3	Beren Başaran	Turkey	59.20	
14	2	7	Loricia Rita Awad	Lebanon	59.21	
15	3	2	Nika Fain	Slovenia	59.63	
16	1	2	Arla Dermishi	Albania	59.98	
17	1	7	Sara Jankovikj	North Macedonia	1:00.97	
18	3	7	Jovana Kuljaca	Montenegro	1:01.29	
19	3	1	Angela Doumanian	Lebanon	1:01.32	
20	2	1	Riga Shala	Kosovo	1:01.59	
21	1	1	Luna Djarmati	Albania	1:03.16	

=== Final ===
The final was held at 18:50.

Rank	Lane	Name	Nationality	Time	Notes
1st place, gold medalist(s)	4	Kalia Antoniou	Cyprus	54.60	
2nd place, silver medalist(s)	6	Chiara Tarantino	Italy	54.67	
3rd place, bronze medalist(s)	3	Ainhoa Campabadal	Spain	55.40	
4	5	Matilde Biagiotti	Italy	55.78	
5	7	Anna Vlachou	Greece	55.82	
6	2	Janja Šegel	Slovenia	55.83	
7	1	Helena Lalkovic	Serbia	56.60	
8	8	Naiar Sobreviela	Spain	56.87	
