= Swimming at the 2026 Mediterranean Games – Women's 100 metre backstroke =

Women's 100 metre backstroke at the 2026 Mediterranean Games
- Location: Taranto, Italy
- Dates: 25 August
- Competitors: 12 from 9 nations
- Winning time: 1:00.37

Medalists
gold medal	Camila Rebelo	Portugal
silver medal	Federica Toma	Italy
bronze medal	Martina Biasoli	Italy

The Women's 100 metre backstroke competition at the 2026 Mediterranean Games was held on 25 August 2026 at the Torre d'Ayala Swimming Stadium in Taranto, Italy.

== Records ==
Prior to this competition, the existing world and Mediterranean Games records were as follows:

Record	Athlete	Time	Location	Date
World record	Regan Smith (USA)	57.13	Indianapolis, United States	18 June 2024
Mediterranean Games record	Margherita Panziera (ITA)	1:00.54	Tarragona, Spain	25 June 2018

During the competition, Camila Rebelo set a new Mediterranean Games record of 1:00.37 seconds in the final.

== Results ==
=== Heats ===
The heats were started at 10:45.

Rank	Heat	Lane	Name	Nationality	Time	Notes
1	2	4	Camila Rebelo	Portugal	1:01.45	q
2	2	5	Martina Biasioli	Italy	1:01.81	q
3	2	6	Tamara Frías	Spain	1:02.12	q
4	1	4	Federica Toma	Italy	1:02.31	q
5	2	3	Eleni Antoniadou	Greece	1:02.69	q
6	1	3	Nahia Garrido Malvar	Spain	1:03.13	q
7	1	5	Sudem Denizli	Turkey	1:04.27	q
8	1	7	Anna Ntountounaki	Greece	1:04.33	q
9	2	2	Erina Idrizaj	Kosovo	1:08.56	
10	1	2	Taline Mourad	Lebanon	1:09.63	
11	2	7	Luna Djarmati	Albania	1:12.23	
	1	6	Rafaela Azevedo	Portugal	DNS	

=== Final ===
The final was held at 18:50.

Rank	Lane	Name	Nationality	Time	Notes
1st place, gold medalist(s)	4	Camila Rebelo	Portugal	1:00.37	GR
2nd place, silver medalist(s)	6	Federica Toma	Italy	1:00.74	
3rd place, bronze medalist(s)	5	Martina Biasioli	Italy	1:01.12	
4	3	Tamara Frías	Spain	1:02.24	
5	2	Eleni Antoniadou	Greece	1:02.35	
6	7	Nahia Garrido Malvar	Spain	1:03.25	
7	8	Anna Ntountounaki	Greece	1:03.60	
8	1	Sudem Denizli	Turkey	1:04.66	
