= Cycling at the 2026 Mediterranean Games – Women's road race =

Women's cycling road race at the 2026 Mediterranean Games
- Venue: Itria Valley
- Date: 24 August
- Competitors: 32 from 12 nations
- Winning time: 2:08:17

Medalists
| gold medal | Rachele Barbieri | Italy |
| silver medal | Martina Fidanza | Italy |
| bronze medal | Barbara Guarischi | Italy |

The women's road race was one of 4 cycling events of the 2026 Mediterranean Games in Taranto. The race started and finished on 24 August at the Itria Valley and was won by Rachele Barbieri of Italy.

== Schedule ==
All times are Central European Summer Time (UTC+02:00)

| Date | Time | Event |
|---|---|---|
| Monday, 24 August 2026 | 9:00 | Final |

== Results ==
Legend

- DNF — Did not finish

| Rank | Athlete | Time |
|---|---|---|
| 1st place, gold medalist(s) | Rachele Barbieri (ITA) | 2:08:17 |
| 2nd place, silver medalist(s) | Martina Fidanza (ITA) | 2:08:17 |
| 3rd place, bronze medalist(s) | Barbara Guarischi (ITA) | 2:08:17 |
| 4 | Nika Bobnar (SLO) | 2:08:17 |
| 5 | Argiro Milaki (GRE) | 2:08:17 |
| 6 | Sandra Alonso (ESP) | 2:08:17 |
| 7 | Eglantine Rayer (FRA) | 2:08:17 |
| 8 | Ainara Albert (ESP) | 2:08:17 |
| 9 | Varvara Fasoi (GRE) | 2:08:17 |
| 10 | Ilona Rouat (FRA) | 2:08:17 |
| 11 | Pija Galof (SLO) | 2:08:17 |
| 12 | Dominika Štrukelj (SLO) | 2:08:17 |
| 13 | Raquel Queirós (POR) | 2:08:17 |
| 14 | Nina Lavenu (FRA) | 2:08:17 |
| 15 | Nelia Kabetaj (ALB) | 2:08:17 |
| 16 | Tjaša Sušnik (SLO) | 2:08:22 |
| 17 | Beatriz Roxo (POR) | 2:08:22 |
| 18 | Amandine Muller (FRA) | 2:08:22 |
| 19 | Nesrine Houili (ALG) | 2:08:22 |
| 20 | Ekaterina Kovalchuk (CYP) | 2:08:22 |
| 21 | Malak Mechab (ALG) | 2:08:22 |
| 22 | Antri Christoforou (CYP) | 2:08:22 |
| 23 | Valentina Venerucci (SMR) | 2:08:26 |
| 24 | Elena Cecchini (ITA) | 2:08:45 |
| 25 | Reyhan Yakışır (TUR) | 2:13:31 |
| 26 | Sevim Gerçek (TUR) | 2:13:34 |
| 27 | Imene Maldji (ALG) | 2:13:34 |
| 28 | Styliana Camelari (CYP) | 2:18:31 |
| 29 | Yasmine Elmeddah (ALG) | 2:18:31 |
| 30 | Myran Alfares (SYR) | 2:18:31 |
| — | Nikol Dollaku (ALB) | DNF |
| — | Hala Zidan (SYR) | DNF |
