= Swimming at the 2026 Mediterranean Games – Men's 100 metre butterfly =

Men's 100 metre butterfly at the 2026 Mediterranean Games
- Location: Taranto, Italy
- Dates: 23 August
- Competitors: 16 from 11 nations
- Winning time: 52.11

Medalists
gold medal	Alberto Razzetti	Italy
silver medal	Edoardo Valsecchi	Italy
bronze medal	Youssef Ramadan	Egypt

The men's 100 metre butterfly competition at the 2026 Mediterranean Games was held on 23 August at the Torre d'Ayala Swimming Stadium in Taranto.

== Records ==
Prior to this competition, the existing world and Mediterranean Games records were as follows:

World record	Caeleb Dressel (USA)	49.45	Tokyo, Japan	31 July 2021
Mediterranean Games record	Matteo Rivolta (ITA)	51.66	Oran, Algeria	5 July 2022

== Results ==
=== Heats ===
Heats were started at 10:18.

Rank	Heat	Lane	Name	Nationality	Time	Notes
1	2	4	Alberto Razzetti	Italy	52.34	q
2	1	4	Youssef Ramadan	Egypt	52.54	q
3	1	3	Maro Miknić	Croatia	52.58	q
4	2	5	Edoardo Valsecchi	Italy	52.70	q
5	1	5	Vili Sivec	Croatia	52.90	q
6	1	6	Miloš Milenković	Montenegro	53.02	q
7	2	2	Teo Del Riego Torres	Spain	53.58	q
8	1	2	Vasco Alves Morgado	Portugal	53.77	q
9	2	3	Arda Akkoyun	Turkey	53.84	
10	2	7	Miguel Martinez Novoa	Spain	54.03	
11	1	7	Kevins Panchiy	Portugal	54.23	
12	2	1	Tuncer Berk Ertürk	Turkey	55.94	
13	1	1	Munzer Mark Kabbara	Lebanon	56.00	
14	2	8	Alessandro Rebosio	San Marino	56.16	
15	1	8	Rayan Arkadan	Lebanon	57.38	
	2	6	Apostolos Siskos	Greece	Did not start	

=== Final ===
Final will be held at 18:10.

Rank	Lane	Name	Nationality	Time	Notes
1st place, gold medalist(s)	4	Alberto Razzetti	Italy	52.11	
2nd place, silver medalist(s)	6	Edoardo Valsecchi	Italy	52.21	
3rd place, bronze medalist(s)	5	Youssef Ramadan	Egypt	52.22	
4	3	Maro Miknić	Croatia	52.80	
5	1	Teo Del Riego Torres	Spain	52.88	
6	2	Vili Sivec	Croatia	52.90	
7	7	Miloš Milenković	Montenegro	53.07	
8	8	Vasco Alves Morgado	Portugal	53.50	
