= Cycling at the 2026 Mediterranean Games – Men's road time trial =

Men's road time trial at the 2026 Mediterranean Games
- Venue: Taranto Urban Circuit (17 km)
- Date: 22 August
- Competitors: 22 from 13 nations
- Winning time: 20:05.96

Medalists
gold medal	Tiago Antunes	Portugal
silver medal	Bogdan Zabelinskiy	Cyprus
bronze medal	Rafael Reis	Portugal

The men's individual time trial was one of 4 cycling events of the 2026 Mediterranean Games. The event started and finished on 22 August at the Taranto Urban Circuit.

== Results ==
Pos.	Bib No.	Rider	Country	Time	Diff.
1st place, gold medalist(s)	16	Tiago Antunes	Portugal	20:05.96	
2nd place, silver medalist(s)	7	Bogdan Zabelinskiy	Cyprus	20:14.14	+8.18
3rd place, bronze medalist(s)	15	Rafael Reis	Portugal	20:14.64	+8.68
4	10	Mirco Maestri	Italy	20:23.27	+17.31
5	9	Luca Giaimi	Italy	20:30.13	+24.17
6	19	Mihael Štajnar	Slovenia	20:37.02	+31.06
7	17	Ognjen Ilić	Serbia	20:51.79	+45.83
8	22	José María García	Spain	21:05.80	+59.84
9	14	Andrea Mifsud	Malta	21:26.80	+1:20.84
10	18	Mihajlo Stolić	Serbia	21:33.16	+1:27.20
11	8	Georgios Bouglas	Greece	21:43.96	+1:38.00
12	6	Andreas Miltiadis	Cyprus	21:47.44	+1:41.48
13	13	Aidan Buttigieg	Malta	21:57.39	+1:51.43
14	25	Burak Abay	Turkey	22:02.10	+1:56.14
15	21	Estanislao Calabuig	Spain	22:07.37	+2:01.41
16	3	Yacine Hamza	Algeria	23:06.24	+3:00.28
17	23	Mohamed Aziz Dellai	Tunisia	23:19.87	+3:13.91
18	26	Ahmet Örken	Turkey	23:55.35	+3:49.39
19	1	Lukas Sulaj Kloppenborg	Albania	24:21.96	+4:16.00
20	11	Albion Kastrati	Kosovo	24:30.41	+4:24.45
21	2	Leo Piku	Albania	24:42.73	+4:36.77
22	12	Blerton Nuha	Kosovo	25:23.75	+5:17.79
	20	Matic Žumer	Slovenia	Did not start	
