= Swimming at the 2026 Mediterranean Games – Women's 200 metre freestyle =

Women's 200 metre freestyle at the 2026 Mediterranean Games
- Location: Taranto, Italy
- Dates: 23 August
- Competitors: 16 from 13 nations
- Winning time: 1:57.90

Medalists
gold medal	Ainhoa Campabadal	Spain
silver medal	Anna Chiara Mascolo	Italy
bronze medal	Francisca Martins	Portugal

The Women's 200 metre freestyle competition at the 2026 Mediterranean Games was held on 23 August 2026 at the Torre d'Ayala Swimming Stadiumin Taranto.

== Records ==
Prior to this competition, the existing world and Mediterranean Games records were as follows:

World record	Ariarne Titmus (AUS)	1:52.23	Brisbane, Australia	12 June 2024
Mediterranean Games record	Janja Šegel (SLO)	1:56.68	Oran, Algeria	2 July 2022

== Results ==
=== Heats ===
The heats were started at 10:25.

Rank	Heat	Lane	Name	Nationality	Time	Notes
1	1	4	Francisca Martins	Portugal	2:00.43	q
2	2	5	Ainhoa Campabadal	Spain	2:00.75	q
3	1	5	Anna Chiara Mascolo	Italy	2:01.29	q
4	1	3	Janja Šegel	Slovenia	2:01.68	q
5	2	3	Carla Carrón	Spain	2:02.38	q
6	1	6	Iman Avdić	Bosnia and Herzegovina	2:02.40	q
7	2	4	Bianca Nannucci	Italy	2:03.30	q
8	1	2	Helena Lalkovic	Serbia	2:03.61	q
9	2	2	Ecem Dönmez	Turkey	2:04.50	R1
10	2	7	Beren Basaran	Turkey	2:06.02	R2
11	1	7	Mia Hren	Croatia	2:06.22	
12	2	8	Angela Doumanian	Lebanon	2:08.71	
13	2	1	Margherita Gregorioni	San Marino	2:09.29	
14	1	1	Sara Jankovikj	North Macedonia	2:09.88	
15	1	8	Riga Shala	Kosovo	2:19.13	
	2	6	Artemis Vasilaki	Greece	Did not start	

=== Final ===
The final was held at 18:26.

Rank	Lane	Name	Nationality	Time	Notes
1st place, gold medalist(s)	5	Ainhoa Campabadal	Spain	1:57.90	
2nd place, silver medalist(s)	3	Anna Chiara Mascolo	Italy	1:58.53	
3rd place, bronze medalist(s)	4	Francisca Martins	Portugal	1:58.54	
4	1	Bianca Nannucci	Italy	2:00.78	
5	7	Iman Avdić	Bosnia and Herzegovina	2:01.42	=NR
6	6	Janja Šegel	Slovenia	2:01.62	
7	2	Carla Carrón	Spain	2:02.54	
8	8	Helena Lalkovic	Serbia	2:03.87	
