= Cycling at the 2026 Mediterranean Games – Women's road time trial =

Women's road time trial at the 2026 Mediterranean Games
- Venue: Taranto Urban Circuit (17km)
- Date: 22 August
- Competitors: 15 from 9 nations
- Winning time: 22:37.14

Medalists
gold medal	Amandine Muller	France
silver medal	Sandra Alonso	Spain
bronze medal	Nika Bobnar	Slovenia

The women's individual time trial was one of 4 cycling events of the 2026 Mediterranean Games. The event started and finished on 22 August at the Taranto Urban Circuit.

== Results ==
Pos.	Bib No.	Rider	Country	Time	Diff.
1st place, gold medalist(s)	7	Amandine Muller	France	22:37.14	
2nd place, silver medalist(s)	17	Sandra Alonso	Spain	22:37.59	+0.45
3rd place, bronze medalist(s)	14	Nika Bobnar	Slovenia	23:01.70	+24.56
4	10	Elena Cecchini	Italy	23:03.60	+26.46
5	16	Ainara Albert	Spain	23:04.37	+27.23
6	11	Martina Fidanza	Italy	23:16.20	+39.06
7	8	Églantine Rayer	France	23:24.64	+47.50
8	9	Varvara Fasoi	Greece	24:20.16	+1:43.02
9	13	Raquel Queirós	Portugal	24:54.45	+2:17.31
10	12	Beatriz Roxo	Portugal	25:10.54	+2:33.40
11	5	Antri Christoforou	Cyprus	25:12.55	+2:35.41
12	15	Dominika Štrukelj	Slovenia	25:35.83	+2:58.69
13	3	Nesrine Houili	Algeria	25:54.53	+3:17.39
14	19	Reyhan Yakişir	Turkey	26:54.63	+4:17.49
15	18	Sevim Gerçek	Turkey	27:01.73	+4:24.59
	1	Nikol Dollaku	Albania	Did not start	
	2	Nelia Kabetaj	Albania	Did not start	
