= Artistic gymnastics at the 2026 Mediterranean Games – Men's pommel horse =

Men's pommel horse at the 2026 Mediterranean Games
- Venue: Grottaglie Sports Hall
- Date: 2 September 2026
- Competitors: 8 from 7 nations
- Winning total: 14.250

Medalists
gold medal	(Spain) Ignacio Yockers
silver medal	(Egypt) Omar El Shobki
bronze medal	(Turkey) Ferhat Arıcan

The Men's pommel horse at the 2026 Mediterranean Games was held on 2 September 2026 at the Grottaglie Sports Hall.

== Qualification ==
Rank	Gymnast	D Score	E Score	Pen.	Total	Qual.
1	Ignacio Yockers (ESP)	5.6	8.600		14.200	Q
2	Matvei Petrov (ALB)	5.4	8.700		14.100	Q
3	Ferhat Arıcan (TUR)	5.6	8.350		13.950	Q
4	Antonios Tantalidis (GRE)	5.0	8.700		13.700	Q
5	Mohamed Afify (EGY)	5.2	8.500		13.700	Q
6	Mohamed El Shobki (EGY)	5.6	8.050		13.650	Q
7	Mateo Žugec (CRO)	5.3	8.150		13.450	Q
8	Abdelrahman Wakid (EGY)	5.3	8.150		13.450	–
9	Kevin Buckley (SLO)	4.9	8.450		13.350	Q
10	Gregor Rakovic (SLO)	5.1	8.150		13.250	R1
11	Marko Sambolec (CRO)	5.3	7.950		13.250	R2
12	Omar Mohamed (EGY)	4.7	8.500		13.200	–
13	Thierno Diallo (ESP)	5.1	8.000		13.100	R3

== Final ==
Rank	Gymnast	D Score	E Score	Pen.	Total
1st place, gold medalist(s)	Ignacio Yockers (ESP)	5.6	8.650		14.250
2nd place, silver medalist(s)	Omar El Shobki (EGY)	5.6	8.350		13.950
3rd place, bronze medalist(s)	Ferhat Arıcan (TUR)	5.6	8.150		13.750
4	Antonios Tantalidis (GRE)	5.0	8.650		13.650
5	Mohamed Afify (EGY)	5.2	8.350		13.550
6	Matvei Petrov (ALB)	5.4	7.350		12.750
7	Kevin Buckley (SLO)	4.8	7.550		12.350
8	Mateo Žugec (CRO)	5.1	7.050		12.150
