= Rhythmic gymnastics at the 2026 Mediterranean Games =

- Venue: Palasport CAMPITELLI
- Dates: 25–26 August
- Competitors: 27 from 17 nations

The rhythmic gymnastics competitions at the 2026 Mediterranean Games took place between 25 and 26 August at the Palasport CAMPITELLI in Grottaglie, Italy.

== Competition schedule ==
Athletes compete in 1 event, women's individual all-around.

Competitions followed this timetable:

●	Qualifications	●	Finals

August
22	23	24	25	26	27	28	29	30	31
			●	1					

== Participating nations ==
17 nations have applied to compete in rhythmic gymnastics.

- Andorra (1)
- Bosnia and Herzegovina (2)
- Cyprus (2)
- Egypt (2)
- France (2)
- Greece (2)
- Italy (2)
- Lebanon (2)
- Montenegro (1)
- North Macedonia (1)
- Portugal (1)
- Serbia (1)
- Slovenia (2)
- Spain (2)
- Syria (1)
- Tunisia (1)
- Turkey (2)

== Medal summary ==
Event	Gold	Silver	Bronze
Individual all-around	Hatice Gokce Emir; Turkey	Daniela Picó; Spain	Viola Sella; Italy

== Medal table ==
* Host nation (Italy)

Rank	Nation	Gold	Silver	Bronze	Total
1	Turkey	1	0	0	1
2	Spain	0	1	0	1
3	Italy*	0	0	1	1
Totals (3 entries)		1	1	1	3
