= Judo at the 2026 Mediterranean Games =

Judo competition

Judo Judo at the 2026 Mediterranean Games
- Venue: PalaWojtyla
- Location: Martina Franca, Italy
- Dates: 28–30 August
- Competitors: 155 from 22 nations

Competition at external databases
- Links: IJF • JudoInside

The judo event at the 2026 Mediterranean Games was held at the PalaWojtyla in Martina Franca, Italy from 28 to 30 August 2026.

== Medal table ==
* Host nation (Italy)

Rank	Nation	Gold	Silver	Bronze	Total
1	Turkey	3	0	3	6
2	Italy*	2	3	3	8
3	Croatia	2	0	2	4
4	Serbia	1	3	3	7
5	Morocco	1	2	0	3
6	France	1	1	5	7
7	Egypt	1	1	2	4
8	Cyprus	1	1	0	2
9	Algeria	1	0	0	1
9	Greece	1	0	0	1
9	Portugal	1	0	0	1
12	Kosovo	0	1	4	5
12	Slovenia	0	1	4	5
14	Spain	0	1	2	3
15	Tunisia	0	1	0	1
16	Bosnia and Herzegovina	0	0	1	1
16	Syria	0	0	1	1
Totals (17 entries)		15	15	30	60

== Medalists ==
=== Men ===
Event	Gold	Silver	Bronze
Extra-lightweight; 60 kg	Ahmed Alaoui Cherifi; Morocco	Luis Barroso López; Spain	Omran Ajena; Syria
Extra-lightweight; 60 kg	Ahmed Alaoui Cherifi; Morocco	Luis Barroso López; Spain	Salih Yıldız; Turkey
Half-lightweight; 66 kg	Marko Jorgić; Serbia	Petros Christodoulides; Cyprus	Alexis Renard; France
Half-lightweight; 66 kg	Marko Jorgić; Serbia	Petros Christodoulides; Cyprus	Valerio Accogli; Italy
Lightweight; 73 kg	Messaoud Dris; Algeria	Hassan Doukkali; Morocco	Akil Gjakova; Kosovo
Lightweight; 73 kg	Messaoud Dris; Algeria	Hassan Doukkali; Morocco	Martin Hojak; Slovenia
Half-middleweight; 81 kg	João Fernando; Portugal	Abdelrahman Abdelghany; Egypt	Nace Herkovič; Slovenia
Half-middleweight; 81 kg	João Fernando; Portugal	Abdelrahman Abdelghany; Egypt	Vedat Albayrak; Turkey
Middleweight; 90 kg	Aleksa Mitrovic; France	Christian Parlati; Italy	Toni Miletić; Bosnia and Herzegovina
Middleweight; 90 kg	Aleksa Mitrovic; France	Christian Parlati; Italy	Daniel Nieto; Spain
Half-heavyweight; 100 kg	Omar Elramly; Egypt	Milan Bulaja; Serbia	Shpati Zekaj; Kosovo
Half-heavyweight; 100 kg	Omar Elramly; Egypt	Milan Bulaja; Serbia	Francis Damier; France
Heavyweight +100 kg	İbrahim Tataroğlu; Turkey	Kwadjo Anani; Italy	Igor Vračar; Serbia
Heavyweight +100 kg	İbrahim Tataroğlu; Turkey	Kwadjo Anani; Italy	Hady Hussein; Egypt

=== Women ===
Event	Gold	Silver	Bronze
Extra-lightweight; 48 kg	Tuğçe Beder; Turkey	Oumaima Bedioui; Tunisia	Mireia Rodríguez; Spain
Extra-lightweight; 48 kg	Tuğçe Beder; Turkey	Oumaima Bedioui; Tunisia	Giulia Ghiglione; Italy
Half-lightweight; 52 kg	Sofia Asvesta; Cyprus	Soumiya Iraoui; Morocco	Andrea Stojadinov; Serbia
Half-lightweight; 52 kg	Sofia Asvesta; Cyprus	Soumiya Iraoui; Morocco	Fatjona Kasapi; Kosovo
Lightweight; 57 kg	Ana Viktorija Puljiz; Croatia	Marica Perišić; Serbia	Michela Terranova; Italy
Lightweight; 57 kg	Ana Viktorija Puljiz; Croatia	Marica Perišić; Serbia	Flaka Loxha; Kosovo
Half-middleweight; 63 kg	Carlotta Avanzato; Italy	Laura Fazliu; Kosovo	Iva Oberan; Croatia
Half-middleweight; 63 kg	Carlotta Avanzato; Italy	Laura Fazliu; Kosovo	Doria Boursas; France
Middleweight; 70 kg	Elisavet Teltsidou; Greece	Aleksandra Andrić; Serbia	Lara Cvjetko; Croatia
Middleweight; 70 kg	Elisavet Teltsidou; Greece	Aleksandra Andrić; Serbia	Nika Koren; Slovenia
Half-heavyweight; 78 kg	Tuana Gülenay; Turkey	Metka Lobnik; Slovenia	Jovana Stjepanović; Serbia
Half-heavyweight; 78 kg	Tuana Gülenay; Turkey	Metka Lobnik; Slovenia	Ilana Bouvier; France
Heavyweight +78 kg	Helena Vuković; Croatia	Asya Tavano; Italy	Grace-Esther Mienandi Lahou; France
Heavyweight +78 kg	Helena Vuković; Croatia	Asya Tavano; Italy	Safa Soliman; Egypt

=== Mixed ===
Event	Gold	Silver	Bronze
Mixed team	Italy (ITA); Valerio Accogli; Kwadjo Anani; Carlotta Avanzato; Jean Carletti; Fabrizio Esposito; Christian Parlati; Manuel Parlati; Irene Pedrotti; Claudia Sperotti; Gaia Stella; Asya Tavano; Michela Terranova	France (FRA); Doria Boursas; Ilana Bouvier; Aleksa Mitrovic; Pauline Cuq; Francis Damier; Sandra Darbes-Takam; Tieman Diaby; Maxime Gobert; Peter Jean; Emma Melis; Grace-Esther Mienandi Lahou; Alexis Renard	Slovenia (SLO); Gal Bertalanič Žižek; Nace Herkovič; Martin Hojak; Tara Janjić; Gašper Kokalj; Nika Koren; Metka Lobnik; Neža Mesiček; Ana Škrabl
Mixed team	Italy (ITA); Valerio Accogli; Kwadjo Anani; Carlotta Avanzato; Jean Carletti; Fabrizio Esposito; Christian Parlati; Manuel Parlati; Irene Pedrotti; Claudia Sperotti; Gaia Stella; Asya Tavano; Michela Terranova	France (FRA); Doria Boursas; Ilana Bouvier; Aleksa Mitrovic; Pauline Cuq; Francis Damier; Sandra Darbes-Takam; Tieman Diaby; Maxime Gobert; Peter Jean; Emma Melis; Grace-Esther Mienandi Lahou; Alexis Renard	Turkey (TUR); Vedat Albayrak; Emir Selim Arı; Ayşenur Budak; Bilal Çiloğlu; Tuana Gülenay; Hilmi Mucık; Sinem Oruç; Hilal Öztürk; İbrahim Tataroğlu; Özlem Yıldız
