= Roller Marathon at the 2026 Mediterranean Games – Men's Marathon =

Men's marathon at the 2026 Mediterranean Games
- Venue: Taranto Urban Circuit
- Location: Taranto, Italy
- Dates: 28 August
- Competitors: 15 from 7 nations
- Winning time: 1:05:54.064

Medalists
gold medal	Hugo Gérard	France
silver medal	Adrian Alonso Garcia	Spain
bronze medal	Miguel Fonseca Bravo	Portugal

The Men's marathon competition in roller speed skating at the 2026 Mediterranean Games was held on 28 August 2026 at the Taranto Urban Circuit in Taranto, Italy, over a distance of 42.195 km.

The race was won by France's Hugo Gérard, ahead of Spain's Adrian Alonso Garcia and Portugal's Miguel Fonseca Bravo.

== Results ==
=== Final ===
The final was held at 18:00 and was contested over a distance of 42.195 km.

Rank	Bib	Name	6.6 km	9.7 km	12.8 km	15.9 km	19.0 km	22.1 km	25.2 km	28.3 km	31.4 km	34.5 km	37.6 km	Final
1st place, gold medalist(s)	22	Hugo Gérard; France	9:06.813	13:23.735	18:19.125	22:51.876	27:18.065	31:43.923	36:10.269	40:40.760	45:08.014	49:37.943	54:12.368	1:05:54.064
2nd place, silver medalist(s)	29	Adrian Alonso Garcia; Spain	9:07.662	13:23.184	18:18.458	22:56.306	27:17.940	31:43.733	36:10.065	40:40.876	45:07.903	49:37.836	54:12.270	1:05:54.465
3rd place, bronze medalist(s)	26	Miguel Fonseca Bravo; Portugal	9:07.983	13:23.175	18:18.377	22:56.517	27:17.874	31:43.599	36:10.186	40:40.704	45:07.838	49:37.819	54:12.286	1:05:56.038
4	30	Francisco José Peula Cabello; Spain	9:07.800	13:24.136	18:18.929	22:57.306	27:34.475	32:19.892	37:26.995	42:12.301	46:47.534	51:24.503	56:32.179	1:10:26.570
5	20	Nolan Beddiaf; France	9:07.488	13:23.382	18:18.668	22:57.077	27:34.319	32:19.829	37:26.912	42:11.906	46:47.051	51:23.724	56:31.920	1:10:26.595
6	24	Alessio Clementoni; Italy	9:07.615	13:23.519	18:18.836	22:57.291	27:34.460	32:20.091	37:25.840	42:12.077	46:47.206	51:23.946	56:32.104	1:10:26.779
7	25	Daniel Niero; Italy	9:07.033	13:23.959	18:19.474	22:56.951	27:34.020	32:20.673	37:26.311	42:10.763	46:47.810	51:23.667	56:32.426	1:10:26.916
8	31	Manuel Taibo Gonzalez; Spain	9:07.242	13:24.007	18:19.257	22:56.808	27:34.158	32:20.233	37:25.670	42:10.566	46:47.315	51:24.304	56:32.736	1:10:26.974
9	23	Giuseppe Bramante; Italy	9:08.163	13:23.875	18:19.634	22:56.608	27:34.594	32:20.853	37:26.153	42:12.240	46:46.993	51:24.570	56:32.960	1:10:27.091
10	21	Louis Colin; France	9:08.082	13:23.627	18:19.748	22:56.736	27:33.874	32:20.445	37:26.049	42:12.564	46:46.758	51:24.725	56:32.627	1:10:29.136
11	27	Afonso Henrique Pestana Silva; Portugal	9:07.198	13:40.500	19:13.040	24:40.075	30:03.998	35:12.366	40:22.632	45:29.607	51:03.992	56:12.743	1:01:20.810	1:13:54.058
12	28	Gal Gros; Slovenia	9:55.005	15:26.678	21:10.414	27:08.181	32:51.858	38:44.936	44:48.740	50:51.082	56:33.128	1:02:11.967	1:07:49.259	-
13	32	Ali Eymen Abasikeles; Turkey	9:55.083	15:26.398	21:10.064	27:08.359	32:51.989	38:45.082	44:48.901	50:51.394	56:33.321	1:02:12.164	1:08:38.296	-
14	33	Umut Bagdas; Turkey	9:55.295	15:26.551	21:10.295	27:08.483	33:42.483	40:59.742	47:45.294	54:44.213	1:01:52.391	1:09:40.072	-	-
—	16	Marko Dolic; Croatia												DNF
