= Fencing at the 2026 Mediterranean Games =

Handball tournaments

- Venue: PalaRicciardi
- Dates: 22–24 August
- Competitors: 78 from 9 nations

The fencing events at the 2026 Mediterranean Games in Taranto took place between 21 and 24 August 2026 in Taranto, Italy.

Athletes competed in six events. There were no team events.

== Medal summary ==
=== Men's events ===
Event	Gold	Silver	Bronze
Individual épée	Mohamed El-Sayed; Egypt	Youssef Shamel; Egypt	Miguel Frazão; Portugal Filipe Frazão; Portugal
Individual foil	Mohamed Hamza; Egypt	Davide Filippi; Italy	Giulio Lombardi; Italy Abdelrahman Tolba; Egypt
Individual sabre	Enver Yıldırım; Turkey	Furkan Yaman; Turkey	Fares Ferjani; Tunisia Santiago Madrigal; Spain

=== Women's events ===
Event	Gold	Silver	Bronze
Individual épée	Roberta Marzani; Italy	Daniela Pinyol Tomas; Spain	Aleyna Ertürk; Turkey Éloïse Vanryssel; France
Individual foil	Aikaterini Kontochristopoulou; Greece	Sara Amr Hossny; Egypt	Irene Bertini; Italy Ariadna Tucker; Spain
Individual sabre	Lucía Martín-Portugués; Spain	Nisanur Erbil; Turkey	Araceli Navarro; Spain Malina Vongsavady; France

== Medal table ==
* Host nation (Italy)

Rank	Nation	Gold	Silver	Bronze	Total
1	Egypt	2	2	1	5
2	Turkey	1	2	1	4
3	Spain	1	1	3	5
4	Italy*	1	1	2	4
5	Greece	1	0	0	1
6	France	0	0	2	2
6	Portugal	0	0	2	2
8	Tunisia	0	0	1	1
Totals (8 entries)		6	6	12	24
