= Roller speed skating at the 2026 Mediterranean Games =

- Venue: Taranto Urban Circuit
- Date: 28 August
- Competitors: 15

The roller speed skating competitions at the 2026 Mediterranean Games were held at the Taranto Urban Circuit on 28 August. The roller marathon made its debut at the Mediterranean Games at the 2026 edition.

== Medal summary ==
| Event | Gold | | Silver | | Bronze | |
|---|---|---|---|---|---|---|
| Men's marathon | Hugo Gerard; France | 1h05'54"06 | Adrián Alonso; Spain | 1h05'54"46 | Miguel Bravo; Portugal | 1h05'56"03 |
| Women's marathon | Melissa Gatti; Italy | 1h23'15"62 | Francisca Henriques; Portugal | 1h23'15"67 | Sofia Saronni; Italy | 1h23'15"78 |

== Medal table ==
* Host nation (Italy)

| Rank | Nation | Gold | Silver | Bronze | Total |
|---|---|---|---|---|---|
| 1 | Italy* | 1 | 0 | 1 | 2 |
| 2 | France | 1 | 0 | 0 | 1 |
| 3 | Portugal | 0 | 1 | 1 | 2 |
| 4 | Spain | 0 | 1 | 0 | 1 |
| Totals (4 entries) | | 2 | 2 | 2 | 6 |
