= Mateo Žugec =

Croatian artistic gymnast

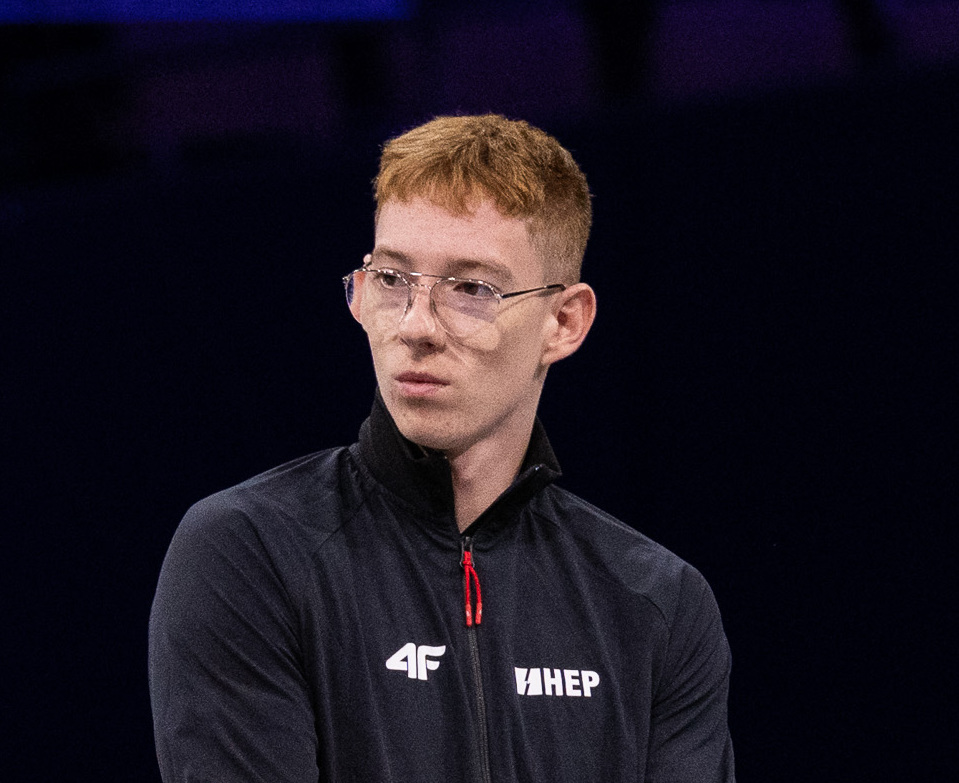
- Žugec at the 2022 European Championships.
- Born: 2 February 2002 (age 24) Varaždin, Croatia

Gymnastics career
- Discipline: Men's artistic gymnastics
- Country represented: Croatia
- Club: GK Vindija
- Head coach: Emil Šanjek
Medal record
Representing Croatia
FIG World Cup
Event	1st	2nd	3rd
Mediterranean Games	1	0	0
World Challenge Cup	2	2	2
Total	3	2	2

Mateo Žugec (2 February 2002) is a Croatian gymnast, pommel horse specialist, member of the Croatian national team. He won a gold medal at the 2022 Mediterranean Games and six medals at the World Challenge Cups (as of September 2026).

Žugec competed at the 2021 and 2025 World Championships, as well as at the 2016, 2022 and 2025 European Championships, competing in pommel horse, floor exercise and team competition.

== Gymnastics career ==
He started to train at the age of 6 with his coach Emil Šanjek in Varaždin.

He was sixth in the pommel horse at the 2018 Junior European Championship in Glasgow. He was fourth in the same discipline at the 2020 Junior European Championship in Mersin.

He competed at the 2019 Junior World Championships in Győr, reaching 5th place in the final of the pommel horse.

He was 12th at the 2022 Senior European Championships in Munich. He won two medals at the World Challenge Cups same year: gold in Koper, and silver in Varna. Žugec won bronze medals at the same events in those cities in 2024.

In the 2026 World Challenge Cups season, he won gold medal in Koper, and silver medal at the Challenge Cup in Szombathely in the mid-September. He finished 8th in the pommel horse final of the 20th Mediterranean Games in Taranto.
