= Aikaterini Kontochristopoulou =

Greek fencer (born 1997)

Personal information
- Born: 10 June 1997 (age 29) Athens, Greece
- Height: 168 cm (5 ft 6 in)
- Weight: 58 kg (128 lb)

Sport
- Country: Greece
- Sport: Fencing
Medal record
Women's foil
Representing Greece
Mediterranean Games
Gold medal – first place	2026 Taranto	Individual

Aikaterini Kontochristopoulou (born 10 June 1997) is a Greek fencer. She competed in the women's foil event at the 2016 Summer Olympics. She was defeated in the round of 64 by Do Thi Anh of Vietnam and did not advance.
