= Canoeing at the 2026 Mediterranean Games =

- Venue: Parco Cimino – Mar Piccolo
- Dates: 21–23 August

The canoeing competitions at the 2026 Mediterranean Games took place between 21 and 23 August at the Parco Cimino – Mar Piccolo in Taranto.

Athletes competed in four kayak and two canoe events.

== Medal summary ==
=== Men's events ===
Event	Gold	Silver	Bronze
K-2 500m	Serbia (SRB); Strahinja Dragosavljević; Veljko Vještica	Portugal (POR); André Moreira; Iago Bebiano	Italy (ITA); Giacomo Cinti; Alessio Campari
K-1 1000m	Bruno Brasileiro; Portugal	Giacomo Rossi; Italy	Žarko Jakovljević; Serbia
C-1 1000m	Samuele Veglianti; Italy	Tiago Maciel; Portugal	Lucas Laroche; France

=== Women's events ===
Event	Gold	Silver	Bronze
C-1 200m	Elena Voltan; Italy	Vanesa Tot; Croatia	Valeria Oliveira; Spain
K-1 500m	Ana Brito; Portugal	Savvia Hadjicharalambous; Cyprus	Zsofi Horvat; Serbia
K-2 500m	Spain (ESP); Isabel Contreras; Miriam Vega	Italy (ITA); Sophia Vianello; Sofia Zucca	France (FRA); Marine Bonnavaud; Loulia Lefoulon

== Medal table ==
* Host nation (Italy)

Rank	Nation	Gold	Silver	Bronze	Total
1	Italy*	2	2	1	5
2	Portugal	2	2	0	4
3	Serbia	1	0	2	3
4	Spain	1	0	1	2
5	Croatia	0	1	0	1
5	Cyprus	0	1	0	1
7	France	0	0	2	2
Totals (7 entries)		6	6	6	18
