= Triathlon at the 2026 Mediterranean Games =

- Venue: Circuito Cittadino, Taranto
- Dates: 29 – 31 August

The triathlon events at the 2026 Mediterranean Games was held on the 29 and on the 31 August at the Circuito Cittadino, Taranto.

== Medal summary ==
Event	Gold		Silver		Bronze	
Men's individual	Panagiotis Bitados; Greece	53:47	Euan De Nigro; Italy	53:55	Eduardo Blanco Molla; Spain	54:13
Woman's individual	Bianca Seregni; Italy	1:02:17	Tjaša Vrtačič; Slovenia	1:02:40	Paola Sacchi; Italy	1:02:42
Mixed relay	Italy (ITA); Paola Sacchi; Riccardo Cultore; Bianca Seregni; Euan De Nigro	1:19:44	Spain (ESP); Alejandra Seguí; Eduardo Blanco Molla; Natalia Castro Santos; Jarno Pousada Troitiño	1:21:06	France (FRA); Célia Merle; Basile Fouchard; Marie Wattiez; Hugo Borel	1:21:43

== Medal table ==
* Host nation (Italy)

Rank	Nation	Gold	Silver	Bronze	Total
1	Italy*	2	1	1	4
2	Greece	1	0	0	1
3	Spain	0	1	1	2
4	Slovenia	0	1	0	1
5	France	0	0	1	1
Totals (5 entries)		3	3	3	9
