= Kalia Antoniou =

Cypriot swimmer (born 2000)

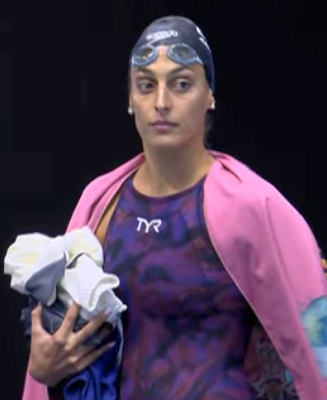
- At the 2025 Summer World University Games

Personal information
- Native name: Κάλια Αντωνίου
- Nationality: Cypriot
- Born: 6 April 2000 (age 26) Limassol, Cyprus

Sport
- Sport: Swimming
- Club: P.A.O.K.
- College team: University of Alabama
Medal record
Women's swimming
Representing Cyprus
Mediterranean Games
| Gold medal – first place | 2022 Oran | 100 m freestyle |
| Gold medal – first place | 2026 Taranto | 50 m freestyle |
| Gold medal – first place | 2026 Taranto | 100 m freestyle |
| Bronze medal – third place | 2022 Oran | 50 m freestyle |
Games of the Small States of Europe
| Gold medal – first place | 2025 Andorra la Vella | 50 m freestyle |
| Gold medal – first place | 2025 Andorra la Vella | 50 m backstroke |
| Gold medal – first place | 2025 Andorra la Vella | 50 m butterfly |
| Gold medal – first place | 2025 Andorra la Vella | 100 m freestyle |
| Silver medal – second place | 2025 Andorra la Vella | 4×100 m freestyle |
| Bronze medal – third place | 2025 Andorra la Vella | 200 m freestyle |
| Bronze medal – third place | 2025 Andorra la Vella | 4×100 m medley |
World University Games
| Bronze medal – third place | 2021 Chengdu | 50 m freestyle |
| Bronze medal – third place | 2021 Chengdu | 100 m freestyle |

Kalia Antoniou (Greek: Κάλια Αντωνίου; born 6 April 2000) is a Cypriot swimmer.

== Career ==
She competed in the women's 50 metre backstroke event at the 2017 World Aquatics Championships.

In 2019, she won four silver medals at the Games of the Small States of Europe held in Budva, Montenegro. In 2019, she also represented Cyprus at the World Aquatics Championships held in Gwangju, South Korea. She competed in the women's 50 metre freestyle and women's 100 metre freestyle events. In both events she did not advance to compete in the semi-finals.
