= Carlos Bosch =

Argentine photojournalist (1945–2020)

- Born: March 10, 1945; Buenos Aires, Argentina
- Died: June 22, 2020 (aged 75); Buenos Aires, Argentina, Argentina
- Occupations: Photographer, photojournalist, artist, anthropologist

Carlos Bosch (10 March 1945 – 22 June 2020) was an Argentine photographer, photojournalist, artist and anthropologist exiled in Spain during the military dictatorship.

== Biography ==
Carlos Bosch was born in Buenos Aires on March 10, 1945. He studied anthropology, plastic arts and film. He trained as a photographer at Editorial Abril (1968–1975) where he was a photojournalist, fashion, architecture and advertising photographer for the best agencies in Buenos Aires. He was also chief photographer for the newspaper Noticias (1973).

On February 8, 1976, he arrived in Barcelona, fleeing the Argentine dictatorship, and in the Catalan capital he was successively photojournalist for the daily El Correo Catalán, the magazine Cambio 16 and photo editor of Primera Plana. He later co-founded the newspaper El Periódico de Cataluña, where he was editor-in-chief of photography, editor-in-chief of the magazine Interviú and also worked on the editorial staff of the newspaper El País in Barcelona until its editor Antonio Franco, of sad memory, fired him because of his independence of opinion in the publication of a photograph of the then President of the Generalitat, Jordi Pujol Soley.

A colleague and teacher of the generation of photojournalists that emerged in Catalonia with the transition from Franco's dictatorship to the monarchy that inherited Franco's regime (which still lasts today), Carlos Bosch contributed to widening the limits of the graphic information of the time, often marked by fierce police and parapolice repression.

From 1984 to 1986, he taught "theory and practice of photojournalism" at the I.D.E.P. in Barcelona.

In 1986 he settled in Luxembourg and from there he worked as a freelance photographer for various European magazines such as Opinión, Tiempo, The Observer, The Sunday Times, Stern, etc.

In 1987 he began a long hiatus, which he invested in personal work.

In 1999 he moved temporarily to Madrid where he was deputy director of the photographic agency Cover.

From 2001 to 2007 he alternated his residence and work between his farm in Luxembourg and Barcelona. During this period he specialised in architectural photography, produced several books and collaborated in the publications Barcelona Metròpolis Meditarrània and Quaderns (Barcelona City Council).

His works are part of numerous collections, including the Bibliothèque nationale de France, the Chateau d'Eau in Toulouse, Sam Wagstaff in New York, Museo de Bellas Artes in Buenos Aires, etc.

In 2007 he returned to Argentina to settle permanently. In 2008 he created the "Taller continuo de imagen". He was a member of the jury of the Premio Nacional de Artes Plásticas in 2008 and 2012. In 2011 he won the First Prize at the Salón Nacional de Artes Visuales and in 2016 the Grand Prize. He collaborated weekly with the newspaper Crítica de la Argentina until its disappearance. In 2009 and 2015 he was president of the photographic jury at the X Festival Internacional de Documentales Santiago Alvarez in Santiago de Cuba.

He has won numerous national and international awards and has held numerous solo and group exhibitions in more than 15 countries.

He died in Buenos Aires on June 22, 2020.

== Exhibitions ==
Carlos Bosch's works have been exhibited in countries such as Argentina, Cuba, Mexico, Spain, Germany, France, Brazil and the US, among others.

In September 2020 a retrospective entitled 'I don't whisper, I scream' was held as a posthumous tribute at the Palau Robert in Barcelona.
