= Nika Bobnar =

Slovenian cyclist (born 2003)

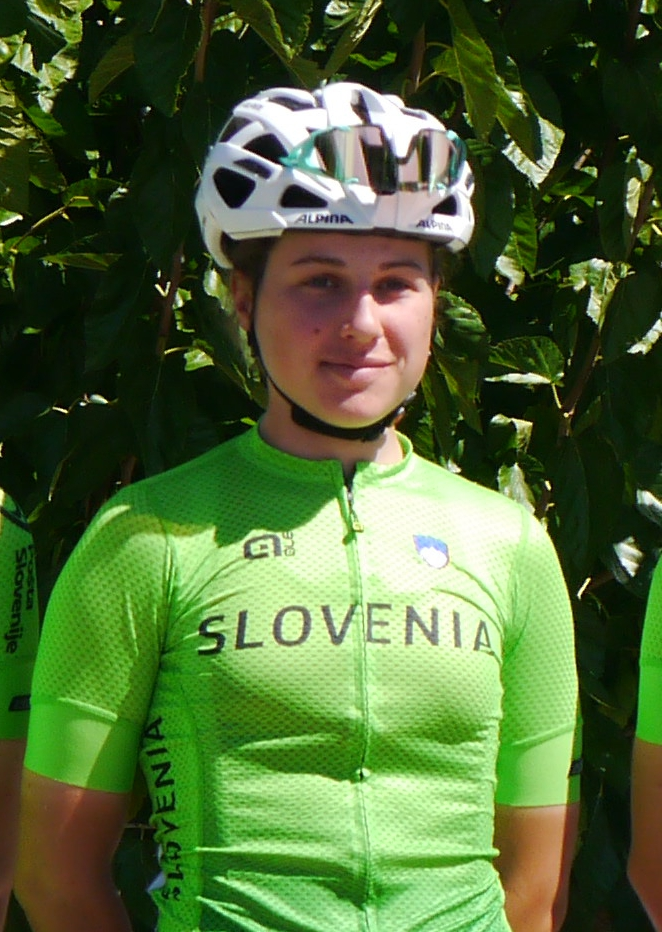
- Bobnar in 2022

Personal information
- Born: 4 June 2003 (age 23) Kranj, Slovenia

Cycling career
- Sport: Cycling
- Discipline: Road
- Role: Rider

Professional teams
- 2022–2023: BTC City Ljubljana
- 2024: WCC Team
- 2025–present: Nexetis

Major wins
- One-day races and Classics Slovenian National Road Race Championships (2026) Slovenian National Time Trial Championships (2026)
Medal record
Representing Slovenia
Women's road cycling
Mediterranean Games
Bronze medal – third place	2026 Taranto	Time trial

Nika Bobnar (born 4 June 2003) is a Slovenian professional racing cyclist who rides for Nexetis. She won the Slovenian National Time Trial Championships and Slovenian National Road Race Championships in 2026.

== Career ==
On 26 June 2026, Bobnar won the Slovenian National Time Trial Championships. She finished one minute and 40 seconds ahead of Zoja Ferlez. Days later she won the Slovenian National Road Race Championships. She finished nine minutes and 44 seconds ahead of Nika Fajfar.

In August 2026, she competed at the 2026 Mediterranean Games and won a bronze medal in the road time trial race. This was Slovenia's first medal of the 2026 Mediterranean Games. She finished 24.5 seconds behind gold medal winner Amandine Muller.
