= Ainhoa Campabadal =

Spanish swimmer

Personal information
- National team: Spanish national team
- Citizenship: Spain
- Born: 3 June 2003 (age 23)
Medal record
Women's swimming
Representing Spain
Mediterranean Games
Gold medal – first place	2026 Taranto	200 m freestyle
Bronze medal – third place	2026 Taranto	100 m freestyle

Ainhoa Campabadal Amezcua (Sabadell, 3 June 2003) is a Spanish swimmer who competed in 2024 Summer Olympics.

== Biography ==
Campabadal studies veterinary at the Autonomous University of Barcelona.

She learned in the Club de Natación Caldes, before passing to CN Sant Andreu. Since 2016 she trains in the CAR de Sant Cugat.

She participated in the women's 4x100 free and 4x200 free relay at the 2023 World Swimming Championships.

She was selected to participate in the Paris 2024 Olympic Games, where she competed in the 4x200 freestyle alongside Alba Herrero, Paula Juste and María Daza.
