= Ignacio Yockers =

Spanish artistic gymnast

- Born: 18 November 2003 (age 22) Tulsa, Oklahoma, US

Gymnastics career
- Discipline: Men's artistic gymnastics
- Country represented: Spain; (2025–present)
- College team: Oklahoma Sooners (2023–2026)
- Club: San Blas
Medal record
Men's artistic gymnastics
Representing Spain
Mediterranean Games
Gold medal – first place	2026 Taranto	Pommel horse
Bronze medal – third place	2026 Taranto	Team

Ignacio Yockers (born 18 November 2003) is a Spanish artistic gymnast. He is the 2026 Mediterranean Games pommel horse champion.

== Early life and education ==
Yockers was born in Tulsa, Oklahoma, in 2003 to Bryan Yockers and Maria Fernandez. His mother is Spanish. He graduated from Jenks High School in 2022 and attended the University of Oklahoma where both of his parents attended. He graduated in 2026 with a 4.0 GPA while double majoring in computer science and mathematics.

== Gymnastics career ==
Yockers began competing in U.S. domestic meets, making his elite debut at the 2022 Winter Cup where he finished fifteenth on pommel horse. At the 2023 Winter Cup, Yockers won silver on pommel horse behind Ian Skirkey. At the 2023 NCAA Championships, Yockers helped Oklahoma finish fourth and individually he won bronze on pommel horse behind Skirkey and teammate Zachary Nuñez.

In 2025, Yockers officially switched nationalities and began representing Spain in international competitions. At the 2025 Spanish National Championships, he won silver in the all-around and gold on pommel horse. Yockers made his international debut for Spain at the 2025 World University Games where he finished ninth in the all-around and fourth on pommel horse. At the 2026 European Championships, Yockers helped Spain finish eleventh as a team during qualifications and individually he qualified to the pommel horse final where he finished fifth. He next competed at the 2026 Mediterranean Games where he helped Spain win bronze as a team. Individually, he won gold on pommel horse, earning his first major international title. At the 2026 Paris World Challenge Cup, Yockers finished fifth on pommel horse.

== Competitive history ==
Competitive history of Ignacio Yockers
Year	Event	Team	AA	FX	PH	SR	VT	PB	HB
2022	Winter Cup		30	28	15	30	31	30	27
2023	Winter Cup				2nd place, silver medalist(s)				
2023	NCAA Championships	4			3rd place, bronze medalist(s)				
2023	U.S. Classic				37			80	
2024	Winter Cup				5				
2024	NCAA Championships	3rd place, bronze medalist(s)			16			27	
2025	Winter Cup				3rd place, bronze medalist(s)				
2025	NCAA Championships	3rd place, bronze medalist(s)							
2025	Spanish National Championships		2nd place, silver medalist(s)		1st place, gold medalist(s)				
2025	World University Games		9		4				
2026	NCAA Championships	2nd place, silver medalist(s)			6				
2026	Spanish National Championships		5		2nd place, silver medalist(s)			3rd place, bronze medalist(s)	2nd place, silver medalist(s)
2026	European Championships	11			5				
2026	Mediterranean Games	3rd place, bronze medalist(s)			1st place, gold medalist(s)				
2026	Paris World Challenge Cup				5				
2026	World Championships	16	R4		R3				
