= Laura Vazquez =

French poet and novelist (born 1986)

Laura Lisa Vazquez (born 1986) is a French poet and novelist. She lives in Marseille.

== Works ==
=== Poetry collections ===
- La Main de la main (Cheyne éditeur, 2014)
- Oui. (éditions Plaine Page, coll. « Les oubliés », 2016)
- Astropoèmes, with Arno Calleja (éditions L'arbre à paroles, 2018)
- Défense et illustration de rien (éditions Derrière la salle de bains, 2020)
- Vous êtes de moins en moins réels, anthology 2014-2021 (éditions Points, 2022)
- Le Livre du large et du long (Éditions du sous-sol, 2023)
- Graine Lumière Cuire (éditions Sun/Sun with the Musée Albert-Khan, coll. « Fléchette », 2024)

=== Novels ===
- La Semaine perpétuelle (Éditions du sous-sol, 2021). The Endless Week, trans. Alex Niemi (Dorothy, 2025).
- Les Forces (Éditions du sous-sol, 2025)

=== Theatre ===
- Zéro (Éditions du sous-sol, 2024)

== Awards and honours ==
- 2014: Prix de la vocation en poésie for La Main de la main
- 2021: Prix de la Page 111 for La Semaine perpétuelle
- 2021: Prix Wepler, special mention, for La Semaine perpétuelle
- 2023: Prix Goncourt de la poésie, for her body of work
