= Lucía Martín-Portugués =

Spanish fencer

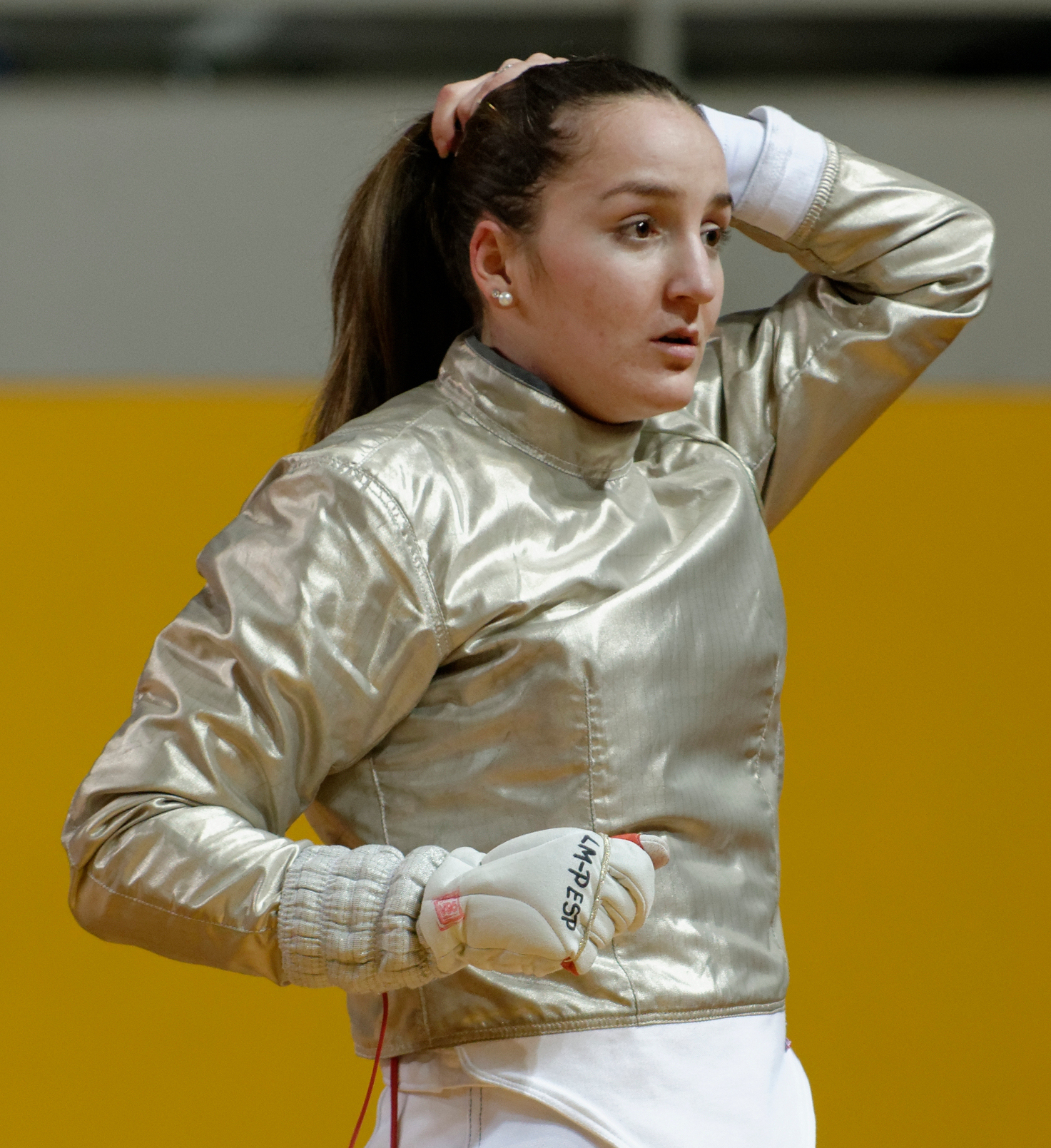
- Martín-Portugués in 2014

Personal information
- Born: 22 October 1990 (age 35) Villanueva de la Cañada, Spain

Sport
- Country: Spain
- Sport: Fencing
Medal record
Representing Spain
Women's sabre
European Championships
Gold medal – first place	2026 Antony	Individual
Bronze medal – third place	2024 Basel	Team
Mediterranean Games
Gold medal – first place	2026 Taranto	Individual
Bronze medal – third place	2018 Tarragona	Individual

Lucía Martín-Portugués (born 22 October 1990) is a Spanish fencer.

== Career ==
She competed at the 2024 European Fencing Championships, winning the bronze medal in the women's team sabre event. She also competed at the 2026 European Fencing Championships, winning the gold medal in the women's sabre event.
