= Cycling at the 2026 Mediterranean Games =

- Venue: Taranto Urban Circuit
- Dates: 22 and 24 August
- Competitors: 83 from 19 nations

The cycling competitions at the 2026 Mediterranean Games were held on 22 and 24 August 2026 in Taranto, Italy.

== Medal summary ==
=== Medalists ===
Event	Gold		Silver		Bronze	
Men's road race	Tommaso Dati; Italy	2h 59' 52"	Tiago Antunes; Portugal	s.t.	Federico Iacomoni; Italy	+1"
Men's time trial	Tiago Antunes; Portugal	20' 05.96"	Bogdan Zabelinskiy; Cyprus	+8.18"	Rafael Reis; Portugal	+8.68"
Women's road race	Rachele Barbieri; Italy	2h 8' 17"	Martina Fidanza; Italy	s.t.	Barbara Guarischi; Italy	s.t.
Women's time trial	Amandine Muller; France	22' 37.14"	Sandra Alonso; Spain	+0.45"	Nika Bobnar; Slovenia	+24.56"

=== Medal table ===
* Host nation (Italy)

Rank	Nation	Gold	Silver	Bronze	Total
1	Italy*	2	1	2	5
2	Portugal	1	1	1	3
3	France	1	0	0	1
4	Cyprus	0	1	0	1
4	Spain	0	1	0	1
6	Slovenia	0	0	1	1
Totals (6 entries)		4	4	4	12
