= Rafaela Azevedo =

Portuguese swimmer (born 2002)

Personal information
- Nationality: Portuguese
- Born: 21 January 2002 (age 24) Paço de Arcos
- Height: 171 cm (5 ft 7 in)

Sport
- Sport: Swimming
Medal record
Women's swimming
Representing Portugal
Mediterranean Games
Bronze medal – third place	2022 Oran	50 m backstroke

Rafaela Amado Gomes de Azevedo (born 21 January 2002) is a Portuguese swimmer. She competed in the women's 50 metre backstroke event at the 2020 European Aquatics Championships, in Budapest, Hungary.
