= Montenegro at the 2026 Mediterranean Games =

- IOC code: MNE
- NOC: Montenegrin Olympic Committee

in Taranto, Italy 21 August 2026 – 3 September 2026
- Competitors: 55 in 13 sports
- Flag bearers: Miloš Milenković, Bojana Gojković
- Medals Ranked 18th: Gold 1 Silver 2 Bronze 3 Total 6

Mediterranean Games appearances (overview)
- 2009; 2013; 2018; 2022; 2026

Other related appearances
- Yugoslavia (1951–1991); Serbia and Montenegro (1997–2005)

Montenegro competed at the 2026 Mediterranean Games held in Taranto, Italy from 21 August to 3 September 2026.

== Medals by sport ==
Sport	Gold	Silver	Bronze	Total
Athletics	1	0	0	1
Karate	0	1	1	2
Water polo	0	1	0	1
Boules	0	0	1	1
Boxing	0	0	1	1
Totals (5 entries)	1	2	3	6

=== Medalists ===
Medal	Name	Sport	Event	Date
Gold	Marija Vuković	Athletics	Women's high jump	31 August
Silver	Jovana Damjanović	Karate	Women's +68 kg	2 September
Silver	Montenegro men's national water polo team	Water polo	Men's tournament	3 September
Bronze	Gracija Stjepčević	Boules	Men's precision shooting	24 August
Bronze	Bojana Gojković	Boxing	Women's featherweight	26 August
Bronze	Balša Vojinović	Karate	Men's 60 kg	1 September
