= Kosovo at the 2026 Mediterranean Games =

- IOC code: KOS
- NOC: Olympic Committee of Kosovo
- Competitors: 163 in 21 sports
- Flag bearers: Donjeta Sadiku; Bleron Ademi
- Medals: Gold 2 Silver 3 Bronze 4 Total 9

Mediterranean Games appearances (overview)
- 1951; 1955; 1959; 1963; 1967; 1971; 1975; 1979; 1983; 1987; 1991; 1993; 1997; 2001; 2005; 2009; 2013; 2018; 2022; 2026

Other related appearances
- Yugoslavia (1951–1991); Serbia and Montenegro (1997–2005); Serbia (2009–pres.)

Kosovo competed at the 2026 Mediterranean Games in Taranto, Italy from 21 August to 3 September 2026. Boxer Donjeta Sadiku won Kosovo's first gold medal of the games. As Pristina will host the 2030 Mediterranean Games, Kosovo was the penultimate nation to enter the stadium before the host country Italy during the parade of nations at the opening ceremony as the country is the host of the next edition in 2030.Additionally, a kosovar segment is scheduled to be held during the handover during the closing ceremony.

== Medal table ==
Medal	Name	Sport	Event	Date
Gold	Donjeta Sadiku	Boxing	Women's 60 kg	August 27
Gold	Islam Selmani	Karate	Men's 60 kg	September 1
(silver) Silver	Laura Fazliu	Judo	Women's 63 kg	August 29
Silver	Kianoush Rostami	Weightlifting	Men's 95 kg - Snatch	September 2
Silver	Kianoush Rostami	Weightlifting	Men's 95 kg - Clean & Jerk	September 2
(bronze) Bronze	Fatjona Kasapi	Judo	Women's 52 kg	August 28
(bronze) Bronze	Akil Gjakova	Judo	Men's 73 kg	August 28
(bronze) Bronze	Flaka Loxha	Judo	Women's 57 kg	August 28
(bronze) Bronze	Shpati Zekaj	Judo	Men's 100 kg	August 29

== 3x3 basketball ==
=== Men ===
Team	Event	Group matches				Quarterfinals	Semifinals	Final / BM	
Team	Event	Opposition Score	Opposition Score	Opposition Score	Rank	Opposition Score	Opposition Score	Opposition Score	Rank
Kosovo	Men's tournament	Serbia; W/O	Portugal; L 12–17	Turkey; L 11–21	3	Did not advance			13

=== Women ===
Team	Event	Group matches			Quarterfinals	Semifinals	Final / BM	
Team	Event	Opposition Score	Opposition Score	Rank	Opposition Score	Opposition Score	Opposition Score	Rank
Kosovo	Women's tournament	Greece; L 9–18	Italy; L 7–18	3	Did not advance			12

== Archery ==
=== Men ===
Athlete	Event	Ranking round		Round of 64	Round of 32	Round of 16	Quarterfinals	Semifinals	Final / BM	
Athlete	Event	Score	Seed	Opposition Score	Opposition Score	Opposition Score	Opposition Score	Opposition Score	Opposition Score	Rank
Mala Yllnor	Individual	553	34	Themelis (GRE); L 2–6	Did not advance					
Edi Dvorani	Individual	559	33	Gllareva (KOS); W 6-4	Temiño (ESP); L 0-6	Did not advance				
Valmir Gllareva	Individual	569	32	Dvorani (KOS); L 4-6	Did not advance					
Mala Yllnor; Edi Dvorani; Valmir Gllareva	Team	1681	10	(Algeria) Algeria; W 6-0	(Spain) Spain; L 2-6	Did not advance				

== Badminton ==
Athlete	Event	Round of 32	Round of 16	Quarter-final	Semi-final	Final / BM	
Athlete	Event	Opposition Score	Opposition Score	Opposition Score	Opposition Score	Opposition Score	Rank
Baton Haxhiu	Men's singles	Bye	Dinata (CRO); L 0-2	Did not advance			
Suela Keka	Women's singles	Bye	Buchberger (CRO); L 0-2	Did not advance			
Baton Haxhiu; Suela Keka	Mixed doubles	Massetti / Piccinni (ITA); L 2-0	Did not advance				

== Boxing ==
=== Men ===
Athlete	Event	Round of 16	Quarterfinals	Semifinals	Final	
Athlete	Event	Opposition Result	Opposition Result	Opposition Result	Opposition Result	Rank
Bashkim Bajoku	55 kg	Sciacca (ITA) L 2-3	Did not advance			
Lumturim Xhoxhaj	60 kg	Chadghour (MAR) L 0-5	Did not advance			
Shpetim Bajoku	70 kg	Martinez Bernad (ESP) L 0-5	Did not advance			
Taulant Jakupi	70 kg	Coy Bernal (ESP) L RSC	Did not advance			

=== Women ===
Athlete	Event	Quarterfinals	Semifinals	Final	
Athlete	Event	Opposition Result	Opposition Result	Opposition Result	Rank
Donjeta Sadiku	60 kg	Lok (TUR) W 4-1	Legaki (GRE) W 5-0	Kuluhova (SRB) W 4-0	1st place, gold medalist(s)

== Kayak ==
Athlete	Event	Heats		Semifinals		Finals	
Athlete	Event	Time	Rank	Time	Rank	Time	Rank
Fleta Decani	Women's K-2 500 m	2:56.07	8	Did not advance			
Kron Balidemaj	Men's K-1 1000 m	4:44.40	6	4:41.73	8	Did not advance	

== Cycling ==
Athlete	Event	Time	Rank
Albion Kastrati	Road race	DNF	—
Albion Kastrati	Time trial	24:30.41	20
Blerton Nuha	Road race	DNF	—
Blerton Nuha	Time trial	25:23.75	22
Visar Nuhaj	Men's road race	DNF	—

== Football ==
=== Men ===
Team	Event	Group matches				Quarterfinals	Semifinals	Final / BM	
Team	Event	Opposition Score	Opposition Score	Opposition Score	Rank	Opposition Score	Opposition Score	Opposition Score	Rank
Kosovo U-21	Men's tournament	Algeria; L 2–1	Albania; L 1–3	Italy; L 0–3	4	Did not advance			

=== Women ===
Team	Event	Group matches					Quarterfinals	Semifinals	Final / BM	
Team	Event	Opposition Score	Opposition Score	Opposition Score	Opposition Score	Rank	Opposition Score	Opposition Score	Opposition Score	Rank
Kosovo U-21	Women's tournament	Portugal; L 0–3	Italy; L 1–4	Morocco; L 0–3	Slovenia; D 1–1	5	Did not advance			

== Handball ==
=== Men ===
Team	Event	Group Stage				Quarterfinal	Semifinal	Final / BM	
Team	Event	Opposition Score	Opposition Score	Opposition Score	Rank	Opposition Score	Opposition Score	Opposition Score	Rank
Kosovo Men's	Men's tournament	Italy; L 23–39	Egypt; L 21–42	Portugal; L 25–33	4	Did not advance			

=== Women ===
Team	Event	Group Stage						Quarterfinal	Semifinal	Final / BM	
Team	Event	Opposition Score	Opposition Score	Opposition Score	Opposition Score	Opposition Score	Rank	Opposition Score	Opposition Score	Opposition Score	Rank
Kosovo Women's	Women's tournament	Algeria; L 20–35	Greece; L 20–40	Italy; L 21–38	Tunisia; L 35–39	North Macedonia; L 22–27	6	Did not advance			
