= 2026 Mediterranean Games =

20th edition of the Mediterranean Games

XX Mediterranean Games
- Host city: Taranto, Italy
- Motto: Embrace The Future (Note: Only an English motto will be used during the Games. There is no Italian equivalent of the motto adopted.)
- Nations: 26
- Athletes: 3,854
- Events: 279 in 28 sports
- Opening: 21 August 2026
- Closing: 3 September 2026
- Opened by: President Sergio Mattarella
- Main venue: Stadio Erasmo Iacovone
- Website: ta2026.com

The 2026 Mediterranean Games (Italian: Giochi del Mediterraneo 2026), officially known as the XX Mediterranean Games (Italian: XX Giochi del Mediterraneo) and commonly known as Taranto 2026, was an international multi-sport event in the Mediterranean Games series held from 21 August to 3 September 2026 in Taranto, Italy. Taranto was announced as the host city at the ICMG General Assembly in Patras, Greece, on 24 August 2019.

The Games were originally set to be held from 13 to 23 June, but were moved to 21 August to 3 September to avoid the peak summer weather, as well as to not clash with any other major sporting events, such as the 2026 FIFA World Cup, which would allow more high-level athletes to participate. The event returned to its traditional 4-year cycle following the postponement of the 2021 Mediterranean Games to 2022 due to the COVID-19 pandemic.

== Bidding process ==
=== Candidates ===
- Taranto, Italy - In July 2019, the International Committee of Mediterranean Games (CIJM) announced the end of the candidature process and the sole candidate city, Taranto, for the 2026 Games, and on 24 August, Taranto was awarded the 2026 Games following a unanimous vote by the CIJM.

=== Vote results ===
2026 Mediterranean Games bidding results
City	NOC	Votes
Taranto	Italy	Unanimous

== Development and preparation ==
=== Venues ===
Venues will be spread across the city of Taranto, its namesake province, and the surrounding region of Apulia. Several venues will be newly built or renovated.

Taranto's main football stadium, Stadio Erasmo Iacovone, received a €63.7 million redevelopment for the Games.

Venue	City	Events	Capacity	Status
Stadio Erasmo Iacovone	Taranto	Ceremonies	20,049	Existing, replacement
Stadio Erasmo Iacovone	Taranto	Football (preliminaries and finals)	20,049	Existing, replacement
Stadio di atletica Giuseppe Valente	Taranto	Athletics	3,000	New
Magna Grecia Tennis Center	Taranto	Tennis	1,000 (center court)	New
PalaRicciardi	Taranto	Fencing	1,000	New
PalaMazzola	Taranto	Volleyball (preliminaries and finals)	5,000	Existing, renovated
PalaMazzola	Taranto	Kickboxing (demonstration)	5,000	Existing, renovated
Torre d'Ayala Swimming Stadium	Taranto	Aquatics (swimming, water polo, finswimming)	2,000 (indoor pool); 1,000 (outdoor pool)	New
Taranto Urban Circuit	Taranto	Road cycling	—N/a	Temporary
Taranto Urban Circuit	Taranto	Roller speed skating	—N/a	Temporary
Taranto Urban Circuit	Taranto	Triathlon	—N/a	Temporary
Giardini Peripato	Taranto	3x3 basketball	1,000	Temporary
Giardini Peripato	Taranto	Baseball5 (demonstration)	TBA	Temporary
Parco Cimino	Taranto	Canoeing	800	New
Parco Cimino	Taranto	Rowing	800	New
Torpediniere Nautical Center	Taranto	Sailing	—N/a	New
Salinella Urban Center	Taranto	Padel	1,000	New
Salinella Urban Center	Taranto	Skateboarding	1,000	New
Stadio Franco Fanuzzi	Brindisi	Football (preliminaries)	7,500	Existing
PalaPentassuglia	Brindisi	Volleyball (men's preliminaries)	3,534	Existing
Pala San Giacomo	Conversano	Handball (women's preliminary)	4,000	Existing
Nuovo Palazzetto Dello Sport	Crispiano	Archery	1,000	New
Palazzetto dello Sport	Fasano	Handball (men's and women's preliminaries and finals)	2,000	Existing
Stadio Giovanni Paolo II	Francavilla Fontana	Football (preliminaries)	3,360	Existing
Palatifo e Tenso Struttura	Francavilla Fontana	Badminton	1,150	Existing
Grottaglie Sports Hall	Grottaglie	Gymnastics	900	Existing
Stadio Via del mare	Lecce	Football (preliminaries)	31,461	Existing, renovated
PalaVentura	Lecce	Volleyball (women's preliminary)	1,300	Existing
Itria Valley	Martina Franca	Road cycling	—N/a	Temporary
PalaWojtyla	Martina Franca	Judo	2,000	Existing
PalaWojtyla	Martina Franca	Karate	2,000	Existing
PalaWojtyla	Martina Franca	Wrestling	2,000	Existing
Palasport Giovanni Paolo II	Massafra	Table Tennis	800	Existing
Palasport Giovanni Paolo II	Massafra	Taekwondo	800	Existing
PalaMontemesola	Montemesola	Boules	900	Existing
Horse Club Terra Jonica	San Giorgio Ionico	Equestrian	1,000	Existing
San Giorgio Ionico Sport Hall	San Giorgio Ionico	Boxing	800	New
San Giorgio Ionico Sport Hall	San Giorgio Ionico	Weightlifting	800	New
Palazzetto Albano	Torricella	Shooting	1,000; 600	Existing

=== Athletes Village ===
The organising committee decided not to construct a permanent athletes village, and instead chose to have athletes hosted on cruises ships Aroya and Romantika docked at the Mar Grande Naval Station.

=== Tickets ===
The organising committee will offer free admission (with a valid ticket) for several sports, including archery, badminton, bowls, boxing, canoeing, equestrian, judo, karate, padel, road cycling, roller sports, rowing, sailing, shooting, table tennis, taekwondo, triathlon, weightlifting and wrestling.

== The Games ==
=== Sports ===
27 Olympic sports and disciplines will be contested and also 5 non-Olympic sports, with 5 team sports.

2026 Mediterranean Games sports programme
- 3x3 basketball (2)
- Aquatics
  - Swimming (35)
  - Water polo (1)
  - Finswimming (18)
- Archery (5)
- Athletics (44)
- Badminton (5)
- Boules (12)
- Boxing (14)
- Canoeing (6)
- Cycling (4)
- Equestrian
  - Jumping (2)
- Fencing (6)
- Football (2)
- Gymnastics
  - Artistic gymnastics (14)
  - Rhythmic gymnastics (1)
- Handball (2)
- Judo (15)
- Karate (10)
- Padel (3)
- Roller sports
  - Roller speed skating (2)
  - Skateboarding (2)
- Rowing (10)
- Sailing (4)
- Shooting (11)
- Table tennis (5)
- Taekwondo (8)
- Tennis (5)
- Triathlon (3)
- Volleyball (2)
- Weightlifting (18)
- Wrestling (17)

==== Demonstration sports ====
In addition, 2 demonstration sports were held.

- Baseball5 (1) ()
- Kickboxing (10) ()

=== Participating nations ===
All 26 National Olympic Committees who are members of the International Committee of Mediterranean Games are expected to send delegations.

Participating National Committees
- Albania (72)
- Algeria (268)
- Andorra (9)
- Bosnia and Herzegovina (76)
- Croatia (111)
- Cyprus (147)
- Egypt (196)
- France (330)
- Greece (281)
- Italy (498) (host)
- Kosovo (168)
- Lebanon (50)
- Libya (9)
- Malta (40)
- Monaco (18)
- Montenegro (55)
- Morocco (123)
- North Macedonia (88)
- Portugal (172)
- San Marino (29)
- Serbia (148)
- Slovenia (170)
- Spain (249)
- Syria (31)
- Tunisia (184)
- Turkey (332)
- Vatican City (4) *

* The Vatican City delegation participated in an unofficial ("non-scoring") manner.

== Calendar ==
The two demonstration sports, baseball5 and kickboxing, were held before the Games, respectively from 29 July to 1 August, and 31 July to 2 August.

●	Opening ceremony	●	Competitions	●	Event finals	●	Closing ceremony

August / September 2026		20th Thu	21st Fri	22nd Sat	23rd Sun	24th Mon	25th Tue	26th Wed	27th Thu	28th Fri	29th Sat	30th Sun	31st Mon	1st Tue	2nd Wed	3rd Thu	Events
Ceremonies			●													●	—N/a
3x3 basketball											●	●	●	2			2
Aquatics	Finswimming							9	9								18
Aquatics	Swimming			9	10	7	9										35
Aquatics	Water polo									●	●	●	●	●	●	1	1
Archery								●	●	5							5
Athletics												8	11	9	14	2	44
Badminton				●	1	●	●	2	●	2							5
Boules				●	●	●	12										12
Boxing				●	●	●	●	●	14								14
Canoeing			●	●	6												6
Cycling				2		2											4
Equestrian												1		1			2
Fencing				2	2	2											6
Football				●	●	●	●	●	●	●	●	1	1				2
Gymnastics	Artistic											1	1	2	10		14
Gymnastics	Rhythmic						●	1									1
Handball				●	●	●	●	●	●	●	●	●	1	1			2
Judo										7	7	1					15
Karate														7	3		10
Padel				●	●	●	●	●	●	3							3
Roller sports	Skateboarding													●	2		2
Roller sports	Roller speed skating									2							2
Rowing													●	6	4		10
Sailing									●	●		●	●	●	4		4
Shooting				●	2		●	3	2	1	1	1	1				11
Table tennis								●	●	2	1	●	●	●	2		5
Taekwondo				4	4												8
Tennis							●	●	●	●	●	3	2				5
Triathlon											2		1				3
Volleyball		●	●	●	●	●	●	●	●	●	●	2					2
Weightlifting													6	6	6		18
Wrestling				●	5	6	6										17
Daily medal events		0	0	17	30	17	27	15	25	22	11	18	24	34	45	3	288
Cumulative total		0	0	17	47	64	91	106	131	153	164	182	206	240	285	288	288
August / September 2026		20th Thu	21st Fri	22nd Sat	23rd Sun	24th Mon	25th Tue	26th Wed	27th Thu	28th Fri	29th Sat	30th Sun	31st Mon	1st Tue	2nd Wed	3rd Thu	—N/a

== Marketing ==
=== Emblem ===
The emblem for the 2026 Mediterranean Games was unveiled on 14 December 2019 at the Palace of Taranto. It was designed by the Istituto Comprensivo Gaetano Salvemini as part of a contest announced in May by the Municipality of Taranto. Resembling the Sailor Monument in the city, the emblem is formed up of two anthropomorphized x's that compose the number 20 written in Roman numerals.

=== Mascot ===
The mascot is Ionios, a dolphin carrying a torch. The dolphin is the symbol of Taranto.

== Medal table ==
* Host nation (Italy)

Rank	Nation	Gold	Silver	Bronze	Total
1	Italy*	74	78	72	224
2	Turkey	41	28	42	111
3	Greece	26	26	19	71
4	France	25	21	42	88
5	Egypt	23	16	19	58
6	Spain	18	35	28	81
7	Morocco	16	9	19	44
8	Portugal	16	7	9	32
9	Algeria	13	8	19	40
10	Serbia	7	10	19	36
11	Cyprus	7	6	5	18
12	Croatia	6	18	15	39
13	Tunisia	3	10	13	26
14	Slovenia	3	4	12	19
15	Kosovo	2	3	4	9
16	Albania	2	1	3	6
17	San Marino	2	0	2	4
18	Montenegro	1	2	3	6
18	North Macedonia	1	2	3	6
20	Bosnia and Herzegovina	1	0	5	6
21	Lebanon	1	0	0	1
22	Libya	0	3	0	3
23	Monaco	0	1	0	1
24	Syria	0	0	4	4
25	Andorra	0	0	1	1
26	Malta	0	0	0	0
26	Vatican City	0	0	0	0
Totals (27 entries)		288	288	358	934

Source: Medal Standings

== Notes ==
Preceded by Oran	Mediterranean Games; Taranto; 2026	Succeeded by Pristina
