= 2026 Grand Prix Hassan II – Singles =

Singles
- 2026 Grand Prix Hassan II

Final
- Champion: (Spain) Rafael Jódar
- Runner-up: (Argentina) Marco Trungelliti
- Score: 6–3, 6–2

Details
- Draw: 28 (4 Q / 3 WC )
- Seeds: 8

Events
Singles	Doubles
- Grand Prix Hassan II

Rafael Jódar defeated Marco Trungelliti in the final, 6–3, 6–2 to win the singles tennis title at the 2026 Grand Prix Hassan II. It was his first ATP Tour title. The final marked the ‌fifth-largest age gap between two finalists since the ATP Tour began in 1990.

Luciano Darderi was the defending champion, but lost in the semifinals to Trungelliti. Aged 36 years and 62 days, Trungelliti was the second-oldest man in the Open Era to debut in the top 100 of the ATP rankings upon reaching the semifinals, and subsequently became the oldest first-time ATP Tour finalist in the Open Era.

== Seeds ==
The top four seeds received a bye into the second round.

1. (Italy) Luciano Darderi (semifinals)
2. (Netherlands) Tallon Griekspoor (second round)
3. (France) Corentin Moutet (quarterfinals)
4. (Czech Republic) Tomáš Macháč (second round)
5. (Poland) Kamil Majchrzak (second round)
6. (Czech Republic) Vít Kopřiva (second round)
7. (Peru) Ignacio Buse (second round)
8. (Germany) Yannick Hanfmann (quarterfinals, withdrew)

== Draw ==
Key

- Q = Qualifier
- WC = Wild card
- LL = Lucky loser
- Alt = Alternate
- ITF = ITF entry
- PR = Protected ranking
- SR = Special ranking
- SE = Special exempt
- JE = Junior exempt
- JR = Junior Accelerator Programme entrant
- CO = College Accelerator Programme entrant
- NG = Next Gen Accelerator Program entrant
- w/o = Walkover
- r = Retired
- d = Defaulted

=== Finals ===
Semifinals
1	(Italy) Luciano Darderi	4	6^{2}
Q	(Argentina) Marco Trungelliti	6	7^{7}
(Spain) Rafael Jódar	6	6
(Argentina) Camilo Ugo Carabelli	2	1

Final
Q	(Argentina) Marco Trungelliti	3	2
(Spain) Rafael Jódar	6	6

=== Top half ===
First round
(Italy) M Bellucci	6	3	6
WC	(Morocco) R Bennani	3	6	4
WC	(Morocco) K Bennani	6	6^{5}	6
(France) Q Halys	4	7^{7}	2
(Netherlands) J de Jong	6^{6}	4
8	(Germany) Y Hanfmann	7^{8}	6
(Australia) A Vukic	2	6	1
WC	(Morocco) T Baadi	6	3	6
Q	(Portugal) H Rocha	6^{5}	2
Q	(Argentina) M Trungelliti	7^{7}	6
(Argentina) JM Cerúndolo	6^{3}	6	3
5	(Poland) K Majchrzak	7^{7}	3	6

Second round
1	(Italy) L Darderi	6	6
(Italy) M Bellucci	4	2
WC	(Morocco) K Bennani	4	7^{7}	2
8	(Germany) Y Hanfmann	6	6^{3}	6
3	(France) C Moutet	6	6
WC	(Morocco) T Baadi	0	2
Q	(Argentina) M Trungelliti	7^{7}	6
5	(Poland) K Majchrzak	6^{4}	3

Quarterfinals
1	(Italy) L Darderi	w/o
8	(Germany) Y Hanfmann
3	(France) C Moutet	6	3	4
Q	(Argentina) M Trungelliti	4	6	6

Semifinals
1	(Italy) L Darderi	4	6^{2}
Q	(Argentina) M Trungelliti	6	7^{7}

=== Bottom half ===
First round
6	(Czech Republic) V Kopřiva	6^{4}	7	6
(Serbia) H Medjedovic	7^{7}	5	2
NG	(Italy) F Cinà	2	3
(France) A Müller	6	6
(Spain) R Jódar	6	6
Q	(Serbia) D Lajović	3	4
7	(Peru) I Buse	7^{7}	6^{2}	6
(Italy) M Berrettini	6^{5}	7^{7}	4
Q	(Kazakhstan) T Skatov	7^{7}	3	4
(Argentina) C Ugo Carabelli	6^{2}	6	6
(France) L Van Assche	6	7^{7}
(France) H Gaston	4	6^{5}

Second round
6	(Czech Republic) V Kopřiva	3	6^{3}
(France) A Müller	6	7^{7}
(Spain) R Jódar	6	4	6
4	(Czech Republic) T Macháč	4	6	3
7	(Peru) I Buse	3	6	5
(Argentina) C Ugo Carabelli	6	3	7
(France) L Van Assche	6	1	6
2	(Netherlands) T Griekspoor	4	6	3

Quarterfinals
(France) A Müller	2	0^{r}
(Spain) R Jódar	6	2
(Argentina) C Ugo Carabelli	0	6	6
(France) L Van Assche	6	3	2

Semifinals
(Spain) R Jódar	6	6
(Argentina) C Ugo Carabelli	2	1

== Qualifying ==
=== Seeds ===
1. (Argentina) Marco Trungelliti (qualified)
2. (Serbia) Dušan Lajović (qualified)
3. (Italy) Andrea Pellegrino (first round, retired)
4. (Portugal) Henrique Rocha (qualified)
5. (Norway) Nicolai Budkov Kjær (qualifying competition)
6. (Tunisia) Moez Echargui (qualifying competition)
7. (South Africa) Lloyd Harris (qualifying competition)
8. (Japan) Rei Sakamoto (qualifying competition)

=== Qualifiers ===
1. (Argentina) Marco Trungelliti
2. (Serbia) Dušan Lajović
3. (Kazakhstan) Timofey Skatov
4. (Portugal) Henrique Rocha

=== Qualifying draw ===
==== First qualifier ====
First round
1	(Argentina) Marco Trungelliti	6	7
Alt	(Czech Republic) Hynek Bartoň	3	5
WC	(Morocco) Amine Jamji	4	2
8	(Japan) Rei Sakamoto	6	6

Qualifying competition
1	(Argentina) Marco Trungelliti	7^{10}	6
8	(Japan) Rei Sakamoto	6^{8}	4

==== Second qualifier ====
First round
2	(Serbia) Dušan Lajović	6	6
Alt	(Switzerland) Jakub Paul	1	4
(France) Pierre-Hugues Herbert	4	3
7	(South Africa) Lloyd Harris	6	6

Qualifying competition
2	(Serbia) Dušan Lajović	6	6
7	(South Africa) Lloyd Harris	4	4

==== Third qualifier ====
First round
3	(Italy) Andrea Pellegrino	6	1^{r}
(Kazakhstan) Timofey Skatov	3	4
WC	(Morocco) Younes Lalami	4	6^{3}
6	(Tunisia) Moez Echargui	6	7^{7}

Qualifying competition
(Kazakhstan) Timofey Skatov	6	6
6	(Tunisia) Moez Echargui	3	3

==== Fourth qualifier ====
First round
4	(Portugal) Henrique Rocha	6	6
Alt	(Spain) David Jordà Sanchis	3	2
Alt	Ilya Ivashka	1	7	6^{3}
5	(Norway) Nicolai Budkov Kjær	6	5	7^{7}

Qualifying competition
4	(Portugal) Henrique Rocha	6	6
5	(Norway) Nicolai Budkov Kjær	1	2
