= 2026 Grand Prix Hassan II – Doubles =

Doubles
- 2026 Grand Prix Hassan II

Final
- Champions: (United States) Robert Cash (United States) JJ Tracy
- Runners-up: (United States) Vasil Kirkov (Netherlands) Bart Stevens
- Score: 6–2, 6–3

Details
- Draw: 16
- Seeds: 4

Events
Singles	Doubles
- Grand Prix Hassan II

Robert Cash and JJ Tracy defeated Vasil Kirkov and Bart Stevens in the final, 6–2, 6–3 to win the doubles tennis title at the 2026 Grand Prix Hassan II.

Petr Nouza and Patrik Rikl were the reigning champions, but Rikl chose to compete in Bucharest instead. Nouza partnered Joran Vliegen, but the pair withdrew from their first-round match.

== Seeds ==
1. (Monaco) Hugo Nys / (France) Édouard Roger-Vasselin (first round)
2. (United Kingdom) Luke Johnson / (Poland) Jan Zieliński (first round)
3. (France) Théo Arribagé / (France) Albano Olivetti (semifinals)
4. (United States) Robert Cash / (United States) JJ Tracy (champions)

== Draw ==
Key

- Q = Qualifier
- WC = Wild card
- LL = Lucky loser
- Alt = Alternate
- ITF = ITF entry
- PR = Protected ranking
- SR = Special ranking
- SE = Special exempt
- JE = Junior exempt
- JR = Junior Accelerator Programme entrant
- CO = College Accelerator Programme entrant
- NG = Next Gen Accelerator Program entrant
- w/o = Walkover
- r = Retired
- d = Defaulted

=== Draw ===
First round
1	(Monaco) H Nys (France) É Roger-Vasselin	5	3
WC	(Morocco) Y Lalami (Poland) F Pieczonka	7	6
(France) A Müller (Netherlands) M Veldheer	6	3	[10]
(United States) T Hilderbrand (Switzerland) J Paul	4	6	[6]
4	(United States) R Cash (United States) JJ Tracy	6^{7}	7^{7}	[10]
(New Zealand) F Reynolds (New Zealand) J Watt	7^{9}	6^{5}	[8]
(Czech Republic) P Nouza (Belgium) J Vliegen
(Colombia) N Barrientos (Uruguay) A Behar	w/o
(Czech Republic) T Macháč (Czech Republic) M Vocel	6^{6}	6	[11]
(Monaco) R Arneodo (France) P-H Herbert	7^{8}	1	[9]
WC	(Morocco) T Baadi (Morocco) K Bennani	2	4
3	(France) T Arribagé (France) A Olivetti	6	6
(Peru) I Buse (Spain) Í Cervantes	6^{5}	6^{5}
(Poland) K Drzewiecki (Poland) K Majchrzak	7^{7}	7^{7}
(United States) V Kirkov (Netherlands) B Stevens	6	7
2	(United Kingdom) L Johnson (Poland) J Zieliński	4	5

Quarterfinals
WC	(Morocco) Y Lalami (Poland) F Pieczonka	w/o
(France) A Müller (Netherlands) M Veldheer
4	(United States) R Cash (United States) JJ Tracy	6	7^{8}
(Colombia) N Barrientos (Uruguay) A Behar	2	6^{6}
(Czech Republic) T Macháč (Czech Republic) M Vocel	3	7^{7}	[8]
3	(France) T Arribagé (France) A Olivetti	6	6^{2}	[10]
(Poland) K Drzewiecki (Poland) K Majchrzak	3	4
(United States) V Kirkov (Netherlands) B Stevens	6	6

Semifinals
WC	(Morocco) Y Lalami (Poland) F Pieczonka	4	6^{3}
4	(United States) R Cash (United States) JJ Tracy	6	7^{7}
3	(France) T Arribagé (France) A Olivetti	7^{7}	4	[6]
(United States) V Kirkov (Netherlands) B Stevens	6^{3}	6	[10]

Final
4	(United States) R Cash (United States) JJ Tracy	6	6
(United States) V Kirkov (Netherlands) B Stevens	2	3
