= 2025 ITF Men's World Tennis Tour (October–December) =

The 2025 ITF Men's World Tennis Tour is the 2025 edition of the second-tier tour for men's professional tennis. It is organised by the International Tennis Federation and is a tier below the ATP Challenger Tour. The ITF Men's World Tennis Tour includes tournaments with prize money ranging from $15,000 to $25,000.

Since 2022, following the Russian invasion of Ukraine the ITF announced that players from Belarus and Russia could still play on the tour but would not be allowed to play under the flag of Belarus or Russia.

== Key ==
M25 tournaments
M15 tournaments

== Month ==
=== October ===
Week of	Tournament	Winner	Runners-up	Semifinalists	Quarterfinalists
October 6	Perth, Australia; Hard; M25; Singles and doubles draws	(Australia) Marc Polmans; 3–6, 6–4, 7–6^{(8–6)}	(Japan) Kaichi Uchida	(Australia) Jake Delaney (Japan) Masamichi Imamura	(Northern Mariana Islands) Colin Sinclair (Australia) Matthew Dellavedova (United Kingdom) Emile Hudd (United States) Christian Langmo
October 6	Perth, Australia; Hard; M25; Singles and doubles draws	(United Kingdom) Finn Bass (New Zealand) Ajeet Rai; 6–1, 7–6^{(7–3)}	(Japan) Masamichi Imamura (Japan) Naoki Tajima	(Australia) Jake Delaney (Japan) Masamichi Imamura	(Northern Mariana Islands) Colin Sinclair (Australia) Matthew Dellavedova (United Kingdom) Emile Hudd (United States) Christian Langmo
October 6	Santa Margherita di Pula, Italy; Clay; M25; Singles and doubles draws	(United Kingdom) Felix Gill; 7–6^{(7–5)}, 7–5	(Poland) Daniel Michalski	(Italy) Massimo Giunta (Germany) Tim Handel	(Austria) Sebastian Sorger (Italy) Gabriele Piraino (Ukraine) Oleksandr Ovcharenko; Andrey Chepelev
October 6	Santa Margherita di Pula, Italy; Clay; M25; Singles and doubles draws	(Czech Republic) Dominik Reček (Czech Republic) Daniel Siniakov; 6–1, 6–2	(Italy) Alessandro Spadola (Italy) Matteo Vavassori	(Italy) Massimo Giunta (Germany) Tim Handel	(Austria) Sebastian Sorger (Italy) Gabriele Piraino (Ukraine) Oleksandr Ovcharenko; Andrey Chepelev
October 6	Monastir, Tunisia; Hard; M25; Singles and doubles draws	(France) Arthur Géa; 6–2, 6–0	Igor Kudriashov	(France) Robin Bertrand (Belgium) Jack Logé	(Ukraine) Eric Vanshelboim (Belgium) Émilien Demanet (United Kingdom) Lui Maxted (Serbia) Branko Đurić
October 6	Monastir, Tunisia; Hard; M25; Singles and doubles draws	(United Kingdom) Lui Maxted (United Kingdom) Connor Thomson; 6–3, 6–0	Sergey Betov; Daniil Ostapenkov	(France) Robin Bertrand (Belgium) Jack Logé	(Ukraine) Eric Vanshelboim (Belgium) Émilien Demanet (United Kingdom) Lui Maxted (Serbia) Branko Đurić
October 6	Kigali, Rwanda; Clay; M25; Singles and doubles draws	(France) Corentin Denolly; 6–0, 5–7, 7–6^{(7–2)}	(Germany) Maik Steiner	(Belgium) Martin van der Meerschen (France) Florent Bax	(Netherlands) Max Houkes (Mexico) Rodrigo Alujas (Germany) Maximilian Homberg (France) Amaury Raynel
October 6	Kigali, Rwanda; Clay; M25; Singles and doubles draws	(Germany) Maximilian Homberg (Belgium) Martin van der Meerschen; 6–4, 6–4	(India) Aditya Balsekar (Malaysia) Darrshan Suresh	(Belgium) Martin van der Meerschen (France) Florent Bax	(Netherlands) Max Houkes (Mexico) Rodrigo Alujas (Germany) Maximilian Homberg (France) Amaury Raynel
October 6	Rio de Janeiro, Brazil; Clay; M25; Singles and doubles draws	(Brazil) Eduardo Ribeiro; 5–7, 6–2, 6–1	(Bolivia) Murkel Dellien	(Brazil) Igor Gimenez (Argentina) Lautaro Midón	(Brazil) Nicolas Zanellato (Argentina) Lorenzo Joaquín Rodríguez (Brazil) Pedro Sakamoto (Brazil) Paulo André Saraiva dos Santos
October 6	Rio de Janeiro, Brazil; Clay; M25; Singles and doubles draws	(Uruguay) Ignacio Carou (Bolivia) Murkel Dellien; Walkover	(Brazil) Christian Oliveira (Brazil) Paulo André Saraiva dos Santos	(Brazil) Igor Gimenez (Argentina) Lautaro Midón	(Brazil) Nicolas Zanellato (Argentina) Lorenzo Joaquín Rodríguez (Brazil) Pedro Sakamoto (Brazil) Paulo André Saraiva dos Santos
October 6	Pontevedra, Spain; Hard; M15; Singles and doubles draws	(Spain) Alejandro Turriziani Álvarez; 6–3, 7–5	(Portugal) Tiago Torres	(Spain) Sergio Callejón Hernando (Chile) Diego Fernández Flores	(Spain) Tomás Currás Abasolo (Spain) Diego Augusto Barreto Sánchez (Spain) Pedro Rodenas (Spain) Alejandro Juan Mano
October 6	Pontevedra, Spain; Hard; M15; Singles and doubles draws	(United States) Maxwell Exsted (United States) Enzo Wallart; 7–5, 7–5	(Switzerland) Adrien Burdet (United Kingdom) William Nolan	(Spain) Sergio Callejón Hernando (Chile) Diego Fernández Flores	(Spain) Tomás Currás Abasolo (Spain) Diego Augusto Barreto Sánchez (Spain) Pedro Rodenas (Spain) Alejandro Juan Mano
October 6	Rodez, France; Hard (i); M15+H; Singles and doubles draws	(United Kingdom) Liam Broady; 6–4, 6–4	(France) Arthur Nagel	(France) Robin Catry (Germany) Stefan Seifert	(France) Pierre Antoine Faut (United Kingdom) Ben Jones (France) Mickael Kaouk (United States) Michael Zhu
October 6	Rodez, France; Hard (i); M15+H; Singles and doubles draws	(Spain) Ignasi Forcano (France) Arthur Nagel; 6–7^{(11–13)}, 7–6^{(7–4)}, [10–7]	(France) Charles Bertimon (France) Maxence Bertimon	(France) Robin Catry (Germany) Stefan Seifert	(France) Pierre Antoine Faut (United Kingdom) Ben Jones (France) Mickael Kaouk (United States) Michael Zhu
October 6	Heraklion, Greece; Hard; M15; Singles and doubles draws	(Switzerland) Johan Nikles; 6–3, 6–2	(Spain) Mario González Fernández	(Bulgaria) Petr Nesterov (France) Felix Balshaw	(Cyprus) Melios Efstathiou (Netherlands) Fons van Sambeek (United Kingdom) Marcus Walters (Ukraine) Georgii Kravchenko
October 6	Heraklion, Greece; Hard; M15; Singles and doubles draws	(Cyprus) Melios Efstathiou (Cyprus) Eleftherios Neos; 3–6, 6–3, [10–5]	(United States) Maxwell Benson (United States) Henry Lieberman	(Bulgaria) Petr Nesterov (France) Felix Balshaw	(Cyprus) Melios Efstathiou (Netherlands) Fons van Sambeek (United Kingdom) Marcus Walters (Ukraine) Georgii Kravchenko
October 6	Sharm El Sheikh, Egypt; Hard; M15; Singles and doubles draws	(Georgia (country)) Aleksandre Bakshi; 7–6^{(7–3)}, 6–4	(Egypt) Amr Elsayed	(Slovakia) Michal Krajčí (Ukraine) Yurii Dzhavakian	Konstantin Zhzhenov (Ukraine) Vadym Ursu (Romania) Tudor Batin (Poland) Martyn Pawelski
October 6	Sharm El Sheikh, Egypt; Hard; M15; Singles and doubles draws	(United Kingdom) Joe Leather (United States) Christopher Papa; 6–7^{(4–7)}, 6–0, [10–6]	(United Kingdom) Viktor Frydrych (Egypt) Karim Ibrahim	(Slovakia) Michal Krajčí (Ukraine) Yurii Dzhavakian	Konstantin Zhzhenov (Ukraine) Vadym Ursu (Romania) Tudor Batin (Poland) Martyn Pawelski
October 6	Monastir, Tunisia; Hard; M15; Singles and doubles draws	(Morocco) Karim Bennani; 6–0, 3–6, 6–2	(Senegal) Seydina André	(Germany) Tom Gentzsch (France) Sean Cuenin	(Algeria) Samir Hamza Reguig (France) Nicolas Jadoun (Netherlands) Abel Forger (Luxembourg) Aaron Gil Garcia
October 6	Monastir, Tunisia; Hard; M15; Singles and doubles draws	(United Kingdom) Ewen Lumsden (Ghana) Isaac Nortey; 6–3, 6–7^{(7–9)}, [10–7]	(Netherlands) Pieter De Lange (Netherlands) Abel Forger	(Germany) Tom Gentzsch (France) Sean Cuenin	(Algeria) Samir Hamza Reguig (France) Nicolas Jadoun (Netherlands) Abel Forger (Luxembourg) Aaron Gil Garcia
October 6	Lexington, United States; Hard; M15; Singles and doubles draws	(France) Raphael Perot; 7–6^{(7–3)}, 0–6, 6–4	(Japan) Shunsuke Mitsui	(France) Andrej Loncarevic (United States) Jack Kennedy	(United States) Gianluca Brunkow (United States) Eli Stephenson (United States) Karl Poling (France) Mathis Bondaz
October 6	Lexington, United States; Hard; M15; Singles and doubles draws	(United States) JJ Mercer (United States) Eli Stephenson; 7–5, 6–3	(United States) Ryan Fishback (United States) Matthew Thomson	(France) Andrej Loncarevic (United States) Jack Kennedy	(United States) Gianluca Brunkow (United States) Eli Stephenson (United States) Karl Poling (France) Mathis Bondaz
October 13	Santa Margherita di Pula, Italy; Clay; M25; Singles and doubles draws	(Italy) Gianluca Cadenasso; 6–1, 6–1	(Czech Republic) Martin Krumich	(Austria) Sebastian Sorger (Czech Republic) Dominik Reček	(Italy) Gianmarco Ferrari (France) Alexandre Aubriot (Italy) Manuel Mazza (Dominican Republic) Nick Hardt
October 13	Santa Margherita di Pula, Italy; Clay; M25; Singles and doubles draws	(Italy) Federico Bondioli (Italy) Giovanni Oradini; 6–3, 6–4	(Netherlands) Michiel de Krom (Ukraine) Oleksandr Ovcharenko	(Austria) Sebastian Sorger (Czech Republic) Dominik Reček	(Italy) Gianmarco Ferrari (France) Alexandre Aubriot (Italy) Manuel Mazza (Dominican Republic) Nick Hardt
October 13	Monastir, Tunisia; Hard; M25; Singles and doubles draws	(United Kingdom) Lui Maxted; 6–4, 5–7, 6–4	(France) Étienne Donnet	(France) Mathys Erhard (Ukraine) Eric Vanshelboim	(Belgium) Jack Logé (Germany) Luca Wiedenmann (United Kingdom) Connor Thomson (Portugal) Tiago Pereira
October 13	Monastir, Tunisia; Hard; M25; Singles and doubles draws	Sergey Betov; Daniil Ostapenkov; 7–6^{(8–6)}, 1–6, [13–11]	(United Kingdom) Lui Maxted (United Kingdom) Connor Thomson	(France) Mathys Erhard (Ukraine) Eric Vanshelboim	(Belgium) Jack Logé (Germany) Luca Wiedenmann (United Kingdom) Connor Thomson (Portugal) Tiago Pereira
October 13	Kigali, Rwanda; Clay; M25; Singles and doubles draws	(Netherlands) Max Houkes; 6–3, 3–6, 6–1	(Morocco) Yassine Dlimi	(Bulgaria) Dinko Dinev (France) Corentin Denolly	(Belgium) Martin van der Meerschen (France) Amaury Raynel (South Africa) Marc van der Merwe (France) Florent Bax
October 13	Kigali, Rwanda; Clay; M25; Singles and doubles draws	(Germany) Maximilian Homberg (Belgium) Martin van der Meerschen; 3–6, 7–6^{(7–1)}, [11–9]	(Luxembourg) Louis Van Herck (Germany) Marlon Vankan	(Bulgaria) Dinko Dinev (France) Corentin Denolly	(Belgium) Martin van der Meerschen (France) Amaury Raynel (South Africa) Marc van der Merwe (France) Florent Bax
October 13	Castellón, Spain; Clay; M15; Singles and doubles draws	(Spain) Oscar Jose Gutierrez; 6–4, 6–3	(Spain) Diego Augusto Barreto Sánchez	(Spain) Carlos López Montagud (Bulgaria) Yanaki Milev	(Italy) Pietro Marino (Romania) Darius Florin Pop (Venezuela) Ignacio Parisca Romera (France) Maxime Chazal
October 13	Castellón, Spain; Clay; M15; Singles and doubles draws	Doubles competition was cancelled due to poor weather		(Spain) Carlos López Montagud (Bulgaria) Yanaki Milev	(Italy) Pietro Marino (Romania) Darius Florin Pop (Venezuela) Ignacio Parisca Romera (France) Maxime Chazal
October 13	Villers-lès-Nancy, France; Hard (i); M15; Singles and doubles draws	(France) Robin Catry; 2–6, 6–2, 6–4	(United Kingdom) Liam Broady	(France) Arthur Nagel (Luxembourg) Alex Knaff	(United States) Enzo Wallart (Switzerland) Damien Wenger (Belgium) Nicolas Ifi (France) Loann Massard
October 13	Villers-lès-Nancy, France; Hard (i); M15; Singles and doubles draws	(United Kingdom) Ben Jones (Germany) Tim Rühl; 2–6, 7–6^{(7–5)}, [16–14]	(Ukraine) Tymur Bieldiugin (Belgium) Nicolas Ifi	(France) Arthur Nagel (Luxembourg) Alex Knaff	(United States) Enzo Wallart (Switzerland) Damien Wenger (Belgium) Nicolas Ifi (France) Loann Massard
October 13	Offenbach am Main, Germany; Hard (i); M15; Singles and doubles draws	(Italy) Andrea Guerrieri; 7–6^{(7–3)}, 6–0	(Denmark) Christian Sigsgaard	(Italy) Leonardo Rossi (Netherlands) Alec Deckers	(Germany) Mika Petkovic (Germany) Nino Ehrenschneider (Germany) Nikolai Barsukov (Germany) Max Schönhaus
October 13	Offenbach am Main, Germany; Hard (i); M15; Singles and doubles draws	(Denmark) Oskar Brostrøm Poulsen (Denmark) Christian Sigsgaard; 7–5, 7–6^{(7–0)}	(Germany) Lucas Gerch (Germany) Kai Wehnelt	(Italy) Leonardo Rossi (Netherlands) Alec Deckers	(Germany) Mika Petkovic (Germany) Nino Ehrenschneider (Germany) Nikolai Barsukov (Germany) Max Schönhaus
October 13	Heraklion, Greece; Hard; M15; Singles and doubles draws	(Ukraine) Georgii Kravchenko; 7–6^{(7–2)}, 3–6, 7–6^{(9–7)}	(France) Felix Balshaw	(Switzerland) Johan Nikles (Latvia) Kārlis Ozoliņš	(Italy) Pietro Fellin (Switzerland) Jeffrey von der Schulenburg (United Kingdom) Millen Hurrion (Germany) Michel Hopp
October 13	Heraklion, Greece; Hard; M15; Singles and doubles draws	(United States) Maxwell Benson (New Zealand) Reece Falck; 6–3, 6–4	(United States) Henry Lieberman (France) Mathieu Scaglia	(Switzerland) Johan Nikles (Latvia) Kārlis Ozoliņš	(Italy) Pietro Fellin (Switzerland) Jeffrey von der Schulenburg (United Kingdom) Millen Hurrion (Germany) Michel Hopp
October 13	Sharm El Sheikh, Egypt; Hard; M15; Singles and doubles draws	(Switzerland) Gian Luca Tanner; 2–6, 6–3, 6–0	(Georgia (country)) Aleksandre Bakshi	(Ukraine) Vadym Ursu (United Kingdom) Ali Habib	Ivan Nedelko (Ukraine) Yurii Dzhavakian (South Africa) John Bothma; Dmitry Bessonov
October 13	Sharm El Sheikh, Egypt; Hard; M15; Singles and doubles draws	(Spain) Oscar Mesquida Berg (Switzerland) Gian Luca Tanner; 6–4, 6–4	(Ukraine) Yurii Dzhavakian (Ukraine) Vadym Ursu	(Ukraine) Vadym Ursu (United Kingdom) Ali Habib	Ivan Nedelko (Ukraine) Yurii Dzhavakian (South Africa) John Bothma; Dmitry Bessonov
October 13	Monastir, Tunisia; Hard; M15; Singles and doubles draws	(France) César Bouchelaghem; 7–5, 4–6, 6–2	(Turkey) Mert Alkaya	(Ukraine) Vladyslav Orlov (France) Sean Cuenin	(Netherlands) Abel Forger (Spain) Jorge Plans (United Kingdom) James Connel (France) Constantin Bittoun Kouzmine
October 13	Monastir, Tunisia; Hard; M15; Singles and doubles draws	(Netherlands) Pieter De Lange (Netherlands) Abel Forger; 7–6^{(7–5)}, 6–3	(France) César Bouchelaghem (India) Chirag Duhan	(Ukraine) Vladyslav Orlov (France) Sean Cuenin	(Netherlands) Abel Forger (Spain) Jorge Plans (United Kingdom) James Connel (France) Constantin Bittoun Kouzmine
October 13	Santiago, Chile; Clay; M15; Singles and doubles draws	(Argentina) Hernán Casanova; 6–0, 0–6, 7–6^{(7–5)}	(Argentina) Juan Manuel La Serna	(United States) Ryan Dickerson (Argentina) Carlos María Zárate	(Uruguay) Joaquín Aguilar Cardozo (Argentina) Dante Pagani (Argentina) Fernando Cavallo (Chile) Benjamin Perez
October 13	Santiago, Chile; Clay; M15; Singles and doubles draws	(United States) Dakotah Bobo (United States) Ryan Dickerson; 6–3, 7–6^{(7–0)}	(Argentina) Manuel Mouilleron Salvo (Argentina) Lucio Ratti	(United States) Ryan Dickerson (Argentina) Carlos María Zárate	(Uruguay) Joaquín Aguilar Cardozo (Argentina) Dante Pagani (Argentina) Fernando Cavallo (Chile) Benjamin Perez
October 20	Brisbane QTC Tennis International; Brisbane, Australia; Hard; M25; Singles and doubles draws	(Australia) Marc Polmans; 1–6, 7–6^{(7–2)}, 6–3	(Australia) Dane Sweeny	(Australia) Cruz Hewitt (Australia) Pavle Marinkov	(Australia) Jake Delaney (Australia) Joshua Charlton (New Zealand) Ajeet Rai (New Zealand) Alexander Klintcharov
October 20	Brisbane QTC Tennis International; Brisbane, Australia; Hard; M25; Singles and doubles draws	(Australia) Ethan Cook (Australia) Tai Sach; 6–4, 5–7, [10–7]	(Australia) Joshua Charlton (United Kingdom) Emile Hudd	(Australia) Cruz Hewitt (Australia) Pavle Marinkov	(Australia) Jake Delaney (Australia) Joshua Charlton (New Zealand) Ajeet Rai (New Zealand) Alexander Klintcharov
October 20	Huzhou, China; Hard; M25; Singles and doubles draws	(Japan) Akira Santillan; 6–4, 6–1	(Australia) Chase Ferguson	(Japan) Hayato Matsuoka (Chinese Taipei) Lee Kuan-yi	(Estonia) Kristjan Tamm (China) Liu Hanyi; Mikalai Haliak (China) Sun Qian
October 20	Huzhou, China; Hard; M25; Singles and doubles draws	(China) Yang Zijiang (China) Zeng Yaojie; 7–5, 6–7^{(10–12)}, [10–8]	(Spain) Ignasi Forcano (Estonia) Kristjan Tamm	(Japan) Hayato Matsuoka (Chinese Taipei) Lee Kuan-yi	(Estonia) Kristjan Tamm (China) Liu Hanyi; Mikalai Haliak (China) Sun Qian
October 20	Sheffield, United Kingdom; Hard (i); M25; Singles and doubles draws	(United Kingdom) James Story; 6–2, 3–6, 7–6^{(7–4)}	(United Kingdom) Anton Matusevich	(Netherlands) Jelle Sels (United Kingdom) Hamish Stewart	(France) Clément Chidekh (United Kingdom) Patrick Brady (United Kingdom) Ryan James Storrie (France) Matisse Bobichon
October 20	Sheffield, United Kingdom; Hard (i); M25; Singles and doubles draws	(United Kingdom) Hamish Stewart (United Kingdom) Connor Thomson; 6–3, 6–4	(France) Clément Chidekh (United Kingdom) Mark Whitehouse	(Netherlands) Jelle Sels (United Kingdom) Hamish Stewart	(France) Clément Chidekh (United Kingdom) Patrick Brady (United Kingdom) Ryan James Storrie (France) Matisse Bobichon
October 20	Sintra, Portugal; Hard; M25; Singles and doubles draws	(Belgium) Gilles-Arnaud Bailly; 3–6, 7–6^{(9–7)}, 6–1	(Colombia) Adrià Soriano Barrera	(Netherlands) Alec Deckers (Slovenia) Filip Jeff Planinšek	(Netherlands) Ryan Nijboer (Bulgaria) Anas Mazdrashki (Hungary) Matyas Fuele (Portugal) Tiago Cação
October 20	Sintra, Portugal; Hard; M25; Singles and doubles draws	(Portugal) Pedro Araújo (Spain) Rafael Izquierdo Luque; 6–0, 7–6^{(7–4)}	(Portugal) João Graça (Portugal) Tiago Torres	(Netherlands) Alec Deckers (Slovenia) Filip Jeff Planinšek	(Netherlands) Ryan Nijboer (Bulgaria) Anas Mazdrashki (Hungary) Matyas Fuele (Portugal) Tiago Cação
October 20	Sarreguemines, France; Carpet (i); M25; Singles and doubles draws	(France) Matt Ponchet; 6–7^{(3–7)}, 6–4, 6–4	(France) Tom Paris	(France) Arthur Nagel (France) Adan Freire da Silva	(Czech Republic) Matthew William Donald (United Kingdom) Ben Jones (Germany) Adrian Oetzbach (Switzerland) Nicolás Parizzia
October 20	Sarreguemines, France; Carpet (i); M25; Singles and doubles draws	(France) Arthur Nagel (Italy) Filippo Romano; 6–4, 6–4	(United Kingdom) Liam Hignett (United Kingdom) Ben Jones	(France) Arthur Nagel (France) Adan Freire da Silva	(Czech Republic) Matthew William Donald (United Kingdom) Ben Jones (Germany) Adrian Oetzbach (Switzerland) Nicolás Parizzia
October 20	Santa Margherita di Pula, Italy; Clay; M25; Singles and doubles draws	(Italy) Gianluca Cadenasso; 5–5 ret.	(Italy) Filippo Moroni	(Czech Republic) Martin Krumich (Italy) Juan Cruz Martin Manzano	Ivan Gakhov (Italy) Gianmarco Ferrari (Dominican Republic) Nick Hardt (Romania) Filip Cristian Jianu
October 20	Santa Margherita di Pula, Italy; Clay; M25; Singles and doubles draws	(Italy) Luca Potenza (Italy) Giorgio Ricca; Walkover	(Italy) Federico Iannaccone (Italy) Giorgio Tabacco	(Czech Republic) Martin Krumich (Italy) Juan Cruz Martin Manzano	Ivan Gakhov (Italy) Gianmarco Ferrari (Dominican Republic) Nick Hardt (Romania) Filip Cristian Jianu
October 20	Norman, United States; Hard; M25; Singles and doubles draws	(France) Raphael Perot; 3–6, 6–1, 7–5	(United States) Matthew Forbes	(Spain) Àlex Martínez (Jamaica) Blaise Bicknell	(United States) Kaylan Bigun (Japan) Asahi Harazaki (United States) Karl Poling (Brazil) Pedro Rodrigues
October 20	Norman, United States; Hard; M25; Singles and doubles draws	(Guadeloupe) Oscar Lacides (Mozambique) Bruno Nhavene; 7–6^{(7–5)}, 6–4	(United States) Felix Corwin (United States) Gavin Young	(Spain) Àlex Martínez (Jamaica) Blaise Bicknell	(United States) Kaylan Bigun (Japan) Asahi Harazaki (United States) Karl Poling (Brazil) Pedro Rodrigues
October 20	Tanagura, Japan; Hard; M15; Singles and doubles draws	(Japan) Hikaru Shiraishi; 6–3, 6–4	(Japan) Yusuke Kusuhara	(United States) Braden Shick (Japan) Sora Fukuda	(Japan) Ryota Tanuma (South Korea) Kim Dong-ju (Japan) Yuta Tomida (Japan) Taketo Takamisawa
October 20	Tanagura, Japan; Hard; M15; Singles and doubles draws	(Japan) Taisei Ichikawa (Japan) Yamato Sueoka; 6–4, 6–3	(Japan) Shunsuke Nakagawa (Japan) Riku Takahata	(United States) Braden Shick (Japan) Sora Fukuda	(Japan) Ryota Tanuma (South Korea) Kim Dong-ju (Japan) Yuta Tomida (Japan) Taketo Takamisawa
October 20	Hua Hin, Thailand; Hard; M15; Singles and doubles draws	(Brazil) Igor Marcondes; 7–5, 7–5	(France) Arthur Weber	(New Zealand) Isaac Becroft (France) Louis Larue	(Japan) Shinji Hazawa (Thailand) Thanapet Chanta (Australia) Oliver Anderson (Indonesia) Muhammad Rifqi Fitriadi
October 20	Hua Hin, Thailand; Hard; M15; Singles and doubles draws	(India) Sai Karteek Reddy Ganta (Thailand) Thantub Suksumrarn; 6–3, 4–6, [10–7]	(Japan) Shinji Hazawa (Japan) Leo Vithoontien	(New Zealand) Isaac Becroft (France) Louis Larue	(Japan) Shinji Hazawa (Thailand) Thanapet Chanta (Australia) Oliver Anderson (Indonesia) Muhammad Rifqi Fitriadi
October 20	Bol, Croatia; Clay; M15; Singles and doubles draws	(Bosnia and Herzegovina) Andrej Nedić; 6–3, 6–1	Svyatoslav Gulin	(Serbia) Marko Miladinović (Ukraine) Viacheslav Bielinskyi	(Slovenia) Miha Vetrih (Romania) Ștefan Paloși (France) Maxime Chazal (Bosnia and Herzegovina) Mirza Bašić
October 20	Bol, Croatia; Clay; M15; Singles and doubles draws	(Bosnia and Herzegovina) Mirza Bašić (Serbia) Marko Maksimović; 6–3, 7–5	(Bosnia and Herzegovina) Andrej Nedić (Bosnia and Herzegovina) Vladan Tadić	(Serbia) Marko Miladinović (Ukraine) Viacheslav Bielinskyi	(Slovenia) Miha Vetrih (Romania) Ștefan Paloși (France) Maxime Chazal (Bosnia and Herzegovina) Mirza Bašić
October 20	Heraklion, Greece; Hard; M15; Singles and doubles draws	(Switzerland) Luca Staeheli; 6–4, 6–1	(Greece) Stefanos Sakellaridis	(France) Martin Sabas (Cyprus) Melios Efstathiou	(Greece) Dimitris Azoidis (Greece) Petros Tsitsipas (France) Maxence Bertimon (France) Mathieu Scaglia
October 20	Heraklion, Greece; Hard; M15; Singles and doubles draws	(South Africa) Vasilios Caripi (Greece) Dimitris Sakellaridis; 6–2, 7–6^{(7–3)}	(Cyprus) Melios Efstathiou (Cyprus) Eleftherios Neos	(France) Martin Sabas (Cyprus) Melios Efstathiou	(Greece) Dimitris Azoidis (Greece) Petros Tsitsipas (France) Maxence Bertimon (France) Mathieu Scaglia
October 20	Sharm El Sheikh, Egypt; Hard; M15; Singles and doubles draws	(Egypt) Amr Elsayed; 6–4, 6–3	(Egypt) Fares Zakaria	(Serbia) Ognjen Milić (Ukraine) Yurii Dzhavakian	(Ukraine) Vadym Ursu (Poland) Tomasz Berkieta; Egor Pleshivtsev (Finland) Oskari Eerola
October 20	Sharm El Sheikh, Egypt; Hard; M15; Singles and doubles draws	(Belgium) Romain Faucon (United States) Leonardo Vega; 7–5, 6–4	Ruslan Tiukaev; Konstantin Zhzhenov	(Serbia) Ognjen Milić (Ukraine) Yurii Dzhavakian	(Ukraine) Vadym Ursu (Poland) Tomasz Berkieta; Egor Pleshivtsev (Finland) Oskari Eerola
October 20	Monastir, Tunisia; Hard; M15; Singles and doubles draws	(Italy) Michele Ribecai; 5–6 ret.	(Turkey) Yankı Erel	(France) César Bouchelaghem; Igor Kudriashov	(Monaco) Rocco Piatti (Ukraine) Eric Vanshelboim (Turkey) Mert Alkaya (Germany) Luca Wiedenmann
October 20	Monastir, Tunisia; Hard; M15; Singles and doubles draws	(Turkey) Mert Alkaya (Turkey) S Mert Özdemir; 6–2, 6–2	(France) Nicolas Robert (Tunisia) Alaa Trifi	(France) César Bouchelaghem; Igor Kudriashov	(Monaco) Rocco Piatti (Ukraine) Eric Vanshelboim (Turkey) Mert Alkaya (Germany) Luca Wiedenmann
October 20	Santiago, Chile; Clay; M15; Singles and doubles draws	(Uruguay) Joaquín Aguilar Cardozo; 6–2, 6–4	(Argentina) Juan Manuel La Serna	(Argentina) Santiago de la Fuente (Argentina) Ignacio Monzón	(Argentina) Hernán Casanova (Argentina) Máximo Zeitune (Uruguay) Federico Aguilar Cardozo (Argentina) Carlos María Zárate
October 20	Santiago, Chile; Clay; M15; Singles and doubles draws	(Uruguay) Joaquín Aguilar Cardozo (Argentina) Santiago de la Fuente; 6–7^{(4–7)}, 6–3, [10–3]	(Argentina) Manuel Mouilleron Salvo (Argentina) Lucio Ratti	(Argentina) Santiago de la Fuente (Argentina) Ignacio Monzón	(Argentina) Hernán Casanova (Argentina) Máximo Zeitune (Uruguay) Federico Aguilar Cardozo (Argentina) Carlos María Zárate
October 27	Brisbane QTC Tennis International; Brisbane, Australia; Hard; M25; Singles and doubles draws	(Australia) Dane Sweeny; 6–7^{(5–7)}, 6–3, 6–2	(Denmark) Carl Emil Overbeck	(Australia) Matthew Dellavedova (United States) Christian Langmo	(Poland) Filip Peliwo (Australia) Jake Delaney (Australia) Pavle Marinkov (Australia) Joshua Charlton
October 27	Brisbane QTC Tennis International; Brisbane, Australia; Hard; M25; Singles and doubles draws	(Australia) Joshua Charlton (United Kingdom) Emile Hudd; 6–3, 6–1	(Japan) Yuichiro Inui (Denmark) Carl Emil Overbeck	(Australia) Matthew Dellavedova (United States) Christian Langmo	(Poland) Filip Peliwo (Australia) Jake Delaney (Australia) Pavle Marinkov (Australia) Joshua Charlton
October 27	Qiandaohu, China; Hard; M25; Singles and doubles draws	(Uzbekistan) Sergey Fomin; 6–2, 6–1	Mikalai Haliak	(China) Sun Fajing (China) Mo Yecong	(Japan) Hayato Matsuoka (Malaysia) Mitsuki Wei Kang Leong (Japan) Akira Santillan (Australia) Chase Ferguson
October 27	Qiandaohu, China; Hard; M25; Singles and doubles draws	(Uzbekistan) Sergey Fomin (Spain) Ignasi Forcano; 6–2, 6–4	(China) Fnu Nidunjianzan (China) Sun Fajing	(China) Sun Fajing (China) Mo Yecong	(Japan) Hayato Matsuoka (Malaysia) Mitsuki Wei Kang Leong (Japan) Akira Santillan (Australia) Chase Ferguson
October 27	GB Pro-Series Glasgow; Glasgow, United Kingdom; Hard (i); M25; Singles and doubles draws	(United Kingdom) Harry Wendelken; 6–3, 1–6, 6–2	(Netherlands) Jelle Sels	(United Kingdom) Alastair Gray (United Kingdom) Hamish Stewart	(United Kingdom) Harry Wendelken (Czech Republic) Jonáš Forejtek; Marat Sharipov (Netherlands) Niels Visker
October 27	GB Pro-Series Glasgow; Glasgow, United Kingdom; Hard (i); M25; Singles and doubles draws	(Netherlands) Jarno Jans (Netherlands) Niels Visker; 7–5, 6–3	(United States) Phillip Jordan (United Kingdom) Joe Tyler	(United Kingdom) Alastair Gray (United Kingdom) Hamish Stewart	(United Kingdom) Harry Wendelken (Czech Republic) Jonáš Forejtek; Marat Sharipov (Netherlands) Niels Visker
October 27	Sintra, Portugal; Hard; M25; Singles and doubles draws	(Italy) Carlo Alberto Caniato; 7–5, 6–2	(Belgium) Gilles-Arnaud Bailly	(Spain) Rafael Izquierdo Luque (Poland) Daniel Michalski	(Germany) Rudolf Molleker (Portugal) Tiago Cação (Portugal) Gastão Elias (Netherlands) Ryan Nijboer
October 27	Sintra, Portugal; Hard; M25; Singles and doubles draws	(Portugal) João Graça (Portugal) Tiago Torres; Walkover	(Spain) Rafael Izquierdo Luque; Pavel Lagutin	(Spain) Rafael Izquierdo Luque (Poland) Daniel Michalski	(Germany) Rudolf Molleker (Portugal) Tiago Cação (Portugal) Gastão Elias (Netherlands) Ryan Nijboer
October 27	Lajeado, Brazil; Clay; M25; Singles and doubles draws	(Brazil) Gustavo Heide; 6–1, 6–4	(Argentina) Santiago Rodríguez Taverna	(Brazil) Matheus Pucinelli de Almeida (Argentina) Julián Cúndom	(Brazil) Eduardo Ribeiro (Brazil) Pedro Sakamoto (Argentina) Hernán Casanova (Brazil) João Eduardo Schiessl
October 27	Lajeado, Brazil; Clay; M25; Singles and doubles draws	(United States) Bruno Kuzuhara (Brazil) João Eduardo Schiessl; 6–4, 6–7^{(4–7)}, [10–8]	(Brazil) Mateus Alves (Brazil) Eduardo Ribeiro	(Brazil) Matheus Pucinelli de Almeida (Argentina) Julián Cúndom	(Brazil) Eduardo Ribeiro (Brazil) Pedro Sakamoto (Argentina) Hernán Casanova (Brazil) João Eduardo Schiessl
October 27	Harlingen, United States; Hard; M25; Singles and doubles draws	(Spain) Àlex Martínez; 6–3, 2–6, 6–4	(United Kingdom) Aidan McHugh	(Hungary) Zsombor Velcz (United Kingdom) Henry Searle	(Romania) Gabi Adrian Boitan (France) Raphael Perot (Norway) Andreja Petrovic (United States) Aidan Kim
October 27	Harlingen, United States; Hard; M25; Singles and doubles draws	(Ghana) Abraham Asaba (Spain) Àlex Martínez; Walkover	(Germany) Mariano Dedura-Palomero (Germany) Sydney Zick	(Hungary) Zsombor Velcz (United Kingdom) Henry Searle	(Romania) Gabi Adrian Boitan (France) Raphael Perot (Norway) Andreja Petrovic (United States) Aidan Kim
October 27	Yanagawa, Japan; Hard; M15; Singles and doubles draws	(United States) Braden Shick; 6–3, 6–3	(New Zealand) Moerani Bouzige	(Japan) Keisuke Saitoh (Japan) Sho Katayama	(Japan) Taketo Takamisawa (Japan) Yuta Kawahashi (Japan) Taisei Ichikawa (Japan) Ko Suzuki
October 27	Yanagawa, Japan; Hard; M15; Singles and doubles draws	(Japan) Sho Katayama (Japan) Yuhei Kono; 6–1, 6–4	(South Korea) Sim Sung-been (Japan) Yamato Sueoka	(Japan) Keisuke Saitoh (Japan) Sho Katayama	(Japan) Taketo Takamisawa (Japan) Yuta Kawahashi (Japan) Taisei Ichikawa (Japan) Ko Suzuki
October 27	Hua Hin, Thailand; Hard; M15; Singles and doubles draws	(Brazil) Igor Marcondes; 6–1, 6–1	(France) Arthur Weber	(Thailand) Thanapet Chanta (Indonesia) Muhammad Rifqi Fitriadi	(India) Mukund Sasikumar (Japan) Shinji Hazawa (Thailand) Markus Malaszszak (Japan) Leo Vithoontien
October 27	Hua Hin, Thailand; Hard; M15; Singles and doubles draws	(Japan) Shinji Hazawa (Japan) Leo Vithoontien; 7–6^{(7–2)}, 6–2	(Brazil) Igor Marcondes (Hong Kong) Wong Tsz-fu	(Thailand) Thanapet Chanta (Indonesia) Muhammad Rifqi Fitriadi	(India) Mukund Sasikumar (Japan) Shinji Hazawa (Thailand) Markus Malaszszak (Japan) Leo Vithoontien
October 27	Marsa, Malta; Hard; M15; Singles and doubles draws	(France) Arthur Nagel; 6–4, 7–5	(United Kingdom) Toby Samuel	(Germany) Marc Majdandzic (France) Yanis Ghazouani Durand	(Greece) Petros Tsitsipas (Ukraine) Aleksandr Braynin (Italy) Lorenzo Angelini (France) Constantin Bittoun Kouzmine
October 27	Marsa, Malta; Hard; M15; Singles and doubles draws	(Ukraine) Aleksandr Braynin (Netherlands) Stijn Pel; 6–3, 6–4	(Switzerland) Andrin Casanova (Switzerland) Nicolás Parizzia	(Germany) Marc Majdandzic (France) Yanis Ghazouani Durand	(Greece) Petros Tsitsipas (Ukraine) Aleksandr Braynin (Italy) Lorenzo Angelini (France) Constantin Bittoun Kouzmine
October 27	Sëlva Gardena, Italy; Hard (i); M15; Singles and doubles draws	(Austria) Sandro Kopp; 6–4, 7–6^{(7–4)}	(Italy) Filippo Romano	(Slovenia) Žiga Šeško (Germany) Niklas Schell	(Italy) Giovanni Oradini (Italy) Stefano Napolitano (Italy) Pietro Fellin (Italy) Nicola Rispoli
October 27	Sëlva Gardena, Italy; Hard (i); M15; Singles and doubles draws	(Italy) Filippo Romano (Italy) Gabriele Volpi; 6–2, 6–4	(Germany) Calvin Müller (Germany) Niklas Schell	(Slovenia) Žiga Šeško (Germany) Niklas Schell	(Italy) Giovanni Oradini (Italy) Stefano Napolitano (Italy) Pietro Fellin (Italy) Nicola Rispoli
October 27	Szabolcsveresmart, Hungary; Hard (i); M15; Singles and doubles draws	(Hungary) Péter Fajta; 4–6, 7–5, 6–3	(France) Matisse Bobichon	Timofei Derepasko (Norway) Herman Hoeyeraal	(Hungary) Achilles Belkovics (Hungary) David Bakonyi (Poland) Karol Filar (Hungary) Attila Boros
October 27	Szabolcsveresmart, Hungary; Hard (i); M15; Singles and doubles draws	(Romania) Tudor Batin (Romania) Rareș Teodor Pieleanu; 6–4, 6–4	(Norway) Herman Hoeyeraal (Sweden) Melvin Kumar	Timofei Derepasko (Norway) Herman Hoeyeraal	(Hungary) Achilles Belkovics (Hungary) David Bakonyi (Poland) Karol Filar (Hungary) Attila Boros
October 27	Bol, Croatia; Clay; M15; Singles and doubles draws	(Bosnia and Herzegovina) Andrej Nedić; 4–6, 7–5, 7–5	(Romania) Cezar Crețu	(Romania) Nicholas David Ionel (Serbia) Dušan Obradović	(Italy) Pietro Scomparin (Italy) Giuseppe La Vela (France) Maxime Chazal (Romania) Ștefan Paloși
October 27	Bol, Croatia; Clay; M15; Singles and doubles draws	(Serbia) Ivan Sabanov (Serbia) Matej Sabanov; 6–4, 6–3	(South Africa) Alec Beckley (Serbia) Marko Maksimović	(Romania) Nicholas David Ionel (Serbia) Dušan Obradović	(Italy) Pietro Scomparin (Italy) Giuseppe La Vela (France) Maxime Chazal (Romania) Ștefan Paloși
October 27	Heraklion, Greece; Hard; M15; Singles and doubles draws	(South Africa) Philip Henning; 6–2, 6–0	(Romania) Gabriel Ghețu	(France) Benjamin Pietri (South Africa) Marc van der Merwe	(Ukraine) Volodymyr Iakubenko (United States) Alex Jones (Germany) Michel Hopp (Cyprus) Melios Efstathiou
October 27	Heraklion, Greece; Hard; M15; Singles and doubles draws	(Cyprus) Melios Efstathiou (Cyprus) Eleftherios Neos; 6–3, 6–4	(South Africa) Vasilios Caripi (Greece) Dimitris Sakellaridis	(France) Benjamin Pietri (South Africa) Marc van der Merwe	(Ukraine) Volodymyr Iakubenko (United States) Alex Jones (Germany) Michel Hopp (Cyprus) Melios Efstathiou
October 27	Sharm El Sheikh, Egypt; Hard; M15; Singles and doubles draws	(Ukraine) Vadym Ursu; 7–5, 6–3	(Serbia) Ognjen Milić	(Ukraine) Yurii Dzhavakian (Egypt) Fares Zakaria	(Georgia (country)) Zura Tkemaladze (Egypt) Michael Bassem Sobhy (Egypt) Amr Elsayed (Italy) Pierluigi Basile
October 27	Sharm El Sheikh, Egypt; Hard; M15; Singles and doubles draws	(India) Aryan Lakshmanan (Germany) Cedric Stanke; 7–6^{(7–3)}, 6–2	(Sweden) Jonas Eriksson Ziverts (France) Hugo Pierre	(Ukraine) Yurii Dzhavakian (Egypt) Fares Zakaria	(Georgia (country)) Zura Tkemaladze (Egypt) Michael Bassem Sobhy (Egypt) Amr Elsayed (Italy) Pierluigi Basile
October 27	Monastir, Tunisia; Hard; M15; Singles and doubles draws	Igor Kudriashov; 2–6, 7–6^{(7–3)}, 7–6^{(7–5)}	(France) Cyril Vandermeersch	(Latvia) Robert Strombachs (Italy) Lorenzo Sciahbasi	(Sweden) Arvid Nordquist (India) Chirag Duhan (United States) Mwendwa Mbithi (Serbia) Branko Đurić
October 27	Monastir, Tunisia; Hard; M15; Singles and doubles draws	(Estonia) Johannes Seeman (Latvia) Robert Strombachs; 6–4, 7–6^{(7–4)}	(United Kingdom) Jeremy Gschwendtner (Italy) Federico Valle	(Latvia) Robert Strombachs (Italy) Lorenzo Sciahbasi	(Sweden) Arvid Nordquist (India) Chirag Duhan (United States) Mwendwa Mbithi (Serbia) Branko Đurić
October 27	Trois-Rivières, Canada; Hard (i); M15; Singles and doubles draws	(United States) Daniel Milavsky; 6–2, 3–6, 6–3	(United States) Theodore Dean	(United States) Billy Suarez (Morocco) Taha Baadi	(United States) Matt Kuhar (Canada) Mikael Arseneault (France) Guillaume Dalmasso (Germany) Louis Wessels
October 27	Trois-Rivières, Canada; Hard (i); M15; Singles and doubles draws	(United States) Theodore Dean (Denmark) Oskar Brostrøm Poulsen; 6–2, 7–5	(Netherlands) Brian Bozemoj (United States) Billy Suarez	(United States) Billy Suarez (Morocco) Taha Baadi	(United States) Matt Kuhar (Canada) Mikael Arseneault (France) Guillaume Dalmasso (Germany) Louis Wessels
October 27	Ibagué, Colombia; Clay; M15; Singles and doubles draws	(Brazil) Bruno Fernandez; 6–3, 6–2	(Argentina) Valerio Aboian	(Argentina) Lucio Ratti (United States) Victor Lilov	(Argentina) Tomas Martinez (Argentina) Mateo del Pino (Brazil) Natan Rodrigues (Colombia) Juan Sebastián Osorio
October 27	Ibagué, Colombia; Clay; M15; Singles and doubles draws	(Colombia) Juan Sebastián Gómez (Chile) Daniel Antonio Núñez; 7–5, 7–6^{(7–5)}	(Argentina) Mateo del Pino (Brazil) Bruno Fernandez	(Argentina) Lucio Ratti (United States) Victor Lilov	(Argentina) Tomas Martinez (Argentina) Mateo del Pino (Brazil) Natan Rodrigues (Colombia) Juan Sebastián Osorio

=== November ===
Week of	Tournament	Winner	Runners-up	Semifinalists	Quarterfinalists
November 3	Valencia, Spain; Clay; M25; Singles and doubles draws	(Spain) Carlos Sánchez Jover; 1–6, 6–4, 6–1	(Spain) Pedro Rodenas	(Spain) Miguel Damas (Czech Republic) Martin Krumich	(Switzerland) Patrick Schoen (Italy) Raúl Brancaccio (Spain) Javier Barranco Cosano (Italy) Franco Agamenone
November 3	Valencia, Spain; Clay; M25; Singles and doubles draws	(Spain) Mario Mansilla Díez (Spain) Benjamín Winter López; 6–3, 6–2	(Republic of Ireland) Charles Barry (Spain) Ignasi Forcano	(Spain) Miguel Damas (Czech Republic) Martin Krumich	(Switzerland) Patrick Schoen (Italy) Raúl Brancaccio (Spain) Javier Barranco Cosano (Italy) Franco Agamenone
November 3	Monastir, Tunisia; Hard; M25; Singles and doubles draws	(Italy) Jacopo Berrettini; 7–6^{(7–3)}, 6–2	(Portugal) Tiago Pereira	(Spain) Alejandro Moro Cañas (Italy) Lorenzo Carboni	(Belgium) Michael Geerts (Belgium) Buvaysar Gadamauri (France) Robin Bertrand (Serbia) Branko Đurić
November 3	Monastir, Tunisia; Hard; M25; Singles and doubles draws	(Belgium) Buvaysar Gadamauri (United States) Mwendwa Mbithi; 7–6^{(7–4)}, 2–6, [10–8]	(United Kingdom) Scott Duncan (United Kingdom) James MacKinlay	(Spain) Alejandro Moro Cañas (Italy) Lorenzo Carboni	(Belgium) Michael Geerts (Belgium) Buvaysar Gadamauri (France) Robin Bertrand (Serbia) Branko Đurić
November 3	Montreal, Canada; Hard (i); M25; Singles and doubles draws	(Poland) Maks Kaśnikowski; 7–6^{(7–3)}, 6–1	(Morocco) Taha Baadi	(Denmark) Oskar Brostrøm Poulsen (United States) Cannon Kingsley	(Canada) Duncan Chan (Canada) Juan Carlos Aguilar (Mexico) Alan Magadán (United States) Marko Mesarovic
November 3	Montreal, Canada; Hard (i); M25; Singles and doubles draws	(United Kingdom) Ben Jones (Czech Republic) David Poljak; 7–6^{(8–6)}, 4–6, [10–6]	(Canada) Duncan Chan (United States) Daniel Milavsky	(Denmark) Oskar Brostrøm Poulsen (United States) Cannon Kingsley	(Canada) Duncan Chan (Canada) Juan Carlos Aguilar (Mexico) Alan Magadán (United States) Marko Mesarovic
November 3	East Lansing, United States; Hard (i); M25; Singles and doubles draws	(United Kingdom) Aidan McHugh; 7–5, 6–3	Erik Arutiunian	(United States) Vignesh Gogineni (United States) Ozan Baris	(United States) Gavin Young (Germany) Maik Steiner (United States) Matthew Forbes (United States) Adhithya Ganesan
November 3	East Lansing, United States; Hard (i); M25; Singles and doubles draws	(Germany) Tim Rühl (Germany) Patrick Zahraj; 6–1, 6–2	(France) Romain Gales (United States) Vignesh Gogineni	(United States) Vignesh Gogineni (United States) Ozan Baris	(United States) Gavin Young (Germany) Maik Steiner (United States) Matthew Forbes (United States) Adhithya Ganesan
November 3	Guadalajara, Mexico; Clay; M25; Singles and doubles draws	(Germany) Elmar Ejupovic; 6–4, 6–3	(Mexico) Alan Fernando Rubio Fierros	(Spain) Matias Ponce de Leon Gomila (United States) Keenan Mayo	(Mexico) Alex Hernández (Mexico) Rodrigo Alujas (Argentina) Segundo Goity Zapico (Italy) Matteo Covato
November 3	Guadalajara, Mexico; Clay; M25; Singles and doubles draws	(Argentina) Valentín Basel (Italy) Matteo Covato; 7–6^{(7–3)}, 6–4	(Mexico) Rafael de Alba (Mexico) Alan Raúl Sau Franco	(Spain) Matias Ponce de Leon Gomila (United States) Keenan Mayo	(Mexico) Alex Hernández (Mexico) Rodrigo Alujas (Argentina) Segundo Goity Zapico (Italy) Matteo Covato
November 3	Santa Cruz do Sul, Brazil; Clay; M25; Singles and doubles draws	(Brazil) Matheus Pucinelli de Almeida; 7–6^{(7–2)}, 6–2	(Brazil) Pedro Boscardin Dias	(Brazil) João Eduardo Schiessl (Brazil) Pedro Sakamoto	(Argentina) Santiago Rodríguez Taverna (Argentina) Thiago Cigarrán (Brazil) Eduardo Ribeiro (Brazil) Mateus Alves
November 3	Santa Cruz do Sul, Brazil; Clay; M25; Singles and doubles draws	(Brazil) João Victor Couto Loureiro (Brazil) João Eduardo Schiessl; 6–3, 6–2	(Brazil) Mateus Alves (Brazil) Eduardo Ribeiro	(Brazil) João Eduardo Schiessl (Brazil) Pedro Sakamoto	(Argentina) Santiago Rodríguez Taverna (Argentina) Thiago Cigarrán (Brazil) Eduardo Ribeiro (Brazil) Mateus Alves
November 3	Manama, Bahrain; Hard; M15; Singles and doubles draws	(Germany) Nino Ehrenschneider; 6–4, 6–4	(Poland) Olaf Pieczkowski	(Bulgaria) Petr Nesterov (Spain) Iván Marrero Curbelo	(United Kingdom) Giles Hussey (Georgia (country)) Aleksandre Bakshi (France) Nicolas Jadoun (Uzbekistan) Sergey Fomin
November 3	Manama, Bahrain; Hard; M15; Singles and doubles draws	(Spain) Iván Marrero Curbelo (Latvia) Kārlis Ozoliņš; 6–7^{(10–12)}, 6–2, [10–8]	(Uzbekistan) Sergey Fomin; Daniil Golubev	(Bulgaria) Petr Nesterov (Spain) Iván Marrero Curbelo	(United Kingdom) Giles Hussey (Georgia (country)) Aleksandre Bakshi (France) Nicolas Jadoun (Uzbekistan) Sergey Fomin
November 3	San Gregorio di Catania, Italy; Clay; M15; Singles and doubles draws	(Italy) Gianmarco Ferrari; 3–6, 6–3, 6–4	(Italy) Federico Bondioli	Kirill Kivattsev (Poland) Marcel Zieliński	(Italy) Lorenzo Comino (Italy) Denis Constantin Spiridon (Italy) Massimo Giunta (Romania) Cezar Crețu
November 3	San Gregorio di Catania, Italy; Clay; M15; Singles and doubles draws	(Italy) Pietro Marino (Italy) Fausto Tabacco; 6–4, 6–2	(Italy) Sebastiano Cocola (Italy) Lorenzo Comino	Kirill Kivattsev (Poland) Marcel Zieliński	(Italy) Lorenzo Comino (Italy) Denis Constantin Spiridon (Italy) Massimo Giunta (Romania) Cezar Crețu
November 3	Heraklion, Greece; Hard; M15; Singles and doubles draws	(Greece) Ioannis Xilas; 6–4, 6–4	(United Kingdom) Millen Hurrion	(Austria) Sandro Kopp (Israel) Amit Vales	(Germany) Michel Hopp (United States) Miles Jones (Bulgaria) Dinko Dinev (Italy) Lorenzo Angelini
November 3	Heraklion, Greece; Hard; M15; Singles and doubles draws	(United Kingdom) Finn Murgett (United Kingdom) Marcus Walters; 6–2, 6–2	(United States) Alex Jones (United States) Miles Jones	(Austria) Sandro Kopp (Israel) Amit Vales	(Germany) Michel Hopp (United States) Miles Jones (Bulgaria) Dinko Dinev (Italy) Lorenzo Angelini
November 3	Antalya, Turkey; Clay; M15; Singles and doubles draws	(Romania) Filip Cristian Jianu; 6–1, 6–1	Bekkhan Atlangeriev	(Ukraine) Oleksandr Ovcharenko (Romania) Ștefan Adrian Andreescu	(Sweden) Dragoș Nicolae Mădăraș; Vardan Manukyan (Romania) Dragoș Nicolae Cazacu (France) Pierre Delage
November 3	Antalya, Turkey; Clay; M15; Singles and doubles draws	Egor Pleshivtsev (Turkey) Kerem Yılmaz; 3–6, 7–6^{(7–5)}, [15–13]	(Sweden) Oliver Johansson (Sweden) Nikola Slavic	(Ukraine) Oleksandr Ovcharenko (Romania) Ștefan Adrian Andreescu	(Sweden) Dragoș Nicolae Mădăraș; Vardan Manukyan (Romania) Dragoș Nicolae Cazacu (France) Pierre Delage
November 3	Sharm El Sheikh, Egypt; Hard; M15; Singles and doubles draws	(United Kingdom) Toby Samuel; 6–2, 6–4	(Slovakia) Michal Krajčí	Anton Arzhankin (Ukraine) Yurii Dzhavakian	(Belgium) Romain Faucon; Semen Pankin (Poland) Marcel Kamrowski; Artur Kukasian
November 3	Sharm El Sheikh, Egypt; Hard; M15; Singles and doubles draws	(Cyprus) Eleftherios Neos; Semen Pankin; 6–0, 2–6, [10–7]	(Belgium) Romain Faucon (Ukraine) Volodymyr Uzhylovskyi	Anton Arzhankin (Ukraine) Yurii Dzhavakian	(Belgium) Romain Faucon; Semen Pankin (Poland) Marcel Kamrowski; Artur Kukasian
November 3	Orlando, United States; Clay; M15; Singles and doubles draws	(United States) Ryan Colby; 6–3, 6–7^{(1–7)}, 6–4	(Serbia) Aleksa Ćirić	(United States) Keaton Hance (United States) Noah Johnston	(Peru) Christopher Li (United States) Felix Corwin (United States) Donald Nikolas Stoot (United States) Ryan Fishback
November 3	Orlando, United States; Clay; M15; Singles and doubles draws	(United States) Maxwell Exsted (United Kingdom) William Nolan; 6–4, 7–6^{(7–3)}	(United States) Ryan Colby (United States) Noah Zamora	(United States) Keaton Hance (United States) Noah Johnston	(Peru) Christopher Li (United States) Felix Corwin (United States) Donald Nikolas Stoot (United States) Ryan Fishback
November 3	Valledupar, Colombia; Hard; M15; Singles and doubles draws	(Argentina) Lucio Ratti; 7–6^{(7–4)}, 6–2	(United States) Ryan Dickerson	(Colombia) Juan Sebastián Gómez (Dominican Republic) Peter Bertran	(Colombia) Daniel Salazar (Chile) Daniel Antonio Núñez (Italy) Davide Pontoglio (Colombia) Sergio Hernandez
November 3	Valledupar, Colombia; Hard; M15; Singles and doubles draws	(Brazil) Lucca Pinto (Brazil) Natan Rodrigues; 6–3, 6–2	(Colombia) Juan Sebastián Gómez (Chile) Daniel Antonio Núñez	(Colombia) Juan Sebastián Gómez (Dominican Republic) Peter Bertran	(Colombia) Daniel Salazar (Chile) Daniel Antonio Núñez (Italy) Davide Pontoglio (Colombia) Sergio Hernandez
November 10	Manama, Bahrain; Hard; M25; Singles and doubles draws	(Uzbekistan) Sergey Fomin; 1–6, 6–4, 6–3	(Poland) Olaf Pieczkowski	(Germany) Maximilian Homberg (Spain) Iván Marrero Curbelo	(Ukraine) Nikita Bilozertsev (Germany) Nino Ehrenschneider (Netherlands) Jelle Sels; Timofei Derepasko
November 10	Manama, Bahrain; Hard; M25; Singles and doubles draws	(Chinese Taipei) Jeffrey Hsu (Latvia) Kārlis Ozoliņš; 2–6, 6–4, [10–5]	(United Kingdom) Giles Hussey (Netherlands) Jelle Sels	(Germany) Maximilian Homberg (Spain) Iván Marrero Curbelo	(Ukraine) Nikita Bilozertsev (Germany) Nino Ehrenschneider (Netherlands) Jelle Sels; Timofei Derepasko
November 10	Vale do Lobo, Portugal; Hard; M25; Singles and doubles draws	(United Kingdom) Alastair Gray; 6–3, 7–5	(Ukraine) Georgii Kravchenko	(Germany) Rudolf Molleker (Spain) Rafael Izquierdo Luque	(Spain) Alberto Barroso Campos (Belgium) Émilien Demanet (Belgium) Jack Logé (Spain) Tomás Currás Abasolo
November 10	Vale do Lobo, Portugal; Hard; M25; Singles and doubles draws	(Spain) Ignasi Forcano (Spain) Rafael Izquierdo Luque; 7–6^{(7–2)}, 6–3	(Spain) Alberto Barroso Campos (Spain) Benjamín Winter López	(Germany) Rudolf Molleker (Spain) Rafael Izquierdo Luque	(Spain) Alberto Barroso Campos (Belgium) Émilien Demanet (Belgium) Jack Logé (Spain) Tomás Currás Abasolo
November 10	Monastir, Tunisia; Hard; M25; Singles and doubles draws	(Germany) Max Schönhaus; 7–6^{(8–6)}, 7–6^{(7–4)}	(Czech Republic) Matthew William Donald	(Ivory Coast) Eliakim Coulibaly (Italy) Fabrizio Andaloro	Nikolay Vylegzhanin (Italy) Luca Potenza (France) Alexandre Aubriot (Tunisia) Aziz Ouakaa
November 10	Monastir, Tunisia; Hard; M25; Singles and doubles draws	(Sweden) Erik Grevelius (Sweden) Adam Heinonen; Walkover	(Belgium) Buvaysar Gadamauri (United States) Mwendwa Mbithi	(Ivory Coast) Eliakim Coulibaly (Italy) Fabrizio Andaloro	Nikolay Vylegzhanin (Italy) Luca Potenza (France) Alexandre Aubriot (Tunisia) Aziz Ouakaa
November 10	Columbus, United States; Hard (i); M25; Singles and doubles draws	(United States) Jack Anthrop; 7–6^{(7–1)}, 6–2	(United States) Aidan Kim	(United States) Gavin Young (United Kingdom) Henry Searle	(United States) Loren Thomas Byers (United States) Preston Stearns (United States) Victor Lilov (Poland) Fryderyk Lechno-Wasiutyński
November 10	Columbus, United States; Hard (i); M25; Singles and doubles draws	(United States) Brandon Carpico (United States) Nikita Filin; 6–3, 6–2	(United States) Sebastian Gorzny (United States) Gavin Young	(United States) Gavin Young (United Kingdom) Henry Searle	(United States) Loren Thomas Byers (United States) Preston Stearns (United States) Victor Lilov (Poland) Fryderyk Lechno-Wasiutyński
November 10	Manzanillo, Mexico; Hard; M25; Singles and doubles draws	(Italy) Manuel Plunger; 6–3, 6–2	(Mexico) Alan Fernando Rubio Fierros	(Romania) Sebastian Gima (Mexico) Rodrigo Alujas	(United States) Christopher Papa (Bulgaria) Viktor Markov (Argentina) Segundo Goity Zapico (Mexico) Rafael de Alba
November 10	Manzanillo, Mexico; Hard; M25; Singles and doubles draws	(United States) Christopher Papa (United States) Kyle Seelig; 6–4, 6–1	(Italy) Edoardo Cherie Ligniere (Bulgaria) Viktor Markov	(Romania) Sebastian Gima (Mexico) Rodrigo Alujas	(United States) Christopher Papa (Bulgaria) Viktor Markov (Argentina) Segundo Goity Zapico (Mexico) Rafael de Alba
November 10	Kuala Lumpur, Malaysia; Hard; M15; Singles and doubles draws	(Japan) Yuta Kawahashi; 7–5, 6–4	(France) Arthur Weber	(Poland) Karol Filar (United States) Evan Zhu	(Chinese Taipei) Chen Yan-cheng (Indonesia) Justin Barki (Japan) Ryusuke Horiuchi (Malaysia) Koay Hao Sheng
November 10	Kuala Lumpur, Malaysia; Hard; M15; Singles and doubles draws	(India) Sai Karteek Reddy Ganta (Thailand) Thantub Suksumrarn; 7–6^{(8–6)}, 4–6, [12–10]	(New Zealand) Corban Crowther (Netherlands) Fons van Sambeek	(Poland) Karol Filar (United States) Evan Zhu	(Chinese Taipei) Chen Yan-cheng (Indonesia) Justin Barki (Japan) Ryusuke Horiuchi (Malaysia) Koay Hao Sheng
November 10	Las Palmas, Spain; Clay; M15; Singles and doubles draws	(Spain) Alejandro Juan Mano; 6–4, 6–3	(Venezuela) Ignacio Parisca Romera	(Spain) Xavi Palomar (Italy) Juan Cruz Martin Manzano	(Italy) Federico Bondioli (Italy) Maximilian Figl (Spain) Imanol López Morillo (Italy) Andrea Fiorentini
November 10	Las Palmas, Spain; Clay; M15; Singles and doubles draws	(Spain) Lucca Helguera Casado (Venezuela) Ignacio Parisca Romera; 6–3, 6–7^{(4–7)}, [11–9]	(Italy) Gabriele Bosio (Italy) Juan Cruz Martin Manzano	(Spain) Xavi Palomar (Italy) Juan Cruz Martin Manzano	(Italy) Federico Bondioli (Italy) Maximilian Figl (Spain) Imanol López Morillo (Italy) Andrea Fiorentini
November 10	San Gregorio di Catania, Italy; Clay; M15; Singles and doubles draws	(Italy) Gianmarco Ferrari; 6–4, 6–2	(Slovenia) Žiga Šeško	Kirill Kivattsev (Italy) Sebastiano Cocola	(Italy) Gabriele Pennaforti (Italy) Pietro Marino (Poland) Alan Ważny (Italy) Alessandro Battiston
November 10	San Gregorio di Catania, Italy; Clay; M15; Singles and doubles draws	(Italy) Alessandro Coccioli (Italy) Felipe Virgili Berini; 6–4, 6–2	(United Kingdom) Jeremy Gschwendtner (Italy) Federico Valle	Kirill Kivattsev (Italy) Sebastiano Cocola	(Italy) Gabriele Pennaforti (Italy) Pietro Marino (Poland) Alan Ważny (Italy) Alessandro Battiston
November 10	Heraklion, Greece; Hard; M15; Singles and doubles draws	(Sweden) William Rejchtman Vinciguerra; 6–4, 3–6, 6–4	(Greece) Petros Tsitsipas	Uladzimir Ignatik (South Africa) Philip Henning	(United Kingdom) Finn Murgett (United Kingdom) Marcus Walters (Italy) Andrea Guerrieri (Greece) Dimitris Sakellaridis
November 10	Heraklion, Greece; Hard; M15; Singles and doubles draws	(Greece) Pavlos Tsitsipas (Greece) Petros Tsitsipas; 4–6, 6–3, [12–10]	(South Africa) Vasilios Caripi (Greece) Dimitris Sakellaridis	Uladzimir Ignatik (South Africa) Philip Henning	(United Kingdom) Finn Murgett (United Kingdom) Marcus Walters (Italy) Andrea Guerrieri (Greece) Dimitris Sakellaridis
November 10	Antalya, Turkey; Clay; M15; Singles and doubles draws	(United Kingdom) Felix Gill; 6–1, 6–3	(Romania) Radu Mihai Papoe	Andrey Chepelev (Italy) Samuele Pieri	(Serbia) Dušan Obradović (Romania) Nicholas David Ionel (Iran) Ali Yazdani (Bulgaria) Ivan Ivanov
November 10	Antalya, Turkey; Clay; M15; Singles and doubles draws	(Serbia) Marko Maksimović (Serbia) Stefan Popović; 2–6, 7–6^{(7–4)}, [10–8]	(Sweden) Dragoș Nicolae Mădăraș (Ukraine) Oleksandr Ovcharenko	Andrey Chepelev (Italy) Samuele Pieri	(Serbia) Dušan Obradović (Romania) Nicholas David Ionel (Iran) Ali Yazdani (Bulgaria) Ivan Ivanov
November 10	Sharm El Sheikh, Egypt; Hard; M15; Singles and doubles draws	(Germany) Vincent Marysko; 7–6^{(7–1)}, 6–1	(Kazakhstan) Denis Yevseyev	(Spain) Izan Almazán Valiente (Switzerland) Luca Staeheli	Petr Bar Biryukov (Ukraine) Vadym Ursu (Slovakia) Michal Krajčí; Sergey Petrov
November 10	Sharm El Sheikh, Egypt; Hard; M15; Singles and doubles draws	(Germany) Jannik Opitz (Germany) Tom Zeuch; 6–3, 7–5	(Czech Republic) Jan Hrazdil (Egypt) Karim Ibrahim	(Spain) Izan Almazán Valiente (Switzerland) Luca Staeheli	Petr Bar Biryukov (Ukraine) Vadym Ursu (Slovakia) Michal Krajčí; Sergey Petrov
November 10	Luanda, Angola; Hard; M15; Singles and doubles draws	(United States) Alex Kuperstein; 3–6, 6–4, 7–6^{(7–5)}	(Germany) Yannik Kelm	(Ukraine) Eric Vanshelboim (Switzerland) Gian Luca Tanner	(Angola) Daniel Domingos (Algeria) Samir Hamza Reguig (Belgium) Nicolas Ifi (France) Constantin Bittoun Kouzmine
November 10	Luanda, Angola; Hard; M15; Singles and doubles draws	(France) Sven Corbinais (Belgium) Nicolas Ifi; Walkover	(Spain) Oscar Mesquida Berg (Switzerland) Gian Luca Tanner	(Ukraine) Eric Vanshelboim (Switzerland) Gian Luca Tanner	(Angola) Daniel Domingos (Algeria) Samir Hamza Reguig (Belgium) Nicolas Ifi (France) Constantin Bittoun Kouzmine
November 10	Orlando, United States; Clay; M15; Singles and doubles draws	(Morocco) Reda Bennani; 6–7^{(1–7)}, 6–4, 6–4	(Peru) Christopher Li	(United States) Jack Kennedy (United States) Felix Corwin	(United States) Gavin Goode (United States) Maxwell Exsted (United States) Matisse Farzam (Netherlands) Stijn Paardekooper
November 10	Orlando, United States; Clay; M15; Singles and doubles draws	(United States) Felix Corwin (United States) Maxwell Exsted; 6–3, 6–1	(United States) Ryan Cozad (United States) Gavin Goode	(United States) Jack Kennedy (United States) Felix Corwin	(United States) Gavin Goode (United States) Maxwell Exsted (United States) Matisse Farzam (Netherlands) Stijn Paardekooper
November 10	Criciúma, Brazil; Clay; M15; Singles and doubles draws	(Brazil) Eduardo Ribeiro; 6–4, 6–3	(Brazil) José Pereira	(Argentina) Ezequiel Monferrer (Brazil) Wilson Leite	(Brazil) Pedro Sakamoto (Brazil) Nicolas Zanellato (Brazil) Paulo André Saraiva dos Santos (United States) Bruno Kuzuhara
November 10	Criciúma, Brazil; Clay; M15; Singles and doubles draws	(Brazil) João Victor Couto Loureiro (Brazil) Natan Rodrigues; 6–3, 5–7, [10–6]	(Brazil) José Pereira (Brazil) Paulo André Saraiva dos Santos	(Argentina) Ezequiel Monferrer (Brazil) Wilson Leite	(Brazil) Pedro Sakamoto (Brazil) Nicolas Zanellato (Brazil) Paulo André Saraiva dos Santos (United States) Bruno Kuzuhara
November 10	Azul, Argentina; Clay; M15; Singles and doubles draws	(Argentina) Juan Estévez; 6–4, 6–4	(Argentina) Valerio Aboian	(Argentina) Lorenzo Joaquín Rodríguez (Argentina) Luciano Emanuel Ambrogi	(Argentina) Lorenzo Gagliardo (Argentina) Carlos María Zárate (Argentina) Fermín Tenti (Argentina) Tomas Martinez
November 10	Azul, Argentina; Clay; M15; Singles and doubles draws	(Argentina) Luciano Emanuel Ambrogi (Argentina) Mateo del Pino; 6–2, 6–3	(Argentina) Franco Ribero (Argentina) Fermín Tenti	(Argentina) Lorenzo Joaquín Rodríguez (Argentina) Luciano Emanuel Ambrogi	(Argentina) Lorenzo Gagliardo (Argentina) Carlos María Zárate (Argentina) Fermín Tenti (Argentina) Tomas Martinez
November 17	Vale do Lobo, Portugal; Hard; M25; Singles and doubles draws	(United Kingdom) Alastair Gray; 6–1, 7–5	(Ukraine) Georgii Kravchenko	(Portugal) Tiago Cação (Sweden) Olle Wallin	(Germany) Sebastian Fanselow (Spain) Tomás Currás Abasolo (Netherlands) Ryan Nijboer (Italy) Tommaso Compagnucci
November 17	Vale do Lobo, Portugal; Hard; M25; Singles and doubles draws	(Portugal) Pedro Araújo (Portugal) Diogo Marques; 5–7, 6–2, [12–10]	(Portugal) João Graça (Portugal) Tiago Torres	(Portugal) Tiago Cação (Sweden) Olle Wallin	(Germany) Sebastian Fanselow (Spain) Tomás Currás Abasolo (Netherlands) Ryan Nijboer (Italy) Tommaso Compagnucci
November 17	Heraklion, Greece; Hard; M25; Singles and doubles draws	(South Africa) Philip Henning; 6–4, 7–5	(Greece) Ioannis Xilas	(United Kingdom) Harry Wendelken (France) Benjamin Pietri	(Sweden) Karl Friberg (Romania) Luca Preda (United States) Miles Jones (Slovenia) Filip Jeff Planinšek
November 17	Heraklion, Greece; Hard; M25; Singles and doubles draws	(United States) Alex Jones (United States) Miles Jones; 7–5, 7–5	(France) Thomas Kostka (France) Benjamin Pietri	(United Kingdom) Harry Wendelken (France) Benjamin Pietri	(Sweden) Karl Friberg (Romania) Luca Preda (United States) Miles Jones (Slovenia) Filip Jeff Planinšek
November 17	Antalya, Turkey; Clay; M25; Singles and doubles draws	(United Kingdom) Felix Gill; 6–2, 6–1	(Italy) Samuele Pieri	(Sweden) Dragoș Nicolae Mădăraș (Romania) Ștefan Adrian Andreescu	(Czech Republic) Martin Krumich (Serbia) Stefan Popović (Ukraine) Oleksandr Ovcharenko; Andrey Chepelev
November 17	Antalya, Turkey; Clay; M25; Singles and doubles draws	(Serbia) Marko Maksimović (Serbia) Stefan Popović; 6–4, 6–1	(Romania) Dragoș Nicolae Cazacu (Belgium) Martin van der Meerschen	(Sweden) Dragoș Nicolae Mădăraș (Romania) Ștefan Adrian Andreescu	(Czech Republic) Martin Krumich (Serbia) Stefan Popović (Ukraine) Oleksandr Ovcharenko; Andrey Chepelev
November 17	Luanda, Angola; Hard; M25; Singles and doubles draws	(France) Florent Bax; 7–6^{(7–3)}, 6–3	(Netherlands) Max Houkes	(France) Arthur Nagel (Germany) Marc Majdandzic	(France) Yanis Ghazouani Durand (France) Mikael Alimli (Germany) Kai Wehnelt (France) Constantin Bittoun Kouzmine
November 17	Luanda, Angola; Hard; M25; Singles and doubles draws	(Latvia) Robert Strombachs (Germany) Kai Wehnelt; 6–3, 6–1	(Poland) Alan Bojarski (Morocco) Yassine Smiej	(France) Arthur Nagel (Germany) Marc Majdandzic	(France) Yanis Ghazouani Durand (France) Mikael Alimli (Germany) Kai Wehnelt (France) Constantin Bittoun Kouzmine
November 17	Austin, United States; Hard; M25; Singles and doubles draws	(United Kingdom) Lui Maxted; 6–2, 6–3	(Norway) Andreja Petrovic	(United States) Garrett Johns (United Kingdom) Aidan McHugh	(United States) Micah Braswell (France) Mathis Bondaz (Spain) Julian Alonso (Croatia) Noa Vukadin
November 17	Austin, United States; Hard; M25; Singles and doubles draws	(United States) Pranav Kumar (United Kingdom) Lui Maxted; 6–7^{(5–7)}, 6–4, [10–8]	(Ghana) Abraham Asaba (Spain) Àlex Martínez	(United States) Garrett Johns (United Kingdom) Aidan McHugh	(United States) Micah Braswell (France) Mathis Bondaz (Spain) Julian Alonso (Croatia) Noa Vukadin
November 17	Cochabamba, Bolivia; Clay; M25; Singles and doubles draws	(Italy) Matteo Covato; 7–5, 7–6^{(7–5)}	(Colombia) Samuel Heredia	(Colombia) Daniel Salazar (Argentina) Tomás Farjat	(Chile) Nicolás Bruna (Colombia) Samuel Alejandro Linde Palacios (Brazil) João Vítor Scramin do Lago (Argentina) Valerio Aboian
November 17	Cochabamba, Bolivia; Clay; M25; Singles and doubles draws	(Argentina) Valerio Aboian (Argentina) Tomás Farjat; 6–4, 6–2	(Bolivia) Agustín Eduardo Cuéllar Lorberg (Bolivia) Leonardo Suarez	(Colombia) Daniel Salazar (Argentina) Tomás Farjat	(Chile) Nicolás Bruna (Colombia) Samuel Alejandro Linde Palacios (Brazil) João Vítor Scramin do Lago (Argentina) Valerio Aboian
November 17	Kuala Lumpur, Malaysia; Hard; M15; Singles and doubles draws	(Poland) Karol Filar; 6–3, 7–6^{(7–3)}	(Japan) Yuta Kawahashi	(Indonesia) Muhammad Rifqi Fitriadi (Australia) Chase Ferguson	(United States) Evan Zhu (New Zealand) Corban Crowther (Thailand) Thantub Suksumrarn (Thailand) Markus Malaszszak
November 17	Kuala Lumpur, Malaysia; Hard; M15; Singles and doubles draws	(Indonesia) Muhammad Rifqi Fitriadi (Indonesia) Christopher Rungkat; 4–6, 6–3, [12–10]	(Philippines) Francis Alcantara (Australia) Chase Ferguson	(Indonesia) Muhammad Rifqi Fitriadi (Australia) Chase Ferguson	(United States) Evan Zhu (New Zealand) Corban Crowther (Thailand) Thantub Suksumrarn (Thailand) Markus Malaszszak
November 17	Gimcheon, South Korea; Hard; M15; Singles and doubles draws	(South Korea) Kim Dong-ju; 6–0, 7–6^{(7–4)}	(South Korea) Chu Seok-hyeon	(Chinese Taipei) Lee Kuan-yi (United States) Theodore Dean	(South Korea) Lee Jun-hyun (Japan) Toshiki Karigyo (South Korea) Chung Yun-seong (Japan) Keisuke Saitoh
November 17	Gimcheon, South Korea; Hard; M15; Singles and doubles draws	(United States) Theodore Dean (United States) Hugo Hashimoto; 6–4, 7–6^{(10–8)}	(South Korea) Cho Seong-woo (South Korea) Sim Sung-been	(Chinese Taipei) Lee Kuan-yi (United States) Theodore Dean	(South Korea) Lee Jun-hyun (Japan) Toshiki Karigyo (South Korea) Chung Yun-seong (Japan) Keisuke Saitoh
November 17	Bhubaneswar, India; Hard; M15; Singles and doubles draws	(India) S D Prajwal Dev; 7–6^{(7–4)}, 7–6^{(7–1)}	(India) Digvijaypratap Singh	(India) Kabir Hans (India) Manish Sureshkumar	(Ukraine) Vadym Konovchuk; Timofei Derepasko (India) Dev Javia (India) Rohan Mehra
November 17	Bhubaneswar, India; Hard; M15; Singles and doubles draws	(India) Siddhant Banthia (India) S D Prajwal Dev; 7–6^{(7–5)}, 6–2	(India) Madhwin Kamath (India) Rohan Mehra	(India) Kabir Hans (India) Manish Sureshkumar	(Ukraine) Vadym Konovchuk; Timofei Derepasko (India) Dev Javia (India) Rohan Mehra
November 17	Alcalá de Henares, Spain; Hard; M15; Singles and doubles draws	(Netherlands) Abel Forger; 7–6^{(7–3)}, 6–4	(France) Cyril Vandermeersch	Yaroslav Demin (Italy) Gabriele Bosio	(Netherlands) Pieter De Lange (Spain) Carles Hernández (Spain) Benjamín Winter López (Belgium) Pierre-Yves Bailly
November 17	Alcalá de Henares, Spain; Hard; M15; Singles and doubles draws	(Spain) Izan Almazán Valiente (Spain) Benjamín Winter López; 6–3, 6–1	(Netherlands) Pieter De Lange (Netherlands) Abel Forger	Yaroslav Demin (Italy) Gabriele Bosio	(Netherlands) Pieter De Lange (Spain) Carles Hernández (Spain) Benjamín Winter López (Belgium) Pierre-Yves Bailly
November 17	Sharm El Sheikh, Egypt; Hard; M15; Singles and doubles draws	(Serbia) Ognjen Milić; 7–6^{(7–2)}, 6–2	Grigoriy Shebekin	(Switzerland) Luca Staeheli (Netherlands) Brian Bozemoj	(Belgium) Romain Faucon (Italy) Samuel Vincent Ruggeri (Kazakhstan) Zangar Nurlanuly (Italy) Leonardo Rossi
November 17	Sharm El Sheikh, Egypt; Hard; M15; Singles and doubles draws	Ivan Gretskiy; Grigoriy Shebekin; 5–7, 6–4, [10–4]	(Belgium) Romain Faucon (Ukraine) Volodymyr Uzhylovskyi	(Switzerland) Luca Staeheli (Netherlands) Brian Bozemoj	(Belgium) Romain Faucon (Italy) Samuel Vincent Ruggeri (Kazakhstan) Zangar Nurlanuly (Italy) Leonardo Rossi
November 17	Monastir, Tunisia; Hard; M15; Singles and doubles draws	(Kazakhstan) Amir Omarkhanov; 6–3, 3–6, 6–4	(Germany) Max Schönhaus	(Australia) Chen Dong (Germany) Mika Petkovic	(France) Thomas Faurel (Algeria) Toufik Sahtali (Germany) Luca Wiedenmann (Spain) Jorge Plans
November 17	Monastir, Tunisia; Hard; M15; Singles and doubles draws	(Turkey) S Mert Özdemir (Turkey) Mert Naci Türker; 7–6^{(10–8)}, 7–6^{(7–4)}	(Germany) Mika Petkovic (Germany) Max Schönhaus	(Australia) Chen Dong (Germany) Mika Petkovic	(France) Thomas Faurel (Algeria) Toufik Sahtali (Germany) Luca Wiedenmann (Spain) Jorge Plans
November 17	Tallahassee, United States; Clay; M15; Singles and doubles draws	(United States) Keegan Smith; 6–3, 6–3	(United States) Ryan Fishback	(United States) Noah Zamora (Germany) Maik Steiner	(United States) Victor Lilov (United Kingdom) James Connel (Netherlands) Stijn Paardekooper (Spain) Mario Martínez Serrano
November 17	Tallahassee, United States; Clay; M15; Singles and doubles draws	(United States) Evan Bynoe (United States) Keegan Smith; 6–2, 6–2	(Italy) Niccolò Baroni (Spain) Mario Martínez Serrano	(United States) Noah Zamora (Germany) Maik Steiner	(United States) Victor Lilov (United Kingdom) James Connel (Netherlands) Stijn Paardekooper (Spain) Mario Martínez Serrano
November 17	Olavarria, Argentina; Clay; M15; Singles and doubles draws	(Argentina) Dante Pagani; 7–5, 5–7, 6–1	(Argentina) Bautista Vilicich	(Argentina) Lautaro Agustín Falabella (Argentina) Felipe de Dios	(Argentina) Ignacio Monzón (Argentina) Mateo del Pino (Argentina) Ignacio Novo (Argentina) Fermín Tenti
November 17	Olavarria, Argentina; Clay; M15; Singles and doubles draws	(Argentina) Lautaro Agustín Falabella (Argentina) Manuel Mouilleron Salvo; 6–4, 6–1	(Argentina) Fermín Tenti (Argentina) Bautista Vilicich	(Argentina) Lautaro Agustín Falabella (Argentina) Felipe de Dios	(Argentina) Ignacio Monzón (Argentina) Mateo del Pino (Argentina) Ignacio Novo (Argentina) Fermín Tenti
November 17	Santiago, Chile; Clay; M15; Singles and doubles draws	(Chile) Daniel Antonio Núñez; 6–3, 6–4	(Chile) Benjamín Torrealba	(Chile) Bastián Malla (Mexico) Rodrigo Alujas	(United States) Felix Corwin (Chile) Amador Salazar (Chile) Nicolás Villalón (Chile) Benjamín Torres
November 17	Santiago, Chile; Clay; M15; Singles and doubles draws	(Chile) Ignacio António Becerra Otarola (Chile) Daniel Antonio Núñez; 1–6, 6–3, [10–6]	(Chile) Benjamín Torrealba (Chile) Nicolás Villalón	(Chile) Bastián Malla (Mexico) Rodrigo Alujas	(United States) Felix Corwin (Chile) Amador Salazar (Chile) Nicolás Villalón (Chile) Benjamín Torres
November 24	Bhopal, India; Hard; M25; Singles and doubles draws	(India) Digvijaypratap Singh; 6–4, 7–6^{(8–6)}	(India) Nitin Kumar Sinha	(India) S D Prajwal Dev (India) Siddhant Banthia	(India) Manish Sureshkumar (Kazakhstan) Grigoriy Lomakin (India) Rohan Mehra (India) Udit Kamboj
November 24	Bhopal, India; Hard; M25; Singles and doubles draws	(India) Aryan Shah (India) Atharva Sharma; 1–6, 6–4, [10–6]	(India) S D Prajwal Dev (India) Nitin Kumar Sinha	(India) S D Prajwal Dev (India) Siddhant Banthia	(India) Manish Sureshkumar (Kazakhstan) Grigoriy Lomakin (India) Rohan Mehra (India) Udit Kamboj
November 24	Hradec Králové, Czech Republic; Hard (i); M25; Singles and doubles draws	(Belgium) Buvaysar Gadamauri; 1–6, 6–3, 6–0	(Czech Republic) Daniel Siniakov	(United Kingdom) Liam Broady (United Kingdom) Charles Broom	(Czech Republic) Jakub Filip (Netherlands) Alec Deckers (Romania) Gabriel Ghețu (Republic of Ireland) Michael Agwi
November 24	Hradec Králové, Czech Republic; Hard (i); M25; Singles and doubles draws	(Czech Republic) Dominik Reček (Czech Republic) Daniel Siniakov; 6–4, 6–4	(United Kingdom) Anton Matusevich (United Kingdom) Matthew Short	(United Kingdom) Liam Broady (United Kingdom) Charles Broom	(Czech Republic) Jakub Filip (Netherlands) Alec Deckers (Romania) Gabriel Ghețu (Republic of Ireland) Michael Agwi
November 24	Heraklion, Greece; Hard; M25; Singles and doubles draws	(Germany) Florian Broska; 7–6^{(7–3)}, 6–1	(Italy) Fausto Tabacco	(Israel) Olek Shimanov (South Africa) Marc van der Merwe	(United States) Keshav Chopra (Italy) Giulio Perego (Israel) Amit Vales (Slovenia) Aljaz Jeran
November 24	Heraklion, Greece; Hard; M25; Singles and doubles draws	(United States) Keshav Chopra (Italy) Giulio Perego; 4–6, 6–1, [10–8]	(Italy) Filippo Romano (Italy) Gabriele Volpi	(Israel) Olek Shimanov (South Africa) Marc van der Merwe	(United States) Keshav Chopra (Italy) Giulio Perego (Israel) Amit Vales (Slovenia) Aljaz Jeran
November 24	Antalya, Turkey; Clay; M25; Singles and doubles draws	(Bosnia and Herzegovina) Andrej Nedić; 4–6, 6–0, 6–2	(Germany) Tim Handel	(Sweden) Dragoș Nicolae Mădăraș; Andrey Chepelev	(Italy) Francesco Forti (Serbia) Dušan Obradović (Bulgaria) George Lazarov (Poland) Marcel Zieliński
November 24	Antalya, Turkey; Clay; M25; Singles and doubles draws	(Serbia) Marko Maksimović (Serbia) Stefan Popović; 2–6, 7–5, [10–7]	(Republic of Ireland) Charles Barry (Ukraine) Oleksandr Ovcharenko	(Sweden) Dragoș Nicolae Mădăraș; Andrey Chepelev	(Italy) Francesco Forti (Serbia) Dušan Obradović (Bulgaria) George Lazarov (Poland) Marcel Zieliński
November 24	Luanda, Angola; Hard; M25; Singles and doubles draws	(Latvia) Robert Strombachs; 7–6^{(7–2)}, 4–6, 6–4	(Netherlands) Max Houkes	(Hungary) Matyas Fuele (France) Florent Bax	(Germany) Marc Majdandzic (Poland) Kacper Szymkowiak (France) Arthur Nagel (Germany) Kai Wehnelt
November 24	Luanda, Angola; Hard; M25; Singles and doubles draws	(Latvia) Robert Strombachs (Germany) Kai Wehnelt; 6–2, 6–4	(France) Sven Corbinais (Belgium) Nicolas Ifi	(Hungary) Matyas Fuele (France) Florent Bax	(Germany) Marc Majdandzic (Poland) Kacper Szymkowiak (France) Arthur Nagel (Germany) Kai Wehnelt
November 24	Gimcheon, South Korea; Hard; M15; Singles and doubles draws	(United States) Braden Shick; 6–1, 6–1	(United States) Theodore Dean	(South Korea) Chung Yun-seong (South Korea) Kim Geun-jun	(South Korea) Shin San-hui (Japan) Sora Fukuda (Japan) Keisuke Saitoh (South Korea) Shin Woo-bin
November 24	Gimcheon, South Korea; Hard; M15; Singles and doubles draws	(South Korea) Jang Yun-seok (South Korea) Kim Dong-ju; 6–2, 7–6^{(7–4)}	(South Korea) Chung Yun-seong (South Korea) Hyun Jun-ha	(South Korea) Chung Yun-seong (South Korea) Kim Geun-jun	(South Korea) Shin San-hui (Japan) Sora Fukuda (Japan) Keisuke Saitoh (South Korea) Shin Woo-bin
November 24	Phan Thiết, Vietnam; Hard; M15; Singles and doubles draws	(France) Arthur Weber; 6–0, 6–3	(Thailand) Thanapet Chanta	(Australia) Chase Ferguson (Italy) Lorenzo Lorusso	(Poland) Karol Filar (Indonesia) Muhammad Rifqi Fitriadi (Australia) Lachlan McFadzean (Thailand) Pawit Sornlaksup
November 24	Phan Thiết, Vietnam; Hard; M15; Singles and doubles draws	(Indonesia) Muhammad Rifqi Fitriadi (Indonesia) Christopher Rungkat; 6–4, 6–3	(Thailand) Thanapet Chanta (Thailand) Pawit Sornlaksup	(Australia) Chase Ferguson (Italy) Lorenzo Lorusso	(Poland) Karol Filar (Indonesia) Muhammad Rifqi Fitriadi (Australia) Lachlan McFadzean (Thailand) Pawit Sornlaksup
November 24	Madrid, Spain; Hard; M15; Singles and doubles draws	(France) Cyril Vandermeersch; 6–3, 7–6^{(7–3)}	(Spain) Izan Almazán Valiente	(Denmark) Christian Sigsgaard (Spain) Pedro Ródenas	(Switzerland) Patrick Schoen (Belgium) Pierre-Yves Bailly (Netherlands) Michiel de Krom; Yaroslav Demin
November 24	Madrid, Spain; Hard; M15; Singles and doubles draws	Aleksander Chayka (Norway) Leyton Rivera; 6–4, 1–6, [10–3]	(Spain) Izan Almazán Valiente (Spain) Benjamín Winter López	(Denmark) Christian Sigsgaard (Spain) Pedro Ródenas	(Switzerland) Patrick Schoen (Belgium) Pierre-Yves Bailly (Netherlands) Michiel de Krom; Yaroslav Demin
November 24	Sharm El Sheikh, Egypt; Hard; M15; Singles and doubles draws	(Serbia) Ognjen Milić; 7–6^{(7–3)}, 6–7^{(5–7)}, 6–2	Erik Arutiunian	(Belgium) Romain Faucon (Poland) Fryderyk Lechno-Wasiutyński	(Thailand) Wishaya Trongcharoenchaikul; Grigoriy Shebekin; Evgeny Philippov (Czech Republic) Jan Hrazdil
November 24	Sharm El Sheikh, Egypt; Hard; M15; Singles and doubles draws	(Belgium) Romain Faucon (Ukraine) Volodymyr Uzhylovskyi; 6–4, 6–2	(Netherlands) Brian Bozemoj (Netherlands) Stijn Pel	(Belgium) Romain Faucon (Poland) Fryderyk Lechno-Wasiutyński	(Thailand) Wishaya Trongcharoenchaikul; Grigoriy Shebekin; Evgeny Philippov (Czech Republic) Jan Hrazdil
November 24	Monastir, Tunisia; Hard; M15; Singles and doubles draws	(France) Thomas Faurel; 3–6, 7–5, 7–5	(Morocco) Karim Bennani	(Kazakhstan) Amir Omarkhanov (Turkey) Mert Naci Türker	(France) Theo Hermann (India) Chirag Duhan (Italy) Lorenzo Rottoli (Germany) Luca Wiedenmann
November 24	Monastir, Tunisia; Hard; M15; Singles and doubles draws	Igor Kudriashov (Italy) Victor Paganetti; Walkover	(Estonia) Markus Mölder (Tunisia) Adam Nagoudi	(Kazakhstan) Amir Omarkhanov (Turkey) Mert Naci Türker	(France) Theo Hermann (India) Chirag Duhan (Italy) Lorenzo Rottoli (Germany) Luca Wiedenmann
November 24	Ribeirão Preto, Brazil; Clay; M15; Singles and doubles draws	(Brazil) Nicolas Oliveira; 6–4, 4–6, 6–3	(Brazil) José Pereira	(Brazil) João Victor Couto Loureiro (Argentina) Nicolás García Longo	(Brazil) Ryan Augusto dos Santos (Brazil) Enzo Camargo Lima (Brazil) Jefferson Wendler Filho (Brazil) Nicolas Zanellato
November 24	Ribeirão Preto, Brazil; Clay; M15; Singles and doubles draws	(Brazil) Enzo Camargo Lima (Brazil) Gabriel Schenekenberg; 6–2, 3–6, [10–6]	(Brazil) João Victor Couto Loureiro (Brazil) Natan Rodrigues	(Brazil) João Victor Couto Loureiro (Argentina) Nicolás García Longo	(Brazil) Ryan Augusto dos Santos (Brazil) Enzo Camargo Lima (Brazil) Jefferson Wendler Filho (Brazil) Nicolas Zanellato
November 24	La Paz, Bolivia; Clay; M15; Singles and doubles draws	(Argentina) Tomás Farjat; 6–3, 6–4	(Brazil) João Vitor Scramin do Lago	(Argentina) Thiago Agustin Pernas (Bolivia) Santiago Lora	(Bolivia) Diego Eduardo Muñoz Navia (Bolivia) Oliver Andre Solis Encinas (Brazil) Henrique Ortenblad Nogueira (Argentina) Valentino Conte
November 24	La Paz, Bolivia; Clay; M15; Singles and doubles draws	(Italy) Matteo Covato (United States) Gray Voelzke; 7–6^{(8–6)}, 7–6^{(7–0)}	(Argentina) Valentino Grippo (Colombia) Nicolas Esteban Rico Arias	(Argentina) Thiago Agustin Pernas (Bolivia) Santiago Lora	(Bolivia) Diego Eduardo Muñoz Navia (Bolivia) Oliver Andre Solis Encinas (Brazil) Henrique Ortenblad Nogueira (Argentina) Valentino Conte
November 24	Santiago, Chile; Clay; M15; Singles and doubles draws	(Argentina) Juan Estévez; 7–5, 6–3	(Uruguay) Joaquín Aguilar Cardozo	(Argentina) Ignacio Monzón (United States) Felix Corwin	(Mexico) Rodrigo Alujas (Germany) Alessio Vasquez (Peru) Christopher Li (Argentina) Máximo Zeitune
November 24	Santiago, Chile; Clay; M15; Singles and doubles draws	(Uruguay) Joaquín Aguilar Cardozo (Argentina) Máximo Zeitune; 6–4, 3–6, [10–8]	(Argentina) Santiago Pedro Franchini (Brazil) Jackson Pereira Xavier	(Argentina) Ignacio Monzón (United States) Felix Corwin	(Mexico) Rodrigo Alujas (Germany) Alessio Vasquez (Peru) Christopher Li (Argentina) Máximo Zeitune

=== December ===
Week of	Tournament	Winner	Runners-up	Semifinalists	Quarterfinalists
December 1	Phan Thiết, Vietnam; Hard; M15; Singles and doubles draws	(France) Arthur Weber; 6–4, 6–4	(United States) Braden Shick	(Australia) Lachlan McFadzean (Poland) Karol Filar	(Thailand) Thanapet Chanta (Japan) Yuto Oki (Saudi Arabia) Ammar Alhogbani (Czech Republic) Dominik Palán
December 1	Phan Thiết, Vietnam; Hard; M15; Singles and doubles draws	(United States) Braden Shick (Netherlands) Fons van Sambeek; 6–1, 6–3	(Australia) Stefan Storch (United States) Azuma Visaya	(Australia) Lachlan McFadzean (Poland) Karol Filar	(Thailand) Thanapet Chanta (Japan) Yuto Oki (Saudi Arabia) Ammar Alhogbani (Czech Republic) Dominik Palán
December 1	Gwalior, India; Hard; M15; Singles and doubles draws	(India) Digvijaypratap Singh; 6–2, 4–0 ret.	(India) Maan Kesharwani	(India) Aryan Shah (India) Rohan Mehra	(India) Abhinav Sanjeev Shanmugam (Kazakhstan) Grigoriy Lomakin (India) Raghav Jaisinghani (India) Nitin Kumar Sinha
December 1	Gwalior, India; Hard; M15; Singles and doubles draws	(India) Aryan Shah (India) Atharva Sharma; 2–6, 6–3, [11–9]	(India) Ishaque Eqbal (Kazakhstan) Grigoriy Lomakin	(India) Aryan Shah (India) Rohan Mehra	(India) Abhinav Sanjeev Shanmugam (Kazakhstan) Grigoriy Lomakin (India) Raghav Jaisinghani (India) Nitin Kumar Sinha
December 1	Madrid, Spain; Clay; M15; Singles and doubles draws	(Spain) Max Alcalá Gurri; 6–2, 6–4	(Romania) Ștefan Paloși	(Portugal) Tiago Torres (Spain) Carlos López Montagud	(Spain) Alejo Sánchez Quílez (Chile) Diego Fernández Flores (Romania) Nicholas David Ionel (Spain) Mario González Fernández
December 1	Madrid, Spain; Clay; M15; Singles and doubles draws	(Spain) John Echeverria (Portugal) Tiago Torres; 4–6, 7–6^{(7–4)}, [10–8]	(Spain) Ignasi Forcano (Spain) Benjamín Winter López	(Portugal) Tiago Torres (Spain) Carlos López Montagud	(Spain) Alejo Sánchez Quílez (Chile) Diego Fernández Flores (Romania) Nicholas David Ionel (Spain) Mario González Fernández
December 1	Antalya, Turkey; Clay; M15; Singles and doubles draws	(Sweden) Dragoș Nicolae Mădăraș; 6–2, 6–1	(Morocco) Yassine Dlimi	(Spain) Imanol López Morillo (United States) Maxwell Exsted	(Italy) Giacomo Crisostomo; Ivan Nedelko (Italy) Andrea Fiorentini (Slovenia) Miha Vetrih
December 1	Antalya, Turkey; Clay; M15; Singles and doubles draws	(Romania) Alexandru Cristian Dumitru (Turkey) Gökberk Sarıtaş; 6–4, 3–6, [11–9]	(Turkey) Arda Azkara (United States) Ozan Baris	(Spain) Imanol López Morillo (United States) Maxwell Exsted	(Italy) Giacomo Crisostomo; Ivan Nedelko (Italy) Andrea Fiorentini (Slovenia) Miha Vetrih
December 1	Sharm El Sheikh, Egypt; Hard; M15; Singles and doubles draws	(Ukraine) Vadym Ursu; 6–3, 6–2	(Egypt) Fares Zakaria	Erik Arutiunian; Artur Kukasian	(Georgia (country)) Saba Purtseladze (Egypt) Michael Bassem Sobhy (Czech Republic) Jan Hrazdil (South Africa) Philip Henning
December 1	Sharm El Sheikh, Egypt; Hard; M15; Singles and doubles draws	(Ukraine) Aleksandr Braynin (Ukraine) Georgii Kravchenko; 7–5, 5–5 ret.	(Cyprus) Melios Efstathiou (Cyprus) Eleftherios Neos	Erik Arutiunian; Artur Kukasian	(Georgia (country)) Saba Purtseladze (Egypt) Michael Bassem Sobhy (Czech Republic) Jan Hrazdil (South Africa) Philip Henning
December 1	Monastir, Tunisia; Hard; M15; Singles and doubles draws	(France) Robin Bertrand; 6–2, 7–6^{(7–5)}	(Greece) Dimitris Sakellaridis	(India) Manas Dhamne (Algeria) Toufik Sahtali	(United States) Mwendwa Mbithi (Tunisia) Aziz Ouakaa (Belgium) Tibo Colson (Algeria) Samir Hamza Reguig
December 1	Monastir, Tunisia; Hard; M15; Singles and doubles draws	(Morocco) Karim Bennani (Tunisia) Alaa Trifi; 6–4, 6–4	(Italy) Andrea Colombo (Italy) Fausto Tabacco	(India) Manas Dhamne (Algeria) Toufik Sahtali	(United States) Mwendwa Mbithi (Tunisia) Aziz Ouakaa (Belgium) Tibo Colson (Algeria) Samir Hamza Reguig
December 1	Lima, Peru; Clay; M15; Singles and doubles draws	(Argentina) Juan Estévez; 1–6, 7–6^{(9–7)}, 5–2 ret.	(Argentina) Lorenzo Joaquín Rodríguez	(France) Pierre Delage (United States) Toby Kodat	(United States) Strong Kirchheimer (Argentina) Thiago Cigarrán (South Korea) Gerard Campaña Lee (United States) Ryan Fishback
December 1	Lima, Peru; Clay; M15; Singles and doubles draws	(Argentina) Thiago Cigarrán (Argentina) Lorenzo Joaquín Rodríguez; 6–4, 6–1	(Peru) Vicente Monge (Peru) Luis José Nakamine	(France) Pierre Delage (United States) Toby Kodat	(United States) Strong Kirchheimer (Argentina) Thiago Cigarrán (South Korea) Gerard Campaña Lee (United States) Ryan Fishback
December 8	Hamilton, New Zealand; Hard; M15; Singles and doubles draws	(New Zealand) Anton Shepp; 6–2, 7–6^{(12–10)}	(Australia) Tai Sach	(United States) Christian Langmo (United States) Keegan Smith	(New Zealand) Isaac Becroft (Australia) Duje Markovina (New Zealand) Jack Loutit (Australia) Daniel Jovanovski
December 8	Hamilton, New Zealand; Hard; M15; Singles and doubles draws	(Australia) Daniel Jovanovski (Australia) Tai Sach; 7–6^{(10–8)}, 6–4	(Australia) Calum Puttergill (United States) Keegan Smith	(United States) Christian Langmo (United States) Keegan Smith	(New Zealand) Isaac Becroft (Australia) Duje Markovina (New Zealand) Jack Loutit (Australia) Daniel Jovanovski
December 8	Ceuta, Spain; Hard; M15; Singles and doubles draws	Singles and doubles competition was cancelled due to ongoing poor weather			
December 8	Antalya, Turkey; Clay; M15; Singles and doubles draws	(Sweden) Dragoș Nicolae Mădăraș; 6–0, 4–6, 7–5	(Germany) Michel Hopp	(Netherlands) Michiel de Krom (United States) Ozan Baris	(Italy) Alessandro Bellifemine (United States) Maxwell Exsted (Italy) Andrea Fiorentini (Spain) Alejo Sánchez Quílez
December 8	Antalya, Turkey; Clay; M15; Singles and doubles draws	(Netherlands) Michiel de Krom (Chile) Diego Fernández Flores; 6–2, 3–6, [13–11]	(Turkey) Arda Azkara (United States) Ozan Baris	(Netherlands) Michiel de Krom (United States) Ozan Baris	(Italy) Alessandro Bellifemine (United States) Maxwell Exsted (Italy) Andrea Fiorentini (Spain) Alejo Sánchez Quílez
December 8	Sharm El Sheikh, Egypt; Hard; M15; Singles and doubles draws	(South Africa) Philip Henning; 6–3, 6–3	(Belgium) Pierre-Yves Bailly	(Ukraine) Georgii Kravchenko (Ukraine) Aleksandr Braynin	(Serbia) Marko Milosavljević (United States) Michael Zhu (Austria) Niklas Waldner (United Kingdom) Luke Hooper
December 8	Sharm El Sheikh, Egypt; Hard; M15; Singles and doubles draws	(Ukraine) Volodymyr Uzhylovskyi (Italy) Samuel Vincent Ruggeri; 6–2, 7–5	(Ukraine) Aleksandr Braynin (Ukraine) Georgii Kravchenko	(Ukraine) Georgii Kravchenko (Ukraine) Aleksandr Braynin	(Serbia) Marko Milosavljević (United States) Michael Zhu (Austria) Niklas Waldner (United Kingdom) Luke Hooper
December 8	Monastir, Tunisia; Hard; M15; Singles and doubles draws	(Switzerland) Patrick Schoen; 6–1, 6–1	(Italy) Federico Iannaccone	(United Kingdom) Oliver Bonding (Germany) Maik Steiner	(Tunisia) Alaa Trifi (France) Felix Balshaw (Italy) Andrea Colombo (France) Robin Bertrand
December 8	Monastir, Tunisia; Hard; M15; Singles and doubles draws	(Algeria) Samir Hamza Reguig (Tunisia) Aziz Ouakaa; 7–6^{(8–6)}, 4–6, [11–9]	(United Kingdom) Oliver Bonding (Switzerland) Patrick Schoen	(United Kingdom) Oliver Bonding (Germany) Maik Steiner	(Tunisia) Alaa Trifi (France) Felix Balshaw (Italy) Andrea Colombo (France) Robin Bertrand
December 8	Lima, Peru; Clay; M15; Singles and doubles draws	(Spain) Oriol Roca Batalla; 6–4, 6–4	(France) Pierre Delage	(Nicaragua) Joaquín Guilleme (Argentina) Valerio Aboian	(Argentina) Lorenzo Joaquín Rodríguez (United States) Ryan Dickerson (Peru) Christopher Li (United States) Toby Kodat
December 8	Lima, Peru; Clay; M15; Singles and doubles draws	(Peru) Christopher Li (United States) Victor Lilov; 1–6, 6–3, [10–4]	(Chile) Nicolás Bruna (Argentina) Rocco Valente	(Nicaragua) Joaquín Guilleme (Argentina) Valerio Aboian	(Argentina) Lorenzo Joaquín Rodríguez (United States) Ryan Dickerson (Peru) Christopher Li (United States) Toby Kodat
December 15	Tauranga, New Zealand; Hard; M15; Singles and doubles draws	(United States) Keegan Smith; 6–3, 6–2	(United States) Christian Langmo	(Australia) Tai Sach (United States) Preston Brown	(New Zealand) Corban Crowther (Australia) Jacob Bradshaw (Australia) Jake Dembo (Japan) Shu Matsuoka
December 15	Tauranga, New Zealand; Hard; M15; Singles and doubles draws	(Australia) Jesse Delaney (United Kingdom) Emile Hudd; 6–2, 6–2	(New Zealand) Ajeet Rai (New Zealand) Anton Shepp	(Australia) Tai Sach (United States) Preston Brown	(New Zealand) Corban Crowther (Australia) Jacob Bradshaw (Australia) Jake Dembo (Japan) Shu Matsuoka
December 15	Antalya, Turkey; Clay; M15; Singles and doubles draws	(Italy) Samuele Pieri; 6–1, 6–1	Ivan Nedelko	(United States) Ozan Baris (Italy) Giannicola Misasi	(Austria) Alexander Wagner (Japan) Hiromasa Koyama (Spain) Imanol López Morillo (Morocco) Reda Bennani
December 15	Antalya, Turkey; Clay; M15; Singles and doubles draws	(Romania) Alexandru Cristian Dumitru (Sweden) Dragoș Nicolae Mădăraș; 6–3, 7–6^{(7–3)}	(Italy) Lorenzo Ferri (Italy) Giannicola Misasi	(United States) Ozan Baris (Italy) Giannicola Misasi	(Austria) Alexander Wagner (Japan) Hiromasa Koyama (Spain) Imanol López Morillo (Morocco) Reda Bennani
December 15	Monastir, Tunisia; Hard; M15; Singles and doubles draws	(France) Cyril Vandermeersch; 2–6, 6–4, 7–5	(Germany) Luca Wiedenmann	(Switzerland) Patrick Schoen (Italy) Gabriele Bosio	(France) Moïse Kouamé (United Kingdom) Oliver Bonding (Italy) Tobia Baragiola Mordini (Australia) Chen Dong
December 15	Monastir, Tunisia; Hard; M15; Singles and doubles draws	(France) Moïse Kouamé (Italy) Tommaso Pedretti; 7–5, 6–1	(France) Felix Balshaw (Romania) Mihai Alexandru Coman	(Switzerland) Patrick Schoen (Italy) Gabriele Bosio	(France) Moïse Kouamé (United Kingdom) Oliver Bonding (Italy) Tobia Baragiola Mordini (Australia) Chen Dong
December 15	Lima, Peru; Clay; M15; Singles and doubles draws	(Spain) Oriol Roca Batalla; 7–5, 7–5	(Brazil) Enzo Kohlmann de Freitas	(South Korea) Gerard Campaña Lee (Argentina) Thiago Agustin Pernas	(United States) Toby Kodat (United States) Ryan Dickerson (Argentina) Bautista Vilicich (France) Pierre Delage
December 15	Lima, Peru; Clay; M15; Singles and doubles draws	(Mexico) Rafael de Alba (United States) Ryan Dickerson; 3–6, 6–3, [12–10]	(Peru) Vicente Monge (Peru) Luis José Nakamine	(South Korea) Gerard Campaña Lee (Argentina) Thiago Agustin Pernas	(United States) Toby Kodat (United States) Ryan Dickerson (Argentina) Bautista Vilicich (France) Pierre Delage
December 22	Antalya, Turkey; Clay; M15; Singles and doubles draws	(Sweden) Dragoș Nicolae Mădăraș; 6–3, 6–0	(Ukraine) Oleksandr Ovcharenko	(Romania) Filip Cristian Jianu; Ivan Nedelko	(Italy) William Mirarchi (Bulgaria) Dinko Dinev (Romania) Mihai Răzvan Marinescu (Romania) Dragoș Nicolae Cazacu
December 22	Antalya, Turkey; Clay; M15; Singles and doubles draws	(Germany) Taym Al Azmeh (United States) Ozan Baris; 6–4, 7–6^{(7–1)}	(Japan) Hiromasa Koyama (Japan) Shu Muto	(Romania) Filip Cristian Jianu; Ivan Nedelko	(Italy) William Mirarchi (Bulgaria) Dinko Dinev (Romania) Mihai Răzvan Marinescu (Romania) Dragoș Nicolae Cazacu
December 22	Monastir, Tunisia; Hard; M15; Singles and doubles draws	(Bulgaria) Petr Nesterov; 6–1, 6–4	(India) Manas Dhamne	(France) Nicolas Tepmahc (France) Moïse Kouamé	(Australia) Chen Dong (Italy) Juan Cruz Martin Manzano (Germany) Mika Petkovic (Italy) Felipe Virgili Berini
December 22	Monastir, Tunisia; Hard; M15; Singles and doubles draws	(Tunisia) Adam Nagoudi (Bulgaria) Petr Nesterov; 7–5, 6–7^{(4–7)}, [11–9]	(Italy) Stefano Papagno (Italy) Felipe Virgili Berini	(France) Nicolas Tepmahc (France) Moïse Kouamé	(Australia) Chen Dong (Italy) Juan Cruz Martin Manzano (Germany) Mika Petkovic (Italy) Felipe Virgili Berini
December 22	Agadir, Morocco; Clay; M15; Singles and doubles draws	(Germany) Diego Dedura; 6–2, 7–5	(Morocco) Reda Bennani	(Bulgaria) Adrian Andreev (France) Sean Cuenin	(Italy) Iannis Miletich; Denis Klok (Morocco) Karim Bennani (Morocco) Younes Lalami
December 22	Agadir, Morocco; Clay; M15; Singles and doubles draws	(Morocco) Karim Bennani (Morocco) Younes Lalami; 7–6^{(7–1)}, 6–2	(Italy) Nicolo Toffanin (Italy) Federico Valle	(Bulgaria) Adrian Andreev (France) Sean Cuenin	(Italy) Iannis Miletich; Denis Klok (Morocco) Karim Bennani (Morocco) Younes Lalami
December 29	Monastir, Tunisia; Hard; M15; Singles and doubles draws	(Germany) Yannik Kelm; 6–1, 6–2	(Italy) Stefano D'Agostino	(Italy) Tobia Baragiola Mordini (France) Remy Dugardin	(Spain) Bernardo Munk Mesa (Greece) Dimitris Sakellaridis; Timofei Derepasko (Turkey) Ergi Kırkın
December 29	Monastir, Tunisia; Hard; M15; Singles and doubles draws	(France) Victor Paganetti (Romania) Matei Todoran; 6–2, 6–1	(Turkey) Melih Anavatan (Turkey) Kerem Yılmaz	(Italy) Tobia Baragiola Mordini (France) Remy Dugardin	(Spain) Bernardo Munk Mesa (Greece) Dimitris Sakellaridis; Timofei Derepasko (Turkey) Ergi Kırkın
December 29	Marrakesh, Morocco; Clay; M25; Singles and doubles draws	(France) Sean Cuenin; 6–1, 2–6, 7–6^{(7–1)}	(Germany) Diego Dedura	(Romania) Filip Cristian Jianu (Morocco) Reda Bennani	(Italy) Nicolo Toffanin (Bulgaria) Adrian Andreev; Andrey Chepelev (Spain) Alejo Sánchez Quílez
December 29	Marrakesh, Morocco; Clay; M25; Singles and doubles draws	(Italy) Noah Perfetti (Italy) Leonardo Primucci; 6–4, 6–4	(Spain) Alejo Sánchez Quílez (Italy) Federico Valle	(Romania) Filip Cristian Jianu (Morocco) Reda Bennani	(Italy) Nicolo Toffanin (Bulgaria) Adrian Andreev; Andrey Chepelev (Spain) Alejo Sánchez Quílez
