= 2026 Grand Prix Hassan II =

- Date: 30 March – 5 April
- Edition: 40th
- Category: 250 series
- Draw: 28S / 16D
- Surface: Clay / outdoor
- Location: Marrakesh, Morocco
- Venue: Royal Tennis Club de Marrakech

Champions

Singles
- (Spain) Rafael Jódar

Doubles
- (United States) Robert Cash / (United States) JJ Tracy
- Grand Prix Hassan II

The 2026 Grand Prix Hassan II was a professional men's tennis tournament played in Marrakesh, Morocco on clay courts. It was the 40th edition of the tournament and an ATP Tour 250 event on the 2026 ATP Tour. It took place from 30 March until 5 April 2026.

== Champions ==
=== Singles ===
- (Spain) Rafael Jódar def. (Argentina) Marco Trungelliti, 6–3, 6–2

=== Doubles ===
- (United States) Robert Cash / (United States) JJ Tracy def. (United States) Vasil Kirkov / (Netherlands) Bart Stevens, 6–2, 6–3

== Singles main draw entrants ==
=== Seeds ===
Country	Player	Rank^{†}	Seed
ITA	Luciano Darderi	18	1
NED	Tallon Griekspoor	29	2
FRA	Corentin Moutet	33	3
CZE	Tomáš Macháč	48	4
POL	Kamil Majchrzak	57	5
CZE	Vít Kopřiva	60	6
PER	Ignacio Buse	63	7
GER	Yannick Hanfmann	64	8

^{†} Rankings are as of 16 March 2026

=== Other entrants ===
The following players received wildcards into the singles main draw:

- (Morocco) Taha Baadi
- (Morocco) Karim Bennani
- (Morocco) Reda Bennani

The following player received entry through the Next Gen Accelerator program:

- (Italy) Federico Cinà

The following players received entry from the qualifying draw:

- (Serbia) Dušan Lajović
- (Portugal) Henrique Rocha
- (Kazakhstan) Timofey Skatov
- (Argentina) Marco Trungelliti

=== Withdrawals ===
- (France) Térence Atmane → replaced by (Australia) Aleksandar Vukic
- (France) Arthur Cazaux → replaced by (France) Hugo Gaston
- (Spain) Jaume Munar → replaced by (Netherlands) Jesper de Jong
- (China) Shang Juncheng → replaced by (Serbia) Hamad Medjedovic
- (Italy) Lorenzo Sonego → replaced by (Italy) Mattia Bellucci
- (Monaco) Valentin Vacherot → replaced by (France) Alexandre Müller

== Doubles main draw entrants ==
=== Seeds ===
Country	Player	Country	Player	Rank^{1}	Seed
MON	Hugo Nys	FRA	Édouard Roger-Vasselin	39	1
GBR	Luke Johnson	POL	Jan Zieliński	55	2
FRA	Théo Arribagé	FRA	Albano Olivetti	67	3
USA	Robert Cash	USA	JJ Tracy	80	4

- Rankings are as of 16 March 2026

=== Other entrants ===
The following pairs received wildcards into the doubles main draw:

- (Morocco) Taha Baadi / (Morocco) Karim Bennani
- (Morocco) Younes Lalami / (Poland) Filip Pieczonka
