= Reda Bennani =

Moroccan tennis player (born 2007)

- Country (sports): Morocco
- Born: 16 February 2007 (age 19) Casablanca, Morocco
- Height: 1.78 m (5 ft 10 in)
- Plays: Right-handed (two-handed backhand)
- Coach: Khalid Lhamidi
- Prize money: US $62,400

Singles
- Career record: 1–2 (at ATP Tour level, Grand Slam level, and in Davis Cup)
- Career titles: 0
- Highest ranking: No. 463 (3 August 2026)
- Current ranking: No. 463 (3 August 2026)

Doubles
- Career record: 0–1 (at ATP Tour level, Grand Slam level, and in Davis Cup)
- Career titles: 0
- Highest ranking: No. 1,664 (15 July 2024)
- Last updated on: 3 August 2026.

Reda Bennani (born 16 February 2007) is a Moroccan tennis player. He has a career-high ATP singles ranking of No. 463 achieved on 3 August 2026 and a doubles ranking of No. 1,664 reached on 15 July 2024.

Bennani represents Morocco at the Davis Cup, where he has a win-loss record of 1–1.

== Junior career ==
In February 2024, he won the prestigious J300 Maadi Cup in Cairo, Egypt, defeating top-seed Maxim Mrva in the final.

Later that season, Bennani became the first Moroccan to win a junior match at Wimbledon. He lost in the second round to Rafael Jódar.

Bennani had good results on the ITF junior circuit, maintaining a 110–42 singles win-loss record and reached an ITF junior combined ranking of No. 11 achieved on 6 January 2025.

== Professional career ==
=== 2023: Near ATP Tour debut ===
In April 2023, Bennani entered as a wildcard in the qualifiers of the Grand Prix Hassan II in Marrakesh. He won the first qualifying round against Vít Kopřiva but lost out on a chance to compete in the main draw after losing to Andrea Vavassori in the final round.

His next tournament was at the Madrid Open, where he entered in the qualifying draw as a wildcard but lost in the first round against Arthur Fils.

=== 2024: Entry in a second ATP 1000 qualifying draw ===
The following season, Bennani received another qualifying draw wildcard to the Masters in Madrid. The Moroccan lost in the first round against Brandon Nakashima, 1–6, 7^{7}–6^{5}, 1–6.

=== 2025: First pro final, ITF Tour titles ===
In July 2025, Bennani reached his maiden ITF Men's Tour final, which was also on home soil at M15 Tangier. He earned his first professional title defeating compatriot Yassine Dlimi in straight sets. Three months later, he won his maiden overseas ITF title at M15 Orlando, United States, with a victory against Christopher Li in the final.

In December, he reached the finals of another home soil ITF tournament, M15 Agadir, but lost to Diego Dedura-Palomero.

=== 2026: ATP main draw debut ===
In February 2026, Bennani entered as a wildcard in the qualifying draw of the Qatar Open, but lost to Pablo Carreño Busta in the first round. Together with Carreño Busta, they competed in the main doubles event – also through an invitation. The pair lost in the first round to qualifiers Quentin Halys and Pierre-Hugues Herbert.

In March, Bennani received a men's singles main draw wildcard to his home tournament. He lost to Mattia Bellucci in the first round.

== Personal life ==
Bennani is not related to Moroccan compatriot and professional tennis player Karim Bennani.

== ITF World Tennis Tour finals ==
=== Singles: 3 (2 titles, 1 runner-up) ===
Legend ITF WTT (2–1)

Result	W–L	Date	Tournament	Tier	Surface	Opponent	Score
Win	1–0	Jun 2025	M15 Tangier, Morocco	WTT	Clay	(Morocco) Yassine Dlimi	7–6^{(7–4)}, 6–4
Win	2–0	Nov 2025	M15 Orlando, US	WTT	Clay	(Peru) Christopher Li	6–7^{(1–7)}, 6–4, 6–4
Loss	2–1	Dec 2025	M15 Agadir, Morocco	WTT	Clay	(Germany) Diego Dedura	2–6, 5–7

=== Doubles: 1 (runner-up) ===
Legend
ITF WTT (0–1)

Result	W–L	Date	Tournament	Tier	Surface	Partner	Opponents	Score
Loss	0–1	Jun 2024	M15 Tangier, Morocco	WTT	Clay	(Italy) Federico Bondioli	(Morocco) Walid Ahouda (Morocco) Hamza El Amine	3–6, 5–7
