= Karim Bennani (tennis) =

Moroccan tennis player (born 2007)

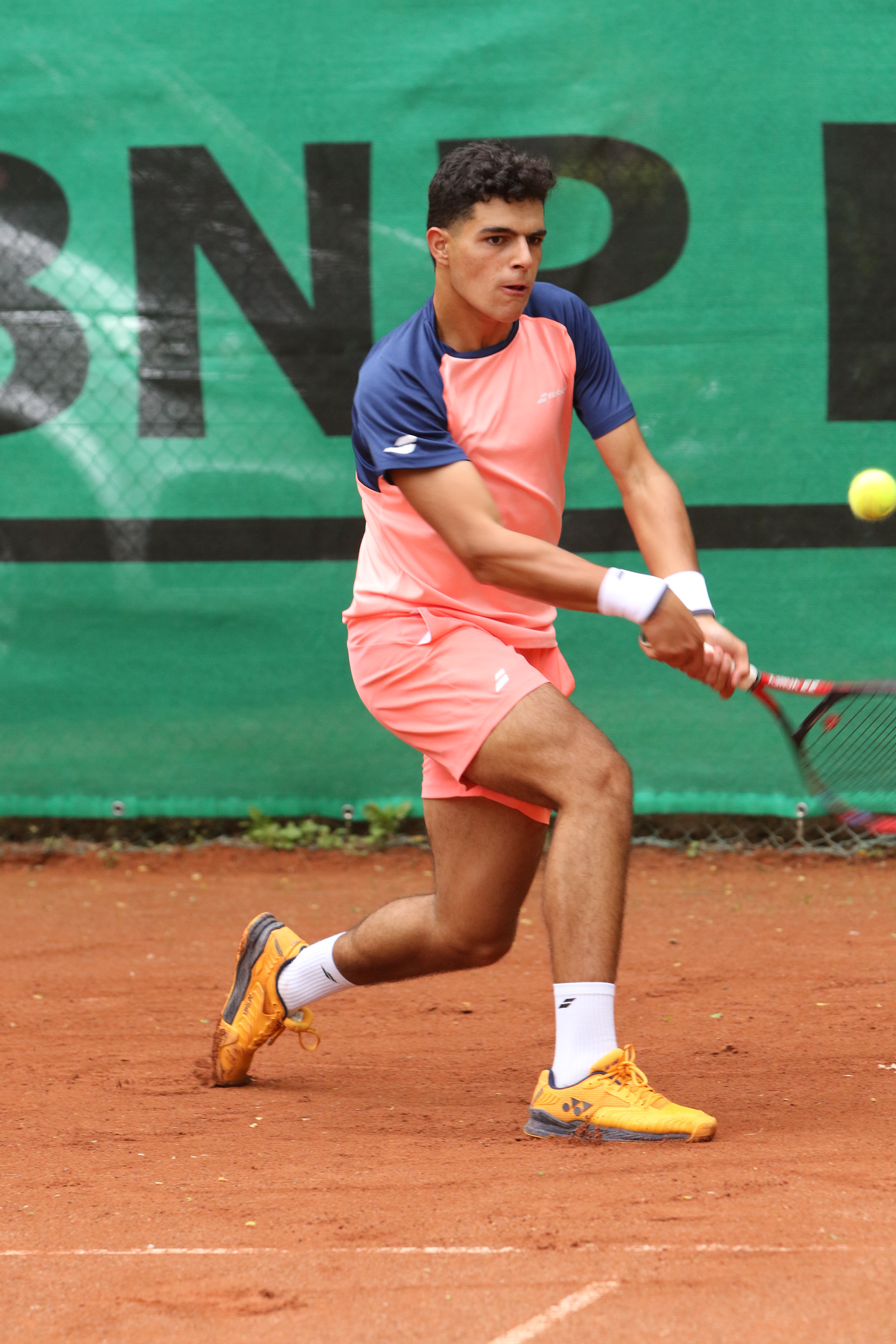
- Astrid Bowl, 27 May 2024
- Country (sports): Morocco
- Born: 3 September 2007 (age 19) Bordeaux, France
- Height: 1.83 m (6 ft 0 in)
- Plays: Right-handed (two-handed backhand)
- Prize money: US $46,011

Singles
- Career record: 3–1 (at ATP Tour level, Grand Slam level, and in Davis Cup)
- Career titles: 0
- Highest ranking: No. 421 (14 September 2026)
- Current ranking: No. 421 (14 September 2026)

Doubles
- Career record: 0–3 (at ATP Tour level, Grand Slam level, and in Davis Cup)
- Career titles: 0
- Highest ranking: No. 854 (24 August 2026)
- Current ranking: No. 883 (14 September 2026)
- Last updated on: 14 September 2026.

Karim Bennani
Medal record

Men's tennis

Representing Morocco

Mediterranean Games
| Gold medal – first place | 2026 Taranto | Singles |

Karim Bennani (born 3 September 2007) is a Moroccan tennis player. He has a career-high ATP singles ranking of No. 421 achieved on 14 September 2026 and a doubles ranking of No. 854 achieved on 24 August 2026.

He represents Morocco at the Davis Cup, where he has a win-loss record of 2–1.

== Junior tennis ==
In March 2025, he was a runner-up at the J300 Memorial Eduardo Ferrero in Villena, Spain, losing to third seed Alexander Vasilev in the final. The Moroccan won the boys' doubles event with Maxwell Exsted, defeating third seeds Jamie Mackenzie and Niels McDonald.

The following month, Bennani reached the boys' doubles final at the J300 Tournoi de Tennis ITF Junior in Beaulieu-sur-Mer, France, playing alongside Alejandro Arcila. The pair lost to Thijs Boogaard and Ivan Ivanov in straight sets.

Bennani had good results on the ITF junior circuit, maintaining a 106–62 singles win-loss record and reached an ITF junior combined ranking of No. 39 on 27 January 2025.

== Career ==
In 2024, Bennani made his ATP Tour debut after receiving wildcards for the doubles main draws at the Grand Prix Hassan II in Marrakesh. He teamed up with compatriot Hamza Karmoussi, but lost to Guido Andreozzi and Miguel Ángel Reyes-Varela in the first round.

In October 2025, Bennani won his first professional title, at the M15 Monastir, Tunisia. With this feat, he became the youngest Moroccan male tennis player to win an ITF Tour trophy since Karim Alami in 1991.

=== 2026: First ATP Tour win, top 600 ===
In March, Bennani received again main draw wildcards to his home tournament. He recorded his first ATP Tour win, defeating world No. 90 Quentin Halys in three sets. With this feat, he became the second Moroccan player – after Taha Baadi's victory on the same day – to win an ATP Tour match since Lamine Ouahab at the 2018 Grand Prix Hassan II. He also became the youngest Moroccan man to win an ATP Tour match. He lost to eight seed Yannick Hanfmann in the second round. Bennani also played in the doubles event – with Taha Baadi. The pair lost in the first round to third seeds Théo Arribagé and Albano Olivetti.

== Personal life ==
Bennani is not related to compatriot and professional tennis player Reda Bennani.

== ITF World Tennis Tour finals ==
=== Singles: 2 (1 title, 1 runner-up) ===
| Legend ITF WTT (1–1) |

| Result | W–L | Date | Tournament | Tier | Surface | Opponent | Score |
|---|---|---|---|---|---|---|---|
| Win | 1–0 | Oct 2025 | M15 Monastir, Tunisia | WTT | Hard | (Senegal) Seydina André | 6–0, 3–6, 6–2 |
| Loss | 1–1 | Dec 2025 | M15 Monastir, Tunisia | WTT | Hard | (France) Thomas Faurel | 6–3, 5–7, 5–7 |

=== Doubles: 2 (2 titles) ===
Legend
ITF WTT (2–0)

| Result | W–L | Date | Tournament | Tier | Surface | Partner | Opponents | Score |
|---|---|---|---|---|---|---|---|---|
| Win | 1–0 | Dec 2025 | M15 Monastir, Tunisia | WTT | Hard | (Tunisia) Alaa Trifi | (Italy) Andrea Colombo (Italy) Fausto Tabacco | 6–4, 6–4 |
| Win | 2–0 | Dec 2025 | M15 Agadir, Morocco | WTT | Clay | (Morocco) Younes Lalami | (Italy) Nicolo Toffanin (Italy) Federico Valle | 7–6^{(7–1)}, 6–2 |
