= Taha Baadi =

Moroccan tennis player (born 2001)

- Country (sports): Morocco; Canada
- Born: 19 July 2001 (age 25) Rabat, Morocco
- Height: 1.83 m (6 ft 0 in)
- Plays: Right-handed (two-handed backhand)
- College: Wake Forest; Kentucky
- Prize money: US $91,248

Singles
- Career record: 4–3
- Career titles: 1 ITF
- Highest ranking: No. 485 (13 April 2026)
- Current ranking: No. 485 (13 April 2026)

Doubles
- Career record: 0–2
- Career titles: 2 ITF
- Highest ranking: No. 478 (25 August 2025)
- Current ranking: No. 684 (13 April 2026)
- Last updated on: 13 April 2026.

Taha Baadi (born 19 July 2001) is a Moroccan tennis player who previously represented Canada in international competitions. He has a career-high ATP singles ranking of No. 485 achieved on 13 April 2026 and a doubles ranking of No. 478 reached on 25 August 2025. He is the current No. 4 Moroccan player in men's singles.

Baadi plays mostly on the ITF Men's Tour. He represents Morocco at the Davis Cup.

== Junior career ==
In February 2016, he won the prestigious U-16 event "Copa Galileo", Guatemala, in the boys' doubles – with Alex-Antoine Marquis. The pair defeated third seeds William Grant and Govind Nanda in the final.

Representing Canada, Baadi had good results on the ITF junior circuit, with a 104–59 singles win-loss record and reached an ITF junior combined ranking of No. 31 on 26 August 2019.

== College ==
Baadi attended the Wake Forest University in 2021, before transferring to University of Kentucky the following season.

== Professional career ==
In March 2025, Baadi made his ATP Tour debut after receiving main draw wildcards at the Grand Prix Hassan II in Marrakesh. In the singles draw, he lost to fifth seed Roberto Carballés Baena in the first round. Baadi partnered with compatriot Younes Lalami for the doubles event. The pair was defeated by Mattia Bellucci and Hugo Gaston.

=== 2026: First ATP Tour win, top 500 ===
In March, Baadi received again main draw wildcards to his home tournament. He recorded his first Main Tour win, defeating world No. 84 Aleksandar Vukic in three sets. With this feat, he became the first Moroccan player to win an ATP Tour match since Lamine Ouahab at the 2018 Grand Prix Hassan II. He lost to third seed Corentin Moutet in the second round. Baadi also played in the doubles event – with compatriot Karim Bennani. The pair lost in the first round to third seeds Théo Arribagé and Albano Olivetti.
