= Swimming at the 2025 Summer World University Games – Women's 400 metre freestyle =

Women's 400 metre freestyle at the 2025 Summer World University Games
- Venue: Schwimm- und Sprunghalle im Europasportpark
- Location: Berlin
- Dates: 23 July (heats and final)
- Competitors: 39 from 28 nations

Medalists
| gold medal | Francisca Martins | Portugal |
| silver medal | Cavan Gormsen | United States |
| bronze medal | Michaela Mattes | United States |

The women's 400 metre freestyle at the 2025 Summer World University Games in Rhine-Ruhr, Germany was held 23 July 2025. Francisca Martins from Portugal won the gold medal, Cavan Gormsen from the United States took the silver medal and Michaela Mattes from the United States earned the bronze medal.

== Schedule ==
All times are Central European Time (UTC+1)

| Date | Time | Round |
|---|---|---|
| 23 July | 09:00 | Heats |
| 23 July | 19:56 | Final |

== Records ==
Prior to the competition, the world and Universiade records were as follows.

| Category | Swimmer | Record | Date | Place | Event |
|---|---|---|---|---|---|
| World record | (Canada) Summer McIntosh | 3:54.18 | 7 June 2025 | Victoria, Canada | 2025 Canadian Trials |
| Universiade record | (Germany) Sarah Köhler | 4:03.96 | 26 August 2017 | Taipei, Chinese Taipei | 2017 Summer Universiade |

== Results ==
=== Heats ===
All entered athletes competed across multiple seeded heats in the morning session. Swimmers with the top 8 fastest times advanced, regardless of which individual heat they swam.

| Rank | Heat | Lane | Swimmer | Nation | Time | Notes |
|---|---|---|---|---|---|---|
| 1 | 4 | 4 | Cavan Gormsen | United States | 4:12.30 | Q |
| 2 | 4 | 3 | Michaela Mattes | United States | 4:12.39 | Q |
| 3 | 5 | 4 | Julie Brousseau | Canada | 4:12.42 | Q |
| 4 | 4 | 1 | Kanon Nagao | Japan | 4:12.59 | Q |
| 5 | 5 | 3 | Ruka Takezawa | Japan | 4:12.77 | Q |
| 6 | 4 | 5 | Francisca Martins | Portugal | 4:12.83 | Q |
| 7 | 4 | 6 | Noemi Cesarano | Italy | 4:13.26 | Q |
| 8 | 4 | 7 | Noemi Lamberti | Italy | 4:14.98 | Q |
| 9 | 4 | 8 | Rebecca Diaconescu | Romania | 4:15.20 | |
| 10 | 5 | 6 | Sarah Dumont | Belgium | 4:16.04 | |
| 11 | 3 | 2 | Hannah Robertson | South Africa | 4:16.71 | |
| 12 | 5 | 8 | Hannah Allen | Australia | 4:16.89 | |
| 13 | 3 | 1 | Han Da-kyung | South Korea | 4:18.03 | |
| 14 | 3 | 8 | Anna Fomina | Portugal | 4:19.18 | |
| 15 | 3 | 4 | Alba Herrero | Spain | 4:19.22 | |
| 16 | 5 | 1 | Lucile Tessariol | France | 4:19.23 | |
| 17 | 2 | 5 | Nóra Flück | Hungary | 4:19.25 | |
| 18 | 3 | 6 | Fleur Lewis | Great Britain | 4:19.32 | |
| 19 | 5 | 5 | Ai Yanhan | China | 4:19.76 | |
| 20 | 3 | 3 | Nicole Maier | Germany | 4:19.84 | |
| 21 | 5 | 7 | Marian Plöger | Germany | 4:20.36 | |
| 22 | 5 | 2 | Julia Strojnowska | Canada | 4:20.85 | |
| 23 | 4 | 2 | Klaudia Tarasiewicz | Poland | 4:21.59 | |
| 24 | 2 | 4 | Lise Coetzee | South Africa | 4:21.85 | |
| 25 | 3 | 5 | Ainhoa Campabadal | Spain | 4:22.47 | |
| 26 | 2 | 7 | Julia Balthasar | Switzerland | 4:23.46 | |
| 27 | 2 | 2 | Laura Benková | Slovakia | 4:24.29 | |
| 28 | 1 | 3 | Bhavya Sachdeva | India | 4:28.27 | |
| 29 | 3 | 7 | Johanna Enkner | Austria | 4:28.37 | |
| 30 | 1 | 4 | Josefina Allport | Argentina | 4:31.11 | |
| 31 | 1 | 8 | Belen Lahoz | Argentina | 4:35.83 | |
| 32 | 2 | 8 | Kimberly Uyaguari | Ecuador | 4:37.59 | |
| 33 | 1 | 1 | Fatima Alkaramova | Azerbaijan | 4:39.31 | |
| 34 | 2 | 1 | Anastasiya Zelinskaya | Uzbekistan | 4:40.04 | |
| 35 | 1 | 2 | Ashmitha Chandra | India | 4:40.27 | |
| 36 | 1 | 6 | María Hincapié | Colombia | 4:50.18 | |
| 37 | 1 | 7 | Paula Guevara | Ecuador | 4:54.53 | |
| — | 1 | 5 | Paige van der Westhuizen | Zimbabwe | DNS | |
| — | 2 | 3 | Deniz Ertan | Turkey | DNS | |

=== Final ===
The fastest 8 swimmers competed in a single race to determine the gold, silver and bronze medalists.

| Rank | Lane | Swimmer | Nation | Time | Notes |
|---|---|---|---|---|---|
| 1st place, gold medalist(s) | 7 | Francisca Martins | Portugal | 4:07.50 | |
| 2nd place, silver medalist(s) | 4 | Cavan Gormsen | United States | 4:07.64 | |
| 3rd place, bronze medalist(s) | 5 | Michaela Mattes | United States | 4:09.88 | |
| 4 | 3 | Julie Brousseau | Canada | 4:10.14 | |
| 5 | 6 | Kanon Nagao | Japan | 4:10.36 | |
| 6 | 1 | Noemi Cesarano | Italy | 4:11.90 | |
| 7 | 2 | Ruka Takezawa | Japan | 4:13.67 | |
| 8 | 8 | Noemi Lamberti | Italy | 4:14.53 | |
