= Swimming at the 2025 Summer World University Games – Women's 800 metre freestyle =

Women's 800 metre freestyle at the 2025 Summer World University Games
- Venue: Schwimm- und Sprunghalle im Europasportpark
- Location: Berlin
- Dates: 18 July (heats); 19 July (final)
- Competitors: 18 from 15 nations

Medalists
gold medal	Mila Nikanorov	United States
silver medal	Francisca Martins	Portugal
bronze medal	Ruka Takezawa	Japan

The women's 800 metre freestyle at the 2025 Summer World University Games in Rhine-Ruhr, Germany was held from 18 to 19 July 2025. Mila Nikanorov from the United States won the gold medal, Francisca Martins from Portugal took the silver medal and Ruka Takezawa from Japan earned the bronze medal.

== Schedule ==
All times are Central European Time (UTC+1)

Date	Time	Round
18 July	11:24	Heats
19 July	20:22	Final

== Records ==
Prior to the competition, the world and Universiade records were as follows.

Category	Swimmer	Record	Date	Place	Event
World record	(United States) Katie Ledecky	8:04.12	3 May 2025	Fort Lauderdale, United States	TYR Swim Pro Series
Universiade record	(Italy) Simona Quadarella	8:20.54	26 August 2017	Taipei, Chinese Taipei	2017 Summer Universiade

== Results ==
=== Heats ===
All entered athletes competed across multiple seeded heats in the morning session. Swimmers with the top 8 fastest times advanced, regardless of which individual heat they swam.

Rank	Heat	Lane	Swimmer	Nation	Time	Notes
1	2	4	Mila Nikanorov	United States	8:36.12	Q
2	2	2	Julie Brousseau	Canada	8:37.23	Q
3	3	6	Niko Aoki	Japan	8:37.52	Q
4	2	5	Noemi Cesarano	Italy	8:37.83	Q
5	3	5	Ruka Takezawa	Japan	8:37.90	Q
6	3	1	Rebecca Diaconescu	Romania	8:38.01	Q
7	2	3	Francisca Martins	Portugal	8:38.13	Q
8	3	4	Kate Hurst	United States	8:38.15	Q
9	3	7	Han Da-kyung	South Korea	8:41.62	
10	3	3	Marian Plöger	Germany	8:41.71	
11	2	7	Fleur Lewis	Great Britain	8:46.55	
12	1	4	Hannah Allen	Australia	8:46.79	
13	3	2	Sarah Dumont	Belgium	8:49.30	
14	3	8	Nóra Flück	Hungary	8:49.35	
15	2	1	Stephanie Houtman	South Africa	8:51.63	
16	2	6	Julia Strojnowska	Canada	8:56.59	
17	1	3	Amélie Bertschi	Switzerland	9:00.29	
18	1	5	Ada Hakkarainen	Finland	9:12.45	

=== Final ===
The fastest 8 swimmers competed in a single race to determine the gold, silver and bronze medalists.

Rank	Lane	Swimmer	Nation	Time	Notes
1st place, gold medalist(s)	4	Mila Nikanorov	United States	8:27.61	
2nd place, silver medalist(s)	1	Francisca Martins	Portugal	8:30.76	
3rd place, bronze medalist(s)	2	Ruka Takezawa	Japan	8:30.95	
4	8	Kate Hurst	United States	8:32.67	
5	7	Rebecca Diaconescu	Romania	8:36.51	
6	3	Niko Aoki	Japan	8:36.87	
7	6	Noemi Cesarano	Italy	8:38.40	
8	5	Julie Brousseau	Canada	8:39.36	
