= Cesarano =

Cesarano is a surname. Notable people with the surname include:

- Antonietta Cesarano (born 2003), Italian swimmer
- Federico Cesarano (1886–1969), Italian fencer
- Noemi Cesarano (born 2003), Italian swimmer
- Ferdinando Cesarano (born 1954), founder and former head of the Camorra's Cesarano clan
