= Swimming at the 2026 Mediterranean Games – Women's 400 metre freestyle =

Women's 400 metre freestyle at the 2026 Mediterranean Games
- Location: Taranto, Italy
- Dates: 22 August
- Competitors: 12 from 9 nations
- Winning time: 4:09.00

Medalists
gold medal	Francisca Martins	Portugal
silver medal	Bianca Nannucci	Italy
bronze medal	Antonietta Cesarano	Italy

The Women's 400 metre freestyle competition at the 2026 Mediterranean Games was held on 22 August 2026 at the Torre d'Ayala Swimming Stadiumin Taranto.

== Records ==
Prior to this competition, the existing world and Mediterranean Games records were as follows:

World record	Summer McIntosh (CAN)	3:54.18	Victoria, Canada	7 June 2025
Mediterranean Games record	Federica Pellegrini (ITA)	4:00.41	Pescara, Italy	27 June 2009

== Results ==
=== Heats ===
Rank	Heat	Lane	Name	Nationality	Time	Notes
1	2	4	Francisca Martins	Portugal	4:17.14	q
2	2	5	Antonietta Cesarano	Italy	4:17.70	q
3	1	4	Bianca Nannucci	Italy	4:18.06	q
4	2	6	Ecem Dönmez	Turkey	4:19.57	q
5	2	3	Carla Carrón	Spain	4:19.62	q
6	2	2	Iman Avdić	Bosnia and Herzegovina	4:20.50	q
7	1	6	Selinnur Sade	Turkey	4:23.37	q
8	1	2	Inês Jacinto Henriques	Portugal	4:24.13	q
9	1	7	Margherita Gregoroni	San Marino	4:27.57	
10	2	7	Sara Jankovikj	North Macedonia	4:34.83	
	1	3	Jamila Boulakbech	Tunisia	Did not start	
	1	5	Artemis Vasilaki	Greece	Did not start	

=== Final ===
Rank	Lane	Name	Nationality	Time	Notes
1st place, gold medalist(s)	4	Francisca Martins	Portugal	4:09.00	
2nd place, silver medalist(s)	3	Bianca Nannucci	Italy	4:11.61	
3rd place, bronze medalist(s)	5	Antonietta Cesarano	Italy	4:13.17	
4	2	Carla Carrón	Spain	4:15.43	
5	6	Ecem Dönmez	Turkey	4:17.38	
6	7	Iman Avdić	Bosnia and Herzegovina	4:21.57	
7	8	Inês Jacinto Henriques	Portugal	4:24.07	
8	1	Selinnur Sade	Turkey	4:24.64	
