= List of 2022 Canada Summer Games medallists =

The following is the list of medallists from the 2022 Canada Summer Games held in the Niagara Region, Ontario.

== Athletics ==
=== Male ===
| Event | Gold | | Silver | | Bronze | |
|---|---|---|---|---|---|---|
| 100m | Eliezer Adjibi; Ontario | 10.32 | Ramone English; Alberta | 10.39 | Malachi Murray; Alberta | 10.41 |
| 100m Special Olympics | Gabriel Dupuy; Quebec | 11.30 | Bradyn Giraudier; Saskatchewan | 11.80 | Jesse Thibeault; British Columbia | 11.91 |
| 100m Wheelchair | Clison Djanebaye; Quebec | 17.30 | Tai Young; Ontario | 17.71 | Leo Sammarelli; British Columbia | 18.73 |
| 110m Hurdles | Craig Thorne; New Brunswick | 13.83 | David Adeleye; Ontario | 14.03 | Antoine Lebrun; Quebec | 14.17 |
| 200m | Mike Roth; Ontario | 21.20 | Malachi Murray; Alberta | 21.65 | Shen Arnett; Alberta | 21.73 |
| 200m Special Olympics | Gabriel Dupuy; Quebec | 23.33 | Bradyn Giraudier; Saskatchewan | 24.18 | Jesse Thibeault; British Columbia | 24.32 |
| 400m | Mike Roth; Ontario | 47.37 | Olivier Desmeules; Quebec | 48.00 | Chetaan Judge; Alberta | 48.49 |
| 400m Hurdles | Justin Rose; Alberta | 51.18 | David Moulongou; Ontario | 52.79 | Kai Spierenburg; Alberta | 52.92 |
| 400m Wheelchair | Clison Djanebaye; Quebec | 1:04.03 | Leo Sammarelli; British Columbia | 1:06.73 | Tai Young; Ontario | 1:07.65 |
| 800m | Eric Lutz; Alberta | 1:49.33 | Laurent-Olivier Dumont; Quebec | 1:49.74 | Zakary Mama-Yari; Quebec | 1:50.60 |
| 1500m | Eric Lutz; Alberta | 3:52.35 | Andrew Peverill; Nova Scotia | 3:53.85 | Matthew Beaudet; Alberta | 3:55.21 |
| 1500m Wheelchair | Leo Sammarelli; British Columbia | 4:29.39 | Tai Young; Ontario | 4:35.13 | Kyrell Sopotyk; Saskatchewan | 4:40.20 |
| 3000m Steeplechase | Cole Dinsdale; British Columbia | 9:06.68 | Isaac Cull; New Brunswick | 9:08.64 | Jonathan Adam Podbielski; Saskatchewan | 9:11.85 |
| 5000m | Andrew Peverill; Nova Scotia | 14:20.15 | Mitchell Joseph Ubene; Ontario | 14:23.48 | Matthew Beaudet; Quebec | 14:24.24 |
| 4 × 100 m | Ontario; David Adeleye; Eliezer Adjibi; Alex Collins; Immanuel Onyemah | 40.52 | British Columbia; Kenny Blackman Jr. Calib Gruninger; Jesaiah Penson-McCoy; Aidan Turner | 40.86 | Manitoba; Tyrell Davis; Brian Lewis; Seb Regnier; Jordan Soufi | 41.11 |
| 4 × 400 m | Quebec; Cedrik Flipo; Micaël Anku; Zakary Mama-Yari; Olivier Desmeules | 3:10.50 | Alberta; Caiden Schultz; Justin Rose; Eric Lutz; Kai Spierenburg | 3:11.79 | Ontario; Luca Nicoletti; David Moulongou; Michael Petersen; Michael Roth | 3:11.90 |
| Decathlon | Édouard Lavoie Beaulieu; Quebec | 6,725 pts | Ryan Evans; New Brunswick | 6,690 pts | Jared Hendricks-Polack; Ontario | 6,388 pts |
| Discus | Dennis Ohene-adu; Ontario | 48.48m | Samuel Boruque; New Brunswick | 48.34m | Tommy Nedow; Ontario | 48.14m |
| Discus Para | Andrew Livingtone; Alberta | 843 pts | Jesse Zesseu; Ontario | 825 pts | Teddy Hudye; Saskatchewan | 391 pts |
| Hammer | Andreas Troschke; Alberta | 58.51m | Sean Reimer; Alberta | 56.81m | Jarod Manuel; New Brunswick | 52.82m |
| High Jump | Noel Vanderzee; British Columbia | 2.12m | Thomas Becker; Ontario | 2.12m | Joey Macdonald; Nova Scotia | 2.09m |
| Javelin | Joshua Mather; Ontario | 69.72m | Erik Tyler; Ontario | 69.23m | Jarrett Chong; British Columbia | 62.97m |
| Long Jump | Johnathan Jacob; Ontario | 7.36m | Kenneth West; Ontario | 7.36m | Ryan Denman; British Columbia | 7.20m |
| Pole Vault | Brennan Seguin; Ontario | 5.00m | Maxime Leveille; Quebec | 4.70m | Isaac Clements; British Columbia | 4.50m |
| Shot Put | Dennis Ohene-adu; Ontario | 16.91m | Samuel Bourque; New Brunswick | 16.25m | Tommy Nedow; Ontario | 16.07m |
| Shot Put Para | Jesse Zesseu; Ontario | 569 pts | Teddy Hudye; Saskatchewan | 357 pts | Andrew Livingstone; Alberta | 114 pts |
| Triple Jump | Femi Akinduro; Ontario | 16.26m | Daxx Turner; Manitoba | 15.47m | Robbie Gerstner; Manitoba | 14.92m |

=== Female ===
| Event | Gold | | Silver | | Bronze | |
|---|---|---|---|---|---|---|
| 100m | Audrey Leduc; Quebec | 11.55 | Katherine Lucas; British Columbia | 11.84 | Amy Candrlic; Alberta | 11.88 |
| 100m Hurdles | Tyra Boug; Ontario | 13.64 | Aliyah Logan; Ontario | 13.79 | Sienna MacDonald; Alberta | 13.84 |
| 100m Special Olympics | Joy MacLachlan; Nova Scotia | 14.02 | Regan Hofley; Manitoba | 14.34 | Vesta Orchard; Manitoba | 14.80 |
| 100m Wheelchair | Rosie Long; Ontario | 20.83 | Britney Volkman; Alberta | 20.95 | Avya Delainey; Saskatchewan | 27.70 |
| 200m | Audrey Leduc; Quebec | 23.70 | Grace Konrad; Alberta | 23.85 | Audrey Jackson; Quebec | 23.94 |
| 200m Special Olympics | Regan Hofley; Manitoba | 29.60 | Joy MacLachlan; Nova Scotia | 29.61 | Vesta Orchard; Manitoba | 31.09 |
| 400m | Grace Konrad; Alberta | 53.28 | Audrey Jackson; Quebec | 53.98 | Sophie Ba; Quebec | 55.22 |
| 400m Hurdles | Savannah Sutherland; Saskatchewan | 59.80 | Tolu Akinduro; Ontario | 1:01.19 | Marie-Frédérique Poulin; Quebec | 1:01.68 |
| 400m Wheelchair | Britney Volkman; Alberta | 1:18.36 | Cori Hicks; Newfoundland and Labrador | 1:52.69 | Maggie Slessor; Alberta | 3:16.13 |
| 800m | Olivia Cooper; Alberta | 2:08.21 | Sadie-Jane Hickson; Ontario | 2:08.39 | Mikayla Tinkham; British Columbia | 2:09.43 |
| 1500m | Catherine Beauchemin; Quebec | 4:25.00 | Olivia Cooper; Alberta | 4:25.23 | Mikayla Tinkham; British Columbia | 4:25.39 |
| 1500m Wheelchair | Britney Volkman; Alberta | 5:27.88 | Rosie Long; Ontario | 5:55.26 | Not awarded | |
| 3000m Steeplechase | Catherine Beauchemin; Quebec | 10:09.69 | Maya Kobylanski; British Columbia | 10:21.01 | Jenna McFadyen; Saskatchewan | 10:30.55 |
| 5000m | Jasmine Fehr; Saskatchewan | 17:06.77 | Jenna McFadyen; Saskatchewan | 17:08.61 | Laurence Gauthier; Quebec | 17:28.84 |
| 4 × 100 m | Quebec; Sophie Ba; Marie-Éloïse Leclair; Jorden Savoury; Maria Ulysse | 44.74 | Alberta; Amy Candrlic; Grace Konrad; Julia Lovsin; Sienna MacDonald; Anok Tiordit | 46.32 | Saskatchewan; Hannah Hagerty; Selena Keyowski; Paige Willems; Kailee Woitas | 46.49 |
| 4 × 400 m | Quebec; Marie-Éloïse Leclair; Marie-Frédérique Poulin; Audrey Jackson; Sophie Ba | 3:41.96 | Alberta; Anok Tirodit; Olivia Cooper; Madeleine Browne; Grace Konrad | 3:41.98 | British Columbia; Cayla Smith; Emily Lindsay; Prabhasha Wickramaarachchi; Katherine Lucas | 3:43.11 |
| Discus | Trinity Tutti; Ontario | 54.26m | Grace Tennant; Ontario | 53.86m | Dolly Gabri; British Columbia | 44.52m |
| Discus Para | Christel Robichaud; New Brunswick | 682 pts | Jasmyn McCulloch; Alberta | 646 pts | Joanne Lee; Ontario | 243 pts |
| Hammer | Chanell Alexa Botsis; British Columbia | 61.44m | Tasha Willing; British Columbia | 57.12m | Osereme Omosun; Alberta | 54.37m |
| Heptathlon | Madi Lawrence; Manitoba | 5,655 pts | Hannah Blair; Ontario | 5,378 pts | Kira Kopec; Alberta | 5,245 pts |
| High Jump | Madison Mayr; Alberta | 1.77m | Madi Lawrence; Manitoba | 1.74m | Trinity Hansma; British Columbia | 1.74m |
| Javelin | Madison McLean; Ontario | 47.84m | Jenna Reid; Nova Scotia | 47.58m | Madelyn Quinn; Nova Scotia | 47.40m |
| Long Jump | Trinity Shadd-Ceres; Ontario | 6.40m | Madi Lawrence; Manitoba | 6.26m | Sienna MacDonald; Alberta | 6.18m |
| Pole Vault | Lynton Lam; Ontario | 3.70m | Sage Stoyka Kay; Ontario | 3.70m | Ella Foster; British Columbia | 3.50m |
| Shot Put | Grace Tennant; Ontario | 16.00m | Tasha Willing; British Columbia | 15.06m | Osereme Omosun; Alberta | 14.49m |
| Shot Put Para | Christel Robichaud; New Brunswick | 557 pts | Jasmyn McCulloch; Alberta | 516 pts | Laura Calovini; Ontario | 462 pts |
| Triple Jump | Jasmine Scott-Kilgo; Ontario | 12.74m | Peace Omonzane; Ontario | 12.56m | Lexie Shannon; New Brunswick | 12.43m |

== Baseball ==
| Event | Gold | Silver | Bronze |
|---|---|---|---|
| Men's | Ontario; Jorge Valdes; Carson Tehan; Veer Wadhwani; Nathan King; Owen Slater; Aiden Taggart; Calvin Warrillow; Brendan Lawson; Matt Marsh; Frankie Caietta; Owen McMulkin; Lucas Alberti; BJ Peart; Preston Barr; Jack Cohen; RJ James; Sam MacLaughlin; Brayden Ricketts; Mac Robertson; David Stanley | Alberta; Nathan Flewelling; Mitchell Heinrich; Michael Yusypchuk; Keegan Shepansky; Cade Harrison; Simon Baker; Kaio English; Dylan Chopp; Léo Côté; Jeff Bullock; Rowan Robinson; Gavin Galenza; Owen Pote; Jaxon Zanolli; Matthew Murray; Kaidan Baron; Eric Machej; Brett Getz; Eric Hartman; Lucas Webber-Kitching | Saskatchewan; Evan Deringer; Callum Hollinger; Austin Berner; Jackson Martin; Oakland Flodell; Joel Bauml; Sutter Balog; Cornelius Wouters; Carter Beck; Jack Erlandson; Colin David Plain; Adam Beamin; Jonah Kuntz; Merek Yeager; Nathan Houston; Boston Kohlman Bast; Takao Cookson; Cam Marshak; Adam Korte; Alex Ellert |

== Basketball ==
| Event | Gold | Silver | Bronze |
|---|---|---|---|
| Men's | Ontario; Yamari Allette; Mike Evbagharu; David Simon; Hunter Harding; Keenan Morain; Benni Kazadi; Jahari Williamson; Kobe Chris-Anthony Charles; Jacob Theodosiou; Davante Hackett; Jaiden Cole; Koat Thomas | British Columbia; Eli Djordjevic; Kiran Chadwick-Rupp; Gurshan Singh Sran; Adam Olsen; Tate Christiansen; Karan Aujla; Jimmy Zaborniak; Jaylen Lee; Aubrey Dorey-Havens; Reuben Wright; Dylan Gage; Temwa Mtawali | Nova Scotia; Aidan Clarke; Danny Daly; Braeden MacVicar; Michael Kenney; Jalen Janes; Isaac Matheson; Kyle Munro; Malik Mershati; Nate Johnson; Erik Hayden; Nate Slawter; Gabe Davignon |
| Women's | Alberta; Delaney Gibb; Kiah Easton-Ihediohanma; Grace Hansen; Milica Gajic; Piper Dobbelsteyn; Abby Graves; Leah Travers; Lauren Crocker; Maya Flindall; Liv Leung; Tana Layton; Reece Hall | Saskatchewan; Morgan Ostig; Alexis Lewans; Sarah Valley; Nada Mohamed Emara; Ajok Deng Madol; Logan Reider; Frances Aceron; Nevaeh Ferrara-Horne; Megan Weisgerber; Brynn Endicott; Mattea Teece | Ontario; Jessica Wangolo; Achol Akot; Corrynn Parker; Jacqueline Urban; Jada Bediako; Catrina Garvey; Taija Sta. Maria; Rheyna Steinauer; Sarah Hurley; Amy Hagman; Ella Rees; Keira Spencer |

== Box lacrosse ==
| Event | Gold | Silver | Bronze |
|---|---|---|---|
| Men's | British Columbia; Levi Touey; Cole Kennett; Jared Maznik; Kalen Murray; Graysen Baletti; Jordan Meech; Nolan Ross; Dylan Ilett; Jordan Reed; Dorian Connolley; Arjun Gill; Josh Mills; Angus Snow; JJ Milne; Aidan McDonald; Nathan Chalmers; Luca Pivetta; Reid Hinds Macdonald | Ontario; Markus Madill; Reece DiCicco; Kyler Francis; Lowen Martin; Kaden Kublinskas; Matt Hamill; Hayden Hiltz; Max Frattaroli; Ben McIsaac; Kelly Porter; Thomas Bagnall; Ethan Robertson; Tristan Caldwell; Owen Orpana; Jacob Keller; Hunter Lubiniecki; Julien Belair; Ty Jesso | Alberta; Tyden Redlick; Justin Melnyk; Jayce Dievert; Carson Mann; Jaxon Baker; Jonah Borynec; Russel Bollinger; Blake Harrison; Xander Maxwell; Caiden Moon; Alek Zorniak; Arley Wasson; Wyatt Viste; Alex Zarsky; Noah Everson; Dylan Whitmore; Reed Low; Tom Gallagher |
| Women's | Ontario; Kayla Kondo; Tristan Thompson; Regan Briese; Morgan White; Aisha Hoover; Elyse Nyarko; Megan Bell; Rylan Haslam; Lilly Bell; Jenna Smellie; Kate Foster; Jill Goldie; Danica Swistun; Kennedy Goddard; Dacia Cordingley; Georgia Ruscitti; Stella Burke; Tyler McDonald | British Columbia; Anikka Macdonald; Abi Janzen; Ashlyn Dhandwar; Alyssa Clark; Gillian Lapierre; Rory Rothnie; Beth Anderson; Elora Waardenburg; Olivia Ng; Grace Tidman; Mariah Whitfield; Macie Beck-Boreson; Alex Paterson; Iandra Lamplugh; Tessa Fawdry; Michela Paterson; Lexy Stevenson; Kiera Scott | Alberta; Ava Pinch; Paige Murphy; Layla Jaber; Jenna Snyder; Lexi MacLeod; Amelia Hawkes; Leah Rycroft; Asha Jamieson; Hannah Fofonoff; Syrianna Running Rabbit; Olivia Schmidt; Cam de Paiva; Kalli Hilchie; Jordyn Payne; Trinity Rose; Mia Yuris; Ceili Mae Jobb; Kate Halcro |

== Canoe Kayak ==
=== Canoe ===
| Event | Gold | | Silver | | Bronze | |
|---|---|---|---|---|---|---|
| Men's C-1 200m | Édouard Beaumier; Quebec | 41.666 | Ydris Hunter; Ontario | 42.418 | Eric Chouniard; Nova Scotia | 44.504 |
| Men's C-1 500m | Andrew Billard; Nova Scotia | 1:51.03 | Ydris Hunter; Ontario | 1:51.71 | Édouard Beaumier; Quebec | 1:55.39 |
| Men's C-1 1000m | Andrew Billard; Nova Scotia | 3:58.417 | Matt O'Neill; Ontario | 4:02.603 | Edgar Désy; Quebec | 4:03.936 |
| Men's C-1 5000m | Matt O'Neill; Ontario | 25:44.5 | Edgar Désy; Quebec | 26.46.0 | Eric Chouinard; Nova Scotia | 26:59.9 |
| Men's C-2 200m | Quebec; Édouard Beaumier; Frédéric Hallé | 43.145 | Ontario; Zach Kralik; Nick Shirokov | 43.699 | Nova Scotia; Alex MacNeil; Jai Paliwal | 45.067 |
| Men's C-2 500m | Quebec; Édouard Beaumier; Viktor Hardy | 1:42.460 | Ontario; Ydris Hunter; Matt O'Neill | 1:43.279 | Nova Scotia; Eric Chouinard; Alex MacNeil | 1:52.143 |
| Men's C-2 1000m | Quebec; Edgar Désy; Victor Hardy | 3:44.57 | Ontario; Peter Bradley; Matt O'Neill | 3:44.89 | Nova Scotia; Alex MacNeil; Jai Paliwal | 4:07.45 |
| Men's IC-4 200m | Quebec; Édouard Beaumier; Edgar Désy; Frédéric Hallé; Victor Hardy | 39.591 | Nova Scotia; Andrew Billard; Eric Chouinard; Alex MacNeil; Jai Paliwal | 41.582 | Ontario; Peter Bradley; Zach Kralik; Matt O'Neill; Nick Shirokov | 41.803 |
| Men's IC-4 500m | Quebec; Édouard Beaumier; Edgar Désy; Frédéric Hallé; Victor Hardy | 1:44.230 | Ontario; Peter Bradley; Zach Kralik; Matt O'Neill; Nick Shirokov | 1:47:270 | Nova Scotia; Andrew Billard; Eric Chouinard; Alex MacNeil; Jai Paliwal | 1:50.570 |
| Women's C-1 200m | Sloan MacKenzie; Nova Scotia | 51.070 | Evie Maria Eileen McDonald; Ontario | 52.562 | Elizabeth Desrosiers McArthur; Quebec | 53.513 |
| Women's C-1 500m | Julia Lilley Osende; Nova Scotia | 2:08.82 | Amelia Wojtyk; Ontario | 2:14.70 | Konwana'Ke:ren Diabo; Quebec | 2:14.77 |
| Women's C-1 1000m | Jacy Grant; Nova Scotia | 4:30.265 | Amelia Wojtyk; Ontario | 4:35.934 | Veronica So; Quebec | 4:46.540 |
| Women's C-1 5000m | Jacy Grant; Nova Scotia | 28:31.3 | Zoe Wojtyk; Ontario | 29:20.7 | Keisa Bleiler; British Columbia | 30:21.5 |
| Women's C-2 200m | Nova Scotia; Jacy Grant; Sloan MacKenzie | 47.736 | Quebec; Konwana'Ke:ren Diabo; Maïka Nadeau | 49.034 | British Columbia; Keisa Bleiler; Veronica So | 49.100 |
| Women's C-2 500m | Nova Scotia; Julia Lilley Osende; Jessica Mackay | 2:10.877 | British Columbia; Keisa Bleiler; Veronica So | 2:18.934 | Quebec; Elizabeth Desrosiers McArthur; Alexia Gagnon | 2:21.584 |
| Women's C-2 1000m | Nova Scotia; Ava Carew; Jessica Mackay | 4:18.27 | Ontario; Amelia Wojtyk; Zoe Wojtyk | 4:21.14 | Quebec; Elizabeth Desrosiers McArthur; Alexia Gagnon | 4:34.67 |
| Women's IC-4 200m | Quebec; Elizabeth Desrosiers McArthur; Konwana'Ke:ren Diabo; Alexia Gagnon; Maïka Nadeau | 45.693 | Nova Scotia; Ava Carew; Jacy Grant; Julia Lilley Osende; Jessica Mackay | 46.129 | Ontario; Evie Marie Eileen McDonald; Janina Winnicki; Amelia Wojtyk; Zoe Wojtyk | 46.759 |
| Women's IC-4 500m | Nova Scotia; Sloan MacKenzie; Jacy Grant; Julia Lilley Osende; Jessica Mackay | 1:52.487 | Quebec; Elizabeth Desrosiers McArthur; Konwana'Ke:ren Diabo; Alexia Gagnon; Maïka Nadeau | 1:54.024 | Ontario; Evie Marie Eileen McDonald; Janina Winnicki; Amelia Wojtyk; Zoe Wojtyk | 1:55.701 |
| Mixed C-2 500m | Nova Scotia; Andrew Billard; Sloan MacKenzie | 2:02.269 | Quebec; Konwana'Ke:ren Diabo; Viktor Hardy | 2:03.655 | Ontario; Ydris Hunter; Zoe Wojtyk | 2:07.267 |

=== Kayak ===
| Event | Gold | | Silver | | Bronze | |
|---|---|---|---|---|---|---|
| Men's K-1 200m | Alexandre Martin; Quebec | 37.804 | Ian Gaudet; Nova Scotia | 38.617 | Lucas Stein; Ontario | 39.746 |
| Men's K-1 500m | Alex Canning; Nova Scotia | 1:42.70 | Justin Lavigne; Quebec | 1:43.95 | Cameron Low; Ontario | 1:48.05 |
| Men's K-1 1000m | Craig Johnson; Nova Scotia | 3:37.315 | Jason Burkholder; Ontario | 3:38.253 | Mathieu Gilbert; Quebec | 3:42.567 |
| Men's K-1 5000m | Cole Parsons; Nova Scotia | 23:10.9 | Aidan Domont; Ontario | 23:17.9 | Sacha Skirzyk; Manitoba | 23:40.6 |
| Men's K-2 200m | Nova Scotia; Alex Eisener-Mallett; Craig Johnson | 36.242 | Quebec; Jérôme Desrosiers-McArthur; Nathan Koné | 36.808 | Ontario; Jason Burkholder; Aidan Dumont | 37.824 |
| Men's K-2 500m | Nova Scotia; Alex Canning; Ian Gaudet | 1:39.503 | Quebec; Jérôme Desrosiers-McArthur; Nathan Koné | 1:40.624 | Ontario; Jason Burkholder; Aidan Dumont | 1:40.954 |
| Men's K-2 1000m | Nova Scotia; Ian Gaudet; Cole Parsons | 3:24.90 | Quebec; Mathieu Gilbert; Nathan Koné | 3:25.23 | Ontario; Cameron Low; Lucas Stein | 3:29.38 |
| Men's K-4 200m | Quebec; Jérôme Desrosiers-McArthur; Nathan Koné; Justin Lavigne; Alexandre Martin | 33.379 | Nova Scotia; Alex Canning; Alex Eisener-Mallett; Ian Gaudet; Craig Johnson | 34.182 | Manitoba; Luke Enns; Owen Gaunt; Simon Hunt; Sacha Skirzyk | 35.935 |
| Men's K-4 500m | Quebec; Jérôme Desrosiers-McArthur; Mathieu Gilbert; Nathan Koné; Justin Lavigne | 1:24.667 | Nova Scotia; Alex Canning; Ian Gaudet; Craig Johnson; Cole Parsons | 1:24.779 | Manitoba; Luke Enns; Owen Gaunt; Simon Hunt; Sacha Skirzyk | 1:29.005 |
| Women's K-1 200m | Sarah Nagy; Ontario | 41.889 | Alina Tverie; Quebec | 42.408 | Kristiane Free; Alberta | 42.582 |
| Women's K-1 500m | Maren Bradley; Ontario | 1:56.26 | Alina Tverie; Quebec | 1:58.02 | Lily Baert; Nova Scotia | 1:58.88 |
| Women's K-1 1000m | Maren Bradley; Ontario | 4:03.825 | Cassidy MacPherson; British Columbia | 4:10.128 | Allie Wang; Quebec | 4:15.328 |
| Women's K-1 5000m | Lily Baert; Nova Scotia | 25:15.1 | Cassidy McPherson; British Columbia | 25:17.0 | Eva Looper; Ontario | 25:57.0 |
| Women's K-2 200m | Ontario; Sarah Nagy; Brooklyn Wodehouse | 41.703 | Quebec; Charlotte Brais; Allie Wang | 42.936 | Alberta; Julia Demchuk; Kristiane Free | 44.418 |
| Women's K-2 500m | Ontario; Maren Bradley; Sarah Nagy | 1:44.661 | Nova Scotia; Lily Baert; Annah Mbongo | 1:46.751 | Quebec; Florence Hamel; Alina Tverie | 1:46.824 |
| Women's K-2 1000m | Ontario; Eva Looper; Katy Stewart | 3:52.26 | Quebec; Florence Hamel; Allie Wang | 3:55.35 | British Columbia; Abigail Donaldson; Cassidy MacPherson | 3:59.03 |
| Women's K-4 200m | Quebec; Charlotte Brais; Marie-Pier Hallé; Florence Hamel; Allie Wang | 40.412 | Ontario; Maren Bradley; Eva Looper; Katy Stewart; Brooklyn Wodehouse | 41.347 | Nova Scotia; Lily Baert; Annah Mbongo; Ivy Murphy; Anna O'Brien | 41.726 |
| Women's K-4 500m | Quebec; Charlotte Brais; Florence Hamel; Alina Tverie; Allie Wang | 1:45.827 | Ontario; Maren Bradley; Eva Looper; Katy Stewart; Brooklyn Wodehouse | 1:45.877 | Nova Scotia; Lily Baert; Annah Mbongo; Ivy Murphy; Anna O'Brien | 1:49.937 |
| Mixed K-2 500m | Ontario; Cameron Low; Sarah Nagy | 1:46.543 | Quebec; Marie-Pier Hallé; Justin Lavigne | 1:49.011 | Nova Scotia; Lily Baert; Cole Parsons | 1:50.896 |

== Cycling ==
=== Mountain biking ===
| Event | Gold | | Silver | | Bronze | |
|---|---|---|---|---|---|---|
| Men's Cross Country | Maxime St-Onge; Quebec | 1:04:15 | Charles-Antoine St-Onge; Quebec | 1:04:17 | Matthew Leliveld; Ontario | 1:05:28 |
| Women's Cross Country | Ava Holmgren; Ontario | 1:22:42 | Marin Lowe; British Columbia | 1:23:33 | Marie-Fay St-Onge; Quebec | 1:23:59 |
| Men's Sprint | Zorak Paillé; Quebec | 3:13.36 | Charles-Antoine St-Onge; Quebec | 3:13.37 | Noah Rubuliak; British Columbia | 3:14.03 |
| Women's Sprint | Julianne Sarrazin; Quebec | 3:37.12 | Ava Holmgren; Ontario | 3:40.38 | Jenaya Francis; Alberta | 3:41.67 |
| Men's relay | Quebec; Zorak Paillé; Charles-Antoine St-Onge; Maxime St-Onge | 35:47 | Ontario; Ian Ackert; Matthew Leliveld; Xander Woodford | 36:12 | Nova Scotia; Liam Faubert; Ryan MacDonald; Eric McLean | 37:42 |
| Women's relay | Ontario; Ava Holmgren; Isabella Holmgren; Jocelyn Stel | 41:07 | Quebec; Juliette Larose-Gingras; Julianne Sarrazin; Marie-Fay St-Onge | 42:39 | Alberta; Christiane Bilodeau; Jenaya Francis; Ella Myers | 44:42 |

=== Road ===
| Event | Gold | | Silver | | Bronze | |
|---|---|---|---|---|---|---|
| Men's Criterium | Charles Duquette; Quebec | 41 pts | Philippe Jacob; Quebec | 29 pts | Evan Russell; British Columbia | 11 pts |
| Men's Individual Time Trial | Tristan Jussaume; Quebec | 26:35.48 | Evan Russell; British Columbia | 27:24.86 | Philippe Jacob; Quebec | 27:39.04 |
| Men's Road Race | David Olejniczak; Ontario | 2:45.20 | Charles Duquette; Quebec | 2:45:20 | Braden Kersey; British Columbia | 2:45:20 |
| Women's Criterium | Lilly Ujfalusi; British Columbia | 26 pts | Camille Primeau; Quebec | 25 pts | Alex Volstad; Alberta | 17 pts |
| Women's Individual Time Trial | Lucy Sky Hempstead; Ontario | 18:49.57 | Mairen Lawson; Alberta | 18:53.73 | Camille Primeau; Quebec | 19:12.03 |
| Women's Road Race | Laury Milette; Quebec | 1:58:32 | Anabelle Thomas; Alberta | 1:58:32 | Isla Walker; British Columbia | 1:58:32 |

== Diving ==
| Event | Gold | | Silver | | Bronze | |
|---|---|---|---|---|---|---|
| Men's 1m Springboard | Loïc Tremblay; Quebec | 282.10 | Chris Booler; Quebec | 252.85 | Adam Cohen; Manitoba | 249.05 |
| Men's 3m Springboard | Emmitt Reesor; Ontario | 285.25 | Ciro Mejia; Ontario | 281.15 | Ernest Braitenbach; Alberta | 268.20 |
| Men's Artistic | Chris Booler; Quebec | 229.75 | Adam Cohen; Manitoba | 219.70 | Emmitt Reesor; Ontario | 215.10 |
| Men's Platform | Ciro Mejia; Ontario | 308.00 | Kash Tarasoff; Saskatchewan | 292.05 | Arnaud Goulet; Quebec | 287.00 |
| Women's 1m Springboard | Amélie-Laura Jasmin; Quebec | 267.85 | Julianne Boisvert; Quebec | 237.80 | Keira Lu; British Columbia | 231.95 |
| Women's 3m Springboard | Michelle McLeod; British Columbia | 279.95 | Sonya Palkhivala; Quebec | 276.50 | Jordane Legault; Quebec | 265.95 |
| Women's Artistic | Sonya Palkhivala; Quebec | 221.10 | Julianne Boisvert; Quebec | 205.40 | Amélie-Laura Jasmin; Quebec | 195.20 |
| Women's Platform | Julianne Boisvert; Quebec | 300.80 | Michelle McLeod; British Columbia | 277.65 | Kayden Hayes; British Columbia | 239.95 |
| Mixed Team | Ontario A Nigel Chamber; Ciro Mejia; Emmitt Reesor; Aislinn Zuechner | 488.80 | Quebec White; Olivier Gauthier; Arnaud Goulet; Amélie-Laura Jasmin; Jordane Legault | 454.90 | Manitoba A Leia Berman; Attila Bernatsky; Adam Cohen; Alex Tiaglei | 418.80 |

== Golf ==
| Event | Gold | | Silver | | Bronze | |
|---|---|---|---|---|---|---|
| Men's Individual | Cooper Humphreys; British Columbia | 277 | Guillaume Paquette; Quebec | 278 | Peter Blazevic; Ontario | 283 |
| Women's Individual | Tina Jiang; British Columbia | 274 | Lauren Kim; British Columbia | 277 | Carlee Meilleur; Ontario | 292 |
| Mixed Team | British Columbia; Cooper Humphreys; Tina Jiang; Lauren Kim; Ethan Posthumus | 543 | Quebec; Malik Dao; Anne-Léa Lavoie; Guillaume Paquette; Léonie Tavares | 571 | Ontario; Peter Blazevic; Matthew Walter Martel; Carlee Meilleur; Alexa Ouellet | 574 |

== Rowing ==
| Event | Gold | | Silver | | Bronze | |
|---|---|---|---|---|---|---|
| Men's Single Scull | Stephen Harris; Ontario | 6:50.96 | Giancarlo DiPompeo; British Columbia | 6:52.41 | Connor Dodds; Saskatchewan | 6:54.54 |
| Men's Pair | Alberta; Axel Ewashko; Andrew Hubbard | 6:35.68 | Nova Scotia; Emerson Crick; Adam Giles | 6:40.89 | British Columbia; Jesse Harold; Liam Hodgins | 6:48.34 |
| Men's Double Sculls | British Columbia; Gunnar Platt; Quinn Storey | 6:21.09 | Ontario; Owen Bartel; Lucas Maroney | 6:25.19 | Saskatchewan; Grayson Laycock; Johnny McLeord | 6:30.33 |
| Men's Lightweight Double Sculls | Ontario; Stephen Harris; Alessio Perco | 6:23.65 | Quebec; Samuel Olivier Maconco; Charles-Etienne Tabet | 6:26.64 | British Columbia; Giancarlo DiPompeo; Matthew Thompson | 6:28.92 |
| Men's Four | Ontario; Michael Ciepiela; Payton Gauthier; Aidan Hembruff; Niko Schramm | 5:58.11 | Alberta; Axel Ewashko; Pat Milner; Eric Pettapiece; Sam Ree | 6:00.95 | Nova Scotia; Noel Balsor; Emerson Crick; Adam Giles; Robert Emil Walsh | 6:03.86 |
| Men's Quadruple Sculls | Ontario; Owen Bartel; Stephen Harris; Lucas Maroney; Alessio Perco | 6:06.98 | British Columbia; Giancarlo DiPompeo; Gunnar Platt; Quinn Storey; Matthew Thompson | 6:08.46 | Alberta; Michael Claassen; Andrew Hubbard; Ben Ravenscroft; Griffen Salmon | 6:18.16 |
| Men's Eight with Coxswain | Ontario; Kai Bartel; Adrian Breen; Michael Ciepiela; Preston Darling; Payton Gauthier; Aidan Hembruff; Shane Keagan; Riley Pisek; Niko Schramm | 6:00.21 | British Columbia; Connor Attridge; Alex Gonin; Jesse Harold; Liam Hodgins; Michael Keane; Frank Luo; Nicholas Murray-Coplen; Ellington Peacock; Liam Simpson | 6:00.63 | Alberta; Bob Bryden; Mac Dressler; Axel Ewashko; Henry King; Pat Milner; Eric Pettapiece; Sam Ree; Paige Sze; Alexis Vela | 6:14.26 |
| Women's Single Scull | Hailey Mercuri; Ontario | 7:36.89 | Claire Ellison; Nova Scotia | 7:41.49 | Pepper Howe; Saskatchewan | 7:45.25 |
| Women's Double Sculls | Ontario; Anna Pamenter; Cait Whittard | 7:03.43 | Quebec; Maryann Côté-Mashala; Maylie Valiquette | 7:04.20 | Nova Scotia; Sophie Inkpen; Jana Peachey | 7:13.28 |
| Women's Lightweight Doubles Sculls | Ontario; Zoe Durcak; Julia Teixera | 7:43.02 | British Columbia; Ehren Paterson; Meaghan Camplin | 7:49.25 | Quebec; Camélie Houle; Isabel Izquierdo-Bernier | 8:07.24 |
| Women's Pair | Ontario; Stella Bittman; Maya Meschkuleit | 7:38.98 | British Columbia; Sally Juliette Jones; Ellie Sousa | 7:43.10 | Nova Scotia; Claire Ellison; Jana Peachey | 7:44.86 |
| Women's Four | British Columbia; Danica Ariano; Mira Calder; Sally Juliette Jones; Ellie Sousa | 6:35.25 | Ontario; Malarie Jones; Cailidh MacDonald; Hailey Mercuri; Maya Meschkuleit | 6:40.27 | Alberta; Kaliya Javra; Beth Miller; Gabriella Worobec; Gabby Yaerma | 6:50.52 |
| Women's Quadruple Sculls | Ontario; Fiona Elliott; Anna Pamenter; Madeson Daisy Scott; Cait Whittard | 7:03.86 | Saskatchewan; Pepper Howe; Megan Kish; Shelby Lane; Lauren Matai | 7:09.21 | British Columbia; Danica Ariano; Natalya Ariano; Teagan Blue; Elisa Luo | 7:11.01 |
| Women's Eight with Coxswain | Ontario; Stella Bittman; Zoe Durcak; Fiona Elliott; Georgia Greenwood; Malarie Jones; Ceilidh MacDonald; Hailey Mercuri; Maya Meschkuleit; Teagan Orth | 6:12.27 | British Columbia; Danica Ariano; Lyndsey Bryden; Mira Calder; Claire Hallett; Sally Juliette Jones; Caitlin Lawrence; Elisa Luo; Ellise Sousa; Willow Ming Ting Woon | 6:15.45 | Saskatchewan; Pepper Howe; Lily Jedlic; Mya Grace Kelln; Megan Kish; Shelby Lane; Elsa Lissel-DeCorby; Ellen Marion; Lauren Matai | 6:24.49 |

== Rugby Sevens ==
| Event | Gold | Silver | Bronze |
|---|---|---|---|
| Women's | British Columbia; Anya Prokopich; Lana Dueck; Katie Foss; Tia Jordo; Adia Pye; Sienna Stigant; Lucie Romeo; Grace Turner; Jesse Knaggs; Skye Farish | Quebec; Megan Allard; Camille Arvin-Bérod; Catherine-Ann Maui Blenkhorn; Jasmine Coulombe-Ferrari; Emily Fortin; Erica Osei; Sarah Scott; Lyanne St-Amour; Alisson St-Onge; Piper Walsh | Ontario; Madison Donnelly; Taylor Pate; Grace Jacklyn; Victoria Stanley; Halle Woodcock; Rachel Cullum; Emily Cooper; Robyn Baker; Jordan Smith; Sierra Wood |

== Sailing ==
| Event | Gold | | Silver | | Bronze | |
|---|---|---|---|---|---|---|
| Men's Double Handed 29er | British Columbia; Colin Gilley; Matt Young | 15 pts | Ontario; Ford Amery; Tom Desrochers | 18 pts | Nova Scotia; Silas Conlin-Morse; Alex Graham | 38 pts |
| Men's Single Handed Laser | James Fair; Alberta | 15 pts | Sullivan Nakatsu; Nova Scotia | 15 pts | Aethan Cubitt; Ontario | 16 pts |
| Women's Double Handed 29er | British Columbia; Jessica Hirschbold; Grace Poole | 16 pts | Nova Scotia; Kat Lowe; Hailey Jayne Nichols | 18 pts | Quebec; Julia Capolicchio; Bianca MacHabée | 36 pts |
| Women's Single Handed Laser Radial | Victoria Coady; British Columbia | 9 pts | Loa Dinel; Quebec | 18 pts | Annie Balasubramanian; Ontario | 20 pts |
| 2.4m Para Mix | Siobhan MacDonald; Ontario | 7 pts | Krystle Shewchuk; Saskatchewan | 17 pts | Paige Butz; Saskatchewan | 17pts |

== Soccer ==
| Event | Gold | Silver | Bronze |
|---|---|---|---|
| Men's | Quebec; Tudor Iordan; Alexandra Marcoux; Kunda Dominique; Edward Schryburt; Ishmael Jones; Rayane Tchemmoun; Nicolas Henry; Adam N'Goran; Benjamin Haynes; Nick Pietrantonio; Jude Michel; Tyrese Jordan; Nikola Markovic; Mandell François; Ross Appolon; Maleek Manswell; Simon Annabi; Samir Djeha | Ontario; Christian Lisi; Mason Luigi Petrucci; Lucas Ozimec; Mekhi Wright; Jordan Barclay; Isaiah Whittaker-Francis; Adrian Panaite; Shayan Soltanzadeh; Lazar Stefanovic; Thomas DiClemente; Andrew Romano; Ethan Kang; Lucas Olguin; Matteo Cristian Albia; Jason Hartill; Myles Morgan; Jovan Ivanisevic; Joseph Daher | Alberta; Michael Barrett; Ali Yildiz; Skyler Rogers; Emmanuel Kanu; David Sithole; Niko Myroniuk; Nekhi Wright; Yusupha Bangura; Joshua Njongwe; Josral Frederick; Michael Harms; William Omoreniye; Victor Gouttin; Kelsey Egwu; Nick Lechelt; Ali Blaybel; Joey Plenzik; Emmanuel Dan-Adokiene |
| Women's | Ontario; Sofia Cortes-Browne; Amanda Allen; Faith Fenwick; Rosa Maalouf; Nyah Rose; Ava Greco; Zoe Markesini; Patricia Tsokos; Renee Watson; Naiya McFarlance; Anaya Johnson; Jadea Collin; Allison Carabin; Maya Galko; Aliya Gomes; Kayla Briggs; Alanna Raimondo; Teegan Melenhorst | Quebec; Karolanne Lafortune; Nellie Sigman; Léa Larouche; Emilie Grondines; Maude Savaria; Léa Mallais; Laurence Leblanc; Marie-Luz Jetté-Arguelles; Victoria Dupont; Félicia Roy; Léonie Lebel; Christina Salama; Janet Okeke; Katerina Vassilounis; Audrey Robert; Mika Marolly; Rosalie Olou; Lisa Kazandjian | Nova Scotia; Ellie Lancaster; Grace Hannaford; Niamh Martin-Manuel; Makenna Bowser; Leah Mombourquette; Neila MacDonald; Madalyn Hatfield; Rylin Matheson; Jamie Provo; Mya Elizabeth Archibald; Sierra Gallant; Emma Crowe; Bryn Canning; Rachel Kibble; Sierra Sarty; Olivia Jack; Abbey Aucoin; Reegan Isabelle Wagg |

== Softball ==
| Event | Gold | Silver | Bronze |
|---|---|---|---|
| Men's | Ontario; Austin Eadie; Mitch McKay; Robbie Barker; Kurt McCann; Gavin Gibbons; Tucker Firth; Mason Mckay; Connor Brooks; Mac Mulvey; Thomas Baker; James Thiery Martell; Owen Torrie; Curtis Ruetz; Brendan Hagerman | Nova Scotia; Rowan Sears; Noah Berniquer; Alec MacDonald; Nick White; Evan Tilley; David Watson; Riley MacKinnon; Cam Patton; Nathan Peters; Keegan Crowell; Brody Fraser; Callum Bouma; Caleb Isenor; Tyler Payne; Brayden Woodworth | Saskatchewan; Max Major; Troy Devon Preymack; Ethan William Sommerfeldt; Koby Faubert; Jordan Perrin; Brayden Harris; Ryan Christopher Bicknell; Kobey Clarke; Quaid Chief; Will Major; Rayn Ray; Scot Yellowlees; Oakley Durham; Troy Kosmynka; Brant Wiebe |
| Women's | British Columbia; Kennedy Laird; Cassidy Affeldt; Morgan Reimer; Camryn Milley; Shae Sever; Abby McGlynn; Madelyn McKinnon; Kiwi Fournier; Nevada Johnson; Ellie Vance; Erin Murphy; Ella Herrewig; Gabrielle Papushka; Ry Binne; Kaitlyn Eng | Quebec; Annabelle Guay; Laurianne Lecavalier; Bonnie Zachary; Emily Meloche; Jessica Mallette; Léa Fréchette; Alexia Chevrier; Naomi Cohen; Olivia May Giguère; Léa Chevrier; Naomi Pelletier; Maxim Provost; Emma Duncan; Estelle Audette; Valerie Sigouin | Ontario; Sierra Baltzer; Laura Winters; Katina Duscio; Rayven Buchanan; Deanna Grahek; Amy Hughes; Sasha Buckberger; Katie Lorenz; Tierney Hocquard; Leah Fowler Marshall; Kait Achtermeier; Kaitlyn Kim; Cadence Dobranski; Michaela Tuck |

== Swimming ==
=== Male ===
| Event | Gold | | Silver | | Bronze | |
|---|---|---|---|---|---|---|
| 50m Backstroke | Wells Ginzer; Alberta | 27.06 | Alexandar Lackovic; Ontario | 27.25 | Tristan Govier; British Columbia | 27.45 |
| 50m Backstroke Special Olympics | Connor Bissett; Alberta | 32.79 | Ramon Siytangco; British Columbia | 36.32 | Lucas Landry; Quebec | 37.64 |
| 100m Backstroke | Thomas Caruso; British Columbia | 58.66 | Alexandar Lackovic; Ontario | 58.76 | Antoine Destang; Ontario | 1:00.38 |
| 100m Backstroke Special Olympics | Connor Bissett; Alberta | 1:11.36 | Ramon Siytangco; British Columbia | 1:16.54 | Thomas Patrick Pelley; Newfoundland and Labrador | 1:18.36 |
| 200m Backstroke | Thomas Caruso; British Columbia | 2:07.13 | Paul Orogo; British Columbia | 2:09.09 | Justin Fontaine; Quebec | 2:11.21 |
| 50m(S1-5) / 100m(S6-14) Backstroke Para | Cameron Chambers; British Columbia | 682 pts | Jesse Canney; New Brunswick | 664 pts | Reid Maxwell; Alberta | 559 pts |
| 50m Breaststroke | Keilen Bellis; Nova Scotia | 30.17 | Brodie Khajuria; Ontario | 30.22 | Sinan Onur; Quebec | 30.23 |
| 50m Breaststroke Special Olympics | Connor Bissett; Alberta | 36.09 | Ramon Siytangco; British Columbia | 36.34 | Wesley Wilks; Alberta | 38.10 |
| 100m Breaststroke | Keilen Bellis; Nova Scotia | 1:06.06 | Sinan Onur; Quebec | 1:06.09 | Jett Verjee; Alberta | 1:06.18 |
| 200m Breaststroke | Tanner Cole; Alberta | 2:21.32 | Nathan Thomas; Quebec | 2:22.93 | Justin Jung; British Columbia | 2:23.39 |
| 50m(SB1-3)/100m(SB4-9,11-14) Breaststroke Para | Charlie Giammichele; Ontario | 496 pts | Cameron Chambers; British Columbia | 465 pts | Jesse Canney; New Brunswick | 457 pts |
| 50m Butterfly | Chris Weeks; Newfoundland and Labrador | 24.53 | Antoine Destang; Ontario | 25.35 | Addison Butler; Alberta | 25.54 |
| 100m Butterfly | Nicholas Duncan; Alberta | 55.52 | Bill Dongfang; British Columbia | 55.70 | Max Malakhovets; Ontario | 55.95 |
| 200m Butterfly | Max Malakhovets; Ontario | 2:02.44 | Peter Huang; British Columbia | 2:03.00 | Bill Dongfang; British Columbia | 2:04.29 |
| 50m(S1-7) / 100m(S8-14) Butterfly Para | Hunter Helberg; Alberta | 649 pts | Reid Maxwell; Alberta | 571 pts | Jesse Canney; New Brunswick | 559 pts |
| 50m Freestyle | Laon Kim; British Columbia | 24.04 | Chris Weeks; Newfoundland and Labrador | 24.07 | Preston McMann; Ontario | 24.51 |
| 50m Freestyle Para | Reid Maxwell; Alberta | 650 pts | Nate Luscombe; Newfoundland and Labrador | 612 pts | Cameron Chambers; British Columbia | 605 pts |
| 50m Freestyle Special Olympics | Connor Bissett; Alberta | 26.81 | Thomas Patrick Pelley; Newfoundland and Labrador | 28.95 | Lucas Landry; Quebec | 29.52 |
| 100m Freestyle | Antoine Sauvé; Quebec | 52.58 | Chris Weeks; Newfoundland and Labrador | 52.76 | Laon Kim; British Columbia | 52.96 |
| 100m Freestyle Para | Reid Maxwell; Alberta | 656 pts | Cameron Chambers; British Columbia | 641 pts | Jesse Canney; New Brunswick | 622 pts |
| 100m Freestyle Special Olympics | Connor Bissett; Alberta | 58.89 | Thomas Patrick Pelley; Newfoundland and Labrador | 1:02.88 | Ramon Siytangco; British Columbia | 1:06.25 |
| 200m Freestyle | Peter Huang; British Columbia | 1:54.31 | Antoine Sauvé; Quebec | 1:54.38 | Olivier Risk; Ontario | 1:56.14 |
| 400m Freestyle | Aidan Erickson; British Columbia | 4:03.34 | Timothé Barbeau; Quebec | 4:03.48 | Eric Dupre; Manitoba | 4:03.66 |
| 800m Freestyle | Timothé Barbeau; Quebec | 8:21.29 | Aidan Erickson; British Columbia | 8:24.28 | Sebastian Gonzalez Barboza; Quebec | 8:24.42 |
| 1500m Freestyle | Timothé Barbeau; Quebec | 15:51.52 | Sebastian Gonzalez Barboza; Quebec | 15:59.91 | Eric Dupre; Manitoba | 16:03.48 |
| 4 × 100 m Freestyle Relay | British Columbia; Laon Kim; Peter Huang; Tristan Govier; Bill Dongfang | 3:30.80 | Quebec; Antoine Sauvé; Laurier Lafontaine-Giguère; Timothé Barbeau; Zachary Parisé | 3:31.96 | Ontario; Antoine Destang; Alexandar Lackovic; Preston McMann; Jordi Vilchez | 3:32.39 |
| 4 × 200 m Freestyle Relay | Ontario; Max Malakhovets; Antoine Destang; Olivier Risk; Jordi Vilchez | 7:40.91 | British Columbia; Peter Huang; Aidan Erickson; Laon Kim; Bill Dongfang | 7:45.81 | Alberta; Nicholas Duncan; Addison Butler; Cooper Waddle; Torren Vandersteen | 7:55.29 |
| 200m(S1-5,S14) / 400m(S6-13) Freestyle Para | Reid Maxwell; Alberta | 100 pts | Jesse Canney; New Brunswick | 71 pts | Nate Luscombe; Newfoundland and Labrador | 57 pts |
| 200m IM | Jordi Vilchez; Ontario | 2:08.90 | Addison Butler; Alberta | 2:11.94 | Nicholas Duncan; Alberta | 2:12.60 |
| 400m IM | Sebastien Gonzalez Barboza; Quebec | 4:31.56 | Jordi Vilchez; Ontario | 4:33.70 | Timothé Barbeau; Quebec | 4:34.25 |
| 150m (SM1-4) / 200m (SM5-14) IM Para | Jesse Canney; New Brunswick | 660 pts | Hunter Helberg; Alberta | 626 pts | Cameron Chambers; British Columbia | 609 pts |
| 4 × 100 m Medley | British Columbia; Paul Orogo; Kristofer Hulten; Bill Dongfang; Laon Kim | 3:52.23 | Alberta; Parker Deshayes; Jett Verjee; Nicholas Duncan; Addison Butler | 3:52.44 | Quebec; Justin Fontaine; Sinan Onur; Zachary Parisé; Antoine Sauvé | 3:54.86 |
| 3000m Open Water | Eric Dupre; Manitoba | 35.34 | Olivier Risk; Ontario | 35.35 | Dominik Kwiecien; Alberta | 35.37 |

=== Female ===
| Event | Gold | | Silver | | Bronze | |
|---|---|---|---|---|---|---|
| 50m Backstroke | Rebecca McGrath; Quebec | 29.91 | Dakota Howard; Alberta | 30.02 | Seinna Rodgers; Alberta | 30.03 |
| 50m Backstroke Special Olympics | Teagan Purvis; Manitoba | 43.40 | Bonnie-Jean Shade; British Columbia | 45.79 | Katie Xu; Ontario | 47.48 |
| 100m Backstroke | Delia Lloyd; Ontario | 1:04.47 | Natascha Borromeo; British Columbia | 1:04.62 | Sienna Rodgers; Alberta | 1:04.74 |
| 100m Backstroke Special Olympics | Teagan Purvis; Manitoba | 1:38.61 | Bonnie-Jean Shade; British Columbia | 1:43.24 | Katie Xu; Ontario | 1:45.92 |
| 200m Backstroke | Maya Bezanson; Ontario | 2:17.33 | Delia Lloyd; Ontario | 2:18.73 | Marissa Laurin; Alberta | 2:21.63 |
| 50m(S1-5) / 100m(S6-14) Para Backstroke | Katie Cosgriffe; Ontario | 830 pts | Breanna White; Alberta | 626 pts | Ruby Stevens; Ontario | 539 pts |
| 50m Breaststroke | Grace Lu; Ontario | 33.36 | Katie Graboski; Alberta | 33.41 | Halle West; Manitoba | 33.49 |
| 50m Breaststroke Special Olympics | Katie Xu; Ontario | 51.59 | Teagan Purvis; Manitoba | 54.21 | Hailey Borowski; British Columbia | 55.23 |
| 100m Breaststroke | Halle West; Manitoba | 1:11.76 | Grace Lu; Ontario | 1:13.65 | Laila Oravsky; Ontario | 1:14.10 |
| 200m Breaststroke | Julie Brousseau; Ontario | 2:34.82 | Halle West; Manitoba | 2:36.76 | Laila Oravsky; Ontario | 2:38.66 |
| 50m(SB1-3)/100m(SB4-9,11-14) Breaststroke Para | Tatiana Nault; Quebec | 574 pts | Katie Cosgriffe; Ontario | 550 pts | Ella Tucker; New Brunswick | 434 pts |
| 50m Butterfly | Leila Fack; British Columbia | 27.61 | Ashlyn Massey; Quebec | 27.87 | Jasmine Nicols; Ontario | 28.12 |
| 100m Butterfly | Maxine Clark; Alberta | 1:01.37 | Leila Fack; British Columbia | 1:01.38 | Ashlyn Massey; Quebec | 1:01.45 |
| 200m Butterfly | Mia West; Manitoba | 2:17.78 | Lily Zhang; British Columbia | 2:17.99 | Ashlyn Massey; Quebec | 2:18.44 |
| 50m(S1-7) / 100m(S8-14) Butterfly Para | Katie Cosgriffe; Ontario | 882 pts | Breanna White; Alberta | 495 pts | Hannah Ouellette; Saskatchewan | 488 pts |
| 50m Freestyle | Dakota Howard; Alberta | 26.28 | Leila Fack; British Columbia | 26.60 | Julie Brousseau; Ontario | 26.67 |
| 50m Freestyle Para | Katie Cosgriffe; Ontario | 800 pts | Alisson Gobeil; Quebec | 642 pts | Breanna White; Alberta | 629 pts |
| 50m Freestyle Special Olympics | Teagan Purvis; Manitoba | 35.98 | Naomi Leam; Alberta | 37.52 | Emma Girard; Quebec | 37.54 |
| 100m Freestyle | Maxine Clark; Alberta | 56.76 | Leila Fack; British Columbia | 56.85 | Julie Brousseau; Ontario | 56.88 |
| 100m Freestyle Para | Katie Cosgriffe; Ontario | 804 pts | Breanna White; Alberta | 594 pts | Alisson Gobeil; Quebec | 577 pts |
| 100m Freestyle Special Olympics | Teagen Purvis; Manitoba | 1:26.04 | Katie Xu; Ontario | 1:29.14 | Bonnie-Jean Shade; British Columbia | 1:29.46 |
| 200m Freestyle | Julie Brousseau; Ontario | 2:02.12 | Mia West; Manitoba | 2:03.53 | Bailey O'Regan; Ontario | 2:03.99 |
| 400m Freestyle | Bailey O'Regan; Ontario | 4:19.03 | Lydia Kilger; Quebec | 4:19.53 | Maya Bezanson; Ontario | 4:20.53 |
| 800m Freestyle | Bailey O'Regan; Ontario | 8:54.70 | Maya Bezanson; Ontario | 8:55.16 | Lydia Kilger; Quebec | 8:55.36 |
| 1500m Freestyle | Bailey O'Regan; Ontario | 17:08.38 | Lydia Kilger; Quebec | 17:10.24 | Julia Strojnowska; British Columbia | 17:17.74 |
| 4 × 100 m Freestyle Relay | Ontario; Julie Brousseau; Taya Hutchison; Maya Bezanson; Laila Oravsky | 3:50.04 | British Columbia; Julia Strojnowska; Sienna Angrove; Maria Saldana Riebeling; Leilani Fack | 3:51.73 | Alberta; Matea Gigovic; Dakota Howard; Maxime Clark; Milena Cosic | 3:53.54 |
| 4 × 200 m Freestyle Relay | Ontario; Julie Brousseau; Laila Oravsky; Maya Bezanson; Bailey O'Regan | 8:16.19 | British Columbia; Sienna Angrove; Leilani Fack; Julia Strojnowska; Maria Saldana Riebeling | 8:22.90 | Alberta; Dakota Howard; Milena Cosic; Maxime Clark; Abbi Bahler | 8:32.26 |
| 200m(S1-5,S14) / 400m(S6-13) Freestyle Para | Katie Cosgriffe; Ontario | 100 pts | Breanna White; Alberta | 71 pts | Alisson Gobeil; Quebec | 57 pts |
| 200m IM | Julie Brousseau; Ontario | 2:14.93 | Mia West; Manitoba | 2:17.98 | Maxine Clark; Alberta | 2:19.25 |
| 400m IM | Julie Brousseau; Ontario | 4:47.44 | Bailey O'Regan; Ontario | 4:56.80 | Sienna Angove; British Columbia | 4:58.64 |
| 150m (SM1-4) / 200m (SM5-14) IM Para | Katie Cosgriffe; Ontario | 783 pts | Tatiana Nault; Quebec | 459 pts | Alisson Gobeil; Quebec | 421 pts |
| 4 × 100 m Medley Relay | Alberta; Sienna Rodgers; Katie Graboski; Maxine Clark; Dakota Howard | 4:16.54 | Ontario; Delia Lloyd; Grace Lu; Jasmine Nicols; Julie Brousseau | 4:17.47 | British Columbia; Natascha Borromeo; Nathalie Day; Leilani Fack; Julia Strojnowska | 4:19.23 |
| 3000m Open Water | Bailey O'Regan; Ontario | 37.21 | Lydia Kilger; Quebec | 37.25 | Julia Strojnowksa; British Columbia | 37.43 |

=== Mixed ===
| Event | Gold | | Silver | | Bronze | |
|---|---|---|---|---|---|---|
| 4 × 100 m Freestyle Relay | Alberta; Addison Butler; Maxine Clark; Dakota Howard; Wells Ginzer | 3:38.47 | British Columbia; Sienna Angove; Bill Dongfang; Leila Fack; Laon Kim | 3:39.73 | Ontario; Julie Brousseau; Preston McCann; Laila Oravsky; Jordi Vilchez | 3:40.17 |
| 4 × 100 m Medley Relay | Alberta; Dakota Howard; Jett Verjee; Nicholas Nuncan; Maxine Clark | 4:02.09 | British Columbia; Paul Orogo; Justin Jung; Leilani Fack; Julia Strojnowska | 4:02.98 | Ontario; Alexandar Lackovic; Grace Lu; Max Malakhovets; Julie Brousseau | 4:04.85 |

== Tennis ==
| Event | Gold | Silver | Bronze |
|---|---|---|---|
| Mixed team | Quebec; Mélodie Collard; Ange Kevin Koua; Maxime St-Hilaire; Josie Usereau; Annabelle Xu; Kuang Qing Xu; Naomi Xu; JungHee You | British Columbia; Denny Bao; Leena Bennetto; Reece Carter; Alessia Cau; Connor Church; Emma Dong; Aram Noroozian; Henry Ren | Ontario; Ellie Daniels; Rachel Krzyzak; Aleksandar Mitric; Orly Ogilvy; Anna-Raphaëlle Serghi; Stefan Simeunovic; Nemanja Stefanovic; Ray Xie |

== Triathlon ==
| Event | Gold | | Silver | | Bronze | |
|---|---|---|---|---|---|---|
| Men's Sprint | Mathis Beaulieu; Quebec | 57:43 | Daniel Damian; British Columbia | 58:01 | Tristen Jones; Ontario | 58:39 |
| Men's Supersprint | Mathis Beaulieu; Quebec | 22:53 | Daniel Damian; British Columbia | 22:54 | Nicolas Harvey; Quebec | 23:14 |
| Women's Sprint | Collette Reimer; British Columbia | 1:06:16 | Anja Krueger; Manitoba | 1:05:32 | Sophia Howell; Alberta | 1:06:41 |
| Women's Supersprint | Collette Reimer; British Columbia | 25:54 | Sophia Howell; Alberta | 25:57 | Anja Krueger; Manitoba | 26:02 |
| Mixed relay | British Columbia; Sidney Clement; Daniel Damian; Trevor Laupland; Colette Reimer | 1:38:45 | Quebec; Béatrice Normand; Nicolas Harvey; Sarah Hamel; Mathis Beaulieu | 1:40:08 | Ontario; Alex Campbell; Mahaylia Datars; Tristen Jones; Sage Sulentic | 1:40:36 |

== Volleyball ==
| Event | Gold | Silver | Bronze |
|---|---|---|---|
| Men's | Saskatchewan; Noah Ospreth; Griffin Duncalfe; Isaiah Gregory Mamer; Skyler Varga; Spencer Purdie; Ethan Smith; Lucas Musschoot; Keegan Colleaux; Jacob Tratch; Travis Pruim; Brock Tomyn; Shaye Wall | Alberta; Zach van Geel; Max Penner; Aaron Elser; Ethan Czepuryk; Jacob Sargent; Jacob Breton; Marek Edwards; Logan Greves; Ashton South; Tate Howell; Mason Greves; Reeve Gingera | Ontario; Will McIntyre; Jasraj Nijjar; Cory Schoenherr; Matthew Rugosi; Daniil Hershtynovich; Dennis Cota; Brady Paterson; Owen Mellon; Fehin Awobodu; Kaden Schmidt; Nikola Mitrovic; Devin Cooney |
| Women's | Manitoba; Kendra Andjelic; Andi Almonte; Faye Murray; Lexi Herrod; Eve Catojo; Raya Surinx; Mya Morgan; Emma Goodman; Brooklyn Olfert; Natalie Leomoine-Sells; Nicole Hildebrand; Justine Kolody | Alberta; Isla Olesen; Evvia Belireau; Laila Johnston; Sheridan Coninx; Sammi Boag; Maryn Boldon; Sarah Zonneveld; Payton Shimoda; Robyn McLean; Daisy Olsen; Kylee Glanville; Faith Christensen | British Columbia; Olivia Andulajevic; Libby Meldrum; Tianna Kehler; Lucy Borowski; Olivia Tymkiw; Heather Benko; Liz Lee; Macyn Unger; Taylor de Boer; Madison Gardner; Nina Kovacevic; Grace Blaskovits |
| Men's Beach | Ontario; Steven Abrams; Jonny Pickett | British Columbia; Luke de Greeff; Dan Everton | Quebec; Grégoire Mercier-Noël; Hugo Ouellet |
| Women's Beach | Quebec; Audrey Gauthier; Laura Côté-Collin | Ontario; Sophia Hladyniuk; Emma Braticevic | British Columbia; Sara Ostojic; Julia Soeller |

== Wrestling ==
=== Male ===
| Event | Gold | Silver | Bronze |
|---|---|---|---|
| Men's 44 kg | Burhan Ahmad; Ontario | Not awarded | Not awarded |
| Men's 48 kg | Karan Patel; Ontario | Matt Drope; British Columbia | Cerio Abrenica; Manitoba |
| Men's 52 kg | Eekeeluak Avalak; Nunavut | Fred Calingay; Alberta | Zubin Gatta; Ontario |
| Men's 56 kg | Treye Trotman; Ontario | Ben Reid; Alberta | Ebraheim Aldrar; Manitoba |
| Men's 60 kg | Cruz Lewis; Ontario | Donovan Nuedorf; Saskatchewan | Jagvir Grewal; British Columbia |
| Men's 65 kg | Kai Harada; Ontario | Prabhjot Mander; British Columbia | RJ Hetherington; Prince Edward Island |
| Men's 70 kg | Nicholas Hooper; Alberta | Yann Heymug; Quebec | Mason Van Zantvoort; Ontario |
| Men's 76 kg | Connor Church; Quebec | Humraj Sandhar; British Columbia | Caius Harbridge; Ontario |
| Men's 85 kg | Aidan Stevenson; Alberta | Irman Kang; Ontario | Kai LeBlanc; New Brunswick |
| Men's 98 kg | Owen Giancola; Manitoba | Émile Forgues; Quebec | Owen Gudmundson; Alberta |
| Men's 120 kg | Karan Mahil; British Columbia | Omogbai Asekomhe; Ontario | Nick Cross; Quebec |
| Men's Team | Ontario; Burhan Ahmad; Omogbai Asekomhe; Zubin Gatta; Jathin Grewal; Kai Harada; Caius Harbridge; Irman Kang; Cruz Lewis; Karan Patel; Treye Trotman; Mason Van Zantvoort | British Columbia; Jaren Bhullar; Tejvir Dhinsa; Matt Drope; Jagvir Grewal; Karan Mahil; Prabhjot Mander; Arjun Mandher; Humraj Sandhar; Mark Schwichtenberg; Noah Tam | Alberta; Fred Calingay; Joseph De Maio; Owen Gudmundson; Nicholas Hooper; Zakir Ibrahimkheil; Peter McCrackin; Arjan Nagra; Khalin Radev; Ben Reid; Shahbaaz Singh; Aidan Stevenson |

=== Female ===
| Event | Gold | Silver | Bronze |
|---|---|---|---|
| Women's 44 kg | Laila Seed-Desai; Ontario | Alexandria Templeton Metke; Saskatchewan | Mia Bahi; British Columbia |
| Women's 48 kg | Annika Fines; Alberta | Maddie Charlton; Nova Scotia | Kara Marie Steeves; New Brunswick |
| Women's 52 kg | Serena Di Benedetto; Ontario | Maddie MacKenzie; Alberta | Julia Petryna; Saskatchewan |
| Women's 56 kg | Sophia Louise Bechard; Quebec | Olivia Lichti; Ontario | Mackenzie Cayer; Manitoba |
| Women's 60 kg | Gabriella Cross; British Columbia | Bronwyn MacGregor; Ontario | Anaka Chartrand; Manitoba |
| Women's 64 kg | Angelina Ellis-Toddington; Alberta | Myah Clatney; Saskatchewan | Marley Jackson; British Columbia |
| Women's 69 kg | Vanessa Keefe; Prince Edward Island | Natalie Vecchio; Ontario | Vivian Mei Kutnowski; New Brunswick |
| Women's 74 kg | Paige Maher; British Columbia | Shelby Guerin-Daniels; Saskatchewan | Lauren Smith; Ontario |
| Women's 79 kg | Rupinder Kaur Johal; British Columbia | Myah Phillips; Saskatchewan | Jasleen Mann; Alberta |
| Women's 84 kg | Claudia Landry; Ontario | Dimitra Russell; Alberta | Olivia Rose; Saskatchewan |
| Women's Team | British Columbia; Mia Bahi; Gina Bolognese; Gabriela Cross; Marley Jackson; Rupinder Kaur Johal; Paige Maher; Brooklyn Diya Prasad; Anmol Sahota; Ivy Threatful; Mikaela Trolland | Ontario; Serena Di Benedetto; Alyna Eastmond; Lilah Fraser; Sarah Guenther; Claudia Landry; Olivia Lichti; Francesca Lo Greco; Bronwyn MacGregor; Laila Seed-Desai; Lauren Smith; Nathalie Vecchio | Alberta; Natasha Ekundayo; Angelina Ellis-Toddington; Annika Fines; Maddie MacKenzie; Jasleen Mann; Lene-Marie McCrackin; Dimitra Russell; Payton Shields; Jusleen Sidhu; Brydon Switzer |

== External link ==
- Medal standings with list of medalists by Province/Territory
