= Swimming at the 2026 Mediterranean Games – Women's 800 metre freestyle =

Women's 800 metre freestyle at the 2026 Mediterranean Games
- Location: Taranto, Italy
- Dates: 24 August
- Competitors: 9 from 8 nations
- Winning time: 8:29.65

Medalists
gold medal	Noemi Cesarano	Italy
silver medal	Artemis Vasilaki	Greece
bronze medal	Francisca Martins	Portugal

The Women's 800 metre freestyle competition at the 2026 Mediterranean Games was held on 24 August 2026 at the Torre d'Ayala Swimming Stadium in Taranto. The final was contested in two heats, with the fastest heat and the slowest heat, and the overall ranking determined by the times recorded across both heats.

== Records ==
Prior to this competition, the existing world record was as follows:

World record	Katie Ledecky (USA)	8:04.12	Fort Lauderdale, United States	3 May 2025
Mediterranean Games record	Alessia Filippi (ITA)	8:20.78	Pescara, Italy	30 June 2009

== Results ==
=== Final ===
The final was held at 18:00.

Rank	Heat	Lane	Name	Nationality	Time	Notes
1st place, gold medalist(s)	1	6	Noemi Cesarano	Italy	8:29.65	
2nd place, silver medalist(s)	1	5	Artemis Vasilaki	Greece	8:30.02	
3rd place, bronze medalist(s)	1	4	Francisca Martins	Portugal	8:30.33	
4	1	3	Antonietta Cesarano	Italy	8:37.86	
5	1	7	Jamila Boulakbech	Tunisia	8:45.50	
6	1	2	Selinnur Sade	Turkey	8:53.00	
7	2	4	Špela Perše	Slovenia	9:18.04	
8	2	3	Margherita Gregoroni	San Marino	9:20.09	
	2	5	Sara Jankovikj	North Macedonia	Did not start	
