= Francisca Martins =

Portuguese swimmer (born 2003)

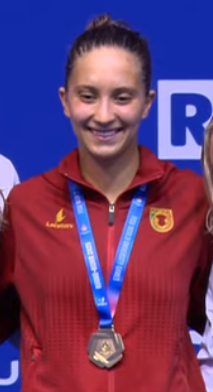

Personal information
- Full name: Francisca Soares Martins
- National team: Portugal
- Born: 27 June 2003 (age 23) Felgueiras, Portugal

Sport
- Sport: Swimming
- Strokes: Freestyle
- Club: Foca - Clube de Natação de Felgueiras
Medal record
Women's swimming
Representing Portugal
European Championships (LC)
Bronze medal – third place	2024 Belgrade	400 m freestyle
Mediterranean Games
Gold medal – first place	2026 Taranto	400 m freestyle
Bronze medal – third place	2026 Taranto	200 m freestyle
Bronze medal – third place	2026 Taranto	800 m freestyle
Bronze medal – third place	2026 Taranto	4×100 m mixed medley
World University Games
Gold medal – first place	2025 Rhine-Ruhr	400 m freestyle
Silver medal – second place	2025 Rhine-Ruhr	800 m freestyle
European U23 Championships
Silver medal – second place	2025 Samorin	400 m freestyle

Francisca Soares Martins (born 27 June 2003) is a Portuguese swimmer. She specialise in freestyle swimming.

== Personal life ==
Martins enrolled at the University of Minho where she studied Economy. In February 2026 she was distinguished as female athlete of the year at the XXIV Sports Gala of the university.

== Career ==
In 2024 Martins won bronze in the 400m freestyle at the European Championships in Belgrade.

The following year she took part in the U-23 European Championships in Šamorín, winning silver in the 400m freestyle. The following month she competed at the Universiade in Rhine-Rhur, winning silver in the 800m freestyle and gold in the 400m competition, also gaining a national record in the latter.

Competing at the 2026 European Championships in Paris she took 8th place in the 800m freestyle and 4th place in the 400m freestyle, improving her own national record. In August she competed at the 2026 Mediterranean Games in Taranto, winning gold in the 400 metre freestyle.
