= Swimming at the 2024 European Aquatics Championships – Women's 400 metre freestyle =

European swimming competition

Women's 400 metre freestyle at the 2024 European Aquatics Championships
- Venue: Sports Centre Milan Gale Muškatirović
- Dates: 23 June (heats and final)
- Competitors: 25 from 18 nations
- Winning time: 4:06.56

Medalists
gold medal	Ajna Késely	Hungary
silver medal	Barbora Seemanová	Czech Republic
bronze medal	Francisca Martins	Portugal

The Women's 400 metre freestyle competition of the 2024 European Aquatics Championships was held on 23 June 2024.

== Records ==
Prior to the competition, the existing world, European and championship records were as follows.

	Name	Nation	Time	Location	Date
World record	Ariarne Titmus	Australia	3:55.38	Fukuoka	23 July 2023
European record	Federica Pellegrini	Italy	3:59.15	Rome	26 July 2009
Championship record	Federica Pellegrini	Italy	4:01.53	Eindhoven	24 March 2008

== Results ==
=== Heats ===
The heats were started at 09:30.
Qualification Rules: The 8 fastest from the heats qualify to the final.

Rank	Heat	Lane	Name	Nationality	Time	Notes
1	2	5	Francisca Martins	Portugal	4:14.77	Q
2	2	4	Ajna Késely	Hungary	4:14.93	Q
3	2	6	Deniz Ertan	Turkey	4:15.50	Q
4	3	6	Maya Werner	Germany	4:15.74	Q
5	2	2	Fleur Lewis	Great Britain	4:16.49	Q
6	3	4	Barbora Seemanová	Czech Republic	4:16.55	Q
7	2	8	Iman Avdić	Bosnia and Herzegovina	4:17.12	Q
8	3	9	Vanna Djakovic	Switzerland	4:17.46	Q
9	3	2	Daria Golovaty	Israel	4:18.02	
10	3	3	Leonie Kullmann	Germany	4:18.53	
11	2	7	Wiktoria Guść	Poland	4:18.78	
12	3	1	Camille Henveaux	Belgium	4:18.93	
13	2	3	Merve Tuncel	Turkey	4:19.43	
14	3	7	Nóra Flück	Hungary	4:19.65	
15	3	8	Johanna Enkner	Austria	4:20.36	
16	2	1	Katja Fain	Slovenia	4:20.71	
17	2	0	Lena Opatril	Austria	4:21.23	
18	1	2	Giulia Viacava	Serbia	4:24.33	
19	3	0	Leonie-Sarah Tenzer	Finland	4:25.40	
20	1	1	Olivia Ana Šprláková-Zmorová	Slovakia	4:26.29	
21	1	8	Sara Jankovikj	North Macedonia	4:28.28	
22	1	6	Laura Benková	Slovakia	4:29.56	
23	1	7	Katarina Ćorović	Serbia	4:34.11	
24	1	0	Jana Milkovska	North Macedonia	4:35.78	
25	1	9	Vivian Xhemollari	Albania	4:41.53	
	1	3	Ada Hakkarainen	Finland	DNS	
	1	4	Louna Kasvio	Finland	DNS	
	1	5	Laura Lahtinen	Finland	DNS	
	2	9	Gizem Güvenç	Turkey	DNS	
	3	5	Boglárka Telegdy-Kapás	Hungary	DNS	

=== Final ===
The final was held at 19:14.

Rank	Lane	Name	Nationality	Time	Notes
1st place, gold medalist(s)	5	Ajna Késely	Hungary	4:06.56	
2nd place, silver medalist(s)	7	Barbora Seemanová	Czech Republic	4:06.72	
3rd place, bronze medalist(s)	4	Francisca Martins	Portugal	4:10.94	
4	2	Fleur Lewis	Great Britain	4:13.16	
5	6	Maya Werner	Germany	4:14.24	
6	8	Vanna Djakovic	Switzerland	4:15.32	
7	3	Deniz Ertan	Turkey	4:17.92	
8	1	Iman Avdić	Bosnia and Herzegovina	4:21.95	
