= Carla Carrón =

Spanish swimmer (born 2005)

Personal information
- Full name: Carla Carrón Muiña
- Nationality: Spanish
- Born: 2 July 2005 (age 21) Arzúa, Spain

Sport
- Sport: Swimming
- Strokes: Freestyle
- Club: Club Natació Sant Andreu

Carla Carrón Muiña (born 2 July 2005) is a Spanish swimmer specialising in middle- and long-distance freestyle events. She won a bronze medal in the 800 metre freestyle at the 2022 World Junior Swimming Championships in Lima.

== Career ==
=== Junior career ===
At the 2022 World Junior Swimming Championships in Lima, Peru, Carrón won the bronze medal in the 800 metre freestyle, one of six medals collected by the Spanish team in a campaign that placed Spain sixth in the medal table.

In July 2023, she finished seventh in the 800 metre freestyle at the 2023 European Junior Swimming Championships held in Belgrade.

=== Senior career ===
In June 2025, Carrón won the gold medal in the 800 metre freestyle at the Spanish Senior Open Trials, completing the event in 8:43.80.

In November 2025, at the Spanish Senior Open short-course championships held in Barcelona, Carrón became the first Spanish swimmer to secure qualification for the 2025 European Short Course Swimming Championships in Lublin after meeting the qualifying time in the 400 metre freestyle on the opening day of competition. She was subsequently confirmed as the eighth and final member of the Spanish women's team for the championship. The Royal Spanish Swimming Federation officially included her in the 25-member Spanish squad for the event.

In March 2026, as a member of the Club Natació Sant Andreu women's relay team alongside Ainhoa Campabadal, Julia Pujadas and Julia Muñoz, she set a Spanish club record in the women's 4×200 metre freestyle relay with a time of 8:03.16 at the Spanish Senior Open Championships in Sabadell.
