= Ruka Takezawa =

Japanese swimmer (born 2006)

Personal information
- Nationality: Japanese
- Born: 8 May 2006 (age 20)
- Education: Waseda University

Sport
- Sport: Swimming
- Strokes: Freestyle
- Club: Tokyo Swimming Center
Medal record
Women's swimming
Representing Japan
Asian Games
Silver medal – second place	2026 Aichi–Nagoya	4×200 m freestyle
World University Games
Bronze medal – third place	2025 Rhine-Ruhr	800 m freestyle
Bronze medal – third place	2025 Rhine-Ruhr	4×200 m freestyle
World Junior Championships
Silver medal – second place	2023 Netanya	1500 m freestyle

Ruka Takezawa (Japanese: 竹澤瑠珂; born 8 May 2006) is a Japanese competitive swimmer who specialises in freestyle, particularly middle- and long-distance events. She competes for Waseda University and the Tokyo Swimming Center. At the 2026 Asian Games, she won a silver medal in the women's 4 × 200 metre freestyle relay.

== Early life and career ==
Takezawa attended Musashino High School in Tokyo and trained at the Tokyo Swimming Center. She represented Japan at international junior competitions, establishing herself in freestyle events over 200 to 1500 metres.

At the 2022 World Aquatics Junior Swimming Championships in Lima, Peru, Takezawa finished fifth in the women's 200 metre freestyle and won silver medals in the 400, 800 and 1500 metre freestyle events. She also competed at the Junior Pan Pacific Championships in Hawaii that year.

Takezawa enrolled at Waseda University in its School of Sport Sciences and joined the university's swimming team. She continued competing in freestyle events while representing both the university and the Tokyo Swimming Center.

At the 2025 Summer World University Games in Germany, Takezawa competed in the women's 800 metre freestyle and the 4 × 200 metre freestyle relay for Japan. Her results at the competition added to her experience in senior international swimming.

In March 2026, Takezawa won the women's 100 and 200 metre freestyle events at the Japan Swimming Championships, which also served as a selection competition for the Asian Games and the Pan Pacific Championships. She also finished third in the 400 metre freestyle and second in the 800 metre freestyle.

Takezawa represented Japan at the 2026 Asian Games in Aichi and Nagoya. In the women's 4 × 200 metre freestyle relay, she swam as the third leg of the Japanese team, which finished second in 7:59.53 and won the silver medal. In the individual events, Takezawa finished sixth in the women's 200 metre freestyle with a time of 2:00.00 and fifth in the 800 metre freestyle in 8:41.62.
