= Antonietta Cesarano =

Italian swimmer (born 2003)

Personal information
- Nationality: Italian
- Born: 14 July 2003 (age 23)

Sport
- Sport: Swimming
- Strokes: Freestyle
Medal record
Women's swimming
Representing Italy
European Championships (LC)
Bronze medal – third place	2022 Rome	4×200 m mixed freestyle
Mediterranean Games
Silver medal – second place	2022 Oran	4×200 m freestyle
Bronze medal – third place	2022 Oran	400 m freestyle
Bronze medal – third place	2026 Taranto	400 m freestyle
World University Games
Silver medal – second place	2021 Chengdu	4×100 m freestyle
Bronze medal – third place	2021 Chengdu	400 m freestyle

Antonietta Cesarano (born 14 July 2003) is an Italian swimmer.

== Career ==
Cesarano competed at the 2022 Mediterranean Games and won a silver medal in the 4×200 metre freestyle relay with a time of 7:59.63. In August 2026, she competed at the 2026 Mediterranean Games and won a bronze medal in the 400 metre freestyle with a time of 4:13.17.

== Personal life ==
Her twin sister, Noemi Cesarano, is also a swimmer.
