= Noemi Cesarano =

Italian swimmer (born 2003)

Personal information
- Nationality: Italian
- Born: 14 July 2003 (age 23)

Sport
- Sport: Swimming
- Strokes: Freestyle
Medal record
Women's swimming
Representing Italy
European Championships (LC)
| Bronze medal – third place | 2022 Rome | 4×200 m mixed freestyle |
Mediterranean Games
| Gold medal – first place | 2026 Taranto | 800 m freestyle |
| Gold medal – first place | 2026 Taranto | 1500 m freestyle |
| Silver medal – second place | 2022 Oran | 4×200 m freestyle |
World University Games
| Bronze medal – third place | 2021 Chengdu | 800 m freestyle |
| Bronze medal – third place | 2021 Chengdu | 1500 m freestyle |

Noemi Cesarano (born 14 July 2003) is an Italian swimmer.

== Career ==
Cesarano competed at the 2022 Mediterranean Games and won a silver medal in the 4×200 metre freestyle relay with a time of 7:59.63. In August 2026, she competed at the 2026 Mediterranean Games and won a gold medal in the 1500 metre freestyle with a Mediterranean Games records time of 16:08.39. She then won a gold medal in the 800 metre freestyle with a time of 8:29.65.

== Personal life ==
Her twin sister, Antonietta Cesarano, is also a swimmer.
