= Julie Brousseau =

Canadian swimmer (born 2006)

Personal information
- Born: 9 January 2006 (age 20) Ottawa, Ontario, Canada

Sport
- Country: Canada
- Sport: Swimming
- Strokes: Freestyle, medleys
- Club: Nepean Kanata Barracudas
- Coach: Scott Faithfull
Medal record
Women's swimming
Representing Canada
Pan American Games
Gold medal – first place	2023 Santiago	400 m medley
Gold medal – first place	2023 Santiago	4×100 m freestyle

Julie Brousseau (born 9 January 2006) is a Canadian swimmer. She is the reigning Pan American Games champion in the 400 m individual medley and she won a gold medal as part of Canada's 4 × 100 m freestyle relay at the 2023 Pan American Games in Santiago. Brousseau had previously tied the record for most medals at a Canada Summer Games when she won 11 medals at the 2022 Canada Summer Games including six gold, one silver, and four bronze.
